= Australian cricket team in New Zealand in 1985–86 =

International cricket tour

The Australian cricket team toured New Zealand in the 1985–86 season to play a three-match Test series and four-match one day series against New Zealand after NZ had toured Australia earlier in the season.

New Zealand won the series 1–0 with two matches drawn. It was the first time they had beaten Australia at home in a test series, and meant they retained the Trans-Tasman Trophy.

The one day series was drawn 2-2.

== Australian squad ==
Australia had just lost to New Zealand 2–1 at home during the 1985–86 season and were lucky to draw 0–0 against India. The team was greatly weakened by defections to the South African rebel tours. However they had just finished the home summer on a high note, having defeated India and New Zealand in the 1985–86 triangular one-day series. Allan Border was confident the team would win the one day series and bring back the Trans-Tasman Trophy.

The original squad selected was selected by Laurie Sawle, Greg Chappell, Jim Higgs and Dick Guy. It consisted of:

- Batsmen – Allan Border (captain), David Boon, Geoff Marsh, Greg Ritchie
- Fastbowlers – Craig McDermott, Simon Davis, Bruce Reid, Dave Gilbert
- Spinners – Ray Bright (vice-captain)
- All rounders – Steve Waugh, Greg Matthews
- Wicketkeepers – Tim Zoehrer, Wayne B. Phillips (also played as specialist batsman)
- Manager – Bob Merriman
- Assistant manager – Bob Simpson
- Physiotherapist – Errol Alcott

On-tour selectors: Border, Bright, Marsh

Wayne B. Phillips had been Australia's first choice wicketkeeper for two years. However his form behind the stumps had fallen away and the Australian selectors picked him as a specialist batsman again, with specialist keeper Tim Zoehrer picked in the side as Australia's first-choice gloveman. During the tour, Zoehrer returned to Australia with an eye infection and Phillips became the keeper.

Geoff Lawson was unavailable to play due to a back injury. Leg-spinner Bob Holland was overlooked for selection despite taking more first class wickets that summer than any other bowler. The writers of Wisden later argued this was a major mistake. Bill O'Reilly was delighted with the selections of Steve Waugh ("one of the best selections in the whole era of Greg Chappell's career at the selection committee's wheel") and Bruce Reid ("strong claims to be recognised as the finest left-arm speedster we put on the international arena since Alan Davidson"), but was disappointed in the selection of Ray Bright over Holland, and Greg Ritchie over Mark O'Neill:

This team is disappointing. There are not nearly enough rosy-cheeked new faces to beguile the eyes that have grown dim with the succession of recent disappointments. Australian cricket supporters not yet blinded and deafened by the one-day razzamatazz cannot be blamed for thinking that the four selectors have let this country down in a time of crisis.

Bob Simpson accompanied the side as an assistant manager/coach. He had been asked by Fred Bennett, the head of the Australian Cricket Board, if he was interested in taking on the job full-time. Steve Waugh later wrote that:

I'm not sure who got the bigger shock during the first couple of training sessions on that tour: Simmo, due to the team's low intensity work ethic, or the players, who had never been exposed to his level of passion at practice.

== Matches ==
- Auckland v Australia at Eden Park, Auckland, 15 February 1986 – Australia won this 50 over game easily by 6 wickets, due to three wickets from David Gilbert, a 93-run opening stand from Boon and Marsh, and Greg Richie's 66 off 58 balls.
- Northern Districts v Australian at Seddon Park, Hamilton, 16-18 February 1986 – Australia won this first class game by 4 wickets. Ray Bright took 5-42 and Reid 4–24 in the second innings. Australia's batting was a little brittle in the second innings but Border propped it up with a score of 77.

=== First Test ===
21–25 February 1986
(5-day match)
Scorecard

Australia	v	New Zealand
435 (146.1 overs); GRJ Matthews 130 (235); JV Coney 3/47 (18 overs)		379/6 (126.3 overs); JV Coney 101* (192); BA Reid 3/104 (31 overs)

Match drawn
Basin Reserve, Wellington
Umpires: FR Goodall and SJ Woodward

- New Zealand won the toss and elected to field.
- There was no play on the final day.
- SP Davis and TJ Zoehrer (both AUS), and SR Gillespie (NZ) made their Test debuts.

Australia made their highest test match score of the summer. Border was booed by the crowd when he came out to bat.

=== Second Test ===
28 February–4 March 1986
(5-day match)
Scorecard

Australia	v	New Zealand
364 (152.4 overs); AR Border 140 (338); RJ Hadlee 7/116 (44.4 overs)		339 (107.3 overs); MD Crowe 137 (226); SR Waugh 4/56 (23 overs)
219/7d (94 overs); AR Border 114* (201); JG Bracewell 4/77 (33 overs)		16/1 (14 overs); BA Edgar 9 (36); GRJ Matthews 1/0 (3 overs)

Match drawn
Lancaster Park, Christchurch
Umpires: BL Aldridge and FR Goodall
Player of the match: AR Border (AUS)

- New Zealand won the toss and elected to field.

Allan Border scores a century in each innings, helping Australia recover from a collapse each time. Steve Waugh scores his first test half century. Martin Crowe was knocked out by a Bruce Reid bouncer and was taken to hospital for x-rays but returned to score a century.

- Nelson v Australian at Trafalgar Park, Nelson, 6 March 1986 – a one-day game which Australia won by 82 runs. Ray Bright captained Australia, Greg Matthews scored a half century, and Wayne Philips was wicketkeeper but also bowled in Nelson's innings and took a wicket, ending with figures of 1–5. Greg Ritchie also bowled an over and returned identical figures.
- Central Districts v Australia, Pukekura Park, New Plymouth, 8-10 March 1986 – match drawn. Boon and Marsh both score centuries. Zoehrer makes 71 but Phillips only hits a high of 48.

=== Third Test ===
13–17 March 1986
(5-day match)
Scorecard

Australia	v	New Zealand
314 (135.3 overs); GR Marsh 118 (287); JG Bracewell 4/74 (43.3 overs)		258 (97 overs); JV Coney 93 (129); GRJ Matthews 4/61 (34 overs)
103 (60 overs); DC Boon 58* (174); JG Bracewell 6/32 (22 overs)		160/2 (84.4 overs); JG Wright 59 (210); BA Reid 1/30 (12.4 overs)

New Zealand won by 8 wickets
Eden Park, Auckland
Umpires: RL McHarg and SJ Woodward
Player of the match: JG Bracewell (NZ)

- Australia won the toss and elected to bat.
- GK Robertson (NZ) made his Test debut.

A bad tempered match with allegations of cheating on both sides. Australia led by 56 runs in the first innings but collapsed badly in the second to be all out for 103. John Bracewell gets 10-106. Australia's bowlers only took two wickets in New Zealand's second innings as they reached 160. Steve Waugh later described this game as a "terrible recurring nightmare". Allan Border wrote that:

It hurt. It hurt because we'd gone to New Zealand full of hope. We were a promising and emerging young side, we'd worked damned hard and we'd played good cricket most of the time. But we'd lost. We'd lost again. Every setback was making it harder to maintain optimism about the future.

This caused Border to have doubts about whether he wanted to continue as Australian captain.

== One Day Internationals ==
The Rothmans Cup was drawn 2-2.

=== 1st ODI ===
19 March 1986
Scorecard
Wisden report

New Zealand; 186/6 (50 overs)	v	Australia; 156 (47 overs)
MD Crowe 47 (77); DR Gilbert 2/35 (10 overs)		GR Marsh 35 (96); RJ Hadlee 4/15 (9 overs)

New Zealand won by 30 runs
Carisbrook, Dunedin
Umpires: BL Aldridge and GC Morris
Player of the match: RJ Hadlee (NZ) and MD Crowe (NZ)

- Australia won the toss and elected to field.
- TE Blain (NZ) made his ODI debut.

At a press conference in Christchurch before the second game, Allan Border threatened to resign if his team did not improve:

I've given up speaking to them. I've said basically everything that possibly can be said to this bunch. I'm basically leaving it up to them now. They are going to show me if they really want to play for Australia and whether they really want to play under me. I'll find out over the next three games and my decision will be made as to my future as a captain and a player after that... I don't think it's my captaincy... but if we continue to lose, you've just got to start saying: "Right, someone else has to come in and see if they can do something different." It just gets as simple as that. That's the way I see it. The fellows are not responding to me and that's that. I'll find out over the next three games if that's the case or not.

Vice-captain Ray Bright had a ninety-minute meeting with the rest of the players. He reported back that the players agreed they had been letting Border down and wanted him to continue as captain. New Zealand won the second game, but Australia showed improved effort and commitment. Australia managed to narrowly win the third match, and won the fourth comfortably.

=== 2nd ODI ===
22 March 1986
Scorecard
Wisden report

New Zealand; 258/7 (49 overs)	v	Australia; 205 (45.4 overs)
BA Edgar 74 (105); BA Reid 2/44 (10 overs)		DC Boon 47 (58); RJ Hadlee 2/36 (10 overs)

New Zealand won by 53 runs
Lancaster Park, Christchurch
Umpires: FR Goodall and RL McHarg
Player of the match: JV Coney (NZ)

- Australia won the toss and elected to field.
- The match was reduced to 49 overs per side.

=== 3rd ODI ===
26 March 1986
Scorecard

New Zealand; 229/9 (50 overs)	v	Australia; 232/7 (49.3 overs)
KR Rutherford 79 (105); SP Davis 2/37 (10 overs)		SR Waugh 71 (94); MD Crowe 2/44 (8 overs)

Australia won by 3 wickets
Basin Reserve, Wellington
Umpires: BL Aldridge and GC Morris
Player of the match: WB Phillips (AUS) and SR Waugh (AUS)

- New Zealand won the toss and elected to bat.

Australia won by 3 wickets with 3 balls remaining, due mostly to a sixth-wicket partnership stand of 86 between Steve Waugh and Wayne Phillips. Ray Bright was so overjoyed with the victory he smashed the stumps with his bat.

=== 4th ODI ===
29 March 1986
Scorecard
Wisden report

Australia; 231 (44.5 overs)	v	New Zealand; 187/9 (45 overs)
GRJ Matthews 54 (50); RJ Hadlee 2/35 (8.5 overs)		RJ Hadlee 40 (43); GRJ Matthews 3/33 (9 overs)

Australia won by 44 runs
Eden Park, Auckland
Umpires: RL McHarg and SJ Woodward
Player of the match: GRJ Matthews (AUS)

- Australia won the toss and elected to bat.
- The match was reduced before play started to 45 overs per side.

== Summary ==
The brightest spots of the tour for Australia were the batting form of Allan Border, the consolidation of David Boon and Geoff Marsh as an opening batting combination, and the emergence of Steve Waugh and Greg Matthews as all rounders. However the bowling was poor and the Australian batting was prone to collapse.

Greg Matthews was a constant target for the hostility of New Zealand crowds. During one game in Wellington a toilet was thrown on the field.

Towards the end of the tour, Bob Simpson said the positives to come out of it for Australia were the opening partnership of Boon and Marsh, the batting of Border and Ritchie, the promise of Waugh and Matthews, and the bowling of Reid, McDermott, Davis and Gilbert, although he felt McDermott was an enigma. He also said the team were fortunate to have Ray Bright as vice captain since his "attitude and application have been an inspiration to the whole touring party."

This tour marked the last time Wayne B. Phillips played for Australia – he was the only player who went to New Zealand who was not picked on the subsequent tour of India.

Steve Waugh later wrote that "in many ways, the [tour]... marked the beginning of a new era." Bob Simpson was appointed Australia's coach full-time, ushering in a greater degree of professionalism that helped Australia ultimately become the number one team in the world. Several players on this tour, such as Border, Marsh, Boon, McDermott and Waugh, were part of that journey.
