= Pakistani cricket team in New Zealand in 1984–85 =

International cricket tour

The Pakistan national cricket team toured New Zealand in January and February 1985 and played a three-match Test series and four One Day International (ODI) matches against the New Zealand national cricket team. New Zealand won the series 2–0 and New Zealand won the ODI series 3–0. New Zealand were captained by Geoff Howarth and Pakistan by Javed Miandad. This was New Zealand's last Test series win against Pakistan until November 2016.

== Test series summary ==
=== First Test ===
18 – 22 January 1985
(5–day match)
Scorecard

New Zealand	v	Pakistan
492 (175 overs); JF Reid 148 (427); Azeem Hafeez 5/127 (48 overs)		322 (129.4 overs); Saleem Malik 66 (114); SL Boock 5/117 (45 overs)
103/4 (45 overs); MD Crowe 33 (74); Iqbal Qasim 2/19 (16 overs)

Match drawn
Basin Reserve, Wellington
Umpires: GC Morris and SJ Woodward

- New Zealand won the toss and elected to bat.
- There was no play on the final day.

=== Second Test ===
25 – 28 January 1985
(5–day match)
Scorecard

Pakistan	v	New Zealand
169 (66.5 overs); Saleem Malik 41* (64); RJ Hadlee 4/60 (19.5 overs)		451/9d (147 overs); JF Reid 154* (318); Azeem Hafeez 3/157 (47 overs)
183 (59.4 overs); Mudassar Nazar 89 (187); BL Cairns 4/49 (19.4 overs)

New Zealand won by an innings and 99 runs
Eden Park, Auckland
Umpires: FR Goodall and SJ Woodward

- New Zealand won the toss and elected to field.
- The match was scheduled for five days but completed in four.
- Wasim Akram (PAK) made his Test debut.

=== Third Test ===
9 – 14 February 1985
(5–day match)
Scorecard

Pakistan	v	New Zealand
274 (94.2 overs); Qasim Umar 96 (215); RJ Hadlee 6/51 (24 overs)		220 (85.4 overs); MD Crowe 57 (171); Wasim Akram 5/56 (26 overs)
223 (88.4 overs); Qasim Umar 89 (211); EJ Chatfield 3/65 (26 overs)		278/8 (99.4 overs); JV Coney 111* (243); Wasim Akram 5/72 (33 overs)

New Zealand won by 2 wickets
Carisbrook, Dunedin
Umpires: FR Goodall and GC Morris
Player of the match: Wasim Akram (PAK)

- New Zealand won the toss and elected to field.
- 12 February was taken as a rest day.

== One Day Internationals (ODIs) ==
New Zealand won the Rothmans Cup 3-0, with 1 no result.

=== 1st ODI ===
12 January 1985
Scorecard

New Zealand; 277/6 (50 overs)	v	Pakistan; 167/9 (50 overs)
GP Howarth 68 (94); Tahir Naqqash 2/60 (10 overs)		Javed Miandad 38 (69); EA Chatfield 2/20 (10 overs)

New Zealand won by 110 runs
McLean Park, Napier
Umpires: DA Kinsella and SJ Woodward
Player of the match: RJ Hadlee (NZ)

- New Zealand won the toss and elected to bat.

=== 2nd ODI ===
15 January 1985
Scorecard

Pakistan; 221/4 (50 overs)	v	New Zealand; 222/6 (48.5 overs)
Javed Miandad 90* (92); JV Coney 2/16 (10 overs)		MD Crowe 59 (72); Wasim Raja 2/29 (10 overs)

New Zealand won by 4 wickets
Seddon Park, Hamilton
Umpires: DA Kinsella and TA McCall
Player of the match: Javed Miandad (PAK)

- Pakistan won the toss and elected to bat.

=== 3rd ODI ===
6 February 1985
Scorecard

New Zealand; 264/8 (50 overs)	v	Pakistan; 251 (49.4 overs)
JF Reid 88 (101); Tahir Naqqash 3/40 (8 overs)		Rameez Raja 75 (76); RJ Hadlee 3/32 (9.4 overs)

New Zealand won by 13 runs
Lancaster Park, Christchurch
Umpires: FR Goodall and GC Morris
Player of the match: JF Reid (NZ)

- New Zealand won the toss and elected to bat.
- Rameez Raja (PAK) made his ODI debut.

=== 4th ODI ===
16, 17 February 1985
Scorecard

Pakistan; 189 (49.1 overs)	v	New Zealand
Tahir Naqqash 61 (49); EJ Chatfield 3/20 (10 overs)

No result
Eden Park, Auckland
Umpires: TA McCall and SJ Woodward

- Pakistan won the toss and elected to bat.
- There was no play on the scheduled day.
