= Indian cricket team in New Zealand in 1980–81 =

International cricket tour

	New Zealand	India
- Dates: 14 February – 18 March 1981
Captains	Geoff Howarth	Sunil Gavaskar

Test series
- Result: New Zealand won the 3-match series 1–0
Most runs	John Reid (250)	Sandeep Patil (186)
Most wickets	Lance Cairns (13)	Ravi Shastri (15)
- Player of the series: John Reid (NZ)

One Day International series
- Results: New Zealand won the 2-match series 2–0
Most runs	Bruce Edgar (100)	Kapil Dev (51)
Most wickets	Gary Troup (4)	Karsan Ghavri (5)

The India cricket team toured New Zealand in the 1980–81 season to play a three-match Test series and a two-match One Day International (ODI) series against New Zealand. The tour also included two tour matches against New Zealand's first-class sides. After the tour ended, India played Fiji in a two-day game in Lautoka, defeating them by 220 runs. New Zealand won the ODI series 2–0 and the Test series that followed 1–0. It was their first series win against India in Tests in seven attempts.

India arrived in New Zealand on the back of a series-levelling win in the final Test against Australia. However, failing to capitalize on the momentum, India lost both ODIs played on consecutive days, before drawing a game against a first-class side. India missed the services of Shivlal Yadav for the entire Test series that followed, and of Dilip Doshi for the first Test after they sustained injuries on the Australia tour. New Zealand defeated India by 62 runs in the first Test, their first win against India in seven Tests, while India managed to secure draws in the next two. Wisden reasoned India's "inept batting" for their loss of the series.

== Tour matches ==
=== Three-day: Central Districts v Indians ===
17–19 February 1981
Scorecard

Indians	v	Central Districts
312/7d (90 overs); Kirti Azad 127*; David O'Sullivan 3/89 (28 overs)		277/7d (78 overs); Jock Edwards 103; Kirti Azad 3/70 (27 overs)
195/3d (64 overs); T. E. Srinivasan 90; Murray Jamieson 1/47 (16 overs)		29/0 (12 overs); Andrew Jones 11*; Yograj Singh 0/8 (6 overs)

Match drawn
McLean Park, Napier
Umpires: David Kinsella and Steve Woodward

- Central Districts won the toss and elected to field.
- T. E. Srinivasan (Indians) passed 3,000 runs in first-class cricket.

=== Three-day: Otago v Indians ===
28 February–2 March 1981
Scorecard

Otago	v	Indians
187 (78 overs); Bruce Blair 65; Kirti Azad 6/50 (26 overs)		318 (99.2 overs); Yashpal Sharma 89; John Bracewell 7/155 (40.2 overs)
117 (64 overs); Geoffrey Blakely 33; Ravi Shastri 5/21 (22 overs)

Indians won by an innings and 14 runs
Carisbrook, Dunedin
Umpires: George Morris and Neil Tapper

- Otago won the toss and elected to bat.

== ODI series ==
=== 1st ODI ===
14 February 1981
Scorecard

New Zealand; 218/6 (45 overs)	v	India; 140/9 (45 overs)
Bruce Edgar 99* (136); Karsan Ghavri 3/40 (10 overs)		Kapil Dev 50 (68); Lance Cairns 2/33 (7 overs)

New Zealand won by 78 runs
Eden Park, Auckland
Umpires: Bruce Bricknell (NZ) and Fred Goodall (NZ)
Player of the match: Bruce Edgar (NZ)

- India won the toss and elected to bat.

=== 2nd ODI ===
15 February 1981
Scorecard

New Zealand; 210/8 (50 overs)	v	India; 153 (45.2 overs)
Jeremy Coney 46 (63); Sandeep Patil 2/28 (10 overs)		Dilip Vengsarkar 41 (80); Gary Troup 3/18 (9.2 overs)

New Zealand won by 57 runs
Seddon Park, Hamilton
Umpires: John Hastie (NZ) and Robert Monteith (NZ)
Player of the match: Jeremy Coney

- India won the toss and elected to field.
- Gary Robertson (NZ) made his ODI debut.

This series was the first where players wore coloured clothing played with white balls and black sighscreens used outside Australia

== Test series ==
=== 1st Test ===
21–25 February 1981
Scorecard

New Zealand	v	India
375 (119 overs); Geoff Howarth 137; Ravi Shastri 3/54 (28 overs)		223 (72.4 overs); Sandeep Patil 64; Lance Cairns 5/33 (19.4 overs)
100 (49 overs); Bruce Edgar 28; Kapil Dev 4/34 (16 overs)		190 (75.3 overs); Sandeep Patil 42; Richard Hadlee 4/65 (22.3 overs)

New Zealand won by 62 runs
Basin Reserve, Wellington
Umpires: Fred Goodall (NZ) and Steve Woodward (NZ)
Player of the match: Geoff Howarth (NZ) and Sandeep Patil (Ind)

- India won the toss and decided to field.
- Kirti Azad, Ravi Shastri and Yograj Singh (Ind) and Martin Snedden (NZ) made their Test debuts.
- 24 February was a rest day.

=== 2nd Test ===
6–11 March 1981
Scorecard

India	v	New Zealand
255 (127 overs); Chetan Chauhan 78 (216); Richard Hadlee 5/47 (33 overs)		286/5 (145 overs); John Reid 123* (429); Ravi Shastri 2/65 (42 overs)

Match drawn
Lancaster Park, Christchurch
Umpires: John Hastie (NZ) and David Kinsella (NZ)
Player of the match: John Reid (NZ)

- India won the toss and decided to bat.

=== 3rd Test ===
13–18 March 1981
Scorecard

India	v	New Zealand
238 (130.3 overs); Syed Kirmani 78 (230); John Bracewell 4/61 (42.3 overs)		366 (186 overs); John Wright 110 (434); Ravi Shastri 5/125 (56 overs)
284 (120.5 overs); Sandeep Patil 57 (93); John Bracewell 5/75 (41 overs)		95/5 (62 overs); Jock Edwards 47 (96); Dilip Doshi 2/18 (19 overs)

Match drawn
Eden Park, Auckland
Umpires: Fred Goodall (NZ) and Steve Woodward (NZ)
Player of the match: John Wright (NZ) and Ravi Shastri (Ind)

- India won the toss and decided to bat.
- T. E. Srinivasan (Ind) made his Test debut.
- 16 March was a rest day.
