= English cricket team in New Zealand in 1983–84 =

International cricket tour

The England national cricket team toured New Zealand in January, February and March 1984 and played a three-match Test series and three-match ODI series against the New Zealand national cricket team. New Zealand won the Test series 1–0, with two matches drawn and lost the ODI series 2–1.

== Test series summary ==
=== First Test ===
20–24 January 1984
(5-day match)
Scorecard

New Zealand	v	England
219 (93.4 overs); JJ Crowe 52 (104); IT Botham 5/59 (27.4 overs)		463 (132.5 overs); DW Randall 164 (269); BL Cairns 7/143 (45 overs)
537 (187.3 overs); JV Coney 174* (374); NGB Cook 3/153 (66.3 overs)		69/0 (22 overs); CJ Tavaré 36* (36)

Match drawn
Basin Reserve, Wellington
Umpires: FR Goodall and SJ Woodward
Player of the match: IT Botham (ENG)

- New Zealand won the toss and elected to bat.

=== Second Test ===
3–5 February 1984
(5-day match)
Scorecard

New Zealand	v	England
307 (72.1 overs); RJ Hadlee 99 (81); RGD Willis 4/51 (22.1 overs)		82 (50.2 overs); MW Gatting 19* (82); EJ Chatfield 3/10 (8.2 overs)
		93 (f/o) (51 overs); DW Randall 25 (52); RJ Hadlee 5/28 (18 overs)

New Zealand won by an innings and 132 runs
Lancaster Park, Christchurch
Umpires: FR Goodall and SJ Woodward
Player of the match: RJ Hadlee (NZ)

- New Zealand won the toss and elected to bat.
- The match was scheduled for five days but completed in three.
- ACS Pigott (ENG) made his Test debut.

=== Third Test ===
10–15 February 1984
(5-day match)
Scorecard

New Zealand	v	England
496/9d (169.2 overs); JG Wright 130 (297); RGD Willis 3/109 (34 overs)		439 (227.3 overs); DW Randall 104 (338); SL Boock 3/103 (61.3 overs)
16/0 (5 overs); JG Wright 11* (25)

Match drawn
Eden Park, Auckland
Umpires: FR Goodall and SJ Woodward
Player of the match: IDS Smith (NZ)

- New Zealand won the toss and elected to bat.
- 13 February was taken as a rest day.

== One Day Internationals (ODIs) ==
England won the Rothmans Cup 2-1.

=== 1st ODI ===
18 February 1984
Scorecard

England; 188/9 (50 overs)	v	New Zealand; 134 (42.1 overs)
DW Randall 70 (85); RJ Hadlee 5/32 (10 overs)		BL Cairns 23 (26); RJ Hadlee 23 (31); IT Botham 2/7 (6 overs)

England won by 54 runs
Lancaster Park, Christchurch
Umpires: FR Goodall and IC Higginson
Player of the match: DW Randall (ENG)

- New Zealand won the toss and elected to field.
- NA Foster and CL Smith (both ENG) made their ODI debuts.

=== 2nd ODI ===
22 February 1984
Scorecard

New Zealand; 135 (47.1 overs)	v	England; 139/4 (45.1 overs)
JV Coney 44 (73); VJ Marks 5/20 (10 overs)		CL Smith 70 (118); EJ Chatfield 2/16 (10 overs)

England won by 6 wickets
Basin Reserve, Wellington
Umpires: GC Morris and SJ Woodward
Player of the match: VJ Marks (ENG)

- New Zealand won the toss and elected to bat.

=== 3rd ODI ===
25 February 1984
Scorecard

England; 209/9 (50 overs)	v	New Zealand; 210/3 (45.3 overs)
AJ Lamb 97* (140); EJ Chatfield 3/29 (10 overs)		MD Crowe 105* (105); IT Botham 1/22 (7 overs)

New Zealand won by 7 wickets
Eden Park, Auckland
Umpires: DA Kinsella and GC Morris
Player of the match: MD Crowe (NZ)

- England won the toss and elected to bat.
