= English cricket team in New Zealand in 1987–88 =

International cricket tour

The England national cricket team toured New Zealand in February and March 1988 and played a three-match Test series against the New Zealand national cricket team. The series was drawn 0–0.

== Test series summary ==
=== First Test ===
12–17 February 1988
(5-day match)
Scorecard

England	v	New Zealand
319 (120.1 overs); BC Broad 114 (244); DK Morrison 5/69 (21.1 overs)		168 (81.5 overs); RJ Hadlee 37 (135); GR Dilley 6/38 (24.5 overs)
152 (74.1 overs); MD Moxon 27 (94); EJ Chatfield 4/36 (30 overs)		130/4 (77 overs); AH Jones 54* (159); GR Dilley 2/32 (18 overs)

Match drawn
Lancaster Park, Christchurch
Umpires: BL Aldridge and SJ Woodward
Player of the match: EJ Chatfield (NZ)

- New Zealand won the toss and elected to field.
- 15 February was taken as a rest day.
- PW Jarvis (ENG) made his Test debut.

=== Second Test ===
25–29 February 1988
(5-day match)
Scorecard

New Zealand	v	England
301 (134.2 overs); JG Wright 103 (276); GR Dilley 5/60 (28 overs)		323 (141.1 overs); MD Moxon 99 (269); EJ Chatfield 4/37 (31.1 overs)
350/7d (169 overs); MJ Greatbatch 107* (325); GR Dilley 2/44 (23 overs)

Match drawn
Eden Park, Auckland
Umpires: FR Goodall and RL McHarg
Player of the match: JG Wright (NZ)

- England won the toss and elected to field.
- MJ Greatbatch (NZ) made his Test debut.

=== Third Test ===
3–7 March 1988
(5-day match)
Scorecard

New Zealand	v	England
512/6d (197 overs); MD Crowe 143 (333); DJ Capel 2/129 (39 overs)		183/2 (79 overs); MD Moxon 81* (232); EJ Chatfield 1/38 (23 overs)

Match drawn
Basin Reserve, Wellington
Umpires: BL Aldridge and SJ Woodward
Player of the match: KR Rutherford (NZ)

- New Zealand won the toss and elected to bat.
- There was no play on the fourth and fifth days.
- RH Vance (NZ) made his Test debut.

== One Day Internationals (ODIs) ==
The Rothmans Cup was drawn 2-2.

=== 1st ODI ===
9 March 1988
Scorecard

New Zealand; 204 (49.4 overs)	v	England; 207/5 (49.2 overs)
JG Wright 70 (92); JE Emburey 4/39 (9.4 overs)		NH Fairbrother 50* (75); EJ Chatfield 2/15 (10 overs)

England won by 5 wickets
Carisbrook, Dunedin
Umpires: RL McHarg and GC Morris
Player of the match: JG Wright (NZ)

- New Zealand won the toss and elected to bat.
- MJ Greatbatch, CM Kuggeleijn and RB Reid (all NZ) made their ODI debuts.

=== 2nd ODI ===
12 March 1988
Scorecard

New Zealand; 186/8 (45 overs)	v	England; 188/4 (42.5 overs)
JG Wright 43 (73); JG Bracewell 43 (49); JE Emburey 3/38 (9 overs)		BC Broad 56 (78); W Watson 2/31 (9 overs)

England won by 6 wickets
Lancaster Park, Christchurch
Umpires: BL Aldridge and GC Morris
Player of the match: BC Broad (ENG)

- England won the toss and elected to field.
- The match was reduced before play started to 45 overs per side.

=== 3rd ODI ===
16 March 1988
Scorecard

England; 219 (47.3 overs)	v	New Zealand; 223/3 (46.3 overs)
BC Broad 106 (140); MC Snedden 4/34 (8.3 overs)		JG Wright 101 (120); PAJ DeFreitas 1/30 (10 overs)

New Zealand won by 7 wickets
McLean Park, Napier
Umpires: FR Goodall and SJ Woodward
Player of the match: JG Wright (NZ)

- New Zealand won the toss and elected to field.
- RH Vance (NZ) made his ODI debut.

=== 4th ODI ===
19 March 1988
Scorecard

England; 208 (50 overs)	v	New Zealand; 211/6 (49.2 overs)
NH Fairbrother 54 (65); EJ Chatfield 3/31 (10 overs)		AH Jones 90 (126); PW Jarvis 4/33 (9.2 overs)

New Zealand won by 4 wickets
Eden Park, Auckland
Umpires: RL McHarg and SJ Woodward
Player of the match: AH Jones (NZ)

- New Zealand won the toss and elected to field.
