= Australian cricket team in New Zealand in 1981–82 =

International cricket tour

The Australian cricket team toured New Zealand in the 1981–82 season to play three-match One Day International and Test series against New Zealand. The first ODI was won by New Zealand before a record 42,000 fans, but Australia won the series 2–1. The Test series was drawn 1-1, with the first Test washed out.

== Australian squad ==
The original squad selected was as follows:

- Batsmen - Greg Chappell (captain), Kim Hughes, Graeme Wood, Allan Border, John Dyson, Bruce Laird
- Fastbowlers - Dennis Lillee, Terry Alderman, Len Pascoe, Jeff Thomson
- Spinners - Ray Bright, Bruce Yardley
- Wicketkeepers - Rod Marsh

== One Day Internationals (ODIs) ==
Australia won the Rothmans Cup 2–1.

=== 1st ODI ===
13 February 1982
Scorecard

New Zealand; 240/6 (50 overs)	v	Australia; 194 (44.5 overs)
BA Edgar 79 (119); LS Pascoe 1/35 (10 overs)		GS Chappell 108 (92); GB Troup 4/44 (10 overs)

New Zealand won by 46 runs
Eden Park, Auckland
Umpires: BA Bricknell and JBR Hastie
Player of the match: GS Chappell (AUS)

- Australia won the toss and elected to field.
- MD Crowe (NZ) made his ODI debut.

=== 2nd ODI ===
17 February 1982
Scorecard

New Zealand; 159/9 (49 overs)	v	Australia; 160/4 (45 overs)
JV Coney 54 (88); TM Alderman 3/22 (10 overs)		BM Laird 71* (125); RJ Hadlee 2/24 (9 overs)

Australia won by 6 wickets
Carisbrook, Dunedin
Umpires: FR Goodall and DA Kinsella
Player of the match: AR Border (AUS)

- Australia won the toss and elected to field.
- The match was reduced from 50 overs to 49 overs per side.
- BR Blair (NZ) made his ODI debut.

=== 3rd ODI ===
20 February 1982
Scorecard

New Zealand; 74 (29 overs)	v	Australia; 75/2 (20.3 overs)
RJ Hadlee 18 (31); TM Alderman 5/17 (10 overs)		J Dyson 26* (53); BL Cairns 1/12 (4 overs)

Australia won by 8 wickets
Basin Reserve, Wellington
Umpires: FR Goodall and SJ Woodward
Player of the match: TM Alderman (AUS)

- Australia won the toss and elected to field.

== Test series summary ==
=== First Test ===
26 February–2 March 1982
(5-day match)
Scorecard

New Zealand	v	Australia
266/7d (116 overs); GP Howarth 58* (135); B Yardley 3/49 (23 overs)		85/1 (38 overs); GM Wood 41 (81); BL Cairns 1/20 (11 overs)

Match drawn
Basin Reserve, Wellington
Umpires: FR Goodall and SJ Woodward
Player of the match: BA Edgar (NZ)

- Australia won the toss and elected to field.
- There was no play on the first or fourth days.
- MD Crowe (NZ) made his Test debut.

=== Second Test ===
12–16 March 1982
(5-day match)
Scorecard

Australia	v	New Zealand
210 (68.3 overs); BM Laird 38 (79); GB Troup 4/82 (18.3 overs)		387 (150.3 overs); BA Edgar 161 (418); B Yardley 4/142 (56 overs)
280 (138 overs); GM Wood 100 (249); RJ Hadlee 5/63 (28 overs)		109/5 (29.4 overs); BL Cairns 34 (21); B Yardley 2/40 (7.4 overs)

New Zealand won by 5 wickets
Eden Park, Auckland
Umpires: BA Bricknell and SJ Woodward
Player of the match: BA Edgar (NZ)

- New Zealand won the toss and elected to field.

=== Third Test ===
19–22 March 1982
(5-day match)
Scorecard

Australia	v	New Zealand
353 (89.5 overs); GS Chappell 176 (218); RJ Hadlee 6/100 (28.5 overs)		149 (52.2 overs); RJ Hadlee 40 (58); JR Thomson 4/51 (21 overs)
69/2 (25.3 overs); BM Laird 31 (65); RJ Hadlee 1/10 (8 overs)		272 (f/o) (97.3 overs); JG Wright 141 (262); B Yardley 4/80 (21 overs)

Australia won by 8 wickets
Lancaster Park, Christchurch
Umpires: FR Goodall and DA Kinsella
Player of the match: GS Chappell (AUS)

- New Zealand won the toss and elected to field.
- The match was scheduled for five days but completed in four.
