= West Indian cricket team in New Zealand in 1986–87 =

International cricket tour

The West Indies cricket team toured New Zealand in February to March 1987 and played a three-match Test series against the New Zealand national cricket team which was drawn 1–1. New Zealand were captained by Jeremy Coney and the West Indies by Vivian Richards. In addition, the teams played a four-match series of Limited Overs Internationals (LOI) which West Indies won 3–0.

== Test series summary ==
=== First Test ===
20–24 February 1987
(5-day match)
Scorecard

New Zealand	v	West Indies
228 (89 overs); JG Wright 75 (172); J Garner 5/51 (27 overs)		345 (128 overs); DL Haynes 121 (269); EJ Chatfield 4/102 (39 overs)
386/5d (177 overs); JG Wright 138 (465); J Garner 2/72 (30 overs)		50/2 (22 overs); CG Greenidge 25 (70); SL Boock 2/8 (7 overs)

Match drawn
Basin Reserve, Wellington
Umpires: BL Aldridge and SJ Woodward
Player of the match: JG Wright (NZ)

- West Indies won the toss and elected to field.
- DN Patel (NZ) made his Test debut.

=== Second Test ===
27 February–3 March 1987
(5-day match)
Scorecard

West Indies	v	New Zealand
418/9d (142.4 overs); CG Greenidge 213 (384); RJ Hadlee 6/105 (41.4 overs)		157 (53 overs); IDS Smith 40* (40); MD Marshall 4/43 (17 overs)
16/0 (1.3 overs); CG Greenidge 10* (6)		273 (f/o) (111.2 overs); MD Crowe 104 (264); CA Walsh 5/73 (30.2 overs)

West Indies won by 10 wickets
Eden Park, Auckland
Umpires: FR Goodall and GC Morris
Player of the match: CG Greenidge (WIN)

- West Indies won the toss and elected to bat.
- Michael Holding played his final international match.

=== Third Test ===
12–15 March 1987
(5-day match)
Scorecard

West Indies	v	New Zealand
100 (36.3 overs); RB Richardson 37 (65); RJ Hadlee 6/50 (12.3 overs)		332/9d (100.5 overs); MD Crowe 83 (154); J Garner 4/79 (19 overs)
264 (70.3 overs); MD Marshall 45 (62); MC Snedden 5/68 (18.3 overs)		33/5 (10.1 overs); MD Crowe 9* (17); DN Patel 9 (10); CA Walsh 3/16 (5.1 overs)

New Zealand won by 5 wickets
Lancaster Park, Christchurch
Umpires: GC Morris and SJ Woodward
Player of the match: RJ Hadlee and EJ Chatfield (both NZ)

- New Zealand won the toss and elected to field.
- There was no play on the first day.
- The match was scheduled for five days but completed in four.
- PA Horne (NZ) made his Test debut.
- Joel Garner played his last test match.

== One Day Internationals (ODIs) ==
West Indies won the Rothmans Cup 3–0, with one match abandoned.

=== 1st ODI ===
18 March 1987
Scorecard

West Indies; 237/9 (50 overs)	v	New Zealand; 142 (42.1 overs)
IVA Richards 119 (113); JV Coney 2/34 (2 overs)		JG Wright 34 (68); IVA Richards 5/41 (10 overs)

West Indies won by 95 runs
Carisbrook, Dunedin
Umpires: FR Goodall and GC Morris
Player of the match: IVA Richards (WI)

- New Zealand won the toss and elected to field.
- PA Horne and DN Patel (both NZ), and CL Hooper (WI) made their ODI debuts.

=== 2nd ODI ===
21 March 1987
Scorecard

New Zealand; 213 (50 overs)	v	West Indies; 217/4 (49 overs)
MD Crowe 53 (86); IVA Richards 3/34 (10 overs)		CG Greenidge 104 (100); JG Bracewell 2/40 (10 overs)

West Indies won by 6 wickets
Eden Park, Auckland
Umpires: BL Aldridge and RL McHarg
Player of the match: CG Greenidge (WI)

- West Indies won the toss and elected to field.

=== 3rd ODI ===
25, 26 March 1987
Scorecard

New Zealand	v	West Indies

Match abandoned
Basin Reserve, Wellington

- No toss.
- Reserve day used. Three days of heavy rain left the ground too waterlogged to play on.

=== 4th ODI ===
28 March 1987
Scorecard

New Zealand; 191/9 (50 overs)	v	West Indies; 192/0 (39.2 overs)
MD Crowe 42 (71); CL Hooper 3/27 (6 overs)		CG Greenidge 133* (140)

West Indies won by 10 wickets
Lancaster Park, Christchurch
Umpires: BL Aldridge and FR Goodall
Player of the match: CG Greenidge (WI)

- New Zealand won the toss and elected to bat.
- Joel Garner played his final international match.
