= Sri Lankan cricket team in New Zealand in 1990–91 =

International cricket tour

The Sri Lankan national cricket team toured New Zealand January to March 1991 and played a three-match Test series against the New Zealand national cricket team. The series was drawn 0–0. New Zealand were captained by Martin Crowe and Sri Lanka by Arjuna Ranatunga. In addition, the teams played a three-match series of Limited Overs Internationals (LOI) which New Zealand won 3–0.

== Test series summary ==
=== 1st Test ===
31 January–4 February 1991
(5-day match)
Scorecard

New Zealand	v	Sri Lanka
174 (58.2 overs); MD Crowe 30 (71); RJ Ratnayake 4/45 (18.2 overs)		497 (151.1 overs); PA de Silva 267 (380); DK Morrison 5/153 (44 overs)
671/4 (220.3 overs); MD Crowe 299 (523); A Ranatunga 2/60 (19.3 overs)

Match drawn
Basin Reserve, Wellington
Umpires: BL Aldridge and SJ Woodward
Player of the match: MD Crowe (NZ)

- Sri Lanka won the toss and elected to field.
- CP Senanayake (SL) made his Test debut.

=== 2nd Test ===
22–26 February 1991
(5-day match)
Scorecard

New Zealand	v	Sri Lanka
296 (121.4 overs); AH Jones 122 (217); RJ Ratnayake 5/77 (30.4 overs)		253 (93.4 overs); AP Gurusinha 119 (261); W Watson 3/65 (26.4 overs)
374/6d (105 overs); JG Wright 101 (140); EAR de Silva 2/89 (24 overs)		344/6 (125 overs); AP Gurusinha 102 (239); W Watson 2/75 (37 overs)

Match drawn
Trust Bank Park, Hamilton
Umpires: BL Aldridge and RS Dunne

- Sri Lanka won the toss and elected to field.
- UP Hathurusingha and ST Jayasuriya (both SL) made their Test debuts.
- Ian Smith (NZ) equalled the record of taking seven dismissals in a Test innings as the designated wicket-keeper.

=== 3rd Test ===
1–5 March 1991
(5-day match)
Scorecard

Sri Lanka	v	New Zealand
380 (105 overs); PA de Silva 96 (141); CL Cairns 4/136 (32 overs)		317 (115.3 overs); JG Wright 84 (168); GF Labrooy 3/48 (21.3 overs)
319 (98 overs); PA de Silva 123 (193); CL Cairns 5/75 (27 overs)		261/5 (99 overs); SA Thomson 80* (144); GF Labrooy 4/42 (19 overs)

Match drawn
Eden Park, Auckland
Umpires: BL Aldridge and RL McHarg
Player of the match: PA de Silva (SL)

- New Zealand won the toss and elected to field.

== One Day Internationals (ODIs) ==
New Zealand won the Bank of New Zealand Trophy 3-0.

=== 1st ODI ===
26 January 1991
Scorecard

Sri Lanka; 177/8 (50 overs)	v	New Zealand; 178/5 (42.3 overs)
A Ranatunga 29 (59); GR Larsen 2/25 (10 overs)		JG Wright 64 (113); RJ Ratnayake 2/27 (8.3 overs)

New Zealand won by 5 wickets
McLean Park, Napier
Umpires: GIJ Cowan and SJ Woodward
Player of the match: JG Wright (NZ)

- New Zealand won the toss and elected to field.

=== 2nd ODI ===
28 January 1991
Scorecard

New Zealand; 242/5 (50 overs)	v	Sri Lanka; 201 (44.4 overs)
AH Jones 64* (76); EAR de Silva 1/41 (10 overs)		AP Gurusinha 81 (90); W Watson 2/25 (7.4 overs)

New Zealand won by 41 runs
Eden Park, Auckland
Umpires: BL Aldridge and RS Dunne
Player of the match: C Pringle (NZ)

- Sri Lanka won the toss and elected to field.

=== 3rd ODI ===
6 February 1991
Scorecard

New Zealand; 272/6 (50 overs)	v	Sri Lanka; 165 (33.1 overs)
KR Rutherford 65 (78); A Ranatunga 2/39 (10 overs)		A Ranatunga 50 (59); W Watson 3/39 (7 overs)

New Zealand won by 107 runs
Carisbrook, Dunedin
Umpires: RS Dunne and RL McHarg
Player of the match: KR Rutherford (NZ)

- Sri Lanka won the toss and elected to field.
