= John Wilson (New Zealand cricketer) =

New Zealand cricketer

Personal information
- Full name: Thomas John Wilson
- Born: 7 July 1957 (age 69); Invercargill, Southland, New Zealand
- Batting: Left-handed
- Bowling: Right-arm medium
- Role: Bowler

Domestic team information
- Years: Team
- 1977/78–1989/90: Southland
- 1982/83–1988/89: Otago
- Source: CricInfo, 28 May 2016

Thomas John Wilson (born 7 July 1957) is a former cricketer from New Zealand. He played 33 first-class and 19 List A matches, almost all for Otago between the 1982–83 and 1988–89 seasons.

Wilson was born in Invercargill, Southland, in 1957. He played for Otago age-group sides from the 1974–75 season and the Southland cricket team in the Hawke Cup in 1977–78. He was a regular for the team in the competition until the end of the 1989–90 season and played senior cricket for Otago from 1982–83 until 1988–89.

Primarily playing as a bowler, Wilson made his senior debut for Otago in a List A match against Central Districts in January 1983, taking four wickets on debut. He played one more match during the season, but did not appear for the provincial team the following season. From the 1984–85 season, however, Wilson was a regular on the Otago side, making his first-class debut during the season and playing 31 first-class and 19 List A fixtures for the side. He won the Plunket Shield with the team in 1985–86 before being part of the team which won both the Shield and the List A Shell Cup during the 1987–88 season. Wilson took 24 wickets in Shield matches during the season and hit the winning runs in the final of the Cup.

As well as the matches he played for Otago, Wilson played first-class matches for a domestic XI against the touring West Indians in 1986–87 and for a Presidents XI side against the touring English team in 1987–88. He played his final matches for Otago during the 1988–89 season, competing his career with 85 first-class and 26 List A wickets for the team. His brother Bill Wilson played Hawke Cup cricket for Southland whilst his nephew, Bill's son Jeff Wilson is a former Double All Black, having played both cricket and rugby union for New Zealand.
