= New Zealand cricket team in Australia in 1985–86 =

International cricket tour

The New Zealand national cricket team toured Australia in the 1985-86 season and played 3 Test matches against Australia. New Zealand won the series 2-1.

This is the New Zealanders only series victory to date in Australia and the architect was Richard Hadlee who took an outstanding 33 wickets in 3 Tests.

In the first Test at Brisbane he took 9-52 in the Australians first innings and a further 6-71 in the second. 15 wickets in the match. In the third test in Perth he took 11 more wickets.

== Test series summary ==
=== First Test ===
8–12 November 1985
(5-day match)
Scorecard

Australia	v	New Zealand
179 (76.4 overs); KC Wessels 70 (186); RJ Hadlee 9/52 (23.4 overs)		7/553d (161 overs); MD Crowe 188 (328); GRJ Matthews 3/110 (31 overs)
333 (116.5 overs); AR Border 152* (301); RJ Hadlee 6/71 (28.5 overs)

New Zealand won by an innings and 41 runs
Brisbane Cricket Ground, Woolloongabba, Brisbane
Umpires: AR Crafter and RA French
Player of the match: RJ Hadlee (NZ)

- New Zealand won the toss and elected to field.
- VR Brown (NZ) made his Test debut.

=== Second Test ===
22–26 November 1985
(5-day match)
Scorecard

New Zealand	v	Australia
293 (124.3 overs); JG Bracewell 83* (120); RG Holland 6/106 (47 overs)		227 (97.5 overs); GM Ritchie 89 (254); RJ Hadlee 5/65 (24 overs)
193 (102.5 overs); BA Edgar 52 (144); RG Holland 4/68 (41 overs)		6/260 (97.1 overs); DC Boon 81 (198); JG Bracewell 3/91 (30 overs)

Australia won by 4 wickets
Sydney Cricket Ground, Sydney
Umpires: MW Johnson and BE Martin
Player of the match: JG Bracewell (NZ)

- Australia won the toss and elected to field.
- RB Kerr (AUS) made his Test debut.

=== Third Test ===
30 November–4 December 1985
(5-day match)
Scorecard

Australia	v	New Zealand
203 (83.5 overs); WB Phillips 37 (77); RJ Hadlee 5/65 (26.5 overs)		299 (157 overs); BA Edgar 74 (291); GF Lawson 4/79 (47 overs)
259 (131.5 overs); AR Border 83 (244); RJ Hadlee 6/90 (39 overs)		4/164 (74 overs); MD Crowe 42* (118); DR Gilbert 3/48 (23 overs)

New Zealand won by 6 wickets
Western Australia Cricket Association Ground, Perth
Umpires: RC Isherwood and PJ McConnell
Player of the match: RJ Hadlee (NZ)

- New Zealand won the toss and elected to field.

== World Series Cup ==
New Zealanders also played in the Benson and Hedges World Series Cup in that season alongside Australia and India. They finished third and did not qualify for the best of three finals.

== External sources ==
ESPNcricinfo
