= Jeet Raval =

New Zealand cricketer

Personal information
- Full name: Jeet Ashok Raval
- Born: 22 September 1988 (age 38); Ahmedabad, Gujarat, India
- Height: 1.86 m (6 ft 1 in)
- Batting: Left-handed
- Bowling: Right-arm leg break
- Role: Opening batsman

International information
- National side: New Zealand (2016–2020)
- Test debut (cap 271): 17 November 2016 v Pakistan
- Last Test: 5 January 2020 v Australia

Domestic team information
- Years: Team
- 2008/09–2009/10: Auckland
- 2012/13: Central Districts
- 2013/14–2019/20: Auckland
- 2018: Yorkshire
- 2020/21–: Northern Districts

Career statistics
Competition	Test	FC	LA	T20
Matches	24	164	96	76
Runs scored	1,143	10,432	2,714	1,484
Batting average	30.07	37.66	30.15	21.50
100s/50s	1/7	24/50	4/13	0/8
Top score	132	256	149	70
Balls bowled	84	2,739	182	–
Wickets	1	44	5	–
Bowling average	34.00	37.81	35.40	–
5 wickets in innings	0	1	0	–
10 wickets in match	0	0	0	–
Best bowling	1/33	5/43	2/6	–
Catches/stumpings	21/–	196/–	63/–	42/–
- Source: Cricinfo, 28 October 2026

Jeet Ashok Raval (born 22 September 1988) is a New Zealand cricketer. Raval is an opening batsman, who has played for New Zealand internationally and Northern Districts domestically. Originally from Ahmedabad in India, Raval played cricket for New Zealand's under-19 team and then spent eight years playing first-class cricket as an opening batsman for Auckland and Central Districts before being selected to play Test cricket for New Zealand for the first time in 2016. Raval initially struggled for form and it took 17 Test matches and 7 half-centuries before he scored his maiden Test century against Bangladesh. He retired in 2026.

== Early life and youth cricket ==
Raval was born and raised in Ahmedabad in India, where he grew up playing cricket in his backyard with his cousins, ultimately being successful enough at the sport to represent the state of Gujarat at under-15 and under-17 level. Raval began as a medium-pace bowler in his first match for Gujarat, but after scoring more than 20 runs batting down the order and almost saving a match for the team, his coach asked him to bat higher up the order in the next match, and he scored a century. From then on, Raval focused on his batting.

When Raval was 16, his family moved to Auckland in New Zealand. Raval initially struggled to adjust to the language and culture. He tried to get a job at a Subway but was unable to because he didn't understand what a CV was. His father started working at a petrol station, where by chance he met Kit Perera, the Sri Lankan-born cricket coach of the Suburbs New Lynn Cricket Club. Raval started playing cricket for this club as well as his school, Avondale College, in late 2004. He played well and was selected for Auckland's under-17s team, then in later years their under-19s team. This led to his selection in New Zealand's national under-19 team, where he was mentored by former international cricketer Dipak Patel. At the time he had not lived in New Zealand long enough to represent the country in international cricket, restricting him to their under-19 team.

Raval played for New Zealand Under-19s in both a youth Test series and a youth ODI series against India. In the third Test match he scored 70 and 89 in the two innings, finishing as New Zealand's second-highest run scorer for the series. It was during this series that Raval fully identified with the culture of New Zealand cricket and saw a future for himself playing for New Zealand rather than for India. Raval did not fare as well in the ODIs, only scoring 9 runs in two matches.

== Domestic career ==
Raval made his first-class cricket debut for Auckland in December 2008 during a tour match against the West Indies. Later that season, in March 2009, he played his first matches for Auckland in the State Championship (now known as the Plunket Shield), New Zealand's first-class domestic championship. In just his second full first-class match he made a double-century, scoring 256 runs over 10 hours, the equal third-highest score ever for Auckland. (Note: This was the third first-class match in which Raval had taken to the field, but in the second match he only played as a replacement player for Tim McIntosh for the last two days and did not bat.) He earned his first contract with Auckland for the 2009–10 season.

For the next eight seasons, Raval played first-class cricket for Auckland (aside from one season playing for Central Districts). By 2015, he had scored more than 3,500 runs in 54 first-class matches and had consistently averaged above 40 in almost every season. His 2015–16 season was especially prolific, as he scored 1016 runs at an average of 59.76 in 10 first-class matches (for New Zealand A and Auckland), and Auckland won the Plunket Shield, earning him the attention of New Zealand's national selectors.

In June 2020, he was offered a contract by Northern Districts ahead of the 2020–21 domestic cricket season.

== International career ==
In June 2016, Raval was named in New Zealand's Test squad for their tours to Zimbabwe and South Africa, which took place in July and August, but after he didn't play a match for New Zealand in either tour he was subsequently left out of New Zealand's squad for their tour of India, due in part to questions over his ability to face spin bowling.

Raval was finally selected to make his Test debut for New Zealand in November 2016 in a home series against Pakistan, replacing out-of-form batsman Martin Guptill. Raval opened the batting for New Zealand and finished the first day of play not out on 55 runs after New Zealand had bowled out Pakistan for 133. He followed this up in the second innings with an impressive 36 not out, hitting the winning runs for New Zealand with a boundary off the bowling of Yasir Shah. He also took four catches in the match, the most by any New Zealand non-wicketkeeper on debut.

For the first few years of his Test career, Raval was unable to score his maiden Test century. In his first seven Test matches, he scored five half-centuries but the closest he got to a century in his first season was 88 runs against South Africa. He finished the 2016–17 season with 493 Test runs at an average of 44.81, and he earned a central contract with New Zealand Cricket for the 2017–18 season. A Test century continued to elude him as he scored 84 in a Test match against the West Indies in December 2017.

In February 2018, during a domestic one-day match in New Zealand for Auckland, Raval hit an unusual six off of Canterbury fast bowler Andrew Ellis. He hit the ball directly back to the bowler, and it ricocheted off of his head and over the long-off boundary for six runs. Ellis passed a concussion test and was allowed to continue bowling, and Raval went on to score 149 runs before being dismissed by Ellis. In May 2018, he was one of twenty players to be awarded a new contract for the 2018–19 season by New Zealand Cricket, and in August 2018 he was signed by county cricket club Yorkshire to replace the injured fellow New Zealander Kane Williamson.

Raval had a rough patch, and by the end of the year his 2018 batting average dropped as low as 19.90 before he scored his seventh Test half-century against Sri Lanka in the Boxing Day Test Match, again failing to convert it into his maiden Test century but raising his yearly average up to 23.25. In March 2019, Raval finally scored his first century in his 17th Test match, scoring 132 runs against Bangladesh as part of a 254-run opening partnership with Tom Latham after having held the record for the most half-centuries for a New Zealander without passing the milestone. This was the highest first-wicket partnership New Zealand had ever had against Bangladesh and the third-highest against any team.

Raval announced his retirement from professional cricket in October 2026.

== Personal life ==
Raval married Surabhi on 9 May 2016 in Ahmedabad. They had their honeymoon in Europe, but it was cut short by Raval's inclusion in New Zealand's national squad.

He works as a chartered accountant for the accounting company BDO New Zealand.
