= New Zealand cricket team in South Africa in 2016 =

International cricket tour

	South Africa	New Zealand
- Dates: 19 August 2016 – 31 August 2016
Captains	Faf du Plessis	Kane Williamson

Test series
- Result: South Africa won the 2-match series 1–0
Most runs	Quinton de Kock (165)	Henry Nicholls (112)
Most wickets	Dale Steyn (10)	Neil Wagner (9)

The New Zealand cricket team toured South Africa from 19 to 31 August 2016 for a two-match Test series. Faf du Plessis was named as the stand-in captain for South Africa, after AB de Villiers suffered an elbow injury.

The first Test at Durban was the earliest that a Test match had been played in the South African summer. There has never been any Tests in South Africa in September either. The previous earliest was the first Test of the 1902–03 series against Australia, which started in Johannesburg on 11 October 1902.

South Africa won the series 1–0, with a 204-run victory in the second Test after most of the play in the first Test was affected by rain. It was South Africa's fifth consecutive series win against New Zealand.

== Squads ==
South Africa	New Zealand
Faf du Plessis (c); Kyle Abbott; Hashim Amla; Temba Bavuma; Stephen Cook; Quinton de Kock (wk); JP Duminy; Dean Elgar; Chris Morris; Wayne Parnell; Vernon Philander; Dane Piedt; Kagiso Rabada; Dale Steyn; Stiaan van Zyl	Kane Williamson (c); Trent Boult; Doug Bracewell; Mark Craig; Martin Guptill; Matt Henry; Tom Latham; Henry Nicholls; Luke Ronchi; Jeet Raval; Mitchell Santner; Ish Sodhi; Tim Southee; Ross Taylor; Neil Wagner; BJ Watling (wk)

== Test series ==
=== 1st Test ===
19–23 August 2016
Scorecard

South Africa	v	New Zealand
263 (87.4 overs); Hashim Amla 53 (71); Neil Wagner 3/47 (15 overs)		15/2 (12 overs); Martin Guptill 7 (23); Dale Steyn 2/3 (6 overs)

Match drawn
Kingsmead, Durban
Umpires: Ian Gould (Eng) and Richard Illingworth (Eng)

- South Africa won the toss and elected to bat.
- Bad light stopped play at the end of Day 1.
- Rain stopped play after lunch on Day 2 with no further play possible.
- No play was possible on Days 3, 4 and 5 due to a wet outfield.

=== 2nd Test ===
27–31 August 2016
Scorecard

South Africa	v	New Zealand
481/8d (154 overs); Faf du Plessis 112* (234); Neil Wagner 5/86 (39 overs)		214 (58.3 overs); Kane Williamson 77 (133); Kagiso Rabada 3/62 (16.3 overs)
132/7d (47 overs); Quinton de Kock 50 (43); Tim Southee 3/46 (16 overs)		195 (58.2 overs); Henry Nicholls 76 (140); Dale Steyn 5/33 (16.2 overs)

South Africa won by 204 runs
Centurion Park, Centurion
Umpires: Ian Gould (Eng) and Paul Reiffel (Aus)
Player of the match: Quinton de Kock (SA)

- New Zealand won the toss and elected to field.
- Hashim Amla (SA) scored his 1,000th run against New Zealand in Tests.
