= Gordon Greenidge =

West Indian cricketer (born 1951)

Sir Gordon Greenidge KCMG MBE
Personal information
- Full name: Cuthbert Gordon Greenidge
- Born: 1 May 1951 (age 75); St Peter, Barbados
- Batting: Right-handed
- Bowling: Right-arm medium/off-break
- Role: Opening batsman
- Relatives: Carl Greenidge (son); Mark Lavine (cousin); Ria Greenidge (daughter)

International information
- National side: West Indies (1974-1991)
- Test debut (cap 150): 22 November 1974 v India
- Last Test: 27 April 1991 v Australia
- ODI debut (cap 16): 11 June 1975 v Pakistan
- Last ODI: 25 May 1991 v England

Domestic team information
- Years: Team
- 1970–1987: Hampshire
- 1973–1991: Barbados
- 1990: Scotland

Career statistics
Competition	Test	ODI	FC	LA
Matches	108	128	523	440
Runs scored	7,558	5,134	37,354	16,349
Batting average	44.72	45.03	45.88	40.56
100s/50s	19/34	11/31	92/183	33/94
Top score	226	133*	273*	186*
Balls bowled	26	60	955	286
Wickets	0	1	18	2
Bowling average	–	45.00	26.61	105.50
5 wickets in innings	–	0	1	0
10 wickets in match	–	0	0	0
Best bowling	–	1/21	5/49	1/21
Catches/stumpings	96/–	45/–	516/–	172/–
Medal record
Men's Cricket
Representing West Indies
ICC Cricket World Cup
Winner	1975 England
Winner	1979 England
Runner-up	1983 England and Wales
- Source: CricketArchive, 24 January 2009

Sir Cuthbert Gordon Greenidge KCMG MBE (born 1 May 1951) is a Barbadian retired cricketer who represented the West Indies in Test and One Day International (ODI) teams for 17 years, as well as Barbados and Hampshire in first-class cricket. Greenidge is regarded worldwide as one of the greatest and most destructive opening batsmen in cricket history. In 2009, Greenidge was inducted into the ICC Cricket Hall of Fame. He was a member of the squads which won the World Cups in 1975, 1979 and runners-up in 1983.

== Early life ==
Born Cuthbert Gordon Lavine in Saint Peter, Barbados, Greenidge was raised by his mother. At the ages of 8 and 14, he was raised by his grandmother after his mother moved to London, England to find work. His mother married, and Gordon moved to Reading as a 14-year-old to live with her and his stepfather. He described racism frequently while attending school in Reading and left school without any qualifications. He played cricket for his school, and the team won the Reading Schools Cricket League. He was selected to play for the Berkshire Bantams in 1967 and scored 135 runs in their game against Wiltshire. This attracted the attention of Hampshire and Warwickshire County Cricket Clubs, who offered Greenidge a trial.

== Domestic career ==
Greenidge began his career in English county cricket with Hampshire in the English County Championship. He joined in April 1968 as a 17-year-old playing for the second eleven and was also given responsibilities such as painting the seating at the ground. His fielding at this stage "left much to be desired". Nearly losing his contract, Greenidge applied himself over the winter and in 1970 scored 841 runs in 15 second eleven matches and eventually broke into the Hampshire first eleven team averaging 35 in seven matches with four scores over fifty.

He batted as an opener with Barry Richards for Hampshire, first playing together in August 1970. Greenidge said of the experience of playing alongside Richards was "something I shall never forget. It was an education and an inspiration. If, at the end of my career, people talk of Richards and Greenidge in the same breath, then I for one will not mind it in the least". During his first-class career, he scored a total of 37,000 runs with 92 centuries.

In 1974, Greenidge scored his highest first-class score of 273 not out at Eastbourne for Derrick Robin's XI against the Pakistani side who were touring England that year. He said that he had drunk too much lager the night before and had woken up with "the most dreadful hangover". He did not recollect the innings saying "I middled every ball and yet hardly saw one delivery clearly...I can't remember a single shot but when I returned to the pavilion rather later than I had anticipated, I discovered I had made 273 not out". He hit 13 sixes and 31 fours in the innings.

In 1984, Greenidge achieved the highest batting average of any player during the English season. In his 16 innings, he scored 1,069 runs at an average of 82.23.

He was appointed a Member of the Order of the British Empire (MBE) in the 1985 New Year Honours for services to cricket. Greenidge received the ‘Hampshire Cricket Society Player of the Year’ in 1986 and played his final season for Hampshire in 1987.

Greenidge holds the record for the highest score for Hampshire in a 60-over game, of 177 against Glamorgan, and the highest score in a 40-over game for Hampshire, of 172 against Surrey.

== International career ==
Greenidge was eligible to play for England but he opted to play for the West Indies. He played as an opening batsman and he began his Test career in 1974 against India at M. Chinnaswamy Stadium, Bangalore, scoring 93 and 107 on debut.

Greenidge made his ODI debut against Pakistan in the 1975 World Cup. This was a quiet tournament for Greenidge, with his only innings of note being 55 in the semi-final against New Zealand. It took four more years to score an ODI century when he made 106 not out against India at Edgbaston Cricket Ground, Birmingham. His highest score of 133 was made against the same team shortly after the 1983 World Cup. All but two of his ODI centuries were match-winning ones.

The 1975–76 West Indian tour of Australia was considered by Greenidge as "personal nightmare so painful that I have spent my life since trying to erase it from my memory". Greenidge scored a total of 11 runs in four Test innings and the West Indies lost the series 5–1. He resolved, after that tour, to become "such a consistently high scorer that I could not be ignored". He said that "I knew from that point I had to tighten my game".

In the 1976 West Indian tour of England, Greenidge scored over a 1,000 runs for the West Indies. This included his 134 out of the West Indian total of 211 in the first innings and a further century in the second innings of the Old Trafford Test, 84 runs out of the West Indian total of 182 in the first innings of the test at Lord's and a century in the Test at Leeds. He scored a further five centuries for the West Indies on tour with one each against Somerset, Leicestershire, Middlesex, Glamorgan and Nottinghamshire. In 1977, Wisden named Gordon Greenidge the Cricketer of the Year.

Greenidge and Desmond Haynes formed a prolific opening partnership, first playing a Test match together in 1978. The pair made 6,482 runs while batting together in partnerships, the third highest total for a batting partnership in Test cricket history as of 2019. Haynes said of Greenidge: "Our opening partnership broke records, but Gordon was the better player. His technique was super, especially against spin". They enjoyed 16 century opening partnerships in Test matches. They also had success in ODIs with their batting partnerships yielding 5,150 runs at an average of 52.55.

Between 1977 and 1979, Greenidge joined the West Indies team to play in the WSC Super Tests. He was the fifth highest run scorer in this with a total of 754 runs in 13 matches.

Greenidge had a prolific 1979 World Cup scoring 253 runs (the most in the tournament) at an average of 84 with a century against India and 73 runs in the semi-final.

Greenidge released his autobiography during the 1980 tour of England and did not play well on that tour as a result. The Sun newspaper reported extracts of it with appropriately sensational headlines. Greenidge was very upset with what had been published and Clive Lloyd noted that "he was a rather quiet, reserved individual who took failure hard and who was particularly upset by his experiences in Australia in 1975-6 when he had a bad tour but I never expected this type of outburst."

During the 5th Test of the 1983 series between West Indies and India, Greenidge became the first and, as of 2021 only, person in Test history to be retired not out when not injured. He had to leave the match in Antigua while on 154 to visit his gravely ill daughter, who died two days later, in Barbados.

Greenidge continued scoring runs at the 1983 World Cup with a total of scoring 250 runs at an average of 41 including a century against Zimbabwe. The Final, the third that Greenidge had played in, was a disappointment as Greenidge was bowled out for 1 run in the loss to India.

Greenidge scored two double centuries against England in the 1984 summer Test series. This series was dubbed the "Blackwash" because the West Indies won by a margin of 5–0. Greenidge scored an unbeaten 214 in the second innings of the second Test at Lord's in June and followed up with 223 in the fourth Test at Old Trafford in late July.

The 214 was achieved on the fifth and last day of the match as the West Indies successfully chased 342 for victory. It remains the highest run chase at Lord's. The innings was described as "a sadistic uncle enjoying an afternoon's beach cricket against his nieces and nephews back home in Barbados". Haynes said of it: "We were chasing 342 on the final day, and everyone thought we'd bat out time, but Gordon had a different idea. He thought that, if he got going, he could get the runs in an afternoon, and he did". Chris Broad said "As far as the result was concerned it was a disaster; we lost a game we should have won… Things did not go too badly for the first four days, just on the last day things fell apart — or rather Greenidge pulled a big one out the bag. That innings taught me a bit about being a Test match opener."

In New Zealand in 1987, Greenidge scored his third Test double century in Auckland to lead the West Indies to a 10-wicket victory. He hit seven sixes and twenty fours in his innings batting for almost two full days. It was considered "a triumph of technique and temperament".

Greenidge became the first player in ODI history to score a century in his 100th ODI when he scored 102* against Pakistan in 1988. In that game, he achieved that milestone as captain, with his century eventually going in vain as West Indies lost that match.

Gordon Greenidge played in his 100th test match in 1990. This was the fifth test match against England at St Johns Cricket Ground in Antigua. Gordon Greenidge and Desmond Haynes opened the batting with Greenidge scoring 149 before being run out and Haynes scoring 167 runs. They had an opening partnership of 298 runs. The West Indies won the match by an innings and 32 runs.

His final double century was scored at home in Barbados when the West Indies played Australia in 1991. Leading into the game, Greenidge had been going through a lean patch, having scored one fifty in the last 24 innings. He hit an impressive 226 allowing the West Indies to beat Australia by 343 runs. This performance ensured his selection for the subsequent tour of England, which he announced would be his farewell series before retirement: unfortunately, he suffered a knee injury while fielding during the second match of the ODI series, was unable to open the batting (he was held back to 8th in the order), and was unable to play in either the third ODI or the subsequent Tests.

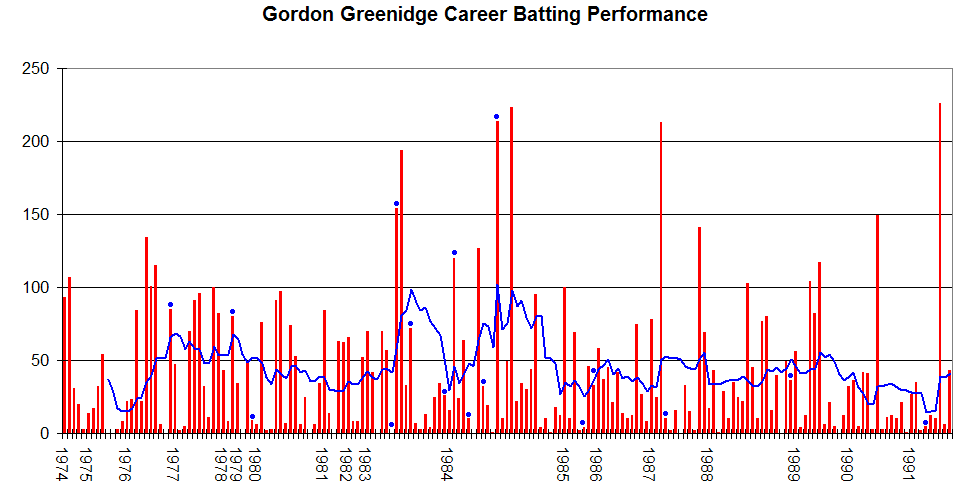
Gordon Greenidge's career performance graph

In total, Greenidge played in 108 Test matches, scoring 7,558 runs with 19 centuries, and in 128 ODIs, including the 1975 and 1983 World Cup Finals, scoring 5,134 runs and 11 centuries. He picked up the ‘Man of the Match’ award 20 times in ODIs and a further six times in test matches. He later made an appearance for Scotland.

Described by Cricinfo as "brooding and massively destructive", he was among the 55 initial inductees of the ICC Cricket Hall of Fame in 2009.

Clive Lloyd described Gordon Greenidge as "a very fine player of the moving ball and one of the hardest hitters in my experience. He is immensely strong in the shoulders and arms and he uses this strength to club the ball...he is a magnificent fielder, especially in the slips".

== Coaching ==
Gordon Greenidge decided to pursue a coaching career and became the coach of the Bangladeshi national cricket team in 1996. He was appointed the head coach of the Bangladesh national cricket team in 1997. Under his guidance, the Bangladesh men's cricket team won the 1997 ICC Trophy beating 22 other nations. This also ensured the qualification of Bangladesh to the 1999 ICC Cricket World Cup, which was the first ever appearance in top-level cricket. Participating in their very first cricket world cup changed Bangladesh cricket forever and lead to Test cricket status for the Bangladesh national cricket team in 2000, which meant Bangladesh was promoted to full ICC member status and began playing Test cricket matches. Soon after winning the 1997 ICC Trophy, Gordon Greenidge was conferred honorary citizenship of Bangladesh for these outstanding achievements of winning the 1997 ICC Trophy and simultaneously qualifying for the Cricket World Cup. He later served on the West Indies selection committee for Test matches, along with Sir Viv Richards.

== Personal life ==
Greenidge's son Carl is a former cricketer who coaches at Bancroft's School with John Lever. Carl also portrayed his father in the 2021 Indian film 83 which depicts the events of the 1983 Cricket World Cup. He was claimed to be the grandfather of Reiss Greenidge, who is a footballer. However, this was subsequently reported to be untrue.

He received honorary Bangladeshi citizenship for his contribution as a coach of the Bangladesh National Cricket Team. A primary school was named after him in 1993. The Gordon Greenidge Primary School is located in Barbados and was built to amalgamate the St. Boniface Primary School and the Black Bess Primary Schools.

He was appointed Knight Commander of the Order of St Michael and St George (KCMG) in the 2020 New Year Honours for services to cricket and to the development of sport.

== International cricket centuries ==
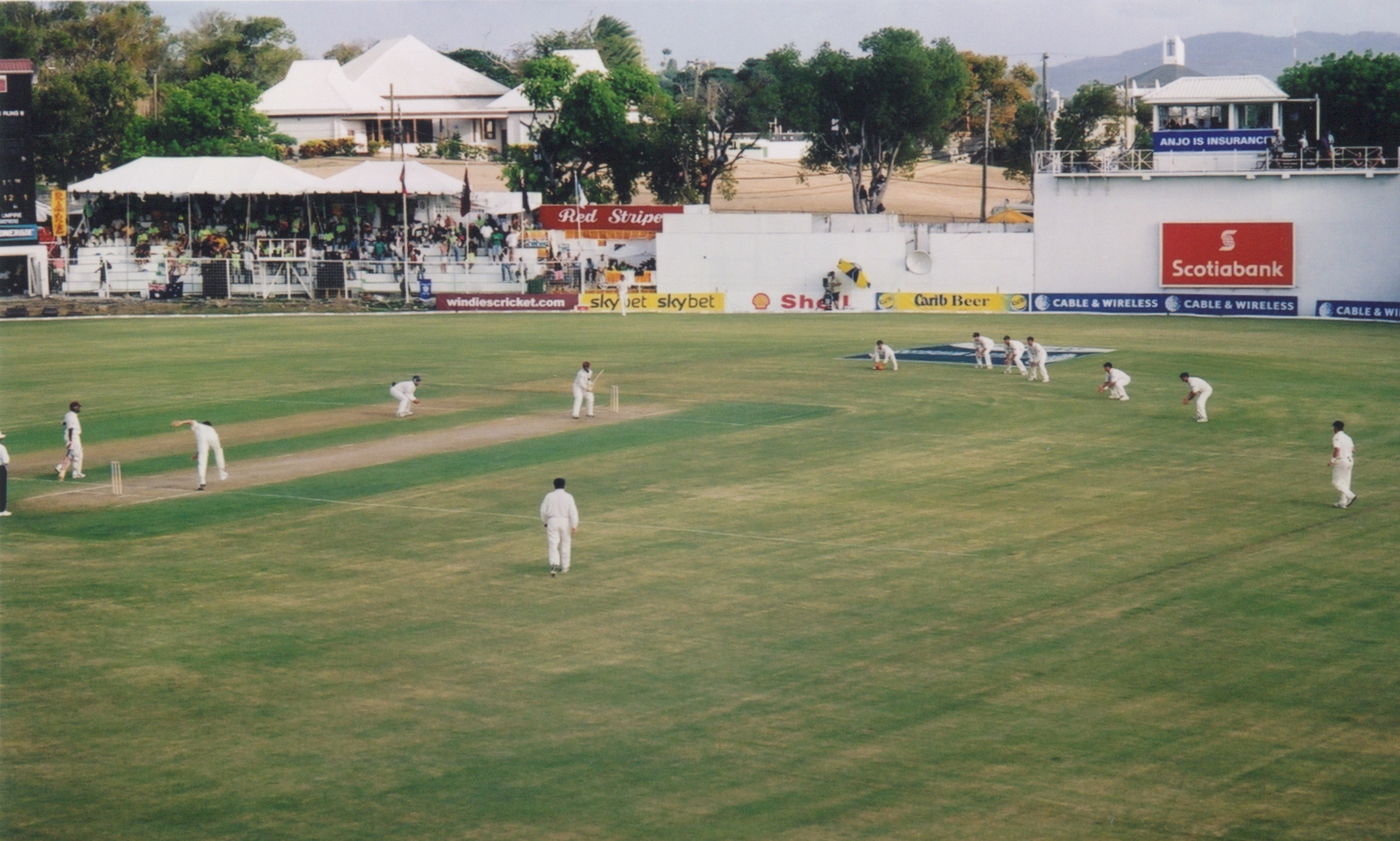
Three of Greenidge's thirty international centuries were scored at the Antigua Recreation Ground

Greenidge scored 19 Test and 11 ODI centuries. He made his first Test century on debut in 1974 against India. His 214 not out against England in 1984 remains the fifth-highest individual total in the fourth innings of a Test match as of August 2015. His highest score of 226—his final century—was made against Australia in April 1991. Three of his four double-centuries feature in the Wisden's top 100 batting performances of all time in a 2002 release. Greenidge holds the record for most centuries scored at Old Trafford. He was most prolific against England, accruing seven centuries.

Test centuries
No.	Score	Against	Pos.	Inn.	Venue	H/A/N	Date	Result	Ref
1	107	India	1	3	KSCA Stadium, Bangalore	Away	22 November 1974	Won	
2	134	England	2	1	Old Trafford, Manchester	Away	8 July 1976	Won	
3	101	England	2	3	Old Trafford, Manchester	Away	8 July 1976	Won	
4	115	England	2	1	Headingley, Leeds	Away	22 July 1976	Won	
5	100	Pakistan	2	1	Sabina Park, Kingston	Home	15 April 1977	Won	
6	154 not out	India	1	2	Antigua Recreation Ground, St. John's	Home	28 April 1983	Drawn	
7	194	India	1	1	Green Park Stadium, Kanpur	Away	21 October 1983	Won	
8	120 not out	Australia	1	4	Bourda, Georgetown	Home	2 March 1984	Drawn	
9	127	Australia	1	2	Sabina Park, Kingston	Home	28 April 1984	Won	
10	214 not out	England	1	4	Lord's, London	Away	28 June 1984	Won	
11	223	England	1	1	Old Trafford, Manchester	Away	26 July 1984	Won	
12	100	New Zealand	1	1	Queen's Park Oval, Port of Spain	Home	29 March 1985	Drawn	
13	213	New Zealand	1	1	Eden Park, Auckland	Away	27 February 1987	Won	
14	141	India	1	1	Eden Gardens, Calcutta	Away	26 December 1987	Drawn	
15	103	England	1	3	Lord's, London	Away	16 June 1988	Won	
16	104	Australia	1	4	Adelaide Oval, Adelaide	Away	3 February 1989	Drawn	
17	117	India	1	2	Kensington Oval, Bridgetown	Home	7 April 1989	Won	
18	149	England	1	2	Antigua Recreation Ground, St. John's	Home	12 April 1990	Won	
19	226	Australia	1	3	Kensington Oval, Bridgetown	Home	19 April 1991	Won	

ODI centuries
No.	Score	Against	Pos.	Inn.	Venue	H/A/N	Date	Result	Ref
1	106 not out	India	1	2	Edgbaston Cricket Ground, Birmingham	Neutral	9 June 1979	Won	
2	103	New Zealand	2	1	Lancaster Park, Christchurch	Away	6 February 1980	Lost	
3	103	Pakistan	1	1	Melbourne Cricket Ground, Melbourne	Neutral	21 November 1981	Won	
4	105 not out	Zimbabwe	1	2	New Road, Worcester	Neutral	13 June 1983	Won	
5	115	India	2	1	Keenan Stadium, Jamshedpur	Away	7 December 1983	Won	
6	110 not out	Sri Lanka	1	2	Adelaide Oval, Adelaide	Neutral	26 January 1985	Won	
7	100	Australia	1	1	WACA Ground, Perth	Away	4 January 1987	Won	
8	104	New Zealand	1	2	Eden Park, Auckland	Away	21 March 1987	Won	
9	133	New Zealand	1	2	Lancaster Park, Christchurch	Away	28 March 1987	Won	
10	102 not out	Pakistan	1	2	Sharjah Cricket Association Stadium, Sharjah	Neutral	18 October 1988	Lost	
11	117	India	1	2	Antigua Recreation Ground, St. John's	Home	18 March 1989	Won	

== See also ==
- List of centuries scored on Test cricket debut

Preceded by Viv Richards	West Indies Test cricket captains 1987/88	Succeeded by Viv Richards
