= Keenan Stadium =

Cricket stadium in Jharkhand, India

Coordinates: 22°48′20.69″N 86°11′28.96″E

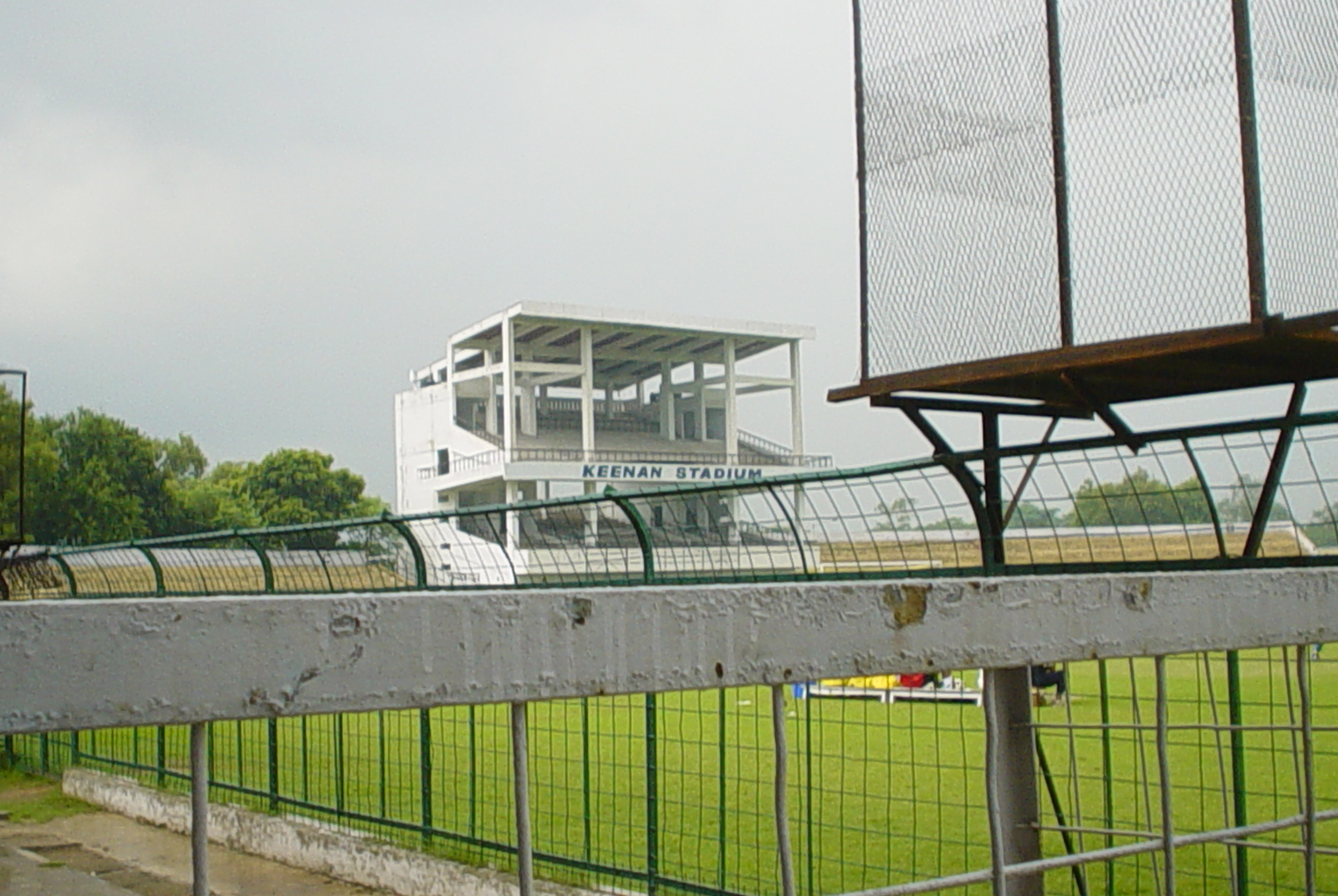
- View of Keenan Stadium

Ground information
- Location: Jamshedpur, Jharkhand, India
- Country: India
- Establishment: 1939
- Capacity: 19,000
- Owner: Tata Steel
- Operator: Jharkhand State Cricket Association
- Tenants: Indian Cricket Team; Jharkhand cricket team
- End names
- Dalma Hills End; Naoroji Pavilion End

International information
- First ODI: 7 December, 1983: India v West Indies
- Last ODI: 12 April, 2006: India v England
- Only women's Test: 24–27 November 1995: India v England
- First WODI: 1 January 1978: Australia v New Zealand
- Last WODI: 29 February 2004: India v West Indies
- As of 21 June 2014; Source: Keenan Stadium, ESPNcricinfo

Keenan Stadium, is a multi-purpose stadium and an International Cricket Stadium in Jamshedpur, India. It is currently used mostly for cricket and football matches. It is also known as a venue for archery.

The stadium is named after John Lawrence Keenan a former general manager of the Tata Steel. The stadium is situated in Northern Town area of Bistupur and is owned by Tata Steel. It has a capacity of 19,000 people.

== History ==
Since being built in 1939 the ground has hosted Ranji Trophy matches for the Bihar now Jharkhand cricket team. The venue staged its first international match in December 1983 when West Indies beat India in a One Day International.

The ground has staged a further nine One Day Internationals, of which India won but one, the most recent in April 2006 when England beat India by five wickets.

Sourav Ganguly scored a 100 to help India win its only match here. Former Indian captain MS Dhoni has played many matches for Jharkhand in this stadium. He spent much time in this stadium in his early days when JSCA stadium was not built in Ranchi, and also featured in M.S. Dhoni: The Untold Story, the biopic on Dhoni.

== Episode ==
This stadium became infamous for the crowd turning violent and throwing crackers on field during India against West Indies match in 2002/03.

== List of Centuries ==
=== Key ===
- * denotes that the batsman was not out.
- Inns. denotes the number of the innings in the match.
- Balls denotes the number of balls faced in an innings.
- NR denotes that the number of balls was not recorded.
- Parentheses next to the player's score denotes his century number at Edgbaston.
- The column title Date refers to the date the match started.
- The column title Result refers to the player's team result

=== One Day Internationals ===
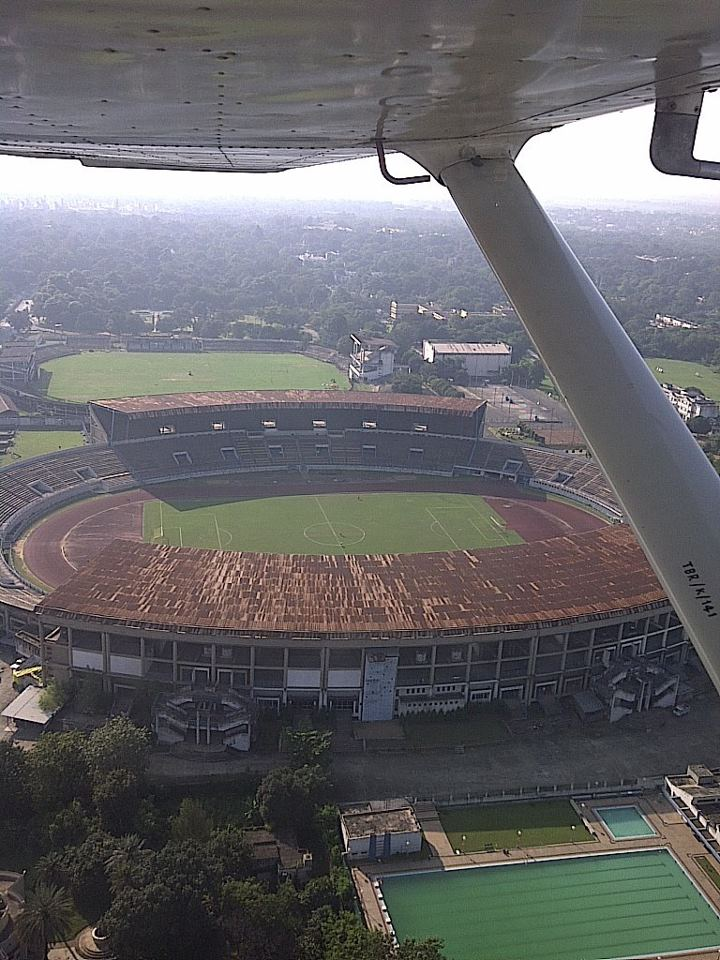
Keenan Stadium aerial view (top right)

| No. | Score | Player | Team | Balls | Inns. | Opposing team | Date | Result |
|---|---|---|---|---|---|---|---|---|
| 1 | 115 | Gordon Greenidge | West Indies | 134 | 1 | India | 7 December 1983 | Won |
| 2 | 149 | Viv Richards | West Indies | 99 | 1 | India | 7 December 1983 | Won |
| 3 | 106 | Manoj Prabhakar | India | 121 | 1 | Pakistan | 26 March 1987 | Lost |
| 4 | 107* | Martin Crowe | New Zealand | 129 | 2 | India | 15 November 1995 | Won |
| 5 | 105* | Sourav Ganguly | India | 139 | 2 | South Africa | 12 March 2000 | Won |
| 6 | 101 | Salman Butt | Pakistan | 116 | 1 | India | 9 April 2005 | Won |

== List of Five Wicket Hauls ==
=== Key ===
| Symbol | Meaning |
|---|---|
| † | The bowler was man of the match |
| ‡ | 10 or more wickets taken in the match |
| § | One of two five-wicket hauls by the bowler in the match |
| Date | Day the Test started or ODI was held |
| Inn | Innings in which five-wicket haul was taken |
| Overs | Number of overs bowled. |
| Runs | Number of runs conceded |
| Wkts | Number of wickets taken |
| Econ | Runs conceded per over |
| Batsmen | Batsmen whose wickets were taken |
| Drawn | The match was drawn. |

=== One Day Internationals ===
| No. | Bowler | Date | Team | Opposing team | Inn | Overs | Runs | Wkts | Econ | Batsmen | Result |
|---|---|---|---|---|---|---|---|---|---|---|---|
| 1 | Rana Naved-ul-Hasan | 9 April 2005 | Pakistan | India | 2 | 8.4 | 27 | 6 | 3.11 | Virender Sehwag; Sourav Ganguly; MS Dhoni; Yuvraj Singh; Irfan Pathan; Ashish Nehra | Won |
