= Pakistani cricket team in New Zealand in 2016–17 =

International cricket tour

| | New Zealand | Pakistan |
- Dates: 11 – 29 November 2016
| Captains | Kane Williamson | Misbah-ul-Haq (1st Test); Azhar Ali (2nd Test) |

Test series
- Result: New Zealand won the 2-match series 2–0
| Most runs | Ross Taylor (150) | Babar Azam (142) |
| Most wickets | Tim Southee (13) | Mohammad Amir (7) |

The Pakistani cricket team toured New Zealand in November 2016 to play two Test matches and a three-day first-class match. Christchurch and Hamilton were the venues scheduled to host the two Test matches.

The first Test of the series went ahead as planned on 17 November, despite Christchurch suffering a 7.8 magnitude earthquake, just after midnight on 14 November. However, no play was possible on the first day due to rain.

New Zealand won the series 2–0. This was New Zealand's first series win against Pakistan in Tests since 1985.

== Squads ==
| New Zealand | Pakistan |
|---|---|
| Kane Williamson (c); Todd Astle; ~~Trent Boult~~; Doug Bracewell; Colin de Grandhomme; Matt Henry; Tom Latham; ~~James Neesham~~; Henry Nicholls; Jeet Raval; Mitchell Santner; Tim Southee; Ross Taylor; Neil Wagner; BJ Watling | ~~Misbah-ul-Haq (c)~~; Azhar Ali (vc); Sarfraz Ahmed (wk); Rahat Ali; Mohammad Amir; Sami Aslam; Babar Azam; Imran Khan; Sharjeel Khan; Sohail Khan; Younis Khan; Mohammad Nawaz; Wahab Riaz; Mohammad Rizwan; Asad Shafiq; Yasir Shah |

Azhar Ali was appointed Pakistan's captain for the second Test after Misbah-ul-Haq left the tour after the death of his father-in-law. Misbah-ul-Haq was later given a one-match suspension by the International Cricket Council (ICC) for Pakistan's slow over rate in the first Test, and he would have missed the second Test because of this. Mitchell Santner replaced James Neesham in New Zealand's squad ahead of the second Test. Trent Boult was ruled out of the second Test with a knee injury and was replaced by Doug Bracewell.

== Tour match ==
=== First-class: New Zealand A vs Pakistanis ===
11–13 November 2016
Scorecard

| New Zealand A | v | Pakistanis |

No result
Saxton Oval, Nelson, New Zealand
Umpires: Chris Brown (NZ) and Wayne Knights (NZ)

- New Zealand A won the toss and elected to bat.
- No play was possible on all three days due to rain.

== Test series ==
=== 1st Test ===
17–21 November 2016
Scorecard

| Pakistan | v | New Zealand |
| 133 (55.5 overs); Misbah-ul-Haq 31 (108); Colin de Grandhomme 6/41 (15.5 overs) | | 200 (59.5 overs); Jeet Raval 55 (121); Rahat Ali 4/62 (15.5 overs) |
| 171 (78.4 overs); Sohail Khan 40 (39); Neil Wagner 3/34 (20 overs) | | 108/2 (31.3 overs); Kane Williamson 61 (77); Azhar Ali 1/6 (3 overs) |

New Zealand won by 8 wickets
Hagley Oval, Christchurch
Umpires: Ian Gould (Eng) and Sundaram Ravi (Ind)
Player of the match: Colin de Grandhomme (NZ)

- New Zealand won the toss and elected to field.
- No play was possible on day 1 due to rain.
- Colin de Grandhomme and Jeet Raval (NZ) both made their Test debuts.
- Misbah-ul-Haq became the first player to captain Pakistan in 50 Tests.
- Colin de Grandhomme became the eighth New Zealand player to take a five-wicket haul on debut and also took the best figures on debut for New Zealand in a Test.
- Neil Wagner (NZ) took his 100th Test wicket, becoming the second fastest New Zealand bowler to reach this milestone in Test cricket.

=== 2nd Test ===
25–29 November 2016
Scorecard

| New Zealand | v | Pakistan |
| 271 (83.4 overs); Jeet Raval 55 (112); Sohail Khan 4/99 (25 overs) | | 216 (67 overs); Babar Azam 90* (196); Tim Southee 6/80 (21 overs) |
| 313/5d (85.3 overs); Ross Taylor 102* (134); Imran Khan 3/76 (20.3 overs) | | 230 (92.1 overs); Sami Aslam 91 (238); Neil Wagner 3/57 (20.1 overs) |

New Zealand won by 138 runs
Seddon Park, Hamilton
Umpires: Simon Fry (Aus) and Sundaram Ravi (Ind)
Player of the match: Tim Southee (NZ)

- Pakistan won the toss and elected to field.
- Only 21 overs of play were possible on day 1 due to rain.
- Only 38.1 overs of play were possible on day 3 due to rain.
- Azhar Ali (Pak) played his first Test match as captain.
- Mohammad Rizwan (Pak) made his Test debut.
