= Thomas McCall (umpire) =

New Zealand cricket umpire

Personal information
- Born: 1951 (age 74–75); New Zealand

Umpiring information
- ODIs umpired: 2 (1985)
- WTests umpired: 1 (1992)
- Source: Cricinfo, 25 May 2014

Thomas Alexander McCall (born 1951) is a New Zealand former cricket umpire. He stood in two ODI games in 1985.

== See also ==
- List of One Day International cricket umpires
