= T. E. Srinivasan =

Indian cricketer (1950–2010)

Personal information
- Full name: Tirumalai Echambadi Srinivasan
- Born: 26 October 1950; Madras, Tamil Nadu, India
- Died: 6 December 2010 (aged 60)
- Batting: Right-handed
- Bowling: Legbreak

International information
- National side: India
- Only Test (cap 153): 13 March 1981 v New Zealand
- ODI debut (cap 33): 6 December 1980 v Australia
- Last ODI: 10 January 1981 v New Zealand

Career statistics
Competition	Test	ODI
Matches	1	2
Runs scored	48	10
Batting average	24.00	5.00
100s/50s	0/0	0/0
Top score	29	6
Catches/stumpings	0/–	0/–
- Source: CricInfo, 4 February 2006

Tirumalai Echambadi Srinivasan (26 October 1950 – 6 December 2010) was a former Indian cricketer who played in one Test match and two One Day Internationals (ODIs) from 1980 to 1981.

Srinivasan was born in Chennai. His father was famous Tamil actor T. E. Varadan. He was first noticed when he hit 112 for South Zone against North Zone in the Duleep Trophy in the 1977–78 season. A string of consistent performances, culminating in an innings of 129 in the 1980–81 Deodhar Trophy final and an unbeaten ton against Delhi in the Irani Trophy, earned him a place in the India squad for that season's tour of Australia and New Zealand. He could, however, not make an impact in his two ODIs and scored 48 runs in his only Test, in Auckland.

Srinivasan died on 6 December 2010 aged 60 after a long struggle against brain cancer. He had had two operations and was due to have a third when he died.
