= Dave Gilbert (Australian cricketer) =

Australian cricketer

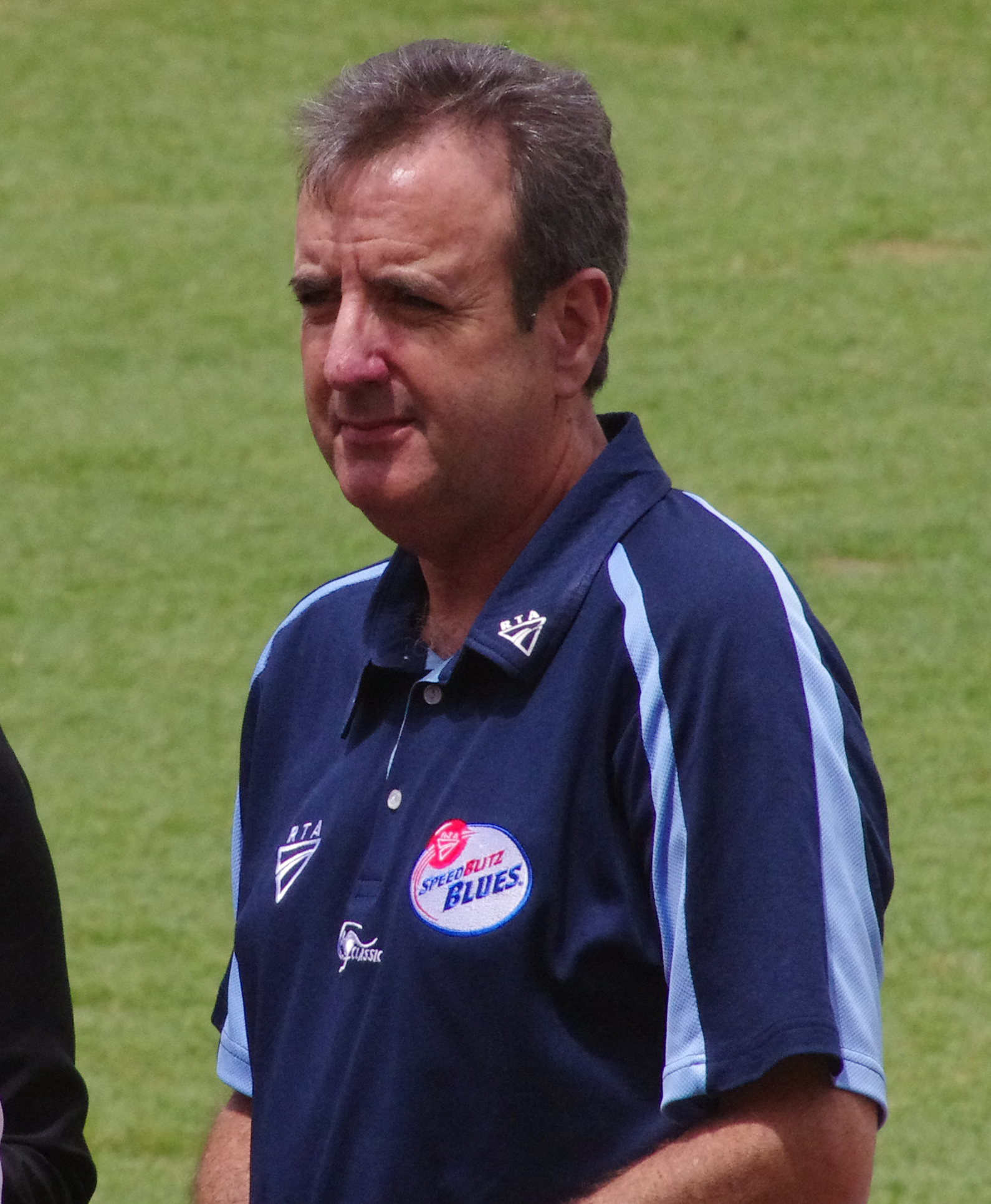

Personal information
- Full name: David Robert Gilbert
- Born: 29 December 1960 (age 65); Darlinghurst, New South Wales, Australia
- Nickname: Lizard
- Batting: Right-handed
- Bowling: Right-arm fast-medium
- Role: Bowler

International information
- National side: Australia
- Test debut (cap 330): 29 August 1985 v England
- Last Test: 15 October 1986 v India
- ODI debut (cap 88): 9 January 1986 v New Zealand
- Last ODI: 5 October 1986 v India

Domestic team information
- Years: Team
- 1983/84–1991/92: New South Wales

Career statistics
Competition	Test	ODI	FC	LA
Matches	9	14	127	62
Runs scored	57	39	1,374	166
Batting average	7.12	7.80	14.31	9.76
100s/50s	0/0	0/0	1/1	0/0
Top score	15	8	117	25
Balls bowled	1,647	684	23,295	3,201
Wickets	16	18	354	64
Bowling average	52.68	30.66	32.39	35.70
5 wickets in innings	0	1	11	1
10 wickets in match	0	0	1	0
Best bowling	3/48	5/46	8/55	5/46
Catches/stumpings	0/–	3/–	34/–	7/–
- Source: Cricinfo, 13 January 2015

David Robert Gilbert (born 29 December 1960) is a former Australian cricketer who played in nine Test matches and 14 One Day Internationals (ODIs) in 1985 and 1986. He played domestically for New South Wales, Gloucestershire and Tasmania.

Gilbert received his chance at international cricket due to player bans as a result of rebel tours to South Africa. He performed reasonably well leading the attack, but did not attain distinction at the international level. He toured England, New Zealand and India with the Australian team. He also played 14 ODIs, taking 18 wickets at 30.66. He won the match award when he took 5 for 46 off 10 overs in Australia's victory over New Zealand at the Sydney Cricket Ground in January 1986.

He achieved greater success at first-class level, taking over 350 wickets. He took his best match figures of 13 for 118 for a Young Australia XI against Zimbabwe at Harare in October 1985: 7 for 43 and 6 for 75 in the Australians' 65-run victory. His best innings figures were 8 for 55 for Gloucestershire against Kent in August 1991.

Since retiring, he has served at executive levels with Surrey, Sussex and New South Wales. He was subsequently a successful coach at Surrey, CEO for Sussex and worked as the CEO of the New South Wales Cricket Association until 14 January 2013, when he resigned.

He is currently a Match Referee for the ICC.
