= Bruce Bricknell =

New Zealand cricket umpire (1935–1982)

Personal information
- Born: 11 July 1935; Wellington, New Zealand
- Died: 16 October 1982 (aged 47); Auckland, New Zealand

Umpiring information
- Tests umpired: 1 (1982)
- ODIs umpired: 2 (1981–1982)
- WTests umpired: 1 (1975)
- WODIs umpired: 3 (1982)
- Source: Cricinfo, 1 July 2013

Bruce Bricknell (11 July 1935 – 16 October 1982) was a New Zealand cricket umpire. Besides umpiring at the first-class level, he officiated in one Test match, between New Zealand and Australia, in 1982, and two ODI games, in 1981 and 1982.

== See also ==
- List of Test cricket umpires
- List of One Day International cricket umpires
- Australian cricket team in New Zealand in 1981–82
