= Ewen Chatfield =

New Zealand cricketer

Ewen Chatfield MBE
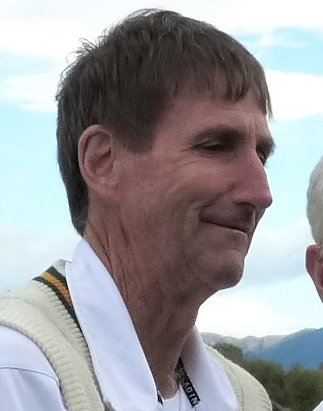
- Chatfield in 2018

Personal information
- Full name: Ewen John Chatfield
- Born: 3 July 1950 (age 76); Dannevirke, New Zealand
- Batting: Right-handed
- Bowling: Right-arm medium-fast
- Role: Bowler

International information
- National side: New Zealand (1975–1989)
- Test debut (cap 131): 20 February 1975 v England
- Last Test: 24 February 1989 v Pakistan
- ODI debut (cap 34): 16 June 1979 v West Indies
- Last ODI: 6 February 1989 v Pakistan

Domestic team information
- Years: Team
- 1973/74–1989/90: Wellington

Career statistics
Competition	Test	ODI	FC	LA
Matches	43	114	157	171
Runs scored	180	118	582	156
Batting average	8.57	10.72	9.09	10.40
100s/50s	0/0	0/0	0/0	0/0
Top score	21*	19*	24*	19*
Balls bowled	10,360	6,065	37,160	9,161
Wickets	123	140	587	222
Bowling average	32.17	25.84	22.87	23.68
5 wickets in innings	3	1	27	1
10 wickets in match	1	0	8	0
Best bowling	6/73	5/34	8/24	5/34
Catches/stumpings	7/–	19/–	51/–	22/–
- Source: Cricinfo, 18 December 2011

Ewen John Chatfield (born 3 July 1950) is a former New Zealand cricketer. A medium-pace bowler, though Chatfield played 43 Tests and 114 One Day Internationals for his country. He is also remembered for having been hit in the head by a ball while batting, causing him to collapse and need resuscitation.

With the ball his chief weapon was accuracy, giving him economic bowling figures.

== Domestic career ==
In a three-day match for Wellington in February 1980, Chatfield played a key role in defeating the West Indies, who were at the time the best cricket team in the world; he took six wickets in the first innings and seven in the second.

Chatfield also played for Hutt Valley in the Hawke Cup. In 1984 he was the first Hutt City Sportsperson of the Year.

== International career ==
With the ball, Chatfield distinguished himself with efforts against the West Indies, on tour in 1984/85 and in the home series which New Zealand drew in 1986/87. He was also a member of the New Zealand sides which achieved the country's first Test series wins against England and Australia at home and away. Chatfield spent much of his career as the bowling partner to Sir Richard Hadlee. Coincidentally, the pair share the same birthday, though Chatfield is one year Hadlee's senior.

=== Head injury ===
Chatfield is also noted for being seriously injured on the cricket field, in the First Test against England in the 1974–75 season at Eden Park, Auckland. England were at the end of a long and difficult tour in which they had been defeated in the Ashes by Australia. Chatfield, a number 11 batsman, was holding up England with a last wicket partnership with his future captain, Geoff Howarth. English fast bowler Peter Lever decided to test Chatfield with a bouncer. At the time helmets and other now common protective gear were not in use. The ball deflected from Chatfield's bat and struck him on the temple, rendering him unconscious and not breathing. The English team's physiotherapist Bernard Thomas was the first to realise what had happened: Chatfield had swallowed his tongue. Thomas flicked it back into place and managed to revive Chatfield with heart massage and mouth-to-mouth resuscitation. Lever was distraught; Chatfield later joked that when he was visited by Lever in the hospital, "he looked worse than I did". Some years later helmets were introduced into cricket and Chatfield wore one thereafter.

=== Late career ===
A classic no.11 batsman, in one of the most memorable tests in New Zealand cricket history, he accompanied Wellington teammate Jeremy Coney in a partnership to defeat Pakistan at Carisbrook, Dunedin, in the 1984/85 Test series. It was technically not a last wicket win, as Lance Cairns was still available to bat, but Cairns was severely concussed at the time and essentially incapable of batting, making Chatfield his side's last hope for a series win. Chatfield managed his highest Test score, an unbeaten 21. Such was Coney's faith in his partner that Chatfield ended up facing 84 deliveries during their stand as opposed to Coney's 48.

Wasim Akram said of Chatfield's batting: "We grew frustrated. Chatfield was one of those tailenders who play forward to everything, so we bowled short. When I hit him in the helmet, [Fred] Goodall again told us off". Chatfield said of the short-pitched bowling: "I was fair game...It was not the bowler's fault I couldn't handle his bowling".

In the 1990 New Year Honours, Chatfield was appointed a Member of the Order of the British Empire, for services to cricket.

== After cricket ==
Since retiring from first-class cricket, Chatfield has had a variety of jobs. He coached the Hutt Valley association until they merged with Wellington, worked in a chip shop, was a courier and drove a van for a dairy. He also mowed lawns and drove a taxi driver in Wellington.

In 2020, the 95-year old Basin Reserve Museum Stand was reopened and the Old Pavilion Stand therein was renamed Chatfield.
