= Rodger McHarg =

New Zealand cricket umpire

Personal information
- Full name: Rodger Lindsay McHarg
- Born: 29 March 1947 (age 79); Christchurch, New Zealand

Umpiring information
- Tests umpired: 3 (1986–1991)
- ODIs umpired: 13 (1986–1992)
- WODIs umpired: 2 (1982–1992)
- Source: Cricinfo, 12 July 2013

Rodger McHarg (born 29 March 1947) is a former New Zealand cricket umpire. He stood in three Test matches between 1986 and 1991 and 13 ODI games between 1986 and 1992.

== See also ==
- List of Test cricket umpires
- List of One Day International cricket umpires
