= Martin Crowe =

New Zealand cricketer (1962–2016)

Martin Crowe MBE
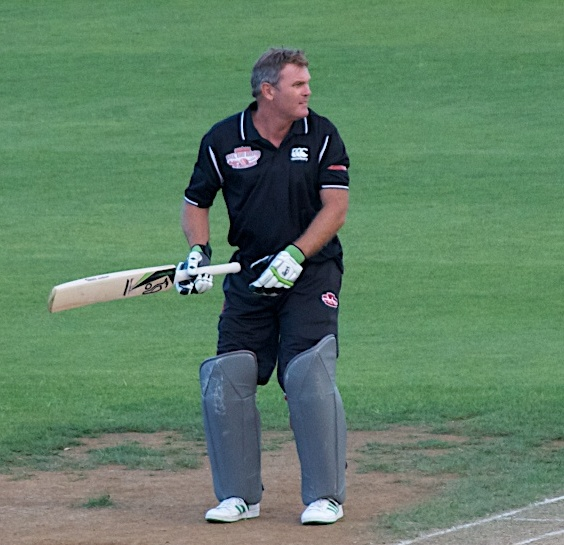
- Crowe batting in a charity game in 2011

Personal information
- Full name: Martin David Crowe
- Born: 22 September 1962; Henderson, New Zealand
- Died: 3 March 2016 (aged 53); Auckland, New Zealand
- Batting: Right-handed
- Bowling: Right-arm medium
- Role: Middle-order batsman
- Relatives: Lorraine Downes (wife); Dave Crowe (father); Jeff Crowe (brother); Russell Crowe (cousin); Francis Jervis (great-grandfather)

International information
- National side: New Zealand (1982–1995)
- Test debut (cap 150): 26 February 1982 v Australia
- Last Test: 12 November 1995 v India
- ODI debut (cap 40): 13 February 1982 v Australia
- Last ODI: 26 November 1995 v India

Domestic team information
- Years: Team
- 1979/80–1982/83: Auckland
- 1983/84–1989/90: Central Districts
- 1984–1988: Somerset
- 1990/91–1994/95: Wellington

Career statistics
Competition	Test	ODI	FC	LA
Matches	77	143	247	261
Runs scored	5,444	4,704	19,608	8,740
Batting average	45.36	38.55	56.02	38.16
100s/50s	17/18	4/34	71/80	11/59
Top score	299	107*	299	155*
Balls bowled	1,377	1,296	7,921	3,994
Wickets	14	29	119	99
Bowling average	48.28	32.89	33.69	28.87
5 wickets in innings	0	0	4	0
10 wickets in match	0	0	0	0
Best bowling	2/25	2/9	5/18	4/24
Catches/stumpings	71/–	66/–	226/–	115/–
- Source: ESPNcricinfo, 30 May 2009

Martin David Crowe MBE (22 September 1962 – 3 March 2016) was a New Zealand cricketer, Test and ODI captain as well as a commentator. He played for the New Zealand national cricket team between 1982 and 1995, and is regarded as one of the country's greatest batsmen.

Crowe made his first-class debut for Auckland aged of 17, and his Test debut for New Zealand aged 19. He was named a Wisden Cricketer of the Year in 1985, and was credited as one of the "best young batsmen in the world". Crowe was appointed New Zealand's captain in 1990, and led the team until 1993. In a Test against Sri Lanka in 1991, he scored 299 runs, breaking the record for the highest score by a New Zealander. In the same match, he also set a new record for the highest partnership in Test cricket, putting on 467 runs with Andrew Jones. At the 1992 World Cup, which New Zealand co-hosted with Australia, Crowe was named the player of the tournament, and led his team to a semi-final. By the time he finished his international career in 1995, he held the records for the most Test and One Day International (ODI) runs scored for New Zealand.

After retiring from playing, Crowe remained involved in cricket as a writer and commentator. He was diagnosed with lymphoma in 2012, but was declared cancer-free the following year. However, the disease returned in 2014, and eventually led to his death in 2016. He was also one of the drivers behind the ICC World Test Championship concept which was initially proposed in 2009, but did not eventuate until 2019.

== Early life ==
Crowe was born in Henderson, a suburb of Auckland, to a family of cricketers. His father, Dave Crowe, played first-class cricket for Canterbury and Wellington and his older brother, Jeff Crowe, played Test cricket. He was also the great-grandson of All Black Francis Jervis (his mother's maternal grandfather). One of the brothers' first cousins is actor Russell Crowe. In 1968, Martin Crowe joined his father and brother at the Cornwall Cricket Club, with which he maintained a lifelong connection. At Auckland Grammar School, which he attended from 1976 to 1980, he was deputy head boy in his final year. He captained the school's cricket team, and also played rugby union, as a wing.

== Domestic career ==
Crowe made his first-class debut in January 1980, playing for Auckland against Canterbury. Aged 17 at the time, he scored 51 runs in his first innings, which was his team's highest score. In 1981, having been named New Zealand's Young Cricketer of the Year, Crowe was given the opportunity to spend six months on the ground staff of Lord's, simultaneously playing for the Marylebone Cricket Club. Returning to New Zealand for the 1981–82 domestic season, he scored a maiden first-class century, making 150 runs against Canterbury. Crowe switched to Central Districts after the 1982–83 season. His career for Central Districts was limited by his international duties, but in 32 first-class appearances (from 1983 to 1990), he averaged 68.72, with 13 centuries. Crowe's highest score for the team (and in all New Zealand domestic cricket) was 242, made against Otago in January 1990. That season was his last for Central Districts, as he transferred to Wellington prior to the 1990–91 season. In five seasons for Wellington, Crowe made only nine first-class appearances, the last of which came during the 1994–95 season.

In 1984, Crowe signed to play English county cricket with Somerset. He had great success in his first County Championship season, finishing second behind Vic Marks in Somerset's averages and placing sixth for overall runs scored. However, Crowe did not return to the county until the 1987 season. In that year's County Championship, he placed third in the overall averages (behind teammate Steve Waugh and Northamptonshire's Roger Harper), and also placed third for overall runs scored (behind Graeme Hick and Graeme Fowler). Against Hampshire in the 1987 Benson & Hedges Cup (a limited-overs competition), he scored 155 not out from 119 balls, which was the highest one-day score of his career. Crowe returned for a final season at Somerset in 1988, but was able to play only a handful of matches. From 48 matches for Somerset, he finished with a first-class batting average of 59.46.

== International career ==
=== Early years ===
Crowe made his international debut for New Zealand in February 1982, in a One Day International (ODI) game against Australia played at Auckland's Eden Park. He made his Test debut at the end of the month, playing against the same team at Wellington's Basin Reserve. At the time, only six New Zealanders had made their Test debuts at a younger age. At the 1983 World Cup in England, Crowe played in all six of his team's matches, with only Geoff Howarth scoring more runs. His highest score was 97, made in the opening game against England. In January 1984, when England toured, Crowe scored his first Test century – 100 runs exactly.

In 1985, Crowe made two scores of 188. The first came on a mid-year tour of the West Indies, with Crowe at the crease for 462 balls and over nine hours. The second came in an end-of-year tour of Australia, in a match that was better known for Richard Hadlee's 15-wicket haul. In a Test against the West Indies in February 1987, Crowe and John Wright put on 241 runs for the third wicket, setting a new third-wicket record for New Zealand. Later in the year, Crowe played in the 1987 World Cup in India. He finished as New Zealand's leading run-scorer, making three half-centuries from six matches, although his team struggled (winning only against Zimbabwe).

=== Captaincy and 1992 World Cup ===
Crowe was first appointed captain of New Zealand for a tour of Pakistan in October and November 1990. Before that point, he had been regarded as "captain designate" to John Wright, who was nearing the end of his international career. Crowe's second series as captain came in early 1991, when Sri Lanka toured. In the first Test of the series, played in Wellington, Crowe scored 299 runs in his team's second innings, setting a new record for the highest score by a New Zealander. (Note: Crowe was only the second player to score 299 in a Test, after Don Bradman, who scored 299 not out for Australia against South Africa in 1932.) (Note: Crowe's New Zealand record was broken in February 2014, when Brendon McCullum scored 302 against India.) He was at the crease for 523 balls and over ten hours, and scored 29 fours and three sixes. Crowe and Andrew Jones (who scored 186) put on 467 runs for the third wicket, setting a new record for the highest partnership in Test cricket. (Note: Crowe and Jones's overall record was broken in August 1997, when Sanath Jayasuriya and Roshan Mahanama put on 576 runs for Sri Lanka against India. Their third-wicket record was broken in July 2006, when Kumar Sangakkara and Mahela Jayawardene put on 624 runs for Sri Lanka against South Africa (also setting a new overall record).) The pair helped New Zealand, behind by 323 runs on the first innings, to score 671/4 at the end of the final day's play, which at the time was the highest score in the third innings of a Test.

At the 1992 World Cup, which New Zealand co-hosted with Australia, Crowe finished as the tournament's leading run-scorer with 456 runs, and was named player of the tournament. One of his highlights was an innings of 100 not out in the opening match against Australia, which New Zealand won by 37 runs. In the tournament's group stages, New Zealand lost only a single game, against Pakistan. They topped the table, qualifying for a home semi-final against the same team (their first finals appearance since the 1979 tournament). Crowe chose to bat first, and scored 91 runs from 83 balls to help his team to a total of 262/7. However, when Pakistan batted, he chose to stay off the field and rest an injured hamstring, with John Wright taking over on the field. Pakistan won the match by four wickets. Crowe largely blamed himself for his team's loss, and in a 2014 article said that his decision not to take the field was "a curse that had tormented me for over two decades".

Crowe's last series as captain of New Zealand came when Australia toured in February and March 1993. He had struggled with injuries for several years, and was replaced by Ken Rutherford to allow him to concentrate on his form. However, he returned as captain for one final match in November 1993, the first game of a series against Australia. In total, Crowe captained New Zealand in sixteen Tests, winning only two. He had a much better record in ODIs, with the team winning 21 out of 44 matches under his captaincy. Crowe was described by broadcaster Bryan Waddle as a "proactive rather than reactive" leader, who was "always prepared to be innovative". He had a troubled relationship with the media throughout his captaincy, in one case using a press conference to confront a journalist who had published an article implying he had AIDS.

=== Later years ===
In his first series after giving up the captaincy, a 1994 tour of England, Crowe scored consecutive centuries, making 142 at Lord's and 115 at Old Trafford. His series tally of 380 runs was the second-highest of his career. Crowe continued playing for several more seasons, eventually retiring after a tour of India in October and November 1995. He scored his final international hundred in the first ODI of the tour, aged 33. Crowe finished with 5,444 Test runs and 4,704 ODI runs, both New Zealand records at the time. At the time of his retirement, only Sir Richard Hadlee had played more Tests for New Zealand. Crowe held the record for the most Test centuries by a New Zealander at the time, finishing with seventeen (including one against every Test-playing team but South Africa).

In the 1992 New Year Honours, Crowe was appointed a Member of the Order of the British Empire, for services to cricket. On 28 February 2015, Crowe was inducted into the ICC Cricket Hall of Fame. He was inducted in a ceremony during the lunch break of New Zealand's win against Australia during the 2015 World Cup.

=== International centuries ===
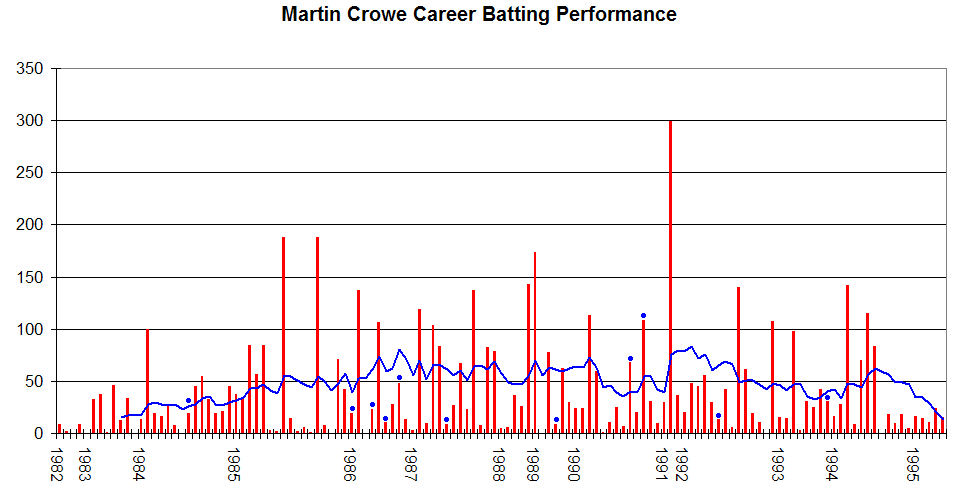
Martin Crowe's Test performance graph

Crowe made 21 centuries in international cricket, 17 in Tests and 4 in One Day Internationals. He scored his first Test century against England, also at the Basin Reserve on 20 January 1984, scoring 100. He scored his final Test century, also against England at Old Trafford, Manchester on 30 June 1994, scoring 115. He played his final Test match against India at the Barabati Stadium, Cuttack on 8 November 1995, having played 77 matches. His highest score in Tests is 299, scored against Sri Lanka at the Basin Reserve on 31 January 1991.

He scored his first ODI century against England, also at Eden Park, scoring 105 not out. He scored his final ODI century against India at the Keenan Stadium, Jamshedpur on 15 November 1995, scoring 107 not out, his highest score in ODIs. He played his final ODI in the final game of the same series against India at the Vidarbha Cricket Association Ground, Nagpur on 26 November 1995, having played 143 matches.

Test centuries
No.	Score	Opponent	Venue	Date	Ref
1	100	England	Basin Reserve, Wellington	20 January 1984	
2	188	West Indies	Bourda, Georgetown	6 April 1985	
3	188	Australia	The Gabba, Brisbane	8 November 1985	
4	137	Australia	Lancaster Park, Christchurch	28 February 1986	
5	106	England	Lord's, London	24 July 1986	
6	119	West Indies	Basin Reserve, Wellington	20 February 1987	
7	104	West Indies	Eden Park, Auckland	27 February 1987	
8	137	Australia	Adelaide Oval	11 December 1987	
9	143	England	Basin Reserve, Wellington	3 March 1988	
10	174	Pakistan	Basin Reserve, Wellington	10 February 1989	
11	113	India	Eden Park, Auckland	22 February 1990	
12	108 not out	Pakistan	Gaddafi Stadium, Lahore	18 October 1990	
13	299	Sri Lanka	Basin Reserve, Wellington	31 January 1991	
14	140	Zimbabwe	Harare Sports Club	7 November 1992	
15	107	Sri Lanka	Sinhalese Sports Club, Colombo	6 December 1992	
16	142	England	Lord's, London	16 June 1994	
17	115	England	Old Trafford, Manchester	30 June 1994	

One Day International centuries
No.	Score	Opponent	Venue	Date	Ref
1	105 not out	England	Eden Park, Auckland	25 February 1984	
2	104	India	Carisbrook, Dunedin	1 March 1990	
3	100 not out	Australia	Eden Park, Auckland	22 February 1992	
4	107 not out	India	Keenan Stadium, Jamshedpur	15 November 1995	

== Later life ==
=== Coaching ===
After his retirement, Crowe helped develop a local variation of cricket, called "Cricket Max", and became a television commentator and pundit. He was a board member of the South Sydney Rabbitohs Rugby League Football Club of which Russell Crowe is part owner. He was roped in as the CEO of the management team of Royal Challengers Bangalore, a team in the Indian Premier League. Midway through the season the owner Vijay Mallya expressed displeasure over the team and its performance in the league by sacking its bowling coach Venkatesh Prasad and mentor Charu Sharma blaming them for dismal team performance. Later in October of the same year, Crowe parted ways with the team and brought in Ray Jennings, the former coach of the South African National Cricket Team as the head coach of the team. Sources suggested that Mallya was unhappy with the team he had and held Crowe and his management team responsible for the debacle. He has also mentored current New Zealand batsmen, Martin Guptill, Ross Taylor and Kane Williamson. In 2014, he predicted and named Kane Williamson, Virat Kohli, Steve Smith and Joe Root in the young Fab Four list for test cricket.

=== Attempted comeback ===
On 19 May 2011, Crowe commented on Twitter that he wanted to improve his fitness by setting a goal to play first-class cricket again. He cited that he was only 3 first-class matches away from 250 matches, and 392 runs short of 20,000 runs.

Crowe took his first step to playing first-class cricket by playing at club level at the age of 49 (he was due to debut much earlier, but was delayed due to a groin injury). He played for the Cornwall reserve grade team, captaining them and batting at No.3 against Papatoetoe in a second-division club match in Auckland, the same club where his father played grade cricket.

=== Illness and death ===
On 15 October 2012, it was revealed that Crowe had been diagnosed with lymphoma. He blamed the illness on a failing immune system, which had been weakened by various illnesses during certain tours, including salmonella poisoning in Sri Lanka in 1984.

On 5 June 2013, Crowe announced that he was free of cancer on Campbell Live, but he would cut his ties with cricket, as he was a self-proclaimed "recovering addict to cricket, much like an alcoholic". Crowe says he wore a 'mask' from the age of 22, due to high expectations, but at the age of 51 was happy to 'look at the real me'.

In 2014, Crowe announced that the lymphoma had returned and subsequently indicated that his chances of survival beyond 12 months were less than 5% and also of his wish to see the 2015 Cricket World Cup in February and March 2015. He also attended the 2015 Cricket World Cup Final between Australia and New Zealand at the Melbourne Cricket Ground which in fact was his last public appearance.

Crowe died of complications from the disease in Auckland on 3 March 2016. His funeral was held in Holy Trinity Cathedral in a Christian ceremony in Parnell, Auckland.

== Personal life ==
In 1991, Crowe married Simone Curtice, an interior designer. They separated five years later, in 1996, and Crowe later entered into a relationship with Suzanne Taylor, with whom he had one daughter. He and Taylor separated in 2005. In 2009, Crowe married for a third time, to Lorraine Downes, a former Miss Universe. They remained married until his death.

== Playing style ==
=== Batting ===
A 2012 article by Mark Nicholas described him as "upright, orthodox and immensely strong" at the wicket, and praised the "speed and grace of the footwork" and "perfect head position". Nicholas thought the elegance of Crowe's batting was at odds with his physical size – he was "a big man in a small man's game". Writing in his retirement, Crowe emphasised the importance of instinct in batting, and the need to avoid premeditating a shot.

=== Captaincy and all-round skills ===
During his early career, Crowe was also often used as a "bits and pieces bowler", with his "lively in-swingers" faring especially well in English conditions. He was regarded as an "outstanding" fieldsman, and against Zimbabwe in the 1987 World Cup dismissed David Houghton with an outstretched diving catch that was said to have won New Zealand the game. As a captain, Crowe was known for his use of innovative techniques, most notably opening the bowling with a spinner, Dipak Patel, at the 1992 World Cup. He often had highly developed bowling and fielding plans, regularly rotating his bowlers and changing his fields to put pressure on opposing batsmen. Former Pakistan captain Rameez Raja described Crowe as "an imaginative leader who maximised his team's potential and resources by thoughtful captaincy and out-of-the-box tactics". Crowe was inducted into the ICC Hall of Fame in 2015 and the NZC Hall of Fame in 2024 as one of the First XI.

== Legacy ==
Upon his death, Crowe was eulogised in The Guardian as "not just one of New Zealand’s greatest ever cricketers, but one of the most elegant batsmen the world has yet seen". In their tributes following his death, former Pakistan international Wasim Akram called him the best batsman he ever bowled to, former Australia fast bowler Craig McDermott compared him to Greg Chappell, calling him "a beautiful, elegant batsman and a terrific stroke player", while former India international Sanjay Manjrekar called him his favourite batsman and wrote that "Sachin & me actually copied him."

== Notes ==
Awards
Preceded by Peter Blake	New Zealand's Sportsman of the Year; 1991	Succeeded by Danyon Loader
Preceded by --	World Cup Player of the Series; 1992	Succeeded by Sanath Jayasuriya
Sporting positions
Preceded by John Wright	New Zealand national cricket captain 1990/1–1992/3	Succeeded by Ken Rutherford
