= Bruce Edgar =

New Zealand cricketer

Personal information
- Full name: Bruce Adrian Edgar
- Born: 23 November 1956 (age 69); Wellington, New Zealand
- Nickname: Bootsy
- Batting: Left-handed
- Role: Wicketkeeper

International information
- National side: New Zealand (1978–1986)
- Test debut (cap 143): 27 July 1978 v England
- Last Test: 21 August 1986 v England
- ODI debut (cap 30): 17 July 1978 v England
- Last ODI: 18 July 1986 v England

Domestic team information
- Years: Team
- 1976/77–1989/90: Wellington

Career statistics
Competition	Test	ODI	FC	LA
Matches	39	64	175	119
Runs scored	1,958	1,814	11,304	3,893
Batting average	30.59	30.74	40.22	37.79
100s/50s	3/12	1/10	24/61	4/22
Top score	161	102*	203	147*
Balls bowled	18	12	164	18
Wickets	0	0	2	0
Bowling average	–	–	46.99	–
5 wickets in innings	–	–	0	–
10 wickets in match	–	–	0	–
Best bowling	–	–	1/0	–
Catches/stumpings	14/–	12/–	94/1	31/0
- Source: Cricinfo, 16 December 2017

Bruce Adrian Edgar (born 23 November 1956) is a former cricketer who represented New Zealand in both Test and One Day International (ODI) formats. A chartered accountant by profession, Edgar played as a left-handed opening batsman and an occasional wicketkeeper during one of New Zealand's most successful eras in international cricket. He gained respect across the cricket world for his courage against the fastest bowlers of his era (which included greats like Imran Khan, Michael Holding, Bob Willis and Dennis Lillee), his classically straight batting technique, and his outstanding teamwork.

In 1981, Edgar became the first cricketer to be unbeaten on 99 in an ODI innings.

== Early life and playing career ==
Edgar was born and raised in Wellington, New Zealand. His father, Arthur, had represented Wellington in a few first-class matches. He was educated at Rongotai College, where he attracted attention for his brilliant batting, but would later curb his attacking instincts for the sake of the team when opening for both Wellington and later New Zealand.

In internationals, he formed a successful opening partnership with fellow left-hander John Wright.

Edgar was at the non-striker's end during the infamous underarm bowling incident which occurred on 1 February 1981 during the third World Series Cup final between New Zealand and Australia at the MCG. His striking partner, Brian McKechnie, needed a six to tie the match from the final ball. Australian bowler Trevor Chappell, on orders from the team captain and older brother Greg Chappell, bowled the ball underarm, rolling it on the ground to prevent McKechnie from getting the six and winning the match for Australia, with McKechnie hurling his bat away in disgust and Edgar aiming a V-sign towards Trevor Chappell.

The unfortunate part of the incident was that, at the time, Edgar was 102 not-out for the innings, his only one-day international century and highest score. It is often considered "the most overlooked century of all time."

The following season, some consolation for Edgar is the fact that his highest test score, 161, was against Greg Chappell's Australians at Eden Park, Auckland. New Zealand won this Test match, only their second against Australia, by five wickets and took a 1–0 lead in the three-test series, with Edgar named Man of the Match. The series was drawn 1–1, after Australia won the final test by eight wickets at Lancaster Park, Christchurch. Edgar topped the Kiwi batting averages with 278 runs at 55.60.

== Life after playing career ==
In 1981, Bruce Edgar was professional for the Hyde team which won the Central Lancashire League championship. He was later involved with the Gordon Grade Cricket Club in Sydney. He coached the A.W. Greenshield team in the 2010–11 season.

In August 2013, Edgar returned to his homeland to take up the part-time position of General Manager national selection with New Zealand Cricket. His main role would be to coordinate a selection panel that would report to head coach Mike Hesson. Edgar resigned from his position in May 2015. While reduced work and pay, as well as lack of support from the board were key reasons, Edgar also mentioned the less-than-hospitable experiences at the 2015 Cricket World Cup, including having to sit with the wives and girlfriends of the Australian players during the final, a situation he described as "awkward". The following month, Edgar was appointed Head Coach of Wellington on a three-year contract, replacing Jamie Siddons.

Edgar has worked in financial services since his retirement from international cricket. As of 2024 he is a director at Booster Financial Services. He also chairs the Cricketers' Retirement Fund and the New Zealand Rugby Players Savings Scheme.

== Bibliography ==
- Brittenden, Dick and Cameron, Don (1982). Test Series '82: The Australian Cricket Tour of New Zealand, A H and A W Reed, ISBN 0-589-014544
