= David Kinsella =

New Zealand cricket umpire (1937–2026)

Personal information
- Full name: David Arthur Kinsella
- Born: 23 February 1937; New Plymouth, New Zealand
- Died: 16 June 2026 (aged 89); Wellington, New Zealand
- Batting: Right-handed
- Bowling: Right-arm fast-medium
- Role: Bowler; umpire
- Relatives: Penny Kinsella (daughter)

Domestic team information
- Years: Team
- 1961–62–1965–66: Central Districts

Umpiring information
- Tests umpired: 3 (1981–1983)
- ODIs umpired: 6 (1982–1985)
- WODIs umpired: 1 (1982)

Career statistics
Competition	First-class
Matches	28
Runs scored	152
Batting average	6.60
100s/50s	0/0
Top score	25
Balls bowled	5,224
Wickets	72
Bowling average	23.72
5 wickets in innings	3
10 wickets in match	0
Best bowling	6/25
Catches/stumpings	12/–
- Source: Cricinfo, 29 June 2026

David Arthur Kinsella (23 February 1937 – 16 June 2026) was a New Zealand cricket umpire. At the international level, he stood in three Test matches between 1981 and 1983 and six ODI games between 1982 and 1985. He also played for Central Districts in the Plunket Shield, and Taranaki in the Hawke Cup. He was the father of Penny Kinsella.

Kinsella died in Wellington on 16 June 2026, at the age of 89.

== See also ==
- List of Test cricket umpires
- List of One Day International cricket umpires
