= Lance Cairns =

New Zealand cricketer

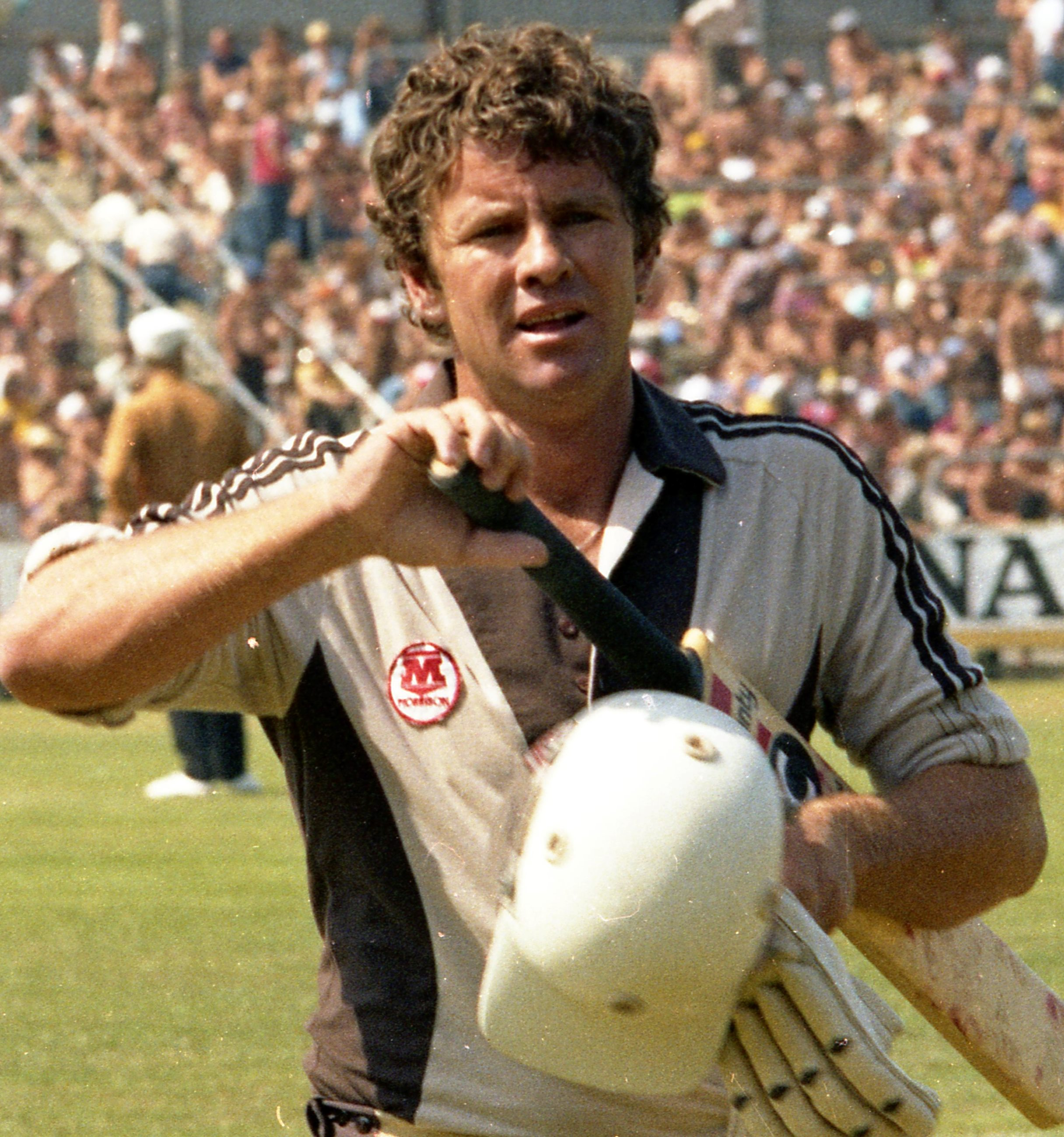

Personal information
- Full name: Bernard Lance Cairns
- Born: 10 October 1949 (age 77); Picton, New Zealand
- Batting: Right-handed
- Bowling: Right-arm medium-fast

International information
- National side: New Zealand (1974–1985)
- Test debut (cap 130): 26 January 1974 v Australia
- Last Test: 30 November 1985 v Australia
- ODI debut (cap 15): 30 March 1974 v Australia
- Last ODI: 23 April 1985 v West Indies

Domestic team information
- Years: Team
- 1972/73–1975/76: Central Districts
- 1976/77–1979/80: Otago
- 1979–1988: Durham
- 1981/82–1987/88: Northern Districts

Career statistics
Competition	Test	ODI	FC	LA
Matches	43	78	148	130
Runs scored	928	987	4,165	1,885
Batting average	16.28	16.72	20.72	18.12
100s/50s	0/2	0/2	1/23	0/9
Top score	64	60	110	95
Balls bowled	10,628	4,015	31,722	4,384
Wickets	130	89	473	167
Bowling average	32.92	30.52	26.52	26.25
5 wickets in innings	6	1	24	1
10 wickets in match	1	0	5	0
Best bowling	7/74	5/28	8/46	5/28
Catches/stumpings	30/–	19/–	89/–	37/–
- Source: Cricinfo, 4 April 2017

Bernard Lance Cairns (born 10 October 1949) is a New Zealand former cricketer who played as an all-rounder for New Zealand from 1974 to 1985. He is the father of New Zealand cricketer Chris Cairns.

He was also known for the unusual bat he played with throughout much of his career. Known as "Excalibur", the shoulders of the bat were planed down to form a conical rather than rectangular shape.

Cairns was a swing bowler with an unorthodox 'front on' action. He took 130 Test Match wickets and 89 ODI wickets. He took ten wickets in New Zealand's first ever win on English soil, at Headingley in 1983.

== Domestic career ==
In a domestic match, for Otago v Wellington, he hit 110, his only first-class century, in 51 balls hitting 9 sixes in an hour. He scored 928 Test Match and 987 ODI runs at more than a run a ball.

== International career ==
He was a member of both the one-day and Test New Zealand teams between 1974 and 1985. He also appeared for Central Districts, Northern Districts and Otago in New Zealand domestic cricket. He was also the professional for Bishop Auckland in the North Yorkshire and South Durham League in the North East of England.

=== Record hitting ===
New Zealand were favourites coming into the finals of the World Series Cup, a tournament heavily hyped as a chance for New Zealand to gain 'revenge' after the 'underarm' incident in 1980/81. The 1982/83 series saw New Zealand achieve an impressive run of victories in the ten match qualifying round with Australia and England. This included three consecutive wins over Australia and a famous match in Adelaide, where two world records were broken on the same day. New Zealand scored a world record 297–6, in beating England's 296–5.

Cairns set the scene for a dramatic run chase with 49 off 24 balls, which included three sixes off the English spinners. However, it took a match-winning seventh-wicket partnership of 121 by Jeremy Coney (47 not out) and 'Man of the Match' Richard Hadlee (79), to bring New Zealand home for an 'impossible' victory, watched by nearly 1.5 million Kiwis on television, almost half the population and a record for a sporting telecast at the time.

After a rain-affected First Final in Sydney, New Zealand went to the MCG one-nil down in the best of three finals series. Without the injured Hadlee (who missed both Finals), New Zealand had collapsed, beaten and demoralised, at 44–6, chasing Australia's score of 302–8. Dennis Lillee, who had just waved off New Zealand's last recognised batsman, awaited the arrival of Cairns.

Lillee's first ball was a bouncer that hit Cairns on the head. The batsman's response was to hit two sixes in three balls off Ken MacLeay, before hitting two consecutive sixes off Rodney Hogg, and in the next over, doing the same to Lillee. The highlight was undoubtedly a one-handed shot off Lillee, which soared over the fine leg fence. Cairns' dismissal was an anti-climax; out for 52, offering a simple catch to Steve Smith at cover off the bowling of Geoff Lawson.

"He backs off again and thrashes that one! And that's cleared Graeme Wood's head at mid-off! That's the sixth one! That must be an incredible bat he's got! It must be made of extremely good English willow."

"Very heavy English willow ! And there goes Excalibur into action again! Straight over the top of long-off, one of the most difficult shots in the book and umpire Tony Crafter's arms are growing heavy, he's been putting them above his head so often he's getting tired!"

- TCN Nine commentators Ian Chappell and Frank Tyson, 13 February 1983.

New Zealand eventually lost the match by 149 runs, and the Finals series 2–0, to an Australian team that had been markedly inferior in the preceding qualifying stages of the competition.

Despite Cairns' heroics (he also hit a spectacular six over cover off Lawson in the First Final at the SCG) Richard Hadlee's absence from both finals was probably the reason for New Zealand's 'shattered dream'.

Nevertheless, the New Zealand team, and Cairns in particular, received unprecedented adulation when they returned home for a three-match series against England, who had lost the Ashes 2-1 and had failed to make the WSC Finals in their recently completed Australian tour. England were desperate to salvage something from their tour down under and 'The Rothmans Cup' was the last prize on offer.

New Zealand whitewashed England, winning in Auckland, Wellington and Christchurch.

In the 1983/84 home series against England Cairns took his best test figures of 7-143 off 45 overs in the first test at the Basin Reserve, Wellington. After New Zealand's modest first innings total of 219, Cairns took the first five English wickets with only 115 on the board, which put the home side in a strong position on day two. However, a spectacular sixth wicket, 232 run, partnership between Ian Botham (138) and Derek Randall (164) put the visitors in command on day three with New Zealand facing a tough battle over the remaining two days to save the test.

At 402–8, only 158 runs ahead of England early on day five, defeat for New Zealand seemed likely when Cairns joined Jeremy Coney (174*) at the wicket. In perhaps Cairns' finest test innings, (64), he shared a record ninth wicket partnership of 118 with Coney who went on to score his long-awaited, maiden test century. Cairns, although hitting 10 fours and a six, played a rearguard innings best remembered for its uncharacteristic grit and controlled determination, which helped New Zealand achieve a famous draw against the odds.

The New Zealand total of 537 was a record against England and it set the foundation for an emphatic second test win by an innings and 132 runs at Lancaster Park, Christchurch, where the visitors failed to reach 100 in either innings. After a drawn third test at Eden Park, Auckland, New Zealand achieved its first test series win over England.

=== Injury and playing ===
Cairns experienced a serious injury when he came out to bat without a helmet against Pakistan in the Third Test in Dunedin in 1984/85. He received a blow to the back of the head from 19-year-old paceman Wasim Akram. After retiring hurt, Cairns was hospitalised with a suspected hairline fracture of the skull and complained of 'dizzy spells' for months afterwards. In testament to his courage, Cairns was 'padded up', this time with a helmet, ready to return to the crease, as New Zealand fought another famous rearguard action to win the test and series. History showed he was not required as Jeremy Coney (111*), this time supported by number eleven Ewen Chatfield (21*), took New Zealand to victory by two wickets.

Cairns recovered to play in the World Championship of Cricket in Sydney and Melbourne in February 1985. A highlight for Cairns was his fine innings against eventual champions India in the semi-final at the SCG (39 out of a total of 206, but with no sixes). In March he left for his last major tour as a frontline player for New Zealand, a harrowing trip to the West Indies where New Zealand lost heavily against the often brutal fast bowling of the homeside. Cairns played in only the first two tests of the four test series taking only five wickets at an average of 63.00. At aged 36 his decline as an international player seemed inevitable.

=== Later career ===
Cairns played only in the deciding third test in Perth during the 1985/86 test series. Cairns failed to take a wicket, or score a run, in his final international game. New Zealand went on to win by six wickets to take the series 2–1.

He was left out of the New Zealand World Series Cup squad which returned to Australia in January 1986. This unpopular decision, albeit inevitable due to injury and loss of form, spelled the end of his international career. Like long-standing captain Geoff Howarth at the beginning of the summer, Cairns was forced into retirement.

== Personal life ==
Cairns has suffered from deteriorating hearing since he was 17, which he blamed on working in noisy conditions. In December 2009 he was fitted with a cochlear implant. He is the Ambassador for The National Foundation for the Deaf Inc and participates in raising awareness for the Deaf and Hard of Hearing communities.

Cairns was the subject of an episode of the TVNZ production This Is Your Life in 1998 which was presented by Paul Holmes.

Following his retirement from cricket, Cairns concentrated on his golf skills and became a low-handicap golfer known for his extremely long drives. After relocating to Gisborne, he met and later married Carol Edwards, who died in 2008 from cancer. He represented Poverty Bay-East Coast at New Zealand Masters tournaments.
