= Brian Aldridge (umpire) =

New Zealand cricketer and cricket umpire (1940–2021)

Brian Aldridge QSM
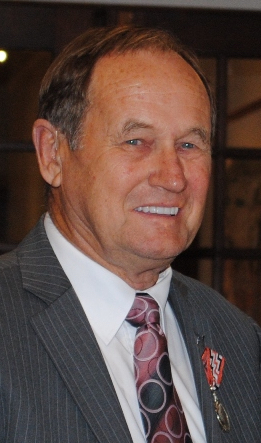
- Aldridge in 2012

Personal information
- Full name: Brian Leslie Aldridge
- Born: 30 June 1940; Christchurch, New Zealand
- Died: 9 December 2021 (aged 81); Christchurch, New Zealand

Umpiring information
- Tests umpired: 26 (1986–1995)
- ODIs umpired: 45 (1986–1995)
- WODIs umpired: 3 (1982)
- Source: Cricinfo, 17 October 2014

Brian Leslie Aldridge QSM (30 June 1940 – 9 December 2021) was a New Zealand cricket umpire.

Aldridge was one of the umpires in the 1992 Cricket World Cup final between England and Pakistan. At the time of his death, he was still the only New Zealander to have officiated in a World Cup final. He stood in 26 Test matches and 45 ODI games between 1986 and 1995. As well as 20 Tests in New Zealand, he umpired in three Tests in Sri Lanka, two in Pakistan and one in Zimbabwe. In all, he umpired 84 first-class matches between 1979 and 1995.

In 1997, Aldridge became New Zealand Cricket's first-ever full-time umpire manager, a post he held until his retirement in 2008. He was awarded the Queen's Service Medal in the 2012 New Year Honours, for services to cricket administration. Outside cricket, he worked as a builder.

Aldridge died in Christchurch on 9 December 2021, at the age of 81.

== See also ==
- List of Test cricket umpires
- List of One Day International cricket umpires
