= George Morris (umpire) =

New Zealand cricket umpire

Personal information
- Full name: George Clement Morris
- Born: 29 August 1957 (age 69); Dunedin, New Zealand

Umpiring information
- Tests umpired: 4 (1985–1987)
- ODIs umpired: 8 (1984–1988)
- WTests umpired: 1 (1977)
- WODIs umpired: 2 (1982)
- Source: Cricinfo, 13 July 2013

George Morris (born 29 August 1957) is a New Zealand former cricket umpire. He stood in four Test matches between 1985 and 1987 and eight ODI games between 1984 and 1988.

== See also ==
- List of Test cricket umpires
- List of One Day International cricket umpires
