= Steve Woodward =

New Zealand cricket umpire (born 1947)

Stephen Woodward
Personal information
- Full name: Stephen John Woodward
- Born: 1947 (age 78–79); New Zealand
- Role: Umpire

Umpiring information
- Tests umpired: 24 (1979–1991)
- ODIs umpired: 30 (1982–1992)
- WODIs umpired: 2 (1982–1999)
- Source: Cricinfo, 12 July 2013

Stephen John Woodward (born 1947) is a New Zealand cricket umpire who stood in 24 Test matches and 30 ODIs.

Born in New Zealand, his first Test match was the New Zealand vs Pakistan test at Napier in 1979, while his last came in the New Zealand v Sri Lanka test at Wellington in 1991. He also stood in 30 one day internationals and officiated in New Zealand domestic cricket. Unusually for an umpire, he had no experience as a player at first class level.

== See also ==
- List of Test cricket umpires
- List of One Day International cricket umpires
