= Fred Goodall =

New Zealand cricket umpire (1938–2021)

Fred Goodall ONZM ED
Personal information
- Full name: Frederick Robert Goodall
- Born: 9 January 1938; Greymouth, New Zealand
- Died: 18 October 2021 (aged 83); Wellington, New Zealand
- Role: Umpire

Umpiring information
- Tests umpired: 24 (1965–1988)
- ODIs umpired: 15 (1973–1988)
- WODIs umpired: 1 (1982)
- Source: Cricinfo, 19 October 2021

Frederick Robert Goodall ONZM ED (9 January 1938 – 18 October 2021) was a New Zealand international cricket umpire who officiated in 24 Tests and 15 One-Day Internationals between 1965 and 1988.

Goodall was the son of Fred and Betty Goodall from Greymouth.

A Lieutenant Colonel in the New Zealand Army Territorial Force, Goodall obtained a masters degree in Geography from the University of Canterbury and taught at St Andrew's College, Christchurch, where he was head of geography.

He began umpiring aged 19, made his first-class umpiring debut in December 1963, and went on to umpire 102 first-class matches before retiring in 1989. His first match as a One-Day International umpire was at Christchurch in February 1973, the first one-day international played in New Zealand. He had made his Test umpiring debut eight years earlier, also at Christchurch.

He obtained unwanted fame during the second Test between New Zealand and West Indies at Christchurch's Lancaster Park in February 1980. The West Indies came into the series considering themselves favourites, but suffered upset losses in a provincial match, the first Test, and a one day international against a New Zealand team rising in strength. Coming into the second Test the West Indies challenged officialdom, for example stating the pitches were too long to blunt their pace bowlers (measurements in their presence proved the pitch length was correct).

On the third day of the second Test, after disagreeing with several decisions, the West Indies team refused to emerge from their dressing room after the tea break unless Goodall was immediately replaced. After 11 minutes, they were persuaded to resume.

On the fourth day matters escalated. Colin Croft made a delayed appeal for caught behind, after batsman Richard Hadlee swung and, (as replays showed), missed. Goodall turned the appeal down. Croft delivered the next ball very wide in the crease.

Coming in for the third delivery he deliberately collided with Goodall at the end of his bowling run-up.

West Indies captain Clive Lloyd later said of the incident, "They were just bad umpires but we should not have behaved in that manner. I think if I'd had my time over again I'd have handled it differently. I regret it even until this day, that things went so far."

Other teams did not have similar issues with Goodall’s umpiring. He continued officiating in Tests and one-day matches after the infamous Christchurch incident. His last international match was a One-Day International at Napier in March 1988.

Goodall was New Zealand’s first Umpiring Development Officer. His wife Diana was also an umpire, and on one occasion they officiated together in a women’s international match.

In the 1999 New Year Honours, Goodall was appointed an Officer of the New Zealand Order of Merit, for services to sport.

Goodall died in Wellington on 18 October 2021, aged 83.

== See also ==
- List of Test cricket umpires
- List of One Day International cricket umpires
