= Indian cricket team in New Zealand in 1975–76 =

International cricket tour

	India	New Zealand
- Dates: 15 January – 22 February 1976
Captains	Sunil Gavaskar	Glenn Turner

Test series
- Result: 3-match series drawn 1–1
Most runs	Sunil Gavaskar (266)	Bevan Congdon (218)
Most wickets	E. A. S. Prasanna (11); B. S. Chandrasekhar (11)	Richard Hadlee (12)

The India national cricket team toured New Zealand from 15 January to 22 February 1976 and played a three-match Test series against New Zealand. The series was drawn 1–1.

== Tour matches ==
=== Three-day: Central Districts v Indians ===
15–17 January 1976
Scorecard

Central Districts	v	Indians
152 (57.7 overs); Jock Edwards 43; EAS Prasanna 5/57 (20.7 overs)		259 (81.6 overs); Mohinder Amarnath 83; David O'Sullivan 3/65 (26 overs)
214 (76 overs); Mike Shrimpton 55; EAS Prasanna 5/87 (30 overs)		108/4 (34.7 overs); Parthasarathy Sharma 62*; David O'Sullivan 2/29 (15 overs)

Indians won by 6 wickets
McLean Park, Napier
Umpires: Dennis Copps and H Stratford

- Central Districts won the toss and elected to bat.

=== One-day: Wellington v Indians ===
19 January 1976
Scorecard

Indians; 160 (34.7 overs)	v	Wellington; 162/1 (32.2 overs)
Dilip Vengsarkar 35; Jonathan Ross 3/31 (7 overs)		John Morrison 58*; Srinivasaraghavan Venkataraghavan 1/22 (7 overs)

Wellington won by 9 wickets
Basin Reserve, Wellington
Umpires: Trevor Martin and Robert Monteith

- Indians won the toss and elected to bat.

=== Three-day: Northern Districts v Indians ===
20–22 January 1976
Scorecard

Northern Districts	v	Indians
305/7 dec. (77.7 overs); Madan Lal 101*; Bob Cunis 3/68 (19 overs)		240/6 dec. (75 overs); Andrew Roberts 104*; Srinivasaraghavan Venkataraghavan 2/57 (27 overs)
199 (41.7 overs); Surinder Amarnath 59; Cliff Dickeson 4/80 (13.7overs)		123 (38.1 overs); Andrew Roberts 36; Bhagwat Chandrasekhar 4/43 (15 overs)

Indians won by 141 runs
Seddon Park, Hamilton
Umpires: Fred Goodall and John Hastie

- Indians won the toss and elected to bat.

=== Three-day: Otago v Indians ===
31 January–2 February 1976
Scorecard

Indians	v	Otago
304/5d (96 overs); Dilip Vengsarkar 130; Brian McKechnie 3/64 (22 overs)		252/9d (79 overs); Glenn Turner 121*; Srinivasaraghavan Venkataraghavan 5/87 (31 overs)
144 (37.6 overs); Parthasarathy Sharma 45; Peter Petherick 6/36 (10.6 overs)		116/2 (32.4 overs); Henry Sampson 57; Bishan Singh Bedi 2/38 (10.4 overs)

Match drawn
Carisbrook, Dunedin
Umpires: Eric Dempster and Ernest Wainscott

- Indians won the toss and elected to bat.

== Test Matches ==
=== 1st Test ===
24–28 January 1976
Scorecard

New Zealand	v	India
266 (87 overs); Bevan Congdon 54; Bhagwat Chandrasekhar 6/94 (30 overs)		414 (121.7 overs); Surinder Amarnath 124; Bevan Congdon 5/65 (26.7 overs)
215 (70.2 overs); John Parker 70; Erapalli Prasanna 8/76 (23 overs)		71/2 (14.2 overs); Sunil Gavaskar 35; Hedley Howarth 2/15 (5.2 overs)

India won by 8 wickets
Eden Park, Auckland
Umpires: Dennis Copps (NZ) and Robert Monteith (NZ)

- New Zealand won the toss and elected to bat.

=== 2nd Test ===
5–10 February 1976
Scorecard

India	v	New Zealand
270 (60.6 overs); Gundappa Viswanath 83; Richard Collinge 6/63 (16.6 overs)		403 (132.1 overs); Glenn Turner 117; Madan Lal 5/134 (43 overs)
255/6 (79 overs); Gundappa Viswanath 79; Andy Roberts 1/12 (5 overs)

Match drawn
Lancaster Park, Christchurch
Umpires: Dennis Copps (NZ) and Ralph Gardiner (NZ)

- India won the toss and elected to bat.

=== 3rd Test ===
13–17 February 1976
Scorecard

India	v	New Zealand
220 (73.7 overs); Brijesh Patel 81; Richard Hadlee 4/35 (14 overs)		334 (113.7 overs); Mark Burgess 95; Bhagwat Chandrasekhar 3/55 (22.5 overs)
81 (26.3 overs); Surinder Amarnath 27; Richard Hadlee 7/23 (8.3 overs)

New Zealand won by an innings and 33 runs
Basin Reserve, Wellington
Umpires: Ralph Gardiner (NZ) and Robert Monteith (NZ)

- India won the toss and elected to bat.

== ODI series ==
=== 1st ODI ===
21 February 1976
Scorecard

India; 154 (35 overs)	v	New Zealand; 155/1 (30.3 overs)
Gundappa Viswanath 56 (88); Richard Collinge 5/23 (7 overs)		Glenn Turner 63* (121); Bishan Singh Bedi 1/24 (7 overs)

New Zealand won by 9 wickets
Lancaster Park, Christchurch
Umpires: Eric Dempster (NZ) and Mansfield Rangi (NZ)
Player of the match: Richard Collinge (NZ)

- India won the toss and elected to bat.
- Parthasarathy Sharma, Dilip Vengsarkar and Syed Kirmani (all Ind), and Jock Edwards (NZ) made their ODI debuts.

=== 2nd ODI ===
22 February 1976
Scorecard

New Zealand; 236/8 (35 overs)	v	India; 156 (31.6 overs)
Glenn Turner 52 (63); B. S. Chandrasekhar 3/36 (7 overs)		Brijesh Patel 44 (51); Dayle Hadlee 2/18 (7 overs)

New Zealand won by 80 runs
Eden Park, Auckland
Umpires: Ralph Gardiner (NZ) and John Hastie (NZ)
Player of the match: Ken Wadsworth (NZ)

- New Zealand won the toss and elected to bat.
- Sudhakar Rao, Pochiah Krishnamurthy and B. S. Chandrasekhar (all Ind) made their ODI debuts.
