= English cricket team in New Zealand in 1977–78 =

International cricket tour

The England national cricket team toured New Zealand in February and March 1978 and played a three-match Test series against the New Zealand national cricket team. The series was drawn 1–1, with New Zealand defeating England in a Test match for the first time in their history.

The English team had toured Pakistan immediately before the series in New Zealand, playing three Test matches and three One Day Internationals in the country. They arrived in New Zealand in late January 1978 and played four matches against New Zealand domestic sides before the first Test of the series at Wellington in mid-February. Two more first-class matches were played between the first and second Tests, before the tour ended following the third Test at Auckland at the beginning of March.

== Test series ==
=== First Test ===
10–15 February 1978
Scorecard
Wisden report

New Zealand	v	England
228 (87.6 overs); JG Wright 55 (244); CM Old 6/54 (30 overs)		215 (94.4 overs); G Boycott 77 (302); RJ Hadlee 4/74 (28 overs)
123 (44.3 overs); RW Anderson 26 (62); Extras 26; RGD Willis 5/32 (15 overs)		64 (27.3 overs); IT Botham 19 (24); RJ Hadlee 6/26 (13.3 overs)

New Zealand won by 72 runs
Basin Reserve, Wellington
Umpires: WRC Gardiner and RL Monteith

- England won the toss and chose to field
- SL Boock and JG Wright (both New Zealand) made their Test debuts
  13 February was a rest day

=== Second Test ===
24 February–1 March 1978
Scorecard
Wisden report

England	v	New Zealand
418 (145.5 overs); IT Botham 103 (288); RJ Hadlee 4/147 (43 overs)		235 (92.7 overs); RW Anderson 62 (162); IT Botham 5/73 (24.7 overs)
96/4d (22 overs); IT Botham 30* (31); RO Collinge 2/29 (9 overs)		105 (27 overs); RJ Hadlee 39 (62); RGD Willis 4/14 (7 overs)

England won by 174 runs
Lancaster Park, Christchurch
Umpires: FR Goodall and RL Monteith

- England won the toss and chose to bat
- CT Radley (England) made his Test debut
  27 February was a rest day

=== Third Test ===
4–10 March 1978
Scorecard
Wisden report

New Zealand	v	England
315 (105.6 overs); GP Howarth 122 (356); IT Botham 5/109 (34 overs)		429 (156.3 overs); CT Radley 158 (524); SL Boock 5/67 (28.3 overs)
382/8 (118 overs); GP Howarth 102 (301); G Miller 3/99 (30 overs)

Drawn
Eden Park, Auckland
Umpires: WRC Gardiner and JBR Hastie

- New Zealand won the toss and chose to bat
- The match was played over six days
  7 March was a rest day

== Tour matches ==
Four matches were played before the first Test, three first-class matches against Auckland, Central Districts, and Canterbury and a 35-over List A match against Northern Districts. Following the first Test England played two more first-class matches, one against Otago and the other against a Young New Zealand side. The tourists did not lose any of these matches, although the game against Central Districts ended in a tie.

27–29 January 1978	England XI	v	Auckland	Match drawn
Scorecard	210 (69.2 overs); GRJ Roope 33; IT Botham 33; MC Snedden 3/35 (14.2 overs)		182/4d (54 overs); MG Burgess 74; CM Old 2/40 (11 overs)	Eden Park, Auckland; Umpires: WRC Gardiner and RL Monteith
Scorecard	208/3d (62.1 overs); BC Rose 107; MC Snedden 1/31 (10 overs)		114/3 (39 overs); RJ Kasper 61*; PH Edmonds 2/24 (11 overs)	Eden Park, Auckland; Umpires: WRC Gardiner and RL Monteith
Auckland won the toss and chose to field; Three-day first-class match

30 January 1978	England XI; 164/9 (35 overs)	v	Northern Districts; 83/3 (20.3 overs)	England won via faster scoring rate
Scorecard	England XI; 164/9 (35 overs)	v	Northern Districts; 83/3 (20.3 overs)	Seddon Park, Hamilton; Umpires: BA Bricknell and JBR Hastie
Scorecard	DW Randall 24; CW Dickeson 3/58 (7 overs)		JG Wright 24; RGD Willis 1/10 (5 overs)	Seddon Park, Hamilton; Umpires: BA Bricknell and JBR Hastie
Northern Districts won the toss and chose to field; Only 20.3 overs were possible during the Northern Districts innings; 35 over List A match				Seddon Park, Hamilton; Umpires: BA Bricknell and JBR Hastie

1–3 February 1978	England XI	v	Central Districts	Tie
Scorecard	296/6d (74.1 overs); MW Gatting 66; AB Jordan 3/38 (13.1 overs)		198 (52.5 overs); DR O'Sullivan 31; RGD Willis 3/45 (10 overs)	Pukekura Park, New Plymouth; Umpires: David Kinsella and Steve Woodward
Scorecard	104 (49.1 overs); GA Cope 20*; DR O'Sullivan 5/14 (17.1 overs)		202; TB Horne 40; RGD Willis 2/13 (6 overs)	Pukekura Park, New Plymouth; Umpires: David Kinsella and Steve Woodward
England won the toss and chose to bat; Three-day first-class match

5–7 February 1978	England XI	v	Canterbury	Drawn
Scorecard	173 (75 overs); CM Old 51; RJ Hadlee 5/50 (17 overs)		144 (41.3 overs); PG Coman 51; RGD Willis 4/46 (11 overs)	Lancaster Park, Christchurch; Umpires: Fred Goodall and DC Wilson
Scorecard	230/4d (55 overs); IT Botham 126*; SL Boock 2/50 (19 overs)		142/5 (44 overs); RJ Hadlee 56; RGD Willis 2/8 (10 overs)	Lancaster Park, Christchurch; Umpires: Fred Goodall and DC Wilson
Canterbury won the toss and chose to field; Three-day first-class match

17–19 February 1978	Otago	v	England XI	England XI won by 6 wickets
Scorecard (subscription required)	130 (47.3 overs); CM Kirk 22*; JK Lever 5/59 (16 overs)		195 (102 overs); CT Radley 44; BL Cairns 4/73 (42 overs)	Carisbrook, Dunedin; Umpires: EW Dempster and NF Tapper
Scorecard (subscription required)	146 (47.4 overs); BL Cairns 44; IT Botham 7/58 (19.4 overs)		82/4 (23.6 overs); DW Randall 28; GB Thomson 3/44 (12 overs)	Carisbrook, Dunedin; Umpires: EW Dempster and NF Tapper
Otago won the toss and chose to bat; Three-day first-class match

20–22 February 1978	England XI	v	Young New Zealand	England XI won by an innings and 23 runs
Scorecard (subscription required)	310 (114.7 overs); DW Randall 104; EJ Gray 4/58 (25.7 overs)		139 (57.1 overs); BA Edgar 41; G Miller 6/71 (22.1 overs)	Temuka Oval, Temuka; Umpires: AH Hart and EG Wainscott
Scorecard (subscription required)			148 (following on); GN Edwards 28; JK Lever 4/26 (8.4 overs)	Temuka Oval, Temuka; Umpires: AH Hart and EG Wainscott
England XI won the toss and chose to bat; Three-day first-class match

== Gallery ==
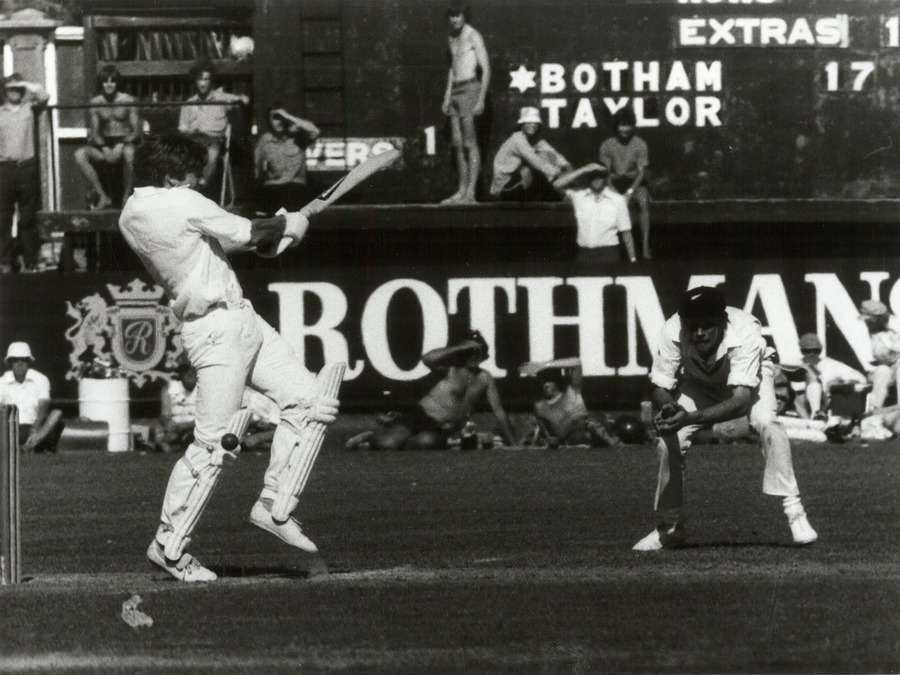
Ian Botham, Wellington test

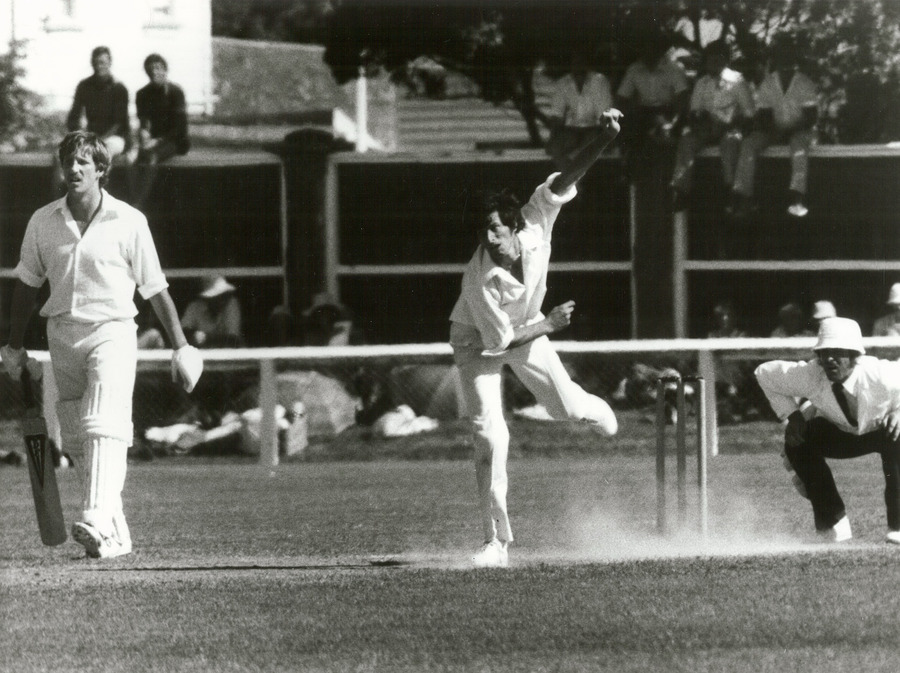
Richard Hadlee bowling. Botham at non-strikers end, Wellington

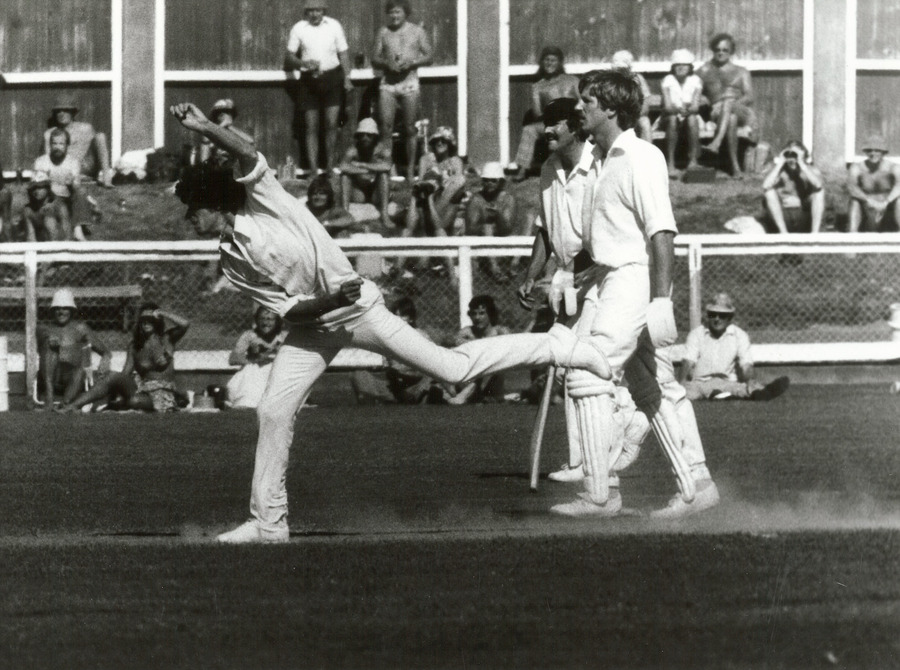
Richard Hadlee bowling and Ian Botham (non-striker), Wellington

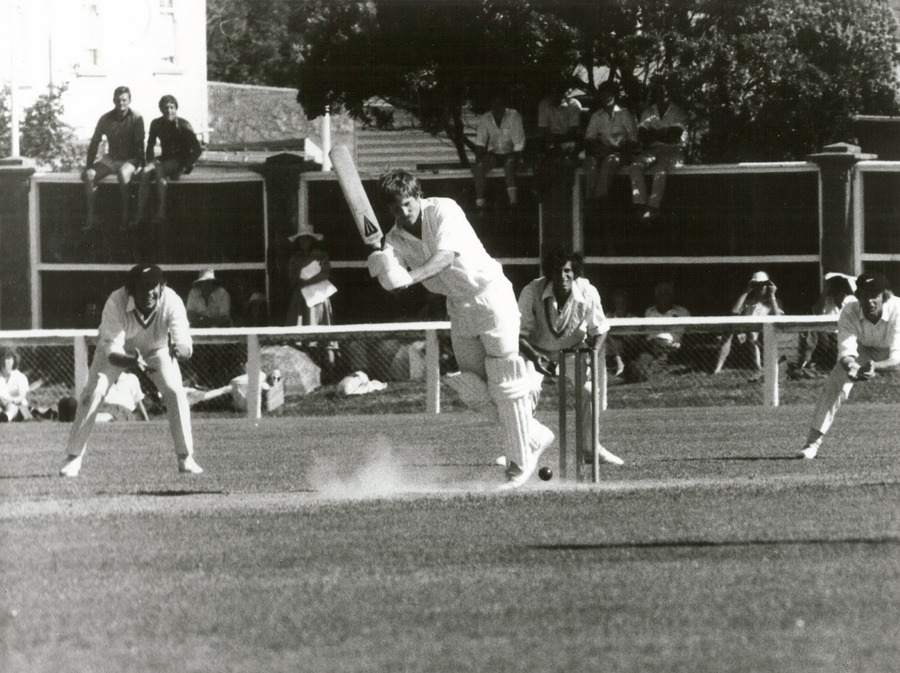
Ian Botham batting in Wellington

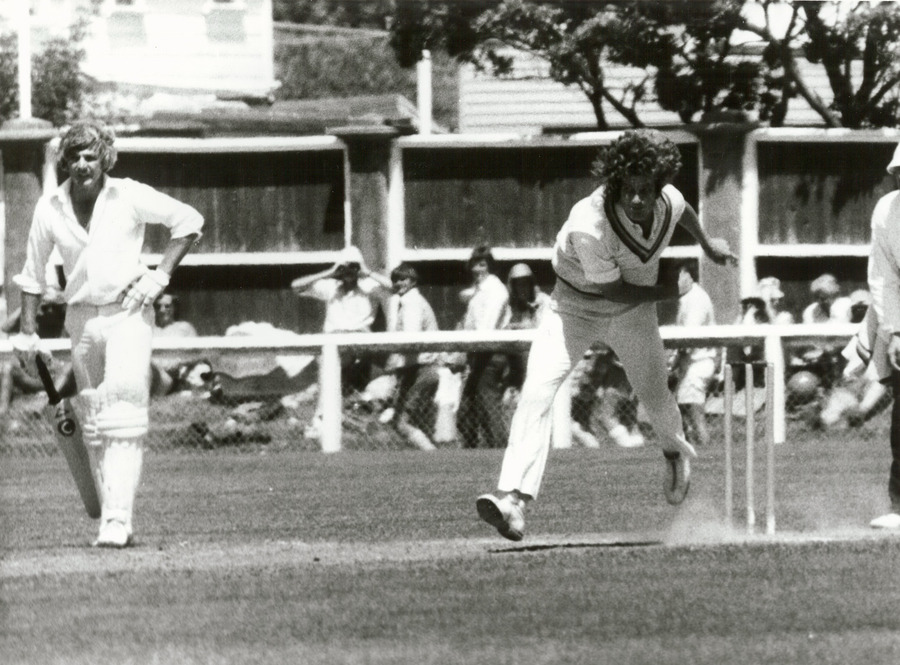
Bob Willis bowling in Wellington

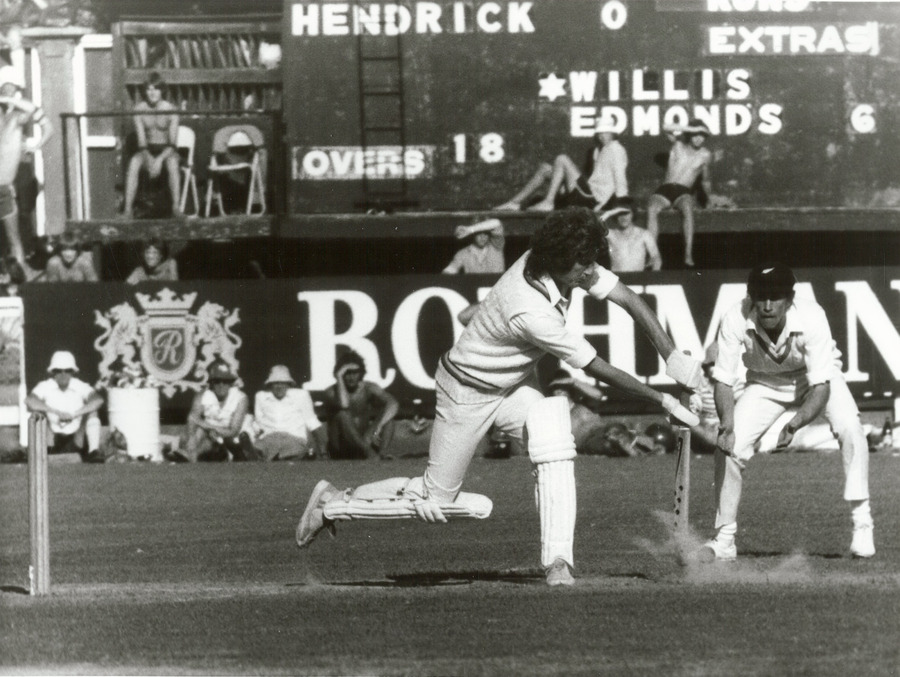
Bob Willis batting in Wellington

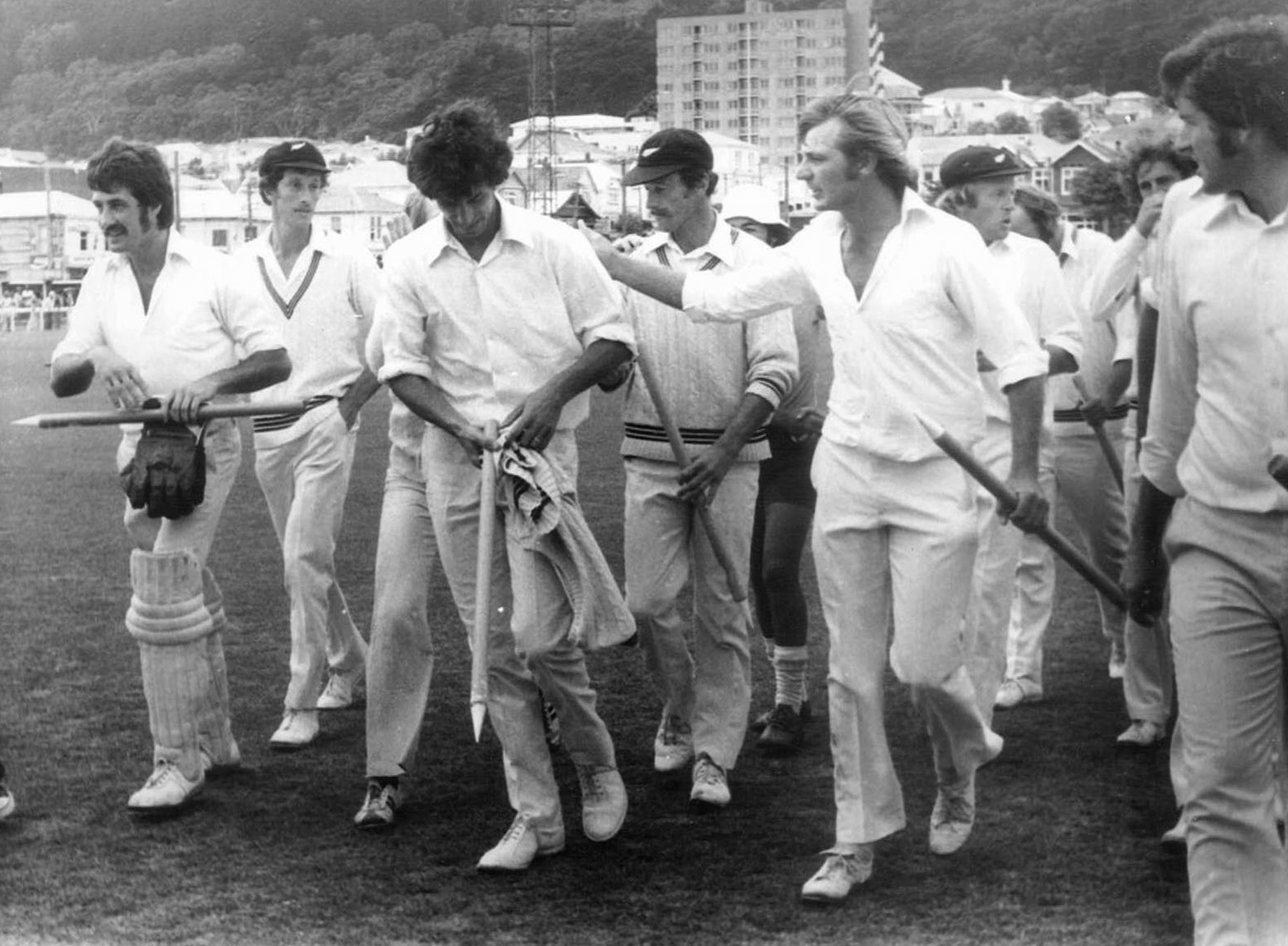
New Zealand celebrate victory in Wellington

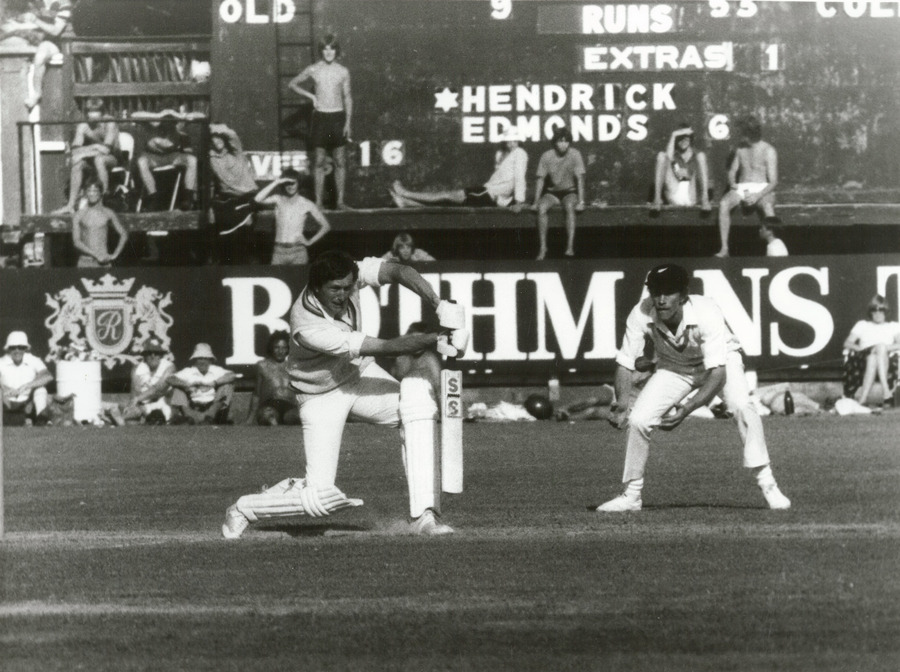
Mike Hendrick batting in Wellington

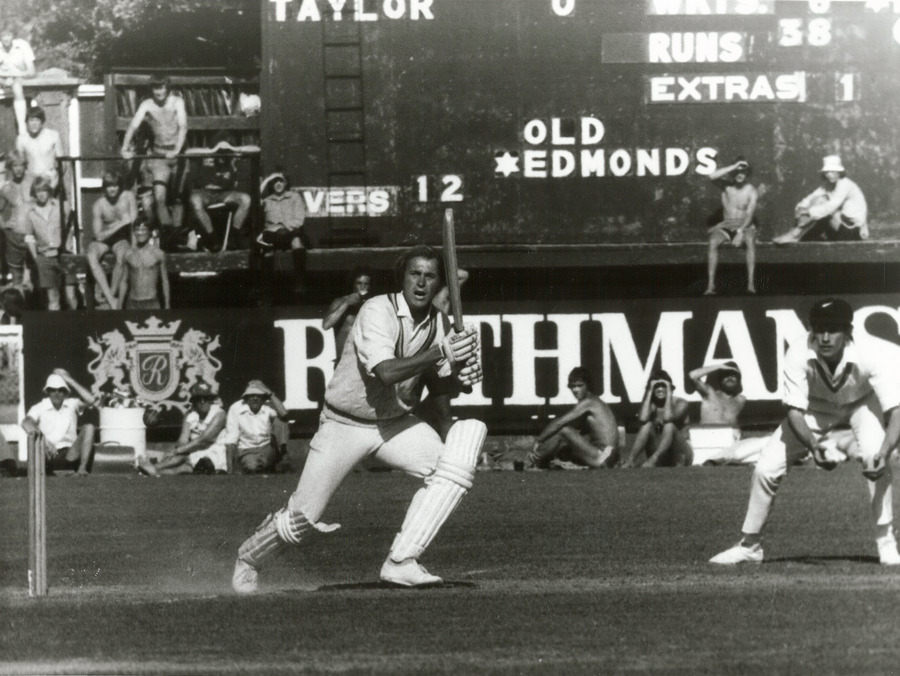
Phil Edmonds batting in Wellington

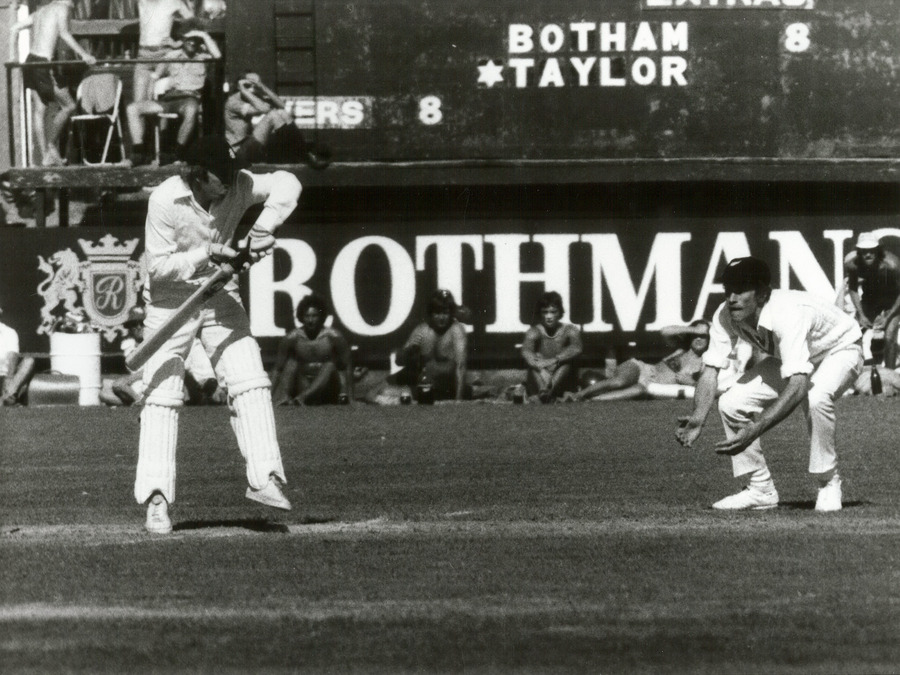
Bob Taylor (cricketer) batting in Wellington

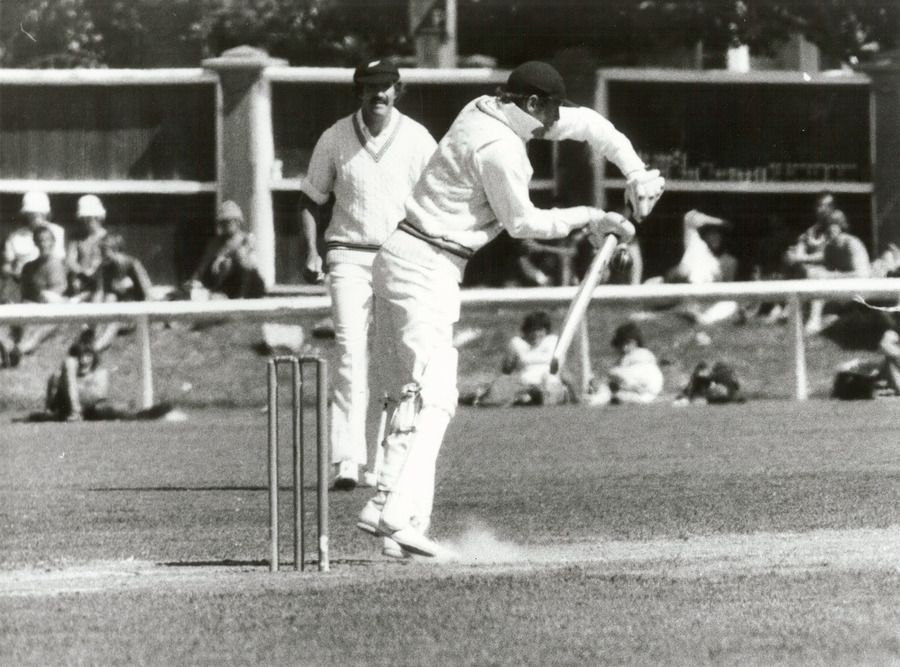
Geoffrey Boycott in Wellington

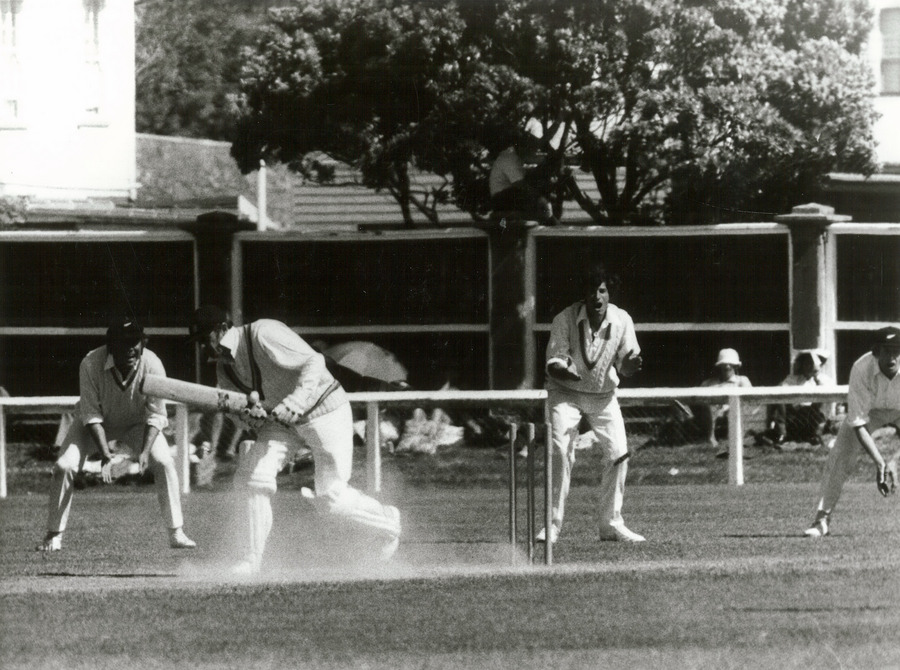
Boycott dismissed in Wellington

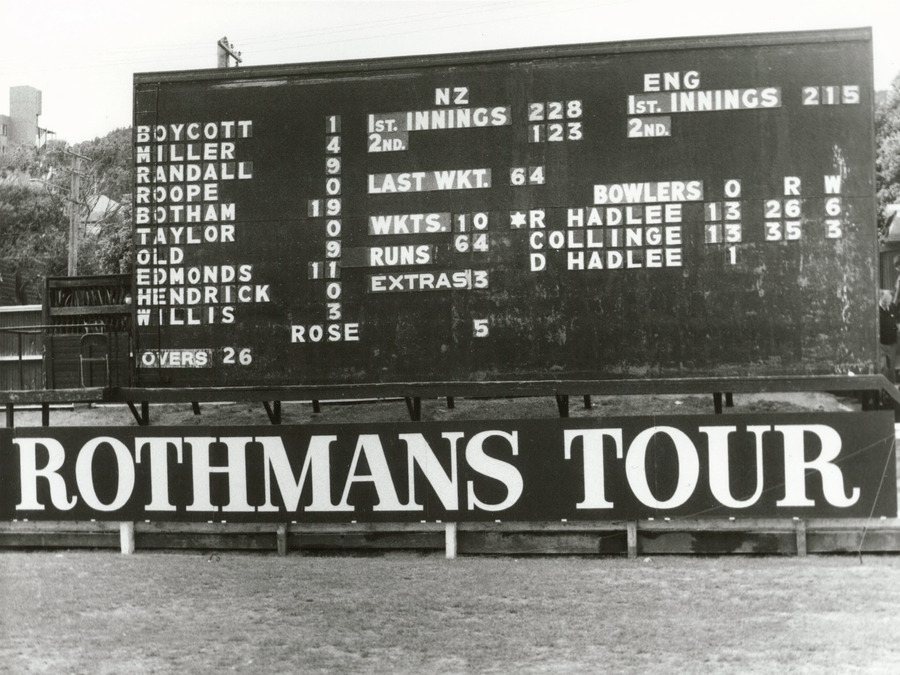
The final scoreboard from Wellington
