= English cricket team in New Zealand in 1974–75 =

International cricket tour

The England national cricket team toured New Zealand in February and March 1975 and played a two-match Test series against the New Zealand national cricket team. England won the series 1–0 with one match drawn.

== Test series summary ==
=== First Test ===
20–25 February 1975
(5-day match)
Scorecard

England	v	New Zealand
593/6d (153 overs); KWR Fletcher 216 (413); DR Hadlee 2/102 (20 overs)		326 (89 overs); JM Parker 121 (297); AW Greig 5/98 (26 overs)
		184 (f/o) (57.5 overs); JFM Morrison 58 (114); AW Greig 5/51 (15 overs)

England won by an innings and 83 runs
Eden Park, Auckland
Umpires: DEA Copps (NZ) and WRC Gardiner (NZ)

- England won the toss and elected to bat.
- 24 February was taken as a rest day.
- EJ Chatfield and GP Howarth (both NZ) made their Test debuts.

=== Second Test ===
28 February–5 March 1975
(6-day match)
Scorecard

New Zealand	v	England
342 (89.5 overs); GM Turner 98 (256); GG Arnold 3/80 (25 overs)		272/2 (83 overs); DL Amiss 164* (351); HJ Howarth 1/53 (18 overs)

Match drawn
Lancaster Park, Christchurch
Umpires: DEA Copps (NZ) and WRC Gardiner (NZ)

- England won the toss and elected to field.
- The match was scheduled for five days but extended to six, by playing on the scheduled rest day.
- There was no play on the first, second and final days.

== One-day internationals ==
=== First ODI ===
8 March 1975 (35–over match)
Scorecard

England; 136 (34.1 overs)	v	New Zealand; 15/0 (4 overs)
B Wood 33 (90); HJ Howarth 3/35 (7 overs)		GM Turner 8* (16)

No result
Carisbrook, Dunedin
Umpires: EW Dempster (NZ) and EG Wainscott (NZ)

- New Zealand won the toss and elected to field.
- FJ Titmus (ENG), and BG Hadlee and GP Howarth (both NZ) made their ODI debuts.

=== Second ODI ===
9 March 1975 (35–over match)
Scorecard

New Zealand; 227 (34.6 overs)	v	England; 35/1 (10 overs)
BE Congdon 101 (110); P Lever 4/35 (6.6 overs)		KWR Fletcher 18* (22); RO Collinge 1/9 (4 overs)

No result
Basin Reserve, Wellington
Umpires: JBR Hastie (NZ) and RL Monteith (NZ)
Player of the match: BE Congdon (NZ) and P Lever (ENG)

- New Zealand won the toss and elected to bat.
- JFM Morrison (NZ) made his ODI debut.
