= Australian cricket team in New Zealand in 1973–74 =

International cricket tour

Australia cricket team in New Zealand in 1973–74
	New Zealand	Australia
- Dates: 1 – 31 March 1974
Captains	BE Congdon	IM Chappell

Test series
- Result: 3-match series drawn 1–1
Most runs	GM Turner (403)	GS Chappell (449)
Most wickets	RO Collinge (17)	MHN Walker (14)

One Day International series
- Results: Australia won the 2-match series 2–0
Most runs	BE Congdon (131)	IM Chappell (169)
Most wickets	RO Collinge (2)	AA Mallett (3); GS Chappell (3); GJ Gilmour (3); MHN Walker (3)

The Australian cricket team toured New Zealand in the 1973-74 season to play a three-match Test series against New Zealand. The series was drawn 1-1. It was the first time New Zealand had beaten Australia in a Test match, and the first time they had won a Test match since 1969.

== Australian squad ==
Australia had just defeated New Zealand 2-0 in a series in Australia.

Paul Sheahan was unavailable for selection. The team selected was as follows:

- Batsmen - Ian Chappell (captain), Greg Chappell, Keith Stackpole, Ian Davis, Ian Redpath, Ashley Woodcock, Doug Walters
- Fast bowlers - Max Walker, Geoff Dymock
- Spinners - Ray Bright, Ashley Mallett, Kerry O'Keeffe
- All-rounders - Gary Gilmour
- Wicketkeepers - Rod Marsh
- Manager - Frank Bryant

== Test series ==
=== 1st Test ===
1–6 March 1974
(5-day match)
Scorecard

Australia	v	New Zealand
511/6d (105.5 overs); GS Chappell 247* (356); DR Hadlee 2/107 (27 overs)		484 (169 overs); BE Congdon 132 (360); G Dymock 3/77 (35 overs)
460/8 (101 overs); GS Chappell 133 (175); BE Congdon 3/60 (13 overs)

Match drawn
Basin Reserve, Wellington
Umpires: DEA Copps and FR Goodall

- Australia won the toss and elected to bat.
- 4 March was taken as a rest day.

=== 2nd Test ===
8–13 March 1974
(5-day match)
Scorecard

Australia	v	New Zealand
223 (58.2 overs); IR Redpath 71 (205); BE Congdon 3/33 (11 overs)		255 (73.6 overs); GM Turner 101 (260); MHN Walker 4/60 (19.6 overs)
259 (67.4 overs); KD Walters 65 (103); RJ Hadlee 4/71 (18.4 overs)		230/5 (83.6 overs); GM Turner 110* (355); MHN Walker 2/50 (28 overs)

New Zealand won by 5 wickets
Lancaster Park, Christchurch
Umpires: JBR Hastie and RL Monteith

- New Zealand won the toss and elected to field.
- 11 March was taken as a rest day.

There was controversy during the match when New Zealand batsman Glenn Turner argued on the field with Ian Chappell.

=== 3rd Test ===
22–24 March 1974
(5-day match)
Scorecard

Australia	v	New Zealand
221 (46.2 overs); KD Walters 104* (138); RO Collinge 5/82 (18 overs)		112 (30.2 overs); GM Turner 41 (101); GJ Gilmour 5/64 (15 overs)
346 (79.4 overs); IR Redpath 159* (310); RO Collinge 4/84 (16.4 overs)		158 (53 overs); GM Turner 72 (144); MHN Walker 4/39 (19 overs)

Australia won by 297 runs
Eden Park, Auckland
Umpires: DEA Copps and WRC Gardiner

- New Zealand won the toss and elected to field.
- The match was scheduled for five days but completed in three.

The New Zealand second innings of 158 is the lowest all-out Test innings to include a century partnership (Glenn Turner and John Parker added 107 runs for the first wicket).

== ODI series ==
=== 1st ODI ===
30 March 1974 (35–over match)
Scorecard

New Zealand; 194/9 (35 overs)	v	Australia; 195/3 (24.3 overs)
BE Congdon 82 (112); GS Chappell 3/51 (7 overs)		IM Chappell 83 (68); DR O'Sullivan 1/38 (7 overs)

Australia won by 7 wickets
Carisbrook, Dunedin
Umpires: EW Dempster (NZ) and LHG Harmer (NZ)

- New Zealand won the toss and elected to bat.
- BL Cairns and DR O'Sullivan (both NZ), and RJ Bright, IC Davis, G Dymock, GJ Gilmour and MHN Walker (all AUS) made their ODI debuts.

=== 2nd ODI ===
31 March 1974 (35–over match)
Scorecard

Australia; 265/5 (35 overs)	v	New Zealand; 234/6 (35 overs)
IM Chappell 86 (67); RO Collinge 2/38 (7 overs)		KJ Wadsworth 104 (98); AA Mallett 3/47 (7 overs)

Australia won by 31 runs
Lancaster Park, Christchurch
Umpires: FR Goodall (NZ) and EG Wainscott (NZ)

- Australia won the toss and elected to bat.
- AJ Woodcock (AUS) and JM Parker (NZ) made their ODI debuts.
