= List of cricketers who have scored centuries in both innings of a Test match =

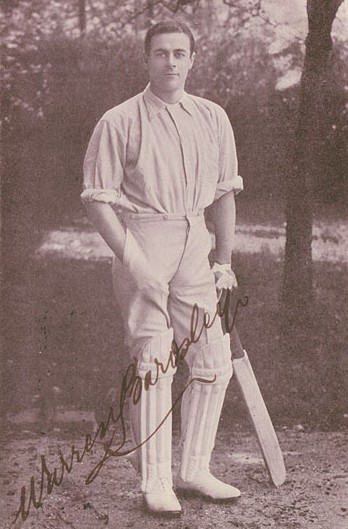
Bardsley c.1909

In cricket, a player is said to have scored a century when they score 100 or more runs in a single innings. Test cricket, the longest version of the game, involves two innings per side in a match. An individual scoring centuries in each innings of a Test match, a feat which is called "Twin centuries," is considered a "milestone" by critics. Players from all teams that are full members of the International Cricket Council (ICC) except Ireland and Afghanistan have scored centuries in both innings of a Test. (Note: The teams are Australia, England, South Africa, India, New Zealand, West Indies, Pakistan, Sri Lanka, Zimbabwe, Bangladesh, Ireland and Afghanistan.)

The first player to score centuries in both innings of a Test match was Warren Bardsley of Australia, who made 136 and 130 against England in August 1909. Since then, the feat has been accomplished by 80 players on 98 occasions as of July 2025. India's Sunil Gavaskar and Australians Ricky Ponting and David Warner are the only cricketers who have scored two centuries in a match on three occasions, while 12 players have achieved the feat twice. England's Graham Gooch has the highest aggregate in a match while scoring centuries in both the innings; his combined tally of 456 runs in the match—333 in the first and 123 in the second innings—was entered into The Guinness Book of Records as "Most runs scored by a player in a Test match (male)". His feat of scoring a triple century and a century was subsequently equalled, though with lower scores, by Kumar Sangakkara: while eight other players have scored a double century and a single century in the match. Allan Border and Shubman Gill are the only players to have scored 150 (or more) in each innings. Sri Lanka's Aravinda de Silva is the only player to remain not out in both innings.

There have been seven instances of two players performing the feat in the same match—Denis Compton (England) and Arthur Morris (Australia) in 1947, Australia's Greg Chappell and Ian Chappell (against New Zealand) in 1974, Asanka Gurusinha (Sri Lanka) and Andrew Jones (New Zealand) in 1991, Pakistan's Azhar Ali and Misbah-ul-Haq (against Australia) in 2014, David Warner (Australia) and Virat Kohli (India) in 2014, Sri Lanka's Dhananjaya de Silva and Kamindu Mendis (against Bangladesh) in 2024, and New Zealand's Devon Conway and Tom Latham (against West Indies) in 2025.

West Indies' Lawrence Rowe (1972) and Pakistan's Yasir Hameed (2003) are the only debutants to score centuries in both innings of a Test match. Andy Flower and Rishabh Pant are the only 2 players to achieve the feat as a designated wicket-keeper.

== Key ==
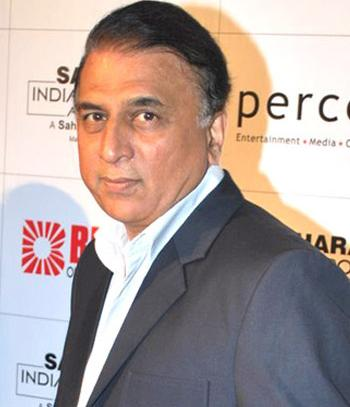
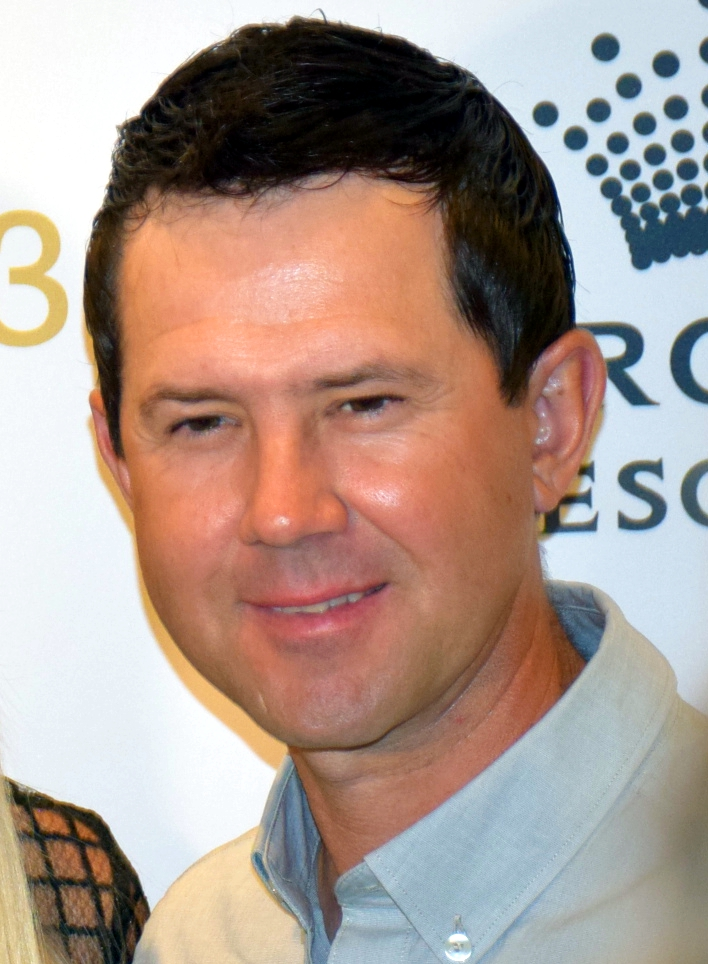
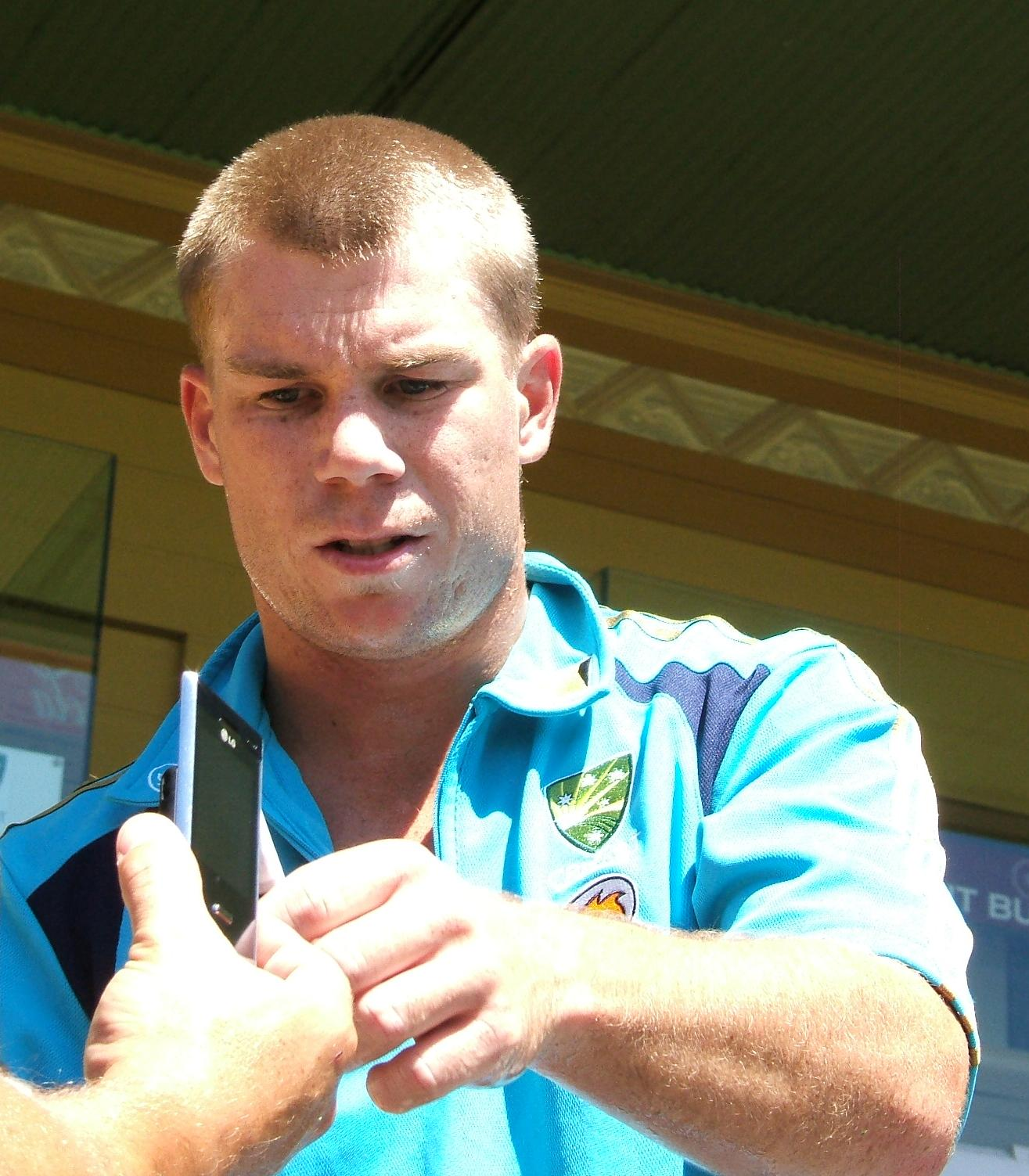
(L-R) Sunil Gavaskar, Ricky Ponting, and David Warner have scored two centuries in a match on three separate occasions.

Key
Symbol	Meaning
Player	The batsman who scored the centuries
Inn1	Score made by batsman in the first innings of the match
Inn2	Score made by batsman in the second innings of the match
*	Batsman remained not out
Team	The team the batsman was representing
Opposition	The team the batsman was playing against
Venue	The cricket ground where the match was played
Date	Starting date of the Test match
Result	Result for the team for which the century was scored

== Table ==
Cricketers who have scored centuries in both innings of a Test match
No.	Player	Inn1	Inn2	Team	Opposition	Venue	Date	Result	Ref
1	Warren Bardsley	136	130	Australia	England	The Oval, London	9 August 1909	Drawn	
2	Jack Russell	140	111	England	South Africa	Kingsmead Cricket Ground, Durban	16 February 1923	Won	
3	Herbert Sutcliffe (1/2)	176	127	England	Australia	Melbourne Cricket Ground, Melbourne	1 January 1925	Lost	
4	Wally Hammond	119*	177	England	Australia	Adelaide Oval, Adelaide	1 February 1929	Won	
5	Herbert Sutcliffe (2/2)	104	109*	England	South Africa	The Oval, London	17 August 1929	Drawn	
6	George Headley (1/2)	114	112	West Indies	England	Bourda, Georgetown	21 February 1930	Won	
7	Eddie Paynter	117	100	England	South Africa	Old Wanderers, Johannesburg	24 December 1938	Drawn	
8	George Headley (2/2)	106	107	West Indies	England	Lord's, London	24 June 1939	Lost	
9	Denis Compton	147	103*	England	Australia	Adelaide Oval, Adelaide	31 January 1947	Drawn	
10	Arthur Morris	122	124*	Australia	England	Adelaide Oval, Adelaide	31 January 1947	Drawn	
11	Alan Melville	189	104*	South Africa	England	Trent Bridge, Nottingham	7 June 1947	Drawn	
12	Bruce Mitchell	120	189*	South Africa	England	The Oval, London	16 August 1947	Drawn	
13	Don Bradman	132	127*	Australia	India	Melbourne Cricket Ground, Melbourne	1 January 1948	Won	
14	Vijay Hazare	116	145	India	Australia	Adelaide Oval, Adelaide	23 January 1948	Lost	
15	Everton Weekes	162	101	West Indies	India	Eden Gardens, Kolkata	31 December 1948	Drawn	
16	Jack Moroney	118	101*	Australia	South Africa	Old Wanderers, Johannesburg	10 February 1950	Drawn	
17	Clyde Walcott (1/2)	126	110	West Indies	Australia	Queen's Park Oval, Port of Spain	11 April 1955	Drawn	
18	Clyde Walcott (2/2)	155	110	West Indies	Australia	Sabina Park, Kingston	11 June 1955	Lost	
19	Garfield Sobers	125	109*	West Indies	Pakistan	Bourda, Georgetown	13 March 1958	Won	
20	Rohan Kanhai	117	115	West Indies	Australia	Adelaide Oval, Adelaide	27 January 1961	Drawn	
21	Hanif Mohammad	111	104	Pakistan	England	Bangabandhu National Stadium, Dhaka	19 January 1962	Drawn	
22	Bob Simpson	153	115	Australia	Pakistan	National Stadium, Karachi	24 October 1964	Drawn	
23	Doug Walters	242	103	Australia	West Indies	Sydney Cricket Ground, Sydney	14 February 1969	Won	
24	Sunil Gavaskar (1/3)	124	220	India	West Indies	Queen's Park Oval, Port of Spain	13 April 1971	Drawn	
25	Lawrence Rowe	214	100*	West Indies	New Zealand	Sabina Park, Kingston	16 February 1972	Drawn	
26	Greg Chappell (1/2)	247*	133	Australia	New Zealand	Basin Reserve, Wellington	1 March 1974	Drawn	
27	Ian Chappell	145	121	Australia	New Zealand	Basin Reserve, Wellington	1 March 1974	Drawn	
28	Glenn Turner	101	110*	New Zealand	Australia	Lancaster Park, Christchurch	8 March 1974	Won	
29	Greg Chappell (2/2)	123	109*	Australia	West Indies	The Gabba, Brisbane	28 November 1975	Won	
30	Gordon Greenidge	134	101	West Indies	England	Old Trafford, Manchester	8 July 1976	Won	
31	Geoff Howarth	122	102	New Zealand	England	Eden Park, Auckland	4 March 1978	Drawn	
32	Sunil Gavaskar (2/3)	111	137	India	Pakistan	National Stadium, Karachi	14 November 1978	Lost	
33	Sunil Gavaskar (3/3)	107	182*	India	West Indies	Eden Gardens, Kolkata	29 December 1978	Drawn	
34	Allan Border (1/2)	150*	153	Australia	Pakistan	Gaddafi Stadium, Lahore	18 March 1980	Drawn	
35	Duleep Mendis	105	105	Sri Lanka	India	M. A. Chidambaram Stadium, Madras	17 September 1982	Drawn	
36	Javed Miandad	104	103*	Pakistan	New Zealand	Niaz Stadium, Hyderabad	25 November 1984	Won	
37	Allan Border (2/2)	140	114*	Australia	New Zealand	Lancaster Park, Christchurch	28 February 1986	Drawn	
38	Dean Jones	116	121*	Australia	Pakistan	Adelaide Oval, Adelaide	19 January 1990	Drawn	
39	Graham Gooch	333	123	England	India	Lord's, London	26 July 1990	Won	
40	Asanka Gurusinha	119	102	Sri Lanka	New Zealand	Seddon Park, Hamilton	22 February 1991	Drawn	
41	Andrew Jones	122	100*	New Zealand	Sri Lanka	Seddon Park, Hamilton	22 February 1991	Drawn	
42	Alec Stewart	118	143	England	West Indies	Kensington Oval, Bridgetown	8 April 1994	Won	
43	Gary Kirsten	102	133	South Africa	India	Eden Gardens, Kolkata	27 November 1996	Won	
44	Aravinda de Silva (1/2)	138*	103*	Sri Lanka	Pakistan	SSC Cricket Ground, Colombo	26 April 1997	Drawn	
45	Steve Waugh	108	116	Australia	England	Old Trafford, Manchester	3 July 1997	Won	
46	Aravinda de Silva (2/2)	146	120	Sri Lanka	India	SSC Cricket Ground, Colombo	9 August 1997	Drawn	
47	Grant Flower	104	151	Zimbabwe	New Zealand	Harare Sports Club, Harare	18 September 1997	Drawn	
48	Rahul Dravid (1/2)	190	103*	India	New Zealand	Seddon Park, Hamilton	2 January 1999	Drawn	
49	Wajahatullah Wasti	133	121*	Pakistan	Sri Lanka	Gaddafi Stadium, Lahore	4 March 1999	Drawn	
50	Andy Flower	142	199*	Zimbabwe	South Africa	Harare Sports Club, Harare	7 September 2001	Lost	
51	Brian Lara	221	130	West Indies	Sri Lanka	SSC Cricket Ground, Colombo	29 November 2001	Lost	
52	Matthew Hayden (1/2)	197	103	Australia	England	The Gabba, Brisbane	7 November 2002	Won	
53	Yasir Hameed	170	105	Pakistan	Bangladesh	National Stadium, Karachi	20 August 2003	Won	
54	Matthew Hayden (2/2)	117	132	Australia	Sri Lanka	Cazalys Stadium, Cairns	9 July 2004	Drawn	
55	Michael Vaughan	103	101*	England	West Indies	Lord's, London	22 July 2004	Won	
56	Marcus Trescothick	105	107	England	West Indies	Edgbaston Cricket Ground, Birmingham	29 July 2004	Won	
57	Rahul Dravid (2/2)	110	135	India	Pakistan	Eden Gardens, Kolkata	16 March 2005	Won	
58	Ricky Ponting (1/3)	149	104*	Australia	West Indies	The Gabba, Brisbane	3 November 2005	Won	
59	Inzamam-ul-Haq	109	100*	Pakistan	England	Iqbal Stadium, Faisalabad	20 November 2005	Drawn	
60	Ricky Ponting (2/3)	120	143*	Australia	South Africa	Sydney Cricket Ground, Sydney,	2 January 2006	Won	
61	Ricky Ponting (3/3)	103	116	Australia	South Africa	Kingsmead Cricket Ground, Durban	24 March 2006	Won	
62	Mohammad Yousuf	102	124	Pakistan	West Indies	National Stadium, Karachi	27 November 2006	Won	
63	Jacques Kallis (1/2)	155	100*	South Africa	Pakistan	National Stadium, Karachi	1 October 2007	Won	
64	Andrew Strauss	123	108	England	India	M. A. Chidambaram Stadium, Chennai	11 December 2008	Lost	
65	Tillakaratne Dilshan	162	143	Sri Lanka	Bangladesh	Zohur Ahmed Chowdhury Stadium, Chittagong	3 January 2009	Won	
66	Phillip Hughes	115	160	Australia	South Africa	Kingsmead Cricket Ground, Durban	6 March 2009	Won	
67	Hashim Amla	114	123*	South Africa	India	Eden Gardens, Kolkata	14 February 2010	Lost	
68	Jacques Kallis (2/2)	161	109*	South Africa	India	Newlands Cricket Ground, Cape Town	2 January 2011	Drawn	
69	Kieran Powell	117	110	West Indies	Bangladesh	Sher-e-Bangla National Cricket Stadium, Dhaka	13 November 2012	Won	
70	Kumar Sangakkara (1/2)	142	105	Sri Lanka	Bangladesh	Galle International Stadium, Galle	8 March 2013	Drawn	
71	Peter Fulton	136	110	New Zealand	England	Eden Park, Auckland	22 March 2013	Drawn	
72	Brendan Taylor (1/2)	171	102*	Zimbabwe	Bangladesh	Harare Sports Club, Harare	17 April 2013	Won	
73	Kumar Sangakkara (2/2)	319	105*	Sri Lanka	Bangladesh	Zohur Ahmed Chowdhury Stadium, Chittagong	4 February 2014	Drawn	
74	David Warner (1/3)	135	145	Australia	South Africa	Newlands Cricket Ground, Cape Town	1 March 2014	Won	
75	Younis Khan	106	103*	Pakistan	Australia	Dubai International Cricket Stadium, Dubai	22 October 2014	Won	
76	Azhar Ali	109	100*	Pakistan	Australia	Sheikh Zayed Cricket Stadium, Abu Dhabi	30 October 2014	Won	
77	Misbah-ul-Haq	101	101*	Pakistan	Australia	Sheikh Zayed Cricket Stadium, Abu Dhabi	30 October 2014	Won	
78	David Warner (2/3)	145	102	Australia	India	Adelaide Oval, Adelaide	9 December 2014	Won	
79	Virat Kohli	115	141	India	Australia	Adelaide Oval, Adelaide	9 December 2014	Lost	
80	David Warner (3/3)	163	116	Australia	New Zealand	The Gabba, Brisbane	5 November 2015	Won	
81	Ajinkya Rahane	127	100*	India	South Africa	Feroz Shah Kotla Ground, Delhi	3 December 2015	Won	
82	Shai Hope	147	118*	West Indies	England	Headingley Cricket Ground, Leeds	25 August 2017	Won	
83	Mominul Haque	176	105	Bangladesh	Sri Lanka	Zohur Ahmed Chowdhury Stadium, Chittagong	31 January 2018	Drawn	
84	Brendan Taylor (2/2)	110	106*	Zimbabwe	Bangladesh	Sher-e-Bangla National Cricket Stadium, Dhaka	11 November 2018	Lost	
85	Steve Smith	144	142	Australia	England	Edgbaston Cricket Ground, Birmingham	1 August 2019	Won	
86	Rohit Sharma	176	127	India	South Africa	ACA–VDCA Cricket Stadium, Visakhapatnam	2 October 2019	Won	
87	Usman Khawaja	137	101*	Australia	England	Sydney Cricket Ground, Sydney	5 January 2022	Drawn	
88	Imam-ul-Haq	157	111*	Pakistan	Australia	Rawalpindi Cricket Stadium, Rawalpindi	4 March 2022	Drawn	
89	Jonny Bairstow	106	114*	England	India	Edgbaston Cricket Ground, Birmingham	1 July 2022	Won	
90	Marnus Labuschagne	204	104*	Australia	West Indies	Perth Stadium, Perth	30 November 2022	Won	
91	Najmul Hossain Shanto (1/2)	146	124	Bangladesh	Afghanistan	Sher-e-Bangla National Cricket Stadium, Dhaka	14 June 2023	Won	
92	Kane Williamson	118	109	New Zealand	South Africa	Bay Oval, Mount Maunganui	4 February 2024	Won	
93	Dhananjaya de Silva	102	108	Sri Lanka	Bangladesh	Sylhet International Cricket Stadium, Sylhet	22 March 2024	Won	
94	Kamindu Mendis	102	164	Sri Lanka	Bangladesh	Sylhet International Cricket Stadium, Sylhet	22 March 2024	Won	
95	Joe Root	143	103	England	Sri Lanka	Lord's, London	29 August 2024	Won	
96	Najmul Hossain Shanto (2/2)	148	125*	Bangladesh	Sri Lanka	Galle International Stadium, Galle	17 June 2025	Drawn	
97	Rishabh Pant	134	118	India	England	Headingley, Leeds	20 June 2025	Lost	
98	Shubman Gill	269	161	India	England	Edgbaston, Birmingham	2 July 2025	Won	
99	Devon Conway	227	100	New Zealand	West Indies	Bay Oval, Mount Maunganui	18 December 2025	Won	
100	Tom Latham	137	101	New Zealand	West Indies	Bay Oval, Mount Maunganui	18 December 2025	Won	
101	Sonal Dinusha	103	133*	Sri Lanka	India	SSC Cricket Ground, Colombo	23 August 2026	Drawn	

== By country ==
Occurrences of a player scoring centuries in both innings of a Test match, by country
Team	Occurrences	Players
Australia	25	18
England	13	12
West Indies	12	10
India	11	8
Pakistan	10	10
Sri Lanka	10	8
New Zealand	7	7
South Africa	6	5
Zimbabwe	4	3
Bangladesh	3	2
Total	101	83

== By player ==
Players that have scored centuries in both innings of a Test match more than once
Player	Occurrences
(India) Sunil Gavaskar	3
(Australia) Ricky Ponting	3
(Australia) David Warner	3
(Australia) Allan Border	2
(Australia) Greg Chappell	2
(Sri Lanka) Aravinda de Silva	2
(India) Rahul Dravid	2
(Australia) Matthew Hayden	2
(Cricket West Indies) George Headley	2
(South Africa) Jacques Kallis	2
(Sri Lanka) Kumar Sangakkara	2
(Bangladesh) Najmul Hossain Shanto	2
(England) Herbert Sutcliffe	2
(Zimbabwe) Brendan Taylor	2
(Cricket West Indies) Clyde Walcott	2

== Bibliography ==
- Donnelly, Paul (2010). First, Last & Only: Cricket. Octopus Publishing Group. ISBN 978-0-600-62253-6.
