= West Indian cricket team in New Zealand in 1979–80 =

International cricket tour

West Indian cricket team in New Zealand in 1979-80
	New Zealand	West Indies
- Dates: 6 February 1980 – 5 March 1980
Captains	Geoff Howarth	Clive Lloyd

Test series
- Result: New Zealand won the 3-match series 1–0
Most runs	Bruce Edgar (241); Geoff Howarth (239)	Desmond Haynes (339); Gordon Greenidge (274)
Most wickets	Richard Hadlee (19)	Joel Garner (14)

One Day International series
- Results: New Zealand won the 1-match series 1–0
Most runs	Jeremy Coney (53)	Gordon Greenidge (103)
Most wickets	Richard Hadlee (2)	Collis King (2)

The West Indies cricket team toured New Zealand from 6 February 1980 to 5 March 1980, playing 3 Tests and 1 One Day Internationals against New Zealand. The West Indies were coming after their first test series win on Australian soil. However, Vivian Richards who scored 400 runs in the Australian tour returned home with a sore back. As a result, New Zealand won the test series 1-0 as well as the only ODI by 1 wicket.

The series is remembered for West Indian complaints about the standard of umpiring, which led to a number of on-field incidents in the three Test matches. This series was the West Indies' last defeat in a Test match series until 1994–95.

== Touring team ==
The West Indies Cricket Board of Control named the 16 players to tour Australia and New Zealand on 27 September 1979.

Player	Date of birth	Batting style	Bowling style	First class team
Clive Lloyd (c)	31 August 1944	Left-hand	Right-arm medium	Guyana
Deryck Murray (vc)	20 May 1943	Right-hand	Wicket keeper	Trinidad and Tobago
Colin Croft	15 March 1953	Right-hand	Right-arm fast	Guyana
Joel Garner	16 December 1952	Right-hand	Right-arm fast	Barbados
Larry Gomes	13 July 1953	Left-hand	Right-arm offbreak	Trinidad and Tobago
Gordon Greenidge	1 May 1951	Right-hand	Right-arm medium	Barbados
Desmond Haynes	15 February 1956	Right-hand	Right-arm medium	Barbados
Michael Holding	16 February 1954	Right hand	Right arm fast	Jamaica
Alvin Kallicharran	21 March 1949	Left-hand	Right-arm offbreak	Guyana
Collis King	11 June 1951	Right-hand	Right-arm medium	Barbados
Malcolm Marshall	18 April 1958	Right-hand	Right arm fast	Barbados
David Murray	29 May 1950	Right-hand	Wicket keeper	Barbados
Derick Parry	22 December 1954	Right-hand	Right-arm offbreak	Leeward Islands
~~Viv Richards~~	~~7 March 1952~~	~~Right-hand~~	~~Right-arm offbreak~~	~~Leeward Islands~~
Andy Roberts	29 January 1951	Right-hand	Right arm fast	Leeward Islands
Lawrence Rowe	8 January 1949	Right hand	Left arm fast medium	Jamaica

== Tour matches ==
First match

3–5 February 1980
Scorecard

Northern Districts	v	West Indians
277/7d (95 overs); John Wright 68; Derick Parry 4/103 (33 overs)		377/6d (102 overs); Gordon Greenidge 116; Karl Treiber 3/81 (19 overs)
252/7d (85 overs); John Wright 84; Derick Parry 3/85 (28 overs)		132/8 (25 overs); Lawrence Rowe 39; Geoff Howarth 3/40 (7 overs)

Match drawn
Seddon Park, Hamilton
Umpires: Bruce Bricknell and John Hastie

- Northern Districts won the toss and elected to bat.
- Gordon Greenidge (West Indians) and John Wright (Northern Districts) passed 17,000 and 6,000 runs in first-class cricket respectively.
- Geoff Howarth (Northern Districts) claimed his 100th first-class wicket.

The West Indies' first game of the tour was against Northern Districts on 3 February 1980. The three-day match ended in a draw after the West Indies finished up on 132/8, chasing 153. Gordon Greenidge made 116 for the West Indies in the first innings, the only century of the match.

Second match

15 February 1980
Scorecard

Central Districts; 130 (44.4 overs)	v	West Indians; 132 (33 overs)
Matthew Toynbee 27; Andy Roberts 4/20 (9 overs)		Gordon Greenidge 64*

West Indians won by 10 wickets
Pukekura Park, New Plymouth
Umpires: David Kinsella and Graeme Reardon
Player of the match: Andy Roberts (WI)

- Toss not known

Third match

16-18 February 1980
Scorecard

West Indians	v	Wellington
102 (43.3 overs); Collis King 27; Ewen Chatfield 6/33 (18 overs)		93 (32.2 overs); John Morrison 16; Malcolm Marshall 5/43 (16 overs)
143 (37.4 overs); Desmond Haynes 58; Ewen Chatfield 7/53 (17.4 overs)		155/4 (59.1 overs); Jeremy Coney 69*; Malcolm Marshall 2/40 (17 overs)

Wellington won by 6 wickets
Hutt Recreation Ground, Lower Hutt
Umpires: Ralph Gardiner and David Kinsella
Player of the match: Ewen Chatfield

- Wellington won the toss and decided to field
- This was Wellington's first win over a foreign first-class team since beating the Marylebone Cricket Club in 1935

== One-day international ==
The only limited overs match of the series was held on 6 February 1980. A close game, New Zealand won by 1 wicket with two balls remaining.

6 February 1980
Scorecard

West Indies; 203/7 (50 overs)	v	New Zealand; 207/9 (49.4 overs)
Gordon Greenidge 103 (137); Richard Hadlee 2/28 (10 overs)		Jeremy Coney 53* (65); Derick Parry 3/47 (10 overs)

New Zealand won by 1 wicket
Lancaster Park, Christchurch
Umpires: Fred Goodall and Robert Monteith
Player of the match: Richard Hadlee (NZ)

- New Zealand won the toss and elected to field.
- Paul McEwan and John F. Reid (both NZ) made their ODI debuts.

== Test series summary ==
=== First Test ===
8 – 13 February 1980
(5–day match)
Scorecard

West Indies	v	New Zealand
140 (69.5 overs); Desmond Haynes 55 (208); Richard Hadlee 5/34 (20 overs)		249 (95.5 overs); Bruce Edgar 65 (226); Colin Croft 4/64 (25 overs)
212 (108.4 overs); Desmond Haynes 105 (323); Richard Hadlee 6/68 (36 overs)		104/9 (50 overs); Lance Cairns 19 (43); Joel Garner 4/36 (23 overs)

New Zealand won by 1 wicket
Carisbrook, Dunedin
Umpires: Fred Goodall and John Hastie

- West Indies won the toss and elected to bat.
- 11 February was taken as a rest day.
- Peter Webb (NZ) made his Test debut.

The First Test was scheduled over 8–13 February. The West Indies won the toss and elected to bat, where they made 140, Richard Hadlee taking 5-34 for New Zealand. New Zealand, braving the West Indies' renowned four-man pace attack, made 249 in their innings, a lead of 109. 105 from Desmond Haynes ensured New Zealand had to bat again, but the target of 104 appeared to be too little for the West Indies to defend. Nevertheless, determined bowling by the West Indies took the game to the wire, with New Zealand at one stage reduced to 54/7. New Zealand eventually won by one wicket after their number 10 and 11 batsmen scored the winning runs off a leg bye. The exciting finish was overshadowed, however, by West Indian complaints of poor umpiring throughout the match. Michael Holding had kicked the stumps in frustration after having an appeal turned down in New Zealand's second innings, an action which was assured of worldwide attention when it was captured by a newspaper photographer at the grounds. After the match, the West Indies' manager, Willie Rodriguez, complained, "We got two men out and they were not given. They were atrocious decisions."

The West Indies then played their next tour match against Wellington (see above) on 16 February. The low-scoring game was won by Wellington by 6 wickets.

=== Second Test ===
22 – 27 February 1980
(5–day match)
Scorecard

West Indies	v	New Zealand
228 (89.3 overs); Gordon Greenidge 91 (236); Lance Cairns 6/85 (32 overs)		460 (130.4 overs); Geoff Howarth 147 (261); Alvin Kallicharran 2/16 (6.4 overs)
447/5d (119 overs); Desmond Haynes 122 (199); Gary Troup 2/84 (27 overs)

Match drawn
Lancaster Park, Christchurch
Umpires: Fred Goodall and Steve Woodward

- New Zealand won the toss and elected to field.
- 25 February was taken as a rest day.

The Second Test was held over 22–27 February. The match ended in a draw with the West Indies on 447/5 in their second innings, a lead of 215 after having been behind by 232 in the first innings. The match was more renowned for tensions between the West Indians and the New Zealand umpires coming to a head. At tea on the third day, the West Indies refused to return to the field until the New Zealand umpire Fred Goodall was replaced. After being convinced by New Zealand captain Geoff Howarth to return to the field, the West Indians resumed play after a 12-minute delay. Nevertheless, the West Indians began packing their bags after the day's play with the apparent intention of abandoning the Test and series and returning home. This option was forbidden, however, by the chairman of the West Indian Cricket Board, Jeff Stollmeyer. On the fourth day, West Indian anger again spilled over when bowler Colin Croft shoulder-barged Goodall in his run-up; when Goodall complained to Lloyd, Lloyd made Goodall walk up to him by not moving from his position in the slips. Croft and Lloyd maintained after the series that the shoulder-barging had been an accident, although New Zealand captain Howarth disputed this.

=== Third Test ===
29 February – 5 March 1980
(5–day match)
Scorecard

West Indies	v	New Zealand
220 (84.2 overs); Lawrence Rowe 50 (124); Gary Troup 4/71 (31.2 overs)		305 (128.2 overs); Bruce Edgar 127 (317); Joel Garner 6/56 (36.2 overs)
264/9d (94.1 overs); Gordon Greenidge 74 (219); Gary Troup 6/95 (29.1 overs)		73/4 (36 overs); John Wright 23 (83); Alvin Kallicharran 1/0 (4 overs)

Match drawn
Eden Park, Auckland
Umpires: Ralph Gardiner and John Hastie

- New Zealand won the toss and elected to field.
- The match was scheduled for five days but extended to six, by playing on the scheduled rest day.
- There was no play on the third day.
- Paul McEwan (NZL) made his Test debut.

The third and final Test of the series was held over 29 February to 5 March. Again ending in a draw, New Zealand were left on 73/4 chasing 180 at stumps on the fifth day. While not reaching the heights of the Second Test, the match was still marred by some controversy when four senior West Indian players indicated that they would be catching flights home at lunch on the final day, substitute fielders taking their places for the remaining sessions. The players involved were persuaded out of this action.

== Aftermath ==
What was from a spectator's perspective a remarkable series—a closely fought 1-0 victory by lowly New Zealand against the then unofficial cricket world champions—was marred by acrimony and complaints from the teams involved. The West Indies maintained their bitterness towards the umpiring after the series, with Rodriguez complaining that the umpiring had not been biased so much as incompetent and that the West Indies had been "set up; that there was no way we could win a Test." Lloyd later conceded, however, that he should have taken a firmer line with his players and that some of the incidents had not been in the best interests of the game. New Zealand's Goodall, however—the principal target of the West Indies' anger—compounded the bitterness by allegedly making racist comments about the West Indies at an after-dinner speech following the series.

Cricket-wise, the series was a watershed for both teams—the West Indies would go on to establish a record unbeaten run in Test match series until 1994–95, while the victory heralded the emergence of New Zealand's best Test team.

== External sources ==
Cricinfo tour directory
