= List of New Zealand first-class cricket records =

This is a list of New Zealand first-class cricket records; that is, record team and individual performances in first-class cricket for Auckland, Canterbury, Central Districts, Northern Districts, Otago, and Wellington, teams representing New Zealand (at various levels), both in New Zealand and overseas, and other first-class teams in New Zealand.

== Team records ==
=== Highest innings total ===
- 777 Canterbury v Otago at Christchurch 1996/97
- 752-8d New South Wales v Otago at Dunedin 1923/24
- 726 Northern Districts v Canterbury at Rangiora 2009/10
- 693-9d Auckland v Canterbury at Auckland 1939/40
- 680–8 New Zealand v India at Wellington 2013/14
- 671–4 New Zealand v Sri Lanka at Wellington 1990/91
- 663 Australia v New Zealand at Auckland 1920/21

Auckland	Canterbury	Central Districts	Northern Districts	Otago	Wellington
693-9d v (C) 1939/40	777 v (O) 1996/97	594-8d v (A) 1995/96	726 v (C) 2009/10	651-9d v (W) 2012/13	614–8 v (C) 2006/07
662/5 v (CD) 2008/09	613-7d v (W) 2006/07	549-8d v (C) 1998/99	614–7 v (A) 2012/13	642-6d v (CD) 2021/22	608-9d v (ND) 1998/99
658-9d v (W) 2012/13	559 v (CD) 1993/94	542-4d v (C) 2002/03	608–9 v (W) 2011/12	624 v (CD) 2006/07	595 v (A) 1927/28

=== Lowest innings totals ===
- 13 Auckland v Canterbury at Auckland 1877/78
- 19 Wellington v Nelson at Nelson 1885/86
- 22 Wellington v Canterbury at Wellington 1903/04
- 25 Canterbury v Otago at Christchurch 1866/67
- 26 New Zealand v England at Auckland 1954/55

Auckland	Canterbury	Central Districts	Northern Districts	Otago	Wellington
13 v (C) 1877/78	25 v (O) 1886/87	50 v (W) 1979/80	32 v (A) 1996/97	34 v (W) 1956/57	19 v (N) 1885/86
48 v (O) 1889/90	27 v (O) 1896/87	51 v (ND) 1957/58	52 v (C) 1966/67	35 v (A) 1884/85	22 v (A) 1903/04
48 v (W) 1889/90	32 v (O) 1866/67	59 v (A) 1958/59	57 v (W) 1961/62	36 v (NSW) 1889/90	29 v (N) 1879/80

Note: (N)=Nelson, (NSW)=New South Wales

=== Highest fourth innings totals ===
495	lost by 145 runs	Otago v Wellington	Dunedin	1923/24
475–4	won	Wellington v Canterbury	Christchurch	1994/95
473–6	won	Canterbury v Auckland	Christchurch	1930/31
458	lost by 276 runs	Auckland v Wellington	Wellington	1927/28
453–8	won	Northern Districts v Wellington	Wellington	1995/96
451	lost by 98 runs	New Zealand v England	Christchurch	2001/02
450/7	won	Central Districts v Canterbury	New Plymouth	2008/09

=== Largest victories ===
==== By an innings and ====
- 365 runs Sims' Australian XI defeated Canterbury at Christchurch 1913/14
- 358 runs Australia defeated NZ at Wellington 1904/05 (not a test)
- 356 runs Australia defeated Otago at Dunedin 1949/50

==== By runs ====
- 512 runs Wellington defeated Auckland at Wellington 1925/26
- 446 runs Wellington defeated Otago at Wellington 1926/27
- 438 runs Auckland defeated Wellington at Auckland 1934/35

=== Tied matches ===
- Wellington v Nelson at Wellington 1883/84
- NZ v T.N. Pearce's XI at Scarborough 1958
- Central Districts v England XI at New Plymouth 1977/78
- Victoria v NZ at Melbourne 1982/83
- Wellington v Canterbury at Wellington 1988/89

=== Close finishes ===
==== Victory by 1 wicket ====
(29 instances) most recent

- Central Districts defeated Canterbury at New Plymouth 2009/10
- Northern Districts defeated Central Districts at Napier 2004/05

==== Victory by runs ====
- 1 run Northern Districts defeated Central Districts at Rotorua 1989/90
- 2 runs Auckland defeated Canterbury at Auckland 1903/04
- 2 runs Wellington defeated Canterbury Wellington 1935/36
- 3 Runs (5 instances)

=== Victory after following on ===
1st Innings	2nd & 3rd Innings	4th Innings	Winner		
Canterbury 392	Auckland 180 & 302	Canterbury 84	Auckland by 6 runs	at Auckland	1952/53
Otago 320-9d	Northern Districts 165 & 275	Otago 105	ND by 15 runs	at Dunedin	1961/62
Northern Districts 224	Auckland 69 & 303	Northern Districts 140	Auckland by 8 runs	at Auckland	1963/64
Auckland 351-9d	Canterbury 166 & 360	Auckland 149	Canterbury by 26 runs	at Christchurch	1973/74
Otago 268	Auckland 101 & 278	Otago 108	Auckland by 3 runs	at Dunedin	2004/05

== Batting records ==
=== Most runs, most centuries, highest averages in NZ domestic first-class cricket (20+ innings). ===
Players in bold are still active.

Most Runs		Most Centuries		Highest Average†	
M.S. Sinclair	13,717	M.S. Sinclair	32	G.A. Hick (ND)	79.03
M.H.W. Papps	12,294	M.H.W. Papps	32	M.D. Crowe (CD)	68.72
B. A. Edgar	11,304	C.D. Cumming	23	V.J. Scott (A)	60.10
P.G. Fulton	10,569	M.D. Crowe	22	B. Sutcliffe (O)	59.09
**J.A. Raval**	9959	**J.A. Raval**	22	C.Z. Harris (C)	57.89
M.D. Bell	9881	M.D. Bell	22	C. Munro (A)	58.23
C.D. Cumming	9142	D.R. Flynn	21	A.H. Jones (W)	53.17
D.R. Flynn	7815	T.G. McIntosh	19	C.F.K. van Wyk (CD)	52.85
L.J. Woodcock	7811	G.R. Hay	18	J.G. Myburgh (C)	51.71
J.A.H Marshall	7422	P.J. Ingram	17	M.S. Sinclair (CD)	51.68

=== Most runs, most centuries for each NZ domestic first-class cricket team. ===
Most Runs		Most Centuries	
T.G. McIntosh (A)	5980	T.G. McIntosh (A)	17
P.G. Fulton (C)	8719	M.H.W. Papps (C)	19
M.S. Sinclair (CD)	9148	M.S. Sinclair (CD)	27
J.A.H. Marshall (ND)	6418	D.R. Flynn (ND)	20
C.D. Cumming (O)	6589	C.D. Cumming (O)	21
L.J. Woodcock (W)	7719	M.D. Bell (W)	20

- T.G. McIntosh has played the most matches for Auckland: 102
- W.K. Lees has played the most matches for Otago: 108

=== Highest innings ===
- 385 Bert Sutcliffe Otago v Canterbury at Christchurch 1952/53
- 355 Bert Sutcliffe Otago v Auckland at Dunedin 1949/50
- 345 Tom Bruce Central Districts v Auckland at Auckland 2024/25
- 338* Roger Blunt Otago v Canterbury at Christchurch 1931/32
- 336* Wally Hammond England v New Zealand at Auckland 1932/33
- 334 Dean Brownlie Northern Districts v Central Districts at New Plymouth 2014/15
- 327* Devon Conway Wellington v Canterbury at Wellington 2019/20
- 317 Ken Rutherford New Zealand v D.B.Close XI at Scarborough 1986
- 316* Michael Papps Wellington v Auckland at Wellington 2017/18
- 306 Mark Richardson New Zealand v Zimbabwe A at Kwekwe 2000/01
- 302 Brendon McCullum New Zealand v India at Wellington 2013/14
- 301 Peter Fulton Canterbury v Auckland at Christchurch 2002/2003
- 299 Martin Crowe New Zealand v Sri Lanka at Wellington 1990/91

Auckland	Canterbury	Central Districts	Northern Districts	Otago	Wellington
290 W.N. Carson v (O) 1936/37	301* P.G. Fulton v (A) 2002/03	345 T. Bruce v (A) 2024/25	334 D. Brownlie v (CD) 2014/15	**385** B. Sutcliffe	327* D.P. Conway v (C) 2019/20
269* C. Munro v (W) 2012/13	261 T.W.M. Latham v (CD) 2013/14	247 P.J. Ingram v (ND) 2008/09	284* K.S. Williamson v (W) 2011/12	355 B. Sutcliffe	316* M.H.W. Papps v (A) 2017/18
268 T. McIntosh v (C) 2007/08	251* C.Z. Harris v (CD) 1996/97	245* P.J. Ingram v (W) 2009/10	241 D.R. Flynn v (O) 2010/11	338* R.C.Blunt	296 J.R. Reid v (ND) 1962/63

=== Highest partnerships ===
First wicket

- 432 M.H.W. Papps & L.J. Woodcock, Wellington v Auckland at Wellington 2017/18
- 428 P.J. Ingram & J.M. How, Central Districts v Wellington at Wellington 2009/10
- 387 G.M. Turner & T.W. Jarvis, NZ v West Indies at Georgetown 1971/72

Second wicket

- 317 R.T Hart & P.S. Briasco, Central Districts v Canterbury at New Plymouth 1983/84
- 315* H.H. Gibbs & J.H. Kallis, South Africa v NZ at Christchurch 1998/99
- 303 C.S. Dempster & C.F.W. Allcott, NZ v Warwickshire at Birmingham 1927

Third wicket

- 467 A.H. Jones & M.D. Crowe, NZ v Sri Lanka at Wellington 1990/91
- 445 P.E. Whitelaw & W.N. Carson, Auckland v Otago at Dunedin 1936/37
- 394* P.G. Kennedy & R.T. Latham, Canterbury v Northern Districts at Rotorua 1990/91

Fourth wicket

- 350 Mushtaq Mohammad & Asif Iqbal, Pakistan v NZ at Dunedin 1972/73
- 324 J.R. Reid & W.M. Wallace, NZ v Cambridge University Cambridge 1949
- 310 J.D. Ryder & N.R. Parlane, Wellington v Central Districts at Palmerston North 2004/05

Fifth wicket

- 347* M.J. Horne & A.C. Barnes, Auckland v Northern Districts at Auckland 2003/04
- 341 G.R. Larsen & E.B. McSweeney, Wellington v Central Districts at Levin 1987/88
- 319 K.R. Rutherford & E.J. Gray, NZ v DB Close's XI at Scarbourough 1986

Sixth wicket

- 379* S.L. Stewart & C.F.K. van Wyk, Canterbury v Central Districts at New Plymouth 2009/10
- 377 C. Munro & Craig Cachopa, Auckland v Wellington at Auckland 2012/13
- 352 B.J. Watling & B.B. McCullum, New Zealand v India at Wellington 2013/14

Seventh wicket

- 265 J.L. Powell & N. Dorreen, Canterbury v Otago at Christchurch 1929/30
- 261 A.D.R. Campbell & P.A. Strang, Zimbabwe v Canterbury at Timaru 1997/98
- 250 C.J. Nevin & M.D.J. Walker, Wellington v Otago at Wellington 2003/04

Eighth wicket

- 433 V.T. Trumper & A. Sims, Sim's Australian XI v Canterbury at Christchurch 1913/14
- 256 S.P. Fleming & J.E.C. Franklin, NZ v South Africa at Cape Town 2005/06
- 253 N.J Astle & A.C. Parore, NZ v Australia at Perth 2001/02

Ninth wicket

- 239 H.B. Cave & I.B. Leggat, Central Districts v Otago at Dunedin 1952/53
- 225 L.J. Woodcock & M.J. Tugaga, Wellington v Central Districts at Wellington 2009/10
- 209 P.J. Wiseman & B.P. Martin, New Zealand A v Sri Lanka A at Christchurch 2003/04

Tenth wicket

- 184 R.C. Blunt & W. Hawksworth, Otago v Canterbury at Christchurch 1931/32
- 160 L.K. Germon & W.A. Wisneski, Canterbury v Northern Districts at Rangiora 1997/98
- 151 B.F. Hastings & R.O. Collinge, NZ v Pakistan at Auckland 1972/73

	Auckland	Canterbury	Central Districts	Northern Districts	Otago	Wellington
1st	286 B. Sutcliffe & D.D. Taylor v (C) 1948/49	306 L.A.Cuff & J.D. Lawrence v (A) 1893/94	428 P.J. Ingram & J.M. How, v (W) 2009/10	274 B.S. Wilson & B.J. Watling v (CD) 2010/11	373 B. Sutcliffe & L. Watt v (A) 1950/51	432 M.H.W. Papps & L.J. Woodcock v (A) 2017/18
2nd	241 T.J. Franklin & J.J. Crowe v (W) 1988/89	243 M.H.W. Papps & J.G. Myburgh v (CD) 2007/08	317 R.T Hart & P.S. Briasco v (C) 1983/84	301 D.R. Flynn & B.S. Wilson v (A) 2012/13	254 K.J. Burns & K.R. Rutherford v (W) 1987/88	287 M.D. Bell & J.D. Wells v (A) 1997/98
3rd	445 P.E. Whitelaw & W.N. Carson v (O) 1936/37	394* P.G. Kennedy & R.T. Latham v (ND) 1990/91	264 P.J.Ingram & M.S. Sinclair v (ND) 2008/09	261* M.P. Maynard & S.A. Thomson v (A) 1990/91	306 S.B. Haig v N.T. Broom (CD) 2009/10	346 G.P. Burnett v R.A. Verry (ND) 1991/92
4th	280 J.J. Crowe & D.N. Patel v (ND) 1991/92	278 M.L. Page & A.W. Roberts v (W) 1931/32	276* M.D. Crowe & P.S. Briasco v (C) 1986/87	283 D.R. Flynn & C.J. Anderson v (0) 2012/13	235 K.J. Burns & R.N. Hoskin v (ND) 1987/88	310 J.D. Ryder & N.R. Parlane v (CD) 2004/05
5th	347* M.J. Horne & A.C. Barnes v (ND) 2003/04	290 G.R. Stead & C.Z. Harris v (CD) 1996/97	301 J.I Englefield & R.L. Taylor v (W) 2004/05	155* J.A.H. Marshall & N.K.W. Horsley v (C) 2005/06	266 B. Sutcliffe & W.S. Haig v (A) 1952/53	341 G.R. Larsen & E.B. McSweeney (CD) 1987/88
6th	377 C. Munro & Craig Cachopa, v (W)2012/13	379* S.L. Stewart & C.F.K. van Wyk v (CD) 2009/10	235 M.S. Sinclair & B.B.J. Griggs v (W) 2008/09	322 M.G. Orchard & J.A.F. Yovich v (CD) 2005/06	256 N Kelly & M Chu v (CD) 2021/22	226 E.J. Gray & R.W. Ormiston v (CD) 1981/82
7th	224 V.J. Scott & A.M. Matheson v (C) 1937/38	265 J.L. Powell & N. Dorreen v (O) 1929/30	219 B.W. Yuile & B.L. Hampton v (C) 1967/68	136 D.J. Nash & A.R. Tait v (CD) 1997/98	182 B. Sutcliffe & A.W. Gilbertson v (C) 1952/53	250 C.J. Nevin & M.D.J. Walker v (O) 2003/04
8th	189 W.N. Carson & A.M. Matheson v (W) 1938/39	220 P.J. Wiseman & B.C. Hiini v (ND) 2005/06	173 I.D.S. Smith & G.K. Robertson v(ND) 192/83	163 P.D. McGlashan & G.W. Aldrige v (C) 2008/09	165* J.N. Crawford & A.G. Eckhold v (W) 1914/15	180 R.G. Twose & M.C. Goodson v (O) 1994/95
9th	151 R.A. Young & G.J. Morgan v (ND) 2007/08	182* L.K. Germon & R.M. Ford v (W) 1989/90	239 H.B. Cave & I.B. Leggat v (O) 1952/53	188 N.R. Parlane & D.R. Tuffey v (W) 1999/2000	208 W.C. McSkimming & B.E. Scott v (A) 2004/05	225 L.J. Woodcock & M.J. Tugaga v (CD) 2009/10
10th	119 W.N. Carson & J. Cowie v (W) 1937/38	160 L.K. Germon & W.A. Wisneski v (ND) 1997/98	133 G.A Bartlett & I.A. Colquuhoun v (A) 1959/60	113* P.D. McGlashan & G.W. Aldridge v (W) 2005/06	184 R.C. Blunt & W. Hawksworth v (C) 1931/32	138 K.C. James & A.W.S. Brice v (W) 1926/27

=== Most runs and highest average in a season ===
Most Runs in a Season									Highest average in a Season†								
		M	I	NO	HS	Runs	Ave	100s			M	I	NO	HS	Runs	Ave	100s
M.D. Crowe	1986/87	11	21	3	175*	1676	93.11	8	W.R. Hammond (E)	1932/33	3	3	1	336*	621	310.50	2
P.G. Fulton	2012/13	12	23	2	136	1249	59.47	5	W.M. Woodfull (V)	1924/25	6	9	5	212*	710	177.50	2
G.M. Turner	1975/76	11	20	4	177*	1244	77.75	5	M.J. Greatbatch	1995/96	5	6	2	220	623	155.75	4
G.A. Hick	1988/89	8	16	3	211*	1228	94.46	6	Javid Miandad (P)	1988/89	4	5	1	271	597	149.25	3
M.D. Bell	2001/02	13	21	0	134	1092	52.00	6	C.Z. Harris	1996/97	5	7	1	251*	835	139.16	3
H.D. Rutherford	2012/13	13	23	0	171	1077	46.82	2	W.M. Woodfull (OZ)	1927/28	6	9	3	284*	781	130.16	3
J.J. Crowe	1991/92	10	19	2	142*	1063	62.52	4	W.N. Carson	1936/37	3	4	0	290	500	125.00	2
D.G. Brownlie	2012/13	16	28	2	142*	1057	40.65	4	W. Bardsley (NSW)	1923/24	6	7	2	200*	623	124.60	1
R.H. Vance	1988/89	10	18	2	254*	1037	64.81	4	D.J. Cullinan (SA)	1998/99	5	7	2	275*	553	110.60	3
M.H. Richardson	2000/01	11	19	2	166	1035	60.88	2	J.S. Hiddleston (W)	1925/26	3	5	0	212	537	107.40	2
J.G. Wright	1986/87	11	21	2	192	1019	53.63	3	C. Munro	2012/13	4	6	1	269*	623	124.60	3
M.H.W. Papps	2006/07	7	11	0	188	1005	91.36	4	K.S. Williamson	2011/12	5	7	2	284*	517	103.40	2
M.S. Sinclair	1999/2000	14	26	2	214	1004	41.83	3									
B. Popli	2015/16	10	17	0	172	1149	67.58	3									

Note: (E)=England, (V)=Victoria, (P)=Pakistan (OZ)=Australia (NSW)=New South Wales (SA)=South Africa (W)=Wellington

† more than 500 runs

=== Most centuries in a season ===
- 8 M.D Crowe 1986/87
- 6 E. de C. Weekes (WI) 1955/56
- 6 G.A. Hick 1988/89
- 6 M.D. Bell 2000/01
- 5 G.M. Turner 1975/76
- 5 P.G. Fulton 2012/13

(22 players have scored 4 centuries in a Season)

=== Two centuries in a match ===
(37 instances)

Most Times		One Double Century & One Century				
B. Sutcliffe	4 times	B. Sutcliffe	243 & 100*	NZ v Essex	at Southend	1949
G.M. Turner	3 times	G.S. Chappell	247* & 133	Australia v NZ	at Wellington	1973/74
M.D.Crowe	2 times	M.J. Horne	118 & 209*	Auckland v Northern Districts	at Auckland	2003/04
P.J.Ingram	2 times					

(Only Arthur Fagg has ever scored 2 double-centuries in a match 244 & 202*, Kent v Essex at Colchester, 1938)

=== Most runs in a career ===
Most of the players on this list scored a lot of their runs for overseas teams. Where this is the case the number of runs and the names of the teams are included. Players in bold are still active.

	M	Inn	NO	HS	Runs	Ave	100s	
G.M.Turner	455	792	101	311*	34346	49.70	103	22298 runs for Worcestershire
J.G.Wright	366	636	44	192	25073	42.35	59	10638 runs for Derbyshire
M.D. Crowe	247	412	62	299	19608	56.02	71	3948 runs for Somerset
B. Sutcliffe	233	407	39	385	17447	47.41	44	
G.P.Howarth	338	584	42	183	17294	31.90	32	9284 runs for Surrey
J.R. Reid	246	418	28	296	16128	41.35	39	
S.P.Fleming	247	406	32	274*	16409	43.87	35	4390 runs for Middlesex, Nottinghamshire & Yorkshire
D.N.Patel	358	558	51	204	15188	29.95	26	9734 runs for Worcestershire
K.R. Rutherford	220	383	33	317	13974	39.92	35	3026 runs for Gauteng & Transvaal
M.S. Sinclair	188	319	37	268	13717	48.64	36	
B.E. Congdon	241	416	40	202*	13101	34.84	23	
C.M. Spearman	201	360	16	341	13021	37.85	30	6970 runs for Gloucestershire
**H.J.H. Marshall**	264	434	29	170	14820	36.59	31	7000+ runs for Gloucestershire
R.E. Hitchcock	323	519	71	153*	12473	27.84	13	12269 runs for Warwickshire
M.H.W Papps	188	344	26	316*	12294	38.66	33	
C.C.R. Dacre	269	439	20	223	12230	29.18	24	8271 runs for Gloucestershire
C.S. Dempster	184	306	36	212	12145	44.98	35	4659 runs for Leicestershire
R.J. Hadlee	342	473	93	210*	12052	31.71	14	6014 runs for Nottinghamshire & Tasmania

=== Best average in a career ===
Qualification: More than 3000 runs. Players in bold are still active.

	Matches	Innings	Not Out	High Score	Runs	Average
M.D. Crowe	247	412	62	299	19608	56.02
**C. Munro**	46	71	4	281	3529	52.67
V.J. Scott	80	130	17	204	5620	49.73
G.M.Turner	455	792	101	311*	34346	49.70
**K.S. Williamson**	123	212	17	284	9516	48.80
M.S. Sinclair	188	319	37	268	13717	48.64
M.P. Donelly	131	221	26	208*	9250	47.60
B. Sutcliffe	223	407	39	385	17447	47.41
C.Z. Harris	131	204	42	251*	7377	45.53
C.S. Dempster	184	306	36	212	12145	44.98

=== Redpath Cup – Won most times ===
The Redpath Cup is awarded to the best batsman in a season for performances in first-class cricket.

- 6 times Bert Sutcliffe
- 6 times Kane Williamson
- 5 times John Reid
- 4 times Stewie Dempster
- 4 times Glenn Turner
- 4 times Martin Crowe
- 3 times Lawrie Miller
- 3 times Graham Dowling
- 3 times Geoff Howarth
- 3 times Ross Taylor

== Bowling records ==
=== Most wickets for one province ===
		Matches	Wickets	Runs	Average	5WI	10WM	Best in Innings	Best in Match
E.J. Chatfield	Wellington	84	403	7531	18.68	23	7	8–24	13–86
S.L. Boock	Otago	88	399	8235	20.63	28	7	8–57	15–104
D.R. O'Sullivan	Central Districts	90	392	9560	24.38	21	3	6–40	10–80
E.J. Gray	Wellington	120	357	9778	27.38	13	3	8–37	14–151
G.W. Aldridge	Northern Districts	119	355	10052	28.32	14	1	6-41	11-145
M.R. Gillespie	Wellington	82	344	9389	27.29	16	2	6–38	11-148
H.J. Howarth	Auckland	80	332	7361	22.17	18	4	8–75	14–94
R.W. Blair	Wellington	59	330	5004	15.16	30	10	9–72	14–136
M.W. Priest	Canterbury	88	290	8501	29.31	12	3	9–95	12–162
A.D. Downes	Otago	44	287	3902	13.59	33	13	8–35	14–103
R.J. Hadlee	Canterbury	62	285	4600	16.14	19	2	7–49	12–81
A.M. Moir	Otago	54	282	5926	21.01	20	5	8–37	15–203
C.W. Dickeson	Northern Districts	90	282	8242	29.22	9	2	7–79	11–142

=== Best bowling in a match ===
- 16–130 A.R. Tait Northern Districts v Auckland at Hamilton 1996/97
- 15–60 S.T. Callaway Canterbury v Hawkes Bay at Napier 1903/04
- 15–94 F.H. Cooke Otago v Canterbury at Christchurch 1882/83
- 15–104 S.L Boock Otago v Auckland at Dunedin 1989/90
- 15–123 R.J. Hadlee New Zealand v Australia at Brisbane 1985/86

Auckland	Canterbury	Central Districts	Northern Districts	Otago	Wellington
14–63 A.W. Rees v (O) 1889/89	15–60 S.T. Callaway v (HB) 1903/04	13–64 H.B. Cave v (A) 1952/53	16–130 A.R. Tait v (A) 1996/97	15–94 F.H. Cooke v (C) 1882/83	14–136 R.W. Blair v (C) 1956/57
14–65 J.A. Hayes v (W) 1957/58	15–168 D.J. McBeath v (A) 1918/19	11–99 D.D. Beard v (O) 1956/57	13–99 R.P. de Groen v (O) 1992/93	15–104 S.L. Boock v (A) 1989/90	14–151 E.J. Gray v (C) 1985/86
14–94 H.J. Howarth v (O) 1973/74	14–59 R.J. Read v (S) 1920/21	11–115 M.J. Mason v (C) 2002/03	12–55 B.P. Martin v (A) 1999/00	15–203 A.M. Moir v (CD) 1953/54	13–58 I.J. Salmon v (N) 1873/74

Note: (HB)=Hawkes Bay, (S)=Southland, (N)=Nelson

=== Four Wickets with Consecutive Balls ===
- A.D. Downes Otago v Auckland at Dunedin 1893/94
- N. Wagner Otago v Wellington at Queenstown 2010/11†

†Wagner took five wickets in one over.

=== Hat Tricks ===
(38 Instances)

=== Best bowling in an innings ===
- 10–28 A.E Moss Canterbury v Wellington at Christchurch 1889/90
- 9–13 P.J. Wiseman Canterbury v Central Districts at Christchurch 2004/05
- 9–36 A.F. Wensley Auckland v Otago at Auckland 1929/30
- 9–47 T.H. Dent Hawkes Bay v Wellington at Napier 1900/01
- 9–48 A.R. Tait Northern Districts v Auckland at Hamilton 1996/97
- 9–52 R.J. Hadlee New Zealand v Australia at Brisbane 1985/86
- 9–55 R.J. Hadlee New Zealand v West Zone at Rajkot 1988/89

Auckland	Canterbury	Central Districts	Northern Districts	Otago	Wellington
9–36 A.F. Wensley v (O) 1929/30	10–28 A.E. Moss v (W) 1889/90	9–100 B.W. Yuile v (C) 1965/66	9–48 A.R. Tait v (A) 1996/97	9–50 A.H. Fisher v (Q) 1896/97	9–67 A.W.S. Brice v (A) 1918/19
9–75 R. Neill v (C) 1891/92	9–13 P.J. Wiseman v (CD) 1996/97	7–28 B.W. Yuile v (ND) 1967/68	8–21 M.C. Langdon v (A) 1963/64	9–72 F.H. Cooke v (C) 1884/85	9–72 R.W. Blair v (W) 1956/57
9–86 R. Neill v (C) 1897/98	9–56 D.J. McBeath v (A) 1918/19	7–31 H.B. Cave v (A) 1952/53	8–27 T.G. Southee v (W) 2009/10	9–93 P.J. Petherick v (ND) 1975/76	9–75 R.W. Blair v (C) 1956/57

Note (Q)=Queensland, (NZ-23)=NZ under 23 XI

=== Most wickets in a season ===
		Matches	Wickets	Runs	Ave	5WI	10WM	Best
S.L. Boock	1977/78	13	66	1088	16.48	6	0	7–57
R.J. Hadlee	1986/87	11	62	935	15.08	8	1	7–79
R.J. Hadlee	1981/82	10	59	867	14.69	7	0	6–26
S.L. Boock	1978/79	12	58	1238	21.34	4	1	8–59
G.J. Thompson	1902/03	7	57	668	11.71	6	3	8–124
S.L. Boock	1986/87	10	55	920	16.72	6	1	6–62
S.T. Calloway	1903/04	5	54	474	8.77	8	4	8–33
R.W. Blair	1956/57	8	53	784	14.79	6	4	9–72
A.R. Tait	1996/97	9	53	865	16.32	4	1	9–48
C.J. Drum	2001/02	9	53	827	15.60	3	2	6–34
C.S. Martin	2003/04	12	53	1144	21.58	6	1	6–76

=== Most wickets in a career ===
Most of the players high on this list took a lot of their wickets for overseas teams. Where this is the case the number of wickets and the names of the teams are included.

	M	Wkts	Runs	Ave	
R.J. Hadlee	342	1490	26998	18.11	622 wickets for Nottinghamshire, 13 for Tasmania
C.V. Grimmett †	248	1424	31740	22.11	1402 wickets for various Australian teams
S.G. Smith ‡	211	955	17272	18.08	502 wickets for Northamptonshire, 190 for West Indian teams
T.L. Pritchard	200	818	19062	23.30	695 wickets for Warwickshire
J.S. Patel	243	698	24148	34.59	300+ wickets for Warwickshire
A.R. Adams	173	692	16577	23.95	400+ wickets for Nottinghamshire & Essex
D.N. Patel	358	654	21737	33.23	357 wickets for Worcestershire
C.L. Cairns	217	647	18322	28.31	241 wickets for Nottinghamshire
S.L. Boock	164	640	14314	22.36	
C.S. Martin	192	599	19070	31.83	
E.J. Chatfield	157	587	13429	22.87	
N. Wagner	137	568	15473	27.24	
D.L. Vettori	174	565	17981	31.82	
J.V. Saunders §	107	553	12065	21.81	472 wickets for various Australian teams
R.W. Blair	119	537	9961	18.54	
W.E. Merritt	125	536	13669	25.50	151 wickets for Northamptonshire
R.O. Collinge	163	524	12793	24.41	
D.R. O'Sullivan	136	523	13554	25.91	84 wickets for Hampshire
J.G. Bracewell	149	522	13919	26.66	
R.C. Motz	142	518	11769	22.72	
J.C. Alabaster	143	500	12688	25.37	

†Grimmett was born in Dunedin, grew up in NZ, played the first 9 matches of his career for Wellington, and then moved to Australia.

‡Smith was born in Trinidad, played for West Indian teams for the first 5 years of his career, then played for Northamptonshire and West Indian teams for 10 years, and finally played for NZ teams for the last 12 years of his career. Died in Auckland.

§ Saunders was born in Melbourne. Played for Australian teams from 1899 to 1910. Played for Wellington for the last 5 years of his career. Played 1 match for NZ. Died in Melbourne.

=== Best average in a career ===
Qualification: More than 200 wickets.

	Matches	Wickets	Runs	Average	Career
A.D. Downes	51	311	4564	14.67	1888/89-1913/14
E.F. Upham	49	265	4414	16.65	1892/93-1909/10
S.T.Callaway	62	320	5460	17.06	1888/89-1906/07
S.G. Smith	211	955	17272	18.08	1899/1900-1925/26
R.J. Hadlee	342	1490	26998	18.11	1971/72-1990
R.W. Blair	119	537	9961	18.54	1951/52-1964/65
J.H. Bennett	52	241	4476	18.58	1898/99-1919/20

=== Winsor Cup – Won most times ===
The Winsor Cup is awarded to the best bowler in a season for performances in first-class cricket.

- 13 times Richard Hadlee
- 5 times Chris Martin
- 5 times Tim Southee
- 4 times Chris Cairns
- 3 times Jack Cowie
- 3 times Tom Burtt
- 3 times Bob Blair
- 3 times Dick Motz
- 3 times Richard Collinge
- 3 times Danny Morrison
- 3 times Daniel Vettori
- 3 times Trent Boult

== All rounders' Records ==
=== A century and 5 wickets twice in the same match ===
- W.W. Armstrong 126*, 5–27 & 5–25 Australia v New Zealand (not test) at Christchurch 1904/05
- J.N.Crawford 110 & 4*, 5–90 & 5–53 Wellington v Auckland 1917/18

(Only George Hirst has ever scored 2 centuries and taken 5 wickets twice in the same match, 111 & 117*, 6–70 & 5–45, Yorkshire v Somerset, 1906)

=== A century and 10 wickets in the same match ===
- F.E. Woolley 132, 6–50 & 4–38 MCC v Otago at Dunedin 1929/30
- D.N Patel 6 & 204, 6–117 & 4–116 Auckland v Northern Districts at Auckland 1991/92

=== A century and 5 wickets in an innings of the same match ===
(41 instances)
Most recent

- T.G. Southee 156, 5–69 & 2–75 Northern Districts v Wellington at Wellington 2012/13
- B.J. Diamanti 0, 135* & 5–74 Central Districts v Canterbury at Rangiora 2008/09
- T.K. Canning 115 & 6–44, 2–28 Auckland v Northern Districts at Hamilton 2004/05
- G.E. Bradburn 35, 104 & 5–114 Northern Districts v Wellington at Wellington 2000/01

Most times

- J.R. Reid 3 times
- B.R. Taylor 2 times
- M.D. Crowe 2 times

=== 500 runs and 25 wickets in the same season ===
		Runs	Ave	Wkts	Ave
J.R. Reid	1954/55	505	38.84	30	16.53
J.T. Sparling	1959/60	705	37.11	36	19.50
J.R. Reid	1960/61	549	34.31	37	14.78
V. Pollard	1967/68	537	31.58	31	24.74
B.R. Taylor	1968/69	518	39.84	30	28.06
B.L. Cairns	1975/76	538	41.38	27	25.66
R.J. Hadlee	1981/82	500	33.33	59	14.69
V.R. Brown	1984/85	540	38.57	31	31.35
E.J. Gray	1985/86	545	49.54	34	22.00
M.W. Priest	1988/89	603	43.07	28	40.14
G.E. Bradburn	1989/90	842	38.27	30	30.93
D.N. Patel	1991/92	679	52.23	41	28.09
S.W. Duff	1991/92	559	46.58	28	27.64
S.B. Styris	2001/02	662	44.13	28	17.03
P.J. Wiseman	2003/04	535	38.21	31	31.00
C. de Grandhomme	2013/14	629	48.38	30	20.80
A.M. Ellis	2014/15	853	53.31	29	32.93
A.M. Ellis	2015/16	518	37.00	33	18.57
A.M. Ellis	2016/17	652	40.75.00	27	24.59
T.D. Astle	2016/17	522	37.28	31	26.87

=== 2000 runs and 150 wickets for a province ===
		Runs	Bat Ave	Wickets	Bowl Ave
Auckland	J.T. Sparling	2977	28.08	248	21.47
Auckland	D.N. Patel	3648	39.22	184	23.35
Canterbury	D. Reese	2066	25.50	168	18.09
Canterbury	D.W. Stead	3169	25.97	167	29.99
Canterbury	V.R. Brown	2872	28.72	159	27.62
Canterbury	R.J. Hadlee	2012	25.79	285	16.14
Canterbury	M.W. Priest	3457	31.71	290	19.38
Canterbury	**T.D. Astle**	3889	27.19	287	31.44
Central Districts	B.W. Yuile	2190	27.37	233	29.31
Central Districts	S.W. Duff	3079	30.79	208	32.96
Northern Districts	G.E. Bradburn	4614	27.96	231	31.61
Northern Districts	J.A.F Yovich	4839	30.24	255	33.64
Northern Districts	**G.W. Aldridge**	2327	20.23	355	28.31
Wellington	H.M. McGirr	3032	32.60	166	26.06
Wellington	J.R. Reid	4538	48.27	172	18.11
Wellington	E.J. Gray	4228	29.56	357	27.38
Canterbury	**A.M. Ellis**	4972	37.10	237	28.76
Wellington	**J.E.C. Franklin**	4595	44.18	206	24.77

No player has scored 2000 runs and taken 150 wickets for Otago

=== 3750 runs and 375 wickets in a career ===
Players in bold still active

	Matches	Runs	Bat Ave	100s	Wickets	Bowl Ave	5WI
J.R. Reid	246	16128	41.35	39	466	22.60	15
R.J. Hadlee	342	12052	31.71	14	1490	18.11	102
S.G. Smith	211	10920	31.28	14	955	18.08	71
**J.E.C. Franklin**	202	9686	36.00	22	476	28.18	14
C.L. Cairns	217	10702	35.32	13	647	28.31	30
B.W. Yuile	123	3850	24.67	1	375	21.89	17
E.J. Gray	162	5472	28.80	6	444	28.20	16
B.R. Taylor	141	4579	24.75	4	422	25.13	15
C.V. Grimmett	248	4720	17.67	0	1424	18.11	127
J.G. Bracewell	149	4354	25.91	4	522	26.66	33
D.L. Vettori	174	6695	29.62	9	565	31.82	33
A.R. Adams	173	4540	21.31	3	692	23.95	32
D.N. Patel	358	15188	29.95	26	654	33.23	27
B.L. Cairns	148	4165	20.72	1	473	26.52	24
**J.S. Patel**	243	5515	22.51	2	698	34.59	25
P.J. Wiseman	186	4254	20.95	2	466	33.74	18

The order of the players on this list is determined by: Batting average minus Bowling average. The greater the positive difference, the higher he is on the list.

== Wicket keeping records ==
=== Most dismissals for one province ===
		Matches	Caught	Stumped	Total
E.B. McSweeney	Wellington	102	289	39	328
C.J. Nevin	Wellington	106	289	9	298
R.A. Young	Auckland	97	245	5	250
W.K. Lees	Otago	108	208	36	244
R.G. Hart	Northern Districts	85	228	36	243
L.K. Germon	Canterbury	76	217	21	238
B.B.J. Griggs	Central Districts	82	225	7	232
**D.C. de Boorder**	Otago	61	196	16	212
B.A. Young	Northern Districts	93	179	11	190
P.D. McGlashan	Northern Districts	59	175	12	187
B.D. Milburn	Otago	60	148	17	165
J.T. Ward	Canterbury	54	136	17	153
P.J. Kelly	Auckland	48	140	12	152
G.J. Hopkins	Auckland	43	143	4	147

=== Most dismissals in a match ===
Catches	Stumpings	Total			at	
12	0	12	P.D. McGlashan	Northern Districts v Central Districts	Whangarei	2009/10
10	0	10	C.J. Nevin	Wellimgton v Otago	Wellington	1995/96
10	0	10	A.C. Gilchrist	Australia v NZ	Hamilton	1999/2000
10	0	10	G.J. Hopkins	Otago v Canterbury	Dunedin	2004/05
8	2	10	G.J. Hopkins	New Zealand A v Sri Lanka A	Kandy	2005/06
9	1	10	B.B. McCullum	New Zealand v South African Invitation XI	Bloemfontein	2007/08
9	1	10	D.C. De Boorder	Otago v Wellington	Wellington	2009/10

There are 8 instances of 9 dismissals in a match.

=== Most dismissals in an innings ===
Catches	Stumpings	Total			at	
8	0	8	D.C. De Boorder	Otago v Wellimgton	Wellington	2009/10
7	0	7	R.M. Schofield	Central Districts v Wellimgton	Wellington	1964/65
7	0	7	Wasim Bari	Pakistan v NZ	Auckland	1978/79
7	0	7	B.A. Young	Northern District v Canterbury	Christchurch	1986/87
7	0	7	I.D.S. Smith	NZ v Sri Lanka	Hamilton	1990/91
7	0	7	M.G. Croy	Otago v Auckland	Auckland	2001/02
7	0	7	G.J. Hopkins	New Zealand A v South Africa A	Centurion	2004/05
5	2	7	G.J. Hopkins	New Zealand A v Sri Lanka A	Kandy	2005/06
7	0	7	B.B.J. Griggs	Northern Districts v Central Districts	Hamilton	2007/08

There are 15 instances of 6 dismissals in an innings.

=== Most dismissals in a season ===
- **49** (49 catches / 0 stumpings) C.J. Nevin 2001/02
- **44** (43/1) D.C. de Boorder 2011/12
- **43** (41/2) B.J. Watling 2013/14
- **41** (31/10) E.B. McSweeney 1984/85
- **41** (35/6) E.B. McSweeney 1989/90

=== Most dismissals in a career ===
Players in bold are still active.

	Matches	Caught	Stumped	Total
G.J. Hopkins	158	429	26	455
I.D.S. Smith	178	390	36	426
K.C. James †	204	310	112	422
**C.F.K. van Wyk**	127	371	19	390
E.B. McSweeney	121	340	45	385
A.C. Parore	163	358	24	382
W.K. Lees	146	292	44	336
R.A. Young	126	315	5	320
R.G. Hart	110	298	17	315
C.J. Nevin	112	299	9	308
**L. Ronchi**	78	283	13	296
K.J. Wadsworth	118	256	26	282
L.K. Germon	103	256	26	282
**B.B. McCullum**	124	259	19	278

== Fielding records ==
=== Most catches in a match ===
- 7 J.F.M. Morrison, Wellington v Northern Districts at Wellington 1980/81
- 7 S.P. Fleming, NZ v Zimbabwe at Harare 1997/98
- 6 (16 instances)

=== Most catches in an innings ===
(12 instances of 5 catches) Most recent

- 5 M.S. Sinclair, Central Districts v Wellington at Wellington 2010/11
- 5 J.M. Brodie, Wellington v Otago at Wellington 2008/09
- 5 J.M. Myburgh, Canterbury v Auckland at Rangiora 2008/09
- 5 C.Z. Harris, Canterbury v England at Christchurch 2001/02
- 5 S.P. Fleming, NZ v Zimbabwe at Harare 1997/98
- 5 J.J. Crowe, Auckland v Canterbury at Auckland 1988/89

=== Most catches in a season ===
- 23 B.A.G Murray 1967/68
- 22 J.V. Coney 1977/78
- 20 H.J. Howarth 1973/74
