= New Zealand cricket team in England in 1978 =

International cricket tour

The New Zealand cricket team toured England in the 1978 season to play a three-match Test series against England. England won the series 3–0 with no matches drawn. New Zealand played two matches in The Netherlands on their way home.

== One Day Internationals (ODIs) ==
England won the Prudential Trophy 2–0.

=== 1st ODI ===
15 July 1978
Scorecard

England; 206/8 (55 overs)	v	New Zealand; 187/8 (47 overs)
GA Gooch 94 (129); BL Cairns 5/28 (11 overs)		BE Congdon 52* (76); GA Gooch 2/29 (10 overs)

England won by 19 runs
North Marine Road, Scarborough
Umpires: DJ Constant and John Langridge
Player of the match: GA Gooch (ENG)

- New Zealand won the toss and elected to field.
- SL Boock and JG Wright (both NZ) made their ODI debuts.

=== 2nd ODI ===
17 July 1978
Scorecard

England; 278/5 (55 overs)	v	New Zealand; 152 (41.2 overs)
CT Radley 117* (140); BP Bracewell 1/41 (11 overs)		BL Cairns 60 (43); PH Edmonds 3/39 (7.2 overs)

England won by 126 runs
Old Trafford, Manchester
Umpires: HD Bird and BJ Meyer
Player of the match: CT Radley (ENG)

- England won the toss and elected to bat.
- BP Bracewell and BA Edgar (both NZ) made their ODI debuts.

== Test series summary ==
=== First Test ===
27 July–1 August 1978
(5-day match)
Scorecard

New Zealand	v	England
234 (104.2 overs); GP Howarth 94 (225); RGD Willis 5/42 (20.2 overs)		279 (134.5 overs); DI Gower 111 (253); RJ Hadlee 2/43 (21.5 overs)
182 (105.1 overs); BA Edgar 38 (109); PH Edmonds 4/20 (34.1 overs)		138/3 (52.3 overs); GA Gooch 91* (175); BL Cairns 1/21 (7 overs)

England won by 7 wickets
The Oval, London
Umpires: DJ Constant and BJ Meyer
Player of the match: DI Gower (ENG)

- New Zealand won the toss and elected to bat.
- 30 July was taken as a rest day.
- There was no play on the fourth day.
- BP Bracewell and BA Edgar (both NZ) made their Test debuts.

=== Second Test ===
10–14 August 1978
(5-day match)
Scorecard

England	v	New Zealand
429 (180.5 overs); G Boycott 131 (374); RJ Hadlee 4/94 (42 overs)		120 (69.4 overs); GP Howarth 31* (137); IT Botham 6/34 (21 overs)
		190 (f/o) (92.1 overs); BA Edgar 60 (197); PH Edmonds 4/44 (33.1 overs)

England won by an innings and 119 runs
Trent Bridge, Nottingham
Umpires: DJ Constant and TW Spencer
Player of the match: IT Botham (ENG)

- England won the toss and elected to bat.
- 13 August was taken as a rest day.
- The match was scheduled for five days but completed in four.

=== Third Test ===
24–28 August 1978
(5-day match)
Scorecard

New Zealand	v	England
339 (143.1 overs); GP Howarth 123 (291); IT Botham 6/101 (38 overs)		289 (112.3 overs); CT Radley 77 (200); RJ Hadlee 5/84 (32 overs)
67 (37.1 overs); GP Howarth 14* (50); IT Botham 5/39 (18.1 overs)		118/3 (30.5 overs); DI Gower 46 (61); RJ Hadlee 2/31 (13.5 overs)

England won by 7 wickets
Lord's, London
Umpires: HD Bird and BJ Meyer
Player of the match: GP Howarth (NZ)

- New Zealand won the toss and elected to bat.
- 27 August was taken as a rest day.
- The match was scheduled for five days but completed in four.
- JE Emburey (ENG) made his Test debut.

== Matches in Netherlands ==
New Zealand won both limited overs matches.

=== 1st match ===
9 September 1978
(55-over match)
Scorecard

New Zealand; 213 (54.1 overs)	v	Netherlands; 190/4 (55 overs)
John Wright 45; Steven Lubbers 4/21 (10.1 overs)		Steven Lubbers 100*; Brendon Bracewell 2/34 (11 overs)

New Zealand won by 23 runs
VRA Ground, Amstelveen
Umpires: L van Reeven, J Verhoef

- Toss not known

=== 2nd match ===
10 September 1978
(40-over match)
Scorecard

New Zealand; 238/8 (40 overs)	v	Netherlands; 191/4 (40 overs)
Lance Cairns 96; Rob van Weelde 3/16 (8 overs)		Mar Flohil 81*; Graeme Thomson 1/4 (3 overs)

New Zealand won by 47 runs
Sportpark ABN AMRO, Amstelveen
Umpires: L van Reeven, J Verhoef

- Toss not known

== External sources ==
- CricketArchive – tour itineraries
- New Zealand in England, 1978 at ESPNCricinfo

== Annual reviews ==
- Playfair Cricket Annual 1979
- Wisden Cricketers' Almanack 1979
