= Jonathan Ross (cricketer) =

New Zealand lawyer and cricketer

Personal information
- Full name: Christopher Jonathan Ross
- Born: 24 June 1954 (age 72); Warri, Nigeria
- Batting: Right-handed
- Bowling: Right-arm medium-pace

Domestic team information
- Years: Team
- 1975-76: Wellington
- 1978 to 1980: Oxford University
- 1978 to 1980: Combined Universities

Career statistics
Competition	FC	List A
Matches	31	13
Runs scored	132	15
Batting average	4.71	5.00
100s/50s	0/0	0/0
Top score	23*	6
Balls bowled	4016	716
Wickets	55	10
Bowling average	35.23	42.70
5 wickets in innings	0	0
10 wickets in match	0	n/a
Best bowling	4/34	3/31
Catches/stumpings	8/0	1/0
- Source: Cricinfo, 26 July 2019

Christopher Jonathan Ross (born 24 June 1954) is a former cricketer who played first-class and List A cricket in New Zealand and England from 1975 to 1980. He became a lawyer and served as a director of the Reserve Bank of New Zealand.

== Life and career ==
Jonathan Ross was born in Warri, Nigeria, but was educated in New Zealand, where he attended Victoria University of Wellington, graduating with an LL.B (Hons). He was awarded a Rhodes Scholarship to attend Magdalen College, Oxford, where he earned a BA in Economics and Politics and a BCL.

A pace bowler, Ross represented New Zealand Universities and Wellington at cricket. At Oxford he played for the university team from 1978 to 1980. In 1980 he was the captain of Oxford University in its first-class matches and of the Combined Universities team in the Benson & Hedges Cup. His best first-class figures were 4 for 34 for Oxford University against Worcestershire in 1978. His best List A figures were 3 for 31 for Wellington against the touring Indians in 1975-76.

Ross is a corporate, capital markets and financial services lawyer. He was a partner with the leading New Zealand law firm Bell Gully for 23 years until he retired in 2011. He was a non-executive director of the Reserve Bank of New Zealand for some years, and as of 2024 he is a director of several listed and non-listed companies in New Zealand.
