= Graeme Thomson (cricketer) =

New Zealand cricketer

Personal information
- Full name: Graeme Bruce Thomson
- Born: 31 July 1951 (age 75); Invercargill, Southland, New Zealand
- Batting: Left-handed
- Bowling: Left-arm medium

Domestic team information
- Years: Team
- 1968/69–1980/81: Southland
- 1974/75–1980/81: Otago

Career statistics
| Competition | First-class | List A |
|---|---|---|
| Matches | 47 | 13 |
| Runs scored | 340 | 31 |
| Batting average | 9.18 | 6.20 |
| 100s/50s | 0/0 | 0/0 |
| Top score | 34* | 18* |
| Balls bowled | 7,711 | 666 |
| Wickets | 110 | 18 |
| Bowling average | 28.90 | 21.11 |
| 5 wickets in innings | 3 | 0 |
| 10 wickets in match | 1 | 0 |
| Best bowling | 6/41 | 3/12 |
| Catches/stumpings | 23/– | 5/– |
- Source: CricInfo, 26 May 2016

Graeme Bruce Thomson (born 31 July 1951) is a New Zealand former cricketer. He played 47 first-class and 13 List A matches, almost all of them for Otago between the 1974–75 and 1980–81 seasons.

Thomson was born at Invercargill in Southland in 1951. He played for Southland and Otago age-group sides from the 1967–68 season before making his senior debut for Southland the following year. He played Hawke Cup cricket for the team until the 1980–81 season, playing 23 times in the competition, and is considered to have been one of the side's best bowlers. He took seven wickets for 29 runs for the side against South Canterbury in 1974–75.

Primarily a left-arm medium-pace bowler, Thomson made his first-class debut for the Otago provincial side in December 1974, taking five wickets on debut against Northern Districts at Carisbrook in Dunedin. He took 18 wickets in his first season and, other than the 1978–79 season when he only played once, was a regular in the Otago side throughout the remainder of the 1970s.

During the 1977–78 season he took 26 wickets for Otago in the Plunket Shield, his most in first-class cricket. He was selected for the Test team to tour Great Britain in 1978 and played in seven first-class matches on the tour. He was injured during the tour and did not play in any of the three Test matches or either of the One Day International matches the side played against England.

A total of 39 of Thomson's 47 first-class matches were played for Otago. He took 110 wickets, 88 of which were for Otago. As well as his seven matches for the touring New Zealand side he also played once for a South Island team in 1977–78. All 13 of his List A matches were for the provincial side, during which he took a further 18 wickets.
