= Jock Edwards =

New Zealand cricketer (1955–2020)

Personal information
- Full name: Graham Neil Edwards
- Born: 27 May 1955; Nelson, New Zealand
- Died: 6 April 2020 (aged 64)
- Batting: Right-handed
- Role: Wicketkeeper-batsman
- Relatives: Jo Edwards (sister-in-law)

International information
- National side: New Zealand (1976–1981)
- Test debut (cap 139): 18 February 1977 v Australia
- Last Test: 13 March 1981 v India
- ODI debut (cap 22): 21 February 1976 v India
- Last ODI: 15 February 1981 v India

Domestic team information
- Years: Team
- 1973/74–1984/85: Central Districts

Career statistics
Competition	Test	ODI	FC	LA
Matches	8	6	92	31
Runs scored	377	138	4,589	588
Batting average	25.13	23.00	29.41	20.27
100s/50s	0/3	0/0	5/25	0/0
Top score	55	41	177*	49
Balls bowled	–	6	71	6
Wickets	–	1	0	1
Bowling average	–	5.00	–	5.00
5 wickets in innings	–	0	–	0
10 wickets in match	–	0	–	0
Best bowling	–	1/5	–	1/5
Catches/stumpings	7/–	5/–	126/16	19/0
- Source: Cricinfo, 4 April 2017

Graham Neil Edwards (27 May 1955 – 6 April 2020) was a New Zealand cricketer. He played eight Test matches and six One Day Internationals for New Zealand.

== Life and career ==
Edwards was born in Nelson, and attended Nelson College.

He was a short, stocky wicketkeeper who was a good enough batsman to make his Test debut against Australia in 1976–77 as a specialist. He was brought back in 1977–78 as a wicketkeeper-batsman and made 55 and 54 on his comeback against England at Auckland. That won him selection for the England tour in 1978 where his performances were disappointing – one member of the BBC commentary team said that Edwards was "the worst wicketkeeper I've ever seen ... he's made mistakes you'd have the 3rd XI 'keeper at school running round the pitch for". But the genial Edwards kept his spirits up and was a popular tourist. He returned for three home Tests against India in 1980–81 where he chipped in with useful runs, but the emergence of Ian Smith signalled the end of his international career.

Edwards played first-class and List A cricket for Central Districts from 1973–74 to 1984–85. His highest first-class score was 177 not out against Wellington in 1980–81, which was also his most successful season, with 812 runs at an average of 47.76. He was also a prominent player in the Hawke Cup for Nelson for many years, scoring 236 against North Canterbury in his last match, including six sixes and 29 fours.

After retiring from cricket he ran a pub in Murchison, then worked as a gate-keeper at Port Nelson. He had several minor heart attacks before undergoing surgery for a triple bypass in 2007. He died on 6 April 2020.
