= Cliff Dickeson =

New Zealand cricketer (born 1955)

Personal information
- Full name: Clifford Wayne Dickeson
- Born: 26 March 1955 (age 71); Kawakawa, New Zealand
- Batting: Right-handed
- Bowling: Slow left-arm orthodox

Domestic team information
- Years: Team
- 1973/74–1986/87: Northern Districts
- 1975–1976: Bedfordshire

Career statistics
Competition	First-class	List A
Matches	90	32
Runs scored	1,289	257
Batting average	12.04	16.11
100s/50s	0/3	0/1
Top score	59	62
Balls bowled	21,353	1,744
Wickets	282	39
Bowling average	29.22	26.33
5 wickets in innings	9	0
10 wickets in match	2	0
Best bowling	7/79	3/21
Catches/stumpings	59/–	18/–
- Source: Cricinfo, 7 September 2021

Clifford Wayne Dickeson (born 26 March 1955) is a former New Zealand cricketer who played 90 first-class matches for Northern Districts.

A left-arm spin bowler, Dickeson took a record 282 wickets for Northern Districts between 1973 and 1987. His best match figures were 11 for 142 against Wellington in 1979-80 and his best in an innings 7 for 79 the following season against Central Districts.

Dickeson also played two seasons of Minor Counties Championship cricket for Bedfordshire in 1975 and 1976, and Hawke Cup cricket for Northland and Hamilton between 1970 and 1988. He coached the Northern Districts Spirit women's team for 11 years before he retired in 2011.
