= Ernest Wainscott =

New Zealand cricket umpire

Personal information
- Born: 19 March 1932 (age 94); Lower Hutt, New Zealand

Umpiring information
- ODIs umpired: 3 (1973–1975)
- Source: Cricinfo, 31 May 2014

Ernest Gavin Wainscott (born 19 March 1932) is a New Zealand former cricket umpire. He stood in three ODI games between 1973 and 1975.

== See also ==
- List of One Day International cricket umpires
