= John Hastie (umpire) =

New Zealand cricket umpire (1932–2026)

Personal information
- Full name: John Blair Robert Hastie
- Born: 8 November 1932; Te Awamutu, New Zealand
- Died: 1 September 2026 (aged 93); Te Awamutu, New Zealand

Umpiring information
- Tests umpired: 7 (1974–1981)
- ODIs umpired: 4 (1975–1982)
- WODIs umpired: 1 (1982)
- Source: Cricinfo, 7 July 2013

John Blair Robert Hastie (8 November 1932 – 1 September 2026) was a New Zealand cricket umpire. He stood in seven Test matches between 1974 and 1981, and four ODI games between 1975 and 1982.

== Biography ==
Hastie umpired in two of the matches in one of the most acrimonious Test series of all, when the West Indies toured New Zealand in 1979–80. In the First Test, at Carisbrook, Dunedin, after Hastie turned down an appeal by Michael Holding for caught behind, Holding kicked two of the stumps out of the ground. During this Test, Hastie and his colleague Fred Goodall gave a Test record number of leg before wicket decisions: 12 – seven against the West Indies batsmen, five against New Zealand. (Note: This record has been broken numerous times since; as of mid-2024 it is 20 in a Test.) New Zealand won by one wicket.

In all, Hastie umpired in 48 first-class matches and 12 List A matches between January 1964 and March 1984, most of them at either Seddon Park, Hamilton, or Eden Park, Auckland.

In 2025, Hastie became the 35th inductee to the Te Awamutu Walk of Fame, with a commemorative pou unveiled in the town's Selwyn Park.

Hastie died on 1 September 2026, at the age of 93.
