= Eric Dempster =

New Zealand cricketer

Eric Dempster MBE
- Eric Dempster in 1953

Personal information
- Full name: Eric William Dempster
- Born: 25 January 1925; Wellington, New Zealand
- Died: 15 August 2011 (aged 86); Dunedin, New Zealand
- Batting: Left-handed
- Bowling: Slow left-arm orthodox

International information
- National side: New Zealand (1953–1954)
- Test debut (cap 62): 13 March 1953 v South Africa
- Last Test: 5 February 1954 v South Africa

Domestic team information
- Years: Team
- 1947/48–1960/61: Wellington

Umpiring information
- ODIs umpired: 3 (1974–1976)

Career statistics
Competition	Test	First-class
Matches	5	52
Runs scored	106	1,593
Batting average	17.66	21.82
100s/50s	0/0	1/7
Top score	47	105
Balls bowled	544	8,125
Wickets	2	102
Bowling average	109.50	30.80
5 wickets in innings	0	3
10 wickets in match	0	0
Best bowling	1/24	5/46
Catches/stumpings	1/–	25/–
- Source: Cricinfo, 1 April 2017

Eric William Dempster MBE (25 January 1925 – 15 August 2011) was a New Zealand cricketer who played in five Test matches in 1953 and 1954, before becoming an international umpire.

== Cricket career ==
A left-arm spinner and useful lower-order batsman, Dempster played first-class cricket for Wellington from 1947–48 to 1960–61. His best first-class bowling figures of 5 wickets for 46 runs came in the match against Orange Free State at Bloemfontein in 1953–54. He scored his only century, 105, for Wellington against Canterbury at Wellington in the 1956–57 Plunket Shield.

He made his Test debut in the Second Test against South Africa in Auckland in 1952–53, and toured South Africa the following season, playing in four of the five Tests. His best performance in Tests was in the Fourth Test in 1953–54 in Johannesburg: he made 21 not out batting at number eight in the first innings then, when New Zealand followed on, he opened and top-scored with 47 in the second innings.

== After cricket ==
Dempster became an umpire and officiated in several of Otago's home first-class and one-day matches from 1971–72 to 1979–80. He also umpired three One Day International matches in Dunedin and Christchurch between 1973–74 and 1975–76.

Dempster worked in Dunedin as the manager of the artificial limb service which was attached to Dunedin Hospital. In the 1986 Queen's Birthday Honours, he was appointed a Member of the Order of the British Empire, for services to the disabled and cricket. He died in Dunedin on 15 August 2011.
