= Ralph Gardiner (umpire) =

New Zealand cricket umpire

Personal information
- Full name: William Ralph Cameron Gardiner
- Born: 1 January 1941 (age 85); Whangārei, New Zealand

Umpiring information
- Tests umpired: 9 (1974–1980)
- ODIs umpired: 1 (1976)
- FC umpired: 20 (1972–1980)
- LA umpired: 5 (1977–1979)
- Source: CricketArchive – NZC, 6 July 2013

William Ralph Cameron Gardiner (born 1 January 1941) is a former cricket umpire from New Zealand. The 10 international fixtures he umpired in included nine Test matches, between 1974 and 1980, and one ODI game, in 1976. Domestically he umpired 20 first class and 5 List A fixtures, largely at Eden Park.

== See also ==
- List of Test cricket umpires
- List of One Day International cricket umpires
