= Robert Monteith (umpire) =

New Zealand cricket umpire

Personal information
- Full name: Robert Laurence Monteith
- Born: 21 October 1937
- Died: 12 July 1988 (aged 50); Hutt Valley, New Zealand

Umpiring information
- Tests umpired: 6 (1974–1979)
- ODIs umpired: 3 (1975–1981)
- WTests umpired: 1 (1969)
- WODIs umpired: 2 (1982)
- Source: Cricinfo, 13 July 2013

Robert Laurence Monteith (21 October 1937 – 12 July 1988) was a New Zealand cricket umpire. Making his international umpiring debut in 1974, he stood in six Test matches between 1974 and 1979, and three ODI games between 1975 and 1981.

== See also ==
- List of Test cricket umpires
- List of One Day International cricket umpires
