= Glenn Turner =

New Zealand cricketer (born 1947)

Personal information
- Full name: Glenn Maitland Turner
- Born: 26 May 1947 (age 79); Dunedin, New Zealand
- Batting: Right-handed
- Role: Batsman
- Relatives: Sukhi Turner (wife); Brian Turner (brother); Greg Turner (brother)

International information
- National side: New Zealand (1969–1983)
- Test debut (cap 174): 27 February 1969 v West Indies
- Last Test: 11 March 1983 v Sri Lanka
- ODI debut (cap 9): 11 February 1973 v Pakistan
- Last ODI: 20 June 1983 v Pakistan

Domestic team information
- Years: Team
- 1964/65–1975/76: Otago
- 1967–1982: Worcestershire
- 1976/77: Northern Districts
- 1977/78–1982/83: Otago

Career statistics
Competition	Test	ODI	FC	LA
Matches	41	41	455	313
Runs scored	2,991	1,598	34,346	10,784
Batting average	44.64	47.00	49.70	37.70
100s/50s	7/14	3/9	103/148	14/66
Top score	259	171*	311*	171*
Balls bowled	12	6	442	196
Wickets	0	0	5	9
Bowling average	–	–	37.80	16.88
5 wickets in innings	–	–	0	0
10 wickets in match	–	–	0	0
Best bowling	–	–	3/18	2/4
Catches/stumpings	42/–	13/–	409/–	125/–
- Source: Cricinfo, 25 August 2010

Glenn Maitland Turner (born 26 May 1947) is a New Zealand former cricketer and coach. A right-handed batter who predominantly opened the batting, he played 41 Test and 41 One Day International (ODI) matches for New Zealand from 1969 to 1983.

In New Zealand domestic cricket, Turner represented Otago between 1964 and 1976, as well as Northern Districts in 1976/1977. He also represented Worcestershire in English county cricket from 1967 to 1982.

Turner served as the coach of New Zealand between 1985 and 1987, and for the second time between 1995 and 1996.

== Early life ==
Glenn Turner was born at Dunedin in 1947 and went to Otago Boys' High School, where he became serious about playing cricket. He played for the school between 1962 and 1964. He admitted that he spent so much time playing sport that he neglected his studies. He played a trial match for Otago against Southland in Invercargill where he scored 105 not out. This innings helped him get selected for the Otago team to play in the Plunket Shield at the age of 17.

His brothers are poet Brian Turner and golfer Greg Turner. His wife Dame Sukhi Turner, whom he met while touring India in 1969, is a former mayor of Dunedin.

== Domestic career ==
Turner made his first class debut for Otago against Canterbury at Carisbrook in 1964. He scored 126 runs that season averaging 14 per innings. He was a very slow scorer of runs at that stage. In one innings he scored 21 runs in 235 minutes. His second season of first class cricket in 1965–66, he finished second in the averages with 330 runs at an average of 47.14. In his third season of first class cricket for Otago in 1966–67, he scored 224 runs at an average of 22.4 per innings. Turner had trials with Warwickshire, Worcestershire, Lancashire, Middlesex, and Surrey and gained a contract with Worcestershire. He played two games for Worcestershire in 1967 and in the following season (1968) he played 25 first class games for them scoring 1182 runs at 28.82 with one century (106 against Middlesex). He had a quieter 1969 season scoring only 502 runs and failing to score a century.

In 1970, Glenn Turner had his best season in first class cricket for Worcestershire. He chose to play more aggressively and scored 2379 runs which included 10 centuries and 9 fifties at an average of 61 runs. He was described by Tom Graveney that season as "He suddenly found the confidence to play his shots". Wisden named him as one of their Players of the Year. His 2379 runs that year also made him the highest run scorer for the English season.

Glenn Turner made his mark on the first-class cricket scene, particularly with Worcestershire in the English county championship. In all, he played 455 first-class matches, amassing 34,346 runs at 49.70, including 103 centuries making him one of a select few to score a "century of centuries", one of only four non-English cricketers to do so (the others being Donald Bradman, Zaheer Abbas and Viv Richards).

Turner is one of only two players (the other being Graeme Hick in 1988 also for Worcestershire) since the Second World War to have scored 1000 first-class runs in England before the end of May, a feat he achieved in 1973. Among the eight batsmen who have done this, only Turner and Donald Bradman did it while playing for a touring team. Christopher Martin-Jenkins described him as 'unswervingly single-minded in his pursuit of runs' and 'unashamedly ambitious'. In 1973, Glenn Turner again was the highest run scorer in the English season, scoring a total of 2416 runs.

Glenn Turner scored the most first class runs in the New Zealand 1975–76 season. He scored a total of 1244 runs at an average of 77.75 in 20 innings. This included scores of 177*, 104, 115 and 121* for Otago and 177 for New Zealand.

He also holds the record of highest percentage of runs scored in any completed innings 83.43% after he scored 141* out of Worcestershire's 169 against Glamorgan at Swansea in 1977. The remaining batsmen scored 27, highest 7 and there was one extra.

In 1979, Glenn Turner scored his last century in New Zealand. His 136 for Otago at Molyneux Park in Alexandra included a partnership with Wayne Blair (who scored 82*) to draw with Auckland.

On 29 May 1982, in scoring his 100th first class century, Turner became the first batsman in 33 years to score 300 runs in a single day in England. He was 311 not out when Worcestershire declared at 501–1 against Warwickshire. Glenn Turner also succeeded in averaging 90.07 runs during the 1982 English season.

== International career ==
After scoring 123 for the South Island versus the West Indies, Glenn Turner made his test debut against the West Indies in March 1969 making a duck in the first innings and 40 in the second innings on debut in the first test. He followed this up with 74 in the first innings of the second test.

In the 1972 New Zealand tour of the West Indies, Turner scored four double centuries. The first was 202* against the Presidents' XI, then 223* in the first test, 259 against Guyana and 259 in the fourth test. The 259 in the fourth test was the second longest innings in test cricket in terms of the 759 balls faced. His performances saw him named the New Zealand Cricket Almanack Player of the Year.

In 1974, Turner became the first New Zealander to score a century in each innings in a test match which assisted New Zealand to beat Australia for the first time in a test match.

Glenn Turner is also the first player to score in an ODI a score of over 150 and also holds the record for the only batsman in ODI history to have faced over 200 deliveries in a single innings.

He represented New Zealand in 41 Tests, and achieved an average of 44.64, including seven centuries. He would have appeared for his country much more, however, had he not elected to be unavailable for several seasons after falling out with administrators.

=== Cricket World Cup ===
Glenn Turner played in three world cups. In the 1975 world cup, He scored 171* in New Zealand's opening game against East Africa. At that time it was the highest one day international score ever made, passing both David Lloyd's 116 for the highest by a male cricketer in ODI and Lynne Thomas' overall record of 134. With a bowling attack lacking experience against someone like Turner, he found gaps in the field and scored "mostly with magnificent drives". It was also the longest individual innings in one-day international history, occupying 201 balls. He scored a second century (114*) against India in the third round robin match.

In the 1979 world cup, Glenn Turner topped the averages (88) and runs scored (176) for New Zealand without scoring a century.

In the 1983 world cup, he had a disappointing tournament scoring 103 runs from six innings.

== Cricket coach ==
Glenn Turner was the manager or coach of the New Zealand Cricket team between 1985 and 1987 for the Australian series when he presided over the team's first series victory in Australia, the 1986 tour to England, the West Indies tour of New Zealand and the 1987 world cup. He coached at the New Zealand Cricket Academy between 1991 and 1994. In 1995, he was again appointed the New Zealand cricket team coach until 1996 and coached the team in the 1996 Cricket World Cup.

== Author ==
Turner has written five books on his involvement in cricket:

- My Way (1975)
- Glenn Turner's Century of Centuries (with Ray Cairns, 1983)
- Opening Up (with Brian Turner, 1987)
- Lifting the Covers (with Brian Turner, 1998)
- Cricket's Global Warming (with Lynn McConnell, 2020)

Sporting positions
Preceded by Bevan Congdon	New Zealand national cricket captain 1975/76–1976/77	Succeeded by Mark Burgess
Preceded by Norman Gifford	Worcestershire County Cricket Captain; 1981	Succeeded by Phil Neale
