= Trans-Tasman Trophy =

Australia–New Zealand Test cricket series

- Countries: Australia; New Zealand
- Administrator: Cricket Australia; New Zealand Cricket
- Format: Test cricket
- First edition: 1985–86
- Latest edition: 2023–24
- Tournament format: Test series
- Number of teams: 2
- Current trophy holder: Australia
- Most successful: Australia (12 series wins)
- Most runs: Allan Border, Australia (1,356)
- Most wickets: Shane Warne, Australia (103)

The Trans-Tasman Trophy is awarded to the winner of the Australia–New Zealand Test match series in cricket. The trophy is awarded to the team that wins a Test series, or one-off Test match, between the two nations. If the series is a draw, the holder retains the trophy. It was first competed for in the 1985–86 season, although six Test series between the nations were contested before the trophy's instigation.

As of March 2024, Australia hold the trophy following their 2–0 series win in the 2023–24 series in New Zealand. Australia also lead in overall wins, winning 12 of the 19 series, while New Zealand (nicknamed the Black Caps) have won 3, the remaining 4 ending in draws. Australia's Allan Border is the most successful batsman in the history of the trophy, scoring 1,356 runs in 25 innings at an average of 61.63. New Zealand's Ross Taylor holds the record for the highest score in the trophy's history, with 290 in the second innings of the second Test of the 2015–16 series in Australia. Taylor's score surpassed the previous record set in the same Test; Australian David Warner struck 253 in the first innings. Australian spin bowler Shane Warne has taken the most wickets in the trophy, with 103 in 20 matches at an average of 24.37, while New Zealand's Richard Hadlee has the best bowling figures with 9 wickets for 52 runs which he took in the first innings of the inaugural Test. Former Australian captain Mark Taylor has taken the most catches, with 25 in 11 matches, while fellow countryman Ian Healy is the most successful wicket-keeper, making 42 dismissals in 11 matches.

== History ==
The first series for which the Trans-Tasman Trophy was contested was in the 1985–86 season. The first Test witnessed exceptional bowling from New Zealand's fast bowler Richard Hadlee, who took 9 for 52 in the first innings, at the time the fourth best bowling figures in cricket history. His 6 for 71 in the second led New Zealand to victory by an innings and 41 runs. Described as "the greatest performance by a New Zealand cricketer", Hadlee himself called his performance a "fairytale". Australia fought back to win the second Test, but New Zealand secured the series win with a victory in the deciding Test, with Hadlee taking another eleven wickets in the match, and being named player of the series. The return series that season saw the first two Tests drawn before New Zealand won the third and final Test to retain the trophy. John Bracewell, in a man of the match performance, took a ten-wicket haul, becoming the first New Zealand spin bowler to do so. Australia's first win in the trophy came in the 1987–88 series. A nine-wicket victory for Australia in the first Test was followed by two draws, the second of which ended with New Zealand seeking just one more wicket to tie the series and retain the trophy. Despite New Zealand losing the trophy, Hadlee was named man of the series once again, taking three five-wicket hauls in his 18 wickets over the three Tests.

Both series during the 1989–90 season comprised single matches. The match in Australia saw the home team score 520 before dismissing New Zealand still 290 runs behind and enforcing the follow-on. A man-of-the-match performance from New Zealand's Mark Greatbatch, in which he batted for 655 minutes, ensured the draw. In the return fixture in New Zealand, Australia posted their second-lowest total against the Black Caps, 110 all out in the first innings. In a rain-affected innings, New Zealand took a lead of 92 runs. Australia posted 269 in their second innings to leave New Zealand just over one day to chase down 178. Man of the match and New Zealand captain John Wright scored an unbeaten 117 to secure a nine-wicket victory. The 1992–93 series was drawn, with one victory each and a draw, so New Zealand retained the Trans-Tasman Trophy.

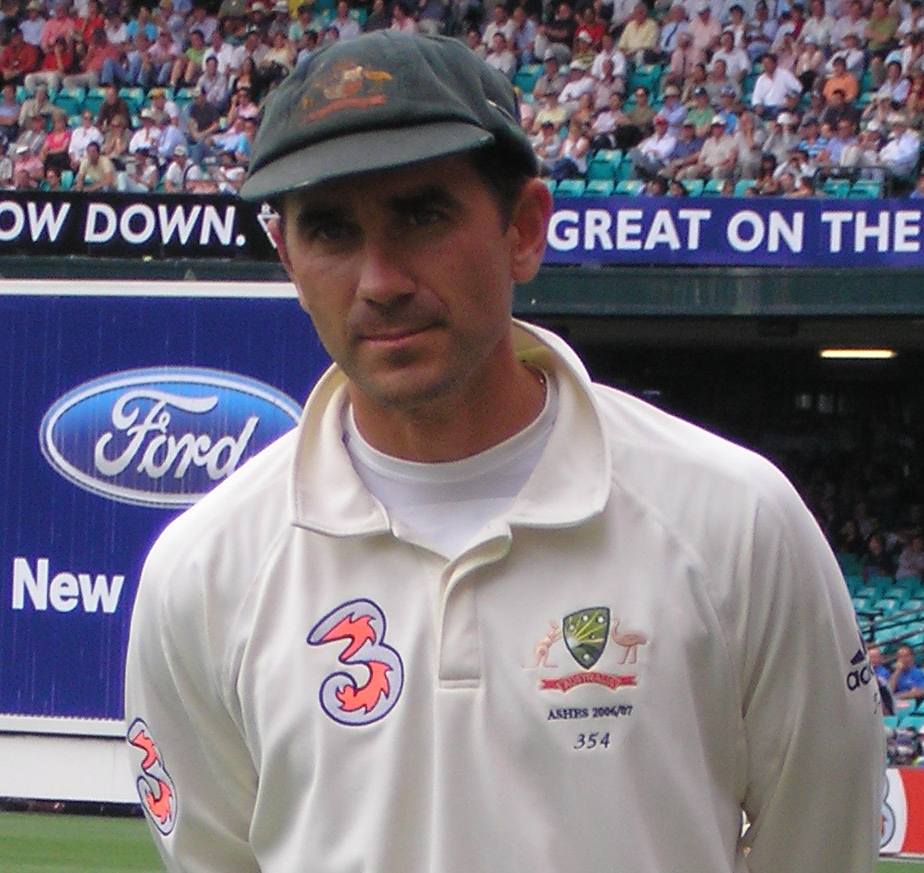
Justin Langer was player of the tournament in the 2001–02 series.

The 1993–94 series marked the beginning of a period of Australian dominance which continues to the most recent series. The first Test was a high-scoring draw, while the second Test saw three of Australia's top four batsmen score centuries, before declaring on 544 for 6. New Zealand put up little resistance, scoring 161 in both innings after being forced to follow-on, losing by an innings and 222 runs. Australia's batsmen dominated the third Test, declaring on 607 for 6 in reply to New Zealand's 233 all out. The Black Caps captain Ken Rutherford offered some resistance with 86, but his team were all out for 278, losing the Test by an innings and 96 runs; once again the Trans-Tasman Trophy returned to Australia. The 1997–98 and 1999–2000 series were won by Australia, the latter being a 3–0 whitewash.

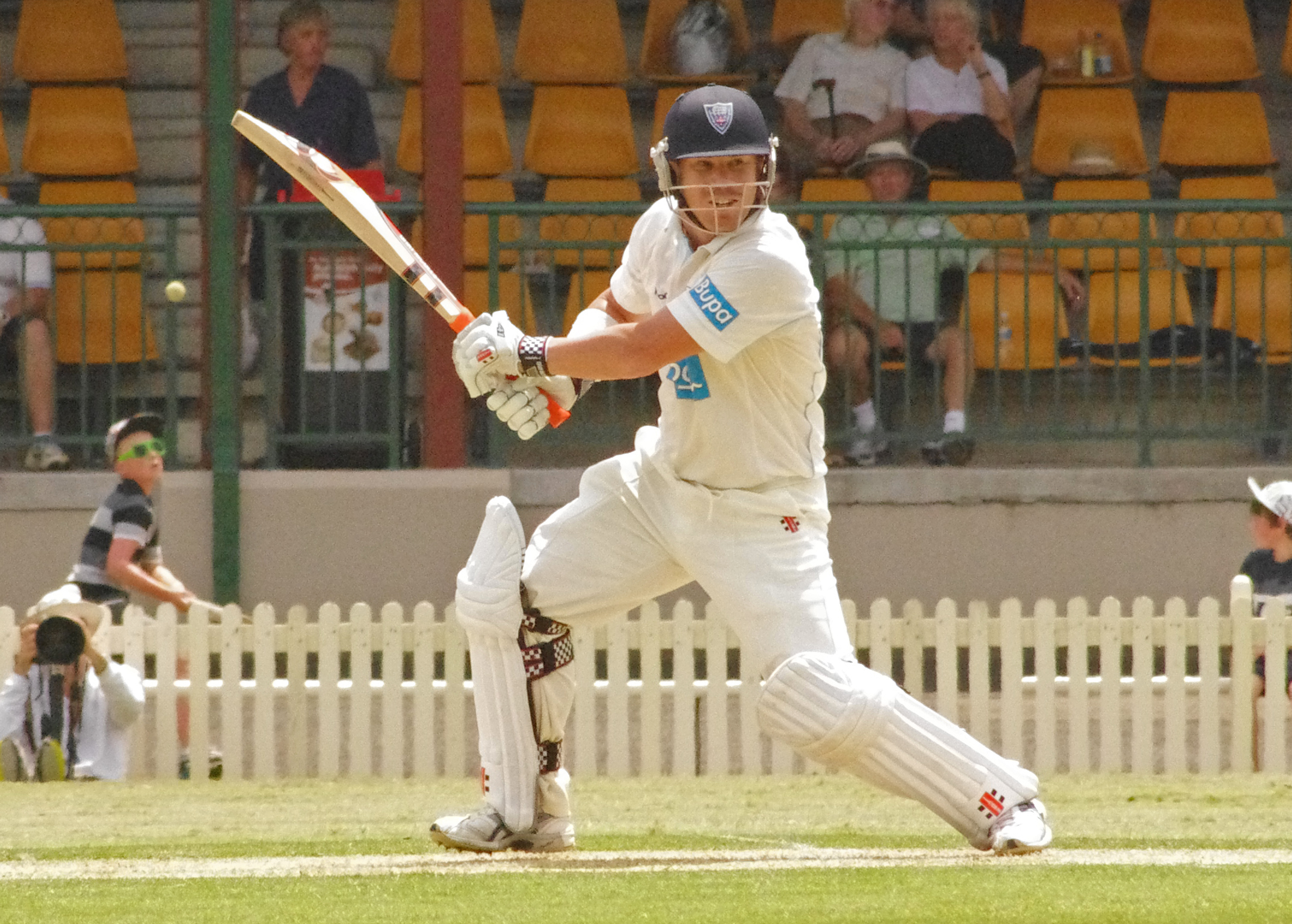
David Warner was player of the tournament in the 2015–16 series in Australia.

All three Tests in the 2001–02 series ended in draws, so Australia retained the trophy. Australian opening batsman Justin Langer scored two centuries in the first two Tests and was named player of the series. Three of the next four series saw New Zealand whitewashed, and heading into the 2011–12 series having lost 15 and drawn 6 of the previous 21 Tests. A five-wicket haul from Australia's James Pattinson on his debut helped secure a nine-wicket victory in the first of the two Tests. Australia's batting collapse in the second Test, with Bracewell taking 6 for 40, handed New Zealand a narrow victory by seven runs, the first win on Australian soil for the Black Caps since 1985. The series was drawn and, again, Australia retained the trophy. The two series conducted during the 2015–16 season were both won by Australia, who won four out of the five Tests, the other ending in a draw. Overall, Australia have won 28 of the 45 Test matches played for the Trans-Tasman Trophy, with New Zealand winning 6.

In February 2026, following Cricket Australia's release of the Test teams schedule for the 2026–27 season, the Trans-Tasman Trophy was confirmed to be contested over four Tests for the first time in its history.

== List of Test series ==
Series	Years	Host	Tests	Australia	New Zealand	Drawn	Result	Holder	Player of the Series
1	1985–86	Australia	3	1	2	0	New Zealand	New Zealand	Richard Hadlee (New Zealand)
2	1985–86	New Zealand	3	0	1	2	New Zealand	New Zealand	—N/a
3	1987–88	Australia	3	1	0	2	Australia	Australia	Richard Hadlee (New Zealand)
4	1989–90	Australia	1	0	0	1	Drawn	Australia	Mark Greatbatch (New Zealand)‡
5	1989–90	New Zealand	1	0	1	0	New Zealand	New Zealand	John Wright (New Zealand)‡
6	1992–93	New Zealand	3	1	1	1	Drawn	New Zealand	—N/a
7	1993–94	Australia	3	2	0	1	Australia	Australia	Shane Warne (Australia)
8	1997–98	Australia	3	2	0	1	Australia	Australia	Mark Taylor (Australia)
9	1999–2000	New Zealand	3	3	0	0	Australia	Australia	—N/a
10	2001–02	Australia	3	0	0	3	Drawn	Australia	Justin Langer (Australia)
11	2004–05	Australia	2	2	0	0	Australia	Australia	Glenn McGrath (Australia)
12	2004–05	New Zealand	3	2	0	1	Australia	Australia	Adam Gilchrist (Australia)
13	2008–09	Australia	2	2	0	0	Australia	Australia	Michael Clarke (Australia)
14	2009–10	New Zealand	2	2	0	0	Australia	Australia	—N/a
15	2011–12	Australia	2	1	1	0	Drawn	Australia	James Pattinson (Australia)
16	2015–16	Australia	3	2	0	1	Australia	Australia	David Warner (Australia)
17	2015–16	New Zealand	2	2	0	0	Australia	Australia	—N/a
18	2019–20	Australia	3	3	0	0	Australia	Australia	Marnus Labuschagne (Australia)
19	2023–24	New Zealand	2	2	0	0	Australia	Australia	Matt Henry (New Zealand)
20	2026–27	Australia	4	TBD					
Total			47	28	6	13			

Total Series	Australia	New Zealand	Drawn
19	12	3	4

- ‡ indicates player of the match award in one-off Test.
- N/A indicates that no player of the series award was designated.

== See also ==
- Chappell–Hadlee Trophy
