= New Zealand cricket team in Australia in 1997–98 =

International cricket tour

The New Zealand national cricket team toured Australia in the 1997-98 season and played three Test matches against Australia. Australia won the series 2-0 with one match drawn.

== Test series summary ==
=== 1st Test ===
7–11 November 1997
(5-day match)
Scorecard

Australia	v	New Zealand
373 (121 overs); MA Taylor 112 (258); SB Doull 4/70 (30 overs)		349 (132.2 overs); SP Fleming 91 (229); SK Warne 4/106 (42 overs)
6/294dec (100.5 overs); GS Blewett 91 (203); CL Cairns 3/54 (16 overs)		132 (62 overs); BA Young 45 (77); GD McGrath 5/32 (17 overs)

Australia won by 186 runs
Brisbane Cricket Ground, Woolloongabba, Brisbane
Umpires: VK Ramaswamy (IND) and SG Randell (AUS)
Player of the match: MA Taylor (AUS)

- New Zealand won the toss and elected to field.
- CD McMillan (NZ) made his Test debut.

=== 2nd Test ===
20–23 November 1997
(5-day match)
Scorecard

New Zealand	v	Australia
217 (74.4 overs); CD McMillan 54 (75); SK Warne 4/83 (22.4 overs)		461 (131.4 overs); SR Waugh 96 (161); CL Cairns 4/95 (28 overs)
174 (64.2 overs); AC Parore 63 (128); SH Cook 5/39 (10.2 overs)

Australia won by an innings and 70 runs
WACA Ground, Perth
Umpires: DB Hair (AUS) and G Sharp (ENG)
Player of the match: SR Waugh (AUS)

- New Zealand won the toss and elected to bat.
- The match was scheduled for five days but completed in four.
- SH Cook (AUS) made his Test debut.

=== 3rd Test ===
27 November–1 December 1997
(5-day match)
Scorecard

Australia	v	New Zealand
400 (141.1 overs); MTG Elliott 114 (265); SB Doull 3/87 (33 overs)		6/251dec (90 overs); MJ Horne 133 (259); SR Waugh 3/20 (9 overs)
2/138dec (38 overs); MA Taylor 66* (127); SB O'Connor 1/32 (9 overs)		9/223 (61 overs); CD McMillan 41 (59); AC Parore 41 (56); SK Warne 5/88 (28 overs)

Match drawn
Bellerive Oval, Hobart
Umpires: SJ Davis (AUS) and RB Tiffin (ZIM)
Player of the match: GS Blewett (AUS)

- Australia won the toss and elected to bat.

== Sources ==
- Playfair Cricket Annual
- Wisden Cricketers Almanack
- CricketArchive
