= Australian cricket team in New Zealand in 1999–2000 =

The Australia national cricket team toured New Zealand from February to April 2000 and played a three-match Test series against the New Zealand national cricket team. Australia won the Test series 3–0. New Zealand were captained by Stephen Fleming and Australia by Steve Waugh. In addition, the teams played a six-match series of Limited Overs Internationals (LOI) which Australia won 4–1.

== One Day Internationals (ODIs) ==
Australia won the Bank of New Zealand Series 4-1, with one no-result.

=== 1st ODI ===
17 February 2000 (D/N)
Scorecard

Australia; 119/1 (23 overs)	v	New Zealand
ML Hayden 64* (68); CL Cairns 1/21 (5 overs)

No result
WestpacTrust Stadium, Wellington
Umpires: RS Dunne and EA Watkin
Player of the match: No award

- New Zealand won the toss and elected to field.
- The match was reduced before play started to 43 overs per side.
- WA Wisneski (NZ) made his ODI debut

=== 2nd ODI ===
19 February 2000 (D/N)
Scorecard

New Zealand; 122 (30.1 overs)	v	Australia; 123/5 (24.4 overs)
CD McMillan 35 (49); B Lee 3/21 (7 overs)		ML Hayden 50 (49); PJ Wiseman 2/21 (5 overs)

Australia won by 5 wickets
Eden Park, Auckland
Umpires: BF Bowden and DB Cowie
Player of the match: B Lee (AUS)

- New Zealand won the toss and elected to bat.

=== 3rd ODI ===
23 February 2000 (D/N)
Scorecard

Australia; 310/4 (50 overs)	v	New Zealand; 260 (45 overs)
AC Gilchrist 77 (65); CL Cairns 2/61 (10 overs)		NJ Astle 81 (83); DR Martyn 2/34 (8 overs)

Australia won by 50 runs
Carisbrook, Dunedin
Umpires: DB Cowie and RS Dunne
Player of the match: AC Gilchrist (AUS)

- New Zealand won the toss and elected to field.

=== 4th ODI ===
26 February 2000 (D/N)
Scorecard

Australia; 349/6 (50 overs)	v	New Zealand; 301/9 (50 overs)
AC Gilchrist 128 (98); CZ Harris 2/58 (10 overs)		SP Fleming 82 (88); SK Warne 3/50 (9 overs)

Australia won by 48 runs
Jade Stadium, Christchurch
Umpires: BF Bowden and DM Quested
Player of the match: AC Gilchrist (AUS)

- New Zealand won the toss and elected to field.
- MS Sinclair (NZ) made his ODI debut.

=== 5th ODI ===
1 March 2000 (D/N)
Scorecard

New Zealand; 243/9 (50 overs)	v	Australia; 245/5 (45.4 overs)
NJ Astle 104 (128); DW Fleming 4/41 (8 overs)		MG Bevan 107 (141); CL Cairns 2/31 (8 overs)

Australia won by 5 wickets
McLean Park, Napier
Umpires: DB Cowie and EA Watkin
Player of the match: MG Bevan (AUS)

- Australia won the toss and elected to field.
- CJ Nevin (NZ) made his ODI debut.

=== 6th ODI ===
3 March 2000 (D/N)
Scorecard

Australia; 191 (46.2 overs)	v	New Zealand; 194/3 (41 overs)
DR Martyn 116* (135); CL Cairns 3/33 (9 overs)		CJ Nevin 74 (94); A Symonds 1/6 (2 overs)

New Zealand won by 7 wickets
Eden Park, Auckland
Umpires: DB Cowie and RS Dunne
Player of the match: CJ Nevin (NZ)

- Australia won the toss and elected to bat.

== Test series summary ==
=== 1st Test ===
11–15 March 2000
(5-day match)
Scorecard

Australia	v	New Zealand
214 (71 overs); ME Waugh 72* (144); DL Vettori 5/62 (25 overs)		163 (62.1 overs); CL Cairns 35 (66); GD McGrath 4/33 (11.1 overs)
229 (77.5 overs); AC Gilchrist 59 (99); DL Vettori 7/87 (35 overs)		218 (73.3 overs); CD McMillan 78 (163); CR Miller 5/55 (18 overs)

Australia won by 62 runs
Eden Park, Auckland
Umpires: BF Bowden (NZ) and S Venkataraghavan (IND)
Player of the match: DL Vettori (NZ)

- Australia won the toss and elected to bat.
- There was no play on the fourth day.

=== 2nd Test ===
24–27 March 2000
(5-day match)
Scorecard

New Zealand	v	Australia
298 (80.5 overs); CL Cairns 109 (138); SK Warne 4/68 (14.5 overs)		419 (120.3 overs); SR Waugh 151* (312); CD McMillan 3/57 (23 overs)
294 (96.2 overs); CL Cairns 69 (83); B Lee 3/87 (23 overs)		177/4 (54.1 overs); JL Langer 57 (75); SB O'Connor 2/42 (11 overs)

Australia won by 6 wickets
Basin Reserve, Wellington
Umpires: DM Quested (NZ) and Riazuddin (PAK)
Player of the match: MJ Slater (AUS)

- New Zealand won the toss and elected to bat.
- The match was scheduled for five days but completed in four.

=== 3rd Test ===
31 March–3 April 2000
(5-day match)
Scorecard

New Zealand	v	Australia
232 (82.5 overs); CD McMillan 79 (145); B Lee 5/77 (23 overs)		252 (61.5 overs); DR Martyn 89* (136); SB O'Connor 5/51 (15.5 overs)
229 (86.4 overs); CL Cairns 71 (104); B Lee 3/46 (18.4 overs)		212/4 (41.3 overs); JL Langer 122* (122); PJ Wiseman 2/42 (9 overs)

Australia won by 6 wickets
Seddon Park, Hamilton
Umpires: RS Dunne (NZ) and AV Jayaprakash (IND)
Player of the match: AC Gilchrist (AUS)

- Australia won the toss and elected to field.
- The match was scheduled for five days but completed in four.
- DR Tuffey (NZ) made his Test debut.
