= Australian cricket team in New Zealand in 2004–05 =

International cricket tour

The Australia national cricket team toured New Zealand in February and March 2005 and played a three-match Test series against the New Zealand national cricket team. Australia won the Test series 2–0. New Zealand were captained by Stephen Fleming and Australia by Ricky Ponting. In addition, the teams played a five-match series of Limited Overs Internationals (LOI) which Australia won 5–0.

In the third Test in Auckland, James Marshall made his debut for New Zealand. Also playing in the same match was his twin brother, Hamish. This was the first time that identical twins have played together in the same Test side.

== T20I series ==
=== Only T20I ===
17 February 2005 (D/N)
Scorecard

Australia; 214/5 (20 overs)	v	New Zealand; 170 (20 overs)
RT Ponting 98* (55); KD Mills 3/44 (4 overs)		SB Styris 66 (39); MS Kasprowicz 4/29 (4 overs)

Australia won by 44 runs
Eden Park, Auckland
Umpires: BF Bowden (NZ) and AL Hill (NZ)
Player of the match: RT Ponting (AUS)

- Australia won the toss and elected to bat
- This was the first ever Twenty20 International.

== ODI series ==
=== 1st ODI ===
19 February 2005 (D/N)
Scorecard

Australia; 236/7 (50 overs)	v	New Zealand; 226 (48.4 overs)
ML Hayden 71 (109); SB Styris 4/40 (10 overs)		HJH Marshall 76 (69); GD McGrath 4/16 (9.4 overs)

Australia won by 10 runs
Westpac Stadium, Wellington
Umpires: Aleem Dar (PAK) and BF Bowden (NZ)
Player of the match: GD McGrath (AUS)

- Australia won the toss and elected to bat.

=== 2nd ODI ===
22 February 2005 (D/N)
Scorecard

Australia; 314/6 (50 overs)	v	New Zealand; 208 (40.4 overs)
ML Hayden 114 (124); KD Mills 2/62 (10 overs)		DL Vettori 83 (77); A Symonds 3/41 (6 overs)

Australia won by 106 runs
Jade Stadium, Christchurch
Umpires: Aleem Dar (PAK) and BF Bowden (NZ)
Player of the match: ML Hayden (AUS)

- New Zealand won the toss and elected to field.

=== 3rd ODI ===
26 February 2005 (D/N)
Scorecard

Australia; 264/5 (50 overs)	v	New Zealand; 178 (41.5 overs)
MJ Clarke 71* (75); DL Vettori 2/31 (10 overs)		HJH Marshall 55 (87); GB Hogg 3/45 (7.5 overs)

Australia won by 86 runs
Eden Park, Auckland
Umpires: Aleem Dar (PAK) and DB Cowie (NZ)
Player of the match: MJ Clarke (AUS)

- Australia won the toss and elected to bat.
- JAH Marshall (NZ) made his ODI debut.

=== 4th ODI ===
1 March 2005
Scorecard

New Zealand; 233 (49.5 overs)	v	Australia; 236/3 (34.2 overs)
SP Fleming 37 (53); NJ Astle 37 (60); B Lee 2/41 (9 overs)		DR Martyn 65* (88); CL Cairns 1/30 (6 overs)

Australia won by 7 wickets
Basin Reserve, Wellington
Umpires: Aleem Dar (PAK) and AL Hill (NZ)
Player of the match: AC Gilchrist (AUS)

- Australia won the toss and elected to field.
- JR Hopes (AUS) and LJ Hamilton (NZ) made their ODI debuts.

=== 5th ODI ===
5 March 2005
Scorecard

Australia; 347/5 (50 overs)	v	New Zealand; 225/8 (50 overs)
RT Ponting 141* (127); CD McMillan 1/63 (7 overs)		CD McMillan 63 (69); MS Kasprowicz 3/36 (10 overs)

Australia won by 122 runs
McLean Park, Napier
Umpires: AL Hill (NZ) and DR Shepherd (ENG)
Player of the match: RT Ponting (AUS)

- New Zealand won the toss and elected to field.

== Test series ==
=== 1st Test ===
10–13 March 2005
(5-day match)
Scorecard

New Zealand	v	Australia
433 (141 overs); HJH Marshall 146 (256); GD McGrath 6/115 (42 overs)		432 (123.2 overs); AC Gilchrist 121 (126); DL Vettori 5/106 (40.2 overs)
131 (50 overs); BB McCullum 24 (37); SK Warne 5/39 (14 overs)		135/1 (31.3 overs); JL Langer 72* (85); DL Vettori 1/55 (13.3 overs)

Australia won by 9 wickets
Jade Stadium, Christchurch
Umpires: Aleem Dar (PAK) and DR Shepherd (ENG)
Player of the match: AC Gilchrist (AUS)

- Australia won the toss and elected to field.
- The match was scheduled for five days but completed in four.
- CD Cumming and IE O'Brien (both NZ) made their Test debuts.

=== 2nd Test ===
18–22 March 2005
(5-day match)
Scorecard

Australia	v	New Zealand
570/8dec (140 overs); DR Martyn 165 (287); JEC Franklin 4/128 (28 overs)		244 (81.1 overs); L Vincent 63 (164); MS Kasprowicz 3/42 (16 overs)
		48/3 (17.2 overs) (f/o); L Vincent 24 (33); GD McGrath 2/10 (6 overs)

Match drawn
Basin Reserve, Wellington
Umpires: RE Koertzen (SA) and DR Shepherd (ENG)
Player of the match: AC Gilchrist (AUS)

- New Zealand won the toss and elected to field.
- There was no play on the first day.

=== 3rd Test ===
26–29 March 2005
(5-day match)
Scorecard

New Zealand	v	Australia
292 (116.2 overs); HJH Marshall 76 (208); GD McGrath 3/49 (34 overs)		383 (118.1 overs); RT Ponting 105 (110); JEC Franklin 6/119 (26.1 overs)
254 (69.2 overs); NJ Astle 69 (107); GD McGrath 4/40 (16.2 overs)		166/1 (29.3 overs); RT Ponting 86* (84)

Australia won by 9 wickets
Eden Park, Auckland
Umpires: RE Koertzen (SA) and JW Lloyds (ENG)
Player of the match: RT Ponting (AUS)

- New Zealand won the toss and elected to bat.
- The match was scheduled for five days but completed in four.
- JAH Marshall (NZ) made his Test debut.
