= New Zealand cricket team in Australia in 2026–27 =

International cricket tour

	Australia	New Zealand
- Dates: 9 December 2026 – 8 January 2027

Test series

The New Zealand cricket team is scheduled to tour Australia in December 2026 through January 2027, to play four Test matches. The Test series forms part of the 2025–2027 ICC World Test Championship, with both sides contesting the Trans-Tasman Trophy. In February 2026, Cricket Australia (CA) confirmed the fixtures for the tour.

The Test series marked the first Trans-Tasman Trophy to be contested across four Tests.

== Venues ==
The series venues were confirmed in February 2026.

Melbourne	Perth	Adelaide	
Melbourne Cricket Ground	Perth Stadium	Adelaide Oval	
Capacity: 100,024	Capacity: 61,266	Capacity: 53,500	
			Sydney
Sydney Cricket Ground
Capacity: 48,000

== Test series ==
=== 1st Test ===
9–13 December 2026
Scorecard

Australia	v	New Zealand

Perth Stadium, Perth

=== 2nd Test ===
17–21 December 2026
Scorecard

Australia	v	New Zealand

Adelaide Oval, Adelaide

=== 3rd Test ===
26–30 December 2026
Scorecard

Australia	v	New Zealand

Melbourne Cricket Ground, Melbourne

=== 4th Test ===
4–8 January 2027
Scorecard

Australia	v	New Zealand

Sydney Cricket Ground, Sydney
