= Australian cricket team in New Zealand in 2023–24 =

International cricket tour

Australian cricket team in New Zealand in 2024
	New Zealand	Australia
- Dates: 21 February – 12 March 2024
Captains	Tim Southee (Tests); Mitchell Santner (T20Is)	Pat Cummins (Tests); Mitchell Marsh (Note: Matthew Wade captained Australia in the last T20I.) (T20Is)

Test series
- Result: Australia won the 2-match series 2–0
Most runs	Rachin Ravindra (145)	Cameron Green (238)
Most wickets	Matt Henry (17)	Nathan Lyon (13)
- Player of the series: Matt Henry (NZ)

Twenty20 International series
- Results: Australia won the 3-match series 3–0
Most runs	Glenn Phillips (101)	Travis Head (102)
Most wickets	Lockie Ferguson (5); Mitchell Santner (5)	Adam Zampa (5)
- Player of the series: Mitchell Marsh (Aus)

The Australia cricket team toured New Zealand in February and March 2024 to play three Twenty20 International (T20I) matches and two Test matches. The teams contested the Trans-Tasman Trophy, with the Test series formed part of the 2023–2025 ICC World Test Championship.

The teams contested the Chappell–Hadlee Trophy, with the T20I series formed part of both teams' preparation for the T20 World Cup in June that year which will be held in the USA and West Indies. It was the first time the T20I series was a part of Chappell–Hadlee Trophy. Australia won the first two T20Is, and retained the Chappell–Hadlee Trophy.

== Squads ==
New Zealand		Australia	
T20Is	Tests	T20Is	Tests
Mitchell Santner (c); Finn Allen; Trent Boult; Chad Bowes; Mark Chapman; Josh Clarkson; Devon Conway (wk); Jacob Duffy; Lockie Ferguson; ~~Matt Henry~~; Adam Milne; Glenn Phillips; Rachin Ravindra; Ben Sears; Tim Seifert (wk); Ish Sodhi; Tim Southee; Will Young	Tim Southee (c); Tom Blundell (wk); ~~Devon Conway (wk)~~; Matt Henry; Scott Kuggeleijn; Tom Latham; Daryl Mitchell; Henry Nicholls; William O'Rourke; Glenn Phillips; Rachin Ravindra; Mitchell Santner; Ben Sears; ~~Neil Wagner~~; Kane Williamson; Will Young	Mitchell Marsh (c); Pat Cummins; Tim David; Nathan Ellis; ~~Aaron Hardie~~; Josh Hazlewood; Travis Head; Josh Inglis (wk); Spencer Johnson; Glenn Maxwell; Matthew Short; Steve Smith; Mitchell Starc; ~~Marcus Stoinis~~; Matthew Wade (wk); David Warner; Adam Zampa	Pat Cummins (c); Scott Boland; Alex Carey (wk); Cameron Green; Josh Hazlewood; Travis Head; Usman Khawaja; Marnus Labuschagne; Nathan Lyon; Mitchell Marsh; Michael Neser; Matthew Renshaw; Steve Smith; Mitchell Starc

Tim Southee was only selected for the first T20I, while Trent Boult was selected for the last two T20Is in New Zealand's squad. On 18 February 2024, Matt Henry and Tim Seifert were ruled out of T20I series due to injuries, with Ben Sears and Will Young were named their respective replacements. On 24 February 2024, Chad Bowes was added to New Zealand's squad for the last T20I. Devon Conway was ruled out from third T20I due to injury. Jacob Duffy and Tim Seifert, who was ruled out earlier, passed a fitness test, added to the New Zealand's squad.

On 17 February 2024, Aaron Hardie replaced injured Marcus Stoinis in the Australia's T20I squad. However, the following day, Hardie was ruled out due to an injury, and replaced by Spencer Johnson in Australia's T20I squad. On 24 February 2024, David Warner was ruled out from third T20I due to injury.

On 27 February 2024, Neil Wagner announced his retirement from international cricket. On 28 February 2024, Devon Conway was ruled out of the first Test due to left thumb injury. Henry Nicholls was named as his replacement. On 4 March 2024, Conway was also ruled out of the second test, and Ben Sears was added to New Zealand's Test squad as a replacement for William O'Rourke who was ruled out due to hamstring injury.

== T20I series ==
=== 1st T20I ===
21 February 2024
19:10 (N)
Scorecard

New Zealand; 215/3 (20 overs)	v	Australia; 216/4 (20 overs)
Rachin Ravindra 68 (35); Mitchell Marsh 1/21 (3 overs)		Mitchell Marsh 72* (44); Mitchell Santner 2/42 (4 overs)

Australia won by 6 wickets
Sky Stadium, Wellington
Umpires: Shaun Haig (NZ) and Wayne Knights (NZ)
Player of the match: Mitchell Marsh (Aus)

- New Zealand won the toss and elected to bat.
- Josh Clarkson (NZ) made his T20I debut.

=== 2nd T20I ===
23 February 2024
19:10 (N)
Scorecard

Australia; 174 (19.5 overs)	v	New Zealand; 102 (17 overs)
Travis Head 45 (22); Lockie Ferguson 4/12 (3.5 overs)		Glenn Phillips 42 (35); Adam Zampa 4/34 (4 overs)

Australia won by 72 runs
Eden Park, Auckland
Umpires: Chris Brown (NZ) and Shaun Haig (NZ)
Player of the match: Pat Cummins (Aus)

- New Zealand won the toss and elected to field.

=== 3rd T20I ===
25 February 2024
13:00
Scorecard

Australia; 118/4 (10.4 overs)	v	New Zealand; 98/3 (10 overs)
Travis Head 33 (30); Josh Clarkson 1/8 (1 over)		Glenn Phillips 40* (24); Spencer Johnson 1/10 (2 overs)

Australia won by 27 runs (DLS method)
Eden Park, Auckland
Umpires: Chris Brown (NZ) and Wayne Knights (NZ)
Player of the match: Matthew Short (Aus)

- New Zealand won the toss and elected to field.
- The play was stopped during Australia's innings at 10.4 overs and match was reduced to 10 overs.
- New Zealand were set a revised target of 126 runs from 10 overs due to rain.
- Mitchell Santner (NZ) played in his 100th T20I.
- This was Australia's 100th win in T20Is.

== Test series ==
=== 1st Test ===
29 February–3 March 2024
Scorecard

Australia	v	New Zealand
383 (115.1 overs); Cameron Green 174* (275); Matt Henry 5/70 (30.1 overs)		179 (43.1 overs); Glenn Phillips 71 (70); Nathan Lyon 4/43 (8.1 overs)
164 (51.1 overs); Nathan Lyon 41 (46); Glenn Phillips 5/45 (16 overs)		196 (64.4 overs); Rachin Ravindra 59 (105); Nathan Lyon 6/65 (27 overs)

Australia won by 172 runs
Basin Reserve, Wellington
Umpires: Marais Erasmus (SA) and Michael Gough (Eng)
Player of the match: Cameron Green (Aus)

- New Zealand won the toss and elected to field.
- Australia's first innings tenth wicket partnership of 116 was the highest by any team against New Zealand.
- Glenn Phillips took his first Test five-wicket haul.
- World Test Championship points: Australia 12, New Zealand 0

=== 2nd Test ===
8–11 March 2024
Scorecard

New Zealand	v	Australia
162 (45.2 overs); Tom Latham 38 (69); Josh Hazlewood 5/31 (13.2 overs)		256 (68 overs); Marnus Labuschagne 90 (147); Matt Henry 7/67 (23 overs)
372 (108.2 overs); Rachin Ravindra 82 (153); Pat Cummins 4/62 (24 overs)		281/7 (65 overs); Alex Carey 98* (123); Ben Sears 4/90 (17 overs)

Australia won by 3 wickets
Hagley Oval, Christchurch
Umpires: Marais Erasmus (SA) and Nitin Menon (Ind)
Player of the match: Alex Carey (Aus)

- Australia won the toss and elected to field.
- Ben Sears (NZ) made his Test debut.
- Tim Southee and Kane Williamson (NZ) both played in their 100th Test, and Tim Southee became the fourth cricketer to play in 100 matches in all three formats of international cricket.
- Marnus Labuschagne (Aus) played in his 50th Test.
- Marais Erasmus (SA) stood in his final Test.
- Matt Henry's 7/67 were the best figures against Australia in New Zealand.
- Alex Carey equalled Adam Gilchrist's Australian Test record of 10 catches in a match.
- World Test Championship points: Australia 12, New Zealand 0
