= New Zealand cricket team in Australia in 2001–02 =

The New Zealand cricket team in Australia in 2001–02 played 5 first-class matches including 3 Tests. New Zealand also played in an LOI tri-series against Australia and South Africa.

== Test series summary ==
=== 1st Test ===
8–12 November 2001
(5-day match)
Scorecard

Australia	v	New Zealand
9/486d (131 overs); ML Hayden 136 (195); CL Cairns 5/146 (37 overs)		8/287d (88.4 overs); NJ Astle 66 (161); B Lee 5/67 (23 overs)
2/84d (14 overs); RT Ponting 32* (29); CL Cairns 1/29 (5 overs)		6/274 (57 overs); MH Richardson 57 (69); SP Fleming 57 (73); SK Warne 3/89 (18 overs)

Match drawn
Brisbane Cricket Ground, Woolloongabba, Brisbane
Umpires: SA Bucknor (WI) and DJ Harper (AUS)
Player of the match: B Lee (AUS)

- New Zealand won the toss and elected to field.

=== 2nd Test ===
22–26 November 2001
(5-day match)
Scorecard

Australia	v	New Zealand
8/558d (124 overs); RT Ponting 157* (218); DL Vettori 5/138 (36 overs)		7/243 (105.2 overs); SP Fleming 71 (184); JN Gillespie 2/45 (28 overs)

Match drawn
Bellerive Oval, Hobart
Umpires: SA Bucknor (WI) and SJ Davis (AUS) (replaced by JH Smeaton after the 1st day)
Player of the match: RT Ponting (AUS)

- New Zealand won the toss and elected to field.
- SE Bond (NZ) made his Test debut.

=== 3rd Test ===
30 November–4 December 2001
(5-day match)
Scorecard

New Zealand	v	Australia
9/534d (162.5 overs); NJ Astle 156* (275); B Lee 4/125 (32.5 overs)		351 (103.4 overs); SK Warne 99 (157); DL Vettori 6/87 (34.4 overs)
9/256d (71 overs); L Vincent 54 (54); B Lee 4/56 (16 overs)		7/381 (110 overs); ME Waugh 86 (158); DL Vettori 2/142 (45 overs)

Match drawn
WACA Ground, Perth
Umpires: DB Hair (AUS) and ID Robinson (ZIM)
Player of the match: DL Vettori (NZ)

- New Zealand won the toss and elected to bat.
- L Vincent (NZ) made his Test debut.

== See also ==
- 2001–02 VB Series
