= Australian cricket team in New Zealand in 1992–93 =

International cricket tour

The Australia national cricket team toured New Zealand from February to March 1993 and played a three-match Test series against the New Zealand national cricket team. The Test series was drawn 1–1. New Zealand were captained by Martin Crowe and Australia by Allan Border. In addition, the teams played a five-match series of Limited Overs Internationals (LOI) which Australia won 3–2.

== Test series summary ==
=== 1st Test ===
25–28 February 1993
(5-day match)
Scorecard

Australia	v	New Zealand
485 (157.3 overs); AR Border 88 (182); MB Owens 3/58 (26 overs)		182 (86 overs); KR Rutherford 57 (81); SK Warne 3/23 (22 overs)
		243 (f/o) (94.5 overs); KR Rutherford 102 (215); MG Hughes 4/62 (24.5 overs)

Australia won by an innings and 60 runs
Lancaster Park, Christchurch
Umpires: BL Aldridge and CE King
Player of the match: SK Warne (AUS)

- New Zealand won the toss and elected to field.
- The match was scheduled for five days but completed in four.

=== 2nd Test ===
4–8 March 1993
(5-day match)
Scorecard

New Zealand	v	Australia
329 (135 overs); MD Crowe 98 (188); CJ McDermott 3/66 (31 overs)		298 (101.4 overs); SR Waugh 75 (149); DK Morrison 7/89 (26.4 overs)
210/7 (115 overs); TE Blain 51 (170); CJ McDermott 3/54 (23 overs)

Match drawn
Basin Reserve, Wellington
Umpires: BL Aldridge and RS Dunne
Player of the match: DK Morrison (NZ)

- Australia won the toss and elected to field.

=== 3rd Test ===
12–16 March 1993
(5-day match)
Scorecard

Australia	v	New Zealand
139 (55.4 overs); SR Waugh 41 (77); DK Morrison 6/37 (18.4 overs)		224 (95.5 overs); KR Rutherford 43 (89); SK Warne 4/8 (15 overs)
285 (106 overs); DR Martyn 74 (99); DN Patel 5/93 (34 overs)		201/5 (72.4 overs); KR Rutherford 53* (95); SK Warne 2/54 (27 overs)

New Zealand won by 5 wickets
Eden Park, Auckland
Umpires: BL Aldridge and CE King
Player of the match: KR Rutherford (NZ) and DK Morrison (NZ)

- Australia won the toss and elected to bat.

== One Day Internationals (ODIs) ==
Australia won the Bank of New Zealand Trophy 3-2.

=== 1st ODI ===
19 March 1993
Scorecard

Australia; 258/4 (50 overs)	v	New Zealand; 129 (42.2 overs)
MA Taylor 78 (122); GR Larsen 1/44 (10 overs)		AH Jones 24 (60); AIC Dodemaide 4/20 (10 overs)

Australia won by 129 runs
Carisbrook, Dunedin
Umpires: RS Dunne and CE King
Player of the match: AIC Dodemaide (AUS)

- New Zealand won the toss and elected to field.
- JW Wilson (NZ) made his ODI debut.

=== 2nd ODI ===
21, 22 March 1993
Scorecard

New Zealand; 196/8 (45 overs)	v	Australia; 197/9 (44.3 overs)
TE Blain 41 (65); PR Reiffel 4/38 (10 overs)		ME Waugh 57 (80); CZ Harris 2/36 (9 overs)

Australia won by 1 wicket
Lancaster Park, Christchurch
Umpires: RS Dunne and DM Quested
Player of the match: PR Reiffel (AUS)

- New Zealand won the toss and elected to bat.
- The match was reduced before play started from 50 overs to 45 overs per side.
- Reserve day used. Australia were 51/2 (13.3 overs) at the close of the scheduled day's play.

=== 3rd ODI ===
24 March 1993
Scorecard

New Zealand; 214 (50 overs)	v	Australia; 126 (37.2 overs)
MD Crowe 91* (105); AIC Dodemaide 2/38 (9 overs)		MA Taylor 50 (94); GR Larsen 3/17 (10 overs)

New Zealand won by 88 runs
Basin Reserve, Wellington
Umpires: CE King and DM Quested
Player of the match: GR Larsen (NZ)

- New Zealand won the toss and elected to bat.
- SK Warne (AUS) made his ODI debut.

=== 4th ODI ===
27 March 1993
Scorecard

Australia; 247/7 (50 overs)	v	New Zealand; 250/7 (49.4 overs)
ME Waugh 108 (131); DK Morrison 3/35 (9 overs)		MD Crowe 91 (101); PR Reiffel 2/46 (10 overs)

New Zealand won by 3 wickets
Trust Bank Park, Hamilton
Umpires: BL Aldridge and DB Cowie
Player of the match: MD Crowe (NZ)

- Australia won the toss and elected to bat.

=== 5th ODI ===
28 March 1993
Scorecard

Australia; 232/8 (50 overs)	v	New Zealand; 229/8 (50 overs)
ME Waugh 83 (83); RT Latham 5/32 (10 overs)		MJ Greatbatch 68 (100); SR Waugh 2/27 (8 overs)

Australia won by 3 runs
Eden Park, Auckland
Umpires: BL Aldridge and DB Cowie
Player of the match: ME Waugh (AUS)

- New Zealand won the toss and elected to field.
