= New Zealand cricket team in Australia in 1987–88 =

International cricket tour

The New Zealand national cricket team toured Australia in the 1987-88 season and played 3 Test matches against Australia. Australia won the series 1-0 with two matches drawn.

== Test series summary ==
=== First Test ===
4–7 December 1987
(5-day match)
Scorecard

New Zealand	v	Australia
186 (93.2 overs); MD Crowe 67 (163); CJ McDermott 4/43 (22.2 overs)		305 (117.5 overs); DC Boon 143 (255); DK Morrison 4/86 (28 overs)
212 (79 overs); DN Patel 62 (141); BA Reid 4/53 (25 overs)		97/1 (32.1 overs); DM Jones 38* (49); JG Bracewell 1/32 (13 overs)

Australia won by 9 wickets
Brisbane Cricket Ground, Woolloongabba, Brisbane
Umpires: AR Crafter and MW Johnson
Player of the match: DC Boon (AUS)

- Australia won the toss and elected to field.
- The match was scheduled for five days but completed in four.
- MRJ Veletta (AUS) and DK Morrison (NZ) made their Test debuts.

=== Second Test ===
11–15 December 1987
(5-day match)
Scorecard

New Zealand	v	Australia
485/9d (174.5 overs); AH Jones 150 (383); CJ McDermott 4/135 (45.5 overs)		496 (195 overs); AR Border 205 (485); RJ Hadlee 5/68 (42 overs)
182/7 (85 overs); AH Jones 64 (137); PR Sleep 3/61 (32 overs)

Match drawn
Adelaide Oval, Adelaide
Umpires: RC Bailhache and SG Randell
Player of the match: AR Border (AUS)

- New Zealand won the toss and elected to bat.
- TBA May (AUS) made his Test debut.

=== Third Test ===
26–30 December 1987
(5-day match)
Scorecard

New Zealand	v	Australia
317 (110.3 overs); JG Wright 99 (223); CJ McDermott 5/97 (35 overs)		357 (145.4 overs); PR Sleep 90 (256); RJ Hadlee 5/109 (44 overs)
286 (92.3 overs); MD Crowe 79 (111); AIC Dodemaide 6/58 (28.3 overs)		230/9 (92 overs); DC Boon 54 (121); RJ Hadlee 5/67 (31 overs)

Match drawn
Melbourne Cricket Ground, Melbourne
Umpires: AR Crafter and RA French
Player of the match: RJ Hadlee (NZ)

- Australia won the toss and elected to field.
- AIC Dodemaide (AUS) made his Test debut.

== External sources ==
CricketArchive
