= New Zealand cricket team in Australia in 1989–90 =

International cricket tour

The New Zealand national cricket team toured Australia in the 1989-90 season and played one Test match against Australia.

The New Zealanders had a brief tour of Australia playing two first class matches and a Test at Perth. The match ended in a draw.

== Test series summary ==
24–28 November 1989
(5-day match)
Scorecard

Australia	v	New Zealand
9/521d (158.1 overs); DC Boon 200 (326); MC Snedden 4/108 (42 overs)		231 (92.4 overs); MJ Greatbatch 76 (139); MG Hughes 4/51 (20 overs)
		7/322 (162 overs); MJ Greatbatch 146* (485); MG Hughes 3/92 (36 overs)

Match drawn
Western Australia Cricket Association Ground, Perth
Umpires: RJ Evans and PJ McConnell
Player of the match: MJ Greatbatch (NZ)

- New Zealand won the toss and elected to field.
- TM Moody (AUS) and CL Cairns (NZ) made their Test debuts.

== External sources ==
CricketArchive
