= Simon Cook (Australian cricketer) =

Australian cricketer

Cricket information
- Batting: Left-handed
- Bowling: Right-arm fast-medium

International information
- National side: Australia
- Test debut (cap 373): 20 November 1997 v New Zealand
- Last Test: 27 November 1997 v New Zealand

Domestic team information
- Years: Team
- 1993/94–1994/95: Victoria
- 1995/96–2000/01: New South Wales

Career statistics
Competition	Test	FC	LA
Matches	2	32	16
Runs scored	3	174	22
Batting average	–	8.69	3.66
100s/50s	0/0	0/00	0/0
Top score	3*	27	11*
Balls bowled	224	4,821	730
Wickets	7	84	15
Bowling average	20.28	30.82	37.13
5 wickets in innings	1	2	0
10 wickets in match	0	0	0
Best bowling	5/39	5/39	4/42
Catches/stumpings	0/–	5/–	7/–
- Source: ESPNCricinfo, 2 July 2019

Simon Hewitt Cook (born 29 January 1972) is an Australian former cricketer.

After graduating from the Australian Cricket Academy, he debuted for Victoria early in 1993. He showed promise in the 1993–94 season, taking 30 wickets at 29.5.

He moved to New South Wales in the 1995–96 season. He was a surprise selection in two Test matches against New Zealand late in 1997, despite being considered by some to be not even up to first-class standard. On his debut, he took five wickets in the second innings against New Zealand in Perth.

Soon after his two Tests, which yielded a respectable bowling average of 20 as a replacement for Glenn McGrath, Cook disappeared off the scene fairly quickly due to injuries. He did play four more Sheffield Shield games in that 1997–98 season, including two four-wicket hauls, but in 1998–99 played just two games for just one wicket. He missed the entire 1999–2000 first-class season, and his next match in December 2000 turned out to be his last in the Pura Cup/Sheffield Shield.

Cook retired from all forms of cricket at the end of the 2003–04 season, playing with Victorian Premier Cricket's Melbourne Cricket Club.
