= 2003–04 Sheffield Shield season =

Australian cricket tournament

- Cricket format: First-class
- Tournament format(s): Double round-robin & Final
- Champions: Victoria (26th title)
- Participants: 6
- Matches: 31
- Player of the series: Matthew Elliott (Vic)
- Most runs: Matthew Elliott (1,381)
- Most wickets: Matthew Nicholson (39)

The 2003–04 Sheffield Shield season known as the Pura Cup was the 102nd season of the Sheffield Shield, the domestic first-class cricket competition of Australia. Victoria won the championship.

== Table ==
Team	Played	Won	Lost	Tied	Drawn	N/R	Points
Victoria	10	6	0	0	4	0	40
Queensland	10	3	3	0	4	0	24
Tasmania	10	3	1	0	6	0	24
Western Australia	10	3	3	0	4	0	21
New South Wales	10	2	6	0	2	0	17
South Australia	10	2	6	0	2	0	12

== Final ==
12–16 March 2004
Scorecard

(H) Victoria	v	Queensland
710 (212 overs); Matthew Elliott 155 (302); Ashley Noffke 3/104 (31 overs)		275 (105.5 overs); Jimmy Maher 72 (184); Cameron White 4/66 (30 overs)
1/140d (30 overs); Jason Arnberger 72 (89); Nathan Hauritz 1/54 (8 overs)		254 (68.3 overs); Stuart Law 72 (114); Mick Lewis 6/59 (17.3 overs)

Victoria won by 321 runs
Venue: Melbourne Cricket Ground, Melbourne
Umpires: Peter Parker and Bob Parry
Player of the match: Matthew Elliot

- Queensland won the toss and elected to field.

== Statistics ==
=== Most runs ===
Player	Team	Mat	Inns	NO	Runs	Ave	HS	100	50
Matthew Elliott	Victoria	11	20	3	1381	81.23	182	7	3
Murray Goodwin	Western Australia	10	20	2	1183	65.72	201*	4	5
Stuart Law	Queensland	11	20	4	1053	65.81	203	2	6
Brad Hodge	Victoria	10	19	3	984	61.5	125	4	4
Marcus North	Western Australia	10	19	1	984	54.66	130*	3	5

=== Most wickets ===
Player	Team	Mat	Inns	Overs	Wkts	Ave	Econ	BBI	BBM	5	10
Matthew Nicholson	New South Wales	9	18	343.0	39	30.35	3.45	6/76	8/162	2	0
Damien Wright	Tasmania	9	17	362.5	37	26.48	2.70	5/43	7/63	1	0
Andrew Downton	Tasmania	10	20	373.5	37	36.56	3.61	5/71	5/71	1	0
Paul Rofe	South Australia	9	16	308.5	35	27.02	3.06	7/66	8/117	2	0
Mick Lewis	Victoria	9	17	312.3	34	27.85	3.03	6/59	7/125	2	0
