= Shane Warne =

Australian cricketer (1969–2022)

Shane Warne AO
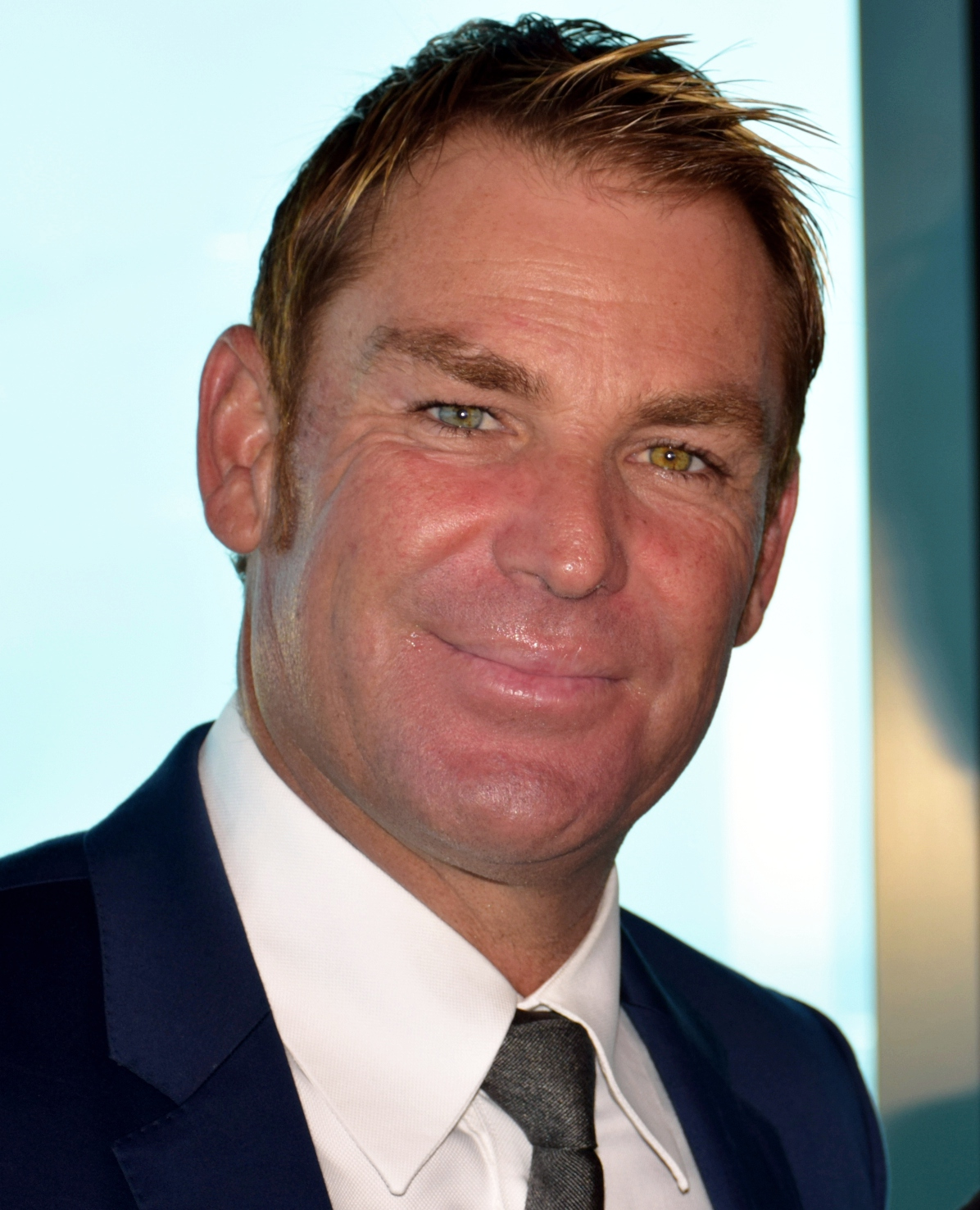
- Warne in 2015

Personal information
- Full name: Shane Keith Warne
- Born: 13 September 1969; Upper Ferntree Gully, Victoria, Australia
- Died: 4 March 2022 (aged 52); Ko Samui, Surat Thani, Thailand
- Nickname: Warnie, The King, King of Spin
- Height: 1.83 m (6 ft 0 in)
- Batting: Right-handed
- Bowling: Right-arm leg break
- Role: Bowler

International information
- National side: Australia (1992–2007)
- Test debut (cap 350): 2 January 1992 v India
- Last Test: 2 January 2007 v England
- ODI debut (cap 110): 24 March 1993 v New Zealand
- Last ODI: 10 January 2005 v Asia XI
- ODI shirt no.: 23

Domestic team information
- Years: Team
- 1990/91–2006/07: Victoria (squad no. 23)
- 2000–2007: Hampshire (squad no. 23)
- 2008–2012: Rajasthan Royals (squad no. 23)
- 2011/12–2012/13: Melbourne Stars (squad no. 23)

Career statistics
Competition	Test	ODI	FC	LA
Matches	145	194	301	311
Runs scored	3,154	1,018	6,919	1,879
Batting average	17.32	13.05	19.43	11.81
100s/50s	0/12	0/1	2/26	0/1
Top score	99	55	107*	55
Balls bowled	40,705	10,642	74,830	16,419
Wickets	708	293	1,319	473
Bowling average	25.41	25.73	26.11	24.61
5 wickets in innings	37	1	69	3
10 wickets in match	10	0	12	0
Best bowling	8/71	5/33	8/71	6/42
Catches/stumpings	125/–	80/–	264/–	126/–
Medal record
Men's Cricket
Representing Australia
ICC Cricket World Cup
Winner	1999 England-Wales -Ireland-Scotland-Netherlands
Runner-up	1996 India-Pakistan-Sri Lanka
- Source: ESPNcricinfo, 29 March 2008

Shane Keith Warne (13 September 1969 – 4 March 2022) was an Australian international cricketer whose career ran from 1992 to 2007. Warne played as a right-arm leg spin bowler and a lower-order right-handed batter for Victoria, Hampshire, the Melbourne Stars and Australia. Warne is regarded by many cricket players, statisticians and sporting analysts as not just the greatest ever leg spinner, but one of the greatest bowlers in the history of cricket. Warne also played for and coached the Rajasthan Royals, including captaining the team to victory in the inaugural season of the IPL.

He made 145 Test appearances, taking 708 wickets, and set the record for the most wickets taken by any bowler in Test cricket, a record he held until 2007. Warne was a useful lower-order batsman who scored more than 3,000 Test runs, with a highest score of 99. Warne was a member of the Australian team that won the 1999 Cricket World Cup. He retired from international cricket at the end of Australia's 2006–07 Ashes series victory over England.

Warne published his autobiography, No Spin, in 2018.

Warne revolutionised cricket thinking with his mastery of leg spin, then regarded as a dying art. After retirement, he regularly worked as a cricket commentator and for charities and endorsed commercial products. During his career, Warne was involved in off-field scandals including a ban from cricket for testing positive for a prohibited substance, a colourful personal life and interactions with gambling figures.

On 4 March 2022, Warne died of a heart attack at the age of 52, while on holiday in Thailand. After his death, many tributes and memorials were made to Warne, both in his home city of Melbourne and elsewhere in the cricketing world. Warne was posthumously appointed an Officer of the Order of Australia (AO) for his service to cricket.

== Early life ==
Warne was born in Upper Ferntree Gully, Victoria, a suburb of Melbourne, on 13 September 1969, the son of Brigitte (née Szczepiak) and Keith Warne. His mother was born in Germany of a German mother and a Polish father who had migrated to Germany as a teenager.

According to his autobiography, when Warne was in kindergarten, another boy jumped on his back and broke both his legs. He used a trolley powered by his arms to get around for 12 months, which he credited for his wrist strength.

He attended Hampton High School from Grades 7–9 before being offered a sports scholarship to attend Mentone Grammar, where he spent his final three years of school.

== Early career ==
Warne's first representative honours came in the 1983–84 season when he represented University of Melbourne Cricket Club in the Victorian Cricket Association's under-16 Dowling Shield competition. He bowled a mixture of leg-spin and off-spin, and was a handy lower-order batsman.

The following season, Warne joined St Kilda Cricket Club, which is located near his home suburb Black Rock. He started in the lower elevens and, over a number of seasons, progressed to the first eleven. During the cricket off-season in 1987, Warne played five games of Australian rules football for St Kilda Football Club's under-19s team. In 1988, Warne again played for the St Kilda Football Club's under-19 team before being promoted to the reserves team, one step below professional level, where he played a single game. The same year, he also kicked 7 goals in the under-19s in St Kilda's round 10 game against Hawthorn. Following the 1988 Victorian Football League season, St Kilda delisted Warne and he began to focus solely on cricket.

In 1989, Warne had a six-month stint in Bristol, playing for the Imperial Cricket Club in the Western League, where he took 49 wickets at 15.22. While playing in Bristol, Warne lived in the attic of the pavilion of the cricket club.

In 1990, Warne was chosen to train at the Australian Cricket Academy in Adelaide. Warne struggled with the discipline at the academy and left following disagreements with management.

In 1991, Warne joined Accrington Cricket Club of the Lancashire League as their professional player for that year's cricket season. After initially struggling in English conditions, he had a good season as a bowler, taking 73 wickets at 15.4 runs each but scored only 329 runs at an average of 15. The committee at Accrington decided not to re-engage Warne for the 1992 season because they expected their professional to contribute as both a batsman and bowler.

Warne was recalled to the Australian Cricket Academy in 1992, where he honed his leg spin abilities under former Australian Test spinner Terry Jenner. Jenner is credited with harnessing Warne's raw talents and coaching him to become more professional in his preparation and approach to the game.

Warne was selected for the Australia B team, which toured Zimbabwe in September 1991. In the second tour match at Harare Sports Club, Warne recorded his first first-class score of five wickets or more in an innings when he took 7/49 in the second innings, helping Australia B to a nine-wicket win. In December 1991, upon returning to Australia, Warne took 3/14 and 4/42 for Australia A against a touring West Indian team.

== Domestic career ==
Warne made his first-class cricket debut on 15 February 1991, taking 0/61 and 1/41 for Victoria against Western Australia at Junction Oval in Melbourne. Warne captained Victoria in the 1999–00 season and was appointed again for the 2002–03 season. Over his career, Warne made 76 appearances for Victoria and claimed 161 first-class wickets at 34.72 and 43 List A wickets at 27.93.

Warne signed a $400,000 contract to play for Hampshire County Cricket Club in England for the 2000 season. He returned to Hampshire as the captain for the seasons between 2004 and 2007. Warne made 139 total appearances for Hampshire. For Hampshire he scored his only two first-class centuries and took 276 wickets at an average of 25.58. He also claimed 120 wickets at 19.72 List A wickets for Hampshire.

== International career ==
=== Early international career (1992–1995) ===
Warne made his international debut on 2 January 1992 in the third Test match between Australia and India. Peter Taylor, the incumbent spinner in the Australian Test team, had taken only one wicket in the first two Tests, so Warne was brought into the team for the match at the Sydney Cricket Ground. Warne had played seven first-class matches before making his Test debut for Australia. He took 1/150 (Ravi Shastri caught by Dean Jones for 206) off 45 overs. Warne took 0/78 in the fourth Test in Adelaide, recording overall figures of 1/228 for the series, and was dropped for the fifth Test on the pace-friendly WACA Ground in Perth.

Australia toured Sri Lanka in mid-1992. Warne's poor form continued in the first innings against Sri Lanka at Colombo, in which he recorded 0/107. On 22 August 1992, however, Warne took the last three Sri Lankan wickets without conceding a run in the second innings, leading to a second-innings collapse and contributing to a 16-run Australian win. Sri Lankan captain Arjuna Ranatunga commented in an interview; "a bowler with Test average of more than 300 came and snatched the victory from our hands". Despite his match-winning spell, Warne was left out of the second Sri Lanka Test before taking 0/40 in the third-and-final Test of the series.

Warne was again left out of the First Test against the West Indies in the 1992–93 Australian season. Greg Matthews played in Warne's place; despite Australia being in a strong position on the final day, they could not dismiss the West Indies on a turning surface. Warne was recalled for the Second Test in Melbourne, a Boxing Day Test in which he took 7/52 in a match-winning performance in the second innings.

In February and March 1993, Warne took 17 wickets at an average of 15.05 in Australia's tour of New Zealand, tying Danny Morrison as the top wicket-taker for the series. On 24 March, Warne made his One Day International debut at Wellington, taking two wickets.

In 1993, Warne was selected for Australia's Ashes tour of England. His first ball of the series, at Old Trafford, was called the "Ball of the Century". Warne bowled experienced English batsman Mike Gatting, with a ball that drifted through the air and then turned from well outside leg stump to clip the off bail. Warne claimed 34 wickets in his first Ashes series, leading all bowlers, at an average of 25.79. Australia won the six Test series 4–1.

When New Zealand toured Australia for three Tests in November and December, Warne took 18 wickets and was named Player of the Series as Australia won the three Test series 2–0. Warne took 72 Test wickets in 1993, a then-record for a spin bowler in a calendar year. Almost all of the 72 wickets were English and New Zealand batsmen.

Warne featured in South Africa's tour of Australia in 1993–94 and Australia's return tour in March 1994. In the second Test of South Africa's tour at the Sydney Cricket Ground, Warne took ten wickets in a Test for the first time in his career. His 7/56 in the first innings and 5/72 in the second was not enough to secure victory for Australia; on the Test's final day, Warne was part of an Australian batting collapse and South Africa won the Test. Both of the three Test series were drawn 1–1. Warne was named one of the Wisden Cricketers of the Year in the 1994 Wisden Cricketers' Almanack.

Warne joined the Australian tour of Pakistan in September and October 1994, where Pakistan defeated Australia 1–0 in the three Test series. Warne collected 18 wickets at an average of 28.00 to lead all bowlers for the tour. The tour became controversial, however, when it emerged in early 1995 that the Pakistani captain, Saleem Malik, had approached Warne, Mark Waugh and Tim May to throw the game during the First Test. Malik was alleged to have offered Warne and May US$200,000 each to avoid taking wickets. The Australians did not accept the bribe, however Pakistan would narrowly win the game anyway, as Ian Healy missed a stumping down the leg side.

Australia sought to retain the Ashes when England toured for a five-Test series in 1994–95. Warne took a career-best 8/71 in the second innings of the first Test at Brisbane Cricket Ground (the Gabba), before taking 27 wickets in the five-Test series. In the Second Test, a Boxing Day Test at Melbourne Cricket Ground, he took his first and only Test hat-trick, dismissing tail-enders Phil DeFreitas, Darren Gough and Devon Malcolm in successive balls, the last of which was caught by David Boon. Warne also took his 150th Test wicket, a caught-and-bowled off Alec Stewart. In the Third Test at the Sydney Cricket Ground, he and fellow tail-ender Tim May survived the final 19 overs in fading light on the fifth day to secure a draw and a 2–0 series lead, that meant Australia would take an unassailable lead in the series.

=== West Indies tour, Cricket World Cup and injury (1995–1999) ===
Later in 1995, Warne toured the West Indies, taking 15 wickets in four Tests as Australia defeated the West Indies in a Test series for the first time in almost 20 years. Without Damien Fleming and Craig McDermott, Warne partnered with an inexperienced Glenn McGrath, Paul Reiffel and Brendon Julian. In a series dominated by the ball, the Windies did not pass 300 runs in any innings.

In the Australian summer of 1995–96, Australia played home series against Pakistan and Sri Lanka. Warne took 11 wickets in the first Test against Pakistan but broke his toe in the second. Selectors included him in the squad for the third Test days later to give him the chance to prove his fitness. Warne took four wickets in Pakistan's first innings and another four in their second, and was named the player of the series. Warne took 12 wickets against Sri Lanka across the three Tests. Australia won both series.

Warne was a key member of Australia's squad for the 1996 Cricket World Cup, which was held in India, Pakistan and Sri Lanka. Warne took 12 wickets, including a man of the match 4/36 in the semi-final against the West Indies, and Australia qualified for the final. Warne conceded 58 runs for no wickets in the final as Australia lost the match to first-time champions Sri Lanka.

The West Indies toured Australia for a five-Test series in the southern summer of 1996–97, which Australia won 3–2. Warne took 22 wickets in the series. In the One Day series, Warne collected his only ODI five-for, against the West Indies at the Sydney Cricket Ground, cleaning up the middle-order and tail to finish with 5/33.

Warne took 11 wickets in Australia's three Test tour of South Africa in early 1997 as Australia won 2–1. In the northern summer of 1997, Warne returned to England with the Australian team to play for the Ashes. After struggling for form early in the tour, he turned in his best results for the series in the Third Test at Old Trafford where he would bag nine wickets. In the Fifth Test at Trent Bridge, Warne claimed seven wickets as Australia clinched the Ashes. Warne took 24 wickets through the series at an average of 24.04 and finished second to paceman Glenn McGrath in the wicket-taking. Australia won the six Test series 3–2.

In the Australian summer of 1997–98, Warne took 19 wickets in New Zealand's three-Test series in Australia and 20 wickets in three Tests against South Africa, in the second of which he took five wickets in the first innings and six in the second, becoming the second Australian after Dennis Lillee to take 300 Test wickets. In late 1997, Australian media criticised Warne for his weight; however, The Australian wrote he was one of Australia's three most-influential cricketers, the others being Donald Bradman and Lillee.

In early 1998, Warne was a member of Australia's touring squad of India. Finding Indian food not to his liking, he had tinned spaghetti and baked beans flown in from Australia. Australia's two top pace bowlers Glenn McGrath and Jason Gillespie missed the tour due to injury, leaving Warne to bowl more overs than usual. He took 10 wickets but conceded 54 runs each, going for 0/147 in India's only innings of the second Test at Eden Gardens, Calcutta. Warne's dismissal of Rahul Dravid in the first innings of the final Test at Bangalore took him past Lance Gibbs' tally of 309 wickets, making Warne the most-successful spin bowler in Test Cricket. Australia lost the series, breaking a run of nine Test series wins.

Warne did not play international cricket in the later part of 1998, requiring shoulder reconstruction surgery.

In early December 1998, the Australian Cricket Board announced that three years earlier it had fined Warne and Mark Waugh for accepting money from a bookmaker for information about pitch and weather conditions during a 1994 ODI tour of Sri Lanka, in the 'John the bookmaker' controversy.

Warne missed Australia's tour of Pakistan and the first four Ashes Tests. During Warne's extended absence from the Australian team, his understudy Stuart MacGill played in his place, taking 15 wickets in three Tests against Pakistan and another series-high 27 wickets against England. Warne returned to international cricket in the fifth Test of the Ashes series in Australia in January 1999. Upon Warne's return, he and MacGill bowled in tandem to the team for the fifth Ashes Test at the Sydney Cricket Ground, where MacGill took twelve wickets and Warne two.

=== Vice-captaincy of Australia (1999–2000) ===
Shane Warne's record as captain
	Matches	Won	Lost	Drawn	Tied	No result	Win %
ODI	11	10	1	0	0	0	90.91%

The 1998–99 Ashes series was the last series for Australian captain Mark Taylor, who retired. Steve Waugh was appointed as Taylor's replacement while Warne was promoted to vice-captain.

In early 1999, Warne took two wickets in the first three Tests of the series against the West Indies, leading to calls for his removal from the team from Australian media. Warne had struggled for form since returning from his shoulder injury, and Stuart MacGill had outperformed him so far in the series. For the final Test, Warne was replaced by off-spinner Colin Miller, who with MacGill took eight wickets between them and Australia won the Test to retain the Frank Worrell Trophy. The selection decision was poorly received by Warne, and permanently strained his relationship with Waugh, nevertheless, Warne and Waugh were able to combine effectively for Australia for the remainder of their careers together. Warne's form recovered in the One Day International series against the West Indies, taking 13 wickets across seven matches.

Warne was selected to play in the 1999 World Cup in the United Kingdom. Just before the start of the 1999 World Cup, the International Cricket Council (ICC) fined Warne and gave him a two-match suspended ban after being quoted in the media speaking about Sri Lankan captain Arjuna Ranatunga, saying; "There is plenty of animosity between Arjuna and myself. I don't like him and I'm not in a club of one." Australia were attempting to win their first Cricket World Cup since 1987. Warne took 12 wickets in the group and Super Six phases of the tournament. Prior to Australia batting against South Africa in the Super Six phase, Warne addressed the team suggesting that after a catch, Herschelle Gibbs tended to throw the ball in celebration before controlling it and that batsmen should wait for the umpire to formally dismiss them. Gibbs dropped Steve Waugh in this fashion while the latter was on 56, and Waugh went on to score 120 not out to win the game for Australia. Australia qualified for a semi-final against South Africa at Edgbaston. The semi-final match became notable for the dramatic fashion in which it finished; with the match ending in a tie, and Australia advanced to the final on a countback. Warne dismissed key South African batsmen Gibbs, Gary Kirsten, Hansie Cronje and Jacques Kallis to finish with 4/29 for which he was named man of the match. Australia faced Pakistan in the tournament's final. Pakistan batted first and were all out for 132, as Warne took 4/33 and was named the man of the match. Australia comfortably reached the target to win the World Cup. Warne finished the World Cup with 20 wickets and was the tournament's joint-top wicket-taker alongside Geoff Allott.

Later in 1999, Warne was retained as Australia's vice-captain for Australia's tour of Sri Lanka, where he took eight wickets across three Tests, as Australia were defeated 1–0. The Australians toured Zimbabwe, where Warne took six wickets, as Australia won the only Test.

The following Australian summer, Warne played in all Tests of the series against Pakistan and India. He reached his highest score with the bat in the first Test against Pakistan in Brisbane, with 86. Warne's eight wickets in the Second Test at Hobart were overshadowed by the Joe the Cameraman controversy, in which an off-field microphone picked up a jibe about Australian bowler Scott Muller during the match, which some incorrectly attributed to Warne. Warne again made 86 in the first Test against India in Adelaide the following month. Warne took 18 wickets over the six summer Tests and Australia won both series 3–0 to complete a perfect Test summer.

Warne took another 15 wickets in Australia's tour of New Zealand in March 2000, as he assisted Australia to win the series 3–0. In the first Test of the series at Eden Park, Auckland, Warne surpassed Dennis Lillee's 355 wickets as Australia's leading-ever wicket-taker.

In 2000, Warne joined English county team Hampshire, for which he played during the year's northern summer. During the county season, reports Warne had repeatedly sent lewd SMS messages to an English nurse emerged. In August 2000, the ACB removed him as Australia's vice-captain, citing his history of off-field indiscretions. The board's decision was contrary to the wishes of the team's selectors, including captain Steve Waugh. Warne was replaced as vice-captain by Adam Gilchrist. That year, however, the ACB awarded Warne the Men's ODI Player of the Year at the Allan Border Medal ceremony.

=== Wickets and injuries (2001–2003) ===
Warne missed the entire Australian summer of 2000–01 with a finger injury; he battled Stuart MacGill and an in-form Colin Miller to be selected for Australia's tour of India in early 2001. MacGill was ultimately left out of the squad. Warne took 10 wickets over the three-Test series at an average of 50.50; his Indian spin counterpart Harbhajan Singh was the man of the series after taking 32 wickets at an average of 17.03. Australia lost the series 2–1.

In the English summer, Warne was selected for the 2001 Ashes, and took 31 wickets at 18.70 in the five-Test series, which Australia won 4–1. Warne again finished second to Glenn McGrath in the wickets, McGrath taking one more than Warne. He took three five-wicket hauls in the series and collected eight wickets in each of the First and Third Tests at Edgbaston and Trent Bridge respectively. In the final Test at The Oval, Warne took 11 wickets across both innings, including Alec Stewart for the 400th career Test wicket. Warne became the sixth person and the first Australian in the history of cricket to reach 400 wickets.

In the 2001–02 Australian summer, Australia played home series against New Zealand and against South Africa. Warne took six wickets in three Tests against New Zealand, and in the third Test in Perth made his career's highest batting score in international cricket. He was caught at mid-wicket off the bowling of Daniel Vettori, which later revealed to be a no-ball while on 99 runs—one run short of a maiden Test century. All three Tests ended as draws. He took 17 wickets in the three Tests against South Africa, more than any other player, including 5/113 in the first innings of the first Test. Warne, with 20 dismissals, was again the leading wicket-taker when Australia played a three-Test series in South Africa in February and March 2002. In February 2002, Ricky Ponting replaced Steve Waugh as captain of Australia's ODI squad. The promotion of Ponting, who was five years younger than Warne, appeared to end any prospect of Warne ever being appointed to the captaincy of Australia.

In October 2002, Australia played a three-Test series against Pakistan in neutral states Sri Lanka and the United Arab Emirates. Warne took 27 wickets, was named the Man of the Match in the First Test with 11 wickets, and again in the Third Test with eight wickets. He was also selected as the Player of the Series.

He returned to Australia for the 2002–03 Ashes series against England, starting in November 2002. In the first Test, he scored 57 with the bat and took 14 wickets in the first three Tests of the series but suffered a shoulder injury in an ODI in December 2002. Warne would not play another Test for Australia until March 2004. The injury ruled him out of the remainder of the Ashes series and he was in doubt for the 2003 World Cup, which began in February 2003.

=== Ban from cricket (2003) ===
In February 2003, a day before the start of the World Cup in Africa, Warne was sent home after a drug test during a one-day series in Australia returned a positive result for a banned diuretic. Warne said he took only one of what he called a "fluid tablet", the prescription drug Moduretic, which his mother had given him to improve his appearance. A committee established by the ACB found Warne guilty of breaching the board's drug code and imposed a one-year ban from organised cricket.

After having announced he would retire from ODIs after the 2003 World Cup, Warne took the view the ban would lengthen his Test-playing career, although it led him to briefly reconsider his decision to retire from ODIs. Warne was allowed to play in charity matches while serving his one-year ban, a decision that was criticised by the World Anti-Doping Agency (WADA), which Warne criticised for interfering in the matter.

During his suspension, Australia's main free-to-air cricket broadcaster Nine Network hired Warne as a television commentator. During mid-2003, Warne worked for the St Kilda Football Club, an Australian rules football club, in an unpaid consultancy role after the Australian Football League banned him from holding an official club position because of his drugs ban.

=== Return to cricket and beyond 600 Test wickets (2004–2006) ===
Warne returned to competitive cricket following his ban in February 2004. In March, in the first Test of a three-Test series against Sri Lanka in Galle, he became the second cricketer after Courtney Walsh to take 500 Test wickets. Warne took five wickets in each innings of the first and second Tests, and a further six wickets in the third Test, and was named the player of the series.

In 2004 Sri Lanka toured Australia for a mid-year return series in Darwin and Cairns. Warne took 10 wickets at 28 runs in the series.

On 15 October 2004, during the second Test of Australia's series against India at Chennai, he broke the record for most career wickets in Test cricket. Warne's dismissal of Irfan Pathan, who was caught at slip by Matthew Hayden, saw him overtake his Sri Lankan rival Muttiah Muralidaran with 533 wickets. Muralidaran, who was injured at the time, had taken the record from Courtney Walsh five months earlier. Australia won the series 2–1; it was Australia's first series win in India since 1969. Warne's 14 wickets at an average of 30.07 was an improvement on his previous performances in India, when in six Tests he took 20 wickets at an average of 52 runs each. For his performances in 2004, the ICC named him in the World Test XI.

Warne took 11 wickets at 23.27 against the touring New Zealanders to start the 2004–05 home summer as Australia won the two-Test series 2–0. Warne led the wicket-taking of both teams, ahead of Daniel Vettori. Pakistan then toured, and Warne took 14 wickets at 28.71 as Australia completed a 3–0 sweep.

Australia then embarked on a return tour of New Zealand where they won the three-Test series 2–0. Warne bowled his way to 17 wickets through the series at an average of 22 runs per wicket.

Warne started the 2005 Ashes with six wickets at Lord's, with Australia taking a 1–0 lead after defeating England by 239 runs. Warne claimed 10 wickets in the Second Test at Edgbaston, including six in the second innings. He also contributed 42 runs in the second innings, as Australia were defeated by just two runs. In his second innings performance, Warne delivered one of his sharpest spinning deliveries to Andrew Strauss, which deviated from approximately 60 centimetres outside Strauss' off stump to bowl the left-hander's middle and leg stumps behind his legs. On 11 August 2005 in the Third Ashes Test at Old Trafford, Warne became the first bowler in history to take 600 Test wickets. In the same Test, Warne made 90 first innings runs, helping Australia avoid the follow-on and eventually draw the match. Warne again contributed with both bat and ball in the Fourth Test at Trent Bridge, taking eight wickets and scoring 45 runs in Australia's second innings, at faster than a run per ball. Warne's efforts in Nottingham came close to bowling Australia to a memorable victory after following-on, however England emerged victorious by three wickets to take a lead for the first time in the series. In the Fifth and Final Test at The Oval, Warne took six wickets in each innings and 12 for the match. Warne also dropped a straightforward slips chance off Kevin Pietersen while he was on 15, with the English batsman going on to make 158 and England holding on to draw the match and win the series for the first time since 1986–87. Warne's ferocious competitiveness was a feature of the 2005 Ashes series in which he took 40 wickets at an average of 19.92 and scored 249 runs. Warne shared the Ashes Player of the Series honours with England's Andrew Flintoff.

During the 2005–06 Australian home summer, Warne bowled impressively against the touring World XI, West Indies and South African teams. In the only Test against the World XI at the Sydney Cricket Ground, Warne took six wickets across both innings, being out-bowled by Stuart MacGill, who claimed nine. Australia won the Test by 210 runs. Against the West Indies, Warne collected 16 wickets across three Tests, with a best innings performance of 6/80 at the Adelaide Oval as the selectors partnered him again with fellow leg spinner, MacGill. Warne also performed strongly against the touring South Africans, leading the Australian wicket-takers with 14 wickets at an average of 33.00.

For his performances in 2005, the ICC named Warne in the World Test Team of the Year XI. In 2005, with 96 wickets, Warne broke the record for the number of wickets in a calendar year.

=== Later international career, 700th Test wicket and retirement (2006–2007) ===
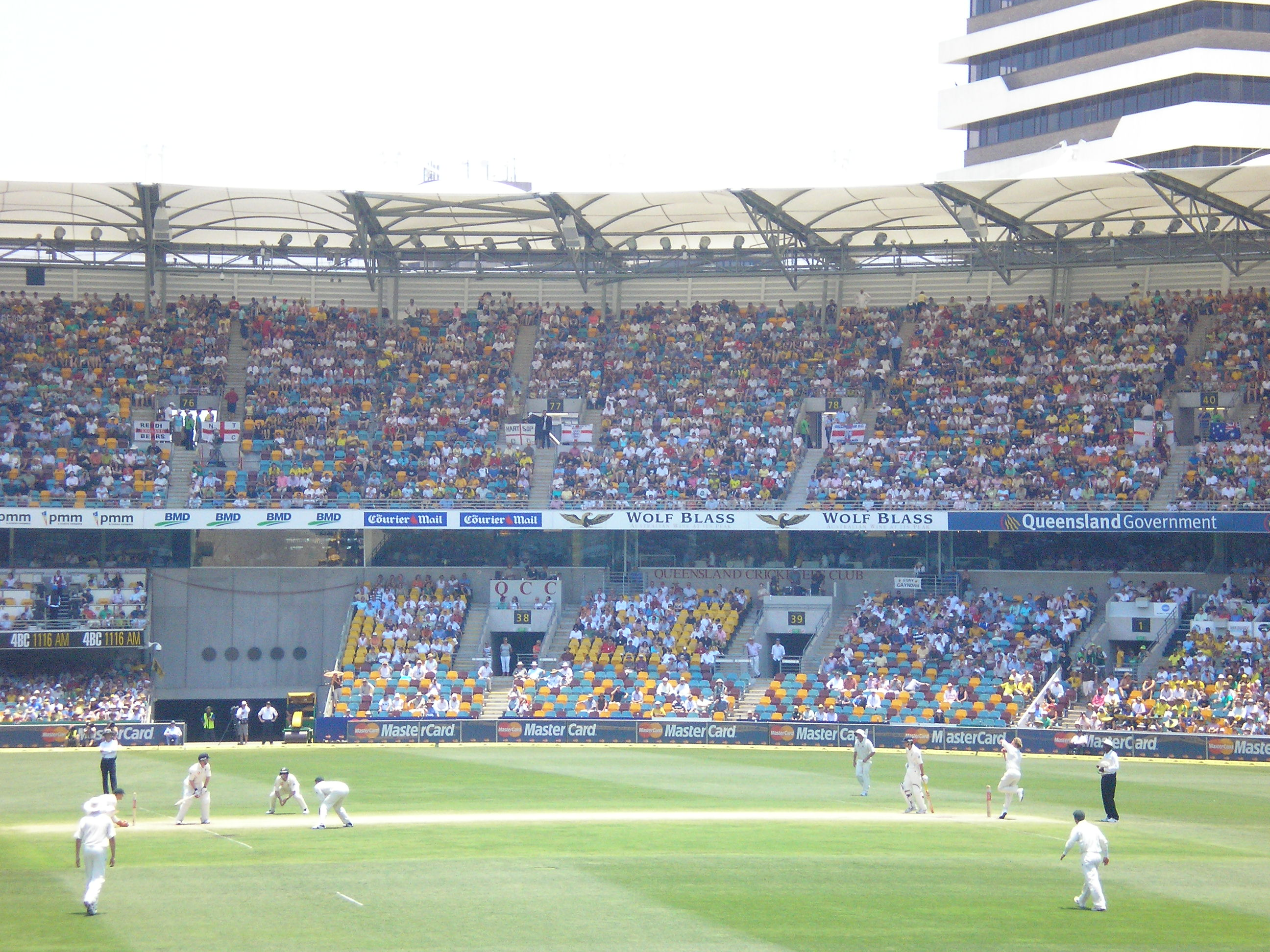
Warne (right) bowling to Ian Bell at the Gabba in Brisbane in 2006

Warne toured South Africa with the Australian team for a three Test series in March–April 2006, collecting 15 wickets. Warne took his series-best figures of 6/86 in the second Test at Durban, helping bowl Australia to victory by 112 runs and claiming Man of the Match honours. Following this, he joined the Australian team for a two-Test series against Bangladesh, taking 11 wickets in the series, again paired with Stuart MacGill on spin-friendly pitches.

Warne began the 2006–07 Ashes series with an indifferent Test performance in the first Test at Brisbane and a poor performance in the first innings of the second Test in Adelaide, where he took no wickets. However, his second-innings performance in Adelaide of 4/49 included bowling Kevin Pietersen around his legs, and triggered England's fifth-day collapse and Australia's win, in a game that had appeared destined for a draw. Warne again bowled well in the third Test's second innings, and took the final wicket of Monty Panesar as Australia regained the Ashes.

On 21 December 2006, Warne announced he would retire at the end of the 2006–07 Ashes series at the Sydney Cricket Ground. In front of his home crowd at the Melbourne Cricket Ground in his penultimate Test, he took his 700th Test wicket on 26 December 2006 by bowling English batsman Andrew Strauss in his final international appearance at the venue. This was the first occasion a player had taken 700 Test wickets. The wicket was described as a "classic Warne dismissal", to which the crowd of 89,155 gave a standing ovation. Warne finished Boxing Day with 5/39, his final Test five-for.

Warne's final Test was at the Sydney Cricket Ground, the same venue as where he had debuted for Australia 15 years earlier. Warne ended England's first innings by trapping Monty Panesar leg before wicket for a duck and took his 1,000th international wicket. Warne also made 71 runs in his final innings. Warne's final Test wicket was that of England's all-rounder Andrew Flintoff, who was stumped by Adam Gilchrist. Warne is one of only two bowlers to have taken more than 1,000 wickets in international cricket, the other being Muttiah Muralidaran. For his performances in 2006, the ICC and ESPNcricinfo named Warne in the World Test XI. Cricket Australia awarded Warne the 2006 Men's Test Player of the Year at the Allan Border Medal ceremony.

== Twenty20 career (2008–2013) ==
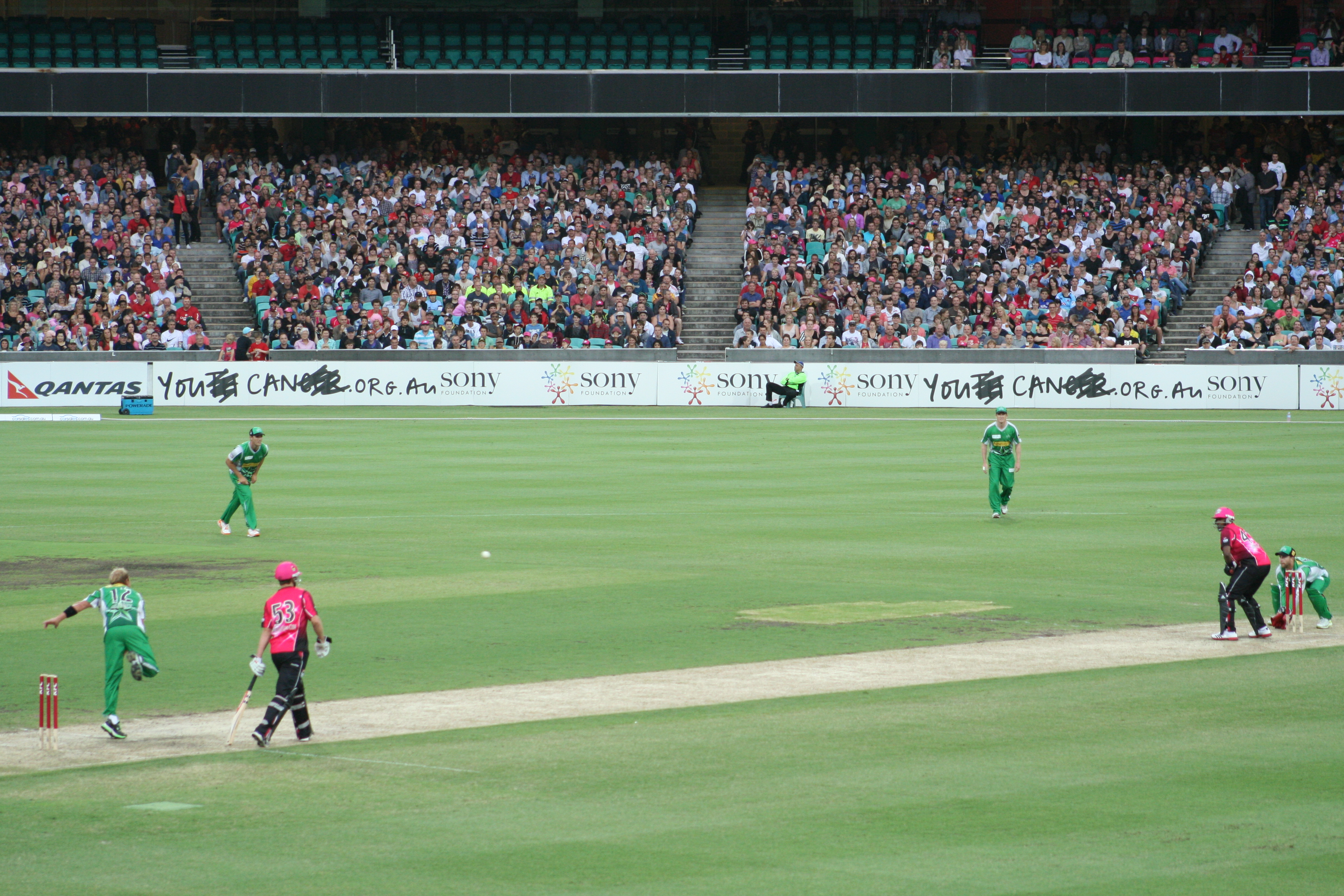
Warne bowling against the Sydney Sixers in 2011 during a Big Bash League match

After his retirement from international cricket, Warne was signed as the captain of Rajasthan Royals in the Indian Premier League (IPL) 2008, fetching US$450,000 in the pre-season player auction. Warne led the Royals to victory in the first season of the competition. He continued as captain of the Royals for a further four seasons; the 2011 season was his last with the franchise.

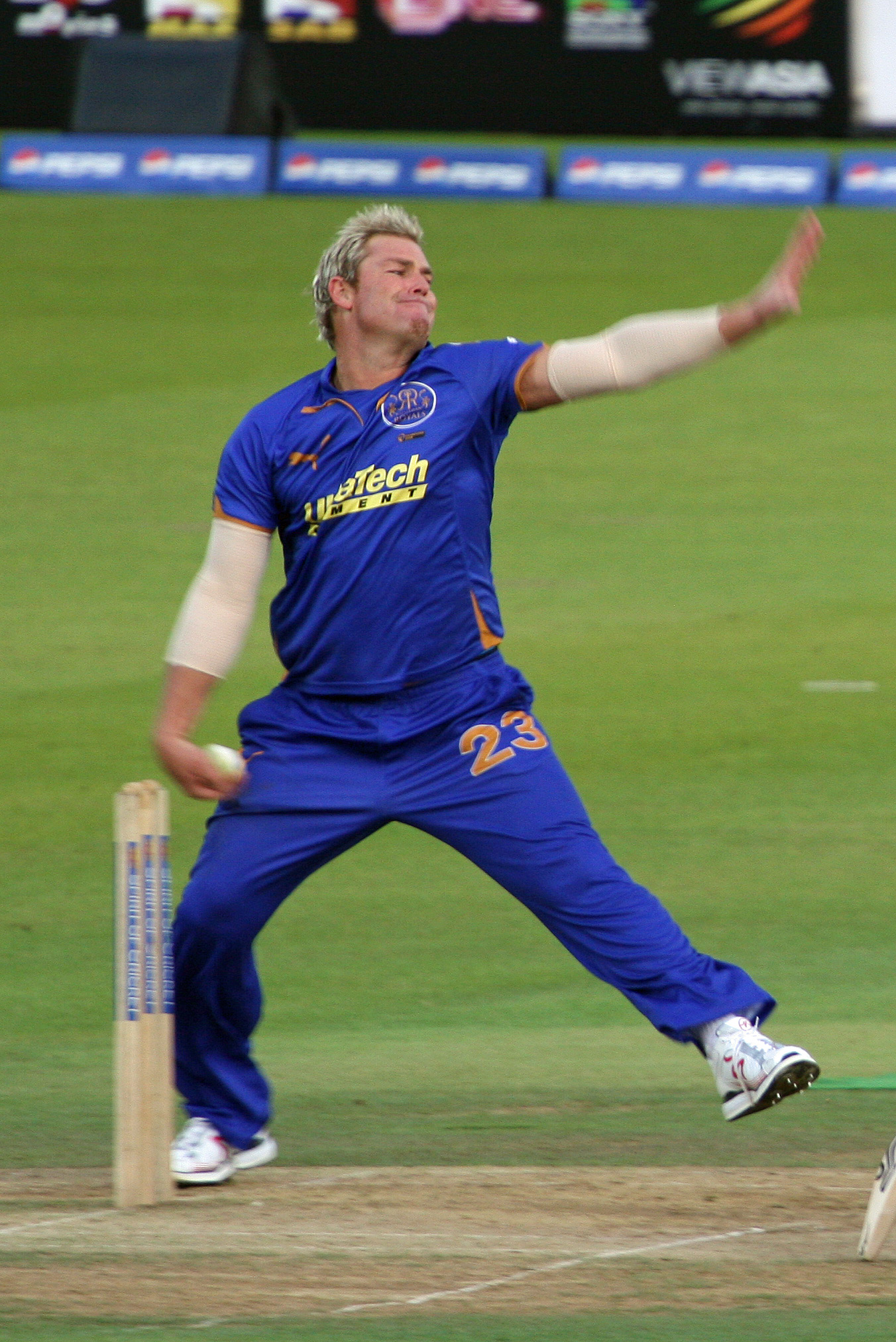
Warne bowling at Lord's for Rajasthan Royals in a Twenty20 match against Middlesex in 2009

Warne was signed as a player for Melbourne Stars in Australia's inaugural Big Bash League (BBL) in November 2011. The Stars qualified for the semi-finals of the tournament, in which Warne took seven wickets in eight matches at an economy rate of 6.74 runs conceded per over.

In 2013, Warne was fined $4500 and banned for one match for using obscene language, making "inappropriate physical contact with a player or official" Marlon Samuels and "showing serious dissent at an umpire's decision" during a BBL match against Melbourne Renegades. In July 2013, Warne officially retired from all formats of cricket, confirming he would no longer captain Melbourne Stars in the BBL.

In July 2014, Warne captained the Rest of the World team in the Bicentenary Celebration match at Lord's. In February 2018, Rajasthan Royals appointed Warne as their team mentor for the IPL 2018.

== Playing style ==
Warne is widely considered one of the greatest bowlers in cricket history. He revolutionised cricket with his mastery of leg spin, which many cricket followers had come to regard as a dying art due to the difficulty of accurately bowling the deliveries. Warne helped overturn the domination of cricket by fast bowling that had prevailed for twenty years before his debut. In the early 1970s, Australia's fast bowlers Dennis Lillee and Jeff Thomson dominated cricket. From around 1977 until the early 1990s, the West Indies lost only one ill-tempered and controversial Test series with a bowling attack almost exclusively composed of four fast bowlers. From the early 1990s, with the West Indies in decline, Waqar Younis and Wasim Akram of Pakistan were becoming the world's most-feared fast-bowling combination. In this context, Warne's bowling became significant. His dominance, particularly of English and South African batsmen, provided cricket audiences with an alternative skill.

Warne combined the ability to prodigiously turn the ball, even on unhelpful pitches, with regular accuracy and a variation of deliveries—notable among these is the flipper. In the later stages of his career, variation was less evident despite regular press conferences announcing a "new" delivery for each series he participated in.

Many of Warne's most spectacular performances occurred in Ashes series against England; in particular, the "Gatting Ball", better known as the "Ball of the Century", which drifted significantly out of the hand, pitching well outside leg stump and sharply spun past the front of the bat, clipping the top of Off Stump, bowling a bemused Mike Gatting in the 1993 Ashes series. Warne had struggled against India, particularly against Sachin Tendulkar; Warne's bowling average against India was 47.18 runs per wicket compared with his overall average of 25. Warne also was hit for the most sixes by the time he retired; Warne said he did not like to be hit for singles because he had to plan for two batsmen at the same over.

Warne was a fierce and dramatic competitor. Haigh wrote about what he called Warne's pageantry and measured theatricality, including his exaggerated appeals, intimidation of batters, sledging, flirting with umpires, and time-wasting, all of which added to his competitiveness. Warne said that "part of the art of bowling spin is to make the batsman think that something special is happening even when it isn't".

Warne was an effective lower-order batter; he was once dismissed for 99 with a reckless shot on what was later shown to be a no-ball. Warne has scored the most Test runs without having scored a century; his top scores were 99 and 90. He also scored the third-most international Test ducks. Of players who have batted in more than 175 Test innings, Warne's proportion of dismissals by being bowled out is the lowest, at under seven per cent.

Warne was a successful slip fielder; he took 125 catches — the most in Test cricket history by a specialist bowler.

== Performance analysis ==
Warne was the third-highest five-wicket haul-taker in international cricket, after Muttiah Muralitharan and Richard Hadlee. He took 37 Test five wicket hauls and one in an ODI, along with 10 Test ten-wicket hauls.

=== Test matches ===
Versus	Matches	Overs	Maidens	Runs	Wickets	5w	10w	Best	Avg	S/R	E/R
Bangladesh	2	87.2	12	300	11	1	0	5 for 113	27.27	47.6	3.43
England	36	1792.5	488	4535	195	11	4	8 for 71	23.25	55.1	2.52
ICC World XI	1	31	7	71	6	0	0	3 for 23	11.83	31.0	2.29
India	14	654.1	139	2029	43	1	0	6 for 125	47.18	91.2	3.10
New Zealand	20	961.4	252	2511	103	3	0	6 for 31	24.37	56.0	2.61
Pakistan	15	675.1	192	1816	90	6	2	7 for 23	20.17	45.0	2.68
South Africa	24	1321.2	367	3142	130	7	2	7 for 56	24.16	60.9	2.37
Sri Lanka	13	527.5	132	1507	59	5	2	5 for 43	25.54	53.6	2.85
West Indies	19	679.4	159	1947	65	3	0	7 for 52	29.95	62.7	2.86
Zimbabwe	1	53.1	13	137	6	0	0	3 for 68	22.83	53.1	2.57
Overall (9)	145	6784.1	1761	17995	708	37	10	8 for 71	25.41	57.4	2.65
Source: ESPNcricinfo

==== Test 10-wicket hauls ====
#	Figures	Match	Opponent	Venue	City	Country	Year
1	12/128	22	South Africa	Sydney Cricket Ground	Sydney	Australia	1994
2	11/110	30	England	Brisbane Cricket Ground	Brisbane	Australia	1994
3	11/77	39	Pakistan	Brisbane Cricket Ground	Brisbane	Australia	1995
4	12/109	63	South Africa	Sydney Cricket Ground	Sydney	Australia	1998
5	11/229	92	England	Kennington Oval	London	England	2001
6	11/188	102	Pakistan	P Sara Oval	Colombo	Sri Lanka	2002
7	10/159	108	Sri Lanka	Galle International Stadium	Galle	Sri Lanka	2004
8	10/155	109	Sri Lanka	Asgiriya Stadium	Kandy	Sri Lanka	2004
9	10/162	125	England	Edgbaston Cricket Ground	Birmingham	England	2005
10	12/246	128	England	Kennington Oval	London	England	2005

=== Career-best performances ===
	Bowling			
	Score	Fixture	Venue	Season
Test	8/71	Australia v England	Gabba, Brisbane	1994
ODI	5/33	Australia v West Indies	the Sydney Cricket Ground, Sydney	1996
FC	8/71	Australia v England	Gabba, Brisbane	1994
LA	6/42	Surrey v Hampshire	Whitgift School, Croydon	2006
T20	4/21	Deccan Chargers v Rajasthan Royals	Vidarbha Cricket Association Stadium, Jamtha, Nagpur	2010

== Commentator ==
After his retirement, Warne became a television cricket commentator. On 13 July 2005, Nine Network announced it would not renew his commentating contract, for which he was paid around A$300,000 annually, due to incidents in his private life. He rejoined Nine in 2008 and continued as a member of its commentary team until Nine lost the broadcasting TV rights in 2018. Warne was also signed by Sky Sports in 2009 and Fox Cricket in 2018. He worked for both Sky and Fox until his death.

== Personal life ==
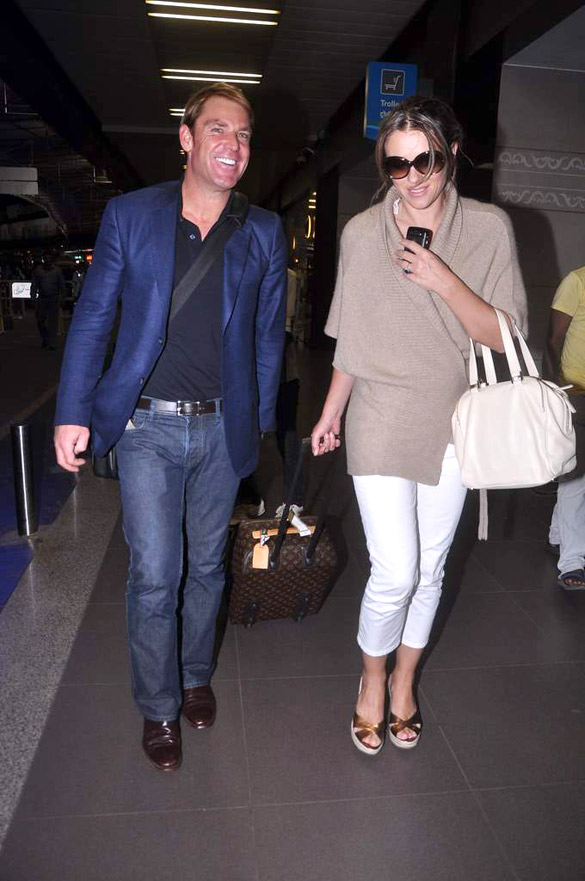
Warne in 2012 with then-fiancée Elizabeth Hurley

From 1999 to 2005, Warne was married to Simone Callahan, with whom he had children Summer, Jackson and Brooke. In 2000, Warne lost the Australian vice-captaincy after it was discovered he was sending sexual text messages to a British nurse while still married to Callahan. He was also involved in an altercation with some teenage boys who took a photograph of him smoking after he had accepted sponsorship from a nicotine patch company in return for quitting smoking. In April 2007, Warne and Callahan were reported to be reuniting two years after their divorce. Five months later, however, Callahan again left Warne after he inadvertently sent her a text message he had intended for another woman.

Following his split from Callahan, Warne dated English actress Elizabeth Hurley. Although their relationship at first seemed short-lived following the disclosure that Warne was sending sexual messages to a married Melbourne businesswoman, the couple created a media frenzy when Hurley moved into Warne's mansion in Brighton, Victoria. In late 2011, Hurley and Warne announced they were engaged, but they had cancelled the engagement by December 2013. Warne later said, "I was more in love with Elizabeth than I'd realised I could be. I miss the love we had. My years with Elizabeth were the happiest of my life."

After retiring from cricket, Warne worked for the Shane Warne Foundation, which assisted seriously ill and underprivileged children. The charity was launched in 2004 and distributed £400,000; its activities included a charity poker tournament. The charity closed in 2017 after running at a financial loss for four of the five previous years. In 2014, the foundation raised $465,000 but spent $550,000.

Warne joined Muttiah Muralitharan in humanitarian efforts to help Sri Lankans who were adversely affected by the 2004 Indian Ocean earthquake and tsunami. His charity the Shane Warne Foundation donated AU$20,000 to help rebuild Galle International Stadium. Warne was named in the World XI squad during the World Cricket Tsunami Appeal tournament, which was held in Melbourne on 10 January 2005 to raise funds for post-tsunami humanitarian relief efforts.

In January 2008, Warne signed a two-year agreement with 888poker to represent them at international poker events, including the Aussie Millions, World Series of Poker and the 888 UK Poker Open. This sponsorship agreement ended in January 2015.

In 2010, Nine Network commissioned a chat show titled Warnie, which was hosted by Warne. The program debuted on 24 November 2010 with Warne interviewing James Packer. Celebrities interviewed on the program included the captain of the Australian cricket team Ricky Ponting, and singers Chris Martin and Susan Boyle. Warne also did promotional work for hair-loss-recovery company Advanced Hair; the British Advertising Standards Authority (ASA) investigated this matter in relation to an illegal celebrity endorsement of medical services.

Away from cricket, Warne was also known as a keen amateur golfer. In 2018, Warne hit a hole in one on the 16th hole at Augusta National Golf Club. Warne placed second in the 2021 Alfred Dunhill Links Championship pro-am section.

In August 2021, Warne contracted COVID-19 and was placed on a ventilator "to make sure there were no longer-lasting effects". He said, "I had a thumping headache and I had one day where I had the shivers, but sweating, like when you have the flu", and that Australians would have to learn to live with the virus. Warne was born with complete heterochromia, giving him a blue right eye and a green left eye.

== Death ==
On 4 March 2022, at the age of 52, Warne died of a heart attack caused by atherosclerosis while holidaying on the island Ko Samui, Thailand. The autopsy at the time suggested the death was due to natural causes.

Warne died on the same day as fellow Australian cricketer Rod Marsh, to whom Warne paid tribute on Twitter a few hours before his own death. Six days after Warne's death, his body was returned from Thailand to Melbourne on a private aeroplane.

Warne's private funeral took place on 20 March 2022 in Melbourne at Moorabbin Oval, the headquarters and former home ground of St Kilda Football Club. The mourners were led by Warne's parents and three children, and some former teammates were in attendance. On 30 March, Warne was publicly honoured at a state memorial event at the Melbourne Cricket Ground.

=== Tributes ===
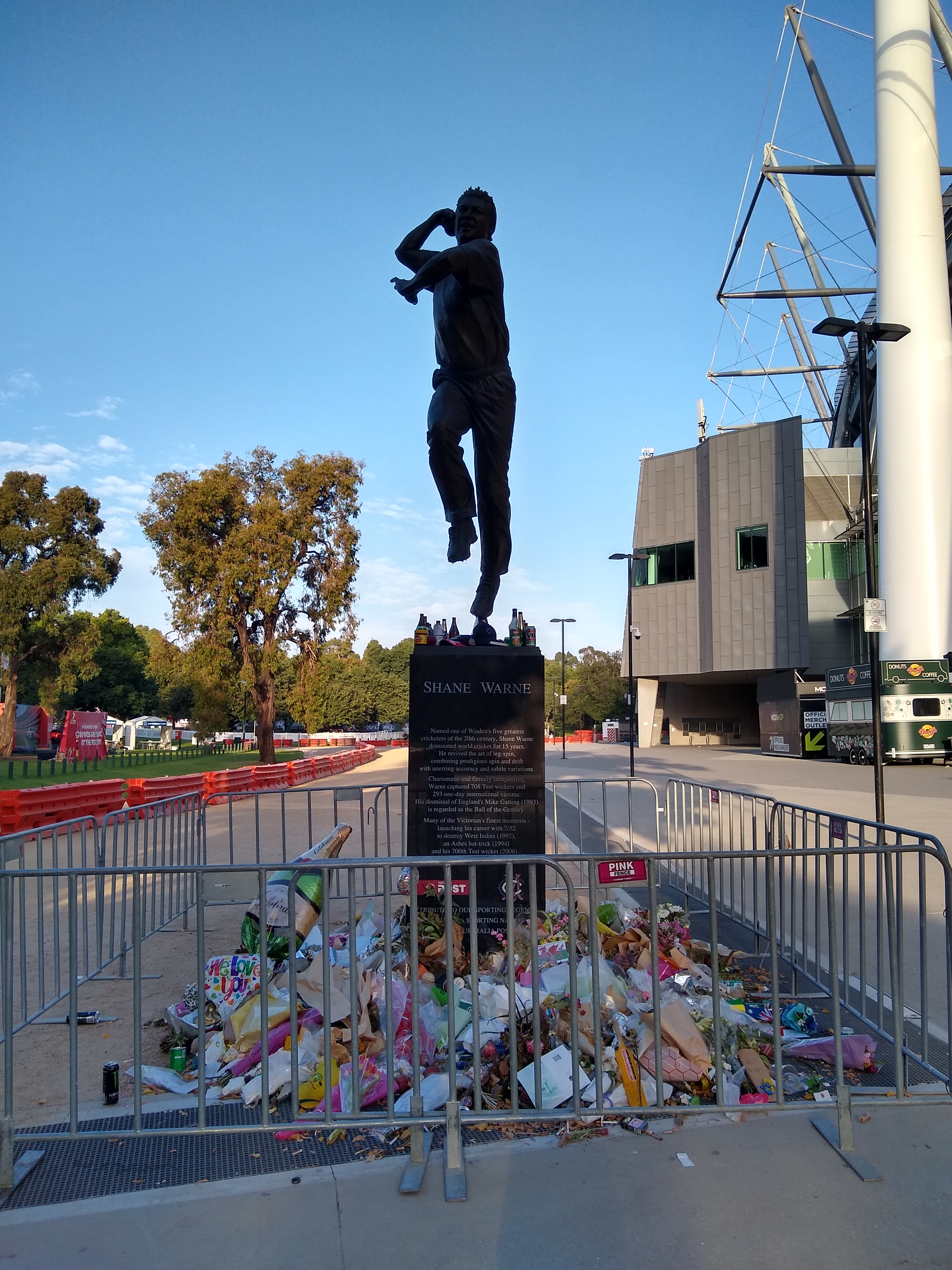
Warne's statue outside the MCG became a makeshift memorial to him after his death

Australian teammates Glenn McGrath, Adam Gilchrist, Jason Gillespie, Matthew Hayden, Andrew Symonds, Brett Lee, Darren Lehmann, Tom Moody, Ricky Ponting and Shane Watson, as well as Australian Test captain Pat Cummins and Australian limited-overs captain Aaron Finch, remembered Warne.

Outside Australia, many former and current cricketers also paid tribute, including England's Kevin Pietersen and Michael Vaughan; India's Sachin Tendulkar and Virat Kohli; New Zealand's Brendon McCullum and Kane Williamson; Pakistan's Wasim Akram and Waqar Younis; South Africa's Graeme Smith; and West Indies' Brian Lara. Indian commentator Harsha Bhogle also offered a tribute.

To commemorate Warne, the Australian women's cricket team wore black armbands in their first 2022 Women's Cricket World Cup game against England. A similar tribute was held by the Australian men's cricket team on the second day of the first Test against Pakistan, with both teams observing a minute of silence before the day's play.

Celebrities, including Warne's close friend Chris Martin of Coldplay, Russell Crowe, Mick Jagger, Elton John, Ed Sheeran, Hugh Jackman and Magda Szubanski, also paid their respects. Warne's former fiancée Elizabeth Hurley said: "I feel like the sun has gone behind a cloud forever. RIP my beloved lionheart." Fans ornamented the statue of Warne at the Melbourne Cricket Ground with flowers, beer, baked beans, meat pies and cigarettes.

Warne's former Big Bash League team, the Melbourne Stars paid tribute to Warne during their game against the Hobart Hurricanes. During the match, all the Stars players wore Warne's number 23, and a standing ovation took place after the 23rd ball of the game. The Stars retired the number 23 following the game.

In June 2022, on the Queen's Birthday Honours list, Warne was posthumously appointed as an Officer of the Order of Australia (AO) for his service to cricket and philanthropic contributions. In December 2022, Warne was elevated to a Legend in the Sport Australia Hall of Fame.

In November 2024, a partnership between Hasbro, Monopoly and the Shane Warne Legacy was announced with the unveiling of the largest-ever Monopoly board, measuring at over 1200 square metres, as confirmed by Monopoly.

=== State memorial service ===
Warne's state memorial service was held on the evening of 30 March 2022 at the Melbourne Cricket Ground. The service, which was free to attend and ran for around 140 minutes, was attended by about 55,000 people, broadcast on multiple channels and streamed online. The service was ultimately watched by more than 1.5 million Australians.

The memorial was opened by Greta Bradman, Donald Bradman's only granddaughter, who performed the national anthem "Advance Australia Fair"; the service included eulogies from Warne's children, his father, his brother Jason, and other family members and friends. During his eulogy, Warne's father said, "Shane said of himself, 'I smoked, I drank, and I played a little cricket'".

It was earlier decided the Great Southern Stand at MCG was to be renamed in Warne's honour. To conclude the memorial, Warne's children unveiled the Shane Warne Stand sign with a recording of Frank Sinatra singing "My Way" playing in the background as the crowd rose and cheered.

== Awards ==
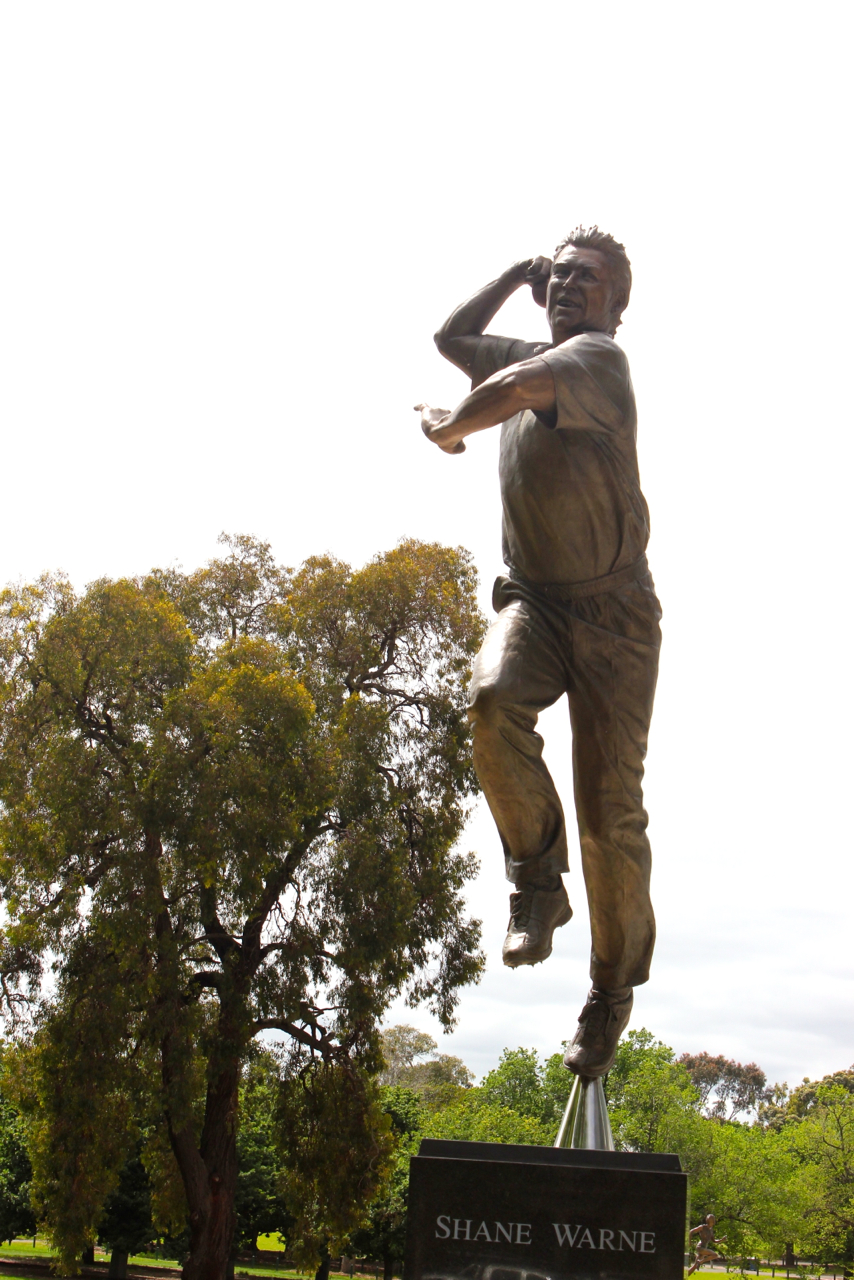
Statue of Warne at the Melbourne Cricket Ground

In 2000, a panel of cricket experts chose Warne as one of five Wisden Cricketers of the Century, the only specialist bowler selected and the only one who was still playing at the time. The same publication named Warne in an all-time Test World XI and he was the Wisden Leading Cricketer in the World in 1997 and 2004.

In 2004, Warne was included as part of Richie Benaud's Greatest XI, a team chosen by Richie Benaud that compares players across all teams and eras using statistics and personal testimonials. Warne was chosen as the best spin bowler of all time by both Benaud and the Australian public, with 85% of respondents in agreement. In 2005, Warne was named the BBC Overseas Sports Personality of the Year.

In 2007, Cricket Australia and Sri Lanka Cricket decided to name the Australia–Sri Lanka Test cricket series the Warne–Muralidaran Trophy in honour of Warne and Muttiah Muralidaran. Also in 2007, Cricket Australia named Warne in their greatest ODI XI of all time. In 2009, Warne was awarded honorary life membership of Marylebone Cricket Club.

On 22 December 2011, a statue honouring Warne was unveiled outside the Melbourne Cricket Ground. The bronze statue was sculpted by Louis Laumen and depicts Warne during his bowling action and has an inscription highlighting his cricketing career. Warne, who was present at the sculpture's unveiling, stated: "It's a great honour, it's a bit weird seeing yourself up there but I'm very proud."

In 2012, a grandstand at the Rose Bowl, where Warne played county cricket for Hampshire, was named the Shane Warne Stand. In 2012, he was also inducted into the Cricket Hall of Fame by Cricket Australia. In 2013, Warne was inducted into the ICC Cricket Hall of Fame. In a fan poll conducted by the Cricketers' Almanack in 2017, Warne was named in Australia's best Ashes XI of the previous 40 years.

== In popular culture ==
Warne made a cameo appearance on the Australian sitcom Kath & Kim in 2007. He also appeared on BBC Television panel game A Question of Sport, taking on the captaincy for three shows and appearing regularly.

In September 2022, it was reported that Australia's Nine Network had begun work on Warnie, a two-part biopic about Warne's life, within weeks of his death, describing the television miniseries as a fitting tribute. Friends and family of Warne described the project as insensitive and urged the broadcaster to scrap the series, feeling it was too soon after his death to make it. The series never had approval from the Shane Warne Legacy, the entity that owns all of Shane Warne's Intellectual Property. Written by Matt Ford, the first part of the miniseries premiered on 25 June 2023, with the second episode airing the following night with Alex Williams portraying Warne. The biopic aired to mostly negative reviews from the public and critics.

The 2009 track "Jiggery Pokery" by The Duckworth Lewis Method retells the story of Warne bowling the "Ball of the Century".
