= Craig McMillan =

New Zealand cricketer

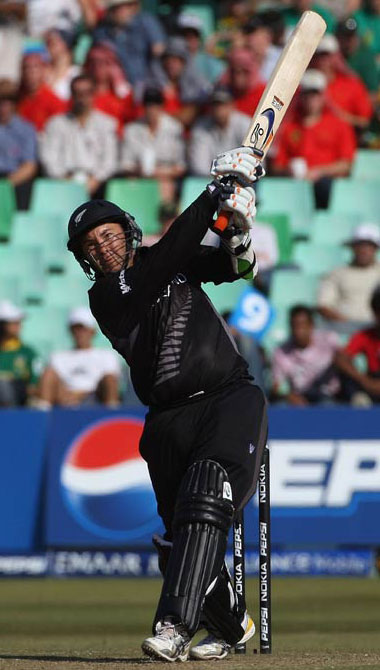

Personal information
- Full name: Craig Douglas McMillan
- Born: 13 September 1976 (age 50); Christchurch, Canterbury, New Zealand
- Batting: Right-handed
- Bowling: Right arm medium
- Role: Batsman
- Relatives: James McMillan (cousin)

International information
- National side: New Zealand (1997–2007)
- Test debut (cap 204): 7 November 1997 v Australia
- Last Test: 18 March 2005 v Australia
- ODI debut (cap 102): 20 May 1997 v Sri Lanka
- Last ODI: 24 April 2007 v Sri Lanka
- ODI shirt no.: 10
- T20I debut (cap 6): 17 February 2005 v Australia
- Last T20I: 22 September 2007 v Pakistan

Domestic team information
- Years: Team
- 1994/95–2009/10: Canterbury
- 2003: Gloucestershire
- 2005: Hampshire

Career statistics
Competition	Test	ODI	FC	LA
Matches	55	197	138	326
Runs scored	3,116	4,707	7,817	8,457
Batting average	38.46	28.18	39.28	30.86
100s/50s	6/19	3/28	16/42	12/43
Top score	142	117	168*	125
Balls bowled	2,502	1,879	6,572	3,651
Wickets	28	49	88	106
Bowling average	44.89	35.04	35.98	29.79
5 wickets in innings	0	0	1	1
10 wickets in match	0	0	0	0
Best bowling	3/48	3/20	6/71	5/38
Catches/stumpings	22/–	44/–	58/–	89/–
Medal record
Men's cricket
Representing New Zealand
ICC Champions Trophy
Winner	2000 Kenya
Commonwealth Games
Third place	1998 Kuala Lumpur
- Source: ESPNcricinfo, 20 April 2017

Craig Douglas McMillan (born 13 September 1976) is a New Zealand cricket coach and former international cricketer who played all forms of the game. He was a right-handed batsman and useful right-arm medium pace bowler who played for Canterbury in New Zealand first-class cricket. He also played English county cricket for Hampshire and Gloucestershire County Cricket Clubs. McMillan was a member of the New Zealand team that won the 2000 ICC KnockOut Trophy.

He was the New Zealand batting coach and has worked in the media as a commentator for Sky Network Television and Star Cricket.

== Playing style ==
His batting was often characterised by innovation and improvisation, notably with a "square on" stance, which he sometimes uses in One-day Internationals when he is premeditating a big hit to the legside. His medium pace bowling is characterised by an extremely high proportion of bouncers – highly belligerent for a part-time medium pace bowler.

== International career ==
McMillan made his Test debut in 1997 against world champions Australia aged 22. At the Basin Reserve in 1998–99 he was part of a 137-run 6th wicket second innings partnership with Chris Cairns which won them the 2nd Test against India. Earlier in the year he had scored his highest Test score, 142 against Sri Lanka at R. Premadasa Stadium.

In the summer of 2000–01 in Hamilton, McMillan took 26 runs off a Younis Khan over which was a record at the time. To date he has made 3 ODI centuries, the first two against Pakistan, including an innings of 104 off 75 balls. It was the equal fastest ever century by a New Zealander. The record was broken by Jacob Oram in January 2007 but he reclaimed it with a 67 ball century against the Australians in Hamilton on 20 February 2007.

=== The comeback ===
After being dropped for most of 2006, he was recalled to the NZ team for the CB series in Australia in 2007. In February 2007 he had belted a 27 ball 50 as New Zealand successfully chased down Australia's total of 336 to win the Chappell–Hadlee Trophy. He continued his form, scoring the fastest century by a New Zealander (67 balls) and led his team from 41–4 to 350–9 and a one wicket victory against Australia in the third ODI of the Chappell–Hadlee Series. These performances (including handy part-time bowling wickets) capped off an excellent season and comeback to international cricket for "macca" as he was named in the 2007 world cup squad.

McMillan had previously shared the record for the fastest one day international fifty by a New Zealander, with a 21 ball effort against the USA. His cameo included two separate overs of 27 runs with his partner Nathan Astle. However that has since been bettered by Brendon McCullum's 50 off just 20 balls at the 2007 Cricket World Cup against Canada.

=== Form slumps ===
A regular since his debut, his place in the team was under threat after a poor 2002. He finished the year with just 282 runs at 23.50 from his 8 Tests. He lost his place but was recalled to tour India in 2003–04 where he saved the 1st Test with innings of 54 and 83 not out. In the 2nd Test he scored an unbeaten century and in turn cemented his spot back in the team. He had a tour of England in 2004 where he broke his finger in a tour match against Leicestershire after a poor 1st Test.

Calls re-emerged during the 2005 Chappell–Hadlee Series and the preceding tour to South Africa for McMillan to be dropped from the team. McMillan incurred criticism, along with fellow Black Caps Nathan Astle, Hamish Marshall and James Marshall, from the media for a slump in form.

He was subsequently dropped from the national squad to play Sri Lanka in a one-day series in December 2005 and January 2006. He returned to the domestic setup and piled on the runs for Canterbury thus keeping his name in the selectors minds. It paid off when his brother in law Nathan Astle got injured as he received an immediate recall to the team. His comeback game was unsuccessful as he was runout of 2 but in the second game he impressed with 29 not out out of a miserable team total of 73.

=== Late career ===
McMillan sparkled in the 2007 ICC World Twenty20 in South Africa. During what would be his final international tournament, he was New Zealand's leading run-scorer with 163 runs at an average of 40.75 and a strike-rate of 181.

McMillan did enough to earn selection for the Commonwealth Bank ODI series in Australia. On 21 January 2007 he made 89 against Australia. A month later, he scored a blistering hundred off just 67 balls, which is the fastest by any Kiwi player. His Gladiator-like efforts set the stage for a whopping 3–0 series win against Australia, and also the 2nd highest successful run chase in ODI history. Chasing a massive 346, at one stage New Zealand were 41 for 4 and with Fleming, Vincent, Taylor and Styris gone, looked well and truly out of the game. Craig McMillan's amazing innings kept their hopes alive and resulted in probably the greatest comeback by a team in ODI history. New Zealand managed to win with 1 wicket and 3 balls left.

=== Retirement ===
He announced his retirement on 17 October 2007 after a Twenty20 tournament wherein he was New Zealand's leading run-scorer with 163 runs at an average of 40.75 and a strike-rate of 181. Citing personal reasons and health problems as contributing factors, McMillan said he wanted to go out on a high.

== Criticisms ==
He is often criticised for his weight and lack of fitness, and he has often been involved in verbal confrontations with opposition fielders, only to lose his concentration and lose his wicket soon after. He was famously dismissed the ball after he was recorded by the stump microphone at Australian wicketkeeper Adam Gilchrist after being baited for having edged a ball and refused to walk, when the umpire was oblivious to the nick.

== After cricket ==
He had joined the Indian Cricket League (ICL), and was the captain of the Kolkata Tigers until the eventual disbanding of the league.

In 2020, McMillan joined the Spark Cricket commentary team.

Sporting positions
Preceded by Robin Peterson	Nelson Cricket Club professional 2007–2008	Succeeded by Robin Peterson
