= Tony Dodemaide =

Australian cricketer

Tony Dodemaide OAM
Personal information
- Full name: Anthony Ian Christopher Dodemaide
- Born: 5 October 1963 (age 63); Williamstown, Victoria, Australia
- Nickname: Dodders
- Batting: Right-handed
- Bowling: Right arm fast-medium

International information
- National side: Australia
- Test debut (cap 343): 26 December 1987 v New Zealand
- Last Test: 13 September 1992 v Sri Lanka
- ODI debut (cap 101): 2 January 1988 v Sri Lanka
- Last ODI: 28 March 1993 v New Zealand

Domestic team information
- Years: Team
- 1983/84–1997/98: Victoria
- 1989–1991: Sussex

Career statistics
Competition	Test	ODI	FC	LA
Matches	10	24	184	131
Runs scored	202	124	5,966	1,537
Batting average	22.44	13.77	28.68	22.94
100s/50s	0/1	0/0	5/27	0/0
Top score	50	30	123	40*
Balls bowled	2,184	1,327	36,841	6,774
Wickets	34	36	534	161
Bowling average	28.02	20.91	32.01	26.33
5 wickets in innings	1	1	17	2
10 wickets in match	0	0	0	0
Best bowling	6/58	5/21	6/58	6/9
Catches/stumpings	6/–	7/–	89/–	27/–
- Source: Cricinfo, 2 October 2009

Anthony Ian Christopher Dodemaide OAM (born 5 October 1963) is an Australian cricket administrator and former cricketer. After a three-year stint as Chief Executive of the Western Australian Cricket Association in Perth, he became the current chief executive of Cricket Victoria. He is currently a selector for the Australian men's national team.

He took 534 first-class wickets for Victoria and Sussex. He also took a five-wicket haul on both his Test and One Day International (ODI) debuts.

== International career ==
Dodemaide began his career as a fast-bowling all-rounder and competed in 10 Tests and 24 One Day Internationals for Australia. Despite healthy batting and bowling averages for an all-rounder at test level (23 and 28 respectively), Dodemaide only made ten Test appearances. On his debut, he took six wickets in the second innings against New Zealand in Melbourne in 1987.

On his debut ODI against Sri Lanka, he took 5 wickets.

== After retirement ==
He joined the WACA in May 2004 after five years as the Head of Cricket for the Marylebone Cricket Club. Prior to the MCC position, he was Manager of Corporate Marketing at the Melbourne Cricket Club. In October 2021, he joined the Cricket Australia panel of selectors.

In the 2022 Australia Day Honours, he was awarded the Medal of the Order of Australia for "service to sports administration, and to cricket".
