= Chris Cairns =

New Zealand cricketer

Chris Cairns ONZM
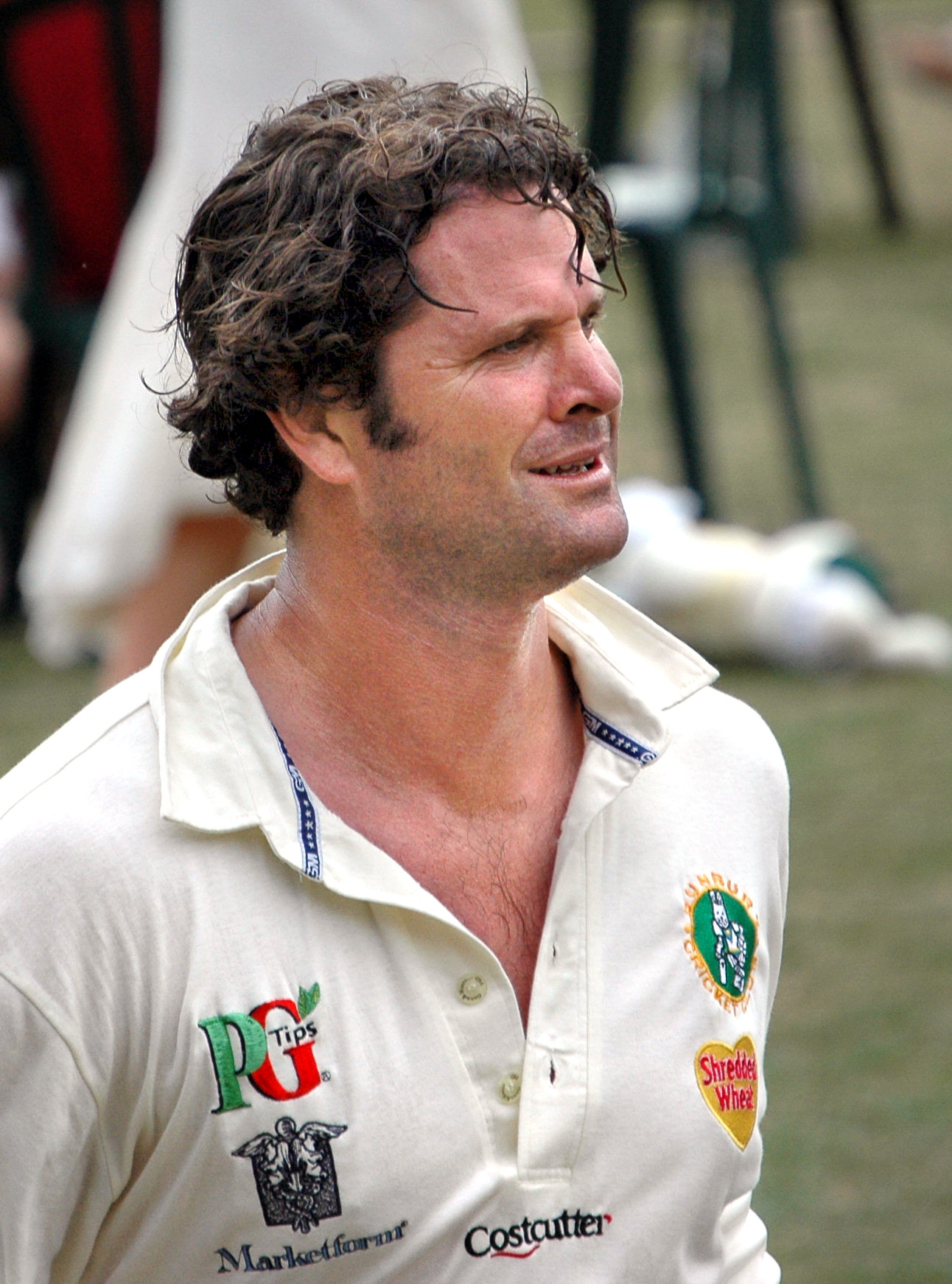

Personal information
- Full name: Christopher Lance Cairns
- Born: 13 June 1970 (age 56); Picton, New Zealand
- Batting: Right-handed
- Bowling: Right arm fast
- Role: All-rounder
- Relatives: Lance Cairns (father)

International information
- National side: New Zealand (1989–2006)
- Test debut (cap 168): 24 November 1989 v Australia
- Last Test: 13 June 2004 v England
- ODI debut (cap 76): 13 February 1991 v England
- Last ODI: 8 January 2006 v Sri Lanka
- ODI shirt no.: 6
- T20I debut: 17 February 2005 v Australia
- Last T20I: 16 February 2006 v West Indies

Domestic team information
- Years: Team
- 1988–2008: Nottinghamshire
- 1988/89: Northern Districts
- 1990/91–2005/06: Canterbury

Career statistics
Competition	Test	ODI	FC	LA
Matches	62	215	217	424
Runs scored	3,320	4,950	10,702	10,367
Batting average	33.53	29.46	35.32	32.60
100s/50s	5/22	4/26	13/71	9/55
Top score	158	115	158	143
Balls bowled	11,698	8,168	16,620	16,620
Wickets	218	201	647	455
Bowling average	29.40	32.80	28.31	27.99
5 wickets in innings	13	1	30	6
10 wickets in match	1	0	6	0
Best bowling	7/27	5/42	8/47	6/12
Catches/stumpings	14/–	66/–	78/–	118/–
Medal record
Men's cricket
Representing New Zealand
ICC KnockOut Trophy
Winner	2000 Kenya
- Source: ESPNcricinfo, 26 November 2008

Christopher Lance Cairns ONZM (born 13 June 1970) is a former New Zealand cricketer who played as a right-arm fast bowler and right-handed batter. He is regarded as one of the greatest all-rounders of all time.

Cairns represented the New Zealand national team from 1989 to 2006, where he had a career with 218 wickets and 3,320 runs in Tests, and 201 wickets and 4,950 runs in One Day Internationals (ODIs). He was a member of the national team that won the 2000 KnockOut Trophy. He captained the ODI team in 2002 and 2003. In New Zealand domestic cricket, Cairns represented Northern Districts in 1988/1989 and Canterbury from 1990/1991 to 2005/26, as well as Nottinghamshire in English county cricket from 1988 to 2008.

Cairns has been a subject of match fixing allegations in the 2008 Indian Cricket League made against him.

== Domestic career ==
Cairns also played for Northland in the Hawke Cup. He had joined the Indian Cricket League, and was the captain of the Chandigarh Lions till its closure in 2008. He later went on to play for Nottinghamshire in the English Twenty20 cup competition.

== International career ==
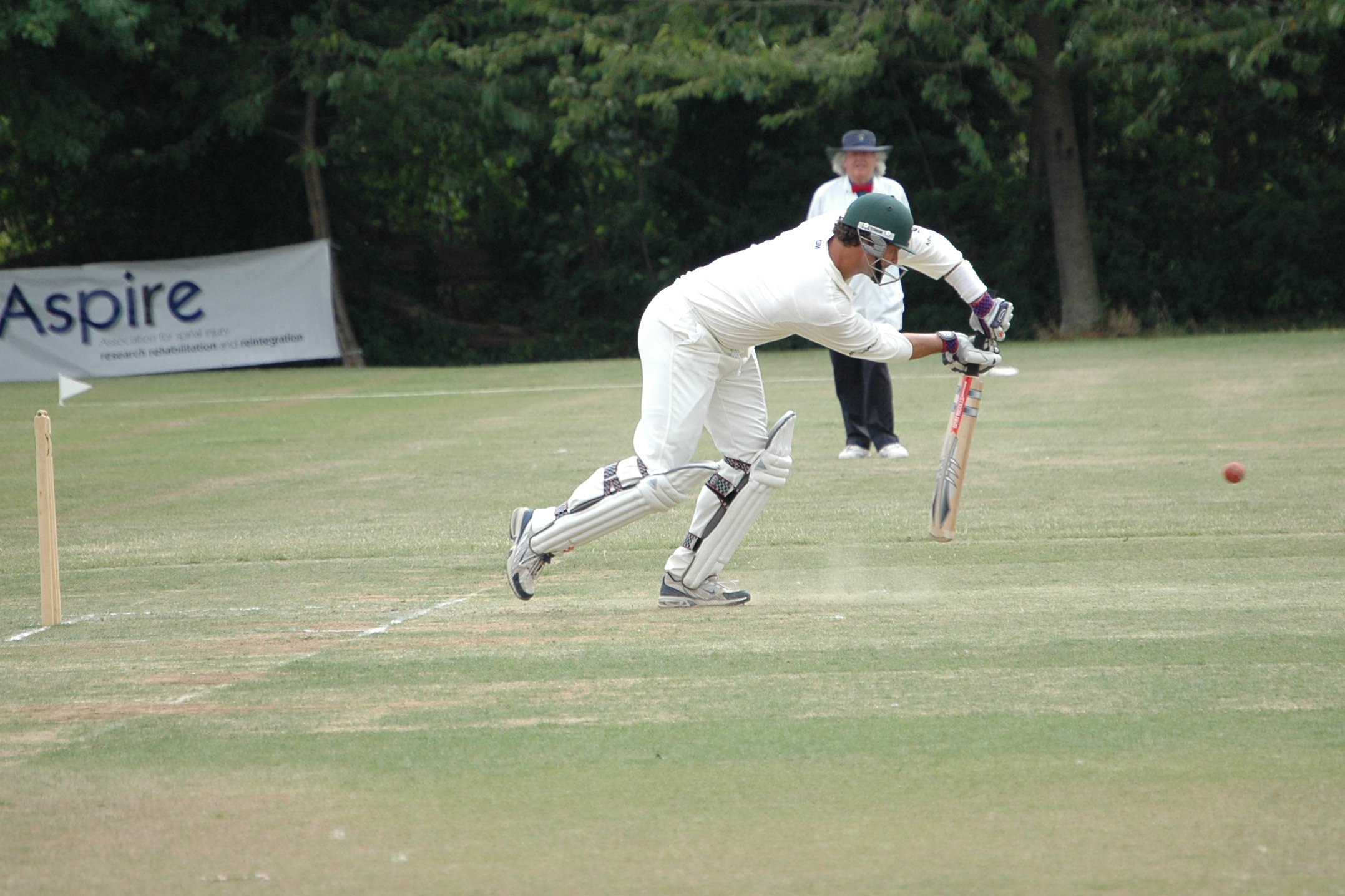
Cairns batting

He was included in the New Zealand national under-19 cricket team for the 1988 Youth Cricket World Cup, which was also eventually the inaugural edition of the Under-19 Cricket World Cup. He was later selected to the senior national team. He made his test debut against Australia on 24 November 1989.

Cairns was a destructive batsman who could hit sixes straight down the ground. He was also an intelligent fast-medium bowler. Since then, persistent injuries have forced him to drop his pace and rely more on his hard-to-read slower ball.

With the bat, Cairns has been the author of some of New Zealand cricket's most memorable innings, including his unbeaten 102 to win the final of the 2000 ICC KnockOut Trophy for New Zealand against India in Kenya, and his 158 from just 172 balls in a Test against South Africa in 2004. Cairns knocked Shane Warne out of Australia's bowling attack during a 2000 test in Wellington when he launched several sixes out of the Basin Reserve and onto the adjacent street. Cairns formerly held the world record for most sixes in Tests (87, since surpassed by Adam Gilchrist), and for a time held the New Zealand record for fastest century in ODIs (75 balls, currently owned by Corey Anderson with 36 balls).

=== ICC KnockOut Trophy ===
Cairns was also the part of the victorious New Zealand campaign during the 2000 ICC KnockOut Trophy where they beat India in the final to lift their first title in major ICC global event. He played his part in the final and helped the Kiwis side, by scoring a match winning knock of 102* and was awarded the player of the final. Finally New Zealand went onto win the final and registered the highest ever chase in an ICC Champions Trophy final (265). He also went onto become the first player to score a century in an ICC Champions Trophy final (was previously called as ICC Knockout Trophy) in a winning cause. He became only the third player to score a century in a Champions Trophy final after Philo Wallace and Sourav Ganguly.

=== Making history ===
In an ODI against India in 1999, he went onto become the second ever player in ODI history after Gordon Greenidge to score a century in his 100th ODI and became the first batsman to score a century in his 100th ODI in a winning cause. He is currently the only New Zealand player to achieve that milestone.

Cairns' career-best bowling performance in Tests was 7/27 against the West Indies in 1999, and he is New Zealand's sixth highest wicket taker in Tests, after Richard Hadlee, Daniel Vettori, Tim Southee, Trent Boult, and Chris Martin.

He is also one of only eight players to have reached the all-rounder's double of 200 wickets and 3000 runs. Out of these seven players, Cairns reached the double 3rd fastest (58 Tests) behind Ian Botham and Kapil Dev (50 Tests). In ODIs, Cairns came close to another double of 200 wickets and 5000 runs. Cairns finished his ODI career on 4950 runs, just 50 short. Cairns Test batting average at number seven (44.02) is the 5th best for that position.

The New Zealand Herald journalist, Richard Boock said about Cairns: "It's not a scientific measure of course, but if Cairns' body had held together long enough for him to have played 100 Tests, his figures extrapolate out to something like 5334 runs and 351 wickets – very similar to those of Botham." He went on to say "He was, and should be remembered as, one of the game's best all-rounders."

=== Late career ===
During the Lord's Test against England, he bowled England wicket-keeper Chris Read for zero. Read was ducking a ball that he thought was a beamer, but was actually a well-disguised slower ball.

Cairns also played in the World Cricket Tsunami Appeal ODI, at the MCG. Cairns played for the ICC World XI and scored 69 off 47 balls before being stumped by Kumar Sangakkara off the bowling of Muttiah Muralitharan. During his innings, Cairns put a 91 run partnership on with his captain, Ricky Ponting. With the ball, Cairns picked up 1–37 off 6 overs.

Injuries plagued Cairns throughout his career. There remains some debate over his statistics and how they reflected his ability. In Cairns career he played 62 Test and missed a further 55 due to injury. Sidharth Monga writing in 2009 said that Cairns' career returns "were a poor justification of his prodigious talent."

=== Retirement ===
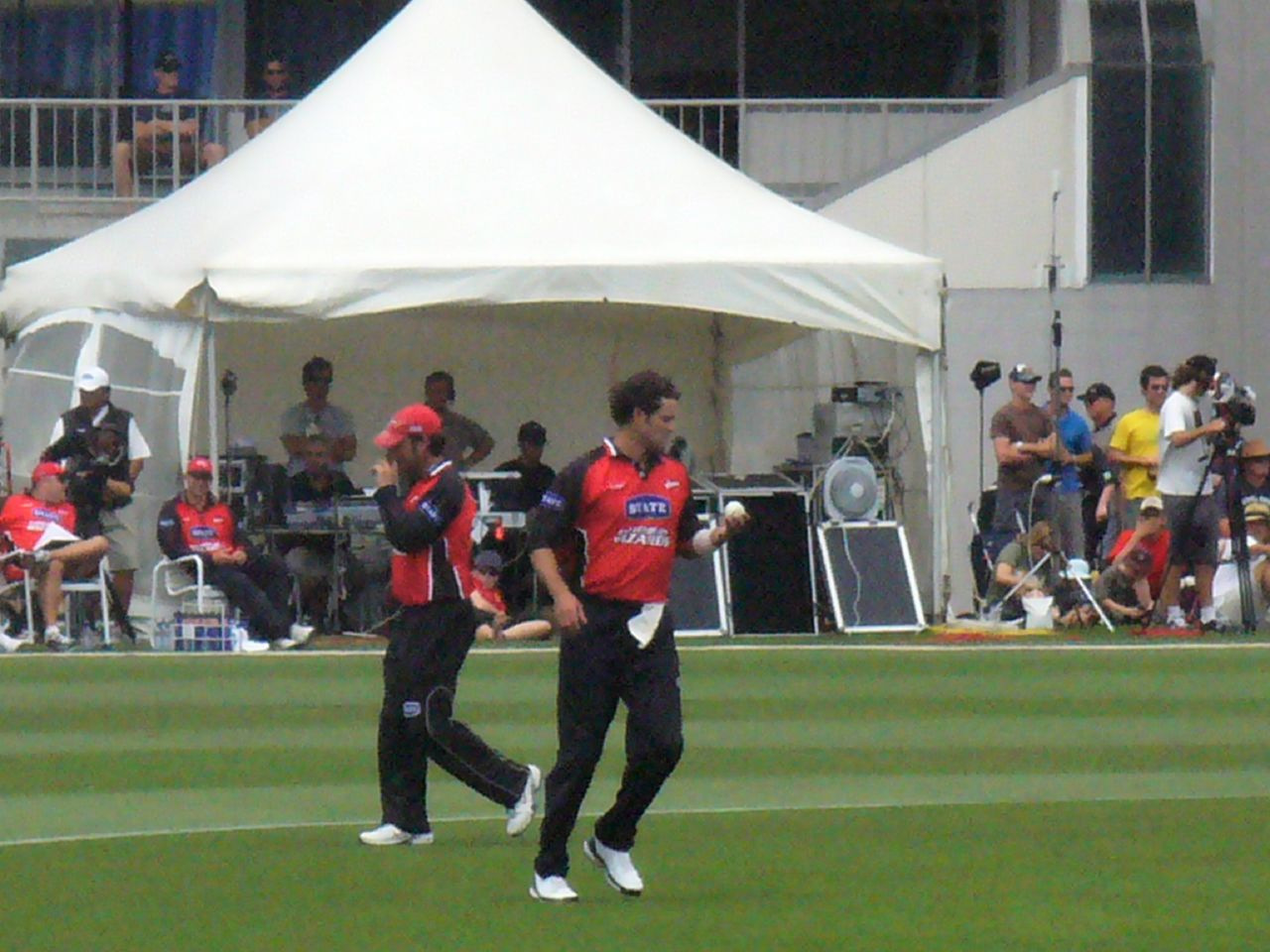
Cairns bowling for the Canterbury Wizards in 2006

Cairns retired from the New Zealand Test team in 2004.

In the 2005 Queen's Birthday Honours, Cairns was appointed an Officer of the New Zealand Order of Merit, for services to cricket.

On 22 January 2006, Cairns announced his retirement from ODIs in a press conference. A Twenty20 match against the West Indies on 16 February 2006 was his last game representing New Zealand. He was also part of the ICC World XI that played in the World Cricket Tsunami Appeal matches.

The New Zealand Herald compared his retirement to those of Michael Jordan and Björn Borg on 15 February 2006. Cairns also left the door open for a comeback, but said "I don't think I could ever be tempted back".

In Cairns' final game, he bowled four overs for 24 and no wicket and scored a nine-ball duck, before being bowled by Chris Gayle. He also missed the stumps in both attempts during the bowl off. ESPNcricinfo describe his final international as "an unfitting farewell" and that "he deserved better". He was named as the captain of the World XI for the 2009 ICL World Series Twenty 20 tournament which was set to be held in Hyderabad. However, the proposed tournament was cancelled due to payment disputes.

== Alleged match fixing ==
In December 2013, Cairns was the subject of allegations in an ICC investigation into match-fixing. He is alleged to have attempted to manipulate games in India when he was captain of the Chandigarh Lions in the short lived Indian Cricket League. Cairns has rejected these claims.

Former New Zealand cricketer Lou Vincent, an admitted match fixer, has said that Cairns had approached him about fixing matches. New Zealand cricketer Brendon McCullum also told the Anti Corruption and Security Unit (ACSU) of the International Cricket Council that Cairns made a match fixing approach to him. Cairns insists that he has never fixed a match, saying Vincent wanted to "mitigate his sins by blaming others" and taking issue with McCullum having waited three years before approaching the ICC.

In March 2012, Cairns successfully sued former Indian Premier League commissioner Lalit Modi for libel, after Modi posted on Twitter in 2010 that Cairns had been involved in match-fixing during 2008. He won costs and damages. On 12 September 2014, the Metropolitan Police announced that they would charge Cairns with perjury stemming from the Modi libel trial. He was acquitted of charges of perjury and perverting the course of justice on 30 November 2015.

== Personal life ==
He is son of former New Zealand cricketer Lance Cairns.

In August 1993, Cairns' sister Louise was killed in a train accident at Rolleston. In 2006, in collaboration with Toll Rail, he formed the Chris Cairns Foundation, which raises money to improve rail safety; in September 2008 he completed a 1,001 km (622 mi) walk promoting rail safety awareness.

Cairns married Melanie Croser in 2010; it is his third marriage. Croser, an Australian, had played basketball in the USA before working for a sports marketing group in Sydney. Cairns lives in Canberra and played for the local club North Canberra Gungahlin Eagles in the 2011/12 season.

On 10 August 2021, he was reported to be on life support after suffering a major heart attack resulting in aortic dissection in his home in Canberra, Australia about a week prior. He was later transferred to St Vincent's Hospital, Sydney and was kept in an intensive care unit. On 20 August 2021, Cairns was reported to be off life support and was able to communicate with his family. However, Cairns became paralysed from the waist down due to suffering a stroke during the surgery. On 19 September 2021, he recorded a message of gratitude on Twitter that he is recovering at home after being transferred to Spinal Unit on 10 September. It was his first post on his Twitter in 7 years.

On 5 February 2022, he revealed on his Instagram that he was diagnosed with bowel cancer after a routine check-up the day before.
