= List of New Zealand Test cricket records =

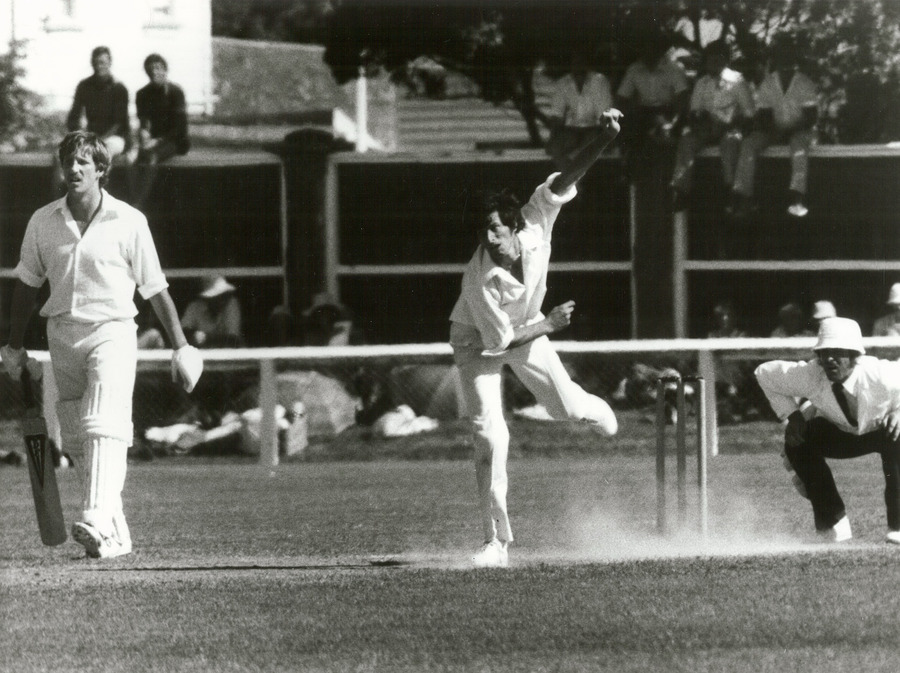
Richard Hadlee holds the record for the most Test wickets (431) and the most five-wicket hauls (36) for New Zealand.

Test cricket is the oldest form of cricket played at international level. A Test match is scheduled to take place over a period of five days, (Note: For the first 50 years of Test cricket matches were played over three or four days and until the 1930s some timeless Tests were played.) (Note: In October 2017, the ICC Board approved a trial of four-day Test cricket to run through until the 2019 Cricket World Cup.) and is played by teams representing full member nations of the International Cricket Council (ICC).

The following is a list of records by the New Zealand Test cricket team. It is based on the List of Test cricket records, but concentrates solely on records dealing with the New Zealand Test cricket team, and any cricketers who have played for that team.

New Zealand took part in their first recognised Test cricket match against England in the 1929/30 season, and the records listed here date from that time.

New Zealand won the inaugural ICC World Test Championship, beating India in the final by 8 wickets. They are ranked number two in Tests, number one in ODIs and number four in T20Is.

== Key ==
The top five records are listed for each category, except for the team wins, losses, draws and ties and the partnership records. Tied records for fifth place are also included. Explanations of the general symbols and cricketing terms used in the list are given below. Specific details are provided in each category where appropriate. All records include matches played for New Zealand only, and are correct as of November 2021.

Key
Symbol	Meaning
†	Player or umpire is currently active in Test cricket
*	Player remained not out or partnership remained unbroken
♠	Test cricket record
d	Innings was declared (e.g. 8/758d)
Date	Starting date of the Test match
Innings	Number of innings played
Matches	Number of matches played
Opposition	The team New Zealand was playing against
Period	The time period when the player was active in Test cricket
Player	The player involved in the record
Venue	Test cricket ground where the match was played

== Team records ==
=== Overall record ===
Mat	Won	Lost	Drawn	Tied	Win %
480	121	189	170	0	25.20
Last Updated: 9 August 2025

=== Team wins, losses, draws and ties ===
As of August 2025, New Zealand have played 480 Test matches resulting in 121 victories, 189 defeats and 170 draws, a draw counts as 0.5 wins

Opponent	First Match	Matches	Won	Lost	Draw	Tied	% Won
Australia	1946	62	8	36	18	0	27.42
Bangladesh	2001	19	14	2	3	0	81.58
England	1930	118	15	56	47	0	32.63
India	1955	65	16	22	27	0	45.38
Pakistan	1955	62	14	25	23	0	41.13
South Africa	1932	49	7	26	16	0	30.61
Sri Lanka	1983	40	18	11	11	0	59.21
West Indies	1952	52	19	13	20	0	55.77
Zimbabwe	1992	19	13	0	6	0	82.35
Total		480	121	189	170	0	42.84
Statistics are correct as of New Zealand v West Indies at Bay Oval, Mount Maunganui, 22 December 2025.

=== First Test series wins ===
Opponent	Year of first Home win	Year of first Away win
Afghanistan	YTP	YTP
Australia	1986	1986
Bangladesh	2001	2004
England	1984	1986
India	1981	2024
Ireland	YTP	2026
Pakistan	1985	1970
South Africa	2024	-
Sri Lanka	1983	1984
West Indies	1980	2002
Zimbabwe	1998	1992
Last updated: 12 June 2026

=== First Test match wins ===
Opponent	Home		Away	
Opponent	Venue	Year	Venue	Year
Afghanistan	YTP	YTP	YTP	YTP
Australia	Christchurch	1974	Brisbane	1985
Bangladesh	Hamilton	2001	Dhaka	2004
England	Wellington	1978	Leeds	1983
India	Christchurch	1968	Nagpur	1969
Ireland	YTP	YTP	Belfast	2026
Pakistan	Auckland	1985	Lahore	1969
South Africa	Auckland	2004	Cape Town	1961
Sri Lanka	Christchurch	1983	Kandy	1984
West Indies	Auckland	1956	Bridgetown	2002
Zimbabwe	Wellington	1998	Harare	1992
Last updated: 16 February 2024

=== Team scoring records ===
==== Most runs in an innings ====
The highest innings score by the Blackcaps is 715/6d in first Test of the 2018–19 series against Bangladesh 2019.

Rank	Score	Opposition	Venue	Date
1	715/6d	Bangladesh	Seddon Park, Hamilton, New Zealand	28 February 2019
2	690	Pakistan	Sharjah Cricket Stadium, Sharjah, UAE	26 November 2014
3	680/8d	India	Basin Reserve, Wellington, New Zealand	14 February 2014
4	671/4	Sri Lanka	Basin Reserve, Wellington, New Zealand	31 January 1991
5	659/6d	Pakistan	Hagley Oval, Christchurch, New Zealand	5 January 2021
Last updated: 5 January 2021

==== Highest successful run chases ====
New Zealand's highest fourth innings total is 451 all out in an unsuccessful run chase against England at Christchurch in March 2002. England had set a target of 549. New Zealand's highest successful run chase occurred against Pakistan at Christchurch in 1994. Pakistan had set New Zealand a target of 324.

Rank	Score	Target	Opposition	Venue	Date
1	324/5	324	Pakistan	Lancaster Park, Christchurch, New Zealand	24 February 1994
2	317/7	317	Bangladesh	Chittagong Divisional Stadium, Chittagong, Bangladesh	17 October 2008
3	285/8	285	Sri Lanka	Basin Reserve, Wellington, New Zealand	9 March 2023
4	278/8	278	Pakistan	Carisbrook, Dunedin, New Zealand	9 February 1985
5	269/3	267	South Africa	Seddon Park, Hamilton, New Zealand	16 February 2024
Last updated: 16 February 2024

==== Fewest runs in an innings ====
The lowest innings total scored in Test cricket came in the second Test of England's tour of New Zealand in March 1955. Trailing England by 46, New Zealand was bowled out in their second innings for 26 runs.

Rank	Score	Opposition	Venue	Date
1	26♠	England	Eden Park, Auckland, New Zealand	25 March 1955
2	42	Australia	Basin Reserve, Wellington, New Zealand	29 March 1946
2	45	South Africa	Newlands Cricket Ground, Cape Town, South Africa	2 January 2013
4	47	England	Lord's, London, England	19 June 1958
5	54	Australia	Basin Reserve, Wellington, New Zealand	29 March 1946
Last updated: 23 June 2020

==== Most runs conceded in an innings ====
The highest innings total scored against New Zealand is by West Indies when they scored 660/5d in the second Test of the West Indies tour of New Zealand in 1995 at Basin Reserve.

Rank	Score	Opposition	Venue	Date
1	720/9d	India	Basin Reserve, Wellington, New Zealand	19 November 2026
2	660/5d	West Indies	Basin Reserve, Wellington, New Zealand	10 February 1995
3	643	Pakistan	Gaddafi Stadium, Lahore, Pakistan	1 May 2002
4	621/5d	South Africa	Eden Park, Auckland, New Zealand	27 February 1999
5	616/5d	Pakistan	Eden Park, Auckland, New Zealand	24 February 1989
Last updated: 22 November 2026

==== Fewest runs conceded in an innings ====
The lowest innings total scored against New Zealand is 46 by India where New Zealand tour of India in 2024

Rank	Score	Opposition	Venue	Date
1	46	India	M.Chinnaswamy Stadium, Bengaluru, India	16 October 2024
2	51	Zimbabwe	McLean Park, Napier, New Zealand	26 January 2012
3	58	England	Eden Park, Auckland, New Zealand	23 March 2018
4	59	Zimbabwe	Harare Sports Club, Harare, Zimbabwe	7 August 2005
5	64	England	Basin Reserve, Wellington, New Zealand	10 February 1978
Last updated: 3 December 2017

=== Result records ===
A Test match is won when one side has scored more runs than the total runs scored by the opposing side during their two innings. If both sides have completed both their allocated innings and the side that fielded last has the higher aggregate of runs, it is known as a win by runs. This indicates the number of runs that they had scored more than the opposing side. If one side scores more runs in a single innings than the total runs scored by the other side in both their innings, it is known as a win by innings and runs. If the side batting last wins the match, it is known as a win by wickets, indicating the number of wickets that were still to fall.

==== Greatest win margins (by innings) ====
The fifth Test of the 1938 Ashes series at The Oval saw England win by an innings and 579 runs, the largest victory by an innings in Test cricket history. The largest victory for New Zealand, which is the 3rd largest, is their win against Zimbabwe in the second Test of the 2025 tour at Bulawayo, where the tourists won by an innings and 359 runs.

Rank	Margin	Opposition	Venue	Date
1	Innings and 359 runs	Zimbabwe	Queens Sports Club, Bulawayo, Zimbabwe	9 August 2025
2	Innings and 301 runs	Zimbabwe	McLean Park, Napier, New Zealand	12 January 2012
3	Innings and 294 runs	Zimbabwe	Harare Sports Club, Harare, Zimbabwe	7 August 2005
4	Innings and 276 runs	South Africa	Hagley Oval, Christchurch, New Zealand	17 February 2022
5	Innings and 185 runs	Pakistan	Seddon Park, Hamilton, New Zealand	27 March 2001
Last updated: 9 August 2025

==== Greatest win margins (by runs) ====
The greatest winning margin by runs in Test cricket was England's victory over Australia by 675 runs in the first Test of the 1928–29 Ashes series. The largest victory recorded by New Zealand, which is the 8th largest victory, was recorded against Sri Lanka in the second and final Test of the 2018-19 tour at the Hagley Oval, where the hosts won by 423 runs.

Rank	Margin	Opposition	Venue	Date
1	423 runs	Sri Lanka	Hagley Oval, Christchurch, New Zealand	30 December 2018
1	423 runs	England	Seddon Park, Hamilton, New Zealand	17 December 2024
3	323 runs	West Indies	Bay Oval, Tauranga, New Zealand	22 December 2025
4	281 runs	South Africa	Bay Oval, Tauranga, New Zealand	7 February 2024
5	254 runs	Zimbabwe	Queens Sports Club, Bulawayo, Zimbabwe	6 August 2016
Last updated: 24 December 2025

==== Greatest win margins (by 10 wickets) ====
New Zealand have won a Test match by a margin of 10 wickets on 5 occasions.

Rank	Number of Victories	Opposition	Most Recent Venue	Date
1	3	India	Basin Reserve, Wellington, New Zealand	21 February 2020
2	1	Zimbabwe	Basin Reserve, Wellington, New Zealand	19 February 1998
2	1	West Indies	Basin Reserve, Wellington, New Zealand	17 March 2006
Last updated: 3 December 2017

==== Narrowest win margins (by runs) ====
New Zealand's narrowest win was by 1 run (the second such victory in Test history, after West Indies), against England in a match in February 2023. England made 435 runs in first innings. In response, New Zealand were dismissed for 209 and were asked to follow-on. In the second innings, New Zealand scored 483 runs to set a target of 257 runs to win for England, which they fell one run short of.

Rank	Margin	Opposition	Venue	Date
1	1 run	England	Basin Reserve, Wellington, New Zealand	28 February 2023
2	4 runs	Pakistan	Sheikh Zayed Cricket Stadium, Abu Dhabi, UAE	16 November 2018
3	7 runs	Australia	Bellerive Oval, Hobart, Australia	9 December 2011
4	25 runs	India	Wankhede Stadium, Mumbai, India	1 November 2024
5	27 runs	West Indies	Eden Park, Auckland, New Zealand	9 March 2006
Last updated: 28 February 2023

==== Narrowest win margins (by wickets) ====
New Zealand's narrowest win by wickets came in the first Test of the West Indies cricket team in New Zealand in 1979-80 in February 1980. Played at the Carisbrook, the hosts won the match by a margin of one wicket, one of only fourteen one-wicket victories in Test cricket.

Rank	Margin	Opposition	Venue	Date
1	1 wicket	West Indies	Carisbrook, Dunedin, New Zealand	8 February 1980
2	2 wickets	Pakistan	Carisbrook, Dunedin, New Zealand	9 February 1985
3	3 wickets	Bangladesh	Chittagong Divisional Stadium, Chittagong, Bangladesh	17 October 2008
4	4 wickets	India	Basin Reserve, Wellington, New Zealand	26 December 1998
4	4 wickets	India	Seddon Park, Hamilton, New Zealand	19 December 2002
Last updated: 20 June 2020

==== Greatest loss margins (by innings) ====
The Oval in London played host the greatest defeat by an innings in Test cricket. The final Test of the 1938 Ashes saw England defeat the tourists by an innings and 579 runs, to the draw the series at one match all. New Zealand's biggest defeat came during the Pakistan tour in 2002 when they lost by an innings and 324 runs at Lahore Stadium, Lahore.

Rank	Margin	Opposition	Venue	Date
1	Innings and 324 runs	Pakistan	Lahore Stadium, Lahore, Pakistan	1 May 2002
2	Innings and 322 runs	West Indies	Basin Reserve, Wellington, New Zealand	10 February 1995
3	Innings and 222 runs	Australia	Bellerive Oval, Hobart, Australia	26 November 1993
4	Innings and 215 runs	England	Eden Park, Auckland, New Zealand	23 February 1963
5	Innings and 198 runs	India	Vidarbha Cricket Association Stadium, Nagpur, India	20 November 2010
Last updated: 20 June 2020

==== Greatest loss margins (by runs) ====
The first Test of the 1928–29 Ashes series saw Australia defeated by England by 675 runs, the greatest losing margin by runs in Test cricket. New Zealand's biggest defeat by runs was against South Africa in the first Test of the 2007 tour at New Wanderers Stadium.

Rank	Margin	Opposition	Venue	Date
1	372 runs	India	Wankhede Stadium, Mumbai, India	3 December 2021
2	358 runs	South Africa	New Wanderers Stadium, Johannesburg, South Africa	8 November 2007
3	299 runs	Pakistan	Eden Park, Auckland, New Zealand	8 March 2001
4	297 runs	Australia	Eden Park, Auckland, New Zealand	22 March 1974
5	272 runs	India	Eden Park, Auckland, New Zealand	7 March 1968
Last updated: 6 December 2021

==== Greatest loss margins (by 10 wickets) ====
New Zealand have lost a Test match by a margin of 10 wickets on 13 occasions with most recent being during the 2nd test of the New Zealand cricket team in the West Indies in 2014.

Rank	Margin	Opposition	Venue	Date
1	5	West Indies	Queen's Park Oval, Port of Spain, Trinidad	16 June 2014
2	3	Australia	Basin Reserve, Wellington, New Zealand	19 March 2010
3	2	India	Seddon Park, Hamilton, New Zealand	18 March 2009
3	2	Pakistan	Seddon Park, Hamilton, New Zealand	7 January 2011
5	1	Sri Lanka	Galle International Stadium, Galle, Sri Lanka	17 November 2012
Last updated: 20 June 2020

==== Narrowest loss margins (by runs) ====
The narrowest loss of New Zealand in terms of runs is by 30 runs against South Africa in the first test of the New Zealand's tour of South Africa in 1961.

Rank	Margin	Opposition	Venue	Date
1	30 runs	South Africa	Kingsmead, Durban, South Africa	8 December 1961
2	33 runs	Pakistan	Seddon Park, Hamilton, New Zealand	2 January 1993
3	38 runs	England	Trent Bridge, Nottingham, England	7 June 1973
4	60 runs	India	Brabourne Stadium, Mumbai, India	25 September 1969
5	62 runs	Australia	Eden Park, Auckland, New Zealand	11 March 2000
Last updated: 20 June 2020

==== Narrowest loss margins (by wickets) ====
The narrowest loss of New Zealand in terms of wickets is by 3 wickets against Australia in the third test of New Zealand cricket team in Australia in 2015–16.

Rank	Margin	Opposition	Venue	Date
1	3 wicket	Australia	Adelaide Oval, Adelaide, Australia	27 November 2015
2	4 wickets	Pakistan	Bagh-e-Jinnah, Lahore, Pakistan	26 October 1955
2	4 wickets	Australia	Sydney Cricket Ground, Sydney, Australia	22 November 1985
2	4 wickets	England	Lancaster Park, Christchurch, New Zealand	14 February 1997
2	4 wickets	England	Trent Bridge, Nottingham, England	10 June 2004
2	4 wickets	South Africa	New Wanderers Stadium, Johannesburg, South Africa	5 May 2006
Last updated: 20 June 2020

== Batting records ==
=== Most career runs ===
A run is the basic means of scoring in cricket. A run is scored when the batsman hits the ball with his bat and with his partner runs the length of 22 yards (20 m) of the pitch. India's Sachin Tendulkar has scored the most runs in Test cricket with 15,921. Second is Joe Root of England with about 14,000 ahead of Ricky Ponting from Australia in third with 13,378.

Rank	Runs	Player	Matches	Innings	Period
1	9,515	Kane Williamson	110	195	2010–2026
2	7,683	Ross Taylor	112	196	2007–2022
3	7,172	Stephen Fleming	111	189	1994–2008
4	6,453	Brendon McCullum	101	176	2004–2016
5	6,450	Tom Latham†	95	171	2014–2026
6	5,444	Martin Crowe	77	131	1982–1995
7	5,334	John Wright	82	148	1978–1993
8	4,702	Nathan Astle	81	137	1996–2006
9	4,523	Daniel Vettori	112	172	1997–2014
10	3,790	BJ Watling	75	117	2009–2021
Last updated: 30 June 2026

=== Fastest runs getter ===
Runs	Batsman	Match	Innings	Record Date	Reference
1,000	Devon Conway	11	19	27 December 2022	
2,000	Andrew Jones	24	44	1 November 1992	
3,000	Kane Williamson	39	71	3 January 2015	
4,000	Kane Williamson	48	89	20 February 2016	
5,000	Kane Williamson	61	110	25 March 2017	
6,000	Kane Williamson	71	126	28 February 2019	
7,000	Kane Williamson	83	144	3 January 2021	
8,000	Kane Williamson	94	164	17 March 2023	
9,000	Kane Williamson	103	182	30 November 2024	
Last updated: 01 December 2024

=== Most runs in each batting position ===
Batting position	Batsman	Innings	Runs	Average	Test Career Span	Ref
Opener	Tom Latham†	170	6,434	38.47	2014–2024	
Number 3	Kane Williamson†	166	8,658	57.72	2011–2024	
Number 4	Ross Taylor	174	7,087	47.24	2007–2022	
Number 5	Nathan Astle	87	3,181	37.87	1996–2006	
Number 6	Craig McMillan	51	1,899	41.28	1997–2005	
Number 7	BJ Watling	59	1,780	35.60	2021–2021	
Number 8	Daniel Vettori	67	2,227	39.77	1997–2014	
Number 9	Tim Southee	90	1,245	14.82	2008–2024	
Number 10	Neil Wagner	50	594	18.56	2013–2024	
Number 11	Trent Boult	81	644	16.10	2012–2022	
Last updated: 26 October 2024.

=== Most runs against each team ===
Opposition	Runs	Player	Matches	Innings	Period	Ref
Afghanistan	YTP					
Australia	1,277	John Wright	19	36	1980–1993	
Bangladesh	822	Kane Williamson†	8	12	2013–2023	
England	1,518	John Wright	23	43	1978–1992	
India	1,224	Brendon McCullum	10	19	2009–2014	
Ireland	186	Tom Blundell†	1	1	2026–2026	
Pakistan	1,519	Kane Williamson†	14	25	2011–2023	
South Africa	1,072	Stephen Fleming	15	27	1994–2007	
Sri Lanka	1,467	Kane Williamson†	14	25	2012–2024	
West Indies	1,155	Kane Williamson†	13	23	2012–2025	
Zimbabwe	813	Nathan Astle	11	17	1996–2005	
Last updated: 8 June 2026.

=== Highest individual score ===
The second test of the Indian cricket team in New Zealand in 2013–14 saw Brendon McCullum score his first and New Zealand's only triple century and record New Zealand's highest Individual score.

Rank	Runs	Player	Opposition	Venue	Date
1	302	Brendon McCullum	India	Basin Reserve, Wellington, New Zealand	14 February 2014
2	299	Martin Crowe	Sri Lanka	Basin Reserve, Wellington, New Zealand	31 January 1991
3	290	Ross Taylor	Australia	WACA Ground, Perth, Australia	13 November 2015
4	274*	Stephen Fleming	Sri Lanka	P Sara Oval, Colombo, Sri Lanka	25 April 2003
5	267*	Bryan Young	Sri Lanka	Carisbrook, Dunedin, New Zealand	7 March 1997
Last updated: 20 June 2020

=== Highest individual score – progression of record ===
Runs	Player	Opponent	Venue	Season
45*	Roger Blunt	England	Lancaster Park, Christchurch, New Zealand	1929–30
136	Stewie Dempster	England	Basin Reserve, Wellington, New Zealand	1929–30
206	Martin Donnelly	England	Lord's, London, England	1949
230	Bert Sutcliffe	India	Feroz Shah Kotla Ground, Delhi, India	1955–56
239	Graham Dowling	India	Lancaster Park, Christchurch, New Zealand	1967−68
259	Glenn Turner	West Indies	Bourda, Georgetown, Guyana	1972
299	Martin Crowe	Sri Lanka	Basin Reserve, Wellington, New Zealand	1990−91
302	Brendon McCullum	India	Basin Reserve, Wellington, New Zealand	2013–14
Last updated: 20 June 2020

=== Highest individual score against each team ===
Opposition	Runs	Player	Venue	Date	Ref
Afghanistan	YTP				
Australia	290	Ross Taylor	WACA Ground, Perth, Australia	15 November 2015	
Bangladesh	252	Tom Latham	Hagley Oval, Christchurch, New Zealand	9 January 2022	
England	222	Nathan Astle	Lancaster Park, Christchurch, New Zealand	13 March 2002	
India	302	Brendon McCullum	Basin Reserve, Wellington, New Zealand	14 February 2014	
Ireland	186	Tom Blundell (cricketer)	Stormont Cricket Ground, Belfast, United Kingdom	28 May 2026	
Pakistan	238	Kane Williamson	Hagley Oval, Christchurch, New Zealand	3 January 2021	
South Africa	262	Stephen Fleming	Newlands, Cape Town, South Africa	27 April 2006	
Sri Lanka	299	Martin Crowe	Basin Reserve, Wellington, New Zealand	31 January 1991	
West Indies	259	Glenn Turner	Bourda, Georgetown, Guyana	6 April 1972	
Zimbabwe	173*	Ross Taylor	Queens Sports Club, Bulawayo, Zimbabwe	28 July 2016	
Last updated: 11 January 2022.

=== Highest career average ===
A batsman's batting average is the total number of runs they have scored divided by the number of times they have been dismissed.

Rank	Average	Player	Innings	Runs	Not out	Period
1	54.88	Kane Williamson†	186	9,276	17	2010–2024
2	46.28	John F. Reid	31	1,296	3	1979–1986
3	45.36	Martin Crowe	131	5,444	11	1982–1995
4	44.77	Mark Richardson	65	2,776	3	2000–2004
Qualification: 20 innings. Last updated: 26 October 2024

=== Highest average in each batting position ===
Batting position	Batsman	Innings	Runs	Average	Career Span	Ref
Opener	Glenn Turner	67	2,828	45.61	1969–1983	
Number 3	Kane Williamson†	166	8,658	57.72	2010–2024	
Number 4	Martin Crowe	106	4,841	49.40	1982–1995	
Number 5	Brendon McCullum	44	1,887	43.88	2007–2016	
Number 6	Jeremy Coney	48	1,772	45.43	1974–1987	
Number 7	Chris Cairns	41	1,766	43.07	1989–2004	
Number 8	Daniel Vettori	67	2,227	39.77	1997–2014	
Number 9	Ian Smith	36	797	28.46	1980–1992	
Number 10	Neil Wagner	50	594	18.56	2013–2024	
Number 11	Trent Boult	75	589	15.91	2011–2022	
Last updated: 30 September 2024. Qualification: Min 20 innings batted at position

=== Most half-centuries ===
A half-century is a score of between 50 and 99 runs. Statistically, once a batsman's score reaches 100, it is no longer considered a half-century but a century.

Sachin Tendulkar of India has scored the most half-centuries in Test cricket with 68. He is followed by the West Indies' Shivnarine Chanderpaul on 66, India's Rahul Dravid and Allan Border of Australia on 63 and in fifth with 62 fifties to his name, Australia's Ricky Ponting.

Rank	Half centuries	Player	Innings	Runs	Period
1	46	Stephen Fleming	189	7,172	1994–2008
2	38	Kane Williamson†	187	9,328	2010–2025
3	35	Ross Taylor	196	7,683	2007–2022
4=	31	Brendon McCullum	176	6,453	2004–2016
4=	31	Tom Latham†	159	5,858	2014–2025
Last updated: 02 December 2025

=== Most centuries ===
A century is a score of 100 or more runs in a single innings.

Tendulkar has also scored the most centuries in Test cricket with 51. South Africa's Jacques Kallis is next on 45 and Ricky Ponting with 41 hundreds is in third.

Rank	Centuries	Player	Innings	Runs	Period
1	33	Kane Williamson	195	9,515	2010–2026
2	19	Ross Taylor	196	7,683	2007–2022
3=	17	Martin Crowe	131	5,444	1982–1995
3=	17	Tom Latham†	171	6,450	2014–2026
5	12	John Wright	148	5,334	1978–1993
5	12	Brendon McCullum	176	6,453	2004–2016
5	12	Henry Nicholls	95	3,471	2016–2026
Last updated: 19 November 2026

=== Most double centuries ===
A double century is a score of 200 or more runs in a single innings.

Bradman holds the Test record for the most double centuries scored with twelve, one ahead of Sri Lanka's Kumar Sangakkara who finished his career with eleven. In third is Brian Lara of the West Indies with nine. England's Wally Hammond, Mahela Jayawardene of Sri Lanka and Virat Kohli of India scored seven double centuries.

Rank	Double centuries	Player	Innings	Runs	Period
1	6	Kane Williamson†	191	9,421	2010–2025
2	4	Brendon McCullum	176	6,453	2004–2016
3	3	Stephen Fleming	189	7,172	1994–2008
3	3	Ross Taylor	196	7,683	2007–2022
5	2	Glenn Turner	73	2,991	1969–1983
5	2	Mathew Sinclair	56	1,635	1999–2010
5	2	Tom Latham†	163	6,160	2014–2025
5	2	Devon Conway†	59	2,433	2021–2025
Last updated: 19 December 2025

=== Most triple centuries ===
A triple century is a score of 300 or more runs in a single innings.

India's Virender Sehwag, Australia's Don Bradman and West Indies's Chris Gayle and Brian Lara have each scored two triple centuries. Brendon McCullum is the only New Zealand Player who has scored a single Test triple century as of September 2020.

Rank	Triple centuries	Player	Innings	Runs	Period
1	1	Brendon McCullum	176	6,453	2004–2016
Last updated: 20 June 2020

=== Most Sixes ===
Rank	Sixes	Player	Innings	Runs	Period
1	107	Brendon McCullum	176	6,453	2004–2016
2	98	Tim Southee	148	2,245	2008–2024
3	87	Chris Cairns	104	3,320	1989–2004
4	55	Ross Taylor	196	7,683	2007–2022
5	54	Craig McMillan	91	3,116	1997–2005
Last updated: 17 December 2024

=== Most Fours ===
Rank	Fours	Player	Innings	Runs	Period
1	982	Kane Williamson†	180	8,881	2010–2024
2	932	Ross Taylor	196	7,683	2007–2022
3	917	Stephen Fleming	189	7,172	1994–2008
4	776	Brendon McCullum	176	6,453	2004–2016
5	659	Martin Crowe	131	5,444	1982–1995
Last updated: 30 September 2024

=== Most runs in a series ===
The 1930 Ashes series in England saw Don Bradman set the record for the most runs scored in a single series, falling just 26 short of 1,000 runs. He is followed by Wally Hammond with 905 runs scored in the 1928–29 Ashes series. Glenn Turner with 672 in the 1972 tour of West Indies is the highest New Zealander on the list.

Rank	Runs	Player	Matches	Innings	Opposition	Series
1	672	Glenn Turner	5	8	West Indies	New Zealand cricket team in the West Indies in 1971–72
2	611	Bert Sutcliffe	5	9	India	New Zealand cricket team in India in 1955–56
3	546	John R. Reid	5	10	South Africa	New Zealand cricket team in South Africa in 1961–62
4	538	Daryl Mitchell	3	6	England	New Zealand cricket team in England in 2022
5	535	Brendon McCullum	2	4	India	Indian cricket team in New Zealand in 2013–14
Last updated: 30 June 2022

=== Most ducks ===
A duck refers to a batsman being dismissed without scoring a run. Chris Martin has scored the second-highest number of ducks in Test cricket behind Courtney Walsh.

Rank	Ducks	Player	Matches	Innings	Period
1	36	Chris Martin	71	104	2000–2013
2	24	Danny Morrison	48	71	1987–1997
3	21	Tim Southee	107	156	2008–2024
4	19	Daniel Vettori	112	172	1997–2014
5	17	Neil Wagner	64	84	2012–2024
Last updated: 17 December 2024

=== Highest partnerships by wicket ===
In cricket, two batsmen are always present at the crease batting together in a partnership. This partnership will continue until one of them is dismissed, retires or the innings comes to a close.

A wicket partnership describes the number of runs scored before each wicket falls. The first wicket partnership is between the opening batsmen and continues until the first wicket falls. The second wicket partnership then commences between the not out batsman and the number three batsman. This partnership continues until the second wicket falls. The third wicket partnership then commences between the not out batsman and the new batsman. This continues down to the tenth wicket partnership. When the tenth wicket has fallen, there is no batsman left to partner so the innings is closed.

Wicket	Runs	First batsman	Second batsman	Opposition	Venue	Date	Scorecard
1st wicket	413	Glenn Turner	Terry Jarvis	West Indies	Bourda, Georgetown, Guyana	6 April 1972	Scorecard
2nd wicket	297	Brendon McCullum	Kane Williamson†	Pakistan	Sharjah Cricket Stadium, Sharjah, UAE	26 November 2014	Scorecard
3rd wicket	467	Andrew Jones	Martin Crowe	Sri Lanka	Basin Reserve, Wellington, New Zealand	31 January 1991	Scorecard
4th wicket	369	Kane Williamson†	Henry Nicholls†	Pakistan	Hagley Oval, Christchurch, New Zealand	3 January 2021	Scorecard
5th wicket	236	Daryl Mitchell	Tom Blundell	England	Nottingham, England	10 June 2022	Scorecard
6th wicket	365*	Kane Williamson†	BJ Watling	Sri Lanka	Basin Reserve, Wellington, New Zealand	3 January 2015	Scorecard
7th wicket	261	Mitchell Santner†	BJ Watling	England	Bay Oval, Mount Maunganui, New Zealand	21 November 2019	Scorecard
8th wicket	256	Stephen Fleming	James Franklin	South Africa	Newlands Cricket Ground, Cape Town, South Africa	27 April 2006	Scorecard
9th wicket	136	Ian Smith	Martin Snedden	India	Eden Park, Auckland, New Zealand	22 February 1990	Scorecard
10th wicket	151	Brian Hastings	Richard Collinge	Pakistan	Eden Park, Auckland, New Zealand	16 February 1973	Scorecard
Last updated: 20 June 2020

=== Highest partnerships by runs ===
The highest Test partnership by runs for any wicket is held by the Sri Lankan pairing of Kumar Sangakkara and Mahela Jayawardene who put together a third wicket partnership of 624 runs during the first Test against South Africa in July 2006. This broke the record of 576 runs set by their compatriots Sanath Jayasuriya and Roshan Mahanama against India in 1997. New Zealand's Andrew Jones and Martin Crowe hold the third highest Test partnership with 467 made in 1991 against Sri Lanka.

Wicket	Runs	First batsman	Second batsman	Opposition	Venue	Date	Scorecard
3rd wicket	467	Andrew Jones	Martin Crowe	Sri Lanka	Basin Reserve, Wellington, New Zealand	31 January 1991	Scorecard
1st wicket	413	Glenn Turner	Terry Jarvis	West Indies	Bourda, Georgetown, Guyana	6 April 1972	Scorecard
4th wicket	369	Kane Williamson	Henry Nicholls	Pakistan	Hagley Oval, Christchurch, New Zealand	3 January 2021	Scorecard
6th wicket	365*	Kane Williamson	BJ Watling	Sri Lanka	Basin Reserve, Wellington, New Zealand	3 January 2015	Scorecard
3rd wicket	363	Kane Williamson	Henry Nicholls	Sri Lanka	Basin Reserve, Wellington, New Zealand	17 March 2023	
Last updated: 17 March 2023

=== Highest overall partnership runs by a pair ===
Rank	Runs	Innings	Players	Highest	Average	100/50	Career span
1	3,882	76	Ross Taylor & Kane Williamson	265	58.81	10/19	2011-2021
2	3,473	79	Tom Latham & Kane Williamson †	165	43.96	10/16	2014–2025
3	2,223	50	Tom Latham & Devon Conway	323	45.16	6/8	2021-2025
4	1,951	58	Nathan Astle & Stephen Fleming	106	33.63	2/15	1996-2006
5	1,803	28	Martin Crowe & Andrew Jones	467	64.39	4/6	1987-1993
An asterisk (*) signifies an unbroken partnership (i.e. neither of the batsmen was dismissed before either the end of the allotted overs or the required score being reached). Last updated: 18 December 2025

== Bowling records ==
=== Most career wickets ===
A bowler takes the wicket of a batsman when the form of dismissal is bowled, caught, leg before wicket, stumped or hit wicket. If the batsman is dismissed by run out, obstructing the field, handling the ball, hitting the ball twice or timed out the bowler does not receive credit.

Shane Warne held the record for the most Test wickets with 708 until December 2007 when Sri Lankan bowler Muttiah Muralitharan passed Warne's milestone. Muralitharan, who continued to play until 2010, finished with 800 wickets to his name. James Anderson of England is third on the list with 704 wickets, which is the record for most wickets by a fast bowler in Test cricket. New Zealand's Richard Hadlee is the highest ranked New Zealand bowler taking 431 wickets.

Rank	Wickets	Player	Matches	Innings	Average	Period
1	431	Richard Hadlee	86	150	22.29	1973–1990
2	391	Tim Southee	107	203	30.26	2008–2024
3	361	Daniel Vettori	112	185	34.15	1997–2014
4	317	Trent Boult	78	149	27.49	2011–2022
5	260	Neil Wagner	64	122	27.57	2012–2024
6	233	Chris Martin	71	126	33.81	2000–2013
7	218	Chris Cairns	62	104	29.40	1989–2004
8	160	Danny Morrison	48	76	34.68	1987–1997
9	136	Matt Henry†	32	63	27.40	2015–2025
10	130	Lance Cairns	43	72	32.92	1974–1985
Last updated: 9 August 2025

=== Most career wickets against each team ===
Opposition	Wickets	Player	Matches	Innings	Average	Period	Ref
Afghanistan	YTP						
Australia	130	Richard Hadlee	23	41	20.56	1973–1990	
Bangladesh	51	Daniel Vettori	9	17	16.05	2001–2010	
England	97	Richard Hadlee	21	35	24.73	1973–1990	
India	65	Richard Hadlee	14	24	22.96	1976–1990	
Ireland	YTP						
Pakistan	51	Richard Hadlee	12	20	28.39	1973–1989	
South Africa	55	Chris Martin	14	24	26.72	2000–2013	
Sri Lanka	66	Tim Southee	14	26	19.83	2012–2024	
West Indies	51	Richard Hadlee	10	19	22.03	1980–1987	
Zimbabwe	39	Chris Cairns	8	16	24.20	1996–2000	
Last updated: 27 September 2024

=== Fastest wicket taker ===
Wickets	Bowler	Match	Record Date	Reference
50	Kyle Jamieson	9	26 November 2021	
100	Richard Hadlee	25	16 February 1979	
150	Richard Hadlee	34	6 March 1981	
200	Richard Hadlee	44	25 August 1983	
250	Richard Hadlee	53	9 February 1985	
300	Richard Hadlee	61	21 February 1986	
350	Richard Hadlee	69	12 March 1987	
400	Richard Hadlee	80	2 February 1990	
Last updated: 20 June 2020

=== Best figures in an innings ===
Bowling figures refers to the number of the wickets a bowler has taken and the number of runs conceded. There have been three occasions in Test cricket where a bowler has taken all ten wickets in a single innings – Jim Laker of England took 10/53 against Australia in 1956, India's Anil Kumble in 1999 returned figures of 10/74 against Pakistan and New Zealand's Ajaz Patel in 2021, returning figures of 10/119 against India. Richard Hadlee is one of 15 bowlers who have taken nine wickets in a Test match innings.

Rank	Figures	Player	Opposition	Venue	Date
1	10/119	Ajaz Patel†	India	Wankhede Stadium, Mumbai, India	3 December 2021
2	9/52	Richard Hadlee	Australia	Brisbane Cricket Ground, Brisbane, Australia	8 November 1985
3	7/23	Richard Hadlee	India	Basin Reserve, Wellington, New Zealand	13 February 1976
3	7/23	Matt Henry	South Africa	Hagley Oval, Christchurch, New Zealand	17 February 2022
5	7/27	Chris Cairns	West Indies	Seddon Park, Hamilton, New Zealand	16 December 1999
Last updated: 23 July 2025

=== Best figures in an innings against each team ===
Opposition	Figures	Player	Venue	Date	Reference
Afghanistan	YTP				
Australia	9/52	Richard Hadlee	Brisbane Cricket Ground, Brisbane, Australia	8 November 1985	
Bangladesh	7/53	Chris Cairns	Seddon Park, Hamilton, New Zealand	18 December 2001	
England	7/74	Lance Cairns	Headingley, Leeds, England	28 July 1983	
India	10/119	Ajaz Patel	Wankhede Stadium, Mumbai, India	3 December 2021	
Ireland	YTP				
Pakistan	7/52	Chris Pringle	Iqbal Stadium, Faisalabad, Pakistan	26 October 1990	
South Africa	7/23	Matt Henry	Hagley Oval, Christchurch, New Zealand	17 February 2022	
Sri Lanka	7/130	Daniel Vettori	Basin Reserve, Wellington, New Zealand	15 December 2006	
West Indies	7/27	Chris Cairns	Seddon Park, Hamilton, New Zealand	16 December 1999	
Zimbabwe	6/26	Chris Martin	McLean Park, Napier, New Zealand	26 January 2012	
Last updated: 19 January 2022

=== Best figures in a match ===
A bowler's bowling figures in a match is the sum of the wickets taken and the runs conceded over both innings.

No bowler in the history of Test cricket has taken all 20 wickets in a match. The closest to do so was English spin bowler Jim Laker. During the fourth Test of the 1956 Ashes series, Laker took 9/37 in the first innings and 10/53 in the second to finish with match figures of 19/90. Richard Hadlee's figures of 15/123 taken during the first match of the New Zealand tour of Australia in 1985, is the 10th best in Test cricket history.

Rank	Figures	Player	Opposition	Venue	Date
1	15/123	Richard Hadlee	Australia	Brisbane Cricket Ground, Brisbane, Australia	8 November 1985
2	14/225	Ajaz Patel	India	Wankhede Stadium, Mumbai, India	3 December 2021
3	13/157	Mitchell Santner	India	Maharashtra Cricket Association Stadium, Pune, India	26 October 2024
4	12/149	Daniel Vettori	Australia	Eden Park, Auckland, New Zealand	11 March 2000
5	12/170	Daniel Vettori	Bangladesh	M. A. Aziz Stadium, Chittagong, Bangladesh	26 October 2004
Last updated: 26 October 2024

=== Best career average ===
A bowler's bowling average is the total number of runs they have conceded divided by the number of wickets they have taken. Nineteenth century English medium pacer George Lohmann holds the record for the best career average in Test cricket with 10.75. J. J. Ferris, one of fifteen cricketers to have played Test cricket for more than one team, is second behind Lohmann with an overall career average of 12.70 runs per wicket.

Rank	Average	Player	Wickets	Runs	Balls	Period
1	19.73	Kyle Jamieson†	80	1,579	3,558	2020–2024
2	21.53	Jack Cowie	45	969	2,028	1937–1949
3	22.09	Shane Bond	87	1,922	3,372	2001–2009
4	22.29	Richard Hadlee	431	9,611	21,918	1973–1990
5	26.60	Bruce Taylor	111	2,953	6,334	1965-1973
Qualification: 2,000 balls. Last updated: 4 February 2024

=== Best career economy rate ===
A bowler's economy rate is the total number of runs they have conceded divided by the number of overs they have bowled. English bowler William Attewell, who played 10 matches for England between 1884 and 1892, holds the Test record for the best career economy rate with 1.31. New Zealand's Jeremy Coney, with a rate of 2.04 runs per over conceded over his 52-match Test career, is 43rd on the list.

Rank	Economy rate	Player	Wickets	Runs	Balls	Period
1	2.04	Jeremy Coney	27	966	2,835	1974–1987
2	2.15	Hedley Howarth	86	3,178	8,833	1969–1977
3	2.16	Harry Cave	34	1,467	4,074	1949–1958
4	2.20	John Reid	85	2,835	7,725	1949–1965
5	2.26	Nathan Astle	51	2,143	7,725	1996–2006
Qualification: 2,000 balls. Last updated: 20 June 2020

=== Best career strike rate ===
A bowler's strike rate is the total number of balls they have bowled divided by the number of wickets they have taken. As with the career average above, the top bowler with the best Test career strike rate is George Lohmann with strike rate of 34.1 balls per wicket. New Zealand's Shane Bond is at third position in this list.

Rank	Strike rate	Player	Wickets	Runs	Balls	Period
1	38.8	Shane Bond	87	1,922	3,372	2001–2009
2	44.5	Kyle Jamieson†	80	1,579	3,558	2020–2024
3	45.1	Jack Cowie	45	969	2,028	1937–1949
4	50.9	Richard Hadlee	431	9,611	21,918	1973–1990
5	52.8	Neil Wagner	260	7,169	13,725	2012–2024
Qualification: 2,000 balls. Last updated: 23 July 2025

=== Most five-wicket hauls in an innings ===
A five-wicket haul refers to a bowler taking five wickets in a single innings. Richard Hadlee is third on the list of most five-wicket hauls behind Sri Lanka's Muttiah Muralitharan and Australia's Shane Warne in Test cricket.

Rank	Five-wicket hauls	Player	Innings	Balls	Wickets	Period
1	36	Richard Hadlee	150	21,918	431	1973–1990
2	20	Daniel Vettori	185	28,652	361	1997–2014
3	15	Tim Southee	195	23,034	384	2008–2024
4	13	Chris Cairns	104	11,698	218	1989–2004
5	10	Danny Morrison	76	10,064	160	1987–1997
Last updated: 19 October 2024

=== Most ten-wicket hauls in a match ===
A ten-wicket haul refers to a bowler taking ten or more wickets in a match over two innings. Richard Hadlee is third on the all-time list of the most ten-wicket hauls in Test cricket, having taken the most of any fast bowler with 9 ten-wicket hauls. Only spin bowlers Muralitharan and Warne have taken more with 22 and 10 respectively.

Rank	Ten-wicket hauls	Player	Matches	Balls	Wickets	Period
1	9	Richard Hadlee	86	21,918	431	1973–1990
2	3	Daniel Vettori	112	28,652	361	1997–2014
3	2	Ajaz Patel†	21	4,582	85	2018-2024
4	1	Jack Cowie	9	2,028	45	1937–1949
4	1	Ewen Chatfield	43	10,360	123	1975–1989
4	1	Gary Troup	15	3,183	39	1976–1986
4	1	Lance Cairns	43	10,628	130	1974–1985
4	1	John Bracewell	41	8,403	102	1980–1990
4	1	Chris Pringle	14	2,985	30	1990–1995
4	1	Chris Cairns	62	11,698	218	1989–2004
4	1	Dion Nash	32	6,196	93	1992–2001
4	1	Chris Martin	71	14,026	233	2000–2013
4	1	Shane Bond	18	3,372	87	2001–2009
4	1	Tim Southee	107	23,490	391	2008–2024
4	1	Trent Boult	78	17,417	317	2011–2022
4	1	Mark Craig	15	3,669	50	2014–2016
4	1	Kyle Jamieson†	19	3,558	80	2020–2024
4	1	Mitchell Santner†	32	5,551	78	2015–2025
Last updated: 3 November 2024

=== Worst figures in an innings ===
The worst figures in a single innings in Test cricket came in the third Test between the West Indies at home to Pakistan in 1958. Pakistan's Khan Mohammad returned figures of 0/259 from his 54 overs in the second innings of the match. The worst figures by a New Zealander is 0/181 that came off the bowling of Matthew Hart in the second test of the West Indies tour of New Zealand in 1995.

Rank	Figures	Player	Overs	Opposition	Venue	Date
1	0/181	Matthew Hart	46	West Indies	Basin Reserve, Wellington, New Zealand	10 February 1995
2	0/179	Murphy Su'a	44	West Indies	Basin Reserve, Wellington, New Zealand	10 February 1995
3	0/159	Alex Moir	35	South Africa	Basin Reserve, Wellington, New Zealand	6 March 1953
4	0/156	Mark Craig	31	Australia	Brisbane Cricket Ground, Brisbane, Australia	5 November 2015
5	0/154	Tim Southee	32	England	Trent Bridge, Nottingham, United Kingdom	10 June 2022
Last updated: 20 June 2020

=== Worst figures in a match ===
The worst figures in a match in Test cricket were taken by South Africa's Imran Tahir in the second Test against Australia at the Adelaide Oval in November 2012. He returned figures of 0/180 from his 23 overs in the first innings and 0/80 off 14 in the third innings for a total of 0/260 from 37 overs. He claimed the record in his final over when two runs came from it – enough for him to pass the previous record of 0/259, set 54 years prior.

The worst figures by a New Zealander is by Matthew Hart in the second test of the West Indies tour of New Zealand in 1995.

Rank	Figures	Player	Overs	Opposition	Venue	Date
1	0/181	Matthew Hart	46	West Indies	Basin Reserve, Wellington, New Zealand	10 February 1995
2	0/179	Murphy Su'a	44	West Indies	Basin Reserve, Wellington, New Zealand	10 February 1995
3	0/170	Doug Bracewell	38	Australia	Brisbane Cricket Ground, Brisbane, Australia	5 November 2015
4	0/159	Alex Moir	35	South Africa	Basin Reserve, Wellington, New Zealand	6 March 1953
4	0/159	Stephen Boock	61	West Indies	Bourda, Georgetown, Guyana	6 April 1985
Last updated:20 June 2020

=== Most wickets in a series ===
England's seventh Test tour of South Africa in 1913–14 saw the record set for the most wickets taken by a bowler in a Test series. English paceman Sydney Barnes played in four of the five matches and achieved a total of 49 wickets to his name.

Rank	Wickets	Player	Matches	Opposition	Series
1	33	Richard Hadlee	3	Australia	New Zealand cricket team in Australia in 1985–86
2	27	Bruce Taylor	4	West Indies	New Zealand cricket team in West Indies in 1971–72
3	23	Richard Hadlee	3	Sri Lanka	New Zealand cricket team in Sri Lanka in 1983–84
4	22	Tony MacGibbon	5	South Africa	New Zealand cricket team in South Africa in 1953–54
4	22	Jack Alabaster	5	South Africa	New Zealand cricket team in South Africa in 1961–62
Last updated: 20 June 2020

=== Hat-trick ===
In cricket, a hat-trick occurs when a bowler takes three wickets with consecutive deliveries. The deliveries may be interrupted by an over bowled by another bowler from the other end of the pitch or the other team's innings, but must be three consecutive deliveries by the individual bowler in the same match. Only wickets attributed to the bowler count towards a hat-trick; run outs do not count. In Test cricket history there have been just 44 hat-tricks, the first achieved by Fred Spofforth for Australia against England in 1879. In 1912, Australian Jimmy Matthews achieved the feat twice in one game against South Africa. The only other players to achieve two hat-tricks are Australia's Hugh Trumble, against England in 1902 and 1904, Pakistan's Wasim Akram, in separate games against Sri Lanka in 1999, and England's Stuart Broad.

No.	Bowler	For	Against	Inn.	Test	Dismissals	Venue	Date	Ref.
1	Peter Petherick	New Zealand	Pakistan	1	1/3	Javed Miandad (c Richard Hadlee); Wasim Raja (c and b); Intikhab Alam (c Geoff Howarth)	(Pakistan) Gaddafi Stadium, Lahore	9 October 1976	
2	James Franklin	New Zealand	Bangladesh	1	1/2	Manjural Islam Rana (c Brendon McCullum); Mohammad Rafique (c Scott Styris); Tapash Baisya (b)	(Bangladesh) Bangabandhu National Stadium, Dhaka	20 October 2004	

== Wicket-keeping records ==
The wicket-keeper is a specialist fielder who stands behind the stumps being guarded by the batsman on strike and is the only member of the fielding side allowed to wear gloves and leg pads.

=== Most career dismissals ===
A wicket-keeper can be credited with the dismissal of a batsman in two ways, caught or stumped. A fair catch is taken when the ball is caught fully within the field of play without it bouncing after the ball has touched the striker's bat or glove holding the bat, while a stumping occurs when the wicket-keeper puts down the wicket while the batsman is out of his ground and not attempting a run. New Zealand's BJ Watling is the highest New Zealander in taking most dismissals in Test cricket as a designated wicket-keeper.

Rank	Dismissals	Player	Matches	Innings	Catches	Stumping	Dis/Inn	Period
1	265	BJ Watling	75	127	257	8	2.086	2009–2021
2	201	Adam Parore	78	121	194	7	1.661	1990–2002
3	179	Brendon McCullum	101	95	168	11	1.884	2004–2016
4	176	Ian Smith	63	109	168	8	1.614	1980–1992
5	122	Tom Blundell†	42	69	106	16	1.768	2017–2025
Last updated: 9 August 2025

=== Most career catches ===
Watling is seventh in taking most catches in Test cricket as a designated wicket-keeper.

Rank	Catches	Player	Matches	Innings	Period
1	257	BJ Watling	75	127	2009–2021
2	194	Adam Parore	78	121	1990–2002
3	168	Brendon McCullum	101	95	2004–2016
3	168	Ian Smith	63	109	1980–1992
5	106	Tom Blundell†	42	69	2017–2025
Last updated: 9 August 2025

=== Most career stumpings ===
Bert Oldfield, Australia's fifth-most capped wicket-keeper, holds the record for the most stumpings in Test cricket with 52. New Zealand wicket-keeper Tom Blundell is equal 26th on 16.

Rank	Stumpings	Player	Matches	Innings	Period
1	16	Tom Blundell†	42	69	2017–2025
2	11	Brendon McCullum	101	95	2004–2016
3	8	Frank Mooney	14	23	1949–1954
3	8	Ian Smith	63	109	1980–1992
3	8	BJ Watling	75	127	2009–2021
Last updated: 1 August 2025

=== Most dismissals in an innings ===
Four wicket-keepers have taken seven dismissals in a single innings in a Test match—Wasim Bari of Pakistan in 1979, Englishman Bob Taylor in 1980, New Zealand's Ian Smith in 1991 and most recently West Indian gloveman Ridley Jacobs against Australia in 2000.

The feat of taking 6 dismissals in an innings has been achieved by 24 wicket-keepers on 32 occasions with Watling being the only New Zealander.

Rank	Dismissals	Player	Opposition	Venue	Date
1	7	Ian Smith	Sri Lanka	Seddon Park, Hamilton, New Zealand	22 February 1991
2	6	BJ Watling	India	Eden Park, Auckland, New Zealand	6 February 2014
2	6	BJ Watling	Sri Lanka	University Oval, Dunedin, New Zealand	10 December 2015
4	5	Roy Harford	India	Basin Reserve, Wellington, New Zealand	29 February 1968
4	5	Ken Wadsworth	Pakistan	Eden Park, Auckland, New Zealand	16 February 1973
4	5	Warren Lees	Sri Lanka	Basin Reserve, Wellington, New Zealand	11 March 1983
4	5	Ian Smith	England	Eden Park, Auckland, New Zealand	10 February 1984
4	5	Ian Smith	Sri Lanka	Eden Park, Auckland, New Zealand	1 March 1991
4	5	Adam Parore	England	Eden Park, Auckland, New Zealand	30 January 1992
4	5	Adam Parore	Sri Lanka	Sinhalese Sports Club Ground, Colombo, Sri Lanka	6 December 1992
4	5	Adam Parore	Zimbabwe	Harare Sports Club, Harare, Zimbabwe	19 September 2000
4	5	Adam Parore	Pakistan	Eden Park, Auckland, New Zealand	8 March 2001
4	5	Brendon McCullum	England	Seddon Park, Hamilton, New Zealand	5 March 2008
4	5	Brendon McCullum	West Indies	McLean Park, Napier, New Zealand	19 December 2008
4	5	Brendon McCullum	Pakistan	McLean Park, Napier, New Zealand	11 December 2009
4	5	Brendon McCullum	England	Headingley, Leeds, England	24 May 2013
4	5	BJ Watling	West Indies	Seddon Park, Hamilton, New Zealand	19 December 2013
4	5	BJ Watling	India	Basin Reserve, Wellington, New Zealand	14 February 2014
4	5	BJ Watling	West Indies	Sabina Park, Kingston, West Indies	8 June 2014
4	5	BJ Watling	Sri Lanka	Basin Reserve, Wellington, New Zealand	3 January 2015
4	5	BJ Watling	Sri Lanka	Basin Reserve, Wellington, New Zealand	15 December 2018
4	5	BJ Watling	Sri Lanka	P. Sara Oval, Colombo, Sri Lanka	22 August 2019
Last updated: 20 June 2020

=== Most dismissals in a match ===
Three wicket-keepers have made 11 dismissals in a Test match, Englishman Jack Russell in 1995, South African AB de Villiers in 2013 and most recently India's Rishabh Pant against Australia in 2018.

The feat of making 10 dismissals in a match has been achieved by 4 wicket-keepers on 4 occasions. The most dismissals made by New Zealand wicket-keeper is nine, once by Brendon McCullum in 2009 and twice by BJ Watling in 2014 and 2015.

Rank	Dismissals	Player	Opposition	Venue	Date
1	9	Brendon McCullum	Pakistan	McLean Park, Napier, New Zealand	11 December 2009
1	9	BJ Watling	India	Eden Park, Auckland, New Zealand	6 February 2014
1	9	BJ Watling	Sri Lanka	University Oval, Dunedin, New Zealand	10 December 2015
4	8	Warren Lees	Sri Lanka	Basin Reserve, Wellington, New Zealand	11 March 1983
4	8	Ian Smith	Sri Lanka	Seddon Park, Hamilton, New Zealand	22 February 1991
4	8	BJ Watling	West Indies	Seddon Park, Hamilton, New Zealand	19 December 2013
4	8	BJ Watling	West Indies	Sabina Park, Kingston, Jamaica	8 June 2014
4	8	BJ Watling	Pakistan	Bay Oval, Tauranga, New Zealand	26 December 2020
4	8	Tom Blundell	England	Edgbaston, Birmingham, England	10 June 2021
Last updated: 13 June 2021

=== Most dismissals in a series ===
Brad Haddin holds the Test cricket record for the most dismissals taken by a wicket-keeper in a series. He took 29 catches during the 2013 Ashes series. New Zealand's record is held by Artie Dick when he made 23 dismissals during the New Zealand cricket team in South Africa in 1961–62.

Rank	Dismissals	Player	Matches	Innings	Opposition	Series
1	23	Artie Dick	5	9	South Africa	New Zealand cricket team in South Africa in 1961–62
2	16	Ian Smith	3	5	Sri Lanka	Sri Lankan cricket team in New Zealand in 1990-91
2	16	Adam Parore	3	5	Pakistan	Pakistani cricket team in New Zealand in 2000–01
2	16	Brendon McCullum	3	6	Pakistan	Pakistan cricket team in New Zealand in 2009–10
5	15	BJ Watling	2	4	India	Indian cricket team in New Zealand in 2013-14
5	15	BJ Watling	2	4	Sri Lanka	Sri Lankan cricket team in New Zealand in 2015-16
Last updated: 20 June 2020

== Fielding records ==
=== Most career catches ===
Caught is one of the nine methods a batsman can be dismissed in cricket. (Note: In 2017, The Laws of Cricket were amended, reducing the methods of dismissals from ten to nine, with handled the ball now covered as part of obstructing the field.) The majority of catches are caught in the slips, located behind the batsman, next to the wicket-keeper, on the off side of the field. Most slip fielders are top order batsmen.

India's Rahul Dravid holds the record for the most catches in Test cricket by a non-wicket-keeper with 210, followed by Mahela Jayawardene of Sri Lanka on 205 and South African Jacques Kallis with 200. Stephen Fleming is the highest ranked New Zealander in seventh, securing 171 catches in his Test career.

Rank	Catches	Player	Matches	Innings	Ct/Inn	Period
1	171	Stephen Fleming	111	199	0.859	1994–2008
2	163	Ross Taylor	112	212	0.768	2007–2022
3	93	Tom Latham†	88	171	0.543	2014–2024
4	90	Kane Williamson†	105	200	0.450	2010–2024
5	86	Tim Southee	107	206	0.417	2008–2024
Last updated: 17 December 2024

=== Most catches in a series ===
The 1920–21 Ashes series, in which Australia whitewashed England 5–0 for the first time, saw the record set for the most catches taken by a non-wicket-keeper in a Test series. Australian all-rounder Jack Gregory took 15 catches in the series as well as 23 wickets. Greg Chappell, a fellow Australian all-rounder, and India's K. L. Rahul are equal second behind Gregory with 14 catches taken during the 1974–75 Ashes series and during the 2018 Indian tour of England respectively. Four players have taken 13 catches in a series on six occasions with both Bob Simpson and Brian Lara having done so twice and Rahul Dravid and Alastair Cook once. Stephen Fleming is the highest ranked New Zealander in this list.

Rank	Catches	Player	Matches	Innings	Opposition	Series
1	10	Stephen Fleming	2	4	Zimbabwe	New Zealand cricket team in Zimbabwe in 1997-98
1	10	Stephen Fleming	4	8	England	New Zealand cricket team in England in 1999
3	9	Bryan Young	3	5	Pakistan	Pakistani cricket team in New Zealand in 1993-94
3	9	Stephen Fleming	3	5	Australia	New Zealand cricket team in Australia in 1997–98
3	9	Stephen Fleming	3	5	West Indies	West Indies cricket team in New Zealand in 2005–06
Last updated: 20 June 2020

== All-round records ==
=== 1000 runs and 100 wickets ===
A total of 71 players have achieved the double of 1000 runs and 100 wickets in their Test career.

Rank	Player	Average Difference	Period	Matches	Runs	Bat Avg	Wickets	Bowl Avg
1	Richard Hadlee	4.86	1973-1990	86	3124	27.16	431	22.29
2	Chris Cairns	4.13	1989-2004	62	3320	33.53	218	29.40
3	Daniel Vettori	-4.00	1997-2014	112	4523	30.15	361	34.15
4	Tim Southee	-11.62	2008-2022	84	1747	16.32	335	27.95
5	John Bracewell	-15.38	1980-1990	41	1001	20.42	102	35.81
Last updated: 19 February 2022

=== 250 runs and 20 wickets in a series ===
A total of 18 players on 24 occasions have achieved the double of 250 runs and 20 wickets in a series.

Player	Matches	Runs	Wickets	Opposition	Series
Richard Hadlee	4	301	21	England	New Zealand in England in 1983
Last updated: 22 August 2020

== Other records ==
=== Most career matches ===
India's Sachin Tendulkar holds the record for the most Test matches played with 200, with former captains Ricky Ponting and Steve Waugh being joint second with each having represented Australia on 168 occasions. Daniel Vettori and Ross Taylor are the highest ranked New Zealanders in this list.

Rank	Matches	Player	Runs	Wkts	Period
1	112	Ross Taylor	7,683	3	2007–2022
1	112	Daniel Vettori	4,523	361	1997–2014
3	111	Stephen Fleming	7,172	-	1994–2008
4	107	Tim Southee	2,245	391	2008–2024
5	105	Kane Williamson†	9,276	30	2010–2024
Last updated: 27 October 2024

=== Most consecutive career matches ===
Former English captain Alastair Cook holds the record for the most consecutive Test matches played with 159. He broke Allan Border's long standing record of 153 matches in June 2018. The recently retired New Zealand wicket-keeper-batsman Brendon McCullum, who is fifth on the list with 101 matches, is the highest ranked cricketer who never missed a Test match during his playing career.

Rank	Matches	Player	Period
1	101	Brendon McCullum	2004–2016
2	88	Tom Latham†	2014–2024
3	72	Stephen Fleming	1999–2008
4	58	John R. Reid	1949–1965
5	51	Adam Parore	1996–2002
Last updated: 14 December 2024

=== Most matches as captain ===
Graeme Smith, who led the South African cricket team from 2003 to 2014, holds the record for the most matches played as captain in Test cricket with 109.Stephen Fleming who led the side for nine years from 1997 to 2006 is third on the list with 80 matches.

Rank	Matches	Player	Won	Lost	Tied	Draw	%W	%L	Period
1	80	Stephen Fleming	28	27	0	25	35	33.75	1997–2006
2	40	Kane Williamson	22	10	0	8	55	25	2016-2022
3	34	John R. Reid	3	18	0	13	8.82	52.94	1956–1965
4	32	Daniel Vettori	6	16	0	10	18.75	50	2007–2011
5	31	Brendon McCullum	11	11	0	9	35.48	35.48	2013-2016
Last updated: 28 December 2022

=== Most matches won as a captain ===
Rank	Won	Player	Matches	Lost	Tied	Draw	%W	%L	Period
1	28	Stephen Fleming	80	27	0	25	35	33.75	1997–2006
2	22	Kane Williamson	40	10	0	8	55	25	2016-2022
3	11	Geoff Howarth	30	7	0	12	36.66	23.33	1980–1985
3	11	Brendon McCullum	31	11	0	9	35.48	35.48	2013-2016
5	6	Daniel Vettori	32	16	0	10	18.75	50	2007–2011
Last updated: 28 December 2022

=== Most man of the match awards ===
Rank	M.O.M. Awards	Player	Matches	Period
1	11	Kane Williamson†	94	2010–2023
1	11	Daniel Vettori	112	1997–2014
3	9	Richard Hadlee	86	1973–1990
4	8	Ross Taylor	112	2007–2022
5	7	John Wright	82	1978–1993
5	7	Stephen Fleming	111	1994–2008
Last updated: 13 March 2023

=== Most man of the series awards ===
Rank	M.O.S. Awards	Player	Matches	Period
1	8	Richard Hadlee	86	1973–1990
2	4	Kane Willaimson†	102	2010–2024
3	3	Daniel Vettori	112	1997–2014
4	2	Shane Bond	18	2001–2009
4	2	Devon Conway†	24	2021–2024
4	2	Matt Henry†	26	2015–2024
4	2	Neil Wagner	64	2012–2024
4	2	Trent Boult†	78	2011–2022
4	2	Tim Southee	104	2008–2024
Last updated: 27 October 2024

=== Youngest players on debut ===
The youngest player to play in a Test match is claimed to be Hasan Raza at the age of 14 years and 227 days. Making his debut for Pakistan against Zimbabwe on 24 October 1996, there is some doubt as to the validity of Raza's age at the time. The youngest New Zealander to play Test cricket was Daniel Vettori who at the age of 18 years and 10 days debuted in the second Test of the series against England in February 1997.

Rank	Age	Player	Opposition	Venue	Date
1	18 years and 10 days	Daniel Vettori	England	Basin Reserve, Wellington, New Zealand	6 February 1997
2	18 years and 197 days	Doug Freeman	England	Lancaster Park, Christchurch, New Zealand	24 March 1933
3	18 years and 267 days	Giff Vivian	England	The Oval, London, England	29 July 1931
4	18 years and 295 days	Richard Collinge	Pakistan	Basin Reserve, Wellington, New Zealand	22 January 1965
5	18 years and 316 days	Brendon Bracewell	England	The Oval, London, England	27 July 1978
Last updated: 3 December 2017

=== Oldest players on debut ===
England left-arm slow bowler James Southerton is the oldest player to appear in a Test match. Playing in the very first inaugural test against Australia in 1876 at Melbourne Cricket Ground, in Melbourne, Australia, he was aged 49 years and 119 days. Herb McGirr is the oldest New Zealand Test debutant when he made his debut during the 1930 England series at the Eden Park.

Rank	Age	Player	Opposition	Venue	Date
1	38 years and 101 days	Herb McGirr	England	Eden Park, Auckland, New Zealand	14 February 1930
2	36 years and 317 days	Ray Emery	West Indies	Lancaster Park, Christchurch, New Zealand	8 February 1952
3	36 years and 120 days	Tom Puna	England	Lancaster Park, Christchurch, New Zealand	25 February 1966
4	36 years and 89 days	Allen Lissette	West Indies	Carisbrook, Dunedin, New Zealand	3 February 1956
5	34 years and 295 days	Graham Gedye	South Africa	Basin Reserve, Wellington, New Zealand	21 February 1964
Last updated: 20 June 2020

=== Oldest players ===
England all-rounder Wilfred Rhodes is the oldest player to appear in a Test match. Playing in the fourth Test against the West Indies in 1930 at Sabina Park, in Kingston, Jamaica, he was aged 52 years and 165 days on the final day's play. The oldest New Zealand Test player is Jack Alabaster who was aged 41 years and 242 days when he represented New Zealand for the final time in the 1972 tour of West Indies at the Queen's Park Oval.

Rank	Age	Player	Opposition	Venue	Date
1	41 years and 242 days	Jack Alabaster	West Indies	Queen's Park Oval, Port of Spain, Trinidad	9 March 1972
2	41 years and 191 days	Bert Sutcliffe	England	Edgbaston, Birmingham, England	27 May 1965
3	40 years and 194 days	Bevan Congdon	England	Lord's, London, England	24 August 1978
4	39 years and 240 days	Alex Moir	England	Eden Park, Auckland, New Zealand	14 March 1959
5	39 years and 2 days	Richard Hadlee	England	Edgbaston, Birmingham, England	5 July 1990
Last updated: 28 January 2021

== Umpiring records ==
=== Most matches umpired ===
An umpire in cricket is a person who officiates the match according to the Laws of Cricket. Two umpires adjudicate the match on the field, whilst a third umpire has access to video replays, and a fourth umpire looks after the match balls and other duties. The records below are only for on-field umpires.

Aleem Dar of Pakistan holds the record for the most Test matches umpired with 130. The current active Dar set the record in December 2019 overtaking Steve Bucknor from the West Indies mark of 128 matches. They are followed by South Africa's Rudi Koertzen who officiated in 108.

Rank	Matches	Umpire	Period
1	84	Billy Bowden	2000-2015
2	40	Tony Hill	2001–2013
2	40	Chris Gaffaney†	2014–2022
4	39	Steve Dunne	1989–2002
5	26	Brian Aldridge	1986–1995
Last updated: 19 February 2022

== See also ==
- Cricket statistics
- List of New Zealand One Day International cricket records
- List of New Zealand Twenty20 International cricket records
- List of Test cricket records
- Portal:Cricket
