= New Zealand cricket team in Sri Lanka in 1992–93 =

International cricket tour

| | Sri Lanka | New Zealand |
- Dates: 27 November 1992 – 2 December 1992
| Captains | Arjuna Ranatunga | Martin Crowe |

Test series
- Result: Sri Lanka won the 2-match series 1–0
| Most runs | Roshan Mahanama (291) | Ken Rutherford (196) |
| Most wickets | Jayananda Warnaweera (9) | Michael Owens (7) |
- Player of the series: Roshan Mahanama (SL)

One Day International series
- Results: Sri Lanka won the 3-match series 2–0
| Most runs | Roshan Mahanama (202) | Chris Harris (cricketer) (102) |
| Most wickets | Ruwan Kalpage (8) | Chris Pringle (5) |
- Player of the series: Roshan Mahanama (SL)

The New Zealand national cricket team's tour of Sri Lanka in 1992–93 was the second Test cricket series played in Sri Lanka since the previous New Zealand tour of the country had been cut short following the Colombo central bus station bombing in 1987. (Note: Australia had toured Sri Lanka between August and September 1992 in the first Test tour of the country since the 1987 attacks.) The tour was almost called off before it had started following a suicide bomb attack which saw the assassination of Vice-Admiral Clancy Fernando and three other naval officers by Tamil separatists. The assassination took place only 50 metres from the team's hotel in Colombo and led to several players returning home.

The tour took place in November and December 1992. New Zealand had toured Zimbabwe immediately before flying to Sri Lanka to play three Test matches and three One Day Internationals (ODIs), a series of matches which Wisden described as being intended as "a confidence-boosting exercise to develop some of New Zealand's emerging players". Following the suicide bombing one Test match was cancelled and a number of replacement players joined the tour party. Sri Lanka won the Test series 1–0, with one match drawn, and the ODI series 2–0, with the first ODI ending without a result following heavy rain.

== Tour party ==
A fifteen-man squad had been announced on 4 September for both the tour of Zimbabwe and the subsequent tour of Sri Lanka, with the team's established wicket-keeper Ian Smith having retired following the 1992 Cricket World Cup. Before the tour of Zimbabwe began two players, Chris Cairns and Danny Morrison, were replaced due to injuries, with Simon Doull and Mark Haslam called into the team. Doull was injured during the tour of Zimbabwe and was replaced by Chris Pringle for the Sri Lankan leg of the tour. The team was captained by Martin Crowe, with Andrew Jones as vice-captain. The tour manager was Leif Dearsley.

The tour party was initially made up of:

- Martin Crowe (captain)
- Andrew Jones (vice-captain)
- Mark Greatbatch
- Chris Harris
- Blair Hartland
- Mark Haslam
- Gavin Larsen
- Rod Latham
- Dion Nash
- Adam Parore
- Dipak Patel
- Chris Pringle
- Ken Rutherford
- Murphy Su'a
- Willie Watson

Following the bombing in Colombo, which occurred close to the New Zealand team's hotel, the team considered abandoning the tour. A vote initially split the players and Peter McDermott, the chairman of the New Zealand Cricket Board, flew to the country to negotiate with them. Wisden reported that McDermott was concerned about compensation that would need to be paid to the Sri Lankan Cricket Board if the tour was cancelled and was under pressure from the New Zealand government which wasiaming to improve trade-relations with Sri Lanka. He convinced enough players to continue the tour, although Crowe was critical of the decision and considered that he had been directed to continue as captain against his wishes.

Five players, Greatbatch, Larsen, Latham, Patel and Watson, chose to leave the tour and return to New Zealand, as did the team coach Warren Lees. They were replaced by Grant Bradburn, Michael Owens, Justin Vaughan and veteran batsman John Wright, who had previously made himself unavailable for the tour. Crowe took over as the main coach for the team. Owens and Vaughan were the only uncapped players on the tour; both made their international debut in the first Test match. (Note: Harris, who also made his Test match debut in the same match, had previously played ODI cricket.)

Sri Lanka were captained by Arjuna Ranatunga throughout the tour.

== Tour itinerary ==
The tour was originally scheduled to include three Test matches, with matches due to be played at Kandy from 21 to 26 November, Moratuwa from 5 to 10 December and at Colombo from 12 to 17 December. Following the suicide bombing in Colombo this was reduced to two Tests, with no match played at Kandy and the dates of the other matches on the tour changed. A three-day warm up match which was scheduled to start on 17 November, the day after the bombing, was cancelled and replaced by two one-day matches against a Sri Lankan Cricket Board XI.

The New Zealand team flew from Zimbabwe to Singapore before transferring to Sri Lanka.

== Test series ==
The revised two-match Test series was won 1–0 by Sri Lanka, with the first Test drawn.

=== First Test ===
27 November–1 December 1992
Scorecard
Wisden report

| New Zealand | v | Sri Lanka |
| 288 (133.5 overs); KR Rutherford 105 (227 balls); DK Liyanage 4/82 (26.5 overs) | | 327/6d (92 overs); RS Mahanama 153 (297 balls); ML Su'a 2/62 (25 overs) |
| 195/5 (103 overs); KR Rutherford 53 (62 balls); CPH Ramanayake 2/27 (17 overs) |

Drawn
Tyronne Fernando Stadium, Moratuwa
Umpires: KT Francis and TM Samarasinghe
Player of the match: RS Mahanama (Sri Lanka)

- Sri Lanka won the toss and chose to field
- Rain on the fifth day restricted play in New Zealand's second innings
- 30 November was a rest day
  CZ Harris, MB Owens and JTC Vaughan (all New Zealand) made their Test match debut

=== Second Test ===
6–8 December 1992
Scorecard
Wisden report

| Sri Lanka | v | New Zealand |
| 394 (128.3 overs); RS Mahanama 109 (154 balls); MB Owens 4/101 (30 overs) | | 102 (52.1 overs); JG Wright 30 (70 balls); KPJ Warnaweera 4/25 (14 overs) |
| 73/1 (14.4 overs); RS Mahanama 29 (27 balls); MB Owens 1/36 (6 overs) | | 361 (f/o) (119 overs); MD Crowe 107 (121 balls); M Muralitharan 4/134 (40 overs) |

Sri Lanka won by 9 wickets
Sinhalese Sports Club Ground, Colombo
Umpires: I Anandappa and TM Samarasinghe
Player of the match: HP Tillakaratne (Sri Lanka)

- Sri Lanka won the toss and chose to bat
- The match was scheduled for five days but completed in four

== One Day International series ==
Sri Lanka won the series 2–0 with one match ending as no-result.

=== 1st ODI ===
4 December 1992 (D/N)
Scorecard
Wisden report

| New Zealand; 166/5 (50 overs) | v | Sri Lanka; 41/2 (10.2 overs) |
| KR Rutherford 36 (69 balls); RS Kalpage 3/29 (10 overs) | | PA de Silva 13* (12 balls); C Pringle 2/15 (5.2 overs) |

No result
Khettarama Stadium, Colombo
Umpires: KT Francis and PT Manuel

- Sri Lanka won the toss and chose to field
- Following heavy rain Sri Lanka's target was reduced to 67 runs in 20 overs. The match was abandoned after 10.2 overs of the Sri Lankan innings due to a wet outfield
- JTC Vaughan (New Zealand), DK Liyanage and AGD Wickremasinghe (both Sri Lanka) made their ODI debut

=== 2nd ODI ===
12 December 1992
Scorecard
Wisden report

| New Zealand; 190/7 (50 overs) | v | Sri Lanka; 192/2 (37.4 overs) |
| BR Hartland 54 (108 balls); ST Jayasuriya 3/33 (8 overs) | | RS Mahanama 84* (109 balls); ML Su'a 1/28 (5 overs) |

Sri Lanka won by 8 wickets
Paikiasothy Saravanamuttu Stadium, Colombo
Umpires: I Anandappa and SG Ponnadurai
Player of the match: RS Mahanama (Sri Lanka)

- Sri Lanka won the toss and chose to field

=== 3rd ODI ===
13 December 1992 (D/N)
Scorecard
Wisden report

| Sri Lanka; 262/6 (49 overs) | v | New Zealand; 231 (48.5 overs) |
| RS Mahanama 107 (132 balls); C Pringle 3/59 (8 overs) | | CZ Harris 68* (68 balls); RS Kalpage 3/46 (10 overs) |

Sri Lanka won by 31 runs
Khettarama Stadium, Colombo
Umpires: KT Francis and PT Manuel
Player of the match: RS Mahanama (Sri Lanka)

- New Zealand won the toss and chose to field
- The match was reduced from 50 overs to 49 overs per side
- MJ Haslam and MB Owens (both New Zealand) made their ODI debut
