= Blair Hartland =

New Zealand cricketer

Personal information
- Full name: Blair Robert Hartland
- Born: 22 October 1966 (age 60); Christchurch, Canterbury, New Zealand
- Batting: Right-handed

International information
- National side: New Zealand (1992–1994)
- Test debut (cap 175): 18 January 1992 v England
- Last Test: 2 June 1994 v England
- ODI debut (cap 81): 9 November 1992 v Zimbabwe
- Last ODI: 19 December 1994 v Pakistan

Career statistics
Competition	Test	ODI	FC	LA
Matches	9	16	83	68
Runs scored	303	311	3,753	1,705
Batting average	16.83	20.73	26.42	26.23
100s/50s	0/1	0/2	5/19	2/9
Top score	52	68*	150	161
Balls bowled	0	0	0	18
Wickets	–	–	–	1
Bowling average	–	–	–	22.00
5 wickets in innings	–	–	–	0
10 wickets in match	–	–	–	0
Best bowling	–	–	–	1/14
Catches/stumpings	5/–	5/–	52/–	19/1
- Source: Cricinfo, 2 May 2017

Blair Robert Hartland (born 22 October 1966) is a former New Zealand cricketer who played nine Tests and 16 One Day Internationals for New Zealand. He was a specialist batsman, who usually opened the innings and bowled a total of three overs in his senior career. The son of former Canterbury cricketer, Ian Hartland, he was also a very talented hockey player.

== School times ==
Attending Christchurch Boys' High School, Hartland was marked out as a talent early on, and aged 19 he was picked for the New Zealand Young Cricketers, who toured Australia in 1985–86.

== Personal life ==
Hartland is married to Nicki and has three children: Emma born 1995 (age 30–31), Tessa born 1997 (age 28–29), and Benjamin born 1999 (age 26–27).

== Domestic career ==
The following season he made his first class debut, playing one game for Canterbury in a drawn domestic game. He made 59 runs for once out, retiring injured in the second innings, and did not return in that season. He also played two seasons of second XI cricket for Northamptonshire in 1987 and 1988, and in 1988–89 Hartland hit his maiden first class century, in his fourteenth match.

Hartland became a regular fixture in the Canterbury first-class team after that, playing 10 of 11 games in the 1990–91 season, for example. The following season, he was picked as an opening batsman for New Zealand Emerging Players (similar to the current New Zealand A team) against a touring England XI.

He played 11 seasons of domestic cricket for Canterbury, playing 83 first class and 68 List A games in total, Hartland also held the record for the most runs in a one-day domestic match, until it was broken by Brendon McCullum.

== International career ==
When the English cricket team visited New Zealand in 1991, Hartland opened for the New Zealand Emerging Players team; though he faced 36 balls in his two innings he only made one run for twice out, but that didn't prevent the New Zealand selectors from selecting him for the first Test at his native Christchurch two weeks later, as New Zealand sought a replacement for the defensive opener Trevor Franklin who had opened on tour of Sri Lanka a year earlier.

However, Hartland's debut did not yield a good result for New Zealand. England were put in to bat, made 580 for nine declared, before spin bowler Phil Tufnell took eleven wickets in the match, including Hartland twice, for 22 in the first innings and then 45 in the second when stumps were drawn on day four. Hartland watched as Tufnell added a further six victims in the second innings, and England secured a victory by an innings and four runs. Hartland was retained for the second Test, however, and recorded a pair of ducks as New Zealand went down by 168 runs – before scoring 2 in New Zealand's first innings of the third Test where the team made 432 for 9 declared after a stand of 241 between John Wright and Andrew Jones.

Hartland had still not passed fifty in six Test innings, but was still taken on tours of Zimbabwe and Sri Lanka in 1992–93, and though he did not play a Test against Zimbabwe (with Mark Greatbatch and Rod Latham preferred as openers), he played his first ODI on that tour, scoring five runs from number three in the batting order as New Zealand won by four wickets. Greatbatch and Latham were dropped for Sri Lanka, however, and Hartland was back as opener together with Wright; after he was out to Dulip Liyanage for 3 in the first innings, and Sri Lanka had declared 39 runs ahead with five sessions remaining, Hartland batted for four hours in an opening stand worth 110 with Wright, making his maiden Test fifty. New Zealand batted out the match, making 195 for 5 in the second innings to draw the game.

That was enough for Hartland to be picked for the second Test a week later, where he made the second highest score of New Zealand's innings. However, that was only 21, as New Zealand fell from 57 for 0 to 102 all out; following on, Hartland made 21 again as New Zealand made 361, but Sri Lanka took a nine-wicket win and the series by 1–0. Hartland also played two of the three ODIs in the series, recording his maiden ODI fifty, but New Zealand still lost both matches and the series 0–2.

Hartland also played New Zealand's next Test, a home match against Pakistan, but after he once again failed to pass 50 and made 9 in a second-innings chase of 127 to win, where New Zealand were bowled out for 93 by Wasim Akram (five for 45) and Waqar Younis (five for 22) he was dropped and did not play international matches for over a year. When he did return, it was once again against Pakistan, scoring 13 runs in two innings in a five-wicket win for New Zealand. He continued to feature in the New Zealand side for the remainder of the 1993–94 season, making 68 not out in a successful chase of 146 in a One Day International against Pakistan, but otherwise not passing 25 in one Test and seven One Day Internationals.

Hartland was, however, picked for New Zealand's tour of England in 1994; he played nine matches against first-class sides of the country, but only one Test, his last. Hartland made 6 and 22 in an innings defeat, and was replaced by Blair Pocock in the next match. He played a further five ODIs during the 1994–95 season, but after five scores below 50 he was dropped after the Mandela Trophy. He played a further two seasons for Canterbury before retiring.
