= English cricket team in New Zealand in 1991–92 =

International cricket tour

The England national cricket team toured New Zealand in January to mid-February 1992 and played a three-match Test series against the New Zealand national cricket team. England won the series 2–0 with one match drawn. The concurrent three-match ODI series was won 3-0 by England. The tour immediately preceded the 1992 World Cup held in Australia and New Zealand where New Zealand did surprisingly well due to a series of innovations under captain Martin Crowe.

== Test series summary ==
=== 1st Test ===
18–22 January 1992
(5-day match)
Scorecard

England	v	New Zealand
580/9d (163 overs); AJ Stewart 148 (265); C Pringle 3/127 (36 overs)		312 (127.4 overs); DN Patel 99 (134); PCR Tufnell 4/100 (39 overs)
		264 (f/o) (132.1 overs); JG Wright 99 (323); PCR Tufnell 7/47 (46.1 overs)

England won by an innings and 4 runs
Lancaster Park, Christchurch
Umpires: BL Aldridge and RS Dunne
Player of the match: PCR Tufnell (ENG)

- New Zealand won the toss and elected to field.
- BR Hartland (NZ) and DA Reeve (ENG) made their Test debuts.

=== 2nd Test ===
30 January–3 February 1992
(5-day match)
Scorecard

England	v	New Zealand
203 (83 overs); DR Pringle 41 (93); CL Cairns 6/52 (21 overs)		142 (63 overs); MD Crowe 45 (113); CC Lewis 5/31 (21 overs)
321 (93.4 overs); GA Gooch 114 (220); ML Su'a 2/43 (10 overs)		214 (79 overs); MD Crowe 56 (110); PAJ De Freitas 4/62 (27 overs)

England won by 168 runs
Eden Park, Auckland
Umpires: BL Aldridge and RS Dunne
Player of the match: GA Gooch (ENG)

- New Zealand won the toss and elected to field.
- ML Su'a (NZ) made his Test debut.

=== 3rd Test ===
6–10 February 1992
(5-day match)
Scorecard

England	v	New Zealand
305 (118.1 overs); AJ Stewart 107 (241); DN Patel 4/87 (34 overs)		432/9d (192 overs); AH Jones 143 (398); GA Hick 4/126 (69 overs)
359/7d (119.3 overs); AJ Lamb 142 (230); ML Su'a 3/87 (33 overs)		43/3 (24 overs); BR Hartland 19 (36); IT Botham 2/23 (8 overs)

Match drawn
Basin Reserve, Wellington
Umpires: BL Aldridge and RS Dunne
Player of the match: AJ Stewart (ENG)

- England won the toss and elected to bat.
- RT Latham (NZ) made his Test debut.
- Ian Botham became the first player to dismiss a father-son duo in Test cricket when he dismissed Chris Cairns in the first innings, having previously dismissed Lance Cairns.

== One Day Internationals (ODIs) ==
England won the Bank of New Zealand Trophy 3-0.

=== 1st ODI ===
11 January 1992
Scorecard

New Zealand; 178/7 (50 overs)	v	England; 179/3 (33.5 overs)
CL Cairns 42 (59); DA Reeve 3/20 (10 overs)		RA Smith 61* (71); CZ Harris 2/40 (8 overs)

England won by 7 wickets
Eden Park, Auckland
Umpires: DB Cowie and SJ Woodward
Player of the match: DA Reeve (ENG)

- New Zealand won the toss and elected to bat.

=== 2nd ODI ===
12 February 1992
Scorecard

New Zealand; 186/7 (50 overs)	v	England; 188/7 (49.1 overs)
KR Rutherford 52 (86); DA Reeve 1/19 (10 overs)		AJ Lamb 40 (61); RT Latham 3/25 (8 overs)

England won by 3 wickets
Carisbrook, Dunedin
Umpires: BL Aldridge and RS Dunne
Player of the match: KR Rutherford (NZ)

- New Zealand won the toss and elected to bat.
- ML Su'a (NZ) made his ODI debut.

=== 3rd ODI ===
15 February 1992
Scorecard

England; 255/7 (40 overs)	v	New Zealand; 184/8 (40 overs)
RA Smith 85 (71); CL Cairns 2/37 (6 overs)		KR Rutherford 37 (49); CZ Harris 37 (62); DR Pringle 2/11 (6 overs)

England won by 71 runs
Lancaster Park, Christchurch
Umpires: RL McHarg and SJ Woodward
Player of the match: IT Botham (ENG)

- New Zealand won the toss and elected to field.
- The match was reduced before play started from 50 to 40 overs per side.
