= West Indian cricket team in New Zealand in 1994–95 =

International cricket tour

	New Zealand	West Indies
- Dates: 15 January – 13 February 1995
Captains	Ken Rutherford	Courtney Walsh

Test series
- Result: West Indies won the 2-match series 1–0
Most runs	Darrin Murray (146)	Jimmy Adams (164)
Most wickets	Danny Morrison (8)	Courtney Walsh (16)

One Day International series
- Results: West Indies won the 3-match series 3–0
Most runs	Bryan Young (94)	Brian Lara (161)
Most wickets	Danny Morrison (2); Gavin Larsen (2)	Keith Arthurton (7)

The West Indies cricket team toured New Zealand in January to February 1995 and played a two-match Test series against the New Zealand national cricket team which they won 1–0. New Zealand were captained by Ken Rutherford and the West Indies by Courtney Walsh. In addition, the teams played a three-match series of One Day Internationals (ODI) which West Indies won 3–0.

== Tour matches ==
=== 50-over: West Indians v Sir Ron Brierly's XI ===
15 January 1995
Scorecard

West Indians; 273/3 (50 overs)	v	Sir Ron Brierly's XI; 232/6 (50 overs)
Stuart Williams 121 (144); Paul Jarvis 2/57 (9 overs)		Nathan Astle 59* (40); Rajindra Dhanraj 3/35 (10 overs)

West Indians won by 41 runs
WestpacTrust Park, Hamilton
Umpires: Tony Hill and Thomas McCall

- West Indians won the toss and elected to bat.

In their first tour match, the West Indians played against a side that comprised retired players such as Australia's paceman Jeff Thomson, New Zealand captain and batsman John Wright and all-rounder Lance Cairns. A report said that it was "...mainly intended as a fun match." Sir Ron Brierly's XI also included young players such as spinner Dipak Patel. Upon opting to bat first after winning the toss, Stuart Williams and Sherwin Campbell put on a 237-run stand for the first wicket for the West Indians, with both making centuries. Chasing 273, the home team fell 41 runs short, despite being "... offered some generous bowling which gave the batsmen opportunities to make big hits."

=== 50:over: West Indians v Auckland ===
17 January 1995
Scorecrd

West Indians; 206/9 (50 overs)	v	Auckland; 101 (35.2 overs)
Winston Benjamin 74 (60); Danny Morrison 2/33 (10 overs)		Justin Vaughan 33 (75); Winston Benjamin 4/10 (8 overs)

West Indians won by 105 runs
Eden Park, Auckland
Umpires: Billy Bowden and Doug Cowie

- West Indians won the toss and elected to bat.
- Steve Brown and Scott Francis (both Auckland) played their last List A match.

== Test series summary ==
=== First Test ===
3–7 February 1995
(5-day match)
Scorecard

New Zealand	v	West Indies
341/8d (124.1 overs); AC Parore 100* (249); CEL Ambrose 3/57 (31.1 overs)		312 (96.2 overs); WKM Benjamin 85 (87); DK Morrison 6/69 (26.2 overs)
61/2 (32 overs); BA Young 21 (49); CA Walsh 1/8 (4 overs)

Match drawn
Lancaster Park, Christchurch
Umpires: BL Aldridge (NZ) and NT Plews (ENG)
Player of the match: AC Parore (NZ)

- West Indies won the toss and elected to field.
- There was no play on the third day.
- SL Campbell (WI) made his Test debut.

=== Second Test ===
10–13 February 1995
(5-day match)
Scorecard

West Indies	v	New Zealand
660/5d (169.2 overs); JC Adams 151 (226); DK Morrison 2/82 (29 overs)		216 (84.4 overs); DJ Murray 52 (187); CA Walsh 7/37 (20.4 overs)
		122 (f/o) (40.2 overs); DJ Murray 43 (81); CA Walsh 6/18 (15.2 overs)

West Indies won by an innings and 322 runs
Basin Reserve, Wellington
Umpires: RS Dunne (NZ) and VK Ramaswamy (IND)
Player of the match: CA Walsh (WI)

- West Indies won the toss and elected to bat.
- The match was scheduled for five days but completed in four.
- The West Indies score of 660 is the highest total conceded by New Zealand in Test matches.

== One Day Internationals (ODIs) ==
=== 1st ODI ===
22 January 1995
Scorecard

New Zealand; 167/6 (37 overs)	v	West Indies; 149/1 (27.4 overs)
BA Young 42 (73); KLT Arthurton 2/25 (4 overs)		SC Williams 73* (80); GR Larsen 1/35 (7 overs)

West Indies won on faster scoring rate
Eden Park, Auckland
Umpires: BL Aldridge and DB Cowie
Player of the match: BC Lara (WI)

- New Zealand won the toss and elected to bat.
- The match was reduced to 37 overs per side.
- When play was halted West Indies needed to have scored 125 runs to win.
- NJ Astle (NZ) made his ODI debut.

=== 2nd ODI ===
25 January 1995
Scorecard

West Indies; 246/7 (50 overs)	v	New Zealand; 205 (48.5 overs)
BC Lara 72 (85); DK Morrison 2/32 (8 overs)		BA Young 39 (43); R Dhanraj 2/31 (10 overs)

West Indies won by 41 runs
Basin Reserve, Wellington
Umpires: RS Dunne and CE King
Player of the match: BC Lara (WI)

- New Zealand won the toss and elected to field.

=== 3rd ODI ===
28 January 1995
Scorecard

New Zealand; 146 (49 overs)	v	West Indies; 149/1 (37.4 overs)
KR Rutherford 30 (54); WKM Benjamin 3/12 (8 overs)		SC Williams 69* (107); GR Larsen 1/39 (10 overs)

West Indies won by 9 wickets
Lancaster Park, Christchurch
Umpires: CE King and DM Quested
Player of the match: WKM Benjamin (WI)

- West Indies won the toss and elected to field.
- RL Hayes (NZ) made his ODI debut.
