= New Zealand cricket team in Zimbabwe in 1997–98 =

International cricket tour

	Zimbabwe	New Zealand
- Dates: 18 September 1997 – 5 October 1997
Captains	Alistair Campbell	Stephen Fleming

Test series
- Result: 2-match series drawn 0–0
Most runs	Grant Flower (387)	Stephen Fleming (181)
Most wickets	Adam Huckle (16)	Chris Cairns (9)
- Player of the series: Grant Flower (Zim)

One Day International series
- Results: 3-match series drawn 1–1
Most runs	Gavin Rennie (95)	Chris Harris (124)
Most wickets	John Rennie (5)	Nathan Astle (4); Gavin Larsen (4); Daniel Vettori (4)
- Player of the series: Chris Harris (NZ)

The New Zealand cricket team toured Zimbabwe for a two-match Test series and a three-match One Day International (ODI) series between 18 September and 5 October 1997. The Test series was drawn 0–0 and the ODI series was drawn 1–1. Several months later Zimbabwe made a reciprocal tour of New Zealand in 1998.

== Test series ==
=== 1st Test ===
18–22 September 1997
Scorecard

Zimbabwe	v	New Zealand
298 (114.1 overs); Grant Flower 104 (288); Chris Cairns 5/50 (28.1 overs)		207 (84 overs); Stephen Fleming 52 (113); Bryan Strang 3/29 (19 overs)
311/9 dec (91.5 overs); Grant Flower 151 (240); Shayne O'Connor 3/73 (26 overs)		304/8 (128 overs); Chris Cairns 71* (238); Adam Huckle 3/84 (31 overs)

Match drawn
Harare Sports Club, Harare
Umpires: B. C. Cooray (Sri) and Ian Robinson (Zim)
Player of the match: Grant Flower (Zim)

- New Zealand won the toss and elected to field.

=== 2nd Test ===
25–29 September 1997
Scorecard

Zimbabwe	v	New Zealand
461 (161 overs); Guy Whittall 203* (359); Daniel Vettori 4/165 (58 overs)		403 (161.4 overs); Nathan Astle 96 (176); Adam Huckle 6/109 (40.4 overs)
227/8 dec (64 overs); Alistair Campbell 59* (121); Daniel Vettori 2/69 (18 overs)		275/8 (68 overs); Stephen Fleming 75 (103); Adam Huckle 5/146 (32 overs)

Match drawn
Queens Sports Club, Bulawayo
Umpires: Srinivas Venkataraghavan (Ind) and Russell Tiffin (Zim)
Player of the match: Guy Whittall (Zim)

- Zimbabwe won the toss and elected to bat.

== ODI series ==
=== 1st ODI ===
1 October 1997
Scorecard

Zimbabwe; 233/8 (50 overs)	v	New Zealand; 233/9 (50 overs)
Grant Flower 66 (95); Shayne O'Connor 2/28 (8 overs)		Chris Harris 77* (102); John Rennie 2/47 (10 overs)

Match tied
Queens Sports Club, Bulawayo
Umpires: Quintin Goosen (Zim) and Russell Tiffin (Zim)
Player of the match: Chris Harris (NZ)

- Zimbabwe won the toss and elected to bat.

=== 2nd ODI ===
4 October 1997
Scorecard

New Zealand; 185/7 (50 overs)	v	Zimbabwe; 188/7 (48.2 overs)
Craig McMillan 38 (84); Craig Evans 2/27 (10 overs)		Alistair Campbell 77* (114); Craig McMillan 2/17 (4 overs)

Zimbabwe won by 3 wickets
Harare Sports Club, Harare
Umpires: Graeme Evans (Zim) and Ian Robinson (Zim)
Player of the match: Paul Strang (Zim)

- New Zealand won the toss and elected to bat.

=== 3rd ODI ===
5 October 1997
Scorecard

New Zealand; 294/7 (50 overs)	v	Zimbabwe; 211 (44.1 overs)
Chris Cairns 71 (78); Bryan Strang 3/66 (10 overs)		Guy Whittall 49 (45); Daniel Vettori 3/41 (7.1 overs)

New Zealand won by 83 runs
Harare Sports Club, Harare
Umpires: Russell Tiffin (Zim) and Ian Robinson (Zim)
Player of the match: Chris Cairns (NZ)

- New Zealand won the toss and elected to bat.
