= New Zealand cricket team in Sri Lanka in 1983–84 =

International cricket tour

	Sri Lanka	New Zealand

Test series
- Result: New Zealand won the 3-match series 2–0
Most runs	Ranjan Madugalle (242)	John Reid (243)
Most wickets	Ravi Ratnayeke (8)	Richard Hadlee (23)

The New Zealand national cricket team visited Sri Lanka for the first time in 1983-84 and played 3 Tests. New Zealand won the series 2-0 with 1 match drawn:

== Test series ==
=== 1st Test ===
9–14 March 1984
Scorecard

New Zealand	v	Sri Lanka
276 (100.1 overs); Geoff Howarth 62 (131); Vinothen John 5/86 (29.1 overs)		215 (79.5 overs); Jayantha Amerasinghe 34 (43); Richard Hadlee 4/35 (20.5 overs)
201/8 (54.5 overs); Geoff Howarth 60 (94); Somachandra De Silva 3/59 (21 overs)		97 (27.3 overs); Arjuna Ranatunga 51 (47); Stephen Boock 5/28 (9.3 overs)

New Zealand won by 165 runs
Asgiriya Stadium, Kandy
Umpires: Herbi Felsinger (SL) and PW Vidanagamage (SL)

- New Zealand won the toss elected to bat first.
- Jayantha Amerasinghe and Sanath Kaluperuma (both SL) made their debut.
- Monday 12 March was taken as a rest day.

=== 2nd Test ===
16–21 March 1984
Scorecard

Sri Lanka	v	New Zealand
174 (90.5 overs); Ranjan Madugalle 44* 132; Lance Cairns 4/47 (24.5 overs)		198 (64.3 overs); Jeff Crowe 50 (144); Ravi Ratnayeke 5/42 (21 overs)
289/9 (127 overs); Roy Dias 108 (215); Ewen Chatfield 4/78 (29 overs)		123/4 (86 overs); John Wright 48 (209); Vinothen John 2/26 (21 overs)

Match drawn
Sinhalese Sports Club Ground, Colombo
Umpires: Dooland Buultjens (SL) and Herbi Felsinger (SL)

- New Zealand won the toss elected to field first.
- Monday 19 March was taken as a rest day.
- Martin Crowe (NZ) after dislocating a finger in the Sri Lanka 1st innings attempting a slip catch, and with a stomach disorder, took a test record 210 minutes to reach double figures.

=== 3rd Test ===
24–29 March 1984
Scorecard

Sri Lanka	v	New Zealand
256 (82 overs); Ranjan Madugalle 89* (188); Ewen Chatfield 5/63 (22 overs)		459 (175 overs); John Reid 180 (445); Vinothen John 3/99 (37 overs)
142 (57 overs); Arjuna Ranatunga 50 (92); Richard Hadlee 5/29 (16 overs)

New Zealand won by an innings and 61 runs
Colombo Cricket Club Ground, Colombo
Umpires: K T Francis (SL) and PW Vidanagamage (SL)

- Sri Lanka won the toss elected to bat first.
- Tuesday 27 March as taken as a rest day.
- John Reid (NZ) faced 445 balls in 685 minutes for his highest first class score.

== One Day Internationals (ODIs) ==
New Zealand won the series 2-1.

=== 1st ODI ===
3 March 1984
Scorecard

New Zealand; 234/6 (42 overs)	v	Sri Lanka; 130 (37.3 overs)
JF Reid 80 (76); JR Ratnayeke 2/37 (8 overs)		DSBP Kuruppu 38 (55); RJ Hadlee 3/22 (8.3 overs)

New Zealand won by 104 runs
Sinhalese Sports Club Ground, Colombo
Umpires: DP Buultjens and HC Felsinger
Player of the match: JF Reid (NZ)

- Sri Lanka won the toss and elected to field.
- The match was reduced from 45 overs to 42 overs per side.

=== 2nd ODI ===
31 March 1984
Scorecard

Sri Lanka; 157/8 (40 overs)	v	New Zealand; 116 (34 overs)
A Ranatunga 50* (60); EJ Chatfield 2/29 (8 overs)		RJ Hadlee 13 (20); DA Stirling 13* (21); Extras 13; SHU Kamain 5/26 (8 overs)

Sri Lanka won by 41 runs
Tyronne Fernando Stadium, Moratuwa
Umpires: KT Francis and PW Vidanagamage
Player of the match: SHU Kamain (SL)

- New Zealand won the toss and elected to field.
- The match was reduced before play started from 45 overs to 40 overs per side.
- PA de Silva and SHU Kamain (both SL), and DA Stirling (NZ) made their ODI debuts.

=== 3rd ODI ===
1 April 1984
Scorecard

New Zealand; 201/8 (44 overs)	v	Sri Lanka; 115 (38.1 overs)
MD Crowe 68 (84); A Ranatunga 3/49 (9 overs)		S Wettimuny 33 (62); RJ Hadlee 3/19 (6 overs)

New Zealand won by 86 runs
Paikiasothy Saravanamuttu Stadium, Colombo
Umpires: HC Felsinger and KT Francis
Player of the match: BL Cairns (NZ)

- Sri Lanka won the toss and elected to field.
- The match was reduced from 45 overs to 44 overs per side.
