= Zimbabwean cricket team in New Zealand in 1997–98 =

International cricket tour

| | New Zealand | Zimbabwe |
- Dates: 3 February – 8 March 1998
| Captains | Stephen Fleming | Alistair Campbell |

Test series
- Result: New Zealand won the 2-match series 2–0
| Most runs | Craig McMillan (227) | Andy Flower (156) |
| Most wickets | Chris Cairns (11); Simon Doull (11) | Paul Strang (7) |

One Day International series
- Results: New Zealand won the 5-match series 4–1
| Most runs | Nathan Astle (351) | Andy Flower (145) |
| Most wickets | Shayne O'Connor (9) | Paul Strang (9) |

The Zimbabwe national cricket team toured New Zealand in February and March 1998 and played a two-match Test series against the New Zealand national cricket team followed by five Limited Overs Internationals (LOI). New Zealand won both Test matches convincingly to take the series 2–0. New Zealand were captained by Stephen Fleming and Zimbabwe by Alistair Campbell. New Zealand won the LOI series 4–1.

== One Day Internationals (ODIs) ==
=== 1st ODI ===
4 February 1998
Scorecard

| New Zealand; 248/7 (50 overs) | v | Zimbabwe; 208 (48.2 overs) |
| CZ Harris 52* (59); PA Strang 3/40 (10 overs) | | A Flower 60 (66); DL Vettori 4/49 (10 overs) |

New Zealand won by 40 runs
WestpacTrust Park, Hamilton
Umpires: RS Dunne and CE King
Player of the match: CZ Harris (NZ)

- New Zealand won the toss and elected to bat.
- LG Howell (NZ) made his ODI debut.

=== 2nd ODI ===
6 February 1998
Scorecard

| Zimbabwe; 138 (49 overs) | v | New Zealand; 139/2 (28.2 overs) |
| DP Viljoen 36 (69); SB O'Connor 5/39 (10 overs) | | NJ Astle 67 (89); HH Streak 1/20 (7 overs) |

New Zealand won by 8 wickets
Basin Reserve, Wellington
Umpires: CE King and EA Watkin
Player of the match: SB O'Connor (NZ)

- New Zealand won the toss and elected to field.

=== 3rd ODI ===
4 March 1998 (D/N)
Scorecard

| Zimbabwe; 228/7 (50 overs) | v | New Zealand; 227/9 (50 overs) |
| MW Goodwin 58 (77); SB O'Connor 2/31 (7 overs) | | NJ Astle 69 (99); PA Strang 3/44 (10 overs) |

Zimbabwe won by 1 run
Lancaster Park, Christchurch
Umpires: BF Bowden and CE King
Player of the match: MW Goodwin (ZIM)

- New Zealand won the toss and elected to field.

=== 4th ODI ===
6 March 1998 (D/N)
Scorecard

| Zimbabwe; 207/8 (50 overs) | v | New Zealand; 211/1 (45.4 overs) |
| CB Wishart 41 (65); DJ Nash 3/29 (10 overs) | | NJ Astle 104* (137); DP Viljoen 1/30 (6 overs) |

New Zealand won by 9 wickets
McLean Park, Napier
Umpires: DB Cowie and AL Hill
Player of the match: NJ Astle (NZ)

- Zimbabwe won the toss and elected to bat.

=== 5th ODI ===
8 March 1998
Scorecard

| New Zealand; 231/9 (50 overs) | v | Zimbabwe; 229/9 (50 overs) |
| NJ Astle 62 (84); PA Strang 3/44 (10 overs) | | GW Flower 55 (75); DL Vettori 3/29 (10 overs) |

New Zealand won by 2 runs
Eden Park, Auckland
Umpires: DB Cowie and DM Quested
Player of the match: DL Vettori (NZ)

- New Zealand won the toss and elected to bat.

== Test series summary ==
=== First Test ===
19–22 February 1998
Scorecard

| Zimbabwe | v | New Zealand |
| 180 (85.3 overs); Heath Streak 39 (96); Shayne O'Connor 4/52 (18.3 overs) | | 411 (145.1 overs); Craig McMillan 139 (209); Adam Huckle 3/102 (40 overs) |
| 250 (106.3 overs); Murray Goodwin 72 (188); Chris Cairns 4/56 (24.3 overs) | | 20/0 (3.5 overs); Bryan Young 10* (12) |

New Zealand won by 10 wickets
Basin Reserve, Wellington
Umpires: Steve Dunne (NZ) and Steve Randel (AUS)
Player of the match: Craig McMillan (NZ)

- Zimbabwe won the toss and elected to bat.

=== Second Test ===
26–28 February 1998
Scorecard

| Zimbabwe | v | New Zealand |
| 170 (62.5 overs); Andy Flower 65 (131); Simon Doull 4/35 (20 overs) | | 460 (120.1 overs); Matt Horne 157 (260); Paul Strang 4/54 (18.1 overs) |
| 277 (94.4 overs); Andy Flower 83 (131); Simon Doull 4/50 (19.4 overs) |

New Zealand on by an innings and 13 runs
Eden Park, Auckland
Umpires: Doug Cowie (NZ) and Steve Randell (AUS)
Player of the match: Matt Horne (NZ)

- Zimbabwe won the toss and elected to bat.
