= New Zealand cricket team in Bangladesh in 2004–05 =

	Bangladesh	New Zealand
- Dates: 14 October – 7 November 2004
Captains	Khaled Mashud Tests	Stephen Fleming

Test series
- Result: New Zealand won the 2-match series 2–0
Most runs	Khaled Mashud (94)	Stephen Fleming (231)
Most wickets	Mohammad Rafique (9)	Daniel Vettori (20)
- Player of the series: Daniel Vettori (NZ)

One Day International series
- Results: New Zealand won the 3-match series 3–0
Most runs	Khaled Mashud (83)	Mathew Sinclair (128)
Most wickets	Aftab Ahmed (6)	Daniel Vettori (7)
- Player of the series: Scott Styris (NZ)

New Zealand cricket team toured Bangladesh from 14 October to 7 November 2004. They played two Test matches and three One Day Internationals against Bangladesh. New Zealand won all five matches.

== Tour match ==
=== Bangladesh Cricket Board XI vs New Zealanders ===
14 October – 16 October
Scorecard

New Zealanders (New Zealand)	v	Bangladesh Cricket Board XI
344/6d (81 overs); Stephen Fleming 129; Shahadat Hossain 2/59 (11 overs)		208 (87.1 overs); Hannan Sarkar 44; Mohammad Ashraful 44; Jacob Oram 2/16 (11 overs)
351/4d (75.5 overs); Nathan Astle 113; Mohammad Ashraful 2/62 (12.5 overs)

Match drawn
Bangladesh Krira Shikkha Protisthan Ground, Savar
Umpires: Showkatur Rahman & Ziaul Islam

== Test series ==
=== 1st Test ===
17–21 October
Scorecard

Bangladesh	v	New Zealand
177 (98.5 overs); Mohammad Ashraful 67 (225); James Franklin 5/28 (17 overs)		402 (145.1 overs); Brendon McCullum 143 (339); Mohammad Rafique 6/122 (59.1 overs)
126 (54.5 overs); Nafees Iqbal 49 (146); Daniel Vettori 6/28 (22 overs)

New Zealand won by an innings and 99 runs
Bangabandhu National Stadium, Dhaka
Umpires: Mark Benson (Eng) and Daryl Harper (Aus)
Player of the match: Brendon McCullum (NZ)

- Bangladesh won the toss and elected to bat.
- Nafees Iqbal (Ban) made his Test debut.

=== 2nd Test ===
26–30 October
Scorecard

New Zealand	v	Bangladesh
545/6d (152 overs); Stephen Fleming 202 (446); Mohammad Rafique 3/130 (55 overs)		182 (71.2 overs); Javed Omar 58 (198); Daniel Vettori 6/70 (32.2 overs)
		262 (70.2 overs) (f/o); Tapash Baisya 66 (44); Daniel Vettori 6/100 (28.2 overs)

New Zealand won by an innings and 101 runs
MA Aziz Stadium, Chittagong
Umpires: Mark Benson (Eng) and Daryl Harper (Aus)
Player of the match: Stephen Fleming (NZ)

- New Zealand won the toss and elected to bat.
- Aftab Ahmed (Ban) made his Test debut.

== ODI series ==
=== 1st ODI ===
2 November
Scorecard

New Zealand; 224 (49.2 overs)	v	Bangladesh; 86 (31.5 overs)
Chris Cairns 74 (102); Nazmul Hossain 4/40 (8.2 overs)		Habibul Bashar 22 (59); Kyle Mills 4/14 (7 overs)

New Zealand won by 138 runs
MA Aziz Stadium, Chittagong
Umpires: A. F. M. Akhtaruddin (Ban) and Mark Benson (Eng)
Player of the match: Chris Cairns (NZ)

- New Zealand won the toss and elected to bat.
- Peter Fulton (NZ) made his ODI debut.

=== 2nd ODI ===
5 November (D/N)
Scorecard

Bangladesh; 146 (43.4 overs)	v	New Zealand; 148/7 (44.4 overs)
Khaled Mashud 41 (65); Scott Styris 3/16 (7.4 overs)		Mathew Sinclair 62 (107); Aftab Ahmed 5/31 (10 overs)

New Zealand won by 3 wickets
Bangabandhu National Stadium, Dhaka
Umpires: Mark Benson (Eng) and Mahbubur Rahman (Ban)
Player of the match: Aftab Ahmed (Ban)

- Bangladesh won the toss and elected to bat.

=== 3rd ODI ===
7 November (D/N)
Scorecard

New Zealand; 250/7 (50 overs)	v	Bangladesh; 167/7 (50 overs)
Mathew Sinclair 66 (110); Mohammad Rafique 4/63 (10 overs)		Nafees Iqbal 40 (98); Khaled Mashud 40* (76); Daniel Vettori 3/25 (10 overs)

New Zealand won by 83 runs
Bangabandhu National Stadium, Dhaka
Umpires: A. F. M. Akhtaruddin (Ban) and Mark Benson (Eng)
Player of the match: Scott Styris (NZ)

- New Zealand won the toss and elected to bat.
