= New Zealand cricket team in the West Indies in 2002 =

	New Zealand	West Indies
- Dates: 3 June – 2 July 2002
Captains	Stephen Fleming	Carl Hooper

Test series
- Result: New Zealand won the 2-match series 1–0
Most runs	Mark Richardson (207)	Chris Gayle (280)
Most wickets	Shane Bond (12)	Pedro Collins (12)
- Player of the series: Shane Bond (NZ)

One Day International series
- Results: West Indies won the 5-match series 3–1
Most runs	Stephen Fleming (192)	Chris Gayle (194)
Most wickets	Scott Styris (7)	Chris Gayle (12)
- Player of the series: Chris Gayle (WI)

The New Zealand national cricket team toured the West Indies in June 2002 to play two Test matches and five Limited Overs Internationals.

== Squads ==
Tests		ODIs	
West Indies	New Zealand	West Indies	New Zealand
Carl Hooper (c)	Stephen Fleming (c)	Carl Hooper (c)	Stephen Fleming (c)
Shivnarine Chanderpaul	Nathan Astle	Gareth Breese	Nathan Astle
Pedro Collins	Shane Bond	Shivnarine Chanderpaul	Shane Bond
Cameron Cuffy	Ian Butler	Pedro Collins	Ian Butler
Mervyn Dillon	Chris Harris	Corey Collymore	Chris Harris
Chris Gayle	Robbie Hart (wk)	Cameron Cuffy	Matthew Hart
Ryan Hinds	Matt Horne	Mervyn Dillon	Paul Hitchcock
Wavell Hinds	Craig McMillan	Chris Gayle	Matt Horne
Ridley Jacobs (wk)	Chris Martin	Ryan Hinds	Craig McMillan
Brian Lara	Mark Richardson	Wavell Hinds	Chris Nevin (wk)
Mahendra Nagamootoo	Scott Styris	Ridley Jacobs (wk)	Jacob Oram
Daren Powell	Daryl Tuffey	Brian Lara	Scott Styris
Adam Sanford	Daniel Vettori	Adam Sanford	Daryl Tuffey
Ramnaresh Sarwan	Lou Vincent (wk)	Ramnaresh Sarwan	Daniel Vettori
			Lou Vincent (wk)

== Tour match ==
=== 50-over: West Indies Vice Chancellor's XI v New Zealanders ===
3 June 2002
Scorecard

New Zealanders; 254 (50 overs)	v	West Indies Vice Chancellor's XI; 155 (40 overs)
Scott Styris 64* (46); Jermaine Lawson 3/60 (10 overs)		Donovan Pagon 43 (69); Daniel Vettori 3/24 (7 overs)

New Zealanders won by 85 runs (D/L method)
Sir Frank Worrell Cricket Ground, Kingston
Player of the match: Scott Styris (NZ)

- New Zealanders won the toss and elected to bat.

== ODI series ==
=== 1st ODI ===
5 June 2002
Scorecard

New Zealand; 176 (49.4 overs)	v	West Indies
Craig McMillan 69 (101); Chris Gayle 3/26 (9.4 overs)

No result
Sabina Park, Kingston, Jamaica
Umpires: Asoka de Silva (SL) and Billy Doctrove (WI)

- New Zealand won the toss and elected to bat.
- Rain prevented any play in the West Indies innings.
- Paul Hitchcock (NZ) made his ODI debut.

=== 2nd ODI ===
8 June 2002
Scorecard

New Zealand; 248/7 (50 overs)	v	West Indies; 250/4 (49.1 overs)
Stephen Fleming 89 (116); Pedro Collins 3/33 (9 overs)		Shivnarine Chanderpaul 108* (138); Paul Hitchcock 3/43 (10 overs)

West Indies won by 6 wickets
Beausejour Stadium, Gros Islet, Saint Lucia
Umpires: Rudi Koertzen (SA) and Eddie Nicholls (WI)
Player of the match: Shivnarine Chanderpaul (WI)

- West Indies won the toss and elected to field.

=== 3rd ODI ===
9 June 2002
Scorecard

New Zealand; 210/7 (50 overs)	v	West Indies; 211/3 (40 overs)
Lou Vincent 60* (86); Chris Gayle 2/34 (10 overs)		Brian Lara 59* (80); Chris Harris 2/43 (10 overs)

West Indies won by 7 wickets
Beausejour Stadium, Gros Islet, Saint Lucia
Umpires: Asoka de Silva (SL) and Billy Doctrove (WI)
Player of the match: Brian Lara (WI)

- New Zealand won the toss and elected to bat.

=== 4th ODI ===
12 June 2002
Scorecard

New Zealand; 212/5 (44.2 overs)	v	West Indies; 202/9 (33 overs)
Nathan Astle 91* (118); Mervyn Dillon 2/26 (6 overs)		Ridley Jacobs 60* (45); Scott Styris 6/25 (7 overs)

New Zealand won by 9 runs (D/L method)
Queen's Park Oval, Port of Spain, Trinidad
Umpires: Rudi Koertzen (SA) and Eddie Nicholls (WI)
Player of the match: Scott Styris (NZ)

- New Zealand won the toss and elected to bat.

=== 5th ODI ===
16 June 2002
Scorecard

New Zealand; 291/8 (50 overs)	v	West Indies; 292/6 (50 overs)
Craig McMillan 83 (87); Chris Gayle 4/54 (10 overs)		Chris Gayle 67 (79); Shane Bond 2/41 (10 overs)

West Indies won by 4 wickets
Arnos Vale Ground, Kingstown, Saint Vincent
Umpires: Asoka de Silva (SL) and Billy Doctrove (WI)
Player of the match: Chris Gayle (WI)

- New Zealand won the toss and elected to bat.
- Shivnarine Chanderpaul retired hurt from 60/0 to 274/6.

== Test series ==
=== 1st Test ===
21–24 June 2002
Scorecard

New Zealand	v	West Indies
337 (125.4 overs); Stephen Fleming 130 (230); Daren Powell 2/41 (21 overs)		107 (42.1 overs); Shivnarine Chanderpaul 35* (76); Daniel Vettori 4/27 (12.1 overs)
243 (90.4 overs); Nathan Astle 77 (112); Pedro Collins 6/76 (30.4 overs)		269 (83 overs); Chris Gayle 73 (131); Brian Lara 73 (131); Shane Bond 5/78 (21 overs)

New Zealand won by 204 runs
Kensington Oval, Bridgetown, Barbados
Umpires: Rudi Koertzen (SA) and Srinivasaraghavan Venkataraghavan (Ind)
Player of the match: Stephen Fleming (NZ)

- West Indies won the toss and elected to field.
- Daren Powell (WI) made his Test debut.

=== 2nd Test ===
28 June–2 July 2002
Scorecard

New Zealand	v	West Indies
373 (152.5 overs); Scott Styris 107 (178); Pedro Collins 4/68 (30 overs)		470 (138.1 overs); Chris Gayle 204 (332); Shane Bond 5/104 (30.1 overs)
256/5 (131 overs); Mark Richardson 71 (260); Carl Hooper 2/66 (34 overs)

Match drawn
Queen's Park, St. George's, Grenada
Umpires: Rudi Koertzen (SA) and Srinivasaraghavan Venkataraghavan (Ind)
Player of the match: Chris Gayle (WI)

- West Indies won the toss and elected to field.
- Scott Styris (NZ) made his Test debut.
