= Murphy Su'a =

New Zealand international cricketer

Personal information
- Full name: Murphy Logo Su'a
- Born: 7 November 1966 (age 60); Whanganui, New Zealand
- Batting: Left-handed
- Bowling: Left-arm fast-medium
- Relatives: Sebastian Su'a (son)

International information
- National side: New Zealand (1992–1995)
- Test debut (cap 176): 30 January 1992 v England
- Last Test: 18 March 1995 v Sri Lanka
- ODI debut (cap 77): 12 February 1992 v England
- Last ODI: 26 March 1995 v Sri Lanka

Domestic team information
- Years: Team
- 1988/89–1989/90: Northern Districts
- 1990/91–1995/96: Auckland

Career statistics
Competition	Test	ODI	FC	LA
Matches	13	12	51	36
Runs scored	165	24	828	252
Batting average	12.69	4.79	18.40	12.60
100s/50s	0/0	0/0	0/2	0/0
Top score	44	12*	56	33*
Balls bowled	2,843	463	4,794	1,212
Wickets	36	9	141	43
Bowling average	38.25	40.77	34.00	28.18
5 wickets in innings	2	0	7	2
10 wickets in match	0	0	0	0
Best bowling	5/73	4/59	6/56	6/26
Catches/stumpings	8/–	1/–	12/–	8/–
- Source: Cricinfo, 4 May 2017

Murphy Logo Su'a (born 7 November 1966) is a former New Zealand cricketer, who played 13 Test matches and 12 One Day Internationals for New Zealand. He was the first cricketer of Samoan descent to play Test cricket for New Zealand.

Murphy Su'a played for the Auckland Cricket Association from 1990 to 1996 and represented New Zealand in that period, including being a member of the 1992 World Cup squad. He played his senior club cricket for Eden Roskill after playing in many junior age group sides in the Northern Districts area. Since retiring as a player, he worked as the Samoa national cricket team coach.

== International career ==
Murphy Su'a made his international debut on 30 January 1992 in the second Test of the three-match series against England at Eden Park as he took three wickets. In the process he became the first player with Pacific Island descent to play for New Zealand. Nine day later, he went on to make his One Day International debut against the same team at Carisbrook.

After being selected for the 1992 Cricket World Cup and not receiving a single game, his next international appearance was in the Zimbabwe series where in the second test played at the Harare Sports Club, he recorded his first five-wicket haul in the first innings as he helped New Zealand win by 177 runs. After taking only five wickets in the series against Sri Lanka, he recorded his best Test figures of 5–73 against Pakistan in the only Test match of that series.

The 1993 series against Australia saw Su'a score his highest test score of 44 in the second innings but not before avoiding being run-out due to the third-umpire as he was comfortably home. In November of that year, he would only go on to play two Tests of a three-match series in Australia where he took three wickets.

In late 1994, Su'a was selected to play in the Mandela Trophy where he would play in five matches throughout the tournament, taking five wickets at an average of 30 with his best figures of 4/59 being against South Africa on 11 December 1994.
