= John Fulton Reid =

New Zealand cricketer (1956–2020)

Personal information
- Born: 3 March 1956; Auckland, New Zealand
- Died: 28 December 2020 (aged 64); Christchurch, New Zealand
- Batting: Left-handed
- Bowling: Legbreak
- Role: Batsman
- Relatives: Bruce Reid (cousin)

International information
- National side: New Zealand (1979–1986)
- Test debut (cap 144): 23 February 1979 v Pakistan
- Last Test: 13 March 1986 v Australia
- ODI debut (cap 36): 6 February 1980 v West Indies
- Last ODI: 2 February 1986 v India

Domestic team information
- Years: Team
- 1975/76–1987/88: Auckland

Career statistics
Competition	Test	ODI	FC	LA
Matches	19	25	101	66
Runs scored	1,296	633	5,650	2,165
Batting average	46.28	27.52	38.17	40.09
100s/50s	6/2	0/4	11/29	1/13
Top score	180	88	180	118
Balls bowled	18	0	483	0
Wickets	0	–	6	–
Bowling average	–	–	36.83	–
5 wickets in innings	–	–	0	–
10 wickets in match	–	–	0	–
Best bowling	–	–	2/5	–
Catches/stumpings	9/–	5/–	116/9	27/–
- Source: Cricinfo, 4 February 2017

John Fulton Reid (3 March 1956 – 28 December 2020) was a New Zealand cricketer. He was born in Auckland.

== Cricket career ==
Reid completed his education at Lynfield College, well known for its cricket. Reid house at Lynfield College is named after him. He worked as a high school geography teacher while playing cricket.

Reid played in 19 Test matches and 25 One Day Internationals between 1979 and 1986. His Test average was 46.28 and included six Test centuries. His ODI average was 27.52. Despite having a very respectable batting average of 46.28, it was revealed by Cricinfo that Reid had the biggest difference in batting averages between first and second innings. He had a first innings average of 68.41, but a second innings average of only 12.09, a difference of more than 56 runs.

Ian Smith said that Reid's greatest innings for New Zealand was when he played against Sri Lanka in 1984 in Colombo. Reid batted for 11 hours for 180 runs off 445 balls in very hot conditions. This led New Zealand to win the match.

John Reid played an important part in New Zealand's first test win over Australia in Australia in 1985. He scored 108 runs and combined with Martin Crowe for a third wicket stand of 284. Richard Hadlee said of Reid "His contribution was quite significant ... those two put the game firmly in our control and gave us a significant lead that allowed us to win that first ever test in Australia".

John Reid 's cousin is former Australian cricketer Bruce Reid.

John Wright described him as “a person he was a good team man. He was a quiet achiever. He was always constant. Dependable. Reliable. Astute”

Ian Smith described him as "my ideal No 3 and in his all too few appearances at test level he showed why...a great judge of line, which made many accomplished overseas attacks adjust their plans. He had great stick-ability".

== Cricket administration career ==
John Reid was the chief executive of Auckland Cricket. He then appointed as the New Zealand caretaker coach for the centenary season of 1994–95. Moving south to Canterbury, he was appointed in 1996 as New Zealand Cricket's cricket operations manager and high-performance manager. He led the establishment of New Zealand Cricket's National High Performance Centre at Lincoln. This included developing the Bert Sutcliffe Oval, supporting grounds and the indoor training facility.

John Reid took on a new position with Sport NZ in 2005 and was a trustee of the Selwyn Sports Trust. In 2015 John Reid began a new role as the Selwyn District Council's major projects property manager. The wooden floor sports hall at the Selwyn Sports Centre in Rolleston has been named after John Reid in appreciation for his work as a champion of the courts and community sport in Selwyn.

== Death ==
John Reid died of cancer in Christchurch on 28 December 2020.
