= New Zealand cricket team in Ireland in 2026 =

International cricket tour

	Ireland	New Zealand
- Dates: 27 – 30 May 2026
Captains	Andrew Balbirnie	Tom Latham

Test series
- Result: New Zealand won the 1-match series 1–0
Most runs	Andy McBrine (86)	Tom Blundell (186)
Most wickets	Mark Adair (3)	Nathan Smith (8)

The New Zealand cricket team visited Ireland in May 2026 to play a Test match against the Ireland cricket team. In March 2026, Cricket Ireland (CI) confirmed the fixtures for the tour, as a part of the 2026 home international season.

== Squads ==
Ireland	New Zealand
Andrew Balbirnie (c); Mark Adair; Curtis Campher; Cade Carmichael; Stephen Doheny; Jake Egan; Matthew Humphreys; Thomas Mayes; Andy McBrine; Liam McCarthy; Harry Tector; Lorcan Tucker (wk); Reuben Wilson; Craig Young	Tom Latham (c); Tom Blundell (wk); Kristian Clarke; Devon Conway; Zak Foulkes; Dean Foxcroft; Matt Henry; Kyle Jamieson; Daryl Mitchell; Henry Nicholls; Will O'Rourke; Glenn Phillips; Michael Rae; Rachin Ravindra; Ben Sears; Nathan Smith; Blair Tickner; Kane Williamson; Will Young

== Test series ==
=== Only Test ===
27–30 May 2026
Scorecard

New Zealand	v	Ireland
490/8d (119 overs); Tom Blundell 186 (292); Mark Adair 3/66 (20 overs)		179 (45 overs); Andy McBrine 73* (105); Nathan Smith 6/40 (14 overs)
		232 (63.2 overs) (f/o); Stephen Doheny 57 (117); Blair Tickner 5/76 (17.2 overs)

New Zealand won by an innings and 79 runs
Stormont Cricket Ground, Belfast
Umpires: Rod Tucker (Aus) and Alex Wharf (Eng)
Player of the match: Tom Blundell (NZ)

- Ireland won the toss and elected to field.
- This was first ever Test match between the two countries.
- Thomas Mayes, Liam McCarthy, Reuben Wilson (Ire) and Dean Foxcroft (NZ) all made their Test debuts.
- Nathan Smith and Blair Tickner (NZ) both took their first five-wicket haul in Tests.
