= Warren Lees =

New Zealand cricketer (born 1952)

Warren Lees MBE
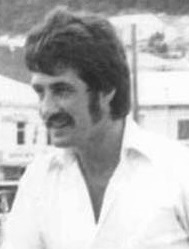
- Lees in 1978

Personal information
- Full name: Warren Kenneth Lees
- Born: 19 March 1952 (age 74); Dunedin, Otago, New Zealand
- Batting: Right-handed
- Role: Wicket-keeper

International information
- National side: New Zealand (1979–1983)
- Test debut (cap 135): 9 October 1976 v Pakistan
- Last Test: 25 August 1983 v England
- ODI debut (cap 32): 9 June 1979 v Sri Lanka
- Last ODI: 20 June 1983 v Pakistan

Domestic team information
- Years: Team
- 1971/72–1987/88: Otago

Career statistics
Competition	Test	ODI	FC	LA
Matches	21	31	146	81
Runs scored	778	215	4,932	1,071
Batting average	23.57	11.31	24.66	18.78
100s/50s	1/1	0/0	5/18	0/4
Top score	152	26	152	73*
Balls bowled	5	–	247	1
Wickets	0	–	2	0
Bowling average	–	–	54.50	–
5 wickets in innings	–	–	0	–
10 wickets in match	–	–	0	–
Best bowling	–	–	1/34	–
Catches/stumpings	52/7	28/2	304/44	82/10
- Source: Cricinfo, 4 April 2017

Warren Kenneth Lees MBE (born 19 March 1952) is a New Zealand cricketer and coach. He played 21 Test matches and 31 One Day Internationals (ODIs) between 1976 and 1983 as a wicket-keeper batsman. He was coach of the New Zealand national cricket team between 1990 and 1993.

Lees was born at Dunedin in 1952 and educated at King's High School in the city.

== Domestic career ==
Lees made his first-class debut in February 1971, playing for a New Zealand under-23 side against Auckland. He made his Otago debut in December 1971 and played for the province's representative side until the end of the 1987–88 season. He played 146 first-class matches and scored 4,932 runs as well as 81 List A matches, scoring 1,071 runs. In his final season as captain of Otago (1987–88), Otago won both the one-day and first-class competitions.

== International career ==
Lees followed Ken Wadsworth into the New Zealand side and soon proved himself a capable wicketkeeper-batsman. In only his third Test, against Pakistan at Karachi in 1976–77, he made 152 at a time New Zealand were in deep trouble and followed with 46 in the second innings to save the match.

He was very unfortunate to be left out of the tour of England in 1978, arguably being a better wicketkeeper and batsman than Jock Edwards, his replacement, who was described by one journalist as the worst wicketkeeper he had ever seen. He returned to England the following year as part the New Zealand side which reached the semi-finals of the World Cup, but the emergence of Ian Smith meant that these opportunities thereafter were limited.

In 1982–83 he took five catches in an innings and eight in the match against Sri Lanka at Wellington, and played his final Tests on the 1983 tour of England.

== Coaching career ==
=== Otago ===
After ending his cricketing career he turned to coaching in 1989, he remained there until 1990 before being promoted to national team with which he spent nearly three years.

=== New Zealand ===
Lees' first tour in charge was very tough. New Zealand lost all three Tests and three ODIs, against Pakistan by big margins. Travelling did not get any easier, and they managed only one win on the road, against Zimbabwe in Harare. But there was one standout moment as coach for Lees – the 1992 World Cup.

New Zealand reached the semi-final of the tournament, losing to eventual champions Pakistan. He found good players for New Zealand but was not able to find any of great players. Players like Gavin Larsen, Rod Latham and Willie Watson were his find under Martin Crowe as captain of the team.

It was a tour abroad that ended Lees' national coaching role. After the team abandoned their trip to Sri Lanka in November and December 1992, when bomb blasts threatened their safety.

In 2014, after spending years with Black Caps, Lees became an interim coach of a New Zealand women's national cricket team called White Ferns. During that year, his team had participated in the 2017 World Cup against Sri Lanka and won seven wickets at the County Cricket Ground, Derby.

From 2012 until 2017 Warren Lees spent five years as the coach of the Otago Sparks cricket team. He considers the two titles that they won as a highlight in his coaching career.

== Honours ==
In the 1989 Queen's Birthday Honours, Lees was appointed a Member of the Order of the British Empire, for services to cricket.

== Personal life ==
Lees lives in Clyde, Central Otago, with his wife Jude. He spends his days coaching what he calls "country kids", who do not have access to the same resources as their counterparts in big cities.
