= Shayne O'Connor =

New Zealand cricketer (born 1973)

Personal information
- Full name: Shayne Barry O'Connor
- Born: 15 November 1973 (age 53); Hastings, Hawke's Bay, New Zealand
- Batting: Left-handed
- Bowling: Left-arm fast-medium

International information
- National side: New Zealand (1997–2001)
- Test debut (cap 202): 18 September 1997 v Zimbabwe
- Last Test: 8 November 2001 v Australia
- ODI debut (cap 103): 20 May 1997 v Sri Lanka
- Last ODI: 4 November 2000 v South Africa

Domestic team information
- Years: Team
- 1994/95–1995/96: Central Otago
- 1994/95–2002/03: Otago

Career statistics
Competition	Test	ODI	FC	LA
Matches	19	38	73	104
Runs scored	103	24	790	264
Batting average	5.72	3.42	12.53	8.80
100s/50s	0/0	0/0	0/0	0/0
Top score	20	8	47	22
Balls bowled	3,667	1,487	14,199	4,854
Wickets	53	46	278	145
Bowling average	32.52	30.34	23.67	26.88
5 wickets in innings	1	2	16	2
10 wickets in match	0	0	2	0
Best bowling	5/51	5/39	6/31	5/39
Catches/stumpings	6/–	11/–	27/–	24/–
Medal record
Men's cricket
Representing New Zealand
ICC Champions Trophy
Winner	2000 Kenya
Commonwealth Games
Third place	1998 Kuala Lumpur
- Source: ESPNcricinfo, 4 May 2017

Shayne Barry O'Connor (born 15 November 1973) is a former New Zealand international cricketer, who played in 19 Test matches and 38 One Day Internationals between 1997 and 2001. After playing domestically for Otago between the 1994–95 and 2002–03 seasons, he retired from professional cricket after the 2003 Cricket World Cup.

O'Connor was born at Hastings in the Hawke's Bay Region into a farming family. He was educated at Napier Boys' High School. He played for Central Districts age-group teams and the national under-19 team before making his senior representative debut for Otago during the 1994–95 season. In a career which lasted until the end of the 2002–03 season, O'Connor played in 78 top-level matches for Otago, taking 230 wickets for the team in first-class and List A matches. He also played Hawke Cup cricket for Central Otago.

O'Connor played 57 times for the New Zealand national cricket team, including taking a five-wicket haul in the semi-final of the 2000 ICC KnockOut Trophy. He retired from cricket at the age of 29 in 2003, opting to take up an opportunity to establish a business at Alexandra in Central Otago. In 2023 he volunteered to act as a match referee in domestic cricket, with New Zealand Cricket suffering from a shortage of available officials. Ahead of the 2024–25 season he was formally appointed to the match referees panel.
