= Chris King (umpire) =

New Zealand cricket umpire

Christopher King
Personal information
- Full name: Christopher Ernest King
- Born: 1 February 1944; Slough, Buckinghamshire, England
- Died: 23 January 2022 (aged 77); Cosham, Portsmouth, Hampshire, England

Umpiring information
- Tests umpired: 3 (1993–1997)
- ODIs umpired: 25 (1992–1999)
- Source: Cricinfo, 9 July 2013

Christopher Ernest King (1 February 1944 – 23 January 2022) was a New Zealand cricket umpire, born in England. At the international level, he stood in three Test matches between 1993 and 1997 and 25 ODI games between 1992 and 1999.

== See also ==
- List of Test cricket umpires
- List of One Day International cricket umpires
