= Ian Smith (New Zealand cricketer) =

New Zealand cricketer (born 1957)

Ian Smith MBE
Personal information
- Full name: Ian David Stockley Smith
- Born: 28 February 1957 (age 69); Nelson, New Zealand
- Batting: Right-handed
- Bowling: Right-arm
- Role: Wicket-keeper
- Relatives: Jarrod Smith (son)

International information
- National side: New Zealand (1980–1992)
- Test debut (cap 148): 28 November 1980 v Australia
- Last Test: 10 February 1992 v England
- ODI debut (cap 38): 25 November 1980 v Australia
- Last ODI: 21 March 1992 v Pakistan

Domestic team information
- Years: Team
- 1977/78–1986/87: Central Districts
- 1987/88–1991/92: Auckland

Career statistics
Competition	Test	ODI	FC	LA
Matches	63	98	178	153
Runs scored	1,815	1,055	5,570	1,875
Batting average	25.56	17.29	26.77	17.85
100s/50s	2/6	0/3	6/24	0/5
Top score	173	62*	173	70
Balls bowled	18	–	81	46
Wickets	0	–	0	2
Bowling average	–	–	–	10.00
5 wickets in innings	–	–	–	0
10 wickets in match	–	–	–	0
Best bowling	–	–	–	2/11
Catches/stumpings	168/8	81/5	417/36	137/12
- Source: Cricinfo, 25 March 2017

Ian David Stockley Smith MBE (born 28 February 1957) is a New Zealand cricket and rugby commentator and former cricketer. He played as a wicket-keeper for New Zealand throughout the 1980s and part of the 1990s.

== Early life ==
Smith was born in Nelson, New Zealand to a family of keen golfers. They moved to Wanganui when he was one and then to Wellington when he was eight years old. It was here where Smith first played cricket at the Miramar Park Cricket Club. He was initially an off spinner who "batted a bit". He was a member of the Wellington Primary Schools' team and was selected for the North Island Primary Schools' team and captained the North Island under-12 soccer team in 1969. In his high school years, he moved to Palmerston North and concentrated on playing as a wicket-keeper. In 1978, he played as a substitute fielder for New Zealand in their Test match against Pakistan in Napier and was delighted to be paid NZ$100. His car broke down after the game and the repairs cost NZ$99.95.

== Domestic career ==
Ian Smith first played for Central Districts in 1978 against the touring English team. In his fourth game for Central Districts against Canterbury, he was knocked unconscious by a short delivery bowled by Richard Hadlee. Smith went off injured but returned the following day to make 60 runs. He had a particularly good season batting in 1982/3 for Central Districts, scoring three centuries (145 against Auckland, 111 and 143 against Northern Districts).

== International career ==
Ian Smith was first selected to play for New Zealand in 1980 on their Australian tour after having played for the Young New Zealand team. His first game for New Zealand was against a Victorian Country XI. He was not included in the test eleven for the first test in Brisbane at the 'Gabba but when Warren Lees failed a fitness test on the first morning, Smith was elevated into the test team.

By the end of his playing career, Smith had the second highest strike rate as a batsman who'd played at least 20 innings' for One Day Internationals – 99 runs per 100 balls faced, coming just behind Lance Cairns. He also holds the record for the highest score in Tests for a batsman coming in at number nine, which is 173 off 136 balls, scored against India at Eden Park in 1990. During the innings, he became joint holder of the record for most runs scored off a six-ball Test over, striking 24 runs off Atul Wassan.

== After cricket ==
After Smith retired from cricket, he worked in the banking industry before moving into broadcasting. He worked as a radio announcer on Radio Live SPORT as a breakfast host and was a commentator for Television New Zealand first, then Sky Sport (in New Zealand, commentating on both rugby union and cricket). He has worked on television commentary at numerous ICC tournaments including the World Twenty20 and Cricket World Cup calling the crucial final ball as England tied with New Zealand in the final at Lords. Smith's description of England winning the World Cup “by the barest of margins, the barest of all margins” has become iconic in English cricket. He has also appeared as a guest commentator on Sky Sports and Test Match Special in the UK during New Zealand tours of England.

He's also used for some of the Australian cricket coverage for Nine Network and now Fox Sports but doesn't appear on Spark Sport's coverage for home matches when Spark Sport and TVNZ took the rights off Sky.

Smith took an active role in presenting the Rugby World Cup on Sky in New Zealand in 2011.

In April 2020, Smith won New Zealand Cricket's most prestigious award, the Bert Sutcliffe Medal for Outstanding Contribution to Cricket.

In January 2023, Smith departed from Sky Sport after 23 years. Smith said of leaving "Sky TV has a changing face now, a long way removed from this old scaly, sunburnt one,''

His son Jarrod Smith is an association football player who has appeared for the New Zealand national team.

== Honours and awards ==
In the 1994 New Year Honours, Smith was appointed a Member of the Order of the British Empire, for services to cricket. In April 2020, he was awarded the Bert Sutcliffe Medal by New Zealand Cricket for outstanding services to cricket.
