= New Zealand cricket team in Zimbabwe in 1992–93 =

	Zimbabwe	New Zealand
- Dates: 31 October 1992 – 12 November 1992
Captains	Dave Houghton	Martin Crowe

Test series
- Result: New Zealand won the 2-match series 1–0
Most runs	Kevin Arnott (209)	Martin Crowe (249)
Most wickets	John Traicos (6)	Dipak Patel (15)

One Day International series
- Results: New Zealand won the 2-match series 2–0
Most runs	Mark Dekker (134)	Martin Crowe (134)
Most wickets	Grant Flower (4)	Dipak Patel (4)

The New Zealand cricket team toured Zimbabwe for a two-match Test series and a two-match One Day International (ODI) series between 31 October and 12 November 1992. New Zealand won the Test series, which was the first played between the two teams, 1–0 and the ODI series 2–0. The second ODI was played on the rest day during the second Test.

== Test series ==
=== 1st Test ===
1–5 November 1992
Scorecard

New Zealand	v	Zimbabwe
325/3 dec (96.1 overs); Rod Latham 119 (214); Ali Shah 1/46 (14 overs)		219 (93.4 overs); Andy Flower 81 (115); Dipak Patel 6/113 (40.4 overs)
222/5 dec (48 overs); Mark Greatbatch 88 (108); Malcolm Jarvis 3/38 (11 overs)		197/1 (71.1 overs); Kevin Arnott 101* (200); Dipak Patel 1/60 (28 overs)

Match drawn
Bulawayo Athletic Club, Bulawayo
Umpires: Dickie Bird (Eng), Kantilal Kanjee (Zim) and Ian Robinson (Zim)

- New Zealand won the toss and elected to bat.

=== 2nd Test ===
7, 9–12 November 1992
Scorecard

New Zealand	v	Zimbabwe
335 (94 overs); Martin Crowe 140 (163); David Brain 3/49 (18 overs)		283/9 dec (123 overs); Kevin Arnott 68 (155); Murphy Su'a 5/85 (37 overs)
262/5 dec (82.4 overs); Ken Rutherford 89 (159); Eddo Brandes 2/59 (19.4 overs)		137 (50.3 overs); Alistair Campbell 35 (89); Dipak Patel 6/50 (17.3 overs)

New Zealand won by 177 runs
Harare Sports Club, Harare
Umpires: Dickie Bird (Eng), Kantilal Kanjee (Zim) and Ian Robinson (Zim)

- New Zealand won the toss and elected to bat.

== ODI series ==
=== 1st ODI ===
31 October 1992
Scorecard

New Zealand; 244/7 (50 overs)	v	Zimbabwe; 222/9 (50 overs)
Andrew Jones 68 (106); Grant Flower 3/39 (10 overs)		Mark Dekker 79 (118); Dipak Patel 3/26 (10 overs)

New Zealand won by 22 runs
Bulawayo Athletic Club, Bulawayo
Umpires: Kantilal Kanjee (Zim) and Ian Robinson (Zim)
Player of the match: Dipak Patel (NZ)

- Zimbabwe won the toss and elected to field.

=== 2nd ODI ===
8 November 1992
Scorecard

Zimbabwe; 271/6 (50 overs)	v	New Zealand; 272/6 (46.5 overs)
Grant Flower 63 (93); Chris Harris 2/60 (10 overs)		Martin Crowe 94 (87); Eddo Brandes 3/74 (8.5 overs)

New Zealand won by 4 wickets
Harare Sports Club, Harare
Umpires: Kantilal Kanjee (Zim) and Ian Robinson (Zim)
Player of the match: Martin Crowe (NZ)

- Zimbabwe won the toss and elected to bat.
