= Rod Latham =

New Zealand cricketer

Personal information
- Full name: Rodney Terry Latham
- Born: 12 June 1961 (age 65); Christchurch, Canterbury, New Zealand
- Batting: Right-handed
- Bowling: Right-arm medium
- Relatives: Tom Latham (son)

International information
- National side: New Zealand (1990–1994)
- Test debut (cap 177): 6 February 1992 v England
- Last Test: 2 January 1993 v Pakistan
- ODI debut (cap 74): 1 December 1990 v England
- Last ODI: 19 January 1994 v Australia

Career statistics
Competition	Test	ODI	FC	LA
Matches	4	33	108	126
Runs scored	219	583	6,298	3,048
Batting average	31.28	20.10	37.04	26.97
100s/50s	1/0	0/1	9/36	1/12
Top score	119	60	237*	108
Balls bowled	18	450	1,532	1,637
Wickets	–	11	35	47
Bowling average	–	35.09	43.77	24.14
5 wickets in innings	–	1	0	1
10 wickets in match	–	0	0	0
Best bowling	–	5/32	3/20	5/32
Catches/stumpings	5/–	11/–	106/–	50/–
- Source: Cricinfo, 4 May 2017

Rodney Terry Latham (born 12 June 1961) is a former New Zealand cricketer. He played domestic cricket for Canterbury, and played four Tests and 33 One Day Internationals for New Zealand. He also played rugby union for Canterbury. He was born in Christchurch.

As a cricketer, he was an all-rounder whose bowling style suited mostly one-day cricket. He opened for New Zealand in the 1992 World Cup tournament. Latham played in four Test matches, scoring his only century (119) against Zimbabwe at Bulawayo in 1992.

Latham's son Wicketkeeper-Batsman Tom Latham has played cricket for New Zealand in all forms of the game.

== Rugby career ==
Latham played as a first five-eighth or fullback for the Linwood club and for the Canterbury representative team between 1980 and 1985.

Latham was selected for the New Zealand Juniors in 1980 and the New Zealand Colts in 1981.

== Cricket career ==
Latham made his international debut on 1 December 1990 when he played against England in Adelaide as part of the tri-nation series which featured Australia. On debut, he scored 27 runs which featured two fours in his short innings. This was followed by a 36* against Australia at the same venue the following day. After getting out early in his next three matches, he contributed a strong hitting 38 from 44 balls against Australia in Bellerive Oval to help New Zealand reach 194 and later win the match.

Latham made his test debut on the 6 February 1992 against England in Wellington after New Zealand was reduced to three front-line seamers after an injury to fellow player Willie Watson meant that New Zealand had no suitable replacements. On his test debut, he would score 25 runs as the match was drawn. He was later selected to be part of the New Zealand ODI squad where he recorded figures of 3/25 from his eight overs in the second ODI against England in Dunedin.

After being selected for the 1992 Cricket World Cup, Latham scored 136 runs from seven innings which included his highest ODI score of 60 against South Africa on the 29 February 1992 in Auckland as he aided in a 114-run opening partnership to get the victory. In October 1992, he was selected to be a part of the tour of Zimbabwe where he scored his only international century in the first test, top scoring with 115 in the first innings as New Zealand won the series 1–0 before the ODI series went 2–0 in favor of New Zealand. He would play his last test match at the start of 1993 with Latham only scoring two runs in a defeat to Pakistan at Hamilton.

In the last ODI of the 1993 Australian series, he recorded his only five-wicket haul in international cricket when he took 5/32 from his ten overs in a three-run defeat which saw Australia win the series 3–2. His last international tour would be the tri-nation series in Australia where he only scored 68 runs from his six matches.
