= Dipak Patel (New Zealand cricketer) =

New Zealand cricketer

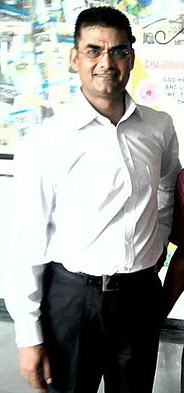

Personal information
- Full name: Dipak Narshibhai Patel
- Born: 25 October 1958 (age 68); Nairobi, Kenya Colony
- Batting: Right-handed
- Bowling: Off-break
- Role: All-rounder
- Relatives: Kaushik Patel (brother)

International information
- National side: New Zealand (1987–1997)
- Test debut (cap 161): 20 February 1987 v West Indies
- Last Test: 17 March 1997 v Sri Lanka
- ODI debut (cap 56): 18 March 1987 v West Indies
- Last ODI: 20 May 1997 v Sri Lanka

Domestic team information
- Years: Team
- 1976–1986: Worcestershire
- 1985/86–1994/95: Auckland

Head coaching information
- Years: Team
- 2014–2017: Papua New Guinea

Career statistics
Competition	Test	ODI	FC	LA
Matches	37	75	358	347
Runs scored	1,200	623	15,188	5,567
Batting average	20.68	11.75	29.95	19.32
100s/50s	0/5	0/1	26/66	1/17
Top score	99	71	204	125
Balls bowled	6,594	3,251	47,767	12,158
Wickets	75	45	654	250
Bowling average	42.05	50.24	33.23	32.99
5 wickets in innings	3	0	27	1
10 wickets in match	0	0	2	0
Best bowling	6/50	3/22	7/46	5/27
Catches/stumpings	15/–	23/–	193/–	102/–
- Source: Cricinfo, 7 February 2017

Dipak Narshibhai Patel (born 25 October 1958) is a Kenyan-born former New Zealand cricketer, who played 37 Test matches and 75 One Day Internationals for the New Zealand cricket team.

Since retiring in 1997, Patel has coached at a provincial (first-class) level in New Zealand, notably for Central Districts and the New Zealand under-19 team.

Patel's brother Kaushik represented Staffordshire from 1994 to 1996; while his cousin Harshad represented Worcestershire in 1985.

== Domestic career ==
A stylish middle order batsman and a right-arm off-break bowler, Patel started playing for Worcestershire in 1976, having moved to England in 1968. He continued to play for them until 1986, playing 236 first-class matches, scoring 9734 runs at 29.23, and taking 357 wickets at 36.66.

In the 1985/86 season, his first playing for Auckland, Patel scored 174 on debut, the highest-ever debut score for the province. In his first two seasons in New Zealand, he scored 1234 runs at 38.56 and took 42 wickets at 26.69, so it was no surprise that he was called up to the Test team.

== International career ==
Ignored by England's national selectors, Patel emigrated to New Zealand in 1986, although he had spent the last six winters in New Zealand, and this enabled him to qualify to play international cricket for New Zealand straight away.

Patel made his Test debut against the West Indies in 1987; he scored 18 and 20, both times being dismissed by Courtney Walsh, and bowled 3 overs. He made his ODI debut in the series that followed. His highest score in Tests came when he was run out for 99 against England in 1992. His best bowling figures of 6 for 50 also came in 1992 against Zimbabwe.

In the 1992 World Cup, Patel was used as an opening bowler, initially against Australia, in an attempt to counteract the tactic of hitting over the in-field during the first 15 overs. This strategy paid off, and he was often used in the same role in other matches.

== Coaching career ==
In July 2014, Patel was appointed head coach of the Papua New Guinea national cricket team. His contract was terminated in July 2017, with Patel stating that the termination was unexpected and came after an extension to December 2017 had been agreed. His tenure saw PNG make its One Day International (ODI) and Twenty20 International (T20I) debuts.

== See also ==
- List of Test cricketers born in non-Test playing nations
