= 1988–89 Australian Tri-Series =

International cricket tournament

1988–89 World Series
- Date: 10 December 1988 – 18 January 1989
- Location: Australia
- Result: Won by West Indies; 2–1 in final series
- Player of the series: Desmond Haynes (Win)
Teams
Australia	Pakistan	West Indies
Captains
Allan Border	Imran Khan	Viv Richards
Most runs
Geoff Marsh (448)	Javed Miandad (320)	Desmond Haynes (513)
Most wickets
Peter Taylor (16)	Wasim Akram (11)	Curtly Ambrose (21)

The 1988–89 World Series was a One Day International (ODI) cricket tri-series where Australia played host to Pakistan and West Indies. Australia and West Indies reached the Finals, which West Indies won 2–1.

== Points table ==
Team	P	W	L	T	NR	Pts	RR
West Indies	8	5	3	0	0	10	4.504
Australia	8	5	3	0	0	10	4.478
Pakistan	8	2	6	0	0	4	4.239

== Uniforms ==
Australia
Australia kit

Pakistan
Pakistan kit

West Indies
West Indies kit

== Result summary ==
10 December 1988
Scorecard

West Indies; 269/9 (47 overs)	v	Pakistan; 180/7 (47 overs)
DL Haynes 111 (107); Abdul Qadir 3/34 (9 overs)		Rameez Raja 69* (127); MD Marshall 4/34 (10 overs)

West Indies won by 89 runs
Adelaide Oval, Adelaide
Umpires: AR Crafter and RJ Evans
Player of the match: DL Haynes (WI)

- Pakistan won the toss and elected to field
- The match was reduced to 47 overs per side.
- Aaqib Javed (PAK) made his ODI debut

11 December 1988
Scorecard

Pakistan; 177 (45.4 overs)	v	Australia; 178/1 (42.2 overs)
Saleem Malik 44 (41); MG Hughes 3/30 (10 overs)		GR Marsh 86* (135)

Australia won by 9 wickets
Adelaide Oval, Adelaide
Umpires: LJ King and TA Prue
Player of the match: MG Hughes (AUS)

- Pakistan won the toss and elected to bat
- The match was reduced to 48 overs per side
- MG Hughes and ME Waugh (both AUS) made their ODI debuts

13 December 1988 (D/N)
Scorecard

West Indies; 220 (48 overs)	v	Australia; 219/8 (50 overs)
DL Haynes 78 (116); MG Hughes 3/48 (10 overs)		DC Boon 71 (120); CA Walsh 2/36 (10 overs)

West Indies won by 1 run
Sydney Cricket Ground, Sydney
Umpires: RJ Evans and PJ McConnell
Player of the match: DL Haynes (WI)

- West Indies won the toss and elected to bat

15 December 1988 (D/N)
Scorecard

West Indies; 236 (49.2 overs)	v	Australia; 202 (47.2 overs)
IVA Richards 58 (74); CJ McDermott 4/38 (9.2 overs)		SR Waugh 54 (67); CEL Ambrose 5/17 (8.2 overs)

West Indies won by 34 runs
Melbourne Cricket Ground, Melbourne
Umpires: RC Bailhache and CD Timmins
Player of the match: CEL Ambrose (WI)

- West Indies won the toss and elected to bat

17 December 1988
Scorecard

West Indies; 244/4 (43 overs)	v	Pakistan; 227/8 (43 overs)
DL Haynes 101 (112); Imran Khan 2/49 (9 overs)		Saleem Malik 68 (63); CA Walsh 2/23 (8 overs)

West Indies won by 17 runs
Bellerive Oval, Hobart
Umpires: SG Randell and CD Timmins
Player of the match: DL Haynes (WI)

- Pakistan won the toss and elected to field
- The match was reduced to 43 overs per side

1 January 1989
Scorecard

Pakistan; 140/9 (50 overs)	v	West Indies; 142/3 (38.2 overs)
Javed Miandad 63* (167); IR Bishop 5/27 (10 overs)		RB Richardson 50* (79); Aaqib Javed 2/33 (10 overs)

West Indies won by 7 wickets
WACA Ground, Perth
Umpires: RC Bailhache and TA Prue
Player of the match: IR Bishop (WI)

- West Indies won the toss and elected to field
- Saeed Anwar (PAK) made his ODI debut

2 January 1989 (D/N)
Scorecard

Pakistan; 216/7 (49 overs)	v	Australia; 178 (46.1 overs)
Aamer Malik 90 (135); CJ McDermott 2/38 (10 overs)		SP O'Donnell 46 (55); Wasim Akram 4/25 (8.1 overs)

Pakistan won by 38 runs
WACA Ground, Perth
Umpires: RJ Evans and PJ McConnell
Player of the match: Aamer Malik (PAK)

- Pakistan won the toss and elected to bat
- The match was reduced to 49 overs per side

5 January 1989 (D/N)
Scorecard

Australia; 226 (47.4 overs)	v	West Indies; 218/8 (48 overs)
GR Marsh 52 (82); CEL Ambrose 3/26 (9 overs)		RB Richardson 63 (81); TM Alderman 3/30 (9 overs)

Australia won by 8 runs
Melbourne Cricket Ground, Melbourne
Umpires: AR Crafter and LJ King
Player of the match: SR Waugh (AUS)

- West Indies won the toss and elected to field
- The match was reduced to 48 overs per side

7 January 1989
Scorecard

Pakistan; 258/7 (50 overs)	v	West Indies; 203 (40.4 overs)
Aamer Malik 75 (119); CEL Ambrose 3/39 (10 overs)		CG Greenidge 46 (79); Wasim Akram 3/27 (7 overs)

Pakistan won by 55 runs
Brisbane Cricket Ground, Woolloongabba, Brisbane
Umpires: RC Bailhache and CD Timmins
Player of the match: Imran Khan (PAK)

- West Indies won the toss and elected to field
- In this match West Indies conceded 59 extras, the joint highest in an ODI.

8 January 1989
Scorecard

Pakistan; 203/9 (50 overs)	v	Australia; 204/5 (44.5 overs)
Javed Miandad 54 (107); TM Alderman 3/27 (9 overs)		DC Boon 45 (64); Aaqib Javed 2/38 (10 overs)

Australia won by 5 wickets
Brisbane Cricket Ground, Woolloongabba, Brisbane
Umpires: LJ King and SG Randell
Player of the match: TM Alderman (AUS)

- Pakistan won the toss and elected to bat

10 January 1989 (D/N)
Scorecard

Australia; 258/4 (43 overs)	v	Pakistan; 108/7 (19 overs)
GR Marsh 125* (121); Tauseef Ahmed 2/43 (7 overs)		Imran Khan 42 (40); AR Border 1/4 (1 overs)

Australia won on faster scoring rate (run rate)
Melbourne Cricket Ground, Melbourne
Umpires: AR Crafter and SG Randell
Player of the match: GR Marsh (AUS)

- Pakistan won the toss and elected to field
- Australia innings was reduced to 43 overs, Pakistan target was 115 runs in 19 overs

12 January 1989 (D/N)
Scorecard

Australia; 215/5 (48 overs)	v	West Indies; 154/8 (48 overs)
DM Jones 77 (132); MD Marshall 2/25 (10 overs)		DL Haynes 58 (80); PL Taylor 3/22 (10 overs)

Australia won by 61 runs
Sydney Cricket Ground, Sydney
Umpires: PJ McConnell and TA Prue
Player of the match: PL Taylor (AUS)

- Australia won the toss and elected to bat
- The match was reduced to 48 overs per side

== Final series ==
West Indies won the best of three final series against Australia 2–1.

14 January 1989 (D/N)
Scorecard

Australia; 204/9 (50 overs)	v	West Indies; 202/9 (50 overs)
AR Border 78 (103); CEL Ambrose 5/26 (10 overs)		IR Bishop 33* (40); TM Alderman 2/29 (10 overs)

Australia won by 2 runs
Melbourne Cricket Ground, Melbourne
Umpires: LJ King and SG Randell

- Australia won the toss and elected to bat

16 January 1989 (D/N)
Scorecard

West Indies; 277/9 (50 overs)	v	Australia; 185 (40 overs)
DL Haynes 62 (68); MG Hughes 4/44 (7 overs)		DC Boon 36 (37); IR Bishop 4/52 (10 overs)

West Indies won by 92 runs
Sydney Cricket Ground, Sydney
Umpires: PJ McConnell and TA Prue

- West Indies won the toss and elected to bat

18 January 1989 (D/N)
Scorecard

Australia; 226/4 (38 overs)	v	West Indies; 111/2 (13.2 overs)
DM Jones 93* (82); IVA Richards 1/12 (3 overs)		IVA Richards 60* (40); TM Alderman 2/22 (4 overs)

West Indies won by 8 wickets (run rate)
Sydney Cricket Ground, Sydney
Umpires: PJ McConnell and TA Prue

- Australia won the toss and elected to bat
- Australia innings was reduced to 38 overs: West Indies target was revised to 108 in 18 overs
- The result of this match led to Australian cricket officials' developing a replacement for the Average Run Rate method: the Most Productive Overs method
