= 1991–92 Australian Tri-Series =

International cricket tournament

1991–92 World Series
- Date: 6 December 1991 – 20 January 1992
- Location: Australia
- Result: Australia won the finals 2-0
- Player of the series: David Boon (Aus)
Teams
Australia	India	West Indies
Captains
Allan Border	Mohammad Azharuddin	Richie Richardson
Most runs
David Boon (432)	Sachin Tendulkar (401)	Desmond Haynes (293)
Most wickets
Craig McDermott (21)	Manoj Prabhakar (12)	Anderson Cummins (10)

The 1991–92 Benson & Hedges World Series was a One Day International (ODI) cricket tri-series where Australia played host to India and West Indies. Australia and India reached the Finals, which Australia won 2–0.

== Points table ==
Pos	Team	P	W	L	NR	T	Points
1	Australia	8	5	2	1	0	11
2	India	8	3	4	0	1	7
3	West Indies	8	2	4	1	1	6

== Uniforms ==
Australia
Australia kit

India
India kit

West Indies
West Indies kit

== Result summary ==
6 December 1991 (D/N)
Scorecard

India; 126 (47.4 overs)	v	West Indies; 126 (41 overs)
Ravi Shastri 33 (110); Curtly Ambrose 2/9 (8.4 overs)		Anderson Cummins 24 (43); Subroto Banerjee 3/30 (10 overs)

Match tied
WACA Ground, Perth
Umpires: Peter McConnell (Aus) and Ric Evans (Aus)

- West Indies won the toss and elected to field.
- Points: India 1, West Indies 1

8 December 1991
Scorecard

India; 208/7 (50 overs)	v	Australia; 101 (37.5 overs)
Kris Srikkanth 60 (60); Steve Waugh 3/46 (10 overs)		Allan Border 32 (45); Ravi Shastri 5/15 (6.5 overs)

India won by 107 runs
WACA Ground, Perth
Umpires: Terry Prue (Aus) and Ric Evans (Aus)
Player of the match: Kris Srikkanth

- India won the toss and elected to bat.
- Points: India 2, Australia 0

10 December 1991
Scorecard

India; 175/8 (50 overs)	v	Australia; 176/2 (50 overs)
Sanjay Manjrekar 57 (99); Craig McDermott 3/19 (10 overs)		David Boon 102 (168); Sanjay Manjrekar 1/2 (0.2 overs)

Australia won by 8 wickets
Bellerive Oval, Hobart
Umpires: Col Timmins (Aus) and Steve Randell (Aus)
Player of the match: David Boon

- India won the toss and elected to bat.
- Points: Australia 2, India 0

12 December 1991 (D/N)
Scorecard

Australia; 173/9 (50 overs)	v	West Indies; 164 (49.1 overs)
Tom Moody 51 (45); Malcolm Marshall 4/18 (10 overs)		Desmond Haynes 62 (107); Craig McDermott 3/23 (9.1 overs)

Australia won by 9 runs
Melbourne Cricket Ground, Melbourne
Umpires: Tony Crafter (Aus) and Peter McConnell (Aus)
Player of the match: Steve Waugh

- Australia won the toss and elected to bat.
- Points: Australia 2, West Indies 0

14 December 1991
Scorecard

India; 262/4 (50 overs)	v	West Indies; 252 (50 overs)
Kris Srikkanth 82 (84); Keith Arthurton 2/23 (4 overs)		Desmond Haynes 89 (116); Kapil Dev 4/54 (10 overs)

India won by 10 runs
Adelaide Oval, Adelaide
Umpires: Leonard King (Aus) and Darrell Hair (Aus)
Player of the match: Kri Srikkanth

- India won the toss and elected to bat.
- Points: India 2, West Indies 0

15 December 1991
Scorecard

India; 157 (50 overs)	v	Australia; 158/4 (40.5 overs)
Kapil Dev 39 (56); Mike Whitney 2/22 (10 overs)		Allan Border 76 (102); Venkatapathy Raju 2/32 (9 overs)

Australia won by 6 wickets
Adelaide Oval, Adelaide
Umpires: Tony Crafter (Aus) and Ian Thomas (Aus)
Player of the match: Allan Border

- India won the toss and elected to bat.
- Points: Australia 2, India 0

18 December 1991 (D/N)
Scorecard

Australia; 234/6 (50 overs)	v	West Indies; 183 (46.5 overs)
Geoff Marsh 82 (146); Curtly Ambrose 2/26 (10 overs)		Carl Hooper 77 (87); Mike Whitney 3/25 (10 overs)

Australia won by 51 runs
Sydney Cricket Ground, Sydney
Umpires: Leonard King (Aus) and Steve Randell (Aus)
Player of the match: Geoff Marsh

- Australia won the toss and elected to bat.
- Points: Australia 2, West Indies 0

9 January 1992 (D/N)
Scorecard

West Indies; 160/7 (47 overs)	v	Australia
Desmond Haynes 56 (107); Craig McDermott 2/25 (9 overs)

No result
Melbourne Cricket Ground, Melbourne
Umpires: Tony Crafter (Aus) and Leonard King (Aus)

- West Indies won the toss and elected to bat.
- Points: West Indies 1, Australia 1

11 January 1992
Scorecard

India; 191 (50 overs)	v	West Indies; 192/4 (48.3 overs)
Sachin Tendulkar 77 (127); Anderson Cummins 5/31 (10 overs)		Richie Richardson 72 (117); Manoj Prabhakar 2/39 (9 overs)

West Indies won by 6 wickets
Brisbane Cricket Ground, Brisbane
Umpires: Darrell Hair (Aus) and Steve Randell (Aus)
Player of the match: Anderson Cummins

- India won the toss and elected to bat.
- Points: West Indies 2, India 0
- Saurav Ganguly made his debut for India

12 January 1992
Scorecard

West Indies; 215 (50 overs)	v	Australia; 203 (49 overs)
Brian Lara 69 (85); Steve Waugh 3/31 (10 overs)		David Boon 77 (115); Patrick Patterson 3/37 (10 overs)

West Indies won by 12 runs
Brisbane Cricket Ground, Brisbane
Umpires: Col Timmins (Aus) and Ian Thomas (Aus)
Player of the match: Brian Lara

- Australia won the toss and elected to field.
- Points: West Indies 2, Australia 0

14 January 1992 (D/N)
Scorecard

India; 175 (50 overs)	v	Australia; 177/1 (39.2 overs)
Kris Srikkanth 42 (56); Craig McDermott 2/17 (10 overs)		Tom Moody 87 (121); Manoj Prabhakar 1/29 (8 overs)

Australia won by 9 wickets
Sydney Cricket Ground, Sydney
Umpires: Col Timmins (Aus) and Ian Thomas (Aus)
Player of the match: Craig McDermott

- India won the toss and elected to bat.
- Points: Australia 2, India 0
- Paul Reiffel made his debut for Australia

16 January 1992 (D/N)
Scorecard

West Indies; 175/8 (50 overs)	v	India; 176/5 (46.4 overs)
Carl Hooper 45 (45); Narendra Hirwani 2/34 (10 overs)		Kris Srikkanth 60 (84); Curtly Ambrose 2/17 (10 overs)

India won by 5 wickets
Melbourne Cricket Ground, Melbourne
Umpires: Peter McConnell (Aus) and Col Timmins (Aus)
Player of the match: Sachin Tendulkar

- West Indies won the toss and elected to field.
- Points: India 2, West Indies 0

== Final series ==
Australia won the best-of-three Final series against India 2–0. David Boon was named players of series.

18 January 1992 (D/N)
Scorecard

Australia; 233/5 (50 overs)	v	India; 145 (42 overs)
David Boon 78 (107); Ravi Shastri 2/38 (10 overs)		Krishnamachari Srikkanth 41 (49); Peter Taylor 2/27 (9 overs)

Australia won by 88 runs
Melbourne Cricket Ground, Melbourne
Umpires: Tony Crafter (Aus) and Terry Prue (Aus)

- Australia won the toss and elected to bat.

20 January 1992 (D/N)
Scorecard

Australia; 208/9 (50 overs)	v	India; 202/7 (50 overs)
Geoff Marsh 78 (136); Manoj Prabhakar 3/31 (9 overs)		Sachin Tendulkar 69 (100); Craig McDermott 2/37 (9 overs)

Australia won by 6 runs
Sydney Cricket Ground, Sydney
Umpires: Peter McConnell (Aus) and Steve Randell (Aus)

- Australia won the toss and elected to bat.
- Australia won the CB series.
