= Indian cricket team in Australia in 1991–92 =

International cricket tour

- Date: 17 November 1991 – 15 March 1992
- Location: Australia
- Result: Australia won the 5-match series 4-0
Teams
- Australia: India
Captains
- (Australia) Allan Border: (India) Mohammad Azharuddin
Most runs
- David Boon (556): Sachin Tendulkar (368)
Most wickets
- Craig McDermott (31): Kapil Dev (25)

The Indian national cricket team toured Australia in the 1991–92 season, just before the 1992 Cricket World Cup. The team was led by Mohammed Azharuddin and played 5 Test matches. Australia won the Test series 4–0. The series is notable from an Indian point of view for Ravi Shastri's double hundred, Sachin Tendulkar's 114 on a bouncy pitch at Perth while the other Indian batsmen struggled, and Kapil Dev becoming the first Indian bowler to take 400 wickets in Tests. The series also saw the debut of Australia's leading Test wicket-taker, Shane Warne.

== Test Series ==
=== First Test ===
29 November–2 December 1991
Scorecard

India	v	Australia
239 (88.1 overs); Manoj Prabhakar 54* (148); Craig McDermott 5/54 (28.1 overs)		340 (127.4 overs); Mark Taylor 94 (230); Kapil Dev 4/80 (34 overs)
156 (58.2 overs); Ravi Shastri 41 (139); Craig McDermott 4/47 (25 overs)		58/0 (24.5 overs); Mark Taylor 35* (88); Manoj Prabhakar 0/3 (2 overs)

Australia won by 10 wickets
Brisbane Cricket Ground, Brisbane
Umpires: Peter McConnell (Aus) and Steve Randell (Aus)
Player of the match: Craig McDermott (Aus)

- Australia won the toss and decided to field.
- Javagal Srinath (Ind) made his Test debut.

=== Second Test ===
26–29 December 1991
Scorecard

India	v	Australia
263 (93.2 overs); Kiran More 67* (134); Bruce Reid 6/66 (26.2 overs)		349 (122 overs); Geoff Marsh 86 (267); Kapil Dev 5/97 (35 overs)
213 (88 overs); Dilip Vengsarkar 54 (180); Bruce Reid 6/60 (29 overs)		128/2 (40 overs); Mark Taylor 60 (121); Venkatapathy Raju 1/17 (6 overs)

Australia won by 8 wickets
Melbourne Cricket Ground, Melbourne
Umpires: Len King (Aus) and Terry Prue (Aus)
Player of the match: Bruce Reid (Aus)

- India won the toss and decided to bat.

=== Third Test ===
2–6 January 1992
Scorecard

Australia	v	India
313 (124 overs); David Boon 129* (361); Subroto Banerjee 3/47 (18 overs)		483 (168.4 overs); Ravi Shastri 206 (477); Craig McDermott 4/147 (51 overs)
173/8 (84 overs); Allan Border 53* (157); Ravi Shastri 4/45 (25 overs)

Match drawn
Sydney Cricket Ground, Sydney
Umpires: Peter McConnell (Aus) and Steve Randell (Aus)
Player of the match: Ravi Shastri (Ind)

- India won the toss and decided to field.
- Shane Warne (Aus) and Subroto Banerjee (Ind) made their Test debuts.

=== Fourth Test ===
25–29 January 1992
Scorecard

Australia	v	India
145 (66.4 overs); Dean Jones 41 (93); Venkatapathy Raju 3/11 (11.4 overs)		225 (84.2 overs); Kapil Dev 56 (83); Craig McDermott 5/76 (31 overs)
451 (186 overs); David Boon 135 (352); Kapil Dev 5/130 (51 overs)		333 (100.1 overs); Mohammad Azharuddin 106 (162); Craig McDermott 5/92 (29.1 overs)

Australia won by 38 runs
Adelaide Oval, Adelaide
Umpires: Darrell Hair (Aus) and Peter McConnell (Aus)
Player of the match: Craig McDermott (Aus)

- India won the toss and decided to field.

=== Fifth Test ===
1–5 February 1992
Scorecard

Australia	v	India
346 (125.5 overs); David Boon 107 (304); Manoj Prabhakar 5/101 (32.5 overs)		272 (89.5 overs); Sachin Tendulkar 114 (161); Mike Whitney 4/68 (23 overs)
367/6d (113.3 overs); Dean Jones 150* (295); Kapil Dev 2/48 (28 overs)		141 (55.1 overs); Kris Srikkanth 38 (116); Mike Whitney 7/27 (12.1 overs)

Australia won by 300 runs
WACA Ground, Perth
Umpires: Tony Crafter (Aus) and Terry Prue (Aus)
Player of the match: Mike Whitney (Aus)

- Australia won the toss and decided to bat.
- Wayne N. Phillips and Paul Reiffel (Aus) made their Test debuts.
- Ian Healy (Aus) passed 1,000 runs in Tests.
- Kapil Dev (Ind) became the second bowler to reached 400 wickets in Tests, after Richard Hadlee (NZ).
- This was Dilip Vengsarkar's last Test match.

== World Series Cup ==
Prior to the Test series, India also competed in the World Series Cup tri-nation One-Day International tournament involving Australia and the West Indies. The West Indies brought a comparatively inexperienced team, having dropped Viv Richards and smarting from the recent retirements of Gordon Greenidge and Jeff Dujon. India won three of their eight round-robin matches and also tied one match against the West Indies. In the best-of-three final with Australia they lost 2–0.
