= 1990–91 Australia Tri-Nation Series =

International cricket tournament

1990–91 World Series
- Date: 29 November 1990 – 15 January 1991
- Location: Australia
- Result: Won by Australia; 2–0 in final series
Teams
Australia	England	New Zealand
Captains
Allan Border	Graham Gooch	Martin Crowe
Most runs
Dean Jones (513)	Alec Stewart (255)	Martin Crowe (405)
Most wickets
Simon O'Donnell (13)	Martin Bicknell (8)	Chris Pringle (18)

The 1990–91 Benson & Hedges World Series was a One Day International (ODI) cricket tri-series where Australia played host to England and New Zealand. Australia and New Zealand reached the Finals, which Australia won 2–0. New Zealand and England contested the tri-series for the first time since the 1982-83 season.

== Points table ==
Pos	Team	P	W	L	NR	T	Points
1	Australia	8	7	1	0	0	14
2	New Zealand	8	3	5	0	0	6
3	England	8	2	6	0	0	4

== Uniforms ==
Australia
Australia kit

England
England kit

New Zealand
New Zealand kit

== Matches ==
29 November 1990 (D/N)
Scorecard

Australia; 9/236 (43.5 overs)	v	New Zealand; 7/174 (40 overs)
Geoff Marsh 46 (78); Chris Pringle 3/39 (9 overs)		Ian Smith 33 (26); Bruce Reid 2/18 (8 overs)

Australia won by 61 runs
Sydney Cricket Ground, Sydney
Umpires: Leonard King and Peter McConnell
Player of the match: Allan Border (AUS)

- New Zealand won the toss and elected to field.
- New Zealand were set a revised target of 236 from 40 overs
- Chris Harris and Richard Petrie (both NZ) made their ODI debut.
- Australia 2 points, New Zealand 0 points.

1 December 1990
Scorecard

New Zealand; 6/199 (40 overs)	v	England; 9/192 (40 overs)
John Wright 67 (88); Gladstone Small 2/25 (7 overs)		John Morris 63* (45); Chris Pringle 3/36 (8 overs)

New Zealand won by 7 runs
Adelaide Oval, Adelaide
Umpires: Ian Thomas and Tony Crafter
Player of the match: John Wright (NZ)

- England won the toss and elected to field.
- Rain originally reduced the innings to 41 overs each
- John Morris (ENG) and Rod Latham (NZ) made their ODI debut.
- New Zealand 2 points, England 0 points

2 December 1990
Scorecard

New Zealand; 208/7 (50 overs)	v	Australia; 210/4 (47 overs)
Martin Crowe 50 (94); Mark Waugh 2/25 (5 overs)		Allan Border 55 (62); Chris Harris 1/26 (7 overs)

Australia won by 6 wickets
Adelaide Oval, Adelaide
Umpires: Ric Evans and Terry Prue
Player of the match: Allan Border (AUS)

- New Zealand won the toss and elected to bat
- Australia 2 points, New Zealand 0 points

7 December 1990
Scorecard

New Zealand; 158 (49.2 overs)	v	England; 161/6 (43.5 overs)
Martin Crowe 37 (67); Chris Lewis 3/26 (9.2 overs)		Wayne Larkins 44 (72); Willie Watson 2/26 (10 overs)

England won by 4 wickets
WACA Ground, Perth
Umpires: Ric Evans and Terry Prue
Player of the match: Alec Stewart (ENG)

- New Zealand won the toss and elected to bat
- Martin Bicknell and Phil Tufnell (both ENG) made their ODI debut
- England 2 points, New Zealand 0 points

9 December 1990
Scorecard

England; 192/9 (50 overs)	v	Australia; 193/4 (41 overs)
Alec Stewart 41 (74); Simon O'Donnell 4/45 (10 overs)		Dean Jones 63* (74); Martin Bicknell 2/55 (9 overs)

Australia won by 6 wickets
WACA Ground, Perth
Umpires: Peter McConnell and Ric Evans
Player of the match: Dean Jones (AUS)

- New Zealand won the toss and elected to bat
- Australia 2 points, England 0 points

11 December 1990
Scorecard

Australia; 263/7 (50 overs)	v	New Zealand; 224/8 (50 overs)
Simon O'Donnell 66 (43); Chris Pringle 2/40 (10 overs)		Martin Crowe 81 (116); Mark Waugh 3/20 (6 overs)

Australia won by 39 runs
Melbourne Cricket Ground, Melbourne
Umpires: Leonard King and Steve Randell
Player of the match: Simon O'Donnell (AUS)

- New Zealand won the toss and elected to field
- Bryan Young (NZ) made his ODI debut
- Australia 2 points, New Zealand 0 points

13 December 1990
Scorecard

England; 194 (46.4 overs)	v	New Zealand; 161 (48.1 overs)
Allan Lamb 72 (110); Chris Pringle 4/35 (8.4 overs)		Martin Crowe 76 (107); Chris Lewis 4/35 (9.1 overs)

England won by 33 runs
Sydney Cricket Ground, Sydney
Umpires: Ian Thomas and Tony Crafter
Player of the match: Allan Lamb (ENG)

- New Zealand won the toss and elected to field
- England 2 points, New Zealand 0 points

15 December 1990
Scorecard

England; 203/6 (50 overs)	v	New Zealand; 204/2 (44.3 overs)
Graham Gooch 48 (87); Richard Petrie 2/32 (10 overs)		Martin Crowe 78 (102); Phil Tufnell 1/43 (10 overs)

New Zealand won by 8 wickets
Gabba, Brisbane
Umpires: Colin Timmins and Steve Randell
Player of the match: Martin Crowe (NZ)

- New Zealand won the toss and elected to field
- New Zealand 2 points, England 0 points

16 December 1990
Scorecard

Australia; 283/5 (50 overs)	v	England; 246/7 (50 overs)
Dean Jones 145 (136); Phil DeFreitas 3/57 (10 overs)		Phil DeFreitas 49 (57); Greg Matthews 3/54 (10 overs)

Australia won by 37 runs
Gabba, Brisbane
Umpires: Leonard King and Tony Crafter
Player of the match: Dean Jones (AUS)

- Australia won the toss and elected to bat
- Australia 2 points, England 0 points

18 December 1990
Scorecard

New Zealand; 194/6 (50 overs)	v	Australia; 193 (50 overs)
Bryan Young 41* (37); Simon O'Donnell 2/50 (10 overs)		Geoff Marsh 61 (94); Chris Harris 2/42 (10 overs)

New Zealand won by 1 run
Bellerive Oval, Hobart
Umpires: Colin Timmins and Steve Randell
Player of the match: Bryan Young (NZ)

- Australia won the toss and elected to field
- New Zealand 2 points, Australia 0 points

1 January 1991
Scorecard

Australia; 221/7 (50 overs)	v	England; 153 (45.5 overs)
Mark Waugh 62 (39); Angus Fraser 3/28 (10 overs)		Wayne Larkins 40 (84); Allan Border 3/24 (9 overs)

Australia won by 68 runs
Sydney Cricket Ground, Sydney
Umpires: Leonard King and Steve Randell
Player of the match: Peter Taylor (AUS)

- England won the toss and elected to field
- Australia 2 points, England 0 points

10 January 1991
Scorecard

Australia; 222/6 (50 overs)	v	England; 219/9 (50 overs)
Steve Waugh 65* (82); Martin Bicknell 2/33 (9.5 overs)		Alec Stewart 55 (65); Mark Waugh 4/37 (10 overs)

Australia won by 3 runs
Melbourne Cricket Ground, Melbourne
Umpires: Leonard King and Ric Evans
Player of the match: Ian Healy (AUS)

- Australia won the toss and elected to bat
- Australia 2 points, England 0 points

== Final series ==
Australia won the best of three final series against New Zealand 2–0.

13 January 1991
Scorecard

New Zealand; 199/7 (50 overs)	v	Australia; 202/4 (49.1 overs)
Andrew Jones 43 (72); Mark Waugh 3/29 (10 overs)		Geoff Marsh 70 (126); Danny Morrison 2/43 (10 overs)

Australia won by 6 wickets
Sydney Cricket Ground, Sydney
Umpires: Leonard King and Ric Evans

- New Zealand won the toss and elected to bat

15 January 1991
Scorecard

New Zealand; 208/6 (50 overs)	v	Australia; 209/3 (45.3 overs)
Richard Reid 64 (94); Simon O'Donnell 3/43 (9 overs)		Dean Jones 76 (105); Andrew Jones 1/28 (6 overs)

Australia won by 7 wickets
Melbourne Cricket Ground, Melbourne
Umpires: Peter McConnell and Tony Crafter

- New Zealand won the toss and elected to bat
