= 1989–90 Australian Tri-Series =

International cricket tournament

1989–90 World Series
- Date: 26 December 1989 – 20 February 1990
- Location: Australia
- Result: Won by Australia; 2–0 in final series
Teams
Australia	Pakistan	Sri Lanka
Captains
Allan Border	Imran Khan	Arjuna Ranatunga
Most runs
Dean Jones (461)	Saeed Anwar (293)	Arjuna Ranatunga (273)
Most wickets
Simon O'Donnell (20)	Waqar Younis (9)	Rumesh Ratnayake (6)

The 1989–90 World Series was a One Day International (ODI) cricket tri-series where Australia played host to Pakistan and Sri Lanka. Australia and Pakistan reached the Finals, which Australia won 2–0. Sri Lanka wore royal blue for the first time in Australia.

== Uniforms ==
Australia
Australia kit

Pakistan
Pakistan kit

Sri Lanka
Sri Lanka kit

== Points table ==
Team	P	W	L	NR	T	Pts	RR
1	Australia	8	6	2	0	0	12	4.455
2	Pakistan	8	5	3	0	0	10	4.538
3	Sri Lanka	8	1	7	0	0	2	4.198

== Result summary ==
26 December 1989
Scorecard

Australia; 228/5 (48.5 overs)	v	Sri Lanka; 198 (47.2 overs)
DM Jones 85* (89); A Ranatunga 3/41 (10 overs)		A Ranatunga 55 (70); SP O'Donnell 4/36 (9 overs)

Australia won by 30 runs
Melbourne Cricket Ground, Melbourne
Umpires: LJ King and CD TImmins
Player of the match: SP O'Donnell (AUS)

- Sri Lanka won the toss and elected to field
- The match was reduced to 48.5 overs per side.
- GD Campbell and MA Taylor (both AUS) and ST Jayasuriya (SL) made their ODI debuts
- The 2nd limited overs international to be played on Boxing Day overall, and the 1st limited overs international to be played on Boxing Day since 1979.

30 December 1989 (D/N)
Scorecard

Sri Lanka; 203/9 (48 overs)	v	Australia; 204/1 (38.5 overs)
A Ranatunga 71* (106); TM Alderman 3/25 (10 overs)		GR Marsh 80* (136); KIW Wijegunawardene 1/33 (7 overs)

Australia won by 9 wickets
WACA Ground, Perth
Umpires: AR Crafter and RJ Evans
Player of the match: GR Marsh (AUS)

- Sri Lanka won the toss and elected to bat
- The match was reduced to 48 overs per side

31 December 1989 (D/N)
Scorecard

Pakistan; 222/7 (47 overs)	v	Sri Lanka; 223/7 (45.3 overs)
Aamer Malik 69 (116); JR Ratnayeke 2/33 (10 overs)		MAR Samarasekera 60 (86); Wasim Akram 2/37 (10 overs)

Sri Lanka won by 3 wickets
WACA Ground, Perth
Umpires: AR Crafter and PJ McConnell
Player of the match: MAR Samarasekera (SL)

- Pakistan won the toss and elected to bat
- The match was reduced to 47 overs per side

3 January 1990 (D/N)
Scorecard

Pakistan; 161 (50 overs)	v	Australia; 162/3 (41 overs)
Imran Khan 39 (62); CG Rackemann 3/21 (10 overs)		AR Border 69* (103); Wasim Akram 1/24 (10 overs)

Australia won by 7 wickets
Melbourne Cricket Ground, Melbourne
Umpires: LJ King and SG Randell
Player of the match: AR Border (AUS)

- Pakistan won the toss and elected to bat
- Maqsood Rana and Nadeem Ghauri (both PAK) made their ODI debuts

4 January 1990 (D/N)
Scorecard

Australia; 202/7 (50 overs)	v	Sri Lanka; 129 (41 overs)
DM Jones 69 (98); RJ Ratnayake 3/44 (10 overs)		A Ranatunga 39 (62); TM Alderman 3/29 (9 overs)

Australia won by 73 runs
Melbourne Cricket Ground, Melbourne
Umpires: SG Randell and CD Timmins
Player of the match: DM Jones (AUS)

- Australia won the toss and elected to bat

10 February 1990
Scorecard

Sri Lanka; 253/5 (50 overs)	v	Pakistan; 254/5 (47 overs)
AP Gurusinha 88 (108); Tauseef Ahmed 2/48 (10 overs)		Ijaz Ahmed 102* (100); CPH Ramanayake 1/25 (5.2 overs)

Pakistan won by 5 wickets
Brisbane Cricket Ground, Woolloongabba, Brisbane
Umpires: RJ Evans and CD Timmins
Player of the match: Ijaz Ahmed (PAK)

- Pakistan won the toss and elected to field

11 February 1990
Scorecard

Australia; 300/5 (50 overs)	v	Pakistan; 233 (39.1 overs)
TM Moody 89 (82); Mushtaq Ahmed 2/76 (10 overs)		Imran Khan 82 (89); CG Rackemann 4/44 (8.1 overs)

Australia won by 67 runs
Brisbane Cricket Ground, Woolloongabba, Brisbane
Umpires: RJ Evans and TA Prue
Player of the match: TM Moody (AUS)

- Pakistan won the toss and elected to field

13 February 1990 (D/N)
Scorecard

Australia; 165/8 (50 overs)	v	Pakistan; 167/5 (48.3 overs)
DM Jones 54 (88); Wasim Akram 2/21 (10 overs)		Imran Khan 56* (106); SP O'Donnell 2/32 (9.3 overs)

Pakistan won by 5 wickets
Sydney Cricket Ground, Sydney
Umpires: RJ Evans and TA Prue
Player of the match: Imran Khan (PAK)

- Pakistan won the toss and elected to field

15 February 1990
Scorecard

Sri Lanka; 195 (47.5 overs)	v	Pakistan; 198/4 (48.3 overs)
AP Gurusinha 59 (84); Waqar Younis 4/39 (10 overs)		Rameez Raja 116* (148); KIW Wijegunawardene 2/34 (10 overs)

Pakistan won by 6 wickets
Bellerive Oval, Hobart
Umpires: LJ King and SG Randell
Player of the match: Rameez Raja (PAK)

- Pakistan won the toss and elected to field

17 February 1990
Scorecard

Pakistan; 315/3 (50 overs)	v	Sri Lanka; 288/8 (50 overs)
Saeed Anwar 126 (99); EAR de Silva 2/57 (9 overs)		RS Mahanama 72 (79); Waqar Younis 2/35 (10 overs)

Pakistan won by 27 runs
Adelaide Oval, Adelaide
Umpires: AR Crafter and SG Randell
Player of the match: Saeed Anwar (PAK)

- Sri Lanka won the toss and elected to field

18 February 1990
Scorecard

Sri Lanka; 158 (40.4 overs)	v	Australia; 159/3 (40 overs)
PA de Silva 39 (29); GD Campbell 3/31 (7 overs)		DM Jones 80* (120); AP Gurusinha 1/16 (7 overs)

Australia won by 7 wickets
Adelaide Oval, Adelaide
Umpires: AR Crafter and PJ McConnell
Player of the match: DM Jones (AUS)

- Sri Lanka won the toss and elected to bat

20 February 1990 (D/N)
Scorecard

Pakistan; 220/8 (49 overs)	v	Australia; 218/9 (49 overs)
Saleem Malik 67 (85); SP O'Donnell 2/32 (10 overs)		TM Moody 74 (109); Imran Khan 2/28 (7 overs)

Pakistan won by 2 runs
Sydney Cricket Ground, Sydney
Umpires: LJ King and PJ McConnell
Player of the match: SP O'Donnell (AUS)

- Pakistan won the toss and elected to bat
- The match was reduced to 49 overs per side

== Final series ==
Australia won the best of three final series against Pakistan 2–0.

23 February 1990 (D/N)
Scorecard

Pakistan; 162 (47.5 overs)	v	Australia; 163/3 (45.5 overs)
Wasim Akram 86 (76); GD Campbell 3/39 (9 overs)		DM Jones 83* (135); Wasim Akram 2/30 (10 overs)

Australia won by 7 wickets
Melbourne Cricket Ground, Melbourne
Umpires: AR Crafter and PJ McConnell

- Australia won the toss and elected to field

25 February 1990
Scorecard

Australia; 255/6 (50 overs)	v	Pakistan; 186 (45 overs)
MA Taylor 76 (116); Mushtaq Ahmed 2/65 (10 overs)		Saleem Yousuf 59 (75); SP O'Donnell 3/38 (6 overs)

Australia won by 69 runs
Sydney Cricket Ground, Sydney
Umpires: AR Crafter and PJ McConnell
Player of the match: DM Jones (AUS)

- Australia won the toss and elected to bat
