= West Indian cricket team in Australia in 1988–89 =

International cricket tour

The Frank Worrell Trophy 1988-89
- Date: November 1988-February 1989
- Location: Australia
- Result: West Indies won the 5-test series 3-1
Teams
- Australia: West Indies
Captains
- (Australia) Allan Border: (Cricket West Indies) Vivian Richards
Most runs
- David Boon (397) Steve Waugh (331) Allan Border (258): Desmond Haynes (537); Richie Richardson (528); Vivian Richards (446)
Most wickets
- Merv Hughes (14) Allan Border (11): Curtly Ambrose (26); Malcolm Marshall (17)

The West Indies cricket team toured Australia from November 1988 to February 1989 and played 5 Test matches against Australia. West Indies won the series 3–1 with one match drawn.

In addition, the teams played in a triangular Limited Overs International (LOI) tournament which also includes Pakistan. The West Indies won this tournament after defeating Australia in best of 3-finals by 2–1.

== Test series summary ==
=== 1st Test ===
18–21 November 1988 (Note: While five days of play were scheduled for each Test, the first Test reached a result in four days.)
Scorecard

Australia	v	West Indies
167 (69.3 overs); Mike Veletta 37 (107); Courtney Walsh 4/62 (18.3 overs)		394 (113.4 overs); Richie Richardson 81 (194); Tim May 3/90 (29 overs)
289 (86.1 overs); Steve Waugh 90 (167); Malcolm Marshall 4/92 (26 overs)		1/63 (19.1 overs); Desmond Haynes 30* (47); Tony Dodemaide 1/15 (5.2 overs)

West Indies won by 9 wickets
The Gabba, Brisbane
Umpires: Tony Crafter and Peter McConnell
Player of the match: Curtly Ambrose (WI)

- Australia won the toss and elected to bat.
- After this, Australia did not lose a test match at the Gabba for 32 years

=== 2nd Test ===
2–6 December 1988
Scorecard

West Indies	v	Australia
449 (123.1 overs); Viv Richards 146 (150); Merv Hughes 5/130 (36.1 overs)		8/395d (100.3 overs); Graeme Wood 111 (243); Curtly Ambrose 5/72 (23.3 overs)
9/349d (98 overs); Desmond Haynes 100 (286); Merv Hughes 8/87 (37 overs)		234 (63 overs); Ian Healy 52 (123); Curtly Ambrose 3/66 (17 overs)

West Indies won by 169 runs
WACA Ground, Perth
Umpires: Robin Bailhache and Terry Prue
Player of the match: Merv Hughes (Aus)

- Australia won the toss and elected to field.
- Merv Hughes became the only bowler in Test history to take a hat-trick across three separate overs. Taking wickets on the final ball of his 36th over and the first ball of his 37th over in the first innings; and on the first ball of his first over in the second innings.

=== 3rd Test ===
24–29 December 1988
Scorecard

West Indies	v	Australia
280 (93.1 overs); Gordon Greenidge 49 (83); Terry Alderman 4/68 (32.1 overs)		242 (94.3 overs); Steve Waugh 42 (105); Patrick Patterson 4/49 (20 overs)
9/361d (120 overs); Richie Richardson 122 (287); Steve Waugh 5/92 (24 overs)		114 (57.1 overs); David Boon 20 (26); Allan Border 20 (111); Patrick Patterson 5/39 (15.1 overs)

West Indies won by 285 runs
Melbourne Cricket Ground, Melbourne
Umpires: Tony Crafter and Peter McConnell
Player of the match: Curtly Ambrose (WI)

- Australia won the toss and elected to field.
- 25 December was taken as a rest day.

=== 4th Test ===
26–30 January 1989
Scorecard

West Indies	v	Australia
224 (99.2 overs); Desmond Haynes 75 (217); Allan Border 7/46 (26 overs)		401 (191.5 overs); David Boon 149 (425); Malcolm Marshall 5/29 (31 overs)
256 (104.4 overs); Desmond Haynes 143 (272); Allan Border 4/50 (18.4 overs)		3/82 (35.3 overs); Dean Jones 24* (85); Viv Richards 1/12 (7 overs)

Australia won by 7 wickets
Sydney Cricket Ground, Sydney
Umpires: Len King and Terry Prue
Player of the match: Allan Border (Aus)

- West Indies won the toss and elected to bat.
- Trevor Hohns and Mark Taylor (both Aus) made their Test debuts.
- After taking just 16 wickets in his first 100 Test matches, Allan Border takes 11 for 96, including 7 for 46 on the first day.

=== 5th Test ===
3–7 February 1989
Scorecard

Australia	v	West Indies
515 (140.5 overs); Dean Jones 216 (347); Curtly Ambrose 3/93 (26 overs)		369 (121.4 overs); Richie Richardson 106 (160); Mike Whitney 7/89 (30 overs)
4/224d (75 overs); Geoff Marsh 79 (172); Curtly Ambrose 1/44 (15 overs)		4/233 (81 overs); Gordon Greenidge 104 (249); Mike Whitney 2/60 (20 overs)

Match drawn
Adelaide Oval, Adelaide
Umpires: Ric Evans and Peter McConnell
Player of the match: Dean Jones (Aus)

- Australia won the toss and elected to bat.

== Benson & Hedges World Series ==
The Benson & Hedges World Series Cup was a tri-nation (ODI) series held in Australia from 10 December 1988 till 18 January 1989. It was held between Australia, West Indies, Pakistan. The tournament was played in Round-robin format in which Australia and West Indies reached the finals where West Indies won the best of 3-finals series by 2–1.

Desmond Haynes topped the batting list in the tournament with 513 runs (11 innings) at an average of 51.30, While Curtly Ambrose topped the bowling list with 21 wickets (10 innings) at an average of 15.90

== External sources ==
- CricketArchive
