= Lilac Hill Park =

Cricket ground in Perth, Western Australia

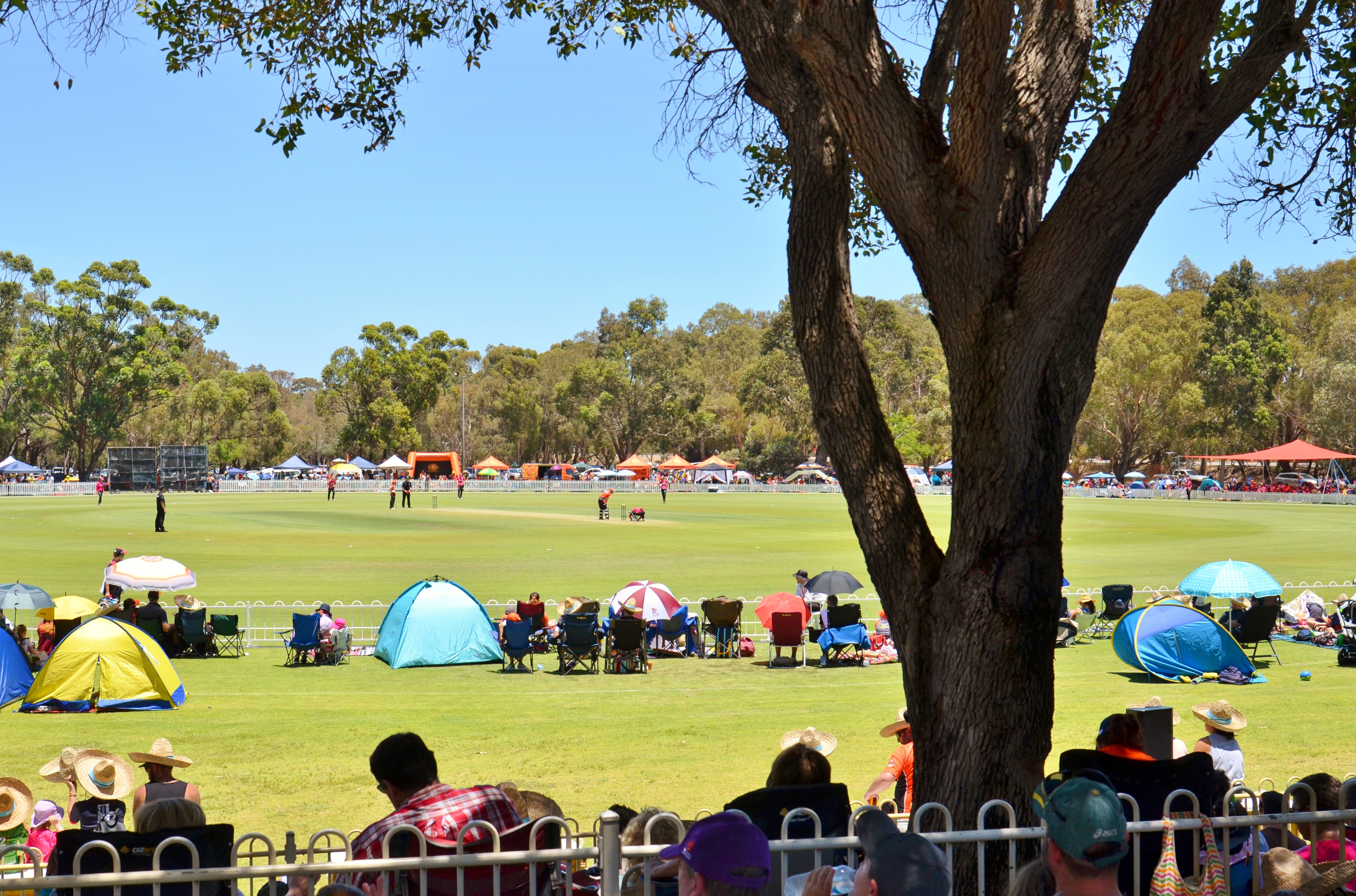
- Perth Scorchers v Sydney Sixers, 2017
- Interactive map of Lilac Hill Park

Ground information
- Location: Caversham, Western Australia
- Country: Australia
- Coordinates: 31°53′29.7″S 115°58′24.3″E
- Establishment: 1981
- Capacity: 12,000
- Owner: Midland-Guildford Cricket Club; Swan Athletic/Caversham Cricket Club
- End names
- Pavilion End; River End

International information
- Only women's ODI: 10 March 2005: Australia v New Zealand

Team information
| Midland-Guildford | (1981–) |
| ACB/CA Chairman's XI | (1990–2010) |
- As of 1 September 2020; Source: ESPNcricinfo

Lilac Hill is a cricket ground in Western Australia in the Perth suburb of Caversham. The Swan River flows around its southern and eastern sides. The ends of the ground are known as the River End and the Pavilion End.

In 1990, the West Australian Cricket Association (WACA) hosted a festival match at the ground, with a Cricket Australia's Chairman's XI playing the touring English XI. Beginning with that match, the WACA has hosted an annual international tour opening match at Lilac Hill between a Chairman's XI and the visiting international cricket team. The inaugural 1990 match set an attendance record of 12,000, and subsequent years also attracted good crowds.

Continuation of the match eventually came into question due to the full schedule of touring teams. In 2006, the format of the match was changed slightly to an "Invitational XI" v the Chairman's XI. In 2010, it was announced that the match would no longer be held, due to increased constraints of international cricket scheduling.

== Lilac Hill Festival cricket match results ==
25 October 1990
Report

| WACA President's XI (Western Australia); 7/205 (47 overs) | v | England XI; 4/206 (40 overs) |
| Tom Moody 100 (109); Chris Mack 2/29 (7 overs) | | Alec Stewart 70 (75); Chris Lewis 3/37 (9 overs) |

England XI won by 6 wickets
Lilac Hill, Perth
Umpires: Terry Prue and Barry Rennie
Player of the match: Tom Moody (WACA President's XI)

- WACA President's XI won the toss and elected to bat.
- England XI failed to complete 50 overs in the allocated 3.5 hours and the match was reduced to 47 overs per side

17 November 1991
Report

| ACB Chairman's XI (Australia); 6/254 (50 overs) | v | (India) Indians; 7/225 (50 overs) |
| Geoff Marsh 106; Damien Martyn 3/26 (6 overs) | | Dilip Vengsarkar 58; Javagal Srinath 3/56 (10 overs) |

(Australia) ACB Chairman's XI won by 29 runs
Lilac Hill, Perth
Umpires: Ross Emerson and Peter McConnell
Player of the match: Geoff Marsh (ACB Chairman's XI)

- Indians won the toss and elected to field.

2 November 1992
Report

| ACB Chairman's XI (Australia); 9/209 (50 overs) | v | (Cricket West Indies) West Indians; 3/210 (44.2 overs) |
| Geoff Marsh 72 (122); Dennis Lillee 2/18 (10 overs) | | Brian Lara 106 (132); Carl Hooper 3/42 (10 overs) |

(Cricket West Indies) West Indians won by 7 wickets
Lilac Hill, Perth
Umpires: D Elstone and Ric Evans
Player of the match: Brian Lara (West Indians)

- ACB Chairman's XI won the toss and elected to bat.
- The match commenced 16 minutes late (West Indians team bus delayed)

19 October 1993
Report

| ACB Chairman's XI (Australia); 4/192 (43.2 overs) | v | (New Zealand) New Zealanders; 189 (47.4 overs) |
| Damien Martyn 81 (98); Dennis Lillee 2/25 (10 overs) | | Blair Pocock 68 (122); Dipak Patel 3/37 (10 overs) |

(Australia) ACB Chairman's XI won by 6 wickets
Lilac Hill, Perth
Umpires: Ross Emerson and C Reynolds
Player of the match: Damien Martyn (ACB Chairman's XI)

- ACB Chairman's XI won the toss and elected to field.
- Langer retired hurt at 16/0 (struck below elbow by a delivery from Cairns).

25 October 1994
Report

| ACB Chairman's XI (Australia); 232 (49.4 overs) | v | England XI; 3/236 (47.2 overs) |
| Ricky Ponting 82 (82); Dennis Lillee 2/32 (10 overs) | | Graham Gooch 129 (130); Darren Gough 5/32 (9.4 overs) |

England XI won by 7 wickets
Lilac Hill, Perth
Umpires: G Bibby and Ric Evans
Player of the match: Graham Gooch (England XI)

- ACB Chairman's XI won the toss and elected to bat.

26 October 1995
Report

| ACB Chairman's XI (Australia); 207 (49.5 overs) | v | (Pakistan) Pakistanis; 210 (50 overs) |
| Justin Langer 85; Jo Angel 5/40 (10 overs) | | Ramiz Raja 106; Waqar Younis 2/38 (9.5 overs) |

(Pakistan) Pakistanis won by 3 runs
Lilac Hill, Perth
Umpires: Ric Evans and Barry Rennie
Player of the match: Ramiz Raja (Pakistanis)

- ACB Chairman's XI won the toss and elected to field.
- Only 1 run was debited for each no-ball delivered (in contrast to the other non-international matches in Australia in 1995/96, which had 2 runs debited for each no-ball bowled)

4 November 1996
Report

| ACB Chairman's XI (Australia); 7/258 (42 overs) | v | (Cricket West Indies) West Indians; 9/256 (50 overs) |
| Brendon Julian 96 (52); Brendon Julian 3/33 (8 overs) | | Brian Lara 66 (65); Ian Bishop 4/44 (10 overs) |

(Australia) ACB Chairman's XI won by 3 wickets
Lilac Hill, Perth
Umpires: Terry Prue and Keith Rinaldi
Player of the match: Brendon Julian (ACB Chairman's XI)

- West Indians won the toss and elected to bat.

25 November 1997
Report

| ACB Chairman's XI (Australia); 7/251 (50 overs) | v | (South Africa) South Africans; 5/282 (50 overs) |
| Michael Hussey 62 (84); Tom Moody 2/50 (10 overs) | | Daryll Cullinan 101 (110); Jacques Kallis 2/22 (4 overs) |

(South Africa) South Africans won by 31 runs
Lilac Hill, Perth
Umpires: Barry Rennie and Keith Rinaldi
Player of the match: Daryll Cullinan (South Africans)

- South Africans won the toss and elected to bat.
- Ryan Campbell withdrew from the selected team with an injury. Mark Atkinson was brought into the team as his replacement. He would bowl but not bat.
  Brendon Julian broke down after 3 deliveries with a groin injury. Hansie Cronje substituted in the field for Julian while Simon Katich was located. When found Katich took his place in the team and he was allowed to bat - in the social spirit of the game.

29 October 1998
Report

| ACB Chairman's XI (Australia); 296 (50 overs) | v | England XI; 5/297 (50 overs) |
| Ryan Campbell 74; Matthew Nicholson 2/46 (10 overs) | | Mike Atherton 88; Alex Tudor 3/62 (10 overs) |

England XI won by 1 run
Lilac Hill, Perth
Umpires: Ross Emerson and Randolph Woolridge
Player of the match: Mike Atherton (England XI)

- ACB Chairman's XI won the toss and elected to field.

26 October 1999
Report

| ACB Chairman's XI (Australia); 3/171 (23.3 overs) | v | (Pakistan) Pakistanis; 168 (44 overs) |
| Ryan Campbell 103 (58); Dennis Lillee 3/8 (8 overs) | | Moin Khan 60 (62); Mushtaq Ahmed 2/44 (3.3 overs) |

(Australia) ACB Chairman's XI won by 7 wickets
Lilac Hill, Perth
Umpires: Craig Allen and Keith Rinaldi
Player of the match: Ryan Campbell (ACB Chairman's XI)

- Pakistanis won the toss and elected to bat.

7 November 2000
Report

| ACB Chairman's XI (Australia) | v | (Cricket West Indies) West Indians; 2/276 (50 overs) |
| Steve Nikitaras 1/42 (9 overs) | | Sherwin Campbell 111 (139) |

No result
Lilac Hill, Perth
Umpires: Andrew Craig and Keith Rinaldi

- ACB Chairman's XI won the toss and elected to field.
- Heavy rain during the lunch break caused play to be abandoned.

5 December 2001
Report

| ACB Chairman's XI (Australia); 209 (44.1 overs) | v | (South Africa) South Africans; 9/257 (50 overs) |
| Mike Hussey 56 (77); Andy Bichel 3/28 (8 overs) | | Neil McKenzie 76 (84); Steve Elworthy 4/27 (7.1 overs) |

(South Africa) South Africans won by 48 runs
Lilac Hill, Perth
Umpires: Bruce Bennett and Jeff Brookes
Player of the match: Steve Elworthy (South Africans)

- South Africans won the toss and elected to bat.

22 October 2002
Report

| ACB Chairman's XI (Australia); 7/301 (50 overs) | v | England XI; 243 (48.5 overs) |
| Kade Harvey 114 (88); Brad Hogg 5/33 (8.5 overs) | | Rob Key 68 (71); Simon Jones 2/53 (8 overs) |

(Australia) ACB Chairman's XI won by 58 runs
Lilac Hill, Perth
Umpires: Bruce Bennett and Andrew Craig
Player of the match: Kade Harvey (ACB Chairman's XI)

- England XI won the toss and elected to field.

1 October 2003
Report

| CA Chairman's XI (Australia); 240 (49.5 overs) | v | (Zimbabwe) Zimbabweans; 3/241 (41.2 overs) |
| Ryan Campbell 65 (79); Brad Williams 1/32 (9 overs) | | Stuart Carlisle 89 (95); Heath Streak 4/33 (9.5 overs) |

Zimbabwe won by 7 wickets
Lilac Hill, Perth
Umpires: Jeff Brookes and Ian Lock
Player of the match: Heath Streak (Zimbabweans)

- CA Chairman's XI won the toss and elected to bat.

7 December 2004
Report

| CA Chairman's XI (Australia); 213 (45.2 overs) | v | (Pakistan) Pakistanis; 9/256 (50 overs) |
| Chris Rogers 61 (59); Michael Hussey 3/28 (4 overs) | | Salman Butt 115 (135); Naved-ul-Hasan 3/36 (10 overs) |

(Pakistan) Pakistanis won by 43 runs
Lilac Hill, Perth
Umpires: Bruce Bennett and Ian Lock
Player of the match: Salman Butt (Pakistanis)

- Pakistanis won the toss and elected to bat.

9 December 2005
Report

| CA Chairman's XI (Australia); 9/192 (46 overs) | v | (South Africa) South Africans; 2/193 (35.2 overs) |
| Marcus North 41 (63); Mathew Inness 2/47 (8 overs) | | Herschelle Gibbs 91 (86); Garnett Kruger 4/33 (8 overs) |

(South Africa) South Africans won by 8 wickets
Lilac Hill, Perth
Umpires: Andrew Craig and Ian Lock
Player of the match: Herschelle Gibbs (South Africans)

- South Africans won the toss and elected to field.
- South Africans were only able to bowl 46 overs in the allocated time.

8 December 2006
Report

| CA Chairman's XI (Australia); 3/260 (40.1 overs) | v | England XI; 8/259 (50 overs) |
| Luke Ronchi 89 (49); Chris Matthews 3/38 (7 overs) | | Alec Stewart 69 (69); Monty Panesar 2/63 (10 overs) |

(Australia) CA Chairman's XI won by 7 wickets
Lilac Hill, Perth
Umpires: Peter Loader and Donald Weser
Player of the match: Luke Ronchi (CA Chairman's XI)

- England XI won the toss and elected to bat.

7 December 2007
Report

| CA Chairman's XI (Australia); 285 (47 overs) | v | (New Zealand) New Zealanders; 9/278 (50 overs) |
| Luke Pomersbach 88 (65); David Hussey 2/23 (5 overs) | | Brendon McCullum 119 (126); Jacob Oram 3/41 (7 overs) |

(Australia) CA Chairman's XI won by 7 runs
Lilac Hill, Perth
Umpires: Ian Lock and Mick Martell
Player of the match: Brendon McCullum (New Zealanders)

- New Zealanders won the toss and elected to field.

28 November 2008
Report

| CA Chairman's XI (Australia); 169 (20 overs) | v | (Western Australia) WACA President's XI; 2/178 (18.5 overs) |
| Luke Pomersbach 41 (21); Liam Davis 3/25 (3 overs) | | Liam Davis 86 (49); Andrew Jarman 1/3 (1 over) |

(Western Australia) WACA President's XI won by 8 wickets
Lilac Hill, Perth
Umpires: Dean Chamberlain and Adam Semple
Player of the match: Liam Davis (WACA President's XI)

- WACA President's XI won the toss and elected to field.
- This would be the last Lilac Hill festival match.
  Format for festival match was a T20 limited overs match.

== Other matches ==
| Date | Teams | Result |
|---|---|---|
| 14 September 1997 | Western Australia Invitational XI v Transvaal | (two-day match) WA XI won by 6 wickets |
| 16 September 2000 | Western Australia XI v KwaZulu-Natal | (12 per side) Match abandoned |
| 17 September 2000 | Western Australia XI v KwaZulu-Natal | (12 per side) Match tied |
| 19 September 2000 | Western Australia XI v KwaZulu-Natal | (two-day match) Match drawn |
| 10 March 2005 | Rose Bowl 2004/05 (1st ODI) Australia Women v New Zealand Women | Australia Women won by 87 runs |
| 28 November 2008 | Victorian Bushrangers v Retravision Warriors | Retravision Warriors won by 8 wickets |
| 13-15 November 2025 | England Lions cricket team v England XI | England XI won by 5 wickets. The Lions were on a development tour at the same time as the main England team were preparing for 2025–26 Ashes series and this inter-squad match was arranged as part of the Ashes warm up. This match did not have First Class status due to use of multiple players beyond the 11 per team standard. England Lions scored 367 with Rehan Ahmed scoring 90 and Ben Stokes taking 6 wickets. England responded with 426 as Ollie Pope scored 100. The Lions declared their 2nd innings at 251/6 to set England a chase of 202. England won by chasing down the target in 34.4 overs for the loss of 5 wickets. Pope scored the most runs in the game with 90 in the second innings to go with his century in the first. |

== Perth Scorchers women's team ==
In recent times, Perth Scorchers women's cricket team have played two Women's Big Bash League (WBBL) matches on consecutive days, Saturday and Sunday, during the season. This is now known as the Lilac Hill Weekend.

The Scorchers first played at Lilac Hill in the second season of the WBBL versus Adelaide Strikers on Friday 13 January 2017. A match the Scorchers won. Over time it has become their secondary ground for home games after the WACA Ground.

For these matches at Lilac Hill, entry has been free with free rides and activities for kids. Fans are encouraged to bring their dogs down to the ground. This is with the goal to set a new record in dog attendance at a match. The Lilac Hill Festival Weekend received the highest fan experience score across the League in 2020.

== Other uses ==
Lilac Hill is the home ground for the local 1st grade cricket teams, Midland-Guildford Cricket Club and Swan Athletic/Caversham Cricket Club and is also used for hockey and is the home ground of the Old Guildford Mundaring Hockey Club.

== General references ==
- The Home of CricketArchive
- "Cricketarchive match results".
