= John Newbery (cricket) =

English cricket bat maker

John Leonard Newbery was an English cricket bat maker and founder of the Newbery cricket equipment brand. He was associated with the Robertsbridge bat-making tradition in East Sussex, a historic centre of cricket bat manufacturing in England.

In 1981, Newbery founded John Newbery Ltd, producing handcrafted cricket bats and cricket equipment. The company became known for combining traditional English willow bat-making techniques with experimental bat designs.

Newbery died on 13 July 1989 at the age of 50, less than a decade after founding the company.

== Early life and career ==
Newbery is the son of bat maker Len Newbery, who worked within the cricket bat manufacturing industry in Sussex. The Robertsbridge area has long been associated with cricket bat production, with several manufacturers operating there during the twentieth century.

In 1981 he established his own bat-making company, John Newbery Ltd, continuing the family tradition of cricket bat manufacture.

== Bat design and innovations ==
Newbery became known for experimenting with alternative bat shapes and weight distribution. Among the designs associated with the brand was the Excalibur cricket bat, which featured a particular profile, with the shoulders of the blade shaved away. The bat gained wider attention when it was used by New Zealand cricketer Lance Cairns during international matches in the early 1980s. Cairns used the bat during the 1982–83 World Series Cup finals in Melbourne, where he struck multiple sixes during a rapid half-century.

Newbery's work formed part of a broader evolution in cricket bat design during the late twentieth century as manufacturers experimented with thicker edges and larger sweet spots.

=== Context within bat design history ===
Experimental cricket bat designs emerged periodically during the twentieth century as manufacturers sought to improve power and balance within the laws of the game. Earlier examples included bats with altered blade profiles, reinforced handles and modified weight distribution.

Newbery's designs formed part of this wider experimentation in cricket equipment during the late twentieth century, when bat makers increasingly explored thicker edges and redistributed mass to maximise performance.

== Brand activities ==
The Newbery company regards itself as part of the group of English cricket bat makers, associated with the Sussex bat‑making tradition. The Newbery brand continues to produce cricket equipment including bats, balls and clothing.
