= Australian Tri-Series =

Cricket tournament held in Australia

- Administrator: Cricket Australia
- Format: One Day International (1979–2015)
- First edition: 1979–80
- Latest edition: 2014–15
- Tournament format: Triangular round robin followed by a best of three final
- Number of teams: Australia; England; West Indies; India; Pakistan; New Zealand; Sri Lanka; South Africa; Zimbabwe
- Current champion: Australia (20th title)
- Most successful: Australia (20 titles)
- TV: Fox Cricket

The Australian Tri-Series was an annual one day international (ODI) cricket tournament held in Australia, and contested by Australia and two touring teams.

The series was the primary format for international one-day cricket throughout most of the early history of ODI cricket in Australia, staged during the height of the Australian cricket season, in the summer months of December, January and February. The tri-series was first held in 1979–80 and was contested every season until 2007–08. It has since been held only twice since 2007–08, and ODI cricket has since been played as bilateral ODI series against a single touring opponent.

== History ==
The concept of a three-team international series known as a 'tri-series' in cricket originated with the World Series Cricket program sponsored by Kerry Packer. Packer was keen to exploit what he saw as strong interest in ODI cricket, and staged long tri-series amongst teams from Australia, West Indies, and The Rest of the World in the 1977–78 and 1978–79 seasons. These tournaments have never been awarded either One Day International or List A status.

When the World Series Cricket schism ended in 1979–80, the tri-series format was retained. Throughout its existence, the tournament was held as a series of One Day Internationals, featuring a round-robin played amongst the three teams, followed by a finals series played between the top two. The most common format over the years was that each team played each other four times in the round-robin, followed by a final decided by a best-of-three series (with the third match played only if necessary), for a total of fourteen or fifteen ODIs played through the summer.

The basic format has been unchanged throughout the tri-series' history, but specific details have varied:

- From 1980–81 to 1985–86, and in 1998–99, each team played the others five times during the round robin
- In 1980–81 and 1981–82, the finals series was best of five
- In 1994–95 only, a quadrangular series featuring two touring sides, Australia and Australia A was played; each team played the others twice during the round robin, followed by a best-of-three finals series. Matches played against Australia A are considered List A matches, but not as official One Day Internationals.
- In 2004–05 only, each team played the others only three times during the round robin
- In 2014–15 only, each team played the others only twice during the round robin with a solitary final

Over its duration, the series has taken on several mostly commercial names:

- Benson & Hedges World Series Cup (1979–80 to 1987–88)
- Benson & Hedges World Series (1988–89 to 1995–96)
  - New laws limiting tobacco advertising in Australia forced the name to change after 1995–96
- Carlton & United Series (1996–97 to 1999–2000)
- Carlton Series (2000–01)
- Victoria Bitter Series (2001–02 to 2005–06, 2015/16 to 2016/17)
- Commonwealth Bank Series (2006–07 to 2012–13)
- Carlton Mid Series (2013–14 to 2014/15)

After the 2007–08 season, the tri-series format was abandoned as a regular fixture. For three seasons (2008–09 until 2010–11), Australia still played ODIs against two touring teams, but these were staged as separate ODI series against a single opponent. The Commonwealth Bank was still the naming rights sponsor of ODI cricket in Australia during these summers, so all series were still known as the Commonwealth Bank Series during this time.

The tri-series format returned in the 2011–12 season, but did not herald a permanent return to the format. A shortened tri-series of only seven matches (six round-robin matches and a final) was played in the 2014–15 season in the lead-up to the 2015 World Cup in Australia.

== Results ==
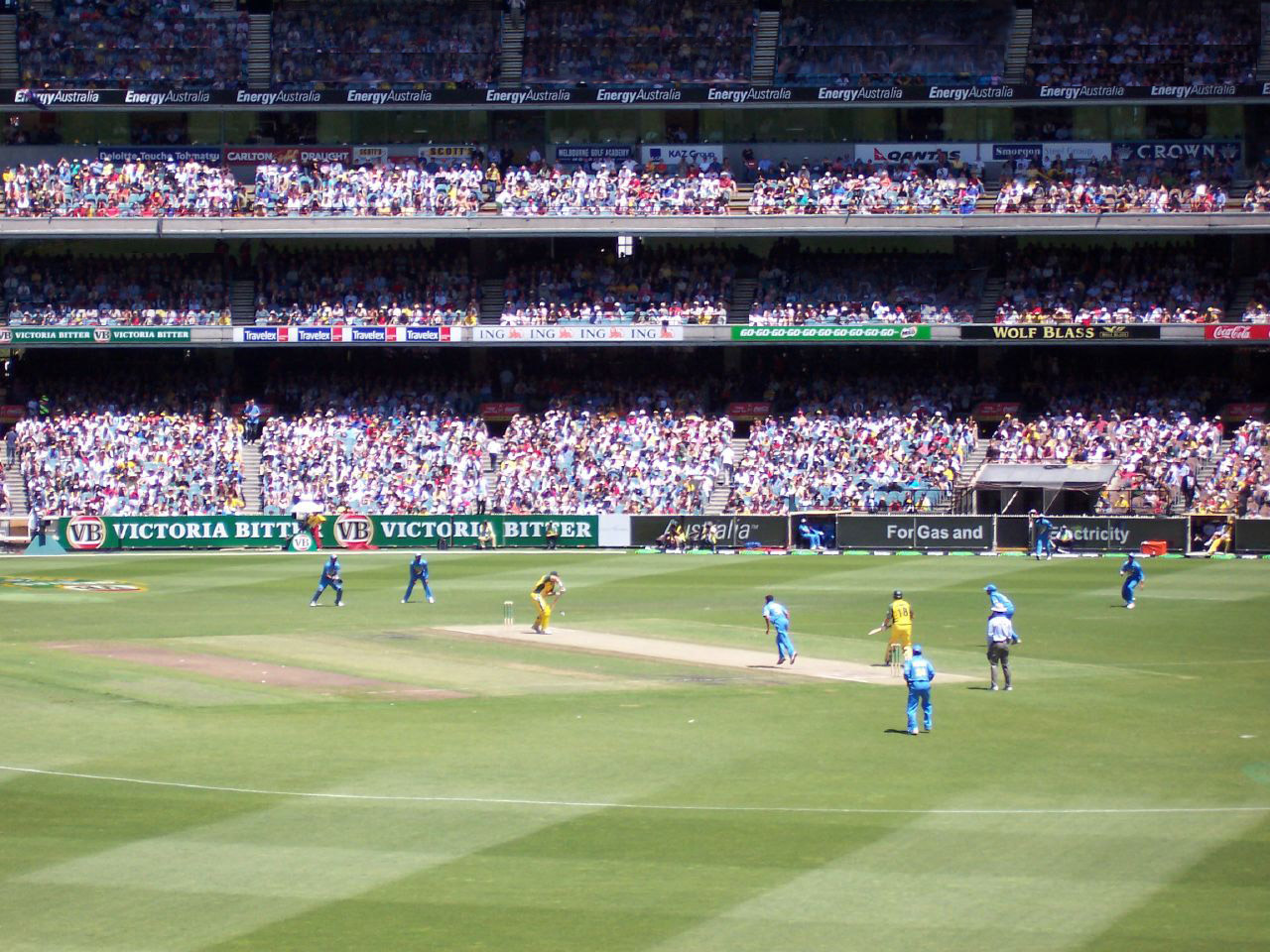
AUS vs IND Victoria Bitter Series 2003–04 at the MCG.

Played mostly during a strong era for Australian cricket, Australia won twenty of the thirty-one tri-series played up to 2014–15. Australia failed to reach the finals on only three occasions. West Indies, who featured in the series frequently during the 1980s, was the next most successful team, winning six tournaments. Other international teams to win the tri-series were England (twice), India, Pakistan and South Africa (once each).

=== Tournament results by season ===
Season	1st place	2nd place	3rd place	Final grounds
1979–1980	West Indies	England	Australia	MCG, SCG
1979–1980	Most Runs: Viv Richards (WIN) – 485, Most Wickets: Dennis Lillee (AUS) – 20			
1980–1981	Australia	New Zealand	India	MCG, SCG
1980–1981	Most Runs: Greg Chappell (AUS) – 686, Most Wickets: Dennis Lillee (AUS) – 25			
1981–1982	West Indies	Australia	Pakistan	MCG, SCG
1981–1982	Most Runs: Viv Richards (WIN) – 536, Most Wickets: Joel Garner (WIN) – 24			
1982–1983	Australia	New Zealand	England	MCG, SCG
1982–1983	Most Runs: David Gower (ENG) – 563, Most Wickets: Ian Botham (ENG) – 17			
1983–1984	West Indies	Australia	Pakistan	MCG, SCG
1983–1984	Most Runs: Kepler Wessels (AUS) – 495, Most Wickets: Michael Holding (WIN) – 23			
1984–1985	West Indies	Australia	Sri Lanka	MCG, SCG
1984–1985	Most Runs: Viv Richards (WIN) – 651, Most Wickets: Joel Garner, Michael Holding (WIN) – 16			
1985–1986	Australia	India	New Zealand	MCG, SCG
1985–1986	Most Runs: David Boon (AUS) – 418, Most Wickets: Kapil Dev (IND) – 20			
1986–1987	England	Australia	West Indies	MCG, SCG
1986–1987	Most Runs: Dean Jones (AUS) – 396, Most Wickets: Phillip DeFreitas (ENG) – 17			
1987–1988	Australia	New Zealand	Sri Lanka	MCG, SCG
1987–1988	Most Runs: Dean Jones (AUS) – 461, Most Wickets: Tony Dodemaide (AUS) – 18			
1988–1989	West Indies	Australia	Pakistan	MCG, SCG
1988–1989	Most Runs: Desmond Haynes (WIN) – 563, Most Wickets: Curtly Ambrose (WIN) – 21			
1989–1990	Australia	Pakistan	Sri Lanka	MCG, SCG
1989–1990	Most Runs: Dean Jones (AUS) – 461, Most Wickets: Simon O'Donnell (AUS) – 20			
1990–1991	Australia	New Zealand	England	MCG, SCG
1990–1991	Most Runs: Dean Jones (AUS) – 513, Most Wickets: Chris Pringle (NZL) – 18			
1991–1992	Australia	India	West Indies	MCG, SCG
1991–1992	Most Runs: David Boon (AUS) – 432, Most Wickets: Craig McDermott (AUS) – 21			
1992–1993	West Indies	Australia	Pakistan	MCG, SCG
1992–1993	Most Runs: Brian Lara (WIN) – 331, Most Wickets: Curtly Ambrose (WIN) – 18			
1993–1994	Australia	South Africa	New Zealand	MCG, SCG
1993–1994	Most Runs: Mark Waugh (AUS) – 395, Most Wickets: Shane Warne (AUS) – 20			
1994–1995	Australia	Australia A	England (Note: Zimbabwe finished fourth)	MCG, SCG
1994–1995	Most Runs: David Boon (AUS) – 384, Most Wickets: Glenn McGrath (AUS) – 18			
1995–1996	Australia	Sri Lanka	West Indies	MCG, SCG
1995–1996	Most Runs: Mark Taylor (AUS) – 423, Most Wickets: Ottis Gibson (WIN) – 16			
1996–1997	Pakistan	West Indies	Australia	MCG, SCG
1996–1997	Most Runs: Brian Lara (WIN) – 424, Most Wickets: Shane Warne (AUS) – 19			
1997–1998	Australia	South Africa	New Zealand	MCG, SCG
1997–1998	Most Runs: Ricky Ponting (AUS) – 462, Most Wickets: Allan Donald (RSA) – 17			
1998–1999	Australia	England	Sri Lanka	MCG, SCG
1998–1999	Most Runs: Mark Waugh (AUS) – 542, Most Wickets: Glenn McGrath (AUS) – 27			
1999–2000	Australia	Pakistan	India	MCG, SCG
1999–2000	Most Runs: Ricky Ponting (AUS) – 404, Most Wickets: Glenn McGrath (AUS) – 19			
2000–2001	Australia	West Indies	Zimbabwe	MCG, SCG
2000–2001	Most Runs: Mark Waugh (AUS) – 542, Most Wickets: Shane Warne (AUS) – 19			
2001–2002	South Africa	New Zealand	Australia	MCG, SCG
2001–2002	Most Runs: Jonty Rhodes (RSA) – 345, Most Wickets: Shane Bond (NZL) – 21			
2002–2003	Australia	England	Sri Lanka	MCG, SCG
2002–2003	Most Runs: Nick Knight (ENG) – 461, Most Wickets: Brett Lee (AUS) – 18			
2003–2004	Australia	India	Zimbabwe	MCG, SCG
2003–2004	Most Runs: Adam Gilchrist (AUS) – 498, Most Wickets: Irfan Pathan (IND) – 16			
2004–2005	Australia	Pakistan	West Indies	MCG, SCG
2004–2005	Most Runs: Michael Clarke (AUS) – 411, Most Wickets: Brett Lee (AUS) – 16			
2005–2006	Australia	Sri Lanka	South Africa	The Gabba, SCG
2005–2006	Most Runs: Kumar Sangakkara (SRL) – 469, Most Wickets: Nathan Bracken (AUS) – 17			
2006–2007	England	Australia	New Zealand	MCG, SCG
2006–2007	Most Runs: Ricky Ponting (AUS) – 445, Most Wickets: Glenn McGrath (AUS) – 13			
2007–2008	India	Australia	Sri Lanka	MCG, SCG
2007–2008	Most Runs: Gautam Gambhir (IND) – 440, Most Wickets: Nathan Bracken (AUS) – 21			
2008-11: not contested
2011–2012	Australia	Sri Lanka	India	MCG, SCG
2011–2012	Most Runs: Tillakaratne Dilshan (SRL) – 514, Most Wickets: Lasith Malinga (SRL) – 18			
2014–2015	Australia	England	India	MCG, SCG
2014–2015	Most Runs: Ian Bell (ENG) – 247, Most Wickets: Mitchell Starc (AUS) – 12			

== Notable moments in the Australian Tri-Series ==
- 1979–80 – The match on 27 November 1979 between Australia and West Indies in Sydney was the first official One Day International to be played at night. Like the tri-series concept itself, night matches were a World Series Cricket initiative that was adopted into ODI cricket. For this season, the red ball was used and white pads were worn for matches in Adelaide and Brisbane and Melbourne, and the white ball was used and coloured pads worn for matches in Sydney.
- 1979–80 – England defeated West Indies by two runs in Sydney when, with the West Indies requiring three runs to win from the final ball of the match, England captain Mike Brearley pushed all of his fieldsmen, including the wicket-keeper, back to the boundary. ODI rules were changed to incorporate fielding restrictions to prevent any repeat of this incident.
- 1980–81 – In the third final, with New Zealand needing six runs from the final ball to tie the match, Australian captain Greg Chappell ordered his younger brother, Trevor to bowl the ball underarm along the ground. This was one of cricket's most controversial moments of all time. ODI laws were changed so that any ball delivered underarm would be called a no-ball and a dead ball.
- 1981–82 – In the final qualifying match, Australia defeated West Indies at Sydney on run-rate after rain ended the match with the last 6.5 overs remaining. The next morning, Melbourne's The Age newspaper alleged the West Indies had deliberately lost the match to ensure Australia qualified for the finals ahead of Pakistan, meaning the Australian Cricket Board would receive $800,000 in extra gate takings. West Indies captain Clive Lloyd, who had withdrawn from the match due to illness, subsequently won a libel action and $100,000 in damages from The Age.
- 1982–83 – New Zealand breaks the world record for the highest successful run chase in an ODI, scoring 297–6 to surpass England's 296–5 in Adelaide. The record stood until 1992.
- 1982–83 – In the second final at Melbourne versus Australia, New Zealander Lance Cairns scored the then World record fastest ODI fifty off 21 balls, hitting 6 sixes. This is still currently the fastest 50 in Australian Tri-Series matches.
- 1983–84 – The first ever tied One-day International took place in the second final at the MCG between Australia and West Indies, after Carl Rackemann was run out attempting the winning run.
- 1984–85 – West Indies were the first team to go through the qualifying round unbeaten by winning all 10 matches. Although they lost the first match v Australia, they came back from behind to win the finals series 2–1.
- 1985–86 – After having clinched a finals berth, Australia was defeated by New Zealand by 206 runs in Adelaide after being bowled out for 70. This is still Australia's second-heaviest defeat by runs in ODI history.
- 1985–86 – Australian fast bowler Bruce Reid took the first hat-trick in the history of the Australian Tri-series in Sydney versus New Zealand on 29 January 1986.
- 1986–87 – This season was the first time the 4-times Tri-Series champions, West Indies did not make the finals as England beat Australia 2–0. Mike Gatting's side also won that season's Ashes Test match series and The Challenge Cup.
- 1988–89 – The first match of that season's tournament, West Indies v Pakistan, Adelaide, 10 December 1988, was the first one-day international to feature shirts bearing both the team's names and player's names and surnames.
- 1988–89 – In the third final at Sydney, rain stopped play for one hour and 25 minutes with West Indies at 47/2 after 6.4 overs chasing Australia's 4/226 off 38 overs, and West Indies target was revised to 108 off the 18 overs that remained; West Indies won the match (and the competition) with 4.4 overs remaining after Desmond Haynes hit Steve Waugh for six. Australian fans loudly booed this unsatisfactory conclusion, and criticism from the media led to the Average Run Rate method being replaced by the Most Productive Overs method for setting revised targets in interrupted matches.
- 1992–93 – West Indian all-rounder Phil Simmons recorded bowling figures of 4/3 from 10 overs against Pakistan in Sydney. These remain the most economical bowling figures in one-day international history (qualification of 30 balls bowled).
- 1995–96 – The first match in the tournament, West Indies v Sri Lanka Adelaide, 15 December 1995, was the first One Day International that featured numbers and names on the back of player's shirts after they were introduced for that season's Mercantile Mutual Cup tournament. That same season, Michael Bevan famously hit four runs off the last ball of the match to give Australia a hard-fought victory against West Indies on New Year's Day.
- 1996–97 – Australia misses the finals for the first time since the 1979–80 Series; it is also the first time West Indies finish as Runners-up, with Pakistan winning the series 2 – 0, and not even a power failure in the 2nd final could stop them from winning.
- 2000–01 – Mark Waugh scored 173 runs for Australia against West Indies at the Melbourne Cricket Ground, the highest innings total in Australian Tri-Series history. It is also the first finals clash between Australia and West Indies since the 1992–93 season, and the first time Australia has defeated West Indies in the best of 3 finals.
- 2001–02 – Australia misses the finals for a third time (ultimately leading to Steve Waugh's dismissal from the Australian one day team), South Africa wins the finals 2–0 over New Zealand.
- 2003–04 – Ajit Agarkar recorded bowling figures of 6/42 from 9.3 overs against Australia at the Melbourne Cricket Ground. It was the first and, to date, only six wicket haul in an Australian Tri-series match.
- 2005–06 – In the third final at Brisbane, Adam Gilchrist scored the fastest century in Australian Tri-Series history off 67 balls versus Sri Lanka.
- 2006–07 – Despite losing 5–0 to Australia in the Ashes, England staged a comeback to win the tri-series against Australia.
- 2011–12 – Daniel Christian became the 31st person, and only the 4th Australian, to take a One Day hat-trick.

== See also ==
- Nidahas Trophy

== Notes and references ==
- Limited Overs International Cricket – The Complete Record (1971–1996), Bill Frindall Headline ISBN 0-7472-1173-6
- One Day International Cricket – The Ultimate Guide to Limited-Overs Internationals compiled by Stephen Samuelson, Ray Mason and David Clark. Feb 1999. Robinson Publishing ISBN 1-84119-038-1
