= 1982–83 Australian Tri-Series =

1982–83 Benson & Hedges World Series Cup
- Date: 9 January 1983 – 13 February 1983
- Location: Australia
- Result: Won by Australia; 2–0 in final series
Teams
Australia	England	New Zealand
Captains
Kim Hughes	Bob Willis	Geoff Howarth
Most runs
David Hookes 391	David Gower 563	John Wright 362
Most wickets
Geoff Lawson 16	Ian Botham 17	Martin Snedden 15

The 1982–83 Benson & Hedges World Series Cup was a One Day International (ODI) cricket tri-series where Australia played host to England and New Zealand. Australia and New Zealand reached the Finals, which Australia won 2–0. New Zealand and England would not contest the tri-series with Australia again until the 1990-91 season

== Uniforms ==
Australia
Australia Kit

England
England Kit

New Zealand
New Zealand Kit

== Points Table ==
Pos	Team	P	W	L	NR	T	Points
1	New Zealand	10	6	4	0	0	12
2	Australia	10	5	5	0	0	10
3	England	10	4	6	0	0	8

== Result summary ==
=== 1st Match ===
9 January 1983
Scorecard

New Zealand; 181 (44.5 overs)	v	Australia; 182/2 (46.4 overs)
John Wright 54 (64); Carl Rackemann 4/39 (10 overs)		Kepler Wessels 79 (118); Martin Snedden 2/47 (10 overs)

Australia won by 8 wickets
Melbourne Cricket Ground, Melbourne
Umpires: Tony Crafter (Aus) and Rex Whitehead (Aus)
Player of the match: John Dyson (Aus)

- Australia won the toss and elected to field.
- Kepler Wessels and Carl Rackemann (Aus) and Jeff Crowe and Peter Webb (NZ) made their ODI debuts

=== 2nd Match ===
11 January 1983 (D/N)
Scorecard

Australia; 180 (46.4 overs)	v	England; 149 (41.1 overs)
John Dyson 49 (96); Geoff Miller 3/28 (10 overs)		Allan Lamb 49 (92); Greg Chappell 2/17 (5.1 overs)

Australia won by 31 runs
Sydney Cricket Ground, Sydney
Umpires: Dick French (Aus) and Mel Johnson (Aus)
Player of the match: Carl Rackemann (Aus)

- England won the toss and elected to field.
- Trevor Jesty and Norman Cowans (Eng) made their ODI debuts

=== 3rd Match ===
13 January 1983
Scorecard

New Zealand; 239/8 (46.4 overs)	v	England; 237/8 (50 overs)
John Wright 55 (85); Ian Botham 3/40 (10 overs)		David Gower 122 (134); Jeremy Coney 3/46 (10 overs)

New Zealand won by 2 runs
Melbourne Cricket Ground, Melbourne
Umpires: Bruce Martin (Aus) and Mel Johnson (Aus)
Player of the match: David Gower (Eng)

- England won the toss and elected to field.

=== 4th Match ===
15 January 1983
Scorecard

England; 267/6 (50 overs)	v	New Zealand; 213 (48.2 overs)
David Gower 158 (118); Richard Hadlee 2/44 (10 overs)		Bruce Edgar 40 (78); Vic Marks 3/30 (10 overs)

England won by 54 runs
Brisbane Cricket Ground, Brisbane
Umpires: Bruce Martin (Aus) and Dick French (Aus)
Player of the match: David Gower (Eng)

- New Zealand won the toss and elected to field.
- Ian Gould (Eng) made his ODI debut.

=== 5th Match ===
16 January 1983
Scorecard

England; 182 (46.4 overs)	v	Australia; 184/3 (41 overs)
Derek Randall 57 (97); Carl Rackemann 3/28 (8.4 overs)		David Hookes 54 (56); Ian Botham 3/29 (8 overs)

Australia won by 7 wickets
Brisbane Cricket Ground, Brisbane
Umpires: Peter McConnell (Aus) and Mel Johnson (Aus)
Player of the match: David Hookes (Aus)

- Australia won the toss and elected to field.

=== 6th Match ===
18 January 1983 (D/N)
Scorecard

New Zealand; 226/8 (50 overs)	v	Australia; 179 (45.3 overs)
Jeff Crowe 56 (73); Rodney Hogg 2/32 (10 overs)		David Hookes 68 (91); Lance Cairns 4/16 (10 overs)

New Zealand won by 47 runs
Sydney Cricket Ground, Sydney
Umpires: Peter McConnell (Aus) and Mel Johnson (Aus)
Player of the match: David Hookes (Aus)

- Australia won the toss and elected to field.

=== 7th Match ===
20 January 1983 (D/N)
Scorecard

New Zealand; 199 (47.2 overs)	v	England; 200/2 (42.4 overs)
Bruce Edgar 74 (134); Bob Willis 4/23 (9 overs)		Allan Lamb 108 (106); Lance Cairns 4/16 (10 overs)

England won by 8 wickets
Sydney Cricket Ground, Sydney
Umpires: Tony Crafter (Aus) and Dick French (Aus)
Player of the match: Allan Lamb (Eng)

- New Zealand won the toss and elected to bat.
- Graeme Fowler (Eng) made his ODI debut.

=== 8th Match ===
22 January 1983
Scorecard

New Zealand; 246/6 (50 overs)	v	Australia; 188 (44.1 overs)
John Wright 84 (138); Carl Rackemann 3/52 (10 overs)		Kepler Wessels 62 (116); Gary Troup 4/54 (10 overs)

New Zealand won by 58 runs
Melbourne Cricket Ground, Melbourne
Umpires: Dick French (Aus) and Rex Whitehead (Aus)
Player of the match: John Wright (NZ)

- Australia won the toss and elected to field.

=== 9th Match ===
23 January 1983
Scorecard

England; 213/5 (37 overs)	v	Australia; 217/5 (34.3 overs)
Allan Lamb 94 (76); Carl Rackemann 2/41 (8 overs)		Allan Border 54 (48); Norman Cowans 2/46 (6 overs)

Australia won by 5 wickets
Melbourne Cricket Ground, Melbourne
Umpires: Tony Crafter (Aus) and Peter McConnell (Aus)
Player of the match: Allan Lamb (Eng)

- Australia won the toss and elected to field.
- Match reduced to 37 overs each due to rain
- John Maguire (Aus) made his ODI debut

=== 10th Match ===
26 January 1983 (D/N)
Scorecard

England; 207 (41 overs)	v	Australia; 109 (27.3 overs)
Derek Randall 47 (64); Denis Lillee 3/34 (8 overs)		David Hookes 32 (52); Eddie Hemmings 3/11 (3.3 overs)

England won by 98 runs
Sydney Cricket Ground, Sydney
Umpires: Bruce Martin (Aus) and Dick French (Aus)
Player of the match: Robin Jackman (Eng)

- England won the toss and elected to field.
- Match reduced to 41 overs each due to rain

=== 11th Match ===
29 January 1983
Scorecard

England; 296/5 (50 overs)	v	New Zealand; 297/6 (48.5 overs)
David Gower 109 (85); Ewen Chatfield 2/64 (10 overs)		Richard Hadlee 79 (64); Robin Jackman 2/49 (10 overs)

New Zealand won by 4 wickets
Adelaide Oval, Adelaide
Umpires: Tony Crafter (Aus) and Dick French (Aus)
Player of the match: Richard Hadlee (NZ)

- England won the toss and elected to bat.

=== 12th Match ===
30 January 1983
Scorecard

England; 228/6 (47 overs)	v	Australia; 214/7 (47 overs)
David Gower 77 (98); Rodney Hogg 2/25 (9 overs)		David Hookes 76 (95); Robin Jackman 2/36 (10 overs)

England won by 14 runs
Adelaide Oval, Adelaide
Umpires: Peter McConnell (Aus) and Mel Johnson (Aus)
Player of the match: David Gower (Eng)

- England won the toss and elected to bat.
- Match reduced to 47 overs each due to slow over rates

=== 13th Match ===
31 January 1983
Scorecard

New Zealand; 200/9 (47 overs)	v	Australia; 153 (44 overs)
Glenn Turner 84 (109); Jeff Thomson 3/27 (5 overs)		Allan Border 41 (72); Jeremy Coney 3/40 (10 overs)

New Zealand won by 47 runs
Adelaide Oval, Adelaide
Umpires: Tony Crafter (Aus) and Dick French (Aus)
Player of the match: Glenn Turner (NZ)

- England won the toss and elected to bat.
- Ken MacLeay and Tom Hogan (Aus) made their ODI debuts

=== 14th Match ===
5 February 1983
Scorecard

England; 88/7 (23 overs)	v	New Zealand; 89/3 (20.3 overs)
David Gower 35 (60); Richard Hadlee 3/15 (8 overs)		Jeremy Coney 29 (43); Bob Willis 2/28 (8.3 overs)

New Zealand won by 7 wickets
WACA Ground, Perth
Umpires: Peter McConnell (Aus) and Dick French (Aus)
Player of the match: Richard Hadlee (NZ)

- New Zealand won the toss and elected to field.
- Match reduced to 23 overs each due to rain

=== 15th Match ===
6 February 1983
Scorecard

Australia; 191/9 (50 overs)	v	New Zealand; 164 (44.5 overs)
Rod Marsh 31 (50); John Morrison 3/36 (9 overs)		John Wright 33 (66); Greg Chappell 3/35 (8 overs)

Australia won by 27 runs
WACA Ground, Perth
Umpires: Tony Crafter (Aus) and Mel Johnson (Aus)
Player of the match: Rod Marsh (Aus)

- New Zealand won the toss and elected to field.
- Steve Smith (Aus) made his ODI debut

== Final series ==
Australia won the best of three final series against New Zealand 2–0.

=== 1st Final ===
9 February 1983 (D/N)
Scorecard

New Zealand; 193/7 (49 overs)	v	Australia; 155/4 (33.1 overs)
Jeremy Coney 58 (70); Geoff Lawson 2/28 (10 overs)		Kim Hughes 63 (74); Ewen Chatfield 3/27 (10 overs)

Australia won by 6 wickets
Sydney Cricket Ground, Sydney
Umpires: Dick French (Aus) and Mel Johnson (Aus)

- New Zealand won the toss and elected to bat.
- Rain reduced the New Zealand innings to 49 overs. Australia were set a revised target 150 runs from 38 overs

=== 2nd Final ===
13 February 1983
Scorecard

Australia; 302/8 (50 overs)	v	New Zealand; 153 (39.5 overs)
Steve Smith 117 (130); Ewen Chatfield 2/54 (10 overs)		Lance Cairns 52 (25); Geoff Lawson 3/11 (8 overs)

Australia won by 149 runs
Melbourne Cricket Ground, Melbourne
Umpires: Tony Crafter (Aus) and Peter McConnell (Aus)

- Australia won the toss and elected to bat.
- Richard Webb (NZ) made his ODI debut
