= Brendon Julian =

Australian cricketer

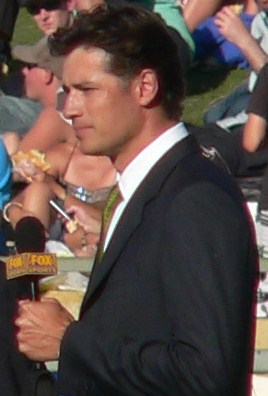
- Julian in 2008

Personal information
- Full name: Brendon Paul Julian
- Born: 10 August 1970 (age 56); Hamilton, New Zealand
- Nickname: BJ
- Height: 195 cm (6 ft 5 in)
- Batting: Right-handed
- Bowling: Left-arm fast-medium
- Role: All rounder

International information
- National side: Australia
- Test debut (cap 356): 3 June 1993 v England
- Last Test: 8 December 1995 v Sri Lanka
- ODI debut (cap 112): 23 May 1993 v England
- Last ODI: 30 May 1999 v West Indies

Domestic team information
- Years: Team
- 1989/90–2000/01: Western Australia
- 1996: Surrey

Career statistics
Competition	Test	ODI	FC	LA
Matches	7	25	138	116
Runs scored	128	224	4,074	1,126
Batting average	16.00	13.17	25.46	14.62
100s/50s	0/1	0/0	4/20	0/1
Top score	56*	35	124	64
Balls bowled	1,098	1,146	23,988	5,022
Wickets	15	22	435	130
Bowling average	39.93	45.31	30.56	30.99
5 wickets in innings	0	0	21	0
10 wickets in match	0	0	2	0
Best bowling	4/36	3/40	7/39	4/41
Catches/stumpings	4/–	8/–	88/–	39/–
Medal record
Men's Cricket
Representing Australia
ICC Cricket World Cup
Winner	1999 England-Wales -Ireland-Scotland-Netherlands
Commonwealth Games
Silver medal – second place	1998 Kuala Lumpur
- Source: Cricinfo, 2 January 2010

Brendon Paul Julian (born 10 August 1970) is an Australian cricket commentator and former cricketer. He played in 7 Tests and 25 ODIs from 1993 to 1999. He was an AIS Australian Cricket Academy scholarship holder in 1989. Julian was a part of the Australian team that won the 1999 Cricket World Cup.

Standing at 6 ft 5 in (196 cm), he was a dangerous left-arm fast-medium bowler and a tremendously hard-hitting right-handed late-middle order batsman, he was regarded as a prospect to become an all-rounder.

== Domestic career ==
He is particularly remembered for the Sheffield Shield finals of 1997–98 and 1998–99, in which innings of 124 and 84 respectively played major roles in leading the Western Warriors to back-to-back titles.

== International career ==
He had two short spells in the Australian Test team. His first stint was in the 1993 Ashes tour against England when he scored a gritty 56*, and secondly his tight and penetrative bowling spells in the history making West Indies tour of 1995 when in the absence of injured Craig McDermott and Damien Fleming, he and Paul Reiffel undertook new ball responsibilities.

He was a regular member of the One-day team during 1998 and 1999, being a member of the winning squad at the 1999 Cricket World Cup, despite being confined to the bench for the majority of the tournament. He was dropped after the tournament.

== Commentary career ==
He retired in 2001 to become a presenter in the travel programme Getaway for Channel 9 in Australia. He later presented sports news on National Nine News, before moving to Fox Sports. On Fox Sports he is a commentator on domestic cricket matches, host of 'Inside Cricket' and hosting Australia's 2009 and 2018 tours of South Africa.

Sporting positions
Preceded by James Brayshaw	Nelson Cricket Club professional 1990	Succeeded by Joe Scuderi
