= Melissa Marsh =

Australian basketball player

Melissa Marsh (born 28 May 1985) is an Australian former professional basketball player. She spent her whole career playing in the Women's National Basketball League (WNBL) and State Basketball League (SBL).

== Early life ==
Marsh was born in Narrogin, Western Australia.

== Basketball career ==
Marsh played in the WNBL from 2000/01 to 2013/14 for the Perth Lynx / West Coast Waves (2000–2005 and 2006–2014) and Adelaide Fellas (2005/06). She also played for the Willetton Tigers in the SBL from 2000 to 2004 and 2007 to 2015. She played 266 WNBL games and over 250 SBL games. In September 2013, Marsh was named in the 25 Year SBL All Star team. She retired from the WNBL in February 2014.

With the Willetton Tigers, Marsh won championships in 2004, 2009, 2010, 2011.

In August 2022, Marsh was inducted into the Basketball WA Hall of Fame.

Marsh joined the Willetton Tigers women's team as an assistant coach for the 2026 NBL1 West season.

== Personal life ==
Marsh's father Geoffrey, and brothers Shaun and Mitchell, have all represented the Australian national cricket team.
