= Subroto Banerjee =

Indian cricketer (born 1969)

Personal information
- Full name: Subroto Tara Banerjee
- Born: 13 February 1969 (age 57); Patna, Bihar, India
- Batting: Right-handed
- Bowling: Right-arm medium-fast

International information
- National side: India
- Only Test (cap 194): 22 February 1990 v Australia
- ODI debut (cap 83): 6 December 1991 v West Indies
- Last ODI: 19 December 1992 v South Africa

Career statistics
Competition	Test	ODI
Matches	1	6
Runs scored	3	49
Batting average	3.00	24.50
100s/50s	0/0	0/0
Top score	3	25*
Balls bowled	108	240
Wickets	3	5
Bowling average	15.66	40.40
5 wickets in innings	0	0
10 wickets in match	0	0
Best bowling	3/47	3/30
Catches/stumpings	0/–	3/–
- Source: Cricinfo, 4 February 2006

Subroto Tara Banerjee (born 13 February 1969) is a former Indian cricketer who played in one Test and 6 ODIs from 1991 to 1992.

He is the current senior National cricket team selector. He was a member of the Indian cricket team that played in the 1992 World Cup. The one Test that he played for India was also the Test debut of Australian cricket player Shane Warne. He played in the third Test at Sydney Cricket Ground as the fourth seamer as Indian cricket team took the field without a specialist spinner where he took three wickets for 47 which included Mark Waugh, Mark Taylor and Geoff Marsh in the first innings.

== See also ==
- One Test Wonder
