= Richard Petrie =

New Zealand cricketer (born 1967)

Personal information
- Full name: Richard George Petrie
- Born: 23 August 1967 (age 59); Christchurch, New Zealand
- Batting: Right-handed
- Bowling: Right-arm fast-medium
- Role: Bowler

International information
- National side: New Zealand (1990–1991)
- ODI debut (cap 73): 29 November 1990 v Australia
- Last ODI: 9 February 1991 v England

Domestic team information
- Years: Team
- 1988/89–1992/93: Canterbury
- 1993/94–2000/01: Wellington

Career statistics
Competition	ODI	FC	LA
Matches	12	56	118
Runs scored	65	1,581	1,846
Batting average	13.00	23.59	22.51
100s/50s	0/0	1/5	0/9
Top score	21	100	85
Balls bowled	660	8,631	5,262
Wickets	12	134	136
Bowling average	37.41	30.43	27.24
5 wickets in innings	0	3	1
10 wickets in match	0	0	0
Best bowling	2/25	5/23	5/24
Catches/stumpings	2/–	20/–	15/–
- Source: Cricinfo, 24 April 2017

Richard George Petrie (born 23 August 1967) is a former New Zealand international cricketer who played 12 One Day Internationals.

In February 2020, he was named in New Zealand's squad for the Over-50s Cricket World Cup in South Africa. However, the tournament was cancelled during the third round of matches due to the coronavirus pandemic.
