= Desmond Haynes =

Barbadian cricketer (born 1956)

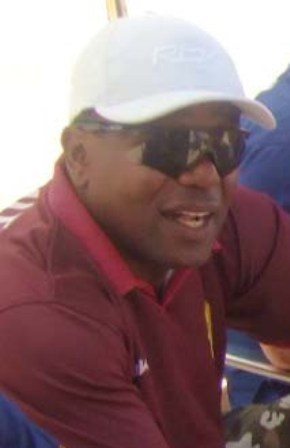

Personal information
- Full name: Desmond Leo Haynes
- Born: 15 February 1956 (age 70); Saint James, Barbados
- Batting: Right-handed
- Bowling: Right arm leg break Right-arm medium

International information
- National side: West Indies
- Test debut (cap 163): 3 March 1978 v Australia
- Last Test: 13 April 1994 v England
- ODI debut (cap 25): 22 February 1978 v Australia
- Last ODI: 5 March 1994 v England

Domestic team information
- Years: Team
- 1976–1995: Barbados
- 1983: Scotland
- 1989–1994: Middlesex
- 1994–1997: Western Province

Career statistics
Competition	Test	ODI	FC	LA
Matches	116	238	376	419
Runs scored	7,487	8,648	26,030	15,651
Batting average	42.29	41.27	45.90	42.07
100s/50s	18/39	17/57	61/138	28/110
Top score	184	152*	255*	152*
Balls bowled	18	30	536	780
Wickets	1	0	8	9
Bowling average	8.00	–	34.87	65.77
5 wickets in innings	0	–	0	0
10 wickets in match	0	–	0	0
Best bowling	1/2	–	1/2	1/9
Catches/stumpings	65/–	59/–	202/1	117/–
Medal record
Men's Cricket
Representing West Indies
ICC Cricket World Cup
Winner	1979 England
Runner-up	1983 England and Wales
- Source: Cricinfo, 4 February 2010

Desmond Leo Haynes (born 15 February 1956) is a former Barbadian cricketer and cricket coach who played for the West Indies cricket team between 1978 and 1994. He was a member of the squads which won the 1979 Cricket World Cup and finished as runners-up at the 1983 Cricket World Cup.

Haynes favoured a more measured approach to batting and scored 7,487 runs in 116 Test matches at an average of 42.29, his highest Test innings of 184 coming against England in 1980. He is one of the few Test batsmen to have been dismissed handled the ball, falling in this fashion against India on 24 November 1983. He is also one of the few players to have scored a century on an ODI debut.

He was rated by Trinidad and Tobago Guardian as "one of the greatest of all time", while the BBC described him as "one of the greatest opening partnerships in history with fellow Barbadian Gordon Greenidge." The cricket almanac Wisden noted his "combination of timing and barely evident power", and named him one of their Cricketers of the Year in 1991. In June 2021, he was inducted into the ICC Cricket Hall of Fame as one of the special inductees to mark the inaugural edition of the ICC World Test Championship final.

== International career ==
Haynes first made his name on the international scene with 148 at Antigua in a One-Day International against Australia and until recently held a number of ODI records, including most runs and most centuries. His 148 against Australia came on his One Day International debut which still remains the highest score ever made by a batsman on debut in ODI as well as the fastest century scored by an ODI debutant. He played in the World Cup of 1979, won by the West Indies, and returned to the competition in 1983, 1987 and 1992. In the 25 World Cup matches he played, Haynes scored 854 runs at 37.13 with three fifties and one century. As of 10 December 2013 Haynes remains one of the only two players in the ODI cricket history, along with England's Dennis Amiss, to have scored a century in both his debut and last match played.

Haynes, when facing Australia in the bitter 1990–91 series, clashed verbally with Ian Healy, Merv Hughes, Craig McDermott and David Boon, who christened him 'Dessie'. He is also noted for using delaying tactics against England during the 1989–90 Test series.

Like most West Indian openers, Haynes was strong against pace and, after struggling against spin early in his career, developed into a strong player of slow bowling, exemplified by his knocks of 75 and 143 against Australia on an SCG dustbowl in 1989. Haynes had a successful career in English county cricket, playing 95 first-class games for Middlesex, scoring 7071 runs at 49.1 with a best of 255* against Sussex. He was awarded his Middlesex cap in 1989 and played at Lords till 1994. He played 63 first-class matches for Barbados from 1976/77 to 1994/95, scoring 4843 at 49.92 with a top score of 246 and 21 games for Western Province from 1994/95 to 1996/97, making 1340 runs at 40.6 with a best of 202*. In all first class cricket, he made 26030 runs at 45.90 and 15651 more in 419 one day games at 42.07 with a top score of 152*. He scored 61 first-class hundreds in all and won 55-man of the match awards in all forms of the game.

Haynes was only the third West Indian to carry his bat in a Test innings. He is one of only two players in international Test Cricket to achieve this feat three times, the other being Dean Elgar. Haynes announced his retirement in March 1997 after playing a first-class game for Western Province against Natal in Cape Town. He made 83 in the first innings and was dismissed for a third-ball duck in the second and his last.

=== Centuries ===
Haynes scored centuries (100 or more runs in an innings) in Test matches and One Day International (ODI) matches on 18 and 17 occasions respectively during his international career.

His first Test century came in February 1980 against New Zealand at the Carisbrook, Dunedin, a match the West Indies lost by one wicket. His highest score of 184 runs came the same year against England at the Lord's Cricket Ground, London. Five of his Test centuries came against Australia. Haynes scored Test centuries at twelve cricket grounds, against five different opponents, including eight at venues outside the West Indies. As of August 2013, he is seventh in the list of Test century-makers for the West Indies.

He scored a century on his ODI debut in February 1978 against Australia at the Antigua Recreation Ground, St John's. His score of 148 runs in the match earned him a man of the match award, resulting in the West Indies' win. His highest score in ODIs remained 152 runs, against India at the Bourda, Georgetown in March 1989. Due to his man-of-the-match performance, the West Indies won the match by 101 runs, and the series 5–0. He was most successful against Australia making six ODI centuries against them. As of August 2013, Haynes is the third in the list of ODI century-makers for the West Indies, and sixteenth overall among all-time combined century-makers.

== Post-retirement ==
After retirement as player, Haynes has served as Chairman of Selectors of the Barbados Cricket Association, President of Carlton Cricket Club, Secretary of the West Indies Players' Association and is currently a Director at Cricket West Indies. He is a former Government Senator and was Chairman of the National Sports Council. His main relaxation is golf. A biography Lion of Barbados was published about him, punning on his middle name 'Leo'.

Preceded by Viv Richards	West Indies Test cricket captains 1989/90–1990/91	Succeeded by Viv Richards
