= Col Timmins =

Australian cricket umpire (born 1947)

Personal information
- Full name: Colin Douglas Timmins
- Born: 2 April 1947 (age 79); Brisbane, Queensland, Australia
- Role: Umpire

Umpiring information
- Tests umpired: 4 (1989–1993)
- ODIs umpired: 20 (1988–1995)
- WTests umpired: 1 (1985)
- Source: Cricinfo, 12 July 2013

Colin Douglas Timmins (born 2 April 1947 in Brisbane, Queensland) was an Australian Test cricket match umpire, from Queensland.

He umpired 4 Test matches between 1989 and 1993. His first match was between Australia and Sri Lanka at Brisbane on 8 to 12 December 1989, a drawn match on which the bat dominated, Tom Moody and Mark Taylor scoring centuries. Timmins' partner was Tony Crafter.

Timmins' last Test match was between Australia and the West Indies at Perth on 30 January to 1 February 1993, won before lunch on the third day by the visitors by an innings and 25 runs. Australia's batting was inept against Curtly Ambrose (7/25 in the first innings) and Ian Bishop (6/40 in the second). Timmins' partner was Steve Randell.

Timmins umpired 20 One Day International (ODI) matches between 1988 and 1995. He umpired one women's Test match in 1985. Altogether, he umpired 67 first-class matches in his career between 1981 and 1995.

== See also ==
- List of Test cricket umpires
- List of One Day International cricket umpires
