= Ian Thomas (umpire) =

Australian cricket umpire (born 1950)

Personal information
- Born: 2 April 1950 (age 76); Kogarah, New South Wales, Australia

Umpiring information
- ODIs umpired: 8 (1990–1994)
- Source: Cricinfo, 30 May 2014

Ian Stuart Thomas (born 2 April 1950) is a former Australian cricket umpire. He stood in eight ODI games between 1990 and 1994.

== See also ==
- List of One Day International cricket umpires
