= Aamer Malik =

Pakistani cricketer (born 1963)

Personal information
- Born: 3 January 1963 (age 63); Mandi Bahauddin, Punjab
- Batting: Right-handed
- Bowling: Right-arm fast-medium

International information
- National side: Pakistan (1987–1994)
- Test debut (cap 108): 7 December 1987 v England
- Last Test: 5 October 1994 v Australia
- ODI debut (cap 65): 18 March 1988 v West Indies
- Last ODI: 14 October 1994 v Australia

Career statistics
| Competition | Test | ODI |
|---|---|---|
| Matches | 14 | 24 |
| Runs scored | 565 | 556 |
| Batting average | 35.31 | 25.27 |
| 100s/50s | 2/3 | 0/5 |
| Top score | 117 | 90 |
| Balls bowled | 156 | 120 |
| Wickets | 1 | 3 |
| Bowling average | 89.00 | 28.66 |
| 5 wickets in innings | 0 | 0 |
| 10 wickets in match | 0 | 0 |
| Best bowling | 1/0 | 2/35 |
| Catches/stumpings | 15/1 | 13/3 |
- Source: ESPNCricinfo, 4 February 2017

Aamer Malik (born 3 January 1963) is a former Pakistani cricketer who played in 14 Test matches and 24 One Day Internationals from 1987 to 1994. In 1987 he took over from Ray Berry as the professional at Hyde CC, playing in the Central Lancashire League.
