= Ric Evans =

Australian cricket umpire (born 1942)

Richard James Evans (born 20 November 1942) was an Australian Test cricket umpire, from Western Australia.

He umpired in 3 Test matches between 1989 and 1990. His first match was between Australia and the West Indies at Adelaide on 3 February to 7 February 1989, a drawn match on a batting pitch too good for a result. Dean Jones scored 216 in Australia's first innings of 515, and Mike Whitney took 7/89 in the West Indies’ reply. Evans’ partner, as in all his matches, was Peter McConnell.

Evans’ last Test match was between Australia and Pakistan at Melbourne on 12 January to 16 January 1990, won by Australia by 92 runs with only 22 minutes left. Mark Taylor scored a century, Terry Alderman took 8 wickets, and Merv Hughes 6 wickets. Six LBW decisions went Australia's way in Pakistan's second innings and this, said Wisden (1991 ed., pp. 1034–5), "brought a good match to a somewhat contentious conclusion".

Evans umpired 17 One Day International (ODI) matches between 1988 and 1994. Altogether, he umpired 47 first-class matches in his career between 1984 and 1997.

Ric has just recently resigned from the WA Cricket Association as Umpire Manager to take up an umpire high performance role with Cricket Australia.

== See also ==
- List of Test cricket umpires
- List of One Day International cricket umpires
