= Len King (cricket umpire) =

Australian cricket umpire (born 1941)

Leonard King
Personal information
- Full name: Leonard John King
- Born: 30 November 1941 (age 84)
- Role: Umpire

Umpiring information
- Tests umpired: 6 (1989–1993)
- ODIs umpired: 23 (1988–1993)
- WODIs umpired: 1 (1988)
- Source: Cricinfo, 13 July 2013

Leonard John King (born 31 July 1941) was an Australian Test cricket umpire from Victoria.

At the international level, he umpired 6 Test matches between 1989 and 1993. His first match was between Australia and the West Indies at Sydney from 26 January to 30 January 1989, won by Australia by 7 wickets, with David Boon scoring a century and Allan Border a career-best 11 wickets and 75 runs, "an all-round performance seldom surpassed in Test cricket," according to Wisden. King's partner was Terry Prue.

King's last Test match was also between Australia and the West Indies at Adelaide on 23 January to 26 January 1993, a fluctuating match won by the visitors by a mere one run when Australia's No. 11, Craig McDermott, was dismissed after a 40-run partnership with Tim May had brought Australia so close to victory. May and Merv Hughes both took 5 wickets in an innings. King's colleague was Darrell Hair.

King umpired 23 One Day International (ODI) matches between 1988 and 1993. In 1988 he umpired a women's ODI match. Altogether, he umpired 41 first-class matches in his career between 1984 and 1994.

== See also ==
- List of Test cricket umpires
- List of One Day International cricket umpires
