= Steve Randell =

Australian cricket umpire and sex offender

Personal information
- Full name: Stephen Grant Randell
- Born: 16 September 1956 (age 70); Hobart, Tasmania, Australia

Umpiring information
- Tests umpired: 36 (1984–1998)
- ODIs umpired: 88 (1984–1998)
- WODIs umpired: 1 (1991)
- Source: ESPNcricinfo, 11 July 2008

Stephen Grant Randell (born 19 February 1956) is a former Australian Test cricket match umpire, and the first from Tasmania. In 1999, he was convicted of 15 counts of sexual assault against nine schoolgirls aged 10–12 while teaching at a Catholic primary school between 1981 and 1982.

== Biography ==
Randell was born in Hobart, Tasmania.

He umpired 36 Test matches between 1984 and 1998, the highest number by an Australian umpire to that time (the previous highest was Tony Crafter's 33 matches). His umpiring debut was the Fourth Test between Australia and the West Indies at Melbourne from 22 to 27 December 1984. Randell's fellow umpire in that match was Peter McConnell.

In 1994, the International Cricket Council introduced a policy of appointing one umpire to each Test match from a non-participating country. Ten of Randell's matches were played outside Australia, and did not involve Australia. His last Test match involving Australia was against South Africa at Adelaide on 30 January to 3 February 1998, finishing in a draw, with captain Mark Taylor dominating the first innings with 169 and Mark Waugh scoring a century in the second innings. Randell's umpiring colleague in that match was a New Zealander, Doug Cowie.

Randell's last Test match was between Zimbabwe and Pakistan at Harare on 21–25 March 1998. Randell umpired 88 One Day International (ODI) matches between 1984 and 1998. He also umpired one women's ODI, in 1991. Altogether, he umpired 119 first-class matches in his career between 1980 and 1998.

At the club level, Randell was a left-hand batsman for the South Hobart and Sandy Bay clubs. Off the field he was a school-teacher with the Tasmanian Education Department.

== Sexual assault conviction ==
His cricket and professional careers ended when he was convicted in August 1999 of 15 separate counts of sexual assault against nine schoolgirls of ages 10–12 while teaching at a Catholic primary school between 1981 and 1982. He was sentenced to four years jail with a two-year minimum, and was released on parole in May 2002.

== See also ==
- List of Test cricket umpires
- List of One Day International cricket umpires
