= Mike Whitney =

Australian cricketer

Mike Whitney AM
Personal information
- Full name: Michael Roy Whitney
- Born: 24 February 1959 (age 67); Surry Hills, New South Wales, Australia
- Height: 185 cm (6 ft 1 in)
- Batting: Right-handed
- Bowling: Left-arm fast medium

International information
- National side: Australia
- Test debut (cap 313): 13 August 1981 v England
- Last Test: 26 December 1992 v West Indies
- ODI debut (cap 76): 17 March 1983 v New Zealand
- Last ODI: 10 January 1993 v West Indies

Domestic team information
- Years: Team
- 1980/81–1993/94: New South Wales
- 1981: Gloucestershire

Career statistics
Competition	Test	ODI	FC	LA
Matches	12	38	118	96
Runs scored	68	40	415	116
Batting average	6.18	6.66	5.60	8.92
100s/50s	0/0	0/0	0/0	0/0
Top score	13	9*	28*	19*
Balls bowled	2,672	2,106	22,828	5,154
Wickets	39	46	412	112
Bowling average	33.97	27.15	26.75	27.82
5 wickets in innings	2	0	19	0
10 wickets in match	1	0	1	0
Best bowling	7/27	4/34	7/27	4/13
Catches/stumpings	2/–	11/–	50/–	23/0
- Source: Cricinfo, 12 December 2005

Michael Roy Whitney (born 24 February 1959) is a retired Australian former cricketer, who played in 12 Test matches and 38 One Day Internationals between 1981 and 1993.

== Cricket career ==
Whitney grew up in Matraville, in the Eastern Suburbs of Sydney. He began playing cricket at Matraville Public School, South Sydney Boys High and the Botany United Junior Cricket Club. He played all of his senior club cricket for the Randwick Cricket Club (1976–94) in the Sydney Grade Competition. Since 2001, he has been the President of the Randwick Petersham Cricket Club. He played 94 first-class matches for New South Wales from 1980 to 1994. He is one of only three fast bowlers to take more than three hundred first-class wickets for New South Wales; the others are Geoff Lawson and Trent Copeland. He was named New South Wales Cricketer of the Year in 1988–89 and was part of four Sheffield Shield–winning teams. In five Sheffield Shield Finals appearances, he took 25 wickets at 19.28. Whitney's Test debut came in unusual circumstances. Australia was touring England in 1981, and Whitney was in England playing Northern League Cricket in Lancashire for Fleetwood and some County Cricket for Gloucestershire. Injuries to Rodney Hogg and Geoff Lawson in the Australian squad led to Whitney playing the final two tests of the tour. He was the first Australian Test cricketer to be selected this way.

He later played 10 more Tests between 1987 and 1993. His best performance was in 1992. He took 11 wickets in a match against India in Perth, including 7 for 27 in the second innings. He was named Man of the Match. Whitney also took 7 for 89 in the first innings of the Fifth Test against the West Indies in Adelaide in 1989. He toured the West Indies in 1991 and Sri Lanka in 1992. He played 38 One Day Internationals, and was Australia's leading wicket-taker and most economical bowler in the 1992 World Cup.

A notoriously poor batsman, in 1987, while playing in the Boxing Day Test against New Zealand and batting at number 11, he survived 18 deliveries and held off Sir Richard Hadlee to help secure a draw for Australia. Australia won the series 1–0 and won back the Trans-Tasman Trophy. It was Allan Border's first series win as Australian captain. Whitney is a Life Member of Cricket New South Wales and the Randwick Petersham Cricket Club. On January 4, 2024 Whitney was inducted into the New South Wales Cricket Hall of Fame along with John Dyson, a Randwick, New South Wales and Australian team mate.

== Rugby league administrator ==
On 8 March 2009, Whitney was inducted as a life member by the South Sydney Rabbitohs for his contribution in being a Director and Deputy Chairman on the Football Club Board in the critical period during the club's battle for reinstatement to the competition between 1999 and 2001. He also played a decisive role with media personality Andrew Denton and lawyer Nick Pappas (current Rabbitohs Chairman) in attracting fellow Life Member Kerry Stokes to the club as a major sponsor just before its readmission to the competition in 2002, a coup that ensured the club's ability to make its triumphant return to the NRL competition.

== Television presenter ==
After retiring from cricket, he worked in the broadcast media from 1994 until his retirement in 2022. In 1994, Whitney hosted Great Ideas for the ABC. In 1995, he began working for the Seven Network and started hosting Sydney Weekender.

From 1995 to 1996, he was the referee on the Australian version of TV game show Gladiators. Nationally, he was the host of Who Dares Wins (made in Australia, the show has been seen in America on cable's Game Show Network) alongside Tania Zaetta from 1996 to 1998; the show was also popular in India on the AXN network. In 2007, Whitney hosted Last Chance Learners. He also worked as a reporter at the 2000 Sydney Olympic Games and 2002 Manchester Commonwealth Games for the Seven Network.

In January 2022, the Seven Network announced that Whitney would depart Sydney Weekender, after presenting the show for almost 30 years. His role was filled by former athlete and Seven News sports reporter Matt Shirvington.

== Books ==
Whitney wrote a book of memoirs, Quick Whit: The Mike Whitney Story (1993), and a book of stories from his cricket-playing days and his travels, Whiticisms (1996).

== Mike Whitney Band ==
From 2007 to 2019, Whitney toured with his cover group, The Mike Whitney Band, which mainly played gigs around Sydney, but also played in RSL clubs and pubs throughout Australia. Whitney played the tambourine and sang lead vocals for the band. After thirteen and a half years, the band played its last gig at the Bayview Hotel in the Sydney suburb of Gladesville on 8 June 2019. The band played a final encore at North Ryde RSL on 29 June 2019. Whitney now plays with a band called Oz Icons with Wayne "Junior" Pearce. Eric "Guru" Grothe and Angry Anderson have made guest appearances with the band.
