= Merv Hughes =

Australian cricketer

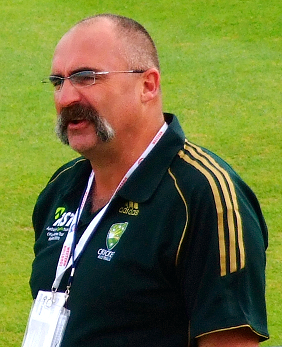
- Hughes in 2009

Personal information
- Full name: Mervyn Gregory Hughes
- Born: 23 November 1961 (age 64); Euroa, Victoria, Australia
- Nickname: Fruitfly
- Height: 192 cm (6 ft 4 in)
- Batting: Right-handed
- Bowling: Right-arm fast
- Role: Bowler

International information
- National side: Australia
- Test debut (cap 332): 13 December 1985 v India
- Last Test: 17 March 1994 v South Africa
- ODI debut (cap 104): 11 December 1988 v Pakistan
- Last ODI: 23 May 1993 v England

Domestic team information
- Years: Team
- 1981/82–1994/95: Victorian Bushrangers
- 1983: Essex
- 1997/98–1998/99: ACT Comets

Career statistics
Competition	Test	ODI	FC	LA
Matches	53	33	165	88
Runs scored	1,032	100	2,649	264
Batting average	16.64	11.11	17.54	8.51
100s/50s	0/2	0/0	0/7	0/0
Top score	72*	20	72*	20
Balls bowled	12,285	1,639	34,881	4,466
Wickets	212	38	593	105
Bowling average	28.38	29.34	29.39	30.00
5 wickets in innings	7	0	21	1
10 wickets in match	1	0	3	0
Best bowling	8/87	4/44	8/87	5/41
Catches/stumpings	23/–	6/–	56/–	19/–
- Source: Cricinfo, 26 December 2010

Mervyn Gregory Hughes (born 23 November 1961) is a former Australian cricketer. A right-arm fast bowler, he represented Australia in 53 Test matches between 1985 and 1994, taking 212 wickets. He played 33 One Day Internationals, taking 38 wickets. He took a hat-trick in a Test against the West Indies at the WACA in 1988–89. In 1993, he took 31 wickets in the Ashes series against England. He was a useful lower-order batsman, scoring two half-centuries in Tests and over 1,000 runs in all. He also represented the Victorian Bushrangers, Essex in English county cricket, the ACT Comets and Australia A in the World Series Cup.

== Childhood ==
Hughes was born in Euroa, Victoria. He attended kindergarten in Apollo Bay before the family moved back to Euroa before his first year at school. He began organised sport in 3rd grade at Werribee. In 5th grade, he pestered his father to be allowed to join football at Werribee where he held his own, despite the fact that he was one of the smallest players when out of his age group. Hughes' enthusiasm for sport was described as "unquenchable."

== Domestic career ==
Hughes started his career playing district cricket with Footscray in 1978–79. Footscray has subsequently had their main home ground named after him; it is now known as the Mervyn G. Hughes Oval. He was selected for Victoria in 1981–82 and made his debut against the South Australian Redbacks.

== International career ==
Hughes first appeared for Australia against India in 1985–86. He took 1–123 and was not re-selected until the Ashes series against England the following year.

At the WACA Ground in 1988–89, Hughes completed a hat-trick that was unusual as it was spread across three separate overs, two innings and two different days. He had Curtly Ambrose caught behind with the last ball of his 36th over; ended the West Indies' first innings in his 37th, by removing Patrick Patterson; and more than a day later, completed his hat-trick by trapping Gordon Greenidge lbw with the first ball of the West Indies' second innings. Hughes finished the match with career-best figures of 13/217, taking 5/130 in the first innings and 8/87 in the second.

The Australian selectors always viewed Hughes as a Test match player rather than a one-day player. He was generally only selected for the shorter game when another player was injured or otherwise unavailable.

Nicknamed ‘fruitfly’ - a reference to “Australia's greatest national pest” - Hughes' physical presence (a burly 6'4" with horseshoe moustache), penchant for displays of affection for his fellow players, and a tendency to talk to the opposition in colourful language made him a firm fan favourite, and supporters would often imitate his warm-up stretches behind him en masse.

His run-up to delivery was known to stretch to 45 paces - on his second Ashes tour in England during 1993, the crowd often chanted "Sumo" when he ran in to bowl.

Hughes played his last Test in Cape Town against South Africa in 1994.

== After cricket ==
Late in his career, Hughes undertook a stint with the ACT Comets, which turned out to be unsuccessful. He claimed only five wickets at an average of 46.80 over six matches (Rodney Davison, Jimmy Maher, Jamie Cox, Shaun Young and Ryan Campbell).

Hughes replaced Allan Border in June 2005 as a selector for the Australian cricket team, although his performance as a selector came under much scrutiny after many controversial decisions and the loss of the number-one ranking in Test matches after the 2009 Ashes series. However, Australia would go on to have a successful 2009–10 summer, finishing undefeated in all three forms of the game. Hughes though, was later dropped as a selector for the Australian cricket team and subsequently replaced by Greg Chappell on 29 October 2010.

He is a prominent supporter of the Western Bulldogs in the Australian Football League and has also done some acting, portraying Ivan Milat in the comedy movie Fat Pizza. Additionally, Hughes has appeared on TV commercials as well, featuring losing weight with "The 14-day All-Bran Challenge" and appearing as himself in the English comedy show Hale and Pace.

== Personal life ==
Hughes was a notorious consumer of alcohol and food. Towards the end of his career, this was felt to have increased damage to his knees and may have ultimately led to a shortening of his Australian and Victorian playing careers. Having always been rather overweight, he participated in both seasons of Channel Nine's Celebrity Overhaul to lose weight and improve his fitness. He was the top performer (weight-wise) in the first season of the show.

Hughes is noted for his large horseshoe moustache. Described by Cricinfo as being "of incredible proportions", the moustache became sufficiently synonymous with Hughes for him to be rumored to insure it for £200,000. In a 2013 Sky Sports interview during the 2013 Ashes series, he quashed this rumour as being false.

== Other sports ==
Hughes also played Australian rules football during the winter in the late 1970s and early 1980s; at his peak, he was a key position player for the Werribee Football Club in the Victorian Football Association first division.

== In the media ==
In 2015, Hughes appeared on the Australian version of the TV show I'm a Celebrity...Get Me Out of Here!.

In an interview for Hotspur magazine, Hughes revealed he has supported Tottenham Hotspur since the early 1980s. "I went to a mate's house to watch the FA Cup Final, everyone in the house was supporting the other team except the guy I sat next to. He was English, and I told him I was with him 100 per cent. Spurs won and I've supported them ever since."
