= Tony Crafter =

Australian cricket umpire (born 1940)

Personal information
- Full name: Anthony Ronald Crafter
- Born: 5 December 1940 (age 85); Mount Barker, South Australia, Australia
- Role: Umpire

Umpiring information
- Tests umpired: 33 (1979–1992)
- ODIs umpired: 84 (1979–1992)
- WTests umpired: 2 (1979–1984)
- Source: Cricinfo, 12 July 2013

Anthony Ronald "Tony" Crafter, (born 5 December 1940 in Mount Barker, South Australia), is a former Australian Test cricket match umpire.

He umpired 33 Test matches between 1979 and 1992, the highest number by an Australian umpire to that time. (The previous highest was Bob Crockett’s 32 matches.) His international umpiring debut was a Test match between Australia and England at Sydney in February 1979, which England won by 9 wickets, thus retaining The Ashes. Australian captain Graham Yallop scored 121 of the first innings total of 198, but the rest of the batting in both innings failed against Ian Botham, John Emburey and Geoff Miller. Crafter's partner was fellow debutant Don Weser.

Crafter's last Test match was between Australia and India at Perth from 1 to 5 February 1992, won by Australia by 300 runs, with David Boon, Dean Jones, and Tom Moody scoring centuries, and Mike Whitney taking 11 wickets. Indian batsman Sachin Tendulkar also scored a century. Terry Prue was the other on-field umpire for the match.

Crafter also umpired 84 One Day International (ODI) matches between 1979 and 1992.

He umpired two women's Test matches in 1979 and 1984.

He umpired 94 first-class matches in his career between 1974 and 1992, retiring after standing in the Sheffield Shield final that season. Between 1992 and 2001, Crafter served as umpire development manager for the Australian Cricket Board.

== See also ==
- List of Test cricket umpires
- List of One Day International cricket umpires
