= Terry Prue =

Australian cricket umpire (born 1948)

Terry Arthur Prue (born 11 December 1948) is a retired Australian Test umpire, from Western Australia.

He umpired 9 Test matches between 1988 and 1994. The first match he officiated in was between Australia and the West Indies at Perth from 2 to 6 December 1988. The West Indies won by 169 runs, despite Merv Hughes taking 5/130 and 8/87, including a hat-trick spread over two innings and three overs. Prue's on-filed colleague was Robin Bailhache, standing in his final Test match.

Prue's last test match was between Australia and South Africa at Adelaide on 28 January to 1 February 1994, won by Australia by 191 runs with a century to Steve Waugh and 7 wickets to Craig McDermott. Prue's colleague was Darrell Hair.

Prue umpired 39 One Day International (ODI) matches between 1988 and 1999. Altogether, he umpired 75 first-class matches in his career between 1983 and 2000.

== See also ==
- List of Test cricket umpires
- List of One Day International cricket umpires
