= Geoff Marsh =

Australian cricketer

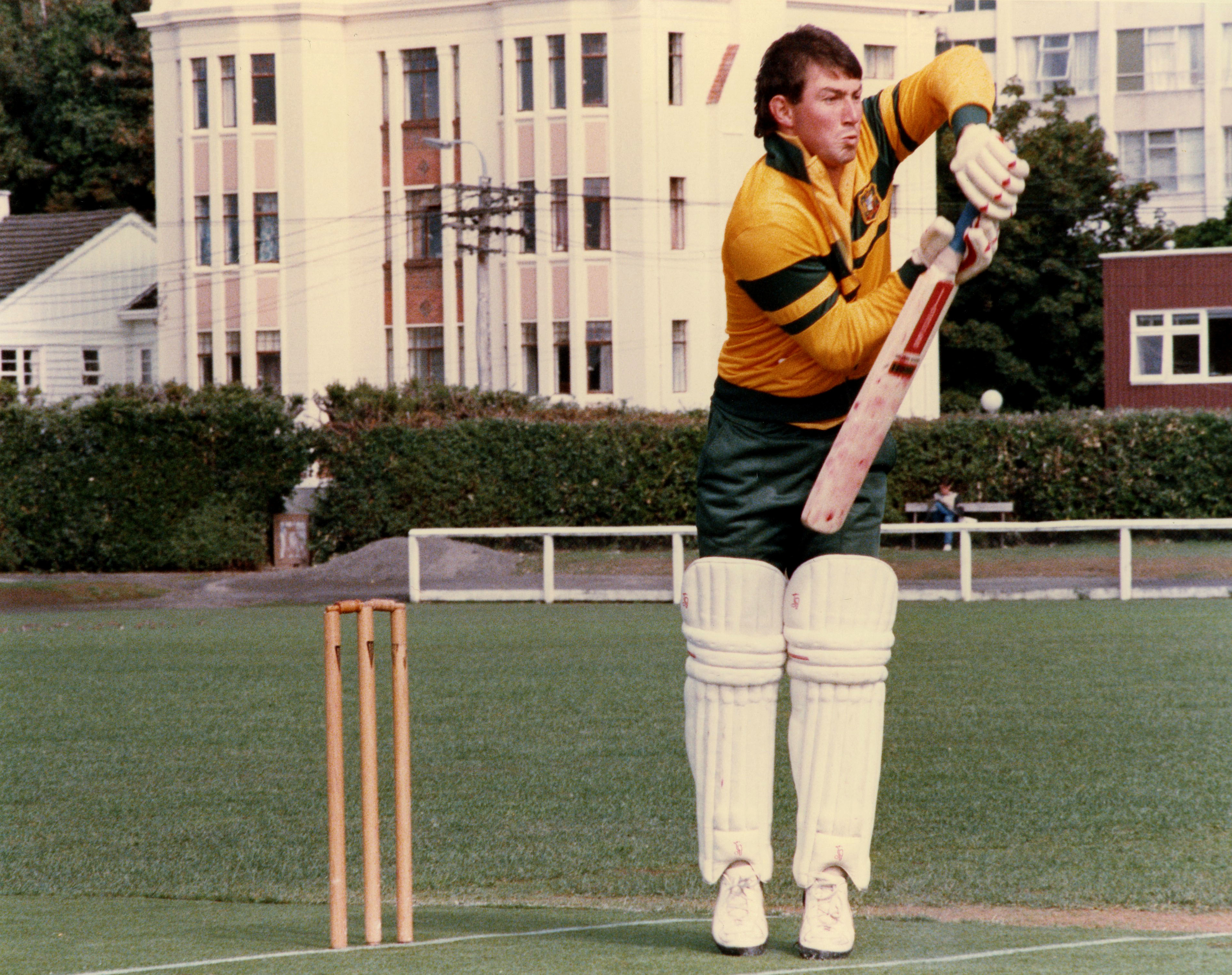
- Marsh at Victoria University, Wellington in 1986.

Personal information
- Full name: Geoffrey Robert Marsh
- Born: 31 December 1958 (age 67); Northam, Western Australia
- Nickname: Swampy
- Batting: Right-handed
- Bowling: Right arm off-spin
- Role: Opening batter
- Relatives: Shaun Marsh (son); Mitchell Marsh (son); Melissa Marsh (daughter)

International information
- National side: Australia (1985–1992)
- Test debut (cap 333): 13 December 1985 v India
- Last Test: 25 January 1992 v India
- ODI debut (cap 91): 14 January 1986 v New Zealand
- Last ODI: 11 March 1992 v Pakistan

Domestic team information
- Years: Team
- 1977/78–1993/94: Western Australia

Career statistics
Competition	Test	ODI	FC	LA
Matches	50	117	184	169
Runs scored	2,854	4,357	11,760	6,366
Batting average	33.18	39.98	39.46	42.15
100s/50s	4/15	9/22	33/46	14/36
Top score	138	126*	355*	126*
Balls bowled		6	30	6
Wickets	–	0	1	0
Bowling average	–	–	9.00	–
5 wickets in innings	–	–	0	–
10 wickets in match	–	–	0	–
Best bowling	–	–	1/1	–
Catches/stumpings	38/–	31/–	133/–	54/–
Medal record
Men's Cricket
Representing Australia
ICC Cricket World Cup
Winner	1987 India and Pakistan
Representing Australia as Coach
ICC Cricket World Cup
Winner	1999 England-Wales -Ireland-Scotland-Netherlands
Runner-up	1996 India-Pakistan-Sri Lanka
- Source: CricInfo, 17 June 2018

Geoffrey Robert Marsh (born 31 December 1958) is an Australian former cricketer, coach and selector. He played 50 Test matches and 117 One Day Internationals for Australia as an opening batsman. Marsh was a part of the Australian team that won their first world title during the 1987 Cricket World Cup. As the coach of Australia he was in charge when Australia won the 1999 Cricket World Cup in England. He later coached Zimbabwe (2001–2004) and Sri Lanka (2011–12).

== Playing career ==
Marsh was a steady, solid right-handed opening batsman and capable fielder, making his first-class debut for Western Australia as a nineteen-year-old in the 1977–1978 Sheffield Shield season. In 1978 he played five games of Australian rules football for South Fremantle in the West Australian National Football League before concentrating only on cricket.

Marsh established himself as a solid competitor on the domestic front and was on the fringes of the national team for a number of years before winning selection in the Australian Test team. He made his debut in December 1985 against India and took part of the tours of New Zealand and India the following year. However, his domestic debut was less than impressive, scoring a golden pair for Western Australia on debut at Sydney Cricket Ground, which was recorded in hand-written form on a storing cabinet inside the away team's dressing room as a symbolic "domestic honours board".

He soon made the opening position his own (despite his mediocre batting average of 33.18), batting alongside the likes of Mark Taylor and David Boon, and became an integral part of the Australian One Day International team. He along with David Boon became the first pair of openers to notch hundreds in a same ODI innings for the team

Marsh played international cricket over a seven-year period, ending in 1992.

He is best remembered for his part in the Australian team that won the 1987 World Cup in India, including an unbeaten 126 against New Zealand in Chandigarh, while he also captained his country in four matches. Over his career Marsh was a solid performer in One Day International cricket, with a batting average of nearly 40 but had a very low strike rate compared to more recent opening batsman.

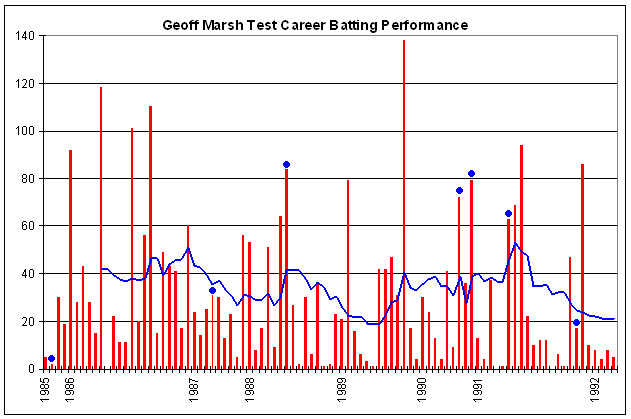
Geoff Marsh's Test career batting performance.

== Coaching career ==
Marsh retired from playing cricket in 1994 before taking up coaching. In July 1996 he was chosen as coach of the Australian national Test and One Day International teams, playing a vital part in continuing his country's positions as the top cricketing nation of the time. He was the coach of the Australian team that won the 1999 World Cup in England, guiding the team to seven consecutive victories to help them win the tournament.

He left the Australian coaching job and soon became a selector for the Australian Cricket Board (now Cricket Australia), although he left this position in 2001 to become coach of the Zimbabwean national teams. Marsh continued in this position until 2004 when his contract expired; many considered this decision was made due to the political circumstances of Zimbabwe's government under Robert Mugabe, although he has never commented publicly on the matter.

In mid 2009 Geoff was appointed Head Coach of the Fremantle District Cricket Club, a club which Geoff spend most of his senior playing career with.

He was appointed as the head coach for the team Pune Warriors India which made its IPL debut in 2011.

In September 2011, he was appointed as the head coach of the Sri Lanka national team. However, his tenure lasted barely four months. After Sri Lanka lost the Test and ODI series of their tour of South Africa in December 2011 and January 2012, he was dismissed and replaced by Graham Ford.

== Family ==
Geoff Marsh is only the third Test player - after Walter Hadlee and Lala Amarnath - to have two sons play Test cricket: Shaun Marsh, who made his test debut against Sri Lanka in 2011; and Mitchell Marsh, who made his test debut against Pakistan in 2014. The Marsh family took in the family of England cricketer Tom Curran in Zimbabwe after the Curran family were evicted from their farm. Curran made his England Test debut in the 4th Ashes Test of 2017 playing against Shaun and Mitchell who played for Australia in the same game.

Geoff Marsh's daughter Melissa Marsh played state basketball in the WNBL and was captain of the Perth Lynx.

== Career highlights ==
=== Tests ===
Test Debut: vs India, Adelaide, 1985–1986
Last Test: vs India, Adelaide, 1991–1992

- Marsh's best Test batting score of 138 was made against England, Nottingham, 1989

=== One-day internationals ===
ODI Debut: vs New Zealand, Sydney, 1985–1986
Last ODI: vs Pakistan, Perth, 1991–1992

- Marsh's best ODI batting score of 126 not out was made against New Zealand, Chandigarh, 1987 World Cup
- He captained Australia in four ODIs, winning three and losing one

=== First class cricket ===
Marsh scored 11,760 runs at 39.46, with 33 centuries.

- As of June 2018, his score of 355 not out for Western Australia against South Australia in December 1989 is the 31st highest score in first-class cricket history, and the 10th highest by an Australian.

== Film Portrayal ==
Leon Cole will be playing Geoff Marsh in the upcoming Sourav Ganguly biopic titled 'Dada'.
