= Peter McConnell (umpire) =

Australian cricket umpire (1944–2025)

Personal information
- Full name: Peter John McConnell
- Born: 11 November 1944
- Died: 30 October 2025 (aged 80); Perth, Western Australia, Australia
- Role: Umpire

Umpiring information
- Tests umpired: 22 (1983–1992)
- ODIs umpired: 68 (1983–1992)
- WTests umpired: 2 (1977–1984)
- Source: Cricinfo, 12 July 2013

Peter John McConnell (11 November 1944 – 30 October 2025) was an Australian Test cricket umpire from Western Australia.

McConnell umpired 22 Test matches from 1983 to 1992. His first match was between Australia and Pakistan in Perth from 11 November to 14 November 1983. The match was won by Australia by an innings and 9 runs, with Wayne Phillips scoring a century on debut, Graham Yallop also scoring a century and Carl Rackemann taking 11 wickets. McConnell's umpiring partner was Mel Johnson.

McConnell's last Test match was between Australia and India in Adelaide on 25 January to 29 January 1992, won by Australia by 38 runs with second innings centuries to David Boon and Mark Taylor after a first innings of only 145, and two 5-wicket bags by Craig McDermott. His umpiring colleague was Darrell Hair.

About the 1990–91 England tour, England spinner Phil Tufnell wrote in his biography that McConnell replied "Count them yerself, yer Pommy bastard" when he was asked by Tufnell how many balls were left in the over.

McConnell umpired 68 One Day International (ODI) matches between 1983 and 1992. He umpired two women's Test matches, in 1977 and 1984 respectively. Altogether, he umpired 82 first-class matches between 1977 and 1992, the Test match noted above being his last.

McConnell died on 30 October 2025 at the age of 80.

== See also ==
- List of Test cricket umpires
- List of One Day International cricket umpires
