= Craig McDermott =

Australian cricketer

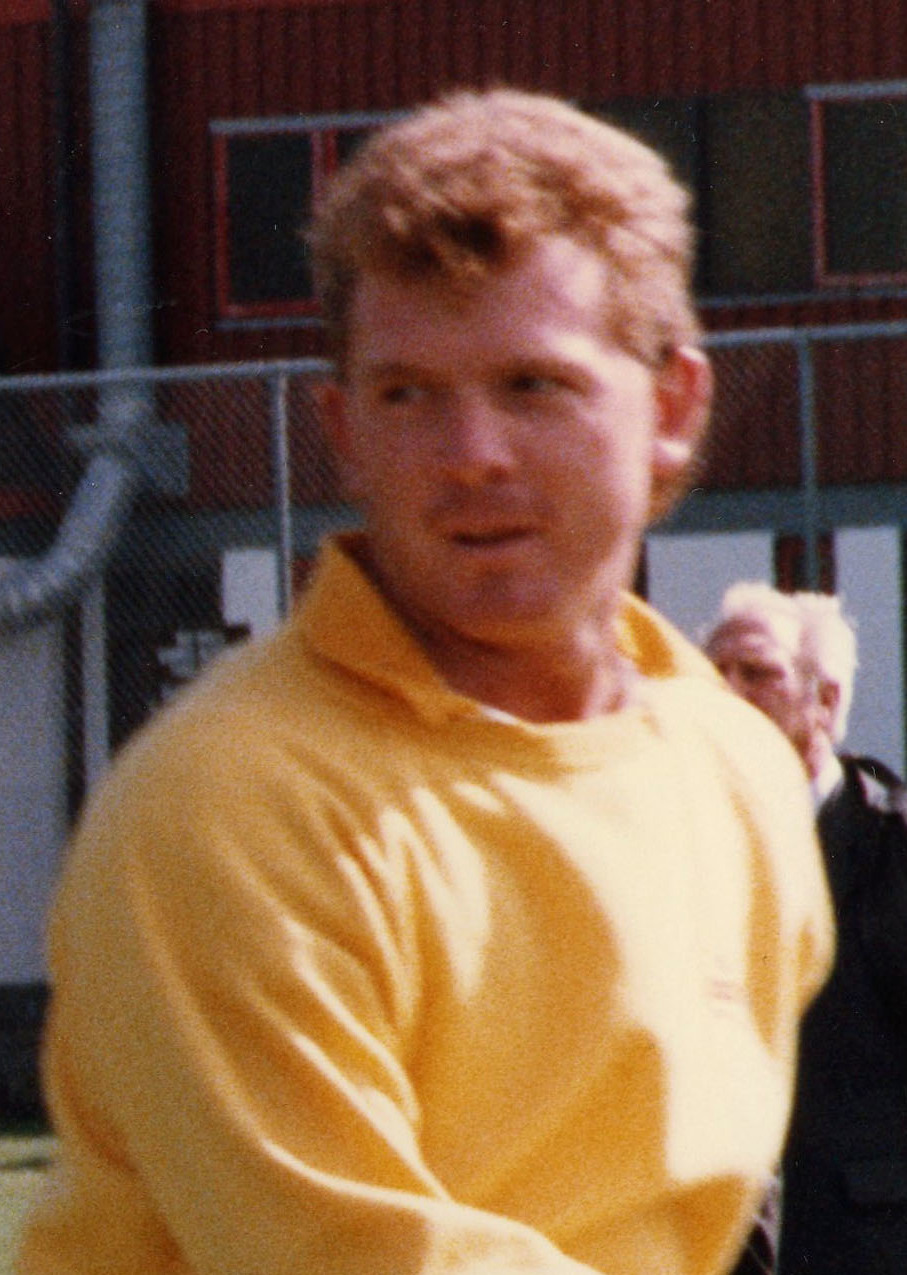
- McDermott in 1986

Personal information
- Full name: Craig John McDermott
- Born: 14 April 1965 (age 61); Ipswich, Queensland, Australia
- Nickname: Billy
- Height: 191 cm (6 ft 3 in)
- Batting: Right-handed
- Bowling: Right-arm fast
- Role: Bowler
- Relatives: Alister McDermott (son); Ben McDermott (son)

International information
- National side: Australia
- Test debut (cap 328): 22 December 1984 v West Indies
- Last Test: 25 January 1996 v Sri Lanka
- ODI debut (cap 82): 6 January 1985 v West Indies
- Last ODI: 23 February 1996 v Kenya
- ODI shirt no.: 15

Domestic team information
- Years: Team
- 1983/84–1995/96: Queensland

Career statistics
Competition	Test	ODI
Matches	71	138
Runs scored	940	432
Batting average	12.20	7.08
100s/50s	0/0	0/0
Top score	42*	37
Balls bowled	16,586	7,461
Wickets	291	203
Bowling average	28.63	24.71
5 wickets in innings	14	1
10 wickets in match	2	0
Best bowling	8/97	5/44
Catches/stumpings	19/0	27/0
Medal record
Men's Cricket
Representing Australia
ICC Cricket World Cup
Winner	1987 India and Pakistan
Runner-up	1996 India-Pakistan-Sri Lanka
- Source: Cricinfo, 19 July 2005

Craig John McDermott (born 14 April 1965) is a former Australian cricketer. Between 1984 and 1996 he played 71 Tests for Australia, taking 291 wickets. Following the end of his playing career, he was the bowling coach for the Australian team for two spells between 2011 and 2016. McDermott was a part of the Australian team that won their first world title during the 1987 Cricket World Cup.

== International career ==
McDermott was the spearhead of the Australian attack in the late 1980s and early 1990s. He was powerfully built at 191 cm tall. He started his career with Queensland in 1983–84 and made his Test match debut in 1984–85 whilst still 19 against West Indies (his youth engendering his nickname "Billy" – from Billy the Kid). In his first Ashes tour of 1985, he took 30 wickets. But he was over-bowled and was burnt out. He had an excellent World Cup in 1987, helping Australia win the trophy. He took 18 wickets in the tournament, including 5/44 in the semi-final win over Pakistan.

McDermott was a rhythm bowler, and when this was right, he would have an aggressive approach to the wicket and an excellent sideways-on action, giving him sharp pace and outswing. He always saved his best for England, taking 32 wickets in the last full series that he was able to play before injuries took over. Injuries seemed to hit him at wrong times, and he missed the history-making West Indies tour of 1995, and most of the 1996 World Cup. He also missed most of the 1993 Ashes tour when Shane Warne and Merv Hughes shared the spoils in his absence. His best bowling analysis in Tests is 8/97 against England in 1991. He ended with 291 wickets from 70 Tests and 203 one-day wickets with the best analysis being the 5/44.

In batting, even though McDermott's average was that of a tail-ender, he could still hit the ball with power and could stand his ground against fast bowling. In two of the closest Tests that Australia lost, McDermott played a key role with the bat. In January 1993, Australia lost by 1 run to West Indies when McDermott, on 18 and batting with stout resistance, was given out controversially when attempting to play a bouncer from Courtney Walsh. In January 1994, he was on 29 not out in the Test against South Africa that Australia lost by 5 runs in chasing 117.

As a fieldsman, McDermott was renowned for his powerful and accurate returns to the wicket-keeper from the outfield. The New Zealand player and administrator Walter Hadlee regarded McDermott as the best thrower-in he had ever seen.

=== Five-wicket hauls ===
McDermott's five-wicket hauls in Tests
Against	Home	Away
England	6	2
India	3	-
New Zealand	1	-
Pakistan	1	-
West Indies	-	1

In cricket, a five-wicket haul (also known as a "five–for" or "fifer") refers to a bowler taking five or more wickets in a single innings. This is regarded as a notable achievement, and as of August 2015 only 43 bowlers have taken 15 or more five-wicket hauls at the international level. Craig John McDermott is a former Australian cricketer who, according to the sports journalist Greg Baum, was "Australia's premier strike bowler in the early 1990s". A right-arm fast bowler, he played 71 Test matches and 138 ODIs in his career, taking 291 and 203 wickets respectively. He took fourteen five-wicket hauls in Test cricket, including two in a single ten-wicket match, and one in the ODI format.

McDermott made his Test match debut for Australia against the West Indies at the Melbourne Cricket Ground in December 1984, with Richie Richardson being his first Test victim. His first Test five-wicket haul came at Lord's in the second Test of the 1985 Ashes series in June of that year, taking 6 wickets for 70 runs in a 4-wicket victory for Australia. McDermott's best bowling analysis in Test cricket is 8 for 97 against England in the fifth Test of the 1990–91 Ashes series. He was most successful against England, taking eight of his fourteen five-wicket hauls against them, including four during the 1994–95 Ashes in which he was named player of the series.

McDermott's ODI debut came against the West Indies at the Melbourne Cricket Ground in January 1985. He did not bat and although he took the wicket of Viv Richards, Australia lost the game by seven wickets. McDermott played 138 ODIs, and took a solitary five-wicket haul against Pakistan in November 1987, in the Cricket World Cup semi-final. His figures of 5 for 44, and an Australian victory by 18 runs, saw him awarded man of the match as Australia progressed to the final.

== Coaching career ==
On 12 May 2011, it was announced that McDermott had been appointed the new bowling coach for the Australian cricket team replacing Troy Cooley. On 11 May 2012, McDermott announced his resignation as Australia's bowling coach, citing the heavy touring schedule as the reason. Craig McDermott has been appointed as the new bowling coach and consultant for the Ireland cricket team. In November 2012, he announced that he would be opening a fast-bowling clinic.

McDermott returned to a coaching role with the Australian cricket team on a two-year contract in May 2014.

== Personal life ==
McDermott's sons, Alister McDermott and Ben McDermott are cricketers, playing for Queensland and Tasmania, respectively.
