= 1993–94 Australia Tri-Nation Series =

International cricket tournament

1993–94 World Series
- Date: 9 December 1993 – 25 January 1994
- Location: Australia
- Result: Australia won the series
- Player of the series: Shane Warne (Australia)
Teams
Australia	New Zealand	South Africa
Captains
Allan Border	Ken Rutherford	Kepler Wessels
Most runs
Mark Waugh (391)	Andrew Jones (318)	Gary Kirsten (312)
Most wickets
Shane Warne (20)	Chris Pringle (16)	Fanie de Villiers (15)

The 1993–94 Australia Tri-Nation Series (more commonly known as the 1993–94 World Series) was a One Day International (ODI) tri-series cricket tournament in Australia. The host nation's cricket team played matches against New Zealand and South Africa at six venues across Australia.

The tournament featured a quadruple round-robin tournament, with the matches being split into two groups of six matches each, and two test matches in the South African series being played at the halfway point. After twelve matches were played, Australia finished on top and took on South Africa, which finished just ahead of New Zealand by net run rate after they were both tied at seven points apiece.

In the final series, after losing the first match at the Melbourne Cricket Ground, Australia went on to win the remaining two matches played at the Sydney Cricket Ground, winning 2-1 and recording their eighth title. Mark Waugh, from Australia, finished as the leading run scorer of the tournament, with 391 runs, while teammate Shane Warne was the leading wicket-taker, with 20 wickets.

== Squads ==
Australia	New Zealand	South Africa
Allan Border (c); David Boon; Matthew Hayden; Ian Healy; Tim May; Craig McDermott; Glenn McGrath; Paul Reiffel; Michael Slater; Mark Taylor; Shane Warne; Mark Waugh; Steve Waugh	Ken Rutherford (c); Mark Greatbatch (vc); Tony Blain; Chris Cairns; Richard de Groen; Chris Harris; Andrew Jones; Gavin Larsen; Rod Latham; Danny Morrison; Dipak Patel; Blair Pocock; Chris Pringle; Shane Thomson; Bryan Young	Kepler Wessels (c); Dave Callaghan; Hansie Cronje; Darryl Cullinan; Fanie de Villiers; Allan Donald; Andrew Hudson; Gary Kirsten; Craig Matthews; Jonty Rhodes; Dave Richardson; Dave Rundle; Richard Snell; Errol Stewart; Pat Symcox

== Tournament summary ==
=== First half ===
The series began in Melbourne under a warning, after the debacle of the warm-up match between Victoria and South Africa, which saw the run-ups being covered by rubber mats. The South Africans won the opening match of the tournament by seven wickets, with a 140-run partnership between Kepler Wessels (70) and Hansie Cronje (91) securing the victory. This was despite Australia bringing in Shane Warne after Tim May was ruled out with a hamstring muscle strain. After the match at Adelaide Oval between New Zealand and South Africa was washed out without a ball being played, Australia recorded their first victory of the series as they defeated New Zealand by eight wickets. This was due to part to Glenn McGrath and Warne each taking four wickets as they bowled New Zealand out for only 135, and in part to Matthew Hayden scoring a half-century in what was first ODI in Australia.

When the tournament moved to Sydney, Australia recorded their second victory in a row with a rout of South Africa on a pitch that Captain Allan Border called "shocking". This was after South Africa was bowled for 69, with Paul Reiffel taking four wickets for 13 runs in his eight overs to lose by 103 runs. Australia went on to win the match played at Melbourne, with the host team winning by 3 runs over New Zealand on the back of an 81-run innings from Mark Taylor, as Steve Waugh tore a hamstring and was ruled out for the first two tests against South Africa. In Hobart, South Africa could only muster 7/147 from their fifty overs on what The Age described as a 200-run pitch. This was helped by good bowling from man-of-the-match Gavin Larsen (2/12) and Chris Pringle (3/28). New Zealand, with Bryan Young the top scorer with 74, chased the target with four wickets to spare.

=== Second half ===
After the first two tests of the South African series were played in Melbourne and Sydney, the tournament restarted at the Gabba, in Brisbane, for the second half of the tournament. New Zealand, with the partnership of Shane Thomson (68) and Chris Cairns (70), would get to 7/256, which would be the highest score of the tournament. They would go on to win by nine runs in a revised target of 227, despite Peter Kirsten (97). South Africa would suffer another defeat, this time to Australia only one day later, as 98 runs in 158 minutes from Dean Jones led Australia to a 48-run win. The following match, played at the Sydney Cricket Ground, saw a controversial not-out call when umpire Steve Davis rejected a straight forward catch from Ken Rutherford batting to Shane Warne. Allan Border stated that it was an out and called for the umpires to use common sense. This call would later be costly, with Rutherford scoring 65 and, with the help of Chris Pringle who took four wickets, leading New Zealand to a 13-run win over Australia.

Two matches were then played at Perth's WACA. In the first match, three wickets from Brian McMillan and Allan Donald (two being in the first over) helped South Africa record a five-wicket victory with twenty overs left to spare as they chased down the 151 set by New Zealand. The second match was another South African victory, this time over a weakened Australia, which didn't have Ian Healy as wicket keeper, as he had been replaced by Tim Zoehrer. Other health issues included Peter Kirsten being hit on the side of the face, with X-ray scans showing two fractures of his cheek bone. The final match of the group stage saw an 121-run partnership between Boon and Dean Jones, as they led Australia to 3/217 on a slow outfield. In response, New Zealand could muster only 166, with Bryan Young the top scorer with 45, as Warne took three wickets. This meant that South Africa qualified through to the finals by net run rate.

=== Final series ===
The final series of matches started at the Melbourne Cricket Ground, with Craig McDermott being brought back into the lineup for Australia, while Peter Kirsten was put in the lineup for South Africa despite the facial bone fractures he received in the previous match. In the opening match, a century from Gary Kirsten and a five-wicket haul from Richard Snell guided the visitors to a 28-run victory, as they opened up a 1–0 series lead heading into the Sydney matches. The first match of two at the Sydney Cricket Ground saw a partnership of 175 between Mark Waugh (107) and Jones (79) as they led Australia to 6/247 from their fifty overs. "Purple patch" performances from bowlers Warne (3/4 from 15 balls) and McDermott (3/6 from eight balls) would help in bowling out South Africa for 178, 69 runs short of the target. This was despite a half century from Jonty Rhodes. The final match saw Australia win by 35 runs in Border's 100th match as captain in the tri-series. Half centuries from Mark Waugh (who was named player of the final series) and Boon got Australia to 223, which South Africa wouldn't reach as they only scored 9/188.

== Points table ==
Pos	Team	Pld	W	L	T	NR	Pts	NRR
1	Australia	8	5	3	0	0	10	0.363
2	South Africa	8	3	4	0	1	7	−0.066
3	New Zealand	8	3	4	0	1	7	−0.435

Source: Cricinfo

== Results ==
9 December (D/N)
Scoreboard

Australia; 189 (45.5 overs)	v	South Africa; 3/190 (48.4 overs)
Michael Slater 73 (69); Fanie de Villiers 3/30 (7.5 overs)		Hansie Cronje 91* (147); Craig McDermott 2/31 (10 overs)

South Africa won by 7 wickets
Melbourne Cricket Ground, Melbourne
Attendance: 58,030
Umpires: Bill Sheahan (AUS) and Terry Prue (AUS)

- Glenn McGrath and Michael Slater (Aus) made their ODI debuts

11 December
Scoreboard

New Zealand	v	South Africa

Match abandoned
Adelaide Oval, Adelaide

- Constant rain throughout the day saw the match being Abandoned.

12 December
Scoreboard

New Zealand; 135 (48.2 overs)	v	Australia; 2/136 (38.5 overs)
Chris Cairns 31 (67); Shane Warne 4/25 (10)		David Boon 51* (90); Chris Pringle 1/18 (8)

Australia won by 8 wickets
Adelaide Oval, Adelaide
Attendance: 16,865
Umpires: Bill Sheahan (AUS) and Tony McQuillan (AUS)
Player of the match: Shane Warne (Australia)

14 December (D/N)
Scoreboard

Australia; 9/172 (50 overs)	v	South Africa; 69 (28 overs)
Ian Healy 38 (60); Craig Matthews 3/23 (10)		Hansie Cronje 20 (47); Paul Reiffel 4/13 (8)

Australia won by 103 runs
Sydney Cricket Ground, Sydney
Attendance: 39,634
Umpires: Darrell Hair (AUS) and Peter Parker (AUS)
Player of the match: Paul Reiffel (Australia)

- Gary Kirsten (RSA) made their ODI debut

16 December (D/N)
Scoreboard

Australia; 5/202 (50 overs)	v	New Zealand; 9/199 (50 overs)
Mark Taylor 81 (129); Richard de Groen 2/40 (10)		Shane Thomson 42 (41); Shane Warne 4/19 (10)

Australia won by 3 runs
Melbourne Cricket Ground, Melbourne
Attendance: 25,893
Umpires: Leonard King (AUS) and Tony McQuillan (AUS)
Player of the match: Shane Warne (Australia)

- Richard de Groen (NZL) made their ODI debut

18 December
Scoreboard

South Africa; 7/147 (50 overs)	v	New Zealand; 6/148 (44.1 overs)
Dave Richardson 38* (63); Chris Pringle 3/28 (10)		Bryan Young 74 (116); Craig Matthews 4/38 (10)

New Zealand won by 4 wickets
Bellerive Oval, Hobart
Attendance: 3,957
Umpires: Steve Davis (AUS) and Steve Randell (AUS)
Player of the match: Gavin Larsen (New Zealand)

8 January
Scoreboard

New Zealand; 7/256 (50 overs)	v	South Africa; 8/219 (39 overs)
Chris Cairns 70 (54); Allan Donald 2/38 (8)		Peter Kirsten 97 (108); Chris Pringle 3/38 (8)

New Zealand won by 9 runs (revised)
Gabba, Brisbane
Attendance: 7,477
Umpires: Col Timmins (AUS) and Ian Thomas (AUS)
Player of the match: Peter Kirsten (South Africa)

- Rain restricted the South African innings to 39 overs.

9 January
Scoreboard

Australia; 9/230 (50 overs)	v	South Africa; 182 (46.5 overs)
Dean Jones 98 (124); Dave Rundle 4/42 (9)		Gary Kirsten 51 (88); Glenn McGrath 4/24 (8.5)

Australia won by 48 runs
Gabba, Brisbane
Attendance: 17,223
Umpires: Darrell Hair (AUS) and Tony McQuillan (AUS)
Player of the match: Dean Jones (Australia)

- Dave Rundle (RSA) made their ODI debut

11 January (D/N)
Scoreboard

New Zealand; 9/198 (50 overs)	v	Australia; 185 (48.3 overs)
Ken Rutherford 65 (90); Glenn McGrath 3/29 (10)		David Boon 67 (121); Chris Pringle 4/40 (9.3)

New Zealand won by 13 runs
Sydney Cricket Ground, Sydney
Umpires: Steve Davis (AUS) and Steve Randell (AUS)
Player of the match: Chris Pringle (New Zealand)

14 January
Scoreboard

New Zealand; 150 (44.2 overs)	v	South Africa; 5/151 (30.3 overs)
Tony Blain 32 (46); Allan Donald 3/15 (8.2)		Peter Kirsten 50 (83); Chris Pringle 3/24 (8.3)

South Africa won by 5 wickets
WACA Ground, Perth
Attendance: 14,810
Umpires: Daryl Harper (AUS) and Ric Evans (AUS)
Player of the match: Allan Donald (South Africa)

- The key used for the pitch report got stuck in a crack of the pitch used the ODI and was there for a few days afterwards

16 January
Scoreboard

South Africa; 7/208 (50 overs)	v	Australia; 126 (41 overs)
Gary Kirsten 55 (102); Mark Waugh 2/26 (7)		Mark Taylor 29 (56); Richard Snell 3/27 (7)

South Africa won by 82 runs
WACA Ground, Perth
Attendance: 28,211
Umpires: Bill Sheahan (AUS) and Terry Prue (AUS)
Player of the match: Dave Callaghan (South Africa)

- Damien Fleming (Aus) made their ODI debut

19 January (D/N)
Scoreboard

Australia; 3/217 (50 overs)	v	New Zealand; 166 (47.5 overs)
Dean Jones 82 (120); Willie Watson 1/33 (10)		Bryan Young 43 (96); Shane Warne 3/28 (10)

Australia won by 51 runs
Melbourne Cricket Ground, Melbourne
Umpires: Peter Parker (AUS) and Steve Randell (AUS)
Player of the match: Dean Jones (Australia)

== Final series ==
21 January (D/N)
Scoreboard

South Africa; 5/230 (50 overs)	v	Australia; 202 (48.5 overs)
Gary Kirsten 112* (137); Glenn McGrath 2/52 (9)		David Boon 45 (78); Richard Snell 5/40 (9.5)

South Africa won by 28 runs
Melbourne Cricket Ground, Melbourne
Umpires: Bill Sheahan (AUS) and Terry Prue (AUS)

23 January (D/N)
Scoreboard

Australia; 6/247 (50 overs)	v	South Africa; 178 (45.5 overs)
Mark Waugh 107 (111); Allan Donald 4/40 (10)		Jonty Rhodes 52 (59); Craig McDermott 3/39 (8.5)

Australia won by 69 runs
Sydney Cricket Ground, Sydney
Attendance: 39,808
Umpires: Darrell Hair (AUS) and Steve Randell (AUS)

25 January (D/N)
Scoreboard

Australia; 8/223 (50 overs)	v	South Africa; 9/188 (50 overs)
David Boon 64 (98); Fanie de Villiers 2/41 (10)		Jonty Rhodes 43 (68); Shane Warne 2/36 (10)

Australia won by 35 runs
Sydney Cricket Ground, Sydney
Attendance: 37,722
Umpires: Darrell Hair (AUS) and Steve Randell (AUS)

== Statistics ==
Mark Waugh finished the tournament with the most runs in the series, 524, which included a century in the second final against South Africa. He finished ahead of fellow Australian batsmen David Boon and Dean Jones. South African players Gary Kirsten and Hansie Cronje rounded out the top five. Shane Warne ended the series as the leading wicket taker, with 20 wickets from ten matches. He was followed by fellow Australian Glenn McGrath, who ended up with the same number of wickets as Kiwi bowler Chris Pringle. South African Fanie de Villiers and Australian Paul Reiffel rounded out the top five.

=== Most runs ===
Player	Team	Matches	Innings	Not Out	Runs	HS	Average	100s	50s
Mark Waugh	Australia	11	11	1	395	107	39.50	1	2
David Boon	Australia	11	11	1	381	67	38.10	0	4
Dean Jones	Australia	7	7	0	318	98	45.43	0	3
Gary Kirsten	South Africa	8	8	0	312	112*	39.00	1	2
Hansie Cronje	South Africa	10	10	1	284	91*	31.56	0	1

=== Most wickets ===
Player	Team	Matches	Overs	Runs	Wickets	Average	BBI
Shane Warne	Australia	10	80	265	20	13.25	4/19
Glenn McGrath	Australia	8	71.5	276	16	17.25	4/24
Chris Pringle	New Zealand	7	63	219	16	13.69	4/40
Fanie de Villiers	South Africa	10	92	298	15	19.87	3/30
Paul Reiffel	Australia	11	89.5	291	12	24.25	4/13
