= New Zealand cricket team in Australia in 1993–94 =

International cricket tour

1993–94 Trans-Tasman Trophy
	Australia	New Zealand
- Dates: 12 November 1993 – 7 December 1993
Captains	Allan Border	Martin Crowe (1st test); Ken Rutherford (2nd and 3rd test)

Test series
- Result: Australia won the 3-match series 2–0
Most runs	Michael Slater (305)	Andrew Jones (324)
Most wickets	Shane Warne (18)	Chris Cairns (5)

The New Zealand national cricket team toured Australia in the 1993–94 season to play in three test matches against Australia before playing in a tri-series with South Africa. The tour began on October 19, in Perth, Western Australia, against an Australian Chairman XI as they played in five warm-up matches before the test matches in Perth, Hobart and Brisbane. New Zealand were captained by Martin Crowe while the Australians were captain by Allan Border.

Before the first test, the tourists played in five tour matches, three first-class and two list A matches. In the first test which was played at the WACA Ground, centuries from Ian Healy, Mark Taylor and Andrew Jones would see the match end in a draw. New Zealand than suffering their biggest innings defeat in their history in the second test held at the Bellerive Oval. After Australia had scored 6/544, New Zealand was bowled out for 161 in both innings to lose by an innings and 222 runs. The final test match held at the Brisbane Cricket Ground saw the same result with Australia winning by an innings to take out the Trans-Tasman Trophy 2–0. Kiwi batsman, Andrew Jones was the top run-scorer of the series with 324 runs while Shane Warne was the leading wicket-taker in the series with 18 wickets.

== Background ==
Heading into the tour, the Australians had previously head over to England for the 1993 Ashes Series as they won the series 4–1 which saw the batting of David Boon, Mark Waugh, Allan Border all scoring over 430 runs throughout the test series. Another critical factor for Australia was Shane Warne who claimed 34 wickets throughout the series as he was aided by Merv Hughes (31 wickets) who wouldn't be selected for the test series against New Zealand. New Zealand's last series was against Australia at home when they tied the series in the tests before only just losing the ODI Series 3–2.

== Squads ==
Tests
Australia	New Zealand
Allan Border (c); David Boon; Ian Healy (wk); Tim May; Craig McDermott; Glenn McGrath; Paul Reiffel; Michael Slater; Mark Taylor; Shane Warne; Mark Waugh; Steve Waugh	Martin Crowe (c); Tony Blain; Chris Cairns; Simon Doull; Mark Greatbatch; Chris Harris; Richard Jones; Danny Morrison; Dipak Patel; Blair Pocock; Ken Rutherford; Murphy Su'a; David White; Willie Watson; Bryan Young; Richard de Groen

On the 27 October 1993, David White was selected to fly into Australia as a backup to Mark Greatbatch who was carrying an injury leading into the test series. The first test squad for Australia was revealed on the 9 November, with a call-up to debutant Glenn McGrath who had only played eight first-class matches for New South Wales. After the first test match, Martin Crowe returned home after an injury to his left knee. Ken Rutherford would replace Crowe as the captain for New Zealand in the remaining two tests.

== Tour matches ==
=== New Zealand vs. ACB Chairman XI ===
The opening tour match for New Zealand took place at the Lilac Hill in Perth against an ACB Chairman XI which featured Jeff Thomson, Dennis Lillee and Richard Hadlee who were all over forty years old. After forcing New Zealand to be 8/91 at one stage, a ninth wicket partnership between Blair Pocock and Willie Watson rescued New Zealand to a score of 189. In the run-chase, Damien Martyn top scored with 81 as he got the man of the match award as he led the Chairman team to a six wicket victory.

19 October 1993
Scorecard

New Zealanders; 189 (47.4 overs)	v	(Australia) ACB Chairman XI; 4/192 (43.2 overs)
Blair Pocock 68 (122); Jeff Thomson 2/13 (4 overs)		Damien Martyn 81* (98); Dipak Patel 3/37 (10 overs)

ACB Chairman XI won by 6 wickets
Lilac Hill, Perth
Umpires: Ross Emerson and C Reynolds
Player of the match: Damien Martyn (ACB)

- ACB Chairman's XI won the toss and elected to field first.

=== New Zealand vs. Western Australia ===
New Zealand stayed in Perth to play their second warm-up against a Western Australia side. Batting first, New Zealand was bowled out for 149 with Western Australian bowler, Jo Angel taking five wickets for 32. In response, Western Australia scored 508 with a partnership of 185 runs from test-fringe hopefuls, Damien Martyn (80) and Tom Moody (110) being completed in only 214 minutes. Tim Zoehrer also chipped in with a solid 83 as he pushed the total past 500. In the second innings, half-centuries from Andrew Jones, Ken Rutherford and Dipak Patel got New Zealand to 350 with Jo Angel taking another five wickets as Western Australia won by an innings and nine runs. The match though would see Justin Langer fined $300 for refusing to walk after being dismissed with Martin Crowe doing a similar response the following day.

21–24 October 1993
Scorecard

New Zealanders	v	Western Australia
149 (76.1 overs); Andrew Jones 47; Jo Angel 5/32 (20.1)		508 (135.5 overs); Tom Moody 110; Murphy Su'a 4/84 (31.5 overs)
350 (125.4 overs); Andrew Jones 67; Jo Angel 5/108 (34)

Western Australia won by an innings and 9 runs
WACA Ground, Perth
Umpires: Ric Evans and Terry Prue

- Western Australia won the toss and elected to field.

=== New Zealand vs. AIS Cricket Academy XI ===
New Zealand headed over to North Sydney Oval to take on a Cricket Academy XI which featured Glenn McGrath who would go on to play in his first test later in the tour. For the tourists, they would have their third loss of the tour with only a Tony Blain 40 resembling some fight in the 110 run defeat. Chris Cairns being the best New Zealand bowler with 4/39.

27 October 1993
Scorecard

ACB Cricket Academy XI (Australia); 241 (49.1 overs)	v	New Zealanders; 131 (42.2 overs)
Jason Arnberger 79; Chris Cairns 4/39 (10 overs)		Tony Blain 40; Phil Alley 2/17 (8 overs)

ACB Cricket Academy XI won by 110 runs
North Sydney Oval, Sydney
Umpires: PE Dodd and K Duffy

- ACB Cricket Academy XI won the toss and elected to bat.

=== New Zealand vs. New South Wales ===
Two days later, New Zealand took on New South Wales in a four-day first-class match played at the No. 1 Sports Ground in Newcastle. The opening day of the tour match saw a partnership of 119 between Mark Waugh (63) and Steve Waugh (88) before Dipak Patel brought the game back with 6/87 from 23 consecutive overs to bring New South Wales from 3/218 to declare at 8/299. New Zealand first innings didn't get going with Martin Crowe maintaining his bad form as he scored 12 runs in his innings. Eventually a 65 run innings from Ken Rutherford pushed New Zealand to 163 in their first innings. With a target of 246 runs for victory after New South Wales collapsed for 109 in the second innings, New Zealand chased down the target with three wickets to spare with Danny Morrison and Tony Blain contributing the remaining runs on the fourth day.

29 October–1 November 1993
Scorecard

New South Wales	v	New Zealanders
8/299d (91 overs); Steve Waugh 88; Dipak Patel 6/87 (23 overs)		163 (69.5 overs); Ken Rutherford 65; Greg Matthews 4/52 (15.5)
109 (33 overs); Mark Taylor 30; Danny Morrison 6/35 (10)		7/247 (107.2 overs); Ken Rutherford 47; Brad McNamara 2/37 (16)

New Zealanders won by 3 wickets
No. 1 Sports Ground, Newcastle
Umpires: DB Hair and IS Thomas

- New South Wales won the toss and elected to bat.

=== New Zealand vs. Tasmania ===
The final tour match before the first test saw New Zealand head down to Launceston for a four-day game against Tasmania at the NTCA Ground. After New Zealand won the toss and elected to field, Tasmanian batsman David Boon only lasted ten minutes in his first match of the season. The contribution was shared between the Tasmanian batsman with batsman getting starts before getting out. Only Shaun Young and Mark Atkinson contributed half-centuries while Chris Cairns took five wickets. New Zealand responded with 7/215 before declaring as Andrew Jones top-scored with 67 before running himself out late in the second day. This was followed up by another declaration from Tasmania in their second innings with Ricky Ponting top-scoring for Tasmania with 54 as David Boon only scored 21 as he was out early in his innings. Chasing 299 for victory, Martin Crowe was dropped twice (on 17 and 46) as he went on to score his 53rd century and his first of the tour as he top scored with 105. But the match would end in a draw with New Zealand scoring 7/247 with Troy Cooley being the pick of the bowlers with two wickets.

4–7 November 1993
Scorecard

Tasmania	v	New Zealanders
9/306d (100 overs); Shaun Young 77; Chris Cairns 5/105 (32 overs)		7/215d (91 overs); Andrew Jones 67; Chris Matthews 2/37 (19)
6/207d (72 overs); Ricky Ponting 54; Mark Haslam 3/64 (24)		7/247 (78 overs); Martin Crowe 105; Troy Cooley 2/33 (13)

Match drawn
NTCA Ground, Launceston
Umpires: TR Hogarth and SG Randell

- New Zealand won the toss and elected to field.

=== New Zealand vs. South Australia ===
During the break between the first and second test, New Zealand played in a four day practice match against a South Australia eleven at Adelaide Oval. Despite winning the toss, the South Australia were bowled out for 158 with Doull claiming six wickets. In response, they declared on 6/276 with Damion Reevees being the pick of the bowlers with 4/62 with leg-spinner Peter McIntyre not bowling after chipping his right forefinger while batting. After the New Zealand innings was closed during Day 3, South Australia reached 9/260 with James Brayshaw top scoring with 94 in the innings which took four hours in what The Age called it the 'blandest 247' at the end of Day 3. New Zealand would go on to chase down the target of 144 that was set which was set by a 131 run opening stand between Greatbatch (64) and Pocock (60). This was despite South Australia taking three late wickets for only four runs with Patel securing the victory with a single.

19–22 November 1993
Scorecard

South Australia	v	New Zealanders
158 (50.5 overs); Joe Scuderi 51; Simon Doull 6/55 (17.5 overs)		6/276d (97 overs); Ken Rutherford 67; Damion Reeves 4/62 (19)
9/260d (100.5 overs); James Brayshaw 94; Richard de Groen 3/50 (24)		3/143 (55.5 overs); Mark Greatbatch 64; Brad Wigney 2/24 (10)

New Zealanders won by 7 wickets
Adelaide Oval, Adelaide
Umpires: SJ Davis, DJ Harper and RB Woods

- South Australia won the toss and elected to bat.

== Test series ==
=== 1st Test ===
12–16 November 1993
Scorecard

Australia	v	New Zealand
398 (114.5 overs); Ian Healy 113* (181); Chris Cairns 4/113 (28 overs)		9/419dec (159.1 overs); Andrew Jones 143 (283); Craig McDermott 3/127 (40 overs)
1/323dec (87 overs); Mark Taylor 142* (255); Dipak Patel 1/144 (39 overs)		4/166 (62 overs); Andrew Jones 45 (77); Steve Waugh 1/10 (7 overs)

Match drawn
WACA Ground, Perth
Umpires: Darrell Hair and Tony McQuillan
Player of the match: Andrew Jones (New Zealand)

- New Zealand won the toss and elected to field.
- Glenn McGrath (AUS) and Blair Pocock (NZ) made their Test debuts.
- Craig McDermott took his 200th test wicket.

Heading into the first test, Mark Greatbatch was brought back into the test side after damaging his finger earlier in the tour as David White went home due to a torn knee cartilage from the match against Tasmania. New Zealand coach stated before the match "For Australia, the Ashes tour of England is the big tour; this is the equivalent of an Ashes tour for us." The first test saw two players made their test debutant with Kiwi batsman, Blair Pocock opening the batting while Glenn McGrath debut for Australia.

The match started two hours later than the schedule time after overnight rain vividly made the pitch greener as the curators prolong the close-mowing to remove the green smear that was on the pitch. Selecting to bowl first, Cairns rifled the Australian batsman with his first delivery striking Michael Slater in the midriff because taking the wicket of Slater and in the next ball, Boon to put Australia 2/37. After preventing the hat-trick, Steve Waugh with opening batsman Mark Taylor (who would go on to make 63) dug in to bring the score up to 100 as the Australians would make 6/229 at the end of stumps which was drawn an hour late. The following day, Ian Healy recorded his second century of his test career which after the end of the day, he stated, "It was a little gesture to my father, Neville, whose father passed away yesterday,". He was guided by some late order hitting from Paul Reiffel (51) and Craig McDermott (35) as he guided Australia to 398 from the position of 6/198 at one stage.

McGrath recorded his first test wicket with his 27th ball as New Zealand loss Mark Greatbach for 18. Blair Pocock was the next to fall on 34 with Jones ending the day on 62* with New Zealand being at 2/123 at stumps. Jones would go on to score 143 before being dismissed by Mark Waugh caught behind. Cairns also contributed to the bat with 66 (would go on to reach 78) which included a six over mid-off from Shane Warne's bowling in what was his highest test score. Ken Rutherford (17) though would contribute to being Craig McDermott's 200th wicket. The fourth day would see New Zealand declare on 9/419 with Watson tearing a hamstring while running for a single which prevented him from bowling the rest of the match.

Australia's second innings saw the team only lose one wicket through the entire innings with the wicket of Michael Slater falling on 99 after he feathered a delivery from Patel into the gloves of Patel. A century from Mark Taylor saw Australia declare on 1/323 from their 87 overs with Greg Baum from The Age stating that they batted on for at least half an hour too long. This forced the match into a draw with New Zealand only getting to 166 before the match was declared a draw. For Crowe it was his last match of the tour with the pain in his left knee being more intolerable throughout the test match as he missed the remaining two test matches with Rutherford becoming captain.

=== 2nd Test ===
26–29 November 1993
Scorecard

Australia	v	New Zealand
6/544dec (139 overs); Michael Slater 168 (235); Richard de Groen 2/113 (36 overs)		161 (82.3 overs); Andrew Jones 47 (169); Tim May 5/65 (31.3 overs)
		161 (f/o) (77.5 overs); Ken Rutherford 55 (97); Shane Warne 6/31 (19.5 overs)

Australia won by an innings and 222 runs
Bellerive Oval, Hobart
Umpires: Darrell Hair and Bill Sheahan
Player of the match: Mark Waugh (Australia)

- Australia won the toss and elected to bat.
- The match was scheduled for five days but completed in four.
- Richard de Groen (NZ) made his Test debut.

Leading into the test, Australia made one change to their eleven with Glenn McGrath being dropped for Tim May. For New Zealand, they made two changes with Richard de Groen appearing in his first test with Chris Harris replacing Crowe due to injury. Batting first, the Australians dominated the opening day of the test as New Zealand had five missed chances for only two wickets in return. For Australia, Slater's footwork was nimble and after almost a run-out on 99, lead the batting with 168 run innings. David Boon recorded his 18th century with the television stations not automatically switching over to the news as it took him seven minutes to go from 99 to 100. He would only score one more run on the second day with Australia eventually declaring on 6/544 with Mark Waugh becoming the third Australian in the innings to get a century as he made 111 runs over 139 balls. Only Richard de Groen took more than one wicket in the Australian innings, getting Mark Waugh and Healy out.

With the winds swirling on the Derwent, Australia dropped three catches with Healy, Boon and Warne all dropping catches at certain intervals with New Zealand ending the second day on 2/81. Disaster though would strike on the third day for New Zealand as they collapsed, losing eight wickets for only 80 runs to be bowled out for 161. Tim May taking a five wicket haul for the Aussies as Shane Warne broke the spin-bowling record for a calendar year with 59 wickets. Only Andrew Jones and Tony Blain mustered any residence to the spin bowling of May and Warne. New Zealand was force to follow-on and by the end of the day finished on 5/127 with Ken Ruthford scoring a half-century before being bowled by Warne. The match would end before lunch on Day 4 with Warne taking four wickets while only conceding three runs as he finished with figures of 6/31 as New Zealand was bowled out for 161. For New Zealand this was their heaviest defeat with the previous record being in the 1962-63 tour against England where they lost by 215 runs.

=== 3rd Test ===
3–7 December 1993
Scorecard

New Zealand	v	Australia
233 (105.3 overs); Andrew Jones 56 (113); Craig McDermott 4/39 (23 overs)		6/607dec (183 overs); Steve Waugh 147* (281); Simon Doull 2/105 (33 overs)
278 (103 overs); Ken Rutherford 86 (144); Shane Warne 4/59 (35 overs)

Australia won by an innings and 96 runs
Brisbane Cricket Ground, Woolloongabba, Brisbane
Umpires: Peter Parker and Steve Randell
Player of the match: Shane Warne (Australia)

- New Zealand won the toss and elected to bat.
- Bryan Young (NZ) made his Test debut.

Leading into the third test which was played at the Brisbane Cricket Ground, Chris Cairns stress fracture was cleared with New Zealand coach, Geoff Howarth and captain Rutherford wanting Cairns to play as a batsman but refused that offer. He replaced Chris Harris in the side, while Bryan Young (who replaced Murphy Su'a) was picked to make his test debut despite having four ducks in the tour matches before the test. For Australia, they only made the one change with Glenn McGrath coming in for Paul Reiffel.

Batting first on a pitch manufactured of batsman, New Zealand collapsed from a good position (3/167) to losing 6/26 in eighty minutes to be 9/193 as they finished the opening day on 9/208. The main culprits of the collapse being Shane Warne and Craig McDermott who each got three and four wickets respectively in the innings. For New Zealand, Andrew Jones top scored with 56 which included a partnership of 94 with debutant Young scoring 38. After bowling out New Zealand for 233 early on the second day, Australia would round up with 3/241 with the partnership between David Boon and Mark Waugh hitting another century partnership. Their sixth for the 1993 calendar year. The following day, centuries from Steve Waugh (147*) and Allan Border (105) who was playing in his 150th test built a partnership of 159. This partnership aid in getting Australia to declare on 6/607 early on the fourth day. Only Simon Doull took multiple wickets in the innings with 2/105 from 33 overs.

Chasing 374 to force Australia to bat again, New Zealand could only score 278 in their second innings with the match being played into a fifth day after showers affected the fourth day before the day was abandoned by the umpires. Ken Rutherford top scored for New Zealand with 56 while Shane Warne took four wickets as he not only claimed the man of the match but also man of the series with his 18 wickets across the three tests.

== Statistics ==
After the three tests, Andrew Jones ended up with the most runs of the series with 324 runs from six innings. He was followed by the Australian trio of Slater, Taylor and Boon with Kiwi batsman, Ken Rutherford rounding out the top five. Shane Warne finished the series as the leading wicket taker with 18 wickets from three matches at an average of 16.94 runs per wicket. He was followed by his Australian teammates in McDermott, May, McGrath and Mark Waugh. The leading wicket taker for New Zealand was Chris Cairns who took five wickets.

=== Most runs ===
Player	Team	Matches	Innings	Not Out	Runs	HS	Average	100s	50s
Andrew Jones	New Zealand	3	6	0	324	143	54.00	1	1
Michael Slater	Australia	3	4	0	305	168	76.25	1	1
Mark Taylor	Australia	3	4	1	286	142*	95.33	1	2
David Boon	Australia	3	4	1	262	106	87.33	1	2
Ken Rutherford	New Zealand	3	6	0	250	86	41.66	0	2

=== Most wickets ===
Player	Team	Matches	Overs	Runs	Wickets	Average	BBI
Shane Warne	Australia	3	151.3	305	18	16.94	6/31
Craig McDermott	Australia	3	133	340	12	28.33	4/39
Tim May	Australia	2	93.3	202	9	22.44	5/65
Glenn McGrath	Australia	2	96	253	6	42.16	3/66
Mark Waugh	Australia	3	48	94	5	18.80	1/7

== External sources ==
Cricinfo
