= South African cricket team in Australia in 1993–94 =

International cricket tour

	Australia	South Africa
- Dates: 26 December 1993 – 1 February 1994
Captains	Allan Border	Kepler Wessels (1st and 2nd test); Hansie Cronje (3rd test)

Test series
- Result: 3-match series drawn 1–1
Most runs	Mark Taylor (304)	Gary Kirsten (174)
Most wickets	Shane Warne (18)	Allan Donald (13)

The South Africa national cricket team toured Australia in the 1993–94 season to play three test matches against Australia in Melbourne, Sydney and Adelaide. These were played from 26 December 1993 to 1 February 1994. The tour was the first made by the South Africa cricket team to Australia in 30 years and was undertaken as the apartheid system was being dismantled in South Africa and the country transitioned to democratic government. Kepler Wessels captained the South Africans in the first two tests. After a hand injury, Hansie Cronje replaced him for the third test. Allan Border was Australia's captain for the series.

Before the test series, the South Africans played four matches in the tri-nation ODI tournament with Australia and New Zealand. After playing a warm-up match against a Queensland eleven, they played in the yearly Boxing Day test at the Melbourne Cricket Ground, which ended in a draw. The second test played at the Sydney Cricket Ground saw South Africa claim a five run victory before Australia came back in the third test at Adelaide Oval winning by 191 runs to tie the test series at 1–1.

Mark Taylor finished as the series' leading run scorer with 304 runs, with teammate Shane Warne taking the most wickets with 18.

== Background ==
The South Africa national cricket team toured Australia in the 1993–94 season to play three test matches against Australia in Melbourne, Sydney and Adelaide from 26 December 1993 to 1 February 1994. This was the first tour made by the South Africa cricket team to Australia in 30 years and was undertaken as South Africa's apartheid system was being dismantled and the country transitioned to democratic government. Kepler Wessels captained the South Africans in the first two tests. After a hand injury, Hansie Cronje replaced him for the third test. Allan Border was Australia's captain for the series.

The Australians and South Africans had different set-ups before the historic tour. The Australians had competed in a three-test series with New Zealand winning the series 2–0 after taking test wins at Hobart and Brisbane. Shane Warne was the leading wicket-taker for the series with 18 wickets. On the flip side, the South Africans competed in the 1993 Hero Cup in India with the same squad they were sending to the tour of Australia. After finishing the round-robin stage in second place, they were eliminated by the host nation. One of the talking points that Rick Allen of The Sydney Morning Herald mentioned was Brett Schultz, who had taken twenty wickets in the Sri Lankan tour but a knee injury had forced him out of the series. In the preview to the test series, the media saw as a battle between the pace of South Africa and the spin duo of Warne and Tim May.

=== Squads ===
Tests
Australia	South Africa
Allan Border (c); David Boon; Ian Healy (wk); Craig McDermott; Steve Waugh; Mark Waugh; Mark Taylor; Shane Warne; Tim May; Glenn McGrath; Paul Reiffel; Michael Slater; Damien Martyn	Kepler Wessels (c); Hansie Cronje (vc); Andrew Hudson; Daryll Cullinan; Jonty Rhodes; Dave Callaghan; Brian McMillan; Dave Richardson; Dave Rundle; Craig Matthews; Errol Stewart; Allan Donald; Richard Snell; Fanie de Villiers; Pat Symcox

== Tour matches ==
=== South Africa vs. The Prime Minister's XI ===
The opening match of the tour for South Africa was against the Prime Minister's XI in Manuka Oval. The Prime Minister's XI took home the victory by four runs over the South Africans, who still had some fitness worries leading into the match. Hansie Cronje was the top scorer for South Africa with 60 runs. Despite a late flurry of runs, South Africa did not match the required run rate early on and late tail-end wickets by Australia secured the victory.

2 December 1993
Scorecard

Prime Minister's XI (Australia); 8/156 (42 overs)	v	South Africa; 152 (42 overs)
Matthew Hayden 42 (78); Pat Symcox 3/24 (5 overs)		Hansie Cronje 60 (81); Tom Moody 2/18 (9 overs)

Prime Minister's XI won by 4 runs
Manuka Oval, Canberra
Umpires: Greg Davidson and Daryl Harper
Player of the match: Hansie Cronje (South Africa)

- Prime Minister's XI won the toss and elected to field first.

=== South Africa vs. Victoria ===
The South Africans' next tour match was a four-day game against Victoria at the Melbourne Cricket Ground. Batting first, the South Africans were bowled out for 261 on the opening day with Brian McMillan the top scorer with 55, while Victoria bowler, Damien Fleming took six wickets. The following day, Victoria could not take command. The youngster Brad Hodge was top scorer with 80 as Victoria lost four wickets for a single run before declaring on 8/330 only half an hour before lunch on the third day. Also on the third day, an angry McMillian described the pitch as a "beach" after injuring his knee, which forced him out for the first two tests. Rubber mats had to put in place on the run-up areas. Bowling South Africa for 178, Victoria chased down the target of 110 with six wickets to spare. Darrin Ramshaw was top scorer for Victoria with 42.

4–7 December 1993

South Africa	v	Victoria
261 (90 overs); Brian McMillan 55; Damien Fleming 6/86 (28 overs)		8/330dec (114 overs); Brad Hodge 80; Brian McMillan 3/26 (12.1 overs)
178 (75.5 overs); Jonty Rhodes 59; Craig Howard 5/42 (24.5 overs)		4/110 (33.1 overs); Darrin Ramshaw 41; Allan Donald 2/22 (11 overs)

Victoria won by 6 wickets
Melbourne Cricket Ground, Melbourne
Umpires: Darrell Holt, Len King, Bill Sheahan

=== South Africa vs. Queensland ===
After playing four matches in the tri-nation series, South Africa went to Queensland to play in the final warm-up match before the first test. Batting first, South Africa scored 7/335 in their first innings. This included a 242 run partnership between Hansie Cronje and Darryl Cullinan after they were 3/38 when the partnership arrived; they broke the Australian record for the fourth-wicket partnership. In response, only Stuart Law and Ian Healy settled in with 56 and 41 respectively, with the Queenslanders being bowled out for 183 on the second day. Fanie de Villiers was the pick of the bowlers with 3/34 with all of his wickets being in the top order. Not forcing the follow on, South Africa scored 8/224 in the second innings with Andrew Hudson scoring 105 in what was his first respectable score of the tour from six innings. The match would end in a draw, though, but not before Trevor Barsby almost scored a century as he fell one run short after falling leg before wicket to de Villiers.

20–23 December 1993
Scorecard

South Africa	v	Queensland
7/335dec (106 overs); Hansie Cronje 145; Michael Kasprowicz 5/92 (26 overs)		183 (68.5 overs); Stuart Law 56; Fanie de Villiers 3/34 (15 overs)
8/224dec (88 overs); Andrew Hudson 105; Michael Kasprowicz 2/42 (10 overs)		5/268 (95.1 overs); Trevor Barsby 99; Fanie de Villiers 2/53 (22.1 overs)

Match drawn
The Gabba, Brisbane
Umpires: Colin Timmins, Michael Jay and Peter Parker

- South Africa won the toss and elected to bat.

=== South Africa vs. New South Wales Invitational XI ===
Initially, this match was not on the tour schedule, but after the 1994 eastern seaboard fires tore through New South Wales, a match was arranged between the South Africans and an invitational eleven that featured Allan Border. For South Africa this was a practice match before the tri-nation series final against Australia and after Daryll Cullinan scored 95 in South Africa's 5/247. Chasing down the target, after a 59 from Mark Waugh, the invitational team collapsed as they lost six wickets for 25 runs to give South Africa the win by 19 runs. In Richard Snell's second spell he took four wickets to extinguish the hosts team's chances of winning.

18 January 1994
Scorecard

South Africa; 5/247 (50 overs)	v	New South Wales Invitational XI; 228 (49 overs)
Daryll Cullinan 95* (101); Mark Waugh 2/41 (9 overs)		Mark Waugh 59 (77); Richard Snell 4/22 (9 overs)

South Africa won by 19 runs
Sydney Cricket Ground, Sydney
Umpires: Darrell Hair and Ian Thomas

- South Africa won the toss and elected to bat.

== Test series summary ==
=== 1st Test ===
26–30 December 1993
Scorecard

Australia	v	South Africa
7/342dec (115.5 overs); Mark Taylor 170 (349); Craig Matthews 3/68 (24 overs)		3/258 (115 overs); Hansie Cronje 71 (168); Mark Waugh 1/20 (12 overs)

Match drawn
Melbourne Cricket Ground, Melbourne
Umpires: Darrell Hair and Terry Prue
Player of the match: Mark Taylor (Australia)

- Australia won the toss and elected to bat.
- There was no play on the second day.
- Fanie de Villiers and Gary Kirsten (both SA) made their Test debuts.

As the first test between these two sides in Australia since the 1963–64 tour, the opening test of the series was a momentous occasion. (Note: There was a tour planned in 1971–72, but it was cancelled because of the anti-apartheid movement.) Leading up to the test, Jonty Rhodes was declared fit and ready to go after being unable to face fast bowling for twelve days because of an injury to his hand sustained during the One Day International (ODI) played in Sydney. The opening two days of the test saw barely any action on the field with rain being a constant feature. After winning the toss, Australia got to 2/71 from the overs played during the first day with only Michael Slater and nightwatchman Shane Warne being the wickets to fall. In the case of Warne's wicket, it was Fanie de Villiers first wicket in test cricket as he and Gary Kirsten debuted for the South Africans.

The second day saw no play for the first time in Melbourne since the 1970–71 match against England when that whole test was abandoned. Estimates of revenue from the first two days was around $600,000 because of the loss of ten of the twelve hours of scheduled play. The following day saw another 128 minutes being played for only 69 runs before rain affected the rest of the day. The Australian Cricket Board had discussions about the test being turned into an ODI (One Day International). After the final two days, the match ended in a draw. During the match, Mark Taylor scored his 12th century becoming the second player after Martin Crowe to score centuries against seven different test nations. He would go on to score 170 as he and Mark Waugh (84) led Australia to declare on 7/342. For South Africa, Craig Matthews was the pick of the bowlers with 3/68. After ending the day on 1/59, South Africa finished the test on 3/258 with Cronje scoring 71 and Kepler Wessels, who had to be on pain-killing tablets the previous day, ended on 63 not out as the match finished in a draw.

=== 2nd Test ===
2–6 January 1994
Scorecard

South Africa	v	Australia
169 (74.1 overs); Gary Kirsten 67 (186); Shane Warne 7/56 (27 overs)		292 (141.2 overs); Michael Slater 92 (262); Fanie de Villiers 4/80 (36 overs)
239 (109 overs); Jonty Rhodes 76* (162); Shane Warne 5/72 (42 overs)		111 (56.3 overs); Craig McDermott 29* (38); Fanie de Villiers 6/43 (23.3 overs)

South Africa won by 5 runs
Sydney Cricket Ground, Sydney
Umpires: Steve Randell and Bill Sheahan
Player of the match: Fanie de Villiers (South Africa)

- South Africa won the toss and elected to bat.

The series' second test match saw changes only to the Australian side as they went with the same twelve players but with McGrath replacing Reiffel in the lineup. South Africa went with the same eleven from the first test. This was despite Brian McMillian testing his knee in the nets hoping for a call up to the team as he was picked as the 12th man. Wessels got through training and kept his spot on the team. On the opening day, South Africa won the toss and elected to bat. Initially, the decision was a good one, with the South Africans being 1/91 with Kirsten (67) and Cronje (41) setting a 90-run partnership. But with the crowd of 32,681 urging him on, Warne took 7/22 in a 78-ball spell as South Africa collapsed to be all out for 169. After surviving the first day on 1/20, Australia slow-marched their way towards South Africa's score with Slater (92) being in a 104-run partnership with captain Allan Border (49) that took four hours. During this time, Slater got hit on his right hand three times from the small plates of grass on the Randwick End with Border also getting hit in the eye as he attempted to sweep over Symcox' bowling. In an interview that day, Slater said, "The wicket is deteriorating quite quickly, and quite powdery." The Age described the pitch as more disintegrated than a fourth-day Shield strip. South Africa wasn't without trouble with Wessels having to be on the field for a short while due to a dive from second slip as it split the webbing inside the hand.

Australia batted for close to three hours on the third day before being bowled out for 292. This was helped by Damien Martyn, who delivered with his square cuts and pull shots for his 59. South Africa, though, had six chances going down during the innings which added to the four from the previous test. In bowling, de Villiers was the pick of the bowlers as he took 4/80 from 36 overs while Allan Donald also took four wickets. South Africa's she second innings saw some resistance with Kirsten and Cronje keeping Shane Warne away from wicket-taking opportunities. After Kirsten was bowled by Craig McDermott, Wessels (18) was brought up the order to bat at four. Despite the injury to his hand, which would later rule him out of the rest of the series, he defended his wicket for 41 minutes, getting South Africa to 2/94 by day's end. After an early collapse of 3/9 on the fourth day, Jonty Rhodes (76*) steadied the ship as he lasted three and a quarter hours, wearing down Warne and counter-attacking McDermott. His innings featured seven boundaries, which included a six over the square leg fence. Small contributions from Dave Richardson (24) and Allan Donald (10) got the score to 239, which set Australia a target of 117. Warne again being the pick of bowlers with 5/72 as his bowling performance of 12/128 had the best second performance by a bowler at the SCG (Sydney Cricket Ground).

Chasing 117 for victory, Australia got off to 1/51 before de Villiers took three wickets from five balls as he got David Boon (24), Tim May (0) and Taylor (27) to put Australia at 4/63 at the end of the day. Only Mark Waugh avoided giving de Villiers his hat-trick when he clipped the ball to mid-wicket for a three. The first over of the final day saw Border's wicket fall for seven off Donald to put Australia at 5/63. After the wickets from Warne, Healy and Waugh fell, Australia was now 8/75 with two wickets left. McDermott played his natural game on his 29*, while at the other end Damien Martyn (6) held firm at his crease. For 106 minutes he kept his wicket alive, bringing the target to only seven runs needed before driving a catch in the covers. The last wicket fell only eight balls later to give South Africa the win by five runs and their first test win at the SCG.

=== 3rd Test ===
28 January–1 February 1994
Scorecard

Australia	v	South Africa
7/469dec (164 overs); Steve Waugh 164 (276); Brian McMillan 3/89 (30 overs)		273 (132.2 overs); Andrew Hudson 90 (233); Steve Waugh 4/26 (18 overs)
6/124dec (40 overs); Mark Taylor 38 (75); David Boon 38 (67); Allan Donald 2/26 (11 overs)		129 (105.5 overs); Peter Kirsten 42 (229); Shane Warne 4/31 (30.5 overs)

Australia won by 191 runs
Adelaide Oval, Adelaide
Umpires: Darrell Hair and Terry Prue
Player of the match: Steve Waugh (Australia)

- Australia won the toss and elected to bat.

Heading into the test, the teams played in tri-series finals, which Australia won 2–1. On the day of the third final, the Australian touring squad confirmed their spot in the Austral-Asia Cup that was to be played after the South African tour. After winning the toss and electing to bat, Australian players Taylor, Slater and Boon all recorded half-centuries before getting out trying to raise the tempo of their innings. At the end of the day, Australia ended at 4/240 with Donald being the only multi-wicket taker with two wickets. After ending the first day on 32, Steve Waugh played with impressive confidence on his way to 164 runs as he and Allan Border broke the Australian record for the fifth wicket partnership against South Africa with 208. During that partnership though, Border became the first cricket player to get to 11,000 tests runs on his way to 84 as he got Australia to declare at 7/469. In response, South Africa only just avoided the follow on as they scored 273 for their first innings. Andrew Hudson was the South African's top scorer with 90 as he got them to 2/173 with Gary Kirsten (43) and Peter Kirsten (79) contributing. This was undone, though, by an inspirational spell from Steve Waugh who took four wickets in his spell. This was due to not taking the new ball at the end of the 80th over with Border keeping Waugh on.

Not forcing the follow on, the Australians struggled in the second innings with only Taylor (38) and Boon (38) resisting the South Africans as they limped to 6/124 before Border declared with 25 minutes after the third session of Day 4. The final hour of the fourth day saw Warne pick up two wickets for only two runs as the South Africans chasing 320 to win the series ended the day on 3/18 as Cronje and Kirsten both fell for single figures. Fanie de Villiers (30) and Kirsten (42) held the Australians out with a three-hour partnership for 82 runs as their opponents made 12 changes of seven different bowlers before de Villiers fell from a catch from Paul Reiffel at mid-off. That wicket would see a collapse as the South Africans lost their remaining seven wickets for only 29 runs to be bowled out for 129 and give Australia the win by 191 runs. During this collapse, Warne who got his 100th test wicket, while Healy claimed his 200th victim in test cricket with a splendid diving catch of McDermott.

== Statistics ==
After the three tests were played, Australian batsman, Mark Taylor ended the series with the most runs with 304 runs from five innings which included his 170 in the drawn test match at Melbourne. He finished ahead of fellow team-mate, Michael Slater (185 runs) and South African batsman Gary Kirsten (175 runs) who rounded out the top three. In the bowling area, Australian spinner, Shane Warne ended up as the leading wicket taker of the series with 18 wickets which included a 7/56 from the first innings in the Sydney test match. He finished ahead of fellow team-mate, Craig McDermott with South African pace bowler, Allan Donald rounding out the top three.

=== Most runs ===
Player	Team	Matches	Innings	Not Out	Runs	HS	Average	100s	50s
Mark Taylor	Australia	3	5	0	304	170	60.80	1	1
Michael Slater	Australia	3	5	0	185	92	37.00	0	2
Gary Kirsten	South Africa	3	5	0	174	67	34.80	0	1
Steve Waugh	Australia	1	2	0	165	164	82.50	1	0
Andrew Hudson	South Africa	3	5	1	157	90	39.25	0	2

=== Most wickets ===
Player	Team	Matches	Overs	Runs	Wickets	Average	BBI
Shane Warne	Australia	3	175.1	307	18	17.06	7/56
Craig McDermott	Australia	3	115.1	246	14	17.57	4/33
Allan Donald	South Africa	3	127.2	373	13	28.69	4/83
Fanie de Villiers	South Africa	3	132.3	311	11	28.27	6/43
Steve Waugh	Australia	1	24	30	4	7.50	4/26

== External sources ==
- Cricinfo
