= List of international cricket five-wicket hauls by Shane Warne =

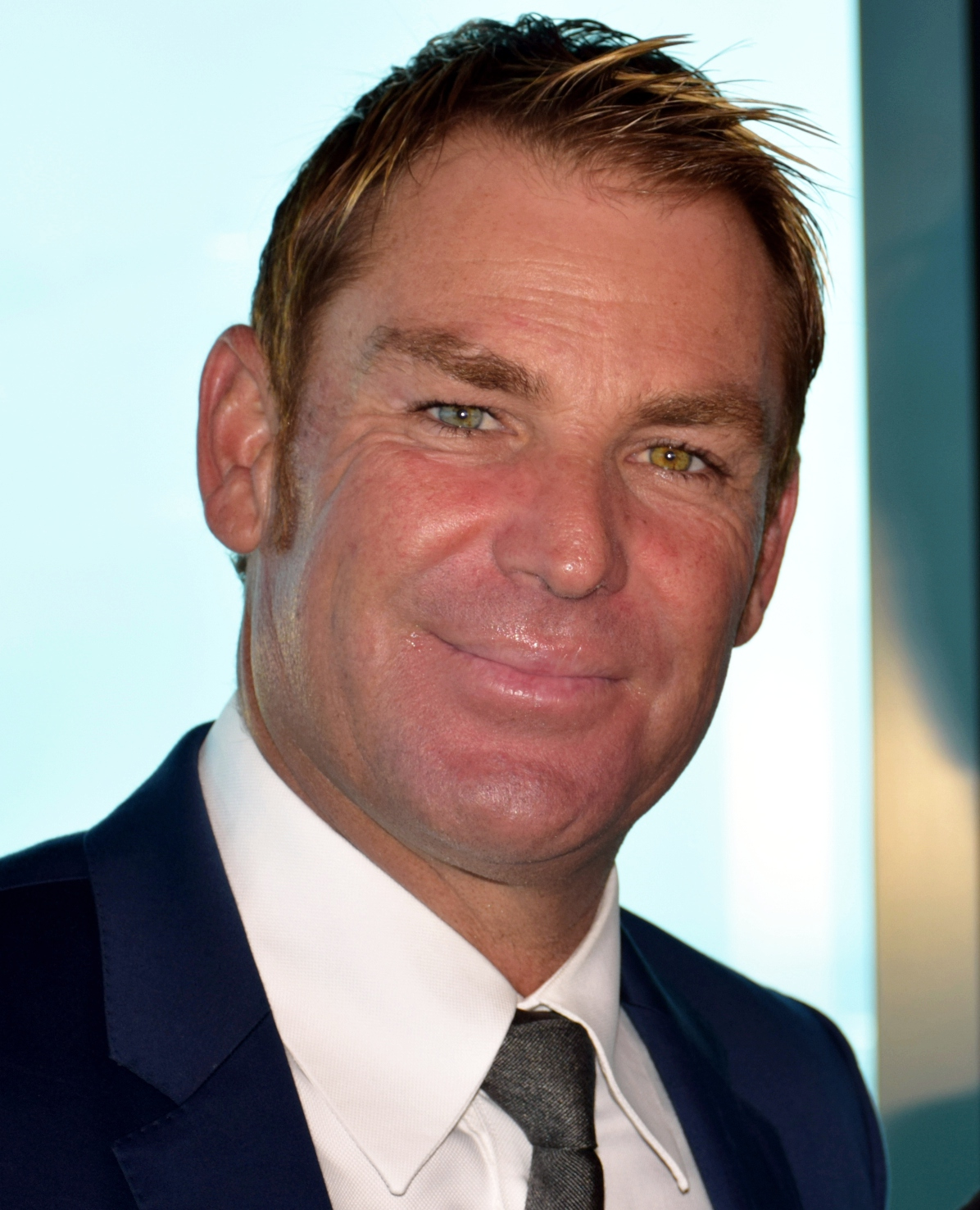
Shane Warne has captured the second highest number of five-wicket hauls in Test cricket.

Shane Warne, a late Australian international cricketer, had taken 37 five-wicket hauls during his career playing for the Australia national cricket team. In cricket, a five-wicket haul – also known as a five-for or fifer – refers to a bowler taking five or more wickets in a single innings. This is regarded as a notable achievement, and only eleven bowlers have taken more than 30 five-wicket hauls in their Test cricket careers. Warne has the second most five-wicket hauls in Test cricket, behind Sri Lanka's Muttiah Muralitharan. Despite this, he has only taken a single five-wicket haul in One Day Internationals (ODI). He was one of the most experienced Australian cricketers, and the second leading wicket taker in Test cricket history, with 708 wickets, again behind Muralitharan. He is twelfth on the all-time list of ODI wicket takers. In 2000, Warne was named the fourth of five Wisden Cricketers of the Century, behind Don Bradman, Garfield Sobers and Jack Hobbs.

Warne made his Test debut against the Indian team at the Sydney Cricket Ground (SCG) in January 1992, and took his first five-wicket haul later that year, against the West Indies team at the Melbourne Cricket Ground. He has taken ten or more wickets in a match 10 times in his career, and is second in the all-time list behind Muralitharan, with 22. Warne's career-best bowling figures in an innings is 8 wickets for 71 runs, which he accomplished in 1994 against the English team at the Brisbane Cricket Ground, while his best match figures are 12 wickets for 128 runs, achieved in 1994 against the South Africa team in Sydney. Warne has been most successful against England, taking 11 five-wicket hauls against them, the first in 1993 and the last in 2006, and was most prolific at the SCG, where 5 of his 38 five-wicket hauls were taken. Warne retired from international cricket in January 2007, having taken 708 Test and 293 ODI wickets in his career. He announced his retirement from all forms of cricket in May 2011.

== Key ==
Key
Symbol	Meaning
Date	Day the Test started or ODI held
Inn	Innings in which five-wicket haul was taken
Overs	Number of overs bowled in that innings
Runs	Number of runs conceded
Wkts	Number of wickets taken
Econ	Runs conceded per over
Batsmen	Batsmen whose wickets were taken
Result	Result for the Australia team
*	One of two five-wicket hauls by Warne in a match
†	10 or more wickets taken in the match
‡	Warne was selected as man of the match

== Tests ==
No.	Date	Ground	Against	Inn	Overs	Runs	Wkts	Econ	Batsmen	Result
1	26 December 1992 ‡	Melbourne Cricket Ground, Melbourne	West Indies	4	23.2	52	7	2.22	Phil Simmons; Richie Richardson; Keith Arthurton; Carl Hooper; David Williams; Ian Bishop; Courtney Walsh	Won
2	5 August 1993	Edgbaston, Birmingham	England	3	49	82	5	1.67	Mike Atherton; Graham Gooch; Robin Smith; Alec Stewart; Graham Thorpe	Won
3	26 November 1993	Bellerive Oval, Hobart	New Zealand	3	19.5	31	6	1.56	Blair Pocock; Ken Rutherford; Tony Blain; Murphy Su'a; Danny Morrison; Simon Doull	Won
4	2 January 1994 * †	Sydney Cricket Ground, Sydney	South Africa	1	27	56	7	2.07	Gary Kirsten; Daryll Cullinan; Jonty Rhodes; Kepler Wessels; Dave Richardson; Pat Symcox; Craig Matthews	Lost
5	2 January 1994 * †	Sydney Cricket Ground, Sydney	South Africa	3	42	72	5	1.71	Kepler Wessels; Daryll Cullinan; Craig Matthews; Fanie de Villiers; Allan Donald	Lost
6	28 September 1994 ‡	National Stadium, Karachi	Pakistan	4	36.1	89	5	2.46	Zahid Fazal; Akram Raza; Basit Ali; Wasim Akram; Waqar Younis	Lost
7	1 November 1994	Gaddafi Stadium, Lahore	Pakistan	1	41.5	136	6	3.25	Saeed Anwar; Ijaz Ahmed; Basit Ali; Akram Raza; Aaqib Javed; Mohsin Kamal	Drawn
8	25 November 1994 † ‡	Brisbane Cricket Ground, Brisbane	England	4	50.2	71	8	1.41	Mike Atherton; Alec Stewart; Graeme Hick; Graham Thorpe; Graham Gooch; Phil DeFreitas; Darren Gough; Martin McCague	Won
9	24 December 1994	Melbourne Cricket Ground, Melbourne	England	2	27.4	64	6	2.31	Mike Atherton; Alec Stewart; Graham Thorpe; Mike Gatting; Steve Rhodes; Phil DeFreitas	Won
10	9 November 1995 † ‡	Brisbane Cricket Ground, Brisbane	Pakistan	2	16.1	23	7	1.42	Aamer Sohail; Rameez Raja; Inzamam-ul-Haq; Basit Ali; Moin Khan; Wasim Akram; Mohammad Akram	Won
11	3 July 1997	Old Trafford, Manchester	England	2	30	48	6	1.60	Alec Stewart; Nasser Hussain; Graham Thorpe; John Crawley; Darren Gough; Andy Caddick	Won
12	27 November 1997	Bellerive Oval, Hobart	New Zealand	4	28	88	5	3.14	Chris Cairns; Stephen Fleming; Craig McMillan; Bryan Young; Adam Parore	Drawn
13	2 January 1998 * † ‡	Sydney Cricket Ground, Sydney	South Africa	1	32.1	75	5	2.33	Hansie Cronje; Shaun Pollock; Dave Richardson; Pat Symcox; Paul Adams	Won
14	2 January 1998 * † ‡	Sydney Cricket Ground, Sydney	South Africa	3	21	34	6	1.61	Jacques Kallis; Hansie Cronje; Herschelle Gibbs; Brian McMillan; Shaun Pollock; Dave Richardson	Won
15	9 September 1999	Asgiriya Stadium, Kandy	Sri Lanka	2	16	52	5	3.25	Aravinda de Silva; Mahela Jayawardene; Arjuna Ranatunga; Upul Chandana; Nuwan Zoysa	Lost
16	18 November 1999	Bellerive Oval, Hobart	Pakistan	3	45.5	110	5	2.40	Saeed Anwar; Saqlain Mushtaq; Inzamam-ul-Haq; Azhar Mahmood; Wasim Akram	Won
17	5 July 2001	Edgbaston, Birmingham	England	1	19	71	5	3.73	Mark Butcher; Usman Afzaal; Craig White; Ashley Giles; Darren Gough	Won
18	2 August 2001 ‡	Trent Bridge, Nottingham	England	3	18	33	6	1.83	Mike Atherton; Marcus Trescothick; Mark Ramprakash; Alec Stewart; Craig White; Alex Tudor	Won
19	23 August 2001 † ‡	The Oval, London	England	2	44.2	165	7	3.72	Mike Atherton; Marcus Trescothick; Mark Butcher; Alec Stewart; Andy Caddick; James Ormond; Darren Gough	Won
20	14 December 2001 ‡	Adelaide Oval, Adelaide	South Africa	2	39.4	113	5	2.84	Herschelle Gibbs; Lance Klusener; Mark Boucher; Shaun Pollock; Makhaya Ntini	Won
21	8 March 2002 ‡	Newlands, Cape Town	South Africa	3	70	161	6	2.30	Herschelle Gibbs; Graeme Smith; Jacques Kallis; Ashwell Prince; Makhaya Ntini	Won
22	3 October 2002 † ‡	Paikiasothy Saravanamuttu Stadium, Colombo	Pakistan	2	24.3	94	7	3.83	Abdul Razzaq; Misbah-ul-Haq; Faisal Iqbal; Rashid Latif; Saqlain Mushtaq; Waqar Younis; Shoaib Akhtar	Won
23	19 October 2002 ‡	Sharjah Cricket Association Stadium, UAE	Pakistan	2	30.1	74	5	2.45	Imran Farhat; Faisal Iqbal; Rashid Latif; Mohammed Sami; Danish Kaneria	Won
24	8 March 2004 * † ‡	Galle International Stadium, Galle	Sri Lanka	2	42.4	116	5	2.71	Sanath Jayasuriya; Hashan Tillakaratne; Upul Chandana; Kumar Dharmasena; Muttiah Muralitharan	Won
25	8 March 2004 * † ‡	Galle International Stadium, Galle	Sri Lanka	4	15	43	5	2.86	Marvan Atapattu; Mahela Jayawardene; Tillakaratne Dilshan; Hashan Tillakaratne; Kumar Dharmasena	Won
26	16 March 2004 * † ‡	Asgiriya Stadium, Kandy	Sri Lanka	2	20.1	65	5	3.22	Mahela Jayawardene; Hashan Tillakaratne; Tillakaratne Dilshan; Kaushal Lokuarachchi; Muttiah Muralitharan	Won
27	16 March 2004 * † ‡	Asgiriya Stadium, Kandy	Sri Lanka	4	21.1	90	5	4.25	Kumar Sangakkara; Tillakaratne Dilshan; Hashan Tillakaratne; Chaminda Vaas; Kaushal Lokuarachchi	Won
28	14 October 2004	M. A. Chidambaram Stadium, Chennai	India	2	42.3	125	6	2.94	Yuvraj Singh; Virender Sehwag; Irfan Pathan; Parthiv Patel; Anil Kumble; Harbhajan Singh	Drawn
29	10 March 2005	Jade Stadium, Christchurch	New Zealand	3	14	39	5	2.78	Hamish Marshall; Craig McMillan; Daniel Vettori; Iain O'Brien; Chris Martin	Drawn
30	4 August 2005 †	Edgbaston Cricket Ground, Birmingham	England	3	23.1	46	6	1.98	Andrew Strauss; Ian Bell; Kevin Pietersen; Andrew Flintoff; Ashley Giles; Steve Harmison	Lost
31	8 September 2005 * †	The Oval, London	England	1	37.3	122	6	3.25	Marcus Trescothick; Andrew Strauss; Michael Vaughan; Ian Bell; Kevin Pietersen; Ashley Giles	Drawn
32	8 September 2005 * †	The Oval, London	England	3	38.3	124	6	3.22	Marcus Trescothick; Andrew Strauss; Paul Collingwood; Andrew Flintoff; Ashley Giles; Steve Harmison	Drawn
33	3 November 2005	Brisbane Cricket Ground, Brisbane	West Indies	2	28	48	5	1.71	Shivnarine Chanderpaul; Daren Powell; Fidel Edwards; Corey Collymore; Jermaine Lawson	Won
34	25 November 2005	Adelaide Oval, Adelaide	West Indies	3	33	80	6	2.42	Wavell Hinds; Daren Powell; Brian Lara; Shivnarine Chanderpaul; Dwayne Smith; Denesh Ramdin	Won
35	24 March 2006 ‡	Sahara Stadium Kingsmead, Durban	South Africa	4	35.5	86	6	2.40	AB de Villiers; Graeme Smith; Jacques Kallis; Jacques Rudolph; André Nel; Makhaya Ntini	Won
36	16 April 2006	Chittagong Divisional Stadium, Chittagong	Bangladesh	3	36	113	5	3.13	Shahriar Nafees; Habibul Bashar; Rajin Saleh; Mohammad Ashraful; Mashrafe Mortaza	Won
37	26 December 2006 ‡	Melbourne Cricket Ground, Melbourne	England	1	17.2	39	5	2.25	Andrew Strauss; Kevin Pietersen; Chris Read; Steve Harmison; Monty Panesar	Won

== One Day Internationals ==
No.	Date	Ground	Against	Inn	Overs	Runs	Wkts	Econ	Batsmen	Result
1	8 December 1996 ‡	Sydney Cricket Ground, Sydney	West Indies	1	9.3	33	5	5.20	Roland Holder; Junior Murray; Nixon McLean; Kenny Benjamin; Courtney Walsh	Won
