= Pakistani cricket team in New Zealand in 1993–94 =

International cricket tour

The Pakistan national cricket team toured New Zealand in January to March 1994 and played a three-match Test series against the New Zealand national cricket team. Pakistan won the series 2–1. New Zealand were captained by Ken Rutherford and Pakistan by Saleem Malik. In addition, the teams played a five-match series of Limited Overs Internationals (LOI) which Pakistan won 3–1 with one match tied.

== Test series summary ==
=== 1st Test ===
10–12 February 1994
(5-day match)
Scorecard

New Zealand	v	Pakistan
242 (68.3 overs); AH Jones 66 (144); Waqar Younis 4/46 (15 overs)		215 (57.4 overs); Inzamam-ul-Haq 43 (92); SB Doull 5/66 (15 overs)
110 (32.1 overs); CL Cairns 31 (49); Wasim Akram 6/43 (16.1 overs)		141/5 (41 overs); Aamer Sohail 78 (124); RP de Groen 2/48 (13 overs); SB Doull 2/48 (16 overs)

Pakistan won by 5 wickets
Eden Park, Auckland
Umpires: HD Bird (ENG) and RS Dunne (NZ)
Player of the match: Wasim Akram (PAK)

- Pakistan won the toss and elected to field.
- The match was scheduled for five days but completed in three.

=== 2nd Test ===
17–20 February 1994
(5-day match)
Scorecard

New Zealand	v	Pakistan
175 (67 overs); MJ Greatbatch 45 (56); Wasim Akram 4/60 (24 overs)		548/5d (137.2 overs); Saeed Anwar 169 (248); DK Morrison 2/139 (31 overs)
361 (95.2 overs); TE Blain 78 (99); Wasim Akram 7/119 (37 overs)

Pakistan won by an innings and 12 runs
Basin Reserve, Wellington
Umpires: BL Aldridge (NZ) and HD Bird (ENG)
Player of the match: Wasim Akram (PAK)

- New Zealand won the toss and elected to bat.
- The match was scheduled for five days but completed in four.
- MN Hart (NZ) made his Test debut.

=== 3rd Test ===
24–28 February 1994
(5-day match)
Scorecard

Pakistan	v	New Zealand
344 (97 overs); Basit Ali 103 (139); DK Morrison 4/105 (24 overs)		200 (56 overs); AH Jones 81 (129); Waqar Younis 6/78 (19 overs)
179 (65.3 overs); Basit Ali 67 (111); DK Morrison 4/66 (21.3 overs)		324/5 (107 overs); SA Thomson 120* (167); Wasim Akram 3/105 (38 overs)

New Zealand won by 5 wickets
Lancaster Park, Christchurch
Umpires: RS Dunne (NZ) and KT Francis (SL)
Player of the match: SA Thomson and BA Young (both NZ)

- New Zealand won the toss and elected to field.
- Atif Rauf (PAK) made his Test debut.

== One Day Internationals (ODIs) ==
Pakistan won the Bank of New Zealand Trophy 3–1, with one match tied.

=== 1st ODI ===
3 March 1994
Scorecard

New Zealand; 122/9 (30 overs)	v	Pakistan; 123/5 (26.1 overs)
BA Young 20 (46); Saleem Malik 3/17 (4 overs)		Saeed Anwar 60* (72); C Pringle 2/20 (5 overs)

Pakistan won by 5 wickets
Carisbrook, Dunedin
Umpires: RS Dunne and CE King
Player of the match: Saeed Anwar (PAK)

- New Zealand won the toss and elected to bat.
- The match was reduced from 50 to 30 overs per side.

=== 2nd ODI ===
6 March 1994
Scorecard

Pakistan; 146 (43.3 overs)	v	New Zealand; 110 (44.3 overs)
Aamer Sohail 48 (92); SA Thomson 3/14 (3.3 overs)		KR Rutherford 37 (88); Wasim Akram 4/23 (7.3 overs)

Pakistan won by 36 runs
Eden Park, Auckland
Umpires: DB Cowie and DM Quested
Player of the match: Wasim Akram (PAK)

- New Zealand won the toss and elected to field.

=== 3rd ODI ===
9 March 1994
Scorecard

Pakistan; 213/6 (48 overs)	v	New Zealand; 202/8 (48 overs)
Inzamam-ul-Haq 88 (131); DK Morrison 3/32 (10 overs)		AH Jones 38 (67); SA Thomson 38 (40); Wasim Akram 2/41 (10 overs)

Pakistan won by 11 runs
Basin Reserve, Wellington
Umpires: BL Aldridge and DM Quested
Player of the match: Inzamam-ul-Haq (PAK)

- New Zealand won the toss and elected to field.
- The match was reduced from 50 to 48 overs per side.

=== 4th ODI ===
13 March 1994
Scorecard

Pakistan; 161/9 (50 overs)	v	New Zealand; 161 (49.4 overs)
Basit Ali 34 (60); GR Larsen 4/24 (10 overs)		KR Rutherford 47 (76); Waqar Younis 6/30 (9.4 overs)

Match tied
Eden Park, Auckland
Umpires: DB Cowie and RS Dunne
Player of the match: Waqar Younis (PAK)

- Pakistan won the toss and elected to bat.
- MN Hart (NZ) made his ODI debut.

=== 5th ODI ===
16 March 1994

Pakistan; 145/9 (50 overs)	v	New Zealand; 146/3 (34.1 overs)
Basit Ali 57 (85); DK Morrison 3/20 (10 overs)		BR Hartland 68* (109); Waqar Younis 2/33 (8.1 overs)

New Zealand won by 7 wickets
Lancaster Park, Christchurch
Umpires: BL Aldridge and CE King
Player of the match: BR Hartland (NZ)

- New Zealand won the toss and elected to field.
