= New Zealand cricket team in England in 1986 =

International cricket tour

The New Zealand cricket team toured England during the 1986 season to play a two-match One Day International series and a three-match Test series against England. New Zealand won the Test series, defeating England 1–0 with two matches drawn, the first time a New Zealand team had won a Test series in England.

As well as the international matches, the tourists played 11 first-class matches against English domestic teams and five other matches on the tour. These included two limited overs matches against the Dutch national team at The Hague towards the end of the tour.

== Tour party ==
The New Zealand team was captained by Jeremy Coney, with John Wright as the vice-captain. A tour party of 16 players was selected, including three who were uncapped in Test matches, fast-bowlers Brian Barrett and Willie Watson and backup wicket-keeper Tony Blain. (Note: Both Watson and Blain had made their international debuts for New Zealand in One Day International matches earlier in 1986.) Of the uncapped players, Watson and Blain made their Test match debuts during the tour, Blain playing in the final Test of the tour after first-choice wicket-keeper Ian Smith had become ill with a viral infection. Smith returned to New Zealand during the final Test of the tour and Blain played in each of the remaining matches. (Note: Barrett never played a full international match for New Zealand.)

Seven of the team played county cricket during the first part of the English season, including New Zealand's most capped player in the tour party, Richard Hadlee. The all-rounder had been offered a benefit season by his county team Nottinghamshire and an agreement was reached that he would only play for New Zealand in the three Test matches, appearing for Nottinghamshire for the rest of the period of the tour. According to Wisden, this arrangement was seen as beneficial by the New Zealand Cricket Council who saw the tour as an opportunity to develop younger fast bowlers.

- Jeremy Coney (captain)
- John Wright (vice-captain)
- Brian Barrett
- Tony Blain (wicket-keeper)
- John Bracewell
- Ewen Chatfield
- Jeff Crowe
- Martin Crowe
- Bruce Edgar
- Trevor Franklin
- Evan Gray
- Richard Hadlee (Test matches only)
- Ken Rutherford
- Ian Smith (wicket-keeper)
- Derek Stirling
- Willie Watson

== One Day International series ==
Before the Test series began, the two teams played a two-match One Day International series. New Zealand won the first match and England the second. The trophy was awarded to New Zealand based on a better run rate.

16 July 1986
Scorecard
Wisden report

New Zealand; 217/8 (55 overs)	v	England; 170 (48.2 overs)
JJ Crowe 66 (94); RM Ellison 3/43 (11 overs)		AJ Lamb 33 (45); JG Bracewell 2/27 (11 overs)

New Zealand won by 47 runs
Headingley, Leeds
Umpires: J Birkenshaw and BJ Meyer
Player of the match: JJ Crowe (New Zealand)

- New Zealand won the toss and chose to bat
- MR Benson (England) made his ODI debut

18 July 1986
Scorecard
Wisden report

New Zealand; 284/5 (55 overs)	v	England; 286/4 (53.4 overs)
MD Crowe 93* (74); JE Emburey 1/34 (11 overs)		CWJ Athey 142* (172); JV Coney 2/59 (11 overs)

England won by 6 wickets
Old Trafford, Manchester
Umpires: KE Palmer and NT Plews
Player of the match: CWJ Athey (England)

- England won the toss and chose to field

== Test series ==
The first and third matches of the three-match series were drawn. New Zealand won the second match by eight wickets.

=== First Test ===
24–29 July 1986
Scorecard
Wisden report

England	v	New Zealand
307 (118.5 overs); MD Moxon 74 (192); RJ Hadlee 6/80 (37.5 overs)		342 (140.1 overs); MD Crowe 106 (243); GR Dilley 4/82 (35.1 overs)
295/6d (120.4 overs); GA Gooch 183 (369); EJ Gray 3/83 (46 overs)		41/2 (15 overs); KR Rutherford 24* (43); GR Dilley 1/5 (6 overs)

Drawn
Lord's, London
Umpires: HD Bird and AGT Whitehead
Player of the match: GA Gooch (England)

- England won the toss and chose to bat
- MD Moxon (England) and W Watson (New Zealand) made their Test match debuts
  27 July was a rest day

=== Second Test ===
7–12 August 1986
Scorecard
Wisden report

England	v	New Zealand
256 (89.5 overs); DI Gower 71 (143); RJ Hadlee 6/80 (32 overs)		413 (169.5 overs); JG Bracewell 110 (200); GC Small 3/88 (38 overs)
230 (95.1 overs); JE Emburey 75 (136); RJ Hadlee 4/60 (33.1 overs)		77/2 (24 overs); MD Crowe 48* (52); GC Small 1/10 (8 overs)

New Zealand won by 8 wickets
Trent Bridge, Nottingham
Umpires: DJ Constant and KE Palmer
Player of the match: RJ Hadlee (New Zealand)

- New Zealand won the toss and chose to field
- GC Small (England) made his Test match debut
  10 August was a rest day

=== Third Test ===
21–26 August 1986
Scorecard
Wisden report

New Zealand	v	England
287 (128.2 overs); JG Wright 119 (343); GR Dilley 4/92 (28.2 overs)		388 (90.5 overs); DI Gower 131 (202); EJ Chatfield 3/73 (21 overs)
7/0 (1 over); JG Wright 7* (4)

Drawn
The Oval, London
Umpires: HD Bird and DR Shepherd
Player of the match: JG Wright (New Zealand)

- England won the toss and chose to field.
- TE Blain (New Zealand) made his Test match debut
  24 August was a rest day

== England's four wicket-keepers at Lord's ==
On day two of the first Test at Lord's, England's wicket-keeper Bruce French was hit on the head whilst batting by a delivery from Richard Hadlee. The injury, which occurred during the first innings of the match, forced him to go to hospital with concussion. As a consequence England required the use of a substitute wicket-keeper at the start of New Zealand's first innings. Batsman Bill Athey initially kept wicket but after only two overs former England wicket-keeper Bob Taylor, who had retired from first-class cricket but was working for the match sponsors as a host, replaced Athey, with the consent of the New Zealanders. (Note: The Laws of Cricket at the time permitted a specialist wicket-keeper to act as a substitute. The Laws have since been changed to permit only one of the players who started the match to keep wicket in Test matches.) Taylor kept wicket for the rest of day two before, on the following day, being replaced during the first session by Hampshire wicket-keeper Bobby Parks for the remainder of New Zealand's first innings. Following a rest day and the completion of England's innings, French was able to return on the final day of the match to keep wickets during New Zealand's second innings. None of the four keepers employed by England during the match took a catch or effected a stumping.
