= International cricket in 1993–94 =

International cricket season

The 1993–1994 international cricket season was from September 1993 to April 1994.

== Season overview ==
International tours
Start date	Home team	Away team	Results [Matches]			
Start date	Home team	Away team	Test	ODI	FC	LA
12 November 1993	Australia	New Zealand	2–0 [3]	—	—	—
26 November 1993	Australia	South Africa	1–1 [3]	—	—	—
1 December 1993	Sri Lanka	West Indies	0–0 [1]	1–1 [3]	—	—
1 December 1993	Pakistan	Zimbabwe	2–0 [3]	3–0 [3]	—	—
18 January 1994	India	Sri Lanka	3–0 [3]	2–1 [3]	—	—
10 February 1994	New Zealand	Pakistan	1–2 [3]	1–3 [5]	—	—
16 February 1994	West Indies	England	3–1 [5]	3–2 [5]	—	—
19 February 1994	South Africa	Australia	1–1 [3]	4–4 [8]	—	—
19 March 1994	New Zealand	India	0–0 [1]	2–2 [4]	—	—
International tournaments
Start date	Tournament				Winners	
28 October 1993	(United Arab Emirates) 1993–94 Pepsi Champions Trophy				West Indies	
9 November 1993	(India) 1993 Hero Cup				India	
9 December 1994	(Australia) 1993-94 Benson & Hedges World Series				Australia	
13 April 1994	(United Arab Emirates) 1993-94 Pepsi Austral-Asia Cup				Pakistan	

== October ==
=== 1993–94 Pepsi Champions Trophy ===
Team	P	W	L	T	NR	RR	Points
Pakistan	4	3	1	0	0	5.401	6
West Indies	4	3	1	0	0	4.782	6
Sri Lanka	4	0	4	0	0	4.139	0

Group stage
No.	Date	Team 1	Captain 1	Team 2	Captain 2	Venue	Result
ODI 839	28 October	Sri Lanka	Arjuna Ranatunga	West Indies	Richie Richardson	Sharjah Cricket Stadium, Sharjah	West Indies by 8 wickets
ODI 840	29 October	Pakistan	Wasim Akram	West Indies	Richie Richardson	Sharjah Cricket Stadium, Sharjah	West Indies by 39 runs
ODI 841	30 October	Pakistan	Wasim Akram	Sri Lanka	Arjuna Ranatunga	Sharjah Cricket Stadium, Sharjah	Pakistan by 114 runs
ODI 842	1 November	Pakistan	Wasim Akram	West Indies	Richie Richardson	Sharjah Cricket Stadium, Sharjah	Pakistan by 5 wickets
ODI 843	2 November	Pakistan	Wasim Akram	Sri Lanka	Arjuna Ranatunga	Sharjah Cricket Stadium, Sharjah	Pakistan by 2 wickets
ODI 844	3 November	Sri Lanka	Arjuna Ranatunga	West Indies	Desmond Haynes	Sharjah Cricket Stadium, Sharjah	West Indies by 8 wickets
Final
No.	Date	Team 1	Captain 1	Team 2	Captain 2	Venue	Result
ODI 845	5 November	Pakistan	Waqar Younis	West Indies	Richie Richardson	Sharjah Cricket Stadium, Sharjah	West Indies by 6 wickets

== November ==
=== 1993 Hero Cup ===
Team	P	W	L	T	NR	RR	Points
West Indies	4	3	1	0	0	6	+1.055
South Africa	4	2	1	0	1	5	+0.543
India	4	2	1	1	0	5	+0.082
Sri Lanka	4	1	3	0	0	2	−0.478
Zimbabwe	4	0	2	1	1	2	−1.260

Group stage
No.	Date	Team 1	Captain 1	Team 2	Captain 2	Venue	Result
ODI 846	7 November	India	Mohammad Azharuddin	Sri Lanka	Arjuna Ranatunga	Green Park Stadium, Kanpur	India by 7 wickets
ODI 847	9 November	Sri Lanka	Arjuna Ranatunga	West Indies	Desmond Haynes	Wankhede Stadium, Mumbai	West Indies by 46 runs
ODI 848	10 November	South Africa	Kepler Wessels	Zimbabwe	Andy Flower	M Chinnaswamy Stadium, Bangalore	No result
ODI 849	14 November	South Africa	Kepler Wessels	West Indies	Richie Richardson	Brabourne Stadium, Mumbai	South Africa by 41 runs
ODI 850	15 November	Sri Lanka	Arjuna Ranatunga	Zimbabwe	Andy Flower	Moin-ul-Haq Stadium, Patna	Sri Lanka by 55 runs
ODI 851	16 November	India	Mohammad Azharuddin	West Indies	Richie Richardson	Sardar Patel Stadium, Ahmedabad	West Indies by 69 runs
ODI 852	18 November	India	Mohammad Azharuddin	Zimbabwe	Andy Flower	Nehru Stadium, Indore	Match tied
ODI 853	19 November	South Africa	Kepler Wessels	Sri Lanka	Arjuna Ranatunga	Nehru Stadium, Guwahati	South Africa by 78 runs
ODI 854	21 November	West Indies	Richie Richardson	Zimbabwe	Andy Flower	Lal Bahadur Shastri Stadium, Hyderabad	West Indies by 134 runs
ODI 855	22 November	India	Mohammad Azharuddin	South Africa	Kepler Wessels	PCA IS Bindra Stadium, Mohali	India by 43 runs
Semi-Finals
No.	Date	Team 1	Captain 1	Team 2	Captain 2	Venue	Result
ODI 856	24 November	India	Mohammad Azharuddin	South Africa	Kepler Wessels	Eden Gardens, Kolkata	India by 2 runs
ODI 857	25 November	Sri Lanka	Arjuna Ranatunga	West Indies	Richie Richardson	Eden Gardens, Kolkata	West Indies by 7 wickets
Final
No.	Date	Team 1	Captain 1	Team 2	Captain 2	Venue	Result
ODI 858	27 November	India	Mohammad Azharuddin	West Indies	Richie Richardson	Eden Gardens, Kolkata	India by 102 runs

=== New Zealand in Australia ===
Trans-Tasman Trophy - Test series
No.	Date	Home captain	Away captain	Venue	Result
Test 1235	12–16 November	Allan Border	Martin Crowe	WACA Ground, Perth	Match drawn
Test 1236	26–29 November	Allan Border	Ken Rutherford	Bellerive Oval, Hobart	Australia by an innings and 222 runs
Test 1238	3–7 December	Allan Border	Ken Rutherford	The Gabba, Brisbane	Australia by an innings and 96 runs

== December ==
=== West Indies in Sri Lanka ===
ODI series
No.	Date	Home captain	Away captain	Venue	Result
ODI 859	1 December	Arjuna Ranatunga	Richie Richardson	P Sara Oval, Colombo	No result
ODI 864	16 December	Arjuna Ranatunga	Richie Richardson	R Premadasa Stadium, Colombo	Sri Lanka by 3 wickets
ODI 866	18 December	Arjuna Ranatunga	Richie Richardson	Sinhalese Sports Club Ground, Colombo	West Indies by 6 wickets
One-off Test
No.	Date	Home captain	Away captain	Venue	Result
Test 1239	8–13 December	Arjuna Ranatunga	Richie Richardson	Tyronne Fernando Stadium, Moratuwa	Match drawn

=== Zimbabwe in Pakistan ===
Test series
No.	Date	Home captain	Away captain	Venue	Result
Test 1237	1–6 December	Waqar Younis	Andy Flower	Southend Club Cricket Stadium, Karachi	Pakistan by 131 runs
Test 1240	9–14 December	Wasim Akram	Andy Flower	Rawalpindi Cricket Stadium, Rawalpindi	Pakistan by 52 runs
Test 1241	16–21 December	Wasim Akram	Andy Flower	Gaddafi Stadium, Lahore	Match drawn
ODI series
No.	Date	Home captain	Away captain	Venue	Result
ODI 867	24 December	Wasim Akram	Andy Flower	National Stadium, Karachi	Pakistan by 7 wickets
ODI 868	25 December	Wasim Akram	Andy Flower	Rawalpindi Cricket Stadium, Rawalpindi	Pakistan by 6 wickets
ODI 869	27 December	Wasim Akram	Andy Flower	Gaddafi Stadium, Lahore	Pakistan by 75 runs

=== 1993-94 Benson & Hedges World Series ===
Pos	Team	Pld	W	L	T	NR	Pts	NRR
1	Australia	8	5	3	0	0	10	0.363
2	South Africa	8	3	4	0	1	7	−0.066
3	New Zealand	8	3	4	0	1	7	−0.435

Source: Cricinfo

Group stage
No.	Date	Team 1	Captain 1	Team 2	Captain 2	Venue	Result
ODI 860	9 December	Australia	Allan Border	South Africa	Kepler Wessels	Melbourne Cricket Ground, Melbourne	South Africa by 7 wickets
ODI 860a	11 December	New Zealand	Ken Rutherford	South Africa	Kepler Wessels	Adelaide Oval, Adelaide	Match abandoned
ODI 861	12 December	Australia	Allan Border	New Zealand	Ken Rutherford	Adelaide Oval, Adelaide	Australia by 8 wickets
ODI 862	14 December	Australia	Allan Border	South Africa	Kepler Wessels	Sydney Cricket Ground, Sydney	Australia by 103 runs
ODI 863	16 December	Australia	Allan Border	New Zealand	Ken Rutherford	Melbourne Cricket Ground, Melbourne	Australia by 3 runs
ODI 865	18 December	New Zealand	Ken Rutherford	South Africa	Kepler Wessels	Bellerive Oval, Hobart	New Zealand by 4 wickets
ODI 870	8 January	New Zealand	Ken Rutherford	South Africa	Hansie Cronje	The Gabba, Brisbane	New Zealand by 9 runs
ODI 871	9 January	Australia	Allan Border	South Africa	Hansie Cronje	The Gabba, Brisbane	Australia by 48 runs
ODI 872	11 January	Australia	Allan Border	New Zealand	Ken Rutherford	Sydney Cricket Ground, Sydney	New Zealand by 13 runs
ODI 873	14 January	New Zealand	Ken Rutherford	South Africa	Hansie Cronje	WACA Ground, Perth	South Africa by 5 wickets
ODI 874	16 January	Australia	Allan Border	South Africa	Hansie Cronje	WACA Ground, Perth	South Africa by 82 runs
ODI 875	19 January	Australia	Allan Border	New Zealand	Ken Rutherford	Melbourne Cricket Ground, Melbourne	Australia by 51 runs
Finals
No.	Date	Team 1	Captain 1	Team 2	Captain 2	Venue	Result
ODI 876	21 January	Australia	Allan Border	South Africa	Hansie Cronje	Melbourne Cricket Ground, Melbourne	South Africa by 28 runs
ODI 877	23 January	Australia	Allan Border	South Africa	Hansie Cronje	Sydney Cricket Ground, Sydney	Australia by 69 runs
ODI 878	25 January	Australia	Allan Border	South Africa	Hansie Cronje	Sydney Cricket Ground, Sydney	Australia by 35 runs

=== South Africa in Australia ===
Test series
No.	Date	Home captain	Away captain	Venue	Result
Test 1242	26–30 December	Allan Border	Kepler Wessels	Melbourne Cricket Ground, Melbourne	Match drawn
Test 1243	2–6 January	Allan Border	Kepler Wessels	Sydney Cricket Ground, Sydney	South Africa by 5 runs
Test 1246	28 January-1 February	Allan Border	Hansie Cronje	Adelaide Oval, Adelaide	Australia by 191 runs

== January ==
=== Sri Lanka in India ===
Test series
No.	Date	Home captain	Away captain	Venue	Result
Test 1244	18–22 January	Mohammad Azharuddin	Arjuna Ranatunga	K. D. Singh Babu Stadium, Lucknow	India by an innings and 119 runs
Test 1245	26–30 January	Mohammad Azharuddin	Arjuna Ranatunga	M. Chinnaswamy Stadium, Bangalore	India by an innings and 95 runs
Test 1247	8–12 February	Mohammad Azharuddin	Arjuna Ranatunga	Sardar Patel Stadium, Ahmedabad	India by an innings and 17 runs
ODI series
No.	Date	Home captain	Away captain	Venue	Result
ODI 879	15 February	Mohammad Azharuddin	Arjuna Ranatunga	Madhavrao Scindia Cricket Ground, Rajkot	India by 8 runs
ODI 881	18 February	Mohammad Azharuddin	Arjuna Ranatunga	Lal Bahadur Shastri Stadium, Hyderabad	India by 7 wickets
ODI 883	20 February	Mohammad Azharuddin	Arjuna Ranatunga	Gandhi Stadium, Jalandhar	Sri Lanka by 4 wickets

== February ==
=== Pakistan in New Zealand ===
Test series
No.	Date	Home captain	Away captain	Venue	Result
Test 1248	10–12 February	Ken Rutherford	Saleem Malik	Eden Park, Auckland	Pakistan by 5 wickets
Test 1249	17–20 February	Ken Rutherford	Saleem Malik	Basin Reserve, Wellington	Pakistan by an innings and 12 runs
Test 1251	24–28 February	Ken Rutherford	Saleem Malik	AMI Stadium, Christchurch	New Zealand by 5 wickets
ODI series
No.	Date	Home captain	Away captain	Venue	Result
ODI 889	3 March	Ken Rutherford	Saleem Malik	Carisbrook, Dunedin	Pakistan by 5 wickets
ODI 891	6 March	Ken Rutherford	Saleem Malik	Eden Park, Auckland	Pakistan by 36 runs
ODI 893	9 March	Ken Rutherford	Saleem Malik	Basin Reserve, Wellington	Pakistan by 11 runs
ODI 894	13 March	Ken Rutherford	Saleem Malik	Eden Park, Auckland	Match tied
ODI 895	16 March	Ken Rutherford	Saleem Malik	AMI Stadium, Christchurch	New Zealand by 7 wickets

=== England in the West Indies ===
ODI series
No.	Date	Home captain	Away captain	Venue	Result
ODI 880	16 February	Richie Richardson	Mike Atherton	Kensington Oval, Bridgetown	England by 61 runs
ODI 887	26 February	Richie Richardson	Mike Atherton	Sabina Park, Kingston	West Indies by 3 wickets
ODI 888	2 March	Richie Richardson	Mike Atherton	Arnos Vale Ground, Kingstown	West Indies by 165 runs
ODI 890	5 March	Richie Richardson	Mike Atherton	Queen's Park Oval, Port of Spain	West Indies by 15 runs
ODI 892	6 March	Richie Richardson	Mike Atherton	Queen's Park Oval, Port of Spain	England by 5 wickets
Wisden Trophy - Test series
No.	Date	Home captain	Away captain	Venue	Result
Test 1250	19–24 February	Richie Richardson	Mike Atherton	Sabina Park, Kingston	West Indies by 8 wickets
Test 1254	17–22 March	Richie Richardson	Mike Atherton	Bourda, Georgetown	West Indies by an innings and 44 runs
Test 1257	25–30 March	Richie Richardson	Mike Atherton	Queen's Park Oval, Port of Spain	West Indies by 147 runs
Test 1258	8–13 April	Richie Richardson	Mike Atherton	Kensington Oval, Bridgetown	England by 208 runs
Test 1259	16–21 April	Courtney Walsh	Mike Atherton	Antigua Recreation Ground, St John's	Match drawn

=== Australia in South Africa ===
ODI series
No.	Date	Home captain	Away captain	Venue	Result
ODI 882	19 February	Kepler Wessels	Allan Border	The Wanderers Stadium, Johannesburg	South Africa by 5 runs
ODI 884	20 February	Kepler Wessels	Allan Border	SuperSport Park, Centurion	South Africa by 56 runs
ODI 885	22 February	Kepler Wessels	Allan Border	St George's Park, Port Elizabeth	Australia by 88 runs
ODI 886	24 February	Kepler Wessels	Allan Border	Kingsmead Cricket Ground, Durban	South Africa by 7 wickets
ODI 900	2 April	Kepler Wessels	Allan Border	Buffalo Park, East London	Australia by 7 wickets
ODI 901	4 April	Kepler Wessels	Allan Border	St George's Park, Port Elizabeth	South Africa by 26 runs
ODI 902	6 April	Kepler Wessels	Allan Border	Newlands Cricket Ground, Cape Town	Australia by 36 runs
ODI 903	8 April	Kepler Wessels	Allan Border	Mangaung Oval, Bloemfontein	Australia by 1 run
Test series
No.	Date	Home captain	Away captain	Venue	Result
Test 1252	4–8 March	Kepler Wessels	Allan Border	The Wanderers Stadium, Johannesburg	South Africa by 197 runs
Test 1253	17–21 March	Kepler Wessels	Allan Border	Newlands Cricket Ground, Cape Town	Australia by 9 wickets
Test 1256	25–29 March	Kepler Wessels	Allan Border	Kingsmead Cricket Ground, Durban	Match drawn

== March ==
=== India in New Zealand ===
One-off Test
No.	Date	Home captain	Away captain	Venue	Result
Test 1255	19–23 March	Ken Rutherford	Mohammad Azharuddin	Seddon Park, Hamilton	Match drawn
ODI series
No.	Date	Home captain	Away captain	Venue	Result
ODI 896	25 March	Ken Rutherford	Mohammad Azharuddin	McLean Park, Napier	New Zealand by 28 runs
ODI 897	27 March	Ken Rutherford	Mohammad Azharuddin	Eden Park, Auckland	India by 7 wickets
ODI 898	30 March	Ken Rutherford	Mohammad Azharuddin	Basin Reserve, Wellington	India by 12 runs
ODI 899	2 April	Ken Rutherford	Mohammad Azharuddin	AMI Stadium, Christchurch	New Zealand by 6 wickets

== April ==
=== 1993-94 Pepsi Austral-Asia Cup ===
Team	P	W	L	T	NR	RR	Points
Pakistan	2	2	0	0	0	5.453	4
India	2	1	1	0	0	5.098	2
United Arab Emirates	2	0	2	0	0	3.476	0

Team	P	W	L	T	NR	RR	Points
Australia	2	2	0	0	0	4.323	4
New Zealand	2	1	1	0	0	4.240	2
Sri Lanka	2	0	2	0	0	3.709	0

Group stage
No.	Date	Team 1	Captain 1	Team 2	Captain 2	Venue	Result
ODI 904	13 April	United Arab Emirates	Sultan Zarawani	India	Mohammad Azharuddin	Sharjah Cricket Stadium, Sharjah	India by 71 runs
ODI 905	14 April	Australia	Mark Taylor	Sri Lanka	Roshan Mahanama	Sharjah Cricket Stadium, Sharjah	Australia by 9 wickets
ODI 906	15 April	India	Mohammad Azharuddin	Pakistan	Saleem Malik	Sharjah Cricket Stadium, Sharjah	Pakistan by 6 wickets
ODI 907	16 April	Australia	Mark Taylor	New Zealand	Gavin Larsen	Sharjah Cricket Stadium, Sharjah	Australia by 7 wickets
ODI 908	17 April	United Arab Emirates	Sultan Zarawani	Pakistan	Saleem Malik	Sharjah Cricket Stadium, Sharjah	Pakistan by 9 wickets
ODI 909	18 April	Australia	Mark Taylor	Sri Lanka	Roshan Mahanama	Sharjah Cricket Stadium, Sharjah	New Zealand by 2 runs
Semi-Finals
No.	Date	Team 1	Captain 1	Team 2	Captain 2	Venue	Result
ODI 910	19 April	Australia	Mark Taylor	India	Mohammad Azharuddin	Sharjah Cricket Stadium, Sharjah	India by 7 wickets
ODI 911	20 April	New Zealand	Gavin Larsen	Pakistan	Saleem Malik	Sharjah Cricket Stadium, Sharjah	Pakistan by 62 runs
Final
No.	Date	Team 1	Captain 1	Team 2	Captain 2	Venue	Result
ODI 912	22 April	India	Mohammad Azharuddin	Pakistan	Saleem Malik	Sharjah Cricket Stadium, Sharjah	Pakistan by 39 runs
