= Sri Lankan cricket team in New Zealand in 1996–97 =

International cricket tour

The Sri Lankan national cricket team toured New Zealand February to March 1997 and played a two-match Test series against the New Zealand national cricket team. New Zealand won the series 2–0. New Zealand were captained by Stephen Fleming and Sri Lanka by Arjuna Ranatunga. In addition, the teams played a three-match series of Limited Overs Internationals (LOI) which was drawn 1–1.

== Test series summary ==
=== First Test ===
7–10 March 1997
(5-day match)
Scorecard

New Zealand	v	Sri Lanka
586/7d (146 overs); BA Young 267* (422); WPUJC Vaas 4/144 (35 overs)		222 (85.2 overs); HP Tillakaratne 55* (160); SB Doull 5/58 (21.2 overs)
		328 (f/o) (86.3 overs); RS Kaluwitharana 103 (103); SB Doull 3/82 (20.3 overs)

New Zealand won by an innings and 36 runs
Carisbrook, Dunedin
Umpires: CE King (NZ) and ID Robinson (ZIM)
Player of the match: BA Young (NZ)

- Sri Lanka won the toss and elected to field.
- The match was scheduled for five days but completed in four.
- DNT Zoysa (SL) made his Test debut.

=== Second Test ===
14–17 March 1997
(5-day match)
Scorecard

New Zealand	v	Sri Lanka
222 (90.4 overs); BA Pocock 85 (239); M Muralitharan 3/43 (22 overs)		170 (68.2 overs); RS Mahanama 45 (84); HT Davis 5/63 (20.2 overs)
273 (97.4 overs); BA Young 62 (127); DNT Zoysa 3/53 (22.4 overs)		205 (76.2 overs); RS Mahanama 65 (188); DL Vettori 5/84 (29.2 overs)

New Zealand won by 120 runs
Trust Bank Park, Hamilton
Umpires: DB Cowie (NZ) and Mahboob Shah (PAK)
Player of the match: DL Vettori (NZ)

- New Zealand won the toss and elected to bat.
- The match was scheduled for five days but completed in four.
- KSC de Silva (SL) made his Test debut.

== One Day Internationals (ODIs) ==
The series was drawn 1-1, with one match abandoned.

=== 1st ODI ===
22, 23 March 1997
Scorecard

New Zealand	v	Sri Lanka

Match abandoned
Eden Park, Auckland

- No toss made.
- Reserve day used.

=== 2nd ODI ===
25 March 1997 (D/N)
Scorecard

New Zealand; 201/9 (50 overs)	v	Sri Lanka; 202/4 (35.5 overs)
CZ Harris 38* (37); ST Jayasuriya 3/26 (10 overs)		ST Jayasuriya 79 (62); CZ Harris 2/38 (10 overs)

Sri Lanka won by 6 wickets
Lancaster Park, Christchurch
Umpires: CE King and DM Quested
Player of the match: ST Jayasuriya (SL)

- Sri Lanka won the toss and elected to field.
- MJ Horne and DL Vettori (both NZ) and DNT Zoysa (SL) made their ODI debuts.

=== 3rd ODI ===
27 March 1997
Scorecard

New Zealand; 201 (49.2 overs)	v	Sri Lanka; 132 (37.2 overs)
CL Cairns 56 (78); WPUJC Vaas 4/26 (9.2 overs)		PA de Silva 36 (74); HT Davis 4/35 (8.2 overs)

New Zealand won by 69 runs
Basin Reserve, Wellington
Umpires: RS Dunne and EA Watkin
Player of the match: CL Cairns (NZ)

- Sri Lanka won the toss and elected to field.
- AJ Penn (NZ) made his ODI debut.
