= Richard de Groen =

New Zealand cricketer

Personal information
- Full name: Richard Paul de Groen
- Born: 5 August 1962 (age 64); Ōtorohanga, New Zealand
- Batting: Right-handed
- Bowling: Right-arm fast-medium

International information
- National side: New Zealand (1993–1994)
- Test debut (cap 185): 6 November 1993 v Australia
- Last Test: 25 November 1994 v South Africa
- ODI debut (cap 86): 16 December 1993 v Australia
- Last ODI: 19 December 1994 v Pakistan

Domestic team information
- Years: Team
- 1987/88–1989/90: Auckland
- 1990/91–1995/96: Northern Districts

Career statistics
Competition	Test	ODI	FC	LA
Matches	5	12	60	50
Runs scored	45	12	311	69
Batting average	7.50	2.39	7.97	4.31
100s/50s	0/0	0/0	0/0	0/0
Top score	26	7*	35	12
Balls bowled	1,060	549	12,352	2,340
Wickets	11	8	210	56
Bowling average	45.90	59.75	25.07	29.00
5 wickets in innings	0	0	10	0
10 wickets in match	0	0	2	0
Best bowling	3/40	2/34	7/50	4/16
Catches/stumpings	0/–	2/–	10/–	10/–
- Source: Cricinfo, 4 May 2017

Richard Paul de Groen (born 5 August 1962) is a former New Zealand international cricketer. He played five Test matches and 12 One Day Internationals for New Zealand in 1993 and 1994. He is now a Commonwealth Games official.

== Life and career ==
De Groen was born at Ōtorohanga in Waikato and educated at Mount Albert Grammar School in Auckland. He studied accountancy at the University of Auckland and worked as a manager with Price Waterhouse from 1986 to 1997.

He played domestic cricket for Auckland and Northern Districts between the 1987–88 and 1995–96 seasons. In the match against Otago in the 1992–93 Shell Trophy he took 7 for 50 and 6 for 49. He was the leading bowler in the competition that season with 46 wickets at an average of 16.84; the next most successful was his Northern Districts teammate Matthew Hart with 34 at 17.23. Northern Districts won the competition. Wisden described de Groen as "a medium-fast right-armer of admirable control and stamina".

He toured Australia with the Test team in 1993–94, playing in two of the three Tests after being called up during the tour to replace the injured Willie Watson. He then played two Tests at home against Pakistan in 1993–94, and a final Test on the tour to South Africa in 1994–95. He took his best Test figures in the First Test against Pakistan: 3 for 40 and 2 for 48.

De Groen was Games Team Manager with the New Zealand Olympic Committee from 1998 to 2007, controlling all aspects of team preparations for three Commonwealth Games (1998, 2002 and 2006) and three Olympic Games (2000, 2002 and 2004). Since 2008 he has been the development director with the Commonwealth Games Federation.
