= Troy Cooley =

Australian cricketer & coach (born 1965)

Personal information
- Full name: Troy James Cooley
- Born: 9 December 1965 (age 60); Launceston, Tasmania, Australia
- Batting: Right-handed
- Bowling: Right-arm fast-medium
- Role: Bowler

Domestic team information
- Years: Team
- 1986–1995: Tasmania

Career statistics
Competition	First-class	List A
Matches	33	3
Runs scored	291	–
Batting average	9.38	–
100s/50s	0/0	–
Top score	32*	–
Balls bowled	4,871	120
Wickets	54	4
Bowling average	61.35	21.25
5 wickets in innings	0	0
10 wickets in match	0	0
Best bowling	4/41	2/16
Catches/stumpings	16/–	2/–
- Source: CricketArchive, 22 August 2010

Troy James Cooley (born 9 December 1965) is a former first-class cricketer who played for Tasmania, and was bowling coach for the England cricket team for several years before returning to Australia in 2006.

== Career ==
Born in Launceston, Tasmania, Cooley played 33 first-class games and three one-day games for the Australian state. With the bat he scored 291 runs in first-class cricket at an average of 9.38 with a top score of 32 not out. In one-day domestic cricket with the bat he never had to bat in his 3 matches that he played. With the ball in first-class cricket he took 54 wickets at 61.35 with a best of 4/41 and in one-day domestic cricket with the ball he took 4 wickets at an average of 21.25 with a best of 2/16.

== Coaching ==
Cooley took up coaching for the Tasmanian Tigers as at one time or another an assistant coach to the state team, the state's junior development officer, fitness advisor, pace bowling coach and under-17 coach.

As the bowling coach for the England national team, he was considered instrumental in helping players such as Andrew Flintoff, Steve Harmison, Simon Jones and Matthew Hoggard.

Following the lack of an offer from the ECB, he left his post at the end of his contract in December 2005, and in May 2006 became the bowling coach for the Australian national team. The England Cricket Board (ECB) was criticised for letting him move as he was seen as a key figure in England's 2005 Ashes success. Following England's loss of the first test in The Ashes in Australia in 2006, former England captain Tony Greig commented that England missed Cooley. After England had lost the fourth test, Cooley commented that the English side has lost its "intensity", and was surprised at the team bringing back injured players like Ashley Giles who had little recent form.

At the end of the 2010–11 Ashes series, Cooley became head coach of Cricket Australia's Centre of Excellence in Brisbane.

Cooley left Cricket Australia in 2021 and joined the BCCI where he was responsible for Ccoaching and setting up the National Pace Bowling Program.

In early 2026, he returned to the England coaching team as national pace-bowling lead, where he would be 'responsible for development and coaching of fast bowlers across the England men, Lions and Young Lions.'

== Family ==
Spouse – Melissa Cooley, Children – Grace Cooley and Edward Cooley
