= Bill Sheahan (umpire) =

Australian cricket umpire (born 1953)

Personal information
- Full name: William Peter Sheahan
- Born: 12 December 1953 (age 72)
- Role: Umpire

Umpiring information
- Tests umpired: 2 (1993–1994)
- ODIs umpired: 5 (1993–1994)
- WODIs umpired: 1 (1991)
- Source: Cricinfo, 12 July 2013

William Peter Sheahan (born 12 December 1953) is an Australian cricket umpire who umpired Test cricket in the 1990s.

Sheahan began umpiring Victorian grade cricket in the early 1980s when an injury ended his playing career.

He umpired two Test matches in the 1993/94 season. His first match was between Australia and New Zealand at Bellerive Oval, Hobart on 26 to 29 November 1993, won by Australia by an innings and 222 runs, with Michael Slater, David Boon and Mark Waugh scoring centuries, and Shane Warne and Tim May taking 9 and 7 wickets respectively. Sheahan's partner was Darrell Hair.

Sheahan's other Test match was between Australia and South Africa at Sydney on 2 to 6 January 1994, won by the visitors by 5 runs when Australia failed to reach a target of 117 runs. Shane Warne took 12 wickets in the match. Sheahan's partner was Steve Randell.

Sheahan umpired five One Day International (ODI) matches between 1993 and 1994. Altogether, he umpired 34 first-class matches in his career between 1989 and 1999.

== See also ==
- List of Test cricket umpires
- List of One Day International cricket umpires
