= Errol Stewart (South African sportsman) =

South African sportsman (born 1969)

Cricket information
- Batting: Right-handed
- Bowling: Right-arm medium
- Source: Cricinfo, 3 October 2002

Errol Leslie Rae Stewart (born 30 July 1969) is a former South African cricketer and rugby union player. He attended Westville Boys' High School in Westville, KwaZulu-Natal where he was selected for the SA schools cricket and rugby sides in 1987 (alongside future Proteas Jonty Rhodes, Hansie Cronje and Richard Snell and future Springboks James Small, Ruben Kruger and Brendan Venter). He also was selected for Natal schools for Hockey and athletics. He studied law at the University of Natal and played as a wicket-keeper for the University of Natal and for the Natal Dolphins, captaining them in his final season in 2004.

== Career ==
He played six One Day Internationals in cricket, making his debut in 1992 against Pakistan in East London, but no Tests for South Africa. He also played Currie Cup Rugby for the Sharks. While he only made 35 appearances in the black-and-white jersey on the rugby field, it must be remembered that rugby back then did not start in February and was still considered a winter sport. He played at centre and was alongside some of the stalwarts of Natal rugby. In 1995 he won the Currie cup with the Sharks rugby team and the Currie cup with the Natal Dolphins cricket side. He is one of only a handful of people to achieve this feat and with the onset of professional sport this achievement is unlikely to be emulated. He played club cricket with Shaun Pollock for the University of Natal and later with English Test cricketer Kevin Pietersen at Berea Rovers in Durban before Pietersen made his controversial move to the UK. Cricket stood tall for Stewart as he tucked his rugby jersey away for the final time at the end of the 1997 season, giving cricket his full attention. Stewart played 87 times for Natal, scoring 4321 runs with eight hundreds and 21 fifties at an average of 34,84. He played 98 first-class matches for 5150 runs at 36,78. His highest score was 207 for Natal B against Border at Kingsmead, a ground he rates as his favourite, alongside the Wanderers. Stewart retired from cricket in 2004 and is a lawyer by profession.

After his playing days, he was involved with the International Cricket Council in Dubai, spending three years there from 2007, as the body's head of sponsorship, having been approached by Dave Richardson to take on the job. He is currently the Head of International private clients at Standard Bank.

He would later be appointed as a South African National Selector.
