= Damion Reeves =

Australian cricketer (born 1971)

Personal information
- Full name: Damion Albert Reeves
- Born: 12 July 1971 (age 55); Darwin, Northern Territory, Australia
- Batting: Right-handed
- Bowling: Right-arm fast

Domestic team information
- Years: Team
- 1992/93–1993/94: South Australia

Career statistics
Competition	FC	LA
Matches	14	1
Runs scored	246	1
Batting average	15.37	1.00
100s/50s	0/0	0/0
Top score	40*	1
Balls bowled	2,174	38
Wickets	35	2
Bowling average	41.94	13.50
5 wickets in innings	0	0
10 wickets in match	0	0
Best bowling	4/57	2/27
Catches/stumpings	2/–	0/–
- Source: ESPNcricinfo, 21 September 2020

Damion Albert Reeves (born 12 July 1971) is a former Australian cricketer. Born in Darwin, Northern Territory, he represented South Australia in fourteen first-class matches during 1992–93 and 1993–94 seasons of the Sheffield Shield.

== See also ==
- List of South Australian representative cricketers
