= Bryan Young (cricketer) =

New Zealand cricketer (born 1964)

Personal information
- Full name: Bryan Andrew Young
- Born: 3 November 1964 (age 62); Whangārei, New Zealand
- Batting: Right-handed
- Role: Batsman/Wicket-keeper

International information
- National side: New Zealand (1990–1999)
- Test debut (cap 186): 3 December 1993 v Australia
- Last Test: 18 March 1999 v South Africa
- ODI debut (cap 75): 11 December 1990 v Australia
- Last ODI: 27 March 1999 v South Africa

Career statistics
Competition	Test	ODI	FC	LA
Matches	35	74	163	172
Runs scored	2,034	1,668	7,489	4,452
Batting average	31.78	24.52	32.14	28.72
100s/50s	2/12	0/9	10/37	2/27
Top score	267*	74	267*	108*
Balls bowled	–	–	48	–
Wickets	–	–	1	–
Bowling average	–	–	76.00	–
5 wickets in innings	–	–	0	–
10 wickets in match	–	–	0	–
Best bowling	–	–	1/76	–
Catches/stumpings	54/0	28/0	297/11	84/12
- Source: Cricinfo, 4 May 2017

Bryan Andrew Young (born 3 November 1964) is a former international cricketer who played 35 Test matches and 74 One Day Internationals (ODIs) for New Zealand between 1990 and 1999. He played internationally as a right-handed opening batsman who scored over 2,000 Test runs, including a highest score of 267 not out against Sri Lanka in 1997.

== Early life and domestic career ==
Young was born at Whangārei in the Northland Region of New Zealand in 1964. He began his cricket career as a wicket-keeper and lower-order batsman for Northern Districts. He made his first-class cricket debut for the side in January 1984 and played for the side until the end of the 1997/98 season when he moved to Auckland for his final season as a professional cricketer. He played more than 150 matches for Northern Districts.

== International cricket ==
Young made his international debut for New Zealand in an ODI against Australia at Melbourne in December 1990. During the early 1990s he became a "dogged" opening batsman and played his first Test match in December 1993 during New Zealand's tour of Australia. He went on to make 35 test and 74 ODI appearances for the national side, playing his final international matches in March 1999 against South Africa. Young acquired a reputation as a slow scoring opening batsman and his record as an opener has been described as "traditional, old-school". He scored 38 runs from 167 deliveries in his first Test innings before going on to make a half century in his second innings, making 53 from 122 balls and in December 1994 he scored the third slowest half-century in Test history, taking 333 minutes to reach 50 runs in the second Test on New Zealand's tour of South Africa.

His batting could also, however, lead to New Zealand victories. He made 120 runs to anchor a difficult run chase in the fourth innings of the Christchurch Test against the touring Pakistan side in 1994, adding 154 runs with Shane Thomson for the fifth wicket, and his score of 267 not out, the only double-century of his career, lead to an inning victory over Sri Lanka at Dunedin in March 1997. His score of 267 not out against the touring Sri Lankans in 1997 was the second highest Test match score made by a New Zealander at the time and the highest score by an opening batsman from the country. Young was also an effective slip fielder, on average taking almost a catch in every innings in which he fielded at Test level.
