= Dave Rundle =

South African cricketer (born 1965)

Personal information
- Full name: David Bryan Rundle
- Born: 25 September 1965 (age 61); Cape Town, South Africa
- Batting: Right-handed
- Bowling: Right-arm offbreak
- Role: Bowler

International information
- National side: South Africa
- ODI debut (cap 29): 9 January 1994 v Australia
- Last ODI: 25 January 1994 v Australia

Domestic team information
- Years: Team
- 1984/85–1996/97: Western Province B
- 1987/88–1996/97: Western Province

Career statistics
Competition	ODI	FC	LA
Matches	2	96	126
Runs scored	6	2,597	1,049
Batting average	3.00	23.39	20.56
100s/50s	0/0	2/7	0/2
Top score	6	110	75
Balls bowled	96	19,419	6,166
Wickets	5	250	114
Bowling average	19.00	32.10	32.40
5 wickets in innings	0	9	0
10 wickets in match	0	2	0
Best bowling	4/42	6/37	4/19
Catches/stumpings	3/–	76/–	58/–
- Source: Cricinfo, 25 April 2022

David Bryan Rundle (born 25 September 1965) is a former South African cricketer who played two One Day Internationals (ODIs) in 1994.

Born in Cape Town, Rundle attended St Stithians College and Stellenbosch University and was chosen in the Nuffield XI South African Schools XI in 1982/83. Rundle made his first-class debut, for Western Province B against Boland in 1984/85.

Rundle played both his ODIs against Australia during the 1993/94 Benson & Hedges World Series in Australia. In his debut ODI at The Gabba in Brisbane, Rundle had bowling figures of 9-0-42-4.
