= Michael Slater =

Australian cricketer

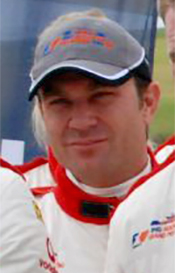
- Slater in 2008

Personal information
- Full name: Michael Jonathon Slater
- Born: 21 February 1970 (age 56); Wagga Wagga, New South Wales, Australia
- Nickname: Slats
- Height: 173 cm (5 ft 8 in)
- Batting: Right-handed
- Bowling: Right arm medium

International information
- National side: Australia
- Test debut (cap 357): 3 June 1993 v England
- Last Test: 20 August 2001 v England
- ODI debut (cap 114): 9 December 1993 v South Africa
- Last ODI: 24 May 1997 v England

Domestic team information
- Years: Team
- 1991/92–2003/04: New South Wales
- 1998–1999: Derbyshire

Career statistics
| Competition | Test | ODI | FC | LA |
|---|---|---|---|---|
| Matches | 74 | 42 | 216 | 135 |
| Runs scored | 5,312 | 987 | 14,912 | 3,395 |
| Batting average | 42.83 | 24.07 | 40.85 | 26.52 |
| 100s/50s | 14/21 | 0/9 | 36/69 | 2/27 |
| Top score | 219 | 73 | 221 | 115 |
| Balls bowled | 25 | 12 | 133 | 12 |
| Wickets | 1 | 0 | 3 | 0 |
| Bowling average | 10.00 | – | 37.66 | – |
| 5 wickets in innings | 0 | – | 0 | – |
| 10 wickets in match | 0 | – | 0 | – |
| Best bowling | 1/4 | – | 1/4 | – |
| Catches/stumpings | 33/– | 9/– | 116/– | 31/– |
Medal record
Men's Cricket
Representing Australia
ICC Cricket World Cup
| Runner-up | 1996 India-Pakistan-Sri Lanka |
- Source: Cricinfo, 7 December 2009

Michael Jonathon Slater (born 21 February 1970) is an Australian former professional cricketer and former television presenter. He played in 74 Test matches and 42 One Day Internationals for the Australia national cricket team. He was a part of the Australian squad which finished as runners-up at the 1996 Cricket World Cup.

== Early life ==
=== Family life and education ===
Slater was born in Wagga Wagga, New South Wales, and lived in both Wagga and Junee for his childhood. His parents, Peter and Carole and two older siblings had emigrated from the north-eastern coast of England in 1966 to Launceston, Tasmania, Australia where his father taught high school agriculture and science.

After three years, the family moved and his father became a teacher in agriculture at Wagga Wagga Agricultural College. Slater's mother left the family in 1983, when he was just 12 years old. He later wrote about tough personal times that followed, claiming that his education standards slipped after his mother left the family and that sport became the "only thing [he] could focus on properly". However, it was later revealed that Slater has manic depression (bipolar disorder). He has claimed that school bullying accentuated his academic difficulties in Years 9 and 10 and claimed that he once ran home after it was suggested that some bullies "were planning to get [him] after school".

=== Early cricket career ===
Slater wrote: "My family was always involved in sport, so from an early age it just seemed natural for me to play any game that was on offer." When aged 11, Slater was selected in the New South Wales Primary School Sports Association cricket and hockey teams. He also made the state under-12 hockey team in 1981 and went on to be selected in the Under-13, -15 and -17 hockey teams. Slater wrote that, in his early teenage years, he turned towards cricket.

Slater joined an inner-western Sydney Under-16 team over a Christmas holiday to further develop his cricketing career. After topping the batting averages in the Under-17s, in the following season, he was chosen as captain of the New South Wales Under—16 team. The carnival was not a success for him but his team performed "well". Slater claimed that he hurt his Achilles tendon in an accident at school when he was seventeen and played a couple of hockey games following the accident but limped off the field and subsequently had surgery in the lead-up to the Under-17 national cricket carnival. Slater claimed he was informed that, because of his injury, his "dream of playing cricket for Australia was over". However, after an operation, he returned to cricket and was selected in the Under-19 state team for the national championships in Brisbane. He attended the Australian Institute of Sport Australian Cricket Academy in 1989.

After an injury to the captain, Slater captained the state under-19 team but he and his team under-performed. The following year, he was vice-captain for the Under-19 carnival in Canberra and scored a century in the opening match. In a victorious final against Victoria, Slater scored another century, becoming one of the leading run-scorers in the series.

== Cricket career ==
A specialist right-handed batter as well as a very occasional right-arm medium-pace bowler, Slater represented the New South Wales Blues in Australian domestic cricket and played English county cricket with Derbyshire. His Australian club was the University of NSW Cricket Club, for whom he scored 3873 runs in 77 first-grade innings, with a high score of 213 not out. Slater went on to Test cricket, opening the batting with mixed success, scoring 5,312 runs and 14 centuries at an average of 42. He was generally unsuccessful in One-Day International games, averaging a lowly 24.07 and, after a string of failures, was eventually dropped from the national limited-overs team for good in 1997.

Throughout his career, Slater was susceptible to the "nervous nineties": of the 23 times he reached a score of 90 in a Test innings, he was dismissed nine times before reaching 100.

Slater played for New South Wales in the 1991/92 Sheffield Shield season. He made quick progress to the Australian team, being selected for the Ashes tour of England in 1993, when he was 23 years of age, narrowly beating Queenslander Matthew Hayden to the opening berth alongside vice/captain Mark Taylor, who also grew up in Wagga Wagga. In his debut match, he scored a half-century, before compiling his maiden century in the following Test match at Lord's, famously kissing the Australian coat of arms on his helmet to celebrate achieving the milestone. He continued his good form into the subsequent home series against New Zealand in 1993–94, netting 305 runs at an average of 76.25. In the 1994–95 return Ashes series in Australia, Slater was the leading run-scorer in the series with 623. The following season saw him notch his first double-century, against Sri Lanka at the WACA in Perth.

Slater's match-winning 123 against England at Sydney in the 1998–99 Ashes series comprised 66.84 per cent of his team's entire total. This remains the greatest proportion since Charles Bannerman made 165 not out (67.34 per cent) in the very first Test innings of all, in 1877.

Slater was dropped from the Australian Test team in late 1996 after some poor form. It took him two years to get back into the national team and things went well for a couple of years, although this period coincided with a split from his first wife and accusations of drug-taking by the Australian Cricket Board (ACB). His Ashes tour to England in 2001 was his last international series. He started off with a quick-fire 77 in his first innings of the series, including four boundaries off the first four balls he faced from Darren Gough. However, as the series went on, Slater’s form started to decline dramatically, ultimately leading to Justin Langer replacing him as opening batter. It was subsequently reported that Slater felt animosity towards Langer over this decision and became reclusive. It was later revealed that he suffered from bipolar disorder. Unable to rebuild a career in limited-overs cricket, his prolonged form slump forced him out of professional cricket after 74 Test matches.

== Legal issues ==
Since his retirement from cricket and the end of his media work, Slater has faced many legal issues, including multiple arrests and charges.

On 20 October 2021, Slater was arrested on charges of domestic violence, stalking and using a carrier service to harass, relating to his ex-wife.

On 15 December 2021, New South Wales Police arrested Slater for allegedly breaching an apprehended violence order (AVO). He was then released on police bail.

On 27 April 2022, Slater came under a fresh police investigation over an alleged domestic violence incident, just hours before he had similar charges dismissed on mental health grounds.

On 27 May 2022, Slater was arrested and charged with assault and stalking/intimidating after police were called to a unit in Manly on April 26, 2022

On 18 July 2022, Slater was escorted to Manly Police Station and charged with breach of bail. Magistrate Megan Greenwood granted Slater bail and again ordered him to abide by the strict conditions of the arrangement.

On 31 August 2022, Slater was charged with two new counts of common assault and one count of attempting to stalk or intimidate intending fear of physical or mental harm after he allegedly assaulted a man at Frenchs Forest on Sydney's northern beaches.

On 22 September 2022, Slater was arrested for allegedly breaching bail. New South Wales Police applied for an interim apprehended violence order to protect the woman he was with at the time of his arrest.

On 9 November 2022, Slater was convicted of domestic violence charges, using a carriage service to harass, stalking or intimidating and common assault at Manly Local Court. Slater also had two counts of common assault and one count of attempting to stalk or intimidate, relating to an incident at a northern beaches hospital in July, dismissed on mental health grounds. The magistrate described the convictions as "warranted" and "expected by the community", saying that repeated domestic violence offending cannot go unpunished. Slater was sentenced to a two-year jail sentence to be served in the community.

On 31 March 2023, Slater was arrested and charged with assaulting a police officer and two counts of obstructing police following a confrontation at Noosa Heads.

On 21 November 2023, Slater was sentenced over the police altercation in Noosa Heads. The judge fined Slater $600 but did not record a conviction.

On 14 April 2024, Slater was arrested and charged 19 times, the alleged charges including domestic violence offences of unlawful stalking or intimidation, breaking into a dwelling with intent at night, common assault, assault occasioning bodily harm, choking or suffocation, and breaching bail. He was subsequently denied bail to appear again in late May

On 10 December 2024, Slater was charged with 14 counts of contravening a domestic violence order, five counts of common assault (domestic violence), one of breaching bail, two of driving a vehicle with a drug in his system, one of driving while over the general alcohol limit and one of being in charge of a vehicle while over the general alcohol limit. The allegations stem from incidents in April, Slater who is currently on remand will face court on 26th of Feb 2025

On 22 April 2025, Slater was sentenced to four years and released with the jail term partly suspended in lieu of the time of 375 days already served while waiting for the trial to be completed, he was released with the condition that any serious offences over the next 5 years will be grounds for him to serve the full sentence.

On 1 December 2025, Slater's lifetime membership of Cricket NSW was revoked and he was removed from the organisation's hall of fame due to his prior domestic violence charges.

== Media work ==
=== Television ===
After commentating for Channel 4 in the United Kingdom during the 2005 Ashes series, Slater joined Nine's Wide World of Sports cricket commentary team in January 2006. He later appeared as a reporter on Channel Nine's health and lifestyle programme, What's Good For You? He also appeared as a contestant on the Australian version of Torvill and Dean's Dancing on Ice in 2006, becoming the fourth contestant to be eliminated.

In 2009 to 2010, he was the sports presenter for the Nine Network's Weekend Today alongside co-hosts Cameron Williams and Leila McKinnon. In 2009, he also hosted Australia's Greatest Athlete (alongside Andrew Voss), which aired on Saturday afternoons in January and February. He was co-host of The Footy Show a rugby league-based television variety programme, alongside Paul Vautin, Darryl Brohman, Erin Molan and Beau Ryan and host of The Cricket Show, both on Channel 9. In 2012, Slater called the diving at the 2012 Summer Olympics in London, England for Channel 9 and Fox Sports alongside dual Australian Olympic diver Michael Murphy.

In 2018, he joined the Seven Network to commentate its coverage of the Test Cricket and Big Bash League. In 2021, during the COVID-19 pandemic, Slater travelled to India to commentate on Indian Premier League cricket during a continued uncontrolled outbreak of the virus in India. He attracted a backlash for his criticisms of the Australian COVID-19 travel restrictions and claims that the Australian Prime Minister Scott Morrison, had "blood on his hands" over the handling of the pandemic. Slater was subsequently axed by the Seven Network, which chose to not renew his contract, citing "budget restraints".

=== Radio ===
Slater was a regular contributor to the Triple M Sydney radio sports panel program Dead Set Legends and was a replacement co-host for Richard Freedman on Sky Sports Radio's Big Sports Breakfast with Terry Kennedy until 2017
