= Richard Snell (cricketer) =

South African cricketer (born 1968)

Cricket information
- Batting: Right-handed
- Bowling: Right-arm fast-medium

Career statistics
Competition	Test	ODI
Matches	5	42
Runs scored	95	322
Batting average	13.57	16.10
100s/50s	0/0	0/2
Top score	48	63
Balls bowled	1,025	2,095
Wickets	19	44
Bowling average	28.31	35.77
5 wickets in innings	0	1
10 wickets in match	0	0
Best bowling	4/74	5/40
Catches/stumpings	1/–	7/–
- Source: Cricinfo, 25 January 2006

Richard Peter Snell (born 12 September 1968) is a former South African cricketer who played in five Test matches and 42 One Day Internationals for South Africa.

He played for Transvaal in the early 1990s forming a formidable opening pair with Steven Jack.

== International career ==
He took South Africa's first Test wicket after they were re-admitted to international cricket. His 5/40 against Australia at MCG in the Benson & Hedges World Series in 1993–1994 being the best. His four wickets for 12 runs against Sri Lanka during the Hero Cup in 1993 was highly impressive. His highest score in ODIs was 63 which came as an opener against England at Chevrolet Park, Bloemfontein in 1996.

== After cricket ==
Since retiring from first class cricket in 1998, Richard Snell, worked as a trained physiotherapist before joining his family's industrial cleaning service and supply business, Reno Industrial Africa.
