= Andrew Jones (New Zealand cricketer) =

New Zealand cricketer

Personal information
- Full name: Andrew Howard Jones
- Born: 9 May 1959 (age 67); Wellington, New Zealand
- Batting: Right-handed
- Bowling: Right-arm offbreak
- Role: Batsman

International information
- National side: New Zealand (1987–1995)
- Test debut (cap 163): 16 April 1987 v Sri Lanka
- Last Test: 10 February 1995 v West Indies
- ODI debut (cap 170): 10 October 1987 v Zimbabwe
- Last ODI: 28 January 1995 v West Indies

Domestic team information
- Years: Team
- 1979/80–1982/83: Central Districts
- 1983/84–1984/85: Otago
- 1985/86–1993/94: Wellington
- 1994/95: Central Districts

Career statistics
Competition	Test	ODI	FC	LA
Matches	39	87	145	164
Runs scored	2,922	2,784	9,180	4,983
Batting average	44.27	35.69	41.53	33.89
100s/50s	7/11	0/25	16/52	0/38
Top score	186	93	186	95
Balls bowled	328	306	2,791	980
Wickets	1	4	34	19
Bowling average	194.00	54.00	42.32	39.21
5 wickets in innings	0	0	0	0
10 wickets in match	0	0	0	0
Best bowling	1/40	2/42	4/28	3/22
Catches/stumpings	25/–	23/–	91/–	47/–
- Source: Cricinfo, 4 May 2017

Andrew Howard Jones (born 9 May 1959) is a former New Zealand cricketer. Between 1987 and 1995 he played in 39 Test matches and 87 One Day Internationals for New Zealand. Domestically he played for Central Districts, Otago, and Wellington.

== Schoolboy career ==
Andrew Jones attended Nelson College from 1972 to 1976, and was a member of the school's 1st XI cricket team for four years. He was awarded the Wood Cup for best all-round athlete at the college in 1975.

== International career ==
Jones did not make his international debut until the age of 27, playing his first Test match in April 1987 against Sri Lanka. He became a solid number 3 batsman, where he played all but four of his Test innings. New Zealand only won six of the 39 Tests in which he played. Jones's batting style was characterised by an unusual but effective jumping method against short deliveries.

He was a batsman who was difficult to dismiss when set, he scored over 140 in five of his seven hundreds. He had a strong record against subcontinental teams, against India he scored 401 runs at 50.13 and made 625 runs at 62.50 against the Sri Lankans. It was against the Sri Lankans that he made his highest Test score of 186 in Wellington. With Martin Crowe, Jones made a partnership of 467 which became a Test record as the highest partnership by any team for any wicket. The innings came in a prolific period for Jones as he made 122 and an unbeaten 100 in his next two Test innings. Jones is currently the only New Zealand batsman to have ever scored 3 hundreds in consecutive innings.

Despite maintaining an average of 35.69 in 87 ODI innings, he never scored a century in that format of the game. His highest score of 93 came in Sharjah against Bangladesh. Jones was New Zealand's second highest runscorer at the 1992 Cricket World Cup.
