= Tim May =

Australian cricketer (born 1962)

Personal information
- Full name: Timothy Brian Alexander May
- Born: 26 January 1962 (age 64); North Adelaide, South Australia, Australia
- Height: 173 cm (5 ft 8 in)
- Batting: Right-handed
- Bowling: Right-arm offbreak
- Role: Bowler

International information
- National side: Australia (1986–1995)
- Test debut (cap 342): 11 December 1987 v New Zealand
- Last Test: 1 January 1995 v England
- ODI debut (cap 99): 13 October 1987 v Zimbabwe
- Last ODI: 18 March 1995 v West Indies

Domestic team information
- Years: Team
- 1984/85–1995/96: South Australia

Career statistics
Competition	Test	ODI
Matches	24	47
Runs scored	225	39
Batting average	14.06	9.75
100s/50s	0/0	0/0
Top score	42*	15
Balls bowled	6,577	2,504
Wickets	75	39
Bowling average	34.74	45.43
5 wickets in innings	3	0
10 wickets in match	0	0
Best bowling	5/9	3/19
Catches/stumpings	6/–	3/–
Medal record
Men's Cricket
Representing Australia
ICC Cricket World Cup
Winner	1987 India and Pakistan
- Source: CricInfo, 12 December 2005

Timothy Brian Alexander May (born 26 January 1962) is a former Australian cricketer for South Australia. He was, until June 2013, a leading players' representative in his role as Chief Executive of the Federation of International Cricketers' Associations (FICA). May played in 24 Tests and 47 ODIs in an injury-interrupted career between 1987 and 1995. May was a part of the Australian team that won their first world title during the 1987 Cricket World Cup and the South Australian team that won the 1995-96 Sheffield Shield Competition.

== Early life ==
May attended Prince Alfred College. He played AFL and cricket as a child and made his district 'A' Grade debut for Adelaide University, then Kensington.

He studied economics at university and became a chartered accountant.

== Domestic career ==
May made his first class debut in 1984–85. He struggled at first, and had time out for injury, but took five wickets against Queensland in one of the last games that summer.

In 1986-87 he took 43 first class wickets at 33.

In 1988-89 he took 50 first class wickets at 32.02.

May came back from injury in December 1990 to take 6–115 against Queensland, his best performance for three seasons.

May's final first class season was in 1995-96 where he took 44 wickets at 35. His lasts first class game was the 1995-96 Sheffield Shield final at the Adelaide Oval. He took 2-157 and 1–57 with the ball but survived for 52 balls (while scoring 0) in the second innings to help South Australia draw the game and win the Shield.

== International career ==
May was selected in the Australian squad to play the 1987 World Cup in India and Pakistan, picked over Greg Matthews and Peter Sleep. (Peter Taylor was the other spinner in the squad.) May played six ODIs during the World Cup, his best performances including 2–29 against Zimbabwe. He played in both the semi final and the final although he had relatively little impact in both games.

May's test debut was in the second test against New Zealand in 1987–88. He took 1–134 in the first innings but was more successful in the second, taking 3-68. He was not picked for any other tests that summer but was selected on the 1988 tour of Pakistan.

In Pakistan, May played all three tests. He took 14 wickets at 28.07, Australia's equal best wicket taker alongside Bruce Reid.

May played the next two tests, against the West Indies. He was dropped but recalled for the fifth test and was selected on the 1989 Ashes, although he did not play any test matches.

May was then out of the Australian side as the selectors preferred Trevor Hohns, Peter Taylor, Greg Matthews and Shane Warne as a spinner. May's career was also hampered by injury - in October 1989 he was sent home from India (where he was playing for Australia in the Nehru Cup) to have knee surgery.

May was recalled to the Australian side for the fourth test against the West Indies at Adelaide Oval in 1992–93. May had his best Test match bowling figures of 5/9. In the final innings of the same match he had his best batting score of 42 not out, as Australia lost to the West Indies by 1 run. He injured his finger while batting and missed the 5th test.

May was selected on the 1993 tours of New Zealand and England. He was overlooked for all the New Zealand test matches and the first test in the Ashes, but selected for the second, and went on to form an effective spinning combination with Shane Warne. May took 21 tickets at 28.19 for the series, Australia's third highest wicket taker (after Warne and Merv Hughes).

Australia kept the Warne-May combination though the 1993-94 summer and on the 1994 tours of South Africa and Pakistan.

May played three tests over the 1994-95 Ashes before being dropped. May was picked on the 1995 tour of the West Indies but played no test matches.

== After cricket ==
In 1997, May became the inaugural CEO of the Australian Cricketers' Association and was a significant influence in its establishment as an important organisation in Australian cricket. He was a significant figure in the threatened 1998 players' strike which led to the first ever collective bargaining agreement with the Australian Cricket Board.

May was the driving force behind the staging of the World Cricket Tsunami Appeal match in 2004.

In June 2005, he was appointed as the CEO of FICA, based in Austin, Texas. On 5 June 2013 May announced his resignation as CEO of FICA.

== Personal life ==
In 2024 May did an interview where he revealed he had been diagnosed with prostate cancer. He also confessed to being a recovering alcoholic but was "four years sober".
