= Willie Watson (New Zealand cricketer) =

New Zealand cricketer (born 1965)

Personal information
- Full name: William Watson
- Born: 31 August 1965 (age 61); Auckland, New Zealand
- Batting: Right-handed
- Bowling: Right-arm fast-medium

International information
- National side: New Zealand (1986–1994)
- Test debut (cap 159): 24 July 1986 v England
- Last Test: 12 November 1993 v Australia
- ODI debut (cap 54): 5 April 1986 v Sri Lanka
- Last ODI: 19 January 1994 v Australia

Domestic team information
- Years: Team
- 1984/85–1994/95: Auckland

Career statistics
Competition	Test	ODI	FC	LA
Matches	15	61	93	125
Runs scored	60	86	472	173
Batting average	5.00	7.81	8.90	9.10
100s/50s	0/0	0/0	0/0	0/0
Top score	11	21	38*	21
Balls bowled	3,486	3,251	17,968	6,403
Wickets	40	74	272	159
Bowling average	34.67	30.36	27.51	26.05
5 wickets in innings	1	0	8	1
10 wickets in match	0	0	0	0
Best bowling	6/78	4/27	7/60	7/23
Catches/stumpings	4/–	9/–	23/–	15/–
- Source: Cricinfo, 4 February 2017

William Watson (born 31 August 1965) is a former New Zealand cricketer.

Watson, a right-arm fast-medium bowler, played 15 Tests and 61 One Day Internationals for New Zealand between 1986 and 1994. He took his best Test bowling figures of 6 for 78 against Pakistan in Lahore in October 1990.

Watson played first-class cricket for Auckland from 1984–85 to 1994–95. He took his best first-class figures of 7 for 60 in Auckland's innings victory over Central Districts in 1989–90.

Since retiring from cricket, Watson has worked for Lion, Cadbury, DB Breweries and Bic.
