= Blair Pocock =

New Zealand cricketer (born 1971)

Personal information
- Full name: Blair Andrew Pocock
- Born: 18 June 1971; Auckland, New Zealand
- Batting: Right-handed
- Bowling: Right-arm slow

International information
- National side: New Zealand (1993–1997)
- Test debut (cap 184): 12 November 1993 v Australia
- Last Test: 20 November 1997 v Australia

Career statistics
Competition	Test	FC	LA
Matches	15	100	59
Runs scored	665	4,699	1,354
Batting average	22.93	29.36	25.54
100s/50s	0/6	10/22	1/6
Top score	85	167	117
Balls bowled	24	700	136
Wickets	0	4	5
Bowling average	–	78.25	27.20
5 wickets in innings	–	0	0
10 wickets in match	–	0	0
Best bowling	–	1/7	3/23
Catches/stumpings	5/–	52/–	22/–
- Source: Cricinfo, 1 May 2017

Blair Andrew Pocock (born 18 June 1971) is a New Zealand cricket player who played 15 Test matches for his national side. He was born in Papakura, New Zealand.

Pocock was one of the many openers used in the poorly performing New Zealand national cricket team of the mid-1990s, but made little impact in Test cricket, averaging under 23. The major teams that he was in were New Zealand, Auckland and Northern Districts. He is the nephew of Michael Graeme Pocock, who also played first-class cricket.

== General references ==
- Blair Pocock at Cricinfo
