= Ken Rutherford (cricketer) =

New Zealand cricketer (born 1965)

Ken Rutherford MNZM
Personal information
- Full name: Kenneth Robert Rutherford
- Born: 26 October 1965 (age 61); Dunedin, New Zealand
- Batting: Right-handed
- Bowling: Right-arm medium
- Role: Batsman
- Relatives: Hamish Rutherford (son); Ian Rutherford (brother)

International information
- National side: New Zealand (1985–1995)
- Test debut (cap 155): 29 March 1985 v West Indies
- Last Test: 22 March 1995 v Sri Lanka
- ODI debut (cap 50): 27 March 1985 v West Indies
- Last ODI: 1 April 1995 v Sri Lanka

Domestic team information
- Years: Team
- 1982/83–1994/95: Otago
- 1995/96–1999/00: Transvaal/Gauteng

Career statistics
Competition	Test	ODI	FC	LA
Matches	56	121	220	248
Runs scored	2,465	3,143	13,974	6,888
Batting average	27.08	29.65	39.92	31.59
100s/50s	3/18	2/18	35/67	6/44
Top score	107*	108	317	130*
Balls bowled	256	389	1,729	862
Wickets	1	10	22	21
Bowling average	161.00	32.30	46.00	33.47
5 wickets in innings	0	0	1	0
10 wickets in match	0	0	0	0
Best bowling	1/38	2/39	5/72	3/26
Catches/stumpings	32/–	41/–	180/–	91/–
- Source: Cricinfo, 4 April 2017

Kenneth Robert Rutherford MNZM (born 26 October 1965) is a former New Zealand cricketer who enjoyed a ten-year career with the national team, and was captain for a period in the 1990s. He is the 50th ODI cap for New Zealand.

== Family ==
Rutherford's elder brother Ian Rutherford also played first-class cricket as a batsman for Otago from 1974–75 to 1983–84. The brothers played in the same Otago team in 1982–83 and 1983–84.

Rutherford's eldest son Hamish Rutherford made his Test debut for New Zealand against England in March 2013, scoring 171.

== Domestic career ==
Ken Rutherford played for Kings High School first XI in Dunedin. He made the team in his third form on the Monday before he officially started at school. He would open the batting with Glen Denham. He made his debut for Otago in 1982–83 at the age of 17, batting at number six. He then was granted a scholarship at Lords in 1984. Following this, Rutherford was selected for the Young New Zealand tour of Zimbabwe.

Opening the batting for Otago in 1984–85 he scored 442 runs at 44.20, including his first century, 130 against Auckland, and he was asked to open the batting for New Zealand in the West Indies at a time when West Indies were at the height of their powers. Rutherford's highest score for Otago was 226 not out against India in the 1989/90 season.

Rutherford's highest first-class score of 317, scored playing for a New Zealand touring team against a D.B.Close XI at Scarborough in 1986, achieved several records for New Zealand cricket. it contained eight sixes and 45 boundary fours, crossing the boundary rope a record 53 times. The runs were scored in a day – the most runs scored in one day by a New Zealand batsman, and 199 of the runs were scored in one session between lunch and tea. The match was something of a festival occasion, with some elderly players in the fielding ranks, and Rutherford had not played with great distinction in the test matches. It is the highest innings in the history of the Scarborough Festival, as of 2015.

Upon being dropped from the New Zealand team in 1995, Rutherford moved to South Africa, where he played first-class cricket for five seasons, first for Transvaal and then for Gauteng (which replaced Transvaal in 1994), before finally retiring, scoring a duck in his last game.

== International career ==
Making his debut during New Zealand's tour of the West Indies in 1984–85 at the age of 19, Rutherford played in all four Test matches. Facing the West Indian pace attack, he endured a difficult time, scoring 0, 0 (run out without facing a ball), 4 (an edge through the slips), 0, 2, 1 and 5 in the series. Rutherford described that by the time the fourth test arrived "I was devastated emotionally. I couldn't handle the bombardment on the field and felt shell shocked off it".

He was not selected for the tour of Australia in 1985–86, but after scoring 638 runs at 53.16 with three centuries in the Shell Trophy he returned to the Test team when Australia toured New Zealand early in 1986, this time in the middle order, scoring two fifties in the three Tests.

Rutherford was a steady feature of the team after his return. However he had a habit of not converting fifties into centuries in Test cricket though he clearly had the ability to do so, as shown by his 35 first-class centuries. Arguably, Rutherford's greatest success came in One Day Internationals where he won ten matches as captain and made his highest international score, with 108 in a losing cause against India. He was a member of the New Zealand team which reached the semi-finals of the 1992 World Cup, their 2nd equal best performance in the tournament's history.

He captained New Zealand's team for three years, with two Test wins in 18 attempts in what was a difficult tenure as New Zealand struggled to find a replacement for the retired Richard Hadlee and suffered the decline in power of their only world class batsman, Martin Crowe. After Glenn Turner replaced Geoff Howarth as New Zealand coach, An in-depth review of the 1994/5 season was commissioned and received with senior players also consulted. In its aftermath, Rutherford was relieved of the captaincy and replaced with Canterbury captain Lee Germon who had never played a test match. Along with another experienced batsman, Andrew Jones, Rutherford was also dropped from the New Zealand team though Turner stated Rutherford and Jones would still be considered for selection in the future. Aged 29, Rutherford was keen to continue playing the game stating he still had much to offer while acknowledging the form slump of the team. Rutherford publicly supported Germon after he was designated captain, while former New Zealand wicketkeeper Tony Blain was publicly critical of Rutherford's removal by calling it a "bizarre decision" and Rutherford has been "scapegoated" by the selectors. Hadlee said in his view it was fair enough that Rutherford lost the captaincy but was very hard done by to be completely out of the squad.

== After cricket ==
In the 1997 New Year Honours, Rutherford was appointed a Member of the New Zealand Order of Merit, for services to cricket.

Rutherford published his autobiography, A Hell of a Way to Make a Living, in 1995. With Mike Crean he wrote a book for young cricketers, Ken Rutherford's Book of Cricket, in 1992.

After retirement from the playing team of the game, he coached the Irish national cricket team.

After coaching the Ireland national team for two years he followed his interest in horse racing, returning home to work as head bookmaker for the New Zealand TAB and then filled a similar role in Singapore. Back in South Africa he then worked as chief executive of racing broadcaster Tellytrack. Since 2013 (and as of 2014) he is general manager of the Waikato Racing Club. He left Waikato Racing Club to take up a similar role in New South Wales at the end of 2019.

He was also a cricket commentator for Sky Network Television.

Sporting positions
Preceded by Martin Crowe	New Zealand national cricket captain 1992/93–1994/95	Succeeded by Lee Germon
