= Tony Blain =

New Zealand cricketer (born 1962)

Personal information
- Full name: Tony Elston Blain
- Born: 17 February 1962 (age 64); Nelson, New Zealand
- Batting: Right-handed
- Role: Wicket-keeper

International information
- National side: New Zealand (1986–1994)
- Test debut (cap 160): 21 August 1986 v England
- Last Test: 24 February 1994 v Pakistan
- ODI debut (cap 53): 19 March 1986 v Australia
- Last ODI: 13 March 1994 v Pakistan

Career statistics
| Competition | Test | ODI | FC | LA |
|---|---|---|---|---|
| Matches | 11 | 38 | 118 | 110 |
| Runs scored | 456 | 442 | 5,749 | 1,726 |
| Batting average | 26.82 | 16.37 | 34.01 | 21.47 |
| 100s/50s | 0/2 | 0/0 | 8/32 | 0/6 |
| Top score | 78 | 49* | 161 | 70 |
| Balls bowled | – | – | 174 | – |
| Wickets | – | – | 2 | – |
| Bowling average | – | – | 64.00 | – |
| 5 wickets in innings | – | – | 0 | – |
| 10 wickets in match | – | – | 0 | – |
| Best bowling | – | – | 1/12 | – |
| Catches/stumpings | 19/2 | 37/1 | 210/26 | 108/16 |
- Source: Cricinfo, 4 February 2006

Tony Elston Blain (born 17 February 1962) is a former New Zealand cricketer, He played as a wicket-keeper for the New Zealand national cricket team in 11 Test matches and 38 One Day Internationals. He was primarily an understudy to Ian Smith and Adam Parore in the New Zealand side.

Domestically Blain played for Central Districts and then for Canterbury cricket team during the 1983–84 season under the captaincy of Roddy Fulton. Blain was a polished right handed batsman and excellent wicket keeper he also played cricket in the Bradford Cricket League in England, Bradford after leaving New Zealand in 1984.

After retiring from the game he went from coaching to a commentator and later became a teacher in the United Kingdom for Dixons Allerton Academy in Bradford.
