= List of West Indies One Day International cricket records =

One Day International (ODI) cricket is played between international cricket teams who are Full Members of the International Cricket Council (ICC) as well as the top four Associate members. Unlike Test matches, ODIs consist of one inning per team, having a limit in the number of overs, currently 50 overs per innings – although in the past this has been 55 or 60 overs. ODI cricket is List-A cricket, so statistics and records set in ODI matches also count toward List-A records. The earliest match recognised as an ODI was played between England and Australia in January 1971; since when there have been over 4,000 ODIs played by 28 teams. This is a list of West Indies Cricket team's One Day International records. It is based on the List of One Day International cricket records, but concentrates solely on records dealing with the West Indies cricket team. West Indies played its first ever ODI in 1973.

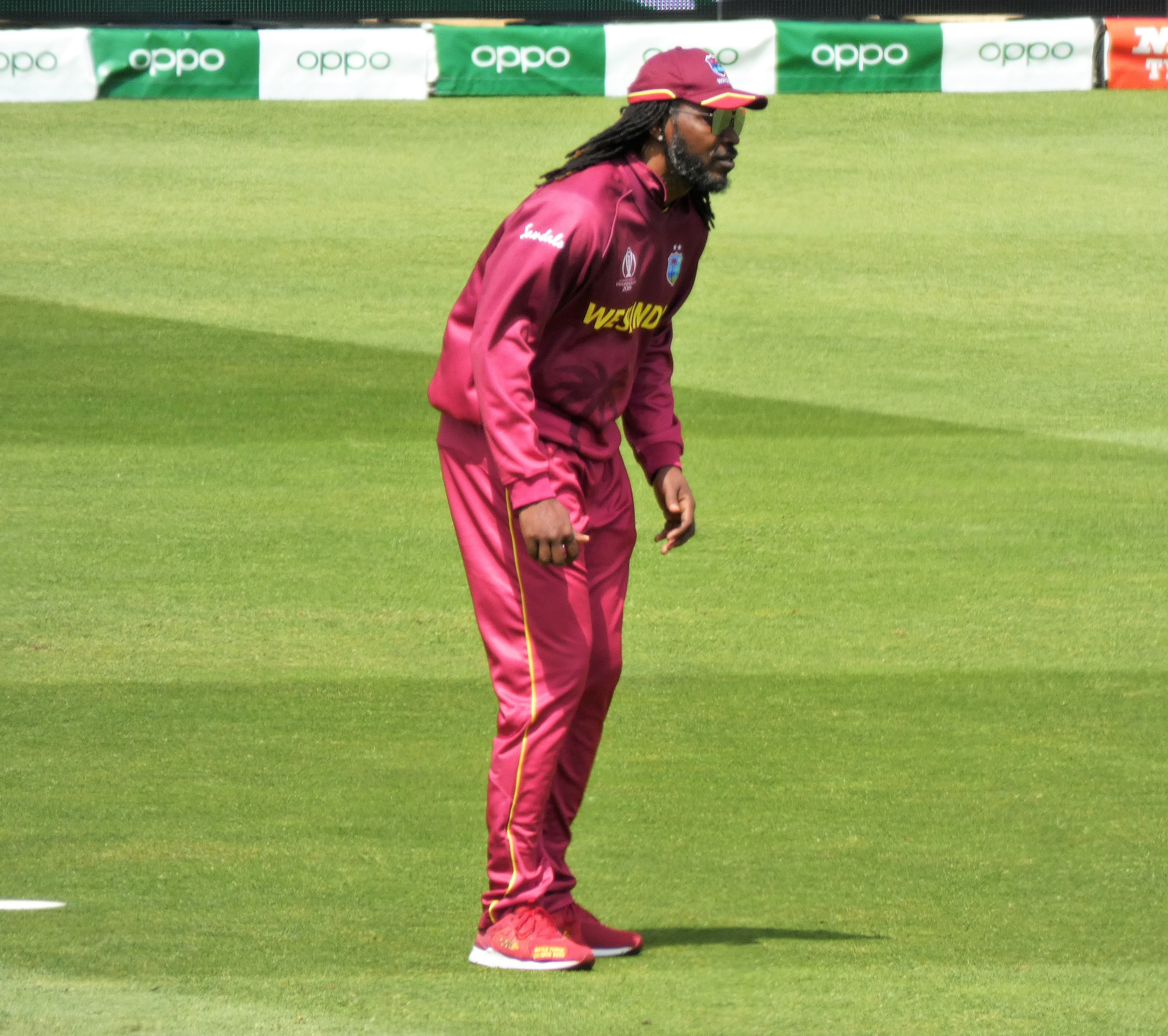
Chris Gayle holds the record for most matches, most runs, most centuries, highest individual score, most sixes and fours, most ducks, most catches and highest partnership for West Indies.

== Key ==
The top five records are listed for each category, except for the team wins, losses, draws and ties, all round records and partnership records. Tied records for fifth place are also included. Explanations of the general symbols and cricketing terms used in the list are given below. Specific details are provided in each category where appropriate. All records include matches played for West Indies only, and are correct as of February 2022.

Key
Symbol	Meaning
†	Player or umpire is currently active in ODI cricket
‡	Even took place during a Cricket World Cup
*	Player remained not out or partnership remained unbroken
♠	One Day International cricket record
Date	Starting date of the match
Innings	Number of innings played
Matches	Number of matches played
Opposition	The team West Indies was playing against
Period	The time period when the player was active in ODI cricket
Player	The player involved in the record
Venue	One Day International cricket ground where the match was played

== Team records ==
=== Overall record ===
Matches	Won	Lost	Tied	NR	Win%
891	429	420	11	31	48.14
Last Updated: 12 August 2025

=== Team wins, losses, draws and ties ===
As of August 2025, West Indies has played 891 ODI matches resulting in 429 victories, 420 defeats, 11 ties and 31 no results for an overall winning percentage of 48.14.

Opponent	Matches	Won	Lost	Tied	No Result	% Won	First	Last
Full Members
Afghanistan	9	5	3	0	1	62.5	2017	2019
Australia	146	61	79	3	3	41.78	1975	2024
Bangladesh	47	24	21	0	2	51.06	1999	2024
England	111	48	57	0	6	43.24	1973	2025
India	142	64	72	2	4	45.07	1979	2023
Ireland	18	12	4	0	2	66.66	2007	2025
New Zealand	68	31	30	0	7	51.72	1975	2022
Pakistan	140	73	64	3	0	52.14	1975	2025
South Africa	64	16	45	1	2	26.61	1992	2023
Sri Lanka	67	32	32	0	3	47.76	1975	2024
Zimbabwe	49	36	11	1	1	73.46	1983	2023
Associate Members
Bermuda	1	1	0	0	0	100	2008	2008
Canada	4	4	0	0	0	100	2003	2010
Kenya	6	5	1	0	0	83.33	1996	2011
Nepal	1	1	0	0	0	100	2023	2023
Netherlands	6	5	1	0	0	83.3	2007	2023
Oman	1	1	0	0	0	100	2023	2023
Papua New Guinea	1	1	0	0	0	100	2018	2018
Scotland	4	3	1	0	0	75.00	1999	2023
United Arab Emirates	5	5	0	0	0	100	2015	2023
United States	1	1	0	0	0	100	2023	2023
Total	891	429	420	11	31	48.14	1973	2025
Statistics are correct as of West Indies v Pakistan at Brian Lara Stadium, Tarouba, 12 August 2025.

=== First bilateral ODI series wins ===
Opponent	Year of first Home win	Year of first Away win
Afghanistan	-	2019
Australia	1984	-
Bangladesh	2004	1999
Canada	2010	YTP
England	1981	1976
India	1983	1983
Ireland	2010	YTP
Kenya	YTP	2001
New Zealand	1985	1986
Pakistan	1977	1980
South Africa	1992	-
Sri Lanka	1997	-
Zimbabwe	2006	2003
Last updated: 1 July 2020

=== First ODI match wins ===
Opponent	Home		Away / neutral	
Opponent	Venue	Year	Venue	Year
Afghanistan	Gros Islet	2017	Leeds	2019 ‡
Australia	St. John's	1978	London	1975 ‡
Bangladesh	Kingstown	2004	Dublin	1999 ‡
Bermuda	YTP	YTP	King City	2008
Canada	Kingston	2010	Centurion	2003 ‡
England	Kingstown	1981	London	1973
India	Port of Spain	1983	Birmingham	1979 ‡
Ireland	Kingston	2007 ‡	Mohali	2011 ‡
Kenya	YTP	YTP	Nairobi	2001
Netherlands	YTP	YTP	Dublin	2007
Nepal	YTP	YTP	Harare	2023 ‡
New Zealand	St. John's	1985	London	1975 ‡
Oman	YTP	YTP	Harare	2023 ‡
Pakistan	Albion	1977	Birmingham	1975
Papua New Guinea	YTP	YTP	Harare	2018
South Africa	Kingston	1992	Bloemfontein	1993
Scotland	YTP	YTP	Leicester	1999 ‡
Sri Lanka	Port of Spain	1997	Manchester	1975 ‡
United Arab Emirates	YTP	YTP	Napier	2015 ‡
United States	YTP	YTP	Harare	2023
Zimbabwe	Kingston	2000	Worcester	1983 ‡
Last updated: 22 June 2023

=== Team scoring records ===
==== Most runs in an innings ====
The highest innings total scored in ODIs came in the match between England and Australia in June 2018. Playing in the third ODI at Trent Bridge in Nottingham, the hosts posted a total of 481/6. The fourth ODI against England in February 2019 saw West Indies set their highest innings total of 389.

Rank	Score	Opposition	Venue	Date	Scorecard
1	405/7	India	Assam Cricket Association Stadium, Guwahati, India	30 September 2026	Scorecard
2	389	England	National Cricket Stadium, St. George's, Grenada	27 February 2019	Scorecard
3	385/7	Ireland	Castle Avenue, Dublin, Ireland	25 May 2025	Scorecard
4	381/3	Ireland	Castle Avenue, Dublin, Ireland	5 May 2019	Scorecard
5	374/6	Netherlands	Takashinga Sports Club, Harare, Zimbabwe	26 June 2023	Scorecard
Last updated: 30 September 2026

==== Fewest runs in an innings ====
The lowest innings total scored in ODIs has been scored twice. Zimbabwe were dismissed for 35 by Sri Lanka during the third ODI in Sri Lanka's tour of Zimbabwe in April 2004 and USA were dismissed for same score by Nepal in the sixth ODI of the 2020 ICC Cricket World League 2 in Nepal in February 2020. The lowest score in ODI history for West Indies is 54 scored against South Africa during the West Indies' tour of South Africa in early 2004.

Rank	Score	Opposition	Venue	Date	Scorecard
1	54	South Africa	Sahara Park Newlands, Cape Town, South Africa	25 January 2004	Scorecard
2	61	Bangladesh	Zohur Ahmed Chowdhury Stadium, Chittagong, Bangladesh	18 October 2011	Scorecard
3	70	Australia	WACA, Perth, Australia	1 February 2013	Scorecard
4	80	Sri Lanka	Brabourne Stadium, Mumbai, India	14 October 2006	Scorecard
5	86	Australia	Manuka Oval, Canberra, Australia	6 February 2024	Scorecard
Last updated: 6 February 2024

==== Most runs conceded an innings ====
The second ODI of the 2015 ODI Series against South Africa saw West Indies concede their highest innings total of 439/2.

Rank	Score	Opposition	Venue	Date	Scorecard
1	439/2	South Africa	New Wanderers Stadium, Johannesburg, South Africa	18 January 2015	Scorecard
2	418/5	India	Holkar Cricket Stadium, Indore, India	8 December 2011	Scorecard
3	418/6	England	National Cricket Stadium, St. George's, Grenada	27 February 2019	Scorecard
4	408/5	South Africa	Sydney Cricket Ground, Sydney, Australia	27 February 2015 ‡	Scorecard
5	406/2	India	Assam Cricket Association Stadium, Guwahati, India	30 September 2026	Scorecard
Last updated: 29 May 2025

==== Fewest runs conceded in an innings ====
The lowest score conceded by West Indies for a full inning is 43 scored by Pakistan in the 1992-93 Total International Series at Sahara Park Newlands, Cape Town, South Africa.

Rank	Score	Opposition	Venue	Date	Scorecard
1	43	Pakistan	Sahara Park Newlands, Cape Town, South Africa	25 February 1993	Scorecard
2	55	Sri Lanka	Sharjah Cricket Stadium, Sharjah, United Arab Emirates	3 December 1986	Scorecard
3	58	Bangladesh	Shere Bangla National Stadium, Dhaka, Bangladesh	4 March 2011	Scorecard
4	68	Scotland	Grace Road, Leicester, England	27 May 1999 ‡	Scorecard
5	70	Bangladesh	National Cricket Stadium, St. George's, Grenada	22 August 2014	Scorecard
Last updated: 1 July 2020

==== Most runs aggregate in a match ====
The highest match aggregate scored in ODIs came in the match between South Africa and Australia in the fifth ODI of March 2006 series at Wanderers Stadium, Johannesburg when South Africa scored 438/9 in response to Australia's 434/4. The fourth ODI against England | National Cricket Stadium, St. George's, Grenada in February 2019 saw a total of 807 runs being scored.

Rank	Aggregate	Scores	Venue	Date	Scorecard
1	807/9	West Indies (405/7) v India (406/2)	Assam Cricket Association Stadium, Guwahati, India	30 September 2026	Scorecard
2	807/16	England (418/6) v West Indies (389)	National Cricket Stadium, St. George's, Grenada	27 February 2019	Scorecard
3	748/15	West Indies (374-6) v Netherlands (374-9)	Takashinga Sports Club, Harare, Zimbabwe	26 June 2023	Scorecard
4	730/9	South Africa (439/2) v West Indies (291/7)	New Wanderers Stadium, Johannesburg, South Africa	18 January 2015	Scorecard
5	724/12	West Indies (360/8) v England (364/4)	Kensington Oval, Bridgetown, Barbados	20 February 2019	Scorecard
Last updated: 1 July 2020

==== Fewest runs aggregate in a match ====
The lowest match aggregate in ODIs is 71 when USA were dismissed for 35 by Nepal in the sixth ODI of the 2020 ICC Cricket World League 2 in Nepal in February 2020. The lowest match aggregate in ODI history for West Indies is 88 scored ninth match of the 1992-93 Total International Series against Pakistan, which is fifth lowest of all time.

Rank	Aggregate	Scores	Venue	Date	Scorecard
1	88/13	Pakistan (43) v West Indies (45/3)	Sahara Park Newlands, Cape Town, South Africa	25 February 1993	Scorecard
2	106/7	New Zealand (51/3) v West Indies (55/4)	Queen's Park Oval, Port of Spain, Trinidad & Tobago	27 March 1985	Scorecard
3	117/11	Bangladesh (58) v West Indies (59/1)	Shere-e-Bangla Stadium, Mirpur, Bangladesh	4 March 2011 ‡	Scorecard
4	123/12	West Indies (61) v Bangladesh (62/2)	Zohur Ahmed Chowdhury Stadium, Chittagong, Bangladesh	18 October 2011	Scorecard
5	138/12	Scotland (68) v West Indies (70/2)	Grace Road, Leicester, England	27 May 1999 ‡	Scorecard
Last updated: 1 July 2020

=== Result records ===
An ODI match is won when one side has scored more runs than the total runs scored by the opposing side during their innings. If both sides have completed both their allocated innings and the side that fielded last has the higher aggregate of runs, it is known as a win by runs. This indicates the number of runs that they had scored more than the opposing side. If the side batting last wins the match, it is known as a win by wickets, indicating the number of wickets that were still to fall.

==== Greatest win margins (by runs) ====
The greatest winning margin by runs in ODIs was England's victory over South Africa by 342 runs in the third and final ODI of South Africa's 2025 tour of England. The largest victory recorded by West Indies was during the 2011 Cricket World Cup by 215 runs against the Netherlands in Arun Jaitley Stadium, New Delhi, India.

Rank	Margin	Target	Opposition	Venue	Date
1	215 Runs	331	Netherlands	Arun Jaitley Stadium, New Delhi, India	28 February 2011 ‡
2	208 Runs	317	Canada	Sabina Park, Kingston, Jamaica	13 April 2010
3	203 Runs	364	New Zealand	Seddon Park, Hamilton, New Zealand	8 January 2014
4	202 Runs	295	Pakistan	Brian Lara Cricket Academy, San Fernando, Trinidad and Tobago	12 August 2025
5	197 Runs	386	Ireland	Clontarf Cricket Club Ground, Dublin, Ireland	25 May 2025
Last updated: 12 August 2025

==== Greatest win margins (by balls remaining) ====
The greatest winning margin by balls remaining in ODIs was England's victory over Canada by 8 wickets with 277 balls remaining in the 1979 Cricket World Cup. The largest victory recorded by West Indies is during the 1999 Cricket World Cup when they won by 8 wickets with 239 balls remaining against Scotland at Grace Road, Leicester, England.

Rank	Balls remaining	Margin	Opposition	Venue	Date
1	239	8 wickets	Scotland	Grace Road, Leicester, England	27 May 1999 ‡
2	236	9 wickets	Sri Lanka	Old Trafford, Manchester, England	7 June 1975 ‡
3	227	7 wickets	England	Darren Sammy National Cricket Stadium, Gros Islet, Saint Lucia	2 March 2019
4	226	9 wickets	Bangladesh	Shere-e-Bangla Stadium, Mirpur, Bangladesh	4 March 2011 ‡
5	225	7 wickets	Pakistan	Sahara Park Newlands, Cape Town, South Africa	25 February 1993
Last updated: 1 July 2020

==== Greatest win margins (by wickets) ====
A total of 55 matches have ended with chasing team winning by 10 wickets with West Indies winning by such margins a record 10 times.

Rank	Margin	Opposition	Most recent venue	Date
1	10 wickets	Zimbabwe	Edgbaston, Birmingham, England	20 June 1983 ‡
1	10 wickets	New Zealand	Queen's Park Oval, Port of Spain, Trinidad & Tobago	17 April 1985
1	10 wickets	New Zealand	AMI Stadium, Christchurch, NZ	28 March 1987
1	10 wickets	Pakistan	Melbourne Cricket Ground, Melbourne, Australia	23 February 1992 ‡
1	10 wickets	South Africa	Queen's Park Oval, Port of Spain, Trinidad & Tobago	11 April 1992
1	10 wickets	India	Kensington Oval, Bridgetown, Barbados	3 May 1997
1	10 wickets	Zimbabwe	Darren Sammy National Cricket Stadium, Gros Islet, Saint Lucia	10 May 2006
1	10 wickets	Bangladesh	Sawai Mansingh Stadium, Jaipur, India	11 October 2006
1	10 wickets	Netherlands	Clontarf Cricket Club Ground, Dublin, Ireland	10 July 2007
1	10 wickets	Pakistan	Providence Stadium, Providence, West Indies	5 May 2011
Last updated: 3 December 2017

==== Highest successful run chases ====
South Africa holds the record for the highest successful run chase which they achieved when they scored 438/9 in response to Australia's 434/9. West Indies's highest innings total while chasing is 331/5 in a successful run chase against Ireland at Malahide Cricket Club Ground, Dublin, Ireland during the 2019 Ireland Tri-Nation Series.

Rank	Score	Target	Opposition	Venue	Date
1	352/5	352	India	Maharaja Yadavindra Singh International Cricket Stadium, New Chandigarh, India	3 October 2026
2	331/5	328	Ireland	Malahide Cricket Club Ground, Dublin, Ireland	11 May 2019
3	326/6	326	England	Sir Vivian Richards Stadium, North Sound, Antigua and Barbuda	3 December 2023
4	325/6	322	Bangladesh	Warner Park Sporting Complex, Basseterre, St Kitts and Nevis	10 December 2024
5	309/6	309	Pakistan	Providence Stadium, Providence, Guyana	7 April 2017
Last updated: 1 July 2020

==== Narrowest win margins (by runs) ====
The narrowest run margin victory is by 1 run which has been achieved in 31 ODI's with Australia winning such games a record 6 times. West Indies have recorded a victory by such margin on three occasions.

Rank	Margin	Opposition	Venue	Date
1	1 run	Australia	Sydney Cricket Ground, Sydney, Australia	13 December 1988
1	1 run	India	Sabina Park, Kingston, Jamaica	20 May 2006
1	1 run	Pakistan	Kensington Oval, Bridgetown, Barbados	2 May 2011
4	2 Runs	England	Melbourne Cricket Ground, Melbourne, Australia	20 January 1980
4	2 Runs	England	Arnos Vale Stadium, Kingstown, Saint Vincent & the Grenadines	4 February 1981
4	2 Runs	India	Sardar Patel Stadium, Ahmedabad, India	7 January 1988
Last updated: 1 July 2020

==== Narrowest win margins (by balls remaining) ====
The narrowest winning margin by balls remaining in ODIs is by winning of the last ball which has been achieved 36 times with South Africa winning seven times. West Indies has achieved a victory by this margin on six occasions.

Rank	Balls remaining	Margin	Opposition	Venue	Date
1	0	4 wickets	Pakistan	National Stadium, Karachi, Pakistan	21 November 1980
1	0	3 wickets	England	Sabina Park, Kingston, Jamaica	3 March 1990
1	0	3 wickets	South Africa	Sabina Park, Kingston, Jamaica	28 April 2001
1	0	4 wickets	New Zealand	Arnos Vale Stadium, Kingstown, Saint Vincent & the Grenadines	16 June 2002
1	0	4 wickets	India	Keenan Stadium, Jamshedpur, India	6 November 2002
1	0	1 wicket	Sri Lanka	Queen's Park Oval, Port of Spain, Trinidad & Tobago	10 April 2008
Last updated: 1 July 2020

==== Narrowest win margins (by wickets) ====
The narrowest margin of victory by wickets is 1 wicket which has settled 55 such ODIs. The West Indies have recorded such victory on 12 occasions.

Rank	Margin	Opposition	Venue	Date
1	1 wicket	Pakistan	Edgbaston, Birmingham, England	11 June 1975 ‡
1	1 wicket	Pakistan	Brisbane Cricket Ground, Brisbane, Australia	16 January 1982
1	1 wicket	Pakistan	Adelaide Oval, Adelaide, Australia	28 January 1984
1	1 wicket	Pakistan	Sharjah Cricket Stadium, Sharjah, United Arab Emirates	17 October 1991
1	1 wicket	New Zealand	Sabina Park, Kingston, Jamaica	26 March 1996 ‡
1	1 wicket	England	Kensington Oval, Bridgetown, Barbados	1 April 1998
1	1 wicket	Zimbabwe	Brisbane Cricket Ground, Brisbane, Australia	13 January 2001
1	1 wicket	Bangladesh	Arnos Vale Stadium, Kingstown, Saint Vincent & the Grenadines	15 May 2004
1	1 wicket	Sri Lanka	Queen's Park Oval, Port of Spain, Trinidad & Tobago	10 April 2008
1	1 wicket	India	Sabina Park, Kingston, Jamaica	30 June 2013
1	1 wicket	South Africa	Axxess DSL St. Georges, Port Elizabeth, South Africa	25 January 2015
1	1 wicket	Ireland	Kensington Oval, Bridgetown, Barbados	9 January 2020
Last updated: 1 July 2020

==== Greatest loss margins (by runs) ====
West Indies's biggest defeat by runs was against South Africa in the 2015 Cricket World Cup at Sydney Cricket Ground, Sydney, Australia.

Rank	Margin	Opposition	Venue	Date
1	257 Runs	South Africa	Sydney Cricket Ground, Sydney, Australia	27 February 2015 ‡
2	238 Runs	England	Edgbaston, Birmingham, England	29 May 2025
3	224 Runs	India	Brabourne Stadium, Mumbai, India	29 October 2018
4	209 Runs	South Africa	Sahara Park Newlands, Cape Town, South Africa	25 January 2004
5	204 Runs	New Zealand	Hagley Oval, Christchurch, New Zealand	23 December 2017
Last updated: 1 July 2020

==== Greatest loss margins (by balls remaining) ====
The greatest winning margin by balls remaining in ODIs was England's victory over Canada by 8 wickets with 277 balls remaining in the 1979 Cricket World Cup. The largest defeat suffered by West Indies was against Australia in Australia during the West Indies tour of Australia in 2012-13 when they lost by 9 wickets with 244 balls remaining.

Rank	Balls remaining	Margin	Opposition	Venue	Date
1	244	9 wickets	Australia	WACA, Perth, Australia	1 February 2013
2	220	9 wickets	Sri Lanka	Brabourne Stadium, Mumbai, India	14 October 2006
3	211	9 wickets	India	Greenfield International Stadium, Thiruvananthapuram, India	1 November 2018
4	180	8 wickets	Bangladesh	Zohur Ahmed Chowdhury Stadium, Chittagong, Bangladesh	18 October 2011
5	177	7 wickets	New Zealand	Westpac Stadium, Wellington, New Zealand	7 January 2009
Last updated: 1 July 2020

==== Greatest loss margins (by wickets) ====
West Indies have lost an ODI match by a margin of 10 wickets on three occasions with most recent being during the West Indies's tour of India in 2018.

Rank	Margins	Opposition	Venue	Date
1	10 wickets	India	Queen's Park Oval, Port of Spain, Trinidad & Tobago	27 April 1997
1	10 wickets	England	County Ground, Chester-le-Street, England	15 July 2000
1	10 wickets	Australia	Adelaide Oval, Adelaide, Australia	26 January 2001
1	10 wickets	Pakistan	Shere-e-Bangla Stadium, Mirpur, Bangladesh	23 March 2011 ‡
5	9 wickets	8 occasions		
Last updated: 1 July 2020

==== Narrowest loss margins (by runs) ====
The narrowest loss of West Indies in terms of runs is by 1 run, suffered five times.

Rank	Margin	Opposition	Venue	Date
1	1 run	Sri Lanka	Sharjah Cricket Stadium, Sharjah, United Arab Emirates	21 October 1991
1	1 run	Pakistan	Kensington Oval, Bridgetown, Barbados	11 May 2005
1	1 run	South Africa	Warner Park, Basseterre, Saint Kitts & Nevis	4 July 2008
1	1 run	Australia	Providence Stadium, Providence, Guyana	20 March 2009
1	1 run	Sri Lanka	Queens Sports Club, Bulawayo, Zimbabwe	23 November 2016
Last updated: 1 July 2020

==== Narrowest loss margins (by balls remaining) ====
The narrowest winning margin by balls remaining in ODIs is by winning of the last ball which has been achieved 36 times with both South Africa winning seven times. West Indies has suffered a loss by this margin seven times.

Rank	Balls remaining	Margin	Opposition	Venue	Date
1	0	2 wickets	Australia	Mindoo Phillip Park, Castries, Saint Lucia	12 April 1978
1	0	5 wickets	England	Queen's Park Oval, Port of Spain, Trinidad & Tobago	4 March 1986
1	0	1 wicket	Pakistan	Gaddafi Stadium, Lahore, Pakistan	16 October 1987 ‡
1	0	1 wicket	Australia	Sydney Cricket Ground, Sydney, Australia	1 January 1996
1	0	2 wickets	South Africa	New Wanderers Stadium, Johannesburg, South Africa	22 January 1999
1	0	2 wickets	South Africa	Sinhalese Sports Club Ground, Colombo, Sri Lanka	13 September 2002
1	0	7 wickets	South Africa	Windsor Park, Roseau, Dominica	30 May 2010
Last updated: 1 July 2020

==== Narrowest loss margins (by wickets) ====
West Indies has suffered defeat by 1 wicket on ten occasions.

Rank	Margin	Opposition	Venue	Date
1	1 wicket	England	Headingley, Leeds, England	5 September 1973
1	1 wicket	New Zealand	AMI Stadium, Christchurch, NZ	6 February 1980
1	1 wicket	Pakistan	Gaddafi Stadium, Lahore, Pakistan	16 October 1987 ‡
1	1 wicket	England	Edgbaston, Birmingham, England	23 May 1991
1	1 wicket	Australia	Sydney Cricket Ground, Sydney, Australia	1 January 1996
1	1 wicket	England	Kensington Oval, Bridgetown, Barbados	21 April 2007 ‡
1	1 wicket	South Africa	Queen's Park Oval, Port of Spain, Trinidad & Tobago	3 June 2010
1	1 wicket	India	Barabati Stadium, Cuttack, India	29 November 2011
1	1 wicket	Sri Lanka	Ranasinghe Premadasa Stadium, Colombo, Sri Lanka	1 November 2015
1	1 wicket	Sri Lanka	Sinhalese Sports Club Ground, Colombo, Sri Lanka	22 February 2020
Last updated: 1 July 2020

==== Tied matches ====
A tie can occur when the scores of both teams are equal at the conclusion of play, provided that the side batting last has completed their innings. There have been 37 ties in ODI's history with West Indies involved in ten such games.

Opposition	Venue	Date
Australia	Melbourne Cricket Ground, Melbourne, Australia	11 February 1984
Pakistan	Gaddafi Stadium, Lahore, Pakistan	22 November 1991
India	WACA, Perth, Australia	6 December 1991
Pakistan	Bourda, Georgetown, Guyana	3 April 1993
Australia	Bourda, Georgetown, Guyana	21 April 1999
Australia	Arnos Vale Stadium, Kingstown, Saint Vincent & the Grenadines	20 March 2012
South Africa	SWALEC Stadium, Cardiff, England	14 June 2013
Pakistan	Darren Sammy National Cricket Stadium, Gros Islet, Saint Lucia	19 July 2013
Zimbabwe	Queens Sports Club, Bulawayo, Zimbabwe	19 November 2016
India	APCA-VDCA Stadium, Visakhapatnam, India	24 October 2018
Netherlands	Takashinga Sports Club, Harare, Zimbabwe	26 June 2023
Last updated: 3 December 2017

== Individual records ==
=== Batting records ===
==== Most career runs ====
A run is the basic means of scoring in cricket. A run is scored when the batsman hits the ball with his bat and with his partner runs the length of 22 yards (20 m) of the pitch. India's Sachin Tendulkar has scored the most runs in ODIs with 18,246. Second is Kumar Sangakkara of Sri Lanka with 14,234 ahead of Ricky Ponting from Australia in third with 13,704. Chris Gayle is the leading West Indian on this list.

Rank	Runs	Player	Matches	Innings	Average	100	50	Period
1	10,425	Chris Gayle	298	291	38.04	25	53	1999–2019
2	10,348	Brian Lara	295	285	40.90	19	62	1990–2007
3	8,778	Shivnarine Chanderpaul	268	251	41.60	11	59	1994–2011
4	8,648	Desmond Haynes	238	237	41.37	17	57	1978–1994
5	6,721	Viv Richards	187	167	47.00	11	45	1975–1991
6	6,248	Richie Richardson	224	217	33.41	5	44	1983–1996
7	6,097	Shai Hope†	147	142	50.80	19	30	2016–2025
8	5,804	Ramnaresh Sarwan	181	169	42.67	5	38	2000–2013
9	5,761	Carl Hooper	227	206	35.34	7	29	1987–2003
10	5,606	Marlon Samuels	207	196	32.97	10	30	2000–2018
Last updated: 19 November 2025

==== Fastest runs getter ====
Runs	Batsman	Match	Innings	Record Date	Reference
1000	Viv Richards	22	21	22 January 1980	
2000	Shai Hope	51	47	7 May 2019	
3000	Shai Hope	72	67	22 December 2019	
4000	Viv Richards	96	88	14 April 1985	
5000	Viv Richards	126	114	30 January 1987	
6000	Viv Richards	156	141	7 January 1989	
7000	Brian Lara	187	183	6 May 2001	
8000	Brian Lara	216	211	1 June 2003	
9000	Brian Lara	246	239	14 January 2005	
10000	Brian Lara	287	278	16 December 2006	

==== Most runs in each batting position ====
Batting position	Batsman	Innings	Runs	Average	Career span	Ref
Opener	Chris Gayle	271	10,124	39.7	1999–2019	
Number 3	Brian Lara	106	4,447	45.84	1990–2007	
Number 4	Viv Richards	81	3,373	48.88	1975–1991	
Number 5	Carl Hooper	82	2,322	35.18	1987–2003	
Number 6	Kieron Pollard	66	1,509	25.15	2007–2022	
Number 7	Jason Holder†	50	965	25.39	2016–2024	
Number 8	Darren Sammy	58	836	22.59	2007–2015	
Number 9	Curtly Ambrose	32	301	15.84	1988–2000	
Number 10	Curtly Ambrose	49	258	8.06	1988–2000	
Number 11	Courtney Walsh	55	165	5.89	1984–2000	
Last updated: 22 June 2023

==== Most runs against each team ====
Opposition	Runs	Player	Matches	Innings	Span	Ref
Afghanistan	455	Shai Hope†	9	8	2017–2019	
Australia	2,262	Desmond Haynes	64	64	1978–1993	
Bangladesh	956	Shai Hope†	19	19	2018–2025	
Bermuda	49	Ramnaresh Sarwan	1	1	2008–2008	
Canada	161	Xavier Marshall	2	2	2008–2008	
England	1,632	Chris Gayle	36	34	2000–2019	
India	1,357	Desmond Haynes	36	36	1979–1992	
Ireland	476	Shai Hope†	12	12	2018–2025	
Kenya	384	Chris Gayle	5	5	2001–2003	
Nepal	132	Shai Hope†	1	1	2023–2023	
Netherlands	235	Brandon King†	4	4	2022–2023	
New Zealand	1,068	Brian Lara	28	26	1992–2007	
Oman	100	Brandon King†	1	1	2023–2023	
Pakistan	2,390	Desmond Haynes	65	65	1979–1993	
Papua New Guinea	99	Jason Holder†	1	1	2018–2018	
Scotland	85	Chris Gayle	2	2	2007–2018	
South Africa	1,559	Shivnarine Chanderpaul	39	39	1996–2011	
Sri Lanka	1,122	Brian Lara	25	25	1992–2007	
United Arab Emirates	176	Brandon King†	2	2	2023–2023	
United States	66	Johnson Charles†	1	1	2018–2018	
Zimbabwe	1,549	Chris Gayle	30	30	2000–2018	
Last updated: 23 October 2025

==== Highest individual score ====
The fourth ODI of the Sri Lanka's tour of India in 2014 saw Rohit Sharma score the highest Individual score. Chris Gayle holds the West Indian record when he scored 215 against Zimbabwe in the 2015 Cricket World Cup.

Rank	Runs	Player	Opposition	Venue	Date
1	215	Chris Gayle	Zimbabwe	Manuka Oval, Canberra, Australia	24 February 2015 ‡
2	189*	Viv Richards	England	Old Trafford, Manchester, England	31 May 1984
3	181	Viv Richards	Sri Lanka	National Stadium, Karachi, Pakistan	13 October 1987 ‡
4	179	John Campbell†	Ireland	Clontarf Cricket Club Ground, Dublin, Ireland	5 May 2019
5	176*	Evin Lewis	England	The Oval, London, England	27 September 2017
Last updated: 1 July 2020

==== Highest individual score – progression of record ====
Runs	Player	Opponent	Venue	Season
55	Rohan Kanhai	England	Headingley, Leeds, England	1973
105	Roy Fredericks	England	The Oval, London, England	1973
119*	Viv Richards	England	North Marine Road Ground, Scarborough, England	1976
148	Desmond Haynes	Australia	Antigua Recreation Ground, St. John's, Antigua & Barbuda	1977–78
153*	Viv Richards	Australia	Melbourne Cricket Ground, Melbourne, Australia	1979–80
189*	Viv Richards	England	Old Trafford, Manchester, England	1984
215	Chris Gayle	Zimbabwe	Manuka Oval, Canberra, Australia	2014–15 ‡
Last updated: 1 July 2020

==== Highest score against each opponent ====
Opposition	Player	Score	Date
Afghanistan	Shai Hope	109*	11 November 2019
Australia	Viv Richards	153*	9 December 1979
Bangladesh	Denesh Ramdin	169	25 August 2014
Bermuda	Ramnaresh Sarwan	49*	20 August 2008
Canada	Xavier Marshall	157*	22 August 2008
England	Viv Richards	189*	31 May 1984
India	Desmond Haynes	152*	21 March 1989
Ireland	John Campbell	179	5 May 2019
Kenya	Chris Gayle	152	15 August 2001
Netherlands	Kyle Mayers	120	4 June 2022
Nepal	Shai Hope	132	22 June 2023 ‡
New Zealand	Brian Lara	146*	30 March 1996
Oman	Brandon King	100	5 July 2023
Pakistan	Brian Lara	156	28 January 2005
Papua New Guinea	Jason Holder	99*	8 March 2018
South Africa	Chris Gayle	152*	4 February 2004
Scotland	Chris Gayle	85*	12 July 2007
Sri Lanka	Viv Richards	181	13 October 1987 ‡
United Arab Emirates	Shimron Hetmyer	127	6 March 2018
United States	Johnson Charles	66	18 June 2023
Zimbabwe	Chris Gayle	215	24 February 2015 ‡
Source: Cricinfo. Last updated: 22 June 2023.

s batting average is the total number of runs they have scored divided by the number of times they have been dismissed.

Rank	Average	Player	Innings	Runs	Not out	Period
1	50.80	Shai Hope†	142	6,097	22	2016–2025
2	47.00	Viv Richards	167	6,721	24	1975–1991
3	45.04	Gordon Greenidge	127	5,134	13	1975–1991
4	42.68	Ramnaresh Sarwan	169	5,804	33	2000–2013
5	41.60	Shivnarine Chanderpaul	251	8,778	40	1994–2011
Qualification: 20 innings. Last updated: 19 November 2025

==== Highest average in each batting position ====
Batting position	Batsman	Innings	Runs	Average	Career span	Ref
Opener	Shai Hope†	49	2,612	60.74♠	2016–2024	
Number 3	Viv Richards	51	2,418	57.57	1975–1991	
Number 4	Ramnaresh Sarwan	55	2,223	54.21	2001–2013	
Number 5	Marlon Samuels	20	668	51.38	2001–2018	
Number 6	Shivnarine Chanderpaul	22	715	42.05	1994–2011	
Number 7	Darren Sammy	31	714	27.46	2008–2015	
Number 8	Andre Russell†	20	405	23.82	2011–2019	
Number 9	Curtly Ambrose	32	301	15.84	1988–2000	
Number 10	Sunil Narine	26	202	9.18	2011–2016	
Number 11	Kemar Roach†	25	65	10.83	2010–2022	
Last updated: 21 March 2023. Qualification: Min 20 innings batted at position

==== Most half-centuries ====
A half-century is a score of between 50 and 99 runs. Statistically, once a batsman's score reaches 100, it is no longer considered a half-century but a century.

Sachin Tendulkar of India has scored the most half-centuries in ODIs with 96. He is followed by the Sri Lanka's Kumar Sangakkara on 93, South Africa's Jacques Kallis on 86 and India's Rahul Dravid and Pakistan's Inzamam-ul-Haq on 83. Brian Lara has scored most half-centuries for West Indies.

Rank	Half centuries	Player	Innings	Runs	Period
1	62	Brian Lara	285	10,348	1990–2007
2	59	Shivnarine Chanderpaul	251	8,778	1994–2011
3	57	Desmond Haynes	237	8,648	1978–1994
4	53	Chris Gayle	291	10,425	1999–2019
5	45	Viv Richards	167	6,721	1975–1991
Last updated: 1 July 2020

==== Most centuries ====
A century is a score of 100 or more runs in a single innings.

Tendulkar has also scored the most centuries in ODIs with 49. Chris Gayle has the most centuries for West Indies.

Rank	Centuries	Player	Innings	Runs	Period
1	25	Chris Gayle	291	10,425	1999–2019
2	19	Brian Lara	285	10,348	1990–2007
3	19	Shai Hope†	142	6,097	2016–2025
4	17	Desmond Haynes	237	8,648	1978–1994
5	11	Viv Richards	167	6,721	1975–1991
5	11	Gordon Greenidge	127	5,134	1975–1991
5	11	Shivnarine Chanderpaul	251	8,778	1994–2011
Last updated: 19 November 2025

==== Most sixes ====
Rank	Sixes	Player	Innings	Runs	Period
1	330	Chris Gayle	291	10,425	1999–2019
2	135	Kieron Pollard	113	2,706	2007–2022
3	133+	Brian Lara	285	10,348	1990–2007
4	126+	Viv Richards	167	6,721	1975–1991
5	120	Shai Hope†	196	5,606	2000–2018
Last updated: 19 November 2025

==== Most fours ====
Rank	Fours	Player	Innings	Runs	Period
1	1,120	Chris Gayle	291	10,425	1999–2019
2	1,032+	Brian Lara	285	10,348	1990–2007
3	768+	Desmond Haynes	237	8,648	1978–1994
4	722	Shivnarine Chanderpaul	251	8,778	1994–2011
5	600+	Viv Richards	167	6,721	1975–1991
Last updated: 1 July 2020

==== Highest strike rates ====
Andre Russell of West Indies holds the record for highest strike rate, with minimum 500 balls faced qualification, with 130.22.

Rank	Strike rate	Player	Runs	Balls faced	Period
1	130.22	Andre Russell†	1,034	794	2011–2019
2	105.39	Shimron Hetmyer†	1,543	1,464	2017–2021
3	100.05	Darren Sammy	1,871	1,870	2004–2015
4	99.15	Nicholas Pooran†	1,983	2,000	2019–2023
5	97.85	Ashley Nurse	502	513	2016–2019
Qualification: 500 balls faced. Last updated: 1 June 2025

==== Highest strike rates in an inning ====
James Franklin of New Zealand's strike rate of 387.50 during his 31* off 8 balls against Canada during 2011 Cricket World Cup is the world record for highest strike rate in an innings. Andre Russell holds the top position for a West Indies player with his innings of 42* off 13 balls against Pakistan during the 2015 Cricket World Cup.

Rank	Strike rate	Player	Runs	Balls faced	Opposition	Venue	Date
1	323.08	Andre Russell†	42*	13	Pakistan	Hagley Oval, Christchurch, New Zealand	21 February 2015 ‡
2	312.50	Ashley Nurse	25*	8	England	Kensington Oval, Bridgetown, Barbados	20 February 2019
3	285.19	Chris Gayle	77	27	England	Darren Sammy National Cricket Stadium, Gros Islet, Saint Lucia	2 March 2019
4	276.92	Jason Holder†	36	13	Sri Lanka	Ranasinghe Premadasa Stadium, Colombo, Sri Lanka	1 November 2015
5	258.33	Ashley Nurse	31*	12	England	Rose Bowl, Southampton, England	29 September 2017
Last updated: 1 July 2020

==== Most runs in a calendar year ====
Tendulkar holds the record for most runs scored in a calendar year with 1894 runs scored in 1998. Brian Lara scored 1349 runs in 1993, the most for a West Indies batsmen in a year.

Rank	Runs	Player	Matches	Innings	Year
1	1,349	Brian Lara	30	30	1993
2	1,345	Shai Hope†	28	26	2019
3	1,232	Desmond Haynes	27	27	1985
4	1,231	Viv Richards	29	25	1985
5	1,217	Chris Gayle	32	32	2006
Last updated: 1 July 2020

==== Most runs in a series ====
The 1980-81 Benson & Hedges World Series Cup in Australia saw Greg Chappell set the record for the most runs scored in a single series scoring 685 runs. He is followed by Sachin Tendulkar with 673 runs scored in the 2003 Cricket World Cup. Viv Richards has scored the most runs in a series for a West Indies batsmen, when he scored 651 runs in the 1984-85 Benson & Hedges World Series.

Rank	Runs	Player	Matches	Innings	Series
1	651	Viv Richards	7	7	1979-80 Benson & Hedges World Series
2	536	Viv Richards	13	11	1984-85 Benson & Hedges World Series
3	514	Viv Richards	14	14	1981-82 Benson & Hedges World Series
4	513	Desmond Haynes	12	12	1984-85 Benson & Hedges World Series
5	485	Desmond Haynes	11	11	1988-89 Benson & Hedges World Series
Last updated: 1 July 2020

==== Most ducks ====
A duck refers to a batsman being dismissed without scoring a run. Sanath Jayasuriya has scored the equal highest number of ducks in ODIs with 34 such knocks. West Indies's Chris Gayle with 24 ducks is the highest West Indian on the all-time list.

Rank	Ducks	Player	Matches	Innings	Period
1	24	Chris Gayle	298	291	1999–2019
2	15	Kieron Pollard	123	113	2007–2022
3	14	Phil Simmons	143	138	1987–1999
3	14	Brian Lara	295	285	1990–2007
3	14	Dwayne Smith	105	89	2004–2015
Last updated: 11 February 2022

== Bowling records ==
=== Most career wickets ===
A bowler takes the wicket of a batsman when the form of dismissal is bowled, caught, leg before wicket, stumped or hit wicket. If the batsman is dismissed by run out, obstructing the field, handling the ball, hitting the ball twice or timed out the bowler does not receive credit.

Courtney Walsh, former captain of West Indies national cricket team and widely acknowledged as one of the greatest bowlers of all time, is the highest wicket-taker in ODIs for West Indies.

Rank	Wickets	Player	Matches	Innings	Average	SR	4	5	Period
1	227	Courtney Walsh	205	204	30.47	47.6	6	1	1985–2000
2	225	Curtly Ambrose	176	175	24.12	41.5	6	4	1988–2000
3	199	Dwayne Bravo	164	150	29.51	32.7	6	1	2004–2014
4	193	Carl Hooper	227	203	36.05	49.6	3	0	1987–2003
5	167	Chris Gayle	298	197	35.13	44.1	3	1	1999–2019
6	159	Jason Holder†	138	134	36.96	40.26	5	2	2013–2023
7	157	Malcolm Marshall	136	134	26.96	45.7	6	0	1980–1992
8	146	Joel Garner	98	98	18.84	36.5	2	3	1977–1987
9	142	Michael Holding	102	102	21.36	38.5	5	1	1976–1987
10	133	Alzarri Joesph†	81	79	27.88	30.5	5	1	2016–2025
Last updated: 3 June 2025

=== Fastest wicket taker ===
Wickets	Bowler	Match	Record date	Reference
50	Patrick Patterson	26	20 March 1988	
50	Curtly Ambrose	26	14 October 1989	
100	Curtly Ambrose	61	16 January 1992	
100	Ian Bishop	61	15 December 1995	
150	Curtly Ambrose	103	2 March 1994	
200	Curtly Ambrose	146	6 June 1997	
Last updated: 1 July 2020

==== Most wickets against each team ====
Opposition	Wickets	Player	Matches	Innings	Span	Ref
Afghanistan	8	Jason Holder†	8	7	2017–2019	
Australia	61	Curtly Ambrose	41	40	1988–1999	
Bangladesh	30	Kemar Roach†	19	19	2009–2019	
Bermuda	3	Nikita Miller	1	1	2003–2003	
Canada	5	Vasbert Drakes	1	1	2008–2010	
Canada	5	Nikita Miller	2	2	2008–2010	
England	41	Malcolm Marshall	26	25	1980–1992	
India	44	Courtney Walsh	38	38	1985–1999	
Ireland	15	Alzarri Joseph†	9	8	2020–2025	
Kenya	8	Colin Stuart	3	3	2001–2001	
Nepal	3	Jason Holder†	1	1	2023–2023	
Netherlands	10	Akeal Hosein†	4	4	2022–2023	
New Zealand	22	Chris Gayle	30	19	2002–2019	
Oman	3	Romario Shepherd†	1	1	2023–2023	
Pakistan	69	Curtly Ambrose	44	44	1988–2000	
Papua New Guinea	5	Carlos Brathwaite	1	1	2018–2018	
Scotland	3	Courtney Walsh	1	1	1999–1999	
Scotland	3	Daren Powell	1	1	2007–2007	
South Africa	27	Carl Hooper	24	23	1992–2003	
Sri Lanka	26	Courtney Walsh	22	22	1985–1997	
United Arab Emirates	9	Jason Holder†	2	2	2015–2018	
United States	2	Kyle Mayers†	1	1	2018–2018	
United States	2	Alzarri Joseph†	1	1	2018–2018	
Zimbabwe	28	Dwayne Bravo	16	15	2006–2013	
Last updated: 25 May 2025

=== Best figures in an innings ===
Bowling figures refers to the number of the wickets a bowler has taken and the number of runs conceded. Sri Lanka's Chaminda Vaas holds the world record for best figures in an innings when he took 8/19 against Zimbabwe in December 2001 at Colombo (SSC). Winston Davis holds the West Indian record for best bowling figures.

Rank	Figures	Player	Opposition	Venue	Date
1	7/51	Winston Davis	Australia	Headingley, Leeds, England	11 June 1983 ‡
2	6/15	Colin Croft	England	Arnos Vale Stadium, Kingstown, Saint Vincent & the Grenadines	4 February 1981
3	6/18	Jayden Seales	Pakistan	Brian Lara Cricket Academy, San Fernando, Trinidad and Tobago	12 August 2025
4	6/22	Fidel Edwards	Zimbabwe	Harare Sports Club, Harare, Zimbabwe	29 November 2003
5	6/27	Kemar Roach	Netherlands	Arun Jaitley Stadium, New Delhi, India	28 February 2011 ‡
5	6/27	Sunil Narine	South Africa	Providence Stadium, Providence, Guyana	3 June 2016
Last updated: 1 July 2020

=== Best figures in an innings – progression of record ===
Figures	Player	Opposition	Venue	Date
2/34	Vanburn Holder	England	Headingley, Leeds, England	1973
2/22	Maurice Foster	England	The Oval, London, England	1973
4/20	Bernard Julien	Sri Lanka	Old Trafford, Manchester, England	1975 ‡
5/50	Vanburn Holder	England	Edgbaston, Birmingham, England	1976
5/38	Joel Garner	England	Lord's, London, England	1979 ‡
5/22	Andy Roberts	England	Adelaide Oval, Adelaide, Australia	1979-80
6/15	Colin Croft	England	Arnos Vale Stadium, Kingstown, Saint Vincent & the Grenadines	1980-81
7/51	Winston Davis	Australia	Headingley, Leeds, England	1983 ‡
Last updated: 1 July 2020

=== Best bowling figure against each opponent ===
Opposition	Player	Figures	Date
Afghanistan	Carlos Brathwaite	4/63	4 July 2019 ‡
Australia	Winston Davis	7/51	11 June 1983 ‡
Bangladesh	Mervyn Dillon	5/29	15 September 2004
Bermuda	Nikita Miller	3/19	20 August 2008
Canada	Vasbert Drakes	5/44	23 February 2003 ‡
England	Colin Croft	6/15	4 February 1981
India	Patrick Patterson	6/29	8 December 1987
Ireland	Kemar Roach	4/27	10 March 2018
Kenya	Vasbert Drakes	5/33	4 March 2003 ‡
Nepal	Jason Holder	3/34	22 June 2023 ‡
Netherlands	Kemar Roach	6/27	28 February 2011 ‡
New Zealand	Sunil Narine	5/27	16 July 2012
Oman	Romario Shepherd	3/44	5 July 2023
Pakistan	Franklyn Rose	5/23	12 April 2000
Papua New Guinea	Carlos Brathwaite	5/27	8 March 2018
Scotland	Courtney Walsh	3/7	27 May 1999 ‡
South Africa	Sunil Narine	6/27	3 June 2016
Sri Lanka	Courtney Walsh	5/1	3 December 1986
United Arab Emirates	Jason Holder	5/53	6 March 2018
United States	Kyle Mayers	2/30	18 June 2023 ‡
Zimbabwe	Fidel Edwards	6/22	29 November 2003
Last updated: 22 June 2023.

=== Best career average ===
A bowler's bowling average is the total number of runs they have conceded divided by the number of wickets they have taken. Afghanistan's Rashid Khan holds the record for the best career average in ODIs with 18.54. Joel Garner, West Indian cricketer, and a member of the highly regarded late 1970s and early 1980s West Indies cricket teams, is second behind Rashid with an overall career average of 18.84 runs per wicket.

Rank	Average	Player	Wickets	Runs	Balls	Period
1	18.85	Joel Garner	146	2,752	5,330	1977-1987
2	20.36	Andy Roberts	87	1,771	3,123	1975-1983
3	21.37	Michael Holding	142	3,034	5,473	1976-1987
4	23.78	Reon King	76	1,807	2,603	1998-2005
5	24.13	Curtly Ambrose	225	5,429	9,353	1988-2000
Qualification: 2,000 balls. Last updated: 1 July 2020

=== Best career economy rate ===
A bowler's economy rate is the total number of runs they have conceded divided by the number of overs they have bowled. West Indies' Joel Garner, holds the ODI record for the best career economy rate with 3.09.

Rank	Economy rate	Player	Wickets	Runs	Balls	Period
1	3.10	Joel Garner	146	2,752	5,330	1977-1987
2	3.33	Michael Holding	142	3,034	5,473	1976-1987
3	3.40	Andy Roberts	87	1,771	3,123	1975-1983
4	3.48	Curtly Ambrose	225	5,429	9,353	1988-2000
5	3.54	Malcolm Marshall	157	4,233	7,175	1980-1992
Qualification: 2,000 balls. Last updated: 1 July 2020

=== Best career strike rate ===
A bowler's strike rate is the total number of balls they have bowled divided by the number of wickets they have taken. The top bowler with the best ODI career strike rate is South Africa's Lungi Ngidi with strike rate of 23.2 balls per wicket. Andre Russell not only has the best batting strike rate among West Indians, he is the West Indian bowler as well with a strike rate of 32.7 balls per wicket.

Rank	Strike rate	Player	Wickets	Runs	Balls	Period
1	30.47	Alzarri Joseph†	133	3,709	4,053	2016–2025
2	32.71	Andre Russell	70	2,229	2,290	2011–2019
2	32.71	Dwayne Bravo	199	5,874	6,511	2004–2014
4	33.88	Patrick Patterson	90	2,206	3,050	1986–1993
5	33.91	Jerome Taylor	128	3,780	4,341	2003–2017
Qualification: 2,000 balls. Last updated: 3 June 2025

=== Most four-wickets (& over) hauls in an innings ===
Waqar Younis has taken the most four-wickets (or over) among all the bowlers.

Rank	Four-wicket hauls	Player	Matches	Balls	Wickets	Period
1	10	Curtly Ambrose	176	9,353	225	1988-2000
1	10	Ravi Rampaul	92	4,033	117	2003-2015
3	9	Ian Bishop	84	4,332	118	1988-1997
4	7	Courtney Walsh	205	10,822	227	1985-2000
4	7	Dwayne Bravo	164	6,511	199	2004-2014
4	7	Jason Holder†	133	6,127	153	2013-2023
Last updated: 21 March 2023

=== Most five-wicket hauls in a match ===
A five-wicket haul refers to a bowler taking five wickets in a single innings. Waqar Younis with 13 such hauls has the most hauls among all the bowlers.

Rank	Five-wicket hauls	Player	Matches	Balls	Wickets	Period
1	4	Curtly Ambrose	176	9,353	225	1988-2000
2	3	Joel Garner	98	5,330	146	1977-1987
2	3	Mervyn Dillon	108	5,480	130	1997-2005
2	3	Kemar Roach†	95	4,579	125	2008-2022
5	2	Viv Richards	187	5,644	118	1975-1991
5	2	Ian Bishop	84	4,332	118	1988-1997
5	2	Ottis Gibson	15	739	34	1995-1997
5	2	Vasbert Drakes	34	1,640	51	1995-2004
5	2	Fidel Edwards	50	2,138	60	2003-2009
5	2	Ravi Rampaul	92	4,033	117	2003-2015
5	2	Sunil Narine	65	3,540	92	2011-2016
5	2	Jason Holder†	133	6,127	153	2013-2023
Last updated: 21 March 2023

=== Best economy rates in an inning ===
The best economy rate in an inning, when a minimum of 30 balls are delivered by the player, is West Indies player Phil Simmons economy of 0.30 during his spell of 3 runs for 4 wickets in 10 overs against Pakistan at Sydney Cricket Ground in the 1992-93 Australian Tri-Series.

Rank	Economy	Player	Overs	Runs	Wickets	Opposition	Venue	Date
1	0.30	Phil Simmons	10	3	4	Pakistan	Sydney Cricket Ground, Sydney, Australia	17 December 1992
2	0.50	Curtly Ambrose	10	5	1	Sri Lanka	Sharjah Cricket Stadium, Sharjah, United Arab Emirates	13 October 1999
3	0.80	Curtly Ambrose	5	4	0	Sri Lanka	Paikiasothy Saravanamuttu Stadium, Colombo, Sri Lanka	1 December 1993
3	0.80	Curtly Ambrose	10	8	2	Scotland	Grace Road, Leicester, England	27 May 1999
5	0.83	Malcolm Marshall	6	5	1	Pakistan	Sydney Cricket Ground, Sydney, Australia	19 January 1984
Qualification: 30 balls bowled. Last updated: 1 July 2020

=== Best strike rates in an inning ===
The best strike rate in an inning, when a minimum of 4 wickets are taken by the player, is shared by Sunil Dhaniram of Canada, Paul Collingwood of England and Virender Sehwag of India when they achieved a strike rate of 4.2 balls per wicket. Mudassar Nazar during his spell of 5/1 achieved the best strike rate for a West Indian bowler.

Rank	Strike rate	Player	Wickets	Runs	Balls	Opposition	Venue	Date
1	5.4	Courtney Walsh	5	1	27	Sri Lanka	Sharjah Cricket Stadium, Sharjah, United Arab Emirates	3 December 1986
2	6.2	Oshane Thomas	5	21	31	England	Darren Sammy National Cricket Stadium, Gros Islet, Saint Lucia	2 March 2019
3	6.5	Chris Gayle	4	19	26	Pakistan	Sharjah Cricket Stadium, Sharjah, United Arab Emirates	17 February 2002
4	7	Fidel Edwards	6	22	42	Zimbabwe	Harare Sports Club, Harare, Zimbabwe	29 November 2003
5	7.25	Phil Simmons	4	18	29	Australia	Queen's Park Oval, Port of Spain, Trinidad & Tobago	12 March 1995
Last updated: 1 July 2020

=== Worst figures in an innings ===
The worst figures in an ODI came in the 5th One Day International between South Africa at home to Australia in 2006. Australia's Mick Lewis returned figures of 0/113 from his 10 overs in the second innings of the match. The worst figures by a West Indian is 0/91 that came off the bowling of Jason Holder in the 2015 ODI Series against South Africa at New Wanderers Stadium, Johannesburg, South Africa.

Rank	Figures	Player	Overs	Opposition	Venue	Date
1	0/91	Jason Holder	9	South Africa	New Wanderers Stadium, Johannesburg, South Africa	18 January 2015
2	0/88	Jason Holder	7	England	National Cricket Stadium, St. George's, Grenada	27 February 2019
2	0/88	Keon Harding	10	Bangladesh	Zahur Ahmed Chowdhury Stadium, Chittagong, Bangladesh	25 January 2021
4	0/80	Dwayne Bravo	10	England	Lord's, London, England	6 July 2004
5	0/79	Sulieman Benn	10	South Africa	Sydney Cricket Ground, Sydney, Australia	27 February 2015 ‡
Last updated: 10 March 2021

=== Most runs conceded in a match ===
Mick Lewis also holds the dubious distinction of most runs conceded in an ODI during the aforementioned match. Jason Holder holds the most runs conceded distinction for West Indies.

Rank	Figures	Player	Overs	Opposition	Venue	Date
1	1/104	Jason Holder	10	South Africa	Sydney Cricket Ground, Sydney, Australia	27 February 2015 ‡
2	2/96	Andre Russell	10	New Zealand	Westpac Stadium, Wellington, New Zealand	21 March 2015 ‡
3	1/95	Jerome Taylor	10	South Africa	New Wanderers Stadium, Johannesburg, South Africa	18 January 2015
4	0/91	Jason Holder	9	South Africa	New Wanderers Stadium, Johannesburg, South Africa	18 January 2015
5	0/88	Jason Holder	7	England	National Cricket Stadium, St. George's, Grenada	27 February 2019
5	1/88	Kemar Roach	10	India	Holkar Cricket Stadium, Indore, India	8 December 2011
5	1/88	Keemo Paul	10	India	Brabourne Stadium, Mumbai, India	29 October 2018
5	0/88	Keon Harding	10	Bangladesh	Zahur Ahmed Chowdhury Stadium, Chittagong, Bangladesh	25 January 2021
Last updated:1 July 2020

=== Most wickets in a calendar year ===
West Indies's Saqlain Mushtaq holds the record for most wickets taken in a year when he took 69 wickets in 1997 in 36 ODIs.

Rank	Wickets	Player	Matches	Year
1	39	Jerome Taylor	24	2006
2	38	Mervyn Dillon	24	1999
2	38	Daren Powell	23	2007
4	37	Reon King	24	1999
5	36	Ian Bradshaw	26	2006
Last updated: 1 July 2020

=== Most wickets in a series ===
1998–99 Carlton and United Series involving Australia, England and Sri Lanka and the 2019 Cricket World Cup saw the records set for the most wickets taken by a bowler in an ODI series when Australian pacemen Glenn McGrath and Mitchell Starc achieved a total of 27 wickets during the series, respectively. Joel Garner in the 1981-82 Benson & Hedges World Series took 23 wickets, the most for a West Indian bowler in a series.

Rank	Wickets	Player	Matches	Series
1	24	Joel Garner	14	1981-82 Benson & Hedges World Series
2	23	Michael Holding	12	1983-84 Benson & Hedges World Series
3	21	Curtly Ambrose	10	1988-89 Benson & Hedges World Series
4	19	Andy Roberts	9	1979-80 Benson & Hedges World Series
4	19	Michael Holding	13	1981-82 Benson & Hedges World Series
Last updated: 1 July 2020

=== Hat-trick ===
In cricket, a hat-trick occurs when a bowler takes three wickets with consecutive deliveries. The deliveries may be interrupted by an over bowled by another bowler from the other end of the pitch or the other team's innings, but must be three consecutive deliveries by the individual bowler in the same match. Only wickets attributed to the bowler count towards a hat-trick; run outs do not count. In ODIs history there have been just 49 hat-tricks, the first achieved by Jalal-ud-Din for West Indies against Australia in 1982.

No.	Bowler	Against	Dismissals	Venue	Date	Ref.
1	Jerome Taylor	Australia	• Michael Hussey (b) • Brett Lee (lbw) • Brad Hogg (b)	(India) Brabourne Stadium, Mumbai	18 October 2006	
2	Kemar Roach	Netherlands	• Pieter Seelaar (lbw) • Bernard Loots (lbw) • Berend Westdijk (b)	(India) Feroz Shah Kotla, New Delhi	28 February 2011 ‡	

== Wicket-keeping records ==
The wicket-keeper is a specialist fielder who stands behind the stumps being guarded by the batsman on strike and is the only member of the fielding side allowed to wear gloves and leg pads.

=== Most career dismissals ===
A wicket-keeper can be credited with the dismissal of a batsman in two ways, caught or stumped. A fair catch is taken when the ball is caught fully within the field of play without it bouncing after the ball has touched the striker's bat or glove holding the bat, Laws 5.6.2.2 and 5.6.2.3 state that the hand or the glove holding the bat shall be regarded as the ball striking or touching the bat while a stumping occurs when the wicket-keeper puts down the wicket while the batsman is out of his ground and not attempting a run. West Indies's Jeff Dujon is 11th in taking most dismissals in ODIs as a designated wicket-keeper with Sri Lanka's Kumar Sangakkara and Australian Adam Gilchrist heading the list.

Rank	Dismissals	Player	Matches	Innings	Catches	Stumping	Dis/Inn	Period
1	204	Jeff Dujon	169	166	183	21	1.228	1981–1991
2	189	Ridley Jacobs	147	145	160	29	1.303	1996–2004
3	188	Denesh Ramdin	139	137	181	7	1.372	2005–2016
4	163	Shai Hope†	145	140	148	15	1.181	2016–2025
5	68	Courtney Browne	46	46	59	9	1.478	1995–2005
Last updated: 18 October 2025

=== Most career catches ===
Dujon is eight in taking most catches in ODIs as a designated wicket-keeper.

Rank	Catches	Player	Matches	Innings	Period
1	183	Jeff Dujon	169	166	1981–1991
2	181	Denesh Ramdin	139	137	2005–2016
3	160	Ridley Jacobs	147	145	1996–2004
4	148	Shai Hope†	145	140	2016–2025
5	59	Courtney Browne	46	46	1995–2005
Last updated: 18 October 2025

=== Most career stumpings ===
Ridley Jacobs is joint-15th in making stumpings in ODIs as a designated wicket-keeper.

Rank	Stumpings	Player	Matches	Innings	Period
1	29	Ridley Jacobs	147	145	1996–2004
2	21	Jeff Dujon	169	166	1981–1991
3	15	Shai Hope†	145	140	2016–2025
4	12	Carlton Baugh	47	46	2003–2012
5	10	David Williams	36	35	1988–1997
Last updated: 12 August 2025

=== Most dismissals in an innings ===
Ten wicket-keepers on 15 occasions have taken six dismissals in a single innings in an ODI. Adam Gilchrist of Australia alone has done it six times. Ridley Jacobs is the only West Indian wicket keeper to have achieved this.

The feat of taking 5 dismissals in an innings has been achieved by 49 wicket-keepers on 87 occasions including 5 West Indians on 11 occasions.

Rank	Dismissals	Player	Opposition	Venue	Date
1	6	Ridley Jacobs	Sri Lanka	Ranasinghe Premadasa Stadium, Colombo, Sri Lanka	11 December 2001
2	5	Courtney Browne	Sri Lanka	Brisbane Cricket Ground, Brisbane, Australia	28 June 2009
2	5	Jimmy Adams	Kenya	Nehru Stadium, Pune, India	29 February 1996 ‡
2	5	Ridley Jacobs	England	Arnos Vale Stadium, Kingstown, Saint Vincent & the Grenadines	5 April 1998
2	5	Ridley Jacobs	New Zealand	County Ground, Southampton, England	24 May 1999 ‡
2	5	Ridley Jacobs	Bangladesh	Bangabandhu National Stadium, Dhaka, Bangladesh	9 October 1999
2	5	Ridley Jacobs	Zimbabwe	Sydney Cricket Ground, Sydney, Australia	23 January 2001
2	5	Denesh Ramdin	Pakistan	Iqbal Stadium, Faisalabad, Pakistan	7 December 2006
2	5	Denesh Ramdin	Netherlands	Clontarf Cricket Club Ground, Dublin, Ireland	10 July 2007
2	5	Denesh Ramdin	Zimbabwe	Harare Sports Club, Harare, Zimbabwe	2 December 2007
2	5	Denesh Ramdin	India	Sabina Park, Kingston, Jamaica	28 June 2009
2	5	Shai Hope†	Ireland	Kensington Oval, Bridgetown, Barbados	
Last updated: 1 July 2020

=== Most dismissals in a series ===
Gilchrist also holds the ODIs record for the most dismissals taken by a wicket-keeper in a series. He made 27 dismissals during the 1998-99 Carlton & United Series. West Indian record is held by Moin Khan when he made 19 dismissals during the 1999-00 Carlton & United Series.

Rank	Dismissals	Player	Matches	Innings	Series
1	23	Jeff Dujon	13	13	1984-85 Benson & Hedges World Series
2	19	Courtney Browne	8	8	1995-96 Benson & Hedges World Series
3	17	Jeff Dujon	13	13	1983-84 Benson & Hedges World Series
4	16	Jeff Dujon	8	8	1983 Cricket World Cup
4	16	Ridley Jacobs	7	7	2000 Cable & Wireless ODI Series
4	16	Shai Hope†	9	9	2019 Cricket World Cup
Last updated: 1 July 2020

== Fielding records ==
=== Most career catches ===
Caught is one of the nine methods a batsman can be dismissed in cricket. (Note: In 2017, The Laws of Cricket were amended, reducing the methods of dismissals from ten to nine, with handled the ball now covered as part of obstructing the field.) The majority of catches are caught in the slips, located behind the batsman, next to the wicket-keeper, on the off side of the field. Most slip fielders are top order batsmen.

Sri Lanka's Mahela Jayawardene holds the record for the most catches in ODIs by a non-wicket-keeper with 218, followed by Ricky Ponting of Australia on 160 and Indian Mohammad Azharuddin with 156. Chris Gayle is the leading catcher for West Indies.

Rank	Catches	Player	Matches	Innings	Ct/Inn	Period
1	123	Chris Gayle	298	291	0.422	1999-2019
2	120	Carl Hooper	227	225	0.533	1987-2003
3	117	Brian Lara	295	292	0.400	1990-2007
4	100	Viv Richards	187	186	0.537	1975-1991
5	75	Richie Richardson	224	222	0.337	1983-1996
Last updated: 1 July 2020

=== Most catches in an innings ===
South Africa's Jonty Rhodes is the only fielder to have taken five catches in an innings.

The feat of taking 4 catches in an innings has been achieved by 42 fielders on 44 occasions including four West Indian fielders on four occasions.

Rank	Dismissals	Player	Opposition	Venue	Date
1	4	Richie Richardson	England	Edgbaston, Birmingham, England	23 May 1991
1	4	Carl Hooper	Pakistan	Sahara Stadium, Kingsmead, Durban, South Africa	19 February 1993
1	4	Phil Simmons	Sri Lanka	Sharjah Cricket Stadium, Sharjah, United Arab Emirates	11 October 1995
1	4	Kieron Pollard†	Australia	Manuka Oval, Canberra, Australia	6 February 2013
Last updated: 1 July 2020

=== Most catches in a series ===
The 2019 Cricket World Cup, which was won by England for the first time, saw the record set for the most catches taken by a non-wicket-keeper in an ODI series. Englishman batsman and captain of the England Test team Joe Root took 13 catches in the series as well as scored 556 runs. Carl Hooper with 11 catches in the 1992-93 Total International Series in South Africa is the leading West Indian on this list.

Rank	Catches	Player	Matches	Innings	Series
1	11	Carl Hooper	7	7	1992-93 Total International Series
2	10	Viv Richards	7	7	MRF World Series in 1989
3	9	Clive Lloyd	8	8	1979-80 Benson & Hedges World Series
3	9	Viv Richards	13	13	1984-85 Benson & Hedges World Series
3	9	Kieron Pollard	5	5	West Indies in Bangladesh in 2012-13
Last updated: 1 July 2020

== All-round records ==
=== 1000 runs and 100 wickets ===
A total of 64 players have achieved the double of 1000 runs and 100 wickets in their ODI career.

Rank	Player	Average difference	Period	Matches	Runs	Bat avg.	Wickets	Bowl avg.
1	Viv Richards	11.16	1975-1991	187	6721	47	118	35.83
2	Chris Gayle	2.9	1999-2019	298	10425	38.04	167	35.13
3	Carl Hooper	-0.7	1987-2003	227	5761	35.34	193	36.05
4	Dwayne Bravo	-4.15	2004-2014	164	2968	25.36	199	29.51
5	Jason Holder†	-12.44	2013-2022	127	2019	24.62	146	37.06
Last updated: 11 February 2022

=== 250 runs and 5 wickets in a series ===
A total of 50 players on 103 occasions have achieved the double of 250 runs and 5 wickets in a series.

Player	Matches	Runs	Wickets	Series
Viv Richards	14	536	11	1981-82 Benson & Hedges World Series
Larry Gomes	8	258	9	1983 Cricket World Cup
Viv Richards	12	348	9	1983-84 Benson & Hedges World Series
Viv Richards	13	651	13	1984-85 Benson & Hedges World Series
Viv Richards	8	266	5	1986-87 Benson & Hedges World Series
Carl Hooper	7	250	5	West Indies in India in 1987
Viv Richards	11	277	5	1988-89 Benson & Hedges World Series
Carl Hooper	5	290	6	Australia in the West Indies in 1995
Carl Hooper	7	256	9	West Indies in South Africa in 1999
Marlon Samuels	10	282	14	2000-01 Carlton Series
Chris Gayle	7	275	11	Australia in the West Indies in 2003
Chris Gayle	5	385	7	West Indies in Zimbabwe in 2003
Chris Gayle	8	474	8	2006 ICC Champions Trophy
Chris Gayle	6	340	5	2015 Cricket World Cup
Last updated: 1 July 2020

== Other records ==
=== Most career matches ===
India's Sachin Tendulkar holds the record for the most ODI matches played with 463, with former captains Mahela Jayawardene and Sanath Jayasuriya being second and third having represented Sri Lanka on 443 and 441 occasions, respectively. Gayle is the most experienced West Indies players having represented the team on 298 occasions.

Rank	Matches	Player	Runs	Wkts	Period
1	298	Chris Gayle	10,425	167	1999-2019
2	295	Brian Lara	10,348	4	1990-2007
3	268	Shivnarine Chanderpaul	8,778	14	1994-2011
4	238	Desmond Haynes	8,648	0	1978-1991
5	227	Carl Hooper	5,761	193	1987-2003
Last updated: 1 July 2020

=== Most consecutive career matches ===
Tendulkar also holds the record for the most consecutive ODI matches played with 185. He broke Richie Richardson's long standing record of 132 matches.

Rank	Matches	Player	Period
1	132	Richie Richardson	1987-1993
2	78	Shai Hope	2016-2020
3	74	Viv Richards	1984-1988
4	73	Desmond Haynes	1979-1985
5	70	Chris Gayle	2001-2004
Last updated: 3 June 2018

=== Most matches as captain ===
Ricky Ponting, who led the Australian cricket team from 2002 to 2012, holds the record for the most matches played as captain in ODIs with 230 (including 1 as captain of ICC World XI team). Brian Lara has led West Indies in 125 matches, the most for any player from his country.

Rank	Matches	Player	Won	Lost	Tied	NR	Win %	Period
1	125	Brian Lara	59	59	0	7	50.00	1994-2007
2	105	Viv Richards	67	36	0	2	65.05	1980-1991
3	87	Richie Richardson	46	36	3	2	55.88	1991-1996
4	86	Jason Holder	24	54	2	6	31.25	2015-2019
5	84	Clive Lloyd	64	18	1	1	77.71	1975-1985
Last updated: 1 July 2020

=== Most matches won as a captain ===
Rank	Won	Player	Matches	Lost	Tied	NR	Win %	Period
1	67	Viv Richards	105	36	0	2	65.05	1980-1991
2	64	Clive Lloyd	84	18	1	1	77.71	1975-1985
3	59	Brian Lara	125	59	0	7	50.00	1994-2007
4	46	Richie Richardson	87	36	3	2	55.88	1991-1996
5	24	Jason Holder	86	54	2	6	31.25	2015-2019
Last updated: 1 July 2020

==== Most man of the match awards ====
Rank	M.O.M. Awards	Player	Matches	Period
1	31	Viv Richards	187	1975–1991
2	30	Brian Lara	295	1990–2007
3	25	Desmond Haynes	238	1978–1994
4	23	Chris Gayle	298	1999–2019
5	20	Gordon Greenidge	128	1975–1991
Last updated: 22 September 2024

==== Most man of the series awards ====
Rank	M.O.S. Awards	Player	Matches	Period
1	8	Chris Gayle	298	1999–2019
2	5	Shai Hope†	130	2016–2024
3	4	Viv Richards	187	1975–1991
3	4	Brian Lara	295	1990–2007
5	3	Shivnarine Chanderpaul	268	1994–2011
Last updated: 22 September 2024

=== Youngest players on debut ===
The youngest player to play in an ODI match is claimed to be Hasan Raza at the age of 14 years and 233 days. Making his debut for Sri Lanka against Zimbabwe on 30 October 1996, there is some doubt as to the validity of Raza's age at the time.

Rank	Age	Player	Opposition	Venue	Date
1	17 years and 324 days	Jewel Andrew	Sri Lanka	Pallekele International Cricket Stadium, Pallekele Sri Lanka	26 October 2024
2	18 years and 293 days	Xavier Marshall	Australia	Melbourne Cricket Ground, Melbourne, Australia	14 January 2005
3	18 years and 354 days	Jerome Taylor	Sri Lanka	Arnos Vale Stadium, Kingstown, Saint Vincent & the Grenadines	11 June 2003
4	19 years and 38 days	Ravi Rampaul	Zimbabwe	Queens Sports Club, Bulawayo, Zimbabwe	22 November 2003
5	19 years and 147 days	Keiron Powell	Bangladesh	Warner Park, Basseterre, Saint Kitts & Nevis	31 July 2009
Last updated: 18 March 2025

=== Oldest players on Debut ===
The Netherlands batsmen Nolan Clarke is the oldest debutant to appear in an ODI match. Playing in the 1996 Cricket World Cup against New Zealand in 1996 at Reliance Stadium in Vadodara, India he was aged 47 years and 240 days. Lance Gibbs was 38 years and 341days when he played West Indies inaugural ODI in 1973 at the | Headingley, Leeds, England.

Rank	Age	Player	Opposition	Venue	Date
1	38 years and 341 days	Lance Gibbs	England	Headingley, Leeds, England	5 September 1973
2	37 years and 253 days	Rohan Kanhai	England	Headingley, Leeds, England	5 September 1973
3	37 years and 39 days	Gary Sobers	England	Headingley, Leeds, England	5 September 1973
4	34 years and 50 days	Ron Headley	England	The Oval, London, England	7 September 1973
5	33 years and 310 days	Irvine Shillingford	Australia	Antigua Recreation Ground, St. John's, Antigua & Barbuda	22 February 1978
Last updated: 1 July 2020

=== Oldest players ===
The Netherlands batsmen Nolan Clarke is the oldest player to appear in an ODI match. Playing in the 1996 Cricket World Cup against South Africa in 1996 at Rawalpindi Cricket Stadium in Rawalpindi, Pakistan he was aged 47 years and 257 days.

Rank	Age	Player	Opposition	Venue	Date
1	40 years and 251 days	Lance Gibbs	Sri Lanka	Old Trafford, Manchester, England	7 June 1975 ‡
2	40 years and 187 days	Clive Lloyd	Pakistan	Melbourne Cricket Ground, Melbourne, Australia	6 March 1985
3	40 years and 24 days	Gordon Greenidge	England	Old Trafford, Manchester, England	25 May 1991
4	39 years and 327 days	Chris Gayle	India	Queen's Sports Club, Port of Spain, Trinidad & Tobago	14 August 2019
5	39 years and 177 days	Rohan Kanhai	Australia	Lord's, London, England	21 June 1975
Last updated: 1 July 2020

== Partnership records ==
In cricket, two batsmen are always present at the crease batting together in a partnership. This partnership will continue until one of them is dismissed, retires or the innings comes to a close.

=== Highest partnerships by wicket ===
A wicket partnership describes the number of runs scored before each wicket falls. The first wicket partnership is between the opening batsmen and continues until the first wicket falls. The second wicket partnership then commences between the not out batsman and the number three batsman. This partnership continues until the second wicket falls. The third wicket partnership then commences between the not out batsman and the new batsman. This continues down to the tenth wicket partnership. When the tenth wicket has fallen, there is no batsman left to partner so the innings is closed.

Wicket	Runs	First batsman	Second batsman	Opposition	Venue	Date	Scorecard
1st Wicket	365 ♠	John Campbell†	Shai Hope†	Ireland	Clontarf Cricket Club Ground, Dublin, Ireland	5 May 2019	Scorecard
2nd Wicket	372 ♠	Chris Gayle	Marlon Samuels	Zimbabwe	Manuka Oval, Canberra, Australia	24 February 2015 ‡	Scorecard
3rd Wicket	258 ♠	Darren Bravo†	Denesh Ramdin	Bangladesh	Warner Park, Basseterre, Saint Kitts & Nevis	25 August 2014	Scorecard
4th Wicket	226	Carl Hooper	Shivnarine Chanderpaul	South Africa	Buffalo Park, East London, South Africa	24 January 1999	Scorecard
5th Wicket	168*	Evin Lewis†	Jason Holder†	England	The Oval, London, England	27 September 2017	Scorecard
6th Wicket	154	Jeff Dujon	Richie Richardson	Pakistan	Sharjah Cricket Stadium, Sharjah, United Arab Emirates	21 October 1991	Scorecard
6th Wicket	154	Darren Sammy	Lendl Simmons	Ireland	Saxton Oval, Nelson, New Zealand	16 February 2015 ‡	Scorecard
7th Wicket	115	Jeff Dujon	Malcolm Marshall	Pakistan	Jinnah Stadium, Gujranwala, Pakistan	4 November 1986	Scorecard
8th Wicket	101	Andre Russell†	Darren Sammy	Australia	Darren Sammy National Cricket Stadium, Gros Islet, Saint Lucia	25 March 2012	Scorecard
9th Wicket	119	Sherfane Rutherford	Gudakesh Motie	Sri Lanka	Pallekele International Cricket Stadium, Pallekele, Sri Lanka	23 October 2024	Scorecard
10th Wicket	106*	Michael Holding	Viv Richards	England	Old Trafford, Manchester, England	31 May 1984	Scorecard
Last updated: 23 October 2024

=== Highest partnerships by runs ===
The highest ODI partnership by runs for any wicket is held by the West Indian pairing of Chris Gayle and Marlon Samuels who put together a second wicket partnership of 372 runs during the 2015 Cricket World Cup against Zimbabwe in February 2015. This broke the record of 331 runs set by the Indian pair of Sachin Tendulkar and Rahul Dravid against New Zealand in 1999.

Wicket	Runs	First batsman	Second batsman	Opposition	Venue	Date	Scorecard
2nd Wicket	372 ♠	Chris Gayle	Marlon Samuels	Zimbabwe	Manuka Oval, Canberra, Australia	24 February 2015 ‡	Scorecard
1st Wicket	365	John Campbell†	Shai Hope†	Ireland	Clontarf Cricket Club Ground, Dublin, Ireland	5 May 2019	Scorecard
3rd Wicket	258	Darren Bravo†	Denesh Ramdin	Bangladesh	Warner Park, Basseterre, Saint Kitts & Nevis	25 August 2014	Scorecard
4th Wicket	226	Carl Hooper	Shivnarine Chanderpaul	South Africa	Buffalo Park, East London, South Africa	24 January 1999	Scorecard
2nd Wicket	221	Gordon Greenidge	Viv Richards	India	Keenan Stadium, Jamshedpur, India	7 December 1983	Scorecard
Last updated: 1 July 2020

=== Highest overall partnership runs by a pair ===
Rank	Runs	Innings	Players	Highest	Average	100/50	T20I career span
1	5,206	103	Gordon Greenidge & Desmond Haynes	192*	52.58	15/25	1979-1991
2	3,908	103	Desmond Haynes & Richie Richardson	167	40.28	9/21	1984-1994
3	2,824	64	Shivnarine Chanderpaul & Chris Gayle	193	46.29	6/17	1999-2010
4	2,498	49	Shivnarine Chanderpaul & Ramnaresh Sarwan	149	54.3	6/18	2001–2011
5	2,409	51	Desmond Haynes & Viv Richards	205	51.25	7/10	1978-1991
An asterisk (*) signifies an unbroken partnership (i.e. neither of the batsmen was dismissed before either the end of the allotted overs or the required score being reached). Last updated: 11 October 2022

== Umpiring records ==
=== Most matches umpired ===
An umpire in cricket is a person who officiates the match according to the Laws of Cricket. Two umpires adjudicate the match on the field, whilst a third umpire has access to video replays, and a fourth umpire looks after the match balls and other duties. The records below are only for on-field umpires.

Rudi Koertzen of South Africa holds the record for the most ODI matches umpired, with 209. The current active Aleem Dar is currently at 208 matches. They are followed by New Zealand's Billy Bowden who officiated in 200 matches. Steve Bucknor is the most experienced West Indian umpire ioth 181 matches officiated.

Rank	Matches	Umpire	Period
1	181	Steve Bucknor	1989-2009
2	112	Billy Doctrove	1998-2012
3	75	Joel Wilson	2011-2021
4	47	Gregory Brathwaite	2011-2021
5	46	Eddie Nicholls	1995-2005
Last updated: 16 January 2022

== See also ==
- List of One Day International cricket records
- List of One Day International cricket hat-tricks
- List of Test cricket records
- List of List A cricket records
- List of Cricket World Cup records
