= South African cricket team in the West Indies in 1992 =

International cricket tour

	South Africa	West Indies
- Dates: 7 April – 23 April 1992
Captains	Kepler Wessels	Richie Richardson

Test series
- Result: West Indies won the 1-match series 1–0
Most runs	Andrew Hudson (163)	Jimmy Adams (90)
Most wickets	Richard Snell (8)	Curtly Ambrose (8)
- Player of the series: Curtly Ambrose (WI); Andrew Hudson (RSA)

One Day International series
- Results: West Indies won the 3-match series 3–0
Most runs	Hansie Cronje (87)	Phil Simmons (226)
Most wickets	Adrian Kuiper (4)	Winston Benjamin (5); Anderson Cummins (5)

The South Africa national cricket team toured the West Indies in April 1992. The tour marked the first-ever official Test and One Day International matches between the two teams. It was also South Africa's first Test match since their reintroduction to the sport after being suspended in 1970 due to the apartheid regime, and their first Test against a non-white team.

The tour consisted of three One-day Internationals and one Test match against the West Indies. All four matches were won by the West Indies.

== Squads ==
South Africa	West Indies
Kepler Wessels (c); Tertius Bosch; Hansie Cronje; Allan Donald; Omar Henry (ODI only); Andrew Hudson; Peter Kirsten; Adrian Kuiper; Meyrick Pringle; Jonty Rhodes (ODI only); Dave Richardson (wk); Mark Rushmere; Richard Snell; Corrie van Zyl (ODI only)	Richie Richardson (c); Jimmy Adams; Curtly Ambrose; Keith Arthurton; Kenny Benjamin (Test only); Winston Benjamin (ODI only); Anderson Cummins (ODI only); Roger Harper (ODI only); Desmond Haynes; Carl Hooper (ODI only); Brian Lara; Patrick Patterson; Phil Simmons; Courtney Walsh (Test only); David Williams (wk)

== Match details ==
=== 1st ODI: West Indies v South Africa at Kingston, 7 April 1992 ===
7 April 1992
(scorecard)

West Indies; 287/6 (50 overs)	v	South Africa; 180 (42.2 overs)
Phil Simmons 122 (113); Adrian Kuiper 3/33 (5 overs)		Andrew Hudson 50 (70); Winston Benjamin 3/45 (9.2 overs)

West Indies won by 107 runs
Sabina Park, Kingston, Jamaica
Umpires: Steve Bucknor and Glenroy Johnson
Player of the match: Phil Simmons

- South Africa won the toss and elected to field

=== 2nd ODI: West Indies v South Africa at Port-of-Spain, 11 April 1992 ===
11 April 1992
(scorecard)

South Africa; 152 (43.4 overs)	v	West Indies; 154/0 (25.5 overs)
Jonty Rhodes 45 (71); Curtly Ambrose 3/24 (7.4 overs)		Brian Lara 86 (91)

West Indies won by 10 wickets
Queen's Park Oval, Port-of-Spain, Trinidad
Umpires: Lloyd Barker and Clyde Cumberbatch
Player of the match: Brian Lara

- West Indies won the toss and elected to field

=== 3rd ODI: West Indies v South Africa at Port-of-Spain, 12 April 1992 ===
12 April 1992
(scorecard)

South Africa; 189/6 (50 overs)	v	West Indies; 190/3 (43 overs)
Kepler Wessels 45 (77); Roger Harper 2/31 (10 overs)		Phil Simmons 104 (139); Meyrick Pringle 1/6 (5 overs)

West Indies won by 7 wickets
Queen's Park Oval, Port-of-Spain, Trinidad
Umpires: Lloyd Barker and Clyde Cumberbatch
Player of the match: Phil Simmons

- West Indies won the toss and elected to field

=== Test Match ===
18 April - 23 April
(scorecard)

West Indies	v	South Africa
262 (71.4 overs); Keith Arthurton 59; Richard Snell 4/83		345 (135.5 overs); Andrew Hudson 163; Jimmy Adams 4/43
283 (81.3 overs); Jimmy Adams 79*; Richard Snell 4/74		148 (72.4 overs); Kepler Wessels 74; Curtly Ambrose 6/34

West Indies won by 52 runs
Kensington Oval, Bridgetown, Barbados
Umpires: David Archer and Steve Bucknor
Player of the match: Curtly Ambrose and Andrew Hudson

- South Africa won the toss and elected to field

The Test match was South Africa's first since their return to international cricket, and so 10 players were making their Test match debuts (Kepler Wessels had previously played for Australia). For the West Indies, 3 players made their debuts — Jimmy Adams, David Williams and Kenny Benjamin. The selection of Benjamin in particular had been a contentious issue. The Barbados crowd had expected Anderson Cummins, a Barbadian and a local favourite, to make his debut in this match in front of his home fans. However, the West Indian selectors opted for Benjamin instead. As a result, many fans chose to boycott the match in protest.

South Africa won the toss and chose to bowl first. The West Indies had reached 219/3, but collapsed to 262 all out. Notable contributions came from Keith Arthurton (59), Desmond Haynes (58) and Richie Richardson (44), and Richard Snell picked up 4 wickets for South Africa.

South Africa batted throughout the whole of the second day and into the third, racking up a score of 345 all out. A century from Andrew Hudson (163) formed the backbone of the innings with some support from Kepler Wessels (59). Debutant Jimmy Adams used his part-time spin bowling to pick up 4 wickets.

In their second innings, the West Indies scored 283 all out with help from Brian Lara (64) and Jimmy Adams (79*). Allan Donald and Richard Snell took 4 wickets each. This left South Africa requiring 201 runs for victory.

After the loss of two early wickets to Curtly Ambrose, half-centuries from Kepler Wessels (74) and Peter Kirsten (52) steadied the South African innings. However, after Wessels' dismissal to Courtney Walsh, South Africa collapsed from 123/2 to 148 all out as Ambrose (6 wickets) and Walsh (4 wickets) demolished the rest of the batting line-up. Four players were out for ducks, and after Wessels and Kirsten, the next highest score was only 4.

Curtly Ambrose and Andrew Hudson were jointly named Men of the Match — Ambrose for his match-winning spell of 6/34 and Hudson for his 163.

== Notes ==
- Playfair Cricket Annual
- Wisden Cricketers Almanack (annual)

== External sources ==
- Cricinfo
- CricketArchive
