= West Indian cricket team in Australia in 1992–93 =

International cricket tour

	West Indies	Australia
- Dates: 2 November 1992 – 1 February 1993
Captains	RB Richardson	AR Border

Test series
- Result: West Indies won the 5-match series 2–1
Most runs	DC Boon 490	BC Lara 466
Most wickets	MG Hughes 20	CEL Ambrose 33
- Player of the series: CEL Ambrose (WI)

The West Indies cricket team toured Australia during the 1992-93 cricket season and played five Test matches against Australia. The two teams competed for the Frank Worrell Trophy, which the West Indies had held since 1978 and the series was sponsored by Benson & Hedges. West Indies won the series 2–1 with two matches drawn.

The West Indies won the fourth test match by one run, the smallest winning margin (by runs) in the history of test cricket.

In addition to the Test series, the West Indies also played some tour matches against Sheffield Shield and representative teams, and competed in the limited-overs 1992–93 Australian Tri-Series against Australia and Pakistan.

== Test series summary ==
=== First Test ===
27 November–1 December 1992
(5-day match)
Scorecard

Australia	v	West Indies
293 (112.1 overs); AR Border 73 (163); CL Hooper 4/75 (30.1 overs)		371 (124.3 overs); KLT Arthurton 157* (343); BA Reid 5/112 (37 overs)
308 (120.2 overs); DC Boon 111 (259); CEL Ambrose 5/66 (32 overs)		133/8 (65 overs); RB Richardson 66 (181); CJ McDermott 4/35 (18 overs)

Match drawn
The Gabba, Brisbane
Umpires: TA Prue and SG Randell
Player of the match: DC Boon (AUS)

- Australia won the toss and elected to bat.
- DR Martyn (AUS) made his Test debut.

=== Second Test ===
26–30 December 1992
(5-day match)
Scorecard

Australia	v	West Indies
395 (153 overs); Mark Waugh 112 (234); Courtney Walsh 4/91 (39 overs)		233 (85.1 overs); Keith Arthurton 71 (185); Craig McDermott 4/66 (25.1 overs)
196 (91.4 overs); Damien Martyn 67* (141); Ian Bishop 3/45 (20 overs)		219 (71.2 overs); Phil Simmons 110 (178); Shane Warne 7/52 (23.2 overs)

Australia won by 139 runs
Melbourne Cricket Ground, Melbourne
Umpires: Steve Randell and Col Timmins
Player of the match: Shane Warne (AUS)

- Australia won the toss and elected to bat.
- Shane Warne (AUS) took his maiden Test five-wicket haul.
- Official attendance: 137,134

==== Day One ====
Returning after a two-week sabbatical from international cricket, Australian captain Allan Border again chose to bat after winning the toss. Openers David Boon and Mark Taylor batted with discipline and patience for much of the first session, combining for 38 before Taylor, who had scored 13 off 75 deliveries and was keen to increase the scoring tempo, attempted to play a cut shot to a ball close to the body from Courtney Walsh and ended up top-edging to Brian Lara at first slip. Steve Waugh joined Boon at the crease and the pair took Australia to 100 before Waugh fell for 38, after the umpires had confirmed that Lara had taken a low catch at first slip off Curtly Ambrose. After batting for just over three hours, Boon departed for a hard-fought 46; sensing an opportunity to reach what would have been a well-deserved half-century, he instead top-edged an attempted cut shot to a wide ball from Walsh through to the wicketkeeper David Williams. When Damien Martyn followed soon after thanks to a wonderful catch by Phil Simmons off Ambrose, Australia's score was 115 for four, with Border joining Mark Waugh at the crease.

After both players were given lives by Williams – Border was dropped on five when the West Indian keeper dived and got a glove on a leg-side deflection off Ambrose, and then Waugh on 23 survived a botched stumping off Hooper – they batted through the whole final session and lifted Australia's score to 227 for four, with Waugh 63 not out and Border reaching his 57th Test half-century just before the end of play to be 51 not out.

==== Day Two ====
Border and Waugh continued where they left off from the previous day, batting through the first session and eventually taking Australia past 300. Waugh was again dropped by Williams - this time off Ian Bishop - on 71 and survived several half-chances. Sensing Waugh's nervousness, Border sought to calm his partner and exhort him to concentrate and not throw his wicket away.

Eventually Waugh reached his third Test century, having been at the crease just short of five hours, and hitting nine fours. He was out soon after for 112, having added 204 runs with his captain to Australia's total. Having batted for over five hours, Border then also reached triple figures, sweeping Hooper for three to score his 25th Test century, and his first in Australia for five years. Speaking to the press at the end of the day's play, Border hit back at those questioning his place in the team:

I have read a lot of negative press in recent times about my position and maybe this has silenced it [...] There's no reason for me to fall off the perch just yet. I've scored nearly 10,000 runs at better than 50 every time and that's not too shabby at all. To get 100 against these fellows you earn every single run you get and that makes it doubly pleasing.

After the remaining batters pushed Australia's first innings score to 395, local hero Merv Hughes gave the MCG crowd something to cheer about, removing the top three West Indian batsmen in a lively six-over spell to reach 150 Test wickets. At stumps the West Indies score was 62 for three, having steadied the ship with Lara (14 not out) and Keith Arthurton (13 not out).

==== Day Three ====
As in the first Test in Brisbane, so Lara and Arthurton again rescued the West Indies innings, combining for a careful 100-run partnership and both reaching half-centuries.

=== Third Test ===
2–6 January 1993
(5-day match)
Scorecard

Australia	v	West Indies
503/9d (171.4 overs); SR Waugh 100 (207); CL Hooper 3/137 (45.4 overs)		606 (184.4 overs); BC Lara 277 (372); MG Hughes 3/76 (16.4 overs)
117/0 (47 overs); DC Boon 63* (134)

Match drawn
Sydney Cricket Ground, Sydney
Umpires: DB Hair and TA Prue
Player of the match: BC Lara (WIN)

- Australia won the toss and elected to bat.
- JR Murray (WIN) made his Test debut.
- BC Lara (WIN) made his maiden Test century and double century.

=== Fourth Test ===
23–26 January 1993
(5-day match)
Scorecard

West Indies	v	Australia
252 (67.3 overs); BC Lara 52 (76); MG Hughes 5/64 (21.3 overs)		213 (75.2 overs); MG Hughes 43 (66); CEL Ambrose 6/74 (28.2 overs)
146 (41.5 overs); RB Richardson 72 (106); TBA May 5/9 (6.5 overs)		184 (79 overs); JL Langer 54 (146); CEL Ambrose 4/46 (26 overs)

West Indies won by 1 run
Adelaide Oval, Adelaide
Umpires: DB Hair and LJ King
Player of the match: CEL Ambrose (WIN)

- West Indies won the toss and elected to bat.
- The match was scheduled for five days but completed in four.
- JL Langer (AUS) made his Test debut.

=== Fifth Test ===
30 January–1 February 1993
(5-day match)
Scorecard

Australia	v	West Indies
119 (47.2 overs); DC Boon 44 (122); CEL Ambrose 7/25 (18 overs)		322 (90.4 overs); PV Simmons 80 (147); MG Hughes 4/71 (25.4 overs)
178 (57 overs); DC Boon 52 (123); IR Bishop 6/40 (16 overs)

West Indies won by an innings and 25 runs
WACA Ground, Perth
Umpires: SG Randell and CD Timmins
Player of the match: CEL Ambrose (WIN)

- Australia won the toss and elected to bat.
- The match was scheduled for five days but completed in three.
- J Angel (AUS) and AC Cummins (WIN) made their Test debuts.
- CEL Ambrose (WIN) recorded his famous spell of 7-1 during this Test.
