= 1992–93 Total International Series =

International cricket tournament

- Date: 9 – 27 February 1993
- Location: South Africa
- Result: Won by West Indies; 1–0 in final
Teams
West Indies	Pakistan	South Africa
Captains
Richie Richardson	Wasim Akram	Kepler Wessels
Most runs
Brian Lara (341)	Javed Miandad (225)	Kepler Wessels (166)
Most wickets
Ian Bishop (14)	Waqar Younis (16)	Meyrick Pringle (9)

The 1993 Total International Series was a cricket tournament held in South Africa, between 9–27 February 1993. Three national teams took part: Pakistan, South Africa and West Indies.

The 1993 Total International Series started with a double round-robin tournament where each team played the other three times. The two leading teams qualified for the final. West Indies won the tournament. Pakistan finished runners-up while South Africa were eliminated at the group stage.

== Matches ==
=== Group stage ===
Team	P	W	L	T	NR	NRR	Points
West Indies	6	4	2	0	0	1.054	8
Pakistan	6	3	3	0	0	-1.028	6
South Africa	6	2	4	0	0	-0.173	4

==== 1st ODI ====
9 February 1993
Scorecard

Pakistan; 208/6 (50 overs)	v	South Africa; 198 (50 overs)
Asif Mujtaba 49 (66); BM McMillan 2/35 (10 overs)		AC Hudson 93 (124); Waqar Younis 5/25 (10 overs)

Pakistan won by 10 runs
Kingsmead Cricket Ground, Durban
Umpires: KE Liebenberg (SA) and CJ Mitchley (SA)
Player of the match: Waqar Younis (PAK)

- South Africa won the toss and elected to field.
- DJ Cullinan (SA) made his ODI debut.

==== 2nd ODI ====
11 February 1993
Scorecard

West Indies; 149 (49 overs)	v	South Africa; 150/4 (46.5 overs)
DL Haynes 43 (104); AA Donald 3/27 (10 overs)		JN Rhodes 46* (77); BP Patterson 2/46 (8.5 overs)

South Africa won by 6 wickets
St George's Park Cricket Ground, Port Elizabeth
Umpires: RE Koertzen (SA) and SB Lambson (SA)
Player of the match: JN Rhodes (SA)

- South Africa won the toss and elected to field.

==== 3rd ODI ====
13 February 1993
Scorecard

Pakistan; 150 (41.5 overs)	v	West Indies; 109/2 (25.1 overs)
Shoaib Mohammad 49 (69); IR Bishop 4/25 (9.5 overs)		DL Haynes 50* (76); Waqar Younis 2/19 (5 overs)

West Indies won by 8 wickets (rain rule)
Wanderers Stadium, Johannesburg
Umpires: SB Lambson (SA) and CJ Mitchley (SA)
Player of the match: DL Haynes (WI)

- Pakistan won the toss and elected to bat.
- West Indies' target was reduced to 106 runs in 27 overs.

==== 4th ODI ====
15 February 1993
Scorecard

Pakistan; 214/6 (50 overs)	v	South Africa; 162 (30.1 overs)
Javed Miandad 107 (144); PS de Villiers 4/27 (10 overs)		WJ Cronje 81 (70); Wasim Akram 5/16 (6.1 overs)

Pakistan won by 9 runs (rain rule)
Buffalo Park, East London
Umpires: WA Diedricks (SA) and KE Liebenberg (SA)
Player of the match: Javed Miandad (PAK)

- Pakistan won the toss and elected to bat.
- South Africa's target was reduced to 172 runs in 31 overs.
- ELR Stewart (SA) made his ODI debut.

==== 5th ODI ====
17 February 1993
Scorecard

South Africa; 140/9 (50 overs)	v	West Indies; 136 (47 overs)
DJ Cullinan 40 (56); CL Hooper 2/1 (1 over)		CL Hooper 34 (71); MW Pringle 3/27 (9 overs); WJ Cronje 3/27 (8 overs)

South Africa won by 4 runs
Newlands Cricket Ground, Cape Town
Umpires: RE Koertzen (SA) and CJ Mitchley (SA)
Player of the match: WJ Cronje (SA)

- West Indies won the toss and elected to field.

==== 6th ODI ====
19 February 1993
Scorecard

West Indies; 268/5 (50 overs)	v	Pakistan; 144 (46.5 overs)
BC Lara 128 (125); Waqar Younis 3/53 (10 overs)		Javed Miandad 67 (94); IR Bishop 4/32 (10 overs)

West Indies won by 124 runs
Kingsmead Cricket Ground, Durban
Umpires: WA Diedricks (SA) and SB Lambson (SA)
Player of the match: BC Lara (WI)

- Pakistan won the toss and elected to field.

==== 7th ODI ====
21 February 1993
Scorecard

Pakistan; 220/8 (50 overs)	v	South Africa; 198/9 (50 overs)
Aamer Sohail 62 (92); MW Pringle 3/52 (10 overs)		KC Wessels 39 (76); Mushtaq Ahmed 2/29 (10 overs)

Pakistan won by 22 runs
Centurion Park, Verwoerdburg
Umpires: RE Koertzen (SA) and CJ Mitchley (SA)
Player of the match: Rameez Raja (PAK)

- Pakistan won the toss and elected to bat.

==== 8th ODI ====
23 February 1993
Scorecard

South Africa; 185/6 (50 overs)	v	West Indies; 188/1 (44.3 overs)
KC Wessels 49 (89); PV Simmons 2/36 (10 overs)		BC Lara 111* (140); RP Snell 1/36 (10 overs)

West Indies won by 9 wickets
Goodyear Park, Bloemfontein
Umpires: SB Lambson (SA) and KE Liebenberg (SA)
Player of the match: BC Lara (WI)

- South Africa won the toss and elected to bat.

==== 9th ODI ====
25 February 1993
Scorecard

Pakistan; 43 (19.5 overs)	v	West Indies; 45/3 (12.3 overs)
Zahid Fazal 21 (44); CA Walsh 4/16 (9 overs)		BC Lara 26* (34); Wasim Akram 2/22 (6 overs)

West Indies won by 7 wickets
Newlands Cricket Ground, Cape Town
Umpires: WA Diedricks (SA) and KE Liebenberg (SA)
Player of the match: CA Walsh (WI)

- West Indies won the toss and elected to field.
- Ghulam Ali (PAK) made his ODI debut.
- Pakistan's score was, at the time, the lowest in One-Day Internationals.

=== Final ===
27 February 1993
Scorecard

Pakistan; 187 (50 overs)	v	West Indies; 190/5 (39.4 overs)
Aamer Sohail 57 (95); CEL Ambrose 3/33 (10 overs)		DL Haynes 59 (77); Aamer Sohail 2/32 (10 overs)

West Indies won by 5 wickets
Wanderers Stadium, Johannesburg
Umpires: SB Lambson (SA) and KE Liebenberg (SA)
Player of the match: Aamer Sohail (PAK)

- West Indies won the toss and elected to field.
