= 1992–93 Australian Tri-Series =

International cricket tournament

1992–93 World Series
- Date: 4 December 1992 – 18 January 1993
- Location: Australia
- Result: West Indies won the finals 2–0
- Player of the series: Phil Simmons (Win)
Teams
Australia	Pakistan	West Indies
Captains
Allan Border	Javed Miandad	Richie Richardson
Most runs
Mark Taylor (286)	Rameez Raja (225)	Brian Lara (331)
Most wickets
Craig McDermott (13)	Waqar Younis (11)	Curtly Ambrose (18)

The 1992–93 World Series was a One Day International (ODI) cricket tri-series where Australia played host to Pakistan and West Indies. Australia and West Indies reached the finals, which West Indies won 2–0. This was the last series and the last time West Indies would wear a grey uniform in One Day Cricket. Australia and West Indies did not play the best of 3 finals again until the 2000-01 One Day Series.

== Points table ==
Pos	Team	P	W	L	NR	T	Points
1	Australia	8	5	2	0	1	11
2	West Indies	8	5	3	0	0	10
3	Pakistan	8	1	6	0	1	3

== Result summary ==
4 December 1992 (D/N)
Scorecard

West Indies; 197/9 (50 overs)	v	Pakistan; 199/5 (49.2 overs)
BC Lara 59 (101); Wasim Akram 4/46 (9 overs)		Javed Miandad 59* (83); KCG Benjamin 2/46 (10 overs)

Pakistan won by 5 wickets
WACA Ground, Perth
Umpires: RJ Evans and LJ King
Player of the match: Wasim Akram (PAK)

- Pakistan won the toss and elected to field
- Ata-ur-Rehman (PAK) and KCG Benjamin and JR Murray (both WI) made their ODI debuts

6 December 1992
Scorecard

Australia; 160/7 (50 overs)	v	West Indies; 164/1 (38.3 overs)
ME Waugh 36 (80); PV Simmons 2/22 (10 overs)		DL Haynes 81* (121); PR Reiffel 1/12 (6 overs)

West Indies won by 9 wickets
WACA Ground, Perth
Umpires: RJ Evans and TA Prue
Player of the match: PV Simmons (WI)

- Australia won the toss and elected to bat

8 December 1992 (D/N)
Scorecard

Australia; 101/9 (30 overs)	v	West Indies; 87 (29.3 overs)
DM Jones 21 (54); PV Simmons 3/11 (6 overs)		AL Logie 20 (31); PR Reiffel 3/14 (6 overs)

Australia won by 14 runs
Sydney Cricket Ground, Sydney
Umpires: DB Hair and SG Randell
Player of the match: MA Taylor (AUS)

- West Indies won the toss and elected to field
- The match was reduced before play started to 30 overs per side
- DR Martyn (AUS) made his ODI debut

10 December 1992
Scorecard

Australia; 228/7 (50 overs)	v	Pakistan; 228/9 (50 overs)
DM Jones 53 (73); Aaqib Javed 2/35 (10 overs)		Saleem Malik 64 (99); CJ McDermott 4/42 (10 overs)

Match tied
Bellerive Oval, Hobart
Umpires: SG Randell and CD Timmins
Player of the match: Asif Mujtaba (PAK)

- Australia won the toss and elected to bat

Scorecard

12 December 1992
Scorecard https://www.cricinfo.com/series/benson-hedges-world-series-1992-93-60930/pakistan-vs-west-indies-5th-match-65497/full-scorecard

West Indies; 177/7 (42 overs)	v	Pakistan; 173 (41.5 overs)
RB Richardson 76* (112); Wasim Akram 3/38 (9 overs)		Rameez Raja 52 (80); CL Hooper 3/31 (7.5 overs)

West Indies won by 4 runs
Adelaide Oval, Adelaide
Umpires: SJ Davis and TA Prue
Player of the match: CL Hooper (WI)

- Pakistan won the toss and elected to field
- The match was reduced to 42 overs per side

13 December 1992
Scorecard

Pakistan; 195/6 (47 overs)	v	Australia; 196/2 (45 overs)
Inzamam-ul-Haq 60* (70); TBA May 2/27 (10 overs)		MA Taylor 78 (109); Aamer Sohail 1/36 (9 overs)

Australia won by 8 wickets
Adelaide Oval, Adelaide
Umpires: IS Thomas and CD Timmins
Player of the match: MA Taylor (AUS)

- Australia won the toss and elected to field
- The match was reduced before play started to 47 overs per side

15 December 1992 (D/N)
Scorecard

Australia; 198/8 (50 overs)	v	West Indies; 194 (50 overs)
ME Waugh 57 (70); CEL Ambrose 3/25 (10 overs)		BC Lara 74 (123); ME Waugh 5/24 (6 overs)

Australia won by 4 runs
Melbourne Cricket Ground, Melbourne
Umpires: LJ King and TA Prue
Player of the match: ME Waugh (AUS)

- Australia won the toss and elected to bat

17 December 1992 (D/N)
Scorecard

West Indies; 214/9 (50 overs)	v	Pakistan; 81 (48 overs)
DL Haynes 96 (152); Waqar Younis 3/29 (10 overs)		Inzamam-ul-Haq 17 (47); Waqar Younis 17 (35); PV Simmons 4/3 (10 overs)

West Indies won by 133 runs
Sydney Cricket Ground, Sydney
Umpires: DB Hair and IS Thomas
Player of the match: PV Simmons (WI)

- West Indies won the toss and elected to bat
- JC Adams (WI) made his ODI debut
- Simmons' analysis of 10-8-3-4 remains the most economical for a ten-over spell in an ODI.

9 January 1993
Scorecard

Pakistan; 71 (23.4 overs)	v	West Indies; 72/1 (19.2 overs)
Rashid Latif 22* (27); Ian Bishop 5/25 (8.4 overs)		DL Haynes 25* (62); Wasim Akram 1/33 (9 overs)

West Indies won by 9 wickets
Brisbane Cricket Ground, Woolloongabba, Brisbane
Umpires: SJ Davis and LJ King
Player of the match: Ian Bishop (WI)

- Pakistan won the toss and elected to bat

10 January 1993
Scorecard

West Indies; 197/9 (50 overs)	v	Australia; 190 (49 overs)
CL Hooper 56 (65); PR Reiffel 3/33 (10 overs)		ME Waugh 54 (72); BP Patterson 2/31 (10 overs)

West Indies won by 7 runs
Brisbane Cricket Ground, Woolloongabba, Brisbane
Umpires: IS Thomas and CD Timmins
Player of the match: CL Hooper (WI)

- Australia won the toss and elected to field

12 January 1993
Scorecard

Australia; 212/6 (50 overs)	v	Pakistan; 180/7 (50 overs)
DM Jones 84 (127); Asif Mujtaba 2/38 (9 overs)		Rameez Raja 40 (79); Javed Miandad 40 (59); CJ McDermott 2/26 (10 overs)

Australia won by 32 runs
Melbourne Cricket Ground, Melbourne
Umpires: DB Hair and CD Timmins
Player of the match: DM Jones (AUS)

- Australia won the toss and elected to bat

14 January 1993 (D/N)
Scorecard

Australia; 260/8 (50 overs)	v	Pakistan; 237/6 (50 overs)
SR Waugh 64 (65); Waqar Younis 3/55 (9 overs)		Rameez Raja 67 (85); AIC Dodemaide 2/30 (8 overs)

Australia won by 23 runs
Sydney Cricket Ground, Sydney
Umpires: TA Prue and SG Randell
Player of the match: SR Waugh (AUS)

- Australia won the toss and elected to bat

== Final series ==
West Indies won the best of three final series against Australia 2–0.

16 January 1993 (D/N)
Scorecard

West Indies; 239/8 (50 overs)	v	Australia; 214 (49.3 overs)
BC Lara 67 (81); GRJ Matthews 2/45 (10 overs); SR Waugh 2/45 (10 overs)		ME Waugh 51 (70); CEL Ambrose 5/32 (9.3 overs)

West Indies won by 25 runs
Sydney Cricket Ground, Sydney
Umpires: TA Prue and SG Randell

- West Indies won the toss and elected to bat
- Australian batsman Dean Jones requested Curtly Amrose remove his white wristbands when bowling because they were disturbing his concentration.

18 January 1993 (D/N)
Scorecard

Australia; 147 (47.3 overs)	v	West Indies; 148/6 (47 overs)
MA Taylor 33 (73); CEL Ambrose 3/26 (10 overs)		BC Lara 60 (100); AIC Dodemaide 2/19 (10 overs)

West Indies won by 4 wickets
Melbourne Cricket Ground, Melbourne
Umpires: DB Hair and CD Timmins

- Australia won the toss and elected to bat
