= West Indian cricket team in Kenya in 2001 =

West Indians in Kenya in 2001
	West Indies	Kenya
- Dates: 4 August – 19 August 2001
Captains	Carl Hooper	Maurice Odumbe

One Day International series
- Results: West Indies won the 3-match series 3–0
Most runs	Chris Gayle; 232	Steve Tikolo; 85
Most wickets	Colin Stuart; 8	Martin Suji, Steve Tikolo; 3
- Player of the series: Chris Gayle

The West Indian cricket team in Kenya in 2001 played 3 One Day International games and won all of them. It was the first full tour to Kenya by a Test playing country. Collins and David Obuya made their ODI debuts.

== Schedule ==
Date	Match	Venue
August
15	1st ODI	Nairobi
18	2nd ODI	Nairobi
19	3rd ODI	Nairobi

== Squads ==
West Indies
- Carl Hooper (c)
- Courtney Browne (wk)
- Chris Gayle
- Daren Ganga
- Shivnarine Chanderpaul
- Marlon Samuels
- Ramnaresh Sarwan
- Wavell Hinds
- Reon King
- Corey Collymore
- Kerry Jeremy
- Neil McGarrell
- Mahendra Nagamootoo
- Dave Mohammed
- Dinanath Ramnarine
- Marlon Black
- Pedro Collins
Kenya
- Maurice Odumbe c
- Steve Tikolo
- Kennedy Otieno* wk
- Ravindu Shah
- Thomas Odoyo
- Hitesh Modi
- Tony Suji
- Collins Obuya
- Jimmy Kamande
- Martin Suji
- Peter Ongondo
- Brijal Patel
- Josephat Ababu
- David Obuya wk

- Otieno withdrew and was replaced by D.Obuya

== One Day Internationals (ODIs) ==
=== 1st ODI ===
15 August 2001
Scorecard

West Indies; 311/4 (50 overs)	v	Kenya; 205 (49.3 overs)
CH Gayle 152 (150); SO Tikolo 1/45 (7 overs)		TM Odoyo 40 (40); CEL Stuart 5/44 (10 overs)

West Indies won by 106 runs
Simba Union Ground, Nairobi
Umpires: SR Modi (KEN) and DL Orchard (SA)
Player of the match: CH Gayle (WI)

- Kenya won the toss and elected to field.
- CO Obuya and DO Obuya (both KEN) made their ODI debuts.

=== 2nd ODI ===
18 August 2001
Scorecard

Kenya; 192 (49.1 overs)	v	West Indies; 193/4 (45.5 overs)
PJ Ongondo 36 (42); RD King 4/32 (10 overs)		S Chanderpaul 87* (95); MA Suji 3/23 (8 overs)

West Indies won by 6 wickets
Gymkhana Club Ground, Nairobi
Umpires: NN Dave (KEN) and DL Orchard (SA)
Player of the match: S Chanderpaul (WI)

- Kenya won the toss and elected to bat.

=== 3rd ODI ===
19 August 2001
Scorecard

Kenya; 232/7 (50 overs)	v	West Indies; 234/3 (47.1 overs)
SO Tikolo 71 (65); NC McGarrell 3/44 (10 overs)		LV Garrick 76 (119); SO Tikolo 2/43 (10 overs)

West Indies won by 7 wickets
Gymkhana Club Ground, Nairobi
Umpires: R D'Mello (KEN) and DL Orchard (SA)
Player of the match: SO Tikolo (KEN)

- Kenya won the toss and elected to bat.
- BJ Patel (KEN) made his ODI debut.
