= Parth Desai =

Canadian cricketer (born 1990)

Personal information
- Born: 11 December 1990 (age 35); Navsari, Gujarat, India
- Batting: Right-handed
- Bowling: Slow left-arm orthodox

International information
- National side: Canada
- ODI debut (cap 70): 13 April 2010 v West Indies
- Last ODI: 28 January 2014 v Netherlands
- Only T20I (cap 38): 23 March 2012 v Scotland

Career statistics
Competition	ODI	T20I	FC	LA
Matches	13	1	2	20
Runs scored	8	4	1	27
Batting average	2.66	–	1.00	5.40
100s/50s	0/0	0/0	0/0	0/0
Top score	3*	4*	1	11
Balls bowled	612	18	234	902
Wickets	12	1	1	25
Bowling average	40.41	30.00	89.00	28.00
5 wickets in innings	0	0	0	0
10 wickets in match	0	0	0	0
Best bowling	3/35	1/30	1/6	4/29
Catches/stumpings	2/–	0/–	1/–	2/–
- Source: Cricinfo, 26 January 2025

Parth Desai (born 11 December 1990) is a Canadian cricketer. He made his One Day International debut for Canada against the West Indies in April 2010. His Twenty20 International debut came against Scotland on 23 March 2012. He played for Canada in the 2014 Cricket World Cup Qualifier tournament.
