= Sri Lankan cricket team in the West Indies in 1997 =

International cricket tour

Sri Lankan cricket team in West Indies in 1997
	Sri Lanka	West Indies
- Dates: 6 June 1997 – 24 June 1997
Captains	Arjuna Ranatunga	Courtney Walsh

Test series
- Result: West Indies won the 2-match series 1–0
Most runs	Sanath Jayasuriya (192)	Sherwin Campbell (182)
Most wickets	Muttiah Muralitharan (16)	Curtly Ambrose (11)

One Day International series
- Results: West Indies won the 1-match series 1–0
Most runs	Arjuna Ranatunga (53)	Stuart Williams (90)
Most wickets	Sanath Jayasuriya (5)	Laurie Williams (3)
- Player of the series: Stuart Williams

The Sri Lanka national cricket team toured the West Indies in June 1997 to play 2 Test matches and 1 Limited Overs Internationals. This was the first time Sri Lanka had played a Test match in the West Indies. Both series were won by the West Indies. Sri Lanka were captained by Arjuna Ranatunga; the West Indies by Courtney Walsh.

== Squads ==
Test squads		ODI squads
Sri Lanka	West Indies	Sri Lanka	West Indies
Arjuna Ranatunga (c)	Courtney Walsh (c)	Arjuna Ranatunga (c)	Courtney Walsh (c)
Sanath Jayasuriya	Sherwin Campbell	Sanath Jayasuriya	Stuart Williams
Roshan Mahanama	Stuart Williams	Marvan Atapattu	Junior Murray (wk)
Russel Arnold	Floyd Reifer	Aravinda de Silva	Franklyn Rose
Aravinda de Silva	Brian Lara	Hashan Tillakaratne	Brian Lara
Hashan Tillakaratne	Carl Hooper	Roshan Mahanama	Carl Hooper
Romesh Kaluwitharana (wk)	Roland Holder	Romesh Kaluwitharana (wk)	Floyd Reifer
Kumar Dharmasena	Courtney Browne	Kumar Dharmasena	Roland Holder
Ravindra Pushpakumara	Ian Bishop	Dulip Liyanage	Laurie Williams
Sajeewa de Silva	Curtly Ambrose	Muttiah Muralitharan	Curtly Ambrose
Muttiah Muralitharan	Franklyn Rose	Sajeewa de Silva	Dinanath Ramnarine
Marvan Atapattu
Sanjeeva Ranatunga

== ODI series ==
=== Only ODI ===
6 June 1997
Scorecard

West Indies; 283/7 (49 overs)	v	Sri Lanka; 248/8 (49 overs)
Stuart Williams 90 (107); Sanath Jayasuriya 5/58 (10 overs)		Arjuna Ranatunga 53 (78); Laurie Williams 3/56 (8 overs)

West Indies won by 35 runs
Queen's Park Oval, Port of Spain, Trinidad
Umpires: Clyde Cumberbatch (WI) & Eddie Nicholls (WI)
Player of the match: Stuart Williams

- Sri Lanka, who chose to field
- ST Jayasuriya retired hurt on 7* from 8/1 (2.2 ov) to 39/3 (after facing 6 balls)
- D Ramnarine and FL Reifer (West Indies) made their ODI debuts

== Test series summary ==
=== 1st Test ===
13–17 June 1997
Scorecard

Sri Lanka	v	West Indies
223 (68.1 overs); Sanath Jayasuriya 85 (115); Curtly Ambrose 5/37 (13.1 overs)		189 (60.4 overs); Sherwin Campbell 50 (117); Muttiah Muralitharan 5/34 (23.4 overs)
152 (35 overs); Aravinda de Silva 47 (52); Curtly Ambrose 3/41 (9 overs)		189/4 (49.2 overs); Stuart Williams 83 (118); Muttiah Muralitharan 3/72 (21.2 overs)

West Indies won by 6 wickets
Antigua Recreation Ground, St John's, Antigua
Umpires: Lloyd Barker (WI) and Steve Dunne (NZ)
Player of the match: Curtly Ambrose (WI)

- West Indies won the toss and elected to field.
- Floyd Reifer (WI) made his Test debut.

=== 2nd Test ===
20–24 June 1997
Scorecard

West Indies	v	Sri Lanka
147 (44.4 overs); Carl Hooper 81 (118); Ravindra Pushpakumara 5/41 (12.4 overs)		222 (63.4 overs); Sanath Jayasuriya 90 (148); Carl Hooper 5/26 (13.4 overs)
343 (102 overs); Brian Lara 115 (207); Muttiah Muralitharan 5/113 (41 overs)		233/8 (68 overs); Aravinda de Silva 78 (124); Courtney Walsh 4/73 (24 overs)

Match drawn
Arnos Vale Ground, Kingstown, St Vincent
Umpires: Steve Bucknor (WI) and Doug Cowie (NZ)
Player of the match: Carl Hooper (WI)

- Sri Lanka won the toss and elected to field.
- Courtney Walsh (WI) set the record for the most ducks scored in Tests (25).
