= Canadian cricket team in the West Indies in 2009–10 =

Canadian cricket team in West Indies in 2010
	Canada	West Indies
- Dates: 13 April 2010 – 13 April 2010
Captains	Ashish Bagai	Darren Sammy

One Day International series
Most runs	Umar Bhatti 32	Shivnarine Chanderpaul 101
Most wickets	Hiral Patel 1	Nikita Miller 3

The Canada cricket team toured West Indies on 13 April 2010. They played a single One Day International at Sabina Park, Kingston, Jamaica where they lost by 208 runs.

== Only ODI ==
13 April
Scorecard

West Indies; 316/4 (50.0 overs)	v	Canada; 108 (39.2 overs)
Shivnarine Chanderpaul 101 (120); Hiral Patel 1/28 (4 overs)		Umar Bhatti 32* (77); Nikita Miller 3/15 (9.2 overs)

West Indies won by 208 runs
Sabina Park, Kingston, Jamaica
Umpires: Norman Malcolm and Ian Ramage
Player of the match: Shivnarine Chanderpaul (West Indies)

- West Indies won the toss and elected to bat.
- Parth Desai (Can) made his ODI debut.
