= Scorecard =

A scorecard may refer to:

- Balanced scorecard, a tool used by managers to measure employee performance
- Credit scorecards, a tool used to assess customers for creditworthiness
- Scorecard (baseball), a record of a baseball game's details
- Scorecard (cricket), a summary of a cricket match's statistics
- Scorecard (golf), a record of a golfer's score
