= West Indian cricket team in Bangladesh in 1999–2000 =

The West Indies cricket team toured Bangladesh in October 1999 and played a single first-class against the Bangladesh national team. This was the year before Bangladesh was elevated to Test status as a full member of the International Cricket Conference (the ICC). The match was drawn. In addition, the teams played a two-match series of Limited Overs Internationals (LOI) which West Indies won 2–0. The captains were Brian Lara of West Indies and Aminul Islam of Bangladesh.

== ODI series ==
West Indies won the Biman Millennium Cup 2–0.

=== 1st ODI ===
8 October 1999 (D/N)
Scorecard

West Indies; 292/6 (50 overs)	v	Bangladesh; 219/5 (50 overs)
S Chanderpaul 92* (110); Manjural Islam 2/63 (10 overs)		Al Sahariar 62* (103); JC Adams 3/24 (7 overs)

West Indies won by 73 runs
Bangabandhu National Stadium, Dhaka
Umpires: BC Cooray (SL) and Riazuddin (PAK)
Player of the match: JC Adams (WI)

- West Indies won the toss and elected to bat.

=== 2nd ODI ===
9 October 1999 (D/N)
Scorecard

West Indies; 314/6 (50 overs)	v	Bangladesh; 205 (49.1 overs)
BC Lara 117 (62); Enamul Haque 2/45 (10 overs)		Aminul Islam 66 (89); SL Campbell 4/30 (10 overs)

West Indies won by 109 runs
Bangabandhu National Stadium, Dhaka
Umpires: BC Cooray (SL) and Riazuddin (PAK)
Player of the match: BC Lara (WI)

- West Indies won the toss and elected to bat.
- Ahmed Kamal (BAN) made his ODI debut.
