= Colin Stuart (cricketer) =

West Indian cricketer (born 1973)

Personal information
- Full name: Colin Ellsworth Laurie Stuart
- Born: September 28, 1973 (age 53); Georgetown, Guyana
- Batting: Right-handed
- Bowling: Right-arm fast-medium

International information
- National side: West Indies
- Test debut (cap 238): 26 December 2000 v Australia
- Last Test: 21 November 2001 v Sri Lanka
- ODI debut (cap 105): 17 January 2001 v Australia
- Last ODI: 19 August 2001 v Kenya

Domestic team information
- Years: Team
- 1994/95–2002/03: Guyana

Career statistics
Competition	Test	ODI	FC	LA
Matches	6	5	52	20
Runs scored	24	3	352	31
Batting average	3.42	–	7.48	5.16
100s/50s	0/0	0/0	0/0	0/0
Top score	12*	3*	33	14
Balls bowled	1,116	258	7,851	840
Wickets	20	8	144	23
Bowling average	31.39	25.62	30.09	26.95
5 wickets in innings	0	1	1	1
10 wickets in match	0	0	0	0
Best bowling	3/33	5/44	5/58	5/44
Catches/stumpings	2/–	1/–	18/–	2/–
- Source: CricInfo, 25 January 2006

Colin Ellsworth Laurie Stuart (born 28 September 1973) is a Guyanese cricketer, who has played for the West Indies.

In six Test matches, Stuart, who was a right-hand batsman, had a batting average of 3.42 average, and as a right-arm, medium-fast bowler, has taken 20 wickets with a 31.39 average.

Stuart took part in the only instance in Test cricket history, when three bowlers were used in completing one over. In 2001, playing against the hosts, Sri Lanka at the Asgiriya Stadium in Kandy, Mervyn Dillon contracted abdominal pains after bowling two balls of his third over. Stuart replaced him, only to be banned from bowling for the remainder of Sri Lanka's innings, by the umpire, John Hampshire, after delivering two high, fast full-tosses (called as no-balls) in his first three balls. Chris Gayle then bowled the final three legitimate deliveries of the over.
