= David Williams (cricketer, born 1963) =

West Indian cricketer (born 1963)

Personal information
- Full name: David Williams
- Born: 4 November 1963 (age 63); Penal, Trinidad and Tobago
- Batting: Right-handed
- Bowling: Leg break
- Role: Wicket-keeper

International information
- National side: West Indies (1988-1998)
- Test debut: 18 April 1992 v South Africa
- Last Test: 12 March 1998 v England
- ODI debut: 5 January 1988 v India
- Last ODI: 19 December 1997 v England

Domestic team information
- Years: Team
- 1982–1999: Trinidad and Tobago

Career statistics
Competition	Tests	ODIs	FC	LA
Matches	11	36	124	103
Runs scored	242	147	3,063	720
Batting average	13.44	9.18	18.79	14.69
100s/50s	0/1	0/0	2/8	0/1
Top score	65	32*	112	53
Balls bowled	0	0	60	24
Wickets	–	–	0	0
Bowling average	–	–	–	–
5 wickets in innings	–	–	0	0
10 wickets in match	–	–	0	0
Best bowling	–	–	0/42	0/20
Catches/stumpings	40/2	35/10	286/50	91/33
- Source: ESPN Cricinfo, 20 October 2010

David Dewitt Williams (born 4 November 1963) is a former West Indian cricketer who played in 11 Tests and 36 ODIs from 1988 to 1998.

A diminutive man, at 5 foot 4, Williams struggled to grab Jeff Dujon's place in the international side not least because of his inability to contribute the weight of runs Dujon managed. Compared to Dujon's Test batting average of 31.94, Williams achieved just 13.44, with just one score of 50 or more, that was a 65 against England in 1998 which helped them to a three wicket win in Trinidad. However three consecutive ducks followed that innings and he was dropped for the final test of the series.

Williams played 71 first class matches for Trinidad and Tobago between 1983 and 1999 averaging 22.31, with 151 catches and 39 stumpings, his highest score was 112.

Williams was appointed to the role of assistant coach to the West Indies team in 2007 prior to the first World Twenty20 World Championships. He made a surprise return to the field in March 2009, during the final day of the fourth Test against England in Barbados, where he enthusiastically undertook the role of substitute fielder.
