= Phil Simmons =

Former West Indian cricketer and head coach of Bangladesh Cricket Team

Personal information
- Full name: Philip Verant Simmons
- Born: 18 April 1963 (age 63); Arima, Trinidad and Tobago
- Batting: Right-handed
- Bowling: Right-arm medium
- Role: Batting all-rounder
- Relatives: Lendl Simmons (nephew)

International information
- National side: West Indies (1987–1999)
- Test debut (cap 191): 11 January 1988 v India
- Last Test: 17 November 1997 v Pakistan
- ODI debut (cap 51): 16 October 1987 v Pakistan
- Last ODI: 30 May 1999 v Australia

Domestic team information
- Years: Team
- 1983–2001: Trinidad and Tobago
- 1989–1990: Durham
- 1992–1993: Border
- 1994–1998: Leicestershire
- 1996–2000: Easterns
- 2000–2002: Wales Minor Counties

Head coaching information
- Years: Team
- 2004–2005: Zimbabwe
- 2007–2015: Ireland
- 2015–2016: West Indies
- 2017–2019: Afghanistan
- 2019–2022: West Indies
- 2024–present: Bangladesh

Career statistics
| Competition | Test | ODI | FC | LA |
|---|---|---|---|---|
| Matches | 26 | 143 | 207 | 306 |
| Runs scored | 1,002 | 3,675 | 11,682 | 8,929 |
| Batting average | 22.26 | 28.93 | 35.61 | 33.19 |
| 100s/50s | 1/4 | 5/18 | 24/65 | 12/54 |
| Top score | 110 | 122 | 261 | 166* |
| Balls bowled | 624 | 2,876 | 13,196 | 9,616 |
| Wickets | 4 | 83 | 214 | 214 |
| Bowling average | 64.25 | 34.65 | 28.68 | 34.49 |
| 5 wickets in innings | 0 | 0 | 5 | 3 |
| 10 wickets in match | 0 | 0 | 0 | 0 |
| Best bowling | 2/34 | 4/3 | 7/49 | 5/33 |
| Catches/stumpings | 26/– | 55/– | 241/– | 137/– |
Medal record
Men's cricket
Representing West Indies as Coach
ICC Men's T20 World Cup
| Winner | 2016 India |
- Source: Cricinfo, 25 March 2010

Philip Verant Simmons (born 18 April 1963) is a Trinidadian cricket coach and former player who is currently a coach of the Bangladesh national cricket team. He played international cricket for the West Indies from 1987 to 1999 as an opening batsman and right-arm medium pace bowler. He excelled in the One Day International (ODI) format and represented the West Indies at three World Cups.

After retiring from playing, Simmons spent two periods as head coach of the West Indies (2015–2016 and 2019–2022). He has also spent stints in charge of Zimbabwe (2004–2005), Ireland (2007–2015), and Afghanistan (2017–2019). During his time with the West Indies, he led the team to victory in the 2016 T20 World Cup.

== Early life ==
Simmons' first home was in Arima, Trinidad, a few miles outside Port of Spain. He lived just two doors down from Larry Gomes, a former West Indian batsman. He proved to be adept at a number of sports, but excelled at cricket and was soon playing for the regional side East Zone. He made the leap to represent Trinidad and Tobago in 1983 with the help and encouragement of Rohan Kanhai, the coach at East Zone.

== Domestic career ==
At the domestic level, Simmons featured for Trinidad and Tobago, English sides Durham and Leicestershire, along with South African clubs Border and Easterns.

During the 1996 season with Leicestershire, he marked his debut for the club in scoring 261, his highest score for the club, with 34 fours and four sixes against Northamptonshire. He went on to accumulate 1,244 runs with 56 wickets and 35 catches, helping his side to win the County Championship for only the second time in their history. Simmons also won the PCA Player of the Year award in 1996.

He was thereafter named as a Wisden Cricketer of the Year in 1997. Simmons later helped Leicestershire to win another County Championship title in 1998. During that campaign he took over the captaincy from James Whitaker and Chris Lewis. At the time, Whitaker was ailing with an injury and Lewis was reprimanded for indiscipline. With Simmons at the helm, Leicestershire went on a six-match winning streak and eventually claimed the title with a resounding triumph over Surrey at The Oval. Simmons eventually scored 11,682 runs at an average of 35.61 with 24 hundreds and 65 half centuries as well as 214 wickets picked up at an average of 28.68 with a sum of five 5-wicket hauls in his first-class career.

=== Serious injury ===
During a 1988 tour match against Gloucestershire on his debut tour of England, Simmons was struck on the head by a fast ball from David Lawrence in bad light at Bristol. His heart stopped and he required emergency surgery at Frenchay Hospital, from which he recovered fully.

== International career ==
Like many before him, Simmons found the transition to Test cricket difficult, making only one century in his Test career (110 at Melbourne, during the West Indies' 1992–93 tour of Australia, and finishing his career in 1997 with a batting average of just 22.26 in 26 matches.

Simmons proved more adept at the international one day game, playing a total of 143 ODI matches between 1987 and 1999. Starting his ODI career at the 1987 World Cup, he made two half-centuries (50 against Pakistan and 89 against Sri Lanka). At the 1992 edition, he played four matches including scoring 110 versus Sri Lanka. In December 1992, during the eighth match of the World Series Cup in Australia, Simmons won the Man of the Match award for his match-winning spell of 10 overs, 8 maidens, 3 runs, 4 wickets, with an economy of 0.30, against Pakistan. With this, Simmons holds the world record for most economical bowling performance (in terms of the fewest runs conceded) in an ODI among those who completed their maximum quota of overs (10 overs in a 50-over match). At Sharjah's Champions Trophy tri-series the following year, he was named player of the series; he scored three half-centuries and a total of 330 runs for the series. At the 1995–96 Australian Tri-Series which also included Sri Lanka, Simmons failed to impress for which he was not selected for the 1996 World Cup. He was, however, recalled prior to the 1999 edition, where he played four matches, including his final ODI match, against Australia in Manchester.

== Coaching career ==
Simmons' playing days came to a close in 2002. He then embarked on a coaching career, firstly working at Zimbabwe's Harare-based academy. In May 2004, he was appointed Zimbabwe's head coach, replacing Australia's Geoff Marsh. This came as the team was weakened due to the mass dismissal of several senior players. He found himself having to defend Zimbabwe's Test status in the midst of a losing streak, which included losses to Bangladesh and New Zealand. Simmons was eventually dismissed by the Zimbabwe Cricket Union in August 2005.

Simmons then succeeded Adrian Birrell as coach of the Ireland national cricket team after the 2007 World Cup. During his tenure, Ireland won a number of trophies and qualified for every major ICC event. He also steered them to victories over England at the 2011 World Cup, along with the West Indies and Zimbabwe at the 2015 Cricket World Cup. Simmons was at the helm with Ireland for over 224 matches, making him the longest-serving coach in international matches.

In March 2015, he accepted an offer to take charge as head coach of his native West Indies. WICB chief executive Michael Muirhead said of his signing, "Phil has a proven ability to develop players; while cultivating great team spirit and a winning culture, we have a number of young, talented players about whom he is excited to be coaching, and we believe he is the right fit."

In 2016, he led the West Indies team to a historic second T20 World Cup victory in India. At the time the former top-ranking cricket team was in a period of significant struggles, and he was tasked with bringing the team from near the bottom of the top ten rankings back into prominence.

He was the batting coach for Afghanistan national cricket team and later on was appointed as the head coach in 2017. In June 2019, he was named as the coach of the Brampton Wolves franchise team for the 2019 Global T20 Canada tournament. In October 2019, he was reappointed as the head coach of the West Indies team. He resigned after the 2022 T20 World Cup in Australia but coached the team until the conclusion of the recently ended test tour of Australia.

The Pakistan Super League (PSL) franchise Karachi Kings appointed him as the team head coach in 2023. The following year, he was appointed 'specialist coach' of Papua New Guinea ahead of the T20 World Cup. He was hired "as a consultant coach" for the tournament as it was to be held in the Caribbean.

=== Head coach of Bangladesh cricket team ===
On 15 October 2024, Simmons was appointed as the coach of the Bangladesh men's national cricket team. He was given a short-term contract that extends until the 2025 ICC Champions Trophy. Simmons replaced Chandika Hathurusingha, who had been sacked due to disciplinary issues..

Under his coaching, Bangladesh national cricket team whitewashed Pakistan at home for the first time in 2026. Besides, Bangladesh won an ODI series against Australia and made history by securing their first-ever ODI series victory over the Aussies. Bangladesh also achieved ODI series victories against Pakistan, the West Indies, and New Zealand at home.

In August 2026, Bangladesh visited Australia after 23 years to play a 2-test match series. In the first test at Darwin, they defeated Australia national cricket team by 9 wickets, their first-ever Test victory on Australian soil. Simmons also described this test win as the most memorable test win in his entire coaching career.

== Personal life ==
Phil Simmons is a fan of English football club Tottenham Hotspur. His nephew Lendl Simmons is a cricketer who has also featured for the West Indies.
