= Patrick Patterson (cricketer) =

West Indian Test cricketer

Personal information
- Full name: Balfour Patrick Patterson
- Born: 15 September 1961 (age 65); Williamsfield, Jamaica
- Bowling: Right-arm fast
- Role: Fast bowler

International information
- National side: West Indies (1986–1993)
- Test debut (cap 186): 21 February 1986 v England
- Last Test: 27 November 1992 v Australia
- ODI debut (cap 47): 18 February 1986 v England
- Last ODI: 25 February 1993 v Pakistan

Domestic team information
- Years: Team
- 1982–1998: Jamaica
- 1984–1990: Lancashire
- 1984–85: Tasmania

Career statistics
Competition	Tests	ODIs	FC	LA
Matches	28	59	161	100
Runs scored	145	44	618	106
Batting average	6.59	8.80	5.83	10.60
100s/50s	0/0	0/0	0/0	0/0
Top score	21*	13*	29	16
Balls bowled	4,829	3,050	24,346	5,115
Wickets	93	90	493	144
Bowling average	30.90	24.51	27.51	24.27
5 wickets in innings	5	1	25	1
10 wickets in match	0	0	2	0
Best bowling	5/24	6/29	7/24	6/29
Catches/stumpings	5/–	9/–	32/–	15/–
- Source: Cricket Archive, 19 October 2010

Balfour Patrick Patterson (born 15 September 1961) is a former fast bowler for the West Indies cricket team in the mid-1980s to early 1990s. He is remarkable in that, in an era when the West Indies dominated world cricket through strength of fast bowling, and produced a galaxy of fast bowling stars, he is frequently acknowledged as the fastest of those that played. The West Indies wicket keeper Jeff Dujon, who kept wicket to all of them, stated that Patterson was the quickest he had kept wickets to.

== Early life ==
Born in Portland, Jamaica to Maurice and Emelda, Patterson attended Happy Grove High School and Wolmer's School, receiving his Jamaica School Certificate.

Patterson's father and grandfather played parish level cricket in Jamaica and Patterson showed ability from an early age and made his debut for Jamaica in 1983. He also played for Lancashire in the English County Championship, between 1984 and 1990, and Tasmania in the Sheffield Shield in the 1984–85 season.

== Career ==
Patterson arrived on the international scene in the absence of Michael Holding for the 1986 Sabina Park Test against England, and was labeled as one of the fastest bowlers in the international game. Broadly built, aggressive and quick, Patterson took seven wickets on debut. He kept his place and became a regular new ball bowler for the West Indies. Graham Gooch, the experienced England opener, remarked that Patterson frightened him with his fast bowling.

Patterson returned figures of 5/24 in the first Test of the 1987/8 series against India, bowling them out in 30.3 overs, or little over one session of play on the first day. In a Test Match in Melbourne, 1988–89, during Christmas, just before second last day's play, Steve Waugh decided to bounce Patterson. At the end of the day's play, Patterson stormed into the Australian dressing room and threatened to kill all the opposition batsmen on the pitch on the fifth and final day of play. Australia were then dismissed for 114 chasing 400. Patterson finished with five wickets in the innings and nine wickets for the match.

He was dropped for disciplinary reasons after the 1992/93 tour of Australia, the last time the West Indies won a series in Australia. Patterson's career strike rate of 51.9 is amongst the best of all time, although his 93 Test wickets came at a slightly high average of 30.9 owing to his attacking nature and subsequent field settings, which always provided opportunity for runs as well as wickets.

== Post-retirement ==
In 2016, Andrew Miller wrote of Patterson, "[T]he utter anonymity of his post-cricket life merely adds to the legend. No one seems entirely sure what has become of him, lost back to the streets from whence he came." In 2017, after a number of years of trying to track him down, Indian journalist Bharat Sundaresan found Patterson in Kingston, Jamaica, where he has lived since he finished playing. Mental health issues have subdued him and separated him from his family, though lucid memories of his cricketing career remain.
