= Ian Bishop (cricketer) =

Trinidadian cricketer

Personal information
- Full name: Ian Raphael Bishop
- Born: 24 October 1967 (age 59); Belmont, Port of Spain, Trinidad and Tobago
- Nickname: Bish
- Height: 6 ft 5 in (1.96 m)
- Batting: Right-handed
- Bowling: Right-arm fast
- Role: Bowler

International information
- National side: West Indies (1988–1998)
- Test debut (cap 194): 25 March 1989 v India
- Last Test: 12 March 1998 v England
- ODI debut (cap 54): 21 May 1988 v England
- Last ODI: 4 November 1997 v Pakistan

Domestic team information
- Years: Team
- 1986–2000: Trinidad and Tobago
- 1989–1993: Derbyshire

Career statistics
Competition	Test	ODI	FC	LA
Matches	43	84	159	156
Runs scored	632	405	2,639	1,047
Batting average	12.15	16.20	15.52	19.03
100s/50s	0/0	0/0	2/3	0/1
Top score	48	33*	111	53
Balls bowled	8,407	4,332	26,560	7,731
Wickets	161	118	549	196
Bowling average	24.27	26.50	23.06	27.92
5 wickets in innings	6	2	23	2
10 wickets in match	0	0	1	0
Best bowling	6/40	5/25	7/34	5/25
Catches/stumpings	8/–	12/–	50/–	23/–
- Source: Cricket Archive, 20 October 2010

Ian Raphael Bishop (born 24 October 1967) is a Trinidadian cricket commentator and former cricketer who represented the West Indies cricket team between 1988 and 1998 in Tests and One Day Internationals. He played as a right-arm fast bowler.

== International career ==
He reached 100 test wickets in only 21 Test matches. A powerful fast bowler with a talent for outswing, he was among the fastest bowlers in the world before severe back injuries cut him down in 1991. He rehabilitated and made adjustments to his bowling action, returning strongly late in 1992. However, in 1993, he was struck by injuries again, not returning until mid-1995. Thus, what had been at one stage a highly promising career was substantially curtailed.

== International commentary ==
Bishop now tours the world as a commentator.

Bishop also commentated for Cricket on 5 for the highlights of the 2007 England Tests and the One Day International Series between the West Indies and India.

He was one of the match commentators when the West Indies won the 2004 ICC Champions Trophy Final, the 2012 ICC World Twenty20 Final, and Bishop's commentary of the 2016 ICC World Twenty20 Final was especially memorable when, after Carlos Brathwaite won the match with four consecutive sixes, Bishop said "Carlos Brathwaite! Carlos Brathwaite! Remember the name!" This has been looked back on as a "classic call" and an "iconic piece of commentary".

Between stints commentating on cricket, Bishop completed an MBA.

== Personal life ==
Bishop is a devout Christian. He is also a fan of English football team Manchester United and loves the NBA.
