= 1994–95 Wills Triangular Series =

International cricket tournament

- Date: 14 – 30 October 1994
- Location: Pakistan
- Result: Australia beat Pakistan in the finals
- Player of the series: Glenn McGrath (Aus)
Teams
Pakistan	Australia	South Africa
Captains
Saleem Malik	Mark Taylor	Kepler Wessels
Most runs
Inzamam-ul-Haq (240)	Mark Waugh (243)	Hansie Cronje (354)
Most wickets
Waqar Younis (6)	Damien Fleming (9)	Eric Simons (7)

The 1994–95 Wills Triangular Series was a One Day International cricket tournament played entirely in Pakistan. It was held in October, with players from Australia, South Africa and Pakistan. Tournament started with the match between Australia and South Africa. In the final, Australia defeated Pakistan by 64 runs to win the tournament.

Using the round robin format, each team played the others three times, before top two teams reaching the final.

== Group stage ==
=== Points table ===
Pos	Team	Pld	W	L	T	NR	BP	Pts	NRR
1	Pakistan	6	4	1	0	1	0	9	+4.773
2	Australia	6	4	1	0	1	0	9	+4.551
3	South Africa	6	0	6	0	0	0	0	−4.110

== Fixtures ==
=== 1st match ===
12 October
Scorecard

Australia; 207/6 (50 overs)	v	South Africa; 201/8 (50 overs)
Steve Waugh 56 (71); Tim Shaw 2/34 (10 overs)		Hansie Cronje 98 (130); Craig McDermott 3/32 (10 overs)

Australia won by 6 runs
Gaddafi Stadium, Lahore
Umpires: Athar Zaidi and Mohammad Aslam
Player of the match: Steve Waugh (Aus)

- Australia won the toss and elected to bat.

=== 2nd match ===
14 October
Scorecard

Pakistan; 200/8 (50 overs)	v	Australia; 201/3 (46 overs)
Inzamam-ul-Haq 59 (86); Damien Fleming 4/49 (10 overs)		David Boon 84 (131); Wasim Akram 1/26 (8 overs)

Australia won by 7 wickets
Ibn-e-Qasim Bagh Stadium, Multan
Umpires: Riazuddin and Saqib Qureshi
Player of the match: David Boon (Aus)

- Pakistan won the toss and elected to bat.

=== 3rd match ===
16 October
Scorecard

South Africa; 163/9 (50 overs)	v	Pakistan; 166/2 (44.4 overs)
Kepler Wessels 33 (66); Wasim Akram 2/28 (10 overs)		Saleem Malik 62* (85); Eric Simons 1/39 (10 overs)

Pakistan won by 8 wickets
National Stadium, Karachi
Umpires: Feroze Butt and Saleem Badar
Player of the match: Saleem Malik (Pak)

- South Africa won the toss and elected to bat.
- Derek Crookes (SA) made his ODI debut.

=== 4th match ===
18 October
Scorecard

Australia; 208/6 (50 overs)	v	South Africa; 186 (48.2 overs)
David Boon 43 (73); Eric Simons 2/41 (10 overs)		Hansie Cronje 64 (94); Shane Warne 4/40 (9.2 overs)

Australia won by 22 runs
Iqbal Stadium, Faisalabad
Umpires: Islam Khan and Khizer Hayat
Player of the match: Hansie Cronje (SA)

- Australia won the toss and elected to bat.

=== 5th match ===
20 October
Scorecard

Pakistan; 249/6 (50 overs)	v	South Africa; 210/5 (50 overs)
Ijaz Ahmed 110 (110); Craig Matthews 3/50 (10 overs)		Hansie Cronje 53 (80); Waqar Younis 2/35 (10 overs)

Pakistan won by 39 runs
Rawalpindi Cricket Stadium, Rawalpindi
Umpires: Javed Akhtar and Said Shah
Player of the match: Ijaz Ahmed (Pak)

- South Africa won the toss and elected to field.

=== 6th match ===
22 October
Scorecard

Australia; 250/6 (50 overs)	v	Pakistan; 251/1 (39 overs)
Mark Waugh 121* (134); Aaqib Javed 2/44 (10 overs)		Saeed Anwar 104* (119); Tim May 1/65 (9 overs)

Pakistan won by 9 wickets
Rawalpindi Cricket Stadium, Rawalpindi
Umpires: Saleem Badar and Siddiq Khan
Player of the match: Saeed Anwar (Pak)

- Pakistan won the toss and elected to field.

=== 7th match ===
24 October
Scorecard

South Africa; 251/6 (50 overs)	v	Australia; 252/7 (49.4 overs)
Hansie Cronje 100* (124); Glenn McGrath 2/22 (10 overs)		Michael Slater 54 (82); Fanie de Villiers 2/49 (10 overs)

Australia won by 3 wickets
Arbab Niaz Stadium, Peshawar
Umpires: Mohammad Nazir and Shakeel Khan
Player of the match: Hansie Cronje (SA)

- South Africa won the toss and elected to bat.

=== 8th match ===
26 October
Scorecard

Australia	v	Pakistan

Match abandoned
Jinnah Stadium, Gujranwala

- Both teams played a 15 over-a-side "exhibition" match.

=== 9th match ===
28 October
Scorecard

South Africa; 222/4 (50 overs)	v	Pakistan; 223/4 (44.3 overs)
Gary Kirsten 69 (97); Wasim Akram 1/36 (10 overs)		Ijaz Ahmed 98* (87); Eric Simons 3/49 (8.3 overs)

Pakistan won by 6 wickets
Iqbal Stadium, Faisalabad
Umpires: Afzaal Ahmed and Saleem Badar
Player of the match: Ijaz Ahmed (Pak)

- South Africa won the toss and elected to bat.

=== Final ===
30 October
Scorecard

Australia; 269/5 (50 overs)	v	Pakistan; 205 (46.5 overs)
Michael Slater 66 (76); Saleem Malik 3/31 (10 overs)		Basit Ali 63 (64); Glenn McGrath 5/52 (10 overs)

Australia won by 64 runs
Gaddafi Stadium, Lahore
Umpires: Khizer Hayat and Mohammad Aslam
Player of the match: Glenn McGrath (Ind)

- Australia won the toss and elected to bat.
- Phil Emery (Aus) made his ODI debut.

== Statistics ==
=== Batting ===
Most runs

Player	Matches	Runs	Avg	HS
(South Africa) Hansie Cronje	6	354	88.50	100*
(Australia) Mark Waugh	6	243	48.60	121*
(Pakistan) Inzamam-ul-Haq	6	240	60.00	91*
(Pakistan) Ijaz Ahmed	4	233	77.66	110
(Australia) Michael Slater	6	206	34.33	66

=== Bowling ===
Most wickets

Player	Matches	Wickets	Econ	BBI
(Australia) Damien Fleming	3	9	3.92	4/49
(Australia) Glenn McGrath	4	9	3.94	5/52
(Australia) Craig McDermott	6	7	4.25	3/32
(South Africa) Eric Simons	6	7	4.91	3/49
(South Africa) Craig Matthews	4	6	4.26	3/50
