= Australian cricket team in Pakistan in 1994–95 =

International cricket tour

The Australian cricket team toured Pakistan in 1994–95. The teams played three 5-day tests and took part in a triangular ODI series (along with South Africa). Pakistan won the test series 1 - 0. Shane Warne was declared Man of the Series. Australia won the Wills Triangular Series, beating Pakistan in the final.

== Test series summary ==
Pakistan won the test series 1–0, winning the first test by 1 wicket, and drawing the last two matches.

The first test was played at the National Stadium in Karachi on 28 September 1994. The second test was played at the Rawalpindi Cricket Stadium in Rawalpindi on 5 October 1994. The third test was played at the Gaddafi Stadium in Lahore on 1 November 1994.

In the first test, Wasim Akram and Shane Warne both took 8 wickets, with the latter being declared the man of the match. In the high scoring second test, Michael Slater scored 110 in the first innings, while Damien Fleming took 7 wickets (including a hat-trick in the second innings) for Australia. Saleem Malik scored 237 to earn man of the match honors for Pakistan. The third test featured three centurions for Pakistan, Moin Khan (115), Saleem Malik (143) (earning his 2nd man of the match honors for the series) and Aamer Sohail (105). Shane Warne took 9 wickets for Australia.

=== 1st Test ===
28 September-2 October 1994
(5-day match)
Scorecard

Australia	v	Pakistan
337 (88.2 overs); MG Bevan 82 (146); Wasim Akram 3/75 (25 overs); Waqar Younis 3/75 (19.2 overs)		256 (87.1 overs); Saeed Anwar 85 (124); J Angel 3/54 (13.1 overs)
232 (78 overs); DC Boon 114* (220); Wasim Akram 5/63 (22 overs)		315/9 (106.1 overs); Saeed Anwar 77 (179); SK Warne 5/89 (36.1 overs)

Pakistan won by 1 wicket
National Stadium, Karachi
Umpires: HD Bird (ENG) and Khizer Hayat (PAK)
Player of the match: SK Warne (AUS)

- Australia won the toss and elected to bat.
- MG Bevan (AUS) made his Test debut.

=== 2nd Test ===
5–9 October 1994
(5-day match)
Scorecard

Australia	v	Pakistan
521/9d (144.5 overs); MJ Slater 110 (155); Mohsin Kamal 3/109 (26 overs)		260 (76.4 overs); Aamer Sohail 80 (83); CJ McDermott 4/74 (22 overs)
14/1 (10 overs); DC Boon 7* (22); Waqar Younis 1/2 (5 overs)		537 (f/o) (152.1 overs); Saleem Malik 237 (328); DW Fleming 3/86 (26 overs)

Match drawn
Rawalpindi Cricket Stadium, Rawalpindi
Umpires: KE Liebenberg (SA) and Mahboob Shah (PAK)
Player of the match: Saleem Malik (PAK)

- Pakistan won the toss and elected to field.
- DW Fleming (AUS) made his Test debut.

=== 3rd Test ===
1–5 November 1994
(5-day match)
Scorecard

Pakistan	v	Australia
373 (120.5 overs); Moin Khan 115* (185); SK Warne 6/136 (41.5 overs)		455 (149.1 overs); MG Bevan 91 (223); Mohsin Kamal 4/116 (28 overs)
404 (109.1 overs); Saleem Malik 143 (242); GD McGrath 4/92 (25.1 overs)

Match drawn
Gaddafi Stadium, Lahore
Umpires: CJ Mitchley (SA) and Riazuddin (PAK)
Player of the match: Saleem Malik (PAK)

- Pakistan won the toss and elected to bat.
- PA Emery (AUS) made his Test debut.

== Wills Triangular Series ==
Australia won the Wills Triangular Series beating Pakistan in the final by 64 runs, with Glenn McGrath earning the man of the match honours for a 5 wicket haul.

The series included a round robin stage, where each team played the opponents 3 times. Pakistan and Australia finished the round robin series tied at the top of the table. Both teams had 9 points (winning 4, losing 1 and abandoning 1). South Africa failed to register a single point.

The eighth match of the series, scheduled for 26 October 1994, was abandoned due to a waterlogged pitch. However, the teams took part in a 15 over exhibition match, in which Pakistan beat Australia by 4 wickets.

== Tour Matches ==
Australia also played one 3-day first class tour match against President's XI at the Rawalpindi Cricket Stadium in Rawalpindi on 23 September 1994. The match was drawn.

== See also ==
- International cricket in 1994–95

== External sources ==
- CricketArchive
- ESPNcricinfo
