= International cricket in 1994–95 =

International cricket season

The 1994–1995 international cricket season was from September 1994 to April 1995.

== Season overview ==
International tours
Start date	Home team	Away team	Results [Matches]			
Start date	Home team	Away team	Test	ODI	FC	LA
28 September 1994	Pakistan	Australia	1–0 [3]	—	—	—
11 October 1994	Zimbabwe	Sri Lanka	0–0 [3]	1–2 [3]	—	—
17 October 1994	India	West Indies	1–1 [3]	4–1 [5]	—	—
25 November 1994	Australia	England	3–1 [5]	—	—	—
25 November 1994	South Africa	New Zealand	2–1 [3]	—	—	—
19 January 1995	South Africa	Pakistan	1–0 [1]	—	—	—
22 January 1995	New Zealand	West Indies	0–1 [2]	0–3 [3]	—	—
31 January 1995	Zimbabwe	Pakistan	1–2 [3]	1–1 [3]	—	—
4 March 1995	New Zealand	South Africa	0–1 [1]	—	—	—
8 March 1995	West Indies	Australia	1–2 [4]	4–1 [4]	—	—
11 March 1995	New Zealand	Sri Lanka	0–1 [2]	1–2 [3]	—	—
International tournaments
Start date	Tournament				Winners	
12 October 1994	(Pakistan) 1994–95 Wills Triangular Series				Australia	
23 October 1994	(India) 1994–95 Wills World Series				India	
2 December 1994	(South Africa) 1994–95 Mandela Trophy				South Africa	
2 December 1994	(Australia) 1994-95 Benson & Hedges World Series				Australia	
15 February 1995	1994-95 New Zealand Centenary Tournament				Australia	
5 April 1995	(United Arab Emirates) 1994-95 Asia Cup				India	

== September ==
=== Australia in Pakistan ===
Test series
No.	Date	Home captain	Away captain	Venue	Result
Test 1268	28 September-2 October	Saleem Malik	Mark Taylor	National Stadium, Karachi	Pakistan by 1 wicket
Test 1269	5–9 October	Saleem Malik	Mark Taylor	Rawalpindi Cricket Stadium, Rawalpindi	Match drawn
Test 1273	1–5 November	Saleem Malik	Mark Taylor	Gaddafi Stadium, Lahore	Match drawn

== October ==
=== Wills Triangular Series 1994-95 ===
Pos	Team	Pld	W	L	T	NR	BP	Pts	NRR
1	Pakistan	6	4	1	0	1	0	9	+4.773
2	Australia	6	4	1	0	1	0	9	+4.551
3	South Africa	6	0	6	0	0	0	0	−4.110

Group stage
No.	Date	Team 1	Captain 1	Team 2	Captain 2	Venue	Result
ODI 928	12 October	Australia	Mark Taylor	South Africa	Kepler Wessels	Gaddafi Stadium, Lahore	Australia by 6 runs
ODI 929	14 October	Pakistan	Saleem Malik	Australia	Mark Taylor	Ibn-e-Qasim Bagh Stadium, Multan	Australia by 7 wickets
ODI 930	16 October	Pakistan	Saleem Malik	South Africa	Kepler Wessels	National Stadium, Karachi	Pakistan by 8 wickets
ODI 932	18 October	Australia	Mark Taylor	South Africa	Kepler Wessels	Iqbal Stadium, Faisalabad	Australia by 22 runs
ODI 934	20 October	Pakistan	Saleem Malik	South Africa	Kepler Wessels	Rawalpindi Cricket Stadium, Rawalpindi	Pakistan by 39 runs
ODI 935	22 October	Pakistan	Saleem Malik	Australia	Mark Taylor	Rawalpindi Cricket Stadium, Rawalpindi	Pakistan by 9 wickets
ODI 937	24 October	Australia	Mark Taylor	South Africa	Kepler Wessels	Arbab Niaz Stadium, Peshawar	Australia by 3 wickets
ODI 937a	26 October	Pakistan	Saleem Malik	Australia	Mark Taylor	Jinnah Stadium, Gujranwala	Match abandoned
ODI 940	28 October	Pakistan	Saleem Malik	South Africa	Kepler Wessels	Iqbal Stadium, Faisalabad	Pakistan by 6 wickets
Final
No.	Date	Team 1	Captain 1	Team 2	Captain 2	Venue	Result
ODI 942	30 October	Pakistan	Saleem Malik	Australia	Mark Taylor	Gaddafi Stadium, Lahore	Australia by 63 runs

=== West Indies in India ===
ODI series
No.	Date	Home captain	Away captain	Venue	Result
ODI 931	17 October	Mohammad Azharuddin	Courtney Walsh	Nahar Singh Stadium, Faridabad	West Indies by 96 runs
ODI 933	20 October	Mohammad Azharuddin	Courtney Walsh	Wankhede Stadium, Mumbai	India by 8 runs
ODI 949	7 November	Mohammad Azharuddin	Courtney Walsh	Indira Priyadarshini Stadium, Visakhapatnam	India by 4 runs
ODI 950	9 November	Mohammad Azharuddin	Courtney Walsh	Barabati Stadium, Cuttack	India by 8 wickets
ODI 951	11 November	Mohammad Azharuddin	Brian Lara	Sawai Mansingh Stadium, Jaipur	India by 5 runs
Test series
No.	Date	Home captain	Away captain	Venue	Result
Test 1274	18–22 November	Mohammad Azharuddin	Courtney Walsh	Wankhede Stadium, Mumbai	India by 96 runs
Test 1277	1–5 December	Mohammad Azharuddin	Courtney Walsh	Vidarbha Cricket Association Ground, Nagpur	Match drawn
Test 1278	10–14 December	Mohammad Azharuddin	Courtney Walsh	PCA IS Bindra Stadium, Mohali	West Indies by 243 runs

=== Wills World Series 1994–95 ===
Team	Pld	W	L	NR	Pts
India	4	3	1	0	12
West Indies	4	2	1	1	10
New Zealand	4	0	3	1	2

Group stage
No.	Date	Team 1	Captain 1	Team 2	Captain 2	Venue	Result
ODI 936	23 October	India	Mohammad Azharuddin	West Indies	Courtney Walsh	MA Chidambaram Stadium, Chennai	India by 4 wickets
ODI 938	26 October	New Zealand	Ken Rutherford	West Indies	Courtney Walsh	Nehru Stadium, Margao	No result
ODI 939	28 October	India	Mohammad Azharuddin	New Zealand	Ken Rutherford	Reliance Stadium, Vadodara	India by 7 wickets
ODI 941	30 October	India	Mohammad Azharuddin	West Indies	Courtney Walsh	Green Park Stadium, Kanpur	West Indies by 46 runs
ODI 943	1 November	New Zealand	Ken Rutherford	West Indies	Courtney Walsh	Nehru Stadium, Guwahati	West Indies by 135 runs
ODI 944	3 November	India	Mohammad Azharuddin	New Zealand	Ken Rutherford	Feroz Shah Kotla, Delhi	India by 107 runs
Final
No.	Date	Team 1	Captain 1	Team 2	Captain 2	Venue	Result
ODI 947	5 November	India	Mohammad Azharuddin	West Indies	Courtney Walsh	Eden Gardens, Kolkata	India by 72 runs

=== Sri Lanka in Zimbabwe ===
Test series
No.	Date	Home captain	Away captain	Venue	Result
Test 1270	11–16 October	Andy Flower	Arjuna Ranatunga	Harare Sports Club, Harare	Match drawn
Test 1271	20–24 October	Andy Flower	Arjuna Ranatunga	Queens Sports Club, Bulawayo	Match drawn
Test 1272	26–31 October	Andy Flower	Arjuna Ranatunga	Harare Sports Club, Harare	Match drawn
ODI series
No.	Date	Home captain	Away captain	Venue	Result
ODI 945	3 November	Andy Flower	Arjuna Ranatunga	Harare Sports Club	Sri Lanka by 56 runs
ODI 946	5 November	Andy Flower	Arjuna Ranatunga	Harare Sports Club	Zimbabwe by 2 runs
ODI 948	6 November	Andy Flower	Arjuna Ranatunga	Harare Sports Club	Sri Lanka by 191 runs

== November ==
=== England in Australia ===
The Ashes Test series
No.	Date	Home captain	Away captain	Venue	Result
Test 1275	25–29 November	Mark Taylor	Mike Atherton	The Gabba, Brisbane	Australia by 184 runs
Test 1279	24–29 December	Mark Taylor	Mike Atherton	Melbourne Cricket Ground, Melbourne	Australia by 295 runs
Test 1281	1–5 January	Mark Taylor	Mike Atherton	Sydney Cricket Ground, Sydney	Match drawn
Test 1284	26–30 January	Mark Taylor	Mike Atherton	Adelaide Oval, Adelaide	England by 106 runs
Test 1287	3–7 February	Mark Taylor	Mike Atherton	WACA Ground, Perth	Australia by 329 runs

=== New Zealand in South Africa ===
Test series
No.	Date	Home captain	Away captain	Venue	Result
Test 1276	25–29 November	Hansie Cronje	Ken Rutherford	The Wanderers Stadium, Johannesburg	New Zealand by 137 runs
Test 1280	26–30 December	Hansie Cronje	Ken Rutherford	Kingsmead Cricket Ground, Durban	South Africa by 8 wickets
Test 1282	2–6 January	Hansie Cronje	Ken Rutherford	Newlands Cricket Ground, Cape Town	South Africa by 7 wickets

== December ==
=== Benson & Hedges World Series 1994-95 ===
Pos	Team	P	W	L	NR	T	Points	NRR
1	Australia	6	5	1	0	0	10	+0.43
2	Australia A	6	3	3	0	0	6	+0.09
3	England	6	3	3	0	0	6	+0.08
4	Zimbabwe	6	1	5	0	0	2	−0.59

Group stage
No.	Date	Team 1	Captain 1	Team 2	Captain 2	Venue	Result
ODI 952	2 December	Australia	Mark Taylor	Zimbabwe	Andy Flower	WACA Ground, Perth	Australia by 2 wickets
One Day	4 December	(Australia) AUS-A	Damien Martyn	Zimbabwe	Andy Flower	WACA Ground, Perth	(Australia) AUS-A by 5 wickets
ODI 955	6 December	Australia	Mark Taylor	England	Mike Atherton	Sydney Cricket Ground, Sydney	Australia by 28 runs
ODI 957	8 December	Australia	Mark Taylor	Zimbabwe	Andy Flower	Bellerive Oval, Hobart	Australia by 84 runs
One Day	10 December	(Australia) AUS-A	Damien Martyn	Zimbabwe	Andy Flower	Adelaide Oval, Adelaide	(Australia) AUS-A by 7 wickets
One Day	11 December	Australia	Mark Taylor	(Australia) AUS-A	Damien Martyn	Adelaide Oval, Adelaide	Australia by 6 runs
One Day	10 December	(Australia) AUS-A	Damien Martyn	England	Alec Stewart	Melbourne Cricket Ground, Melbourne	England by 31 runs
ODI 962	15 December	England	Mike Atherton	Zimbabwe	Andy Flower	Sydney Cricket Ground, Sydney	Zimbabwe by 13 runs
ODI 968	7 January	England	Mike Atherton	Zimbabwe	Andy Flower	The Gabba, Brisbane	England by 26 runs
One Day	8 January	Australia	Mark Taylor	(Australia) AUS-A	Damien Martyn	The Gabba, Brisbane	Australia by 34 runs
ODI 969	10 January	Australia	Mark Taylor	England	Mike Atherton	Melbourne Cricket Ground, Melbourne	England by 37 runs
One Day	12 January	(Australia) AUS-A	Damien Martyn	England	Mike Atherton	Sydney Cricket Ground, Sydney	(Australia) AUS-A by 29 runs
Finals
No.	Date	Team 1	Captain 1	Team 2	Captain 2	Venue	Result
One Day	15 January	Australia	Mark Taylor	(Australia) AUS-A	Damien Martyn	Sydney Cricket Ground, Sydney	Australia by 5 wickets
One Day	17 January	Australia	Mark Taylor	(Australia) AUS-A	Damien Martyn	Melbourne Cricket Ground, Melbourne	Australia by 6 wickets

=== Mandela Trophy 1994-95 ===
Place	Team	Played	Won	Lost	NR	Points
1	Pakistan	6	5	1	0	10
2	South Africa	6	4	2	0	8
3	Sri Lanka	6	2	3	1	5
4	New Zealand	6	0	5	1	1

Group stage
No.	Date	Team 1	Captain 1	Team 2	Captain 2	Venue	Result
ODI 953	2 December	Pakistan	Saleem Malik	Sri Lanka	Arjuna Ranatunga	Kingsmead Cricket Ground, Durban	Pakistan by 6 wickets
ODI 954	4 December	Pakistan	Saleem Malik	Sri Lanka	Arjuna Ranatunga	SuperSport Park, Centurion	Pakistan by 12 runs
ODI 956	6 December	South Africa	Hansie Cronje	New Zealand	Ken Rutherford	Newlands Cricket Ground, Cape Town	South Africa by 69 runs
ODI 958	8 December	New Zealand	Ken Rutherford	Sri Lanka	Arjuna Ranatunga	Mangaung Oval, Bloemfontein	No result
ODI 959	10 December	South Africa	Hansie Cronje	Pakistan	Saleem Malik	The Wanderers Stadium, Johannesburg	South Africa by 7 wickets
ODI 960	11 December	South Africa	Hansie Cronje	New Zealand	Ken Rutherford	SuperSport Park, Centurion	South Africa by 81 runs
ODI 961	13 December	New Zealand	Ken Rutherford	Pakistan	Saleem Malik	St George's Park, Port Elizabeth	Pakistan by 3 wickets
ODI 963	15 December	South Africa	Hansie Cronje	Sri Lanka	Arjuna Ranatunga	Mangaung Oval, Bloemfontein	Sri Lanka by 35 runs
ODI 964	17 December	South Africa	Hansie Cronje	Pakistan	Saleem Malik	Kingsmead Cricket Ground, Durban	Pakistan by 8 wickets
ODI 965	18 December	New Zealand	Ken Rutherford	Sri Lanka	Arjuna Ranatunga	Buffalo Park, East London	Sri Lanka by 5 wickets
ODI 966	19 December	New Zealand	Ken Rutherford	Pakistan	Saleem Malik	Buffalo Park, East London	Pakistan by 5 wickets
ODI 967	21 December	South Africa	Hansie Cronje	Sri Lanka	Arjuna Ranatunga	St George's Park, Port Elizabeth	South Africa by 44 runs
Finals
No.	Date	Team 1	Captain 1	Team 2	Captain 2	Venue	Result
ODI 970	10 January	South Africa	Hansie Cronje	Pakistan	Saleem Malik	Newlands Cricket Ground, Cape Town	South Africa by 37 runs
ODI 971	12 January	South Africa	Hansie Cronje	Pakistan	Saleem Malik	The Wanderers Stadium, Johannesburg	South Africa by 157 runs

== January ==
=== Pakistan in South Africa ===
One-off Test
No.	Date	Home captain	Away captain	Venue	Result
Test 1283	19–23 January	Hansie Cronje	Saleem Malik	The Wanderers Stadium, Johannesburg	South Africa by 324 runs

=== West Indies in New Zealand ===
ODI series
No.	Date	Home captain	Away captain	Venue	Result
ODI 972	22 January	Ken Rutherford	Courtney Walsh	Eden Park, Auckland	West Indies by 25 runs
ODI 973	25 January	Ken Rutherford	Courtney Walsh	Basin Reserve, Wellington	West Indies by 41 runs
ODI 974	28 January	Ken Rutherford	Courtney Walsh	AMI Stadium, Christchurch	West Indies by 9 wickets
Test series
No.	Date	Home captain	Away captain	Venue	Result
Test 1286	3–7 February	Ken Rutherford	Courtney Walsh	AMI Stadium, Christchurch	Match drawn
Test 1289	10–13 February	Ken Rutherford	Courtney Walsh	Basin Reserve, Wellington	West Indies by an innings and 322 runs

=== Pakistan in Zimbabwe ===
Test series
No.	Date	Home captain	Away captain	Venue	Result
Test 1285	31 January-4 February	Andy Flower	Saleem Malik	Harare Sports Club, Harare	Zimbabwe by an innings and 64 runs
Test 1288	7–9 February	Andy Flower	Saleem Malik	Queens Sports Club, Bulawayo	Pakistan by 8 wickets
Test 1290	15–19 February	Andy Flower	Saleem Malik	Harare Sports Club, Harare	Pakistan by 99 runs
ODI series
No.	Date	Home captain	Away captain	Venue	Result
ODI 980	22 February	Andy Flower	Saleem Malik	Harare Sports Club, Harare	Match tied
ODI 982	25 February	Andy Flower	Saleem Malik	Harare Sports Club, Harare	Pakistan by 4 wickets
ODI 984	26 February	Andy Flower	Saleem Malik	Harare Sports Club, Harare	Zimbabwe by 74 runs

== February ==
=== New Zealand Centenary Tournament 1994-95 ===
Team	P	W	L	T	NR	ARR	Points
New Zealand	3	2	1	0	0	+4.821	4
Australia	3	2	1	0	0	+4.381	4
India	3	1	2	0	0	+4.140	2
South Africa	3	1	2	0	0	+3.660	2

Group stage
No.	Date	Team 1	Captain 1	Team 2	Captain 2	Venue	Result
ODI 975	15 February	Australia	Mark Taylor	South Africa	Hansie Cronje	Basin Reserve, Wellington	Australia by 3 wickets
ODI 976	16 February	New Zealand	Ken Rutherford	India	Mohammad Azharuddin	McLean Park, Napier	New Zealand by 4 wickets
ODI 977	18 February	India	Mohammad Azharuddin	South Africa	Hansie Cronje	Seddon Park, Hamilton	South Africa by 14 runs
ODI 978	19 February	New Zealand	Ken Rutherford	Australia	Mark Taylor	Eden Park, Auckland	Australia by 27 runs
ODI 979	22 February	Australia	Mark Taylor	India	Mohammad Azharuddin	Carisbrook, Dunedin	India by 5 wickets
ODI 981	23–24 February	New Zealand	Ken Rutherford	South Africa	Hansie Cronje	AMI Stadium, Christchurch	New Zealand by 46 runs
Final
No.	Date	Team 1	Captain 1	Team 2	Captain 2	Venue	Result
ODI 983	26 February	New Zealand	Ken Rutherford	Australia	Mark Taylor	Eden Park, Auckland	Australia by 6 wickets

== March ==
=== South Africa in New Zealand ===
One-off Test
No.	Date	Home captain	Away captain	Venue	Result
Test 1291	4–8 March	Ken Rutherford	Hansie Cronje	Eden Park, Auckland	South Africa by 93 runs

=== Australia in the West Indies ===
ODI series
No.	Date	Home captain	Away captain	Venue	Result
ODI 985	8 March	Richie Richardson	Mark Taylor	Kensington Oval, Bridgetown	West Indies by 6 runs
ODI 986	11 March	Courtney Walsh	Mark Taylor	Queen's Park Oval, Port of Spain	Australia by 26 runs
ODI 987	12 March	Courtney Walsh	Mark Taylor	Queen's Park Oval, Port of Spain	West Indies by 133 runs
ODI 988	15 March	Courtney Walsh	Mark Taylor	Arnos Vale Ground, Kingstown	West Indies by 7 wickets
ODI 989	18 March	Courtney Walsh	Mark Taylor	Bourda, Georgetown	West Indies by 5 wickets
Test series
No.	Date	Home captain	Away captain	Venue	Result
Test 1294	31 March-2 April	Richie Richardson	Mark Taylor	Kensington Oval, Bridgetown	Australia by 10 wickets
Test 1295	8–13 April	Richie Richardson	Mark Taylor	Antigua Recreation Ground, St John's	Match drawn
Test 1296	21–23 April	Richie Richardson	Mark Taylor	Queen's Park Oval, Port of Spain	West Indies by 9 wickets
Test 1297	29 April-3 May	Richie Richardson	Mark Taylor	Sabina Park, Sabina Park	Australia by an innings and 53 runs

=== Sri Lanka in New Zealand ===
Test series
No.	Date	Home captain	Away captain	Venue	Result
Test 1292	11–15 March	Ken Rutherford	Arjuna Ranatunga	McLean Park, Napier	Sri Lanka by 241 runs
Test 1293	18–22 March	Ken Rutherford	Arjuna Ranatunga	Carisbrook, Dunedin	Match drawn
ODI series
No.	Date	Home captain	Away captain	Venue	Result
ODI 990	26 March	Ken Rutherford	Arjuna Ranatunga	AMI Stadium, Christchurch	New Zealand by 33 runs
ODI 991	29 March	Ken Rutherford	Arjuna Ranatunga	Seddon Park, Hamilton	New Zealand by 57 runs
ODI 992	1 April	Ken Rutherford	Arjuna Ranatunga	Eden Park, Auckland	Sri Lanka by 51 runs

== April ==
=== Asia Cup 1994-95 ===
Team	Pld	W	L	T	NR	Pts	RR
India	3	2	1	0	0	4	4.856
Sri Lanka	3	2	1	0	0	4	4.701
Pakistan	3	2	1	0	0	4	4.596
Bangladesh	3	0	3	0	0	0	2.933

Group stage
No.	Date	Team 1	Captain 1	Team 2	Captain 2	Venue	Result
ODI 993	5 April	Bangladesh	Akram Khan	India	Mohammad Azharuddin	Sharjah Cricket Stadium, Sharjah	India by 9 wickets
ODI 994	6 April	Bangladesh	Akram Khan	Sri Lanka	Arjuna Ranatunga	Sharjah Cricket Stadium, Sharjah	Sri Lanka by 107 runs
ODI 995	5 April	India	Mohammad Azharuddin	Pakistan	Moin Khan	Sharjah Cricket Stadium, Sharjah	Pakistan by 97 runs
ODI 996	8 April	Bangladesh	Akram Khan	Pakistan	Moin Khan	Sharjah Cricket Stadium, Sharjah	Pakistan by 6 wickets
ODI 997	9 April	India	Mohammad Azharuddin	Sri Lanka	Arjuna Ranatunga	Sharjah Cricket Stadium, Sharjah	India by 8 wickets
ODI 998	11 April	Pakistan	Saeed Anwar	Sri Lanka	Arjuna Ranatunga	Sharjah Cricket Stadium, Sharjah	Sri Lanka by 5 wickets
Final
No.	Date	Team 1	Captain 1	Team 2	Captain 2	Venue	Result
ODI 999	14 April	India	Mohammad Azharuddin	Sri Lanka	Arjuna Ranatunga	Sharjah Cricket Stadium, Sharjah	India by 8 wickets
