= Australian cricket team in the West Indies in 1990–91 =

International cricket tour

The Australian cricket team toured the West Indies in the 1990–91 season to play a five-match Test series against the West Indies.

The West Indies won the series 2–1 with two matches drawn. The West Indies therefore retained the Sir Frank Worrell Trophy.

== Australian squad ==
Australia had just defeated England 3–0 at home during the 1990–91 season. The team has recovered from the defeats of the mid 80s and there was hope the team could beat the West Indies in a series for the first time since 1975–76. Wisden wrote that the tour "began with exalted expectations of an epic contest between arguably the two strongest teams in the game."

The Australian squad was as follows:

- Batsmen – Allan Border (captain), Geoff Marsh (vice-captain), David Boon, Dean Jones, Mark Taylor, Mark Waugh, Steve Waugh, Mike Veletta (also back up keeper)
- Fast bowlers – Terry Alderman, Craig McDermott, Mike Whitney, Merv Hughes, Bruce Reid
- Spinners – Greg Matthews, Peter Taylor
- Wicketkeeper – Ian Healy

== Test series summary ==
The West Indies won the second and fourth tests easily. Australia won the fifth test.

=== 1st Test ===
1–6 March 1991
(5-day match)
Scorecard

West Indies	v	Australia
264 (82.3 overs); AL Logie 77* (110); CJ McDermott 5/80 (23 overs)		371 (120 overs); DC Boon 109* (243); BP Patterson 5/83 (24 overs)
334/3 (111 overs); RB Richardson 104* (233); CJ McDermott 3/48 (24 overs)

Match drawn
Sabina Park, Kingston, Jamaica
Umpires: DM Archer (WI) and SA Bucknor (WI)
Player of the match: DC Boon (AUS) and AL Logie (WI)

- West Indies won the toss and elected to bat.
- 4 March was taken as a rest day.
- There was no play on the fourth day.

=== 2nd Test ===
23–28 March 1991
(5-day match)
Scorecard

Australia	v	West Indies
348 (116.4 overs); GR Marsh 94 (224); BP Patterson 4/80 (24 overs)		569 (153.5 overs); RB Richardson 182 (260); AR Border 5/68 (30 overs)
248 (98 overs); IA Healy 47 (120); MD Marshall 3/31 (15 overs)		31/0 (7.5 overs); DL Haynes 23* (27)

West Indies won by 10 wickets
Bourda, Georgetown, Guyana
Umpires: CE Cumberbatch (WI) and CR Duncan (WI)
Player of the match: RB Richardson (WI)

- Australia won the toss and elected to bat.
- 26 March was taken as a rest day.

=== 3rd Test ===
5–10 April 1991
(5-day match)
Scorecard

Australia	v	West Indies
294 (128.1 overs); ME Waugh 64 (181); BP Patterson 4/50 (26 overs)		227 (84.2 overs); PJL Dujon 70 (178); MG Hughes 4/48 (17 overs)
123/3d (53 overs); DM Jones 39* (118); CA Walsh 1/11 (12 overs)

Match drawn
Queen's Park Oval, Port of Spain, Trinidad and Tobago
Umpires: DM Archer (WI) and LH Barker (WI)
Player of the match: PJL Dujon (WI)

- West Indies won the toss and elected to field.
- 7 April was taken as a rest day.

=== 4th Test ===
19–24 April 1991
(5-day match)
Scorecard

West Indies	v	Australia
149 (61.1 overs); IVA Richards 32 (64); MG Hughes 4/44 (16.1 overs)		134 (50.1 overs); AR Border 29 (68); CA Walsh 4/14 (5.1 overs)
536/9d (162.3 overs); CG Greenidge 226 (480); ME Waugh 4/80 (28 overs)		208 (87.2 overs); MA Taylor 76 (243); MD Marshall 3/35 (17 overs)

West Indies won by 343 runs
Kensington Oval, Bridgetown, Barbados
Umpires: DM Archer (WI) and LH Barker (WI)
Player of the match: CG Greenidge (WI)

- Australia won the toss and elected to field.
- 22 April was taken as a rest day.

=== 5th Test ===
27 April–1 May 1991
(5-day match)
Scorecard

Australia	v	West Indies
403 (108 overs); ME Waugh 139* (188); CEL Ambrose 3/92 (30 overs)		214 (55 overs); DL Haynes 84 (119); CJ McDermott 4/65 (15 overs)
265 (91.1 overs); MA Taylor 144 (281); CA Walsh 4/56 (26 overs)		297 (81.4 overs); AL Logie 61 (114); MG Hughes 2/49 (19 overs)

Australia won by 157 runs
Antigua Recreation Ground, St. John's, Antigua and Barbuda
Umpires: LH Barker (WI) and SA Bucknor (WI)
Player of the match: MA Taylor (AUS)

- Australia won the toss and elected to bat.
- 30 April was taken as a rest day.
- The match was scheduled for five days but completed in four.
- Gordon Greenidge played his last test match.

== ODI series summary ==
Australia won the Cable and Wireless Series 4–1.

=== 1st ODI ===
26 February 1991
Scorecard

Australia; 244/4 (50 overs)	v	West Indies; 209 (46 overs)
DM Jones 88* (105); CA Walsh 1/30 (7 overs)		AL Logie 65 (65); CJ McDermott 4/34 (9 overs)

Australia won by 35 runs
Sabina Park, Kingston, Jamaica
Umpires: DM Archer and SA Bucknor
Player of the match: DM Jones (AUS)

- Australia won the toss and elected to bat.

=== 2nd ODI ===
9 March 1991
Scorecard

Australia; 172/9 (34 overs)	v	West Indies; 127 (31.1 overs)
DM Jones 64 (85); AH Gray 6/50 (9 overs)		DL Haynes 45 (62); CJ McDermott 3/29 (7.1 overs)

Australia won by 45 runs
Queen's Park Oval, Port of Spain, Trinidad
Umpires: LH Barker and CE Cumberbatch
Player of the match: AH Gray (WIN)

- West Indies won the toss and elected to field.
- The match was reduced before play started from 50 to 42 overs per side.
- The match was later reduced to 34 overs per side.

=== 3rd ODI ===
10 March 1991
Scorecard

Australia; 245/7 (49 overs)	v	West Indies; 181/3 (33.3 overs)
GR Marsh 81 (118); CEL Ambrose 3/37 (10 overs)		RB Richardson 90 (98); BA Reid 1/28 (7 overs)

West Indies won by 7 wickets (run rate)
Queen's Park Oval, Port of Spain, Trinidad
Umpires: LH Barker and CE Cumberbatch
Player of the match: RB Richardson (WIN)

- Australia won the toss and elected to bat.
- Australia's innings was reduced to 49 overs.
- West Indies target was reduced to 181 runs in 36 overs (as 245 x 36/49 = 180).

=== 4th ODI ===
13 March 1991
Scorecard

Australia; 283/6 (50 overs)	v	West Indies; 246 (47 overs)
GR Marsh 113 (136); CEL Ambrose 3/38 (10 overs)		PJL Dujon 39 (41); ME Waugh 3/34 (7 overs)

Australia won by 37 runs
Kensington Oval, Bridgetown, Barbados
Umpires: DM Archer and LH Barker
Player of the match: GR Marsh (AUS)

- Australia won the toss and elected to bat.

=== 5th ODI ===
20 March 1991
Scorecard

West Indies; 251 (49.5 overs)	v	Australia; 252/4 (48.3 overs)
RB Richardson 94 (88); CJ McDermott 3/29 (10 overs)		GR Marsh 106* (158); BP Patterson 1/34 (6.3 overs)

Australia won by 6 wickets
Bourda, Georgetown, Guyana
Umpires: CE Cumberbatch and CR Duncan
Player of the match: GR Marsh (AUS)

- West Indies won the toss and elected to bat.

== Controversy ==
A book was written about the tour, Calypso Cricket by Roland Fishman, in which some Australian cricketers were quoted bragging about how many women they slept with. This was seen as a breach of the unspoken agreement between players and journalists for the latter not to report on the former's private lives, and embarrassed Greg Matthews, who was a friend of Fishman's, and who helped him get access to the players. Matthews:

Fishman lied to me. He bludged my money, my clothes, my bed and he told me he was writing a story about cricket in the Caribbean and the way of life. It was anything but that. He deceived me to the max. I haven't seen him since and next time I see him I'll be spitting in his face.
