= Gus Logie =

West Indian cricketer

Personal information
- Full name: Augustine Lawrence Logie
- Born: 28 September 1960 (age 66); Sobo, Trinidad and Tobago
- Batting: Right-handed
- Bowling: Right-arm off break

International information
- National side: West Indies (1981–1993)
- Test debut (cap 177): 23 February 1983 v India
- Last Test: 25 July 1991 v England
- ODI debut: 19 December 1981 v Pakistan
- Last ODI: 3 April 1993 v Pakistan

Domestic team information
- Years: Team
- 1978–1992: Trinidad and Tobago

Head coaching information
- Years: Team
- appointed 2003: Canada
- appointed 2004: West Indies
- appointed 2005: Bermuda
- appointed 2010: Jamaica
- appointed 2014: Trinidad and Tobago
- appointed 2019: West Indies Women

Career statistics
Competition	Tests	ODIs	FC	LA
Matches	52	158	157	188
Runs scored	2,470	2,809	7,682	3,606
Batting average	35.79	28.95	35.07	29.31
100s/50s	2/16	1/14	13/40	2/17
Top score	130	109*	171	109*
Balls bowled	7	24	289	72
Wickets	0	0	3	2
Bowling average	–	–	42.66	27.50
5 wickets in innings	0	0	0	0
10 wickets in match	0	0	0	0
Best bowling	–	–	1/2	2/1
Catches/stumpings	57/–	61/–	106/1	75/–
Medal record
Men's Cricket
Representing West Indies
ICC Cricket World Cup
Runner-up	1983 England and Wales
Representing West Indies as Coach
Winner	2004 England
- Source: ESPN Cricinfo, 18 October 2010

Augustine Lawrence Logie (born 28 September 1960), commonly known as Gus Logie, is a former West Indies and Trinidad and Tobago cricketer and is currently an international cricket coach. He coached the West Indies to win the 2004 ICC Champions Trophy, the first major world cricket title the team won since winning the 1979 Cricket World Cup. As a player, he was a part of the West Indian squad which finished as runners-up at the 1983 Cricket World Cup.

Logie played in the dominant West Indies team of the 1980s as a batsman, though he was almost equally well known as a strong fielder. He made 52 Test appearances and played in 158 One Day Internationals, scoring three international centuries.

== Career ==
Born and raised in the village of La Brea, Logie enjoyed a successful career with the Trinidad and Tobago and the West Indies. He played for T&T from 1978 to 1992 and went on to captain the side in 1990. He earned the distinction of being chosen as Man of the Match despite him neither batting or bowling in an ODI against Pakistan on 28 November 1986. Adjudicators awarded him for his three catches and two run-outs, which helped the West Indies dismiss Pakistan for 143. With this, he also became the first cricketer to win a Man of the Match award based on his fielding alone. Logie was part of the West Indies squad that finished as the losing finalists in the 1983 Cricket World Cup. He was not in the final XI for the final, although he again starred as a fielder, taking a catch as a substitute.

His 52 Test matches returned two centuries, including his career best 130 against India in April 1983. Among his most important Test innings were his scores of 81 and 95 not out against England at Lord's in 1988. These won him the Man of the Match award, and he rescued the West Indies from 54 for 5 in the first innings, setting up a victory. Logie also rescued the West Indies in the Third Test against England in 1990 when his team were 103 for 8, making 98 and helping to earn a draw when the West Indies looked likely to go 2–0 down in a series which they eventually won 2–1. The following year he was made Man of the Match again in the first Test in Jamaica of the 1990-1 series against Australia for making 77 not out, again helping to rescue the West Indies from 75 for 6, even after being forced briefly to retire hurt. He played his last Test against England at Birmingham in 1991.

During his flourishing Test career, Logie spent a successful summer in 1986 as overseas professional/coach with Scottish East League Division One outfit, Kirkcaldy Cricket Club (now defunct).

Logie coached the West Indies U-15 team to victory in the 2000 Costcutter U15 World Challenge. He then coached the Canadian cricket team during the 2003 Cricket World Cup where they defeated Bangladesh. He was thereafter appointed coach of the Windies, who eventually won the 2004 ICC Champions Trophy under his charge. After leaving the West Indies, Logie went on take over as coach of the Bermuda national cricket team. With Logie in tow, the Bermudian side qualified for the 2007 Cricket World Cup in his native West Indies. This was historic being Bermuda's first ever showing at a Cricket World Cup.

During December 2010 Logie was appointed as the coach of the Jamaican national cricket team. Logie saw the Jamaican side to win the 2011 edition of the West Indian Regional Four Day Competition.

During August 2014 Logie was appointed as the coach of the Trinidad and Tobago national cricket team. Logie eventually saw the twin island side to consecutive triumphs in the 2015 and 2016 editions of the Regional Super 50 tournament.

In 2017 Logie was appointed as the assistant coach of the West Indies women's cricket team. He was eventually named as the Windies Women head coach in 2019.

Logie was bestowed with the Trinidad and Tobago Sportsman of the Year Award in 1988. He was also honoured with the Humming Bird Medal Silver in 1993 for his service to sport in Trinidad and Tobago.
