= Bank of New Zealand Centenary Series 1994–95 =

International cricket tournament

NZ Centenary Tournament 1995
- Dates: 15 – 26 February 1995
- Administrator: International Cricket Council
- Cricket format: One Day International
- Host: New Zealand
- Champions: Australia
- Runners-up: New Zealand
- Participants: 4
- Matches: 7
- Most runs: (New Zealand) Mark Greatbatch (190)
- Most wickets: (Australia) Paul Reiffel (9)

The 1994–95 New Zealand Centenary Tournament was a quadrangular ODI cricket tournament held in February, 1995 to mark the centenary of the establishment of the New Zealand Cricket Council in Christchurch on 27 December 1894. It featured the national cricket teams of South Africa, India, Australia and the hosts New Zealand. The tournament was won by Australia, who defeated the hosts in the final.

== Points table ==
Team	P	W	L	T	NR	ARR	Points
New Zealand	3	2	1	0	0	+4.821	4
Australia	3	2	1	0	0	+4.381	4
India	3	1	2	0	0	+4.140	2
South Africa	3	1	2	0	0	+3.660	2

== Matches ==
Using the round robin format, each team played the others once. Australia defeated South Africa in the tournament opener and lost only one match in the whole tournament. Similarly, New Zealand succeeded in its opening match against India and lost only to Australia including in the final.

15 February 1995
Scorecard

South Africa; 123 (46.2 overs)	v	Australia; 124/7 (43.2 overs)
Jonty Rhodes 25 (61); Paul Reiffel 4/27 (8.2 overs)		Steve Waugh 44* (92); Hansie Cronje 2/15 (6.2 overs)

Australia won by 3 wickets
Basin Reserve, Wellington
Umpires: Brian Aldridge (NZ) and Steve Dunne (NZ)
Player of the match: Steve Waugh (AUS)

- South Africa won the toss and elected to bat.
- Ricky Ponting and Greg Blewett (AUS) made their ODI debut.

16 February 1995
Scorecard

India; 160 (45.5 overs)	v	New Zealand; 162/6 (32.2 overs)
Navjot Singh Sidhu 73 (111); Danny Morrison 3/22 (7.5 overs)		Stephen Fleming 59* (60); Javagal Srinath 4/52 (9.2 overs)

New Zealand won by 4 wickets
McLean Park, Napier
Umpires: Doug Cowie (NZ) and Christopher King (NZ)
Player of the match: Stephen Fleming (NZ)

- New Zealand won the toss and elected to field.

18 February 1995
Scorecard

South Africa; 223/6 (50 overs)	v	India; 209/9 (50 overs)
Gary Kirsten 80 (127); Anil Kumble 4/40 (10 overs)		Javagal Srinath 37 (25); Hansie Cronje 2/34 (10 overs)

South Africa won by 14 runs
Seddon Park, Hamilton
Umpires: Doug Cowie (NZ) and Evan Watkin (NZ)
Player of the match: Gary Kirsten (SA)

- South Africa won the toss and elected to bat.

19 February 1995
Scorecard

Australia; 254/5 (50 overs)	v	New Zealand; 227/9 (50 overs)
Mark Taylor 97 (128); Chris Pringle 2/54 (10 overs)		Mark Greatbatch 74 (93); Paul Reiffel 3/35 (10 overs)

Australia won by 27 runs
Eden Park, Auckland
Umpires: Doug Cowie (NZ) and Dave Quested (NZ)
Player of the match: Mark Taylor (AUS)

- Australia won the toss and elected to bat.

22 February 1995
Scorecard

Australia; 250/6 (50 overs)	v	India; 252/5 (47.5 overs)
Ricky Ponting 62 (92); Javagal Srinath 2/49 (9 overs)		Navjot Singh Sidhu 54 (70); Jo Angel 2/47 (10 overs)

India won by 5 wickets
Carisbrook, Dunedin
Umpires: Steve Dunne (NZ) and Christopher King (NZ)
Player of the match: Navjot Singh Sidhu (Ind)

- Australia won the toss and elected to bat.
- Prashant Vaidya and Aashish Kapoor (India) made their ODI debut.

23–24 February 1995
Scorecard

New Zealand; 249/7 (50 overs)	v	South Africa; 203 (47 overs)
Mark Greatbatch 76 (85); Craig Matthews 3/49 (10 overs)		Gary Kirsten 63 (92); Justin Vaughan 3/37 (10 overs)

New Zealand won by 46 runs
Lancaster Park, Christchurch
Umpires: Brian Aldridge (NZ) and Dave Quested (NZ)
Player of the match: Mark Greatbatch (NZ)

- South Africa won the toss and elected to field.
- Reserve day used. No play first day.

=== Final ===
26 February 1995
Scorecard

New Zealand; 137/9 (50 overs)	v	Australia; 138/4 (31.1 overs)
Ken Rutherford 46 (92); Tim May 3/19 (10 overs)		Mark Waugh 46 (47); Justin Vaughan 1/18 (6 overs)

Australia won by 6 wickets
Eden Park, Auckland
Umpires: Steve Dunne (NZ) and Brian Aldridge (NZ)
Player of the match: Tim May (AUS)

- New Zealand won the toss and elected to bat.
