= List of international cricket centuries by David Boon =

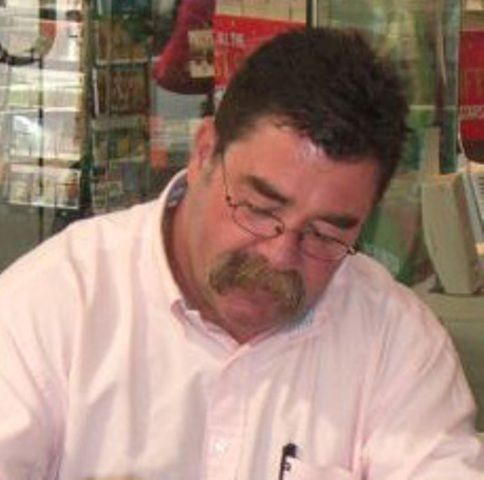
Boon scored 26 international centuries for Australia

David Boon is a former international cricketer who represented Australia between 1984 and 1996. A right-handed batsman who primarily played as an opener, Boon took part in 107 Test matches and 181 One Day Internationals (ODIs) for his country and scored centuries (100 or more runs in a single innings) on twenty-one and five occasions respectively.

Boon made his Test and ODI debuts against the West Indies in 1984. He made his first Test century in December 1985, when he scored 123 against India at the Adelaide Oval. He achieved his highest Test score in 1989, when he made 200—his solitary double-century—against New Zealand at the WACA Ground, Perth. Boon scored three centuries in three consecutive Tests, against India during the 1991–92 home series; he achieved the feat once more in the 1993 Ashes series. His accomplishments with the bat during the 1993 English cricket season led to Wisden naming him as one of their Cricketers of the Year in 1994 and describing him as "the most assured batsman in the Australian team". As of 2017, Boon is ninth (with Neil Harvey) in the list of leading Test century-makers for Australia. He scored centuries against six different opponents, including six outside Australia. He was most successful against England, scoring seven Test centuries; six of his Test centuries came against India.

Boon's first ODI century came against India at the Sawai Mansingh Stadium, Jaipur in September 1986. His highest score in ODI cricket was against Sri Lanka during the 1987–88 World Series Cup when he scored 122 at the Adelaide Oval. He was most successful against India, accumulating two ODI centuries. As of 2017, he holds fourteenth position with Damien Martyn in the list of ODI century-makers for Australia.

== Key ==
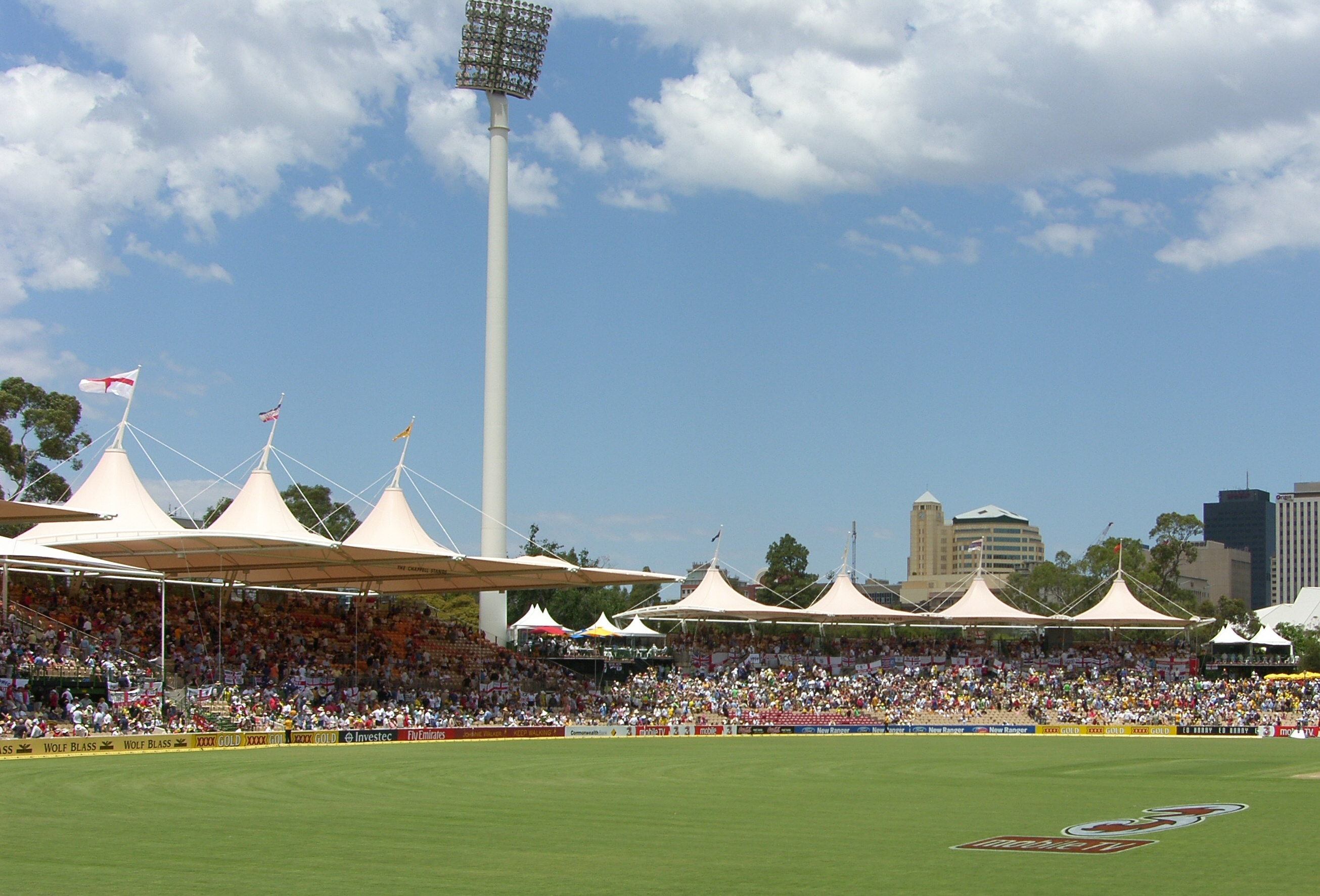
Boon made five of his international centuries at the Adelaide Oval.

Key
Symbol	Meaning
*	Remained not out
‡	Man of the match
Pos.	Position in the batting order
Balls	Balls faced
Inn.	The innings of the match
Test	The number of the Test match played in that series
S/R.	Strike rate during the innings
H/A/N	Venue was at home (Australia), away or neutral.
Date	Date the match was held, or the starting date of match for Test matches
Lost	The match was lost by Australia.
Won	The match was won by Australia.
Drawn	The match was drawn.
Tied	The match result was a Tie.

== Test cricket centuries ==
Test centuries scored by David Boon
No.	Score	Against	Pos.	Inn.	Test	Venue	H/A/N	Date	Result	Ref
1	123	India	2	1	1/3	Adelaide Oval, Adelaide	Home	13 December 1985	Drawn	
2	131	India	1	2	3/3	Sydney Cricket Ground, Sydney	Home	2 January 1986	Drawn	
3	122	India	1	1	1/3	MA Chidambaram Stadium, Madras	Away	18 September 1986	Tied	
4	103	England	2	1	3/5	Adelaide Oval, Adelaide	Home	12 December 1986	Drawn	
5	143 ‡	New Zealand	2	2	1/3	Brisbane Cricket Ground, Brisbane	Home	4 December 1987	Won	
6	184* ‡	England	1	3	1/1	Sydney Cricket Ground, Sydney	Home	29 January 1988	Drawn	
7	149	West Indies	3	2	4/5	Sydney Cricket Ground, Sydney	Home	26 January 1989	Won	
8	200	New Zealand	2	1	1/1	WACA Ground, Perth	Home	24 November 1989	Won	
9	121	England	3	3	4/5	Adelaide Oval, Adelaide	Home	25 January 1991	Drawn	
10	109* ‡	West Indies	3	2	1/5	Sabina Park, Kingston	Away	1 March 1991	Drawn	
11	129*	India	3	1	3/5	Sydney Cricket Ground, Sydney	Home	2 January 1992	Drawn	
12	135	India	3	3	4/5	Adelaide Oval, Adelaide	Home	25 January 1992	Won	
13	107	India	3	1	5/5	WACA Ground, Perth	Home	1 February 1992	Won	
14	111 ‡	West Indies	1	3	1/6	Brisbane Cricket Ground, Brisbane	Home	27 November 1992	Drawn	
15	164*	England	3	1	2/6	Lord's Cricket Ground, London	Away	17 June 1993	Won	
16	101	England	3	2	3/6	Trent Bridge, Nottingham	Away	1 July 1993	Drawn	
17	107	England	3	1	4/6	Headingley, Leeds	Away	22 July 1993	Won	
18	106	New Zealand	3	1	2/3	Bellerive Oval, Hobart	Home	26 November 1993	Won	
19	114*	Pakistan	3	3	1/3	National Stadium, Karachi	Away	28 September 1994	Lost	
20	131	England	3	3	2/4	Melbourne Cricket Ground, Melbourne	Home	24 December 1994	Won	
21	110	Sri Lanka	3	1	2/3	Melbourne Cricket Ground, Melbourne	Home	26 December 1995	Won	

== One Day International centuries ==
ODI centuries scored by David Boon
No.	Score	Balls	Against	Pos.	Inn.	S/R	Venue	H/A/N	Date	Result	Ref
1	111	118	India	2	1	94.06	Sawai Mansingh Stadium, Jaipur	Away	7 September 1986	Lost	
2	122 ‡	130	Sri Lanka	2	1	93.84	Adelaide Oval, Adelaide	Home	10 January 1988	Won	
3	102* ‡	168	India	1	2	60.71	Bellerive Oval, Hobart	Home	10 December 1991	Won	
4	100	133	New Zealand	1	2	75.18	Eden Park, Auckland	Away	22 February 1992	Lost	
5	100 ‡	147	West Indies	2	1	68.02	Melbourne Cricket Ground, Melbourne	Home	18 March 1992	Won	
