= Mark Taylor (cricketer) =

Australian cricketer and commentator

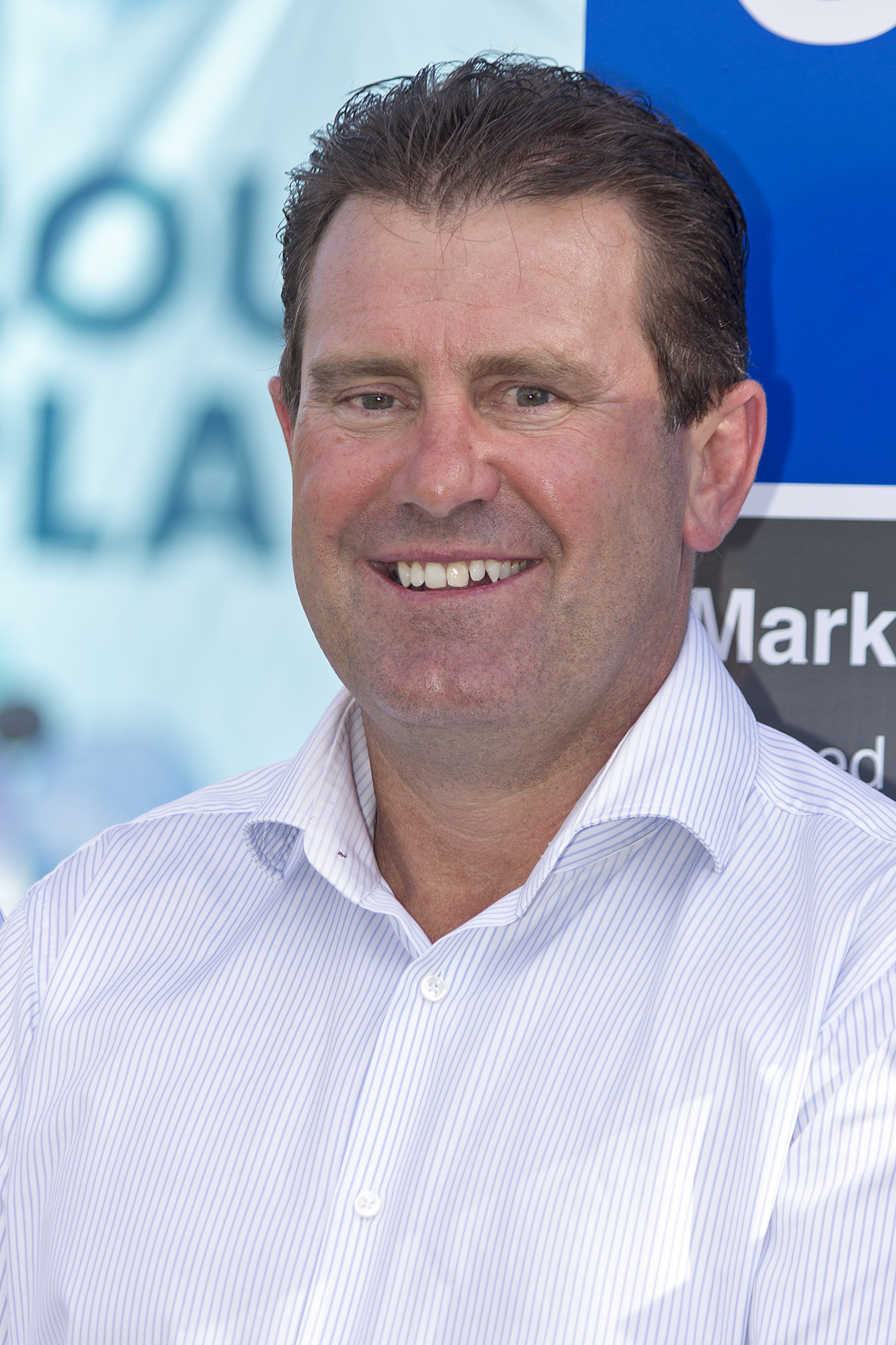
- Taylor in 2014

Personal information
- Full name: Mark Anthony Taylor
- Born: 27 October 1964 (age 62); Leeton, New South Wales, Australia
- Nickname: Tubby, Tubs
- Height: 180 cm (5 ft 11 in)
- Batting: Left-handed
- Bowling: Right-arm leg spin
- Role: Opening batter

International information
- National side: Australia (1989–1999)
- Test debut (cap 346): 26 January 1989 v West Indies
- Last Test: 2 January 1999 v England
- ODI debut (cap 107): 26 December 1989 v Sri Lanka
- Last ODI: 24 May 1997 v England

Domestic team information
- Years: Team
- 1985/86–1998/99: New South Wales

Career statistics
Competition	Test	ODI	FC	LA
Matches	104	113	253	178
Runs scored	7,525	3,514	17,415	5,463
Batting average	43.49	32.23	41.96	31.57
100s/50s	19/40	1/28	41/97	1/47
Top score	334*	105	334*	105
Balls bowled	42	–	150	18
Wickets	1	–	2	0
Bowling average	26.00	–	38.50	–
5 wickets in innings	0	–	0	–
10 wickets in match	0	–	0	–
Best bowling	1/11	–	1/4	–
Catches/stumpings	157/0	56/0	350/0	98/0
Medal record
Men's Cricket
Representing Australia
ICC Cricket World Cup
Runner-up	1996 India-Pakistan-Sri Lanka
- Source: ESPNcricinfo, 1 September 2007

Mark Anthony Taylor (born 27 October 1964) is a former Australian cricketer and current Nine Network commentator. He was the captain of the Australian squad which finished as runners-up at the 1996 Cricket World Cup.

He was Test opening batsman from 1988 to 1999, as well as captain from 1994 to 1999, succeeding Allan Border. His predominant fielding position was first slip. He was widely regarded as an instrumental component in Australia's rise to Test cricket dominance, and his captaincy was regarded as adventurous and highly effective. However, he was considered less than ideal for One-Day International cricket and was eventually dropped as one-day captain after a 0–3 drubbing at the hands of England in 1997.

He moved to Wagga Wagga in 1972 and played for Lake Albert Cricket Club. His debut was for New South Wales in 1985.

He retired from Test cricket on 2 February 1999. In 104 Test matches, he scored 7,525 runs with a batting average of 43.49, including 19 centuries and 40 fifties. He was also an excellent first slip – his 157 catches, at the time, a Test record (now held by Joe Root). In contrast to his predecessor Allan Border, who acquired the nickname 'Captain Grumpy', Taylor won plaudits for his always cheerful and positive demeanour. His successor, Steve Waugh, further honed the Australian team built by Border and Taylor and went on to set numerous records for victories as captain. Having been named Australian of the Year in 1999, he is now a cricket commentator for the Nine Network, and former Director of Cricket Australia.

== Early years ==
The second of three children born to bank manager Tony Taylor, and his wife Judy, Mark Taylor's early years were spent at Wagga Wagga, where his family relocated when he was eight. His father had a sporting background, playing first grade rugby in Newcastle. The young Taylor also enjoyed Rugby, alongside his main preference, cricket. He learned to bat in the family garage, with his father throwing cork balls to him. Taylor idolised Arthur Morris, the left-handed opening batsman from New South Wales who led the aggregates on the 1948 "Invincibles" tour of England.

Taylor played for his primary school as an opening batsman, and made his first century at the age of thirteen for the Lake Albert club at Bolton Park in Wagga. His family then moved to the north shore of Sydney, where he joined Northern District in Sydney Grade Cricket. Completing his secondary education at Chatswood High School, he later obtained a degree in surveying at the University of New South Wales in 1987. Along with the Waugh twins, Steve and Mark, Taylor played in under-19 youth internationals for Australia against Sri Lanka in 1982–83.

Taylor made his Sheffield Shield debut in 1985–86 when NSW was depleted by the defection of regular openers Steve Smith and John Dyson to a rebel tour of South Africa. Opening with fellow debutant Mark Waugh, he scored 12 and 56 not out against Tasmania. His first season was highlighted by home and away centuries against South Australia in a total of 937 runs at 49.31 average. He had a lean season in 1987–88, after which he spent the English summer with Greenmount, helping them to win their first Bolton League title by scoring more than 1,300 runs at an average of 70.

== International career ==
=== Test career ===
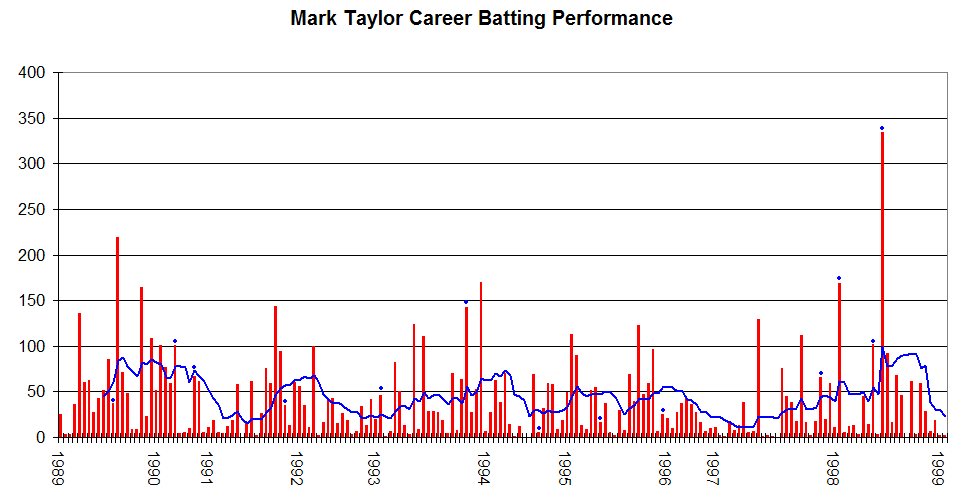
Mark Taylor's career performance graph.

Solid form for NSW in 1988–89 resulted in Taylor's selection for his Test debut in the Fourth Test against the West Indies at the SCG, replacing middle-order batsman Graeme Wood. For three years, the opening combination of Geoff Marsh and David Boon had been successful for Australia. However, team coach Bob Simpson wanted a left and right-handed opening combination, and stability added to the middle order. Therefore, the left-handed Taylor partnered the right-handed Marsh, while Boon batted at number three. Taylor's safe catching at slip was also a factor in his selection. He made 25 and 3 in a winning team, then was run out twice in the Fifth Test. A first-class aggregate of 1,241 runs (at 49.64 average) for the season earned him a place on the 1989 Ashes tour.

=== Record-breaking start ===
Beginning with a century at Headingley in his First Test against England, Taylor amassed 839 runs at 83.90 in the six Tests: the second best aggregate in an Ashes series in England, behind Don Bradman's 974 runs in 1930. He occupied the crease for a total of 38 hours, more than six full days of play. The highlight of his tour was the Fifth Test at Trent Bridge when he and Geoff Marsh became the first pair to bat throughout a day's play of Test cricket in England, amassing 301 runs. Taylor made 219 in a partnership of 329, an Ashes record. He finished with 71 and 48 in the Sixth Test to overtake Neil Harvey for the third-highest series aggregate in Test history and totalled 1,669 first-class runs for the tour. Australia won the series 4–0 to regain the Ashes. However, Taylor was overlooked for selection in the ODIs.

Returning to Australia, Taylor made 1,403 first-class runs at 70.15 during the 1989–90 season, and ended 1989 with 1,219 Test runs, thus becoming the first player to better one thousand Test runs in his debut calendar year, something only matched twice since by England opener Alastair Cook and Australian Adam Voges. In Taylor's first nine Tests, Australia passed 400 in the first innings. He scored centuries in successive Tests against Sri Lanka, and against Pakistan his scores were 52 and 101 at the MCG, 77 and 59 at the Adelaide Oval and an unbeaten 101 at Sydney. Australia won both series 1–0. In just over twelve months, he had amassed 1,618 runs at 70.35. This outstanding start to his career earned Taylor nomination as one of the five Wisden Cricketers of the Year in 1990. At the season's end, he demonstrated his leadership abilities for the first time. Standing in as NSW captain in place of the injured Geoff Lawson for the 1989–90 Sheffield Shield final in Sydney, Taylor scored 127 and 100. NSW won by 345 runs to secure its 40th title.

A year after his Test debut, Taylor was selected to make his ODI debut, which came on Boxing Day of 1989 against Sri Lanka. He made 11 as Australia won by 30 runs. He was selected for nine of Australia's ten ODIs for the season's triangular tournament, scoring 294 runs at 32.66 with two half-centuries. His highest score of 76 came as Australia defeated Pakistan by 69 runs to clinch the finals series in Sydney. The season ended with ODI tournaments in New Zealand and Sharjah. He played six of the eight matches, scoring 222 runs at 37.00 with two half-centuries, but was dropped for the final in New Zealand.

=== Inconsistent form ===
Taylor experienced a slump during the 1990–91 Ashes series. After making two-half centuries in the first two Tests, he failed to pass 20 in the last three and finished with 213 runs at 23.66 in a team that won 3–0. He found himself on the outer for the ODI triangular tournament, missing all eight of the preliminary matches before returning to score 41 and 71 as Australia won the finals 2–0.

His moderate form continued during the 1991 tour of the West Indies, where he was selected in only two of the five ODIs, scoring three and five. He ended the run with a rear-guard innings of 76 in the second innings of the Fourth Test at Barbados. Despite his effort, Australia lost and the West Indies took an unassailable lead of 2–0. In the Fifth Test St. Johns, Antigua, Australia gained a consolation victory due mainly to Taylor's scores of 59 and 144 (out of a total of 265). This late rush of form boosted his average for the series to 49. In late 1991, before the Australian season started, Taylor was appointed to lead an Australia A team to tour Zimbabwe. The team was composed of younger Test players and other young players who were seeking to break into international cricket. The selectors were attempting to groom Taylor as a potential replacement for Border.

During the 1991–92 Australian season, Taylor batted consistently in a 4–0 series victory over India. He scored 94 and 35* in a ten-wicket win at Brisbane. He scored half-centuries in each of the next two Tests before striking 100 in the second innings of the Fourth Test at Adelaide. It helped Australia to wipe out a first innings deficit of 80 and set up a winning target. His opening partner Marsh was dropped for the Fifth Test, so the selectors elevated Taylor to the vice-captaincy of the team. Over the next twelve months, a number of players were tried as Taylor's opening partner. Taylor struggled in his first match with new partner Wayne N. Phillips, scoring two and 16. Nevertheless, he had scored 422 runs at 46.89. Taylor continued to be overlooked by the selectors in the shorter version of the game, missing selection for all of the season's triangular tournament. He was selected for the squad for the 1992 Cricket World Cup held on home soil, and after Australia lost its first two matches, Taylor was recalled for his first ODI in 12 months. He made 13 as Australia beat India by one run, but scored his first ODI duck in the next match as England won by eight wickets. He was dropped for the remainder of the tournament.

On the 1992 tour of Sri Lanka, Taylor struggled in scoring 148 runs at 24.67. After scoring 42 and 43 in Australia's win in the First Test, Taylor failed to again pass 30. With new opening partner Tom Moody also struggling with 71 runs at 11.83, Australia frequently struggled at the top of their innings. He played in all three ODIs, scoring 138 runs at 46.00. His 94 in the first match was his highest score in ODIs to that point.

Against the West Indies in 1992–93, Taylor was now opening alongside David Boon with Moody having been dropped. Taylor was ineffective and failed to pass fifty in the first four Tests. After Australia failed by one run to win the Fourth Test and thus the series, Taylor was dropped for the deciding Test at Perth, having failed to make double figures in either innings. In his absence, Australia lost by an innings in three days and conceded the series 1–2. He had scored 170 runs at 24.29 for the series. However, he played all of Australia's ten ODIs, scoring 286 runs at 28.60 with two half-centuries.

=== Taylor and Slater ===
As a result of the innings defeat in Perth, Taylor was immediately recalled for the tour of New Zealand, where he scored 82 in the First Test at Christchurch to help Australia to an innings victory. He then scored 50 in the drawn Second Test and bowled for the first time at Test level, taking 0/15. He failed to pass 20 in the Third Test and ended the series with 148 runs at 37.00 as the home team squared the series. Australia then played five ODIs in New Zealand before starting the England tour with three more. Taylor played in all eight, scoring 307 runs at 38.38 with four half-centuries.

The problem of finding him a long-term partner was solved on the tour of England that followed. NSW batsman Michael Slater, who also grew up in Wagga Wagga, made his debut in the First Test of the 1993 Ashes series. In the First Test at Old Trafford, Taylor made 124 after an opening partnership of 128, as Australia managed only 289 after being sent in. Australia managed to scrape out a lead of 79, before going on to a 179-run win.

This was followed by a stand of 260 at Lord's in the Second Test, with Taylor making 111. In the process, he passed 1000 Test runs against England and the partnership broke the Ashes partnership record at Lord's, which had been set by Bill Woodfull and Don Bradman in 1930. The partnership laid the platform for Australia's total of 4/632, as the tourists proceeded to an innings victory.

His scoring was more sedate in the remaining Tests as Australia won 4–1, and he finished with 428 runs at 42.80. He passed 30 only once more, with 70 in the first innings of the Sixth Test at The Oval.

Against New Zealand in 1993–94, Taylor made 64 and 142 not out in the First Test at Perth, which ended in a draw. He then scored 27 and 53 as Australia won the next two Tests by an innings, totalling 286 runs at 95.33 in three Tests as Australia won 2–0. In the rain-affected Boxing Day Test at the Melbourne Cricket Ground, Taylor played his 50th Test and celebrated with 170 against South Africa, the first Test between the two countries since 1970. This made him the first batsman to score centuries on Test debut against four countries. In addition, he passed 4,000 Test runs during the innings. Taylor had scored more than 1,000 Test runs for the calendar year, ending with 1106 runs Taylor scored 62 in the Third Test, his only other half-century for the series, which he ended with 304 runs at 60.80.

On the reciprocal tour of South Africa at the end of the season, Taylor missed a Test because of injury for the only time in his career. Matthew Hayden filled in for the First Test in Johannesburg, which Australia lost. On his return for the Second Test at Cape Town, he scored 70 and ended the series with 97 runs at 24.25. Both series were drawn 1–1.

=== Captaincy ===
After the retirement of Allan Border, Taylor was appointed captain.

Frequently omitted from the ODI team due to slow scoring, Taylor missed the finals of the ODI series in Australia against South Africa. On the tour of South Africa, he missed three consecutive ODIs when tour selectors and fellow players Ian Healy and Steve Waugh voted him off the team. In all, Taylor had only played in 11 of Australia's 19 ODIs for the season, scoring 281 runs at 25.55. Taylor requested an extended trial as opener for the ODI team to help consolidate his captaincy of both teams.

Taylor started his ODI captaincy with two tournaments in Sharjah and Sri Lanka. Australia missed the finals in both tournaments, winning three of their six matches. After scoring 68* to guide his team to a nine-wicket win in the first match against Sri Lanka in Sharjah, Taylor's form tapered off, scoring only 64 more runs to end the two tournaments with a total of 132 runs at 33.00.

His first task was a tour of Pakistan in 1994, where Australia had not won a Test since the 1959 tour. To make matters worse, Australia's first-choice pace pairing of Craig McDermott and Merv Hughes missed the tour due to injury. The First Test at Karachi was a personal disaster for Taylor as he scored a pair, the first player in Test history to do so on his captaincy debut. Paceman Glenn McGrath then broke down in the middle of the match. Australia was in the box seat with Pakistan needing 56 runs with one wicket in hand, but lost by one wicket after Ian Healy missed a stumping opportunity and the ball went for the winning runs. Recovering to score 69 in the Second Test at Rawalpindi, Taylor forced Pakistan to follow on after taking a 261-run lead. However, he dropped Pakistan captain Salim Malik when he was on 20. Malik went on to make 237 as Pakistan made 537 and saved the Test. Australia again took a first innings lead in the Third Test, but could not force a result, as Malik scored another second innings century to ensure safety and a 1–0 series win. Taylor ended the series with 106 runs at 26.50. Australia fared better in the ODI triangular tournament, winning five of their six matches. Taylor scored 56 in the final as Australia beat Pakistan by 64 runs to end the tournament with 193 runs at 32.16.

Beginning the 1994–95 season with 150 for NSW in a tour match against England, Taylor followed up with 59 in an opening stand of 97 as Australia made 426 in the first innings to take the initiative in the First Test in Brisbane. Australia amassed a 259-run first innings lead, but Taylor, mindful of the Test match at Rawalpindi, became the first Australian captain since 1977–78 to not enforce the follow-on. Although heavily criticised as a conservative decision, Australia still won the match by 184 runs, with Taylor adding 58 in the second innings. Having scored the first win of his Test captaincy, Taylor led his team to a 295-run win in the Second Test.

Taylor played his best cricket of the summer in the Third Test at Sydney. Last man out for 49 in a total of 116 in the first innings, he defied a pitch that had begun to seam and swing after a shower and cloud cover as Australia narrowly avoided the follow on. In the second innings, he made a bold attempt at chasing a world record target of 449 by scoring 113, but Australia played for a draw after Slater and Taylor fell following a double-century stand. Australia collapsed to 7/292 before hanging on in near-darkness. In the final two Tests, he scored half-centuries as Australia won 3–1. Australia dramatically lost the Fourth Test when England led by only 154 on the final day with four wickets in hand. Aggressive lower order batting saw Australia set 263 in just over two sessions, but a heavy collapse saw Australia eight wickets down with more than 2 hours to play. Almost two hours of resistance later, England took a 106-run win late in the day. However, Australia bounced back to win the Fifth Test by 329 runs, the largest margin of the series. Taylor's partnership with Slater yielded three century opening stands at an average of 76.60 for the series and Taylor's individual return was 471 runs at 47.10.

The southern hemisphere summer ended with a quadrangular tournament in New Zealand, where Australia won two of their three group matches to proceed to the final. Taylor scored 44 in a six-wicket triumph over New Zealand and totalled 165 runs at 41.25. His best score was 97 against the hosts in the preliminary round meant that he was still yet to post his first ODI century, five years after his debut.

=== Caribbean tour 1995 ===
This victory was followed by the 1995 tour of the West Indies, where Australia had not won a Test series for 22 years. Australia lost the ODI series which preceded the Tests 1–4, with Taylor making 152 runs at 30.40. The difficulty of Australia's task was increased when fast bowlers Craig McDermott and Damien Fleming went home injured at the start of the tour. Australia fielded a pace attack of Glenn McGrath, Brendon Julian and Paul Reiffel who had played only 23 Tests between them. Despite this, Australia won by ten wickets in the first Test at Barbados, with Taylor contributing a half-century. After the Second Test was a rained-out draw, the West Indies beat Australia inside three days on a "green" Trinidad pitch in the Third Test. Australia regained the Frank Worrell Trophy with an innings victory in the Fourth Test at Jamaica, with Taylor taking the winning catch from the bowling of Shane Warne. Although he only managed 153 runs (at 25.50 average) for the series, Taylor held nine catches and his leadership was cited as a key factor in the result.

=== Controversy with Sri Lanka ===
This was followed by two and three-Test series against Pakistan and Sri Lanka respectively in the 1995–96 Australian season. The Pakistan series began among a media circus when Salim Malik arrived with publicity focused on the bribery allegations which had surfaced a year earlier. Australia won the First Test in Brisbane by an innings in three and a half days, with Taylor contributing 69. In the Second Test at Bellerive Oval, Taylor scored 123 in the second innings to set up a winning total. In the Third Test in Sydney, he made 59 as Australia collapsed for 172 in the second innings and conceded the match. He ended the series with a healthy 338 runs at 67.60.

The subsequent Test and ODI series involving Sri Lanka were overshadowed by a series of spiteful clashes. The Tests were won 3–0 by the Australians with heavy margins of an innings, ten wickets and 148 runs respectively. Taylor's highlight being a 96 in the First Test at Perth as he compiled 159 runs at 39.75. He also made his 100th Test catch during the series. After accusations of ball tampering were levelled against the tourists in the First Test, leading spinner Muttiah Muralitharan was no-balled seven times in the Second Test, and during the ODI series, the Sri Lankans accused Taylor's men of cheating. The season hit a low point with the Sri Lankans which saw the teams refuse to shake hands at the end of the second final of the triangular series which Australia won 2–0. The match had included physical jostling between McGrath and Sanath Jayasuriya mid pitch, with the latter accusing McGrath of making racist attacks. Later in the match, stump microphones showed Australian wicketkeeper Ian Healy alleging that portly Sri Lankan captain Arjuna Ranatunga was feigning injury and calling for a runner because of his lack of physical fitness.

On the field, the ODI tournament saw Mark Waugh elevated to be Taylor's ODI opening partner after the axing of Slater midway through the season. In their first match together in Perth, the pair put on 189, with Taylor scoring 85. They put on another century stand in the second final, with Taylor scoring 82. Taylor scored heavily in the ODI tournament, with 423 runs at 42.30 with four half-centuries. Australia warmed up for the 1996 Cricket World Cup by winning five of their eight round-robin matches, and taking the finals 2–0, but many of the matches were closely contested. The finals were won by 18 and nine runs respectively, while three of the group matches were decided in the last over.

After the spiteful summer, a Tamil Tiger bombing in Colombo coupled with death threats to some members of the team forced Taylor to forfeit his team's scheduled World Cup match against Sri Lanka in Colombo. Taylor made six as Australia started their campaign with a 97-run win over Kenya. He then made 59 in a century stand with Waugh as Australia defeated co-hosts India in Mumbai. Taylor scored 34 in a nine-wicket win over Zimbabwe, before scoring nine in a defeat to the West Indies in the last group match. Australia finished second in their group and faced New Zealand in the quarter-finals. Taylor made only 10 as Australia chased 289 for victory, but made a surprise tactic by sending in Shane Warne as a pinch hitter. Warne made 24 from 15 balls in a partnership with Waugh, to allow Australia to take the momentum and take victory by six wickets. Taylor managed only one in the semi-final as Australia staggered to 8/207 against the West Indies. Australia appeared to be heading out of the tournament when the Caribbean team reached 2/165, but a sudden collapse saw Australia win by six runs in the last over.

Australia managed to reach the final, where they met Sri Lanka. Taylor scored 74, a record score by an Australian captain in the World Cup, but Sri Lanka comfortably triumphed on this occasion by seven wickets to claim the trophy.

=== Almost retired ===
After the World Cup, Bob Simpson was replaced as Australia's coach by Geoff Marsh, Taylor's former opening partner. Australia's first tournament after the World Cup was the Singer World Series in Sri Lanka. Taylor opted out of the tournament, and in his absence, Australia reached the final but lost by 50 runs to the hosts.

On a short tour to India, Taylor made his first ODI century at Bangalore, with 105 against India in his 98th match, having been out in the 90s on three previous occasions. Taylor performed strongly in the ODIs, with a total of 302 runs at 60.40. However, it was a disappointing tour for the team; the solitary Test in Delhi was lost, as were all five ODIs played during the Titan Cup.

In 1996–97, Australia confirmed its ascendancy over the West Indies with a 3–2 series win, but Taylor endured a poor season with the bat and failed to pass 50 in nine innings. His partnership with Slater was terminated when the latter was dropped, replaced by Matthew Elliott. Following an injury to Elliott, Matthew Hayden became Taylor's partner for three Tests.

Unable to recover form in the ODI series, Taylor's scratchy batting led to many poor starts for Australia. The team suffered five consecutive defeats, and missed the finals of the tournament for the first time in 17 years. Taylor managed only 143 runs at 17.88 with a highest score of 29.

The early 1997 tour to South Africa brought no upturn in Taylor's batting despite Australia's 2–1 victory in the series: he scored 80 runs at 16.00. His form was such that it influenced the selection of the team. For the Second Test at Port Elizabeth, played on a green pitch, Australia played Michael Bevan as a second spinner batting at number seven to reinforce the batting, instead of a third seamer to exploit the conditions. After scoring seven and 17 in the first two ODIs, Taylor dropped himself from the team for the remaining five matches.

The 1997 Ashes tour started poorly amid rumours that Taylor was on the verge of losing his place in the team. He batted ineffectively as Australia lost the one day series 0–3, scoring seven and 11, before dropping himself for the final match. In the First Test, Australia were dismissed for 118 in the first innings, with Taylor contributing seven: he had not managed to pass 50 in his last 21 Test innings. England amassed a big lead of 360 runs. With Australia facing a heavy defeat, media criticism of his position intensified. The Melbourne Age ran a competition for its readers to forecast how many runs he would make. Most respondents guessed less than 10 runs. The team's erstwhile coach, Bob Simpson, said that Taylor's retention in the team in spite of his poor form was fostering resentment among the players and destabilising the team.

Taylor started nervously in the second innings, but went on to score of 129, which saved his career, but not the match. His performance prompted personal congratulations from Prime Minister John Howard and the team's management allowed the media a rare opportunity to enter the dressing room and interview Taylor. During the period he refused offers by the manager to handle the media on his behalf. Australia went on to win the Third, Fourth and Fifth Tests and retain the Ashes 3–2. Although Taylor made single figures in the three Tests following his century, he contributed 76 and 45 in the series-clinching Test at Nottingham. Taylor ended the series with 317 runs at 31.7.

=== Dual teams ===
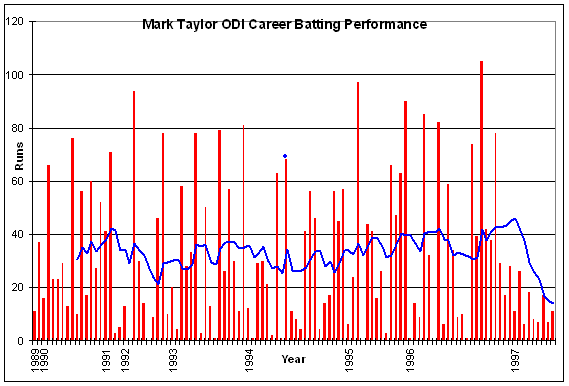
Taylor's ODI career batting performance.

However, Taylor's ODI form was not to the satisfaction of the selectors. At the start of the 1997–98 season, a new selection policy was announced: the Test and ODI teams became separate entities, with specialists in each form of the game selected accordingly. Taylor was dropped from the ODI team, in favour of the aggressive Michael di Venuto. Tactically, ODI cricket was transformed by Sri Lanka's World Cup success, when it employed the highly aggressive opening pair of Sanath Jayasuriya and Romesh Kaluwitharana.

At this time, Taylor was a central figure in a pay dispute between the players and the ACB, with a strike action threatened by the players. Taylor continued as Test captain and led the team to a 2–0 win over New Zealand. The first two matches were won by 186 runs and an innings, while the Third Test ended with Australia one wicket from victory after almost two days' play was washed out. Taylor scored a century (112 on the first day of the First Test, and an unbeaten 66 in the Third Test, compiling 214 runs at 53.50 for the series. This was followed by three Tests against South Africa. After South Africa withheld the Australian bowling on the final day to secure a draw in the Boxing Day Test, Australia took a 1–0 lead in the New Year's Test at Sydney with an innings victory. Taylor carried his bat for 169 in the first innings of the Third Test at Adelaide which helped Australia to draw the match and clinch the series.

On the 1998 tour of India, Elliott was dropped and Taylor reunited with Slater as the opening pair. Australia started well by taking a 71-run first-innings lead in the First Test at Chennai, but Sachin Tendulkar's unbeaten 155 put Australia under pressure to save the match on the final day. They were unable to resist and lost by 179 runs. Australia was crushed by an innings and 219 runs in the Second Test at Calcutta, Australia first series loss in four years and the first time that Australia had lost by an innings for five years. Thus, a series victory in India, which Australia had not achieved since 1969–70, remained elusive. Australia won the Third Test in Bangalore by eight wickets, with Taylor scoring an unbeaten 102 in a second innings run chase.

=== Record equalled ===
Later in 1998, Taylor led his team to Pakistan, where a convincing win in the First Test at Rawalpindi by an innings and 99 runs was Australia's first Test victory in the country for 39 years. Taylor then attended a court hearing investigating the claims of match-fixing made during the 1994 tour. In the Second Test at Peshawar, Taylor played the longest innings of his career. He batted two days to amass 334 *, equalling Sir Donald Bradman's Australian record set in 1930. In temperatures above 32 °C, Taylor survived two dropped catches before he had reached 25 and scored slowly on the first day. He shared a 206-run partnership with Justin Langer. The next day, he added 103 runs in a morning session extended from two to three hours. After the tea interval, he discarded his helmet in favour of a white sun hat, to deal with the extreme heat. He passed 311, eclipsing Bob Simpson's record score by an Australian captain. In the final over, Taylor equalled Bradman's Australian Test record when a shot to midwicket was barely stopped by Ijaz Ahmed, which reduced the scoring opportunity to a single run.

At the end of the day's play, Taylor was encouraged by the media, the public and his teammates to attempt to break Brian Lara's world record score of 375. An unusually large crowd turned out the following day in anticipation. However, Taylor declared the innings closed, opting to share the record with Bradman, and making the team's chances of winning the game paramount. He was widely praised for this decision. He made 92 in the second innings, giving him the third highest Test match aggregate after English batsmen Graham Gooch, who scored 333 and 123 for a total of 456 against India at Lord's on 26 July 1990 and India batsman Shubman Gill, who scored 269 and 161 for a total of 430 against England at Edgbaston His fifteen hours batting in one Test was second only to Hanif Mohammad. The match ended in a draw, as did the Third Test, so Australia won the series and Taylor ended with 513 runs at 128.25 average.

=== Final season ===
Taylor's swansong was the 1998–99 Ashes series against England, which began with his 100th Test in the First Test in Brisbane. He scored 46 and a duck—his first in Australia—as England were saved when thunderstorms forced the abandonment of play on the final afternoon. Two half centuries in the next two Tests in Perth and Adelaide saw Australia win by seven wickets and 205 runs respectively, thereby retaining the series 2–0. After losing the Fourth Test by 12 runs after a dramatic final day collapse, Taylor headed to his home ground, the Sydney Cricket Ground, for what would be his final Test. Australia went on to win the Test by 98 runs and take the series 3–1. Taylor only scored two in both innings, but he broke Border's world record for the most Test catches. His catch in the first innings equalled Border's 156 and another in the second made him the sole owner of the record.

He also jointly holds the record in Test cricket (along with Ian Healy) of being the only cricketers to have been run out in both innings of a Test on two occasions.

== Legacy ==
The improvement of the Australian team, begun during Border's tenure, continued under the captaincy of Taylor. After the defeat of the West Indies in 1995, Taylor's teams won home and away series against every Test team they played, with the exception of winning a series in India. Wisden wrote:

Taylor talked so well that he raised the standard of debate in Australia—and perhaps of cricket itself—in a way which was an example to all professional cricketers ... Border stopped Australia losing. Taylor made them into winners, the acknowledged if not official world champions of Test cricket.

Taylor made a concerted effort to decrease the amount of sledging committed by his team, a trait that brought criticism of Australian teams during other eras. In total, he captained the team in 50 Tests, winning 26 and losing 13, a success rate unmatched in the previous fifty years except for Don Bradman and Viv Richards.

== International centuries ==
During his career Taylor made 20 centuries in international cricket – 19 in Test matches and one in an ODI.

=== Test cricket centuries ===
Test centuries scored by Mark Taylor
No.	Score	Opponents	Venue	Date	Result	Ref
1	136	England	Headingley, Leeds	8 June 1989	Australia won	
2	219	England	Trent Bridge, Nottingham	10 August 1989	Australia won	
3	164	Sri Lanka	Brisbane Cricket Ground	8 December 1989	Drawn	
4	108	Sri Lanka	Bellerive Oval, Hobart	16 December 1989	Australia won	
5	101	Pakistan	Melbourne Cricket Ground	12 January 1990	Drawn	
6	101*	Pakistan	Sydney Cricket Ground	3 February 1990	Australia won	
7	144	West Indies	Antigua Recreation Ground, St John's	27 April 1991	Australia won	
8	100	India	Adelaide Oval	25 January 1992	Australia won	
9	124	England	Old Trafford, Manchester	3 June 1993	Australia won	
10	111	England	Lord's, London	17 June 1993	Australia won	
11	142*	New Zealand	WACA Ground, Perth	16 November 1993	Drawn	
12	170	South Africa	Melbourne Cricket Ground	26 December 1993	Drawn	
13	113	England	Sydney Cricket Ground	1 January 1995	Drawn	
14	123	Pakistan	Bellerive Oval, Hobart	17 November 1995	Australia won	
15	129	England	Edgbaston Cricket Ground, Birmingham	5 June 1997	Australia lost	
16	112	New Zealand	Brisbane Cricket Ground	7 November 1997	Australia won	
17	169*	South Africa	Adelaide Oval	30 January 1998	Drawn	
18	102*	India	M. Chinnaswamy Stadium, Bengaluru	25 March 1998	Australia won	
19	334*	Pakistan	Arbab Niaz Stadium, Peshawar	15 October 1998	Drawn	

=== One Day International centuries ===
ODI centuries scored by Mark Taylor
No.	Score	Opponents	Venue	Date	Result	Ref
1	105	India	M. Chinnaswamy Stadium, Bengaluru	21 October 1996	Lost	

== Career best performances ==
	Batting			
	Score	Fixture	Venue	Season
Test	334*	Pakistan v Australia	Arbab Niaz Stadium, Peshawar	1998
ODI	105	India v Australia	M. Chinnaswamy Stadium, Bangalore	1996
FC	334*	Pakistan v Australia	Arbab Niaz Stadium, Peshawar	1998
LA	105	India v Australia	M. Chinnaswamy Stadium, Bangalore	1996

== Retirement ==
Taylor retired from professional cricket in early 1999 after the Ashes series. On Australia Day, he was named the Australian of the Year. He was awarded an Australian Sports Medal in 2000 and a Centenary Medal in 2001. He was inducted into the Sport Australia Hall of Fame in 2002 and made an Officer of the Order of Australia in 2003. In 2011, he was inducted into the Cricket Hall of Fame by the CA.

He is now a commentator for Channel Nine for 21 years. Despite the network losing the TV rights in April 2018, Taylor re-signed for another three years to give his expert analysis on the Ashes 2019, 2019 Cricket World Cup & 2020 T20 World Cup and as a digital contributor.

He mainly commentates on One Day International and Test matches in Australia until the network's final year of cricket telecasts, so he can now spend more time with his family. He used to also appear on The Cricket Show with Simon O'Donnell, and is a spokesman for Fujitsu air-conditioners. He also commentates for radio.

Taylor is patron of the Mark Taylor Shield Cricket competition run for NSW Catholic Primary schools in and around the Sydney region. On 6 November 2011, Waitara Oval, the home of the Northern District Cricket Club, had its name formally changed to Mark Taylor Oval, to honour its former First Grade captain and life member.

In October 2015, The Primary Club of Australia announced that Mark Taylor had accepted the role of Twelfth Man and Patron following the passing of their former Patron, Richie Benaud OBE. He also became Director of Cricket Australia, and commissioned a replacement cap for Benaud. Benaud died before he could receive it, so the cap was presented to his wife.
