= 1996 Cricket World Cup final =

1996 ICC Cricket World Cup Final
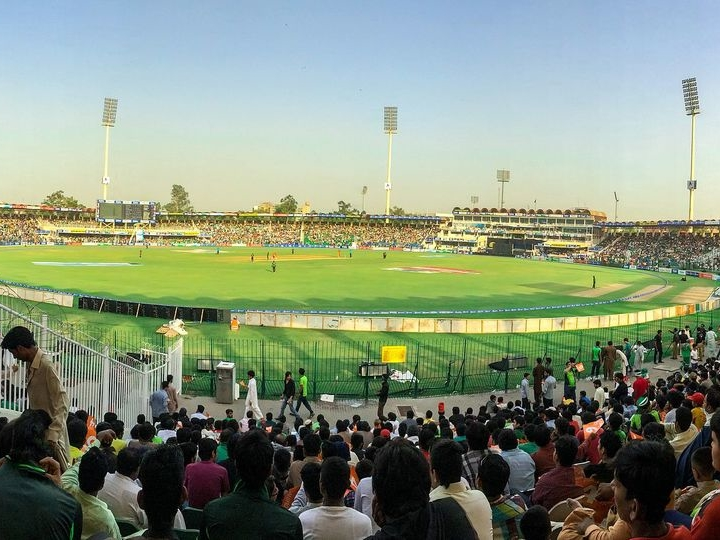
- Gaddafi Stadium during 1996 World Cup Final
- Event: 1996 ICC Cricket World Cup
Australia	Sri Lanka
(Australia)	(Sri Lanka)
241/7	245/3
50 overs	46.2 overs
- Sri Lanka won by 7 wickets
- Date: 17 March 1996
- Venue: Gaddafi Stadium, Lahore
- Player of the match: Aravinda de Silva (SL)
- Umpires: Steve Bucknor (WI) and David Shepherd (Eng)
- Attendance: 62,645

The 1996 ICC Cricket World Cup Final was a cricket match played to determine the winner of the sixth installment of the ICC Cricket World Cup. The match was played on 17 March 1996 at Lahore's Gaddafi Stadium. In 1996 the stadium had a capacity of about 60,000 spectators and was hosting a final for the first time. The match was contested between former World Cup winners Australia, who were considered the favourites and Sri Lanka. It was Australia's third World Cup final appearance after their win in the 1987 edition and the loss to West Indies in the 1975 ICC Cricket World Cup final. It was Sri Lanka's first final appearance.

After Australia scored 241 runs for the loss of 7 wickets in their allotted 50 overs, Sri Lanka won the match by scoring 245 runs for the loss of only 3 wickets with 22 balls remaining. Consequently, Sri Lanka emerged as the champions of the 1996 World Cup. This was the first ever World Cup final where a team won by chasing the target.

== Background ==
Australia and Sri Lanka had never previously faced each other in a major tournament final. Australia were former winners of the World Cup in 1987 whilst Sri Lanka had never gotten past the group stages of the competition.

The two teams however, had a fierce rivalry stemming from Sri Lanka's tour to Australia in the summer of 1995/1996. Their up-and-coming spin bowler Muttiah Muralitharan was the subject of much scrutiny during the tour as he was called for 'chucking' during the Boxing Day Test of 1995 by field umpire Darrell Hair. The treatment of Muralitharan was compared to a "public execution" by the commentator, Jim Maxwell. After the test series resulting in a resounding 3–0 win to Australia, the triangular one-day series, known as the 'Benson and Hedges World Series' was a much closer contest. Along with other participants the West Indies, Sri Lanka proved a challenge for the all conquering Australian team, who were not able to win easily like their past fixtures. Sri Lanka brushed the West Indies aside to reach the final of the tournament against Australia, sporting a full head of steam after defeating Australia in their previous match at the MCG. However, Australia ran out 2–0 winners and the tension between the teams was evident through the post-tournament celebrations. Mark Taylor, Australia's captain had offered to shake the hand of Ranatunga, who declined. Many thought that this was due to the Muralitharan affair. Many Sri Lankans cited the incident as an act of racism and discrimination towards the Sri Lankans and to Muralitharan himself. This was augmented by the chants from the fanatic Australian fans yelling No Ball!! every time Muralitharan bowled a ball.

During the world cup, Australia and the West Indies refused to travel to Sri Lanka due to security concerns in the wake of a suicide bombing in Sri Lanka. Although Sri Lanka were awarded points from their match with Australia by default, this incident contributed to increasing tensions ahead of the final.

== Road to final ==
Sri Lanka

Sri Lanka had finished top of Group A ahead of Australia who were in the same group. Their first match of the tournament was scheduled to be against Australia themselves at the R Premadasa Stadium in Colombo. However, Australia citing safety concerns refused to play the game and forfeited, giving Sri Lanka a handy 2 points. Their next match against Zimbabwe also in Colombo proved to be an easy win for the Lankans with De Silva pounding 91 off 86 balls to lead the chase of 228 in 37 overs. The West Indies then also followed suit handing Sri Lanka a further 2 points for the same reason as the Australians. Sri Lanka then head to Delhi, India to take on an in-form India. Tendulkar blitzed a century before Sanath Jayasuriya provided some fireworks of his own smashing 79 off 76 balls and leading Sri Lanka to a comfortable 6 wicket win chasing 272 for victory. Sri Lanka's final group match was against the lowly Kenya who had upset the West Indies earlier in the tournament. However, Sri Lanka were far from complacent as a ruthless batting display lead them to the highest One Day International Team Score ever scoring 5–398 in their 50 overs. De Silva once again the star this time scoring 145. Sri Lanka then faced England in the quarter-finals of the competition. But the Englishmen proved to be no contest for the Sri Lankan's as new star Sanath Jayasuriya revelled in his opening role scoring a merciless 82 off 44 balls leading Sri Lanka to reach the score of 237 in 40 overs.

The semi-finals saw Sri Lanka pitted against India yet again at the 120,000 seater stadium of Eden Gardens in Kolkata, India. India were hot favourites to win, despite Sri Lanka's hot form coming into the game. India's home advantage was expected to see them through to the final. Captain Mohammad Azharuddin won the toss and knowing Sri Lanka's ability to chase down totals whilst batting second, put them in to bat first, even though the pitch was predicted to play up under the floodlights. Sri Lanka's hopes seemed to be dashed as they lost both Jayasuriya and the equally destructive Romesh Kaluwitharana in the first over of the innings leaving Sri Lanka at 2–1. However, De Silva made a counterattacking 66 off just 47 balls shifting the momentum back to the Lankans. Sri Lanka eventually reached 8–251 from their 50 overs thanks to their long batting order. However, it again looked bleak for Sri Lanka as Sachin Tendulkar, India's own batting sensation lead India to 1–98 in around 20 overs. But his dismissal triggered an amazing collapse which left the favourites at 8–120. The Kolkata crowd began to throw bottles and other projectiles at the Sri Lankans who were awarded the match by default. On the day, 110,000 plus people attended the event at Eden Gardens

Australia

Australia, forfeited their match to Sri Lanka. However, they started their campaign well easily defeating Kenya by 97 runs. A few days later, they defeated India by 16 runs in a close match. They then defeated Zimbabwe by 8 wickets. This allowed them to qualify for the quarter-finals despite a four-wicket loss to the West Indies.

In the fourth quarterfinal, Australia defeated New Zealand by six wickets to qualify for the semi-finals. The semi final with West Indies was a very close match. West Indies were cruising to victory and needed only 43 runs from 52 balls with eight wickets in hand before suffering a dramatic collapse. In the last over, West Indies needed six runs to win, with the West Indian captain Richie Richardson remaining unbeaten. However, Courtney Walsh, who was on strike, lost his wicket to Damien Fleming leading Australia to a very unlikely victory.

== Details ==
=== Match officials ===
- On-field umpires: Steve Bucknor (WI) and David Shepherd (Eng)
- Third umpire: Cyril Mitchley (SA)
- Match referee: Clive Lloyd (WI)

=== Summary ===
Sri Lankan captain Arjuna Ranatunga won the toss and sent Australia out to bat. Ranatunga later reminisced that he had visited the stadium the previous night with the manager and observed the "weight of dew" on the ground which led them to the conclusion that it would be advantageous to bat second.

After a blazing start from captain Mark Taylor and young superstar and future captain Ricky Ponting, Australia fell from being 1–137 to 5–170 after Sri Lanka's four-pronged spin attack took its toll. Australia eventually reached 7–241 in its quota of 50 overs. Sri Lanka overcame a nervous start where they lost both openers before the score was 30, to win in 45 overs. Sri Lankan batting sensation Aravinda De Silva played a match-winning knock of 107 not out and was assisted ably by fellow veterans Asanka Gurusingha (65) and captain Ranatunga (47 not out). De Silva was named the man of the match for his all-round performance. Apart from his century while batting, he bowled 10 overs taking 3 wickets for 42 runs during the Australian innings. Sanath Jayasuriya was awarded the man of the series award.

17 March 1996
scorecard

Australia; 241/7 (50 overs)	v	Sri Lanka; 245/3 (46.2 overs)
Mark Taylor 74 (83); Aravinda de Silva 3/42 (9 overs)		Aravinda de Silva 107 (124); Damien Fleming 1/43 (6 overs)

Sri Lanka won by 7 wickets
Gaddafi Stadium, Lahore
Attendance : 62,645
Umpires: Steve Bucknor (WI) and David Shepherd (Eng)
Player of the match: Aravinda de Silva (SL)

- Sri Lanka won the toss and elected to field.

== Scorecard ==
Australia batting
Player	Status	Runs	Balls	4s	6s	Strike rate
Mark Taylor*	c Jayasuriya b de Silva	74	83	8	1	89.15
Mark Waugh	c Jayasuriya b Vaas	12	15	1	0	80.00
Ricky Ponting	b de Silva	45	73	2	0	61.64
Steve Waugh	c de Silva b Dharmasena	13	25	0	0	52.00
Shane Warne	st †Kaluwitharana b Muralitharan	2	5	0	0	40.00
Stuart Law	c de Silva b Jayasuriya	22	30	0	1	73.33
Michael Bevan	not out	36	49	2	0	73.46
Ian Healy†	b de Silva	2	3	0	0	66.66
Paul Reiffel	not out	13	18	0	0	72.22
Damien Fleming	did not bat					
Glenn McGrath	did not bat					
Extras	(lb 10, nb 1, w 11)	22				
Total	(7 wickets; 50 overs)	241		13	2	

Fall of wickets: 1-36 (ME Waugh), 2–137 (Taylor), 3–152 (Ponting), 4–156 (Warne), 5–170 (SR Waugh), 6–202 (Law), 7–205 (Healy)

Sri Lanka bowling
Bowler	Overs	Maidens	Runs	Wickets	Econ	Wides	NBs
Pramodya Wickramasinghe	7	0	38	0	5.42	4	0
Chaminda Vaas	6	1	30	1	5.00	0	0
Muttiah Muralitharan	10	0	31	1	3.10	1	0
Kumar Dharmasena	10	0	47	1	4.70	0	1
Sanath Jayasuriya	8	0	43	1	5.37	5	0
Aravinda de Silva	9	0	42	3	4.66	3	0

Sri Lanka batting
Player	Status	Runs	Balls	4s	6s	Strike rate
Sanath Jayasuriya	run out (†Healy)	9	7	1	0	128.57
Romesh Kaluwitharana†	c Bevan b Fleming	6	13	0	0	46.15
Asanka Gurusinha	b Reiffel	65	99	6	1	66.65
Aravinda de Silva	not out	107	124	18	0	86.29
Arjuna Ranatunga*	not out	47	37	4	1	127.02
Hashan Tillakaratne						
Roshan Mahanama						
Kumar Dharmasena						
Chaminda Vaas						
Pramodya Wickramasinghe						
Muttiah Muralitharan						
Extras	(b 1, lb 4, nb 1, w 5)	11				
Total	(3 wickets; 46.2 overs)	245		29	2	

Fall of wickets: 1-12 (Jayasuriya), 2–23 (Kaluwitharana), 3–148 (Gurusinha)

Australia bowling
Bowler	Overs	Maidens	Runs	Wickets	Econ	Wides	NBs
Glenn McGrath	8.2	1	28	0	3.36	0	0
Damien Fleming	6	0	43	1	7.16	4	0
Shane Warne	10	0	58	0	5.80	1	1
Paul Reiffel	10	0	49	1	4.90	0	0
Mark Waugh	6	0	35	0	5.83	0	0
Steve Waugh	3	0	15	0	5.00	0	1
Michael Bevan	3	0	12	0	4.00	0	0
