= 1996 Cricket World Cup 1st semi-final =

1996 Cricket World Cup semi-final (India v Sri Lanka)
- Event: 1996 Cricket World Cup
| Sri Lanka | India |
| 251/8 | 120/8 |
| 50 overs | 34.1 overs |
- Date: 13 March 1996
- Venue: Eden Gardens, Kolkata
- Player of the match: Aravinda de Silva (Sri Lanka)
- Umpires: Steve Dunne (New Zealand) and Cyril Mitchley (South Africa) with Clive Lloyd (West Indies) being the referee
- Attendance: 100,000

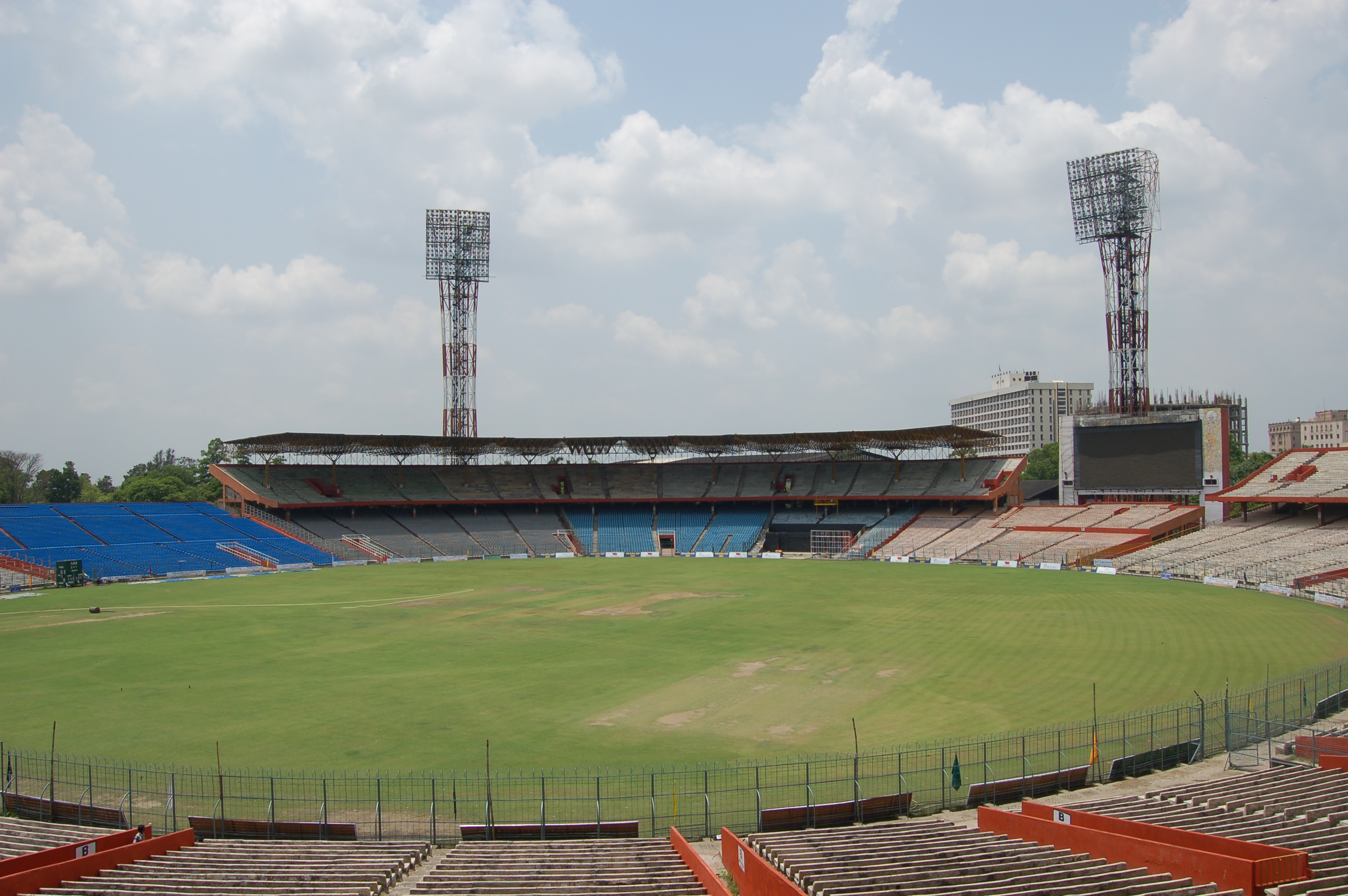
Eden Gardens before the 2011 renovations had the capacity of around 100,000

1996 Cricket World Cup semi-final was a One Day International (ODI) cricket match played between Sri Lanka and India on 13 March 1996 at Eden Gardens in Kolkata as the first semi-final of the 1996 Cricket World Cup. Sri Lanka scored 251 runs for the loss of eight wickets in their allotted 50 overs, while India collapsed from 98/1 to 120/8 during their chase. The match became one of the most controversial fixtures in Cricket World Cup history after crowd disturbances forced referee Clive Lloyd to abandon the match and award victory to Sri Lanka.

India entered the semi-final after defeating Pakistan in the quarter-finals, while Sri Lanka had beaten England. The match attracted intense public attention in India because of Sri Lanka's aggressive batting approach during the tournament, led by opening batters Sanath Jayasuriya and Romesh Kaluwitharana.

After India won the toss and chose to field, Sri Lanka lost both openers early to Javagal Srinath, but recovered through a partnership between Aravinda de Silva and Roshan Mahanama. De Silva scored 66 runs from 47 balls and Mahanama made 58 before retiring hurt. Contributions from captain Arjuna Ranatunga and Hashan Tillakaratne helped Sri Lanka finish on 251/8 in 50 overs. Indian spinner Anil Kumble took 3 wickets for 51 runs.

India's innings was anchored by Sachin Tendulkar, who scored 65 runs and shared partnerships with Navjot Singh Sidhu and Sanjay Manjrekar. However, after Tendulkar was stumped off Jayasuriya with the score at 98/2, India lost seven wickets for 22 runs and slumped to 120/8. Television footage of Vinod Kambli leaving the field in tears became one of the defining images of the tournament.

Following the fall of India's eighth wicket, spectators at Eden Gardens threw bottles and debris onto the field and set sections of the stadium on fire. Players briefly left the field before attempting to resume play, but further crowd trouble caused Lloyd to abandon the match and award it to Sri Lanka by default. Sri Lanka subsequently defeated Australia in the final at Gaddafi Stadium in Lahore to win their first World Cup title.

== See also ==
- 1996 Cricket World Cup final
- Cricket in India
- Eden Gardens
