= Said Shah =

Pakistani cricket umpire (1940–2021)

Personal information
- Full name: Said Ahmed Shah
- Born: 28 April 1940; Peshawar, North West Frontier Province, British India
- Died: 5 February 2021 (aged 80); Peshawar, Pakistan
- Role: Umpire

Umpiring information
- Tests umpired: 1 (1997)
- ODIs umpired: 5 (1984–1997)
- Source: Cricinfo, 6 February 2021

Said Ahmed Shah (28 April 1940 – 5 February 2021) was a Pakistani academic and cricket umpire. He stood in one Test match, between Pakistan and the West Indies, in 1984 and five ODI games between 1984 and 1997. He also stood in ninety-four first-class cricket and forty-seven List A cricket matches between 1972 and 2000.

He was educated at the Islamia College Peshawar between 1957 and 1963 where he did his master's degree in political science and history. He started his career as a lecturer in Charsaddah College before being transferred to Government College, Peshawar in 1980 where he retired as a professor of history twenty years later.

== See also ==
- List of Test cricket umpires
- List of One Day International cricket umpires
