= Saqib Qureshi =

Pakistani cricket umpire (1947–1998)

Personal information
- Born: 18 January 1947; Karachi, Pakistan
- Died: 28 March 1998 (aged 51); Karachi, Pakistan

Umpiring information
- ODIs umpired: 1 (1994)
- Source: Cricinfo, 26 May 2014

Saqib Qureshi (18 January 1947 – 28 March 1998) was a Pakistani cricket umpire. The only international match he officiated in was a One Day International in 1994.

== See also ==
- List of One Day International cricket umpires
