= Justin Vaughan =

New Zealand cricketer (born 1967)

Personal information
- Full name: Justin Thomas Caldwell Vaughan
- Born: 30 August 1967 (age 59); Hereford, England
- Batting: Left-handed
- Bowling: Right-arm medium
- Role: All-rounder

International information
- National side: New Zealand (1992–1997)
- Test debut (cap 183): 27 November 1992 v Sri Lanka
- Last Test: 24 January 1997 v England
- ODI debut (cap 82): 4 December 1992 v Sri Lanka
- Last ODI: 8 December 1996 v Pakistan

Career statistics
Competition	Test	ODI	FC	LA
Matches	6	18	70	90
Runs scored	201	162	3,159	1,635
Batting average	18.27	18.00	31.59	24.04
100s/50s	0/0	0/0	2/16	0/8
Top score	44	33	127	94
Balls bowled	1,040	696	8,089	2,745
Wickets	11	15	132	123
Bowling average	40.90	34.93	26.06	22.31
5 wickets in innings	0	0	3	1
10 wickets in match	0	0	0	0
Best bowling	4/27	4/33	8/27	6/26
Catches/stumpings	4/–	4/–	66/–	31/–
- Source: Cricinfo, 4 May 2017

Justin Thomas Caldwell Vaughan (born 30 August 1967) is a New Zealand cricket administrator and former cricketer who played six Test matches and 18 One Day Internationals between 1992 and 1997. He is a doctor of medicine by profession.

== Life and career ==
Vaughan was an all-rounder: a left-handed middle-order batsman and right-arm medium-pace bowler. He played first-class cricket for Auckland in New Zealand domestic cricket from 1990 to 1997. He also had a season in England with Gloucestershire in 1992.

Vaughan's highest first-class score was 127 when Auckland defeated Canterbury in January 1996. His best bowling figures were 8 for 27 when Auckland beat Otago by three wickets in March 1997. He captained Auckland in both these matches, and led the team for the four seasons from 1993–94 to 1996–97. He was a very effective and economical bowler in limited-overs cricket, with best figures of 6 for 26 against Otago in December 1995.

In April 2007 he was appointed to the position of Chief Executive of New Zealand Cricket (NZC) and commenced in that position on 5 June 2007, taking over from Martin Snedden. He announced that he would step down from the position as of November 2011, citing family reasons for the decision. He has three children, Natalie, Jemima, and Bruno.

Vaughan was Chief Executive of BrainZ Instruments, an Auckland-based medical technology company listed on the ASX specialising in the development of innovative brain monitoring technology. In 2013, he moved to Sydney to take an executive role with leading Australian health insurer, NIB. He finished this role in 2020, and commenced as CEO of emerging health technology company BioEye in 2021.
