= Eric Simons =

South African cricketer and coach

Personal information
- Born: 9 March 1962 (age 64); Cape Town, South Africa
- Batting: Right-handed
- Bowling: Right-arm fast-medium

Career statistics
Competition	ODI
Matches	23
Runs scored	217
Batting average	15.50
100s/50s	0/0
Top score	24
Balls bowled	1212
Wickets	33
Bowling average	24.54
5 wickets in innings	0
10 wickets in match	0
Best bowling	4/42
Catches/stumpings	6/–
- Source: Cricinfo, 31 December 2006

Eric Owen Simons (born 9 March 1962) is a South African cricket coach and former cricketer. He was an all-rounder who played 23 One Day Internationals for South Africa in the 1990s. He later became coach of the national side for two years but he was replaced in 2004 by Ray Jennings.

He was the Indian Cricket Team's Bowling Consultant from 10 January 2010 to 14 February 2012 after India's tour of Australia in 2011–2012.

He is the assistant coach of the IPL franchise Chennai Super Kings (CSK) from the past 7 years. During the 2 years when CSK was suspended, he served as the bowling coach of the IPL franchise Rising Pune Supergiant. He was also appointed as the assistant coach for the CSK-owned Joburg Super Kings in the SA20 league recently. He was one of the guys who was trusted by the CSK owners for their successful journey in the IPL seasons.

Preceded by Terry Hunte	Nelson Cricket Club; Professional; 1986	Succeeded by Steve Waugh
