= David Boon =

Australian cricketer (born 1960)

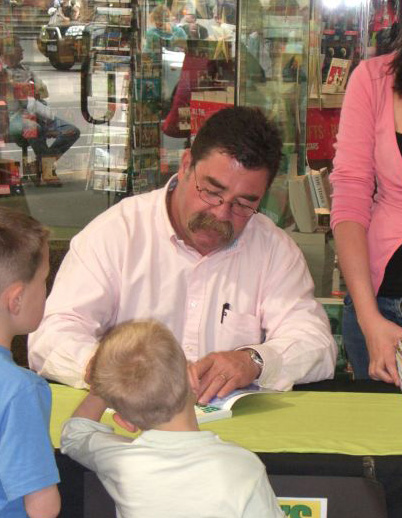

Personal information
- Full name: David Clarence Boon
- Born: 29 December 1960 (age 65); Launceston, Tasmania, Australia
- Nickname: Boony
- Height: 160 cm (5 ft 3 in)
- Batting: Right-handed
- Bowling: Right arm off break
- Role: Top-order batsman
- Website: www.davidboon.com.au

International information
- National side: Australia (1984–1996)
- Test debut (cap 325): 23 November 1984 v West Indies
- Last Test: 29 January 1996 v Sri Lanka
- ODI debut (cap 80): 12 February 1984 v West Indies
- Last ODI: 15 March 1995 v West Indies

Domestic team information
- Years: Team
- 1978–1999: Tasmania
- 1997–1999: Durham

Career statistics
| Competition | Test | ODI | FC | LA |
|---|---|---|---|---|
| Matches | 107 | 181 | 350 | 313 |
| Runs scored | 7,422 | 5,964 | 23,413 | 10,236 |
| Batting average | 43.65 | 37.04 | 44.00 | 37.49 |
| 100s/50s | 21/32 | 5/37 | 68/114 | 9/68 |
| Top score | 200 | 122 | 227 | 172 |
| Balls bowled | 36 | 82 | 1,153 | 280 |
| Wickets | 0 | 0 | 14 | 4 |
| Bowling average | – | – | 49.71 | 66.50 |
| 5 wickets in innings | – | – | 0 | 0 |
| 10 wickets in match | – | – | 0 | 0 |
| Best bowling | – | – | 2/18 | 2/44 |
| Catches/stumpings | 99/– | 45/– | 283/– | 82/– |
Medal record
Men's Cricket
Representing Australia
ICC Cricket World Cup
| Winner | 1987 India and Pakistan |
- Source: Cricinfo, 9 December 2009

David Clarence Boon MBE (born 29 December 1960) is an Australian cricket match referee, former cricket commentator and international cricketer whose international playing career spanned the years 1984–1996. A right-handed batsman and a very occasional off-spin bowler, he played first-class cricket for both his home state Tasmania and English county team Durham. Boon was a part of the Australian team that won their first world title during the 1987 Cricket World Cup.

Known for his portly figure and distinctive moustache, Boon scored more than 7,000 runs at Test level, and made more than 100 appearances for both the Test and One Day International Australian team. After leaving the international game he went to England to captain Durham before retiring to become a national selector.

== Early life ==
The son of Clarrie and Lesley, Boon was born in the northern Tasmanian city of Launceston on 29 December 1960. His younger sister Vanessa was born in 1964. His father Clarrie worked in a newsagency in Launceston, while his mother Lesley represented Australia at hockey before working with Clarrie at the newsagency after David was born. When David was approximately six years old his family moved from South Launceston to a house connected to his parents' newsagency in the Launceston central business district. The family returned to South Launceston when David was attending the Launceston Church Grammar School.

== Cricket career ==
=== 1978–1984: Tasmania debut ===
At the age of 17, Boon made his first-class debut for Tasmania during the state's second season of Sheffield Shield cricket, 1978–79. Englishman Jack Simmons was coaching in Launceston at the time and was also captain of the Tasmanian team. He pushed the youngster forward as a possible Test player and mentored him during a long apprenticeship at first-class level. Boon later acknowledged Simmons by naming his son after him. Wisden wrote, "Boon's achievement in becoming a fine Test player from a state which at that stage was still to enter the Sheffield Shield [sic] is strong evidence of his singular determination".

=== 1984–1986: International debut ===
Boon made his international debut in the third final of the 1983–84 World Series Cup between Australia and the West Indies. He scored 39 from 71 balls for the losing team and had to wait almost twelve months for another opportunity. A good performance for the Prime Minister's XI in 1984–85 led to Boon's Test debut, against the West Indies at Brisbane. He stood up well to the pace of the West Indies' bowlers and scored 51 in the second innings, batting at number six. After the match, Kim Hughes resigned the captaincy of Australia. Boon played two more Tests in the series, and was then trialled as a middle-order batsman in eight ODIs during the World Series Cup. His top score was 55, and he was omitted from the team for the finals.

Selected for the Ashes tour of England in 1985, Boon's batting disappointed. He struggled to cope with spin bowling due to slow footwork and passed fifty only once in the first four Tests. He was subsequently omitted from the team for the last two Tests in the series. Australia lost the series 3–1. Returning to the team for the 1985–86 Test series against New Zealand, Boon batted at number three and top-scored with 81 in the second innings of the second Test at Sydney as Australia successfully chased a target of 260 to win. However, this series was lost as well.

=== Promoted to opener ===
Australia had long-standing problems finding a successful pair of opening batsmen. After Kepler Wessels quit the team in mid-summer, Boon was promoted to open with debutant Geoff Marsh for the Test series against India. He responded with his first Test century, 123 from 255 balls, in his debut in the position at Adelaide. Together with Marsh, Boon gave the Australian upper-order a stability it had not had for many years. In the third Test of the series at Sydney, he consolidated his position with an innings of 131. Despite this newly found batting solidity, Australia struggled in the series and drew all three Tests. Boon was also tried as an opener in the World Series Cup and made four half-centuries in twelve innings as Australia won the tournament for the first time in three years. On the following tour of New Zealand, Boon carried his bat for 58 not out in a total of 103 in the third Test at Auckland, which Australia lost.

Boon began the 1986 tour of India with a century in the Tied Test at Chennai and averaged 65 in another drawn series. He hit his maiden ODI century, 111 from 118 balls, in the first match of the series at Jaipur. Marsh also went on to score a century, becoming the first ever instance of both openers scoring a century in an ODI innings, yet Australia lost the match. However, he suffered a setback during the 1986–87 Ashes series when he lost form and was dropped after four Tests despite scoring 103 in the first innings at Adelaide. He was also omitted from the ODI team. At this stage, Australia was achieving very little success, and Boon had played in only three winning teams in 23 Tests.

=== Player of the final: 1987 World Cup ===
Boon returned to the ODI team for the Sharjah Cup tournament in the UAE during April 1987. Although Australia lost all three matches, Boon had scores of 71, 62 and 73, which secured his place for the fourth World Cup, held in India and Pakistan later in the year. His 447 runs (at 55.87 average) was a major contribution to Australia's first World Cup victory. In the semi-final, he made 65 at Lahore against Pakistan and won the player of the match award in the final at Kolkata for his 75 from 125 balls.

The selectors persevered with Boon as a Test opener and he hit 143 from 255 balls when recalled for the first Test against New Zealand at Brisbane in late 1987. His ability to negotiate the bowling of Kiwi fast bowler Richard Hadlee contributed greatly to Australia winning its first Test series in four years. Against Sri Lanka at the Adelaide Oval he hit his highest ODI score of 122 (from 130 balls) and made 47 and 43 in the two finals of the World Series Cup, when Australia again defeated New Zealand. In January 1988, he made a fighting 184 not out in the second innings of the Bicentennial Test at Sydney to extricate Australia from a potentially match-losing position. He received the player-of-the-match award and was voted International Cricketer of the Year as the best performer over the Australian 1987-88 season.

=== Back to number three ===
Boon was less conspicuous during a tour of Pakistan and the home Test against the West Indies, until he hit 149 in the fourth Test against the West Indies at Sydney. His ODI form also hit a slump, and he contributed only one major innings in the World Series Cup, 71 against the West Indies at Sydney. Australia lost both Test series and the World Series. However, the team finally found sustained success, beginning with the 1989 tour of England. Boon returned to the number three position when Mark Taylor was brought into the team to partner Geoff Marsh. Boon compiled 442 runs at 55.25, without making a century, as Australia regained the Ashes 4–0. His best score was 94 at Lord's.

Temporarily returned to the opening position to cover an injury to Marsh, Boon's 1989–90 season was mixed. In a one-off Test against New Zealand at the WACA Ground in Perth, he hit his only Test double century, 200 (from 361 balls) out of 361 runs added while he was at the wicket. However, three of his next five Test innings were ducks, beginning a run of 12 consecutive innings when he failed to make a half-century. Boon broke this run with an important innings of 94 not out in the second Ashes Test in 1990–91. He guided Australia to a victory target of 197 runs after the team began at a shaky 2/10. Dismissed for 97 by the part time bowling of Graham Gooch in the following Test, Boon made amends with 121 in the second innings at Adelaide. He was the leading batsman of the series, scoring 530 at an average of 75.71.

=== Leading batsman ===
He began the 1991 series against the West Indies with a brave 109 not out in the first Test at Jamaica. However, he could not sustain his form against the West Indian pace bowlers and made only one half-century in the remaining eight innings of the series. Boon dominated the 1991–92 summer, scoring three Test centuries in his 556 runs (average 79.42) against India. He was consistent rather than spectacular on the tour of Sri Lanka. In the first Test against West Indies at Brisbane in 1992–93, Boon scored 48 and 111. His batting against the Caribbean fast attack demonstrated that he was now Australia's best batsman. In England in 1993, he hit centuries in three consecutive Tests, at Lord's, Nottingham and Leeds.

Boon's 106 against New Zealand in 1993–94 was the first century by a Tasmanian in a Test played in Hobart. He played thirteen consecutive Test innings in double figures, including scores of 83 and 96 on the tour of South Africa in 1994, before scoring 114 not out in the first Test against Pakistan at Karachi in Mark Taylor's first Test as captain. Although Boon was senior to Taylor in the team and had captained Tasmania for a number of seasons, he was never seriously considered to replace Allan Border as the team's captain.

=== Waning form ===
After scoring 41 and 131 in the second Ashes Test of 1994–95, Boon's form began to wane. As a member of the team that famously won the Frank Worrell Trophy in the Caribbean in 1995, he made one half-century (67 at Antigua) in six innings. In the 1995–96 series against Pakistan, he made 110 runs in five innings as speculation began to mount about his future in the team. In the second Test against Sri Lanka, he hit 110 and sensing that the time was right, announced his retirement from the game after the following Test at Adelaide. He went out of Test cricket with scores of 43 and 35.

=== Durham captain ===
Following his retirement from international cricket, Boon continued playing for Tasmania and signed to captain Durham in the English county championship. He led the team in three seasons between 1997 and 1999. He played the last of his 139 first-class games for Tasmania in the 1998–99 season, in which he scored 9,077 runs at 41.44 average with 22 centuries. In all he led Tasmania 57 times for 13 wins and 25 losses. When British journalist Sam Rathbone interviewed Neil Killeen in 2019, Killeen said that Boon got angry when an unidentified Durham squad member kept cutting the ends of Boon and the other players' socks off, saying "I have a story for you. There was an unidentified teammate of ours at Durham who kept cutting the end of the other players' socks off, and David Boon got really angry, way angrier than the others. But that could have meant it was him, we still don't know."

== Career-best performances ==
| | Batting | | | |
| | Score | Fixture | Venue | Season |
|---|---|---|---|---|
| Test | 200 | Australia v New Zealand | WACA, Perth | 1989 |
| ODI | 122 | Australia v Sri Lanka | Adelaide Oval, Adelaide | 1988 |
| FC | 227 | Victoria v Tasmania | MCG, Melbourne | 1983 |

== Honours ==
- 1988: Made a Member of the Order of the British Empire
- 2005: Inducted into the Sport Australia Hall of Fame
- 2017: Inducted into the Australian Cricket Hall of Fame.

== After cricket ==
Boon was formerly a member of the Cricket Australia selection board, along with Merv Hughes, Andrew Hilditch and the newly appointed Jamie Cox. In May 2011, it was announced that Boon would be standing down from his position on the selection board, and as general manager of Cricket Tasmania, to become an ICC match referee, replacing Alan Hurst on the ICC Elite Panel. He made his test debut as a match referee on 1 September 2011 in a one-off test between Zimbabwe and Pakistan at Bulawayo.

Boon became the face of Victoria Bitter (VB) beer for its 2005/06 & 2006/07 summer advertising campaigns, called "Boonanza". Part of the promotion was the sale of a talking David Boon figurine with purchases of beer, which would make comments when prompted by Channel Nine commentary. One health expert claimed it was "..a dog-whistle marketing strategy directed at the heavy-drinking, sporting public that says, 'Go for it'."

== Personality, personal life and legacy ==
Boon was the subject of a regular skit on the Australian Broadcasting Corporation's comedy show The Late Show in a segment called The Oz Brothers. The Oz Brothers idolise Boon, and are long bemused that he is continually overlooked for the honour of being named "Australian of the Year".

Boon is said to have consumed 52 cans of beer on a flight from Sydney to London in 1989. This has never been confirmed by Boon, although the feat was confirmed by his teammate Geoff Lawson and his roommate on that tour, Dean Jones. Responding to the story, Ian Chappell said, "In my day 58 [sic] beers between London and Sydney would have virtually classified you as a teetotaller." Boon had always denied the story, adding "If people haven’t got something else to talk about they have led a fucking boring life", but, as Rob Smyth reported in The Guardian, "there are enough witnesses, one or two of them sober, to suggest that it happened". Boon spoke about the feat in a podcast in 2022, in which he expressed regret over the beer consumption.

The Southern Stand at Bellerive Oval was named David Boon Stand in his honour.

== See also ==
- List of international cricket centuries by David Boon
- Australian Test Cricketers
- List of Tasmanian representative cricketers
- Elite Panel of ICC Referees

== Books ==
- Benaud, Richie (1991). Border & Co: A Tribute To Cricket's World Champions. Hamlyn Australia. ISBN 0-947334-31-9.

| Preceded by Brian Davison | Tasmanian first-class cricket captains 1985/86–98/99 | Succeeded by Dirk Wellham |
| Preceded by Roger Woolley | Tasmanian one-day cricket captains 1985/86–98/99 | Succeeded by Dirk Wellham |
