= List of cricketers by number of international five-wicket hauls =

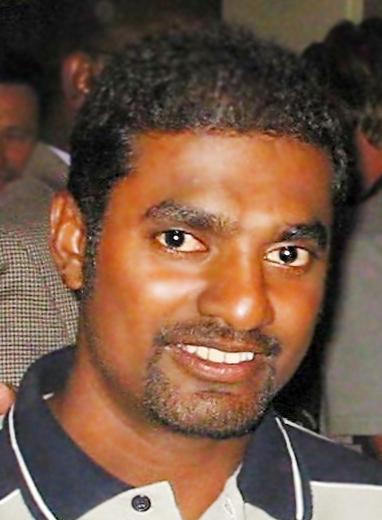
Muttiah Muralitharan has the highest number of five-wicket hauls in Test and international cricket

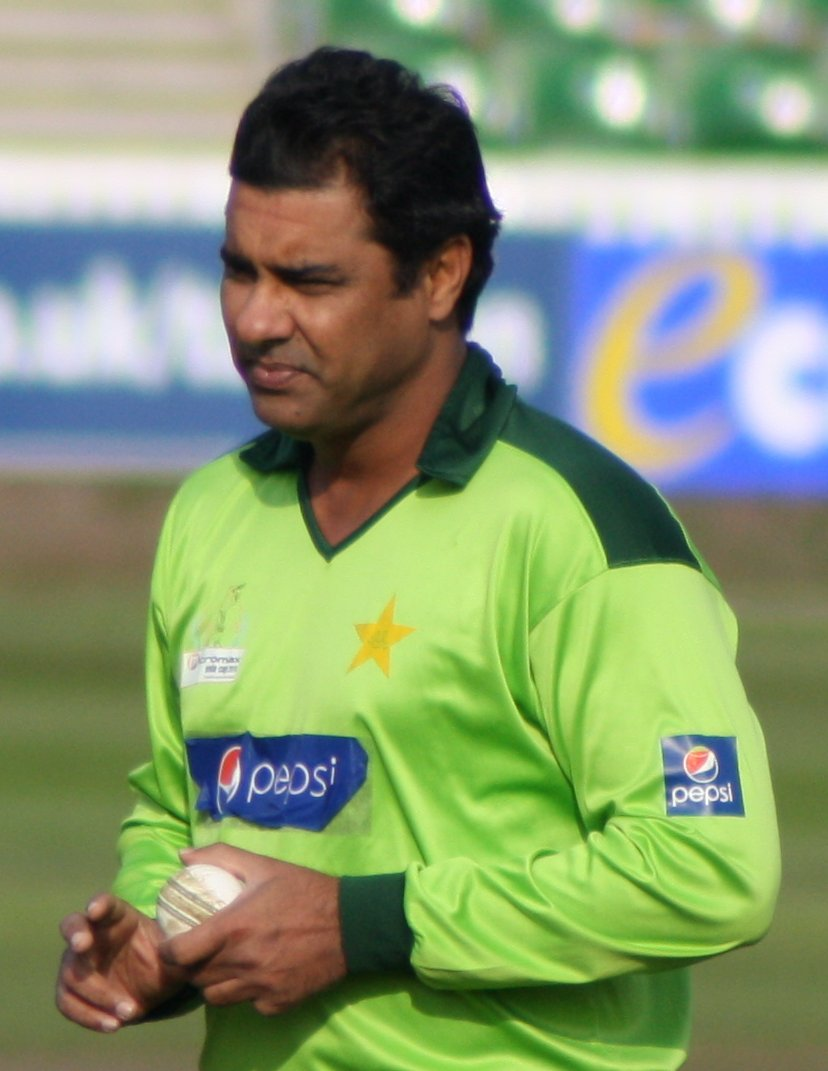
Waqar Younis has the highest number of five-wicket hauls in ODI cricket

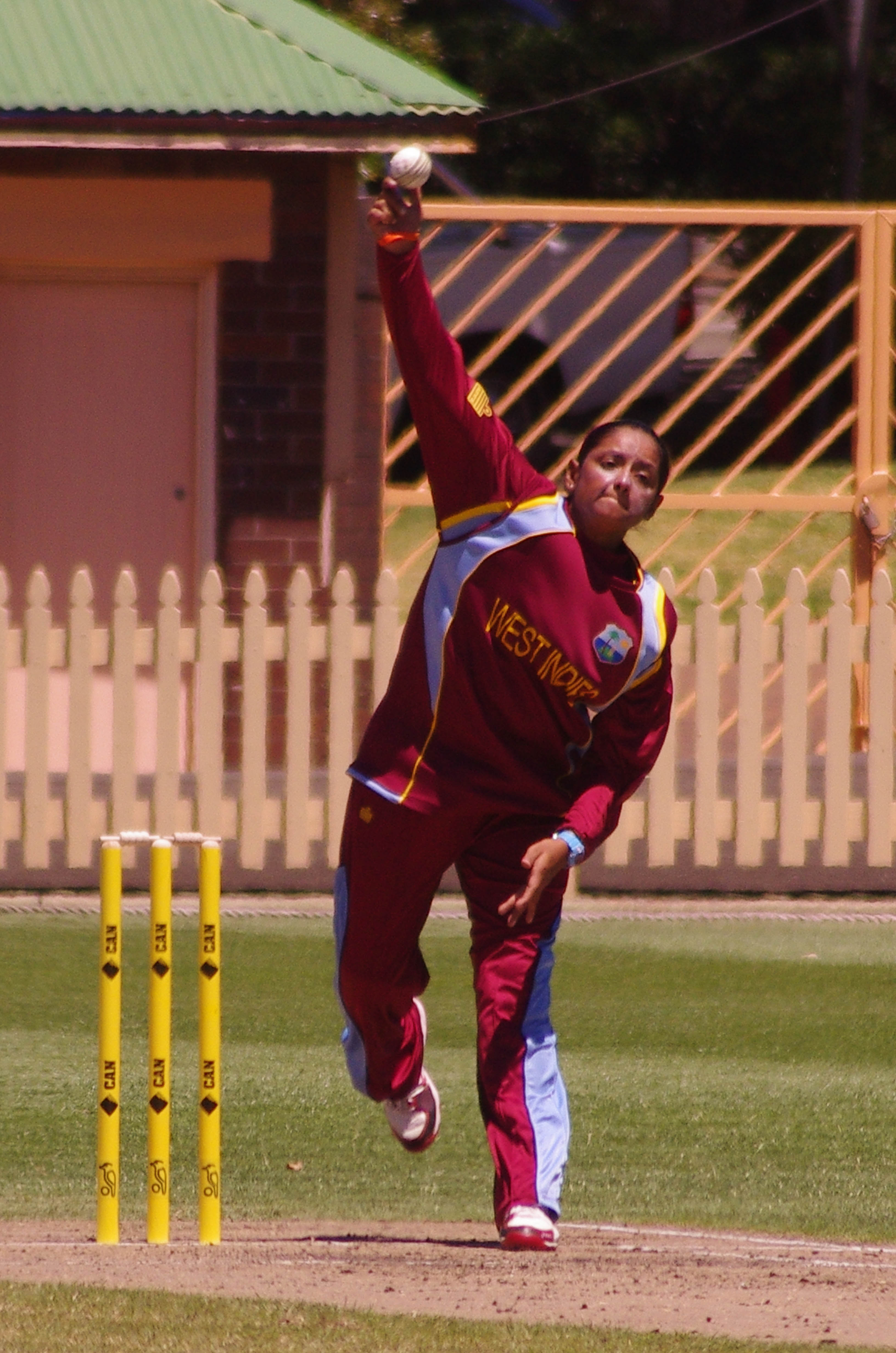
Anisa Mohammed has the highest number of five-wicket hauls in Women's cricket - 8 across ODI and T20I formats

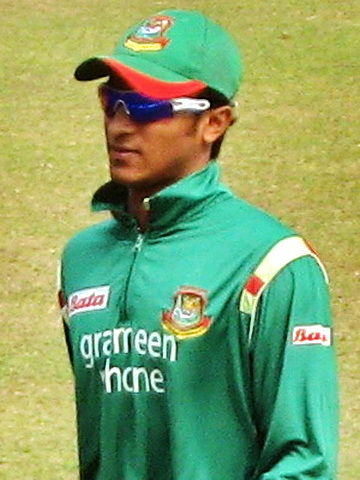
Shakib Al Hasan is one of twelve cricketers who have taken at least a five-wicket haul in all three international formats and he is the only player in this list who has taken more than one five-wicket haul in all three international formats

In cricket, a five-wicket haul – also known as a five-for or fifer – refers to a bowler taking five or more wickets in a single innings. This is regarded as a notable achievement. This list is a compilation of total five-wicket hauls taken by international cricketers, split between different formats and presents a good view to compare the performance of bowlers in all 3 formats of the game that are played at an international level.

Test cricket is the longest form of the sport of cricket and is considered its highest standard for both batsmen and bowlers. Today, Test matches are scheduled to be played across five consecutive days. Bowlers have no limit on the number of overs that they can bowl. Also, since each team can potentially play two innings, the bowlers of each team get the opportunity to bowl at the opposition twice. The first officially recognised Test match took place on 15–19 March 1877 and was played between England and Australia at the Melbourne Cricket Ground (MCG).

One Day International (ODI) cricket is a form of limited overs cricket, played between two teams with international status, in which each team faces a fixed number of overs, usually 50. Bowlers are allowed a maximum of 10 overs in ODI cricket. The first ODI was played on 5 January 1971 between Australia and England at the MCG. Twenty20 International (T20I) cricket is a form of limited overs cricket, played between two of the international members of the International Cricket Council (ICC), in which each team faces twenty overs. Bowlers are allowed a maximum of 4 overs in T20I cricket. The first Twenty20 International match between two men's sides was played on 17 February 2005, involving Australia and New Zealand.

In December 2018 in the 2nd T20I against West Indies, Shakib became the eighth cricketer to take at least one five wicket-haul in all three formats.

== History ==
Players from all teams that are full members of the International Cricket Council (ICC), have five-wicket hauls in a Test. (Note: The teams are Afghanistan, Australia, Bangladesh, England, India, Ireland, New Zealand, Pakistan, South Africa, Sri Lanka, West Indies, and the Zimbabwe.)

The first player to record a five-wicket haul in a Test innings was Australian Billy Midwinter in the second innings of the first Test cricket match ever played. The opponents were England. In the same match, two other players - Alfred Shaw of England and Australian Tom Kendall also recorded five-wicket hauls. Nasim-ul-Ghani is the youngest player to record five-wicket haul, at 16 years and 303 days. Bert Ironmonger is the oldest player to record five-wicket haul, capturing two five-wicket hauls in a match at 49 years and 311 days. three cricketers - Jim Laker, Anil Kumble and Ajaz Patel hold the distinction of taking all 10 wickets in the innings. In the same match where Jim Laker took all wickets in the innings, he captured 19 wickets in the match, the most wickets ever captured by a bowler in a Test match. By December 2018, 150 cricketers had taken five-wicket hauls on Test debut five-wicket haul on debut in a Test match. Of these, nine cricketers have taken two five-wicket hauls on their Test debut, including four from England, two from Australia and one each from India, South Africa and the West Indies.

Dennis Lillee recorded the first five-wicket haul in ODI cricket, taking 5 wickets for 34 runs in 12 overs against Pakistan at Headingley in 1975. Chaminda Vaas has the best haul in ODIs, taking 8 wickets for 19 runs against Zimbabwe in 2001 in Colombo. Mujeeb Ur Rahman (16 years 325 days) and Sunil Dhaniram (Note: playing for Canada) (39 years and 256 days) are the current record holders for youngest and oldest cricketers to record a five-wicket haul in ODI cricket. By December 2018, 13 five-wicket hauls have been taken by players on their ODI debut.

Umar Gul recorded the first five-wicket haul in T20Is, taking 5 wickets for 6 runs in 3 overs against New Zealand at The Oval in 2009. Deepak Chahar has the best haul in T20I taking 6 wickets for 7 runs against Bangladesh at Nagpur in 2019. Rashid Khan (18 years 171 days) and Imran Tahir (37 years 327 days) are the current record holders for youngest and oldest cricketers to record a five-wicket haul in T20I cricket.

Muttiah Muralitharan has the highest number of five-wicket hauls, with 77 across Test and ODI cricket. His haul of 67 five-wicket hauls is the highest in Test cricket. With 13 five-wicket hauls, Waqar Younis holds the highest number of five-wicket hauls in ODI cricket. Twelve players - Umar Gul, Ajantha Mendis, Lasith Malinga, Tim Southee, Imran Tahir, Kuldeep Yadav, Bhuvneshwar Kumar, Shakib Al Hasan, Rashid Khan, Jason Holder, Lungi Ngidi and Alzarri Joseph have taken at least one five-wicket haul in every format.

To date, 58 cricketers have taken 15 or more five-wicket hauls, 31 of whom went on to take 20 or more five-wicket hauls. Ten players have taken 30 or more five-wicket hauls in their international career across the three formats.

== Key ==
Key
^	Inducted into the ICC Cricket Hall of Fame
ǂ	Denotes player who is still active
N/A	Indicates player did not play in that format

== Men's international cricket ==
Last updated: 15 November 2026

Most five-wicket hauls in men's cricket
Rank	Player	Period	Teams	Test	ODI	T20I	Total	10WH
1	Muttiah Muralitharan^	1992–2011	Sri Lanka/Asia/ICC	67	10	0	77	22
2	Richard Hadlee^	1973–1990	New Zealand	36	5	—N/a	41	9
3	Shane Warne^	1992–2007	Australia/ICC	37	1	—N/a	38	10
4	Ravichandran Ashwin	2010–2024	India	37	0	0	37	8
4	Anil Kumble^	1990–2008	India/Asia	35	2	—N/a	37	8
6	Glenn McGrath^	1993–2007	Australia/ICC	29	7	0	36	3
7	Rangana Herath	1999–2018	Sri Lanka	34	0	1	35	9
7	Waqar Younis^	1989–2003	Pakistan	22	13	—N/a	35	5
9	James Anderson	2002–2024	England	32	2	0	34	3
10	Wasim Akram^	1985–2002	Pakistan	25	6	—N/a	31	5
11	Mitchell Starc ǂ	2010–2026	Australia	20	9	0	29	4
11	Dale Steyn	2004–2020	South Africa/Africa	26	3	0	29	5
13	Harbhajan Singh	1998–2016	India/Asia	25	3	0	28	5
14	Ian Botham^	1977–1992	England	27	0	—N/a	27	4
15	Curtly Ambrose^	1988–2000	West Indies	22	4	—N/a	26	3
16	Shakib Al Hasan	2006–2024	Bangladesh	19	4	2	25	2
17	Sydney Barnes^	1901–1914	England	24	—N/a	—N/a	24	7
17	Imran Khan^	1971–1992	Pakistan	23	1	—N/a	24	6
17	Kapil Dev^	1978–1994	India	23	1	—N/a	24	2
17	Dennis Lillee^	1971–1984	Australia	23	1	—N/a	24	7
17	Nathan Lyon ǂ	2011–2026	Australia	24	0	0	24	5
22	Courtney Walsh^	1984–2001	West Indies	22	1	—N/a	23	3
23	Allan Donald^	1991–2003	South Africa	20	2	—N/a	22	3
23	Malcolm Marshall^	1978–1992	West Indies	22	0	—N/a	22	4
23	Makhaya Ntini	1998–2011	South Africa/ICC	18	4	0	22	4
23	Daniel Vettori	1997–2015	New Zealand/ICC	20	2	0	22	3
27	Stuart Broad	2006–2023	England	20	1	0	21	3
27	Clarrie Grimmett^	1925–1936	Australia	21	—N/a	—N/a	21	7
27	Shaun Pollock^	1996–2008	South Africa/Africa/ICC	16	5	0	21	1
30	Taijul Islam ǂ	2014–2026	Bangladesh	19	1	0	20	2
30	Kagiso Rabada ǂ	2014–2026	South Africa	18	2	0	20	4
30	Tim Southee	2008–2024	New Zealand	15	3	2	20	1
33	Brett Lee	1999–2012	Australia	10	9	0	19	0
33	Saqlain Mushtaq	1995–2004	Pakistan	13	6	—N/a	19	3
35	Jasprit Bumrah ǂ	2016–2026	India	16	2	0	18	0
35	Lance Gibbs^	1958–1976	West Indies	18	0	—N/a	18	2
35	Josh Hazlewood ǂ	2010–2026	Australia	15	3	0	18	0
35	Graeme Swann	2008–2013	England	17	1	0	18	3
39	Abdul Qadir	1977–1993	Pakistan	15	2	—N/a	17	5
39	Ravindra Jadeja ǂ	2009–2026	India	15	2	0	17	3
39	Fred Trueman^	1952–1965	England	17	—N/a	—N/a	17	3
39	Derek Underwood^	1966–1982	England	17	0	—N/a	17	6
39	Yasir Shah	2011–2022	Pakistan	16	1	0	17	3
44	Terry Alderman	1981–1991	Australia	14	2	—N/a	16	1
44	Richie Benaud^	1952–1964	Australia	16	—N/a	—N/a	16	1
44	Trent Boult	2011–2024	New Zealand	10	6	0	16	1
44	B. S. Chandrasekhar	1964–1979	India	16	0	—N/a	16	2
44	Graham McKenzie	1961–1971	Australia	16	—N/a	—N/a	16	3
44	Shoaib Akhtar	1998–2011	Pakistan/Asia/ICC	12	4	0	16	2
44	Chaminda Vaas	1994–2009	Sri Lanka/Asia	12	4	0	16	2
44	Bob Willis^	1971–1984	England	16	0	—N/a	16	0
52	Alec Bedser^	1946–1955	England	15	—N/a	—N/a	15	5
52	Pat Cummins ǂ	2011–2026	Australia	14	1	0	15	2
52	Danish Kaneria	2000–2010	Pakistan	15	0	—N/a	15	2
52	Mitchell Johnson	2007–2015	Australia	12	3	0	15	3
52	Craig McDermott	1984–1996	Australia	14	1	—N/a	15	2
52	Mehidy Hasan Miraz ǂ	2016–2026	Bangladesh	15	0	0	15	3
52	Kemar Roach ǂ	2008–2026	West Indies	12	3	0	15	1

== Women's international cricket ==
The first player to record a five-wicket haul in a Test innings was England's Myrtle Maclagan in the first innings of the first Test match ever played. The opponents were Australia. In the same match, two other players - Australian Anne Palmer and England's Mary Spear also recorded five-wicket hauls. As of December 2018, 13 cricketers have taken five-wicket hauls on Test debut. India's Neetu David holds the distinction of taking the highest number of wickets in Test innings - 8 wickets against England at Jamshedpur in 1995. Shubhangi Kulkarni and Mary Duggan have the joint highest five-wicket hauls in Test cricket, with 5 five-wicket hauls. Betty Wilson is the only woman cricketer with multiple 10 wicket hauls in a match.

Tina Macpherson and Glenys Page recorded the first five-wicket haul in Women's One Day International cricket (WODI) taking 5/14 and 6/20 against Young England and Trinidad and Tobago on 23 June 1973 - the first day of the inaugural Women's Cricket World Cup. Sajjida Shah has the best haul in WODI cricket, taking 7 wickets for 4 runs against Japan in 2003 in Amsterdam. Macpherson and Page are two of only five players to take a five-wicket haul during their WODI debut, the others being India's Purnima Choudhary, Laura Harper of England and Felicity Leydon-Davis from New Zealand.

The first five-wicket haul in a Women's Twenty20 International (WT20I) match was taken by New Zealand's Amy Satterthwaite against England on 16 August 2007. Satterthwaite took six wickets for 17 runs, the first six-wicket haul in the international format.

Most five-wicket hauls in women's cricket
Rank	Player	Period	Teams	Test	ODI	T20I	Total	10WH
1	Anisa Mohammed	2003–2022	West Indies	—N/a	6	3	9	—N/a
2	Katherine Brunt	2004–2023	England	3	5	0	8	0
3	Suné Luus ǂ	2012–2026	South Africa	0	5	2	7	—N/a
3	Deepti Sharma ǂ	2014–2026	India	1	4	2	7	0
5	Sophie Ecclestone ǂ	2016–2026	England	4	2	0	6	1
5	Cathryn Fitzpatrick	1991–2007	Australia	2	4	0	6	0
5	Jhulan Goswami	2002–2022	India	3	2	1	6	1
8	Mary Duggan	1949–1963	England	5	—N/a	—N/a	5	0
8	Shubhangi Kulkarni	1976–1991	India	5	0	—N/a	5	0
8	Jackie Lord	1966–1979	New Zealand	4	1	—N/a	5	1
8	Ellyse Perry ǂ	2007–2025	Australia	2	3	0	5	0

== See also ==
- List of cricketers with five-wicket hauls in all international formats
- List of cricketers who have taken five-wicket hauls on Test debut
- List of cricketers who have taken five-wicket hauls on One Day International debut
- List of cricketers who have taken five-wicket hauls on Women Test debut
