= List of international cricket five-wicket hauls by Nathan Lyon =

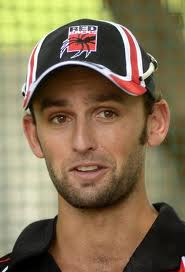
Australian off-spin bowler Nathan Lyon has taken 24 five-wicket hauls in Test cricket.

In cricket, a five-wicket haul (also known as a "five–for" or "fifer") refers to a bowler taking five or more wickets in a single innings. This is regarded as a notable achievement, and as of October 2024, only 54 bowlers have taken 15 or more five-wicket hauls at international level in their cricketing careers. Nathan Lyon is a right-arm off-spinner who has represented Australia in Tests, One Day Internationals (ODI), and Twenty20 Internationals (T20I). As of March 2024, Lyon has taken 24 five-wicket hauls for his country across 128 Tests, 29 ODIs, and 2 T20Is.

Lyon made his Test debut against Sri Lanka at the Galle International Stadium on 31 August 2011, and became the 30th Australian cricketer to take a five-wicket haul on Test debut, taking 5 wickets for 34 runs in the first innings. In Test matches, Lyon has been most successful against India, taking 9 of his 24 five-wicket hauls against them. His best figures in an innings of 8/50 came against the same team, taken at the M. Chinnaswamy Stadium, Bengaluru, on 4 March 2017. As of March 2024, his 527 wickets in Tests are the third-most for an Australian cricketer and seventh-highest across all cricketing nations.

Lyon's ODI debut was against Sri Lanka at the Adelaide Oval on 8 March 2012. As of March 2024, he is yet to take a five-wicket haul in the format, with his best figures being 4/44, taken against Zimbabwe at the Harare Sports Club on 31 August 2014. Lyon made his T20I debut against India on 29 January 2016 at the Melbourne Cricket Ground. His only wicket in the format, as of March 2024, was taken against Pakistan at the Dubai International Cricket Stadium on 28 October 2018.

As of March 2024, Lyon's tally of 24 five-wicket hauls is tied thirteenth (Note: He shares this position with Sydney Francis Barnes.) in the all-time list across all formats and is fourth in the equivalent list for Australia. He has taken twelve five-wicket hauls in Asia, the most by a visiting spinner there.

A ten-wicket haul occurs when a bowler takes ten wickets in either across two innings in a two-innings match or, rarely, in a single innings. As of March 2024, Lyon has taken ten wickets in a match five times in Tests and is one of 19 players to take 5 or more ten-wicket hauls.

== Key ==
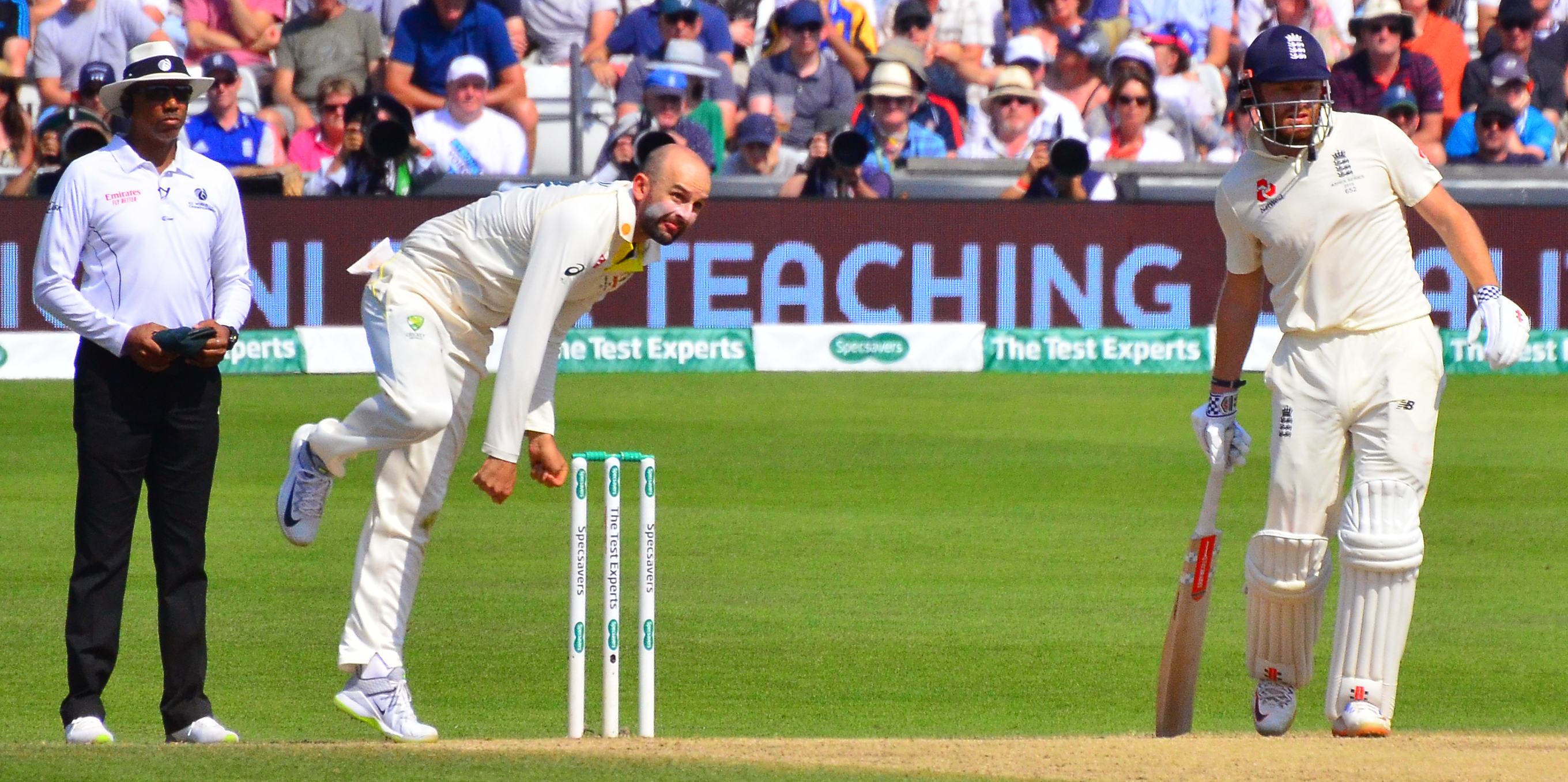
Lyon bowling during the third Ashes Test at Headingley in 2019

Symbol	Meaning
Date	Day the Test started
Inn	The innings of the match in which the five-wicket haul was taken
Overs	Number of overs bowled in that innings
Runs	Number of runs conceded
Wkts	Number of wickets taken
Batsmen	The batsmen whose wickets were taken in the five-wicket haul
Econ	Bowling economy rate (average runs per over)
Result	Result for Australia
†	10 wickets or more taken in the match
‡	Lyon was selected as man of the match

== Test five-wicket hauls ==
Five-wicket hauls in Tests by Nathan Lyon
No.	Date	Ground	Against	Inn	Overs	Runs	Wkts	Econ	Batsmen	Result
1	31 August 2011	Galle International Stadium, Galle	Sri Lanka	2	15	34	5	2.26	Kumar Sangakkara; Angelo Mathews; Rangana Herath; Suraj Randiv; Chanaka Welegedara	Won
2	15 April 2012	Queen's Park Oval, Port of Spain	West Indies	2	29	68	5	2.34	Narsingh Deonarine; Shivnarine Chanderpaul; Daren Sammy; Shane Shillingford; Kemar Roach	Drawn
3	22 March 2013	Feroz Shah Kotla Ground, Delhi	India	2	23.2	94	7	4.02	Cheteshwar Pujara; Virat Kohli; Ajinkya Rahane; Sachin Tendulkar; Ravichandran Ashwin; Ishant Sharma; Pragyan Ojha	Lost
4	26 December 2013	Melbourne Cricket Ground, Melbourne	England	3	17	50	5	2.94	Ian Bell; Ben Stokes; Tim Bresnan; Stuart Broad; Kevin Pietersen	Won
5	20 February 2014	St George's Park, Port Elizabeth	South Africa	1	46	130	5	2.82	Faf du Plessis; Dean Elgar; AB de Villiers; Wayne Parnell; JP Duminy	Lost
6	9 December 2014 †‡	Adelaide Oval, Adelaide	India	2	36	134	5	3.72	Cheteshwar Pujara; Ajinkya Rahane; Rohit Sharma; Wriddhiman Saha; Ishant Sharma	Won
7	9 December 2014 †‡	Adelaide Oval, Adelaide	India	4	34.1	152	7	4.44	Cheteshwar Pujara; Murali Vijay; Ajinkya Rahane; Rohit Sharma; Wriddhiman Saha; Virat Kohli; Ishant Sharma	Won
8	4 March 2017	M. Chinnaswamy Stadium, Bengaluru	India	1	22.2	50	8	2.23	Cheteshwar Pujara; Virat Kohli; Ajinkya Rahane; Ravichandran Ashwin; Wriddhiman Saha; Ravindra Jadeja; K. L. Rahul; Ishant Sharma	Lost
9	25 March 2017	Himachal Pradesh Cricket Association Stadium, Dharamshala	India	2	34.1	92	5	2.69	Cheteshwar Pujara; Karun Nair; Ajinkya Rahane; Ravichandran Ashwin; Kuldeep Yadav	Lost
10	27 August 2017	Sher-e-Bangla National Cricket Stadium, Dhaka	Bangladesh	3	34.3	82	6	2.37	Taijul Islam; Imrul Kayes; Shakib Al Hasan; Sabbir Rahman; Shafiul Islam; Mehedi Hasan	Lost
11	4 September 2017 †‡	Zohur Ahmed Chowdhury Stadium, Chattogram	Bangladesh	1	36.2	94	7	2.58	Tamim Iqbal; Imrul Kayes; Soumya Sarkar; Mominul Haque; Sabbir Rahman; Mushfiqur Rahim; Taijul Islam	Won
12	4 September 2017 †‡	Zohur Ahmed Chowdhury Stadium, Chattogram	Bangladesh	3	33	60	6	1.81	Tamim Iqbal; Imrul Kayes; Shakib Al Hasan; Sabbir Rahman; Mominul Haque; Taijul Islam	Won
13	6 December 2018	Adelaide Oval, Adelaide	India	3	42	122	6	2.90	Virat Kohli; Cheteshwar Pujara; Rohit Sharma; Rishabh Pant; Ajinkya Rahane; Mohammed Shami	Lost
14	14 December 2018 ‡	Perth Stadium, Perth	India	2	34.5	67	5	1.92	Ajinkya Rahane; Mohammed Shami; Ishant Sharma; Rishabh Pant; Jasprit Bumrah	Won
15	1 August 2019	Edgbaston Cricket Ground, Birmingham	England	4	20	49	6	2.45	Jason Roy; Joe Denly; Joe Root; Ben Stokes; Moeen Ali; Stuart Broad	Won
16	29 November 2019	Adelaide Oval, Adelaide	Pakistan	3	25	69	5	2.76	Shan Masood; Asad Shafiq; Iftikhar Ahmed; Yasir Shah; Shaheen Afridi	Won
17	3 January 2020 †	Sydney Cricket Ground, Sydney	New Zealand	2	30.4	68	5	2.21	Tom Blundell; Jeet Raval; William Somerville; Neil Wagner; Matt Henry	Won
18	3 January 2020 †	Sydney Cricket Ground, Sydney	New Zealand	4	16.5	50	5	2.97	Jeet Raval; Glenn Phillips; Colin de Grandhomme; Todd Astle; BJ Watling	Won
19	25 March 2022	Gaddafi Stadium, Lahore	Pakistan	4	37	83	5	2.24	Imam-ul-Haq; Azhar Ali; Babar Azam; Hasan Ali; Shaheen Afridi	Won
20	29 June 2022	Galle International Stadium, Galle	Sri Lanka	1	25	90	5	3.60	Dimuth Karunaratne; Angelo Mathews; Ramesh Mendis; Niroshan Dickwella; Lasith Embuldeniya	Won
21	30 November 2022	Perth Stadium, Perth	West Indies	4	42.5	128	6	2.98	Shamarh Brooks; Jermaine Blackwood; Kyle Mayers; Kraigg Brathwaite; Roston Chase; Kemar Roach	Won
22	17 February 2023	Arun Jaitley Cricket Stadium, Delhi	India	2	29	67	5	2.31	K. L. Rahul; Rohit Sharma; Cheteshwar Pujara; Shreyas Iyer; K. S. Bharat	Lost
23	1 March 2023 †‡	Holkar Stadium, Indore	India	3	23.3	64	8	2.72	Shubman Gill; Rohit Sharma; Ravindra Jadeja; K. S. Bharat; Ravichandran Ashwin; Cheteshwar Pujara; Umesh Yadav; Mohammed Siraj	Won
24	29 February 2024 †	Basin Reserve, Wellington	New Zealand	4	27	65	6	2.40	Tom Latham; Kane Williamson; Rachin Ravindra; Tom Blundell; Glenn Phillips; Tim Southee	Won

== Test ten-wicket hauls ==
Ten-wicket hauls in Tests by Nathan Lyon
No.	Figures	Against	Venue	Date	Result
1	12/286	India	Adelaide Oval, Adelaide	9 December 2014	Won
2	13/154	Bangladesh	Zohur Ahmed Chowdhury Stadium, Chattogram	4 September 2017	Won
3	10/118	New Zealand	Sydney Cricket Ground, Sydney	3 January 2020	Won
4	11/99	India	Holkar Stadium, Indore	1 March 2023	Won
5	10/108	New Zealand	Basin Reserve, Wellington	29 February 2024	Won
