= List of international cricket five-wicket hauls by Graeme Swann =

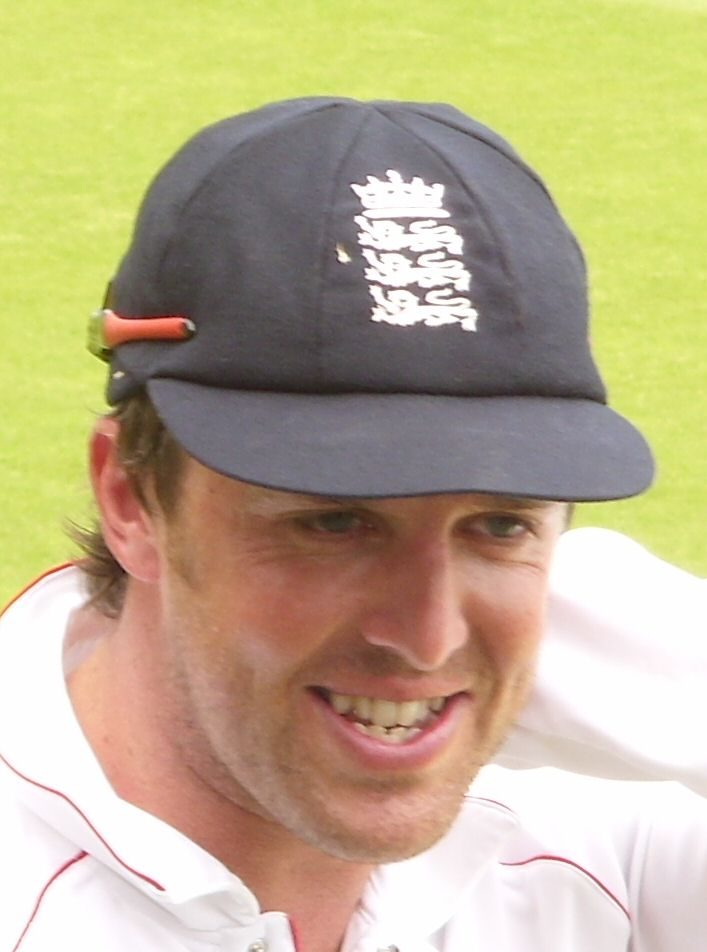
Graeme Swann's 18 five-wicket hauls in international cricket are the joint third highest for an English player along with James Anderson.

Graeme Swann, a right-arm off-spinner, represented the England cricket team in 60 Test matches, 79 One Day Internationals (ODI), and 39 Twenty20 Internationals (T20I) between 2000 and 2013. He took eighteen five-wicket hauls in international cricket – seventeen in Tests and one in ODIs. In cricket, a five-wicket haul (also known as a "five–for" or "fifer") refers to a bowler taking five or more wickets in a single innings. This is regarded as a notable achievement, and as of October 2024, only 54 bowlers have taken 15 or more five-wicket hauls at international level in their cricketing careers. The English cricket journalist Scyld Berry described Swann as "the best off-break bowler that England have had for more than half a century", and "the most effective spinner that England’s limited-overs teams have ever had". Swann claimed 255 wickets in Test cricket, second only to Derek Underwood (297) among English spin bowlers.

Swann made his Test debut in December 2008, taking four wickets in a match which England lost against India. His first Test five-wicket haul came early the following year against the West Indies at the Antigua Recreation Ground, when he took five wickets for 57 runs. Once during his career, Swann took five wickets in each innings of a match, against Bangladesh in 2010. This was also the first of three occasions in which he took ten wickets in a match. His career-best figures for an innings were six wickets for 65 runs against Pakistan at the Edgbaston Cricket Ground in August 2010.

In ODI cricket, Swann made his debut in January 2000 against South Africa, but off-field misdemeanours resulted in him being dropped from the team after just one match, and he did not play international cricket again until 2007. His solitary five-wicket haul in ODIs was against Australia in September 2009, a match England won by four wickets. Swann took five wickets for 28 runs in the match, and was given the man of the match award. He took 104 wickets in ODIs at an average of 27.76. Swann took 51 wickets in T20I cricket, but did not claim any five-wicket hauls; his best bowling figures in the format were three wickets for 13 runs. As of July 2015, his combined tally of 17 five-wicket hauls is twenty-seventh in the all-time list, a position he shares with Lance Gibbs.

== Key ==
Symbol	Meaning
Date	Day the Test started or ODI held
Inn	The innings of the match in which the five-wicket haul was taken
Overs	Number of overs bowled in that innings
Runs	Runs conceded
Wkts	Number of wickets taken
Econ	Runs conceded per over
Batsmen	The batsmen whose wickets were taken in the five-wicket haul
Result	The result for the England team in that match
*	One of two five-wicket hauls by Swann in a match
†	10 wickets or more taken in the match
‡	Swann selected as man of the match

== Tests ==
Five-wicket hauls in Test cricket by Graeme Swann
No.	Date	Ground	Against	Inn	Overs	Runs	Wkts	Econ	Batsmen	Result
1	15 February 2009	Antigua Recreation Ground, St. John's, Antigua and Barbuda	West Indies	2	24	57	5	2.37	Devon Smith; Daren Powell; Ramnaresh Sarwan; Denesh Ramdin; Sulieman Benn	Drawn
2	26 February 2009	Kensington Oval, Bridgetown, Barbados	West Indies	2	50.4	165	5	3.25	Devon Smith; Ryan Hinds; Brendan Nash; Denesh Ramdin; Jerome Taylor	Drawn
3	16 December 2009‡	SuperSport Park, Centurion	South Africa	1	45.2	110	5	2.42	Ashwell Prince; AB de Villiers; JP Duminy; Mark Boucher; Friedel de Wet	Drawn
4	26 December 2009 ‡	Kingsmead Cricket Ground, Durban	South Africa	3	21	54	5	2.57	Ashwell Prince; Graeme Smith; Hashim Amla; Morne Morkel; Dale Steyn	Won
5	12 March 2010 * † ‡	Zohur Ahmed Chowdhury Stadium, Chittagong	Bangladesh	2	29.3	90	5	3.05	Aftab Ahmed; Mahmudullah; Shakib Al Hasan; Mushfiqur Rahim; Rubel Hossain	Won
6	12 March 2010 * † ‡	Zohur Ahmed Chowdhury Stadium, Chittagong	Bangladesh	4	49	127	5	2.59	Tamim Iqbal; Junaid Siddique; Shakib Al Hasan; Mushfiqur Rahim; Naeem Islam	Won
7	4 June 2010	Old Trafford Cricket Ground, Manchester	Bangladesh	2	22.1	76	5	3.42	Junaid Siddique; Jahurul Islam; Shakib Al Hasan; Mushfiqur Rahim; Shahadat Hossain	Won
8	6 August 2010 ‡	Edgbaston Cricket Ground, Birmingham	Pakistan	3	37	65	6	1.75	Salman Butt; Azhar Ali; Umar Akmal; Umar Amin; Zulqarnain Haider; Saeed Ajmal	Won
9	26 August 2010 ‡	Lord's Cricket Ground, London	Pakistan	3	13.5	62	5	4.48	Salman Butt; Azhar Ali; Mohammad Amir; Wahab Riaz; Mohammad Asif	Won
10	3 December 2010	Adelaide Cricket Ground, Adelaide	Australia	3	41.1	91	5	2.21	Simon Katich; Ricky Ponting; Marcus North; Xavier Doherty; Peter Siddle	Won
11	18 August 2011	The Oval, London	India	3	38	106	6	2.78	Virender Sehwag; Rahul Dravid; Amit Mishra; Suresh Raina; Gautam Gambhir; Sreesanth	Won
12	26 March 2012	Galle International Stadium, Galle	Sri Lanka	3	30	82	6	2.73	Lahiru Thirimanne; Kumar Sangakkara; Mahela Jayawardene; Thilan Samaraweera; Suraj Randiv; Rangana Herath	Lost
13	3 April 2012 †	Paikiasothy Saravanamuttu Stadium, Colombo	Sri Lanka	3	40	106	6	2.65	Tillakaratne Dilshan; Kumar Sangakkara; Mahela Jayawardene; Thilan Samaraweera; Suraj Randiv; Prasanna Jayawardene	Won
14	15 November 2012	Sardar Patel Stadium, Ahmedabad	India	1	51	144	5	2.82	Gautam Gambhir; Virender Sehwag; Sachin Tendulkar; Virat Kohli; Mahendra Singh Dhoni	Lost
15	24 May 2013 †	Headingley, Leeds	New Zealand	4	32	90	6	2.81	Hamish Rutherford; Kane Williamson; Ross Taylor; Martin Guptill; Tim Southee; Doug Bracewell	Won
16	18 July 2013	Lord's Cricket Ground, London	Australia	2	21.3	44	5	2.04	Chris Rogers; Usman Khawaja; Steven Smith; Brad Haddin; Ryan Harris	Won
17	1 August 2013	Old Trafford Cricket Ground, Manchester	Australia	1	43	159	5	3.69	Chris Rogers; Usman Khawaja; Steven Smith; David Warner; Peter Siddle	Drawn

== One Day International ==
Five-wicket hauls in ODI cricket by Graeme Swann
No.	Date	Ground	Against	Inn	Overs	Runs	Wkts	Econ	Batsmen	Result
1	20 September 2009 ‡	Riverside Ground, Chester-le-Street	Australia	1	10	28	5	2.80	Ricky Ponting; Cameron White; James Hopes; Mitchell Johnson; Brett Lee	Won
