= List of international cricket five-wicket hauls by Allan Donald =

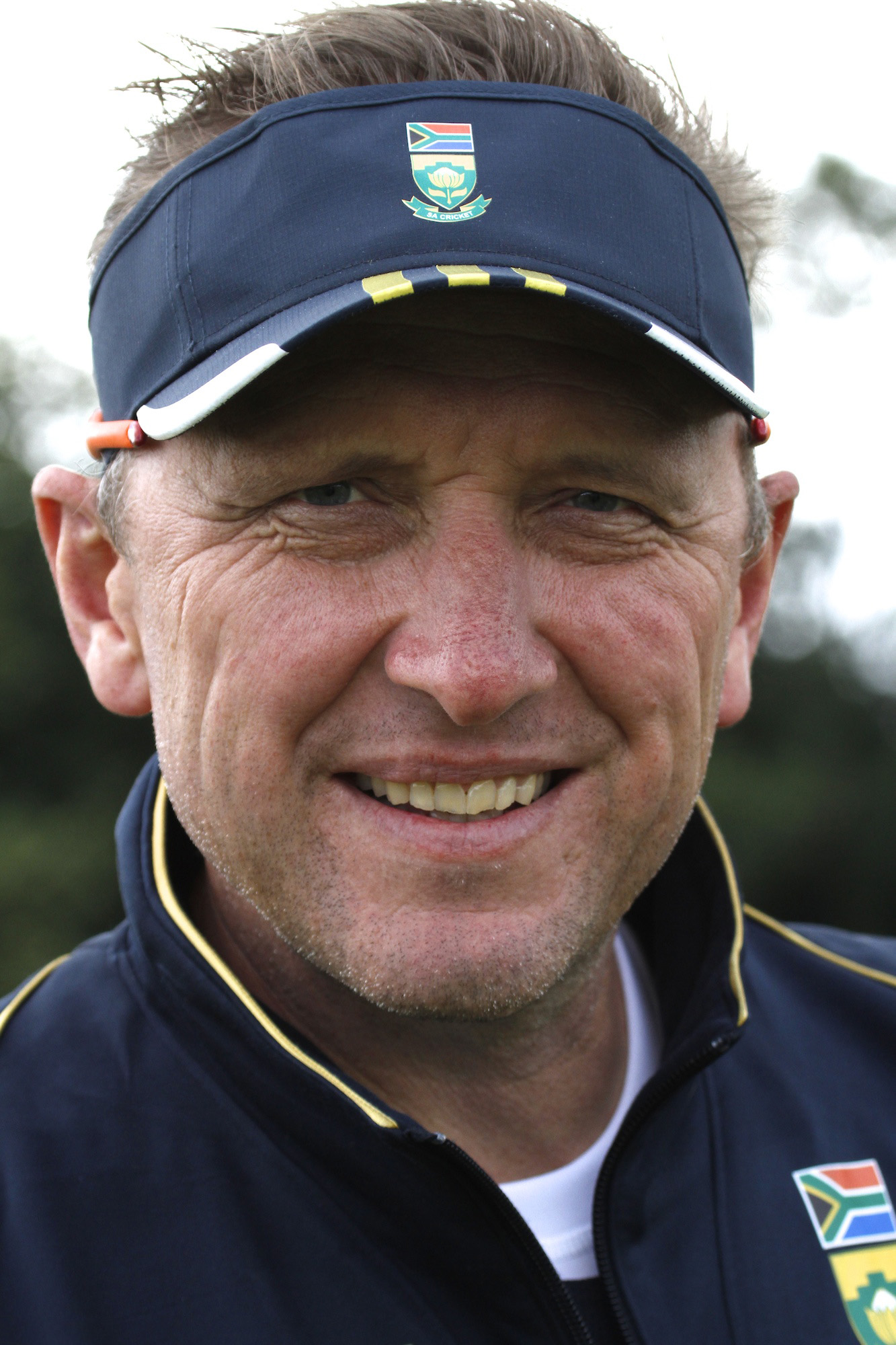
Donald's (pictured in 2012) average of 22.25 in Tests is the fourth-best among his countrymen as of August 2013. (Note: Records are calculated on the basis that a bowler should have delivered a minimum of 2000 balls.)

Allan Donald is a former Test and One Day International (ODI) cricketer who represented the South African cricket team between 1991, when the team's suspension from international cricket was lifted following the end of the apartheid regime, and 2003. A right-arm fast bowler, Donald was described by Cricinfo writer Peter Robinson as "South Africa's greatest fast bowler". Donald took 330 wickets in Test cricket and 272 in ODIs, and remains the second highest wicket-taker of his country in ODIs as of 2013. The Wisden Cricketers' Almanack named him one of their cricketers of the year in 1992 and rated him the second best ODI bowler in 2003. (Note: Donald was second only to Wasim Akram in the table.) During his international career, Donald took 22 five-wicket hauls. A five-wicket haul—also known as a five-for or fifer—refers to the feat of a bowler taking five or more wickets in a single innings. This is regarded as a notable achievement, and only 41 bowlers have at least 15 five-wicket hauls at international level in their cricketing careers. (Note: The five-wicket haul is defined by the cumulative sum of all formats of the game.)

Donald took a five-wicket haul in his ODI debut against India at the Eden Gardens, Kolkata in November 1991, taking 5 wickets for 29 runs, the fifth best performance by any bowler on ODI debut. Despite this South Africa lost the match, however, Donald secured a Man of the match award. He picked up another five-wicket haul in October 1996, against Kenya when he claimed 6 wickets for 23 runs at the Nairobi Gymkhana Club. The bowling figures are the second best by a South African as of 2013.

Donald made his Test debut against the West Indies in April 1992, collecting six wickets in the match. He took a five-wicket haul for the first time in Tests when he took 5 wickets for 55 runs against India during the third Test of a four-match series held later that year. He took another five wicket haul in the second innings, thus collecting 12 wickets for 139 runs in the match. Donald went on to repeat this feat against England in November 1999. His career-best bowling figures in an innings came when he took 8 wickets for 71 runs against Zimbabwe in 1995 at the Harare Sports Club. He was most successful against England, taking nine fifers. As of 2013, he is sixteenth overall among all-time combined five-wicket haul takers. (Note: Donald shares the position with Malcolm Marshall, Makhaya Ntini, Daniel Vettori and Dale Steyn.)

== Key ==
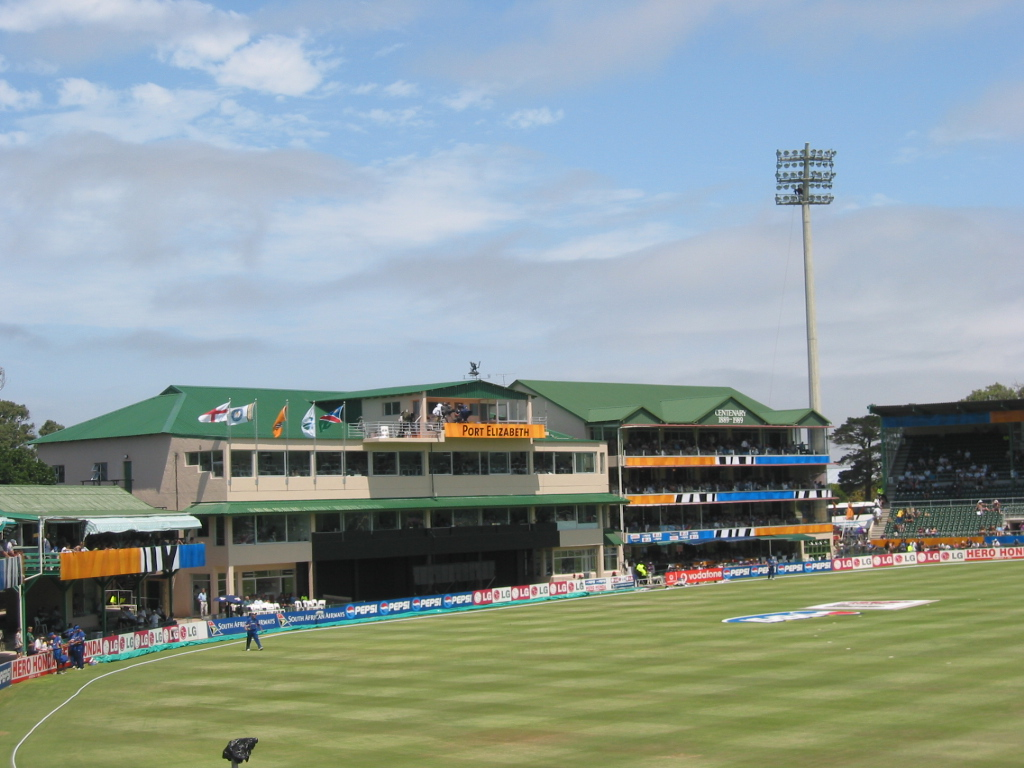
Donald took a pair of fifers for the first time at the St George's Oval, Port Elizabeth.

Symbol	Meaning
Date	Day the Test started or ODI held
Inn	Innings in which five-wicket haul was taken
Overs	Number of overs bowled
Runs	Number of runs conceded
Wkts	Number of wickets taken
Econ	Runs conceded per over
Batsmen	Batsmen whose wickets were taken
Result	Result for the South Africa team
*	One of two five-wicket hauls by Donald in a match
†	10 or more wickets taken in the match
‡	Donald was selected as man of the match

== Tests ==
List of five-wicket hauls by Allan Donald in Test cricket
No.	Date	Ground	Against	Inn	Overs	Runs	Wkts	Econ	Batsmen	Result
1	26 December 1992 * † ‡	St George's Park, Port Elizabeth	India	1	27	55	5	2.03	Woorkeri Raman; Sachin Tendulkar; Mohammad Azharuddin; Pravin Amre; Kiran More	Won
2	26 December 1992 * † ‡	St George's Park, Port Elizabeth	India	3	28	84	7	3.00	Woorkeri Raman; Sanjay Manjrekar; Mohammad Azharuddin; Kapil Dev; Manoj Prabhakar; Kiran More; Anil Kumble	Won
3	25 August 1993	Tyronne Fernando Stadium, Moratuwa	Sri Lanka	1	28	69	5	2.46	Chandika Hathurusingha; Asanka Gurusinha; Arjuna Ranatunga; Piyal Wijetunge; Pramodya Wickramasinghe	Drawn
4	21 July 1994	Lord's Cricket Ground, London	England	2	19.3	74	5	3.79	Michael Atherton; Alec Stewart; Craig White; Phil DeFreitas; Darren Gough	Won
5	13 October 1995 † ‡	Harare Sports Club, Harare	Zimbabwe	3	33	71	8	2.15	Grant Flower; David Houghton; Andy Flower; Guy Whittall; Craig Wishart; Paul Strang; Heath Streak; Charlie Lock	Won
6	2 January 1996 ‡	Newlands Cricket Ground, Cape Town	England	1	16	46	5	2.87	Michael Atherton; Graham Thorpe; Graeme Hick; Dominic Cork; Peter Martin	Won
7	26 December 1996	Kingsmead Cricket Ground, Durban	India	2	16	40	5	2.50	Vikram Rathour; Sachin Tendulkar; Nayan Mongia; Javagal Srinath; David Johnson	Won
8	21 March 1997 ‡	Centurion Park, Centurion	Australia	3	18	36	5	2.00	Mark Taylor; Matthew Elliott; Greg Blewett; Shane Warne; Jason Gillespie	Won
9	26 December 1997	Melbourne Cricket Ground, Melbourne	Australia	3	27	59	6	2.18	Matthew Elliott; Greg Blewett; Mark Waugh; Shane Warne; Michael Kasprowicz	Drawn
10	26 February 1998	Kingsmead Cricket Ground, Durban	Pakistan	1	19.2	79	5	4.08	Saeed Anwar; Mohammad Wasim; Yousuf Youhana; Azhar Mahmood; Waqar Younis	Lost
11	27 March 1998 ‡	Centurion Park, Centurion	Sri Lanka	3	13.3	54	5	4.00	Sanath Jayasuriya; Marvan Atapattu; Roshan Mahanama; Nuwan Zoysa; Muttiah Muralitharan	Won
12	18 June 1998	Lord's Cricket Ground, London	England	2	15.3	32	5	2.06	Steve James; Nasser Hussain; Dean Headley; Mark Ramprakash; Angus Fraser	Won
13	2 July 1998	Old Trafford, Manchester	England	3	40	88	6	2.20	Nick Knight; Alec Stewart; Mark Ramprakash; Graham Thorpe; Ashley Giles; Darren Gough	Drawn
14	23 July 1998	Trent Bridge, Nottingham	England	2	33	109	5	3.30	Mark Butcher; Michael Atherton; Ian Salisbury; Graeme Hick; Darren Gough	Lost
15	6 August 1998	Headingley Cricket Ground, Leeds	England	3	29.2	71	5	2.42	Michael Atherton; Graeme Hick; Andrew Flintoff; Dominic Cork; Darren Gough	Lost
16	10 December 1998	St George's Park, Port Elizabeth	West Indies	4	14.2	49	5	3.41	Clayton Lambert; Brian Lara; Floyd Reifer; Stuart Williams; Curtly Ambrose	Won
17	15 January 1999 ‡	Centurion Park, Centurion	West Indies	2	13	49	5	3.76	Philo Wallace; Brian Lara; Nixon McLean; Mervyn Dillon; Reon King	Won
18	25 November 1999 * † ‡	New Wanderers Stadium, Johannesburg	England	1	15	53	6	3.53	Mark Butcher; Michael Atherton; Alec Stewart; Chris Adams; Gavin Hamilton; Andy Caddick	Won
19	25 November 1999 * † ‡	New Wanderers Stadium, Johannesburg	England	3	23	74	5	3.21	Mark Butcher; Michael Vaughan; Alec Stewart; Chris Adams; Gavin Hamilton	Won
20	2 January 2000	Newlands Cricket Ground, Cape Town	England	1	26	47	5	1.80	Mark Butcher; Michael Atherton; Michael Vaughan; Alec Stewart; Andy Caddick	Won

== One Day Internationals ==
List of five-wicket hauls by Allan Donald in One Day Internationals
No.	Date	Ground	Against	Inn	Overs	Runs	Wkts	Econ	Batsmen	Result
1	10 November 1991 ‡	Eden Gardens, Kolkata	India	2	8.4	29	5	3.34	Ravi Shastri; Navjot Sidhu; Sanjay Manjrekar; Sachin Tendulkar; Pravin Amre	Lost
2	3 October 1996 ‡	Gymkhana Club Ground, Nairobi	Kenya	2	9	23	6	3.58	Dipak Chudasama; Maurice Odumbe; Thomas Odoyo; Aasif Karim; Tony Suji; Lameck Onyango	Won
