= List of international cricket five-wicket hauls by Josh Hazlewood =

In cricket, a five-wicket haul (also known as a "fifer") refers to a bowler taking five or more wickets in a single innings. This is regarded as a notable achievement, and as of December 2026, only 58 bowlers have taken 15 or more five-wicket hauls at international level in their cricketing careers.

Josh Hazlewood is a right-arm fast bowler who competes in Test, One Day International (ODI) and Twenty20 International (T20I) who represents Australia. Hazlewood has taken 301 wickets in Test matches, 142 wickets in ODIs and 79 wickets in T20Is. With 18 five-wicket hauls across all formats of the game, he ranks equal thirty-fifth among all-time combined five-wicket haul takers, and sixth in the equivalent list for Australia.

Hazlewood made his Test debut against India in 2014, in the second test of the series at the Gabba. His first five-wicket haul came in his first innings. His best bowling figures for an innings are 6 wickets for 49 runs against South Africa in 2026. In Test matches, Hazlewood is most successful against India, taking 4 of his 15 five-wicket hauls against them.

In 2010, Hazlewood made his ODI debut against England. He took his first five-wicket haul against South Africa in 2014. Hazlewood took 5 wickets for 31 runs in the match, which Australian lost by 3 wickets. His career best figures are 6 wickets for 52 runs against New Zealand in 2017.

Although Hazlewood made his first T20I appearance in 2013, he has not picked up a five-wicket haul in the format. Figures of 4 wickets for 12 runs against Sri Lanka in 2022 are his best in this version of the game.

== Key ==
Symbol	Meaning
Date	Day the Test started or ODI held
Inn	Innings in which five-wicket haul was taken
Overs	Number of overs bowled
Runs	Number of runs conceded
Wkts	Number of wickets taken
Econ	Runs conceded per over
Batsmen	Batsmen whose wickets were taken
Result	Result for the Australia team
*	One of two five wicket hauls by Hazlewood in a match
†	10 or more wickets taken in the match
‡	Hazlewood was selected as the man of the match

== Tests ==
Five-wicket hauls in Test cricket by Josh Hazlewood
No.	Date	Ground	Against	Inn	Overs	Runs	Wkts	Econ	Batsmen	Result
1	17 December 2014	The Gabba, Brisbane	India	1	23.2	68	5	2.91	Cheteshwar Pujara; Virat Kohli; Ajinkya Rahane; Ravichandran Ashwin; MS Dhoni	Won
2	11 June 2015	Sabina Park, Kingston	West Indies	2	15.5	38	5	2.40	Shane Dowrich; Denesh Ramdin; Jermaine Blackwood; Kemar Roach; Jerome Taylor	Won
3	27 November 2015 ‡	Adelaide Oval, Adelaide	New Zealand	3	24.5	70	6	2.81	Martin Guptill; Tom Latham; Ross Taylor; BJ Watling; Mark Craig; Trent Boult	Won
4	12 November 2016	Bellerive Oval, Hobart	South Africa	2	30.5	89	6	2.88	Faf du Plessis; Hashim Amla; Quinton de Kock; Keshav Maharaj; Kyle Abbott; Vernon Philander	Lost
5	4 March 2017	M. Chinnaswamy Stadium, Bangalore	India	3	24	67	6	2.79	Abhinav Mukund; Virat Kohli; Ravindra Jadeja; Cheteshwar Pujara; Ravichandran Ashwin; Umesh Yadav	Lost
6	14 December 2017	WACA Ground, Perth	England	3	18	48	5	2.66	Mark Stoneman; Alastair Cook; Jonny Bairstow; Dawid Malan; Craig Overton	Won
7	22 August 2019	Headingley Cricket Ground, Leeds	England	2	12.5	30	5	2.33	Jason Roy; Joe Root; Jonny Bairstow; Jos Buttler; Jack Leach	Lost
8	17 December 2020	Adelaide Oval, Adelaide	India	3	5	8	5	1.60	Mayank Agarwal; Ajinkya Rahane; Wriddhiman Saha; Ravichandran Ashwin; Hanuma Vihari	Won
9	15 January 2021	The Gabba, Brisbane	India	2	24.4	57	5	2.31	Cheteshwar Pujara; Mayank Agarwal; Rishabh Pant; Navdeep Saini; Mohammed Siraj	Lost
10	19 July 2023	Old Trafford Cricket Ground, Manchester	England	2	27	126	5	4.66	Joe Root; Harry Brook; Chris Woakes; Mark Wood; Stuart Broad	Draw
11	17 January 2024	Adelaide Oval, Adelaide	West Indies	3	14	35	5	2.50	Tagenarine Chanderpaul; Kraigg Brathwaite; Alick Athanaze; Kavem Hodge; Gudakesh Motie	Won
12	8 March 2024	Hagley Oval, Christchurch	New Zealand	1	13.2	31	5	2.32	Tom Latham; Rachin Ravindra; Daryl Mitchell; Kane Williamson; Matt Henry	Won
13	25 June 2025	Kensington Oval, Bridgetown	West Indies	4	12	43	5	3.58	John Campbell; Brandon King; Roston Chase; Keacy Carty; Jomel Warrican	Won
14	13 August 2026	Marrara Oval, Darwin	Bangladesh	2	28	89	6	3.17	Mominul Haque; Najmul Hossain Shanto; Hasan Mahmud; Taijul Islam; Mehidy Hasan Miraz; Ebadot Hossain	Lost
15	9 October 2026	Kingsmead Cricket Ground, Durban	South Africa	4	16.5	49	6	2.91	Ryan Rickelton; David Bedingham; Wiaan Mulder; Marco Jansen; Simon Harmer; Anrich Nortje	Won

== One Day Internationals ==
Five-wicket hauls in ODI cricket by Josh Hazlewood
No.	Date	Ground	Against	Inn	Overs	Runs	Wkts	Econ	Batsmen	Result
1	16 November 2014	WACA Ground, Perth	South Africa	2	9.4	31	5	3.20	Quinton de Kock; Faf du Plessis; Farhaan Behardien; AB de Villiers; Vernon Philander	Lost
2	26 June 2016	Kensington Oval, Bridgetown	West Indies	2	9.4	50	5	5.17	Andre Fletcher; Carlos Brathwaite; Denesh Ramdin; Sunil Narine; Sulieman Benn	Won
3	2 June 2017	Edgbaston Cricket Ground, Birmingham	New Zealand	1	9	52	6	5.77	Martin Guptill; Neil Broom; James Neesham; Adam Milne; Mitchell Santner; Trent Boult	No result
