= List of international cricket five-wicket hauls by Stuart Broad =

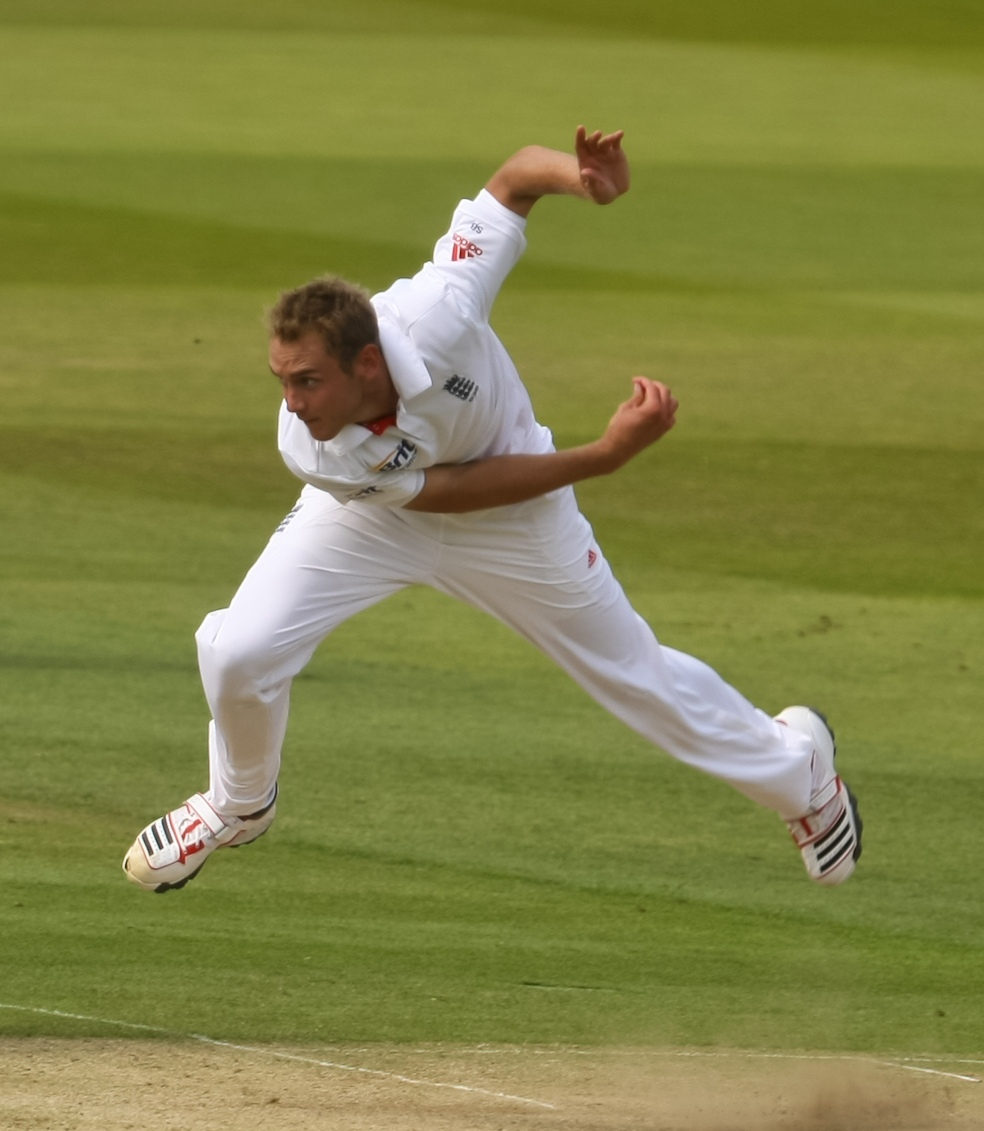
Stuart Broad has taken twenty-one five-wicket hauls in international cricket.

In cricket, a five-wicket haul (also known as a "fifer") refers to a bowler taking five or more wickets in a single innings. This is regarded as a notable achievement, and as of July 2020 only as of October 2024, only 54 bowlers have taken 15 or more five-wicket hauls at international level in their cricketing careers. Stuart Broad—a right-arm fast-medium bowler—is a former Test, One Day International (ODI) and Twenty20 International (T20I) cricketer who represented England. Broad has taken 604 wickets in Test matches, 178 wickets in ODIs and 65 wickets in T20Is. As of July 2023, Broad has 21 five-wicket hauls across all formats in his international career and ranks twenty-eighth in the all-time list, and fourth in the equivalent list for England.

Broad made his Test debut against Sri Lanka during England's tour in 2007 with bowling figures of one wicket for 77 runs. His first five-wicket haul came against the West Indies during the first Test of the 2008–09 series at Sabina Park, taking five wickets for 85 runs in the first innings. His best bowling figures are eight wickets for 15 runs which he took in the first innings of the fourth and decisive Test of the 2015 Ashes series at Trent Bridge. Securing the five wickets in 19 deliveries, Broad equalled the fastest five-wicket haul in Test history, set in 1947 by Ernie Toshack for Australia against India, and recorded the best Test bowling figures ever at Trent Bridge, surpassing Muttiah Muralitharan's eight for 70 against England in June 2006. Broad has been most successful against Australia, taking eight Test five-wicket hauls.

Broad made his ODI debut against Pakistan during the latter's tour of England and Scotland in 2006. He took the only wicket of the second innings, that of Shoaib Malik, in a rain-curtailed match. His only five-wicket haul in the ODI format came against South Africa in 2008. Broad took five wickets for 23 runs in the match, which England won by 10 wickets. The performance earned him the man-of-the-match award. Broad made his first T20I appearance in 2008 and is yet to take a five-wicket haul in the format as of July 2020. His figures of four wickets for 24 runs against New Zealand in Auckland in 2013 remain his best in this variant of the game.

== Key ==
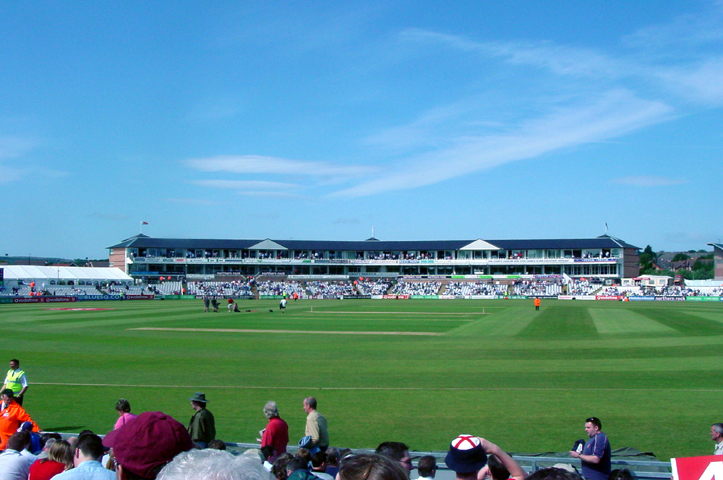
Broad took two five-wicket hauls at the Riverside Ground (pictured) in a Test match in 2013.

Key
Symbol	Meaning
Date	Day the Test started or ODI held
Inn	Innings in which five-wicket haul was taken
Overs	Number of overs bowled
Runs	Number of runs conceded
Wkts	Number of wickets taken
Econ	Runs conceded per over
Batsmen	Batsmen whose wickets were taken
Result	Result for the England team
*	One of two five wicket hauls by Broad in a match
†	10 or more wickets taken in the match
‡	Broad was selected as man of the match

== Tests ==
Five-wicket hauls in Test cricket by Stuart Broad
No.	Date	Ground	Against	Inn	Overs	Runs	Wkts	Econ	Batsmen	Result
1	4 February 2009	(Jamaica) Sabina Park, Kingston	West Indies	2	29	85	5	2.93	Chris Gayle; Xavier Marshall; Shivnarine Chanderpaul; Brendan Nash; Sulieman Benn	Lost
2	7 August 2009	(England) Headingley, Leeds	Australia	2	25.1	91	6	3.61	Ricky Ponting; Michael Hussey; Marcus North; Mitchell Johnson; Peter Siddle; Stuart Clark	Lost
3	20 August 2009 ‡	(England) The Oval, London	Australia	2	12	37	5	3.08	Shane Watson; Ricky Ponting; Michael Hussey; Michael Clarke; Brad Haddin	Won
4	29 July 2011 ‡	(England) Trent Bridge, Nottingham	India	2	24.1	46	6	1.90	Sachin Tendulkar; Yuvraj Singh; Mahendra Singh Dhoni; Harbhajan Singh; Praveen Kumar	Won
5	17 May 2012 † ‡	(England) Lord's, London	West Indies	1	24.5	72	7	2.89	Adrian Barath; Marlon Samuels; Denesh Ramdin; Darren Sammy; Kemar Roach; Fidel Edwards; Shannon Gabriel	Won
6	2 August 2012	(England) Headingley, Leeds	South Africa	3	16.4	69	5	4.14	AB de Villiers; Jacques Kallis; JP Duminy; Vernon Philander; Morné Morkel	Drawn
7	14 March 2013	(New Zealand) Basin Reserve, Wellington	New Zealand	2	17.2	51	6	2.94	Hamish Rutherford; Kane Williamson; Ross Taylor; BJ Watling; Neil Wagner; Trent Boult	Drawn
8	16 May 2013 ‡	(England) Lord's, London	New Zealand	2	11	44	7	4.00	Peter Fulton; Hamish Rutherford; Kane Williamson; Ross Taylor; Brendon McCullum; Tim Southee; Bruce Martin	Won
9	9 August 2013 * † ‡	(England) Riverside Ground, Chester-le-Street	Australia	2	24.3	71	5	2.89	David Warner; Usman Khawaja; Michael Clarke; Shane Watson; Ryan Harris	Won
10	9 August 2013 * † ‡	(England) Riverside Ground, Chester-le-Street	Australia	4	18.3	50	6	2.70	Michael Clarke; Steve Smith; Brad Haddin; Peter Siddle; Ryan Harris; Nathan Lyon	Won
11	21 November 2013	(Australia) Brisbane Cricket Ground, Brisbane	Australia	1	24	81	6	3.37	Chris Rogers; David Warner; Shane Watson; Michael Clarke; Mitchell Johnson; Ryan Harris	Lost
12	7 August 2014	(England) Old Trafford Cricket Ground, Manchester	India	1	13.4	25	6	1.82	Gautam Gambhir; Cheteshwar Pujara; Mahendra Singh Dhoni; Ravichandran Ashwin; Bhuvneshwar Kumar; Pankaj Singh	Won
13	29 May 2015	(England) Headingley Cricket Ground, Leeds	New Zealand	1	17.1	109	5	6.34	Tom Latham; Ross Taylor; Luke Ronchi; Matt Henry; Trent Boult	Lost
14	6 August 2015 ‡	(England) Trent Bridge, Nottingham	Australia	1	9.3	15	8	1.57	Chris Rogers; Steve Smith; Shaun Marsh; Michael Clarke; Adam Voges; Mitchell Johnson; Mitchell Starc; Nathan Lyon	Won
15	14 January 2016 ‡	(South Africa) Wanderers Stadium, Johannesburg	South Africa	3	12.1	17	6	1.39	Dean Elgar; Stiaan van Zyl; AB de Villiers; Hashim Amla; Temba Bavuma; Faf du Plessis	Won
16	30 March 2018	(New Zealand) Hagley Oval, Christchurch	New Zealand	2	22.3	54	6	2.40	Tom Latham; Ross Taylor; Henry Nicholls; Colin de Grandhomme; Ish Sodhi; Trent Boult	Drawn
17	1 August 2019	(England) Edgbaston Cricket Ground, Birmingham	Australia	1	22.4	86	5	3.79	David Warner; Cameron Bancroft; Tim Paine; James Pattinson; Steve Smith	Lost
18	24 July 2020 † ‡	(England) Old Trafford Cricket Ground, Manchester	West Indies	2	14	31	6	2.21	Kraigg Brathwaite; Roston Chase; Jason Holder; Rahkeem Cornwall; Kemar Roach; Shane Dowrich	Won
19	5 January 2022	(Australia) Sydney Cricket Ground, Sydney	Australia	1	29	101	5	3.48	David Warner; Steve Smith; Cameron Green; Pat Cummins; Usman Khawaja	Drawn
20	1 June 2023	(England) Lord's, London	Ireland	1	17	51	5	3.00	James McCollum; Peter Moor; Andrew Balbirnie; Harry Tector; Mark Adair	Won

== One Day Internationals ==
Five-wicket hauls in ODI cricket by Stuart Broad
No.	Date	Ground	Against	Inn	Overs	Runs	Wkts	Econ	Batsmen	Result
1	26 August 2008 ‡	(England) Trent Bridge, Nottingham	South Africa	1	10	23	5	2.30	Graeme Smith; Herschelle Gibbs; Jacques Kallis; JP Duminy; Johan Botha	Won
