= List of international cricket five-wicket hauls by Shaun Pollock =

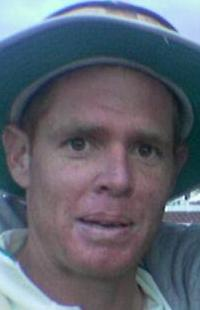
Shaun Pollock pictured in 2005

Shaun Pollock is a former South African cricketer who took 21 five-wicket hauls during his career in international cricket. A five-wicket haul (also known as a "five–for" or "fifer") refers to a bowler taking five or more wickets in a single innings. This is regarded as a notable achievement, and as of October 2024, only 54 bowlers have taken 15 or more five-wicket hauls at international level in their cricketing careers. (Note: The five-wicket haul is defined by the accumulative sum of all formats of the game.) With 829 wickets at the international level, Pollock is South Africa's most prolific wicket-taker. The Wisden Cricketers' Almanack described him as "one of the most balanced cricketers to represent South Africa in the modern era" and named him one of their "Cricketers of the Year" alongside four other players in 2003. With fellow cricketer Allan Donald, he formed a formidable bowling partnership and the duo were mainly responsible for many of South Africa's key victories in the late 1990s.

Pollock made his Test debut against England in November 1995. He picked up his first five-wicket haul during the fifth match of the same series. In January 1998, Pollock took a career-best figure of 7 wickets for 87 runs against Australia, bowling 41 overs. His figures of 6 wickets for 30 runs, against Sri Lanka, in January 2001 are the best by a South African captain. In Tests, he has taken fifers against all cricketing nations with the exception of Bangladesh, and is most successful against West Indies with four fifers.

Pollock's One Day International (ODI) debut was against England in January 1996, capturing four wickets for 34 runs and was named "Man of the match". However, it took another three years to pick up a fifer, this time against the West Indies when he picked up six wickets for 35 runs in a math which South Africa lost. With five fifers in ODIs, he has the highest number of fifers than any other South African bowler, and ninth in the all-time list. Pollock played 12 Twenty20 Internationals between 2005 and 2008. He never managed to take a fifer in this format; his best bowling figures remain 3 wickets for 28 runs.

== Key ==
Symbol	Meaning
Date	Day the Test started or ODI held
Inn	Innings in which five-wicket haul was taken
Overs	Number of overs bowled
Runs	Number of runs conceded
Wkts	Number of wickets taken
Econ	Runs conceded per over
Batsmen	Batsmen whose wickets were taken
Result	Result for the South Africa team
†	10 or more wickets taken in the match
‡	Pollock was selected as man of the match

== Tests ==
No.	Date	Ground	Against	Inn	Overs	Runs	Wkts	Econ	Batsmen	Result
1	2 January 1996	Newlands Cricket Ground, Cape Town	England	3	15.5	32	5	2.02	Alec Stewart; Graeme Hick; Jack Russell; Dominic Cork; Peter Martin	Won
2	24 October 1997	Iqbal Stadium, Faisalabad	Pakistan	4	11	37	5	3.36	Ali Naqvi; Saeed Anwar; Ijaz Ahmed; Inzamam-ul-Haq; Waqar Younis	Won
3	30 January 1998 ‡	Adelaide Oval, Adelaide	Australia	2	41	87	7	2.12	Matthew Elliott; Greg Blewett; Mark Waugh; Steve Waugh; Ian Healy; Andy Bichel; Shane Warne	Drawn
4	26 February 1998	Kingsmead Cricket Ground, Durban	Pakistan	3	22.3	50	6	2.22	Saeed Anwar; Mohammad Yousuf; Moin Khan; Azhar Mahmood; Waqar Younis; Fazl-e-Akbar	Lost
5	6 August 1998	Headingley, Leeds	England	3	35	53	5	1.51	Mark Butcher; Nasser Hussain; Alec Stewart; Mark Ramprakash; Ian Salisbury	Lost
6	26 November 1998 ‡	The Wanderers Stadium, Johannesburg	West Indies	1	23	54	5	2.34	Clayton Lambert; Philo Wallace; Brian Lara; Nixon McLean; Curtly Ambrose	Won
7	10 December 1998 ‡	St George's Park, Port Elizabeth	West Indies	2	13.3	43	5	3.18	Clayton Lambert; Shivnarine Chanderpaul; Floyd Reifer; Curtly Ambrose; Mervyn Dillon	Won
8	26 December 1998	Kingsmead Cricket Ground, Durban	West Indies	3	27	83	5	3.07	Shivnarine Chanderpaul; Carl Hooper; Darren Ganga; Franklyn Rose; Curtly Ambrose	Won
9	18 March 1999	Basin Reserve, Wellington	New Zealand	1	28.3	33	5	1.15	Matthew Horne; Chris Harris; Adam Parore; Dion Nash; Simon Doull	Won
10	29 October 1999	Chevrolet Park, Bloemfontein	Zimbabwe	1	21	39	5	1.85	Grant Flower; Murray Goodwin; Alistair Campbell; Andy Flower; Bryan Strang	Won
11	2 January 2001 ‡	Newlands Cricket Ground, Cape Town	Sri Lanka	1	13.4	30	6	2.19	Marvan Atapattu; Sanath Jayasuriya; Mahela Jayawardene; Russell Arnold; Nuwan Zoysa; Muttiah Muralitharan	Won
12	19 April 2001	Sabina Park, Kingston	West Indies	1	26.5	28	5	1.04	Brian Lara; Carl Hooper; Ridley Jacobs; Cameron Cuffy: Courtney Walsh	Lost
13	3 November 2001 † ‡	Chevrolet Park, Bloemfontein	India	3	21.4	56	6	2.58	Rahul Dravid; VVS Laxman; Virender Sehwag; Deep Dasgupta; Javagal Srinath; Zaheer Khan	Won
14	16 November 2001	Port Elizabeth	India	2	16	40	5	2.50	Shiv Sunder Das; Rahul Dravid; Sachin Tendulkar; Sourav Ganguly; VVS Laxman	Drawn
15	14 August 2003	Trent Bridge, Nottingham	England	3	17.4	39	6	2.20	Marcus Trescothick; Michael Vaughan; Nasser Hussain; Andrew Flintoff; Ashley Giles; James Anderson	Lost
16	24 October 2003	Iqbal Stadium, Faisalabad	Pakistan	2	29.2	78	6	2.65	Imran Farhat; Yasir Hameed; Inzamam-ul-Haq; Shoaib Malik; Mushtaq Ahmed; Danish Kaneria	Drawn

== One Day Internationals ==
Five-wicket hauls in One Day Internationals
No.	Date	Ground	Against	Inn	Overs	Runs	Wkts	Econ	Batsmen	Result
1	24 January 1999	Buffalo Park, East London	West Indies	1	10	35	6	3.50	Philo Wallace; Shivnarine Chanderpaul; Nixon McLean; Brian Lara; Keith Semple; Curtly Ambrose	Lost
2	17 June 1999	Edgbaston Cricket Ground, Birmingham	Australia	1	9.2	36	5	3.85	Mark Waugh; Steve Waugh; Michael Bevan; Tom Moody; Shane Warne	Tie
3	13 February 2000 ‡	The Wanderers Stadium, Johannesburg	England	2	9	20	5	2.22	Nasser Hussain; Nick Knight; Graeme Hick; Darren Maddy; Mark Alleyne	Won
4	October 10, 2001	SuperSport Park, Centurion	India	1	9.5	37	5	3.76	Sourav Ganguly; Shiv Sunder Das; Rahul Dravid; Harbhajan Singh; Javagal Srinath	Lost
5	14 February 2007 ‡	New Wanderers Stadium, Johannesburg	Pakistan	1	10	23	5	2.30	Mohammad Hafeez; Imran Nazir; Younis Khan; Mohammad Yousuf; Inzamam-ul-Haq	Won
