= List of international cricket five-wicket hauls by Kapil Dev =

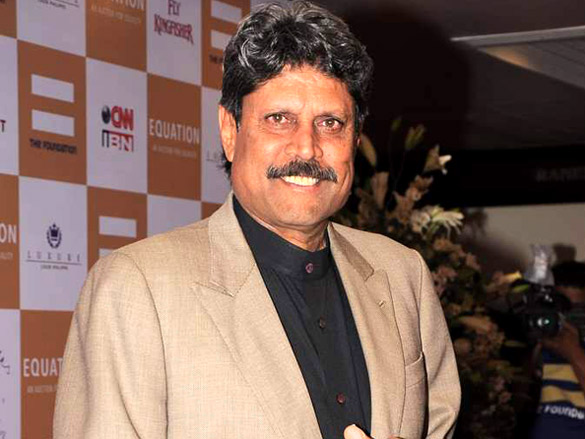
Kapil Dev is India's third highest wicket-taker in Test cricket.

Kapil Dev is a former Test and One Day International (ODI) cricketer who represented India between 1978 and 1994. He took 24 five-wicket hauls during his international career. In cricket, a five-wicket haul—also known as a five-for or fifer—refers to a bowler taking five or more wickets in a single innings. This is regarded as a notable achievement, and as of October 2024, only 54 bowlers have taken 15 or more five-wicket hauls at international level in their cricketing careers. (Note: The five-wicket haul is defined by the accumulative sum of all formats of the game.) A right-arm fast bowler, Kapil Dev took 434 wickets in Test cricket and 253 in ODIs. With 23 five-wicket hauls in Tests, he has the third highest number of international five-wicket hauls among Indian cricketers as of 2012, after Anil Kumble and Harbhajan Singh. (Note: Records correct as of 9 June 2012.) Kapil Dev was named by the Wisden as one of their Cricketers of the Year in 1983 and Indian Cricketer of the Century in 2002. Eight years later, the International Cricket Council (ICC) inducted him into the ICC Cricket Hall of Fame. As of 2012, Kapil Dev also holds the record for being the only player to have taken more than 400 wickets and scored over 5,000 runs in Tests.

Kapil Dev made his Test and ODI debuts against Pakistan, both in 1978. His first five-wicket haul came a year later against England during the first Test of India's tour. His career-best bowling figures in an innings of nine for 83 was achieved in 1983 against the West Indies in Ahmedabad. (Note: Bowling figures are given in the form of nine for 83; the first figure refers to the quantity of wickets the bowler took in the innings and the second figure shows how many runs he gave away. In this case, Kapil Dev took nine wickets and conceded 83 runs.) In Tests, Kapil Dev was most successful against Pakistan and Australia, with seven five-wicket hauls against each of them. He took his only five-wicket haul in ODIs against Australia during the 1983 Cricket World Cup.

After playing for nearly 16 years, Kapil Dev retired from international cricket in 1994. At the time of his retirement, he held the world record for the most wickets taken in Test and ODI cricket; both records were subsequently broken by Courtney Walsh and Wasim Akram respectively. His combined tally of 24 five-wicket hauls is eleventh in the all-time list in 2012, a record jointly held with Sydney Barnes, Imran Khan and Dennis Lillee.

== Key ==
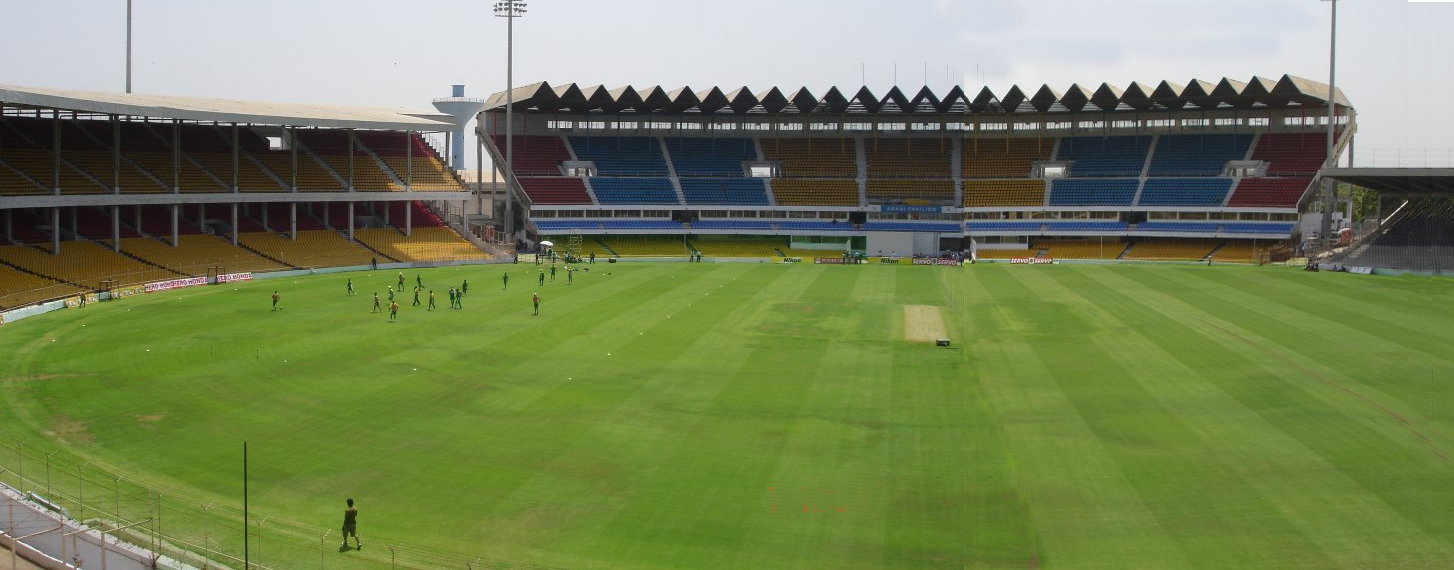
Motera Stadium, Ahmedabad, where Kapil Dev took 9 wickets for 83 runs in an innings against West Indies

Symbol	Meaning
Date	Day the Test started or ODI held
Inn	Innings in which five-wicket haul was taken
Overs	Number of overs bowled
Runs	Number of runs conceded
Wkts	Number of wickets taken
Econ	Runs conceded per over
Batsmen	Batsmen whose wickets were taken
Result	Result for the India team
†	Kapil Dev was man of the match
‡	10 or more wickets taken in the match

== Tests ==
Five-wicket hauls in Test cricket
No.	Date	Ground	Against	Inn	Overs	Runs	Wkts	Econ	Batsmen	Result
1	12 July 1979	Edgbaston Cricket Ground, Birmingham	England	1	48	146	5	3.04	Mike Brearley; Geoffrey Boycott; Derek Randall; Graham Gooch; Ian Botham	Lost
2	13 October 1979	Feroz Shah Kotla Ground, Delhi	Australia	2	32	82	5	2.56	Rick Darling; Allan Border; Kim Hughes; Rodney Hogg; Geoff Dymock	Drawn
3	26 October 1979	Eden Gardens, Calcutta (Note: Calcutta has since been renamed as Kolkata.)	Australia	1	32	74	5	2.31	Andrew Hilditch; Allan Border; Kim Hughes; Dav Whatmore; Jim Higgs	Drawn
4	4 December 1979	Feroz Shah Kotla Ground, Delhi	Pakistan	1	23.5	58	5	2.43	Majid Khan; Mudassar Nazar; Zaheer Abbas; Wasim Raja; Wasim Bari	Drawn
5	25 December 1979	Green Park Stadium, Kanpur	Pakistan	2	28	63	6	2.25	Mudassar Nazar; Zaheer Abbas; Javed Miandad; Majid Khan; Iqbal Qasim; Sikander Bakht	Drawn
6	15 January 1980 ‡	M. A. Chidambaram Stadium, Madras (Note: Madras has since been renamed as Chennai.)	Pakistan	3	23.4	56	7	2.36	Mudassar Nazar; Sadiq Mohammad; Zaheer Abbas; Asif Iqbal; Imran Khan; Wasim Bari; Sikander Bakht	Won
7	2 January 1981	Sydney Cricket Ground, Sydney	Australia	2	36.1	97	5	2.68	Graeme Wood; John Dyson; Kim Hughes; Allan Border; Jim Higgs	Lost
8	7 February 1981	Melbourne Cricket Ground, Melbourne	Australia	4	16.4	28	5	1.68	Bruce Yardley; Allan Border; Rod Marsh; Dennis Lillee; Jim Higgs	Won
9	27 November 1981 †	Wankhede Stadium, Bombay (Note: Bombay has since been renamed as Mumbai.)	England	4	13.2	70	5	5.25	Graham Gooch; Chris Tavaré; David Gower; Ian Botham; Bob Willis	Won
10	1 January 1982	Eden Gardens, Calcutta	England	1	31	91	6	2.93	Geoffrey Boycott; Chris Tavaré; Ian Botham; Derek Underwood; Mike Gatting; John Emburey	Drawn
11	10 June 1982 †	Lord's Cricket Ground, London	England	1	43	125	5	2.90	Geoff Cook; Chris Tavaré; Allan Lamb; David Gower; Derek Randall	Lost
12	17 September 1982	M. A. Chidambaram Stadium, Madras	Sri Lanka	3	24.3	110	5	4.48	Bandula Warnapura; Ravi Ratnayeke; Anura Ranasinghe; Mahes Goonatilleke; Ajit de Silva	Drawn
13	23 December 1982	National Stadium, Karachi	Pakistan	2	28.5	102	5	3.53	Zaheer Abbas; Mudassar Nazar; Imran Khan; Abdul Qadir; Sarfraz Nawaz	Lost
14	3 January 1983	Iqbal Stadium, Faisalabad	Pakistan	2	38.4	220	7	5.68	Mohsin Khan; Mudassar Nazar; Mansoor Akhtar; Saleem Malik; Wasim Bari; Sarfraz Nawaz; Sikander Bakht	Lost
15	23 January 1983 †	Gaddafi Stadium, Lahore	Pakistan	1	30.5	85	8	2.75	Mohsin Khan; Majid Khan; Zaheer Abbas; Imran Khan; Wasim Bari; Sarfraz Nawaz; Abdul Qadir; Iqbal Qasim	Drawn
16	14 September 1983	Chinnaswamy Stadium, Bangalore	Pakistan	2	29	68	5	2.34	Mudassar Nazar; Saleem Malik; Wasim Bari; Tahir Naqqash; Azeem Hafeez	Drawn
17	29 October 1983	Feroz Shah Kotla Ground, Delhi	West Indies	2	31	77	6	2.48	Desmond Haynes; Vivian Richards; Clive Lloyd; Gus Logie; Jeff Dujon; Malcolm Marshall	Drawn
18	12 November 1983 ‡	Motera Stadium, Ahmedabad	West Indies	3	30.3	83	9	2.72	Gordon Greenidge; Vivian Richards; Larry Gomes; Clive Lloyd; Gus Logie; Jeff Dujon; Malcolm Marshall; Michael Holding; Wayne Daniel	Lost
19	13 December 1985 †	Adelaide Oval, Adelaide	Australia	1	38	106	8	2.78	Wayne Phillips; David Boon; Allan Border; Greg Ritchie; Greg Matthews; Craig McDermott; Bruce Reid; Merv Hughes	Drawn
20	15 April 1989	Queen's Park Oval, Port of Spain	West Indies	3	25	58	5	2.32	Richie Richardson; Keith Arthurton; Malcolm Marshall; Curtly Ambrose; Courtney Walsh	Lost
21	28 April 1989	Sabina Park, Kingston	West Indies	2	33	84	6	2.54	Gordon Greenidge; Desmond Haynes; Richie Richardson; Vivian Richards; Gus Logie; Malcolm Marshall	Lost
22	26 December 1991	Melbourne Cricket Ground, Melbourne	Australia	2	35	97	5	2.77	Geoff Marsh; David Boon; Allan Border; Ian Healy; Merv Hughes	Lost
23	25 January 1992	Adelaide Oval, Adelaide	Australia	3	51	130	5	2.54	Mark Taylor; Geoff Marsh; Dean Jones; Mark Waugh; Ian Healy	Lost

== ODIs ==
Five-wicket hauls in One Day Internationals
No.	Date	Ground	Against	Inn	Overs	Runs	Wkts	Econ	Batsmen	Result
1	13 June 1983	Trent Bridge, Nottingham	Australia	1	12	43	5	3.58	Kepler Wessels; Rod Marsh; Ken MacLeay; Tom Hogan; Geoff Lawson	Lost
