= List of cricketers with five-wicket hauls in all international formats =

In cricket, a five-wicket haul (also known as a "five–for" or "fifer") occurs when a bowler takes five or more wickets in a single innings. This is regarded by critics as a notable achievement, equivalent to a century from a batsman.

Pakistan's Umar Gul became the first bowler to achieve this feat after he took his first five-wicket haul in T20I in June 2009 since he took his first five-wicket haul in ODI in September 2003 and in Test in April 2004.

In 2018, India's Kuldeep Yadav became the only player who has taken a five-wicket haul in all three formats in the same year, receiving his T20I and ODI five-wicket haul in July against England and in October he took the five-wicket haul in Test against West Indies.

== Men's international cricket ==
As of February 2026, 14 male players have taken five-wicket hauls in all three international formats.

A player name in bold text indicates that the player is still an active international cricketer.

Sl.	Bowler	Tests		ODIs		T20Is		Total	Refs
Sl.	Bowler	First 5W-haul	5WI	First 5W-haul	5WI	First 5W-haul	5WI	5WI	Refs
1	(Pakistan) Umar Gul	5/31 v India (5 Apr 2004)	4	5/17 v Bangladesh (13 Sep 2003)	2	5/6 v New Zealand (13 Jun 2009)	2	8	
2	(New Zealand) Tim Southee	5/55 v England (22 Mar 2008)	15	5/33 v Pakistan (22 Jan 2011)	3	5/18 v Pakistan (26 Dec 2010)	2	20	
3	(Sri Lanka) Lasith Malinga	5/80 v New Zealand (4 Apr 2005)	3	5/34 v Pakistan (15 Jun 2010)	8	5/31 v England (1 Oct 2012)	2	13	
4	(Sri Lanka) Ajantha Mendis	6/99 v Bangladesh (4 Feb 2014)	4	6/13 v India (6 Jul 2008)	3	6/8 v Zimbabwe (18 Sep 2012)	2	9	
5	(South Africa) Imran Tahir	5/32 v Pakistan (23 Oct 2013)	2	5/45 v West Indies (27 Feb 2015)	3	5/24 v New Zealand (17 Feb 2017)	2	7	
6	(India) Bhuvneshwar Kumar	5/82 v England (9 Jul 2014)	4	5/42 Sri Lanka (3 Sep 2017)	1	5/24 v South Africa (18 Feb 2018)	2	7	
7	(India) **Kuldeep Yadav**	5/57 v West Indies (4 Oct 2018)	5	6/25 v England (12 Jul 2018)	2	5/24 v England (3 Jul 2018)	2	9	
8	(Bangladesh) Shakib Al Hasan	7/36 v New Zealand (17 Oct 2008)	19	5/47 v Zimbabwe (7 Nov 2015)	4	5/20 v West Indies (20 Dec 2018)	2	25	
9	(Afghanistan) **Rashid Khan**	5/82 v Ireland (15 Mar 2019)	5	6/43 v Ireland (17 Mar 2017)	7	5/3 v Ireland (10 Mar 2017)	2	14	
10	(Cricket West Indies) **Jason Holder**	5/30 v Pakistan (30 Oct 2016)	8	5/27 v India (2 Jul 2017)	2	5/27 v England (30 Jan 2022)	1	11	
11	(South Africa) **Lungi Ngidi**	6/39 v India (13 Jan 2018)	3	6/58 v Australia (4 Mar 2020)	2	5/39 v England (27 Jul 2022)	1	6	
12	(Cricket West Indies) **Alzarri Joseph**	5/81 v South Africa (28 Feb 2023)	2	5/56 v England (27 Sep 2017)	1	5/40 v South Africa (28 Mar 2023)	1	4	
13	(Pakistan) **Hasan Ali**	5/45 v New Zealand (16 Nov 2018)	6	5/52 v Australia (22 Jan 2017)	4	5/30 v Bangladesh (28 May 2025)	1	11	
14	(Sri Lanka) **Dushmantha Chameera**	5/47 v New Zealand (18 Dec 2015)	1	5/16 v Bangladesh (28 May 2021)	1	5/24 v England (3 Feb 2026)	1	3	

== Women's international cricket ==
As of April 2026, only four women have achieved a five-wicket-haul in all three international formats.

A player name in bold text indicates that the player is still an active international cricketer.

Sl.	Bowler	Tests		ODIs		T20Is		Refs
Sl.	Bowler	First 5W-haul	5WI	First 5W-haul	5WI	First 5W-haul	5WI	Refs
1	(India) Jhulan Goswami	5/25 v England (22 Nov 2005)	3	5/16 v England (7 Dec 2005)	2	5/11 v Australia (23 Mar 2012)	1	
2	(England) Jenny Gunn	5/19 v India (14 Aug 2014)	1	5/31 v New Zealand (15 July 2010)	2	5/18 v New Zealand (22 Oct 2013)	1	
3	(Australia) **Ashleigh Gardner**	8/66 v England (22 Jun 2023)	1	5/30 v India (11 Dec 2024)	1	5/12 v New Zealand (11 Feb 2023)	1	
4	(India) **Deepti Sharma**	5/7 v England (14 Dec 2023)	1	6/20 v Sri Lanka (19 Feb 2016)	4	5/19 v South Africa (25 Apr 2026)	2	
Women's Test, ODI and T20I hauls.
