= List of international cricket five-wicket hauls by Ian Botham =

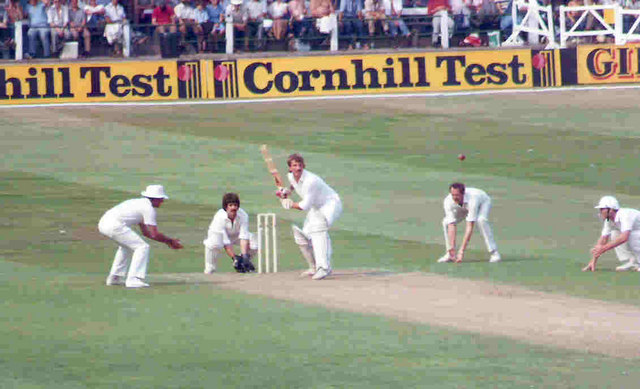
Botham batting for England at Trent Bridge in 1983

Sir Ian Botham is a former international cricketer and captain of the England cricket team. He has claimed five-wicket hauls (taken five or more wickets in an innings) in Test cricket on 27 occasions, second only to James Anderson among English cricketers. A five-wicket haul is regarded as a notable achievement, and as of October 2024, only 54 bowlers have taken 15 or more five-wicket hauls at international level in their cricketing careers. Botham is generally considered one of the greatest all-rounders of all time. He was named as a Wisden Cricketer of the Year in 1978, and Indian Cricket Cricketer of the Year four years later. In 1992 he was awarded an Order of the British Empire (OBE), and he was knighted for his services to cricket and charity work in 2007. Two years later, he was honoured by the International Cricket Council, who named him as one of 55 initial inductees into the ICC Cricket Hall of Fame. He is ninth overall in all-time Test five-wicket haul takers. (Note: Records correct as of 18 March 2024.)

He made his international debut for England on 26 August 1976 in a One Day International (ODI) against the West Indies. He made his Test cricket debut just under a year later against Australia, and it was during the first innings of this match that he claimed his first international five-wicket haul. It is against Australia that he has claimed the most five-wicket hauls, doing so on nine occasions. Three of these came during the 1981 Ashes series and, along with the two centuries he scored, saw the series dubbed "Botham's Ashes". He twice claimed eight wickets in an innings, playing at Lord's on each occasion, against Pakistan in 1978 and the West Indies in 1984. Including these performances, Botham has collected a five-wicket haul at Lord's eight times, more so than on any other ground.

Botham never managed to take five-wickets in an innings in ODI cricket, despite playing 116 matches and claiming 145 wickets, making him England's seventh highest wicket-taker in the format. His best return was four wickets, which he achieved on three occasions.

== Key ==
- Date – Starting date of the match.
- Inn. – The innings of the match in which the five wicket haul was taken.
- Overs – Number of overs bowled in that innings.
- Runs – Runs conceded.
- Wkts – Number of wickets taken.
- Econ. – Bowling economy rate (average runs per over).
- Batsmen – The batsmen whose wickets were taken in the five wicket haul.
- Result – The result for the England team in that match.
- † – Botham was selected player of the match.
- * – Botham claimed 10 wickets or more in the match.
- ‡ – Botham also scored a century in this match.

== Tests ==
No.	Date	Ground	Against	Inn.	Overs	Runs	Wkts	Econ.	Batsmen	Result
1	28 July 1977	Trent Bridge, Nottingham	Australia	1	20.0	74	5	3.70	GS Chappell; KD Walters; RW Marsh; MHN Walker; JR Thomson	Won
2	11 August 1977	Headingley, Leeds	Australia	2	11.0	21	5	1.90	DW Hookes; KD Walters; RW Marsh; MHN Walker; JR Thomson	Won
3	24 February 1978 ‡	Lancaster Park, Christchurch	New Zealand	2	24.7 (Note: Eight-ball overs were bowled in this match.)	73	5	2.20	BE Congdon; MG Burgess; WK Lees; RO Collinge; EJ Chatfield	Won
4	4 March 1978	Eden Park, Auckland	New Zealand	1	34.0	109	5	2.40	RW Anderson; MG Burgess; BE Congdon; JM Parker; RJ Hadlee	Drawn
5	15 June 1978 ‡†	Lord's, London	Pakistan	3	20.5	34	8	1.63	Mudassar Nazar; Talat Ali; Haroon Rasheed; Wasim Raja; Wasim Bari; Sikander Bakht; Iqbal Qasim; Javed Miandad	Won
6	10 August 1978 †	Trent Bridge, Nottingham	New Zealand	2	21.0	34	6	1.61	BA Edgar; RW Anderson; MG Burgess; BE Congdon; GN Edwards; RJ Hadlee	Won
7	24 August 1978 *	Lord's, London	New Zealand	1	38.0	101	6	2.65	JG Wright; MG Burgess; BE Congdon; RW Anderson; RJ Hadlee; GP Howarth	Won
8	24 August 1978 *	Lord's, London	New Zealand	3	18.1	39	5	2.14	BA Edgar; JM Parker; JG Wright; MG Burgess; RO Collinge	Won
9	12 July 1979	Edgbaston, Birmingham	India	3	29.0	70	5	2.41	GR Viswanath; AD Gaekwad; M Amarnath; N Kapil Dev; S Venkataraghavan	Won
10	2 August 1979	Lord's, London	India	1	19.0	35	5	1.84	CPS Chauhan; AD Gaekwad; Yashpal Sharma; N Kapil Dev; B Reddy	Drawn
11	14 December 1979 *†	WACA, Perth	Australia	1	35.0	78	6	2.22	BM Laird; AR Border; GS Chappell; RJ Bright; DK Lillee; G Dymock	Lost
12	14 December 1979 *†	WACA, Perth	Australia	3	45.5	98	5	2.13	KJ Hughes; PM Toohey; RW Marsh; RJ Bright; JR Thomson	Lost
13	15 February 1980 *‡	Wankhede Stadium, Bombay	India	1	22.5	58	6	2.54	SM Gavaskar; SM Patil; Yashpal Sharma; N Kapil Dev; NS Yadav; DR Doshi	Won
14	15 February 1980 *‡	Wankhede Stadium, Bombay	India	3	26.0	48	7	1.84	SM Gavaskar; RMH Binny; GR Viswanath; SM Patil; Yashpal Sharma; SMH Kirmani; NS Yadav	Won
15	16 July 1981 ‡†	Headingley, Leeds	Australia	1	39.2	95	6	2.41	GM Wood; KJ Hughes; GN Yallop; AR Border; RW Marsh; GF Lawson	Won
16	30 July 1981 †	Edgbaston, Birmingham	Australia	4	14.0	11	5	0.78	MF Kent; RW Marsh; RJ Bright; DK Lillee; TM Alderman	Won
17	27 August 1981 *†	The Oval, London	Australia	1	47.0	125	6	2.65	GM Wood; MF Kent; KJ Hughes; RJ Bright; TM Alderman; MR Whitney	Drawn
18	27 November 1981	Wankhede Stadium, Bombay	India	3	22.3	61	5	2.71	SM Gavaskar; DB Vengsarkar; GR Viswanath; SM Patil; DR Doshi	Lost
19	10 June 1982	Lord's, London	India	2	19.4	46	5	2.33	SM Gavaskar; GAHM Parkar; GR Viswanath; S Madan Lal; DR Doshi	Won
20	26 August 1982	Headingley, Leeds	Pakistan	3	30.0	74	5	2.46	Mansoor Akhtar; Javed Miandad; Zaheer Abbas; Majid Khan; Imran Khan	Won
21	30 January 1984 ‡†	Basin Reserve, Wellington	New Zealand	1	27.4	59	5	2.13	JG Wright; BA Edgar; GP Howarth; RJ Hadlee; IDS Smith	Drawn
22	28 June 1984 †	Lord's, London	West Indies	2	27.4	103	8	3.72	CG Greenidge; DL Haynes; HA Gomes; IVA Richards; CH Lloyd; PJL Dujon; RA Harper; J Garner	Lost
23	9 August 1984	The Oval, London	West Indies	1	23.0	72	5	3.13	CG Greenidge; IVA Richards; PJL Dujon; RA Harper; MA Holding	Lost
24	23 August 1984	Lord's, London	Sri Lanka	3	27.0	90	6	3.33	S Wettimuny; RS Madugalle; RL Dias; A Ranatunga; LRD Mendis; ALF de Mel	Drawn
25	27 June 1985	Lord's, London	Australia	2	24.0	109	5	4.54	KC Wessels; AR Border; DC Boon; GM Ritchie; WB Phillips	Lost
26	3 April 1986	Queen's Park Oval, Port of Spain	West Indies	2	24.1	71	5	2.93	IVA Richards; PJL Dujon; RA Harper; MA Holding; BP Patterson	Lost
27	26 December 1986	Melbourne Cricket Ground, Melbourne	Australia	1	16.0	41	5	2.56	GR Marsh; AR Border; TJ Zoehrer; CJ McDermott; MG Hughes	Won
