= List of international cricket five-wicket hauls by Brett Lee =

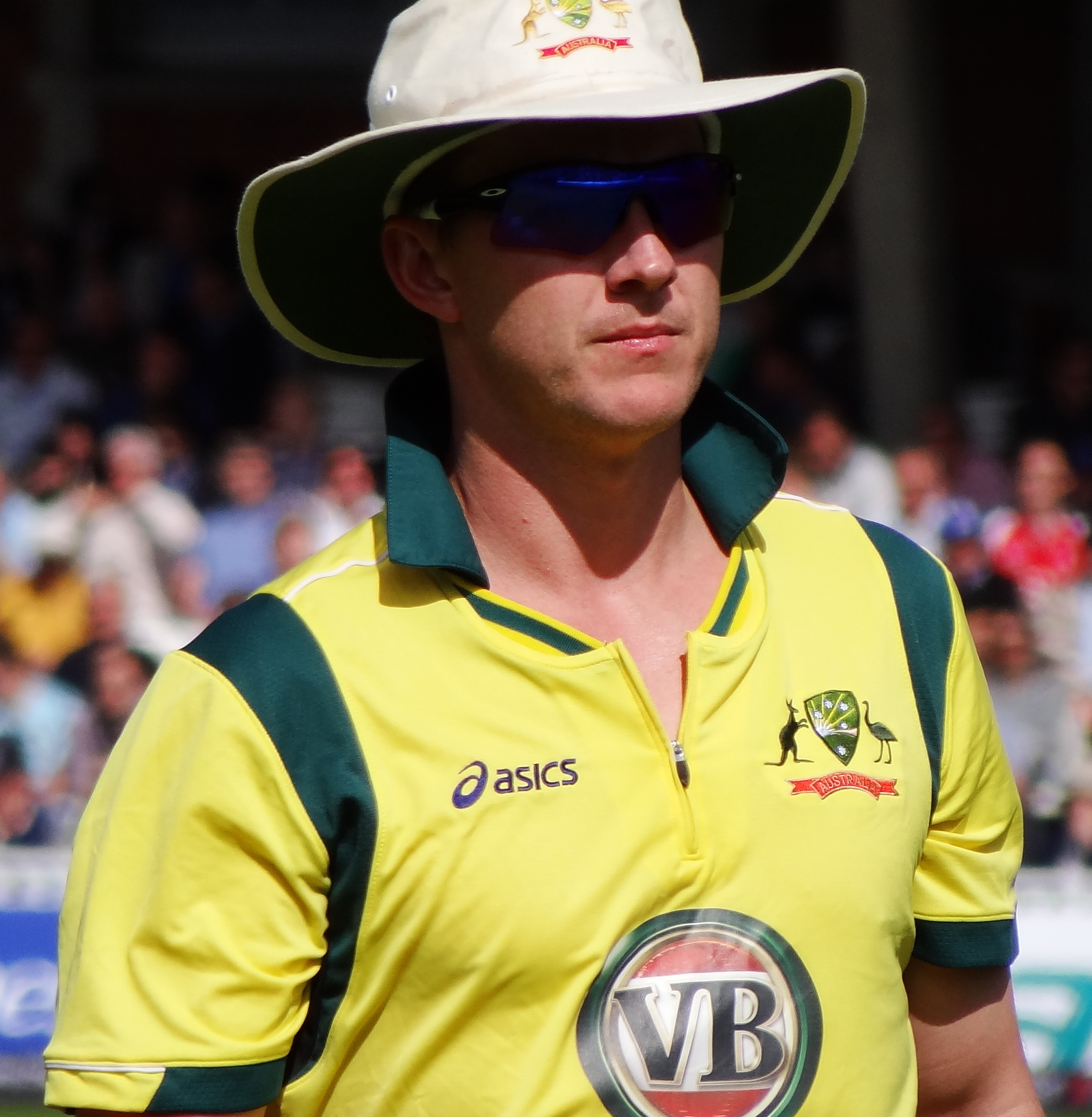
Brett Lee has the third-highest number of fifers in ODIs.

In cricket, a five-wicket haul (also known as a "five-for" or "fifer") refers to a bowler taking five or more wickets in a single innings. This is regarded as a notable achievement, and as of October 2024, only 54 bowlers have taken 15 or more five-wicket hauls at international level in their cricketing careers. Brett Lee has the seventh-highest number of international five-wicket hauls among Australian cricketers as of 2024. (Note: The five-wicket haul is defined by the accumulative sum of all formats of the game.) A right-arm fast bowler, he is regarded as one of the fastest international bowlers in the modern cricketing era.

Lee picked up a five-wicket haul on Test debut, playing against India in December 1999; a match that Australia won. His career-best figures for an innings were 5 wickets for 30 runs against West Indies at the Brisbane Cricket Ground in November 2005; while never managing to take ten wickets in a single match. Eight of his ten Test five-wicket hauls were taken at home. After capturing 310 wickets, Lee retired from Test cricket in 2010 and remains Australia's fourth-most successful bowler in the format.

After making his One Day International (ODI) debut against Pakistan in January 2000, Lee's first ODI five-wicket haul came in one of the matches of the series against India; the performance ensured Australia's victory. With nine five-wicket hauls, his position is third in the all-time ODI list. His career-best bowling in ODI cricket was 5 wickets for 22 runs against South Africa at Melbourne Cricket Ground in January 2006; his performance earned him the man of the match award. Lee claimed 19 five-wicket hauls in his International career, and Australia never lost any of the games on such instances. However, he never took more than five wickets in a single innings in any format of the international game. Lee played his first Twenty20 International (T20I) against New Zealand in 2005, and is Australia's fourth-highest wicket-taker in the format. He never took a five-wicket haul in T20I, where his best bowling figures remain 3 wickets for 23 runs. Lee announced his retirement from international cricket in July 2012.

== Key ==
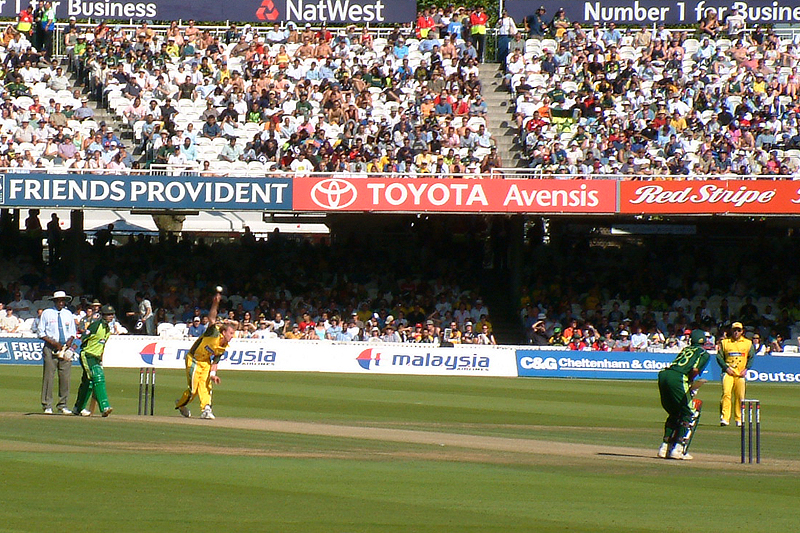
Lee bowling in a warm-up match against Pakistan during the 2004 ICC Champions Trophy.

Symbol	Meaning
Date	Day the Test started or ODI held
Inn	Innings in which five-wicket haul was taken
Overs	Number of overs bowled
Runs	Number of runs conceded
Wkts	Number of wickets taken
Econ	Runs conceded per over
Batsmen	Batsmen whose wickets were taken
Result	Result for the Australia team
‡	Lee was selected as man of the match

== Tests ==
List of five-wicket hauls by Brett Lee in Test cricket
No.	Date	Ground	Against	Inn	Overs	Runs	Wkts	Econ	Batsmen	Result
1	26 December 1999	Melbourne Cricket Ground, Melbourne	India	2	18	47	5	2.61	Sadagoppan Ramesh; Rahul Dravid; Mannava Prasad; Ajit Agarkar; Javagal Srinath	Won
2	31 March 2000	Westpac Trust Park, Hamilton	New Zealand	1	23	77	5	3.34	Mathew Sinclair; Stephen Fleming; Nathan Astle; Craig McMillan; Chris Cairns	Won
3	1 December 2000	WACA Ground, Perth	West Indies	3	15	61	5	4.06	Sherwin Campbell; Ramnaresh Sarwan; Nixon McLean; Marlon Black; Courtney Walsh	Won
4	8 November 2001 ‡	Brisbane Cricket Ground, Brisbane	New Zealand	2	23	61	5	2.91	Mathew Sinclair; Nathan Astle; Craig McMillan; Chris Cairns; Adam Parore	Won
5	3 November 2005	Brisbane Cricket Ground, Brisbane	West Indies	4	14	30	5	2.14	Devon Smith; Ramnaresh Sarwan; Denesh Ramdin; Corey Collymore; Jermaine Lawson	Won
6	16 December 2005	WACA Ground, Perth	South Africa	2	22.2	93	5	4.16	Herschelle Gibbs; Jacques Rudolph; Shaun Pollock; Charl Langeveldt; Makhaya Ntini	Drawn
7	24 March 2006	Kingsmead Cricket Ground, Durban	South Africa	2	19.4	69	5	3.50	Graeme Smith; Mark Boucher; Shaun Pollock; André Nel; Makhaya Ntini	Won
8	2 January 2008	Sydney Cricket Ground, Sydney	India	2	32.2	119	5	3.68	Wasim Jaffer; Yuvraj Singh; Mahendra Singh Dhoni; Anil Kumble; Ishant Sharma	Won
9	30 May 2008	Sir Vivian Richards Stadium, Antigua	West Indies	2	21	59	5	2.80	Dwayne Bravo; Denesh Ramdin; Darren Sammy; Jerome Taylor; Darren Powell	Drawn
10	28 November 2008	Adelaide Oval, Adelaide	New Zealand	3	25	105	5	4.20	Aaron Redmond; Jamie How; Jesse Ryder; Ross Taylor; Iain O'Brien	Won

== ODIs ==
List of five-wicket hauls by Brett Lee in One Day Internationals
No.	Date	Ground	Against	Inn	Overs	Runs	Wkts	Econ	Batsmen	Result
1	26 January 2000	Melbourne Cricket Ground, Melbourne	India	2	8.5	27	5	3.05	Sachin Tendulkar; Hrishikesh Kanitkar; Anil Kumble; Javagal Srinath; Debashish Mohanty	Won
2	25 January 2003 ‡	Melbourne Cricket Ground, Melbourne	England	2	9.3	30	5	3.15	Marcus Trescothick; Nick Knight; Andrew Flintoff; Ian Blackwell; Andy Caddick	Won
3	11 March 2003	St George's Oval, Port Elizabeth	New Zealand	2	9.1	42	5	4.58	Stephen Fleming; Brendon McCullum; Jacob Oram; Andre Adams; Shane Bond	Won
4	10 July 2005 ‡	Lord's Cricket Ground, London	England	1	10	41	5	4.10	Kevin Pietersen; Andrew Flintoff; Paul Collingwood; Geraint Jones; Ashley Giles	Won
5	20 January 2006 ‡	Docklands Stadium, Melbourne	South Africa	2	10	22	5	2.20	Graeme Smith; Boeta Dippenaar; Andrew Hall; Ashwell Prince; Justin Kemp	Won
6	22 September 2006 ‡	Kinrara Academy Oval, Kuala Lumpur	India	2	8.5	38	5	4.30	Virender Sehwag; Sachin Tendulkar; Mahendra Singh Dhoni; RP Singh; Munaf Patel	Won
7	3 February 2008	Brisbane Cricket Ground, Brisbane	India	1	9	27	5	3.00	Sachin Tendulkar; Rohit Sharma; Manoj Tiwary; Mahendra Singh Dhoni; Harbhajan Singh	N/R (Note: Match was abandoned due to rain.)
8	24 February 2008	Sydney Cricket Ground, Sydney	India	2	9.1	58	5	6.32	Sachin Tendulkar; Mahendra Singh Dhoni; Robin Uthappa; Harbhajan Singh; Ishant Sharma	Won
9	12 September 2009 ‡	Lord's Cricket Ground, London	England	1	9	49	5	5.44	Joe Denly; Matt Prior; Luke Wright; Stuart Broad; Adil Rashid	Won
