= List of international cricket five-wicket hauls by Dennis Lillee =

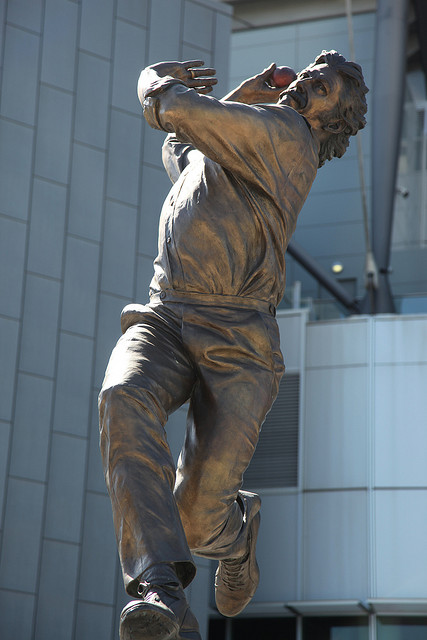
Bronze statue of Dennis Lillee, one of the Parade of Champions, located outside the Melbourne Cricket Ground

Dennis Lillee is a former Australian cricketer who took 24 five-wicket hauls during his career in international cricket. A five-wicket haul (also known as a "five–for" or "fifer") refers to a bowler taking five or more wickets in a single innings. This is regarded as a notable achievement, and as of October 2024, only 54 bowlers have taken 15 or more five-wicket hauls at international level in their cricketing careers. (Note: The five-wicket haul is defined by the accumulative sum of all formats of the game.) A fast bowler who represented the Australian cricket team between 1971 and 1984, Lillee was described by one writer as "the heart of Australia['s] bowling attack for more than a decade" and was rated "the outstanding fast bowler of his generation" by the BBC. He was the first bowler to capture 350 Test wickets and held the record for almost two years before Ian Botham surpassed the feat. Lillee was named one of the Wisden Cricketers of the Year in 1973 and the South African Cricket (Annual) Cricketer of the Year three years later. The International Cricket Council (ICC) inducted him into its Cricket Hall of Fame in 2009.

Lillee made his Test debut during the sixth Test of the 1970–71 Ashes series where he claimed a five-wicket haul on debut. He was subsequently selected for the 1972 tour of England and took a pair of five-wicket hauls for the first time in a single match during the final Test of the same series. He ended the series with 31 wickets at an average of 17.67. He went on to claim five-wicket hauls in both innings of a Test match on three more occasions. Lillee's career-best figures for an innings were 7 wickets for 83 runs against the West Indies in 1981. He was most successful against England with eleven five-wicket hauls against them, and was most effective at the Melbourne Cricket Ground, where he took seven of his twenty three five-wicket hauls. When Lillee retired from Test cricket in 1984, he had taken ten or more wickets in a match on seven occasions.

Lillee's One Day International (ODI) debut came against England in 1972. His sole five-wicket haul in ODIs came against Pakistan during the Prudential World Cup (1975) at Headingley. As of 2012, Lillee's combined tally of 24 five-wicket hauls is eleventh in the all-time list, a record jointly held with Sydney Barnes, Imran Khan, Kapil Dev and Dale Steyn.

This list includes only matches that are deemed official by the ICC. Lillee's performances in World Series Cricket and the World XI tour of Australia in 1971–72 are not included.

== Key ==
Symbol	Meaning
Date	Day the Test started or ODI held
Inn	Innings of the match in which the five-wicket haul was taken
Overs	Number of overs bowled in that innings
Runs	Runs conceded
Wkts	Number of wickets taken
Econ	Bowling economy rate (average runs per over)
Batsmen	Batsmen who were dismissed by Lillee in the five-wicket haul
Result	Result for the Australian team in that match
†	Lillee was Man of the match
‡	10 wickets or more taken in the match
§	One of two five-wicket hauls by Lillee in a match

== Tests ==
Five-wicket hauls in Test cricket
No.	Date	Ground	Against	Inn	Overs	Runs	Wkts	Econ	Batsmen	Result
1	29 January 1971	Adelaide Oval, Adelaide	England	1	28.3 (Note: Eight-ball overs were bowled in this match.)	84	5	2.22	John Edrich; Alan Knott; Ray Illingworth; John Snow; Bob Willis	Drawn
2	8 June 1972	Old Trafford Cricket Ground, Manchester	England	3	30	66	6	2.20	Mike Smith; Basil D'Oliveira; Alan Knott; Ray Illingworth; John Snow; Norman Gifford	Lost
3	10 August 1972 ‡ §	Kennington Oval, London	England	1	24.2	58	5	2.38	John Edrich; Peter Parfitt; Ray Illingworth; Alan Knott; John Snow	Won
4	10 August 1972 § ‡	Kennington Oval, London	England	3	32.2	123	5	3.80	John Edrich; Peter Parfitt; Tony Greig; Ray Illingworth; Alan Knott	Won
5	10 August 1975	Edgbaston Cricket Ground, Birmingham	England	2	15	15	5	1.00	John Edrich; Dennis Amiss; Alan Knott; Derek Underwood; John Snow	Won
6	31 January 1976	Melbourne Cricket Ground, Melbourne	West Indies	2	11.3	63	5	4.15	Viv Richards; Clive Lloyd; Deryck Murray; Michael Holding; Lance Gibbs	Won
7	24 December 1976	Adelaide Oval, Adelaide	Pakistan	4	47.7	163	5	2.55	Majid Khan; Zaheer Abbas; Mushtaq Mohammad; Saleem Altaf; Wasim Bari	Drawn
8	1 January 1977 ‡	Melbourne Cricket Ground, Melbourne	Pakistan	2	23	82	6	2.67	Majid Khan; Mushtaq Mohammad; Javed Miandad; Imran Khan; Saleem Altaf; Wasim Bari	Won
9	25 February 1977 ‡ §	Eden Park, Auckland	New Zealand	1	17.3	51	5	2.20	Geoff Howarth; Bev Congdon; John Parker; Richard Hadlee; Peter Petherick	Won
10	25 February 1977 ‡ §	Eden Park, Auckland	New Zealand	3	15.7	72	6	3.40	Glenn Turner; Geoff Howarth; Bev Congdon; Jock Edwards; Hedley Howarth; Peter Petherick	Won
11	12 March 1977 ‡ §	Melbourne Cricket Ground, Melbourne	England	2	13.3	26	6	1.45	Bob Woolmer; Mike Brearley; Derek Randall; Alan Knott; Chris Old; John Lever	Won
12	12 March 1977 ‡ §	Melbourne Cricket Ground, Melbourne	England	4	34.4	139	5	3.02	Mike Brearley; Keith Fletcher; Alan Knott; Chris Old; Derek Underwood	Won
13	26 January 1980	Adelaide Oval, Adelaide	West Indies	1	25	78	5	3.25	Gordon Greenidge; Viv Richards; Clive Lloyd; Andy Roberts; Joel Garner	Lost
14	1 February 1980 † ‡ §	Melbourne Cricket Ground, Melbourne	England	1	33.1	60	6	1.80	David Gower; Ian Botham; Bob Taylor; Derek Underwood; John Lever; Bob Willis	Won
15	1 February 1980 † §	Melbourne Cricket Ground, Melbourne	England	3	33	78	5	2.36	Geoffrey Boycott; David Gower; Peter Willey; Bob Taylor; John Lever	Won
16	28 November 1980	Brisbane Cricket Ground, Brisbane	New Zealand	3	15	53	6	3.53	John Wright; Bruce Edgar; Paul McEwan; Geoff Howarth; Mark Burgess; Lance Cairns	Won
17	12 December 1980	WACA Ground, Perth	New Zealand	1	23.5	63	5	2.64	Bruce Edgar; Paul McEwan; Mark Burgess; John Bracewell; Lance Cairns	Won
18	18 June 1981 †	Trent Bridge, Nottingham	England	3	16.4	46	5	2.76	Graham Gooch; David Gower; Peter Willey; Ian Botham; Bob Willis	Won
19	27 August 1981 ‡	Kennington Oval, London	England	2	31.4	89	7	2.81	Geoffrey Boycott; Wayne Larkins; Chris Tavaré; Mike Gatting; Ian Botham; Alan Knott; John Emburey	Drawn
20	13 November 1981	WACA Ground, Perth	Pakistan	2	9	18	5	2.00	Mudassar Nazar; Majid Khan; Wasim Raja; Imran Khan; Wasim Bari	Won
21	27 November 1981 †	Brisbane Cricket Ground, Brisbane	Pakistan	1	20	81	5	4.05	Mudassar Nazar; Majid Khan; Javed Miandad; Zaheer Abbas; Wasim Raja	Won
22	26 December 1981 ‡	Melbourne Cricket Ground, Melbourne	West Indies	2	26.3	83	7	3.13	Desmond Haynes; Colin Croft; Viv Richards; Larry Gomes; Jeff Dujon; Andy Roberts; Joel Garner	Won
23	9 December 1983	Adelaide Oval, Adelaide	Pakistan	2	50.2	171	6	3.39	Mudassar Nazar; Qasim Umar; Sarfraz Nawaz; Abdul Qadir; Wasim Bari; Azeem Hafeez	Drawn

== One Day Internationals ==
Five-wicket hauls in One Day Internationals
No.	Date	Ground	Against	Inn	Overs	Runs	Wkts	Econ	Batsmen	Result
1	7 June 1975 †	Headingley, Leeds	Pakistan	2	12	34	5	2.83	Sadiq Mohammad; Asif Iqbal; Sarfraz Nawaz; Wasim Bari; Asif Masood	Won
