= List of international cricket five-wicket hauls by Mitchell Johnson =

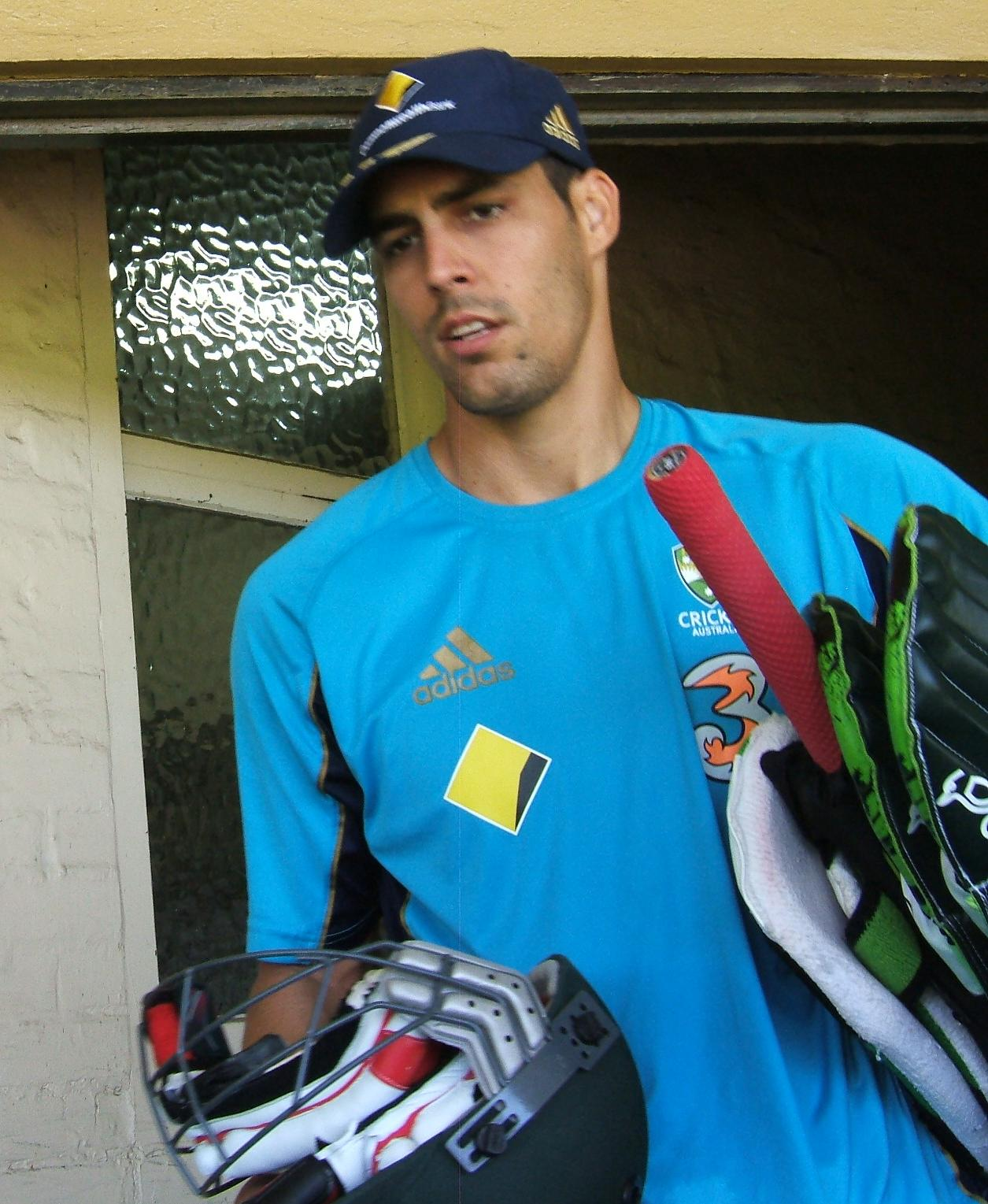
Mitchell Johnson has taken fifteen five-wicket hauls in international cricket.

In cricket, a five-wicket haul (also known as a "fifer") refers to a bowler taking five or more wickets in a single innings. This is regarded as a notable achievement, and as of October 2024, only 54 bowlers have taken 15 or more five-wicket hauls at international level in their cricketing careers. Mitchell Johnson—a left-arm fast bowler—is a former Test, One Day International (ODI) and Twenty20 International (T20I) cricketer who represented Australia. Johnson took 264 wickets in Test matches, 212 wickets in ODIs and 38 wickets in T20Is. With 15 five-wicket hauls across all formats of the game, he ranks equal thirty-ninth among all-time combined five-wicket haul takers, and ninth in the equivalent list for Australia. (Note: Johnson is ranked equal thirty-ninth with Alec Bedser, Craig McDermott and Danish Kaneria.)

Johnson made his Test debut against Sri Lanka in 2007. His first five-wicket haul came against New Zealand during the first Test of the 2008–09 series at the Gabba. His 5 wickets for 39 runs in the second innings raised his tally to 9 wickets for the match. Australia won the match by 149 runs and his performance earned him the man-of-the-match award. His best bowling figures for an innings are 8 wickets for 61 runs against South Africa in 2008. In Test matches, Johnson was most successful against England, taking 5 of his 12 five-wicket hauls against them.

In 2005, Johnson made his ODI debut against New Zealand. He took his first five-wicket haul against India in 2007. Johnson took 5 wickets for 26 runs in the match, which Australian won by 9 wickets. His career best figures are 6 wickets for 31 runs against Sri Lanka at Pallekele International Cricket Stadium in 2011. Although Johnson made his first T20I appearance in 2007, he did not pick up a fifer in the format. Figures of 3 wickets for 15 runs against Sri Lanka in 2010 were his best in this version of the game.

== Tests ==
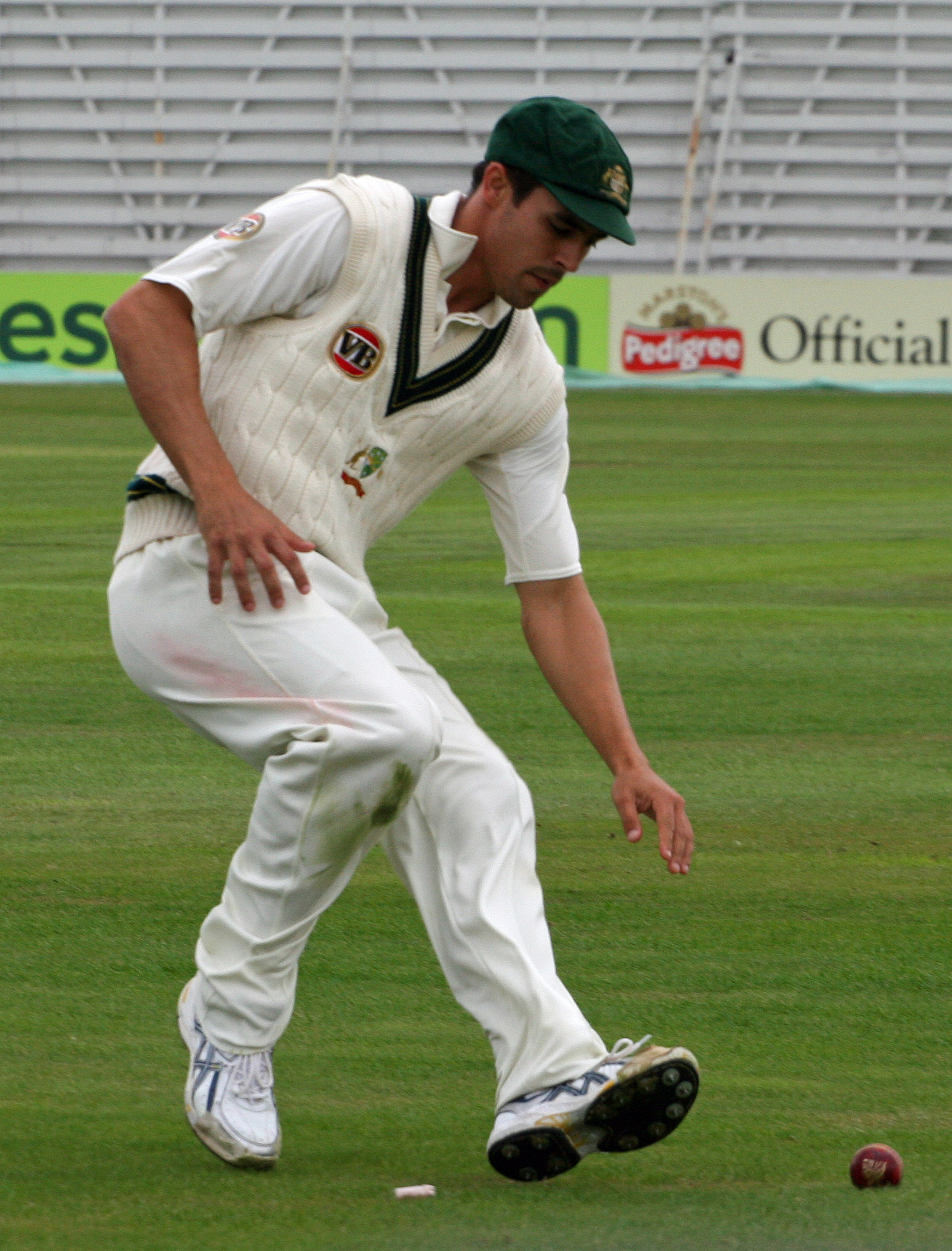
Johnson fielding during a tour match against Northamptonshire during the 2009 Ashes series.

Key
Symbol	Meaning
Date	Day the Test started or ODI held
Inn	Innings in which five-wicket haul was taken
Overs	Number of overs bowled
Runs	Number of runs conceded
Wkts	Number of wickets taken
Econ	Runs conceded per over
Batsmen	Batsmen whose wickets were taken
Result	Result for the Australia team
*	One of two five wicket hauls by Johnson in a match
†	10 or more wickets taken in the match
‡	Johnson was selected as the man of the match

Five-wicket hauls in Test cricket by Mitchell Johnson
No.	Date	Ground	Against	Inn	Overs	Runs	Wkts	Econ	Batsmen	Result
1	20 November 2008 ‡	The Gabba, Brisbane	New Zealand	4	17.3	39	5	2.22	Jesse Ryder; Daniel Flynn; Daniel Vettori; Ross Taylor; Chris Martin	Won
2	17 December 2008 † ‡	WACA Ground, Perth	South Africa	2	24	61	8	2.54	Neil McKenzie; Graeme Smith; AB de Villiers; Jacques Kallis; JP Duminy; Morné Morkel; Paul Harris; Dale Steyn	Lost
3	7 August 2009	Headingley, Leeds	England	3	19.3	69	5	3.53	Ian Bell; Paul Collingwood; Alastair Cook; Graeme Swann; Graham Onions	Won
4	4 December 2009	Adelaide Oval, Adelaide	West Indies	3	22	103	5	4.68	Ramnaresh Sarwan; Dwayne Bravo; Denesh Ramdin; Sulieman Benn; Ravi Rampaul	Drawn
5	27 March 2010 † ‡	Seddon Park, Hamilton	New Zealand	4	20.1	73	6	3.61	Tim McIntosh; BJ Watling; Ross Taylor; Martin Guptill; Brent Arnel; Tim Southee	Won
6	1 October 2010	Punjab Cricket Association Stadium, Mohali	India	2	20	64	5	3.20	Gautam Gambhir; Virender Sehwag; Mahendra Singh Dhoni; Harbhajan Singh; Suresh Raina	Lost
7	16 December 2010 ‡	WACA Ground, Perth	England	2	17.3	38	6	2.17	Alastair Cook; Jonathan Trott; Kevin Pietersen; Paul Collingwood; Chris Tremlett; James Anderson	Won
8	21 November 2013 ‡	The Gabba, Brisbane	England	4	21.1	42	5	1.98	Jonathan Trott; Kevin Pietersen; Stuart Broad; Graeme Swann; James Anderson	Won
9	5 December 2013 † ‡	Adelaide Oval, Adelaide	England	2	17.2	40	7	2.30	Alastair Cook; Ben Stokes; Matt Prior; Stuart Broad; Graeme Swann; James Anderson; Monty Panesar	Won
10	26 December 2013	Melbourne Cricket Ground, Melbourne	England	1	24	63	5	2.62	Ben Stokes; Jonny Bairstow; Tim Bresnan; Kevin Pietersen; Stuart Broad	Won
11	12 February 2014 * † ‡	SuperSport Park, Centurion	South Africa	2	17.1	68	7	3.96	Graeme Smith; Alviro Petersen; Faf du Plessis; Ryan McLaren; Robin Peterson; AB de Villiers; Morné Morkel	Won
12	12 February 2014 * † ‡	SuperSport Park, Centurion	South Africa	4	16	59	5	3.68	Alviro Petersen; Graeme Smith; JP Duminy; Ryan McLaren; AB de Villiers	Won

== One Day Internationals ==
Five-wicket hauls in ODI cricket by Mitchell Johnson
No.	Date	Ground	Against	Inn	Overs	Runs	Wkts	Econ	Batsmen	Result
1	11 October 2007 ‡	IPCL Sports Complex Ground, Vadodara	India	1	10	26	5	2.60	Yuvraj Singh; Robin Uthappa; Mahendra Singh Dhoni; Irfan Pathan; Murali Kartik	Won
2	6 July 2008	Warner Park Sporting Complex, Basseterre	West Indies	2	7.5	29	5	3.70	Chris Gayle; Ramnaresh Sarwan; Darren Powell; Nikita Miller; Fidel Edwards	Won
3	10 August 2011 ‡	Pallekele International Cricket Stadium, Kandy	Sri Lanka	1	10	31	6	3.10	Mahela Jayawardene; Kumar Sangakkara; Jeevan Mendis; Angelo Mathews; Suraj Randiv; Ajantha Mendis	Won
