= List of international cricket five-wicket hauls by Ravindra Jadeja =

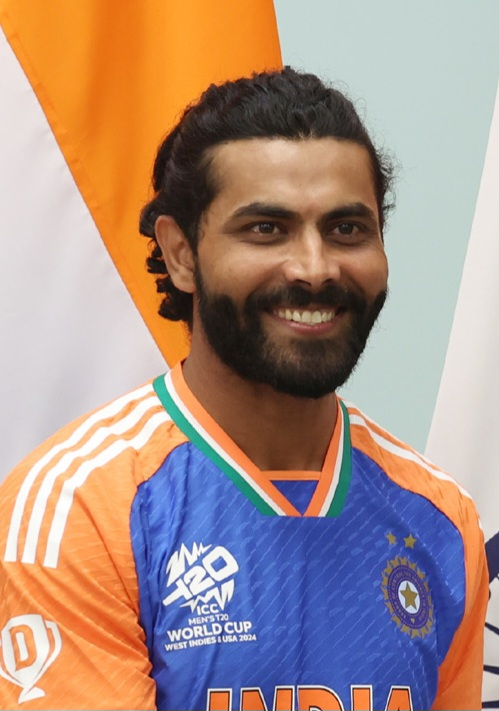
Jadeja has taken a pair of five-wicket hauls in a match on two occasions.

In cricket, a five-wicket haul (also known as a "fifer") refers to a bowler taking five or more wickets in a single innings. This is regarded as a notable achievement, and as of October 2024 only 54 bowlers have taken 15 or more five-wicket hauls at international level in their cricketing careers. Ravindra Jadeja – a left-arm slow left-arm orthodox bowler – is a Test, One Day International (ODI) and Twenty20 International (T20I) cricketer who represents the India national cricket team. As of October 2024, Jadeja has taken 17 five-wicket hauls in international cricket; 15 of them have come in Test cricket and 2 in ODIs, while he is yet to take a five-wicket haul in T20Is.

Jadeja made his Test debut in December 2012 against England. His career-best figures of seven wickets for 42 runs came against Australia in February 2023. He has picked up ten or more wickets in a match on two occasions. Jadeja made his ODI and T20I debuts in February 2009 against Sri Lanka, and his figures of five wickets for 33 runs against South Africa in the 2023 World Cup remain his best in ODIs, while his figures of three wickets for 15 runs against Sri Lanka are his best in T20Is.

== Key ==
Symbol	Meaning
Date	Day the Test started or ODI held
Inn	Innings in which five-wicket haul was taken
Overs	Number of overs bowled
Runs	Number of runs conceded
Wkts	Number of wickets taken
Econ	Runs conceded per over
Batsmen	Batsmen whose wickets were taken
Result	Result for the India team
†	10 or more wickets taken in the match
‡	Jadeja was selected as man of the match

== Tests ==
Five-wicket hauls in Test cricket
No.	Date	Ground	Against	Inn	Overs	Runs	Wkts	Econ	Batsmen	Result
1	22 March 2013 ‡	Feroz Shah Kotla Ground, Delhi	Australia	2	23	58	5	2.52	Shane Watson; Michael Clarke; Moises Henriques; Peter Siddle; Nathan Lyon	Won
2	6 November 2013 ‡	Punjab Cricket Association IS Bindra Stadium, Mohali	West Indies	2	12.1	40	5	3.28	Marlon Samuels; Shivnarine Chanderpaul; Denesh Ramdin; Veerasammy Permaul; Tino Best	Won
3	17 July 2014	Lord's Cricket Ground, London	England	3	12	48	5	4.00	Ian Bell; Joe Root; Ben Stokes; Matt Prior; Stuart Broad	Won
4	8 October 2016 ‡	Holkar Stadium, Indore	New Zealand	3	38.2	125	5	3.26	Martin Guptill; Tom Latham; Ronnie Hira; Jeetan Patel; Trent Boult	Won
5	9 November 2016	Saurashtra Cricket Association Stadium, Rajkot	England	2	30.4	78	5	2.54	Haseeb Hameed; Joe Root; Ben Stokes; Chris Woakes; Adil Rashid	Drawn
6	16 December 2016 ‡	M. A. Chidambaram Stadium, Chennai	England	4	25	48	7	1.92	Alastair Cook; Keaton Jennings; Joe Root; Moeen Ali; Ben Stokes; Jos Buttler; Stuart Broad	Won
7	16 March 2017 ‡	JSCA International Stadium Complex, Ranchi	Australia	3	46	124	5	2.69	David Warner; Steve Smith; Peter Handscomb; Matthew Wade; Nathan Lyon	Drawn
8	12 August 2017 ‡	Pallekele International Cricket Stadium, Kandy	Sri Lanka	2	16.1	45	5	2.78	Dimuth Karunaratne; Kusal Mendis; Angelo Mathews; Dilruwan Perera; Lakshan Sandakan	Won
9	4 October 2018 ‡	Saurashtra Cricket Association Stadium, Rajkot	West Indies	2	14	35	5	2.50	Kieran Powell; Roston Chase; Keemo Paul; Devendra Bishoo; Shermon Lewis	Won
10	4 March 2022 ‡	Punjab Cricket Association IS Bindra Stadium, Mohali	Sri Lanka	2	22	41	5	1.86	Dimuth Karunaratne; Angelo Mathews; Dhananjaya de Silva; Suranga Lakmal; Lahiru Kumara	Won
11	9 February 2023 ‡	Vidarbha Cricket Association Stadium, Nagpur	Australia	2	21	42	6	2.00	Marnus Labuschagne; Steve Smith; Matt Renshaw; Peter Handscomb; Pat Cummins; Todd Murphy	Won
12	25 January 2024	Rajiv Gandhi International Cricket Stadium, Hyderabad	England	2	18	65	5	3.61	Ollie Pope; Ben Stokes; Joe Root; Tom Hartley; Mark Wood	Lost
13	15 February 2024 ‡	Niranjan Shah Stadium, Rajkot	England	4	7	41	5	5.85	Ollie Pope; Joe Root; Jonny Bairstow; Ben Foakes; Tom Hartley	Won
14	27 September 2024 ‡	Green Park Stadium, Kanpur	Bangladesh	2	11.5	50	5	4.22	Liton Das; Shakib Al Hasan; Mehidy Hasan Miraz; Taijul Islam; Khaled Ahmed	Won
15	26 October 2024	M. Chinnaswamy Stadium, Bengaluru	New Zealand	2	22	65	5	2.95	Tom Latham; Daryl Mitchell; Tom Blundell; Glenn Phillips; Matt Henry	Lost

== One Day Internationals ==
Five-wicket hauls in One Day International cricket
No.	Date	Ground	Against	Inn	Overs	Runs	Wkts	Econ	Batsmen	Result
1	6 July 2013 ‡	Sabina Park, Kingston	West Indies	1	10	36	5	3.60	Johnson Charles; Marlon Samuels; Devon Smith; Darren Sammy; Sunil Narine	Won
2	5 November 2023 ‡	Eden Gardens, Kolkata	South Africa	2	9	33	5	3.66	Temba Bavuma; Heinrich Klaasen; David Miller; Keshav Maharaj; Kagiso Rabada	Won
