= Graeme Swann =

English cricket player (born 1979)

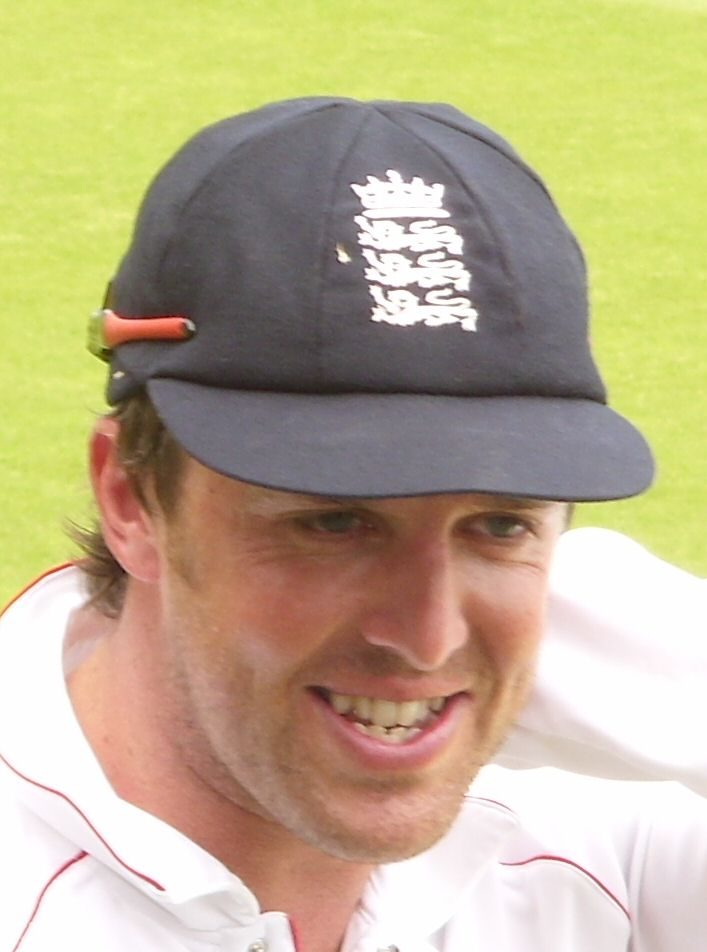
- Swann in 2009

Personal information
- Full name: Graeme Peter Swann
- Born: 24 March 1979 (age 47); Northampton, Northamptonshire, England
- Nickname: Chin, Swanny
- Height: 6 ft 1 in (1.85 m)
- Batting: Right-handed
- Bowling: Right-arm off break
- Role: Bowler
- Relatives: Raymond Swann (father); Alec Swann (brother)

International information
- National side: England (2000–2013)
- Test debut (cap 641): 11 December 2008 v India
- Last Test: 17 December 2013 v Australia
- ODI debut (cap 157): 23 January 2000 v South Africa
- Last ODI: 13 June 2013 v Sri Lanka
- ODI shirt no.: 66
- T20I debut (cap 37): 5 February 2008 v New Zealand
- Last T20I: 1 October 2012 v Sri Lanka

Domestic team information
- Years: Team
- 1998–2004: Northamptonshire
- 2005–2013: Nottinghamshire

Career statistics
Competition	Test	ODI	T20I	FC
Matches	60	79	39	252
Runs scored	1,370	500	104	7,811
Batting average	22.09	13.88	20.80	25.52
100s/50s	0/5	0/0	0/0	4/37
Top score	85	34	34	183
Balls bowled	15,349	3,809	810	47,541
Wickets	255	104	51	739
Bowling average	29.96	27.76	16.84	32.12
5 wickets in innings	17	1	0	32
10 wickets in match	3	0	0	6
Best bowling	6/65	5/28	3/13	7/33
Catches/stumpings	54/–	29/–	5/–	195/–
Medal record
Men's Cricket
Representing England
T20 World Cup
Winner	2010 West Indies
Champions Trophy
Runner-up	2013 England & Wales
- Source: CricketArchive, 22 December 2013

Graeme Peter Swann (born 24 March 1979) is an English former cricketer who played all three formats of the game. Born in Northampton, he attended Sponne School in Towcester, Northamptonshire. He was primarily a right-arm off-spinner, and also a capable late-order batsman with four first-class centuries, and often fielded at second slip. Swann could score quickly; his test strike rate is the third highest of any English batsman to have scored at least 1000 runs after Harry Brook and Ben Duckett. Swann was a member of the England team that won the 2010 ICC World Twenty20.

After initially playing for his home county Northamptonshire, for whom he made his debut in 1997, he moved to Nottinghamshire in 2005.

Swann played a very poor single One Day International against South Africa in 2000, before losing his place in the squad. Seven years later he was chosen to accompany England on its tour of Sri Lanka as the team's second spin bowler, alongside Monty Panesar, and subsequently cemented a regular place in England's Test team, playing throughout England's 2–1 victory in the 2009 Ashes. In December 2009, he became the first English spinner to take 50 wickets in a calendar year, culminating in back-to-back man of the match awards in the first two Tests of the tour of South Africa and rising to third place in the world rankings for bowlers.

In March 2010, Swann became the first English off-spinner since Jim Laker to take 10 wickets in a match when he achieved the feat in England's victory in the first Test in Bangladesh. In May, he was named ECB Cricketer of the Year. In 2011 Swann was part of the England team that claimed the No. 1 ranking in Test cricket and between July and October that year was the No. 1 ranked bowler in ODIs. During the 2013–14 Ashes series loss, he retired from international cricket on 21 December 2013 with immediate effect. After retirement, Swann took part in the BBC television show Strictly Come Dancing.

== Career ==
=== Early years (1998–2007) ===
Swann began his domestic career for Northamptonshire. As a teenager, he was part of the U-19 World Cup winning team in 1998, a tournament that took part in South Africa (alongside future England players Owais Shah and Rob Key).

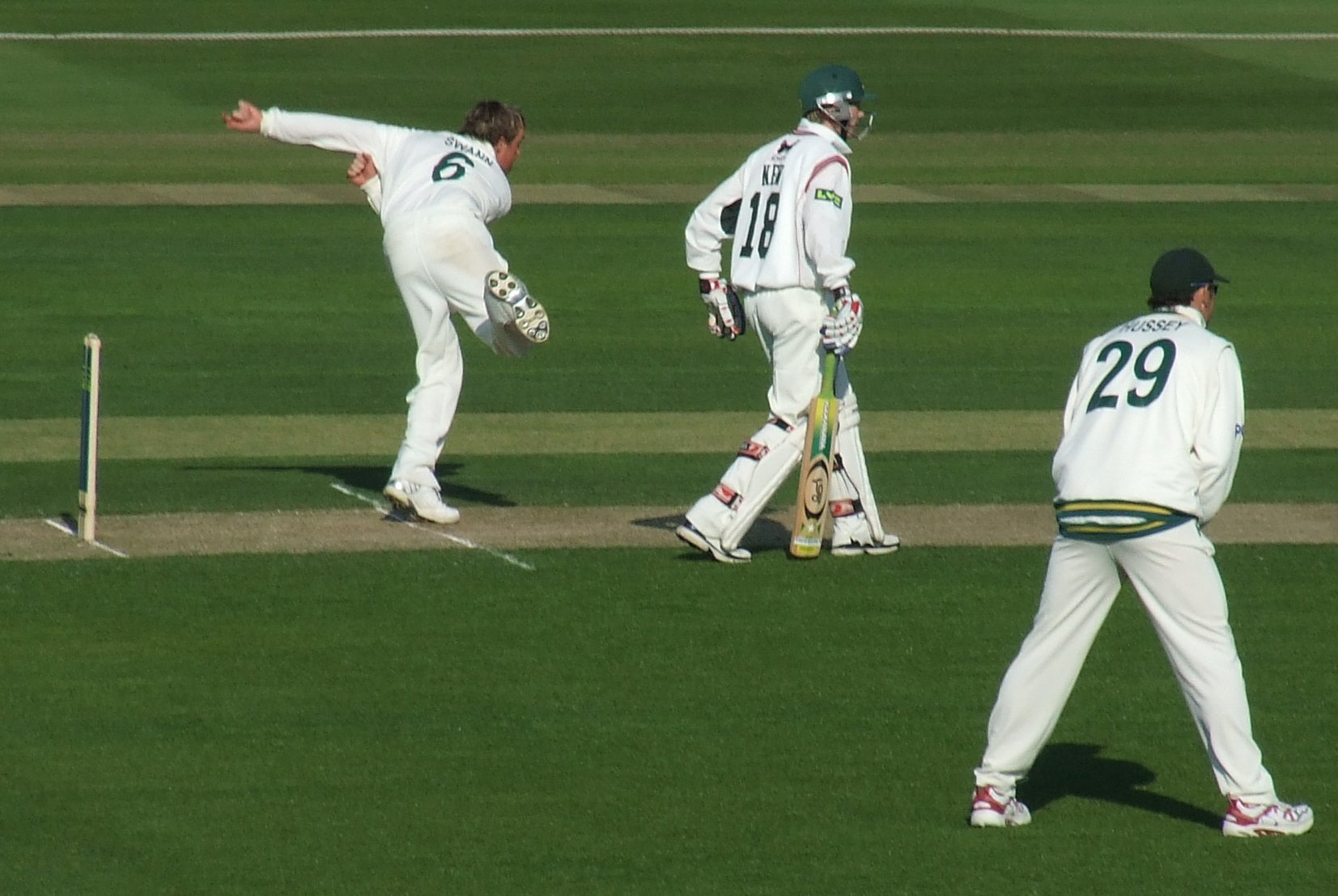
Swann bowling for Nottinghamshire against Leicestershire in 2007

Against Leicestershire in 1998 he scored 92 and 111, his maiden first-class half-century and century. Touring South Africa and Zimbabwe with the England A-team that winter, Swann took 21 wickets at 25.61 and averaged 22 with the bat. Wisden commented,

Swann did spin the ball appreciably and emerged as a definite candidate for elevation. He had the potential to become a genuine allrounder, with a wide range of attractive strokes, though he needs to use them more selectively.

In 1999, Swann was brought into the England squad for the final Test against New Zealand. He did not play, but featured in an ODI against South Africa following an injury to Ashley Giles. This tour also saw him miss the team bus once due to oversleeping.

In domestic cricket, Swann scored his highest first-class score of 183 in 2002, sharing a partnership of 318 with Northants captain Mike Hussey (310 not out).

He moved to Nottinghamshire in 2005, and finished the season of 2007 with 516 runs and 45 wickets, leading to his recall to the England team against Sri Lanka. While England fell heavily in defeat during the first match, Swann hit 34 to help seal victory in the second, and took four for 34 and hit 25 in the third as England took a two-one lead in the series.

An unsuccessful tour of New Zealand followed, and Swann was unable consistently to occupy a place in the England ODI team. He remained in the squad but faced tough competition from Samit Patel, who had already taken his first ODI five-wicket haul, against South Africa in his third match.

=== Test breakthrough (2008–2009) ===
Following a loss of form by Monty Panesar, alongside whom Swann had played for Northamptonshire, Swann made his Test debut against India in December 2008, and made an immediate impact, dismissing Gautam Gambhir with his third delivery and Rahul Dravid with his sixth, both lbw, thus becoming only the second player in Test history after Richard Johnson (also for England) to take two wickets in his first Test over.

In the Third Test in the West Indies in February 2009, he was brought back into the Test fold following the poor form of Panesar, and in this match collected his first five-wicket haul in a Test, 5 for 57 in the West Indies' first innings, including two wickets in two balls. This was the second-best performance ever by any spinner in Antigua. Swann also collected five wickets in the first of the West Indian innings in the Fourth Test.

In addition to a score of 63 not out batting at 9, he took six more wickets in the first home Test of 2009, again against the West Indies, at Lord's. This included three for sixteen in five overs in the first innings, removing Devon Smith, Shivnarine Chanderpaul and Brendan Nash.

At the end of the one-day series against the same opposition, the England players were permitted to rejoin their counties in the build-up to the 2009 ICC World Twenty20 tournament. Swann gave a good account of himself in the World Twenty20, bowling tidily for his five wickets "while showing the passion for playing for his country that," according to journalist Nick Hoult, "endears him to England supporters."

=== The Ashes (2009) ===
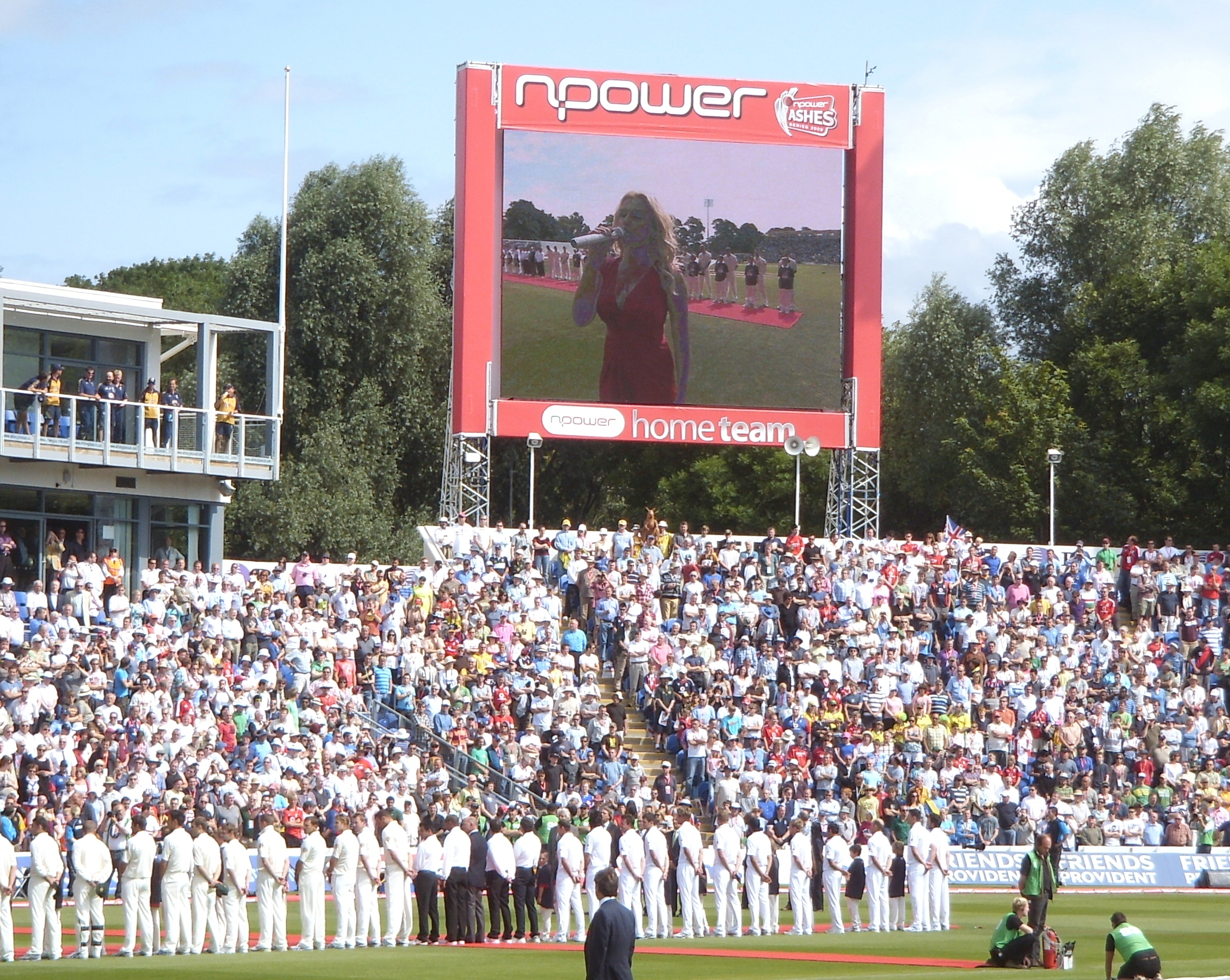
The players lined up at the start of the 2009 Ashes. England won the series 2–1, reclaiming the trophy from Australia.

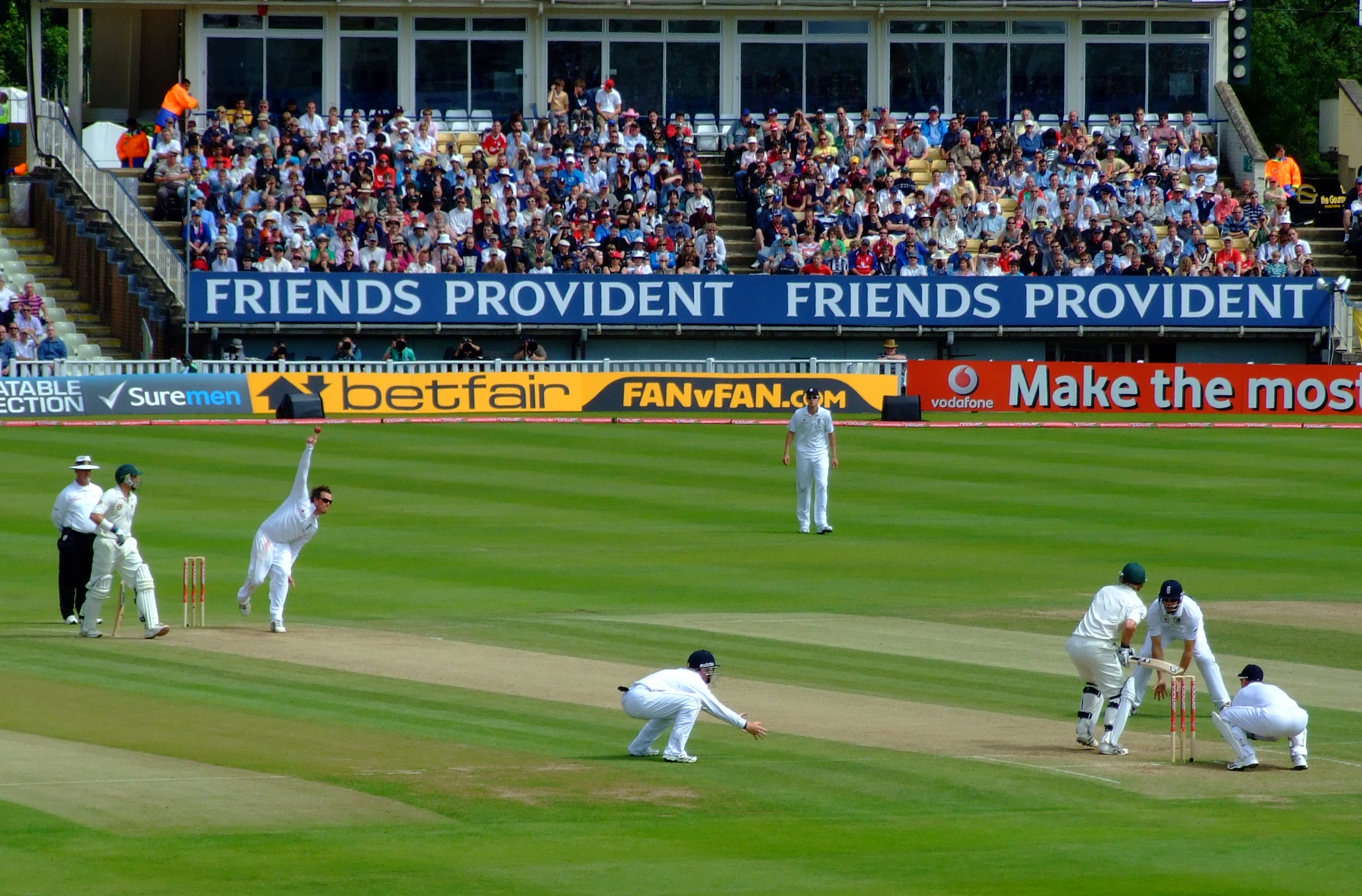
Swann bowling during the third Test of the 2009 Ashes

Swann had done enough in the year preceding the 2009 Ashes to be considered England's premier spinner, overtaking Panesar. The pertinent question was not whether Swann would play, but which of Panesar and Adil Rashid, the other two spinners in the England squad, would play with him. He went on to play in all five matches of the series. Panesar was selected for the first Test, but his bowling did not impress and he was dropped for the remainder of the series, leaving Swann as England's only slow bowler.

In the first Test at Sophia Gardens, Swann hit a first-innings 47 not out from 40 balls. His bowling was anodyne, failing to pick up a wicket in 38 overs in Australia's only innings, in which they amassed 674 for 6 declared with four centurions, but his second-innings 31 helped England salvage a draw, as Australia were unable to take the final English wicket with Panesar and James Anderson at the crease.

At Lord's, Swann was part of England's first-innings slide from 302 for 3 (Andrew Strauss 161) to 425 all out, and was only required to bowl one over in Australia's first innings, as England's seamers combined to bowl Australia out for 215. However, in Australia's second innings, after Michael Clarke and Brad Haddin had briefly made a mammoth 522-run target seem attainable, Swann combined with Andrew Flintoff (5 for 92) to bowl Australia out, taking the key wicket of Michael Clarke bowled for 136. Swann took the final wicket of Mitchell Johnson, bowled for 63, to finish with second-innings figures of 4 for 87 and complete England's first victory against Australia at Lord's since 1934.

At Edgbaston, Swann was only required to bowl two first-innings overs, but nonetheless made England's first breakthrough, trapping Simon Katich lbw to end an 85-run opening partnership. With the bat he contributed 24 from 20 balls as England's lower-middle order powered the team to a 113-run first-innings lead, and with England pursuing victory he clean bowled Ricky Ponting with a sharply turning offbreak, but on the final day his bowling was anodyne, failing to take another wicket as Australia drew the match with ease, losing only three wickets on the final day.

At Headingley Swann made a duck in England's first-innings collapse to 102 all out, and failed to take a wicket in Australia's total of 445. In the second innings he hit a defiant 62 but could not stave off an innings defeat.

England therefore progressed to the Oval with the series level at 1–1 and with a victory required to regain the Ashes. Swann took 4 for 38, combining with Stuart Broad (5 for 37) to bowl Australia out for 160. He hit a 55-ball 63 in England's second innings, sharing a 13-over partnership of 90 with debutant Jonathan Trott (119).

On the final day of the series Swann made England's first breakthrough in the fourth over of the day, trapping Simon Katich lbw. He claimed figures of 4 for 120, taking his tally of wickets to eight in the match, including the final wicket, Mike Hussey caught at short leg by Alastair Cook for 121, to clinch the Ashes series. He finished the series with an aggregate of 249 runs (fourth in England's list) at an average of 35.57, and 14 wickets (second among England's bowlers only to Stuart Broad).

Following the Ashes, the two teams faced each other in a seven-match ODI series. After losing the first six, England managed a win in the final fixture; Swann took 5/28 in the match, his first five-wicket haul in ODIs.

=== South Africa and Bangladesh (2009–2010) ===
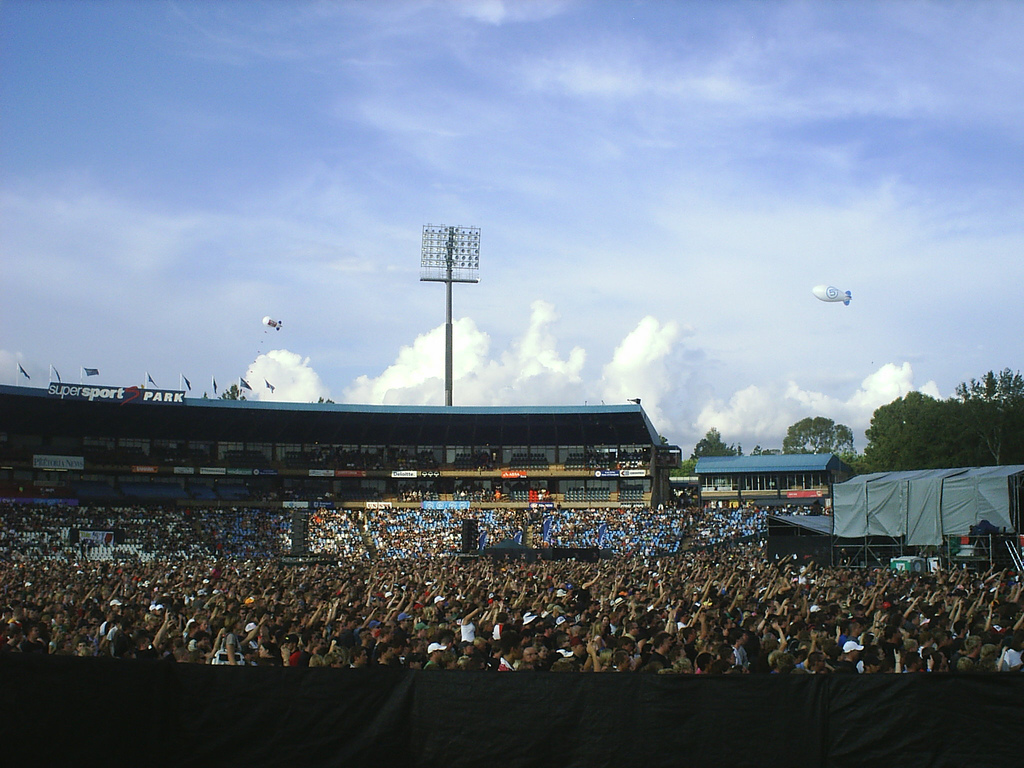
Centurion Cricket Ground, where Swann scored his Test-best innings of 85 in December 2009 and was awarded a man of the Match award for his all-round performance.

In December, England toured South Africa for a four-Test series. Expected to be a close contest, the series was tied 1–1. Swann contributed 21 wickets, and was the leading wicket-taker on either team in country not historically suited to spin bowlers. Ashwell Prince suffered in particular against Swann's bowling, and was dismissed three times from five deliveries by Swann. His lower-order batting also proved useful, helping save one match, and his Test-best knock of 85 in the first fixture was the highest score of the England innings. His performance in the second Test meant that Swann finished his first full year of Test cricket ranked third in the world bowling rankings, behind Dale Steyn and Mitchell Johnson. As well as Man of the Match awards in the first and second Tests, Swann received a tied man of the series award along with Mark Boucher.

England's next assignment was a tour of Bangladesh in March 2010. The ODI series was a 3–0 whitewash for England, with Swann taking seven wickets, behind just seamer Tim Bresnan with eight. Even with a weakened team, taking the opportunity to blood new players, England were expected to easily win the two-match Test series. In the first match Swann took his maiden ten-wicket haul in Tests; it was the first time an off-spinner had taken ten wickets in a match for England since Jim Laker took 19 against Australia at Old Trafford in 1956. The pitch at Chittagong offered little for fast bowlers, leaving Swann with the bulk of the work. The performance, claiming 10/217 from 78.3 overs, earned him the Man of the Match award and raised him to second place in the ICC's Test bowling rankings. Claiming six wickets in the second Test to guide England to a 2–0 whitewash, Swann was named Man of the Series.

=== 2010 World Twenty20 ===
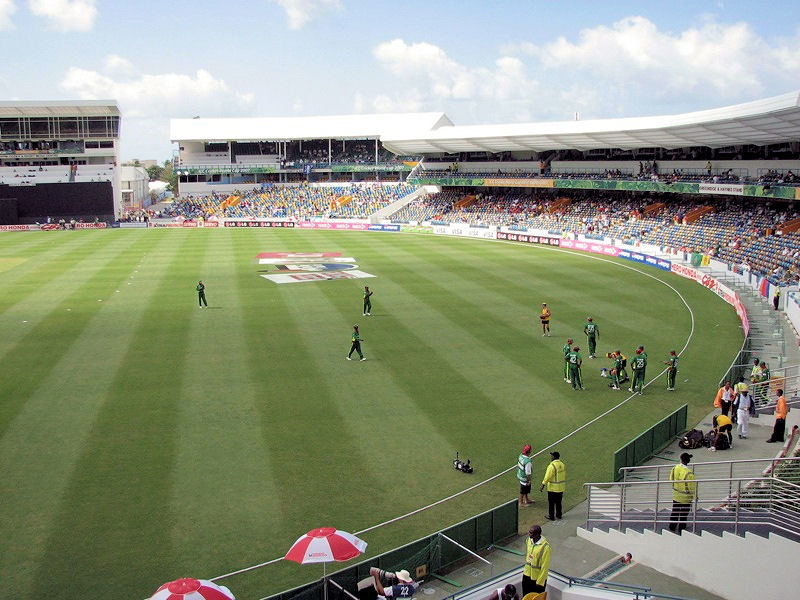
The Kensington Oval in Barbados hosted the final of the 2010 World Twenty20, which England won by seven wickets.

Swann was selected in England's 15 man squad for the 2010 ICC World Twenty20 in the West Indies. During the tournament, Swann played in all of England's fixtures, including the final against Australia, where he dismissed Australia captain Michael Clarke for 27 on his way to figures of 1/17 from his 4 overs. In the field he alertly caught Shane Watson in the slips after wicketkeeper Craig Kieswetter parried the ball toward Swann. Swann finished the tournament with 10 wickets at an average of 14.40, with best figures of 3/24 against South Africa in the super eights. Swann's performances won widespread applause for his ability to adapt to the different forms of the game and to retain control over his bowling. In May, he was named ECB Cricketer of the Year. The ECB declared his international career to be a "remarkable 12 months in which his attacking offspin and hard-hitting lower-order batting have proved instrumental in one of the most successful years that the England cricket team has ever known."

=== Pakistan (2010) ===
Pakistan toured England in August and September. Swann was ever-present in the four match Test series which England won 3–1, although he was only needed to bowl two overs in the first Test as the seamers bowled Pakistan out for 182 and 80. Swann also was not required in the first innings of the second Test at Edgbaston, before taking Test-best figures of 6–65 in the second innings as England took a 2–0 series lead. At The Oval, Pakistan won by 4 wickets, though Swann did take match figures of 7–118. In a remarkable Test at Lord's, England won by an innings and 225 runs victory, despite being 102–7 in their innings, with Swann taking 4–12 and 5–62. The latter achievement saw his name go on the Lord's honours board for the first time, however the match was overshadowed by newspaper allegations of Pakistan players being involved in spot-fixing.

=== 2010–11 Ashes ===
England toured Australia during the winter for the away Ashes series, England won the series 3–1 with Swann playing a vital role in holding up an end. He had success in the second test at Adelaide taking 7 wickets in the match and a match winning 5 wicket haul. He finished the series with 15 wickets at an average of 39.80, economy of 2.72 and a strike rate of 87.6, these figures are much greater to that of the several Australian spinners, Xavier Doherty and Michael Beer, with the latter making his debut in the final test at Sydney. Graeme Swann played a pivotal role in England's series success down under, with control and his wicket taking abilities when needed. He ended 2010 as England retained and then won the Ashes series in Australia, as the second highest-ranked bowler in world cricket, and the highest ranked spin bowler.

=== World Cup and 2011 English season ===
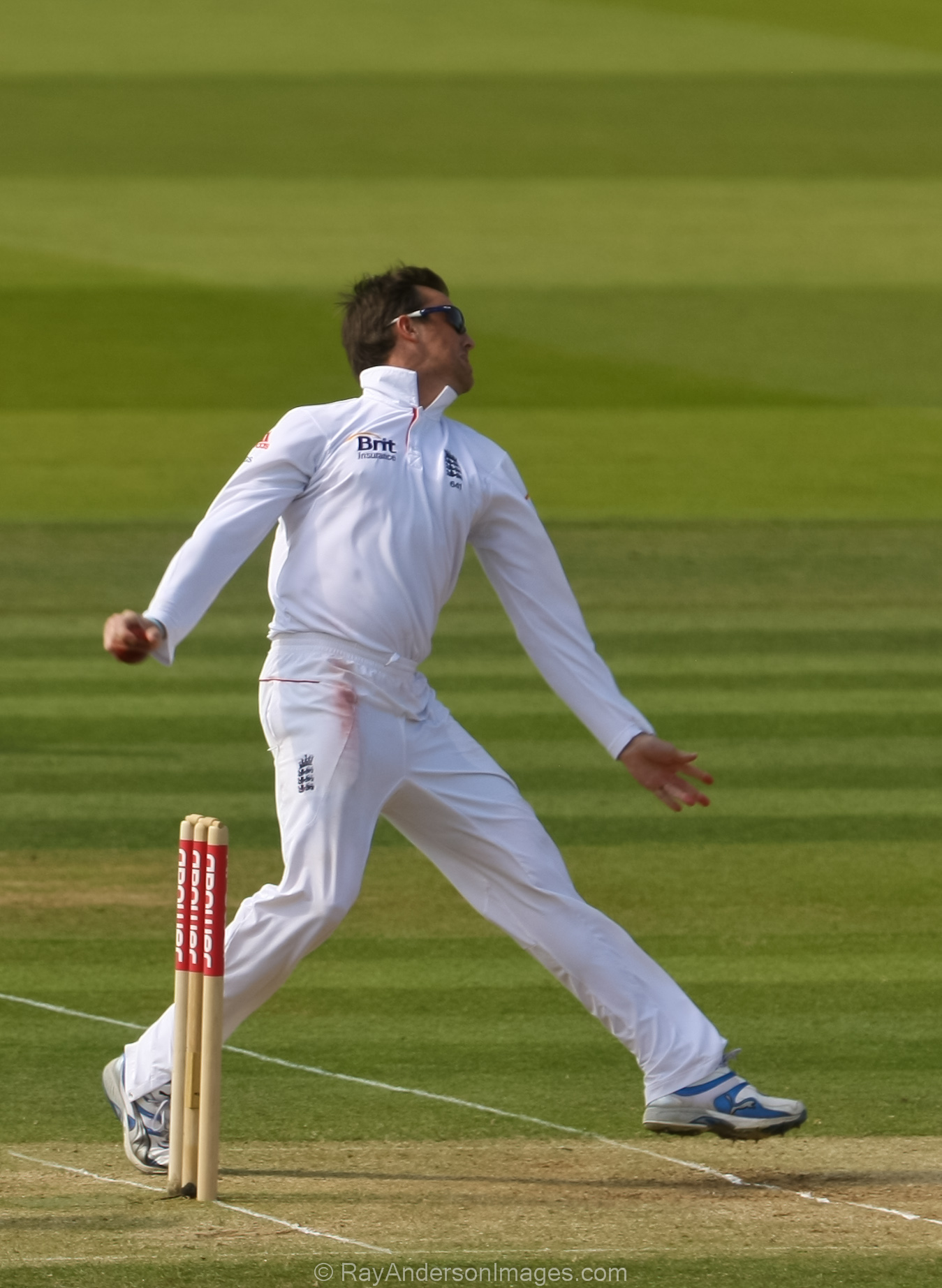
Swann bowling against Sri Lanka at Lord's in June 2011

Bangladesh, India, and Sri Lanka hosted the 2011 World Cup between February and April. England selected three spinners in their 15-man squad including Swann. England were knocked out in the quarter-finals. With 12 wickets from seven matches, Swann finished as England's highest wicket-taker in the tournament. Sri Lanka toured England in May. In the first Test Swann took 7/82 to help England to an innings victory. After winning the first match, England drew the second and third to win the series. Swann was the second-most productive bowler in the series, taking 12 wickets in the series at an average of 23.58, and was ranked as the second best Test bowler in the world. England won the following five-match ODI series 3–2. Swann took eight wickets and in the process rose to the No. 1 spot in the ICC's ODI bowler rankings. It was the first time since Steve Harmison in 2004 that an England bowler had held the No. 1 position in either Test or ODI cricket.

India toured in July. By winning the first three Tests, England deposed India as the No. 1 ranked Test team and took their place. England's seam attack troubled India's batsmen, leaving Swann little to do and he was restricted to four wickets at a cost of more than 80 runs each from the first three matches. However, in the final Test Swann's fortunes changed and he took nine wickets, including his 11th five-wicket haul in Tests, to help England to an innings victory and take the series in a 4–0 whitewash. A batch of new faces in India's squad for the subsequent ODI series was expected to prove a new challenge, however England won the series 3–0. Swann was leading wicket-taker in the series, with eight. When the West Indies toured in September for two T20Is. Both the regular captain and vice-captain, Stuart Broad and Eoin Morgan respectively, were injured at the time and Swann led the team in their absence. England toured India in October for five ODIs. After taking two wickets from four matches, and England lost the series 5–0, Swann dropped to third in the ICC's ODI bowler rankings.

=== Tours of UAE and Sri Lanka 2012 ===
The new year began with England's tour of the UAE where they played three Tests and five ODIs against Pakistan. England lost all three Tests as their batsmen struggled to adapt to Asian pitches, particularly the bowling of off-spinner Saeed Ajmal. On surfaces that suited spin bowling, 75 wickets in the series fell to spinners. He claimed 13 wickets at an average of 25.07, and dropped to sixth in the ICC's Test bowling rankings. England bounced back to complete a 4–0 whitewash in the subsequent ODI series, and Swann contributed two wickets from three matches.

Swann was one of 144 players who put their names forward for the auction ahead of the 2012 Indian Premier League; though he was one of three players given the highest possible reserve price of $400,000 he was not bought by any of the franchises. England toured Sri Lanka for two Tests beginning in March. The series was drawn 1–1 and Swann took ten wickets in England's victory in the second Test. His worth to the team was recognised when the Professional Cricketers' Association named Swann England's Most Valued Player of the winter and gave him a £2,000 prize. Speaking of the award, Swann said "It is nice to win any award but it is especially pleasing to win one where you are compared to your team-mates on hard statistics".

=== Elbow problems and recovery (2012–13) ===
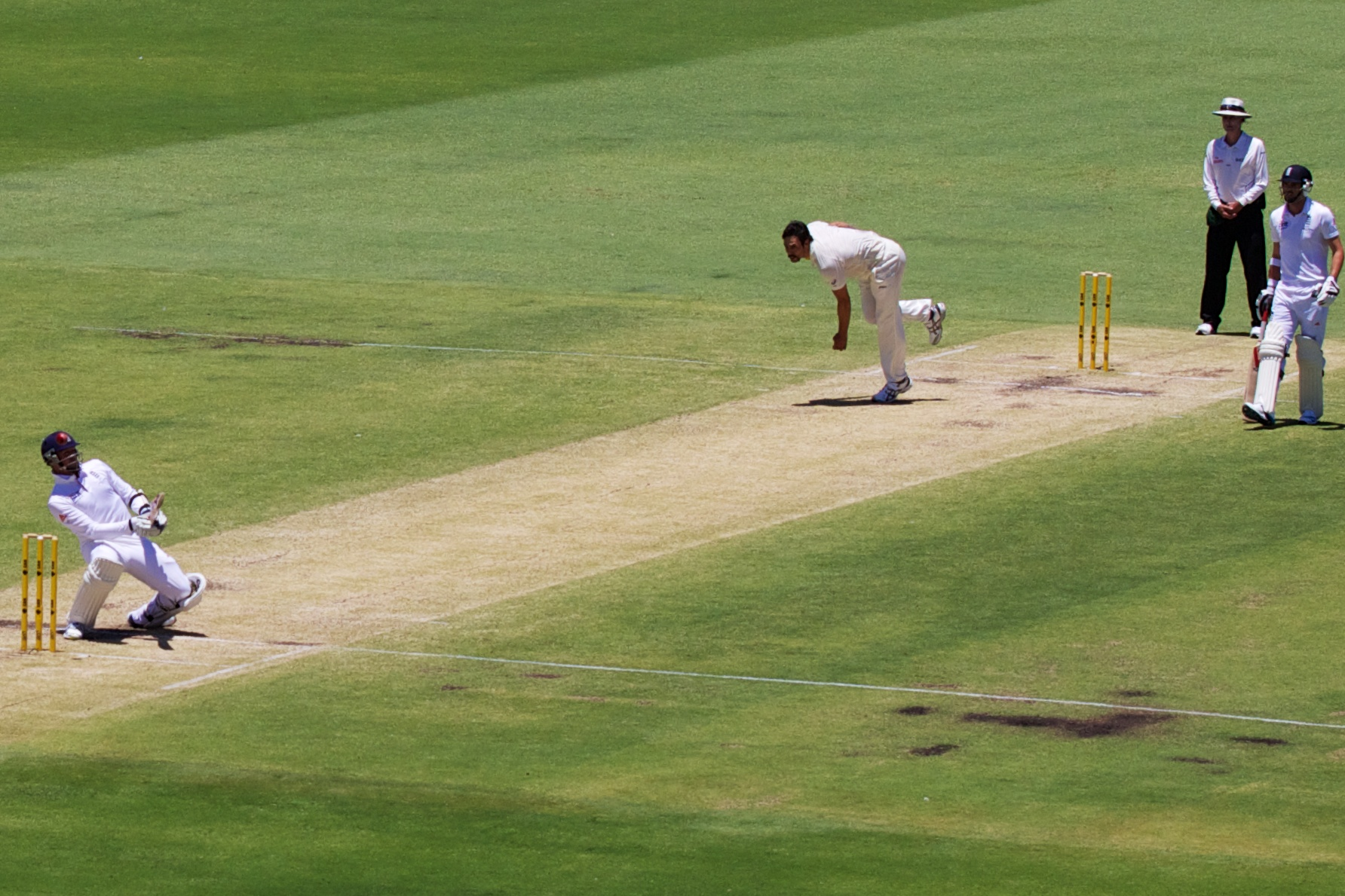
Swann batting during the 2013–14 Ashes in Australia

South Africa's tour of England was billed in the press as the clash of the two best Test teams in world cricket. Though England had lost to Pakistan and drawn with Sri Lanka in the winter, English conditions were expected to favour their seam bowlers and spin would play a less significant role in the series. At Headingley England opted for an all pace bowling attack, leaving Swann out of the team for the first time in 43 Tests. In the event Kevin Pietersen was called on to bowl 16 overs in the match and took 4 wickets with his part-time off-breaks and Swann was immediately recalled to the team. England lost the three-Test series 2–0, and South Africa took over as the No. 1 ranked Test team. Swann finished with 4 wickets (as many as Pietersen in one match) at an average of 77. Swann was rested for the final three matches of the five game ODI series against South Africa which followed due to a problem with his elbow and was replaced in the team by Kent spinner James Tredwell. He had previously filled in for Swann in ODIs when the latter was unavailable or rested.

In September and October, Sri Lanka hosted the 2012 ICC World Twenty20. England were the defending champions but were knocked out in the Super 8 stage after losing three out of their five matches. Swann played in all five matches, managing seven wickets and was the team's joint second-highest wicket-taker behind fast bowler Steven Finn.

A recurrence of an old elbow injury prevented Swann from joining England on the tour of New Zealand in March 2013. After undergoing surgery on his elbow, Swann was fit enough to return to the team when New Zealand toured England in May and June 2013.

On 21 December 2013, Swann announced his retirement from all cricket with immediate effect. At this point, England were 3–0 down in the Ashes 2013-14 series.

== Bowling style ==
What has struck me most is that as an offspinner there are only certain ways you can get people out. But he [Swann] has more than that, he really changes his pace well. Normally when spinners bowl faster they lose their spin. But he can bowl quicker deliveries and still turn it. It is a very good gift and he can adapt it to all forms of the game. He is always trying to work out in his mind how to get wickets. That is what I like about him – he attacks.

— Shane Warne in May 2010 describing Swann as the "most improved cricketer in the world".

Swann is noted for being an attacking spinner, generally delivering the ball with plenty of flight and bounce. He is also capable of subtle changes of pace. Unlike many contemporary off-spinners he does not bowl the doosra. Instead, his variations include a well-developed arm ball, and also a flatspinner/slider delivery that he has nicknamed his "flying saucer ball" that rotates around its vertical axis and generally bounces straight on. Swann also noted that he has a very different grip to the textbook grip of simply resting the tip of the index and middle fingers on the seam. He jams the seam as far as their second knuckles and almost coming out like a googly on the back of the hand on release. Because of this, he can spread the two fingers very wide apart. Commentator Peter Roebuck suggested in March 2010 that Swann's success has been due as much to his attitude as skill:

He plays cricket like a man eager for a scrap and not too bothered about the niceties. He bowls like a man expecting to take wickets and unaware that fingerspin had been consigned to the dustbin (at any rate unless it was backed up by a mystery ball or curious conveyance and bewildering progress). Swann had no such weapon at his disposal and still rose to the top.

== Strictly Come Dancing ==
From 8 September 2018 Swann participated in the sixteenth series of Strictly Come Dancing with professional dance partner Oti Mabuse. The pair reached week 10 and finished in 7th place in the series.

== Personal life ==
Swann married Sarah on 29 January 2010. They live in Nottingham with their three children. He revealed on the BBC's Football Focus that he supports Newcastle United and Blyth Spartans football clubs.

He is the lead singer of the rock band Dr Comfort and the Lurid Revelations which plays cover songs in gigs around Nottinghamshire.

On 2 April 2010 he was stopped by police in West Bridgford, Nottingham following a party and was arrested after providing a positive breath test. He was charged in June, to appear in court in August, and initially told court that he was on his way to purchase screwdrivers in order to rescue his cat from under the floorboards. Due to his cricketing commitments, the trial had several adjournments before he was cleared in February 2011, on the grounds that the blood sample could not be used as evidence.

Swann became a summariser for the BBC's Test Match Special in February 2014. He joined the TNT commentary team for the 2025/26 Men's Ashes tour of Australia.
