= Sponne School =

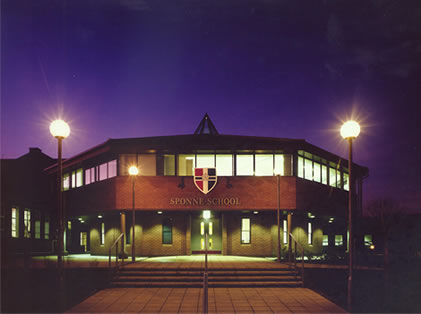

Location
- Brackley Road; Towcester, Northamptonshire, NN12 6DJ; England
- Coordinates: 52°07′56″N 0°59′37″W

Information
- Type: Academy
- Established: 15th century
- Founder: William Sponne
- Trust: Tove Learning Trust
- Department for Education URN: 136488 Tables
- Ofsted: Reports
- Headteacher: Graham Forbes
- Gender: Mixed
- Age: 11 to 19
- Enrolment: 1358
- Colours: Red, Blue and White
- Website: http://www.sponne.org.uk

Sponne School in Towcester, Northamptonshire, England, is the oldest secondary school in Northamptonshire, and one of the oldest in the country. Part of the school was originally Towcester Grammar School, until grammar schools were abolished in Northamptonshire. In 1968, Towcester Grammar School was joined with the next-door Secondary Modern school, and the school was renamed Sponne, after Archdeacon William Sponne, who was Rector at the nearby St. Lawrence Church in the 15th century and the original founder of the school.

Sponne School is a co-educational secondary school and sixth form, with 1358 pupils on the roll, around 200 of whom are in the Sixth Form. It is registered as a specialist science and music academy. The school is a member of the Tove Learning Trust, the CEO of which is Dr Jamie Clarke. The Headteacher of the school is Graham Forbes.

== Physical layout ==
- The staff room, main reception and senior staff offices are in the centre of the school.
- C Block - Consists of most of the art rooms, a computer room and senior staff offices.
- D Block - Business and Innovation block, including 5 computer rooms, 3 workshops, 2 kitchens and 1 Textile room and 1 Business/Economics teaching room.
- T Block - Rather than a block of classrooms, this block is a series of mobiles, used for humanities, drama, and music.
- E Block - The ground floor is where the 6th form common room is, along with some social sciences rooms and 1 computer room. The 1st floor is used to teach modern foreign languages, mainly French and German. The 3rd floor is dedicated to Mathematics. One room, E40, is halfway between the second and third floors. This is a computer room and in 2008 was reassigned from the ICT faculty to the Mathematics faculty.
- H Block - This is the main hall.
- M Block - Until September 2006, separate from the rest of the school. It contains most of the Music classrooms.

On the right end of the school is the Sports Hall and changing rooms, located opposite the E Block.

- S Block - Used for all the Science Subjects. Also used as an introduction area for primary school children moving up to Sponne.
- W Block - The old Grammar School building, rebuilt in 1928 after a fire. This area is for Humanities, English, Business Studies and Drama. The front section of the block is a Grade II listed building.
- HLRC - Hesketh Learning Resource Centre, technically part of the C block. It is a library containing computers, books, newspapers and desks for pupils to work. It is managed by employed library staff.

There are two residential houses in the school; they both used to be occupied by the care-takers. The house at the front of school is now the GUTP office. There is also a 4-acre (16,000 m^{2}) field at the back of the school. It is repainted in the summer and the winter with two football pitches, a hockey pitch, 2 rugby pitches, a 400 m track and a 100 m track. It also has two long jump sandpits, and 2 discus circles. Adjacent to the field is a set of tennis courts.

== Media attention ==
Sponne was one of the first schools in Britain to switch its dietary policies following celebrity chef Jamie Oliver's anti–obesity TV campaign. In July 2006, 13-year-old William Guntrip set up a playground sweet shop to counteract what he considered to be "overpriced health food". Guntrip took more than £50 a day, selling chocolate bars and fizzy drinks to other pupils during break times. He was allegedly threatened with expulsion and the story was picked up by the national media.

== Sixth form ==
Sponne School offers a Sixth Form for pupils in Year 12 and 13. The Sixth Form provides A-Level grade education and provides the same courses as a sixth form college. Uniform is smart-casual. At the start of Year 12, pupils chooses between 3 and 5 A-Level subjects to study. The school holds a Sixth Form open evening for both internal and external candidates and provides prospective pupils with choice application forms. After a month of Year 12, pupils generally drop one subject; the majority of pupils study 3 subjects to A-Level. Sixth Form classes are smaller than standard secondary school lessons, allowing teachers to provide a more in depth level of teaching.

== Notable pupils ==
England international and Nottinghamshire offspin bowler Graeme Swann attended the school between 1990 and 1997. Swann's older brother, Alec, also a first class cricketer for Lancashire, was at the school between 1988 and 1995. His father Raymond, who had previously played cricket for Northumberland and Bedfordshire, was a Mathematics and P.E. teacher at the school.

The former Doncaster Rovers attacking midfielder Harry Forrester attended the school between 2003 and 2008. Elliot Parish is an English professional footballer who plays as a goalkeeper. Hannah Barnes, a cyclist who has represented Great Britain, attended the school. International orchestral and opera conductor, Martyn Brabbins attended Sponne school in the 1970s.

== Head teachers ==
- 1890-1920: John Wetherell
- 1920-1955: P.G.F.Clark
- 1955-1960: Mr Beacock
- 1960-1969: Jack Searle
- 1969-1991: John Mayes
- 1991-2003: Ian Brown
- 2003-2014: Jamie Clarke
- 2014–2024: Iain Massey
- 2024–Present: Graham Forbes

== See also ==
- List of the oldest schools in the United Kingdom
