= Stuart Broad =

English former cricketer and commentator (born 1986)

Stuart Broad CBE
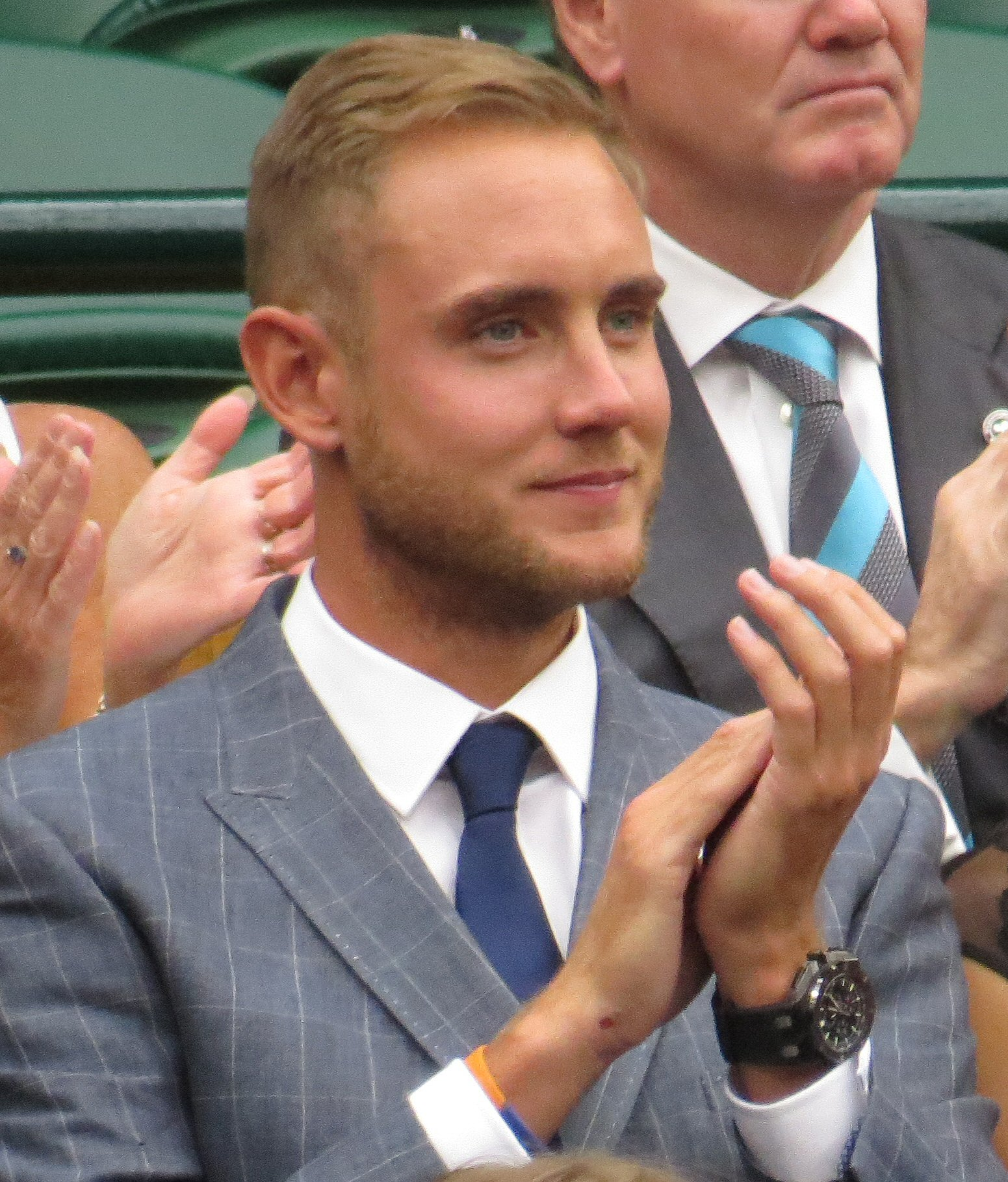
- Broad in 2014

Personal information
- Full name: Stuart Christopher John Broad
- Born: 24 June 1986 (age 40); Nottingham, Nottinghamshire, England
- Nickname: Broady, Malfoy
- Height: 6 ft 5 in (196 cm)
- Batting: Left-handed
- Bowling: Right-arm fast-medium
- Role: Bowler
- Relatives: Chris Broad (father), Mollie King (fiancée)

International information
- National side: England (2006–2023)
- Test debut (cap 638): 9 December 2007 v Sri Lanka
- Last Test: 27 July 2023 v Australia
- ODI debut (cap 197): 30 August 2006 v Pakistan
- Last ODI: 14 February 2016 v South Africa
- ODI shirt no.: 8 (previously 39)
- T20I debut (cap 18): 28 August 2006 v Pakistan
- Last T20I: 31 March 2014 v Netherlands
- T20I shirt no.: 8 (previously 39)

Domestic team information
- Years: Team
- 2005–2007: Leicestershire
- 2008–2023: Nottinghamshire
- 2016/17: Hobart Hurricanes

Career statistics
Competition	Test	ODI	T20I	FC
Matches	167	121	56	265
Runs scored	3,662	529	118	5,840
Batting average	18.03	12.30	7.37	19.08
100s/50s	1/13	0/0	0/0	1/25
Top score	169	45*	18*	169
Balls bowled	33,698	6,109	1,173	50,126
Wickets	604	178	65	952
Bowling average	27.68	30.13	22.93	26.71
5 wickets in innings	20	1	0	32
10 wickets in match	3	0	0	4
Best bowling	8/15	5/23	4/24	8/15
Catches/stumpings	55/–	27/–	21/–	93/–
Medal record
Men's Cricket
Representing England
T20 World Cup
Winner	2010 West Indies
Champions Trophy
Runner-up	2013 England & Wales
- Source: ESPNcricinfo, 31 July 2023

Stuart Christopher John Broad CBE (born 24 June 1986) is an English cricket commentator and former cricketer who played Test cricket for the England cricket team and captained the team in One Day and Twenty20 Internationals. Broad was a member of the England team that won the 2010 ICC World Twenty20. His longevity, and highly successful partnership with fellow fast bowler James Anderson cemented him as one of England's greatest ever Test bowlers.

A right-arm seam bowler and left-handed batsman, Broad began his professional career at Leicestershire; in 2008 he transferred to Nottinghamshire, the county of his birth and the team for which his father played. In August 2006 he was voted the Cricket Writers' Club Young Cricketer of the Year. In the fourth Test of the 2015 Ashes series Broad took career-best figures of 8/15 in the Australian first innings as they were dismissed for just 60. This performance was named as Wisden's Men's Test spell of the decade.

Broad was awarded the Man of the Match in the fifth Test of the 2009 Ashes series at the Oval, after figures of 5/37 in the afternoon session of the second day. On 30 July 2011, at the Nottingham Test match against India, he achieved a Test match hat-trick in the process gaining his then best Test figures of 6/46. As a batsman, he holds the second-highest Test score ever made by a number 9, having scored 169 against Pakistan in August 2010. At the start of the summer in 2012 Broad, returning from injury, produced figures of 7/72 in a match haul of 11 wickets against the West Indies. He is England's second-highest wicket taker in Test cricket. In December 2021, in the second match of the 2021–22 Ashes series, Broad played in his 150th Test match.

During the 2023 Ashes series against Australia, Broad joined the small list of bowlers to take 600 wickets in Test cricket. Broad is only the second fast bowler and second bowler for England to reach the milestone after James Anderson, who was bowling alongside him that day. He is England's second most-capped Test cricketer after Anderson. On 29 July 2023, Broad announced his retirement from all forms of cricket. In his farewell match at The Oval on the concluding day of the Ashes, Broad hit a six from the last ball he faced, then took a wicket with the final ball he bowled to win the Test for the home side.

== Early life ==
Broad was born 12 weeks prematurely and his life was saved by a doctor called John, after whom he was (middle) named when he survived.

At the age of 16, he considered himself better at playing hockey and played as a goalkeeper, for Leicestershire and the Midlands, and had a trial with an England underage team.

=== Education ===
Broad was educated at Brooke Priory School and Oakham School, a co-educational independent school in the market town of Oakham in Rutland, where he was in the same year as England Rugby back-row Tom Croft. Broad finished his school career with three B grades at A-level, and was given the choice of a place at Durham University or a contract with Leicestershire County Cricket Club.

== Domestic career ==
Broad originally started his cricketing career as an opening batsman, following in the footsteps of his father, the former England opener and current ICC match referee Chris Broad. It was not until he was 17 and had a growth spurt that he started to consider being a fast bowler. Broad had been associated with Leicestershire since he was 8 years old, having represented them at Under-9 level, and played for Melton Mowbray club Egerton Park, which also produced England seamer Tim Munton. Broad played for Egerton Park from the ages of 9 to 19; in his final two seasons he opened the batting with fellow Leicestershire player Matthew Boyce and spearheaded the attack. He was awarded the Leicestershire Young Cricketers Batsman Award in 1996.

Broad played his first game for Leicestershire 2nd XI in 2004 just before his 18th birthday and impressed enough to be given a full contract for the following season. Broad continued to impress Director of Cricket James Whitaker and made his first-class debut early in the 2005 season against Durham University Centre of Cricketing Excellence. He returned creditable figures of 1/40 from 15 overs. His maiden first-class wicket was that of Nick Lamb. Broad followed this appearance with his first County Championship appearance against Somerset at the familiar location of Oakham.

In the 2006 season Broad took his first 5 wicket haul against championship favourites Surrey and scored his first championship 50 against Derbyshire. His most eye-catching performances were in the Twenty20 Cup, where his economy of 4.50 was the second-best of the season of bowlers with more than 15 overs bowled. In the County Championship Broad played twelve of Leicestershire's 13 matches until called up for England, and his 44 wickets at an average of 31.38 meant he led his county both in terms of wickets and bowling average. On 23 August 2007 it was announced that Broad would be leaving Leicestershire at the end of the season to join Nottinghamshire, after choosing not to renew his contract and to return to his home county. In the 2013 season, Broad played in the final of the Yorkshire Bank 40 tournament. He was out for a duck and got three wickets in his last over wrapping up the game against Glamorgan. Broad was a part of the Nottinghamshire side that beat Surrey in the final of the Royal London One Day Cup in 2017 played at Lords.

== International career ==
=== Development ===
Broad played for the England Under-19 squad in 2005, facing the Sri Lankan Under-19 squad, and took five for seventeen in the first ’Test’ at Shenley. He was named in the ECB National Academy squad for the winter of 2005–06 and was then called up to the England ‘A’ squad touring the West Indies, as a replacement for James Anderson, who had been drafted into the Test side touring India. In April 2006, Broad was again called up to the England A squad, facing the touring Sri Lankan team.

Broad was also included in the ECB's 25-man development squad for the 2006 season. David Graveney, the chairman of selectors, said, "The squad essentially enables the England Head Coach (Duncan Fletcher), working with his support staff and the National Academy staff, to monitor more closely the development of international players and better prepare them for the demands of the international game."

=== 2006–07: Pakistan, West Indies, India, T20 World Cup and Sri Lanka ===
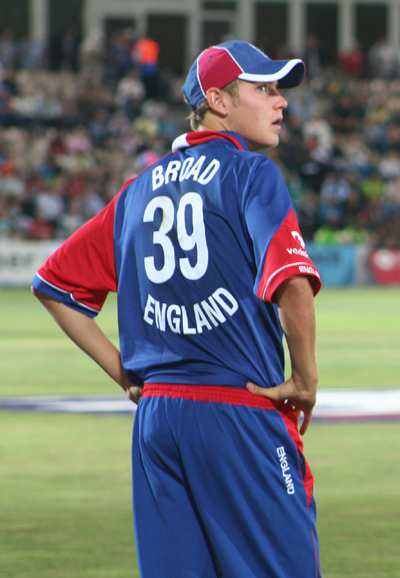
Broad playing against Pakistan in the 3rd ODI at the Rose Bowl in 2006

On 23 August 2006, Broad was included in the England one-day squad for the one-day internationals against Pakistan, and a couple of days later was named Young Cricketer of the Year by the Cricket Writers' Club. On 28 August, Broad made his first England appearance, in the Twenty20 International against Pakistan. Broad bowled four overs for 35 runs, and took two wickets in two balls, Shoaib Malik and Younis Khan, and narrowly missed out on a hat-trick, after a lofted shot from Shahid Afridi fell just short of Kevin Pietersen. On 30 August, he made his ODI debut, taking a wicket in his first over, as well as being involved in a last-wicket partnership of 29 with Darren Gough. In the third ODI on 5 September 2006, Broad once again found himself on a hat-trick with the wickets of Abdul Razzaq and Kamran Akmal, but again missed out on the third. He bowled ten overs and ended with figures of three for 57 with one maiden.

Broad was left out of the squad for the 2006 ICC Champions Trophy and the 2006-07 Commonwealth Bank Series. However, he was called up for the finals in the latter following injuries to Jon Lewis and Chris Tremlett. He was also called into England's squad as a replacement partway through the 2007 World Cup. He finished the tournament by scoring the winning runs in England's final match against the West Indies.

Broad also featured in the ODI squad at the end of the West Indies tour of England in summer 2007, taking three for twenty in the first match to take England to a 1–0 lead in the ODI series. In the second ODI he took 2–49 but England lost the match by 61 runs. Broad was expensive in the final match of the series, conceding 71 runs for no wickets.

He took his first wicket against India in the ODI against them in the second match at Bristol. On 30 August, he took career-best bowling figures of four for 51 as England bowled out India for 212 in the fourth match of the summer's ODI series. Broad also hit an unbeaten 45 to take his first ODI Man of the Match award. The definitive unbeaten partnership of 99 runs he shared with Ravi Bopara is a record eighth-wicket stand for England in ODIs. He bowled poorly in the next match, taking 1–84 as India won by 38 runs. He took 2–46 at the Oval but India narrowly won the match by 2 runs.

Broad took 1–29 in the opening match of the 2007 world T20 against Zimbabwe. He followed this up by taking 0–23 against Australia as England lost by eight wickets. He took 3–37 against South Africa but England suffered another defeat, this time by 19 runs. He took 1–35 against New Zealand but could not prevent another defeat for England.

On 19 September 2007, Indian batsman Yuvraj Singh hit six sixes from one Broad over in a group match at Kingsmead Cricket Ground in Durban, South Africa, during 2007's ICC World Twenty20. The 36 runs from the Broad over helped Yuvraj Singh make the quickest 50 in international cricket, off just 12 balls. Referring to this rare occurrence as "Yuvraj's magic moment", Phil Long of BBC's Test Match Special blogged: "Every so often you have to take off your England sunhat, sit back and enjoy a once-in-lifetime 'I was there' moment." This was the fourth time the feat had been performed in senior cricket and the first time in Twenty20 cricket. The performance was not repeated in any form of international cricket against a Test-playing nation until Kieron Pollard did the same against Sri Lanka in a T20 International in 2021.

Broad enjoyed a hugely successful ODI series in Sri Lanka in October 2007, taking eleven wickets in the series at an average of 19.27. He took figures of 2–54 in the first match and followed this up with 2–42 in the second match. In the third match of the series Broad made an unbeaten 20 with the bat and took another two wickets. In the final match of the series he took 3–36 and although England lost the match by over 100 runs, they won the series three-two to record its first ever ODI series win in Sri Lanka. This resulted in Broad making his Test debut against Sri Lanka in Colombo in December 2007. In a high scoring game, he took a single wicket, conceding 95 runs in the process as the match ended in a draw.

=== 2008: New Zealand, South Africa and India ===
Broad went on to have an equally successful ODI series against New Zealand. Although England fell to a three-one defeat, Broad was the leading wicket taker and held the highest batting average, 52, in the England team. During the tour of New Zealand in 2008, Broad, along with Alastair Cook and James Anderson, posed naked for the Cosmopolitan paper with just a cricket bat for cover. England won the first Test against New Zealand by 121 runs, with Broad taking figures of 3–54 to help England win the game.

In the first Test against New Zealand on home soil, Broad took three wickets in the match. England won the second match by six wickets, although Broad picked up no wickets in the match. On 6 June 2008, Broad scored his maiden Test fifty, against New Zealand at Trent Bridge, making 64 before being bowled by Chris Martin. In the first ODI against New Zealand Broad took 2–14, before taking another two wickets in the final match of the series, conceding fifty runs in the process.

He made his second Test fifty in July 2008, in the Test series against South Africa, scoring a new best of 76. In the Second Test at Headingley, Broad contributed seventeen runs in the first innings, as England was bowled out on the first day for 203. In the second innings, with the match already lost, Broad top-scored with 67 in an innings that included some impressive drives through midwicket and cover, giving further evidence of his batsmanship. After this, his Test batting average briefly rose above 40. His performances with the bat at the time led pundits to suggest that he may become a genuine all rounder, with Geoffrey Boycott comparing him to Garfield Sobers: "He's a wonderful player. There's a little bit of Sobers in him". Broad was dropped for the following Test at Edgbaston, making way for the returning Paul Collingwood. England captain Michael Vaughan said he was left out because of his bowling and due to fatigue. Broad duly took seven wickets for Nottinghamshire against Durham while the Test was being played.

On 26 August 2008, he recorded the first five-wicket haul in his international career with best figures of five for 23 against South Africa at his home ground in the second ODI of the series, with England winning the series 4–0 with Broad taking 8 wickets within the series at an average of 18.4 and shooting up to 4th in the ICC ODI world rankings, the highest in his career and the best by any English bowler since Andrew Flintoff in 2003.

In the second ODI against India Broad performed well, taking figures of 4–55. He took 1–36 in the next match as England lost by 18 runs. In the final match of the series he took 1–54, but England lost again, this time by six wickets. In the second Test against India, Broad was ineffectual with the ball. He took 1–84 in an India's first innings before taking 1–50 in India's second innings as the match ended in a draw.

=== 2009: West Indies, Ashes, ICC Champions Trophy and T20 World Cup ===
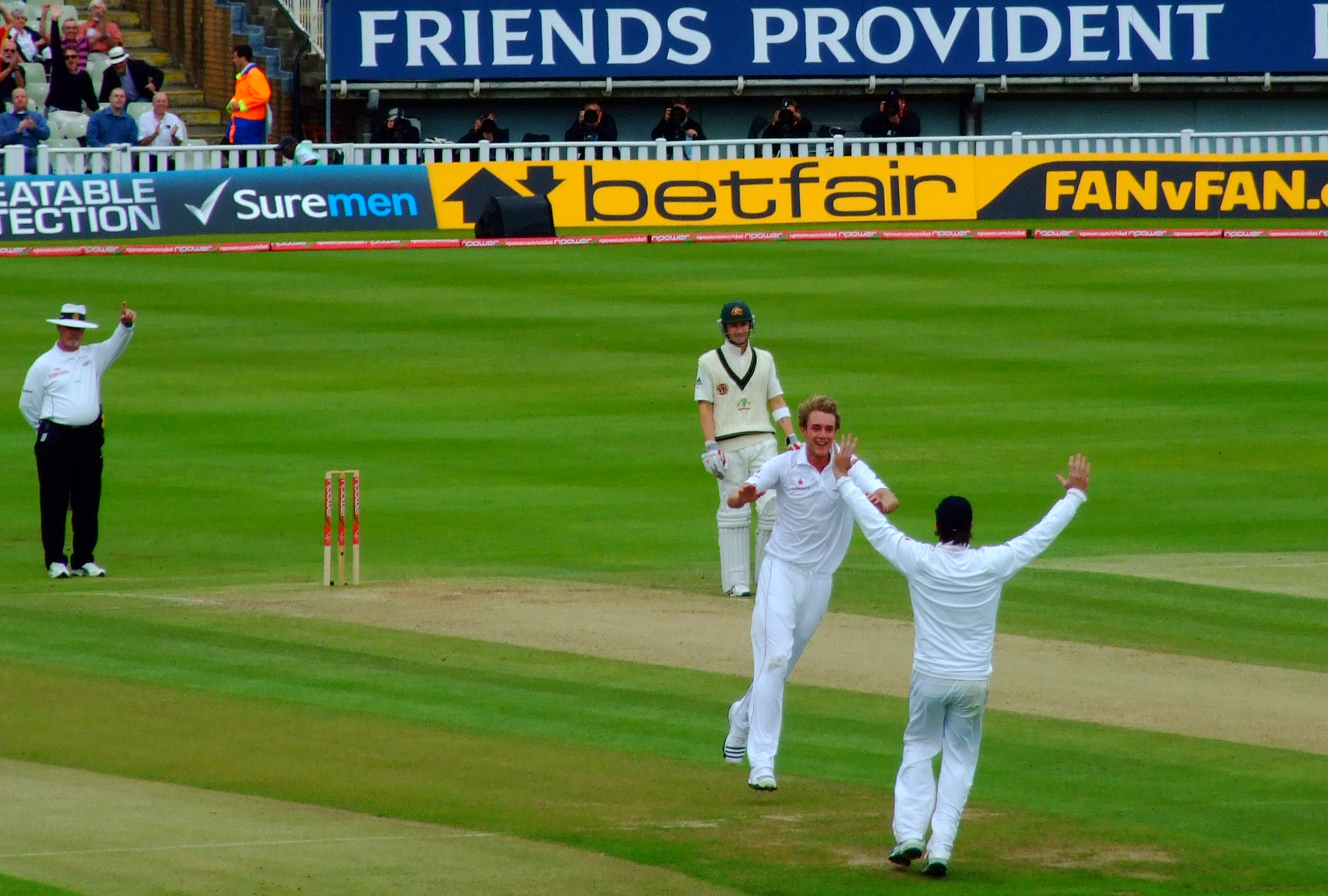
Broad celebrates the wicket of Michael Hussey with Graeme Swann in the 3rd Test of the 2009 Ashes Series

On 26 May 2009, Broad was named Man of the Series (one-day) against the West Indies in England. He took a total of six wickets, and England won the series two-nil after the first ODI was rained out. In the adjacent Test series, in which the home side fairly routed its opponents, Broad's wickets came at an average of just eighteen – "further evidence," reckoned journalist Nick Hoult, "of the top class international cricketer that lurks within. His bowling, particularly the variety he has added to his game, makes him a potential Ashes star [...]."

On 5 June 2009, Netherlands defeated England by four wickets in the first match of the ICC World Twenty20. The Netherlands needed seven to win from the final over with Broad bowling. He spurned two run-out opportunities from the first two balls, and dropped a catch off the third. The Dutch needed two runs from the final ball to win, and got them after Broad picked up the ball in his follow through and, attempting to win the match, overthrew, missing his third run-out opportunity of the over and allowing the batsmen to come back for the match-clinching second run. in the next match against Pakistan, he took 3–17 to help England win by 48 runs. England also beat India by 3 runs. Although Broad failed to take a wicket, he bowled his four overs for just 21 runs to help England secure a narrow victory. England lost their final game of the tournament against the West Indies, with Broad taking 1–20.

In July 2009, Broad was named in The Ashes squad to face Australia for the first Test at the SWALEC Stadium, Cardiff – his maiden Ashes Test. He scored a 22-ball 19 in England's first-innings total of 435, but in 32 overs he took just one wicket (that of Michael Clarke, caught behind for 83) as Australia amassed 674 for 6 declared, with four centurions. Nonetheless, his final-day 14 proved crucial, keeping the Australians at bay alongside Paul Collingwood for a minute over an hour before James Anderson and Monty Panesar blocked out the final 11 1/2 overs to salvage an unlikely draw.

The second Test at Lord's saw Broad take three wickets, including the important wicket of Australian skipper Ricky Ponting, bowled off an inside-edged cut for 38 as England pursued victory, and took a diving outfield catch to remove the opener Simon Katich in the first innings, as England took a 1–0 lead in the series.

Though he took no wickets in the first innings of the third Test at Edgbaston, Broad hit a 64-ball 55 to extend England's first-innings lead to 114. On the final day, Broad took two of the three wickets to fall: Mike Hussey for 64 and, late in the day, Marcus North for 96. Nonetheless, Australia drew the match with ease.

In the fourth Test at Headingley, Broad took his place in an England first-innings collapse, clipping Stuart Clark to square leg for 3 as Australia's seam attack bowled England out for 102. As Australia scored 445, Broad took six wickets for 91 in Australia's only innings, at that time his best first-class innings return, and in the second innings contributed a rapid 61 from 48 balls, though he could not avert an innings defeat.

England therefore started the fifth Test at the Oval with the series level at 1–1, with a victory required to secure the Ashes. He took 5 for 37 in the afternoon session of the second day, taking five of the first seven wickets to fall to take the Australian innings from 73/0 to 111/7 and eventually 160 all out. He also contributed 37 and 29 with the bat, and on the final day took the wicket of Shane Watson lbw for 40, the second wicket to fall in consecutive overs to start Australia's collapse, winning the Man of the Match award as England won by 197 runs to regain the Ashes 2–1.

He finished the tour with an aggregate of 234 runs and 18 wickets, leading England's bowling figures both in wickets taken and in bowling average (30.22). Though three Australian bowlers took more wickets, Broad was the only bowler from either side to claim two five-wicket innings hauls during the series.

This was a good tournament for Broad. He was the second highest wicket taker overall throughout the tournament with 10 wickets in 3 matches, only behind Wayne Parnell who took 11 in the same number of matches. In the first match of the tournament against Sri Lanka he took 3–49 in a winning effort. He followed it up with a 3–67 vs South Africa, putting England through to the semi-finals. He then took 4–39 vs New Zealand in a losing effort after England had already been bowled out for 146, with New Zealand making the runs in just 27.1 overs. This was his last game in the tournament with Broad picking up an injury that kept him out of the semi-finals, which England lost to Australia.

=== 2009–10: South Africa, Bangladesh, T20 World Cup, Australia and Pakistan ===
Broad's injuries continued through to the tour of South Africa, keeping him out of the two twenty20 matches, which both ended up being abandoned. The weather affected the 1st One Day International which was probably an advantage for Broad and the England team with Broad being fit for the 3rd ODI, with England winning the second ODI by 7 wickets after Paul Collingwood and Jonathan Trott had a partnership of 162 with Collingwood getting 105.

When Broad returned he instantly made an impact with numerous wickets but turned out to be very expensive. With his first game getting figures of 4–71, England suffered defeat by 112 runs. Broad improved on his economy rate in the 4th ODI with figures of 2–30 from 9.5 overs. This backed up James Anderson who took 5–23. The final game was rained off before a ball was bowled to leave England with a 2–1 victory and only the second team to win a one-day series vs South Africa in South Africa.

Broad struggled in the First test in Centurion with only taking 1–74 in the first innings and 2–54 in the second. His batting was unsuccessful, getting only 17 and a duck. The duck was during a dramatic collapse where England went from 205–4 to 218–9 with Graham Onions batting out the final over to save the test.

In the second test Broad showed good form with the ball with 2–44 in the first innings but then taking 4–43 in the second dismissing Jacques Kallis, AB de Villiers and JP Duminy all within 3 overs. He took the wicket of Mark Boucher the next day to leave Graeme Swann to dismiss the rest of the South African line up. This gave England an innings and 98 run victory. After this test Broad went up to 7th in the ICC Test bowling rankings, the highest in his career. During this tour he declined to play in the IPL with James Anderson on the grounds he wanted to focus on his Test cricket first, and feared injury in the IPL.

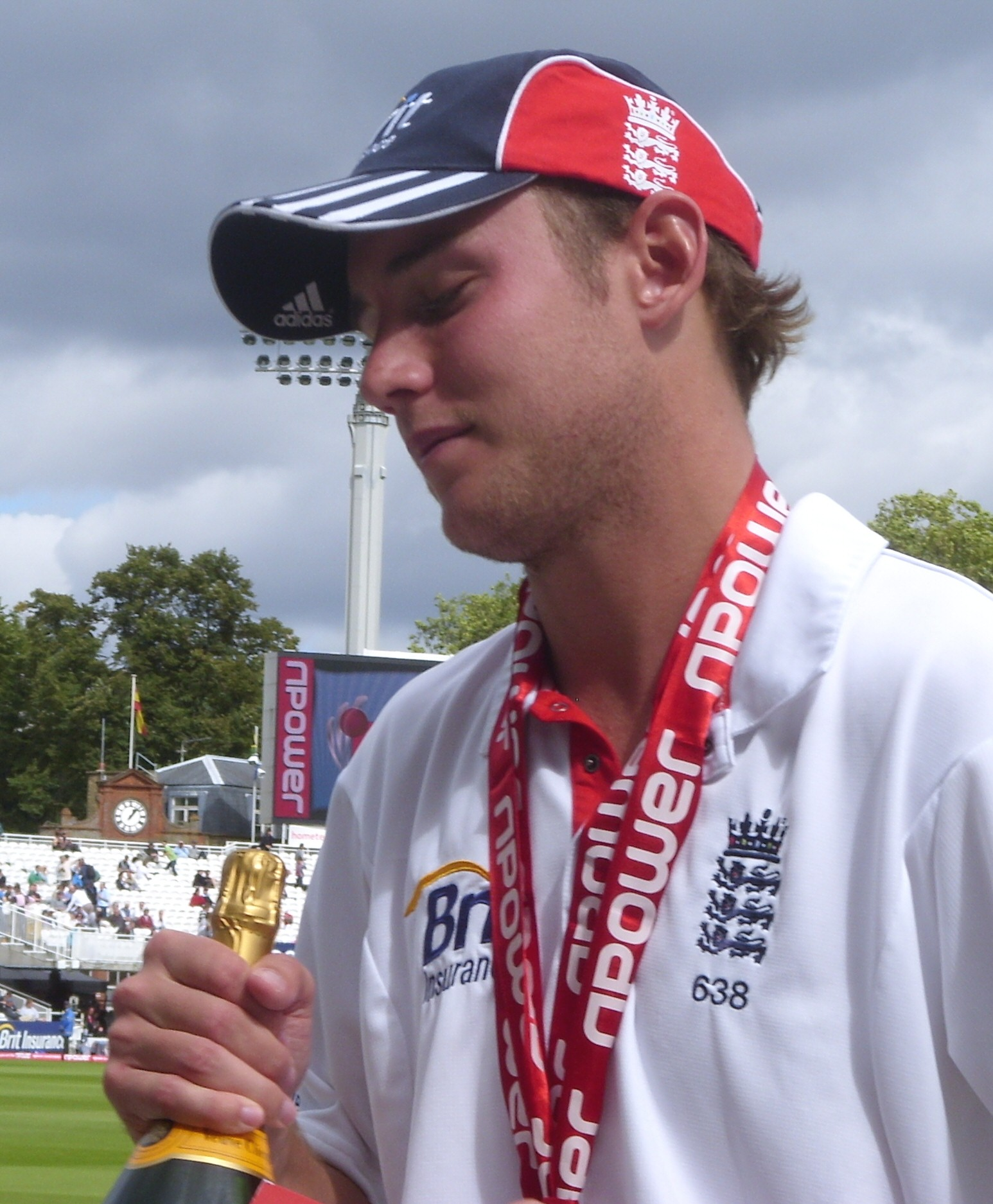
Broad with the Man of the Match award after the Test match against Pakistan at Lord's in 2010

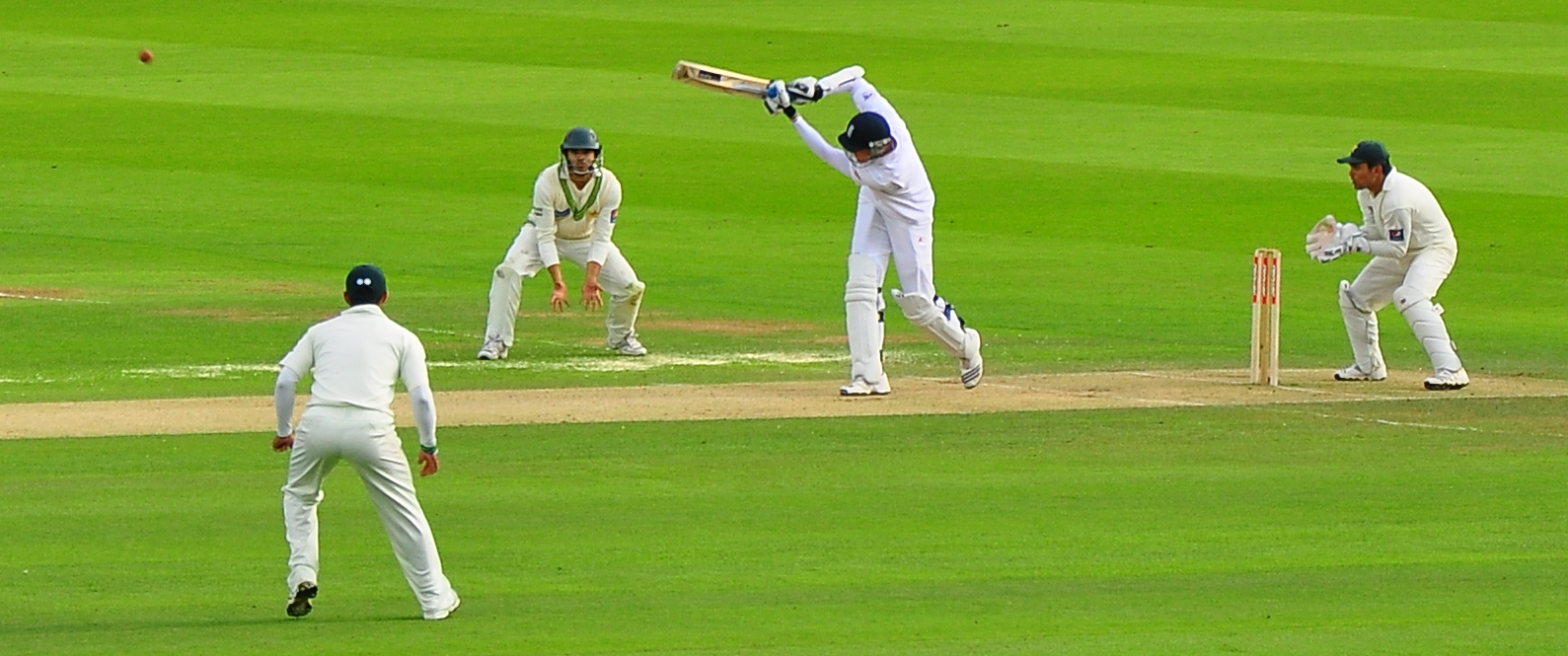
On 27 August 2010, Broad makes a half century

After South Africa, England toured Bangladesh, playing three ODIs and two Test matches. Injuries to Anderson, Onions and Sidebottom meant that Broad was the leader of a relatively inexperienced pace attack. However, an injury before the Test series meant that he wasn't fully fit and was outbowled by Tim Bresnan and debutant Steven Finn.

England then travelled to the West Indies for the 2010 ICC World Twenty20. England won the tournament, beating Australia in the final. Broad won the man of the match award against Sri Lanka in the semi-final, and overall took 8 wickets at an average of 17.50.

Back in England, Broad was rested for the home series against Bangladesh before returning to the side for a 5-match ODI series against Australia. England won the first three games to take the series, with Broad named man of the match in the second game after bowling figures of 4–44. England lost the last two games, though Broad did achieve another four-wicket haul in the fifth game to finish the series with an average of 19.83. The ODIs against Bangladesh were less note-worthy – England won 2–1 with Broad taking 4 wickets.

In the home series against Pakistan, Broad was involved in a disciplinary incident in the second Test. After Pakistani batsman Zulqarnain Haider defended a ball bowled by Broad down the pitch, Broad picked the ball up and threw it at Haider, striking him on the hand. Broad was fined 50% of his match fee.

In the final Test of the series, Broad reached his maiden Test century at Lord's. Coming to the crease at 102–7, he scored 169 and put on a 332-run partnership with fellow centurion Jonathan Trott; a world record for an eighth-wicket partnership. It was his first century in all forms of cricket since an under-19's match for Leicestershire and saw his name go on the Lord's batting honours board, a feat that his father never achieved. He also surpassed his father's Test best of 162, and they became the first father and son both to score centuries for England in Test match cricket. His efforts both with the bat and with the ball (he also took three wickets during the match and made a direct-hit run out) earned him the man of the match award.

=== 2010–11: Ashes series ===
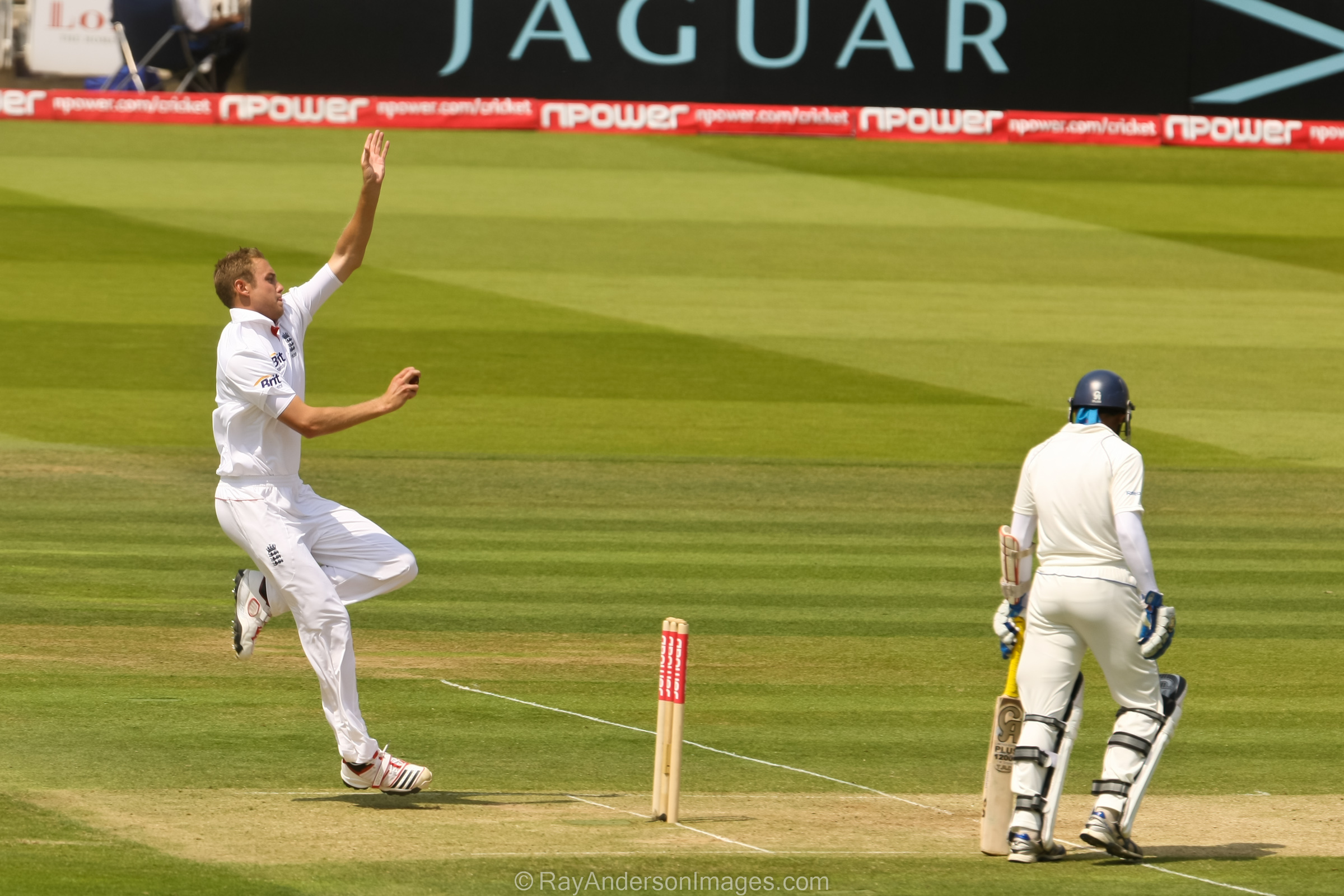
Broad bowling against Sri Lanka at Lord's in June 2011

Broad had an indifferent tour of Australia, which was cut short due to injury. He started with a half-century in a warm-up game, and overall took 6 wickets over the two games against Western Australia and South Australia. In the first Test at the Gabba, Brisbane, he fell for a golden duck in England's innings, the final victim of Peter Siddle's hat-trick. Wicketless in Australia's first innings, he had Simon Katich caught in the second as the Test was drawn. In the second Test at Adelaide, he finished Australia's first innings off with the wicket of Brad Haddin, but a stomach muscle injury limited his participation in the second where England won by an innings. That injury was revealed to be a muscle tear, and it ruled Broad out of the remaining three Tests and the one-day series that followed. He was not missed for the rest of the Test series but he was for the ODIs because England were plagued by injuries throughout the 6–1 series defeat.

=== 2011–12: India, Pakistan and Sri Lanka ===
After a difficult series against Sri Lanka there was much pressure on the England selectors to drop him for the upcoming series against India. However, Broad was named in the side for the first Test at Lord's and ended with match figures of 7–94, as well as scoring an unbeaten 74 in the second innings, as England won by 196 runs. His good form with both bat and ball continued in the second test. Top scoring with an aggressive 64 in the first innings, he helped England recover from 124–8 to 221 all out before achieving his career best figures of 6–46 in India's first innings. This included a hat-trick, taking the wickets of Mahendra Singh Dhoni, Harbhajan Singh and Praveen Kumar. Broad took five wickets from his final 16 balls of the innings, without conceding a single run. With a positive second innings contribution with both bat and ball (44 runs with the bat and then two wickets, including the final wicket of the match) Broad was named Man of the Match. In the Third Test at Edgbaston, Broad took four wickets along with Tim Bresnan to bowl India out cheaply. In England's innings he was not needed as Alistair Cook scored 294 to pass 700. Broad took two wickets in the second innings to beat India and for England to become World number 1 in Test Cricket. Broad made a lesser impact in the fourth Test, taking two wickets in each of India's innings, and did not bat, due to an early declaration.

In the first Test against Pakistan Broad took 3–84 in the first innings. However, England suffered a ten wicket defeat as the batsmen struggled to acclimatise to sub continent conditions. Broad took 4–47 in the next match as well as an unbeaten fifty in England's 1st innings (he'd only score 1 test fifty in 5 years after scoring this 50) but another batting collapse saw England lose the match again (bowled out for 72 chasing 145) to go 2–0 down in the three match series. In the final match Broad took 4–36 in the first innings to help bowl out Pakistan for 99. However, Pakistan made over 300 in their second innings to build up a lead. England were unable to chase down their target and went on to lose the series 3–0. England lost their fourth straight match, this time against Sri Lanka as the batsmen continued to struggle. Broad took just two wickets in the match, although he made 33 runs with the bat in the match, and was not out in the second innings.

=== 2012: West Indies and South Africa ===
Broad started off his summer with his best international innings yet, of 7–72, against the West Indies, at Lord's, the first test match of the series, was started with a bang as he was able to get a five wicket haul at the home of cricket, Lord's, becoming only the 8th player to join an elite club of all-rounders to be on both honours boards, after his maiden test century of 169 against Pakistan in 2010.

He soon followed this up by taking 4 more wickets in the next innings, missing a possible hat trick however, to get Test best figures of 11 for 165, being the first to take a 10 wicket haul at Lord's since Ian Botham in 1978. He had to wait until after Lunch on the 4th day to take the last 3 wickets he needed for the haul. He was named Man of the Match the next day after England won by 5 wickets, in a chase of 191.

Broad followed the performance by taking four wickets in the second test. which England also won. He was rested for the last Test match against the West Indies along with James Anderson. However the game was heavily disrupted by rain and the game ended as a draw. England won the following One Day series 2–0 with the third game being abandoned because of rain. On Broad's 26th birthday, he captained the team to a comfortable victory with Notts teammate Alex Hales scoring 99. He was then named in the squad to play Australia in a five match ODI series. Broad's bowling was overshadowed by Finn who took 11 wickets in four games compared to Broad's 5.

Broad was picked in the first Test against South Africa but failed to take a wicket. He added 16 with the bat in England's first innings of 386. Broad and the England bowlers struggled in South Africa's innings of 637–2 with Hashim Amla scoring a triple century (the first South African to do so) with Jacques Kallis and Graeme Smith also scoring centuries. In the second innings Broad was out for a duck as England lost by an innings and 12 runs. In the second Test, South Africa scored 419 in the first innings with Broad taking 3–96. He then scored 1 run in England's innings of 425. Broad then had a burst of wickets on the last day with the wickets of AB de Villiers and JP Duminy in successive deliveries. He finished with figures of 5–69 as England couldn't reach the target and the game ended in a draw. In the following Test, Broad was pushed up the order to number 8 after Tim Bresnan was left out. Broad only managed one wicket in South Africa's first innings of 309. He then added 16 in England's first innings of 315. Broad, who had been down on pace all summer struggled as he took 2–76 as South Africa set England 346 to win. England lost by 51 runs, Broad adding 37 runs.

=== 2013: New Zealand and Ashes series ===
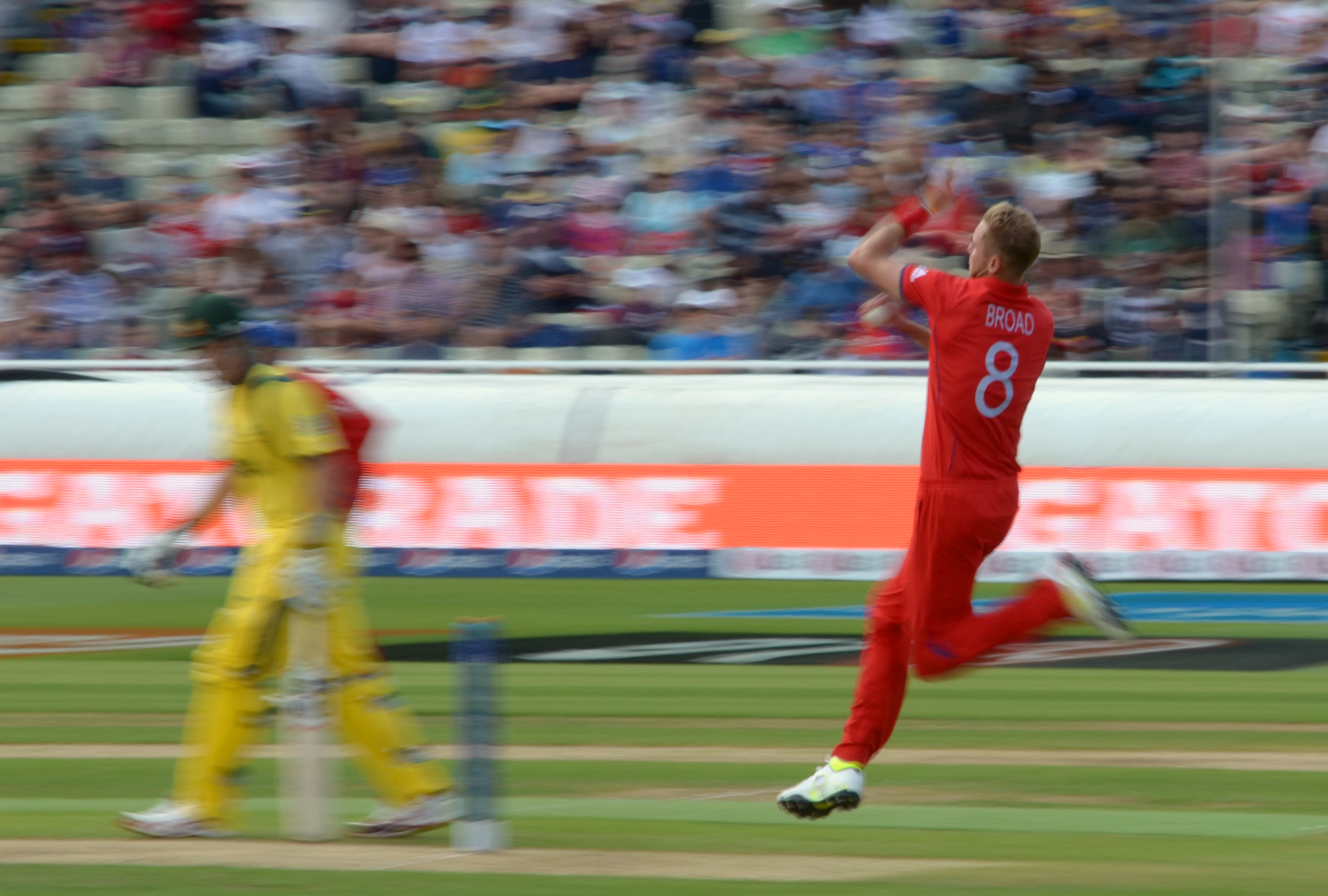
Broad comes in to bowl during the England v Australia game of the 2013 ICC Champions Trophy at Edgbaston

On the fifth day of the 3rd Test against New Zealand, Broad set a new record for the longest time spent at the crease without scoring a run, with 103 minutes out in the middle, facing 62 balls. The previous record was 101 minutes set by New Zealander Geoff Allott against South Africa in 1999.

On 19 May, in the First Test against New Zealand at Lord's, Broad took career best figures of 7/44 in the second innings of the match. In England's second innings, he also contributed 26 runs to their total of 213.

In the first Test of the 2013 Ashes held at Trent Bridge, Broad stood his ground after being given not out when edging an Ashton Agar delivery which deflected off wicket-keeper Brad Haddin's gloves and was caught by Australia captain Michael Clarke at first slip; the Umpire Decision Review System was in use during the series, but Australia had used all of its challenges when the incident occurred. Although neither the rules nor common practice required Broad to walk, he drew heavy criticism from many observers who thought his edge was too thick to have reasonably stood his ground. Broad was on 37 at the time of the incident and went to make 65, sharing a partnership of 138 with Ian Bell. England went on to win the match by 14 runs with Broad taking the wickets of Shane Watson and Clarke in Australia's second innings. Australia coach Darren Lehmann was later fined 20% of his match fee for calling Broad a cheat on Australian radio, and in doing so inciting Australian crowds to boo Broad in future English tours of Australia.

On 2 August 2013, Broad took his 200th Test wicket, bowling Clarke in the first innings of the drawn third Ashes Test at Old Trafford.

In the fourth Test, at the Riverside Ground in Chester-le-Street, Broad took eleven wickets with two five-wicket hauls and was named man of the match as England ensured a series win. In the first innings, he took 5–71, including a spell of 3–12 in the morning session of day 2 where he removed David Warner, Usman Khawaja and Clarke to reduce Australia to 49–3. In their second innings, chasing 299 to win, Australia had made 174–3 when Broad took the wicket Clarke for the fifth time in the series, with the first delivery after a drinks break. In this spell he took 6–20 from 45 balls, including the final Australian wicket, to bowl Australia out for 224 and win the match by 74 runs. Broad ended the match with his best test bowling match figures of 11–121.

=== 2013–14: Ashes series ===
Broad was England's leading wicket taker in the first Test of the 2013–14 Ashes series at the Gabba in Brisbane, taking 6–81 in the first innings and ending with match figures of 8–136, in the match that England lost in four days by 381 runs. In the second Test Broad took 3–98 in Australia's first innings, but as England struggled he only bowled six overs in the second innings as Australia romped to victory. Broad took 3–100 in the third Test but was then injured by a delivery from Mitchell Johnson, which dismissed him for just 5. The injury prevented him from bowling in the second innings, as England went on to lose the game and the series. Broad was declared fit for the fourth Test and took 3–45 in the Australian first innings, but struggled in the second, bowling 10 wicketless overs for 58 runs. In the final Test, Broad batted well, making an unbeaten 30 in the first innings and then 42 in the second. England went on to lose the game and the series 5–0, leading to the England team being heavily criticised. Despite this, Broad was one of the few members of the team to come out of the series with any credibility.

=== 2014: West Indies, T20 World Cup, Sri Lanka and India ===
Broad continued as captain for the tour of the West Indies. This included three ODIs and three T20Is. In the ODI series England won 2–1, with Broad bringing England home in the 2nd game with a knock of 28 not out. In the third game he took 2–58 as England won by 25 runs. He only played in the first T20I, as England lost by 27 runs, taking figures of 0–26.

Broad was named captain of the England cricket team for the 2014 ICC World Twenty20 in Bangladesh. He did not take a wicket in the first two games, as England lost to New Zealand and beat Sri Lanka. In the third game, against South Africa, Broad took 1–33 but England lost the match to end their hopes of qualifying for the next stage. He took 3–24 against the Netherlands, but he was unable to prevent an embarrassing defeat for England.

In the first Test of the series against Sri Lanka, Broad took one wicket in the first innings and three in the second, as England came close to winning the match. In the second Test at Headingley, he became only the fourth player, and the first Englishman, to take two Test hat-tricks, although he needed to be informed of this by the PA system as he was unaware. England went on to lose the game after James Anderson was dismissed off the penultimate ball of the match, meaning England lost the series 1–0.

Broad bowled well on a good batting pitch in the first game of the series against India, taking four wickets in the match. However, in the second game he was accused of bowling badly in the first innings, as India won the match to go 1–0 up in the series. Broad's form improved in the next game, as he took 3–66 in the first innings to help England win the game and level the series. He took figures of 6–25 in India's first innings of the next game to help dismiss them for 152. Broad was badly injured while batting and it was later revealed he had broken his nose. Broad was later named man of the match. Despite being an injury doubt, he took part in the final Test, taking 3 wickets in the match and scoring 37 to help England secure a 3–1 series win.

=== 2015: Tri-Series, World Cup, West Indies and New Zealand ===
Following an injury which had kept him out of the one-day tour of Sri Lanka, Broad returned for the Tri-Series against Australia and India. In the first match of the series he was wicket less as England lost to Australia. In the next match against India, Broad finished with figures of 0–33. His worst performance of the series came in the following match against Australia, where he finished with figures of 0–61. However, he played well in the must win game against India, taking figures of 2–56 to help England qualify for the final. In the final match against Australia he took figures of 3–55 and made 24 with the bat, but it was not enough to prevent an England defeat as they went on to finish the tournament as runners-up.

Broad took figures of 2–66 in England's opening game loss to Australia. In the following game against New Zealand, he was unimpressive as England suffered a humiliating eight wicket defeat. He failed to take a wicket against Scotland as England won their first match of the tournament, and also finished wicket less as England suffered a nine wicket defeat against Sri Lanka, meaning he had failed to take a wicket in his past three matches. He finished with 1–52 in England's must win game against Bangladesh, but was dismissed for 9 as England lost the game to bow out of the tournament at the group stage. He finished with figures of 1–18 against Afghanistan in a rain affected as England won their final match of the tournament by nine wickets.

The first match against the West Indies, Broad took 2–67 in their first innings to help restrict them to 295. However, in the second innings he could only manage to take one wicket as the West Indies held on for a draw. In the second Test ok 4–61 in West Indies first innings to help out England in a strong position. He took another wicket in the second innings as England forced a result to go 1–0 up in the series. In the first Test Broad took 1–31 in West Indies first innings to help England into a lead. However, England collapsed in their second innings and Broad himself was out for a duck. He took 1–29 in the West Indies second innings but it wasn't enough to prevent a five wicket defeat as the West Indies levelled the series at 1–1.

In the two match series against New Zealand, Broad took 3–77 in New Zealand's first innings. With New Zealand chasing a big score to win the match, Broad took 3–50 in New Zealand's second innings to help England win by 124 runs and go 1–0 up in the series. Broad took 5–109 in New Zealand's first innings of the next Test, although he went at an economy rate of over six an over. He made 46 with the bat to help England level the scores after the first innings. He took 2–94 in the second innings but was again expensive, and New Zealand went on to win the match and tie the series 1–1.

=== 2015: Ashes series ===
In Australia's first innings of the first Test, Broad took figures of 2–60 and followed this up by taking 3–39 in their second innings as England won the match to take the lead in the series. Broad took 4–83 in Australia's first innings of the second Test but they built a large first innings score of 566. Broad did not take a wicket in the Australians second innings as they won by 405 runs. In the third Test Broad took 2–44 in Australia's first innings and also took a wicket in their second as England won the game to regain the lead. Broad's best ever bowling performance was on the first morning of his home Test at Trent Bridge. In the fourth Test, Broad took career best figures of 8–15 in the Australian first innings as they were dismissed for just 60. This was the second best Ashes bowling performance of all time after Laker's 19 wickets in 1956 at Old Trafford, and the fastest 5-wicket haul ever in all Tests, as Broad passed 300 wickets. England went on to win the match convincingly and regain the Ashes. In the final Test Broad did not take a wicket as Australia won by an innings and 48 runs, although England won the series 3–2.

=== 2015–16: Pakistan and South Africa ===
Broad played in the first Test against Pakistan, which was played in the UAE. While Broad only took one wicket in the match, he bowled economically, including bowling eight overs for just eight runs in the second innings. England came to close to forcing a result, but the match ended in a draw. In the second Test Broad again only managed to take one wicket as Pakistan enjoyed a convincing win to go 1–0 up in the three-match series. In the third Test, Broad continued to bowl economically, taking figures of 2–13 from 13 overs in Pakistan's first innings, as they were dismissed for 234. In the second innings, he took 3–44 but England struggled in their second innings and Pakistan went on to win the game to win the series 2–0.

In the first test in South Africa, Broad took figures of 4–25 and 1–29 and hit an unbeaten 32 from just 33 balls as England won by 241 runs. The second game ended in a high scoring draw, with Broad taking 2–94 in South Africa's first innings. In the third Test, Broad took 2–82 in South Africa's first innings in a game which looked to be finely poised. However, in South Africa's second innings, he ripped through their top order, finishing with figures of 6–17. Included in his six wickets were the prized wickets of AB de Villiers and Hashim Amla. England went on to win the game by seven wickets, with the result giving them an unassailable 2–0 series lead. England performed poorly in the final game, with Broad taking three wickets in the match as South Africa secured a victory by a margin of 280 runs, meaning the series finished 2–1 to England. As a result of his performances, Broad became the number one ranked Test bowler in the world.

After not playing for England in limited overs cricket since their poor showing at the 2015 World Cup, Broad was included in the squad for the ODI series against South Africa. He played in the fourth ODI, although he returned expensive figures, finishing up with 1–55 in seven overs, as England lost the game. He was selected in the side for the final game, which proved to be the decider, and although he bowled economically, he did not pick up a wicket and England went on to lose the game and the series 3–2.

=== 2016: Sri Lanka, Pakistan, Bangladesh and India ===
Broad took figures of 4–21 in Sri Lanka's first innings of the first Test as they were dismissed for just 91. In the second innings he took 1–57 as England won by an innings and 88 runs. In the second match, Broad took 4–40 in Sri Lanka's first innings, but was less effective in their second, finishing with just one wicket, as England won the match by nine wickets. In the final rain affected match of the series, Broad took 2–79 as Sri Lanka were dismissed for 288, but the match ended in a draw due to the bad weather.

Broad took figures of 3–71 in Pakistan's first innings of the first Test, and took 3–38 in their second innings, although Pakistan did enough to secure a 75 run victory. In the second Test Broad took 1–20 in Pakistan's first innings as they were dismissed for 198 and England secured a 330 run victory. In the third Test, Broad took 3–83 in Pakistan's first innings as they reached 400, and then took 2–24 in their second innings to help England secure an unlikely victory after dismissing them for 201. In the final match of the series, Broad was less effective, taking just one wicket in the match, as England lost by 10 wickets.

In the first innings of the first Test against Bangladesh, Broad did not take a wicket in the first innings, although he bowled economically. In the second innings he took figures of 2–31 to help England win by 21 runs. He was rested for the second Test, which England lost

Broad played his 100th Test in the first match against India, taking figures of 1–78 in the first innings, before taking 0–8 in the second innings as the match ended in a draw. In the second Test he took 1–49 as India made 455 in their first innings. He took 4–33 in the second innings to restrict India to 204 runs, although India won the match by 246 runs. Broad missed the next two Tests through injury, but returned in the fifth Test. He took figures of 2–80 as India scored 759/7 and went on to win the match by an inning and 75 runs to win the series 4–0.

=== 2018 and beyond ===
On 22 March 2018, In the first Test against New Zealand, Broad took his 400th wicket in Tests and became the youngest fast bowler to do so.

In the first Test of the 2019 Ashes series, Broad took his 100th wicket in The Ashes in the first innings of the match. In the second innings of the match, he took his 450th wicket in Test cricket, dismissing David Warner.

On 29 May 2020, Broad was named in a 55-man group of players to begin training ahead of international fixtures starting in England following the COVID-19 pandemic. On 17 June 2020, Broad was included in England's 30-man squad to start training behind closed doors for the Test series against the West Indies. On 4 July 2020, Broad was named in England's thirteen-man squad for the first Test match of the series. Broad was not selected for the first test, a match that England subsequently lost, and publicly vented his frustration. Broad took six wickets after being recalled for the second match of the series, an England win. On 28 July 2020, Broad took his 500th wicket in Test cricket, dismissing Kraigg Brathwaite (who was also James Anderson's 500th wicket) along with scoring 62 runs and taking 10 wickets in the match including the final wicket, to win the final Wisden Trophy 2–1. For his efforts Broad was named man of the match and man of the series.

Following his dismissal for 0 by Trent Boult in the second test against New Zealand in June 2021, Broad moved to second in the all-time list of test match ducks (37), second only to the West Indian fast bowler Courtney Walsh (43).

In the fifth Test of the 2022 India tour of England at Edgbaston, Broad conceded 35 runs in an over, the most in Test cricket history.

=== 2023 Ashes and retirement ===
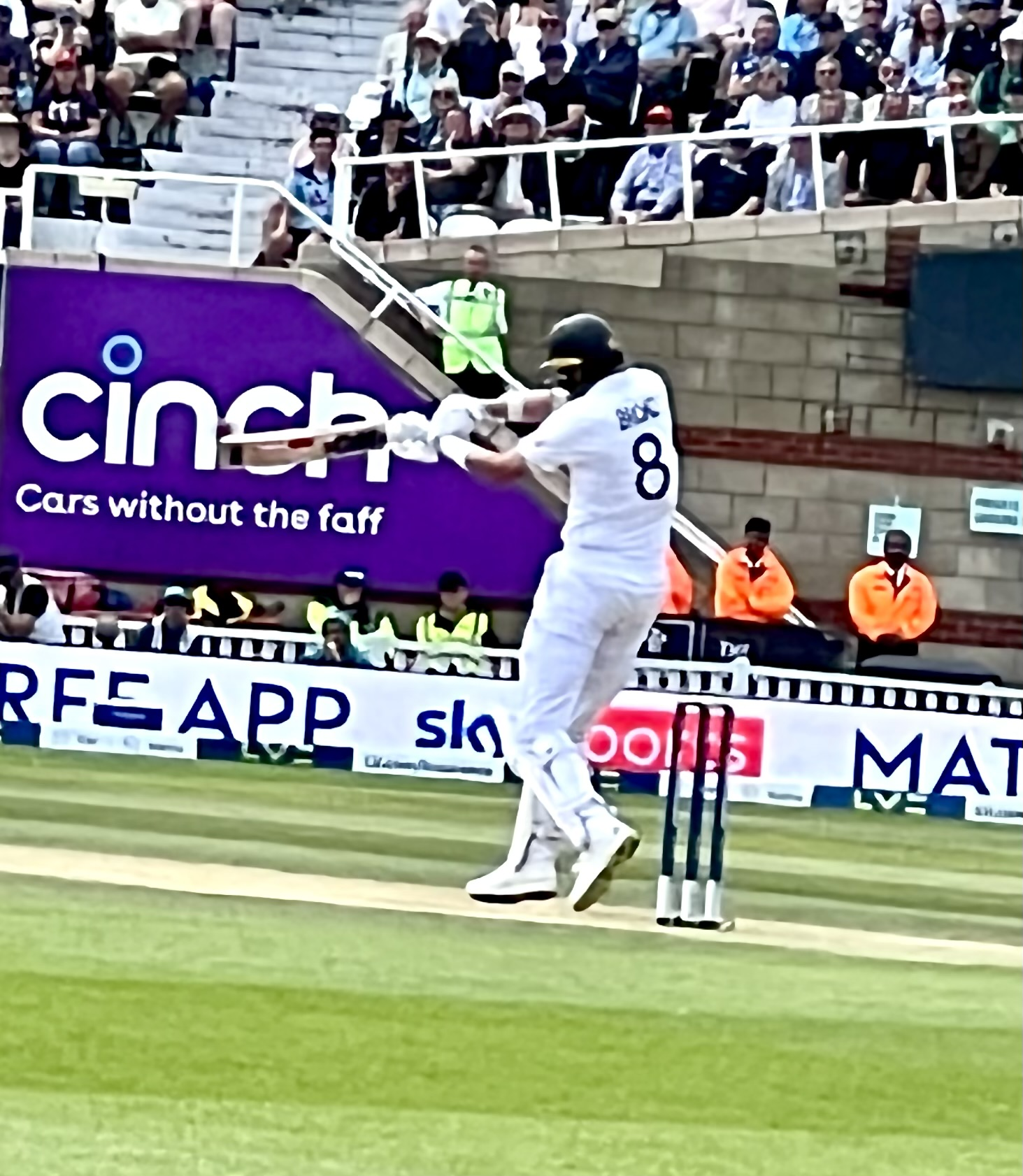
Broad hits the final ball he receives in Test cricket for six

In the fourth Test of the 2023 Ashes series, Broad reached the 600 wicket milestone after dismissing Travis Head in the first innings. At the end of the third day of the fifth Test during the 2023 Ashes, Broad announced his retirement from all formats and all levels of cricket following the conclusion of the series.

In June 2025, Broad was recruited by the South African cricket team to lend his expertise ahead of the World Test Championship Final against Australia, drawing on his long-standing performance in Ashes contests to provide strategic insight. His engagement marked one of his first high-profile roles following his retirement from all forms of cricket in July 2023.

== Honours and achievements ==
Broad was appointed Member of the Order of the British Empire (MBE) in the 2016 Birthday Honours and Commander of the Order of the British Empire (CBE) in the 2024 New Year Honours, both for services to cricket.

- On 17 September 2015, NET tram 237 was named in honour of Broad, Class 701 Unit 701031 Was Named "Nighthawk" by Broad On 28 November 2024
- At the conclusion of the 5th Test in India's tour of the United Kingdom in 2018, Broad and Anderson had tallied 850 wickets playing together across 111 Tests, third all-time on the list of bowling pairs in Tests, behind only Glenn McGrath and Shane Warne (1,001 wickets in 104 Tests together) and Chaminda Vaas and Muttiah Muralitharan (895 wickets in 95 Tests together). They have subsequently gone on to pass Warne and McGrath as the top bowling pair, as of February 2023, with a combined 1,009 wickets in 133 Tests played together.
- On the morning of the fifth and final day of the third Test of the 2020 series against the West Indies, Broad became the seventh bowler to take 500 wickets in Test cricket, after dismissing Kraigg Brathwaite. Broad was the fourth fast bowler, and second bowler for England to reach the milesteone after James Anderson, who achieved it against the same batsman.
- Broad has dismissed David Warner 17 times. This is one of the most instances a bowler has dismissed the same batsman in Test cricket.
- Broad hit the final ball he faced in Test cricket for 6 and took a wicket with the final ball he bowled in Test cricket, a double feat unique to him.
- In December 2023, Broad achieved the runner-up spot in the BBC Sports Personality of the Year for 2023.
- ICC Men's Test Team of the Year: 2009, 2011, 2012, 2014, 2015, 2023

== Personal life ==
Broad's father, Chris Broad, played Test cricket for England from 1984 to 1989, and his sister Gemma worked for the England team as a team analyst. His stepmother Michelle "Miche" Broad died by suicide in July 2010. She had been suffering with motor neurone disease prior to her death.

Broad supports Nottingham Forest F.C. and Leicester Tigers. During the 2017–18 Premier League season, Broad won Manager of the Week in Round 37 in the official fantasy game.

Broad is in a relationship with The Saturdays singer and BBC Radio 1 presenter Mollie King, and they became engaged in January 2021. The pair reside in London, and announced in June 2022 that they were expecting their first child. In November 2022, King gave birth to their first child, a daughter. Their second daughter was born in January 2025.

Broad is co-owner of a former country hotel near Melton Mowbray on the Nottinghamshire and Leicestershire border, along with Harry Gurney. Named 'Tap and Run', in June 2022 it suffered total loss through fire caused by electrical drying of hotel linen overnight, leaving only the shell. Following a full rebuild costing £1.3 million, it reopened in 2023 as a 'Pub and Kitchen' and was described by the owners as their "second innings".

Stuart Broad released his autobiography Broadly Speaking in November 2023.

On 28 November 2024, Broad named a South Western Railway Arterio train Nighthawk.
