= Ray Swann =

English former cricketer

Raymond Swann
Personal information
- Full name: Raymond Swann
- Born: 2 October 1950 (age 76); Stannington, Northumberland, England
- Batting: Right-handed
- Bowling: Right-arm medium
- Relatives: Alec Swann (son); Graeme Swann (son)

Domestic team information
- Years: Team
- 1969–1972: Northumberland
- 1989–1995: Bedfordshire
- 1999: Northamptonshire Cricket Board

Career statistics
Competition	List A
Matches	3
Runs scored	37
Batting average	12.33
100s/50s	0/0
Top score	19
Balls bowled	54
Wickets	2
Bowling average	31.00
5 wickets in innings	0
10 wickets in match	0
Best bowling	2/50
Catches/stumpings	0/–
- Source: Cricinfo, 22 July 2010

Raymond Swann (born 2 October 1950) is a former English cricketer and schoolteacher. Swann was a right-handed batsman who bowled right-arm medium pace. He was born at Stannington, Northumberland.

Swann made his debut in county cricket for Northumberland, in the 1969 Minor Counties Championship against Cheshire. From 1969 to 1972, he represented the county in seventeen Minor Counties matches, with his final appearance coming against Durham. In 1971, he also represented the county in a List A match against Lincolnshire in the Gillette Cup.

Seventeen years after his last Minor counties appearance, Swann joined Bedfordshire, making his Minor Counties Championship debut for the county against his former county Northumberland. From 1989 to 1995, he represented the county in 53 Minor Counties Championship matches, with his final appearance coming against Cambridgeshire. He also represented the county in twelve MCCA Knockout Trophy matches. He also played a single List A match for Bedfordshire against Worcestershire in the 1991 NatWest Trophy.

Swann's final List A appearance came in the 1999 NatWest Trophy for the Northamptonshire Cricket Board against Wiltshire. In his total of three List A matches, he scored 37 runs at an average of 12.33, with a high score of 19. With the ball, he took 2 wickets at a bowling average of 31.00, with best figures of 2/50.

== Family and personal life ==
Swann has two cricketing sons. His younger son Graeme represented Bedfordshire, Northamptonshire, Nottinghamshire and England and was a Wisden Cricketer of the Year in 2010. His elder son Alec has also represented Bedfordshire and played first-class cricket for Northamptonshire and Lancashire. He previously taught P.E. and mathematics at Sponne School, Towcester and Lings Upper school Northampton. He then taught mathematics and geography at Akeley Wood School.
