= Pakistani cricket team in England in 2010 =

International cricket tour

Pakistan cricket team in England in 2010
	Pakistan	England
- Dates: 29 July – 22 September 2010
Captains	Salman Butt (Tests); Shahid Afridi (ODIs & T20Is)	Andrew Strauss (Tests and ODIs); Paul Collingwood (T20Is)

Test series
- Result: England won the 4-match series 3–1
Most runs	Umar Akmal (184)	Jonathan Trott (404)
Most wickets	Mohammad Amir (19)	James Anderson (23)
- Player of the series: Mohammad Amir (Pak), Jonathan Trott (Eng)

One Day International series
- Results: England won the 5-match series 3–2
Most runs	Kamran Akmal (201)	Andrew Strauss (317)
Most wickets	Umar Gul (12)	Graeme Swann (11); Stuart Broad (11)
- Player of the series: Andrew Strauss (Eng)

Twenty20 International series
- Results: England won the 2-match series 2–0
Most runs	Umar Akmal (52)	Eoin Morgan (56)
Most wickets	Shoaib Akhtar (3); Shahid Afridi (3)	Tim Bresnan (4); Graeme Swann (4)

The Pakistan cricket team toured England from 29 July to 22 September 2010. The tour consisted of four Tests, two Twenty20s (T20) and five One Day Internationals (ODIs).

The series became infamous for the Pakistan cricket spot-fixing scandal during the Fourth Test match at Lord's.

The first Test of the series, at Trent Bridge, was the 900th Test match to be played by England.

== Test series ==
=== First Test ===
29 July – 2 August
Scorecard

England	v	Pakistan
354 (104.1 overs); Eoin Morgan 130 (216); Mohammad Asif 5/77 (27 overs)		182 (54 overs); Umar Gul 65* (46); James Anderson 5/54 (22 overs)
262/9d (75.3 overs); Matt Prior 102* (136); Umar Gul 3/41 (15 overs)		80 (29 overs); Danish Kaneria 16* (21); James Anderson 6/17 (15 overs)

England won by 354 runs
Trent Bridge, Nottingham
Umpires: Asoka De Silva (SL) and Tony Hill (NZ)
Player of the match: James Anderson (Eng)

- England won the toss and elected to bat.
- Play on Day 2 was reduced due to bad light.
- Eoin Morgan (Eng) scored his maiden Test century.

=== Second Test ===
6–10 August
Scorecard

Pakistan	v	England
72 (39.3 overs); Umar Amin 23 (47); James Anderson 4/20 (14.3 overs)		251 (83.1 overs); Kevin Pietersen 80 (147); Saeed Ajmal 5/82 (26.1 overs)
296 (117.5 overs); Zulqarnain Haider 88 (200); Graeme Swann 6/65 (37 overs)		118/1 (36.3 overs); Jonathan Trott 53* (101); Mohammad Amir 1/31 (11 overs)

England won by 9 wickets
Edgbaston Cricket Ground, Birmingham
Umpires: Steve Davis (Aus) and Marais Erasmus (SA)
Player of the match: Graeme Swann (Eng)

- Pakistan won the toss and elected to bat.
- Play on Day 1 was reduced due to bad light.
- Play on Day 2 was delayed by rain and reduced due to bad light.

=== Third Test ===
18–22 August
Scorecard

England	v	Pakistan
233 (62.3 overs); Matt Prior 84* (127); Wahab Riaz 5/63 (18 overs)		308 (100.2 overs); Azhar Ali 92* (176); Graeme Swann 4/68 (27.2 overs)
222 (77 overs); Alastair Cook 110 (173); Mohammad Amir 5/52 (19 overs)		148/6 (41.4 overs); Salman Butt 48 (64); Graeme Swann 3/50 (18.4 overs)

Pakistan won by 4 wickets
The Oval, London
Umpires: Steve Davis (Aus) and Tony Hill (NZ)
Player of the match: Mohammad Amir (Pak)

- England won the toss and elected to bat.
- Play on day 3 was reduced due to bad light.
- Wahab Riaz (Pak) made his Test debut.

=== Fourth Test ===
26–30 August
Scorecard

England	v	Pakistan
446 (139.2 overs); Jonathan Trott 184 (383); Mohammad Amir 6/84 (28 overs)		74 (33 overs); Salman Butt 26 (58); Graeme Swann 4/12 (8 overs)
		147 (36.5 overs) (f/o); Umar Akmal 79* (68); Graeme Swann 5/62 (13.5 overs)

England won by an innings and 225 runs
Lord's, London
Umpires: Billy Bowden (NZ) and Tony Hill (NZ)
Player of the match: Stuart Broad (Eng)

- Pakistan won the toss and elected to field.
- Play on Day 1 was reduced due to rain and bad light.
- Play on Day 3 was reduced due to rain.

After being put into bat by Pakistan, England were reduced to 102 for 7 on the second day. Jonathan Trott and Stuart Broad then put on a world record score for the eighth wicket with a partnership of 332.

==== Betting allegations ====
On the third day of the 4th Test, British newspaper News of the World published a story with allegations that an agent loosely affiliated with some of the Pakistani players (later identified as Mazhar Majeed) had accepted a £150,000 (US$232,665) bribe from undercover reporters for information that two Pakistani bowlers (Mohammad Asif and Mohammad Amir) would deliberately deliver no-balls at specific points during the match, information which could be used by gamblers to make wagers with inside information (a process known as spot-fixing, compared with match fixing to predetermine a match result).

In the video posted by News of the World, Majeed, counting out the bribe money, predicted that Amir would be Pakistan's bowler for the third over, and that the first ball of that over would be a no-ball delivery. Amir did bowl the third over, and on his first delivery from the over, bowled a no-ball delivery. Commentary described the delivery as a "massive overstep", a good half-metre beyond the popping crease following the television replay of the delivery. Majeed also predicted that the sixth delivery of the tenth over would be a no-ball, and the ball, delivered by Asif, was also a no-ball delivery.

As a result of the allegations and video posted by News of the World, Scotland Yard announced during the evening that they had arrested Majeed on charges of suspicion of conspiracy to defraud bookmakers. Two days later, after the Test match had completed, three more arrests were made (two unidentified men and an unidentified woman) on money laundering charges in connection with the allegations. Police also seized the cell phones of Asif, Amir, and Salman Butt as part of their investigations.

Yawar Saeed, the Pakistan team manager insisted after the conclusion of the test series that the T20 series and the ODI series will be played. He also refused to say that Butt should resign as Test captain.

On 1 November 2011, Asif, Amir and Butt were found guilty for their part in the spot-fixing and were given prison sentences, ranging from six months to 30 months.

== Twenty20 series ==
Following the betting allegations, Mohammad Asif, Mohammad Amir and Salman Butt were eventually dropped from the Twenty20 and One day squads at the players' request. They had not been suspended, and three players would be called up to replace them. This followed several days where the PCB refused to drop or suspend the players from the rest of the tour, even after England requested that the trio sit out the rest of the tour.

On 2 September 2010, after the warm-up List A game between Pakistan and Somerset, the International Cricket Council announced that they had suspended Asif, Amir and Butt under the provision of the ICC's Anti-Corruption Code. The statement from the ICC stated that the three players were charged "under various offenses under Article 2 of the ICC Anti-Corruption Code for Players and Player Support Personnel relating to alleged irregular behavior during, and in relation to, the fourth Test between England and Pakistan at Lord's last month".

=== 1st T20I ===
5 September
Scorecard

Pakistan; 126/4 (20 overs)	v	England; 129/5 (17.1 overs)
Umar Akmal 35* (30); Graeme Swann 2/14 (4 overs)		Eoin Morgan 38* (24); Shoaib Akhtar 2/23 (4 overs)

England won by 5 wickets
Sophia Gardens, Cardiff
Umpires: Richard Kettleborough (Eng) and Nigel Llong (Eng)
Player of the match: Michael Yardy (Eng)

- England won the toss and elected to field.

=== 2nd T20I ===
7 September
Scorecard

Pakistan; 89 (18.4 overs)	v	England; 90/4 (14 overs)
Umar Akmal 17 (13); Tim Bresnan 3/10 (3.4 overs)		Paul Collingwood 21 (25); Saeed Ajmal 1/13 (3 overs)

England won by 6 wickets
Sophia Gardens, Cardiff
Umpires: Ian Gould (Eng) and Richard Illingworth (Eng)
Player of the match: Tim Bresnan (Eng)

- Pakistan won the toss and elected to bat.

== ODI series ==
=== 1st ODI ===
10 September
Scorecard

England; 274/6 (41 overs)	v	Pakistan; 250/9 (41 overs)
Steven Davies 87 (67); Saeed Ajmal 4/58 (9 overs)		Kamran Akmal 53 (61); James Anderson 2/35 (9 overs)

England won by 24 runs
Riverside Ground, Chester-le-Street
Umpires: Billy Doctrove (WI) and Ian Gould (Eng)
Player of the match: Steven Davies (Eng)

- Pakistan won the toss and elected to field.
- Wet ground reduced play to 41 overs each.
- Mohammad Irfan (Pak) made his ODI debut.

=== 2nd ODI ===
12 September
Scorecard

Pakistan; 294/8 (50 overs)	v	England; 295/6 (49.3 overs)
Kamran Akmal 74 (72); Stuart Broad 4/81 (10 overs)		Andrew Strauss 126 (134); Saeed Ajmal 2/52 (10 overs)

England won by 4 wickets
Headingley, Leeds
Umpires: Billy Doctrove (WI) and Nigel Llong (Eng)
Player of the match: Andrew Strauss (Eng)

- Pakistan won the toss and elected to bat.

=== 3rd ODI ===
17 September
Scorecard

Pakistan; 241 (49.4 overs)	v	England; 218 (45.4 overs)
Fawad Alam 64 (86); James Anderson 3/26 (10 overs)		Eoin Morgan 61 (74); Umar Gul 6/42 (10 overs)

Pakistan won by 23 runs
The Oval, London
Umpires: Billy Doctrove (WI) and Richard Illingworth (Eng)
Player of the match: Umar Gul (Pak)

- Pakistan won the toss and elected to bat.

=== 4th ODI ===
20 September
Scorecard

Pakistan; 265/7 (50 overs)	v	England; 227 (46.1 overs)
Mohammad Hafeez 64 (100); Graeme Swann 4/37 (10 overs)		Andrew Strauss 68 (72); Umar Gul 4/32 (8.1 overs)

Pakistan won by 38 runs
Lord's, London
Umpires: Billy Doctrove (WI) and Richard Kettleborough (Eng)
Player of the match: Abdul Razzaq (Pak)

- Pakistan won the toss and elected to bat.

=== 5th ODI ===
22 September
Scorecard

England; 256/6 (50 overs)	v	Pakistan; 135 (37 overs)
Eoin Morgan 107* (101); Shoaib Akhtar 3/40 (10 overs)		Kamran Akmal 41 (53); Stuart Broad 3/25 (8 overs)

England won by 121 runs
Rose Bowl, Southampton
Umpires: Billy Doctrove (WI) and Ian Gould (Eng)
Player of the match: Eoin Morgan (Eng)

- England won the toss and elected to bat.

== Tour matches ==
=== First-class: Worcestershire vs Pakistan ===
13–14 August
Scorecard

Pakistan	v	Worcestershire
112/2 (28.1 overs); Mohammad Yousuf 40* (54); Chris Russell 1/43 (6 overs)

Match drawn
New Road, Worcester
Umpires: Richard Kettleborough and Steve Malone

- Pakistan won the toss and elected to bat.
- Play on day 1 was reduced due to rain and bad light.
- Play on day 2 was called off due to rain.

=== List A: Somerset vs Pakistan ===
2 September 2010
Scorecard

Pakistan; 264 (47.3 overs)	v	Somerset; 256/9 (50.0 overs)
Shahzaib Hasan 105 (120); Lewis Gregory 4/49 (10 overs)		Zander de Bruyn 122* (142); Saeed Ajmal 3/40 (10 overs)

Pakistan won by 8 runs
County Ground, Taunton
Umpires: Keith Coburn and Richard Illingworth

- Somerset won the toss and elected to field.
