= Lord's honours boards =

Boards at Lord's Cricket Ground in London

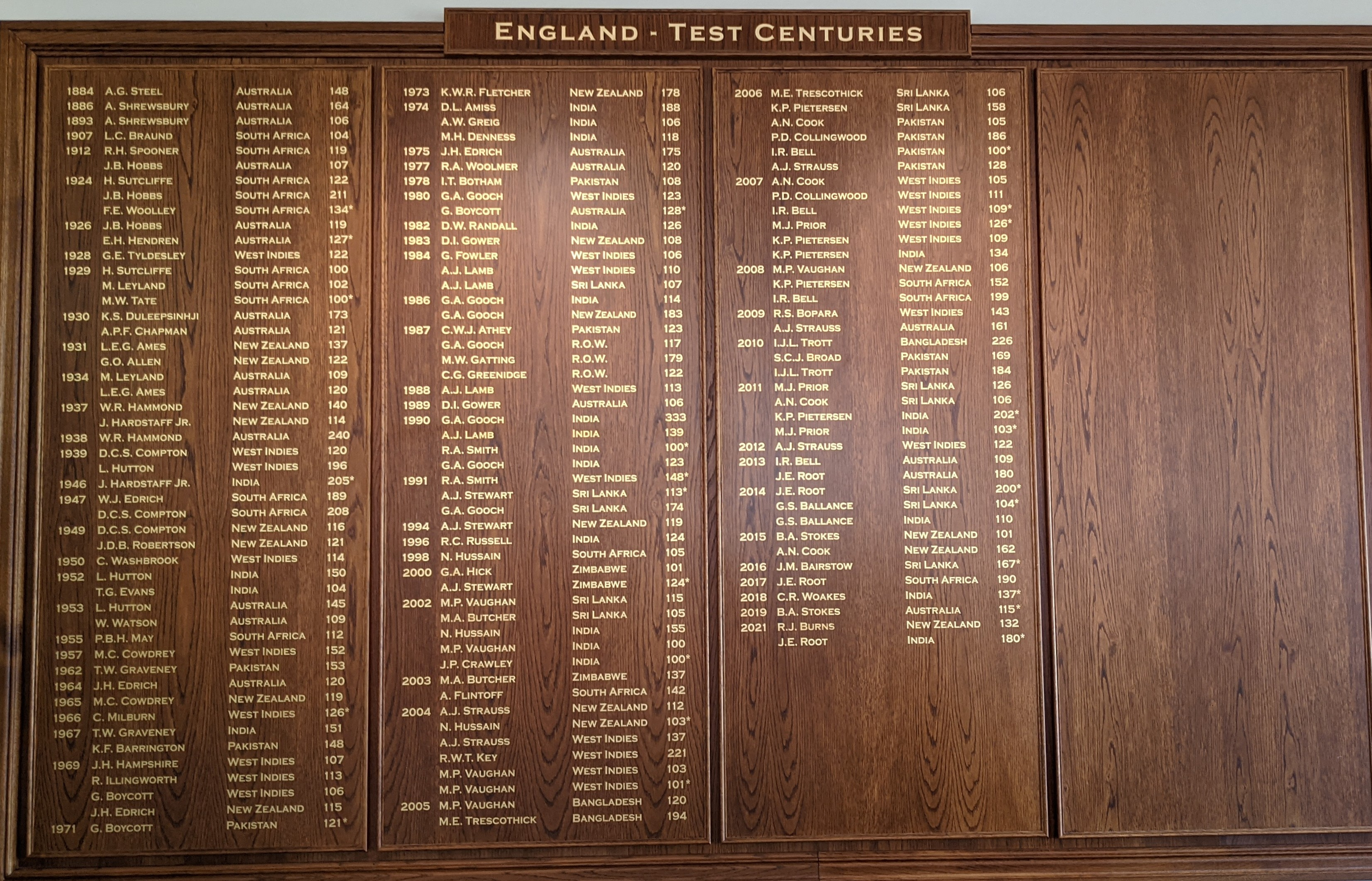
The honours board commemorating English centuries in 2021.

The Lord's honours boards are boards in the Pavilion at Lord's Cricket Ground in London, which commemorate cricket players who have scored a century, taken 5 wickets in a single innings, or taken 10 wickets in a match in either a Test match or limited-overs international match (such as One Day International) at Lord's. The boards initially only included achievements in Tests, but in 2019, recognition was added for ODIs, meaning that performances by female cricketers were recorded for the first time.

== Locations ==
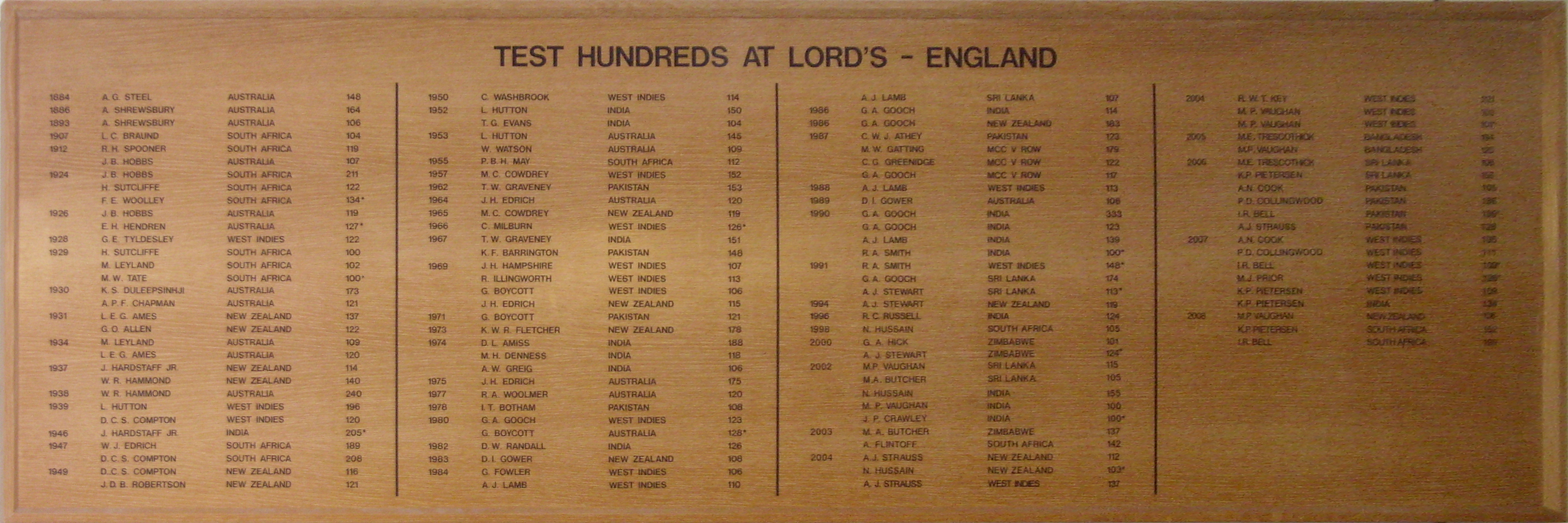
The original honours board commemorating English centuries. This board was replaced in 2019.

The honours boards are located in the dressing rooms in the pavilion with the boards commemorating England (or MCC) players in the home dressing room, and the boards commemorating players from other nationalities in the away dressing room. Both dressing rooms have separate boards for batting and bowling.

In 2010, to coincide with Lord's serving as a neutral venue for a Test match between Pakistan and Australia, the Marylebone Cricket Club created a "neutral" honours board to be placed in the away dressing room. This board was intended to commemorate players who reached the qualification criteria in Test matches at Lord's not involving England. The first players listed on the batting board were Warren Bardsley and Charles Kellaway, as they had both scored centuries at Lord's in a neutral Test for Australia against South Africa in 1912. The bowling board was then populated when Shane Watson and Marcus North each took five-wicket hauls in the neutral Test against Pakistan.

In February 2019, as part of a general refurbishment of the dressing rooms, the original honours boards were replaced with new boards. In addition, the walls over the dressing room exit out onto the team balconies now showcase centuries and five-wicket hauls made in limited-overs international matches (such as One-Day International) played on the ground: the England dressing room honours achievements made by English players, the away dressing room those made by other countries including those made during neutral matches. The limited-overs honours include all achievements made on the ground dating back to the establishment of ODI in 1971 as well as achievements by Women's ODI players.

== Achievement ==
It is a considered a great distinction to be named on either the batting or bowling honours boards. To be named on both is an exceptional achievement and only eleven players have managed this. These are England's Gubby Allen, Ray Illingworth, Ian Botham, Andrew Flintoff, Stuart Broad, Ben Stokes, Chris Woakes and Gus Atkinson along with Australia's Keith Miller, India's Vinoo Mankad and the West Indies' Garfield Sobers. (Note: Sobers is listed on the Bowling board for figures of 6/41 for Rest of the World against England in 1970, a game that no longer holds Test status.) Botham holds the record for the most appearances on the boards, with ten: eight five-wicket innings, one ten-wicket match and one century. A number of distinguished players such as Sachin Tendulkar, Virat Kohli, Shane Warne, Curtly Ambrose, Wasim Akram and Brian Lara are not named on the honours boards. Others like Ricky Ponting, Michael Atherton, and Muttiah Muralitharan were not listed on the Test boards but have since been recorded on the walls since the 2019 addition of ODI honours. Only two players appear on boards in both the home and away dressing rooms: Gordon Greenidge, by virtue of scoring a century for MCC against the Rest of the World in the match celebrating the bicentenary of MCC in 1987, (even though this has never been classified as an official Test match) and Kagiso Rabada, who took a five wicket haul for South Africa in both their 2022 tour of England and in the 2025 ICC World Test Championship final, in which South Africa were assigned the home dressing room.

=== Centuries ===
As of July 2025, 176 players have earned a place on the Test batting honours boards, scoring 259 centuries. (Note: This includes three players and five centuries in matches not considered Test matches by sources other than Lord's.) There have also been 33 centuries in men's ODIs and four in women's ODIs.

=== Five-wicket innings ===
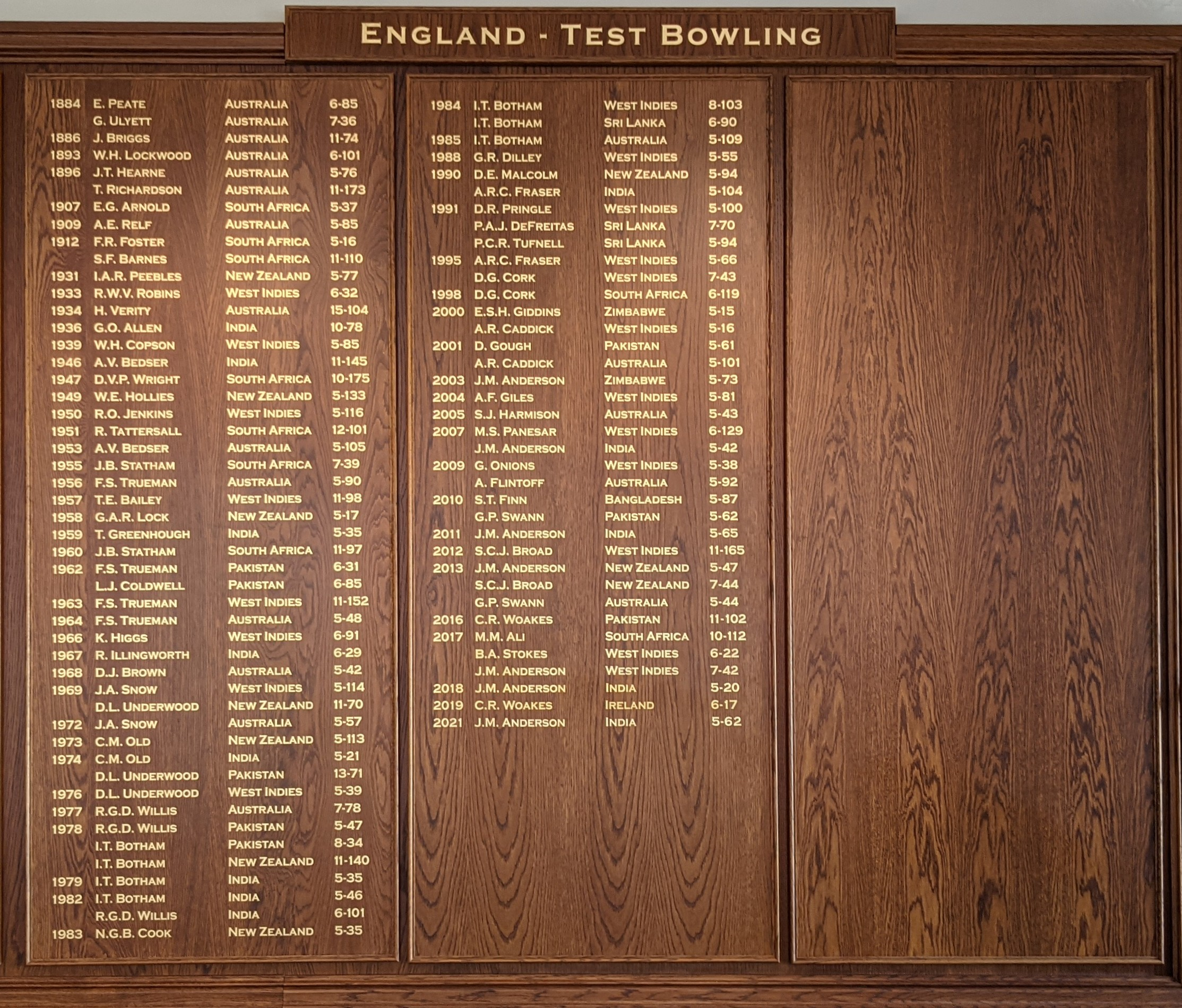
The honours board commemorating English five or ten wicket hauls in 2021.

As of July 2025, there have been 197 Test five-wicket innings at Lord's, spread among 137 players. In men's ODIs there have been 15 five-wicket hauls and three in women's ODIs.

=== Ten-wicket matches ===
As of July 2025, there have been 30 ten-wicket matches earn a spot on the boards, with Derek Underwood the only player to appear twice. Originally, a ten-wicket match haul was noted on the bowling honours board by showing the figures for each of the bowler's innings, which will always include at least one five-wicket innings haul. With the 2019 refurbishment, a combined match figure is displayed instead.
