= List of New Zealand national cricket captains =

This is a complete list of all of New Zealand's national cricket captains at official international level. As such it includes details of all the men who have captained at least one Test match or One Day International, all boys who have captained in at least one Youth Test or Youth ODI, and all women who have captained at least one women's Test match or women's one-day international. New Zealand became a full member of the Imperial Cricket Conference (now the International Cricket Council) on 31 May 1926 at the same time as India were made up to full membership, and their first-class cricket matches against other full member nations since that date have been Tests.

== Men's cricket ==
=== Test match captains ===
This is a list of cricketers who have captained the New Zealand national cricket team for at least one Test match. Where a player has a dagger (†) next to a Test match series in which he captained at least one Test, that denotes that player deputised for the appointed captain or was appointed for a minor proportion in a series.

The table of results is complete up to the end of the Test series against Zimbabwe in August 2025.

New Zealand Test match captains
Number	Portrait	Name	Year(s)	Opposition	Location	Played	Won	Lost	Drawn	Win %
1		Tom Lowry								
1		Tom Lowry	1929–30	England	New Zealand	4	0	1	3	
1		Tom Lowry	1931	England	England	3	0	1	2	
1		Tom Lowry	Total			7	0	2	5	0.00
2		Curly Page								
2		Curly Page	1931–32	South Africa	New Zealand	2	0	2	0	
2		Curly Page	1932–33	England	New Zealand	2	0	0	2	
2		Curly Page	1937	England	England	3	0	1	2	
2		Curly Page	Total			7	0	3	4	0.00
3		Walter Hadlee								
3		Walter Hadlee	1945–46	Australia	New Zealand	1	0	1	0	
3		Walter Hadlee	1946–47	England	New Zealand	1	0	0	1	
3		Walter Hadlee	1949	England	England	4	0	0	4	
3		Walter Hadlee	1950–51	England	New Zealand	2	0	1	1	
3		Walter Hadlee	Total			8	0	2	6	0.00
4		Bert Sutcliffe								
4		Bert Sutcliffe	1951–52	West Indies	New Zealand	2	0	1	1	
4		Bert Sutcliffe	1953–54 †	South Africa	South Africa	2	0	2	0	
4		Bert Sutcliffe	Total			4	0	3	1	0.00
5		Merv Wallace	1952–53	South Africa	New Zealand	2	0	1	1	0.00
6		Geoff Rabone								
6		Geoff Rabone	1953–54	South Africa	South Africa	3	0	2	1	
6		Geoff Rabone	1954–55	England	New Zealand	2	0	2	0	
6		Geoff Rabone	Total			5	0	4	1	0.00
7		Harry Cave								
7		Harry Cave	1955–56	Pakistan	Pakistan	3	0	2	1	
7		Harry Cave	1955–56	India	India	5	0	2	3	
7		Harry Cave	1955–56 †	West Indies	New Zealand	1	0	1	0	
7		Harry Cave	Total			9	0	5	4	0.00
8		John R. Reid								
8		John R. Reid	1955–56	West Indies	New Zealand	3	1	2	0	
8		John R. Reid	1958	England	England	5	0	4	1	
8		John R. Reid	1958–59	England	New Zealand	2	0	1	1	
8		John R. Reid	1961–62	South Africa	South Africa	5	2	2	1	
8		John R. Reid	1962–63	England	New Zealand	3	0	3	0	
8		John R. Reid	1963–64	South Africa	New Zealand	3	0	0	3	
8		John R. Reid	1964–65	Pakistan	New Zealand	3	0	0	3	
8		John R. Reid	1964–65	India	India	4	0	1	3	
8		John R. Reid	1964–65	Pakistan	Pakistan	3	0	2	1	
8		John R. Reid	1965	England	England	3	0	3	0	
8		John R. Reid	Total			34	3	18	13	8.82
9		Murray Chapple	1965-66	England	New Zealand	1	0	0	1	0.00
10		Barry Sinclair								
10		Barry Sinclair	1965–66	England	New Zealand	2	0	0	2	
10		Barry Sinclair	1967–68 †	India	New Zealand	1	0	1	0	
10		Barry Sinclair	Total			3	0	1	2	0.00
11		Graham Dowling								
11		Graham Dowling	1967–68	India	New Zealand	3	1	2	0	
11		Graham Dowling	1968–69	West Indies	New Zealand	3	1	1	1	
11		Graham Dowling	1969	England	England	3	0	2	1	
11		Graham Dowling	1969–70	India	India	3	1	1	1	
11		Graham Dowling	1969–70	Pakistan	Pakistan	3	1	0	2	
11		Graham Dowling	1970–71	England	New Zealand	2	0	1	1	
11		Graham Dowling	1971–72 †	West Indies	West Indies	2	0	0	2	
11		Graham Dowling	Total			19	4	7	8	21.05
12		Bevan Congdon								
12		Bevan Congdon	1971–72	West Indies	West Indies	3	0	0	3	
12		Bevan Congdon	1972–73	Pakistan	New Zealand	3	0	1	2	
12		Bevan Congdon	1973	England	England	3	0	2	1	
12		Bevan Congdon	1973–74	Australia	Australia	3	0	2	1	
12		Bevan Congdon	1973–74	Australia	New Zealand	3	1	1	1	
12		Bevan Congdon	1974–75	England	New Zealand	2	0	1	1	
12		Bevan Congdon	Total			17	1	7	9	5.88
13		Glenn Turner								
13		Glenn Turner	1975–76	India	New Zealand	3	1	1	1	
13		Glenn Turner	1976–77	Pakistan	Pakistan	2	0	2	0	
13		Glenn Turner	1976–77	India	India	3	0	2	1	
13		Glenn Turner	1976–77	Australia	New Zealand	2	0	1	1	
13		Glenn Turner	Total			10	1	6	3	10.00
14		John Parker	1976-77 †	Pakistan	Pakistan	1	0	0	1	0.00
15		Mark Burgess								
15		Mark Burgess	1977–78	England	New Zealand	3	1	1	1	
15		Mark Burgess	1978	England	England	3	0	3	0	
15		Mark Burgess	1978–79	Pakistan	New Zealand	3	0	1	2	
15		Mark Burgess	1980–81 †	Australia	Australia	1	0	1	0	
15		Mark Burgess	Total			10	1	6	3	10.00
16		Geoff Howarth								
16		Geoff Howarth	1979–80	West Indies	New Zealand	3	1	0	2	
16		Geoff Howarth	1980–81	Australia	Australia	2	0	1	1	
16		Geoff Howarth	1980–81	India	New Zealand	3	1	0	2	
16		Geoff Howarth	1981–82	Australia	New Zealand	3	1	1	1	
16		Geoff Howarth	1982–83	Sri Lanka	New Zealand	2	2	0	0	
16		Geoff Howarth	1983	England	England	4	1	3	0	
16		Geoff Howarth	1983–84	England	New Zealand	3	1	0	2	
16		Geoff Howarth	1983–84	Sri Lanka	Sri Lanka	3	2	0	1	
16		Geoff Howarth	1984–85	Pakistan	New Zealand	3	2	0	1	
16		Geoff Howarth	1984–85	West Indies	West Indies	4	0	2	2	
16		Geoff Howarth	Total			30	11	7	12	36.67
17		Jeremy Coney								
17		Jeremy Coney	1984–85	Pakistan	Pakistan	3	0	2	1	
17		Jeremy Coney	1985–86	Australia	Australia	3	2	1	0	
17		Jeremy Coney	1985–86	Australia	New Zealand	3	1	0	2	
17		Jeremy Coney	1986	England	England	3	1	0	2	
17		Jeremy Coney	1986–87	West Indies	New Zealand	3	1	1	1	
17		Jeremy Coney	Total			15	5	4	6	33.33
18		Jeff Crowe^{1}								
18		Jeff Crowe^{1}	1986–87	Sri Lanka	Sri Lanka	1	0	0	1	
18		Jeff Crowe^{1}	1987–88	Australia	Australia	3	0	1	2	
18		Jeff Crowe^{1}	1987–88	England	New Zealand	2	0	0	2	
18		Jeff Crowe^{1}	Total			6	0	1	5	0.00
19		John Wright								
19		John Wright	1987–88 †	England	New Zealand	1	0	0	1	
19		John Wright	1988–89	India	India	3	1	2	0	
19		John Wright	1988–89	Pakistan	New Zealand	2	0	0	2	
19		John Wright	1989–90	Australia	Australia	1	0	0	1	
19		John Wright	1989–90	India	New Zealand	3	1	0	2	
19		John Wright	1989–90	Australia	New Zealand	1	1	0	0	
19		John Wright	1990	England	England	3	0	1	2	
19		John Wright	Total			14	3	3	8	21.42
20		Martin Crowe^{1}								
20		Martin Crowe^{1}	1990–91	Pakistan	Pakistan	3	0	3	0	
20		Martin Crowe^{1}	1990–91	Sri Lanka	New Zealand	2	0	0	2	
20		Martin Crowe^{1}	1991–92	England	New Zealand	3	0	2	1	
20		Martin Crowe^{1}	1992–93	Zimbabwe	Zimbabwe	2	1	0	1	
20		Martin Crowe^{1}	1992–93	Sri Lanka	Sri Lanka	2	0	1	1	
20		Martin Crowe^{1}	1992–93	Australia	New Zealand	3	1	1	1	
20		Martin Crowe^{1}	1993–94	Australia	Australia	1	0	0	1	
20		Martin Crowe^{1}	Total			16	2	7	7	12.50
21		Ian Smith	1990–91 †	Sri Lanka	New Zealand	1	0	0	0.00	
22		Ken Rutherford								
22		Ken Rutherford	1992–93	Pakistan	New Zealand	1	0	1	0	
22		Ken Rutherford	1993–94 †	Australia	Australia	2	0	2	0	
22		Ken Rutherford	1993–94	Pakistan	New Zealand	3	1	2	0	
22		Ken Rutherford	1993–94	India	New Zealand	1	0	0	1	
22		Ken Rutherford	1994	England	England	3	0	1	2	
22		Ken Rutherford	1994–95	South Africa	South Africa	3	1	2	0	
22		Ken Rutherford	1994–95	West Indies	New Zealand	2	0	1	1	
22		Ken Rutherford	1994–95	South Africa	New Zealand	1	0	1	0	
22		Ken Rutherford	1994–95	Sri Lanka	New Zealand	2	0	1	1	
22		Ken Rutherford	Total			18	2	11	5	11.11
23		Lee Germon								
23		Lee Germon	1995–96	India	India	3	0	1	2	
23		Lee Germon	1995–96	Pakistan	New Zealand	1	0	1	0	
23		Lee Germon	1995–96	Zimbabwe	New Zealand	2	0	0	2	
23		Lee Germon	1995–96	West Indies	West Indies	2	0	1	1	
23		Lee Germon	1996–97	Pakistan	Pakistan	2	1	1	0	
23		Lee Germon	1996–97	England	New Zealand	2	0	1	1	
23		Lee Germon	Total			12	1	5	6	8.33
24		Stephen Fleming								
24		Stephen Fleming	1996–97 †	England	New Zealand	1	0	1	0	
24		Stephen Fleming	1996–97	Sri Lanka	New Zealand	2	2	0	0	
24		Stephen Fleming	1997–98	Zimbabwe	Zimbabwe	2	0	0	2	
24		Stephen Fleming	1997–98	Australia	Australia	3	0	2	1	
24		Stephen Fleming	1997–98	Zimbabwe	New Zealand	2	2	0	0	
24		Stephen Fleming	1998	Sri Lanka	Sri Lanka	3	1	2	0	
24		Stephen Fleming	1998–99	India	New Zealand	2	1	0	1	
24		Stephen Fleming	1999	England	England	4	2	1	1	
24		Stephen Fleming	1999–2000	India	India	3	0	1	2	
24		Stephen Fleming	1999–2000	West Indies	New Zealand	2	2	0	0	
24		Stephen Fleming	1999–2000	Australia	New Zealand	3	0	3	0	
24		Stephen Fleming	2000–01	Zimbabwe	Zimbabwe	2	2	0	0	
24		Stephen Fleming	2000–01	South Africa	South Africa	3	0	2	1	
24		Stephen Fleming	2000–01	Zimbabwe	New Zealand	1	0	0	1	
24		Stephen Fleming	2000–01	Pakistan	New Zealand	3	1	1	1	
24		Stephen Fleming	2001–02	Australia	Australia	3	0	0	3	
24		Stephen Fleming	2001–02	Bangladesh	New Zealand	2	2	0	0	
24		Stephen Fleming	2001–02	England	New Zealand	3	1	1	1	
24		Stephen Fleming	2002	Pakistan	Pakistan	1	0	1	0	
24		Stephen Fleming	2002	West Indies	West Indies	2	1	0	1	
24		Stephen Fleming	2002–03	India	New Zealand	2	2	0	0	
24		Stephen Fleming	2003	Sri Lanka	Sri Lanka	2	0	0	2	
24		Stephen Fleming	2003–04	India	India	2	0	0	2	
24		Stephen Fleming	2003–04	Pakistan	New Zealand	2	0	1	1	
24		Stephen Fleming	2003–04	South Africa	New Zealand	3	1	1	1	
24		Stephen Fleming	2004	England	England	3	0	3	0	
24		Stephen Fleming	2004–05	Bangladesh	Bangladesh	2	2	0	0	
24		Stephen Fleming	2004–05	Australia	Australia	2	0	2	0	
24		Stephen Fleming	2004–05	Australia	New Zealand	3	0	2	1	
24		Stephen Fleming	2004–05	Sri Lanka	New Zealand	2	1	0	1	
24		Stephen Fleming	2005	Zimbabwe	Zimbabwe	2	2	0	0	
24		Stephen Fleming	2005–06	West Indies	New Zealand	3	2	0	1	
24		Stephen Fleming	2005–06	South Africa	South Africa	3	0	2	1	
24		Stephen Fleming	2006–07	Sri Lanka	New Zealand	2	1	1	0	
24		Stephen Fleming	Total			80	28	27	25	35.00
25		Dion Nash	1998–99	South Africa	New Zealand	3	0	1	2	0.00
26		Daniel Vettori								
26		Daniel Vettori	2007–08	South Africa	South Africa	2	0	2	0	
26		Daniel Vettori	2007–08	Bangladesh	New Zealand	2	2	0	0	
26		Daniel Vettori	2007–08	England	New Zealand	3	1	2	0	
26		Daniel Vettori	2008	England	England	3	0	2	1	
26		Daniel Vettori	2008–09	Bangladesh	Bangladesh	2	1	0	1	
26		Daniel Vettori	2008–09	Australia	Australia	2	0	2	0	
26		Daniel Vettori	2008–09	West Indies	New Zealand	2	0	0	2	
26		Daniel Vettori	2008–09	India	New Zealand	3	0	1	2	
26		Daniel Vettori	2009	Sri Lanka	Sri Lanka	2	0	2	0	
26		Daniel Vettori	2009–10	Pakistan	New Zealand	3	1	1	1	
26		Daniel Vettori	2009–10	Bangladesh	New Zealand	1	1	0	0	
26		Daniel Vettori	2009–10	Australia	New Zealand	2	0	2	0	
26		Daniel Vettori	2010–11	India	India	3	0	1	2	
26		Daniel Vettori	2010–11	Pakistan	New Zealand	2	0	1	1	
26		Daniel Vettori	Total			32	6	16	10	18.75
27		Ross Taylor								
27		Ross Taylor	2011–12	Zimbabwe	Zimbabwe	1	1	0	0	
27		Ross Taylor	2011–12	Australia	Australia	2	1	1	0	
27		Ross Taylor	2011–12	Zimbabwe	New Zealand	1	1	0	0	
27		Ross Taylor	2011–12	South Africa	New Zealand	3	0	1	2	
27		Ross Taylor	2012	West Indies	West Indies	2	0	2	0	
27		Ross Taylor	2012	India	India	2	0	2	0	
27		Ross Taylor	2012–13	Sri Lanka	Sri Lanka	2	1	1	0	
27		Ross Taylor	2016–17 †	India	India	1	0	1	0	
27		Ross Taylor	Total			14	4	8	2	28.57
28		Brendon McCullum								
28		Brendon McCullum	2012–13	South Africa	South Africa	2	0	2	0	
28		Brendon McCullum	2012–13	England	New Zealand	3	0	0	3	
28		Brendon McCullum	2013	England	England	2	0	2	0	
28		Brendon McCullum	2013–14	Bangladesh	Bangladesh	2	0	0	2	
28		Brendon McCullum	2013–14	West Indies	New Zealand	3	2	0	1	
28		Brendon McCullum	2013–14	India	New Zealand	2	1	0	1	
28		Brendon McCullum	2014	West Indies	West Indies	3	2	1	0	
28		Brendon McCullum	2014–15	Pakistan	United Arab Emirates	3	1	1	1	
28		Brendon McCullum	2014–15	Sri Lanka	New Zealand	2	2	0	0	
28		Brendon McCullum	2015	England	England	2	1	1	0	
28		Brendon McCullum	2015–16	Australia	Australia	3	0	2	1	
28		Brendon McCullum	2015–16	Sri Lanka	New Zealand	2	2	0	0	
28		Brendon McCullum	2015–16	Australia	New Zealand	2	0	2	0	
28		Brendon McCullum	Total			31	11	11	9	35.48
29		Kane Williamson								
29		Kane Williamson	2016	Zimbabwe	Zimbabwe	2	2	0	0	
29		Kane Williamson	2016	South Africa	South Africa	2	0	1	1	
29		Kane Williamson	2016–17	India	India	2	0	2	0	
29		Kane Williamson	2016–17	Pakistan	New Zealand	2	2	0	0	
29		Kane Williamson	2016–17	Bangladesh	New Zealand	2	2	0	0	
29		Kane Williamson	2016–17	South Africa	New Zealand	3	0	1	2	
29		Kane Williamson	2017–18	West Indies	New Zealand	2	2	0	0	
29		Kane Williamson	2017–18	England	New Zealand	2	1	0	1	
29		Kane Williamson	2018–19	Pakistan	United Arab Emirates	3	2	1	0	
29		Kane Williamson	2018–19	Sri Lanka	New Zealand	2	1	0	1	
29		Kane Williamson	2018–19	Bangladesh	New Zealand	2	2	0	0	
29		Kane Williamson	2019	Sri Lanka	Sri Lanka	2	1	1	0	
29		Kane Williamson	2019–20	England	New Zealand	2	1	0	1	
29		Kane Williamson	2019–20	Australia	Australia	2	0	2	0	
29		Kane Williamson	2019–20	India	New Zealand	2	2	0	0	
29		Kane Williamson	2020–21	West Indies	New Zealand	1	1	0	0	
29		Kane Williamson	2020–21	Pakistan	New Zealand	2	2	0	0	
29		Kane Williamson	2021	England	England	1	0	0	1	
29		Kane Williamson	2021	India	England	1	1	0	0	
29		Kane Williamson	2021–22	India	India	1	0	0	1	
29		Kane Williamson	2022	England	England	2	0	2	0	
29		Kane Williamson	Total			40	22	10	8	55.00
30		Tom Latham								
30		Tom Latham	2019–20 †	Australia	Australia	1	0	1	0	
30		Tom Latham	2020–21 †	West Indies	New Zealand	1	1	0	0	
30		Tom Latham	2021 †	England	England	1	1	0	0	
30		Tom Latham	2021–22 †	India	India	1	0	1	0	
30		Tom Latham	2021–22	Bangladesh	New Zealand	2	1	1	0	
30		Tom Latham	2021–22 †	South Africa	New Zealand	2	1	1	0	
30		Tom Latham	2022 †	England	England	1	0	1	0	
30		Tom Latham	2024	India	India	3	3	0	0	
30		Tom Latham	2024	England	New Zealand	3	1	2	0	
30		Tom Latham	2025	West Indies	New Zealand	3	2	0	1	
30		Tom Latham	Total			18	10	7	1	55.56
31		Tim Southee								
31		Tim Southee	2022–23	Pakistan	Pakistan	2	0	0	2	
31		Tim Southee	2022–23	England	New Zealand	2	1	1	0	
31		Tim Southee	2022–23	Sri Lanka	New Zealand	2	2	0	0	
31		Tim Southee	2022–23	Bangladesh	Bangladesh	2	1	1	0	
31		Tim Southee	2023–24	South Africa	New Zealand	2	2	0	0	
31		Tim Southee	2024	Australia	New Zealand	2	0	2	0	
31		Tim Southee	2024	Sri Lanka	Sri Lanka	2	0	2	0	
31		Tim Southee	Total			14	6	6	2	42.85
32		Mitchell Santner								
32		Mitchell Santner	2025	Zimbabwe	Zimbabwe	2	2	0	0	
32		Mitchell Santner	Total			2	2	0	0	100
Grand Total						483	123	189	171	25.46

Note:

- ^{1} Jeff Crowe and Martin Crowe are brothers.

=== Men's One-Day International captains ===
This is a list of cricketers who have captained the New Zealand national cricket team for at least one One Day International.

New Zealand ODI captains
Number	Name	Year(s)	Played	Won	Lost	Tied	NR	Win %
1	Bevan Congdon	1973–1975	7	1	3	0	3	25.00
2	Glenn Turner	1975–1976	7	5	2	0	0	71.42
3	Mark Burgess	1978–1980	8	2	6	0	0	25.00
4	Geoff Howarth	1980–1985	60	31	26	0	3	54.39
5	John Wright	1983–1990	31	16	15	0	0	51.61
6	Jeremy Coney	1984–1987	25	8	16	0	1	33.33
7	Jeff Crowe	1986–1988	16	4	12	0	0	25.00
8	Martin Crowe	1990–1993	44	21	22	0	1	48.84
9	Andrew Jones	1992	2	0	2	0	0	0.00
10	Ken Rutherford	1993–1994	37	10	24	1	2	28.57
11	Gavin Larsen	1994	3	1	2	0	0	33.33
12	Lee Germon	1995–1997	36	15	19	2	0	41.67
13	Stephen Fleming	1997–2007	218	98	106	1	13	47.80
14	Dion Nash	1999	7	3	3	0	1	50.00
15	Craig McMillan	2001–2002	8	2	6	0	0	25.00
16	Chris Cairns	2002–2003	7	1	6	0	0	14.29
17	Daniel Vettori	2004–2011	82	41	33	1	7	54.67
18	Brendon McCullum	2009–2016	62	36	22	1	3	61.02
19	Ross Taylor	2010–2012	20	6	12	0	2	30.00
20	Kane Williamson	2012–2023	91	46	40	1	4	52.87
21	Kyle Mills	2013–2014	4	1	2	0	1	33.33
22	Tom Latham	2017–2023	44	28	15	0	1	63.04
23	Tim Southee	2018	1	0	1	0	0	0.00
24	Mitchell Santner	2022-2025	21	15	5	0	1	75.00
25	Lockie Ferguson	2023	3	2	0	0	1	100.00
26	Michael Bracewell	2025-2026	6	5	1	0	0	83.33
Grand total			853	399	403	7	44	49.32

=== Twenty20 International captains ===
This is a list of cricketers who have captained the New Zealand national cricket team for at least one Twenty20 International.

New Zealand Twenty20 International captains
No.	Name	Year(s)	Played	Won	Lost	Tied	NR	Win %
1	Stephen Fleming	2005–2006	5	2	2	1	0	40.00
2	Daniel Vettori	2007–2010	28	13	13	2	0	46.43
3	Brendon McCullum	2008–2015	28	13	14	0	1	48.15
4	Ross Taylor	2010–2012	13	6	4	2	1	50.00
5	Kane Williamson	2012–2024	75	39	34	1	1	52.70
6	Kyle Mills	2013	2	1	1	0	0	50.00
7	Tim Southee	2017–2023	29	17	9	3	0	58.62
8	Mitchell Santner	2020–2026	56	30	20	0	6	60.00
9	Tom Latham	2021–2023	13	6	5	1	1	50.00
10	Michael Bracewell	2024–2025	13	6	5	0	2	54.55
11	Daryl Mitchell	2026	1	1	0	0	0	100.00
12	James Neesham	2026	2	0	2	0	0	0.00
13	Nick Kelly	2026	1	0	1	0	0	0.00
Grand total			266	134	110	10	12	52.76

=== Captains in Men's ICC tournaments ===
NZ Captains in ICC Tournaments
Tournament	Name	Format	Played	Won	Lost	Tied	NR	Finish	Win %
1975 Cricket World Cup	Glenn Turner	ODI (60 overs)	4	2	2	0	0	Semi-Finals	50.00
1979 Cricket World Cup	Mark Burgess	ODI (60 overs)	4	2	2	0	0	Semi-Finals	50.00
1983 Cricket World Cup	Geoff Howarth	ODI (60 overs)	6	3	3	0	0	Group stage	50.00
1987 Cricket World Cup	Jeremy Coney	ODI	6	2	4	0	0	Group stage	33.33
1992 Cricket World Cup	Martin Crowe	ODI	9	7	2	0	0	Semi-Finals	77.78
1996 Cricket World Cup	Lee Germon	ODI	6	3	3	0	0	Quarter-Finals	50.00
1998 ICC KnockOut Trophy	Stephen Fleming	ODI	1	0	1	0	0	Quarter-Finals	0.00
1999 Cricket World Cup	Stephen Fleming	ODI	11	5	5	0	1	Semi-Finals	50.00
2000 ICC KnockOut Trophy	Stephen Fleming	ODI	3	3	0	0	0	Champions	100.00
2002 Champions Trophy	Stephen Fleming	ODI	2	1	1	0	0	Group Stage	50.00
2003 Cricket World Cup	Stephen Fleming	ODI	11	5	6	0	0	Super Six	55.55
2004 Champions Trophy	Stephen Fleming	ODI	2	1	1	0	0	Group Stage	50.00
2006 Champions Trophy	Stephen Fleming	ODI	4	2	2	0	0	Semi-Finals	50.00
2007 Cricket World Cup	Stephen Fleming	ODI	11	8	3	0	0	Semi-Finals	72.72
2007 World Twenty20	Daniel Vettori	T20I	6	3	3	0	0	Semi-Finals	50.00
2009 World Twenty20	Daniel Vettori	T20I	5	2	3	0	0	Super 8	40.00
2009 Champions Trophy	Daniel Vettori	ODI	5	3	2	0	0	Runners-up	60.00
2010 World Twenty20	Daniel Vettori	T20I	5	3	2	0	0	Super 8	60.00
2011 Cricket World Cup	Daniel Vettori	ODI	8	5	3	0	0	Semi-Finals	62.50
2012 World Twenty20	Ross Taylor	T20I	5	1	4	0	0	Super 8	20.00
2013 Champions Trophy	Brendon McCullum	ODI	3	1	1	0	1	Group Stage	50.00
2014 World Twenty20	Brendon McCullum	T20I	4	2	2	0	0	Super 10	50.00
2015 Cricket World Cup	Brendon McCullum	ODI	9	8	1	0	0	Runners-up	88.89
2016 World Twenty20	Kane Williamson	T20I	5	4	1	0	0	Semi-Finals	80.00
2017 Champions Trophy	Kane Williamson	ODI	3	0	2	0	1	Group Stage	0.00
2019 Cricket World Cup	Kane Williamson	ODI	11	6	4	0	1	Runners-up	60.00
2021 ICC World Test Championship Final	Kane Williamson	Test	1	1	0	0	0	Champions	100.00
2021 World Twenty20	Kane Williamson	T20I	7	5	2	0	0	Runners-up	71.43
2022 Men's T20 World Cup	Kane Williamson	T20I	6	3	2	0	1	Semi-Finals	60.00
2023 Cricket World Cup	Kane Williamson	ODI	10	5	5	0	0	Semi-Finals	50.00
2024 Men's T20 World Cup	Kane Williamson	T20I	4	2	2	0	0	Group Stage	50.00
2025 Champions Trophy	Mitchell Santner	ODI	5	3	2	0	0	Runners-up	60.00
2026 Men's T20 World Cup	Mitchell Santner	T20I	9	5	3	0	1	Runners-up	55.56

== Women's cricket ==
=== Test match captains ===
This is a list of cricketers who have captained the New Zealand women's cricket team for at least one women's Test match.

New Zealand women's Test match captains
Number	Name	Year	Opposition	Location	Played	Won	Lost	Drawn	Win %
1	Ruth Symons	1934/35	England	New Zealand	1	0	1	0	0.00
2	Ina Lamason								
2	Ina Lamason	1947/48	Australia	New Zealand	1	0	1	0	
2	Ina Lamason	1948/49	England	New Zealand	1	0	1	0	
2	Ina Lamason	Total			2	0	2	0	0.00
3	Rona McKenzie								
3	Rona McKenzie	1954	England	England	3	0	1	2	
3	Rona McKenzie	1956/57	Australia	Australia	1	0	1	0	
3	Rona McKenzie	1957/58	England	New Zealand	2	0	0	2	
3	Rona McKenzie	1960/61	Australia	New Zealand	1	0	0	1	
3	Rona McKenzie	Total			7	0	2	5	0.00
4	Trish McKelvey								
4	Trish McKelvey	1966	England	England	3	0	0	3	
4	Trish McKelvey	1968/69	England	New Zealand	3	0	2	1	
4	Trish McKelvey	1971/72	Australia	Australia	1	1	0	0	
4	Trish McKelvey	1971/72	South Africa	South Africa	3	1	0	2	
4	Trish McKelvey	1974/75	Australia	New Zealand	1	0	0	1	
4	Trish McKelvey	1976/77	India	New Zealand	1	0	0	1	
4	Trish McKelvey	1978/79	Australia	Australia	3	0	1	2	
4	Trish McKelvey	Total			15	2	3	10	13.33
5	Debbie Hockley								
5	Debbie Hockley	1984	England	England	3	0	0	3	
5	Debbie Hockley	1984/85	India	India	3	0	0	3	
5	Debbie Hockley	Total			6	0	0	6	0.00
6	Lesley Murdoch	1989/90	Australia	New Zealand	3	0	1	2	0.00
7	Karen Plummer	1991/92	England	New Zealand	3	0	1	2	0.00
8	Sarah Illingworth								
8	Sarah Illingworth	1994/95	India	New Zealand	1	0	0	1	
8	Sarah Illingworth	1994/95	Australia	New Zealand	1	0	0	1	
8	Sarah Illingworth	1995/96	Australia	Australia	1	0	0	1	
8	Sarah Illingworth	1996	England	England	3	0	0	3	
8	Sarah Illingworth	Total			6	0	0	6	0.00
9	Maia Lewis								
9	Maia Lewis	2003/04	India	India	1	0	0	1	
9	Maia Lewis	2004	England	England	1	0	0	1	
9	Maia Lewis	Total			2	0	0	2	0.00
Grand total					45	2	10	33	4.44

=== Women's One-Day International captains ===
This is a list of cricketers who have captained the New Zealand women's cricket team for at least one women's one-day international. New Zealand's greatest ODI success was under Emily Drumm when they won the 2000/1 World Cup.

New Zealand women's ODI captains
Number	Name	Year	Played	Won	Lost	Tied	NR	Win %
1	Bev Brentnall	1973	5	3	2	0	0	60.00
2	Trish McKelvey	1978-1982	15	7	7	1	0	46.67
3	Debbie Hockley	1984-1999	27	12	15	0	0	44.44
4	Ingrid Jagersma	1985	1	1	0	0	0	100.00
5	Lesley Murdoch	1986-1990	15	8	6	0	1	57.14
6	Karen Plummer	1992	3	1	2	0	0	33.33
7	Sarah Illingworth	1993-1996	29	18	10	0	1	64.29
8	Maia Lewis	1997-2005	45	19	24	1	1	43.18
9	Emily Drumm	2000-2003	41	28	12	0	1	70.00
10	Catherine Campbell	2000	2	2	0	0	0	100.00
11	Haidee Tiffen	2004–2009	45	24	21	0	0	53.33
12	Aimee Watkins	2008–2011	22	3	18	0	1	14.29
13	Amy Satterthwaite	2010–2022	13	5	8	0	0	38.46
14	Suzie Bates	2011–2025	79	42	35	0	2	54.55
15	Sophie Devine	2020–2025	56	18	33	1	4	34.62
16	Amelia Kerr	2024-2026	8	5	3	0	0	62.50
Grand total			406	196	196	3	11	49.62

=== Women's Twenty20 International captains ===
This is a list of cricketers who have captained the New Zealand women's cricket team for at least one Twenty20 International match.

New Zealand women's Twenty20 International captains
Number	Name	Year	Played	Won	Lost	Tied	NR	Win %
1	Maia Lewis	2004	1	1	0	0	0	100.00
2	Haidee Tiffen	2006–2009	8	3	4	1	0	37.50
3	Aimee Watkins	2009–2011	29	19	10	0	0	65.52
4	Suzie Bates	2012–2025	72	40	30	1	1	56.34
5	Sophie Devine	2014–2024	64	30	31	1	2	48.39
6	Amy Satterthwaite	2018–2021	12	6	5	0	1	54.55
7	Amelia Kerr	2023–2024	10	8	2	0	0	80.00
Grand total			196	107	82	3	4	55.73

== Youth cricket ==
=== Test match captains ===
This is a list of cricketers who have captained the New Zealand Under-19 cricket team for at least one under-19 Test match. Where a player has a dagger (†) next to a Test match series in which he captained at least one Test, that denotes that player was captain for a minor proportion in a series.

New Zealand Under-19 Test match captains
Number	Name	Year	Opposition	Location	Played	Won	Lost	Drawn	Win %
1	David Hartshorn	1985/86	Australia	Australia	3	0	0	3	0.00
2	John Murtagh	1986/87	Australia	New Zealand	3	0	2	1	0.00
3	Lee Germon								
3	Lee Germon	1987/88	India	New Zealand	1	1	0	0	
3	Lee Germon	1988/89	Australia	Australia	3	0	2	1	
3	Lee Germon	Total			4	1	2	1	25.00
4	Chris Cairns	1989	England	England	3	1	0	2	33.33
5	Llorne Howell								
5	Llorne Howell	1990/91	England	New Zealand	3	2	0	1	
5	Llorne Howell	1991/92	India	India	2	0	1	1	
5	Llorne Howell	Total			5	2	1	2	40.00
6	Stephen Fleming	1992/93	Australia	New Zealand	2	1	0	1	50.00
7	Richard Jones	1993/94	Pakistan	Pakistan	3	0	0	3	0.00
8	Stephen Lynch	1994/95	Pakistan	New Zealand	3	0	0	3	0.00
9	Craig McMillan								
9	Craig McMillan	1995/96	Australia	Australia	3	1	2	0	
9	Craig McMillan	1996	England	England	3	1	0	2	
9	Craig McMillan	Total			6	2	2	2	33.33
10	Jarrod Englefield	1998/99	England	New Zealand	3	1	1	1	33.33
11	Brendon McCullum	2000/01	South Africa	New Zealand	3	2	0	1	66.67
12	Andrew de Boorder	2007	India	New Zealand	3	1	1	1	33.33
13	George Worker	2008	England	England	1	0	1	0	0.00
14	Kane Williamson	2008	England	England	1	0	0	1	0.00
Grand total					43	11	10	22	25.58

=== Youth One-Day International captains ===
This is a list of cricketers who have captained the New Zealand Under-19 cricket team for at least one Under-19 One Day International.

New Zealand Under-19 ODI captains
Number	Name	Year	Played	Won	Lost	Tied	NR	Win %
1	David Hartshorn	1986	3	0	3	0	0	0.00
2	John Murtagh	1987	3	0	3	0	0	0.00
3	Lee Germon	1988-1989	10	2	8	0	0	20.00
4	Chris Cairns	1989	2	0	2	0	0	0.00
5	David Mills	1989	2	0	2	0	0	0.00
6	Llorne Howell	1991-1992	5	3	2	0	0	60.00
7	Stephen Fleming	1993	3	1	2	0	0	33.33
8	Richard Jones	1994	3	1	2	0	0	33.33
9	Stephen Lynch	1995	3	2	1	0	0	66.67
10	Craig McMillan	1996	5	3	2	0	0	60.00
11	Jarrod Englefield	1998-1999	10	6	4	0	60.00	
12	James Franklin	2000	5	1	4	0	0	20.00
13	Brendon McCullum	2001	3	1	1	0	1	50.00
14	Ross Taylor	2002	6	3	2	0	1	66.67
15	Daniel Flynn	2004	6	2	4	0	0	33.33
16	Marc Ellison	2006	6	3	3	0	0	50.00
17	Andrew de Boorder	2007	3	1	2	1	0	33.33
18	Kane Williamson	2008	10	4	3	1	2	50.00
19	Craig Cachopa	2010	6	4	2	0	0	66.67
20	Will Young	2012	11	4	7	0	0	36.36
21	Tim Seifert	2013	3	1	2	0	0	33.33
22	Leo Carter	2013	4	1	3	0	0	25.00
23	Robert O'Donnell	2014	6	3	3	0	0	50.00
24	Josh Finnie	2016	9	4	5	0	0	44.44
25	Rachin Ravindra	2016	1	0	1	0	0	0.00
26	Kaylum Boshier	2018	7	3	4	0	0	42.86
27	Ollie White	2019	5	0	4	0	1	0.00
28	Rhys Mariu	2019	2	0	2	0	0	0.00
29	Jesse Tashkoff	2019-2020	11	4	6	0	1	40.00
30	Oscar Jackson	2024	5	2	3	0	0	40.00
31	Tom Jones	2026	5	0	3	0	2	0.00
Grand total			164	59	96	1	8	37.82

== See also ==
- New Zealand national cricket team
