= Gordon Burgess =

New Zealand cricketer and administrator

Gordon Burgess OBE
Personal information
- Full name: Gordon Charles Burgess
- Born: 4 October 1918; Waihi, New Zealand
- Died: 3 September 2000 (aged 81); Auckland, New Zealand
- Batting: Right-handed
- Relatives: Mark Burgess (son); Alan Burgess (cousin)

Domestic team information
- Years: Team
- 1940/41–1954/55: Auckland

Career statistics
Competition	First-class
Matches	7
Runs scored	219
Batting average	18.25
100s/50s	0/0
Top score	35
Catches/stumpings	1/–
- Source: ESPNcricinfo, 19 June 2021

Gordon Charles Burgess OBE (4 October 1918 – 3 September 2000) was a New Zealand cricket player and administrator.

== Life and family ==
Born in Waihi on 4 October 1918, Burgess was the son of Edith Alice Burgess and Walter Neilson Burgess. He was educated at Mount Albert Grammar School in Auckland, and worked for Auckland City Council as a clerk and valuer from 1935 to 1951. In 1942, Burgess married June Frankham, and the couple went on to have three children, including Mark Burgess who played Test cricket for New Zealand.

During World War II, Burgess served as a lieutenant in the New Zealand Army between 1942 and 1944. He completed a Diploma of Urban Valuation at Auckland University College in 1948. From 1951 until his retirement in 1983, Burgess worked in property management for the Auckland Harbour Board.

== Cricket ==
=== Playing career ===
Burgess played seven first-class matches as a batsman for Auckland between 1940 and 1954. He scored 219 runs, at an average of 18.25, and with a highest score of 35 runs.

=== Administration ===
Burgess was a member of the New Zealand Cricket Council from 1962 to 1971, and was its president from 1979 to 1981. He managed the New Zealand team that toured England, India and Pakistan in 1969. In Pakistan, the team he managed won the three-match Test series 1–0. This was New Zealand's first win in a Test series.

In the 1989 New Year Honours, Burgess was appointed an Officer of the Order of the British Empire, for services to cricket.

== Death ==
Burgess died in Auckland on 3 September 2000, and his body was cremated at Purewa Crematorium.
