= Ellerslie cricket club =

Cricket club in Auckland, New Zealand

Ellerslie Cricket Club

Team information
- City: Auckland, New Zealand
- Founded: 1922; 104 years ago
- Home ground: Michaels Avenue Reserve
- Official website: ellersliecricket.co.nz/

Ellerslie Cricket Club is a New Zealand cricket club based at Michaels Avenue Reserve, in the Auckland suburb of Ellerslie. The club's early origins are murky: although the club states that it was established in 1922, records indicate a club of the same name playing matches as early as 1889. The club currently has 10 adult sides and a roster of over 150 junior players. The club's mascot is the racehorse Bonecrusher, and the club colours are Black and Gold. Through its history, the club served some well-known players, including Ole Mortensen and English Internationals, Devon Malcolm and Wilf Slack. Notable players developed at the club include Bill "Chook" Fowler, Martin Pringle and umpire Barry Frost.

== History ==
The exact date the club was founded is unclear, although papers describe a match between the club and Auckland United Cricket Club in November 1889. By 1927, the club was playing fixtures away from home, facing off against a side from Karaka.

In the early 1920s, the club was playing in the Auckland City & Suburban competition. Club historian and life member Warren Chapman claims that spin bowler Charlie Kerr turned out for Ellerslie during this time period, citing contemporaneous photographs. Chapman also notes that Rex Hooton and John Wiltshire appeared for the club during the 1950s.

By the 50s, the club was playing at The Ellerslie Domain, before purchasing a former US Army building, which became their clubrooms until 1979.

During the 1970s, the club expanded its playing roster, including the addition of Australian players Ross Hackett and Steve Chapman. Hackett previously represented the New South Wales junior cricket team during his early playing career. The club won the ACA Major Club Championship in the 1973/74 season. Following the introduction of promotion and relegation in the ACA competition grades in the 1976/77 season, successive victories in their grade saw Ellerslie reach the ACA Premiership Competition in the 1978/79 season, becoming the first club to be promoted into the premiership.

This promotion aided the club's growth in the 1980s, which included the establishment of a Women's team for the first time. Ellerslie gained the services of two respected English professionals, Wilf Slack, a left hand opening batsmen and medium pace bowler who was West Indian and Ian Gould, a wicketkeeper and right hand batsman. Both Wilf & Ian hailed from the Middlesex County Cricket Club 2nd XI but in future years would both move on and play for England. Ellerslie's first premiership match was a victory against Suburbs New Lynn, in which Peter Webb and John Reid played. In the 1983/84 season, the club won a number of accolades in the 1983/84 season, including:

- 2nd in the Major Club Championship,
- 1st in the HEC Memorial Rosebowl (best premier run rate)
- 3rd Grade won the Opotiki Cup, winning the grade,
- 4th and one day 1 pennant winners for 1st round wins
- and the highlight of the season when the Premiers won the
- Lion Breweries Cup for their One-Day Final win over Papatoetoe on the last ball of the day at Eden Park No 1.

Ellerslie went on to win its first major premiership title in the 1985/86 season with their victory in the ACA Two-Day Premiership, with a team including fast bowler Devon Malcolm. Further titles came in 1986/87, 1989/90, and 1991/92. However, retirements and financial difficulties began to affect the club's performance in the 1990s, before being relegated in the early 2000s. Despite this, the Women's team won their championship in the 2004/05 season. In 2006/07, the club's top team merged with that of University of Auckland, before reverting to a standalone team in the 2010/11 season.

== Notable players ==
The following Ellerslie players went on to make representative level:

- Shona Gilchrist (Auckland and New Zealand)
- Rob McKinlay (Auckland and New Zealand Under 20)
- Sean Tracey (Auckland and New Zealand)
- Martin Pringle (Auckland and New Zealand A)
- Bill Fowler (Auckland)
- Martin Bradley (Auckland)
- Emily Drumm (Auckland and New Zealand)
- Dean Bartlett (New Zealand Under 19 and Auckland Aces)

When Ellerslie made the premiership grade, they began to call upon English county professionals, with the following known to have played for the club:

- Wilf Slack
- Ian Gould
- Harry "Bhuna" Bliss
- Iain Anderson
- Ole Mortensen
- Bernie Maher
- Bill Fowler
- Devon Malcolm
- Harshad Patel
- Bradley Parker

Former Finance Minister Roger Douglas and umpire Doug Cowie are also thought to have played for Ellerslie.
