= International cricket in 1982–83 =

International cricket season

The 1982–83 international cricket season was from September 1982 to April 1983.

== Season overview ==
International tours
Start date	Home team	Away team	Results [Matches]			
Start date	Home team	Away team	Test	ODI	FC	LA
12 September 1982	India	Sri Lanka	0–0 [1]	3–0 [3]	—	—
20 September 1982	Pakistan	Australia	3–0 [3]	2–0 [3]	—	—
17 November 1982	Australia	England	2–1 [5]	—	—	—
3 December 1982	Pakistan	India	3–0 [6]	3–1 [4]	—	—
19 February 1983	New Zealand	England	—	3–0 [3]	—	—
23 February 1983	West Indies	India	2–0 [5]	2–1 [3]	—	—
4 March 1983	New Zealand	Sri Lanka	2–0 [2]	3–0 [3]	—	—
22 April 1983	Sri Lanka	Australia	0–1 [1]	2–0 [4]	—	—
International tournaments
Start date	Tournament				Winners	
9 January 1983	(Australia) 1982–83 Benson & Hedges World Series				Australia	
17 March 1983	(Australia) Bushfire Appeal Challenge				New Zealand	

== September ==
=== Sri Lanka in India ===
One-off Test
No.	Date	Home captain	Away captain	Venue	Result
Test 934	17–22 September	Sunil Gavaskar	Bandula Warnapura	MA Chidambaram Stadium, Chennai	Match Drawn
ODI series
No.	Date	Home captain	Away captain	Venue	Result
ODI 156	12 September	Kapil Dev	Bandula Warnapura	Gandhi Sports Complex Ground, Amritsar	India by 78 runs
ODI 157	15 September	Kapil Dev	Bandula Warnapura	Arun Jaitley Stadium, Delhi	India by 6 wickets
ODI 159	26 September	Kapil Dev	Bandula Warnapura	Karnataka State Cricket Association Stadium, Bengaluru	India by 6 wickets

=== Australia in Pakistan ===
Test Series
No.	Date	Home captain	Away captain	Venue	Result
Test 935	22–27 September	Imran Khan	Kim Hughes	National Stadium, Karachi	Pakistan by 9 wickets
Test 936	3 Sept-5 October	Imran Khan	Kim Hughes	Iqbal Stadium, Faisalabad	Pakistan by an innings and 3 runs
Test 937	14–19 October	Imran Khan	Kim Hughes	Gaddafi Stadium, Lahore	Pakistan by 9 wickets
ODI series
No.	Date	Home captain	Away captain	Venue	Result
ODI 158	20 September	Zaheer Abbas	Kim Hughes	Niaz Stadium, Hyderabad, Sindh	Pakistan by 59 runs
ODI 160	8 October	Imran Khan	Kim Hughes	Gaddafi Stadium, Lahore	Pakistan by 28 runs
ODI 161	22 October	Imran Khan	Kim Hughes	National Stadium, Karachi	No result

== November ==
=== England in Australia ===
The Ashes Test series
No.	Date	Home captain	Away captain	Venue	Result
Test 938	12–17 November	Greg Chappell	Bob Willis	WACA Ground, Perth	Match drawn
Test 939	26 Nov–1 December	Greg Chappell	Bob Willis	The Gabba, Brisbane	Australia by 7 wickets
Test 940	10–15 December	Greg Chappell	Bob Willis	Adelaide Oval, Adelaide	Australia by 8 wickets
Test 943	26–30 December	Greg Chappell	Bob Willis	Melbourne Cricket Ground, Melbourne	England by 3 runs
Test 944	2–7 January	Greg Chappell	Bob Willis	Sydney Cricket Ground, Sydney	Match drawn

== December ==
=== India in Pakistan ===
ODI series
No.	Date	Home captain	Away captain	Venue	Result
ODI 162	3 December	Imran Khan	Sunil Gavaskar	Municipal Stadium, Gujranwala	Pakistan by 14 runs
ODI 163	17 December	Imran Khan	Kapil Dev	Ibn-e-Qasim Bagh Stadium, Multan	Pakistan by 37 runs
ODI 164	31 December	Imran Khan	Sunil Gavaskar	Gaddafi Stadium, Lahore	India by 18 runs (revised)
ODI 172	21 January	Imran Khan	Sunil Gavaskar	National Stadium, Karachi	Pakistan by 8 wickets
Test Series
No.	Date	Home captain	Away captain	Venue	Result
Test 941	10–15 December	Imran Khan	Sunil Gavaskar	Gaddafi Stadium, Lahore	Match drawn
Test 942	22–27 December	Imran Khan	Sunil Gavaskar	National Stadium, Karachi	Pakistan by an innings and 86 runs
Test 945	3–8 January	Imran Khan	Sunil Gavaskar	Iqbal Stadium, Faisalabad	Pakistan by 10 wickets
Test 946	14–19 January	Imran Khan	Sunil Gavaskar	Niaz Stadium, Hyderabad, Sindh	Pakistan by an innings and 119 runs
Test 947	23–28 January	Imran Khan	Sunil Gavaskar	Gaddafi Stadium, Lahore	Match drawn
Test 948	30 Jan-4 February	Imran Khan	Sunil Gavaskar	National Stadium, Karachi	Match drawn

== January ==
=== 1982–83 Benson & Hedges World Series ===
Group stage
No.	Date	Team 1	Captain 1	Team 2	Captain 2	Venue	Result
ODI 165	9 January	Australia	Kim Hughes	New Zealand	Geoff Howarth	Melbourne Cricket Ground, Melbourne	Australia by 8 wickets
ODI 166	11 January	Australia	Kim Hughes	England	Bob Willis	Sydney Cricket Ground, Sydney	Australia by 31 runs
ODI 167	13 January	England	Bob Willis	New Zealand	Geoff Howarth	Melbourne Cricket Ground, Melbourne	New Zealand by 2 runs
ODI 168	15 January	England	Bob Willis	New Zealand	Geoff Howarth	The Gabba, Brisbane	England by 54 runs
ODI 169	16 January	Australia	Kim Hughes	England	Bob Willis	The Gabba, Brisbane	Australia by 7 wickets
ODI 170	18 January	Australia	Kim Hughes	New Zealand	Geoff Howarth	Sydney Cricket Ground, Sydney	New Zealand by 47 runs
ODI 171	20 January	England	Bob Willis	New Zealand	Geoff Howarth	Sydney Cricket Ground, Sydney	England by 8 wickets
ODI 173	22 January	Australia	Kim Hughes	New Zealand	Geoff Howarth	Melbourne Cricket Ground, Melbourne	New Zealand by 48 runs
ODI 174	23 January	Australia	Kim Hughes	England	Bob Willis	Melbourne Cricket Ground, Melbourne	Australia by 5 wickets
ODI 175	26 January	Australia	Kim Hughes	England	Bob Willis	Sydney Cricket Ground, Sydney	England by 98 runs
ODI 176	29 January	England	Bob Willis	New Zealand	Geoff Howarth	Adelaide Oval, Adelaide	New Zealand by 4 wickets
ODI 177	30 January	Australia	Kim Hughes	England	Bob Willis	Adelaide Oval, Adelaide	England by 14 runs
ODI 178	31 January	Australia	Kim Hughes	New Zealand	Geoff Howarth	Adelaide Oval, Adelaide	New Zealand by 47 runs
ODI 179	5 February	England	Bob Willis	New Zealand	Geoff Howarth	WACA Ground, Perth	New Zealand by 7 wickets
ODI 180	6 February	Australia	Kim Hughes	New Zealand	Geoff Howarth	WACA Ground, Perth	Australia by 27 runs
Finals
No.	Date	Team 1	Captain 1	Team 2	Captain 2	Venue	Result
ODI 181	9 February	Australia	Kim Hughes	New Zealand	Geoff Howarth	Sydney Cricket Ground, Sydney	Australia by 6 wickets
ODI 182	13 February	Australia	Kim Hughes	New Zealand	Geoff Howarth	Melbourne Cricket Ground, Melbourne	Australia by 149 runs

== February ==
=== England in New Zealand ===
ODI Series
No.	Date	Home captain	Away captain	Venue	Result
ODI 183	19 February	Geoff Howarth	Bob Willis	Eden Park, Auckland	New Zealand by 6 wickets
ODI 184	23 February	Geoff Howarth	Bob Willis	Basin Reserve, Wellington	New Zealand by 103 runs
ODI 185	26 February	Geoff Howarth	Bob Willis	AMI Stadium, Christchurch	New Zealand by 84 runs

=== India in the West Indies ===
Test Series
No.	Date	Home captain	Away captain	Venue	Result
Test 949	23–28 February	Clive Lloyd	Kapil Dev	Sabina Park, Kingston	West Indies by 4 wickets
Test 952	11–16 March	Clive Lloyd	Kapil Dev	Queen's Park Oval, Port of Spain	Match drawn
Test 953	31 Mar-5 April	Clive Lloyd	Kapil Dev	Bourda, Georgetown	Match drawn
Test 954	15–20 April	Clive Lloyd	Kapil Dev	Kensington Oval, Bridgetown	West Indies by 10 wickets
Test 956	28 Apr-3 May	Clive Lloyd	Kapil Dev	Antigua Recreation Ground, St. John's	Match drawn
ODI Series
No.	Date	Home captain	Away captain	Venue	Result
ODI 187	9 March	Clive Lloyd	Kapil Dev	Queen's Park Oval, Port of Spain	West Indies by 52 runs
ODI 191	29 March	Clive Lloyd	Kapil Dev	Albion Sports Complex, Albion	India by 27 runs
ODI 192	7 April	Clive Lloyd	Kapil Dev	National Cricket Stadium, St George's	West Indies by 7 wickets

== March ==
=== Sri Lanka in New Zealand ===
Test Series
No.	Date	Home captain	Away captain	Venue	Result
Test 950	4–6 March	Geoff Howarth	DS de Silva	AMI Stadium, Christchurch	New Zealand by an innings and 25 runs
Test 951	11–15 March	Geoff Howarth	DS de Silva	Basin Reserve, Wellington	New Zealand by 6 wickets
ODI Series
No.	Date	Home captain	Away captain	Venue	Result
ODI 186	2 March	Geoff Howarth	DS de Silva	Carisbrook, Dunedin	New Zealand by 65 runs
ODI 189	19 March	Geoff Howarth	DS de Silva	McLean Park, Napier	New Zealand by 7 wickets
ODI 190	20 March	Geoff Howarth	DS de Silva	Eden Park, Auckland	New Zealand by 116 runs

=== 1982-83 Bushfire Appeal Challenge ===
Bushfire Appeal Challenge ODI Match
No.	Date	Home captain	Away captain	Venue	Result
ODI 188	17 March	Kim Hughes	Geoff Howarth	Sydney Cricket Ground, Sydney	New Zealand by 14 runs

== April ==
=== Australia in Sri Lanka ===
ODI Series
No.	Date	Home captain	Away captain	Venue	Result
ODI 193	13 April	Duleep Mendis	Greg Chappell	P Saravanamuttu Stadium, Colombo	Sri Lanka by 2 wickets
ODI 194	16 April	Duleep Mendis	Greg Chappell	P Saravanamuttu Stadium, Colombo	Sri Lanka by 4 wickets
ODI 195	29 April	Duleep Mendis	Greg Chappell	Sinhalese Sports Club Ground, Colombo	No result
ODI 196	30 April	Duleep Mendis	Greg Chappell	Sinhalese Sports Club Ground, Colombo	No result
One-off Test Match
No.	Date	Home captain	Away captain	Venue	Result
Test 955	22–26 April	Duleep Mendis	Greg Chappell	Asgiriya Stadium, Kandy	Australia by an innings and 38 runs
