= International cricket in 1980–81 =

International cricket season

The 1980–81 international cricket season was from September 1980 to April 1981.

== Season overview ==
International tours
Start date	Home team	Away team	Results [Matches]			
Start date	Home team	Away team	Test	ODI	FC	LA
21 November 1980	Pakistan	West Indies	0–1 [4]	0–3 [3]	—	—
29 November 1980	Australia	New Zealand	2–0 [3]	—	—	—
2 January 1981	Australia	India	1–1 [3]	—	—	—
4 February 1981	West Indies	England	2–0 [4]	2–0 [2]	—	—
14 February 1981	New Zealand	India	1–0 [3]	2–0 [2]	—	—
International tournaments
Start date	Tournament				Winners	
23 November 1980	(Australia) 1980–81 Benson & Hedges World Series				Australia	

== November ==
=== West Indies in Pakistan ===
ODI series
No.	Date	Home captain	Away captain	Venue	Result
ODI 93	21 November	Javed Miandad	Clive Lloyd	National Stadium, Karachi	West Indies by 4 wickets
ODI 96	5 December	Javed Miandad	Clive Lloyd	Jinnah Stadium, Sialkot	West Indies by 7 wickets
ODI 101	19 December	Javed Miandad	Clive Lloyd	Gaddafi Stadium, Lahore	West Indies by 7 runs
Test series
No.	Date	Home captain	Away captain	Venue	Result
Test 886	24–29 November	Javed Miandad	Clive Lloyd	Gaddafi Stadium, Lahore	Match drawn
Test 888	8–12 December	Javed Miandad	Clive Lloyd	Iqbal Stadium, Faisalabad	West Indies by 156 runs
Test 890	22–27 December	Javed Miandad	Clive Lloyd	National Stadium, Karachi	Match drawn
Test 892	30 Dec–4 January	Javed Miandad	Clive Lloyd	Ibn-e-Qasim Bagh Stadium, Multan	Match drawn

=== 1980–81 Benson & Hedges World Series ===
Team	P	W	L	T	NR	Pts	RR
Australia	10	6	3	0	1	13	4.259
New Zealand	10	5	4	0	1	11	4.109
India	10	3	7	0	0	6	3.947

Group stage
No.	Date	Team 1	Captain 1	Team 2	Captain 2	Venue	Result
ODI 94	23 November	Australia	Greg Chappell	New Zealand	Geoff Howarth	Adelaide Oval, Adelaide	New Zealand by 3 wickets
ODI 95	25 November	Australia	Greg Chappell	New Zealand	Geoff Howarth	Sydney Cricket Ground, Sydney	Australia by 94 runs
ODI 97	6 December	Australia	Greg Chappell	India	Sunil Gavaskar	Melbourne Cricket Ground, Melbourne	India by 66 runs
ODI 98	7 December	Australia	Greg Chappell	New Zealand	Mark Burgess	Melbourne Cricket Ground, Melbourne	Australia by 4 wickets
ODI 99	9 December	India	Sunil Gavaskar	New Zealand	Mark Burgess	WACA Ground, Perth	India by 5 runs
ODI 100	18 December	Australia	Greg Chappell	India	Sunil Gavaskar	Sydney Cricket Ground, Sydney	Australia by 9 wickets
ODI 102	21 December	India	Sunil Gavaskar	New Zealand	Geoff Howarth	The Gabba, Brisbane	New Zealand by 3 wickets
ODI 103	23 December	India	Sunil Gavaskar	New Zealand	Geoff Howarth	Adelaide Oval, Adelaide	India by 6 runs
ODI 104	8 January	Australia	Greg Chappell	India	Sunil Gavaskar	Sydney Cricket Ground, Sydney	Australia by 9 wickets
ODI 105	10 January	India	Sunil Gavaskar	New Zealand	Geoff Howarth	Melbourne Cricket Ground, Melbourne	New Zealand by 10 wickets
ODI 106	11 January	Australia	Greg Chappell	India	Sunil Gavaskar	Melbourne Cricket Ground, Melbourne	Australia by 7 wickets
ODI 107	13 January	Australia	Greg Chappell	New Zealand	Geoff Howarth	Sydney Cricket Ground, Sydney	New Zealand by 1 run
ODI 108	15 January	Australia	Greg Chappell	India	Sunil Gavaskar	Sydney Cricket Ground, Sydney	Australia by 27 runs
ODI 109	18 January	India	Sunil Gavaskar	New Zealand	Geoff Howarth	The Gabba, Brisbane	New Zealand by 22 runs
ODI 110	21 January	Australia	Greg Chappell	New Zealand	Geoff Howarth	Sydney Cricket Ground, Sydney	No result
Finals
No.	Date	Team 1	Captain 1	Team 2	Captain 2	Venue	Result
ODI 111	29 January	Australia	Greg Chappell	New Zealand	Geoff Howarth	Sydney Cricket Ground, Sydney	New Zealand by 78 runs
ODI 112	31 January	Australia	Greg Chappell	New Zealand	Geoff Howarth	Melbourne Cricket Ground, Melbourne	Australia by 7 wickets
ODI 113	1 February	Australia	Greg Chappell	New Zealand	Geoff Howarth	Melbourne Cricket Ground, Melbourne	Australia by 6 runs
ODI 114	3 February	Australia	Greg Chappell	New Zealand	Geoff Howarth	Sydney Cricket Ground, Sydney	Australia by 6 wickets

=== New Zealand in Australia ===
Test series
No.	Date	Home captain	Away captain	Venue	Result
Test 887	28–30 November	Greg Chappell	Geoff Howarth	The Gabba, Brisbane	Australia by 10 wickets
Test 889	12–14 December	Greg Chappell	Mark Burgess	WACA Ground, Perth	Australia by 8 wickets
Test 891	26–30 December	Greg Chappell	Geoff Howarth	Melbourne Cricket Ground, Melbourne	Match drawn

== January ==
=== India in Australia ===
Test series
No.	Date	Home captain	Away captain	Venue	Result
Test 893	2–4 January	Greg Chappell	Sunil Gavaskar	Sydney Cricket Ground, Sydney	Australia by an innings and 4 runs
Test 894	23–27 January	Greg Chappell	Sunil Gavaskar	Adelaide Oval, Adelaide	Match drawn
Test 895	7–11 February	Greg Chappell	Sunil Gavaskar	Melbourne Cricket Ground, Melbourne	India by 59 runs

== February ==
=== England in the West Indies ===
ODI series
No.	Date	Home captain	Away captain	Venue	Result
ODI 115	4 February	Clive Lloyd	Ian Botham	Arnos Vale Ground, Kingstown	West Indies by 2 runs
ODI 118	26 February	Clive Lloyd	Ian Botham	Albion Sports Complex, Albion	West Indies by 6 wickets
Wisden Trophy Test series
No.	Date	Home captain	Away captain	Venue	Result
Test 896	13–18 February	Clive Lloyd	Ian Botham	Queen's Park Oval, Port of Spain	West Indies by an innings and 79 runs
Test 897a	28 Feb–5 March	Clive Lloyd	Ian Botham	Bourda, Georgetown	Match cancelled
Test 900	13–18 March	Clive Lloyd	Ian Botham	Kensington Oval, Bridgetown	West Indies by 298 runs
Test 901	27 Mar–1 April	Clive Lloyd	Ian Botham	Antigua Recreation Ground, St John's	Match drawn
Test 902	10–15 April	Clive Lloyd	Ian Botham	Sabina Park, Kingston	Match drawn

=== India in New Zealand ===
ODI series
No.	Date	Home captain	Away captain	Venue	Result
ODI 116	14 February	Geoff Howarth	Sunil Gavaskar	Eden Park, Auckland	New Zealand by 78 runs
ODI 117	15 February	Geoff Howarth	Gundappa Viswanath	Trust Bank Park, Hamilton	New Zealand by 57 runs
Test series
No.	Date	Home captain	Away captain	Venue	Result
Test 897	21–25 February	Geoff Howarth	Sunil Gavaskar	Basin Reserve, Wellington	New Zealand by 62 runs
Test 898	6–11 March	Geoff Howarth	Sunil Gavaskar	Lancaster Park, Christchurch	Match drawn
Test 899	13–18 March	Geoff Howarth	Sunil Gavaskar	Eden Park, Auckland	Match drawn
