= New Zealand cricket team in England in 1969 =

International cricket tour

The New Zealand cricket team toured England in the 1969 season to play a three-match Test series against England. The New Zealanders played in the second half of the English season: the England cricket team played three Test matches against the West Indies cricket team in the earlier part of the season, winning that series by 2–0 with one match drawn - see the article West Indian cricket team in England in 1969.

England won the series against the New Zealanders also by 2–0 with one match drawn. On the tour as a whole, the New Zealanders played 18 first-class matches, including the Tests, and won four of them, with three defeats. All the other matches were drawn.

After this tour the New Zealanders continued touring, playing test series in India and Pakistan till mid November 1969.

== The New Zealand team ==
The New Zealand team was captained by Graham Dowling, with Vic Pollard as vice-captain.

The full team was:

- Graham Dowling (captain)
- Vic Pollard (vice-captain)
- Mark Burgess
- Richard Collinge
- Bevan Congdon
- Bob Cunis
- Dayle Hadlee
- Brian Hastings
- Hedley Howarth
- Barry Milburn
- Dick Motz
- Bruce Murray
- Bruce Taylor
- Glenn Turner
- Ken Wadsworth
- Bryan Yuile

Seven of the side – Dowling, Pollard, Collinge, Congdon, Motz, Taylor and Yuile – had toured England with the 1965 touring party. Only Hadlee, Howarth and Wadsworth had not played Test cricket before this tour and all three of them made their Test debuts during the tour. Milburn and Yuile, both of whom had played Test cricket before this tour, did not feature in the Test matches this season.

== The Test Matches ==
=== First Test at Lord's, 24–28 July 1969 ===
24–28 July 1969
(5-day match)
Scorecard

England	v	New Zealand
190 (74.5 overs); R Illingworth 53 (131); BR Taylor 3/35 (13.5 overs)		169 (87.3 overs); GT Dowling 41 (121); BE Congdon 41 (117); R Illingworth 4/37 (22 overs)
340 (140.4 overs); JH Edrich 115 (306); BR Taylor 3/62 (25 overs)		131 (75.5 overs); GM Turner 43* (226); DL Underwood 7/32 (31 overs)

England won by 230 runs
Lord's, London
Umpires: JS Buller and A Jepson

- England won the toss and elected to bat.
- 27 July was taken as a rest day.
- The match was scheduled for five days but completed in four.
- A Ward (ENG), and DR Hadlee, HJ Howarth and KJ Wadsworth (all NZ) made their Test debuts.
- GM Turner was the first batsman to carry his bat for New Zealand in Tests.

There was little between the teams after low-scoring first innings in which only Ray Illingworth, England's captain, reached 50. In the second innings John Edrich scored 115 and shared a century opening partnership with Geoffrey Boycott. Apart from Turner, who carried his bat for a dour 43, New Zealand did not cope well with Derek Underwood's left-arm spin and his 7-32 gave England a comfortable victory.

=== Second Test at Trent Bridge, 7–12 August 1969 ===
7–12 August 1969
(5-day match)
Scorecard

New Zealand	v	England
294 (127.5 overs); BF Hastings 83 (215); A Ward 4/61 (23 overs)		451/8d (155 overs); JH Edrich 155 (330); DR Hadlee 4/88 (25 overs)
66/1 (23 overs); BAG Murray 40* (68); R Illingworth 1/3 (2 overs)

Match drawn
Trent Bridge, Nottingham
Umpires: CS Elliott and AEG Rhodes

- New Zealand won the toss and elected to bat.
- 10 August was taken as a rest day.
- There were only 20 minutes play on the third day and less than an hour's play on the final day.

Almost all of the third and fifth days were lost to the weather, so that New Zealand comfortably saved the game in spite of a big deficit on first innings. For New Zealand, Congdon (66) and Hastings (83) put on 150 for the third wicket, at the time a New Zealand record in England. Edrich (155) and Phil Sharpe (111) responded with a second wicket partnership of 246.

=== Third Test at The Oval, 21–26 August 1969 ===
21–26 August 1965
(5-day match)
Scorecard

New Zealand	v	England
150 (82.3 overs); GM Turner 53 (164); DL Underwood 6/41 (26 overs)		242 (98 overs); JH Edrich 68 (174); BR Taylor 4/47 (21 overs)
229 (116.3 overs); BF Hastings 61 (215); DL Underwood 6/60 (38.3 overs)		138/2 (52.3 overs); MH Denness 55* (135); RS Cunis 2/36 (11 overs)

England won by 8 wickets
The Oval, London
Umpires: AE Fagg and TW Spencer

- New Zealand won the toss and elected to bat.
- 24 August was taken as a rest day.
- MH Denness (ENG) made his Test debut.

Underwood undermined the New Zealand batting, taking six wickets in each innings to finish the series with 24 wickets at an average of 9.16 runs each. Turner made a three-hour 53 in New Zealand's first innings, and Hastings a three-and-a-half-hour 61 in the second, but none of the other batsmen managed more than 30. Edrich made 68 in England's first innings and Mike Denness in his first Test match took England home on the last afternoon with an unbeaten 55. The match was stretched out to the full five days because of constant showers.

== Other First-Class Matches ==
A total of 15 other first-class matches were played between the end of June and the middle of September. A three-day game with D. H. Robins' XI at Eastbourne in mid-June was not counted as first-class.

The New Zealanders recorded victories over Scotland, the Minor Counties, Warwickshire and T. N. Pearce's XI. Apart from the defeats in the Test matches, their only other defeat on tour was by Essex by the narrow margin of 15 runs. The 10 other games, all with first-class counties, were drawn.

== Annual reviews ==
- Playfair Cricket Annual 1970
- Wisden Cricketers' Almanack 1970
