= Barry Milburn =

New Zealand cricketer (born 1943)

Personal information
- Full name: Barry Douglas Milburn
- Born: 24 November 1943 (age 82); Dunedin, New Zealand
- Batting: Right-handed
- Role: Wicket-keeper
- Relatives: Rowan Milburn (daughter)

International information
- National side: New Zealand (1969)
- Test debut (cap 117): 27 February 1969 v West Indies
- Last Test: 13 March 1969 v West Indies

Domestic team information
- Years: Team
- 1963/64–1982/83: Otago

Career statistics
Competition	Test	FC	LA
Matches	3	75	8
Runs scored	8	737	30
Batting average	8.00	11.51	7.50
100s/50s	0/0	1/0	0/0
Top score	4*	103	10
Catches/stumpings	6/2	176/19	14/5
- Source: Cricinfo, 1 April 2017

Barry Douglas Milburn (born 24 November 1943) is a former New Zealand cricketer who played three Test matches for New Zealand in 1969.

== Cricket career ==
Milburn was born at Dunedin in 1943 and educated at King's High School in the city. A wicket-keeper and lower-order right-handed batsman, he played first-class cricket for Otago from 1963–64 to 1982–83.

He was one of a succession of New Zealand Test wicketkeepers of modest batting ability in the mid to late 1960s, and was first choice for only one Test series, the three matches in New Zealand against the West Indies in 1968-69 when, like his immediate predecessor Roy Harford, he batted at number 11. Milburn also toured England in 1969 and India and Pakistan in 1969–70, but Ken Wadsworth, a better batsman, played as the principal keeper on both tours. An injury in the later stages of the England tour did not help Milburn's cause at a time when Wadsworth was struggling for runs.

Milburn dropped out of first-class cricket after the 1973–74 season, but returned to play for Otago in 1980–81. He scored a century in his comeback match against Wellington, when he went in as nightwatchman, and Otago went on to win by one wicket. His next highest score in a 19-year career was only 36. He finally retired after the 1982–83 season.

== Later life ==
Milburn was the wicket-keeping coach at the New Zealand Cricket Academy for five years. He was also a hockey player and umpire in Otago.

Later Milburn lived in Queensland for 18 years, managing apartment buildings. He retired and returned to New Zealand in 2016, to live in Mosgiel, near Dunedin. He has three daughters and lives with his wife Jen. Their daughter Rowan kept wicket for both the Netherlands and New Zealand at international level in the 2000s.
