= David Trist =

New Zealand cricketer (1947–2025)

Personal information
- Full name: David George Trist
- Born: 22 September 1947; Christchurch, New Zealand
- Died: 29 May 2025 (aged 77); Christchurch, New Zealand
- Batting: Left-handed
- Bowling: Right-arm fast-medium

Domestic team information
- Years: Team
- 1969/70–1977/78: Canterbury

Career statistics
Competition	First-class	List A
Matches	24	6
Runs scored	267	19
Batting average	9.88	9.50
100s/50s	0/0	0/0
Top score	41*	16
Balls bowled	4,176	348
Wickets	57	10
Bowling average	28.24	18.70
5 wickets in innings	1	0
10 wickets in match	0	0
Best bowling	5/31	3/20
Catches/stumpings	13/–	3/–
Medal record
Men's cricket
Representing New Zealand as Coach
Winner	2000 ICC KnockOut Trophy
- Source: Cricket Archive, 8 June 2025

David George Trist (22 September 1947 – 29 May 2025) was a New Zealand cricketer and cricket coach. He was coach of the New Zealand national cricket team from 1999 to 2001, and led the team to victory in the 2000 ICC KnockOut Trophy, the first title won by the country.

== Biography ==
Trist was born at Christchurch on 22 September 1947 and educated at Christchurch Boys' High School. A right-arm fast-medium bowler, he played 24 first-class and six List A games between the 1968–69 and 1977–78 seasons, most of them for Canterbury. Before his Cantebrury debut in December 1969 he had played five first-class matches, one for the South Island, one for New Zealand under-23s, and three for New Zealand during their tour of India and Pakistan in 1969–70 as a replacement for Dick Motz. He took a total of 57 first-class wickets and scored scored 267 runs.

After retiring as a player, Trist became a cricket coach and led Eastern Province to victory in the 1988–89 Currie Cup. He also had spells as coach of Hong Kong (at the 1997 ICC Trophy) and the Netherlands. Following New Zealand's tour of England in 1999, Trist replaced Steve Rixon as coach of his home country. Under Trist, New Zealand won the 2000 ICC KnockOut Trophy in Nairobi, New Zealand's first world title.

Trist died at Christchurch on 29 May 2025, at the age of 77.
