= International cricket in 1978 =

International cricket season

The 1978 International cricket season was from May 1978 to August 1978.

== Season overview ==
International tours
Start date	Home team	Away team	Results [Matches]			
Start date	Home team	Away team	Test	ODI	FC	LA
24 May 1978	England	Pakistan	2–0 [3]	2–0 [2]	—	—
15 July 1978	England	New Zealand	3–0 [3]	2–0 [2]	—	—

== May ==
=== Pakistan in England ===
Prudential Trophy ODI series
No.	Date	Home captain	Away captain	Venue	Result
ODI 50	24–25 May	Geoff Boycott	Wasim Bari	Old Trafford Cricket Ground, Manchester	England by 132 runs
ODI 51	26 May	Bob Willis	Wasim Bari	Kennington Oval, London	England by 94 runs
Test series
No.	Date	Home captain	Away captain	Venue	Result
Test 825	1–5 June	Mike Brearley	Wasim Bari	Edgbaston Cricket Ground, Birmingham	England by an innings and 57 runs
Test 826	15–19 June	Mike Brearley	Wasim Bari	Lord's, London	England by an innings and 120 runs
Test 827	29 Jun–4 July	Mike Brearley	Wasim Bari	Headingley, Leeds	Match drawn

== July ==
=== New Zealand in England ===
Prudential Trophy ODI series
No.	Date	Home captain	Away captain	Venue	Result
ODI 52	15 July	Mike Brearley	Mark Burgess	North Marine Road Ground, Scarborough	England by 19 runs
ODI 53	17 July	Mike Brearley	Mark Burgess	Old Trafford Cricket Ground, Manchester	England by 126 runs
Test series
No.	Date	Home captain	Away captain	Venue	Result
Test 828	27 July–1 August	Mike Brearley	Mark Burgess	Kennington Oval, London	England by 7 wickets
Test 829	10–14 August	Mike Brearley	Mark Burgess	Trent Bridge, Nottingham	England by an innings and 119 runs
Test 830	28–24 August	Mike Brearley	Mark Burgess	Lord's, London	England by 7 wickets
