= Sean Tracy =

New Zealand cricketer (born 1963)

Personal information
- Full name: Sean Robert Tracy
- Born: 7 June 1963 (age 63); Auckland, New Zealand
- Batting: Right-handed
- Bowling: Right-arm fast-medium
- Role: Bowler

Domestic team information
- Years: Team
- 1982/83–1984/85: Auckland
- 1985/86: Canterbury
- 1990/91: Otago

Career statistics
Competition	First-class	List A
Matches	30	23
Runs scored	124	40
Batting average	4.76	6.66
100s/50s	0/0	0/0
Top score	33	10*
Balls bowled	4,047	1,114
Wickets	81	22
Bowling average	28.59	33.72
5 wickets in innings	3	0
10 wickets in match	0	0
Best bowling	5/19	4/16
Catches/stumpings	7/–	5/–
- Source: CricInfo, 30 January 2024

Sean Robert Tracy (born 7 June 1963) is a former New Zealand cricketer who played for Auckland, Canterbury and Otago in a top-level career which lasted from the 1982–83 season until 1990–91.

Tracy was born at Auckland in 1963 and educated at Auckland Grammar School. A right-arm fast bowler, he played in age-group sides for both Auckland and New Zealand during the 1981–82 season before making his senior representative debut for Auckland the following season whilst regular bowlers Martin Snedden and Gary Troup were touring Australia with the New Zealand national side. In five matches he took 12 wickets, although "he impressed with his pace" during the season and was considered "a handful with the ball" At the end of the season he toured Australia with a New Zealand Emerging Players side.

Following his debut season, Tracy spent the 1983 winter playing league cricket in the west of England on a cricket scholarship with Gloucestershire County Cricket Club. He played for the county's Second XI and made a single first-class appearance against the touring New Zealand national side which was touring the country at the time. He took the wickets of leading batsmen Bruce Edgar and Jeff Crowe, and with bowlers Geoff Howarth and Martin Snedden carrying injuries, Tracy was called into the tour party after the second Test match. He had impressed the selectors with his pace, but played in only two of the remaining matches, taking two wickets against Hampshire before taking five wickets for 29 runs (5/29) in 6.3 overs against DB Close's XI at Scarborough in the final tour match. This performance, his first five-wicket haul, led to Wisden suggesting that he "gave promise that he might answer some of New Zealand's bowling problems in the future" in its review of the tour.

Although he toured Zimbabwe with a Young New Zealand side in 1984–85, playing in two first-class matches, he never played for the full national side and after three seasons playing for Auckland Tracy moved to play for Canterbury in 1985–86. Considered over-reliant on his pace and unable to "get enough swing or movement off the pitch to worry topliners consistently", he played Second XI matches for Auckland during the 1987–88 and 1988–89 seasons before playing one final season of top-level cricket for Otago in 1990–91. In a total of 30 first-class matches Tracy took 81 wickets. In 23 List A matches he added a further 22.

Tracy played club cricket for Howick-Pakuranga and Ellerslie cricket clubs in the Auckland area and was a rugby union fullback for Waimate in South Canterbury. He worked as a school teacher.
