= New Zealand cricket team in Pakistan in 1969–70 =

International cricket tour

The New Zealand national cricket team toured Pakistan in October and November 1969 and played a three-match Test series against the Pakistan national cricket team. New Zealand won the Test series 1–0. New Zealand were captained by Graham Dowling and Pakistan by Intikhab Alam.

New Zealand had just finished their Test campaigns in England and India.

This was the first ever series win by New Zealand after almost 40 years and 30 consecutive winless series.

The last match of the series was played at the Dacca Stadium in Dacca, East Pakistan (present-day Bangladesh). This was the last Test match played in East Pakistan before the Bangladesh Liberation War of 1971, after which Test cricket did not return to the country until the Bangladesh national cricket team made its Test debut in 2000 against India.

== Test series summary ==
=== First Test ===
24–27 October 1969
(4-day match)
Scorecard

| Pakistan | v | New Zealand |
| 220 (97.2 overs); Sadiq Mohammad 69; HJ Howarth 5/80 (33 overs) | | 274 (85.1 overs); DR Hadlee 56; Mohammad Nazir 7/99 (30.1 overs) |
| 283/8d (134.4 overs); Younis Ahmed 62; RS Cunis 2/38 (15.4 overs) | | 112/5 (63 overs); MG Burgess 45; Pervez Sajjad 5/33 (24 overs) |

Match drawn
National Stadium, Karachi
Umpires: Idrees Baig and Munawar Hussain

- Pakistan won the toss and elected to bat.
- Mohammad Nazir, Sadiq Mohammad, Younis Ahmed and Zaheer Abbas (all PAK) made their Test debuts.

=== Second Test ===
30 October–2 November 1969
(4-day match)
Scorecard

| Pakistan | v | New Zealand |
| 114 (67.4 overs); Mushtaq Mohammad 25; V Pollard 3/27 (20 overs) | | 241 (115 overs); BAG Murray 90; Pervez Sajjad 7/74 (40 overs) |
| 208 (105.5 overs); Shafqat Rana 95; DR Hadlee 3/27 (17 overs) | | 82/5 (32.3 overs); MG Burgess 29*; Mohammad Nazir 3/19 (12.3 overs) |

New Zealand won by 5 wickets
Lahore Stadium, Lahore
Umpires: Akhtar Hussain and Umar Khan

- Pakistan won the toss and elected to bat.

=== Third Test ===
8–11 November 1969
(4-day match)
Scorecard

| New Zealand | v | Pakistan |
| 273 (166.3 overs); GM Turner 110; Intikhab Alam 5/91 (56 overs) | | 290/7d (101.1 overs); Asif Iqbal 92; HJ Howarth 4/85 (33.1 overs) |
| 200 (101.4 overs); MG Burgess 119*; Intikhab Alam 5/91 (39.4 overs) | | 51/4 (15 overs); Javed Burki 17*; RS Cunis 4/21 (7 overs) |

Match drawn
Bangabandhu National Stadium, Dhaka, Bangladesh
Umpires: Daud Khan and Shujauddin

- New Zealand won the toss and elected to bat.
- Aftab Baloch (PAK) made his Test debut.
