= George Wallace (New Zealand cricketer) =

New Zealand cricketer

Personal information
- Full name: George Frederick Wallace
- Born: 31 July 1913; Auckland, New Zealand
- Died: 19 September 1997 (aged 84); Auckland, New Zealand
- Batting: Right-handed
- Relatives: Merv Wallace (brother); Gregory Wallace (nephew); Ryan Fox (great-nephew)

Domestic team information
- Years: Team
- 1936/37–1945/46: Auckland
- Source: ESPNcricinfo, 25 June 2016

George Frederick Wallace (31 July 1913 – 19 September 1997) was a New Zealand cricketer. He played six first-class matches for Auckland between 1936 and 1946. His younger brother Merv Wallace captained the New Zealand cricket team in the 1950s.
