= Walter Hadlee =

New Zealand cricketer (1915–2006)

Walter Hadlee CBE
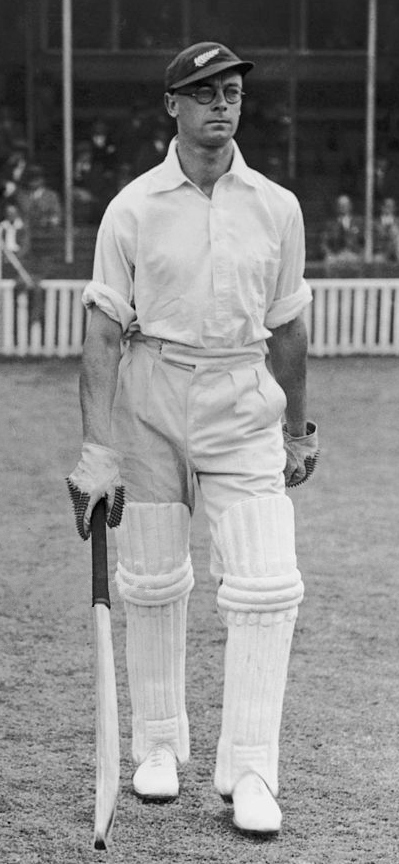
- Hadlee at the 3rd Test against England, the Oval, 1937

Personal information
- Born: 4 June 1915; Lincoln, Canterbury, New Zealand
- Died: 29 September 2006 (aged 91); Christchurch, New Zealand
- Batting: Right-handed
- Bowling: Right-arm medium

International information
- National side: New Zealand (1937–1951)
- Test debut (cap 29): 26 June 1937 v England
- Last Test: 24 March 1951 v England

Domestic team information
- Years: Team
- 1933/34–1944/45: Canterbury
- 1945/46–1946/47: Otago
- 1947/48–1951/52: Canterbury

Career statistics
Competition	Test	First-class
Matches	11	117
Runs scored	543	7,523
Batting average	30.16	40.44
100s/50s	1/2	18/31
Top score	116	198
Balls bowled	0	632
Wickets	–	6
Bowling average	–	48.83
5 wickets in innings	–	0
10 wickets in match	–	0
Best bowling	–	3/14
Catches/stumpings	6/–	70/–
- Source: Cricinfo, 1 April 2017

Walter Arnold Hadlee CBE (4 June 1915 – 29 September 2006) was a New Zealand cricketer and Test match captain. He played domestic first-class cricket for Canterbury and Otago. Three of his five sons, Sir Richard, Dayle and Barry played cricket for New Zealand. The Chappell–Hadlee Trophy, which is competed for by ODI teams from New Zealand and Australia is named in honour of the Hadlee family and the Australian Chappell family.

Hadlee captained one of New Zealand's most highly regarded teams, the 1949 team which toured England in an era when New Zealand had yet to win a Test. As an administrator, he guided New Zealand cricket in the mid-1970s during years of increasing professionalism, the Kerry Packer threat and the sporting boycott of South Africa.

He was awarded the Bert Sutcliffe Medal in 2001.

== Early life ==
Hadlee was born in Lincoln, Canterbury. His father was a blacksmith with 9 siblings, whose parents arrived in Dunedin in 1869. The young Hadlee fell in love with cricket when he was about 10. He read cricket history avidly, kept scorebooks of all the big games at Lancaster Park, and practised assiduously. Though he initially appeared awkward, at Christchurch Boys' High School, he also played hockey and rugby, and developed into a punishing batsman, particularly strong on the drive. He finished his school career by captaining the first eleven. He trained as a chartered accountant.

== First-class career ==
In his first season for Canterbury (1933–34) Hadlee averaged over 50, and 94 in his second; he eventually scored 10 centuries for the province. Hadlee played 44 matches for Canterbury before retiring in 1951–52, having scored 3,183 runs at an average of 43.60. His highest score was 194 not out.

After playing against touring MCC teams, Hadlee made his Test debut against England at Lord's in 1937, only 11 years after New Zealand joined the Imperial Cricket Conference, and 7 years after it played in its first Test match. Tall and elegant, he was known as an upright and attacking opening batsman. He missed the opportunity to play during the Second World War. His short sight prevented him from joining the Armed Forces.

He scored 198 for Otago against the touring Australian team in 1945–46, and was appointed captain of New Zealand for the first Test in peacetime, against Australia that year. On a rain-affected pitch in Wellington, New Zealand were bowled out for 42 and 54, losing by an innings, and did not play Australia again in Tests until 1973–74.

Although he made 1,225 runs in 1937, including an innings of 93 in the Test at Old Trafford which ended after he trod on his stumps, it was his captaincy of the 1949 New Zealand team to England that proved to be the pinnacle of his playing career. The 1949 team is still cited as one of the finest New Zealand has sent abroad and there were some illustrious names in the team, including Bert Sutcliffe, Martin Donnelly, John Reid, Jack Cowie, Tom Burtt, Harry Cave, Merv Wallace, Verdun Scott, Geoff Rabone and Frank Mooney. During the tour, Hadlee scored 1,439 runs, averaging 36 an innings, with two centuries. Out of 35 matches, his team lost just one, to Oxford University, on a rain-damaged pitch, and drew the four-Test series 0–0.

As leading English writer John Woodcock noted: "Hadlee was a courageous and enterprising batsman, a popular and successful captain who played his cricket in the sporting manner usually associated with his country". John Arlott called him a "strategic commander of real ability".

In all, Hadlee played 19 innings in 11 Tests, scoring 543 runs at an average of 30.16. He was never dismissed in Tests in single figures. His last Test was against England in Wellington in 1950–51. His only Test century, 116, came against England at Christchurch in 1946–47 as an opening batsman. He retired from first-class cricket in 1952. He continued playing senior club cricket in Christchurch for another 15 years, eventually scoring a record 15,391 club runs.

In his first-class career, he scored 7523 runs from 117 matches, averaging 40.44 and notching up 18 centuries.

== Cricket administration ==
Hadlee was a national selector, a New Zealand team manager, and a member of the management committee and Board of Control of New Zealand cricket from 1950 to 1983. He was chairman from 1973 to 1978 and president from 1981 to 1983.

He was a member of the "No Maoris, No Tour" protest movement, protesting against the All Blacks tour to South Africa in 1960. He was later blacklisted by the South African Non-Racial Olympic Committee (SANROC) for writing an article in the 1982 Wisden which called for South Africa be permitted to play international cricket. In the 1950 King's Birthday Honours, Hadlee was appointed an Officer of the Order of the British Empire for services in the field of sport, and he was promoted to Commander of the same order, for services to cricket, in the 1978 Queen's Birthday Honours.

== Private life ==
Hadlee married Lilla Monro in 1940. They had met on the ship to England in 1937. They had five sons. He took great pride that three of his five sons represented New Zealand: Dayle, a Test fast bowler, and Barry, a batsman in the inaugural 1975 Cricket World Cup, were eclipsed by Richard, who became a leading all-rounder: he took 431 Test wickets – a world record at the time – and 1,490 first class wickets, and also finished with a Test batting average of 27.16. Richard was knighted for services to cricket. A fourth son, Martin, played club cricket in Christchurch.

When asked to vote, for the 2000 edition of Wisden, for his choice of the five cricketers of the 20th century, he included his son Richard, confessing it was "embarrassing ... But there's a job to be done. I will cite the bare facts." He had considered Dennis Lillee for his selection, but found Richard's test match performance put him marginally ahead.

He published an autobiography, Innings of a Lifetime, in 1993.

In later life, he enjoyed lawn bowls. He died, aged 91, at the Princess Margaret Hospital in Christchurch, reportedly from a stroke, some six weeks after hip replacement surgery.

On 20 January 2017, Walter Hadlee's son, Sir Richard Hadlee, spoke about a project he has undertaken about his father 's 1949 England tour as New Zealand captain. He shared how Walter Hadlee was an important figure in his life.

Sporting positions
Preceded by Curly Page	New Zealand national cricket captain 1945/6-1950/1	Succeeded by Bert Sutcliffe
