= Gregory Wallace =

New Zealand cricketer (born 1950)

Personal information
- Full name: Gregory Mervyn Wallace
- Born: 21 September 1950 (age 76); Auckland, New Zealand
- Relatives: Merv Wallace (father); George Wallace (uncle); Grant Fox (brother-in-law); Ryan Fox (nephew)
- Source: ESPNcricinfo, 25 June 2016

Gregory Mervyn Wallace (born 21 September 1950) is a New Zealand former cricketer. He played one first-class and one List A match for Auckland.

== See also ==
- List of Auckland representative cricketers
