= Llorne Howell =

New Zealand cricketer (born 1972)

Personal information
- Full name: Llorne Gregory Howell
- Born: 8 July 1972 (age 54); Napier, Hawke's Bay, New Zealand
- Batting: Right-handed
- Bowling: Right-arm medium

International information
- National side: New Zealand (1998)
- ODI debut (cap 104): 4 February 1998 v Zimbabwe
- Last ODI: 21 April 1998 v Australia

Career statistics
Competition	ODI	FC	LA
Matches	12	83	130
Runs scored	287	3,586	3,592
Batting average	23.19	28.23	31.23
100s/50s	0/4	3/20	5/27
Top score	68	181	134*
Balls bowled	–	150	102
Wickets	–	0	2
Bowling average	–	–	53.00
5 wickets in innings	–	–	0
10 wickets in match	–	–	0
Best bowling	–	–	2/35
Catches/stumpings	2/–	48/–	32/–
- Source: Cricinfo, 2 May 2017

Llorne Gregory Howell (born 8 July 1972) is a former New Zealand international cricketer. His career started well, with Howell captaining the New Zealand national under-19 cricket team Under-19 side in Youth Tests and One Day Internationals in 1990/91 and 1991/92.

Howell went on to make his senior One Day International debut in Sharjah in 1998, but he never played Tests as his style of batting was considered unsuitable for the longer-form game. An unexpected serious shoulder surgery meant he played only 12 ODIs.
