= Stephen Cunis =

New Zealand cricketer

Personal information
- Full name: Stephen John Cunis
- Born: 17 January 1978 (age 48); Whakatāne, New Zealand
- Batting: Right-handed
- Bowling: Right-arm fast-medium
- Relatives: Bob Cunis (father)

Domestic team information
- Years: Team
- 1998/99–2005/06: Canterbury

Career statistics
Competition	First-class	List A
Matches	32	55
Runs scored	582	199
Batting average	15.72	12.43
100s/50s	0/2	0/0
Top score	64*	33
Balls bowled	5,021	2,740
Wickets	79	68
Bowling average	28.68	26.33
5 wickets in innings	3	0
10 wickets in match	0	0
Best bowling	5/59	4/37
Catches/stumpings	9/–	6/–
- Source: Cricinfo, 6 December 2019

Stephen John Cunis (born 17 January 1978) is a former New Zealand cricketer who played first-class and List A cricket for Canterbury between 1999 and 2006. He has since been a cricket coach and administrator.

== Life and career ==
Stephen Cunis is the son of the New Zealand Test cricketer Bob Cunis. He grew up in Northland and attended Whangarei Boys' High School. After moving to Christchurch in 1998 he played and coached at the St Albans Cricket Club for 14 years.

A fast-medium bowler and useful lower-order batsman, Cunis was a frequent member of the Canterbury team from 2000–01 to 2004–05. His best first-class bowling figures were 5 for 59 against Otago in 2000–01. His highest score was 64 not out against Wellington in 2003–04, when he and Chris Harris added an unbroken stand of 96 for the ninth wicket.

Cunis taught as a primary school teacher in Christchurch for 10 years. He coached extensively in Christchurch and was also the assistant coach of the New Zealand women's team. He and his family moved to Northland after the February 2011 earthquakes severely damaged his house and land.

As of 2019, Cunis he works full-time for Northland Cricket Association as the General Manager. Before taking this position he had been the Northland coach for eight years. He and his wife Kara have three sons.
