= Barry Hadlee =

New Zealand cricketer (born 1941)

Personal information
- Full name: Barry George Hadlee
- Born: 14 December 1941 (age 84); Christchurch, Canterbury, New Zealand
- Batting: Right-handed
- Role: Batsman

International information
- National side: New Zealand (1975)
- ODI debut (cap 18): 8 March 1975 v England
- Last ODI: 11 June 1975 v England

Domestic team information
- Years: Team
- 1961/62–1980/81: Canterbury

Career statistics
Competition	ODI	FC	LA
Matches	2	84	16
Runs scored	26	4,540	297
Batting average	26.00	31.52	21.21
100s/50s	0/0	6/24	0/0
Top score	19	163*	45
Balls bowled	0	312	0
Wickets	–	4	–
Bowling average	–	53.00	–
5 wickets in innings	–	0	–
10 wickets in match	–	0	–
Best bowling	–	2/28	–
Catches/stumpings	0/–	35/–	5/–
- Source: Cricinfo, 2 February 2017

Barry George Hadlee (born 14 December 1941) is a former cricketer from New Zealand. He was a right-handed opening batsman. In a first-class career lasting from 1961–62 to 1980–81, he represented Canterbury 84 times.

== Family ==
Hadlee was born in Christchurch, Canterbury, New Zealand. He is the brother of fellow national cricketers Dayle Hadlee and Sir Richard Hadlee and the eldest son of Walter Hadlee.

== Domestic career ==
His most consistent form came late in his career. His most productive season was 1975–76, when he scored 582 runs at 44.76. He hit his highest score, 163 not out, in his final season against Otago.

== International career ==
In 1975, Hadlee was called into the New Zealand team and played two One Day Internationals, one of them at the 1975 Cricket World Cup.
