= Stephen Lynch (New Zealand cricketer) =

New Zealand cricketer (born 1976)

Personal information
- Full name: Stephen Michael Lynch
- Born: 18 February 1976 (age 50); Auckland, New Zealand
- Batting: Right-handed
- Relatives: Robert Lynch (brother)

Domestic team information
- Years: Team
- 1995/96–1999/00: Auckland

Career statistics
Competition	First-class	List A
Matches	24	35
Runs scored	1,263	568
Batting average	32.38	18.93
100s/50s	0/10	0/4
Top score	94	65
Catches/stumpings	19/–	8/–
- Source: CricketArchive, 21 January 2011

Stephen Michael Lynch (born 18 February 1976) is a New Zealand former cricketer.

== Early life and education ==
Born at Auckland in 1976 and educated at Auckland Grammar School, Lynch played a total of 24 first-class and 35 List Amatches, the majority for Auckland between the 1995–96 and 1999–00 seasons.

== Career ==
In 1993–94, Lynch captained the New Zealand under-19 team, drawing three under-19 Test matches against Pakistan under-19s and played for a New Zealand XI in 1995–96 and the New Zealand Academy team.
