= Peter Webb (New Zealand cricketer) =

New Zealand cricketer

Personal information
- Full name: Peter Neil Webb
- Born: 13 July 1957 (age 69); Auckland, New Zealand
- Batting: Right-handed
- Role: Batsman, occasional wicket-keeper

International information
- National side: New Zealand (1980-1984)
- Test debut (cap 145): 8 February 1980 v West Indies
- Last Test: 22 February 1980 v West Indies
- ODI debut (cap 43): 9 January 1983 v Australia
- Last ODI: 25 February 1984 v England

Domestic team information
- Years: Team
- 1976/77–1986/87: Auckland

Career statistics
Competition	Test	ODI	FC	LA
Matches	2	5	75	42
Runs scored	11	38	3,671	846
Batting average	3.66	9.50	33.07	21.15
100s/50s	0/0	0/0	5/23	0/5
Top score	5	10*	136	84
Balls bowled	–	–	293	6
Wickets	–	–	4	0
Bowling average	–	–	44.25	–
5 wickets in innings	–	–	0	–
10 wickets in match	–	–	0	–
Best bowling	–	–	2/34	–
Catches/stumpings	2/–	3/–	53/2	10/1
- Source: Cricinfo, 4 February 2017

Peter Neil Webb (born 14 July 1957) is a former New Zealand cricketer who played in two Test matches and five One Day Internationals from 1980 to 1984.

== Career ==
Webb played for Te Atatu Cricket Club as a youngster, scoring his first century for the Te Atatu 4th Grade men's side against University when aged 14, followed by Suburbs New Lynn Cricket Club. He played Brabin Shield under-20 at 16 years of age, Rothmans under-23 at 17 years of age and first-class cricket for Auckland at 19 years of age. He was first selected to appear for Auckland in January 1977 as a middle-order batsman, and Auckland won the match by 88 runs although Webb did not bat or bowl or take a catch. He made 136, the highest of his five first-class centuries, against Wellington in 1980–81, when Auckland won by 170 runs.

After a moderate Shell Trophy season in which he scored 357 runs at an average of 25.50, Webb was selected to play the first two Tests against the West Indies in New Zealand in 1979-80. He was not personally successful, but New Zealand won the first Test and drew the second, and went on to win the three-Test series one-nil.

He kept wicket occasionally in both one day and first-class cricket. He played in Auckland's one-day championship-winning teams in 1978–79, 1980–81 and 1983–84. He also achieved selection for New Zealand representative junior teams. He toured Australia with the New Zealand team in 1982-83, playing in four of the one-day internationals as wicket-keeper.

Webb played many seasons with English club teams including Brighton and Hove CC, Elland CC, Dulwich CC and Stafford CC, playing as a professional for Elland and Stafford. He also made one appearance in 1981 for the Staffordshire Minor County side. Webb was the first of many young Auckland cricketers to benefit from the support of the Auckland Cricket Society which enabled him and many others to travel to England and improve their skills.

In 1986 Webb attended Marlborough College in Wiltshire as part of a scholarship to study sports turf maintenance under the supervision of Peter Mansfield. Webb attained the Institute of Groundsman NTC and NPC (UK) in 1986; he was the first overseas candidate to sit and pass these qualifications. Webb went on to be head groundsman at Reading Blue Coat School and at Reed's School in Surrey. At both these schools he also coached the cricket team. In New Zealand Webb worked at Eden Park, Auckland, as a ground staff member, and later at Melville Park in Auckland where he was head groundsman.
