= V. Rajagopal =

Indian cricket umpire (born 1927)

Personal information
- Born: 1 July 1927

Umpiring information
- Tests umpired: 1 (1969)
- Source: Cricinfo, 15 July 2013

V. Rajagopal (born 1 July 1927) is an Indian former cricket umpire. He stood in one Test match, India vs. New Zealand, in 1969.

== See also ==
- List of Test cricket umpires
- New Zealand cricket team in India in 1969–70
