= Bob Cunis =

New Zealand cricketer (1941–2008)

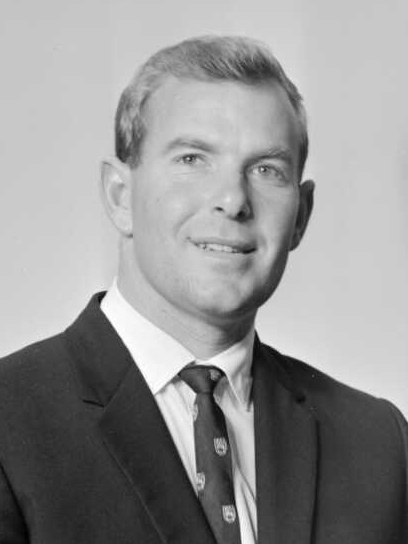
- Cunis in 1967

Personal information
- Full name: Robert Smith Cunis
- Born: 5 January 1941; Whangārei, New Zealand
- Died: 9 August 2008 (aged 67); Ruakākā, New Zealand
- Batting: Right-handed
- Bowling: Right-arm fast-medium
- Role: Bowler
- Relatives: Stephen Cunis (son)

International information
- National side: New Zealand (1964–1972)
- Test debut (cap 101): 13 March 1964 v South Africa
- Last Test: 20 April 1972 v West Indies

Domestic team information
- Years: Team
- 1960/61–1974/75: Auckland
- 1975/76–1976/77: Northern Districts

Career statistics
Competition	Test	FC	LA
Matches	20	132	15
Runs scored	295	1,849	46
Batting average	12.82	16.50	11.50
100s/50s	0/1	1/6	0/0
Top score	51	111	18
Balls bowled	4,250	26,698	728
Wickets	51	386	17
Bowling average	37.00	26.65	22.41
5 wickets in innings	1	18	0
10 wickets in match	0	2	0
Best bowling	6/76	7/29	3/15
Catches/stumpings	1/–	30/–	3/–
- Source: Cricinfo, 30 January 2017

Robert Smith Cunis (5 January 1941 – 9 August 2008) was a New Zealand cricketer and cricket coach. He played 20 Test matches for New Zealand as a pace bowler between 1964 and 1972. A sturdily-built fast-medium bowler, Cunis played for Auckland from 1960–61 to 1973–74, and for Northern Districts in 1975–76 and 1976–77. He later coached the New Zealand team from 1987 to 1990.

== Early life and family ==
Born in Whangārei on 5 January 1941, Cunis was the son of Horace and Helen Forsyth Cunis. From 1952 to 1957, he was educated at Whangārei Boys' High School, where he was prominent as a sportsman, playing for the school's 1st XI cricket and 1st XV rugby union teams and representing the school in swimming. He went on to study at teachers' training college, and became a schoolteacher.

Cunis married Jeanette McMillan, and the couple had three children, including Stephen, who played cricket for Canterbury between 1998 and 2006.

== Cricket career ==
=== Player ===
==== 1960s ====
On his first-class debut in December 1960, Cunis took 6 for 72 and 2 for 26 against Northern Districts to help Auckland to an eight-wicket victory. In 1961–62 he took 27 wickets at 14.18, including 2 for 31 and 7 for 29 in the victory over Central Districts. In the first match of the 1963–64 season he took 6 for 44 and 7 for 41 in a one-wicket victory over Canterbury.

Cunis played his first Test against the visiting South Africans at the end of the 1963–64 season, taking two wickets (Graeme Pollock and Denis Lindsay) in a drawn match. He had a moderate season in 1964–65 and was not selected for any of the home Tests against Pakistan or the tour that followed. In 1965–66 he took 22 wickets at 17.45 in the Plunket Shield and played in all three Tests against England, taking seven wickets at 35.43 off 121.5 overs. In the First Test, when New Zealand were 32 for 8 in the second innings, "Cunis, a well-built Rugby centre-threequarter, saved the day by defending successfully through the last thirty-five minutes" in a partnership with Vic Pollard. His 16 not out was the top score.

In the first match of the 1966–67 season, Cunis took 7 for 30 against Northern Districts. In his most successful batting season he made 293 runs at 41.85 in the Plunket Shield, including two 50s and the only first-class century of his career, 111, batting at number eight against Otago. He also took 19 wickets at 20.21, and played for New Zealand in three of the matches against the visiting Australian side, but with little success.

In 1968–69 he took 30 wickets at 12.60 to help Auckland to the Plunket Shield. Once again he shone in the season's opening match, taking 6 for 39 and 4 for 54 in an innings victory over Northern Districts. He played in the three Tests against the visiting West Indies side later that season, taking 2 for 76 and 3 for 36 in New Zealand's victory in the Second Test.

Cunis toured England in 1969. His early form was unimpressive, but after taking 6 for 54 against Sussex he was selected for the Third Test and took 3 for 49 and 2 for 36. He played all three Tests against India later that year, taking nine wickets at 17.55, then two Tests against Pakistan for six wickets at 23.50. In the Third Test at Dacca, coming in at 101 for 8 in the second innings with New Zealand leading by only 84, he batted for more than two hours with Mark Burgess, scoring 23 in a partnership of 96 that put the match out of Pakistan's reach and gave New Zealand their first ever series victory.

==== 1970s ====
Cunis's jaw was broken while batting for New Zealand against Western Australia in Perth in the Australasian one-day competition in January 1971, but he played in the two Tests against England that began a few weeks later. The Second Test in Auckland was his most successful Test, when his "persistent length and sharp out-swing provided a consistent challenge to the batsmen" and he took 6 for 76 and 3 for 52.

He was selected to play in the World XI that toured Australia in 1971–72, but had little success. In the tour to the West Indies that followed, Cunis took only six wickets in the five Tests at an average of 102.83. He did, however, hit his highest Test score, 51, in the second Test, adding 136 for the eighth wicket with Bevan Congdon in 190 minutes. After that series he lost his place in the Test team to the younger fast bowlers Richard Collinge, Dayle Hadlee and Richard Hadlee, although he continued to play domestic cricket in New Zealand until 1976–77.

==== Assessment ====
Dick Brittenden wrote that Cunis's cricket career was plagued by knee injuries that affected his bowling. "His inability to move really freely gave him in his run-up the lurching gait of a drunken sailor; and [he] seemed to bowl from the wrong foot, to add to his enchantment."

Test Match Special commentator Alan Gibson once commented, "This is Cunis at the Vauxhall End. Cunis, a funny sort of name: neither one thing nor the other." However, according to his Wisden obituary, the witticism was probably first coined by Alan Ross in a report in The Observer of the New Zealanders' match against Sussex in 1969.

=== Coach and commentator ===
Cunis was coach of the New Zealand cricket team between 1987 and 1990. He subsequently worked as a cricket commentator on television, displaying a "dry wit and insight".

== Teaching career ==
Cunis worked as a school teacher, and was principal at Waiohau School in the Bay of Plenty and Maungakaramea School southeast of Whangārei. He also taught at the Maunu Health Camp.

== Death and legacy ==
Cunis died at his home in Ruakākā on 9 August 2008, at the age of 67, and his ashes were buried in Maunu Cemetery. His wife, Jeanette Cunis, died in 2026.

The Bob Cunis Cup is contested in cricket matches between the Northland and Auckland teams.
