= Merv Wallace =

New Zealand cricketer

Merv Wallace MNZM
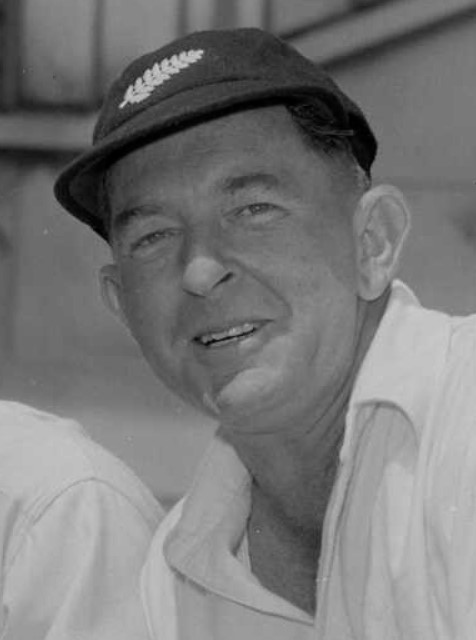
- Wallace in 1956

Personal information
- Full name: Walter Mervyn Wallace
- Born: 19 December 1916; Grey Lynn, Auckland, New Zealand
- Died: 21 March 2008 (aged 91); Auckland, New Zealand
- Batting: Right-handed
- Bowling: Right-arm offbreak
- Relatives: George Wallace (brother); Gregory Wallace (son); Grant Fox (son-in-law); Ryan Fox (grandson)

International information
- National side: New Zealand (1937–1953)
- Test debut (cap 32): 26 June 1937 v England
- Last Test: 13 March 1953 v South Africa

Career statistics
| Competition | Test | First-class |
|---|---|---|
| Matches | 13 | 121 |
| Runs scored | 439 | 7,757 |
| Batting average | 20.90 | 44.32 |
| 100s/50s | 0/5 | 17/43 |
| Top score | 66 | 211 |
| Balls bowled | 6 | 34 |
| Wickets | 0 | 0 |
| Bowling average | – | – |
| 5 wickets in innings | – | – |
| 10 wickets in match | – | – |
| Best bowling | – | – |
| Catches/stumpings | 5/– | 68/– |
- Source: Cricinfo, 1 April 2017

Walter Mervyn Wallace MNZM (19 December 1916 – 21 March 2008) was a New Zealand cricketer and former Test match captain.

Former New Zealand captain John Reid called him "the most under-rated cricketer to have worn the silver fern." He was nicknamed "Flip" by his teammates, because that was the strongest expletive they ever heard him say.

== Cricket playing career ==
Wallace was born in Grey Lynn, Auckland. He left school aged 13, and was coached at Eden Park by Ted Bowley and Jim Parks. He played cricket with his brother, George Wallace, with the Point Chevalier Cricket Club, and then the Auckland under-20 side.

He made his first-class debut for Auckland in the Plunket Shield in December 1933. Wallace toured England in 1937 as part of a New Zealand team weakened by a policy of refusing to select professional cricketers. He scored two half-centuries (52 and 56) on his Test debut, at Lord's. He headed the tour batting averages, scoring 1,641 runs at an average of 41.02.

He scored 211, his highest first-class score, against Canterbury in January 1940, making his runs in 292 minutes. He joined the New Zealand Expeditionary Force, but was invalided out due to stomach muscle problems caused by an appendix operation.

The peak years of his cricketing career were lost to the Second World War, and he did not play Test cricket again until March 1946.

He played in New Zealand's first Test against Australia, in Wellington in March 1946, which Australia won by an innings within two days. He also played against the English tourists in 1947. He joined the four-Test tour to England in 1949 as vice-captain to Walter Hadlee. He scored 1,722 first-class runs at an average of 49.20, including centuries against Yorkshire, Worcester, Leicester, Cambridge University and Glamorgan. He scored 910 runs before the end of May, narrowly failing to join Donald Bradman (twice) and Glenn Turner as the only touring batsmen to pass 1,000 runs before the end of May. He was less successful in the Tests.

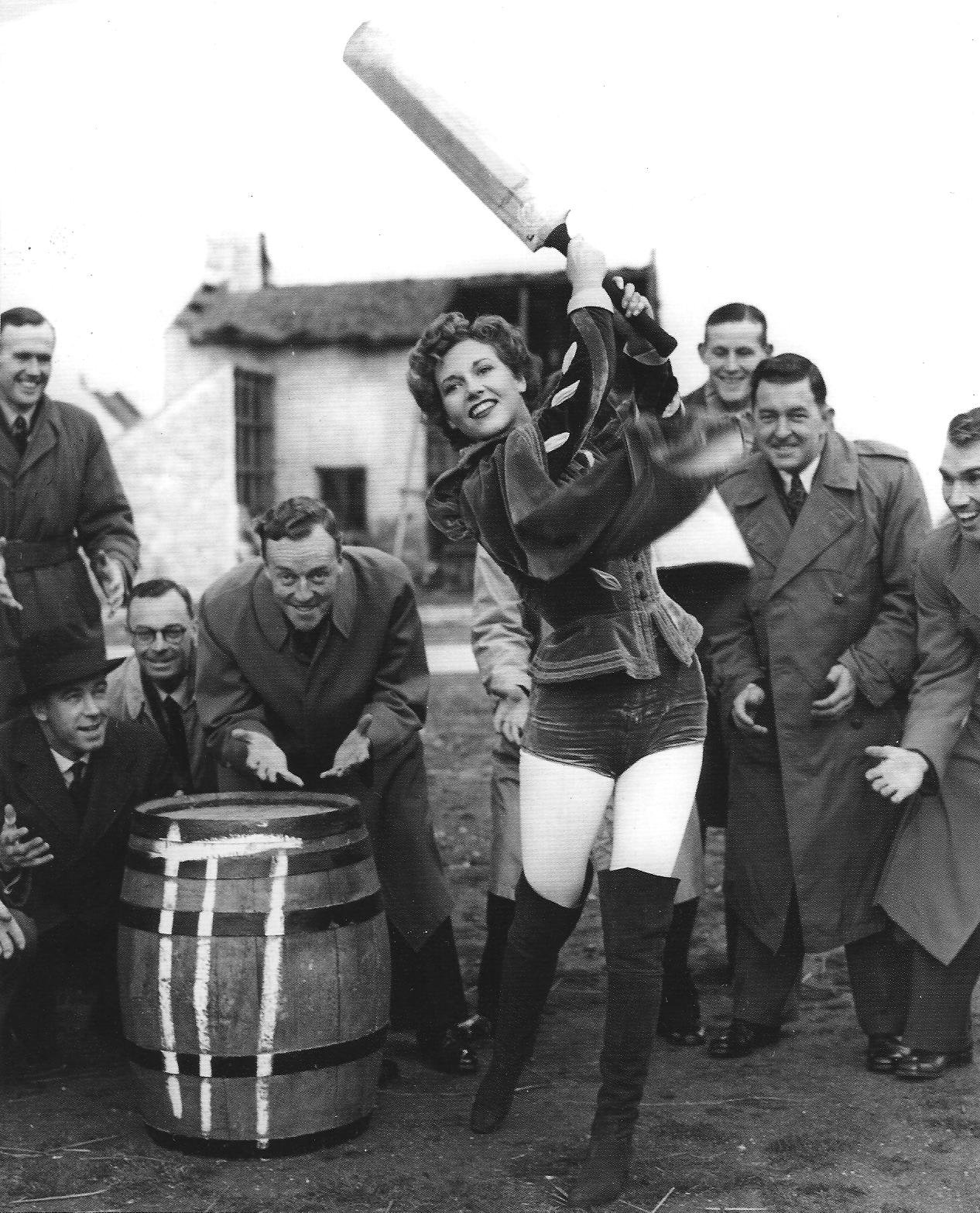
British film actress Rona Anderson demonstrates her cricket skills to players of the 1949 New Zealand cricket team touring England during a visit to Pinewood Studios. Left to right: Martin Donnelly (kneeling), Geoff Rabone, Walter Hadlee (kneeling), Frank Mooney, Rona Anderson, Harry Cave, Merv Wallace, John Reid

He made his Test best score of 66 against England at Christchurch in 1951, and played his last two Tests as captain against the touring South Africans in 1953. Short but quick, he was able to score all round the wicket, with a particularly notable cover drive. His Test batting average of 20.90 was widely considered to fail to reflect his batting abilities.

== Cricket coaching career ==
Wallace began coaching in his early twenties, when he was employed by the Auckland sporting gods store Wisemans to coach in schools. He continued to coach at school and club level for most of his life. During the 1949 tour of England he acted as unofficial team coach.

Wallace was the official coach of New Zealand's first victorious Test team, against the West Indies at Eden Park in 1956. He was retained for the series against the Australian team in 1956-57. Afterwards, however, his coaching prowess was overlooked by the New Zealand administrators.

John Reid, the captain of the unsuccessful touring team to England in 1958, said it was a mistake not to include Wallace as player-coach in the team: "Our 1958 team was desperately short of experience and technical expertise. In those circumstances, Merv would have been a priceless asset."

== After cricket ==
Wallace ran a sports shop in Auckland with tennis player Bill Webb from 1947 to 1982. The Wallace & Webb Ltd shop included a tea room, so the many sportsmen who dropped in could stay for advice or a chat and could bring their wives or children. It became a popular meeting place for sporting people.

In the 2004 Queen's Birthday Honours, Wallace was appointed a Member of the New Zealand Order of Merit, for services to cricket. He was awarded the Bert Sutcliffe Medal in 2005.

The Old Members Stand at the Eden Park Outer Oval was renamed the Merv Wallace Stand in his honour.

== Family ==
Merv Wallace married Yvonne ("Vonnie") Page in Auckland on 10 March 1948 – a Wednesday, so that their friends, most of whom were cricketers and busy on Saturdays, could attend. His brother, George Wallace, and son, Gregory Wallace, both played first-class cricket for Auckland. His daughter, Adele, married rugby union player Grant Fox; one of their children is the golfer Ryan Fox.

A biography, Merv Wallace: A Cricket Master by Joseph Romanos, was published in 2000.

== Death ==
Wallace suffered from diabetes in later life, becoming blind and losing several toes. He died in Auckland on Good Friday in 2008. As a mark of respect, the New Zealand team playing England in the Third Test at McLean Park in Napier wore black armbands on Saturday 22 March.

Sporting positions
| Preceded by Bert Sutcliffe | New Zealand national cricket captain 1952/3 | Succeeded by Geoff Rabone |
