= David Hartshorn =

New Zealand cricketer (born 1966)

Personal information
- Full name: David John Hartshorn
- Born: 17 May 1966 (age 60); Christchurch, New Zealand
- Batting: Right-handed
- Bowling: Right-arm legbreak

Domestic team information
- Years: Team
- 1984/85–1987/88: Canterbury
- 1993/94: Central Districts
- FC debut: 17 January 1985 Canterbury v Otago
- Last FC: 17 February 1994 Central Districts v Canterbury
- LA debut: 27 December 1986 Canterbury v Wellington
- Last LA: 30 December 1987 Canterbury v Auckland

Career statistics
Competition	First-class	List A
Matches	26	7
Runs scored	863	30
Batting average	23.32	7.50
100s/50s	1/0	0/0
Top score	103	15
Balls bowled	2,129	282
Wickets	42	10
Bowling average	50.69	19.50
5 wickets in innings	0	0
10 wickets in match	0	0
Best bowling	4/45	3/30
Catches/stumpings	15/–	0/–
- Source: ESPNcricinfo, 17 January 2011

David John Hartshorn (born 17 May 1966) is a former New Zealand cricketer. He captained the under-19 team to three 'Test' draws and three 'ODI' losses against the Australian under-19 team. He is a right-hand batsman and leg-break bowler. He played 26 first-class matches, scoring 863 runs and taking 42 wickets. He also played seven List A matches.
