= Rex Hooton =

New Zealand cricketer (born 1947)

Personal information
- Full name: Rex Clive Hooton
- Born: 14 February 1947 (age 79); Auckland, New Zealand
- Batting: Right-handed
- Bowling: Slow left-arm orthodox
- Role: Batsman

Domestic team information
- Years: Team
- 1968/69–1971/72: Northern Districts
- 1979/80: Auckland
- FC debut: 27 January 1969 Northern Districts v Canterbury
- Last FC: 26 March 1980 Auckland v Young New Zealand
- Only LA: 9 December 1979 Auckland v Northern Districts

Career statistics
Competition	First-class	List A
Matches	19	1
Runs scored	598	16
Batting average	19.93	16.00
100s/50s	0/3	0/0
Top score	54	16
Balls bowled	216	–
Wickets	5	–
Bowling average	12.60	–
5 wickets in innings	0	–
10 wickets in match	0	–
Best bowling	4/38	–
Catches/stumpings	9/–	0/–
- Source: CricketArchive, 18 November 2008

Rex Clive Hooton (born 14 February 1947) is a former New Zealand cricketer who played first-class cricket for Auckland and Northern Districts. A right-hand bat and slow left-arm orthodox spin bowler, Hooton played 19 first-class matches from 1968 until 1980, and enjoyed some success with both the bat and occasionally with the ball. He scored three half-centuries during his career, as well as taking five wickets at a respectable 12.60.

== Playing career ==
Hooton was born in Auckland, New Zealand, and played his earliest top-class cricket matches for Waikato during the winter of 1968. He joined Northern Districts in January 1969, and played his first match for them on 27 January against Canterbury. Opening the batting, Hooton scored two and three as the match ended in a draw. Hooton did not feature in another Northern Districts line up until Christmas Day 1969, where he faced Central Districts, scoring 46 in his only innings as the match ended in another draw. This was the first of seven matches Hooton played during the 1969–70 season, where he scored 228 runs including one fifty at 20.72. He also took four wickets at 14.25 with his spin bowling. These included figures a match against the Australian touring team in Napier on 2 March 1970, having been chosen for the New Zealand Under-23s. Batting at three, Hooton failed to make a substantial impact, scoring six and five as Australia won by an innings and 20 runs.

Hooton played five more matches over the winter of 1971–72, scoring 132 runs at 14.66, however he failed to pass fifty with a high score of 41. His final season, after a seven-year absence, was the winter of 1979–80, where he played six matches for Auckland. This final season was Hooton's most successful with the bat, scoring 233 runs at 29.12, including two fifties, one of which matches his career best 54. He also took one final wicket with his spin, ending with a bowling average of 6.00. It was during this season that Hooton played his only List-A match, also for Auckland, where he scored 16 runs, however he did not bowl.

== Professional coaching career ==
Rex coached Auckland from 1989 to 1992. They won the Shell Cup (List A) in the 1989–90 season and the Shell Trophy (First Class) in 1990–91. He later turned his hand to selecting and was convenor of selectors from 1993 to 1995 and again from 1998 to 2001.

== Later life ==
Rex is currently President and Honorary Member of Auckland Cricket, and Past President of both the Auckland Cricket Society and the Auckland University Cricket Club, where he is also a Life Member. He was the school cricket coach at St Kentigern College in Auckland from 2009 to 2015 and held a similar role at St Edward's School in Oxford during the northern summer from 2011 to 2015.
