= John Murtagh =

New Zealand cricketer (born 1967)

Personal information
- Full name: John Richard Murtagh
- Born: 21 July 1967 (age 59); Geraldine, Canterbury, New Zealand
- Batting: Right-handed
- Bowling: Right-arm medium

Domestic team information
- Years: Team
- 1988/89: Otago
- 1991/92: Wellington

Career statistics
| Competition | First-class | List A |
|---|---|---|
| Matches | 6 | 3 |
| Runs scored | 126 | 28 |
| Batting average | 11.45 | 9.33 |
| 100s/50s | 0/0 | 0/0 |
| Top score | 44 | 16 |
| Catches/stumpings | 6/– | 0/– |
- Source: CricketArchive, 21 January 2011

John Richard Murtagh (born 21 July 1967) is a New Zealand former cricketer who played first class and List A cricket between the 1988–89 and 1991–92 seasons.

Murtagh was born at Geraldine in Canterbury in 1967. A middle-order batsman, he captained the New Zealand under-19 team in three Youth Test matches and three Youth One Day Internationals against the Australian under-19 team during the 1986–87 season. He had played age-group and B team cricket for Wellington, before going on to make his senior representative debut for Otago in a January 1989 List A match against Canterbury. After scoring 10 runs on debut, he played against the same side in his first-class debut later in the season, recording a duck in the only innings in which he batted.

These were Murtagh's only senior appearances for Otago, and he did not play at representative level again until the 1991–92 season, although he continued to play for Otago's Second XI. He made five first-class and two List A appearances for Wellington during 1991–92. In total he scored 126 first-class and 28 List A runs.
