= Jarrod Englefield =

New Zealand cricketer (born 1979)

Personal information
- Full name: Jarrod Ian Englefield
- Born: 18 December 1979 (age 46); Blenheim, Marlborough, New Zealand
- Batting: Right-handed

Domestic team information
- Years: Team
- 1998/99: Central Districts
- 1999/00–2002/03: Canterbury
- 2003/04–2005/06: Central Districts

Career statistics
Competition	FC	LA	T20
Matches	55	43	2
Runs scored	3,113	840	46
Batting average	34.58	26.25	23.00
100s/50s	3/25	0/6	0/0
Top score	172	80*	34
Balls bowled	85	–	–
Wickets	1	–	–
Bowling average	48.00	–	–
5 wickets in innings	0	–	–
10 wickets in match	0	–	–
Best bowling	1/22	–	–
Catches/stumpings	28/–	13/–	0/–
- Source: CricketArchive, 20 January 2011

Jarrod Ian Englefield (born 18 December 1979) is a New Zealand former cricketer. He captained New Zealand in three Under-19 Tests against England in 1998–9, winning one and losing one. He is a right-handed batsmen, who has since played first-class, List A and Twenty20 cricket for Central Districts and Canterbury, but has not played for the senior New Zealand team.
