= Mark Burgess (cricketer) =

New Zealand cricketer

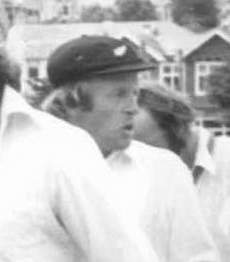
- Burgess in 1978

Personal information
- Full name: Mark Gordon Burgess
- Born: 17 July 1944 (age 82); Auckland, New Zealand
- Batting: Right-handed
- Bowling: Right-arm off break
- Role: Batsman
- Relatives: Gordon Burgess (father)

International information
- National side: New Zealand (1968–1981)
- Test debut (cap 112): 15 February 1968 v India
- Last Test: 26 December 1980 v Australia
- ODI debut (cap 1): 11 February 1973 v Pakistan
- Last ODI: 3 February 1981 v Australia

Domestic team information
- Years: Team
- 1966/67–1979/80: Auckland

Career statistics
Competition	Test	ODI	FC	LA
Matches	50	26	192	42
Runs scored	2,684	336	10,281	603
Batting average	31.20	16.80	35.82	17.73
100s/50s	5/14	0/0	20/62	0/0
Top score	119*	47	146	47
Balls bowled	498	74	2,328	217
Wickets	6	1	30	4
Bowling average	35.33	69.00	38.26	38.25
5 wickets in innings	0	0	0	0
10 wickets in match	0	0	0	0
Best bowling	3/23	1/10	3/23	2/28
Catches/stumpings	34/–	8/–	152/–	12/–
- Source: Cricinfo, 17 April 2017

Mark Burgess
Personal information
- Full name: Mark Gordon Burgess

Senior career*
Years	Team	Apps	(Gls)
- Eden

International career
1965–1967	New Zealand U-23	7	(1)
- * Club domestic league appearances and goals

Mark Gordon Burgess (born 17 July 1944) is a former cricketer who played Test cricket for New Zealand from 1968 to 1980, captaining the team from 1978 to 1980. A right-handed batsman, who bowled right-arm off-breaks, Burgess played in New Zealand's first One Day International (ODI) in 1973.

His father Gordon Burgess played for Auckland between 1940–41 and 1954–55 and managed the New Zealand team that toured England, India and Pakistan in 1969.

== Early life ==
Born in Auckland, Burgess was raised in the Auckland suburb of Remuera and attended Remuera Intermediate School. Between 1958 and 1963 he attended Auckland Grammar School, where he showed his talent as a sportsman by becoming a member of both the cricket and soccer 1st Elevens for several years.

== Cricket career in the 1960s ==
Burgess made his first-class debut for a New Zealand Under-23 XI against Auckland in 1963–64 at the age of 19. He played his first matches in the Plunket Shield for Auckland in 1966–67, scoring 270 runs at 33.75 in six matches. It was enough to secure his selection for the short non-Test tour of Australia in 1967–68, and the four Tests against India that followed in New Zealand, when he scored three fifties and was the second-highest-scoring New Zealander with 271 runs at 33.87.

He made his first first-class century, 102, shortly afterwards in April 1968 when he played two matches in India with several other international players to raise money for the Koyna Relief Fund. He made two more centuries for Auckland in the 1968–69 season, but was not successful in two Tests against the West Indies. Nevertheless, he was selected to tour England, India and Pakistan in 1969. He had little success in England, and after the First Test in India he had played nine Tests for 368 runs at 21.65 and one wicket. But in the Second Test in Nagpur, on a turning pitch, he made 89 (the highest score in the match) and 12, and took 3 for 23 and 1 for 18, as New Zealand's spinners (Burgess, Vic Pollard and Hedley Howarth) prevailed to take New Zealand to its first-ever victory in India, at the 11th try.

He hit his first Test century in the following series in Pakistan. New Zealand needed to win or draw the Third Test at Dacca to give the country its first overseas series victory against any opponent. Burgess hit 59 in the first innings. After losing eight wickets for 101 in the second innings New Zealand were only 84 ahead and apparently heading for defeat, but Burgess scored 119 not out, in an eventual total of 200, putting on 96 for the ninth wicket with Bob Cunis. According to Wisden Burgess "gave a magnificent display" over four and a quarter hours.

== Cricket career in the 1970s ==
When Burgess scored centuries against England in Auckland in 1970–71 and against the West Indies in Kingston in 1971–72 he achieved the rare feat of centuries in three consecutive Tests, even if they were spaced over two and a half years. He hit further Test centuries against England at Lord's in 1973, and against Pakistan in Lahore in 1976–77.

Burgess captained New Zealand in 10 of his 50 Tests. During his term as captain, New Zealand only won one Test, his first as captain, in Wellington in 1977–78, but it was an important victory, the first ever by New Zealand over England, in the 48th Test between the two countries. He also captained New Zealand in the 1979 World Cup, when they reached the semi-finals but lost to England by nine runs.

He played his last Test against Australia at Melbourne in 1980–81, scoring 49 and 10 not out under the captaincy of Geoff Howarth, who had succeeded him. He hit 134 against Tasmania in the next match, and retired from first-class cricket at the end of the tour, at the age of 36. The highest of his 20 first-class centuries was 146 for Auckland against Central Districts at Auckland in 1971–72, when he captained Auckland to victory by an innings and 165 runs. Despite his success at Nagpur in 1969–70, afterwards he seldom bowled in Tests, and only occasionally in first-class matches.

Christopher Martin-Jenkins summed him up as "a fair-haired right-hander with a sound technique and some handsome attacking strokes, especially adept at driving", and says of his captaincy and overall attitude to cricket, "he was popular with both his own team and his opponents. Essentially a dedicated amateur cricketer in a professional age, his attitude was that winning or losing was not life or death."

During the 1970s, before the advent of professional sport in New Zealand, sportsmen were required to support themselves and take unpaid leave to complete overseas tours. In the mid-1970s Burgess joined the staff of a leading Auckland sportsgoods wholesaler, Brittain Wynyard & Co. Ltd. Beginning as a sales representative, he became promotions manager of the company.

== Football ==
Burgess won the inaugural New Zealand Footballer of the Year award in 1965, playing as an inside forward. He played regularly for the New Zealand national under-23 football team from 1965 to 1967, scoring one goal in his seven appearances, and played one game for the New Zealand national football team in an unofficial match against a touring Manchester United side in 1967.

Burgess later served on the New Zealand Soccer council for over thirty years. In 2013, he became a founding committee member of the independent group Friends of Football.

Sporting positions
Preceded by Glenn Turner	New Zealand national cricket captain 1977/8–1978/9	Succeeded by Geoff Howarth
