= New Zealand cricket team in Australia in 1982–83 =

International cricket tour

The New Zealand national cricket team toured Australia in the 1982–83 season and played a total of 21 matches, mostly One Day Internationals in the Benson & Hedges World Series Cup against Australia and England. New Zealand reached the finals of the competition but lost to Australia 2–0. A highlight of the finals series was a 21-ball half century from Lance Cairns at the Melbourne Cricket Ground containing 6 sixes. This was a world record for One Day Internationals at the time.

== Bushfire Appeal Challenge Match ==
In order to raise funds for the 1983 bushfires, the New Zealanders returned to Australia, a month after they played in the Benson & Hedges World Series Cup.

17 March 1983 (D/N)
Scorecard

| New Zealand; 138/8 (35 overs) | v | Australia; 124 (34 overs) |
| MD Crowe 66 (67); JN Maguire 2/9 (7 overs) | | KH MacLeay 41 (37); EJ Chatfield 4/20 (7 overs) |

New Zealand won by 14 runs
Sydney Cricket Ground, Sydney
Umpires: RA French and MW Johnson

- Australia won the toss and elected to field.
- The match was reduced before play started from 50 overs to 35 overs per side.
- MR Whitney (AUS) and TJ Franklin (NZ) made their ODI debuts.

== External sources ==
- CricketArchive – tour summaries

== Annual reviews ==
- Playfair Cricket Annual 1983
- Wisden Cricketers' Almanack 1983
