= New Zealand cricket team in India in 1969–70 =

International cricket tour

New Zealand cricket team in India in 1969-70
- Date: 19 September 1969 – 20 October 1969
- Location: India
- Result: 3 Match -Test series drawn 1-1
Teams
- India: New Zealand
Captains
- Nawab of Pataudi: Graham Dowling
Most runs
- Ajit Wadekar (167) Nawab of Pataudi (129) Abid Ali (102): Graham Dowling (257); Bev Congdon (174); Bruce Murray (166)
Most wickets
- Erapalli Prasanna (20) Bishan Singh Bedi (15) Venkataraghavan (11): Dayle Hadlee (13); Hedley Howarth (12); Bob Cunis (9)

The New Zealand national cricket team toured India in 1969–70 season. The two teams played three Tests. Test series drawn 1-1. When India were bowled out for 89 runs on the third day of the third Test, the crowd reacted by throwing stones at the police and starting fires within the ground.

== Test matches ==
=== 1st Test ===
25–30 September 1969
scorecard

India	v	New Zealand
156 (66.2 overs); Ajit Wadekar 49; Dayle Hadlee 3/17 (11 overs)		229 (117.3 overs); Bevan Congdon 78; Erapalli Prasanna 4/97 (46.3 overs)
260 (136.2 overs); Nawab of Pataudi 67; Bruce Taylor 3/30 (18 overs)		127 (69.5 overs); Graham Dowling 36; Bishan Singh Bedi 6/42 (30.5 overs)

India won by 60 runs
Brabourne Stadium, Bombay
Umpires: AM Mamsa, B Satyaji Rao

- India won the toss and decided to bat

=== 2nd Test ===
3–8 October 1969
scorecard

New Zealand	v	India
319 (130 overs); Mark Burgess 89; Bishan Singh Bedi 4/98 (45 overs)		257 (99.2 overs); Abid Ali 63; Hedley Howarth 4/66 (30 overs)
214 (105.1 overs); Glenn Turner 57; Venkataraghavan 6/74 (30.1 overs)		109 (55.5 overs); Nawab of Pataudi 28; Hedley Howarth 5/34 (23 overs)

New Zealand won by 167 runs
Vidarbha Cricket Association Ground, Nagpur
Umpires: SP Pan, V Rajagopal

- New Zealand won the toss and decided to bat

=== 3rd Test ===
15–20 October 1969
scorecard

New Zealand	v	India
181 (99.1 overs); Bruce Murray 80; Erapalli Prasanna 5/51 (29 overs)		89 (54.2 overs); Srinivas Venkataraghavan 25; Dayle Hadlee 4/30 (17 overs)
175/8 d. (82 overs); Graham Dowling 60; Abid Ali 3/47 (27 overs)		76/7 (46.4 overs); Ashok Gandotra 15; Bob Cunis 3/12 (12 overs)

Match drawn
Lal Bahadur Shastri Stadium, Hyderabad
Umpires: SK Bhattacharya, MV Nagendra

- New Zealand won the toss and decided to bat
