= Geoff Howarth =

New Zealand cricketer (born 1951)

Geoff Howarth OBE
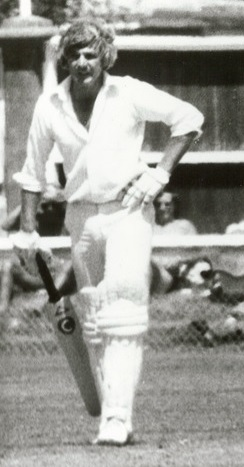
- Howarth in 1978

Personal information
- Full name: Geoffrey Philip Howarth
- Born: 29 March 1951 (age 75); Auckland, New Zealand
- Batting: Right-handed
- Bowling: Right-arm off break
- Role: Batsman
- Relatives: Hedley Howarth (brother)

International information
- National side: New Zealand (1975–1985)
- Test debut (cap 132): 20 February 1975 v England
- Last Test: 4 May 1985 v West Indies
- ODI debut (cap 19): 8 March 1975 v England
- Last ODI: 23 April 1985 v West Indies

Domestic team information
- Years: Team
- 1971–1985: Surrey
- 1972/73–1973/74: Auckland
- 1973/74–1985/86: Northern Districts

Career statistics
Competition	Test	ODI	FC	LA
Matches	47	70	338	278
Runs scored	2,531	1,384	17,294	5,997
Batting average	32.44	23.06	31.90	23.98
100s/50s	6/11	0/6	32/88	2/29
Top score	147	76	183	122
Balls bowled	614	90	8,525	682
Wickets	3	3	112	24
Bowling average	90.33	22.66	32.10	20.29
5 wickets in innings	0	0	1	0
10 wickets in match	0	0	0	0
Best bowling	1/13	1/4	5/32	4/16
Catches/stumpings	29/–	16/–	229/–	76/–
- Source: Cricinfo, 22 October 2016

Geoffrey Philip Howarth (born 29 March 1951) is a former New Zealand cricketer and former captain, who remains the only New Zealand captain to have positive win–loss records in both Test cricket and ODI cricket. He was the third most successful test captain for New Zealand winning 36.7% of games with 11 wins from 30 test matches.

== Cricket career ==
=== Domestic ===
Howarth, after finishing school at Auckland Grammar School obtained six week trials at both Surrey and Gloucester in 1969. He took up a contract with Surrey and in his first year playing for the second eleven, he was informed in the last week of the season that he would not be re-engaged. He then scored 126 not out against Glamorgan in the last game of the season. Howarth was offered a full contract in 1973 and achieved the highest score (159) by any Surrey player that season. He was awarded his county cap in 1974.

His best season with Surrey was 1976, when he scored 1554 first class runs and two centuries.

His highest first-class score was 183, for Surrey against Hampshire at The Oval in 1979, "a cultured innings lasting four hours" which helped Surrey to an eight-wicket victory. A specialist batsman, he was occasionally employed as a spin bowler; his best bowling figures were 5 for 32 for Auckland against Central Districts at Auckland in 1973–74.

Howarth played a total of 188 matches for Surrey County Cricket Club in England between 1971 and 1985, and was the first overseas player to captain the club, which he did in 1984. In 1985, he continued as a non playing captain as Surrey used Tony Gray and Sylvester Clarke as their overseas players that season. Howarth described this as a "...frustrating experience... and was disappointed not to have the opportunity to prove my qualities as a captain at Surrey..."

=== International ===
Howarth played some Test cricket with his elder brother Hedley, but most of his 47-Test career did not overlap with Hedley's. He played most of his career as a specialist batsman, captaining the team for 30 of those 47 Tests, and although his batting average of only 32 was not stunning, he did make six Test centuries. Four of those came while he was not captaining the side. He scored a century in each innings against England at Auckland in 1978. From 1978 to 1983, Howarth was rated in the top 10 batsmen in the world by the Coopers and Lybrand rating system.

In his debut series as captain, he led the side to their first Test series victory over the West Indies in 1980, when New Zealand won the first Test chasing 104 after being 73 for 8, then drew the second Test thanks to 147 from Howarth, and also survived an evenly fought third Test. He captained New Zealand between 1980 and 1985. New Zealand had a reputation for being hard to beat during this period, especially at home. Of the seven tests they lost under Howarth just one, against Australia in 1982, occurred in New Zealand.

In 1985, Howarth scored 84 over a five-hour period in his final innings in the fourth test against the West Indies at Sabina Park, Kingston. His partnership with Jeff Crowe of 210 runs was impressive given the New Zealand total of 283. He was subsequently dropped from the New Zealand team to play Australia. Howarth, on finding out he had been dropped, described it as "the lowest day of my life. My career had been destroyed. I did not know it was coming".

Ian Smith described Geoff Howarth as "Quite simply the best captain I've played under to date...I always found him approachable and generous...Geoff Howarth had the midas touch. He also came to grips with the ins and outs of the one day game very quickly, perhaps the most important factor in the initial boom and success of the [New Zealand] team in the early eighties".

=== Coaching and other activities ===
Howarth became coach for the New Zealand team in the early 1990s and was coach of the ill-fated tour of South Africa in 1994. His contract with New Zealand Cricket was terminated in 1995 with a clause preventing him from "going public" for three years. After that period had expired, he published his autobiography.

Now residing in England, Howarth returned to Wellington in 2012 as ambassador for the World Vintage Cricket Carnival; at that time he was coaching cricket at Haileybury School in Hertfordshire and continued to do so in 2017.

== Honours and awards ==
Howarth was appointed a Member of the Order of the British Empire, for services to cricket, in the 1981 Queen's Birthday Honours. In the 1984 Queen's Birthday Honours, he was promoted to Officer of the Order of the British Empire, also for services to cricket.

Sporting positions
Preceded by Mark Burgess	New Zealand national cricket captain 1979/80–1984/85	Succeeded by Jeremy Coney
