= Hedley Howarth =

New Zealand cricketer

Personal information
- Full name: Hedley John Howarth
- Born: 25 December 1943; Grey Lynn, New Zealand
- Died: 7 November 2008 (aged 64); Auckland, New Zealand
- Batting: Left-handed
- Bowling: Slow left-arm orthodox
- Role: Bowler
- Relatives: Geoff Howarth (brother)

International information
- National side: New Zealand (1969–1977)
- Test debut (cap 120): 24 July 1969 v England
- Last Test: 25 February 1977 v Australia
- ODI debut (cap 8): 11 February 1973 v Pakistan
- Last ODI: 18 June 1975 v West Indies

Domestic team information
- Years: Team
- 1963/64–1978/79: Auckland

Career statistics
Competition	Test	ODI	FC	LA
Matches	30	9	145	30
Runs scored	291	18	1,668	106
Batting average	12.12	6.00	13.78	10.60
100s/50s	0/1	0/0	0/3	0/0
Top score	61	11	61	29
Balls bowled	8,833	492	37,421	1,617
Wickets	86	11	541	46
Bowling average	36.95	25.45	25.27	20.36
5 wickets in innings	2	0	31	1
10 wickets in match	0	0	6	0
Best bowling	5/34	3/29	8/75	5/22
Catches/stumpings	33/–	3/–	137/–	9/–
- Source: Cricinfo, 22 October 2016

Hedley John Howarth (25 December 1943 – 7 November 2008) was an international cricketer who played 30 Tests and nine One Day Internationals for New Zealand. The elder brother of Geoff Howarth, former New Zealand captain, he was born and died in Auckland.

== Domestic career ==
Howarth attended Auckland Grammar School, where he was a pace bowler. After he left school he had back trouble, and his coach, Merv Wallace, suggested he take up spin bowling. He became an orthodox left-arm bowler, and made his first-class debut in 1962.

== International career ==
Between 1969 and 1977, Howarth played 30 Tests for New Zealand, capturing 86 wickets at an average of 36.95. Justin Vaughan, chief executive of New Zealand Cricket, credited Howarth with playing a significant role in New Zealand's international cricket history, saying Howarth's "five-wicket bag against India at Nagpur in 1969 was a match winner that helped give New Zealand its first ever Test win on the sub-continent". India were chasing 277 in the fourth innings but Howarth's 5 for 34 gave New Zealand the advantage, highlighted by a catch off his own bowling, leading to a 167-run win. Howarth's other five-wicket haul came a few weeks later in a Test against Pakistan in Karachi, when he picked up 5 for 80.

Howarth holds the New Zealand record for the most overs bowled in a Test innings. He bowled 74 overs, 24 of them maidens, and took 2 wickets for 138 runs against the West Indies in Bridgetown in 1972. He was a part of the New Zealand national cricket team that played in the 1975 Cricket World Cup in England, making it to the tournament semi-finals.

Howarth played his last Test in February 1977 and announced his retirement from Test cricket shortly afterwards. He continued playing first-class cricket until 1979. After retiring, he devoted his time to his family's fishing business, Kia Ora Fisheries, later Kia Ora Seafoods.

== Death ==
Howarth died at age 64 on 7 November 2008. A cause of death was not initially disclosed, though Howarth had been battling cancer for some time.
