= Dayle Hadlee =

New Zealand cricketer

Personal information
- Full name: Dayle Robert Hadlee
- Born: 6 January 1948 (age 78); Christchurch, New Zealand
- Batting: Right-handed
- Bowling: Right-arm medium-fast
- Role: Bowler
- Relatives: Walter Hadlee (father); Richard Hadlee (brother); Barry Hadlee (brother)

International information
- National side: New Zealand (1969–1978)
- Test debut (cap 119): 24 July 1969 v England
- Last Test: 10 February 1978 v England
- ODI debut (cap 5): 11 February 1973 v Pakistan
- Last ODI: 22 February 1976 v India

Domestic team information
- Years: Team
- 1969/70–1983/84: Canterbury

Career statistics
Competition	Test	ODI	FC	LA
Matches	26	11	111	37
Runs scored	530	40	2,113	228
Batting average	14.32	8.00	18.69	12.66
100s/50s	0/1	0/0	1/4	0/0
Top score	56	20	109*	40
Balls bowled	4,883	628	20,116	2,024
Wickets	71	20	351	63
Bowling average	33.64	18.20	25.22	18.33
5 wickets in innings	0	0	11	0
10 wickets in match	0	0	3	0
Best bowling	4/30	4/34	7/55	4/33
Catches/stumpings	8/–	2/–	40/–	10/–
- Source: CricInfo, 22 October 2010

Dayle Robert Hadlee (born 6 January 1948) is a New Zealand former cricketer who played in 26 Tests and 11 ODIs from 1969 to 1978. He is the son of Walter Hadlee, the older brother of Sir Richard Hadlee and the younger brother of Barry Hadlee.

== Cricket career ==
An opening bowler and useful batsman in the lower order, Dayle Hadlee was selected to tour England, India and Pakistan in 1969 after only three first-class matches, none of them in the Plunket Shield. He played in two Tests in England, taking six wickets. He played all six Tests against India and Pakistan, taking 21 wickets at 15.95, including his best Test figures of 4 for 30 in Hyderabad, and making 152 runs at 16.88, including his only Test fifty, 56 at Karachi, when he had a partnership of 100 in 90 minutes for the eighth wicket with Bryan Yuile.

He was hampered by injury for a couple of years and did not make his Plunket Shield debut for Canterbury until 1971–72. In 1972–73 he took 32 wickets in the Shield at 13.50, opening the bowling with his brother Richard, who took 28 at 15.64. Dayle took 6 for 42 against Otago, and 4 for 28 and 7 for 88 against Northern Districts. Richard made his Test debut in the First Test in the home series against Pakistan, then lost his place to Dayle for the last two Tests of the series. Neither brother made much impact. Between the Second and Third Tests New Zealand played its first One Day International, beating Pakistan by 22 runs in fading light in Christchurch; Dayle took 4 for 34.

Dayle and Richard each took 38 first-class wickets on the tour of England in 1973. Dayle played all three Tests, taking 10 wickets at 34.00, including 4 for 42 in the first innings of the First Test. That match, the first Test in which the brothers had played together, was Richard's only Test of the series.

Dayle toured Australia in 1973–74, playing all three Tests, and then played all three when Australia toured New Zealand later that summer, taking 16 wickets in the six matches. In the Second Test in Christchurch, he took 1 for 42 and 4 for 75 in New Zealand's first Test victory over Australia. He played both Tests against the touring English side in 1974–75.

At the 1975 World Cup he took seven economical wickets in the three qualifying matches but was severely punished by Alvin Kallicharran in the semi-final against West Indies. He played all three Tests against the Indian touring team in 1975–76, taking three wickets in New Zealand's victory in Wellington, when Richard took 11. Dayle's final Test was New Zealand's first ever Test victory over England, in Wellington in 1977–78, in which he took no wickets while Richard took 10.

He had taken his best first-class innings figures of 7 for 55 for Canterbury against Wellington earlier in the 1977–78 season. His only first-class century came in 1982–83, when he scored 109 not out in Canterbury's victory over the touring Sri Lankans. He retired after the 1983–84 season, in which he took 17 wickets at 16.88.

== After cricket ==
After he retired he took up coaching. He coached the New Zealand women's national cricket team at the 1988 Women's Cricket World Cup in Australia. In 1999 he described the English cricketer Ian Bell as "the best 16-year-old I've ever seen". In 2008 he was appointed to coach at the Global Cricket Academy in Dubai. In 2012, he discovered Kyle Jamieson, and converted the 6'8" batting all rounder into a bowling all rounder/bowler.
