= Ongley =

Ongley may refer to:

- Arthur Ongley (1882–1974), New Zealand lawyer, and cricket and Rugby union player and administrator
- Baron Ongley, a title in the Peerage of Ireland held by three individuals, created in 1776 and became extinct in 1877
- Esther Ongley, New Zealand lawyer.
- Joe Ongley (1918–2000), New Zealand cricketer and judge
- Marc Ongley (born 1952), Australian classical and jazz guitarist, composer, and teacher, living in the United Kingdom
- Mont Ongley (1888–1976), New Zealand geologist and scientific administrator
- Samuel Ongley (disambiguation)
