= William Hayes (New Zealand cricketer) =

New Zealand cricketer

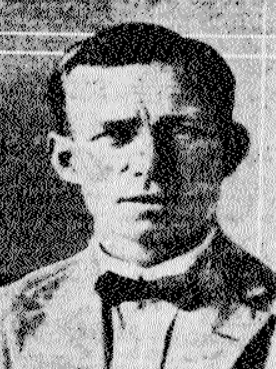
- Hayes in 1928

Personal information
- Full name: William Hugh James Hayes
- Born: 26 April 1890; Christchurch, New Zealand
- Died: 30 June 1972 (aged 82); Christchurch, New Zealand
- Nickname: Chattel
- Batting: Right-handed
- Bowling: Right-arm medium pace
- Role: Occasional wicket-keeper

Domestic team information
- Years: Team
- 1909-10 to 1927-28: Canterbury

Career statistics
Competition	First-class
Matches	24
Runs scored	708
Batting average	16.85
100s/50s	1/4
Top score	125
Balls bowled	490
Wickets	7
Bowling average	30.00
5 wickets in innings	0
10 wickets in match	0
Best bowling	2/25
Catches/stumpings	18/2
- Source: Cricinfo, 19 September 2021

William Hugh James "Chattel" Hayes (26 April 1890 – 30 June 1972) was a New Zealand cricketer. He played in 24 first-class matches for Canterbury from 1909 to 1928.

== Life and career ==
Hayes began his cricket career as a batsman and brilliant fieldsman, then took up medium-pace bowling, and then wicket-keeping. He kept wicket for so long at such a high standard in Christchurch that the award for most wicket-keeping dismissals in a Christchurch cricket season is named the Chattel Hayes Memorial Trophy. He was still keeping wicket in the lower grades in Christchurch into his late sixties.

When Canterbury successfully challenged Auckland for the Plunket Shield in January 1913, Hayes scored 125, the only century in the match. His captain, Dan Reese, said after the match that Hayes was regarded in Christchurch as a "steady, sturdy batsman, difficult to dismiss", but his century showed he was a "finished" batsman, particularly adept at back cutting. Hayes scored 61 when Canterbury defended the Shield in their next match, defeating Otago by an innings. He and Rupert Hickmott (77 runs) added 131 for the second wicket, but no one else in the match reached 40. He was the highest-scoring batsman in the short New Zealand first-class season, with 265 runs in three matches at an average of 66.25 and the only century. Hayes was unable to reproduce this good form in later seasons; however, for a Canterbury B team against Hawke's Bay in January 1920 he scored 103 in 100 minutes.

Hayes was also a boxer, an athlete who specialised in the mile, and a rugby union five-eighth. He served overseas in the first New Zealand Expeditionary Force in World War I. In 1921, he married Alice Maude Ongley, the older sister of the cricketer Arthur Ongley and the geologist Mont Ongley. She died in September 1956; he died in June 1972.
