= James Anderson (cricketer) =

English cricketer (born 1982)

Sir James Anderson OBE
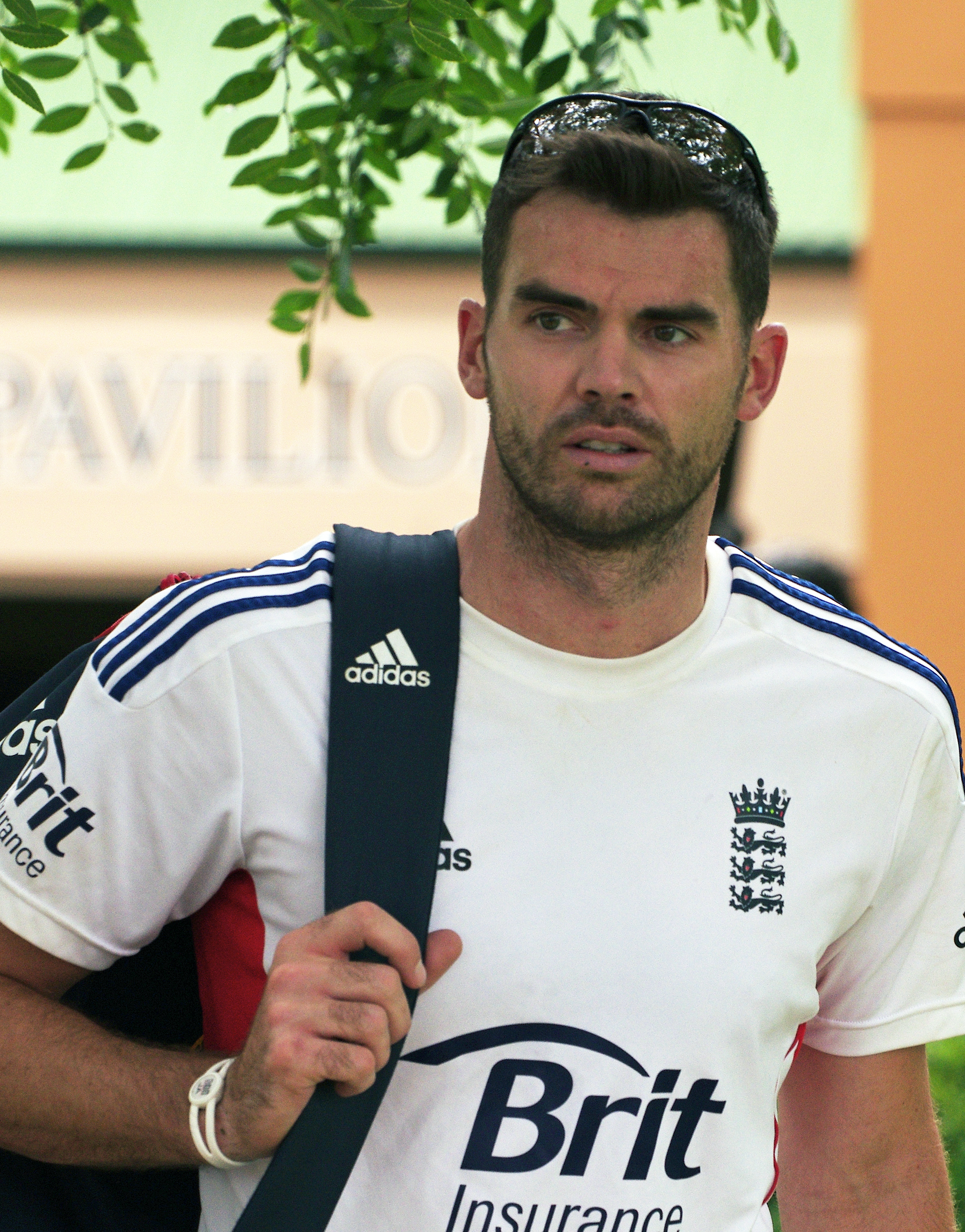
- Anderson during 2013–14 Ashes series

Personal information
- Full name: James Michael Anderson
- Born: 30 July 1982 (age 44); Burnley, Lancashire, England
- Height: 6 ft 2 in (188 cm)
- Batting: Left-handed
- Bowling: Right-arm fast-medium
- Role: Bowler

International information
- National side: England (2002–2024)
- Test debut (cap 613): 22 May 2003 v Zimbabwe
- Last Test: 10 July 2024 v West Indies
- ODI debut (cap 172): 15 December 2002 v Australia
- Last ODI: 13 March 2015 v Afghanistan
- ODI shirt no.: 9 (formerly 40)
- T20I debut (cap 21): 9 January 2007 v Australia
- Last T20I: 15 November 2009 v South Africa
- T20I shirt no.: 9

Domestic team information
- Years: Team
- 2000: Lancashire Cricket Board
- 2001–2026: Lancashire
- 2007/08: Auckland
- 2025: Manchester Originals
- 2027–: Surrey

Career statistics
Competition	Test	ODI	FC	LA
Matches	188	194	315	261
Runs scored	1,353	273	2,085	376
Batting average	8.96	7.58	9.14	8.95
100s/50s	0/1	0/0	0/1	0/0
Top score	81	28	81	28
Balls bowled	40,037	9,584	62,044	12,730
Wickets	704	269	1,193	358
Bowling average	26.45	29.22	24.25	28.57
5 wickets in innings	32	2	56	2
10 wickets in match	3	0	6	0
Best bowling	7/42	5/23	7/19	5/23
Catches/stumpings	107/–	53/–	175/-	68/–
Medal record
Men's Cricket
Representing England
ICC T20 World Cup
Winner	2010 West Indies
ICC Champions Trophy
Runner-up	2004 England
Runner-up	2013 England and Wales
- Source: ESPNcricinfo, 27 September 2026

Sir James Michael "Jimmy" Anderson (born 30 July 1982) is an English cricketer who played for England from 2002 to 2024. He was serving as the fast-bowling mentor of the England cricket team and continued to play for Lancashire until 2026. He then joined Surrey for the 2027 County Championship season.

Widely regarded as one of the greatest bowlers in the history of the sport, he holds the record for the most wickets taken by a fast bowler in Test cricket (704) and third most wickets in international cricket (991).

Anderson was a member of the England team that won the ICC Men's T20 World Cup in 2010. In February 2023, he became the oldest player to top the ICC men's Test bowling rankings. He is one of the few fast bowlers (after Maurice Tate in 1935 and Gubby Allen in 1948) to play at Test match level into his forties.

Anderson made his Test debut in 2003, played for England's One-Day International (ODI) team between 2002 and 2015, and played for England's Twenty20 International (T20I) team between 2007 and 2009. On the occasion of England's 1,000th Test in 2018, Anderson was named in the country's greatest all-time Test XI by the England and Wales Cricket Board. Between 2016 and 2023, he had six spells as the top-rated Test bowler in the world according to the ICC men's player rankings.

Anderson plays as a right-arm fast-medium swing bowler, though in his early days as a cricketer he was regarded as a fast swing bowler. Among fast bowlers, he is the leading Test wicket-taker of all-time, being the first fast bowler to take 600 or more Test wickets, and in March 2024 he became the first fast bowler to take 700 wickets, and is England's record Test wicket-taker. He has played the most Test matches for England, and the second most of any cricketer, behind Sachin Tendulkar. He is also England's highest wicket-taker in One Day Internationals with 269. As a batter, he shares with Joe Root the world record for highest tenth-wicket partnership in Tests (198). He retired from international cricket on 12 July 2024.

Anderson released his autobiography, Finding The Edge, in 2024.

== Early and personal life ==
James Anderson was a pupil at St Mary's and St Theodore's RC High School in Burnley. He played cricket at Burnley Cricket Club from a young age. At weekends and during the school holidays, he was scorer for the club's second XI, of which his father, Michael, was the captain. His childhood dream was to be a cricketer, and at the age of 17, after a growth spurt, Anderson was one of the fastest bowlers in the Lancashire League.

He stated "I've always bowled seam, but when I was about 17 I don't know what it was but I just started bowling fast all of a sudden". He is a football fan who supports his home-town team Burnley. Anderson also worked in Burnley's ticket office on a part-time basis when he was younger.

In 2006, he married Daniella Lloyd, a model he met in 2004 while on England duty in London; he stated that marriage has made him "a much happier person". The couple have two daughters.

=== Fashion design ===
Anderson ventured into fashion design in 2012, designing for Evisu Jeans, with proceeds of the sale going to his sponsored charity, Nordoff-Robbins. Anderson also agreed to be the face of British hair styling brand Hairbond in June 2013. In April 2014, he launched his first collection with London-based menswear brand, Chess London. He has stated that he would like to be "the first cricketer to become a designer". He launched his own menswear brand in late October 2014, and has been working in conjunction with British watchmaker Harold Pinchbeck to release a watch since 2015.

=== Media ===
Anderson became the first cricketer to model naked for Attitude, "Britain's biggest-selling gay magazine", in September 2010. He stated, "If there are any gay cricketers, they should feel confident enough to come out, because I don't think there is any homophobia in cricket".

== Domestic career ==
Anderson made his competitive debut for the Lancashire Cricket Board in a List A one-day match against Suffolk in the 2000 NatWest Trophy, where he claimed the wicket of Russell Catley as his first competitive wicket. Anderson later made his first-class debut for Lancashire in 2002; he played 13 matches and took 50 wickets at an average of 22.28, including three five-wicket hauls. He took his maiden first-class wicket in May 2002, dismissing Ian Ward. He was awarded the NBC Denis Compton Award for Lancashire's Most Promising Young County Player in the 2002 season. In 2003, Anderson became the youngest player to take a hat-trick for Lancashire, just a week before his Test match debut against Zimbabwe; it was the first hat-trick at Old Trafford in eight years. In a match against Worcestershire in May 2004, Anderson recorded his maiden first-class ten-wicket haul.

2005 was Anderson's first full season for Lancashire. He was propelled into the England team soon after his Lancashire debut and had returned to rediscover his form after winter tours with England, where he had spent most of his time on the sidelines; when given a chance for England, he often experienced complications with bowling, due to a lack of match practice. He finished the season with 60 first-class wickets at an average of 30.21 and 27 one-day wickets at an average of 22.00.

Anderson was prevented from playing much for Lancashire in the 2006 season by a stress fracture of the back sustained in early May. He played in only two matches for Lancashire, and at one point, the Lancashire Cricket Board considered sending Anderson to play for Glamorgan to prove his fitness; however, Lancashire decided they would rather have Anderson play for them, even if only in a limited capacity. In the only first-class match he played for Lancashire that season, he was limited to three four-over spells by the ECB, which was wary of him getting injured again.

In 2008, after the Test and One-Day series against South Africa ended at the beginning of September, Anderson was unavailable to play for Lancashire for the rest of the season. He finished the season with 20 first-class wickets at 7.75 for Lancashire.

At the start of the 2009 English cricket season, Anderson took career-best match figures in a first-class match with 11/109 against Sussex as Lancashire won by 8 wickets. It was the only first-class match he played for Lancashire before being called into the England squad for a series against the West Indies. As of 26 April 2009, Anderson had taken 188 wickets at 24.37 from 48 first-class matches with Lancashire, and 66 wickets at 21.78 in 44 list A matches.

In 2025, Anderson marked his return to play T20 cricket for Lancashire against Glamorgan in what was nearly an 11-year wait. He took figures of 3–17 in four overs as Lancashire went on to win the game.

On 12 December 2025, it was announced that Anderson would be Lancashire's red-ball captain for the 2026 County Championship season.

In April 2026, at the age of 43, Anderson took his 56th five-wicket haul in a first-class innings, matching the tally of Richie Benaud, John Snow, and Ravi Ashwin.

Despite finishing the 2026 season as Lancashire's leading wicket taker with 50 wickets at an average of 17.68, and being named the club's Championship Player of the Year, Anderson was not offered a new contract for 2027, ending his 25-year association with the club. Anderson expressed disappointment at the decision, saying, "If it was up to me it wouldn't have ended like this." He has not ruled out continuing playing for other counties.

== Franchise career ==
Following his retirement from test cricket, he expressed a wish to play in franchise T20 competitions. He was signed by Manchester Super Giants (Note: Then known as Manchester Originals) as a Wildcard for the Hundred and made his debut in August 2025.

== International career ==
=== 2002–03: World Cup, Zimbabwe and South Africa ===
When Anderson was selected for the England one-day squad, he had played only five List A matches, taking 23 wickets at an average of 26.75. At the age of 20, he made his ODI debut on 15 December 2002 against Australia at Melbourne. He opened the bowling and recorded figures of 1/46 from six overs. His debut came before he was even awarded his County cap, which occurred in 2003. He showed good promise in this series – a three-team tournament also including Sri Lanka – which earned him a place in the 2003 World Cup squad. It was here that he really broke into international cricket with a match-winning spell against Pakistan, where he took four wickets in a day/night game to collect the Man of the Match award. In what proved to be England's last match of the tournament he conceded 12 runs off the penultimate over against eventual world champions Australia, and England lost a closely fought contest.

In the summer of 2003, he made his first Test cricket appearance against Zimbabwe at Lord's, and took five wickets in an innings on debut, becoming the 42nd Englishman to do so. His success continued in the subsequent One-Day tournaments against Pakistan (against whom he took a hat-trick at The Oval), South Africa and Zimbabwe. His hat-trick against Pakistan, the first by an English bowler in an ODI, claimed the wickets of Abdul Razzaq, Shoaib Akhtar and Mohammad Sami.

The Test series against South Africa dented Anderson's reputation as England's golden boy; in a series England drew 2–2 after coming from behind, Anderson finished the five-match series with 15 wickets at an average of 39.86. His best figures of 5/102 came at Trent Bridge in the third Test where he used movement of the seam to claim his second five-wicket haul in his fifth Test. Although Anderson was England's lead wicket taker, Graeme Smith – the South African captain – particularly punished Anderson's bowling, taking 157 runs at a strike rate of 90.23 off his bowling in the series and only being dismissed once. In August, despite a mixed series against South Africa, Anderson was named Young Cricketer of the Year; he became the first player to be unanimously voted for the award. In September, Anderson was awarded a central contract with the ECB. He suffered from a niggling knee injury and fatigue as the season wore on; the knee injury – to a tendon on the outside of his left knee – meant he was rested for the winter tour of Bangladesh. After the South Africa series and some good performances by other bowlers during the Bangladesh tour, Anderson admitted that he was no longer an automatic choice for England.

Anderson has an unusual bowling action. At the moment of delivery, he has his head down, eyes closed, and does not look where he is bowling; he attempted to bowl with his head up but found that he lost pace in doing so, so reverted to his original action. In 2003, ex-England pace bowler Bob Willis said Anderson would only be able to play for five years with his action. Between 2004 and 2005, the England coaching staff attempted to alter Anderson's bowling action. Anderson was selected in the One-Day and Test squads for the winter tour of Sri Lanka, but injuries left him able to play in only one of the three Tests on that tour. He was wicketless in his sole appearance, finishing with figures of 0/85.

=== 2004–05: West Indies, Zimbabwe and Pakistan ===
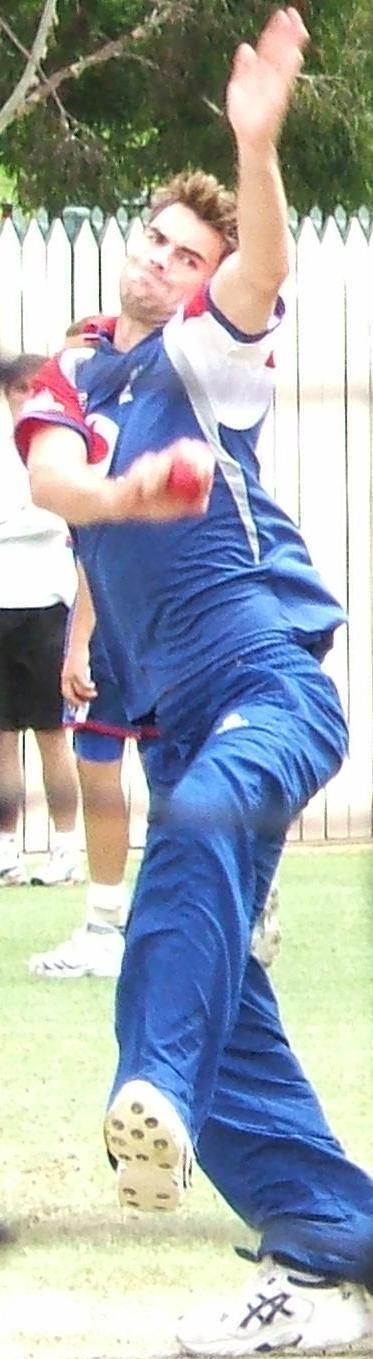
Anderson bowls in the Adelaide Oval nets during England's tour of Australia in 2006/7.

Although fit and included in both the Test and one-day squads for the tour of the West Indies, Anderson did not play in the Test series, having been superseded by players such as James Kirtley. He did feature in the ODI series which England drew 2–2, playing in four matches and taking 4 wickets at an average of 37.00; in the final match of the series, Anderson took his 50th ODI wicket, that of Chris Gayle for 41. After the ODI series against the West Indies, Anderson had 50 wickets from 31 ODIs at an average of 23.78.

Anderson retained his place in the Test squad, and his next big break came when an injury to Simon Jones forced the Welshman out of the last three Tests of the 2004 summer series against the West Indies. Despite being in the team, Anderson's bowling was used infrequently. It was clear now that Anderson had not only lost all his form and rhythm but consequentially all his confidence. A performance by a resurgent Anderson in the final Test of the summer prompted speculation that he had regained his confidence and would return to the top of his game. He was selected for the winter tour to Zimbabwe and South Africa. Much of the post-season talk, however, was dominated by the debate over whether to go on tour to Zimbabwe. England eventually did end up in Harare, after a brief stopover in Namibia. Anderson once again struggled in his three One-Day appearances. The England management, however, continued to show faith in his ability.

Travelling as a barely-used reserve on the winter South Africa tour while seemingly struggling for form, Anderson was given another shot at redemption, after Simon Jones was dropped for the third Test after a poor performance in the second. Anderson, though, did even worse than Jones, collecting figures of 2/117 and 0/32 in his two innings. Anderson spent the following summer with Lancashire; bowling regularly a quota of overs one would associate with a new ball bowler, something he had not done enough in his England stint. He was recalled to the England squad for the last match of the 2005 Ashes series after taking 60 wickets for Lancashire in 2005, once again as a replacement for the injured Jones, but all-rounder Paul Collingwood was selected for the team.

Anderson was selected in the Test squad for the tour of Pakistan, but spinner Shaun Udal was chosen to fill the bowler's spot left empty by the still-injured Simon Jones. When Ashley Giles had to miss the third Test due to injury, young Durham debutant seamer Liam Plunkett was chosen ahead of Anderson, and Anderson did not play a single Test on the tour. Despite this disappointment he played in all five of England's One-Day games in Pakistan, showing improvements in form to be England's joint-leading wicket-taker in the series with Andrew Flintoff, taking 7 wickets at 25.57.

=== 2006: India and Australia ===
Anderson was not selected for the senior team's tour to India in January 2006 as Simon Jones returned from injury and was chosen ahead of him. Instead, Anderson was selected for England A's tour of the West Indies. In February, days before the start of the first A-match between England and the West Indies, Anderson (along with batsmen Alastair Cook and Owais Shah) was called up as an injury reinforcement to the England senior squad in India, after captain Michael Vaughan and fast bowler Simon Jones flew home with knee injuries and vice-captain Marcus Trescothick departed for undisclosed "personal" reasons. After an unconvincing display by Liam Plunkett in the second Test in Mohali, Anderson was recalled for the final match of the series. He impressed in England's victory, taking figures of 4/40 in the first innings.

After his impressive display in the final match in India, Anderson looked likely to feature as one of England's main bowlers in both the ODI series and Test matches against Pakistan and Sri Lanka; however, an early season stress fracture of the back ruled Anderson out for all of the summer internationals and all but two matches of his county season. Lancashire teammate Sajid Mahmood was called up to the England squad as the replacement for Anderson.

Anderson was named in England's Champions Trophy and Ashes squads in September 2006 although at that point he had not played any first-class cricket in six months. He was straight back into England colours for the 0–5 Ashes whitewash against Australia. His performance, like much of the England team, was well below standard. Anderson was sent home midway through the One-Day tournament with Australia and New Zealand as a precaution when he felt a twinge in his back; during the tournament he had begun to regain some of his form and in the four matches he played he took 8 wickets at an average of 20.62.

=== 2007: World Cup ===
Although Anderson was returned home early from England's victorious ODI series in Australia, Anderson was selected in England's squad for the 2007 Cricket World Cup. He recovered from his back injury and was expected to play ahead of the likes of Liam Plunkett, Sajid Mahmood, and Jon Lewis. However, on 14 March 2007, only days before England's first game, it was reported by the BBC that Anderson had broken his finger during fielding practice and his involvement in the tournament was in question, although he was able to play despite the pain.

=== 2007: West Indies, India and Sri Lanka ===
When Peter Moores replaced Duncan Fletcher as England coach after the World Cup, it was felt that Anderson would benefit under new management; along with the rest of the England team, he was allowed to play more for his county. It was felt that it was not beneficial for players who were not representing England to just sit on the sideline and match practice would allow him to rediscover his form. Anderson did not feature in the Test series against the West Indies, but he did play in the ODI series. During the second ODI, he clashed with Runako Morton when he appeared to get in the way of Morton when the batsman was running between the wickets. Anderson was fined half of his match fee for the incident and match referee Mike Procter stated "James Anderson is not a player with a reputation for bad behaviour ... and I am sure he will do everything he can to ensure there is no repeat of this unfortunate incident". Anderson finished the series with five wickets at 30.40 as England lost the series 2–1.

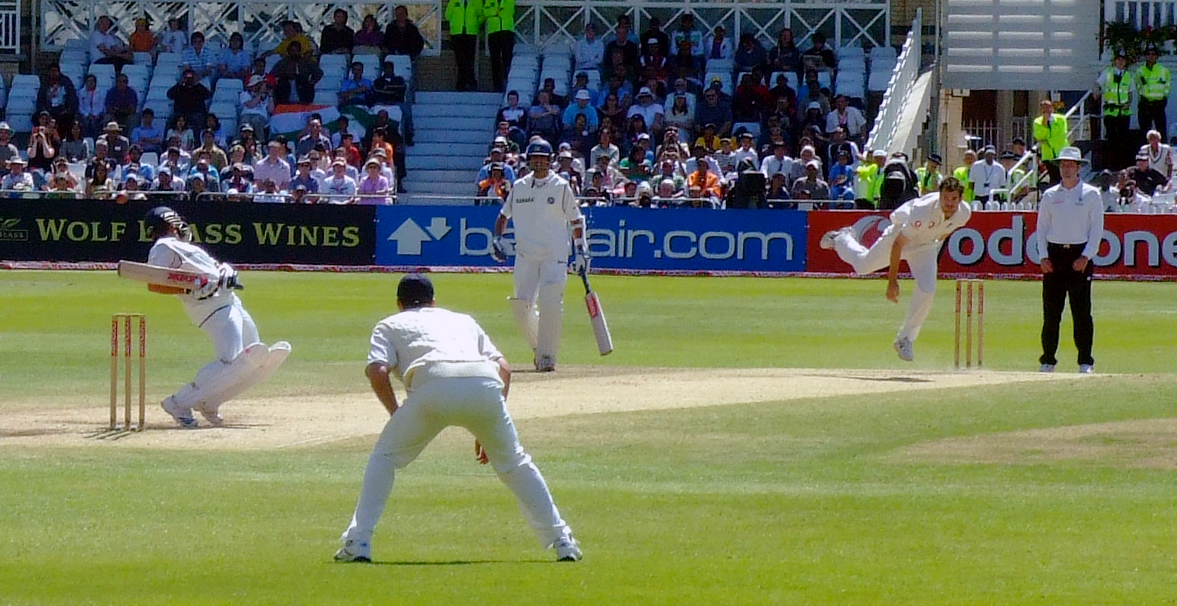
Anderson bowling during the second Test of India's tour of England in 2007. He opened the bowling with Ryan Sidebottom.

Anderson played in all three Tests of the series with India, coming into the team for the injured Matthew Hoggard and leading a pace attack comprising himself, Ryan Sidebottom and Chris Tremlett with only 20 caps between them. In the first Test of the series, Anderson claimed his 50th Test wicket when he dismissed Mahendra Singh Dhoni for 0; the feat was achieved in Anderson's 17th Test match and after the match he had 53 wickets at an average of 35.67. He became the first England bowler to dismiss Rahul Dravid, Sachin Tendulkar and Sourav Ganguly in the same innings. Although England lost the series, Anderson demonstrated greater consistency than before and managed 14 wickets, at 35.57 and getting the Man of the Series award. He also managed to get his name on the honours board at Lord's for the second time with his best Test figures of 5/42. The ODI series which followed was England's first ODI series win at home in three years. Anderson was the leading wicket-taker of either team with 14 wickets at an average of 22.57. In the first ODI of the series, Anderson claimed his 100th ODI wicket when he dismissed Gautam Gambhir for 3; after the match, he had taken 103 wickets from 70 matches at an average of 27.02. Anderson was also included for the England squad for the World Twenty20, held in September 2007, replacing an injured Ravi Bopara. He played in all four of England's matches, taking three wickets at 34.00, as England failed to progress beyond the second stage of the competition. Following a successful summer, he was one of twelve players awarded a central contract for 2007/08 by the ECB.

Anderson was part of the squad which toured Sri Lanka in the winter. The One-Day team completed their first-ever series victory in Sri Lanka; Anderson's contribution was four wickets in five matches at an average of 48.25 and tying down Sri Lanka's top order along with Sidebottom and Stuart Broad, although they finished with more wickets at a lower average. Despite suffering a bruised left ankle, Anderson was selected for the first Test. Although he bowled economically in the first innings, he was expensive in the second; during the course of the second innings he became only the second bowler in Test cricket to have six boundaries taken off a single over. He finished the match with figures of two wickets for 167 runs and was dropped for the final two Tests; his replacement was debutant Stuart Broad.

=== 2008: New Zealand, South Africa and India ===
In the spring of 2008, Anderson toured New Zealand with England. He played in the Twenty20 series, which England won 2–0, and he was then involved in the one-day series which New Zealand won 3–2. Although he played in all five matches of the One-Day series, he struggled and only managed four wickets at an average of 67.50. In an effort to regain some form, Anderson was allowed to join Auckland Cricket Club, who were lacking their strike bowlers due to international call-ups, as an overseas player. The move was controversial with critics including Gavin Larsen, Wellington Cricket Club's chief executive, who feared that Anderson would be able to bowl himself into form. Although he was left out for the first Test, Anderson was recalled for the second when he and Stuart Broad replaced the out-of-form Steve Harmison and Matthew Hoggard after England were defeated by 189 runs; the decision to axe both bowlers was heralded as the end of an era in English cricket. Anderson's selection was a surprise as it was expected that Broad would replace Harmison, but not that Hoggard would be dropped. In the first innings of the second Test, Anderson took 5/73 and finished with match figures of 7/130 and helped England to a 126-run victory. He sustained an ankle injury while playing football before the third Test but recovered in time to be selected. Anderson's performance in the final Test was less effective, recording match figures of 1/153 as England won the match by 121 runs and the series 2–1. Searching for consistency, Anderson's action reverted to the action he used in 2003, one with which he felt comfortable.

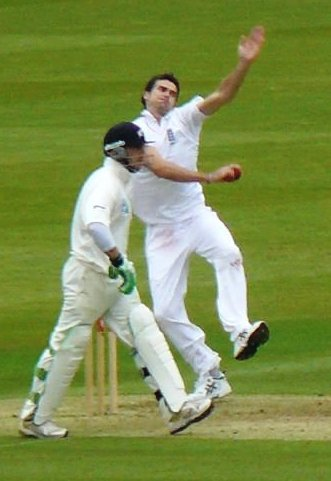
Anderson bowling against New Zealand in England

He was retained for the home series when New Zealand toured England later in 2008. He continued to enjoy success against the touring team, taking 19 wickets at 19.31 and finishing as the leading wicket-taker of the series. This was his highest return of wickets in a series. Anderson bowled well in the first Test, recording match figures of 130/5 as the match was drawn. In the second Test, Anderson finished with match figures of 5/139 as England won by six wickets; on the first day, he struck New Zealand batsman Daniel Flynn in the face, knocking out a tooth, in a spell of short, aggressive bowling when he also hit Jacob Oram on the helmet. Anderson was disconcerted by injuring Flynn said that striking him "wasn't pleasant". In the final match of the series Anderson scored a career Test best of 28 in a partnership of 76 with Stuart Broad. This was followed up by career best bowling of 7/43 in the first innings and Test best match figures of 9/98 overall as he won the Man of the Match award and England secured an innings and nine run victory and a 2–0 series win. Anderson's performance in the series prompted England bowling coach Ottis Gibson to say that Anderson has the potential to become a world-class bowler if he can improve his self-belief. In the One-Day series that followed Anderson managed five wickets from five matches at an average of 41.40 as England lost the series 3–1.

After the Test series against New Zealand, Anderson's figures revealed that he struggled to bowl to left-handed batsmen and his contrasting fortunes between the start of his career and his resurgence. By the end of June 2008, Anderson had played 25 Test matches; in the 16 Tests before July 2007 he took 46 wickets at an average of 38.39, but since then in 9 Tests he took 43 wickets at 30.58 at a much lower strike rate. In the five Tests Anderson played against New Zealand in a four-month period, 22 of the 27 wickets he managed were against right-handed batsmen. Against the right-handers he averaged 20.77 compared to 38.60 against left-handers. This was an improvement however on his career statistics, since he averaged 70 wickets at 29.11 against right-handers and 19 at 54.94 against left-handers. This first became clear in the 2003 Test series against South Africa when Graeme Smith and Gary Kirsten milked him for 276 runs while only being dismissed once between them.

Anderson's batting showed a marked improvement in the summer's home Test series against South Africa. In the second innings of the second Test, at Headingley, Anderson scored a Test-career best 34 runs, having come to the crease as a nightwatchman late on Day 3. In the course of his innings he was struck on the wrist and then on the grille of his helmet by Dale Steyn.

In the final match of the series, Anderson took his 100th Test wicket. The landmark wicket was that of Jacques Kallis Leg Before Wicket for 2; This feat was achieved in Anderson's 29th Test and after the match he had 104 wickets at an average of 34.51.

England's subsequent One-Day series against India was cut short due to terror attacks in Mumbai. Of the five out of seven matches completed, all of which England had lost, Anderson bowled in the first four but did not take any wickets.

=== 2009: West Indies ===
Following the sacking of Peter Moores in January 2009, and the replacement of Kevin Pietersen by Andrew Strauss as England captain, England left for a tour to the West Indies.

Following two low-key performances in the warm-up matches against a St. Kitts XI and West Indies A, Anderson was dropped for the first Test in Jamaica. Surprisingly, the West Indies inflicted a large defeat on England, following a third innings batting collapse. With the form of Ryan Sidebottom a cause for concern, and some doubts over his fitness, Anderson was recalled for the second Test at the Sir Vivian Richards Stadium in Antigua. However, this match was abandoned with fewer than two overs bowled due to an unfit outfield. The Test match was rearranged to take place two days later at the Antigua Recreation Ground. After making 4 as a night-watchman during England's first innings, Anderson bowled 19 wicketless overs as the West Indies were bowled out for 285, although he did take the catch of Chris Gayle off Steve Harmison. After making 20, again as night-watchman, in the second batting innings, England fell one wicket short of bowling the West Indies out and securing a Test victory as the tail-enders of Daren Powell and Fidel Edwards survived 10 overs to bat out the draw.

After sitting out the tour match against the BCA President's XI in Barbados, England and the West Indies played the fourth Test at the Kensington Oval. Both teams found bowling difficult on a very flat track, and the first two innings produced 1,349 runs for the loss of just 15 wickets. England batted first and made 600/6 declared, and Anderson again opened the bowling in the West Indies reply. After striking early to dismiss Chris Gayle LBW on a referral, he also dismissed Shivnarine Chanderpaul and Sulieman Benn, finishing with 3 for 125 from 37 overs. With England batting out the match, Anderson did not feature again as the Test match was drawn. With England still 1–0 down in a series they were expected by many to win comfortably, victory was needed in the fifth and final Test at Queen's Park Oval in Trinidad. After England made 546/6 declared, Anderson again struggled as the West Indies were bowled out for 544, a deficit of 2 runs, with Anderson picking up the wicket of wicket-keeper Dinesh Ramdin for 70 runs, with an economy of just 2.18, one of his best in Test cricket. With England setting the West Indies a target of 240 runs to win, Anderson had arguably his best innings of the tour. After dismissing opener Lendl Simmons, Anderson bowled 16 overs of reverse swing, picking up two more wickets as again England fell just short of victory, this time by two wickets.

With the Test series lost, England were keen to regain some honour in the T20 and ODIs which remained. After taking 3 for 48 in 8 overs in a warm-up match against the WIPA President's Select XI, Anderson led the England attack in the T20 International. Despite finishing with decent figures of 1–19 in 3 overs, England were beaten soundly. The first One-Day International, however, saw England inflict their first defeat on the West Indies of the tour. After posting 270 for 7 in their 50 overs, Rain interrupted the West Indies' reply, leading to the result being decided on the Duckworth–Lewis method. With the light fading, Anderson succeeded in having Kieron Pollard caught on the boundary by Steve Harmison. Due to the intricacies of the Duckworth Lewis method, this wicket ensured England won the match by a single run.

In the next two ODIs, England suffered two more defeats, with Anderson taking 3 for 37 from 9 overs in the second ODI, as well as making 8 with the bat, and went on to take 1 for 39 from 5 overs and 0 not out as England fell 2–1 behind in the five-match series. England therefore needed to win the fourth ODI in Barbados to keep the series alive. Bowling first, England restricted the West Indies to 239/9 in their 50 overs, with Anderson himself taking the wicket of Fidel Edwards to finish with figures of 1 for 41 with 1 maiden in the 10 he bowled. Duckworth-Lewis again helped England as they chased down 136 in 18 overs to win by nine wickets. Thus, the series was tied at 2–2 going into the final match in St. Lucia. The West Indies won the toss and elected to bowl first, with England able to post 172/5 in 29 overs (the innings shortened by rain). With 29 overs to chase 173 for victory, the West Indies lost Gayle to Anderson in the first over with the score at 1/1, Anderson going on to add the wicket of Kieron Pollard as he finished with match figures of 2/34 from 6 overs as England won the match by 26 runs, with Anderson's Lancashire teammate Andrew Flintoff taking a hat-trick.

Anderson finished the tour with 9 wickets at an average of 38.00 from the Test series, with an economy rate of 2.65 runs per over from both innings and best match figures coming in the fifth Test at Trinidad, as well as accumulating 24 runs at an average of 12.00, with a highest-score of 20. In the ODIs, Anderson took 9 wickets at 21.11 and an economy rate of 5.00 runs per over and 8 runs at an equivalent average. He then rejected offers to play in the IPL since he wanted to commit to a bright future for England over the following summer.

The Wisden Trophy was up for grabs again a few months later when the West Indies replaced Zimbabwe, who were still excluded from participating in Test match cricket by the ICC (although originally the tour had been scheduled to be played by Sri Lanka, who pulled out to allow their players to play in the IPL), in a two-Test and three-ODI tour. Anderson was selected after a bright start to the season with Lancashire, which included figures of 11–109 in a match against Sussex at Hove.

The first Test was held at Lord's, beginning on 6 May 2009. Anderson was not involved directly until the second day, with England batting first, but made only a single in a 19-ball innings. With the wicket showing a green tinge and some cloud cover, Anderson was expected to excel. However he struggled to find his length bowling in the first innings and finished wicketless from seven overs having conceded 32. An improvement in the second innings saw him take the first two wickets after the follow-on, including that of the West Indies captain Chris Gayle, and finishing with figures of 2–38 from 15 overs and match figures of 2–70 as England won by ten wickets.

From Lord's, the teams moved to Chester-le-Street for the second and final Test of the series. England again won the toss and chose to bat, and proceeded to dominate the West Indies bowling attack, amassing 569–6 declared. Anderson was sent in at the end of the first day in his role as night-watchman to protect Pietersen. Batting with Alastair Cook, they made a partnership of 44, Anderson hitting 14 of them to extend his run of innings without a duck in Test cricket. Later on day three, he was given the ball as England set out to take 20 West Indian wickets and secure match victory. Anderson found some significant swing in the cloudy conditions there, and proceeded to skittle through the West Indies top order, taking the first three wickets (including Gayle again) and leaving the West Indies on 68/3. Two late strikes secured Anderson a five-wicket haul, his first in 19 innings since his 7-wicket haul against New Zealand at Trent Bridge the previous summer. Anderson went on to take 4 further wickets after the West Indies were asked to follow-on (for the second time in the series) and England went on to win by an innings and 83 runs. With nine wickets in the match for 125 runs, Anderson was named the Man of the Match, only the second time in his career he had achieved this in a Test match.

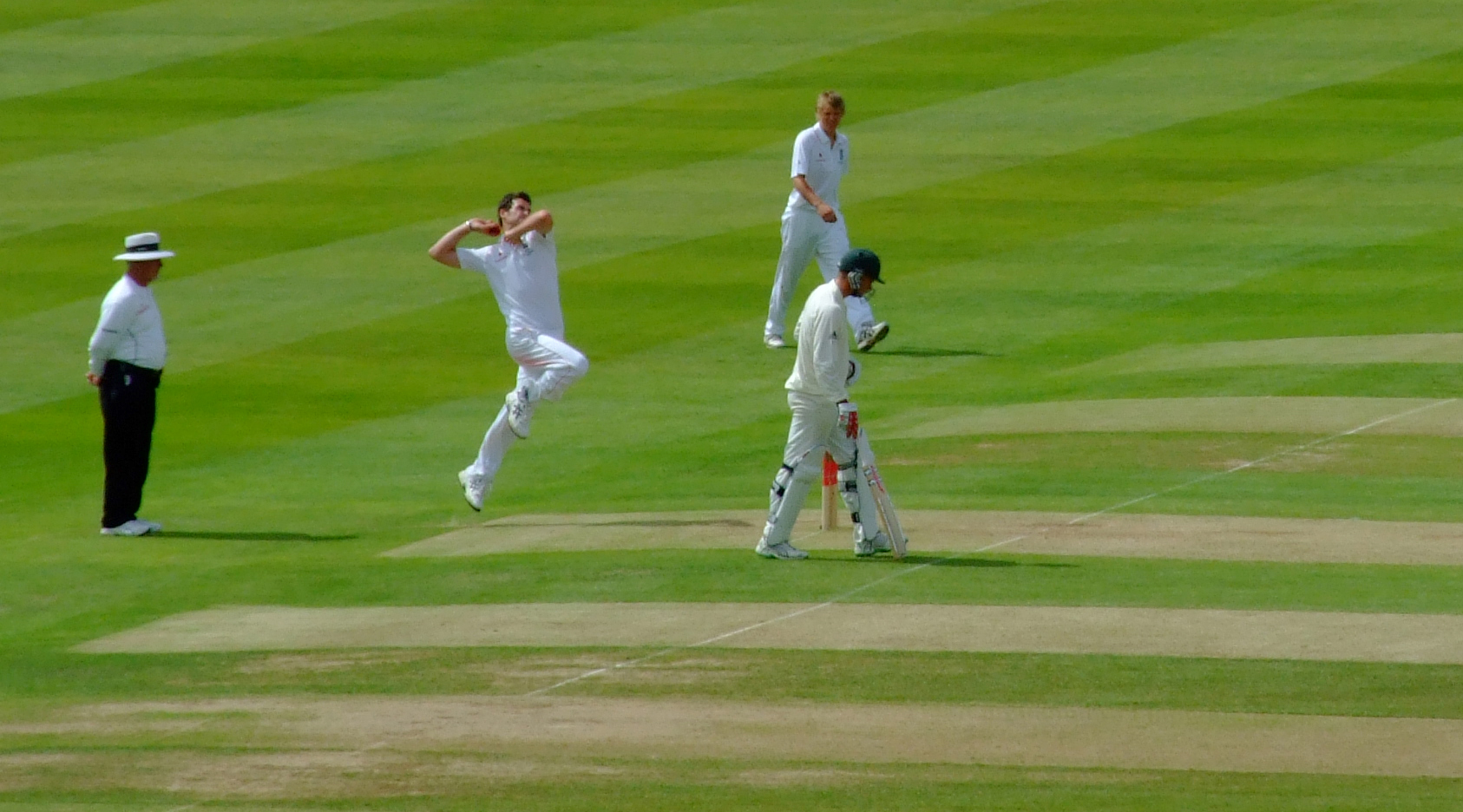
Anderson bowling at Edgbaston during the 2009 Ashes

The first match of the following ODI series at Headingley was abandoned due to heavy rain, leaving two One-Day matches to be played. Anderson was named in the England squad for the series, and was selected for both matches. In the first match at Bristol, he bowled six overs for nineteen, with one maiden, but finished wicketless as the West Indies were bowled out for 160. England went on to win the match by six wickets, meaning Anderson was not needed to bat. Neither was he required to bat in the last match of the tour as England scored 328/7 from their 50 overs. Although Anderson went at a run a ball in reply, conceding 58 from 9.4 overs, he took three wickets including the last of the match (that of Sulieman Benn) as the West Indies fell 58 runs short, sealing a 2–0 victory for England in both the Test and ODI series.

=== 2009–10: South Africa ===
Anderson went on the tour of South Africa as one of the leaders of the English attack, having established himself in all formats of the game. In the opening T20 International, Anderson failed to pick up a wicket, although he was fairly economical, going at 8 runs an over. Anderson improved in the following match, bowling 4 for 28 runs, picking up a wicket. He was the pick of the English bowlers as South Africa won the match, posting over 200. Anderson bowled well in the ODI series, picking up regular wickets. He claimed 3–60 in the second ODI, and 5–23 in the fourth match. The four-match Test series was drawn 1–1, with Anderson bowling well. He picked up 5 wickets for 63 runs during the 3rd Test, as well as 4–73 in the opening match.

=== 2010: Bangladesh and Pakistan ===
Anderson was selected in the England squad for the 2010 ICC World T20, despite not being regarded as a specialist in this format of cricket. He did not play in the opening group match against the West Indies. With England playing well in the tournament, and with the three-man seam attack of Stuart Broad, Ryan Sidebottom and Tim Bresnan performing, Anderson could not break into the team. England went on to win the tournament, beating Australia in the final.

England faced Bangladesh in a two-match Test series. England were expected to win easily and cruised to victory in the first Test, with Anderson taking figures of 4–78 and 1–84. Anderson also played in the second Test, finishing with figures of 1–45 and 3–16. England won the series 2–0. Anderson played in the first ODI, but was expensive, taking figures of 3–74. He was wicketless in the second game as England suffered a shock defeat. Anderson did not play in the decider, which England won to take the series.

England then played Pakistan at home. It was during this series that Anderson established himself as one of the world's best Test bowlers. In the first match he took 5–54 and 6–17 which England won. This left Anderson with match figures of 11–71. He helped England win the second Test, achieving figures of 4–20 in the first innings. Anderson continued to impress in the final two Tests continuing to be economical and providing a wicket-taking threat. Anderson was rested for the first ODI, but returned in the second, taking 1–36 in ten overs. He then took 3–26 in the third match, before playing the remaining matches of the series. Although Anderson struggled to take wickets, his economical bowling frustrated the opposition and kept the run rate down. By the end of the tour, Anderson had established himself as the leader of the England attack, with his swing bowling making him one of the most feared bowlers in the world.

=== 2010–11: Australia ===
As expected, Anderson was selected in the England squad to play Australia, where he developed his own wobble-seam delivery to combat the Kookaburra ball that doesn't swing as much for as long. Anderson played well in the opening tour games and took two wickets in the opening Test match, which finished as a draw. In the second Test England thrashed Australia, winning by an innings and 71 runs. Anderson took 4–51 in the first innings and Australia were never able to recover. England lost the third Test, but Anderson still impressed taking 4 wickets. Anderson took 4–44 in the fourth Test, which England won to retain the Ashes. He then took 4–66 and 3–61 as England won the fifth Test and series 3–1. During the series Anderson became the second youngest England bowler to claim 200 Test wickets. Anderson was rested at the start of the ODI series, but with England struggling he was recalled, taking 2–57 in the third match. In the sixth match Anderson took 1–91 of his ten overs as the England team struggled. Anderson took 3–48 in the final match of the series, but it was not enough to prevent another defeat as England lost the one-day series 6–1.

=== 2011: World Cup, Sri Lanka and India ===
Anderson was selected in the squad for the 2011 World Cup and played in the opening game against the Netherlands. He was involved in the dramatic tie against India, where both teams posted 338, and also played as England suffered an embarrassing defeat against Ireland. His best match of the tournament came when he helped England defend 171 against South Africa, where he bowled six overs, collecting figures of 2–16. He was left out of the team against the West Indies, which England won. Anderson did not appear in England's final match against Sri Lanka, in which they lost by ten wickets and so bowed out at the quarter-final stage of the competition. Overall, Anderson had a disappointing tournament, although the pitches did not suit his style of bowling being unable to get the ball to swing.

Anderson was part of the England team when Sri Lanka toured in 2011. Anderson took 3–66 in the first innings but was unable to bowl in the second due to an injury. England won the first Test after Sri Lanka collapsed for 82 all out in the second innings. Anderson was ruled out of the second Test through injury but returned for the third, taking figures of 2–56 and 2–81 as England drew the match, but won the series 1–0. Anderson took 4–18 in the first ODI but was wicketless in the second match. In the fourth match he returned to his best, taking 3–24. In the final match he took 2–55, helping England to a series win.

England's next opponents were India. England needed to win the four match series by two games to overtake India in the world rankings and become the new top-ranked Test team. Anderson shone in the first Test, taking 5–65 as England took a 1–0 lead. Anderson took 5 more wickets in the second Test and a further 6 in the third as England took a 3–0 series lead. Anderson took 3 more wickets in the final Test as England won the series 4–0 and became the new world Number Ones. Following Anderson's performance, he was widely considered the premier fast bowler in the world. Anderson took 3–48 in the third ODI but was left out of the final game of the series as had already won, taking a 2–0 lead into the final match, which they also won by 6 wickets.

=== 2011–12: Pakistan and Sri Lanka ===
England toured Pakistan at the back end of 2012. The series was held in the UAE. England struggled in the conditions and slumped to a heavy defeat in the first Test, with Anderson largely ineffectual. England again lost the second Test, with poor performances from the batsmen giving the bowlers little to work with. Anderson took his best figures of the tour, 3–35 in the final match of the series, but it wasn't enough to prevent a whitewash for Pakistan. After the series, England moved on to Sri Lanka for a two-match Test series. Anderson took 5–72 in the first innings but it wasn't enough to prevent a fourth straight defeat for England. Anderson was praised for his performance in conditions which did not favour seam bowlers. England won the final Test to level the series, with Anderson taking figures of 4–98 in the match. As a result of his performances, Anderson was named England Cricketer of the Year.

=== 2012: West Indies and South Africa ===
In the second Test against West Indies, Anderson took 4–43 at Trent Bridge, a ground where he always performed due to the swing-friendly conditions. With England taking a 2–0 series lead, Anderson was rested for the final match of the series to help him avoid burnout. Anderson played in the ODI series against the West Indies, taking 2–38 in the second match. England then played Australia in 5 ODIs. Anderson took 2–55 in the first match, and 2–34 in the fourth match. There were suggestions that Anderson would play no part in the series, both to rest him and to deprive Australia of facing him ahead of the Ashes series the following year. However, despite this, Anderson played a key part in the series.

England faced South Africa at the end of the summer, with their Number One ranking on the line. The series was also anticipated as a chance to see Anderson go head to head with Dale Steyn, regarded as the world's two best seam bowlers. The series was a disappointment for England. They lost the first Test by an innings, with Anderson managing figures of 1–116. The second Test was a tighter affair, with the match ending in a draw, but Anderson could only manage three wickets in the match. England lost the third Test, meaning a 2–0 series defeat, and South Africa earned their place at the top of the Test rankings. Anderson took 4–44 in the third ODI, and 2–41 in the fifth as the series ended as 2–2 draw. This was seen as a positive result for England, with several young players being blooded against an experienced South African team.

=== 2012–13: India, New Zealand and Champions Trophy ===
Following the defeat to South Africa, Andrew Strauss retired and was replaced as captain by Alistair Cook. The first series under the leadership of Cook was against India. England lost the first Test by 9 wickets, with Anderson taking just one wicket in the match. England won the second Test convincingly, but Anderson again struggled in conditions more suited to spinners. Anderson performed much better in the third Test, taking six wickets overall. Anderson took the wicket of Sachin Tendulkar in the 1st innings of the third Test to equal Muttiah Muralitharan as the most successful bowler against Tendulkar with a total of eight dismissals. With England needing just a draw to win the series in the final Test, Anderson took 4–81 to help England draw the match and win the series 2–1.

In the tour of New Zealand, Anderson returned to the ODI team. In February 2013 during England's loss of the 1st One day international in New Zealand, with the wicket of BJ Watling, his 529th in international cricket, Anderson overtook Ian Botham to become England's all-time highest wicket-taker. He took 5–34 in the second match as England went on to win the series. Anderson took 4–137 in the first Test and went on to take wickets in every innings in the series. The series itself finished 0–0, with the batsmen dominating on good batting wickets.

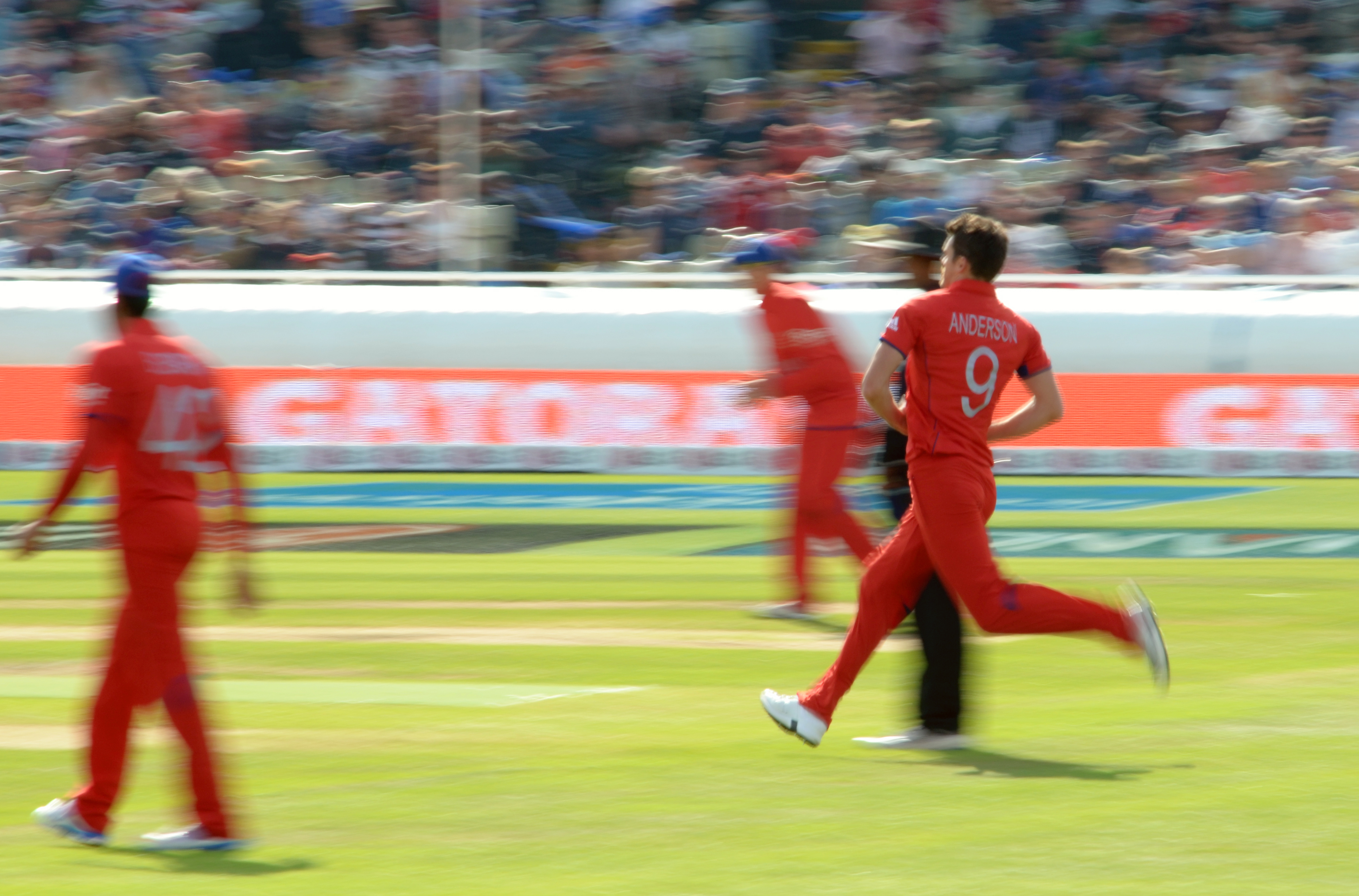
Anderson bowling during the Champions Trophy match in which he became England's leading wicket-taker in ODIs

Anderson played a key role in the 2013 Champions Trophy. He took 3–30 against Australia as England made a winning start to their campaign. During the match ICC Champions Trophy match against Australia he became England's leading ODI wicket-taker when he took his 235th wicket. In the final Group A match he took 3–32 as England reached the semi-finals of the competition. England shocked South Africa and won by 7 wickets, with Anderson taking 2–14 off 8 overs. England played India, the favourites for the competition in the final, in what proved to be a rain interrupted match. Only being able to bowl four overs, Anderson took 1–24, but a poor batting performance meant that England lost the match and India went on to become champions.

In the opening match of the Test series against New Zealand, Anderson took match figures of 7–70. On the second day of the 1st Test against New Zealand, he became the fourth English bowler to take 300 Test wickets when he dismissed Peter Fulton. England went on to win the series 2–0. Anderson took 3–31 in the first ODI, and also played in the second match. England lost the series 2–1.

=== 2013–14: Australia ===
During the summer of 2013, England played Australia in the first of what would be back-to-back Ashes Series. The first Test of the home series was held at Trent Bridge. Despite being favourites, England struggled in the first innings, posting just 215. Anderson led the fightback, taking 5–85 as England bowled Australia out for 280. As Australia closed in on winning the match in the second innings, Anderson took 5–73, including the winning wicket. Anderson was required to bowl a long spell to win England the match, and Kevin Pietersen later posted a picture of Anderson lying exhausted on the floor. England won the second Test, although this time Anderson was less influential, taking only three wickets. Anderson was again quiet in the third Test, in which England managed to hold on to a draw following a long rain delay. Anderson took 2–65 in the fourth Test as England went 3–0 up in the series. Following the game, there was speculation Anderson would be rested for the final Test to ensure he would be fresh for the return series in Australia. However, Anderson played and took 4–95 in the first innings, as the match ended in a draw and England won the series 3–0. Anderson was rested for the ODI series as back up bowlers such as Ben Stokes and Boyd Rankin were given the chance to play.

Anderson again toured Australia as part of the 2013–14 Ashes series. It proved to be a miserable tour for Anderson and the rest of his England teammates. Anderson was ineffectual in the first Test as England lost convincingly. He took 3 wickets in the second Test but it was clear the conditions did not suit his game. In the third Test he bowled 19 wicketless overs and conceded 105 runs as England lost the series. He took 4–67 in the fourth Test but was unable to prevent defeat as the English batsmen continued to struggle. In the fifth Test Australia completed the whitewash, with Anderson taking three wickets in the match. Anderson was rested for the ODI series, which England again struggled in, losing 4–1.

=== 2014: Sri Lanka and India ===
Following the Ashes series, England played Sri Lanka at home. In the first match of the series Anderson had figures of 1–22. In the second ODI between England and Sri Lanka, Anderson took two wickets for 38 runs. He finished with figures of 2–10 in the next match as England won by 10 wickets. He took 2–60 in the next match as Sri Lanka levelled the series at 2–2. England lost the final match of the series, with Anderson finishing with figures of 1–33. After picking up figures of 3–93 in the Sri Lankan first innings, he took 4–25 in the second as England fell narrowly short of victory as the first Test ended in a draw. In the second Test, he took 2–49 in the first innings before taking 3–91 in the second. As England battled to save the Test, Anderson faced 55 balls but was dismissed on the penultimate ball of the match as England lost the match. Anderson was named England's man of the series after taking 12 wickets in the series.

On 12 July 2014, in the First Test of the series against India, Anderson and teammate Joe Root broke numerous records in England's first innings of the first Test against India at Trent Bridge. Anderson hit his maiden first-class fifty as well as posting the highest score (81 runs) by an England No 11 batsman in Test history. His innings was also the longest innings by a No 11 batsman in Test history. Timed at 230 minutes, it surpassed the previous record set by Mushtaq Ahmed in 1997 (183 minutes) by almost an hour. He and Root also set a new world record for a 10th-wicket partnership in Test cricket scoring 198 runs, beating the 163 run-partnership by Australians Phillip Hughes and Ashton Agar at Trent Bridge on 11 July 2013. Anderson and fellow bowler Stuart Broad were criticised for their performance in the second Test after failing to capitalise on a good bowling surface. Anderson finished with match figures of 5–137 as England lost the match, increasing the pressure on the team. He returned to his best in the next Test as England levelled the series as he took figures of 5–53 in the first innings and 2–24 in the second. His first-innings spell was nominated to be one of the best Test bowling performance of the year 2014 by ESPNcricinfo. In the fourth match of the series he took match figures of 5–64 as England won the match by an innings to go 2–1 up in the series. Anderson was again pivotal as England won the final match of the series, taking four wickets in the match. After the conclusion of the 5th Test, Anderson was named Man of the Series for taking 25 wickets. Anderson had a mixed ODI series against India. After the first match was abandoned, Anderson was wicket less in the first three games of the series, taking figures of 0–57, 0–29 and 0–38 as England went 3–0 down in the series. However, he bowled well in the final match of the series, taking figures of 2–39 as England won the match.

=== 2015: Tri-Series ===
Following injury, Anderson returned to the England team for the second match of the Tri-Series against India, where he had figures of 4–18 to help England win. In the next match against Australia he was wicket less as England were defeated. In the game against India, Anderson picked up figures of 1–24 to help England qualify for the final. In the final, Anderson picked up two wickets but England lost the match and finished runners-up.

=== 2015: World Cup ===
Anderson failed to take a wicket in the first match against Australia, finishing with figures of 0–67. In the next match against New Zealand he finished with figures of 0–37 as England suffered a humiliating eight wicket defeat. He took his first wickets of the tournament against Scotland as he collected figures of 2–30 as England won their first game of the tournament. He was again wicket less in England's defeat to Sri Lanka. In their must win game against Bangladesh, Anderson took figures of 2–45 but was later the last man out as England lost the game to exit the World Cup. In their final group game against Afghanistan, Anderson bowled economically, finishing with figures of 1–18 as England won their final match of the tournament.

=== 2015: West Indies and New Zealand ===
In April 2015, during the drawn first Test of the West Indies tour in Antigua in his 100th Test match, he had West Indies captain Denesh Ramdin caught at slip for his 384th Test wicket, thus overtaking another Ian Botham record and becoming England's all-time highest Test match wicket-taker. Despite Anderson's best efforts, the match ended in a draw. In the second Test Anderson took 2–47 West Indies first innings as they were bowled out for 299. His figures of 4–43 in the second innings helped England put themselves in a match winning position. They won the game by nine wickets to go 1–0 up in the series. In the final Test, Anderson took 6–42 in the West Indies first innings as England took a first innings lead. However, England collapsed in their second innings and although Anderson took a wicket in the West Indies second innings, it wasn't enough to prevent a five wicket defeat as the series ended in a 1–1 draw. He was awarded with the player of the series award.

New Zealand toured England for a 2 test and 5 ODI series. Anderson took 1–88 in New Zealand's first innings in the first Test between the two teams. In the second innings he took 1–31 as England won the match by 124 runs to go 1–0 up in the series. In the second Test he took 2–43 as New Zealand were bowled out for 350. He made an unbeaten ten with the bat to help England reach 350 and level the scores. In New Zealand's second innings he took 2–96 as New Zealand won the Test to level the series at 1–1. During the series Anderson took his 400th Test wicket and scored his 1000th Test run.

=== 2015: Australia ===
In the first Test Anderson took figures of 3–43 in Australia's first innings to help restrict them to 308, and England went on to win the game by 169 runs. In the second Test he failed to take a wicket in the whole match, finishing with figures of 0–99 in the first innings and 0–48 in the second innings as Australia won the match by 405 runs. In the third Test, Anderson took 6–47 in the Australian first innings to help restrict them to 136. He took 1–15 in the second innings but injured himself in the process. Although England won the game to go 2–1 up in the series, Anderson was ruled out of the remainder of the series through injury. England went on to win the series 3–2.

=== 2015: Pakistan ===
Anderson recovered from his injury in time for the Test series against Pakistan. In the first innings of the first Test, Anderson took figures of 2–42 and bowled economically as Pakistan were dismissed for 523. In the second innings he took figures of 2–30 as Pakistan were bowled out for 173, but England did not have enough time to force a win and the match finished in a draw. In the second Test Anderson took 1–40 in the first innings, before finishing with figures of 2–22 in Pakistan's second innings as they were dismissed for 354. However, England's batting was unable to chase down the target and the suffered a 127 run defeat. England needed to win the final Test of the series to level it, and Pakistan were dismissed cheaply for 234 in the first innings, with Anderson taking 4–17. However, they recovered in their second innings, scoring 355, despite Anderson taking 2–52. An England second innings collapse saw Pakistan win the series 2–0.

=== 2015–16: South Africa ===
Anderson was injured for the first Test against South Africa. He returned to the team for the second Test but failed to make an impact, taking 1–77 as the match ended in a draw. In the third Test Anderson took 1–60 in South Africa's first innings, before taking 1–26 in their second innings as they collapsed to 83 all out to hand England a historic victory on South Africa soil. Anderson took his best figures of the series in the final Test, finishing with 3–47 in South Africa's second innings, but a poor batting performance from England saw South Africa win the Test by 280 run, although England won the series 2–1.

=== 2016: Sri Lanka and Pakistan ===
In the first Test against Sri Lanka, Anderson was in sublime form, taking figures of 5–16 in the tourist's first innings to restrict them to 91. In their second innings, he took figures of 5–29 as England secured a comprehensive victory by a margin of an innings and 88 runs. In the second Test, Anderson took 3–36 in Sri Lanka's first innings, and followed this up with 5–58 in their second innings as England secured another win, this time by nine wickets. In the final, rain affected match of the series, Anderson took figures of 2–61 in Sri Lanka's first innings, and then took the only wicket to fall in Sri Lanka's second innings as the match ended in a draw. Following his exploits, Anderson ended the series as the World's Number One Test bowler.

After missing the first Test through injury, Anderson returned in the second match of the series and took four wickets in the match as England won to level the series at 1–1. In the third match, he took figures of 2–54 in Pakistan's first innings and then took 2–31 in their second innings as England recorded a 141 run victory. England lost the final match of the series, with Anderson taking just one wicket in the match as the series finished 2–2.

=== 2016: India ===
After missing the series against Bangladesh through injury, Anderson returned to the team for the second Test against India. He took 3–62 in the first innings as India made 455. He then took 1–33 in the second innings. India won the match by 246 runs. In the third Test he did not take a wicket in India's first innings, and with India needing a small target to win the game in the second innings, Anderson again failed to take a wicket as India won by eight wickets. In the fourth Test he took 0–63 as India posted 631 and won the game by an innings and 36 runs. Anderson missed the final Test through injury, with England losing the series 4–0.

=== 2017–18: Australia ===
Anderson was named as England Test vice-captain after Ben Stokes was suspended indefinitely. Stokes was arrested in the early hours of the morning following the third ODI against West Indies at Bristol in September 2017 from an incident near a night club, at which teammate Alex Hales was also present.

Midway through the Ashes tour England Lions batsman Ben Duckett was suspended after pouring a drink over Anderson in a Perth bar. Although coach Trevor Bayliss described the incident as trivial, coming as it did after the Stokes affair and a head-butting incident between Cameron Bancroft and Jonny Bairstow, it seemed to confirm that England had off-field issues during the 2017–18 Ashes.

Anderson played all five Test matches in the Ashes but could not prevent his team losing possession of the urn, with England slipping to a 4–0 series defeat. Despite the poor performance of the team as a whole, Anderson emerged with some considerable personal credit having returned figures of 17 wickets at an average of 27.82 over the Test series, including a haul of 5/43 in the 2nd innings of the day-night 2nd Test at Adelaide. He ended the tour as the top England wicket-taker in the Ashes. Over the entire series Anderson bowled 223.3 overs, the most in a series in his career.

=== 2018: New Zealand ===
During the second Test against New Zealand in 2018, Anderson – along with partner Stuart Broad and the two opening bowlers from the opposition (Trent Boult and Tim Southee) – was part of just the third quartet of opening bowlers to take all 20 wickets in the first innings of each team in a single Test match (and the first since 1912). In the same Test series, Anderson set another milestone by becoming the most heavily used fast bowler ever in Test history, surpassing Courtney Walsh's record of 30,019 deliveries in a Test career. He was the second highest wicket-taker in the 2 match Test series, taking 8 wickets with England eventually losing the series 1–0.

=== 2018: Pakistan and India ===
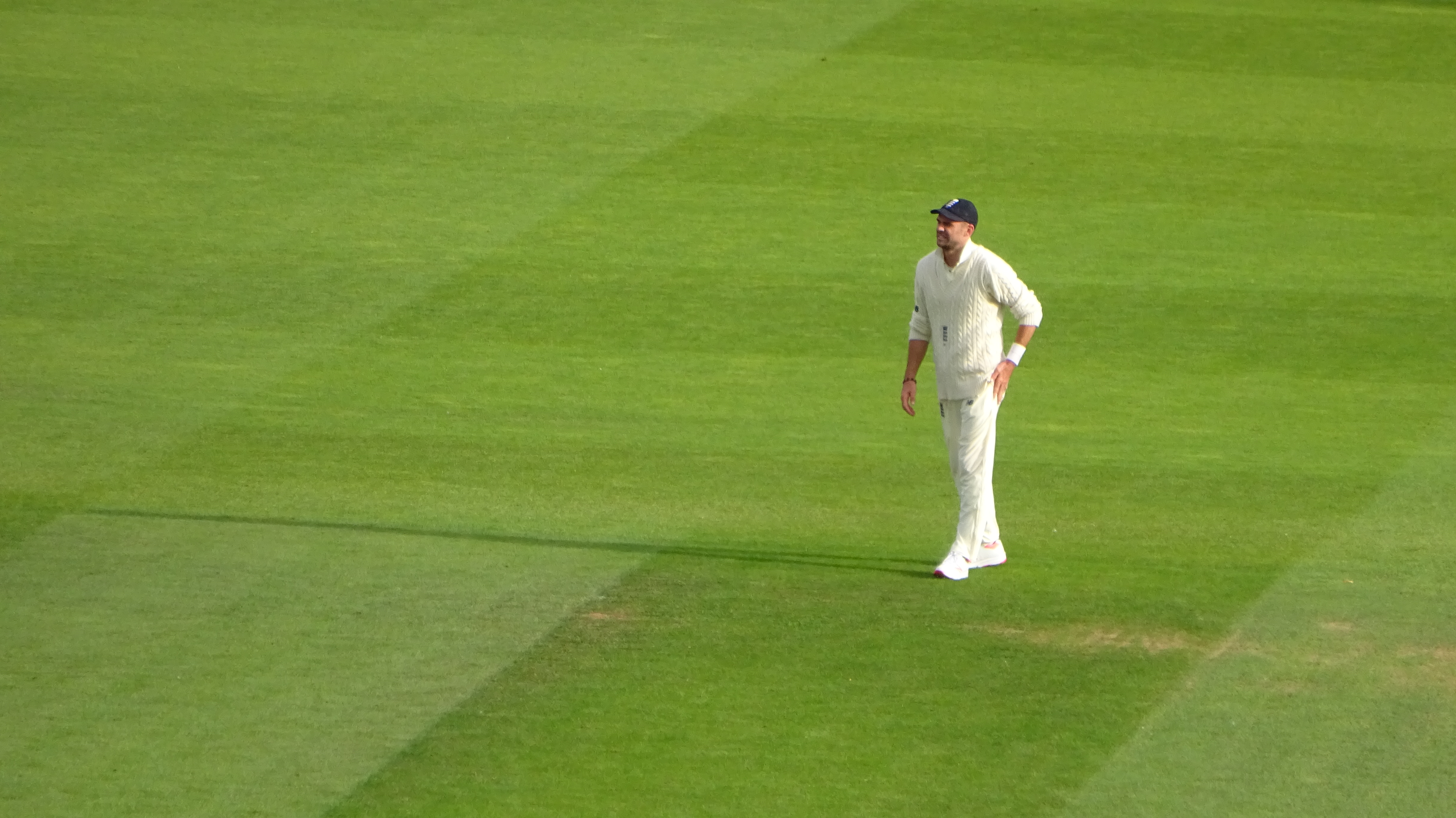
Anderson fielding against India in September 2018

Anderson was selected in the England squad to face Pakistan in May 2018 in a two Test match series. In the first Test match, which Pakistan won, Anderson had team leading match figures of 4–94. In the second Test he took 5 wickets at the expense of 78 runs, to help England win by an innings and 55 runs. Overall Anderson took a team leading 9 wickets during the series, with the series being tied 1–1.

Anderson was in the team as England played their 1,000th Test match, during the first Test against India at Edgbaston in the five-match series. During the second Test, Anderson picked up his 100th wicket at Lord's in Tests, and his 550th Test match wicket as he took 5–20 in the first innings, and finished with match figures of 9–43. The third Test at Trent Bridge was won by India as they recovered from a 2–0 start to the series, Anderson took his 100th wicket against India in Tests. In the fifth Test, Anderson equalled Glenn McGrath's record for the most Test wickets by a pace bowler (563), he then surpassed this later in the game when he took his 564th Test wicket. Anderson took 24 wickets at an average of 18.13 during the series, the most wickets by any bowler during the series as England beat India 4–1.

=== 2018–19: Sri Lanka and West Indies ===
Anderson played the first two Tests of the three-match series in Sri Lanka. In the first Test, he took match figures of 1/53 from 22 overs, helping England to their first ever Test win in Galle. The second Test saw a record breaking 38 wickets taken by spin bowlers, with Anderson going wicketless for the first time in almost two years. Anderson was rested for the third Test, to allow Stuart Broad match practice. This meant Anderson finished with just 1 wicket in the series, the lowest in a Test series he had participated in since 2003.

Anderson took a five-wicket haul during the first innings of the three-match Test series against the West Indies at Kensington Oval, Barbados. This was his 27th five-wicket haul, tying Ian Botham's record for England in Test matches. Whilst en route to his five-wicket haul, he also became the first English bowler to take 200 Test wickets away from home. Despite this, England lost the match by 381 runs, the West Indies' largest victory in terms of runs at home. Anderson finished the series, which England lost 2–1, with 10 wickets at an average of 24.50.

=== 2020: West Indies and Pakistan ===
On 29 May 2020, Anderson was named in a 55-man group of players to begin training ahead of international fixtures starting in England following the COVID-19 pandemic. On 17 June 2020, Anderson was included in England's 30-man squad to start training behind closed doors for the Test series against the West Indies. On 4 July 2020, Anderson was named in England's thirteen-man squad for the first Test match of the series. On 25 August, Anderson became the first fast bowler to reach 600 Test wickets.

In November 2020, Anderson was nominated for the ICC Men's Test Cricketer of the Decade award.

=== 2021: Australia ===
Anderson was selected for the 2021–22 Ashes. However, he encountered a relatively lean series, his only highlight being 4/33 in the second test at Adelaide as Australia won the five-Test series 4–0.

=== 2022: New Zealand, South Africa and India ===
Selected for the home series against New Zealand in May, Anderson enjoyed a relatively uneventful but consistent series, playing two out of the three Tests and being England's fourth-highest wicket-taker, all three above him having played every match, with 11 wickets at 18.63.

=== 2023: Australia ===
Anderson was selected for four of the five tests in the 2023 Ashes series. Michael Vaughan described his selection as "sentimental" and said he had "no impact at all" on the series following the fourth test. However, Nasser Hussain defended the inclusion of James Anderson in this series, pointing out that only four months earlier he had been the No. 1 bowler in the world and suggesting: "He is just out of nick. Players are not machines...He is just having a poor summer." Victory in the fifth test was Anderson's first against Australia since 2015. He finished the series with 5/427 from 154 overs. He had never previously taken as few wickets when playing at least four games in a series.

=== 2024: India, West Indies and retirement ===
During the fifth test of England's tour of India, Anderson claimed his 700th test wicket when he had Kuldeep Yadav caught behind during India's first innings in Dharamshala. He became the first fast bowler to reach this milestone, and only the third player to do so. Commenting on this achievement in The Times, former England Test captain Mike Atherton stated that "[i]t can be said with absolute certainty that no fast bowler will come close to matching Anderson’s tally. His record will stand forever."

In May 2024, Anderson announced that he would retire from international cricket following the first Test against the West Indies at Lord's in July, after it had been decided by England director of cricket Rob Key, coach Brendon McCullum, and Test captain Ben Stokes that he would not feature in the team's plans beyond the summer. Speaking on the BBC Tailenders podcast, he explained that "it was sort of just looking ahead and could a 43-year-old me make the Ashes in 18 months’ time and we sort of came to the decision that probably not", adding "it feels like the right thing for me and the team going forward. It feels like a good time". On 12 July, he bowled his last ball in international cricket, having dismissed four batters in his final game to finish his Test career with 704 wickets. Anderson accepted a mentoring role with the team for the remaining two matches against the West Indies, and subsequent Test series against Sri Lanka. He was replaced as senior bowler in the England Test team by Mark Wood and Chris Woakes.

== Achievements ==
On 25 July 2016, during the second Test of that year's England-Pakistan series at Old Trafford, Anderson became the first fast bowler to take 50 wickets against all other seven major Test-playing nations, Australia, India, New Zealand, Pakistan, South Africa, Sri Lanka and West Indies.

Anderson recorded two milestones during England's tour of South Africa in 2019–20. On 26 December 2019, in the first Test, he became only the ninth cricketer to play in 150 Test matches. On 5 January 2020, in the first innings of second Test, he took his 28th five-wicket haul in Test cricket, overtaking Ian Botham as the bowler with the most five-wicket hauls for England in Tests. With his fifth dismissal, Ben Stokes also became the first England outfielder to take five catches in an innings.

He is the only seam bowler to take 300-plus Test wickets on home soil. He is the first pace bowler, and second player overall, to take 100 Test wickets at a single venue (at Lord's; Muttiah Muralitharan has taken 100 wickets at three separate grounds in Sri Lanka) He has the most international Test deliveries bowled by a pace bowler. On 9 March 2024, Anderson became only the third player overall to reach 700 career test match wickets.

He holds the world record for "not out" batting performances in Test cricket, achieving his 62nd Test "not out" at Lord's in 2017, passing the previous record of 61 set by Courtney Walsh.

On 5 July 2021, playing for Lancashire against Kent in the County Championship, Anderson took seven wickets for 19 runs (including 5 maiden overs), a new First Class best. It also meant he passed 1,000 First Class wickets.

On 18 December 2021, during England's 1st innings in the 2nd Test of the Ashes, Anderson became the first-ever batsman to remain not out in Test cricket on 100 instances.

On 11 July 2024, James Anderson became the first-ever pacer to bowl 40,037 deliveries in Test Cricket.

He holds the record of most wickets in One-day Internationals for England (269 wickets).

== Awards ==
On 8 December 2011, Anderson was awarded the Freedom of the Borough of Burnley. In the 2015 Queen's Birthday Honours, he was appointed an Officer of the Order of the British Empire (OBE) "for services to cricket". On 11 February 2016, he received his OBE at Buckingham Palace. In April 2025, Anderson was knighted in Rishi Sunak's Resignation Honours "for services to cricket".
