= English cricket team in New Zealand in 2017–18 =

International cricket tour

| | New Zealand | England |
- Dates: 25 February – 3 April 2018
| Captains | Kane Williamson (Note: Tim Southee captained New Zealand in the 2nd ODI as Kane Williamson was injured.) | Joe Root (Tests); Eoin Morgan (ODIs) |

Test series
- Result: New Zealand won the 2-match series 1–0
| Most runs | Henry Nicholls (158) | Jonny Bairstow (163) |
| Most wickets | Trent Boult (15) | Stuart Broad (11) |
- Player of the series: Trent Boult (NZ)

One Day International series
- Results: England won the 5-match series 3–2
| Most runs | Ross Taylor (304) | Jonny Bairstow (302) |
| Most wickets | Ish Sodhi (10) | Chris Woakes (10) |
- Player of the series: Chris Woakes (Eng)

The England cricket team toured New Zealand between February and April 2018 to play two Test and five One Day International (ODI) matches. Fixtures in round 7 of New Zealand's 2016–17 Plunket Shield season were played as day/night matches, in preparation for a day/night Test match, which took place at Eden Park. In August 2017, New Zealand Cricket confirmed that the Test at Eden Park would be played as a day/night game. In September 2017, the second ODI fixture was moved from McLean Park, Napier to the Bay Oval in Mount Maunganui, after issues in re-turfing the ground.

England won the ODI series 3–2. New Zealand won the Test series 1–0, after the second match ended in a draw. It was New Zealand's first series win against England since August 1999 and their first at home since March 1984.

== Squads ==
| Tests | | ODIs | |
| New Zealand | England | New Zealand | England |
|---|---|---|---|
| Kane Williamson (c); Todd Astle; Trent Boult; Colin de Grandhomme; Martin Guptill; Matt Henry; Tom Latham; Henry Nicholls; Jeet Raval; Ish Sodhi; Tim Southee; Ross Taylor; Neil Wagner; BJ Watling (wk) | Joe Root (c); James Anderson (vc); Moeen Ali; Jonny Bairstow (wk); Stuart Broad; Alastair Cook; ~~Mason Crane~~; Ben Foakes; Jack Leach; Liam Livingstone; Dawid Malan; Craig Overton; Ben Stokes; Mark Stoneman; James Vince; Chris Woakes; Mark Wood | Kane Williamson (c); Todd Astle; Trent Boult; Mark Chapman; Lockie Ferguson; Colin de Grandhomme; Martin Guptill; Matt Henry; Tom Latham (wk); Colin Munro; Henry Nicholls; Mitchell Santner; Ish Sodhi; Tim Southee; Ross Taylor | Eoin Morgan (c); Moeen Ali; Jonny Bairstow; Sam Billings (wk); Jos Buttler (wk); Tom Curran; Alex Hales; Craig Overton; ~~Liam Plunkett~~; Adil Rashid; Joe Root; Jason Roy; Ben Stokes; David Willey; Chris Woakes; Mark Wood |

Prior to the ODI series Liam Plunkett was ruled out of England's ODI squad with Craig Overton named as his replacement. After the first ODI, Mark Chapman was added to New Zealand's squad as cover for Kane Williamson, who was suffering with a hamstring injury.

James Anderson was named as the vice-captain of England's Test squad. Mitchell Santner, who played in New Zealand's ODI matches, was not selected for the Test series after suffering a knee injury. He was ruled out of action for six to nine months, with Todd Astle selected in the squad in his absence. Before the Test series, Mason Crane was ruled out of England's squad due to stress fracture in his lower back and he was replaced by Jack Leach. Before the first Test, Martin Guptill was added to New Zealand's squad as a batting cover, while Ross Taylor recovered from injury. Todd Astle was ruled out of the second Test and was replaced by Ish Sodhi in New Zealand's squad.

== ODI series ==
=== 1st ODI ===
25 February 2018
14:00 (D/N)
Scorecard

| England; 284/8 (50 overs) | v | New Zealand; 287/7 (49.2 overs) |
| Jos Buttler 79 (65); Mitchell Santner 2/54 (10 overs) | | Ross Taylor 113 (116); Ben Stokes 2/43 (8 overs) |

New Zealand won by 3 wickets
Seddon Park, Hamilton
Umpires: Shaun Haig (NZ) and Ruchira Palliyaguruge (SL)
Player of the match: Ross Taylor (NZ)

- New Zealand won the toss and elected to field.
- Ross Taylor became the third batsman for New Zealand to score 7,000 runs in ODIs.
- Tom Latham (NZ) scored his 2,000th run in ODIs.
- Chris Woakes (Eng) took his 100th wicket in ODIs.

=== 2nd ODI ===
28 February 2018
14:00 (D/N)
Scorecard

| New Zealand; 223 (49.2 overs) | v | England; 225/4 (37.5 overs) |
| Mitchell Santner 63* (52); Moeen Ali 2/33 (10 overs) | | Ben Stokes 63* (74); Trent Boult 2/46 (8 overs) |

England won by 6 wickets
Bay Oval, Mount Maunganui
Umpires: Wayne Knights (NZ) and Rod Tucker (Aus)
Player of the match: Ben Stokes (Eng)

- England won the toss and elected to field.
- Mark Chapman made his ODI debut for New Zealand after playing for Hong Kong, becoming the tenth cricketer to play ODIs for two different teams.
- Tim Southee made his ODI captaincy debut for New Zealand.
- Mitchell Santner (NZ) played in his 50th ODI.

=== 3rd ODI ===
3 March 2018
14:00 (D/N)
Scorecard

| England; 234 (50 overs) | v | New Zealand; 230/8 (50 overs) |
| Eoin Morgan 48 (71); Ish Sodhi 3/53 (10 overs) | | Kane Williamson 112* (143); Moeen Ali 3/36 (10 overs) |

England won by 4 runs
Wellington Regional Stadium, Wellington
Umpires: Wayne Knights (NZ) and Ruchira Palliyaguruge (SL)
Player of the match: Moeen Ali (Eng)

- New Zealand won the toss and elected to field.
- Kane Williamson became the fastest New Zealand batsmen and fifth fastest overall to score 5,000 runs in ODIs.

=== 4th ODI ===
7 March 2018
11:00
Scorecard

| England; 335/9 (50 overs) | v | New Zealand; 339/5 (49.3 overs) |
| Jonny Bairstow 138 (106); Ish Sodhi 4/58 (10 overs) | | Ross Taylor 181* (147); Tom Curran 2/57 (8.3 overs) |

New Zealand won by 5 wickets
University Oval, Dunedin
Umpires: Shaun Haig (NZ) and Rod Tucker (Aus)
Player of the match: Ross Taylor (NZ)

- New Zealand won the toss and elected to field.
- Jason Roy (Eng) scored his 2,000th run in ODIs.
- Ross Taylor passed Nathan Astle to become the New Zealand's second highest run-scorer in ODIs.

=== 5th ODI ===
10 March 2018
11:00
Scorecard

| New Zealand; 223 (49.5 overs) | v | England; 229/3 (32.4 overs) |
| Mitchell Santner 67 (71); Chris Woakes 3/32 (10 overs) | | Jonny Bairstow 104 (60); Mitchell Santner 1/44 (10 overs) |

England won by 7 wickets
Hagley Oval, Christchurch
Umpires: Wayne Knights (NZ) and Ruchira Palliyaguruge (SL)
Player of the match: Jonny Bairstow (Eng)

- England won the toss and elected to field.
- Eoin Morgan (Eng) played in his 200th ODI.
- Alex Hales (Eng) scored his 2,000th run in ODIs.

== Tour matches ==
=== Two-day match: New Zealand XI vs England ===
14–15 March 2018 (D/N)
Scorecard

| New Zealand XI | v | England |
| 376 (90 overs); Tom Blundell 131 (194); James Anderson 4/56 (16 overs) | | 319/14 (90 overs); Liam Livingstone 88 (113); Scott Kuggeleijn 4/50 (15 overs) |

Match drawn
Seddon Park, Hamilton
Umpires: Shaun Haig (NZ) and Wayne Knights (NZ)

- New Zealand XI won the toss and elected to bat.
- 13 players per side (11 batting, 11 fielding).
- Each side batted for a whole day, with some players batting twice.

=== Two-day match: New Zealand XI vs England ===
16–17 March 2018
Scorecard

| New Zealand XI | v | England |
| 287/13 (90 overs); Martin Guptill 73 (137); Moeen Ali 3/67 (21 overs) | | 353/9 (90 overs); Joe Root 115 (150); Scott Kuggeleijn 3/67 (14 overs) |

Match drawn
Seddon Park, Hamilton
Umpires: Shaun Haig (NZ) and Wayne Knights (NZ)

- New Zealand XI won the toss and elected to bat.
- 13 players per side (11 batting, 11 fielding).
- Each side batted for a whole day, with some players batting twice.

== Test series ==
=== 1st Test ===
22–26 March 2018 (D/N)
Scorecard

| England | v | New Zealand |
| 58 (20.4 overs); Craig Overton 33* (25); Trent Boult 6/32 (10.4 overs) | | 427/8d (141 overs); Henry Nicholls 145* (268); Stuart Broad 3/78 (34 overs) |
| 320 (126.1 overs); Ben Stokes 66 (188); Todd Astle 3/39 (16.1 overs) |

New Zealand won by an innings and 49 runs
Eden Park, Auckland
Umpires: Bruce Oxenford (Aus) and Paul Reiffel (Aus)
Player of the match: Trent Boult (NZ)

- New Zealand won the toss and elected to field.
- Only 23.1 and 2.5 overs were bowled on day 2 and day 3 respectively due to rain.
- This was the first day-night Test played in New Zealand.
- Moeen Ali (Eng) played his 50th Test.
- Trent Boult and Tim Southee were the only two bowlers required to dismiss England in their first innings, the first instance of this happened for New Zealand. Boult also recorded his best bowling figures in Test matches.
- England's first innings score was their lowest against New Zealand and their sixth lowest overall.
- Stuart Broad (Eng) took his 400th wicket in Tests and became the youngest fast bowler to take 400 Test wickets.
- Kane Williamson scored his 18th Test century, setting a new record for most centuries by a New Zealand batsman in Tests.

=== 2nd Test ===
30 March–3 April 2018
Scorecard

| England | v | New Zealand |
| 307 (96.5 overs); Jonny Bairstow 101 (170); Tim Southee 6/62 (26 overs) | | 278 (93.3 overs); BJ Watling 85 (220); Stuart Broad 6/54 (22.3 overs) |
| 352/9d (106.4 overs); James Vince 76 (128); Colin de Grandhomme 4/94 (26 overs) | | 256/8 (124.4 overs); Tom Latham 83 (207); Mark Wood 2/45 (22 overs) |

Match drawn
Hagley Oval, Christchurch
Umpires: Marais Erasmus (SA) and Bruce Oxenford (Aus)
Player of the match: Tim Southee (NZ)

- New Zealand won the toss and elected to field.
- Jack Leach (Eng) made his Test debut.
- For only the third time in Tests, the opening bowlers for each team (Trent Boult and Tim Southee for New Zealand, and James Anderson and Stuart Broad for England) took the first 20 wickets in the match.
- James Anderson (Eng) bowled his 30,020th delivery during New Zealand's second innings, the most by a fast bowler in Tests.
