= Dilan Raj =

Sri Lankan cricket player and coach (born 1972)

Personal information
- Born: 12 December 1972 (age 53); Colombo, Sri Lanka
- Batting: Right-handed
- Bowling: Right-arm leg break

Domestic team information
- Years: Team
- 1997/98: Matabeleland

Career statistics
| Competition | FC | LA |
|---|---|---|
| Matches | 2 | 1 |
| Runs scored | 50 | 16 |
| Batting average | 12.50 | 16.00 |
| 100s/50s | 0/0 | 0/0 |
| Top score | 21 | 16 |
| Balls bowled | 4 | – |
| Wickets | 0 | – |
| Bowling average | – | – |
| 5 wickets in innings | – | – |
| 10 wickets in match | – | – |
| Best bowling | – | – |
| Catches/stumpings | 0/– | 0/– |
- Source: ESPNcricinfo, 20 July 2021

Dilan Raj (born 12 December 1972) is a Sri Lankan cricket coach and former player. He was a right-handed batsman and a right-arm leg break bowler. Born in Colombo, Raj represented the Zimbabwean region of Matabeleland in two first-class matches during the 1997–98 Logan Cup.

In 2000, Raj moved to New Zealand, where he established himself as a cricket coach. He worked for Cricket Wanganui successfully turning around the Association's finances as well as creating new cricket opportunities, before becoming director of cricket of Palmerston North-based Manawatū Cricket Association in 2019.
