= Murray Brown (cricketer) =

New Zealand cricketer (born 1946)

Personal information
- Born: 9 November 1946 (age 80); Inglewood, New Zealand
- Source: Cricinfo, 29 October 2020

Murray Brown (born 9 November 1946) is a New Zealand cricketer. He played in five first-class matches for Central Districts from 1973 to 1975.

With fellow Central Districts and Manawatū player Alec Astle, Brown wrote 125 Not Out, the official history of the Manawatū Cricket Association, in 2021. In 2026, he and Astle wrote and published The Challenges, a history of the Hawke Cup.
