= Manawatu cricket team =

New Zealand cricket team

Manawatū cricket team
Personnel
- Coach: Dilan Raj (Director of cricket)
- Owner: Manawatū Cricket Association

Team information
- Founded: 1895
- Home ground: Fitzherbert Park, Palmerston North

History
- Hawke Cup wins: 9
- Official website: http://www.mca.org.nz

The Manawatu cricket team represents the Manawatū district of New Zealand. It is one of the 21 teams from around New Zealand that compete in the Hawke Cup.

== History ==
Cricket was played in the region in the 1870s. The Palmerston Cricket Club was formed in October 1878. The Manawatu Cricket Association was formed in 1895, made up of six clubs: Feilding, Palmerston North, Colyton, Carnarvon, Cheltenham and Birmingham.

Manawatu played in the very first match in the Hawke Cup, when they defeated Wairarapa in December 1910, thanks largely to the bowling of Arthur Ongley, who took 12 wickets. They have held the Hawke Cup nine times, the first time from February 1928 to March 1930, and most recently from February 2014 to February 2015. They also held the trophy between December 1934 and February 1938, and between January 1940 and April 1947.

Manawatu is one of the eight district associations that make up Central Districts, which competes in the first-class Plunket Shield, the 50-over Ford Trophy and the T20 Super Smash. When Central Districts played their first first-class match in December 1950, they were captained by Manawatu's Joe Ongley.

In 2021, to mark the 125th anniversary of the Manawatu Cricket Association, two former Central Districts and Manawatū players, Murray Brown and Alec Astle, wrote 125 Not Out, the Association's official history.

== Senior teams ==
As of the 2025–26 season, the clubs that compete at senior level in the Manawatu Cricket Association are: Bloomfield, Dannevirke SC, Feilding, Freyberg, Manawatu-Foxton, Marist, Maw Haws, Old Boys, Palmerston, Palmy Stallions, Palmy Titans, United, Wanderers.
