= List of international cricket five-wicket hauls by James Anderson =

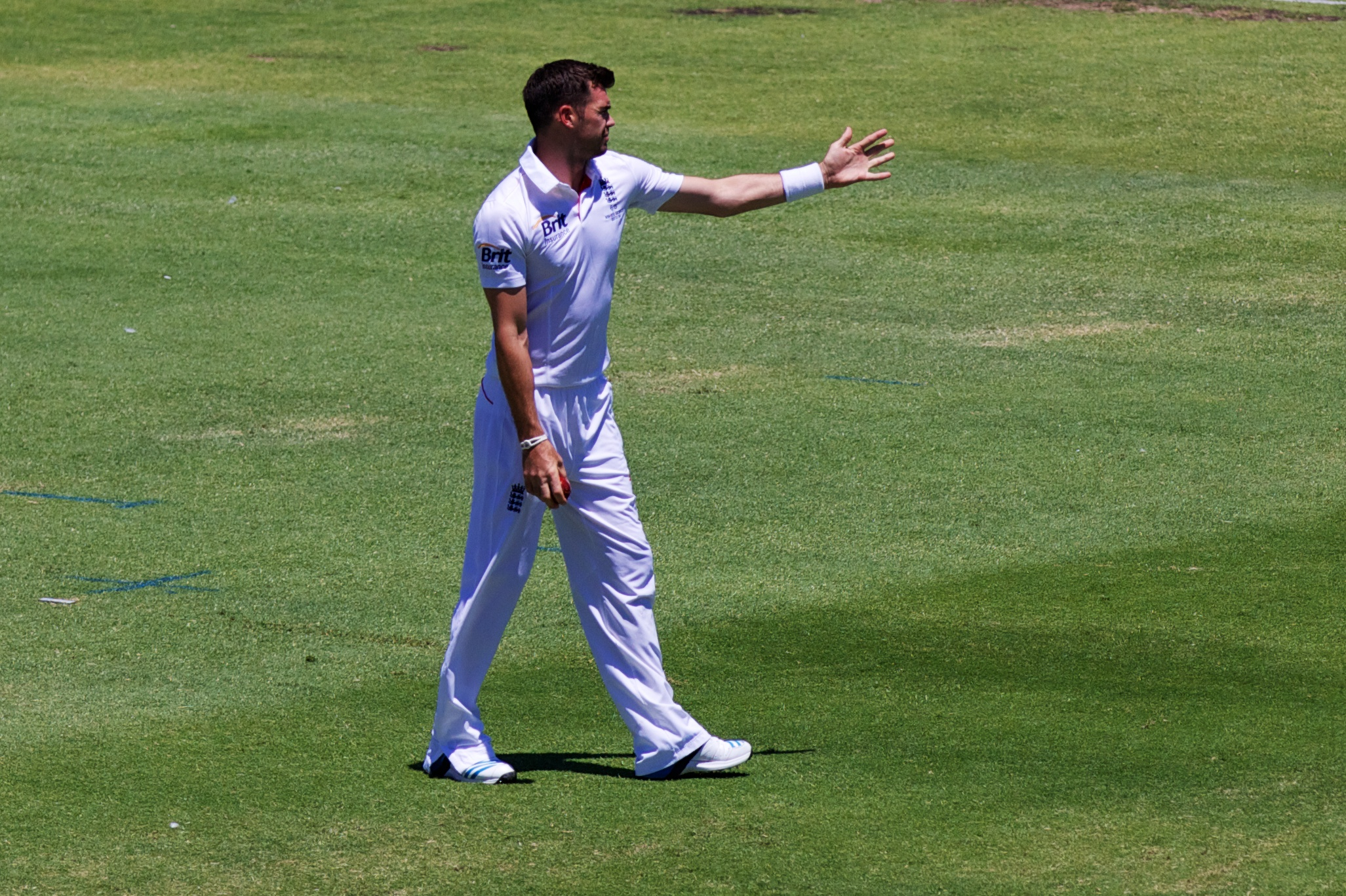
English fast bowler, James Anderson, took 32 five-wicket hauls in Test cricket and 2 five-wicket hauls in ODIs.

In cricket, a five-wicket haul (also known as a "five–for" or "fifer") refers to a bowler taking five or more wickets in a single innings. This is regarded as a notable achievement; and as of October 2024, only 54 bowlers have taken 15 or more five-wicket hauls at international level in their cricketing careers. James Anderson, an English cricketer has taken 34 five-wicket hauls in international cricket. A right-arm fast-medium bowler, Anderson played 188 Tests and 194 One Day International (ODI) matches for his country, and took 704 and 269 wickets respectively. He was honoured with the NBC Denis Compton Award for "The Most Promising Young Player" in 2002, and the Wisden Cricketers' Almanack named him one of their cricketers of the year in 2009. In 2013, former Pakistan captain, Wasim Akram described him as "the best bowler of this era".

Anderson took a five-wicket haul on his Test debut in 2003 against Zimbabwe at Lord's Cricket Ground. He took 5 wickets for 73 runs in the match which England won by an innings and 92 runs. In July 2010, he took five-wicket hauls in both innings of a Test match against Pakistan at the Trent Bridge. In total, he took 11 wickets for 71 runs, which remains his best bowling figures in a Test match as of August 2020. He took another pair of five-wicket hauls at the same venue, against Australia in the first Test of the 2013 Ashes series. Anderson's career-best figures for an innings are 7 wickets for 42 runs against West Indies at Lord's Cricket Ground, in September 2017. As of 2022, he has taken 32 Test five-wicket hauls at 11 cricket grounds, and has been most successful against India with six five-wicket hauls against them.

Anderson made his ODI debut against Australia at the Melbourne Cricket Ground during the 2002–03 VB series; England lost the match by 89 runs. His first ODI five-wicket haul came in November 2009 against South Africa at the St George's Oval. His career best performance of 5 wickets for 23 runs in the match earned him the man of the match award. Anderson has taken two five-wicket hauls in ODI cricket.

Making his first Twenty20 International (T20I) appearance in 2007, Anderson has yet to take a five-wicket haul in the format As of 2017. His best performance in T20I is 3 wickets for 23 runs, against the Netherlands at Lord's Cricket Ground during the 2009 ICC World Twenty20.

As of 2024, he is ninth among all-time five-wicket haul takers, and first in the equivalent list for England.

== Key ==
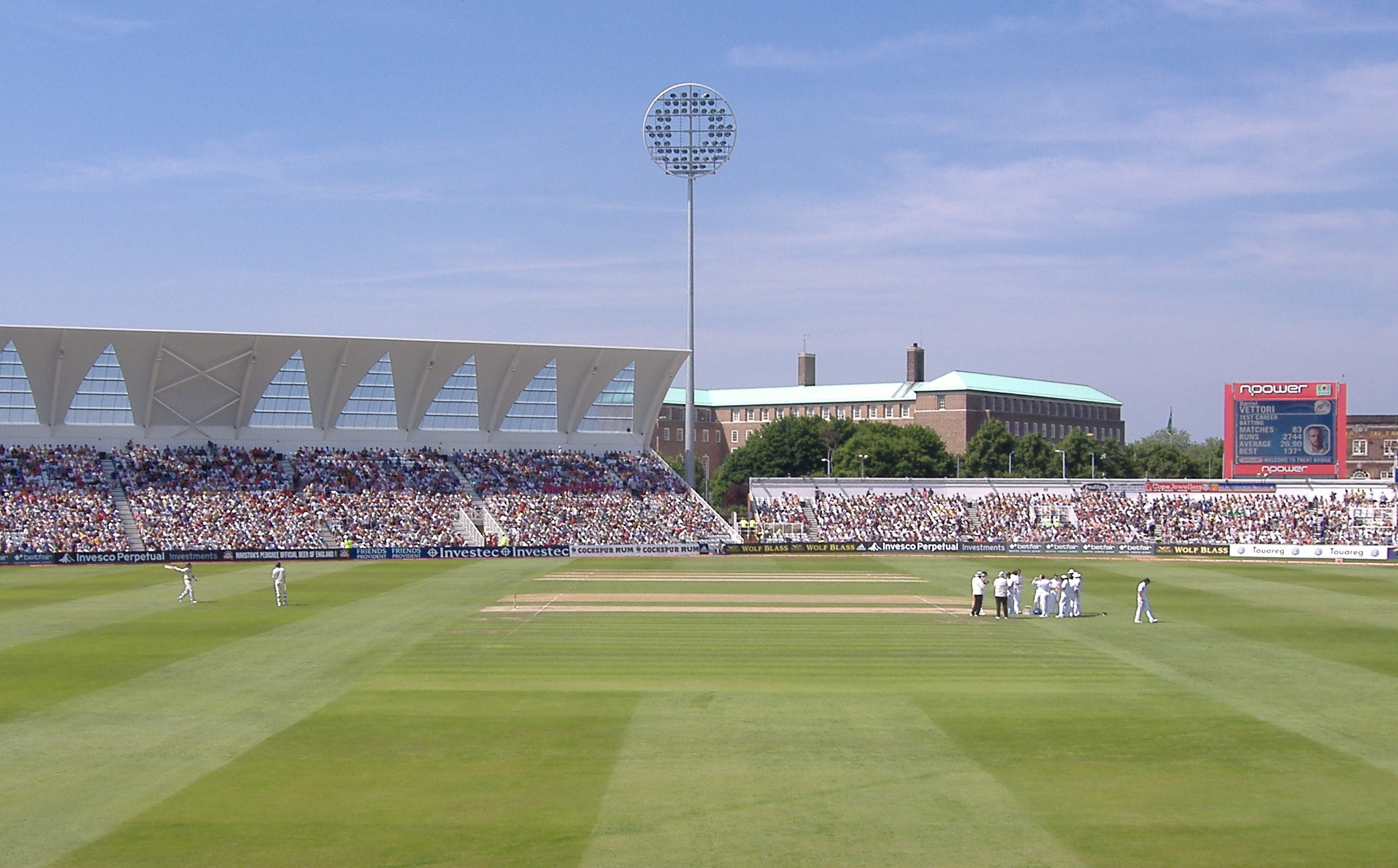
Trent Bridge, Nottingham, where Anderson took six of his twenty-one Test five-wicket hauls, the most by any player at the ground.

Symbol	Meaning
Date	Day the Test started or ODI held
Inn	The innings of the match in which the five-wicket haul was taken
Overs	Number of overs bowled in that innings
Runs	Number of runs conceded
Wkts	Number of wickets taken
Batsmen	The batsmen whose wickets were taken in the five-wicket haul
Econ	Bowling economy rate (average runs per over)
Result	Result for the England team
*	One of two five-wicket hauls by Anderson in a match
†	10 wickets or more taken in the match
‡	Anderson was selected as man of the match

== Tests ==
Five-wicket hauls in Test cricket by James Anderson
No.	Date	Ground	Against	Inn	Overs	Runs	Wkts	Econ	Batsmen	Result
1	22 May 2003	Lord's Cricket Ground, London	Zimbabwe	2	16	73	5	4.56	Mark Vermeulen; Heath Streak; Andy Blignaut; Travis Friend; Douglas Hondo	Won
2	14 August 2003	Trent Bridge, Nottingham	South Africa	2	27.5	102	5	3.66	Jacques Kallis; Neil McKenzie; Shaun Pollock; Andrew Hall; Paul Adams	Won
3	19 July 2007	Lord's Cricket Ground, London	India	2	24.2	42	5	1.72	Rahul Dravid; Sachin Tendulkar; Sourav Ganguly; MS Dhoni; Anil Kumble	Drawn
4	13 March 2008	Basin Reserve, Wellington	New Zealand	2	20	73	5	3.65	Jamie How; Matthew Bell; Stephen Fleming; Mathew Sinclair; Ross Taylor	Won
5	5 June 2008 ‡	Trent Bridge, Nottingham	New Zealand	2	21.3	43	7	2.00	Jamie How; Aaron Redmond; Brendon McCullum; Ross Taylor; Daniel Flynn; Gareth Hopkins; Jacob Oram	Won
6	14 May 2009 ‡	Riverside Ground, Chester-le-Street	West Indies	2	26.3	87	5	3.28	Devon Smith; Chris Gayle; Ramnaresh Sarwan; Lendl Simmons; Brendan Nash	Won
7	30 July 2009	Edgbaston, Birmingham	Australia	1	24	80	5	3.33	Michael Clarke; Marcus North; Graham Manou; Mitchell Johnson; Peter Siddle	Drawn
8	3 January 2010	Newlands Cricket Ground, Cape Town	South Africa	1	21.2	63	5	2.97	Graeme Smith; Ashwell Prince; Dale Steyn; Morne Morkel; Friedel de Wet	Drawn
9	29 July 2010 * † ‡	Trent Bridge, Nottingham	Pakistan	2	22	54	5	2.45	Imran Farhat; Salman Butt; Azhar Ali; Shoaib Malik; Mohammad Amir	Won
10	29 July 2010 * † ‡	Trent Bridge, Nottingham	Pakistan	4	15	17	6	1.13	Imran Farhat; Umar Amin; Umar Akmal; Shoaib Malik; Umar Gul; Mohammad Asif	Won
11	21 July 2011	Lord's Cricket Ground, London	India	4	28	65	5	2.32	Rahul Dravid; VVS Laxman; Sachin Tendulkar; Suresh Raina; Harbhajan Singh	Won
12	26 March 2012	Galle International Stadium, Galle	Sri Lanka	1	20.3	72	5	3.51	Lahiru Thirimanne; Kumar Sangakkara; Mahela Jayawardene; Prasanna Jayawardene; Chanaka Welegedara	Lost
13	16 May 2013	Lord's Cricket Ground, London	New Zealand	2	24	47	5	1.95	Peter Fulton; Hamish Rutherford; Kane Williamson; Ross Taylor; Bruce Martin	Won
14	10 July 2013 * † ‡	Trent Bridge, Nottingham	Australia	2	24	85	5	3.54	Chris Rogers; Michael Clarke; Steve Smith; Peter Siddle; Mitchell Starc	Won
15	10 July 2013 * † ‡	Trent Bridge, Nottingham	Australia	4	31.5	73	5	2.29	Chris Rogers; Brad Haddin; Ashton Agar; Mitchell Starc; Peter Siddle	Won
16	27 July 2014 ‡	Rose Bowl, Southampton	India	2	26.1	53	5	2.02	Shikhar Dhawan; Virat Kohli; Ravindra Jadeja; MS Dhoni; Mohammed Shami	Won
17	1 May 2015	Kensington Oval, Bridgetown	West Indies	2	12.4	42	6	2.02	Kraigg Brathwaite; Shai Hope; Marlon Samuels; Veerasammy Permaul; Jerome Taylor; Jermaine Blackwood	Lost
18	29 July 2015	Edgbaston, Birmingham	Australia	1	14.4	47	6	3.20	David Warner; Adam Voges; Mitchell Marsh; Peter Nevill; Mitchell Johnson; Nathan Lyon	Won
19	19 May 2016 * †	Headingley, Leeds	Sri Lanka	2	11.4	16	5	1.37	Kaushal Silva; Angelo Mathews; Dasun Shanaka; Rangana Herath; Shaminda Eranga	Won
20	19 May 2016 * †	Headingley, Leeds	Sri Lanka	3	13.3	29	5	2.15	Dimuth Karunaratne; Kaushal Silva; Kusal Mendis; Dasun Shanaka; Nuwan Pradeep	Won
21	27 May 2016 ‡	Riverside Ground, Chester-le-Street	Sri Lanka	3	27	58	5	2.14	Kusal Mendis; Angelo Mathews; Milinda Siriwardana; Rangana Herath; Shaminda Eranga	Won
22	14 July 2017	Trent Bridge, Nottingham	South Africa	1	23.2	72	5	3.08	Dean Elgar; Vernon Philander; Keshav Maharaj; Chris Morris; Morne Morkel	Lost
23	25 August 2017	Headingley, Leeds	West Indies	2	29	76	5	2.62	Kieran Powell; Devendra Bishoo; Kyle Hope; Shai Hope; Shane Dowrich	Lost
24	7 September 2017	Lord's Cricket Ground, London	West Indies	3	20.1	42	7	2.08	Kraigg Brathwaite; Kieran Powell; Roston Chase; Jermaine Blackwood; Shai Hope; Devendra Bishoo; Kemar Roach	Won
25	2 December 2017	Adelaide Oval, Adelaide	Australia	3	22	43	5	1.95	Cameron Bancroft; Usman Khawaja; Nathan Lyon; Peter Handscomb; Mitchell Starc	Lost
26	9 August 2018	Lord's Cricket Ground, London	India	1	13.2	20	5	1.50	Murali Vijay; KL Rahul; Ajinkya Rahane; Kuldeep Yadav; Ishant Sharma	Won
27	23 January 2019	Kensington Oval, Bridgetown	West Indies	1	30	46	5	1.53	Shai Hope; Roston Chase; Shane Dowrich; Jason Holder; Alzarri Joseph	Lost
28	3 January 2020	Newlands Cricket Ground, Cape Town	South Africa	2	19	40	5	2.10	Faf du Plessis; Dwaine Pretorius; Keshav Maharaj; Kagiso Rabada; Anrich Nortje	Won
29	21 August 2020	Rose Bowl, Southampton	Pakistan	2	23	56	5	2.43	Shan Masood; Abid Ali; Babar Azam; Asad Shafiq; Naseem Shah	Drawn
30	22 January 2021	Galle International Stadium, Galle	Sri Lanka	1	29	40	6	1.38	Kusal Perera; Oshada Fernando; Lahiru Thirimanne; Angelo Mathews; Niroshan Dickwella; Suranga Lakmal	Won
31	12 August 2021	Lord's Cricket Ground, London	India	1	29	62	5	1.50	Rohit Sharma; Cheteshwar Pujara; Ajinkya Rahane; Ishant Sharma; Jasprit Bumrah	Lost
32	1 July 2022	Edgbaston, Birmingham	India	1	21.5	60	5	2.74	Shubman Gill; Cheteshwar Pujara; Shreyas Iyer; Ravindra Jadeja; Mohammed Siraj	Won

== One Day Internationals ==
Five-wicket hauls in ODI cricket by James Anderson
No.	Date	Ground	Against	Inn	Overs	Runs	Wkts	Econ	Batsmen	Result
1	29 November 2009 ‡	St George's Oval, Port Elizabeth	South Africa	1	10	23	5	2.30	Hashim Amla; JP Duminy; Mark Boucher; Ryan McLaren; Johan Botha	Won
2	20 February 2013	McLean Park, Napier	New Zealand	1	9.5	34	5	3.45	BJ Watling; Hamish Rutherford; Ross Taylor; Nathan McCullum; Trent Boult	Won
