= Joe Ongley =

New Zealand cricketer (1918–2000)

The Honourable Sir Joseph Ongley
- Ongley in 1967

Personal information
- Full name: Joseph Augustine Ongley
- Born: 5 February 1918; Feilding, New Zealand
- Died: 22 October 2000 (aged 82); Wellington, New Zealand
- Batting: Right-handed
- Relatives: Arthur Ongley (father); Mont Ongley (uncle)

Domestic team information
- Years: Team
- 1938/39–1949/50: Wellington
- 1950/51–1951/52: Central Districts

Career statistics
Competition	First-class
Matches	30
Runs scored	1,234
Batting average	22.43
100s/50s	1/6
Top score	110
Catches/stumpings	13/–
- Source: Cricinfo, 16 September 2015

Sir Joseph Augustine Ongley (5 February 1918 – 22 October 2000) was a New Zealand cricketer and lawyer. He was a judge of the High Court.

== Early life ==
The son of Arthur "Joe" Ongley, he was born in Feilding and educated at St. Patrick's College, Silverstream, and Victoria College, Wellington, where he graduated Bachelor of Laws in 1939. A "correct, polished and dashing" batsman, he made his Hawke Cup debut for Manawatu at the age of 17 in 1935–36. Still only 18 when he was appointed, he captained the team in its six matches in 1936–37 and 1937–38, when Manawatu, the champions, withstood five consecutive challenges.

== First-class cricket career ==
Ongley made his first-class debut in 1938–39 for Wellington in the Plunket Shield, scoring a century in his first match against Otago. Batting first, at one stage Wellington were 116 for 5, but Ongley made 110, reaching his century in 149 minutes, and Wellington went on to win by an innings. He was selected to play for New Zealand later that season against Sir Julien Cahn's XI and made 35 as an opening batsman in a match ruined by rain.

He married Joan Archer in 1943. They had four sons and a daughter.

Ongley continued to play for Wellington, with moderate success, through the late 1940s, and captained the team from 1947–48 to 1949–50. He also continued to captain Manawatu in the Hawke Cup, including a period as title holders in the mid-1940s.

When the Central Districts team made its first appearance in the 1950–51 Plunket Shield, he was chosen to be captain. Central Districts finished second in 1950–51 and third in 1951–52, after which Ongley retired from first-class cricket. He continued to captain Manawatu until 1956–57, and played his last Hawke Cup match in 1957–58.

== Later life and death ==
Ongley became the first-ever chairman of Central Districts Cricket Association, a position he held from 1954 to 1969. He managed the New Zealand cricket team in Australia in 1967–68.

Ongley succeeded his father as Crown Solicitor at Palmerston North in 1960. He was appointed as a judge of the High Court of New Zealand in 1975, and served until 1986. In 1977, he was awarded the Queen Elizabeth II Silver Jubilee Medal, and he was appointed a Knight Bachelor in the 1987 Queen's Birthday Honours. In 1990, he received the New Zealand 1990 Commemoration Medal.

Ongley died in Wellington on 22 October 2000, at the age of 82.
