= Alec Astle =

New Zealand cricketer

Personal information
- Full name: Alec Morrison Astle
- Born: 5 August 1949 (age 77); Feilding, New Zealand
- Batting: Right-handed
- Bowling: Right arm medium-fast
- Relatives: Todd Astle (son)

Domestic team information
- Years: Team
- 1973/74–1978/79: Central Districts

Career statistics
Competition	First-class	List A
Matches	2	1
Runs scored	4	0
Batting average	–	0
100s/50s	0/0	0/0
Top score	4*	0
Balls bowled	120	56
Wickets	0	1
Bowling average	–	16
5 wickets in innings	–	0
10 wickets in match	–	0
Best bowling	–	1/16
Catches/stumpings	1/–	0/–
- Source: Cricinfo, 16 February 2010

Alec Morrison Astle (born 5 August 1949) is a former New Zealand cricketer, schoolteacher, cricket administrator and author.

== Life and career ==
Astle was born in Feilding. He is the father of Todd Astle. He played two first-class matches for the Central Districts in the 1978–79 season. He also played for Manawatu in the Hawke Cup.

Astle was a long-serving and influential staff member, cricket coach and Deputy Rector of Palmerston North Boys' High School, where he taught for 24 years. After that, he served as national development manager for New Zealand Cricket in Christchurch for more than 10 years. He then worked for Spark as a community sport manager. While in Christchurch he served as President of the Christchurch Metro Cricket Association, and in recognition of his service he received a Lifetime Service Award at the 2019 Sport Canterbury Awards.

He was awarded a master's degree in 1975 and a PhD from Massey University in 2015, writing his doctoral thesis on the importance of the grassroots level of cricket. He is the co-author of Sport Development in Action: Plan, Programme and Practice (2018), a textbook on the development of sport in communities and schools. With fellow Central Districts and Manawatū player Murray Brown, Astle wrote 125 Not Out, the official history of the Manawatū Cricket Association, in 2021. In 2026, Astle and Brown wrote and published The Challenges, a history of the Hawke Cup.
