= Todd Astle =

New Zealand cricketer

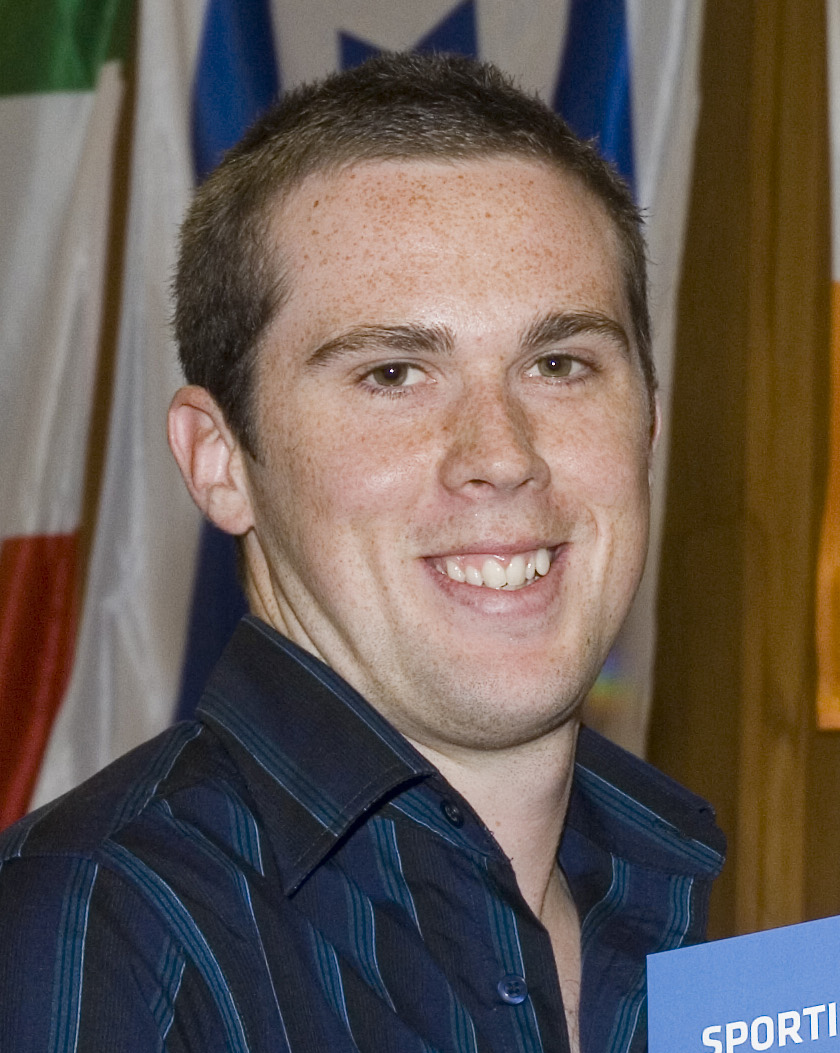
- Astle in 2010

Personal information
- Full name: Todd Duncan Astle
- Born: 24 September 1986 (age 40); Palmerston North, New Zealand
- Batting: Right-handed
- Bowling: Right-arm leg spin
- Role: Bowling all-rounder
- Relatives: Alec Astle (father)

International information
- National side: New Zealand (2012–2021)
- Test debut (cap 257): 25 November 2012 v Sri Lanka
- Last Test: 3 January 2020 v Australia
- ODI debut (cap 193): 20 December 2017 v West Indies
- Last ODI: 16 February 2019 v Bangladesh
- ODI shirt no.: 60
- T20I debut (cap 68): 15 January 2016 v Pakistan
- Last T20I: 17 November 2021 v India
- T20I shirt no.: 60

Career statistics
| Competition | Test | ODI | T20I | FC |
|---|---|---|---|---|
| Matches | 5 | 9 | 5 | 119 |
| Runs scored | 98 | 79 | 4 | 4,345 |
| Batting average | 19.60 | 26.33 | 2.00 | 25.86 |
| 100s/50s | 0/0 | 0/0 | 0/0 | 2/22 |
| Top score | 35 | 49 | 3 | 195 |
| Balls bowled | 667 | 270 | 78 | 19,005 |
| Wickets | 7 | 10 | 7 | 334 |
| Bowling average | 52.57 | 24.60 | 16.57 | 32.17 |
| 5 wickets in innings | 0 | 0 | 0 | 13 |
| 10 wickets in match | 0 | 0 | 0 | 2 |
| Best bowling | 3/39 | 3/33 | 4/13 | 8/148 |
| Catches/stumpings | 3/– | 2/– | 3/– | 89/– |
Medal record
Men's Cricket
Representing New Zealand
ICC T20 World Cup
| Runner-up | 2021 UAE & Oman |
- Source: ESPNcricinfo, 17 November 2021

Todd Duncan Astle (born 24 September 1986) is a former New Zealand cricketer who played for the New Zealand national cricket team. Astle began his cricket career as an opening batsman, representing New Zealand in the 2006 Under-19 Cricket World Cup, but over time playing first-class cricket for Canterbury, he morphed into a bowling all-rounder. He made his Test cricket debut for New Zealand in 2012 in Sri Lanka, but did not play another international match until 2015. He represented New Zealand in all three forms of the game, but was unable to keep a consistent place in the team in any format because of regular injury problems and competition with other spin bowlers. In January 2020, Astle retired from first-class cricket to focus on limited-overs cricket. In February 2023 he retired from all forms of professional cricket.

== Early life and career ==
Astle was born in Palmerston North in New Zealand in 1986, the son of first-class cricketer Alec Astle, who played three top-level cricket matches for Central Districts in the 1970s. Astle began his cricket career as an opening batsman, but over time morphed into an all-rounder with his leg spin bowling.

Astle opened the batting for the New Zealand under-19s in the 2006 Under-19 Cricket World Cup and did not bowl a ball. He finished the cup as the third-highest run-scorer, only behind future Test cricketers Cheteshwar Pujara from India and Eoin Morgan from Ireland. Astle made his debut for state team Canterbury in the first-class Plunket Shield in December 2005, and for the next four years played primarily as an opening batsman.

Astle was an overseas professional for Aberdeenshire C.C. for the 2008 and 2009 seasons, starring with bat and ball. The club had a historic season in 2009, winning the SNCL Premier League and the Scottish Cup.

Astle failed to make his mark for Canterbury as a batsman and wasn't able to stay in the team consistently. The turning point of his career came in March 2010. He wasn't even selected to play for Canterbury in a Plunket Shield match against Otago, but when Canterbury fast bowler Chris Martin was called up to the national team he had to leave the match after two days and Astle was brought into the team to replace him. In the final innings, Astle took his first five-wicket haul in a first-class match to help Canterbury win the match by 158 runs. In the following 2010–11 season, Astle took 37 wickets at an average of 29.08, both becoming Canterbury's best bowler and winning the championship. He followed this up with another strong season in 2011–12, taking a further 31 wickets.

In October 2019, during the Plunket Shield match against Wellington, Astle became the first bowler for Canterbury to take 300 first-class wickets. In June 2020, he was offered a contract by Canterbury ahead of the 2020–21 domestic cricket season.

== International career ==
=== Test debut ===
Astle was first included in the New Zealand national cricket team's squad in 2012 when he was named as New Zealand's second spinner for their tour of Sri Lanka in 2012. He made his Test debut for the Blackcaps against Sri Lanka on 25 November 2012. He scored 35 runs in the second innings in a key partnership with Ross Taylor of 107. He took his first wicket also in the second innings by removing Prasanna Jayawardene. Rather than this debut being the start of a long career for Astle, he didn't play another Test for years and was just one of a number of spinners to go through the New Zealand Test team during an injury to Daniel Vettori.

=== Return to international cricket ===
For the next three years, Astle did not return to New Zealand's national team in any form of the game. In 2015 he was selected to play for New Zealand A, and in a first-class match against Sri Lanka A took just the second ten-wicket haul of his first-class career. He took four wickets in the first innings and seven wickets in the second innings to finish with eleven for the match. This performance and a successful 2015–16 Ford Trophy put him back into the selection frame for the national team, and in January 2016 he was named in New Zealand's squad for a series of Twenty20 Internationals against Pakistan. He made his Twenty20 International debut on 15 January 2016, and played in the first two matches of the three-match series. He didn't take any wickets and conceded 41 runs from 4 overs across the two matches, so ahead of the final match he was released from the national squad and returned to playing for Canterbury.

Astle became one of the best players in New Zealand's domestic cricket competitions, both in limited overs cricket and in the Plunket Shield, which gave him opportunities to play more international cricket matches for New Zealand. He returned to the national squad in the 2016–17 summer to replace the injured Mitchell Santner. He was the only specialist spin bowler named to play in a two-Test series against Pakistan. His selection received praise from Pakistan's coach, Mickey Arthur, who said that Astle was an "interesting choice" and an "attacking spinner". Astle played in the first Test of the series, the second of his career, but didn't score any runs and only bowled four overs. He was then included in New Zealand's squad for the 2016–17 Chappell-Hadlee Trophy, but he did not play a game in the series.

=== 2017–2019, Injury woes ===
Astle was part of a New Zealand A squad for a tour of India in 2017, and he was the team's best bowler. In a one-day match against India A, he took bowling figures of 4/22, which former Indian Test batsman Rahul Dravid called one of the best leg spin spells he'd seen in Indian conditions. In October 2017, Astle was named in New Zealand's One Day International (ODI) squad for their series against India, giving him a chance to make his ODI debut, but during a warm-up match against the Indian Presidents XI he tore his groin just three deliveries into his bowling spell. He was ruled out due to his injury and pulled from the squad.

Astle returned home, and once fit again he played his 100th first-class match for Canterbury and was able to re-join the New Zealand ODI squad against the West Indies. He finally made his ODI debut for New Zealand on 20 December 2017. His first ODI series was a successful one: on debut he took 3 wickets for 33, using his wrong 'un well and rarely bowling a poor ball, then in the 2nd ODI he scored 49 runs as part of a 130-run partnership with Henry Nicholls, New Zealand's highest ever sixth-wicket partnership against the West Indies. In March 2018, he was named in New Zealand's Test squad for their series against England, replacing Mitchell Santner, who was ruled out due to injury, and in a day-night Test match in Auckland he took three wickets in the second innings, leading New Zealand to victory. Unfortunately he also suffered a side strain during the match, denying him the chance to play in the next Test match at his home ground Hagley Oval. Regardless, his form in both ODIs and Test matches was enough to give him a contract for the 2018–19 season with New Zealand Cricket, his first central contract after 12 years of first-class cricket.

Astle was one of three spinners, along with Ajaz Patel and Ish Sodhi, named in New Zealand's squad for a series against Pakistan, and ahead of the series he played tour matches in the United Arab Emirates for New Zealand A to prepare and fight for a spot in the team. After he played well for New Zealand A he took a few days off to recover from kneecap irritation. He was initially only expected to miss the first ODI against Pakistan, but he was later ruled out of the tour altogether and forced to return home early. Astle recovered from his injury and returned to first-class cricket in New Zealand, where in February 2019, during the 2018–19 Plunket Shield season, he became the leading wicket-taker for Canterbury, going past Mark Priest's total of 290 dismissals.

Astle returned to New Zealand's national team in February for their home ODI and Test series against Bangladesh. Because of his strong form and Ish Sodhi's struggles, he appeared to be New Zealand's favoured second spinner for the 2019 Cricket World Cup alongside Mitchell Santner, but when New Zealand announced their squad in April 2019 they selected Sodhi rather than Astle because Sodhi had more international experience.

Following the World Cup, Astle was among four spin bowlers chosen to play for New Zealand in their Test series in Sri Lanka, where he'd made his Test debut seven years earlier.

=== 2020 onwards ===
In November 2019, Astle was named in New Zealand's Test squad for their Test series against Australia. He played in the third Test of the series, taking 3 wickets overall in the match.

Astle was named in New Zealand's T20I squad for their T20I series against Bangladesh. He only played in the third T20I and finished with his career best T20I figures of 4-13 which included the wickets of Mohammad Naim, Najmul Hossain Shanto, Afif Hossain and Mahedi Hasan. In August 2021, Astle was named in New Zealand's squad for the 2021 ICC Men's T20 World Cup, where he did not get a game. He was then selected for a T20 series against India, and returned with unimpressive figures of 0/34 in 3 overs in the first T20 at Jaipur.
