= Samuel Ongley =

Samuel Ongley may refer to:

- Samuel Ongley (died 1726), MP for Maidstone
- Samuel Ongley (died 1747), MP for Bedford and New Shoreham
