= Arthur Ongley =

New Zealand lawyer, politician, and cricket and rugby union player

Arthur Ongley OBE

Mayor of Feilding
- In office 1913–1919
- Preceded by: Edmund Goodbehere
- Succeeded by: George Joseph Harford

Personal details
- Born: Arthur Montague Ongley; 21 June 1882 Oamaru, New Zealand
- Died: 7 October 1974 (aged 92) Palmerston North, New Zealand
- Relatives: Joe Ongley (son); Mont Ongley (brother)
- Cricket career

Cricket information
- Bowling: Right-arm leg-spin

Domestic team information
- Years: Team
- 1901–02: Hawke's Bay

Career statistics
Competition	First-class
Matches	4
Runs scored	8
Batting average	1.33
100s/50s	0/0
Top score	3 not out
Balls bowled	210
Wickets	4
Bowling average	32.75
5 wickets in innings	0
10 wickets in match	0
Best bowling	2/45
Catches/stumpings	1/0
- Source: Cricket Archive, 30 August 2015

Arthur Montague "Joe" Ongley OBE (21 June 1882 – 17 October 1974) was a New Zealand lawyer, politician, and cricket and rugby union player and administrator. Born in Oamaru, he later lived in Wellington, Napier, and Hokitika, before settling in Feilding. He excelled in a number of sports and Ongley Park in Palmerston North, used for cricket and rugby, is named for him. His most notable sporting activity was as a cricketer, and he played four first-class matches. He served as an administrator on the New Zealand Cricket Council and was the organisation's president. He was a solicitor and then barrister in Feilding, and became Crown Solicitor in Palmerston North. He was a member of the Feilding Borough council and was the town's mayor from 1913 to 1919.

== Early life ==
Ongley was born in Oamaru, the son of a gardener, Frederick Ongley (died 1944 in Wellington) and his wife, Mary Ann Ongley (née Mullin). His father, born in Sussex, arrived in New Zealand in 1872 and settled in Oamaru, where he and Mary Ann married in 1877.

Frederick "Fred" William Ongley (1879–1969), a judge at the Compensation Court, was Arthur's elder brother. The geologist Mont Ongley (1888–1976) was a younger brother. Arthur attended St. Patrick's College, Wellington.

== Sport ==
Ongley excelled at a number of sports, and in sports circles was known as "Joe". While living in Feilding, he became champion at both local tennis clubs.

=== Cricket career ===
Ongley learned his cricket in Oamaru. After his time in Wellington, he moved to Napier, where he was coached by Albert Trott and represented Hawke's Bay in two first-class matches in 1901–02. He then moved to Hokitika in Westland, where, playing for the Hokitika team in local cricket in 1902–03, he took 55 wickets with his leg-spin for only 147 runs. Representing a Westland XXII against Lord Hawke's XI that season, on a matting pitch in Greymouth, he took 8 for 36 off 23 overs, bowling unchanged throughout the innings, and dismissed the English team for 69 in the first innings after Westland had made 111.

The New Zealand Prime Minister Richard Seddon, who was also Hokitika's member of parliament, sent Ongley a telegram of congratulations. Noting Ongley's accuracy and his ability to turn the ball either way, the English batsman Pelham Warner suggested he be considered for the New Zealand team to play Lord Hawke's XI. He was selected for the South Island team against Lord Hawke's XI a few weeks later but bowled only six overs for one wicket.

Ongley moved back to the North Island, this time to Feilding. He represented Manawatu at cricket from 1906 to 1935. He played in the first-ever match in the Hawke Cup in December 1910, bowling unchanged through both innings and taking 5 for 13 and 7 for 84 in Manawatu's victory over Wairarapa. He was a member of the Manawatu team that held the Hawke Cup from February 1928 to March 1930.

He served as President of the New Zealand Cricket Council. He was a fervent advocate for the interests of the Minor Associations of New Zealand cricket from 1923 until finally, in 1950–51, the Central Districts team was admitted to the Plunket Shield. He was president of the Central Districts Cricket Association from 1949 to 1955 and was known as the father of Central Districts cricket.

=== Rugby career ===
Ongley represented North Otago, Hokitika and Manawatu at rugby union. In 1938 he became president of the New Zealand Rugby Union. Ongley Park in Palmerston North is named after him.

== Legal career ==
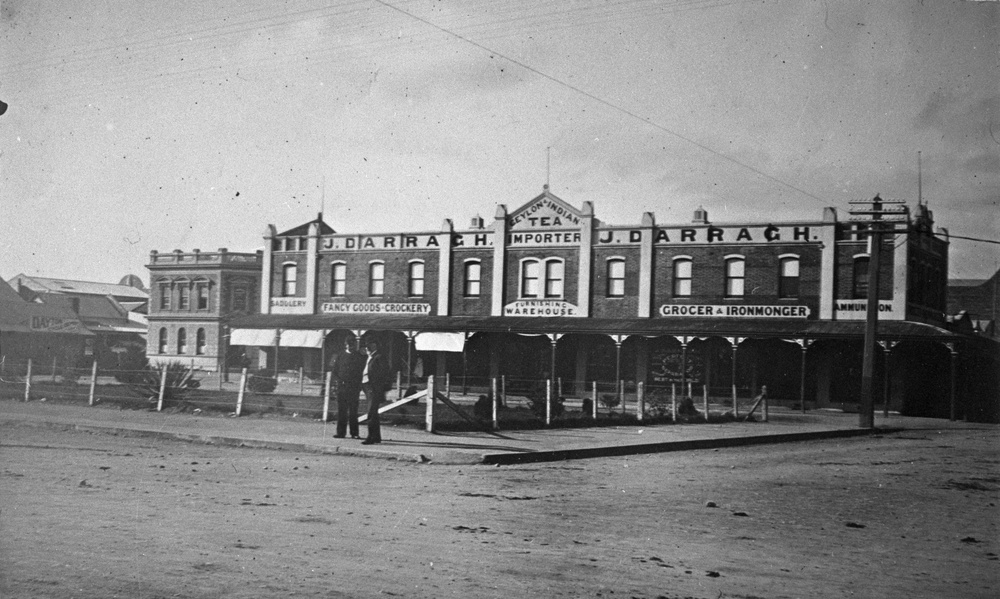
Darragh's Building, Feilding

Ongley joined the clerical staff at the courthouse in Palmerston North in August 1904, having come from Hokitika. He qualified as a solicitor in 1906, when he was admitted by the Chief Justice, Robert Stout, during a sitting of the Supreme Court in Palmerston North, and resigned from the court staff and set himself up as a solicitor in Darragh's building in Feilding facing Manchester Square. At the same time, he moved from Palmerston North to Feilding. He qualified as a barrister in 1911. He became Crown Solicitor in Palmerston North. In 1953, he was awarded the Queen Elizabeth II Coronation Medal, and he was appointed an Officer of the Order of the British Empire in the 1959 New Year Honours in recognition of his services to the law.

== Political career ==
Ongley was a member of the borough council at Feilding; he joined the council elected unopposed when a vacancy occurred in September 1910. At the biennial election in April 1911, he was confirmed as one of the nine borough councillors. The day after his wedding, he started his election campaign for mayor, challenging the incumbent mayor, Edmund Goodbehere. After a strong contest and a record voter turnout, Ongley defeated the incumbent on 30 April 1913 by five votes (658 votes to 653). He was Mayor of Feilding from 1913 to 1919. In the 1915 mayoral election, he was returned elected unopposed.

== Personal life ==
On 26 March 1913, Ongley married Nora Crina Lynch at St Patrick's Church at Palmerston North. She was the daughter of J. Lynch of Kildare, Duke Street, Palmerston North. Jimmy Nash, the Mayor of Palmerston North, was the master of ceremonies at their reception. They had two sons and a daughter. Their son Joe played cricket for New Zealand, was the inaugural captain of Central Districts, became a judge of the New Zealand Supreme Court, and was knighted.
