= Mont Ongley =

New Zealand geologist and scientific administrator (1888–1976)

Montague Ongley (10 December 1888 – 6 March 1976) was a New Zealand geologist and scientific administrator. He was born in Oamaru, Otago, New Zealand in 1888 and received his education at Waitaki Boys' High School, where the rector pioneered the teaching of geology at secondary school level. Ongley studied geology at the University of Otago under Patrick Marshall.
