= South African cricket team in New Zealand in 1994–95 =

International cricket tour

	New Zealand	South Africa
- Dates: 20 February 1995 – 8 March 1995
Captains	Ken Rutherford	Hansie Cronje

Test series
- Result: South Africa won the 1-match series 1–0
Most runs	Adam Parore (113)	Hansie Cronje (142)
Most wickets	Dion Nash (5); Gavin Larsen (5)	Fanie de Villiers (6)

The South African national cricket team toured New Zealand in February and March 1995 and played a single Test match against the hosts to celebrate the centenary of the New Zealand Cricket Council, as well as a pair of tour games. The tour was the South African team's first to New Zealand since 1964, and their seventh overseas tour since their readmission to the International Cricket Council in 1991. South Africa won the single Test match by 93 runs.

== Background ==
New Zealand and South Africa had only recently played each other, as New Zealand team's tour during the 1994–95 period had been to South Africa, where they had played a three-match Test series against the hosts, as well as a quadrangular one-day tournament also involving Pakistan and Sri Lanka. For South Africa, this was their only tour of the period, having also played a home Test against Pakistan.

== Squads ==
=== New Zealand ===
Ken Rutherford (c), Darrin Murray, Bryan Young, Martin Crowe, Mark Greatbatch, Stephen Fleming, Shane Thomson, Adam Parore, Matthew Hart, Gavin Larsen, Dion Nash, Danny Morrison

=== South Africa ===
Hansie Cronje (capt), Gary Kirsten, Andrew Hudson, Rudi Steyn, Daryl Cullinan, Michael Rindel, Jonty Rhodes, D.J.Callaghan, Steven Jack, Dave Richardson, Pat Symcox, Craig Matthews, E.O.Simons, C.E.Eksteen, Fanie de Villiers, Allan Donald

== Matches ==
=== Tour matches ===
==== Wellington v South Africans ====
20 February 1995
Scorecard

Wellington; 234/6 (50 overs)	v	South Africans; 234/7 (50 overs)
MW Douglas 100; SD Jack 2/32 (9 overs)		G Kirsten 85; LJ Doull 3/34 (8 overs)

Match tied
Basin Reserve, Wellington
Umpires: CE King and EA Watkin

- Wellington won the toss and elected to bat

==== New Zealand Academy XI v South Africans ====
27 February–1 March 1995 (3-day match)
Scorecard

New Zealand Academy XI	v	South Africans
120 (41.2 overs); NJ Astle 49; AA Donald 4/39 (13.2 overs); SD Jack 4/47 (14 overs)		165 (55.3 overs); DJ Cullinan 51; KP Walmsley 5/73 (16.3 overs)
126 (59.5 overs); RA Jones 30; CR Matthews 4/23 (16 overs)		85/2 (21.5 overs); AC Hudson 52*; KP Walmsley 1/20 (8 overs); PJ Wiseman 1/29 (5.5 overs)

South Africans won by eight wickets
Trafalgar Park, Nelson
Umpires: CE King and DM Quested

- New Zealand Academy XI won the toss and elected to bat

=== Test match ===
4–8 March 1995
(5-day match)
Scorecard

South Africa	v	New Zealand
294 (105.3 overs); DJ Cullinan 96 (164); DJ Nash 4/72 (27 overs)		328 (140.4 overs); AC Parore 89 (126); AA Donald 4/88 (32.4 overs)
308/6d (105 overs); WJ Cronje 101 (155); GR Larsen 2/31 (18 overs)		181 (55.5 overs); KR Rutherford 56 (60); PS de Villiers 4/42 (18 overs)

South Africa won by 93 runs
Eden Park, Auckland
Umpires: RS Dunne (NZ) and DB Hair (AUS)
Player of the match: WJ Cronje (SA)

- South Africa won the toss and elected to bat.
