= List of international cricket five-wicket hauls by Chaminda Vaas =

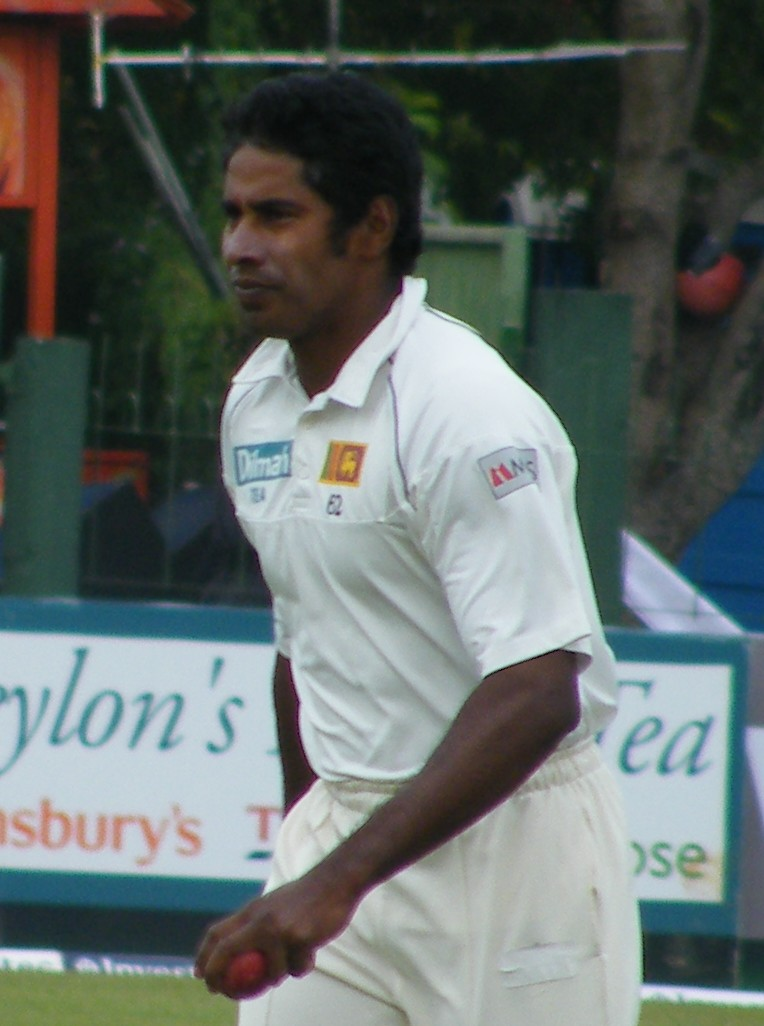
Vaas has captured the second-highest number of five-wicket hauls for Sri Lanka.

In cricket, a bowler taking five or more wickets in a single innings is known as a five-wicket haul or fifer, and is regarded as a notable achievement. and as of October 2024, only 54 bowlers have taken 15 or more five-wicket hauls at international level in their cricketing careers. Chaminda Vaas, a former Sri Lankan cricketer and current fast bowling coach of the Sri Lankan team, has a total of 16 five-wicket hauls to his name, with twelve in Tests and four in One Day Internationals (ODIs). As a left-arm fast-medium bowler, he was accurate and particularly skilled in bowling both swing and reverse swing. Vaas often played a supporting role to Muttiah Muralitharan, Sri Lanka's off spinner and leading wicket taker. (Note: According to former Sri Lankan cricketer Aravinda de Silva, "... Vaas has helped Murali take many, many wickets thanks to his ability to keep a batsman tied down and guessing", similar to the way Glenn McGrath complemented the bowling of Shane Warne. However, on occasion he has been described as a bowler who did not get the recognition he deserved despite his achievements, due to being overshadowed by Muralitharan.) In the period from 1995 to their retirement from international cricket, the two bowlers accumulated 1,155 Test wickets and paved the way for many of Sri Lanka's victories.

Having made his Test debut in August 1994 against Pakistan, Vaas took his first five-wicket haul seven months later in March 1995 against New Zealand. He repeated the feat in New Zealand's second innings, taking a total of 10 wickets and led Sri Lanka to their first ever overseas Test win. His career-best bowling is the seven wickets he took against the West Indies for 71 runs in November 2001. He had taken another seven wickets in the first innings of the same match, bringing the total to 14 and making it the highest number of wickets he has taken in a single match. It is also the second-best bowling performance by a Sri Lankan bowler after Muralitharan's 16 wickets for 220 runs in 1998. Vaas is ranked third among Sri Lankan bowlers by the number of Test five-wicket hauls, behind spinners Muralitharan and Rangana Herath. (Note: All world and Sri Lankan records are as of March 2013.)

Vaas made his ODI debut in February 1994 against India, but was unable to get a five-wicket haul for several years. His first was in October 2000 against the same team, when he took five wickets for 14 runs as he and Muralitharan led the Sri Lankans to the biggest ODI victory at the time. In December 2001, Vaas recorded the best bowling figures in ODI history, taking eight wickets for 19 runs against Zimbabwe. This is also the only occasion where a bowler managed to take eight wickets in an ODI innings. In addition, the six wickets he took for 25 runs against Bangladesh during the 2003 Cricket World Cup are the best figures recorded by a Sri Lankan bowler in a World Cup match.

Vaas played his last ODI in August 2008 and his last Test match in July 2009. He also played six Twenty20 International matches but did not manage to get a five-wicket haul in the format. His total of 16 five-wicket hauls is the second highest for a Sri Lankan bowler, after Muralitharan's 77. During his international career, Vaas took 355 Test wickets and 400 ODI wickets, (Note: He is ranked fourth by the number of ODI wickets, with only three other bowlers (Muralitharan, Wasim Akram and Waqar Younis) having taken 400 or more as of March 2013.) making him the most successful fast bowler in Sri Lankan cricket history.

== Key ==
Key
Symbol	Meaning
Date	Day the Test started or ODI held
Inn	Innings in which five-wicket haul was taken
Overs	Number of overs bowled
Runs	Number of runs conceded
Wkts	Number of wickets taken
Econ	Runs conceded per over
Batsmen	Batsmen whose wickets were taken
Result	Result for the Sri Lanka team
*	One of two five-wicket hauls by Vaas in a match
†	10 or more wickets taken in the match
‡	Vaas was selected as man of the match

== Tests ==
Five-wicket hauls in Test cricket
No.	Date	Ground	Against	Inn	Overs	Runs	Wkts	Econ	Batsmen	Result
1	11 March 1995 * † ‡	McLean Park, Napier	New Zealand	2	18.5	47	5	2.49	Darrin Murray; Stephen Fleming; Shane Thomson; Gavin Larsen; Kerry Walmsley	Won
2	11 March 1995 * † ‡	McLean Park, Napier	New Zealand	4	26.4	43	5	1.61	Darrin Murray; Ken Rutherford; Dion Nash; Danny Morrison; Kerry Walmsley	Won
3	18 March 1995 ‡	Carisbrook, Dunedin	New Zealand	2	40	87	6	2.17	Bryan Young; Darrin Murray; Mark Greatbatch; Adam Parore; Chris Pringle; Kerry Walmsley	Drawn
4	8 September 1995	Arbab Niaz Stadium, Peshawar	Pakistan	1	29	99	5	3.41	Aamer Sohail; Rameez Raja; Inzamam-ul-Haq; Shoaib Mohammad; Moin Khan	Lost
5	15 March 2001	Sinhalese Sports Club Ground, Colombo	England	2	27.5	73	6	2.62	Mike Atherton; Michael Vaughan; Craig White; Ashley Giles; Andy Caddick; Darren Gough	Lost
6	29 November 2001 * † ‡	Sinhalese Sports Club Ground, Colombo	West Indies	1	32.2	120	7	3.71	Daren Ganga; Chris Gayle; Brian Lara; Carl Hooper; Marlon Samuels; Mervyn Dillon; Pedro Collins	Won
7	29 November 2001 * † ‡	Sinhalese Sports Club Ground, Colombo	West Indies	3	25	71	7	2.84	Daren Ganga; Chris Gayle; Ramnaresh Sarwan; Mervyn Dillon; Dinanath Ramnarine; Pedro Collins; Marlon Black	Won
8	1 July 2004	Marrara Oval, Darwin	Australia	1	18.3	31	5	1.67	Matthew Hayden; Matthew Elliott; Simon Katich; Jason Gillespie; Glenn McGrath	Lost
9	11 August 2004	Sinhalese Sports Club Ground, Colombo	South Africa	4	18	29	6	1.61	Martin van Jaarsveld; Jacques Kallis; Jacques Rudolph; Mark Boucher; Nicky Boje; Makhaya Ntini	Won
10	11 April 2005	Basin Reserve, Wellington	New Zealand	2	40	108	6	2.70	Craig Cumming; James Marshall; Hamish Marshall; Nathan Astle; Stephen Fleming; Brendon McCullum	Lost
11	22 July 2005	Asgiriya Stadium, Kandy	West Indies	2	15	22	6	1.46	Xavier Marshall; Runako Morton; Shivnarine Chanderpaul; Sylvester Joseph; Denesh Ramdin; Daren Powell	Won
12	22 March 2008 ‡	Providence Stadium, Guyana	West Indies	4	22.2	61	5	2.73	Devon Smith; Marlon Samuels; Shivnarine Chanderpaul; Jerome Taylor; Daren Powell	Won

== One Day Internationals ==
Five-wicket hauls in ODI cricket
No.	Date	Ground	Against	Inn	Overs	Runs	Wkts	Econ	Batsmen	Result
1	29 October 2000	Sharjah Cricket Association Stadium, Sharjah	India	2	9.3	14	5	1.47	Sourav Ganguly; Sachin Tendulkar; Yuvraj Singh; Vinod Kambli; Zaheer Khan	Won
2	8 December 2001 ‡	Sinhalese Sports Club Ground, Colombo	Zimbabwe	1	8	19	8	2.37	Dion Ebrahim; Grant Flower; Stuart Carlisle; Andy Flower; Craig Wishart; Tatenda Taibu; Heath Streak; Mluleki Nkala	Won
3	14 February 2003 ‡	City Oval, Pietermaritzburg	Bangladesh	1	9.1	25	6	2.72	Hannan Sarkar; Al Sahariar; Mohammad Ashraful; Ehsanul Haque; Sanwar Hossain; Mashrafe Mortaza	Won
4	6 January 2006	Westpac Stadium, Wellington	New Zealand	1	10	39	5	3.90	Jamie How; Stephen Fleming; Scott Styris; Chris Cairns; Brendon McCullum	Lost
