= New Zealand cricket team in South Africa in 1994–95 =

International cricket tour

	South Africa	New Zealand
- Dates: 9 November 1994 – 6 January 1995
Captains	WJ Cronje	KR Rutherford

Test series
- Result: South Africa won the 3-match series 2–1
Most runs	DJ Richardson (247)	SA Thomson (246)
Most wickets	PS de Villiers (20)	MN Hart (15)
- Player of the series: DJ Richardson (South Africa)

The New Zealand national cricket team toured South Africa from November 1994 to January 1995 and played a three-match Test series against the South Africa national cricket team. The tour was the third time that New Zealand had visited South Africa and their first tour to the country since the end of the apartheid regime which had led to a sporting boycott of South Africa. (Note: The previous New Zealand tours to South Africa had taken place in 1953–54 and 1961–62.) South Africa won the Test series 2–1, despite New Zealand having won the first match of the series – the first time that a team had lost a three-match series after having led since 1888 when Australia had lost against England. New Zealand also competed in the Mandela Trophy with South Africa, Sri Lanka and Pakistan but were eliminated in the group stage, not winning any of their matches.

The tour saw the New Zealand team in "disarray" and criticised for their lack of discipline on the field. Four players were later suspended as a result of their off-field behaviour during the tour, three for smoking cannabis, and the New Zealand captain, Ken Rutherford, was twice sanctioned by the ICC match referee Peter Burge. Rutherford was sacked later in the season following a domestic season which "degenerated into a series of traumas" and the tour manager, Mike Sandlant, and coach Geoff Howarth both left their posts as a result of their handling of the team during the tour. A report by Director of New Zealand Cricket, Roddy Fulton, condemned Ken Rutherford's poor captaincy and lack of team management skills. The report was leaked by an unknown source to New Zealand media which subsequently revealed a number of management failings by Fulton's former teammate Geoff Howarth and the team's senior players. The tour has been called the "Sex, Drugs and Rock 'n Roll" tour and is considered to have had a major influence on the ways in which New Zealand Cricket administered the international team for years ahead.

The tour immediately followed New Zealand's involvement in the Wills World Series in India in October 1994, the majority of the team travelling directly from India to South Africa. New Zealand had not won any of their four matches during the Wills series.

The organisation of the Test series by the United Cricket Board of South Africa was praised by Wisden. Over 150,000 spectators watched the three matches, the Board putting in place a system of reducing ticket prices throughout each day in order to attract more spectators. The policy was successful and the number of younger people who attended matches was picked out by the Almanack as a particular success. Developments to the TV umpire system, which had been introduced during Australia's tour the previous summer, and both countries agreeing to a minimum of 90 overs per day were also credited by Wisden. (Note: Both the use of TV Umpires and a minimum of 90 overs being bowled during a days play have since become standard in international cricket.)

== Tour party ==
The New Zealand team was captained by Ken Rutherford in his last tour as captain. Martin Crowe, who became New Zealand's record run scorer in Test matches during the tour, was the vice-captain. Mark Priest was included in the tour party during the Mandela Trophy matches after having flown in as a replacement for the injured Matthew Hart who had broken a finger. Danny Morrison, who was originally not available for selection due to injury, joined the tour in its later stages as a replacement for Dion Nash who had suffered a team injury. Morrison played in the final three matches, including the second and third Tests.

With the addition of Crowe, who was already in South Africa rehabilitating from a knee injury, Lee Germon and Murphy Su'a, the Test team was the same team which had played in the Wills World Series immediately before the tour. The party included two uncapped players: Darrin Murray made his Test debut in the first Test of the series, having played in one of the ODIs in India, while Lee Germon made his ODI debut during the Mandela Trophy matches. Influential all-rounder Chris Cairns, who went on to play over 250 international matches, missed the tour with an injury.

The tour party was considered to be fairly weak due injuries and a lack of depth in talent in New Zealand cricket at the time. Speaking in 2017, Rutherford was of the opinion that "there was [no one] we left back home who deserved to play."

- Ken Rutherford (captain)
- Martin Crowe (vice-captain)
- Richard de Groen
- Simon Doull
- Stephen Fleming
- Lee Germon
- Chris Harris
- Matthew Hart
- Blair Hartland
- Danny Morrison (replacement for Dion Nash)
- Darrin Murray
- Dion Nash
- Adam Parore
- Mark Priest (ODIs only as a replacement for Matthew Hart)
- Chris Pringle
- Murphy Su'a
- Shane Thomson
- Bryan Young

The South African team was captained by Hansie Cronje in his first series as captain, having replaced Kepler Wessels following the team's failure to win a match in the 1994–95 Wills Triangular Series in Pakistan. (Note: The 1994–95 Wills Triangular Series was a triangular One Day International series between Pakistan, Australia and South Africa which took place in Pakistan in October 1994. This is distinct from the Wills World Series, a triangular series between India, New Zealand and West Indies which took place in India during October and early November 1994. The two series overlapped and were sponsored by the same company. Each featured one of the teams which played during this tour.) Wessels resigned the captaincy in November before the first Test match to focus on his own batting performances but a "recurring" knee injury led to his retirement from international cricket in December without him playing a match during the tour.

== Test series ==
The first Test match in the series was played in late November after a series of warm-up matches. The second and third Tests were played between 26 December and 6 January after the Mandela Trophy ODI series. South Africa were without their leading fast bowler Allan Donald throughout the series due to injury. Donald had played in every Test match since the reintegration of South Africa into international cricket in 1992. This and the absence of former captain Kepler Wessels, also through injury, left wicket-keeper Dave Richardson as the only player to have played in each Test since reintegration.

Richardson, who was the leading run scorer of the series, was named the player of the series.

=== First Test ===
The first Test was played at Wanderers Stadium in Johannesburg. New Zealander Darrin Murray made his Test debut in the match.

New Zealand won the toss and chose to bat first on a cracked pitch which looked as if it may cause problems for batsmen – Wisden wrote that "Both teams distrusted the pitch" although it "played well enough until the fourth day". New Zealand scored 411 in their first innings after a good first day and then an innings of 84 by Shane Thomson lower down the order and a tenth wicket partnership of 57 runs.

In reply South Africa scored 279 with Dave Richardson, who batted with a broken thumb, top scoring with 83. Martin Crowe set a new New Zealand record for the number of Test match catches during the innings, catching Richard Snell to pass Jeremy Coney's 64 catches. Fannie De Villiers bowled "brilliantly" to reduce New Zealand to 34/5 in their second innings before lower order runs once again helped to raise their score to 194, a lead of over 300. The wearing pitch with wide cracks (Note: A wearing or cracked pitch will help the bowling team as balls are more likely to deviate after hitting the pitch or turn due to spin bowling. Spin bowlers, such as Hart, will generally be more dangerous bowling on worn pitches.) helped create the conditions for a South African batting collapse on the last day of the match, the home team losing seven wickets for 39 runs on the final morning to be all out for 189, losing by 137 runs. Simon Doull, who was the man of the match, took four wickets in South Africa's second innings whilst Matthew Hart took 5/77 bowling into the rough outside off stump, setting new Test match best figures.

The New Zealand victory "stunned" South Africa, although an injury to bowler Dion Nash ruled him out of the rest of the tour.

25–29 November 1994	New Zealand	v	South Africa	New Zealand won by 137 runs
Scorecard; Wisden report	411 (145.5 overs); SA Thomson 84 (177 balls); CR Matthews 3/98 (28 overs)		279 (92 overs); DJ Richardson 93 (137 balls); MN Hart 3/57 (26 overs)	Wanderers Stadium, Johannesburg; Umpires: KE Liebenberg and ID Robinson; Player of the match: SB Doull (New Zealand)
Scorecard; Wisden report	194 (75 overs); AC Parore 49 (93 balls); CR Matthews 5/42 (19 overs)		189 (78.4 overs); WR Cronje 62 (154 balls); MN Hart 5/77 (32.4 overs)	Wanderers Stadium, Johannesburg; Umpires: KE Liebenberg and ID Robinson; Player of the match: SB Doull (New Zealand)
New Zealand won the toss and chose to bat; DJ Murray (New Zealand) made his Test match debut

=== Second Test ===
The second Test began on Boxing Day at Kingsmead in Durban. It followed the Mandela Series of ODI matches which had taken place at the beginning of December. South Africa gave debuts to Jack Commins and Steven Jack.

New Zealand again won the toss but lost quick wickets in their first innings due, Wisden said, to "injudicious shots". After losing five wickets for 66 runs, a recovery led by Shane Thomson, who top-scored with a score of 82, meant that the tourists scored a total of 185. In reply South Africa started strongly but then collapsed themselves, going from 110/2 to 182/9 before a last wicket stand of 44 left them with a narrow lead having scored 226.

After losing two early wickets, New Zealand opener Bryan Young scored the third slowest half-century in Test history, taking 333 minutes to reach 50 runs. Once he was out the batting collapsed again, the last six wickets falling for 48 runs, leaving South Africa a modest target of 152. They reached this with the loss of two wickets and Wisden was of the opinion that, following the loss of all of their matches in the One Day series and the disciplining of players before Christmas, New Zealand's "decline now looked terminal".

During New Zealand's second innings Martin Crowe set another New Zealand test record, becoming the country's leading Test match run scorer after he passed John Wright's record of 5,334 runs.

26–30 December 1994	New Zealand	v	South Africa	South Africa won by 8 wickets
Scorecard; Wisden report	185 (82 overs); SA Thomson 82 (135 balls); PS de Villiers 5/64 (24 overs)		226 (86.5 overs); DJ Richardson 39 not out (94 balls); SB Doull 5/73 (29.5 overs)	Kingsmead Cricket Ground, Durban; Umpires: CJ Mitchley and Khizer Hayat; Player of the match: PS de Villiers (South Africa)
Scorecard; Wisden report	192 (100.2 overs); BA Young 51 (238 balls); BM McMillan 3/53 (30 overs)		153/2 (45.4 overs); G Kirsten 66 not out (117 balls); SB Doull 1/26 (15 overs)	Kingsmead Cricket Ground, Durban; Umpires: CJ Mitchley and Khizer Hayat; Player of the match: PS de Villiers (South Africa)
New Zealand won the toss and chose to bat; JB Commins and SD Jack (both South Africa) made their Test match debuts MD Crowe became New Zealand's leading run scorer in Test cricket during the match

=== Third Test ===
The final Test of the series took place after the New Year at Newlands in Cape Town on a relaid pitch which was "unusually pacy" for the ground. A combination of poor New Zealand batting and good bowling by South Africa led to South Africa winning the match by seven wickets to seal a series win, the first time that a team had come back from 1–0 down in a three match series to win the series since 1888.

New Zealand again won the toss and chose to bat and were reduced to 96/5 before recovering to make a total of 288. In reply South Africa made 440, including centuries for captain Hansie Cronje and a first Test century for wicket-keeper Dave Richardson, whilst Test debutant opener Rudi Steyn made 38 runs. The slow pace of scoring meant that only five sessions remained in the match. (Note: A session in a Test match is a period of around two hours play between a break for either lunch or tea.) New Zealand, Wisden suggested, needed to bat for four of them to save the match and draw the series but poor batting, in particular falling into a trap set by Cronje of hooking or pulling in the air, (Note: A hook shot or pull sees the batsman play the ball to his leg team and is often as a result of short-pitched bowling which leads to the ball bouncing further from the batsman and, as a result, reaching the batter at a greater height. Hook shots or pull shots can be difficult to control and can lead to batsman being caught out.) saw them dismissed for 239, leaving South Africa 42 overs to score the 88 runs required for victory. They did so with 11 to spare and Wisden lamented the general approach of the New Zealand team which it considered "careless" with few of the team "still competing".

2–6 January 1995	New Zealand	v	South Africa	South Africa won by 7 wickets
Scorecard; Wisden report	288 (114.5 overs); SP Fleming 79 (160 balls); BM McMillan 4/65 (26 overs)		440 (181.2 overs); WJ Cronje 112 (235 balls); SA Thomson 3/65 (31 overs)	Newlands Cricket Ground, Cape Town; Umpires: KT Francis and SB Lambson; Player of the match: DJ Richardson (South Africa)
Scorecard; Wisden report	239 (111.1 overs); SP Fleming 53 (118 balls); PS de Villiers 5/61 (28.1 overs)		89/3 (31.2 overs); DJ Cullinan 28 (24 balls); MN Hart 2/51 (15.2 overs)	Newlands Cricket Ground, Cape Town; Umpires: KT Francis and SB Lambson; Player of the match: DJ Richardson (South Africa)
New Zealand won the toss and chose to bat; The match started late due to overnight rainfall; PJR Steyn (South Africa) made his Test debut

== One Day International matches ==
New Zealand played six One Day Internationals in the Mandela Trophy, playing twice against each of South Africa, Sri Lanka and Pakistan. New Zealand did not win a match during the series, losing all but their second match which was abandoned after a torrential thunderstorm flooded the ground after Sri Lanka had scored 288/4. The matches took place after the first Test match.

Following an injury to Matthew Hart, replacement Mark Priest played in New Zealand's first ODI of the tournament just hours after arriving in South Africa. New Zealand lost by 69 runs in a match played on a poor quality pitch which was the subject of an inquiry. Following the abandoned second match, during which Sanath Jayasuriya scored his maiden ODI century, the team lost their remaining four matches. Their third match of the tournament saw South Africa's Dave Callaghan follow Jayasuriya's lead and score an unbeaten 169 runs, his first ODI century, on a hard pitch which favoured the South African bowlers.

Their fourth match saw New Zealand bowled out for the third time, collapsing from 173/2 to lose their final eight wickets for just 28 runs, although they set a more challenging target in their fifth match before losing to Sri Lanka again. The match saw New Zealand captain Ken Rutherford fined half of his match fee for attempting to influence an umpire's decision. In their final match New Zealand were bowled out again, this time for 172 runs, with Pakistan's Waqar Younis taking a hat-trick to finish the innings.

6 December 1994	South Africa; 203/8 (50 overs)	v	New Zealand; 134 (39.5 overs)	South Africa won by 69 runs
Scorecard; Wisden report	South Africa; 203/8 (50 overs)	v	New Zealand; 134 (39.5 overs)	Newlands Cricket Ground, Cape Town; Umpires: SB Lambson and CJ Mitchley; Player of the match: MJR Rindel (South Africa)
Scorecard; Wisden report	WS Cronje 38 (63 balls); C Pringle 2/29 (10 overs)		KR Rutherford 40 (73 balls); MJR Rindel 2/15 (5 overs)	Newlands Cricket Ground, Cape Town; Umpires: SB Lambson and CJ Mitchley; Player of the match: MJR Rindel (South Africa)
South Africa won the toss and chose to bat; Points: South Africa 2, New Zealand 0				Newlands Cricket Ground, Cape Town; Umpires: SB Lambson and CJ Mitchley; Player of the match: MJR Rindel (South Africa)

8 December 1994	Sri Lanka; 288/4 (50 overs)	v	New Zealand; 66/1 (14.3 overs)	No result
Scorecard; Wisden report	Sri Lanka; 288/4 (50 overs)	v	New Zealand; 66/1 (14.3 overs)	Goodyear Park, Bloemfontein; Umpires: RE Koertzen and WA Diedricks
Scorecard; Wisden report	ST Jayasuriya 140 (143 balls); C Pringle 3/29 (10 overs)		AC Parore 31* (48 balls); R Pushpakumara 1/18 (5 overs)	Goodyear Park, Bloemfontein; Umpires: RE Koertzen and WA Diedricks
Sri Lanka won the toss and chose to bat; A thunderstorm forced the match to be abandoned after 14.3 overs of the New Zealand innings; LK Germon made his ODI debut for New Zealand Points: New Zealand 1, Sri Lanka 1				Goodyear Park, Bloemfontein; Umpires: RE Koertzen and WA Diedricks

11 December 1994	South Africa; 314/7 (50 overs)	v	New Zealand; 233 (40.3 overs)	South Africa won by 81 runs
Scorecard; Wisden report	South Africa; 314/7 (50 overs)	v	New Zealand; 233 (40.3 overs)	Centurion Park, Verwoerdburg; Umpires: KE Liebenberg and DL Orchard; Player of the match: DJ Callaghan (South Africa)
Scorecard; Wisden report	DJ Callaghan 169* (143 balls); ML Su'a 4/59 (10 overs)		AC Parore 108 (95 balls); DJ Callaghan 3/32 (6 overs)	Centurion Park, Verwoerdburg; Umpires: KE Liebenberg and DL Orchard; Player of the match: DJ Callaghan (South Africa)
South Africa won the toss and chose to bat; Points: South Africa 2, New Zealand 0				Centurion Park, Verwoerdburg; Umpires: KE Liebenberg and DL Orchard; Player of the match: DJ Callaghan (South Africa)

13 December 1994	New Zealand; 201 (49.4 overs)	v	Pakistan; 206/5 (46.2 overs)	Pakistan won by 5 wickets (with 22 balls remaining)
Scorecard; Wisden report	New Zealand; 201 (49.4 overs)	v	Pakistan; 206/5 (46.2 overs)	St George's Park Cricket Ground, Port Elizabeth; Umpires: RE Koertzen and CJ Mitchley; Player of the match: Aaqib Javed and Waqar Younis (both Pakistan)
Scorecard; Wisden report	MD Crowe 83 (99 balls); Waqar Younis 4/32 (10 overs)		Aamer Sohail 75 (95 balls); C Pringle 3/43 (10 overs)	St George's Park Cricket Ground, Port Elizabeth; Umpires: RE Koertzen and CJ Mitchley; Player of the match: Aaqib Javed and Waqar Younis (both Pakistan)
Pakistan won the toss and chose to field; Points: Pakistan 2, New Zealand 0				St George's Park Cricket Ground, Port Elizabeth; Umpires: RE Koertzen and CJ Mitchley; Player of the match: Aaqib Javed and Waqar Younis (both Pakistan)

18 December 1994	New Zealand; 255/4 (50 overs)	v	Sri Lanka; 257/5 (47.1 overs)	Sri Lanka won by 5 wickets (with 17 balls remaining)
Scorecard; Wisden report	New Zealand; 255/4 (50 overs)	v	Sri Lanka; 257/5 (47.1 overs)	Buffalo Park, East London; Umpires: CJ Mitchley and DL Orchard; Player of the match: KR Rutherford (New Zealand)
Scorecard; Wisden report	KR Rutherford 102 (98 balls); WPUJC Vaas 2/52 (10 overs)		HP Tillakaratne 68* (86 balls); DJ Nash 2/15 (5 overs)	Buffalo Park, East London; Umpires: CJ Mitchley and DL Orchard; Player of the match: KR Rutherford (New Zealand)
New Zealand won the toss and chose to bat; Points: Sri Lanka 2, New Zealand 0				Buffalo Park, East London; Umpires: CJ Mitchley and DL Orchard; Player of the match: KR Rutherford (New Zealand)

19 December 1994	New Zealand; 172 (47.4 overs)	v	Pakistan; 175/5 (38.5 overs)	Pakistan won by 5 wickets (with 67 balls remaining)
Scorecard; Wisden report	New Zealand; 172 (47.4 overs)	v	Pakistan; 175/5 (38.5 overs)	Buffalo Park, East London; Umpires: WA Diedricks and SB Lambson; Player of the match: Waqar Younis (Pakistan)
Scorecard; Wisden report	BR Hartland 44 (69 balls); Waqar Younis 4/33 (8.4 overs)		Aamer Sohail 52 (62 balls); MW Priest 2/27 (6 overs)	Buffalo Park, East London; Umpires: WA Diedricks and SB Lambson; Player of the match: Waqar Younis (Pakistan)
New Zealand won the toss and chose to bat; Points: Pakistan 2, New Zealand 0				Buffalo Park, East London; Umpires: WA Diedricks and SB Lambson; Player of the match: Waqar Younis (Pakistan)

== Other matches ==
As well as the international matches, four first-class and three other matches were played by the New Zealanders during the tour. The tour began with a friendly one-day match against NF Oppenheimer's XI and three first-class matches were played before the first Test match against Northern Transvaal, Griqualand West and Orange Free State. The New Zealanders drew with Northern Transvaal and beat Griqualand West by 23 runs before losing by two wickets to Orange Free State.

After the first Test match a friendly one-day match against a Transvaal Invitational XI and a List A match against Transvaal were played, the New Zealanders winning the friendly match but losing against Transvaal. A final first-class match was played after the Mandela Series matches and before the last two Test matches against Boland. The match was abandoned at the beginning of the second day after the umpires deemed the pitch too dangerous to continue with 22 wickets having fallen on the first day, both teams having been dismissed for less than 90 runs.

9 November 1994	New Zealanders; 232/5 declared (52 overs)	v	NF Oppenheimer's XI; 231/9 (56 overs)	Match drawn
Scorecard (subscription required)	New Zealanders; 232/5 declared (52 overs)	v	NF Oppenheimer's XI; 231/9 (56 overs)	NF Oppenheimer Ground, Randjesfontein; Umpires: DF Becker and MK van Nierop
Scorecard (subscription required)	MD Crowe 61 (75 balls); CEB Rice 3/23 (8 overs)		HA Page 59* (58 balls); C Pringle 2/44 (16 overs)	NF Oppenheimer Ground, Randjesfontein; Umpires: DF Becker and MK van Nierop
No toss; Friendly match.				NF Oppenheimer Ground, Randjesfontein; Umpires: DF Becker and MK van Nierop

11–13 November 1994	Northern Transvaal	v	New Zealanders	Match drawn
Scorecard (subscription required)	292 (87.5 overs); MJR Rindel 91 (98 balls); SB Doull 3/64 (21.5 overs)		356/9 declared (102.2 overs); SP Fleming 114 (117 balls); MJG Davis 4/53 (28.2 overs)	Centurion Park, Verwoerdburg; Umpires: SB Lambson and DL Orchard
Scorecard (subscription required)	84/0 (22 overs); CL Lambert 52 (71 balls)			Centurion Park, Verwoerdburg; Umpires: SB Lambson and DL Orchard
Northern Transvaal won the toss and chose to bat first; Three-day first-class match.

15–17 November 1994	New Zealanders	v	Griqualand West	New Zealanders won by 23 runs
Scorecard (subscription required)	285/5 declared (82 overs); CZ Harris 110 (192 balls); P McLaren 2/43 (11 overs)		218 (69.1 overs); HA Page 85 (108 balls); RP de Groen 5/34 (21 overs)	De Beers Oval, Kimberley; Umpires: RE Koertzen and CJ Mitchley
Scorecard (subscription required)	280/3 declared (72.5 overs); DJ Murray 109 (184 balls); FJJ Viljoen 1/32 (4.5 overs)		324 (77.3 overs); M Michau 95 (96 balls); SA Thomson 5/101 (25 overs)	De Beers Oval, Kimberley; Umpires: RE Koertzen and CJ Mitchley
New Zealanders won the toss and chose to bat first; Three-day first-class match.

19–22 November 1994	New Zealanders	v	Orange Free State	Orange Free State won by 2 wickets
Scorecard (subscription required)	538/7 declared (142.1 overs); AC Parore 127* (166 balls); NW Pretorius 5/182 (38.1 overs)		392/5 declared (129 overs); PJR Steyn 157 (318 balls); CZ Harris 3/55 (25 overs)	Springbok Park, Bloemfontein; Umpires: KE Liebenberg and WJ Wilson
Scorecard (subscription required)	234/3 declared (75 overs); MD Crowe 124* (173 balls); NW Pretorius 2/56 (15 overs)		383/8 (83.1 overs); LJ Wilkinson 89 (101 balls); DJ Nash 4/83 (21 overs)	Springbok Park, Bloemfontein; Umpires: KE Liebenberg and WJ Wilson
New Zealanders won the toss and chose to bat first; Four day first-class match CZ Harris took a hat-trick in the Orange Free State first innings

1 December 1994	New Zealanders; 252/6 (50 overs)	v	Transvaal Invitation XI; 243/8 (50 overs)	New Zealanders won by 9 runs
Scorecard (subscription required)	New Zealanders; 252/6 (50 overs)	v	Transvaal Invitation XI; 243/8 (50 overs)	Soweto Cricket Oval, Soweto
Scorecard (subscription required)	BR Hartland 81 (99 balls); S Tikolo 2/33 (10 overs)		MW Rushmere 80 (106 balls); C Pringle 3/52 (10 overs)	Soweto Cricket Oval, Soweto
Unknown; 50 over friendly match				Soweto Cricket Oval, Soweto

3 December 1994	New Zealanders; 214 (49.1 overs)	v	Transvaal; 216/2 (41 overs)	Transvaal won by 8 wickets
Scorecard (subscription required)	New Zealanders; 214 (49.1 overs)	v	Transvaal; 216/2 (41 overs)	Wanderers Stadium, Johannesburg; Umpires: AE Ball and SB Lambson
Scorecard (subscription required)	KR Rutherford 39 (62 balls); DR Laing 3/36 (10 overs)		SD Jack 107 (75 balls); RP de Groen 1/19 (6 overs)	Wanderers Stadium, Johannesburg; Umpires: AE Ball and SB Lambson
Transvaal won the toss and chose to bowl; 50 over List A match				Wanderers Stadium, Johannesburg; Umpires: AE Ball and SB Lambson

21–23 December 1994	Boland	v	New Zealanders	Match drawn
Scorecard (subscription required)	83 (41.2 overs); KM Curran 21 (40 balls); C Pringle 3/17 (12 overs)		86 (32.5 overs); SP Fleming 30 (37 balls); M Erasmus 6/22 (9 overs)	Boland Bank Park, Paarl; Umpires: BG Jerling and CJ Mitchley
Scorecard (subscription required)	31/3 (15 overs); JB Commins 15*; SB Doull 1/5 (3 overs)			Boland Bank Park, Paarl; Umpires: BG Jerling and CJ Mitchley
Boland won the toss and chose to bat first; Three day first-class match. The match was abandoned after one over on day two as a result of a pitch considered too dangerous for play.
