= New Zealand cricket team in England in 1994 =

International cricket tour

New Zealand in England in 1994
	England	New Zealand
- Dates: 29 April – 10 July 1994
Captains	Mike Atherton	Ken Rutherford

Test series
- Result: England won the 3-match series 1–0
Most runs	Mike Atherton (273)	Martin Crowe (380)
Most wickets	Phil DeFreitas (21)	Dion Nash (17)
- Player of the series: Phil DeFreitas (Eng) and Dion Nash (NZ)

One Day International series
- Results: England won the 2-match series 1–0
Most runs	Mike Atherton (81)	Bryan Young (65)
Most wickets	Chris Lewis (3)	Chris Pringle (5)

The New Zealand cricket team have toured England in the year 1994 and got scheduled to play three Test matches and two One Day Internationals. Earlier in 1994, the New Zealanders got lost a home series by Pakistan, 2–1, with the reverse swing of Wasim Akram and Waqar Younis proving decisive. They also draw a one-off test with India and split the ODI series with their two opponents evenly.

England were returning from defeat in the Caribbean, and had a new Chairman of Selectors - Ray Illingworth - who was expected to make changes to the squad. He duly did: Peter Such and Phillip DeFreitas were both recalled at the start of the summer, and Steve Rhodes, Craig White and Darren Gough all made their debuts in Illingworth's first days in charge.

The tourists' preparations were severely hampered by bad weather, which forced the abandonment of the second ODI, and injury - strike bowler Danny Morrison was ruled out of any part in the Test series.

== Squads ==
England	New Zealand
Mike Atherton(c); Steve Rhodes (wk); Phillip DeFreitas; Angus Fraser; Darren Gough; Graham Gooch; Graeme Hick; Devon Malcolm; Robin Smith; Alec Stewart; Peter Such; Paul Taylor; Craig White	Ken Rutherford (c); Adam Parore (wk); Martin Crowe; Heath Davis; Simon Doull; Stephen Fleming .; Mark Greatbatch; Matthew Hart; Blair Hartland; Gavin Larsen; Danny Morrison; Dion Nash; Michael Owens; Blair Pocock; Chris Pringle; Shane Thomson; Bryan Young

== Test matches ==
=== 1st Test ===
2–6 June 1994
Scorecard

New Zealand	v	England
251 (93.4 overs); Stephen Fleming 54 (102); Phil DeFreitas 4/94 (23 overs)		567/8d (174.4 overs); Graham Gooch 210 (317); Gavin Larsen 2/116 (44.4 overs)
226 (106.3 overs); Bryan Young 53 (87); Phil DeFreitas 5/71 (22.3 overs)

England won by an innings and 90 runs
Trent Bridge, Nottingham
Umpires: Dickie Bird (Eng) and Steve Bucknor (WI)
Player of the match: Graham Gooch (Eng)

- New Zealand won the toss and elected to bat.

Ray Illingworth's new broom was in evidence in the First Test, with wicket-keeper Steve Rhodes and all-rounder Craig White making their Test debuts for England, while Phillip DeFreitas and Peter Such, who missed the winter tour to the Caribbean, were recalled to the England side. For New Zealand, vice-captain Gavin Larsen made his Test debut, as did quick bowler Heath Davis.

The tourists won the toss and batted, but after surviving the initial burst from Devon Malcolm, the top order succumbed to DeFreitas (4-94), who drew three edges into the slip cordon and had captain Ken Rutherford adjudged lbw. Stephen Fleming (54) was the only batsman to have any answer to the England bowlers as New Zealand slipped to 108/5. Adam Parore and Matthew Hart put up some late-order resistance, but could only help the visitors to a total of 251. Coach Keith Fletcher described DeFreitas's efforts as "the best I have seen him bowl for a while" at the close of the first day.

In reply, England lost Alec Stewart very early, hitting Davis to Larsen at mid-on, but Graham Gooch, back in the side after opting to miss the tour of the West Indies, and Mike Atherton dug in and batted out the remainder of the day. The stand was broken at a superb 263 early on the third day, with Atherton falling for 101, but Gooch continued on his merry way, including adding a good stand with Robin Smith (78) before he eventually went for 210 (29 fours) in an innings just short of seven hours. Smith and Rhodes (49) added 68, and DeFreitas added to his earlier bowling exploits with a quick-fire half-century, before Atherton declared the innings on the fourth morning.

New Zealand's second innings started smoothly, with Blair Hartland and Bryan Young adding 59 before Hartland became DeFreitas's hundredth Test victim. Young went on to make 53, but that ended up being the tourists highest score. Such bowled extremely economically in the middle of the innings, his 34 overs conceding just 50 runs, and he picked up the wickets of Rutherford and Shane Thomson, and although Parore once again dug in to try to restore some pride, when DeFreitas (5-71) returned he wiped up the tail, finally removing Parore (42) caught behind as the last wicket.

Between the First and Second Tests, noted cricket writer Scyld Berry praised Atherton's captaincy and called for England to be ruthless and dominate the rest of the series in the same manner as they had won the First Test, noting that "a full length and a little swing are enough to expose New Zealand", who seemed heavily dependent on big scores from Martin Crowe to make a game of it.

=== 2nd Test ===
16–20 June 1994
Scorecard

New Zealand	v	England
476 (149.1 overs); Martin Crowe 142 (255); Phil DeFreitas 3/102 (35 overs)		281 (121 overs); Graeme Hick 58 (147); Dion Nash 6/76 (25 overs)
211/5d (68 overs); Bryan Young 94 (169); Phil DeFreitas 3/63 (16 overs)		254/8 (108 overs); Alec Stewart 119 (229); Dion Nash 5/93 (29 overs)

Match drawn
Lord's, London
Umpires: Steve Bucknor (WI) and Nigel Plews (Eng)
Player of the match: Dion Nash (NZ)

- New Zealand won the toss and elected to bat.

The Second Test saw Malcolm replaced by Paul Taylor, while Blair Pocock came into the New Zealand line-up for Hartland and bowlers Chris Pringle and Michael Owens replaced Davis and Larsen. New Zealand won the toss and batted first again, and although Rutherford and Fleming made starts, they looked in trouble at 138/4. Martin Crowe turned the innings around though: he and Shane Thomson (69) added 180 for the fifth wicket, a new record against England, with Crowe despatching the ball to all parts of the ground, despite struggling with a leg injury that saw him hobbling around late in the day. He was eventually caught at midwicket for 142, but Parore and Dion Nash (56) pushed the score up to 476.

Atherton and Alec Stewart got England's reply off to a solid start, but then the hosts slipped to 101/4. Graeme Hick (58) and White (51) added 92, stabilising the innings, and Rhodes made an unbeaten 32 in nearly four hours, but with limited support from the tail: Angus Fraser hung around for more than an hour, but England's total was definitely sub-par, and they only just scraped past the follow-on mark. Nash (6-76) starred with the ball for the New Zealanders and Hart was miserly, with figures of 44-21-50-1.

DeFreitas made quick work of the New Zealand top order the next morning, having Pocock and Rutherford leg before and Crowe clean bowled before any of them could make double figures, and at 29/3, it looked as though England make a comeback in the match. Young (94) and Fleming, and then Thomson, dug in and allowed the visitors to set a fourth innings target of 407 for England, which looked in danger when Atherton and Stewart got off to a flyer. Nash grabbed the wickets of Atherton and Gooch early on the final morning to stem the flow and set up a more tense day, but Stewart was undeterred, and added 76 with Smith and 74 with Hick, before also falling to Nash (5-93). White, DeFreitas and Fraser all fell quickly, giving the tourists hope of levelling the series, but Rhodes batted for two hours for his 24 not out, and England held on for the draw.

New Zealand were indebted to Crowe's batting and Nash's bowling, and came close to recording the victory. England skipper Atherton admitted that he'd found it too tense to watch the final half-hour, while Rutherford bemoaned the bad light that prevented him using his quicker bowlers at the end and felt they deserved to win, noting that "a draw wasn't a true reflection of the game".

=== 3rd Test ===
30 June – 5 July 1994
Scorecard

England	v	New Zealand
382 (146.3 overs); Mike Atherton 111 (281); Michael Owens 4/99 (34 overs)		151 (57.3 overs); Martin Crowe 70 (91); Darren Gough 4/47 (16.3 overs)
		308/7 (f/o) (106.2 overs); Martin Crowe 115 (237); Phil DeFreitas 3/60 (30 overs)

Match drawn
Old Trafford, Manchester
Umpires: Barry Lambson (SA) and David Shepherd (Eng)
Player of the match: Phil DeFreitas (Eng)

- England won the toss and elected to bat.
- Rest day on 3 July due to the men's singles final at Wimbledon.

Prior to the Third Test there was considerable debate in the English press about whether Robin Smith and Graeme Hick should retain their places in the England side after their recent failures, and vocal support for the inclusion of Graham Thorpe. However, the only change to the team saw Darren Gough make his Test debut in place of Paul Taylor. The visitors also made one change, Mark Greatbatch returning to the side to open the innings in place of Blair Pocock.

Atherton won the toss and chose to bat, a decision that his fellow top order batsmen made a mockery of as they collapsed around him to the seam of Nash and Owens. From 104/4 though, White (42) provided his captain with some support, and although 199/4 at the close of the first day wasn't a great score, it showed Atherton's character. Unbeaten on 96 overnight, he quickly moved to his century, but almost immediately lost White to Owens. When Atherton was finally dismissed for 111, and Rhodes followed him soon after, England's total (235/7) looked anaemic, but some solid late-order hitting from Gough (65) and DeFreitas (69) sent the New Zealand fielders scurrying to all parts of the ground, and they added a superb 130 before DeFreitas missed a straight one from Owens.

The tourists' reply started badly, with Gough and DeFreitas combining excellently with ball as well as bat, and removing the top four before the close on the second day, with only Martin Crowe defying the England seamers. Day three saw the pattern continue - Crowe (70) blasted his way through the bowling, but none of the other New Zealanders had an answer. Their coach, Geoff Howarth commented that "There were too many bad shots to get out, a lack of timing, feet not moving to the pitch of the ball, that sort of thing", indicating it was a lack of application, rather than lack of ability that was the problem.

Howarth's comments were emphasised with four wickets falling in similar fashion very quickly in the follow-on, leaving New Zealand 73/4, and with more than two full days still to play only an England victory looked likely. Crowe (115) and Parore (71) dug in though, adding 141 for the sixth wicket, a new record for the sixth wicket against England. Their partnership proved vital as the elements came to the visitors rescue - only 40 overs play was possible over the final two days - and although DeFreitas returned on the final day to pick up the wickets of the two stalwarts, New Zealand hung on for a draw.

== One Day Internationals ==
=== 1st ODI ===
19 May 1994
Scorecard

England; 224/8 (55 overs)	v	New Zealand; 182 (52.5 overs)
Mike Atherton 81 (137); Chris Pringle 5/45 (11 overs)		Bryan Young 65 (114); Chris Lewis 3/20 (9.5 overs)

England won by 42 runs
Edgbaston, Birmingham
Umpires: Roy Palmer (Eng) and Nigel Plews (Eng)
Player of the match: Mike Atherton (Eng)

- New Zealand won the toss and elected to field.
- Darren Gough and Shaun Udal (both Eng) made their ODI debuts.
- Chris Pringle took his only five-wicket haul in ODIs.

=== 2nd ODI ===
21–22 May 1994
Scorecard

England	v	New Zealand

Match abandoned
Lord's, London
Umpires: Alan Whitehead (Eng) and David Shepherd (Eng)

- Match abandoned without a ball bowled due to rain on the scheduled day (21 May) and a failed ground inspection on the reserve day (22 May).

== Tour summary ==
=== England ===
Ray Illingworth's first series in charge of the England side provided an insight into his selection policies, with the inclusion of Gough, White, and DeFreitas as prongs of the attack to supplement the tireless Fraser and erratic Malcolm, and the retention of the old guard of batsmen at the expense of younger talent such as Thorpe and John Crawley.

Atherton looked solid as captain, and proved that the greater pressure the team is under, the more he is able to respond with the bat - an excellent trait - but his skills in the field have yet to be seriously tested.

The series was won comfortably, and the performances of Atherton and DeFreitas in particular very encouraging for future series', but the New Zealanders presented less of a challenge than they might have done, and the result was as much a reflection of that as of the England performance. The subsequent series against South Africa would provide more of a benchmark for the team.

Mike Selvey commented on the success of the summer in The Guardian, but with caution: "To give all credit to Illingworth, however, would be wrong. English Test cricket began its upward mobility pre-Raymond, when Atherton was appointed captain. In the West Indies, with a young side, the learning curve went up as the tour progressed", and noted that "His loyalty to Robin Smith and Graeme Hick is probably going beyond the pale...the team must move on beyond these two..."

=== New Zealand ===
New Zealand will have been disappointed by their performances on this tour, consistently failing to deliver on their potential, and underperforming against the counties and in two of the three Tests. Only at Lord's, where they were unlucky not to win did they show the sort of attitude and performance that they could have displayed throughout the tour.

In fairness, the tourists were shorn of key members of their bowling attack: Danny Morrison made the tour party but was not fit to take part in the Test series, whilst Chris Cairns and Simon Doull did not make the squad. However, the bowling was less of a concern than the batting. Dion Nash performed superbly, picking up 17 wickets and Michael Owens and Matthew Hart provided admirable support, if lacking penetration. Captain Ken Rutherford noted at the end of the series that "...the balance of our side with Thomson, Hart and the three seamers is a good one. If we had Danny Morrison, Chris Cairns and Nash as our three front liners, that's useful."

Of the batsmen, only Martin Crowe and Adam Parore play consistently well. Bryan Young and Shane Thomson made promising cameos, and Stephen Fleming also looked a good prospect for the future, but New Zealand's reliance on Crowe's runs was evident in this series. The tourists only came close to winning the match he scored most heavily in, and he saved the Third Test with two vital innings providing the core of the resistance.

Following the series, partly in response to criticism from former Kiwi captain Glenn Turner, New Zealand Cricket announced that several of the problems identified during the tour were already being addressed, with new injury/fitness regimes being implemented.

== External sources ==
CricketArchive
