= Wills World Series =

International cricket tournament

1994–95 Wills world series
- Part of West Indian cricket team in India in 1994-95
- Date: 23 October–5 November 1994
- Location: India
- Result: India beat West Indies in the final
- Player of the series: Sachin Tendulkar (Ind)
Teams
India	New Zealand	West Indies
Captains
Mohammad Azharuddin	Ken Rutherford	Courtney Walsh
Most runs
Sachin Tendulkar (285)	Adam Parore (159)	Carl Hooper (222)
Most wickets
Sachin Tendulkar (8)	Matthew Hart (8)	Rajindra Dhanraj (6)

The 1994–95 Wills World Series (named after sponsor Wills of ITC Limited) was a One Day International (ODI) cricket tri-series where the India national cricket team played host to the West Indies national cricket team and New Zealand national cricket team. India and the West Indies reached the final at the Eden Gardens where close to 100,000 witnessed India beat the West Indies.

India lost only once, controversially to the West Indies in the last group game. Manoj Prabhakar and Nayan Mongia were accused of not making an effort to win the match after stonewalling the run-chase. The Indian authorities suspended Prabhakar and Mongia and the match referee Raman Subba Row docked the team two points for not playing in the spirit of the game. India protested the decision to the ICC, who ruled that the Row had exceeded his authority.

Subba Row also suspended the West Indies vice-captain Brian Lara for one game, for arguing with the umpire, who he thought should have consulted the third umpire before giving him out stumped.

New Zealand did not win any of their four games, though they were unlucky to see the match washed out after dismissing the West Indies cheaply in the opening game.

== Venues ==
Chennai	Kolkata	New Delhi	Margao	Vadodara	Kanpur	Guwahati
M. A. Chidambaram Stadium	Eden Gardens	Feroz Shah Kotla	Fatorda Stadium	Reliance Stadium	Green Park Stadium	Nehru Stadium

== Squads ==
India	New Zealand	West Indies
Mohammad Azharuddin (c); Atul Bedade; Rajesh Chauhan; Ajay Jadeja; Vinod Kambli; Anil Kumble; Nayan Mongia (wk); Manoj Prabhakar; Venkatesh Prasad; Venkatapathy Raju; Chetan Sharma; Navjot Singh Sidhu; Javagal Srinath; Sachin Tendulkar; Vijay Yadav (wk)	Ken Rutherford (c); Richard de Groen; Simon Doull; Stephen Fleming; Chris Harris; Matthew Hart; Blair Hartland; Darrin Murray; Dion Nash; Adam Parore (wk); Chris Pringle; Shane Thomson; Bryan Young	Courtney Walsh (c); Jimmy Adams; Keith Arthurton; Kenny Benjamin; Barrington Browne; Sherwin Campbell; Shivnarine Chanderpaul; Cameron Cuffy; Anderson Cummins; Rajindra Dhanraj; Roland Holder; Carl Hooper; Brian Lara; Phil Simmons; Stuart Williams

== Points table ==
Team	Pld	W	L	NR	Pts
India	4	3	1	0	12
West Indies	4	2	1	1	10
New Zealand	4	0	3	1	2

- Advanced to final

== Pool matches ==
=== 1st ODI ===
23 October 1994
Scorecard

West Indies; 221 (49.2 overs)	v	India; 225/6 (48.2 overs)
Brian Lara 74 (83); Sachin Tendulkar 3/36 (10 overs)		Mohammad Azharuddin 81 (84); Courtney Walsh 2/33 (10 overs)

India won by 4 wickets
M. A. Chidambaram Stadium, Chennai
Umpires: K. S. Giridharan (Ind) and K. Parthasarathy (Ind)
Player of the match: Mohammad Azharuddin (Ind)

- India won the toss and elected to field.
- Sherwin Campbell (Win) made his ODI debut.
- Points: India 4, West Indies 0.

=== 2nd ODI ===
26 October 1994
Scorecard

West Indies; 123 (39.1 overs)	v	New Zealand; 25/1 (9 overs)
Brian Lara 32 (38); Matthew Hart 5/22 (10 overs)		Bryan Young 13 (22); Courtney Walsh 1/17 (5 overs)

No result
Fatorda Stadium, Margao
Umpires: Borni Jamula (Ind) and Bala Murali (Ind)

- West Indies won the toss and elected to bat.
- Rajindra Dhanraj (Win) made his ODI debut.
- Points: New Zealand 2, West Indies 2.

=== 3rd ODI ===
28 October 1994
Scorecard

New Zealand; 269/4 (50 overs)	v	India; 271/3 (48.1 overs)
Ken Rutherford 108 (102); Manoj Prabhakar 2/49 (10 overs)		Sachin Tendulkar 115 (136); Matthew Hart 2/56 (10 overs)

India won by 7 wickets
IPCL Sports Complex Ground, Vadodara
Umpires: Shyam Bansal (Ind) and Suresh Shastri (Ind)
Player of the match: Sachin Tendulkar (Ind)

- New Zealand won the toss and elected to bat.
- Points: India 4, New Zealand 0.

=== 4th ODI ===
30 October 1994

West Indies; 257/6 (50 overs)	v	India; 211/5 (50 overs)
Keith Arthurton 72 (62) tendulkar 2/31 (8 overs)		manoj Prabhakar 102 (154); Anderson Cummins 1/39 (10 overs)

West Indies won by 46 runs
Green Park Stadium, Kanpur
Umpires: Jasbir Singh (India) and Chandra Sathe (India)
Player of the match: Keith Arthurton (Win)

- India won the toss and elected to field.
- Points: West Indies 4, India 0.

=== 5th ODI ===
1 November 1994

West Indies; 306/6 (50 overs)	v	New Zealand; 171/9 (50 overs)
Carl Hooper 111 (114); Dion Nash 3/48 (10 overs)		Chris Pringle 34 (22); Rajindra Dhanraj 4/26 (10 overs)

West Indies won by 135 runs
Nehru Stadium, Guwahati, Guwahati
Umpires: Subrata Banerjee (India) and M. R. Singh (India)
Player of the match: Carl Hooper (Win)

- West Indies won the toss and elected to bat.
- Points: West Indies 4, New Zealand 0.

=== 6th ODI ===
3 November 1994

India; 289/3 (50 overs)	v	New Zealand; 182 (45.4 overs)
Ajay Jadeja 90 (127); Matthew Hart 1/36 (9 overs)		Stephen Fleming 56 (48); Sachin Tendulkar 2/29 (10 overs)

India won by 107 runs
Feroz Shah Kotla, New Delhi, India
Umpires: Tej Handu (India) and Raman Sharma (India)
Player of the match: Sachin Tendulkar (Ind)

- India won the toss and elected to bat.
- Points: India 4, New Zealand 0.

== Final ==
=== 7th ODI ===
5 November 1994 (D/N)
Scorecard

India; 274/6 (50 overs)	v	West Indies; 202 (44 overs)
Sachin Tendulkar 66 (68); Rajindra Dhanraj 2/55 (10 overs)		Keith Arthurton 42 (59); Venkatapathy Raju 4/58 (10 overs)

India won by 72 runs
Eden Gardens, Kolkata, India
Umpires: V. K. Ramaswamy (Ind) and S. Venkataraghavan (Ind)
Player of the match: Sachin Tendulkar (Ind)

- West Indies won the toss and elected to field.
- Javagal Srinath (Ind) picked his 100th wicket in ODIs.
- India won the 1994-95 Wills World Series.
