= Sri Lankan cricket team in New Zealand in 1994–95 =

International cricket tour

The Sri Lankan national cricket team toured New Zealand February to April 1995 and played a two-match Test series against the New Zealand national cricket team. Sri Lanka won the series 1–0. New Zealand were captained by Ken Rutherford and Sri Lanka by Arjuna Ranatunga. In addition, the teams went on to play a three-match series of Limited Overs Internationals (LOI) which New Zealand won 2–1. This was the first time that Sri Lanka won a test as well as a test series in New Zealand.

== Test series summary ==
- 1st Test at McLean Park, Napier – Sri Lanka won by 241 runs
- 2nd Test at Carisbrook, Dunedin – match drawn

=== First Test ===
11–15 March 1995
(5–day match)
Scorecard

Sri Lanka	v	New Zealand
183 (69 overs); A Ranatunga 55 (111); DK Morrison 3/40 (19 overs)		109 (42.5 overs); SP Fleming 35 (61); WPUJC Vaas 5/47 (18.5 overs)
352 (144.3 overs); CI Dunusinghe 91 (240); DK Morrison 4/61 (25.3 overs)		185 (84.4 overs); MJ Greatbatch 46 (82); WPUJC Vaas 5/43 (26.4 overs)

Sri Lanka won by 241 runs
McLean Park, Napier
Umpires: DB Cowie (NZ) and SG Randell (AUS)
Player of the match: WPUJC Vaas (SL)

- New Zealand won the toss and elected to field.
- KP Walmsley (NZ) and CI Dunusinghe (SL) made their Test debuts.

=== Second Test ===
18–22 March 1995
(5–day match)
Scorecard

Sri Lanka	v	New Zealand
233 (87.5 overs); WPUJC Vaas 51 (107); C Pringle 3/51 (15 overs)		307 (139 overs); BA Young 84 (267); WPUJC Vaas 6/87 (40 overs)
411 (168.4 overs); AP Gurusinha 127 (429); DN Patel 4/96 (57 overs)		0/0 (0.1 overs)

Match drawn
Carisbrook, Dunedin
Umpires: DM Quested (NZ) and VK Ramaswamy (IND)
Player of the match: WPUJC Vaas (SL)

- New Zealand won the toss and elected to field.

== One Day Internationals (ODIs) ==
New Zealand won the series 2-1.

=== 1st ODI ===
26 March 1995
Scorecard

New Zealand; 271/6 (50 overs)	v	Sri Lanka; 238 (47.5 overs)
CL Cairns 72 (72); KR Pushpakumara 2/53 (10 overs)		PA de Silva 54 (78); JTC Vaughan 4/33 (10 overs)

New Zealand won by 33 runs
Lancaster Park, Christchurch
Umpires: BL Aldridge and DM Quested
Player of the match: KR Rutherford (NZ)

- Sri Lanka won the toss and elected to field.
- KJ Silva (SL) made his ODI debut.

=== 2nd ODI ===
29 March 1995
Scorecard

New Zealand; 280/6 (50 overs)	v	Sri Lanka; 117/6 (31 overs)
NJ Astle 95 (137); WPUJC Vaas 3/36 (10 overs)		HP Tillakaratne 39* (52); GR Larsen 2/20 (6 overs)

New Zealand won on faster scoring rate
Trust Bank Park, Hamilton
Umpires: BF Bowden and CE King
Player of the match: NJ Astle (NZ)

- New Zealand won the toss and elected to bat.
- When play was halted Sri Lanka needed to have scored 174 runs to win.
- JC Gamage (SL) made his ODI debut.

=== 3rd ODI ===
1 April 1995
Scorecard

Sri Lanka; 250/6 (50 overs)	v	New Zealand; 199 (46.3 overs)
AP Gurusinha 108 (149); DN Patel 2/28 (10 overs)		MJ Greatbatch 43 (53); ST Jayasuriya 3/35 (10 overs)

Sri Lanka won by 51 runs
Eden Park, Auckland
Umpires: DB Cowie and RS Dunne
Player of the match: ST Jayasuriya (SL)

- Sri Lanka won the toss and elected to bat.
- MC Mendis (SL) made his ODI debut.
