= Kerry Walmsley =

New Zealand cricketer (born 1973)

Personal information
- Full name: Kerry Peter Walmsley
- Born: 23 August 1973 (age 53); Dunedin, Otago, New Zealand
- Height: 1.98 m (6 ft 6 in)
- Batting: Right-handed
- Bowling: Right-arm fast-medium

International information
- National side: New Zealand (1995–2003)
- Test debut (cap 192): 11 March 1995 v Sri Lanka
- Last Test: 30 November 2000 v South Africa
- ODI debut (cap 135): 29 November 2003 v Pakistan
- Last ODI: 3 December 2003 v Pakistan

Domestic team information
- Years: Team
- 1994/95–1999/00: Auckland
- 2000/01–2002/03: Otago
- 2003/04–2005/06: Auckland

Career statistics
Competition	Test	ODI	FC	LA
Matches	3	2	67	67
Runs scored	13	–	709	318
Batting average	2.60	–	11.43	17.66
100s/50s	0/0	–	0/1	0/0
Top score	5	–	59	44
Balls bowled	774	120	12,596	3,335
Wickets	9	2	253	79
Bowling average	43.44	58.50	24.90	33.12
5 wickets in innings	0	0	10	0
10 wickets in match	0	0	1	0
Best bowling	3/70	1/53	7/28	4/24
Catches/stumpings	0/–	0/–	22/–	9/–
- Source: CricInfo, 2 May 2017

Kerry Peter Walmsley (born 23 August 1973) is a New Zealand former international cricketer. He played three Test matches and two One Day Internationals for the national side between 1995 and 2003 as a fast bowler. In domestic cricket Walmsley played for Auckland from the 1994–95 season until 1999–2000, Otago from 2000–01 to 2002–03, and Auckland again from 2003–04 to 2005–06.

== Early career ==
Walmsley was born at Dunedin in 1973. He played age-group cricket for Auckland from the 1991–92 season before making his debut for the representative side in November 1994, playing in a one-day match against Northern Districts. He made his first-class debut the following month, and after taking six wickets against Otago in February and another six, including his first five-wicket haul, playing for a New Zealand Academy side against the touring South Africans at the end of the month, he was called into the New Zealand national side for the Test series against the touring Sri Lankans. The New Zealand team was short of bowlers following a number of injuries and the suspension of players following the team's tour of South Africa earlier during the season.

At 1.98 metres (6 ft 6 in) and described as "a strong, fast-medium bowler" who swung the ball away from right-handed batsmen at the start of his career, Walmsley made his Test debut against Sri Lanka in March 1995 after having only played in three first-class matches during his debut season. The 21 year-old took a wicket with his seventh ball in Test cricket on a pitch which Wisden described as "tailored for the New Zealand medium-fast bowlers". He took another two during the Sri Lankan first innings, although his bowling was described by Wisden as "erratic". Following injuries to Dion Nash and Danny Morrison, Walmsley was retained in the side for the second Test match, taking three more wickets, but in the fallout which followed the loss of the series and the South African tour, he fell out of contention for the national side.

A series of injuries caused Walmsley to miss games for Auckland―he played only two first-class matches in each of the 1995–96 and 1996–97 seasons―and after playing only five matches for the representative side during the 1999–2000 season he moved to play for Otago, seeking more opportunities to play top-level cricket. He toured India with a New Zealand Academy side in August 2000 and was called back into the full national side as a replacement following more injuries to the side's bowlers during their 2000–01 tour of South Africa. He played in two first-class tour matches and was selected for the second Test match; in what was to be his final Test appearance he took two wickets.

== Later career ==
Walmsley played for three seasons in Otago. In his second season he was selected as the province's Player of the Year, taking 39 first-class and 11 List A wickets for the side in 2001–02. A further 37 first-class wickets the following season saw him move back to Auckland ahead of the 2003–04 season.

At the start of the 2003–04 domestic season Walmsley chose to tour Pakistan with the New Zealand One Day International (ODI) side. Due to safety concerns following the September 2001 attacks on the United States and the bomb blast which had cut short the team's previous tour of Pakistan in 2002, several first-choice players chose not to take part in the tour, providing the opportunity for Walmsley to play in two of the five ODIs on the tour. He took two wickets but was expensive and did not play for New Zealand during Pakistan's tour which immediately followed the series.

Walmsley did tour South Africa with the New Zealand A side in 2004, but played only two more seasons for Auckland, retiring after the end of the 2005–06 season. He played a total of 33 first-class matches for the province as well as 18 for Otago, taking 122 wickets for Auckland and 83 for Otago. He played for Bangor Cricket Club in North Wales for a number of seasons.

== Personal life ==
Whilst playing cricket Walmsley worked as a teacher and has since managed a rental property portfolio. He was a key organiser of a 2005 project to promote cricket in South Auckland, focussing in particular on Māori and Pacific Islander communities.

Walmsley's daughter, Amelia, plays top-level netball in the ANZ Premiership for Central Pulse. In September 2023 she made her international debut for the New Zealand national netball team against England in the 2023 Taini Jamison Trophy Series.
