= List of international cricket five-wicket hauls by Muttiah Muralitharan =

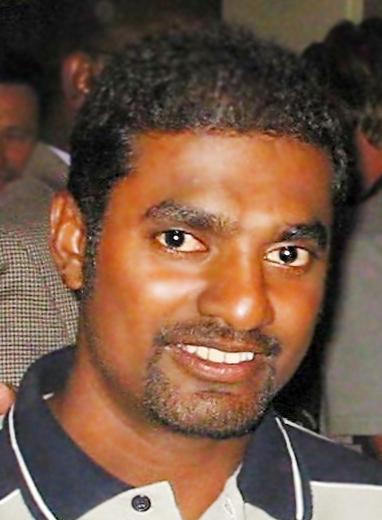
Muttiah Muralitharan has captured the highest number of five-wicket hauls in Test cricket.

In cricket, a five-wicket haul—also known as a five–for or fifer—refers to a bowler taking five or more wickets in a single innings. This is regarded as a notable achievement; only eleven bowlers have taken more than 30 five-wicket hauls in their Test cricketing careers. Sri Lankan cricketer Muttiah Muralitharan has the most five-wicket hauls in Test cricket, and also the second-highest number of five-wicket hauls in One Day Internationals (ODI). He did not take any five-wicket hauls in a Twenty20 International, where his best bowling figures were 3 wickets for 29 runs. One of the most experienced bowlers in international cricket, Muralitharan is the leading wicket taker in both Tests and ODIs. He was declared as the "best bowler ever" in Test cricket by the Wisden Cricketers' Almanack in 2002, and the Sri Lankan team depended heavily on the off spinner for wickets.

Muralitharan is well ahead of other bowlers by number of five-wicket hauls in Tests with 67 to his name; Australian cricketer Shane Warne ranks in second place with 37. Making his Test debut in 1992, Muralitharan took his first five-wicket haul a year later against South Africa. He performed this feat against every other Test playing nation. He went on to take ten or more wickets per match on 22 occasions—also a world record—while Shane Warne ranks second, having achieved this on 10 occasions. His career best is 9 wickets for 51 runs against Zimbabwe, which ranks as the world's fifth-best figures in an innings. He was most successful against Bangladesh and South Africa, with 11 five-wicket hauls against each team. Fourteen of Muralitharan's five-wicket hauls were taken at the Sinhalese Sports Club Ground (SSC) in Colombo, Sri Lanka. He retired from Test cricket in July 2010, capturing his 67th and final five-wicket haul during his last match.

In ODIs, Muralitharan is ranked second in number of five-wicket hauls to Pakistani cricketer Waqar Younis. He played his first ODI in 1993, and took his first ODI five-wicket haul in 1998 against Pakistan. He repeated this performance against seven different opponents. His career best of 7 wickets for 30 runs is the fourth-best bowling figures in ODI history.

== Key ==
Symbol	Meaning
Date	Day the Test started or ODI held
Inn	Innings in which five-wicket haul was taken
Overs	Number of overs bowled
Runs	Number of runs conceded
Wkts	Number of wickets taken
Econ	Runs conceded per over
Batsmen	Batsmen whose wickets were taken
Result	Result for the Sri Lanka team
*	One of two five-wicket hauls by Muralitharan in a match
†	10 or more wickets taken in the match
‡	Muralitharan was selected as man of the match

== Tests ==
Five-wicket hauls in Test cricket by Muttiah Muralitharan
No.	Date	Ground	Against	Inn	Overs	Runs	Wkts	Econ	Batsmen	Result
1	25 August 1993	Tyronne Fernando Stadium, Moratuwa	South Africa	2	39	104	5	2.66	Kepler Wessels; Hansie Cronje; Jonty Rhodes; Pat Symcox; Clive Eksteen	Drawn
2	6 September 1993	Sinhalese Sports Club Ground, Colombo	South Africa	2	54	101	5	1.87	Kepler Wessels; Daryll Cullinan; Brian McMillan; Dave Richardson; Brett Schultz	Lost
3	18 January 1994	K.D. Singh Babu Stadium, Lucknow	India	1	41.5	162	5	3.87	Navjot Singh Sidhu; Sanjay Manjrekar; Kapil Dev; Nayan Mongia; Rajesh Chauhan	Lost
4	11 March 1995	McLean Park, Napier	New Zealand	4	36	64	5	1.77	Bryan Young; Mark Greatbatch; Stephen Fleming; Shane Thomson; Adam Parore	Won
5	15 September 1995 ‡	Iqbal Stadium, Faisalabad	Pakistan	2	23.3	68	5	2.89	Saeed Anwar; Aamer Sohail; Saqlain Mushtaq; Moin Khan; Aaqib Javed	Won
6	11 September 1996	R. Premadasa Stadium, Colombo	Zimbabwe	3	20.3	33	5	1.60	Grant Flower; Alistair Campbell; Andy Flower; Paul Strang; Andrew Whittall	Won
7	19 April 1997	R. Premadasa Stadium, Colombo	Pakistan	2	53	98	6	1.84	Ijaz Ahmed; Inzamam-ul-Haq; Asif Mujtaba; Moin Khan; Mushtaq Ahmed; Shahid Nazir	Drawn
8	13 June 1997	Antigua Recreation Ground, St. John's	West Indies	2	23.4	34	5	1.43	Carl Hooper; Courtney Browne; Ian Bishop; Franklyn Rose; Courtney Walsh	Lost
9	20 June 1997	The Playing Fields, Kingstown	West Indies	3	41	113	5	2.75	Stuart Williams; Roland Holder; Ian Bishop; Courtney Browne; Courtney Walsh	Drawn
10	7 January 1998 * † ‡	Asgiriya Stadium, Kandy	Zimbabwe	2	29	23	5	0.79	Grant Flower; Craig Wishart; Paul Strang; Heath Streak; Bryan Strang	Won
11	7 January 1998 * † ‡	Asgiriya Stadium, Kandy	Zimbabwe	3	42.5	94	7	2.19	Gavin Rennie; Murray Goodwin; Andrew Whittall; Andy Flower; Craig Wishart; Paul Strang; Adam Huckle	Won
12	27 March 1998	Centurion Park, Centurion	South Africa	2	30	63	5	2.10	Gary Kirsten; Hansie Cronje; Shaun Pollock; Mark Boucher; Allan Donald	Lost
13	27 May 1998	R. Premadasa Stadium, Colombo	New Zealand	1	38.2	90	5	2.34	Brian Young; Craig McMillan; Chris Cairns; Daniel Vettori; Paul Wiseman	Lost
14	10 June 1998	Sinhalese Sports Club Ground, Colombo	New Zealand	4	18.3	30	5	1.62	Brian Young; Craig Spearman; Nathan Astle; Craig McMillan; Daniel Vettori	Won
15	27 August 1998 * † ‡	The Oval, Kennington	England	1	59.3	155	7	2.60	Steve James; Mark Ramprakash; Ben Hollioake; Dominic Cork; Ian Salisbury; Darren Gough; Angus Fraser	Won
16	27 August 1998 * † ‡	The Oval, Kennington	England	3	54.2	65	9	1.19	Mark Butcher; Steve James; Graeme Hick; Mark Ramprakash; John Crawley; Ben Hollioake; Dominic Cork; Ian Salisbury; Darren Gough	Won
17	22 September 1999	Galle International Stadium, Galle	Australia	2	38	71	5	1.86	Michael Slater; Greg Blewett; Justin Langer; Mark Waugh; Ian Healy	Drawn
18	5 March 2000 † ‡	Arbab Niaz Stadium, Peshawar	Pakistan	4	27.1	71	6	2.61	Shahid Afridi; Inzamam-ul-Haq; Mohammad Yousuf; Abdul Razzaq; Waqar Younis; Arshad Khan	Won
19	14 June 2000	Sinhalese Sports Club Ground, Colombo	Pakistan	2	47	115	5	2.44	Saeed Anwar; Younis Khan; Mohammad Yousuf; Waqar Younis; Mushtaq Ahmed	Lost
20	20 July 2000 * † ‡	Galle International Stadium, Galle	South Africa	2	41	87	6	2.12	Gary Kirsten; Neil McKenzie; Jacques Kallis; Jonty Rhodes; Mark Boucher; Shaun Pollock	Won
21	20 July 2000 * † ‡	Galle International Stadium, Galle	South Africa	3	35	84	7	2.40	Daryll Cullinan; Lance Klusener; Mark Boucher; Shaun Pollock; Nicky Boje; Paul Adams; Makhaya Ntini	Won
22	6 August 2000 ‡	Sinhalese Sports Club Ground, Colombo	South Africa	3	45.5	68	5	1.48	Gary Kirsten; Daryll Cullinan; Jonty Rhodes; Lance Klusener; Mark Boucher	Drawn
23	26 December 2000 * †	Sahara Stadium Kingsmead, Durban	South Africa	1	58.3	122	5	2.08	Daryll Cullinan; Neil McKenzie; Mark Boucher; Lance Klusener; Nicky Boje	Drawn
24	26 December 2000 * †	Sahara Stadium Kingsmead, Durban	South Africa	3	10	39	6	3.90	Boeta Dippenaar; Gary Kirsten; Jacques Kallis; Shaun Pollock; Mark Boucher; Neil McKenzie	Drawn
25	14 August 2001	Galle International Stadium, Galle	India	3	26.5	49	5	1.82	Mohammad Kaif; Hemang Badani; Sameer Dighe; Harbhajan Singh; Venkatesh Prasad	Won
26	29 August 2001 † ‡	Sinhalese Sports Club Ground, Colombo	India	1	34.1	87	8	2.54	Shiv Sunder Das; Sadagoppan Ramesh; Rahul Dravid; Sourav Ganguly; Hemang Badani; Sameer Dighe; Sairaj Bahutule; Zaheer Khan	Won
27	6 September 2001 * † ‡	Sinhalese Sports Club Ground, Colombo	Bangladesh	1	9.4	13	5	1.34	Al Sahariar; Naimur Rahman; Mohammad Ashraful; Khaled Mashud; Hasibul Hossain	Won
28	6 September 2001 * † ‡	Sinhalese Sports Club Ground, Colombo	Bangladesh	3	35.3	98	5	2.76	Javed Omar; Mehrab Hossain; Habibul Bashar; Khaled Mashud; Mohammad Sharif	Won
29	13 November 2001 * † ‡	Galle International Stadium, Galle	West Indies	1	53.4	126	6	2.34	Ramnaresh Sarwan; Brian Lara; Carl Hooper; Marlon Samuels; Neil McGarrell; Colin Stuart	Won
30	13 November 2001 * † ‡	Galle International Stadium, Galle	West Indies	3	31.3	44	5	1.39	Ramnaresh Sarwan; Marlon Samuels; Ridley Jacobs; Mervyn Dillon; Colin Stuart	Won
31	21 November 2001 † ‡	Asgiriya Stadium, Kandy	West Indies	4	35.5	81	6	2.26	Daren Ganga; Ramnaresh Sarwan; Marlon Samuels; Mervyn Dillon; Pedro Collins; Colin Stuart	Won
32	4 January 2002 † ‡	Asgiriya Stadium, Kandy	Zimbabwe	1	40	51	9	1.27	Hamilton Masakadza; Trevor Gripper; Stuart Carlisle; Gavin Rennie; Andy Flower; Grant Flower; Craig Wishart; Heath Streak; Dougie Marillier	Won
33	12 January 2002	Galle International Stadium, Galle	Zimbabwe	2	58.3	67	5	1.14	Stuart Carlisle; Andy Flower; Grant Flower; Travis Friend; Henry Olonga	Won
34	30 May 2002	Edgbaston Cricket Ground, Birmingham	England	2	64	143	5	2.23	Michael Vaughan; Mark Butcher; Nasser Hussain; Alec Stewart; Andrew Flintoff	Lost
35	21 July 2002 * † ‡	Paikiasothy Saravanamuttu Stadium, Colombo	Bangladesh	1	19.4	39	5	1.98	Habibul Bashar; Aminul Islam; Khaled Mashud; Enamul Haque; Alamgir Kabir	Won
36	21 July 2002 * † ‡	Paikiasothy Saravanamuttu Stadium, Colombo	Bangladesh	3	25	59	5	2.36	Al Sahariar; Habibul Bashar; Akram Khan; Aminul Islam; Manjural Islam Rana	Won
37	3 May 2003	Asgiriya Stadium, Kandy	New Zealand	3	39	49	5	1.25	Matt Horne; Mathew Sinclair; Jacob Oram; Daniel Vettori; Daryl Tuffey	Drawn
38	20 June 2003	Beausejour Stadium, Gros Islet	West Indies	2	50	138	5	2.76	Chris Gayle; Ramnaresh Sarwan; Marlon Samuels; Ridley Jacobs; Corey Collymore	Drawn
39	2 December 2003 † ‡	Galle International Stadium, Galle	England	2	31.4	46	7	1.45	Marcus Trescothick; Michael Vaughan; Paul Collingwood; Andrew Flintoff; Chris Read; Ashley Giles; Richard Johnson	Drawn
40	8 March 2004 * †	Galle International Stadium, Galle	Australia	1	21.3	59	6	2.74	Matthew Hayden; Darren Lehmann; Andrew Symonds; Adam Gilchrist; Michael Kasprowicz; Stuart MacGill	Lost
41	8 March 2004 * †	Galle International Stadium, Galle	Australia	3	56	153	5	2.73	Matthew Hayden; Damien Martyn; Darren Lehmann; Andrew Symonds; Shane Warne	Lost
42	16 March 2004	Asgiriya Stadium, Kandy	Australia	3	50.3	173	5	3.42	Adam Gilchrist; Damien Martyn; Andrew Symonds; Shane Warne; Jason Gillespie	Lost
43	24 March 2004	Sinhalese Sports Club Ground, Colombo	Australia	1	37.1	123	5	3.30	Darren Lehmann; Simon Katich; Adam Gilchrist; Shane Warne; Jason Gillespie	Lost
44	6 May 2004	Harare Sports Club, Harare	Zimbabwe	1	24.2	45	6	1.84	Tatenda Taibu; Alester Maregwede; Mluleki Nkala; Prosper Utseya; Blessing Mahwire; Douglas Hondo	Won
45	13 July 2005	Sinhalese Sports Club Ground, Colombo	West Indies	3	21	36	6	1.71	Sylvester Joseph; Denesh Ramdin; Omari Banks; Daren Powell; Tino Best; Jermaine Lawson	Won
46	22 July 2005 †	Asgiriya Stadium, Kandy	West Indies	4	16.2	46	8	2.81	Ryan Ramdass; Runako Morton; Sylvester Joseph; Narsingh Deonarine; Denesh Ramdin; Omari Banks; Daren Powell; Tino Best	Won
47	12 September 2005 ‡	R. Premadasa Stadium, Colombo	Bangladesh	3	10.4	18	6	1.68	Shahriar Nafees; Mohammad Ashraful; Tushar Imran; Aftab Ahmed; Mohammad Rafique; Enamul Haque Jr	Won
48	10 December 2005	Feroz Shah Kotla, Delhi	India	1	38.4	100	7	2.58	Rahul Dravid; VVS Laxman; Sachin Tendulkar; Sourav Ganguly; MS Dhoni; Irfan Pathan; Harbhajan Singh	Lost
49	28 February 2006	Chittagong Divisional Stadium, Chittagong	Bangladesh	3	19.5	54	6	2.72	Shahriar Nafees; Mohammad Ashraful; Khaled Mashud; Alok Kapali; Mohammad Rafique; Enamul Haque Jr	Won
50	8 March 2006	Shaheed Chandu Stadium, Bogra	Bangladesh	1	30.5	79	5	2.56	Javed Omar; Nafees Iqbal; Habibul Bashar; Mushfiqur Rahim; Syed Rasel	Won
51	3 April 2006	Asgiriya Stadium, Kandy	Pakistan	2	16.4	39	5	2.34	Kamran Akmal; Mohammad Yousuf; Faisal Iqbal; Abdul Razzaq; Danish Kaneria	Lost
52	25 May 2006 †	Edgbaston Cricket Ground, Birmingham	England	2	25	86	6	3.44	Marcus Trescothick; Alastair Cook; Kevin Pietersen; Paul Collingwood; Geraint Jones; Liam Plunkett	Lost
53	2 June 2006 † ‡	Trent Bridge, Nottingham	England	4	30	70	8	2.33	Marcus Trescothick; Andrew Strauss; Alastair Cook; Kevin Pietersen; Paul Collingwood; Andrew Flintoff; Geraint Jones; Jon Lewis	Won
54	27 July 2006 †	Sinhalese Sports Club Ground, Colombo	South Africa	3	64	131	6	2.04	Andrew Hall; Ashwell Prince; AB de Villiers; Herschelle Gibbs; André Nel; Dale Steyn	Won
55	4 August 2006 * †	Paikiasothy Saravanamuttu Stadium, Colombo	South Africa	1	33.5	128	5	3.78	Hashim Amla; Ashwell Prince; Mark Boucher; Dale Steyn; Makhaya Ntini	Won
56	4 August 2006 * †	Paikiasothy Saravanamuttu Stadium, Colombo	South Africa	3	46.5	97	7	2.07	Herschelle Gibbs; Ashwell Prince; AB de Villiers; Mark Boucher; Shaun Pollock; Nicky Boje; Dale Steyn	Won
57	15 December 2006 †	Basin Reserve, Wellington	New Zealand	4	34.1	87	6	2.54	Craig Cumming; Mathew Sinclair; Nathan Astle; Brendon McCullum; Daniel Vettori; James Franklin	Won
58	25 June 2007 ‡	Sinhalese Sports Club Ground, Colombo	Bangladesh	1	7.3	15	5	2.00	Rajin Saleh; Shakib Al Hasan; Mashrafe Mortaza; Mohammad Rafique; Abdur Razzak	Won
59	11 July 2007 * † ‡	Asgiriya Stadium, Kandy	Bangladesh	1	14.5	28	6	1.88	Shahriar Nafees; Rajin Saleh; Mashrafe Mortaza; Mohammad Rafique; Shahadat Hossain; Syed Rasel	Won
60	11 July 2007 * † ‡	Asgiriya Stadium, Kandy	Bangladesh	3	21	54	6	2.57	Shahriar Nafees; Habibul Bashar; Mohammad Ashraful; Mashrafe Mortaza; Shahadat Hossain; Syed Rasel	Won
61	1 December 2007	Asgiriya Stadium, Kandy	England	2	35	55	6	1.57	Michael Vaughan; Ian Bell; Kevin Pietersen; Paul Collingwood; Ravi Bopara; Matthew Hoggard	Won
62	9 December 2007	Sinhalese Sports Club Ground, Colombo	England	1	47.2	116	5	2.45	Michael Vaughan; Ian Bell; Matthew Prior; Ryan Sidebottom; Steve Harmison	Drawn
63	3 April 2008	Queen's Park Oval, Port of Spain	West Indies	2	29.2	79	5	2.69	Ramnaresh Sarwan; Marlon Samuels; Devon Smith; Denesh Ramdin; Daren Powell	Lost
64	23 July 2008 * † ‡	Sinhalese Sports Club Ground, Colombo	India	2	29	84	5	2.89	Gautam Gambhir; Sachin Tendulkar; Sourav Ganguly; Dinesh Karthik; Harbhajan Singh	Won
65	23 July 2008 * † ‡	Sinhalese Sports Club Ground, Colombo	India	3	13	26	6	2.00	Gautam Gambhir; Virender Sehwag; Sachin Tendulkar; Sourav Ganguly; Dinesh Karthik; Anil Kumble	Won
66	26 December 2008 †	Sher-e-Bangla Stadium, Mirpur	Bangladesh	2	22	49	6	2.22	Tamim Iqbal; Junaid Siddique; Shakib Al Hasan; Mashrafe Mortaza; Shahadat Hossain; Mahbubul Alam	Won
67	18 July 2010	Galle International Stadium, Galle	India	2	17	63	5	3.70	Sachin Tendulkar; Yuvraj Singh; MS Dhoni; Pragyan Ojha; Abhimanyu Mithun	Won

== One Day Internationals ==
Five-wicket hauls in ODIs by Muttiah Muralitharan
No.	Date	Ground	Against	Inn	Overs	Runs	Wkts	Econ	Batsmen	Result
1	25 April 1998	Willowmoore Park, Benoni	Pakistan	2	9.2	23	5	2.46	Saeed Anwar; Azhar Mahmood; Wasim Akram; Rashid Latif; Waqar Younis	Won
2	20 August 1998 ‡	Lord's, London	England	1	10	34	5	3.40	Nick Knight; Mike Atherton; Alec Stewart; Ali Brown; Nasser Hussain	Won
3	14 July 2000 ‡	R. Premadasa Stadium, Colombo	South Africa	2	10	44	5	4.40	Gary Kirsten; Andrew Hall; Nicky Boje; Lance Klusener; Shaun Pollock	Won
4	27 October 2000 ‡	Sharjah Cricket Association Stadium, Sharjah	India	2	10	30	7	3.00	Sachin Tendulkar; Robin Singh; Vinod Kambli; Yuvraj Singh; Hemang Badani; Vijay Dahiya; Sunil Joshi	Won
5	31 January 2001 ‡	McLean Park, Napier	New Zealand	2	7.5	30	5	3.82	Roger Twose; Adam Parore; Daniel Vettori; Andrew Penn; Chris Martin	Won
6	9 April 2002	Sharjah Cricket Association Stadium, Sharjah	New Zealand	1	10	9	5	0.90	Chris Nevin; Stephen Fleming; Scott Styris; Chris Harris; Mathew Sinclair	Lost
7	18 May 2003 ‡	Rangiri Dambulla International Stadium, Dambulla	Pakistan	2	9.4	23	5	2.37	Mohammad Yousuf; Shoaib Malik; Abdul Razzaq; Shoaib Akhtar; Shabbir Ahmed	Won
8	29 April 2004	Harare Sports Club, Harare	Zimbabwe	2	10	23	5	2.30	Stuart Matsikenyeri; Tatenda Taibu; Elton Chigumbura; Prosper Utseya; Douglas Hondo	Won
9	30 June 2008	National Stadium, Karachi	Bangladesh	2	10	31	5	3.10	Raqibul Hasan; Mushfiqur Rahim; Alok Kapali; Abdur Razzak; Mashrafe Mortaza	Won
10	30 November 2008 ‡	Harare Sports Club, Harare	Zimbabwe	2	10	29	5	2.90	Vusi Sibanda; Chamu Chibhabha; Stuart Matsikenyeri; Elton Chigumbura; Ray Price	Won
