= Robbie Hart (cricketer) =

New Zealand cricketer (born 1974)

Personal information
- Full name: Robert Garry Hart
- Born: 2 December 1974 (age 51); Hamilton, New Zealand
- Batting: Right-handed
- Role: Wicket-keeper

International information
- National side: New Zealand (2002–2003)
- Test debut (cap 220): 1 May 2002 v Pakistan
- Last Test: 26 December 2003 v Pakistan
- ODI debut (cap 128): 21 April 2002 v Pakistan
- Last ODI: 24 April 2002 v Pakistan

Career statistics
Competition	Test	ODI	FC	LA
Matches	11	2	110	135
Runs scored	260	0	2,893	1,210
Batting average	16.25	0.00	21.91	16.35
100s/50s	0/1	0/0	2/12	0/2
Top score	57*	0	127*	56
Catches/stumpings	29/1	1/0	299/17	134/32
- Source: Cricinfo, 4 May 2017

Robert Garry Hart (born 2 December 1974) is a New Zealand cricketer. He was the first-choice Test wicket-keeper for the New Zealand national cricket team following the retirement of Adam Parore.

Hart played 11 Tests for his country and took 29 catches and one stumping before retiring in August 2004. He did not feature much at international level with the bat but scored a solitary fifty against the West Indies.

His brother, Matthew, also played cricket for Northern Districts Knights and New Zealand.

Hart is a member of the Sports Tribunal of New Zealand.
