= 3TC Solidarity Cup =

Cricket exhibition match in 2020

- Dates: 18 July 2020 – 18 July 2020
- Administrator: Cricket South Africa
- Cricket format: 3TeamCricket
- Host: South Africa
- Champions: Eagles (gold)
- Runners-up: Kites (silver)
- Participants: Eagles, Kingfishers, Kites
- Most runs: Aiden Markram (70)
- Most wickets: Lutho Sipamla, Anrich Nortje (2)

2020 3TC Solidarity Cup was a 36-over charity exhibition match featuring 3 teams of 8 players in an experimental format branded 3TeamCricket (3TC). It was contested by teams named Eagles, Kingfishers and Kites. The gold medal was awarded to the Eagles, the silver medal was awarded to the Kites, and the bronze medal was awarded to the Kingfishers.

The match was held at Centurion Super Sport Park behind closed doors on 18 July 2020, coinciding with the Nelson Mandela International Day, which is celebrated in honour of former South African President Nelson Mandela. The match marked the return of cricket in South Africa following months of restrictions due to the COVID-19 pandemic, and was also the first sporting event to be broadcast on television in the country post lockdown. The match had originally been scheduled for 27 June 2020 but was postponed due as Cricket South Africa could not obtain necessary approvals from the Ministry of Sports. Concerns had been raised over hosting the tournament in Centurion which was seen as a hotspot of infections.

The Solidarity Cup's served as a fundraiser for the people who were financially affected due to the coronavirus pandemic. A minute of silence was observed in remembrance of the victims of the pandemic. The match also acknowledged the global Black Lives Matter movement, with players wearing black armbands and taking a knee prior to the start. However the BLM logos were not printed in the jerseys of the players as they were reportedly prepared prior to the George Floyd protests. Graeme Smith, former South African cricket captain and director of Cricket South Africa, offered his support to the BLM movement and promised to take knee along with the players and coaching staff.

== Background ==
South Africa itself had long endured racism and apartheid. 31 South African cricketers and coaching staff signed a petition supporting BLM movement suggestion of cricketer Lungi Ngidi who offered and insisted fellow players to join his efforts in the stand against racism in a message on 6 July 2020. Ngidi insisted that South Africa must take BLM stand like rest of the world. It created a controversy among some of the South African white cricketers such as Boeta Dippenaar, Pat Symcox and Rudi Steyn criticised Ngidi in the Facebook blaming him for not addressing and showing equal solidarity in the fight against murdering of white farmers in the country. However South African Cricketers Association condemned the criticisms on Ngidi and stated the criticism levelled against Ngidi was unfair.

On 14 June 2020, around 30 players alleged that racial divide is still available in South African cricket which became a huge talking point prior to the start of the game.

== Format ==
The concept of 3TeamCricket was devised by Paul Harris, former CEO of FirstRand Bank, and launched as a joint-enterprise involving South African rugby union player Francois Pienaar and cricket commentator Mark Nicholas.

Matches are contested between three teams of eight players, with the team scoring the most runs declared the winner (gold medal). Each team has an innings of 12 overs, split into two halves, facing a different team with bat and ball in each half. Should the seventh wicket fall, the last batter continues alone. Bowlers are permitted a maximum of 3 overs.

== Squads ==
Eagles	Kingfishers	Kites
AB de Villiers (capt)	Reeza Hendricks (capt) (Note: Kagiso Rabada was originally named as captain of the Kingfishers but withdrew for family reasons. Heinrich Klaasen was initially named as his replacement before Cricket South Africa decided to appoint Hendricks in light of the stance being taken in support of the Black Lives Matter movement.)	Temba Bavuma (capt) (Note: Quinton de Kock was originally named as captain of the Kites but withdrew for personal reasons.)
Junior Dala	Gerald Coetzee	Beuran Hendricks
Bjorn Fortuin	Faf du Plessis	David Miller
Aiden Markram	Heinrich Klaasen	Anrich Nortje
Lungi Ngidi	Janneman Malan	Dwaine Pretorius
Andile Phehlukwayo	Thando Ntini	Ryan Rickelton
Rassie van der Dussen	Tabraiz Shamsi	Lutho Sipamla
Kyle Verreynne	Glenton Stuurman	JJ Smuts

Kagiso Rabada, Chris Morris and Sisanda Magala were originally due to play but withdrew for personal reasons, with Thando Ntini, Bjorn Fortuin and Gerald Coetzee named as replacements. A day prior to the match Quinton de Kock, who was set to lead Kites, also withdrew owing to personal reasons. He was replaced by wicket-keeper batsman Ryan Rickelton with Temba Bavuma taking over as captain.

== Scorecard ==
=== First half ===
Eagles 66/1 (6 overs)

Kingfishers 56/2 (6 overs)

Kites 58/1 (6 overs)

=== Second half (accumulated) ===
Gold medal target was set as 161 and silver medal target was set as 139.

Eagles 160/4 (12 overs)

- Aiden Markram 70 (33), AB de Villiers 61 (24), Anrich Nortje 2/27 (3 overs)

Kites 138/3 (12 overs)

- Dwaine Pretorius 50* (17)

Kingfishers 113/5 (12 overs)

- Janneman Malan 31 (16)

Eagles Batting
Player	Status	Runs	Balls	4s	6s	Strike rate
Aiden Markram	c Pretorius b Sipamla	70	33			212.12
Rassie van der Dussen	b Stuurman	8	6			133.33
AB de Villiers	c Hendricks b Nortje	61	24			254.17
Andile Phehlukwayo	b Sipamla	0	1			0.00
Kyle Verreynne	not out	9	5			180.00
Bjorn Fortuin	not out	8	3			266.67
Junior Dala	did not bat					
Lungi Ngidi	did not bat					
Extras	(lb 2, wd 2)	4				
Total	(4 wickets; 12 overs)	160				

Kingfishers Batting
Player	Status	Runs	Balls	4s	6s	Strike rate
Reeza Hendricks	run out (Bavuma)	20	16			125.00
Janneman Malan	c Miller b Nortje	31	16			193.75
Faf du Plessis	b Fortuin	28	12			233.33
Gerald Coetzee	not out	24	19			126.31
Heinrich Klaasen	b Phehlukwayo	8	5			160.00
Thando Ntini	c Dala b Ngidi	2	4			50.00
Glenton Stuurman	did not bat					
Tabraiz Shamsi	did not bat					
Extras		0				
Total	(5 wickets; 12 overs)	113				

Kites Batting
Player	Status	Runs	Balls	4s	6s	Strike rate
JJ Smuts	c du Plessis b T Ntini	48	26			184.61
Ryan Rickelton	lbw b Phehlukwayo	10	10			100.00
Temba Bavuma	c Hendricks b Stuurman	9	9			100.00
David Miller	not out	15	10			150.00
Dwaine Pretorius	not out	50	17			294.12
Lutho Sipamla	did not bat					
Beuran Hendricks	did not bat					
Anrich Nortje	did not bat					
Extras	(b3, lb 1, wd 2)	6				
Total	(3 wickets; 12 overs)	138				

Eagles Bowling
Bowler	Overs	Maidens	Runs	Wickets	Econ	Wides	NBs
Bjorn Fortuin	3	0	20	1	6.67	{{{wides}}}	{{{no-balls}}}
Lungi Ngidi	3	0	43	1	14.33	{{{wides}}}	{{{no-balls}}}
Andile Phehlukwayo	3	0	24	2	8.00	{{{wides}}}	{{{no-balls}}}
Junior Dala	2	0	18	0	9.00	{{{wides}}}	{{{no-balls}}}
Aiden Markram	1	0	7	0	7.00	{{{wides}}}	{{{no-balls}}}

Kingfishers Bowling
Bowler	Overs	Maidens	Runs	Wickets	Econ	Wides	NBs
Glenton Stuurman	3	0	26	2	8.67	{{{wides}}}	{{{no-balls}}}
Thando Ntini	3	0	34	1	11.33	{{{wides}}}	{{{no-balls}}}
Gerald Coetzee	2	0	22	0	11.00	{{{wides}}}	{{{no-balls}}}
Tabraiz Shamsi	3	0	56	0	18.67	{{{wides}}}	{{{no-balls}}}
Reeza Hendricks	1	0	7	0	7.00	{{{wides}}}	{{{no-balls}}}

Kites Bowling
Bowler	Overs	Maidens	Runs	Wickets	Econ	Wides	NBs
JJ Smuts	2	0	27	0	13.50	{{{wides}}}	{{{no-balls}}}
Anrich Nortje	3	0	27	2	9.00	{{{wides}}}	{{{no-balls}}}
Beuran Hendricks	2	0	26	0	13.00	{{{wides}}}	{{{no-balls}}}
Lutho Sipamla	3	0	45	2	15.00	{{{wides}}}	{{{no-balls}}}
Dwaine Pretorius	2	0	23	0	11.50	{{{wides}}}	{{{no-balls}}}
