= Rudi Steyn =

South African cricketer (born 1967)

Personal information
- Full name: Philippus Jeremia Rudolf Steyn
- Born: 30 June 1967 (age 59); Kimberley, South Africa
- Batting: Right-handed
- Bowling: Right-arm medium

International information
- National side: South Africa (1995)
- Test debut (cap 260): 2 January 1995 v New Zealand
- Last Test: 4 March 1995 v New Zealand
- Only ODI (cap 36): 22 October 1995 v Zimbabwe

Career statistics
Competition	Test	ODI	FC	LA
Matches	3	1	129	157
Runs scored	127	4	6,858	3,941
Batting average	21.16	4.00	31.17	30.78
100s/50s	0/0	0/0	11/30	5/22
Top score	46	4	188*	127*
Catches/stumpings	0/–	0/–	64/1	32/0
- Source: Cricinfo, 7 July 2021

Philippus Jeremia Rudolf Steyn (born 30 June 1967) is a former South African cricketer. He played in three Test matches and one One Day International in 1995. He went to school at Diamantveld High School in Kimberley. He also ran Sportweni Sport Academy, and coaches cricket skills to youngsters alongside fellow former international Corrie van Zyl.

== Career ==
He made his test debut on 2 January 1995 against New Zealand at Cape Town and opened the batting alongside Gary Kirsten. He added 106 runs with Kirsten for the opening wicket on his debut and scored 38 off 126 balls. His last test appearance was in the one-off test match against New Zealand in March 1995 at Eden Park where he registered his highest career test score with 46 off 193 balls in 220 minutes. He made his ODI debut on 22 October 1995 against Zimbabwe at Harare which was his only appearance in ODI cricket.

He was never recalled to the national team mainly due to his low batting strike rate and slow mode batting. His batting career strike rate stood at 26.85 after featuring in three tests. However, he continued to play in domestic cricket and he managed to work on improving his strike rate in his later career. He ended his domestic career scoring five List A centuries and 11 first-class centuries. He retired from all forms of cricket in 2002 after playing for Northerns in domestic cricket.

== Controversy ==
On 6 July 2020, South African cricketer Lungi Ngidi offered and insisted fellow players to join his efforts in the stand against racism in a message prior to the start of the 3TC Solidarity Cup. Ngidi insisted that South Africa must take BLM stand like rest of the world. However, Steyn along with few South African white cricketers such as Boeta Dippenaar and Pat Symcox criticised Ngidi in the Facebook blaming him for not addressing and showing equal solidarity in the fight against murdering of white farmers in the country.
