= Mark Priest =

New Zealand cricketer (born 1961)

Personal information
- Full name: Mark Wellings Priest
- Born: 12 August 1961 (age 65)
- Batting: Left-handed
- Bowling: Slow left-arm orthodox
- Role: Bowler

International information
- National side: New Zealand (1990–1998)
- Test debut (cap 170): 7 June 1990 v England
- Last Test: 10 June 1998 v Sri Lanka
- ODI debut (cap 68): 26 April 1990 v Australia
- Last ODI: 23 June 1998 v India

Domestic team information
- Years: Team
- 1984/85–1998/99: Canterbury

Career statistics
Competition	Test	ODI	FC	LA
Matches	3	18	109	115
Runs scored	56	103	3,945	832
Batting average	14.00	10.30	30.58	14.10
100s/50s	0/0	0/0	4/28	0/1
Top score	26	24	119	98*
Balls bowled	377	752	25,632	5,473
Wickets	3	8	329	120
Bowling average	52.66	73.75	31.84	29.14
5 wickets in innings	0	0	12	1
10 wickets in match	0	0	3	0
Best bowling	2/42	2/27	9/95	5/26
Catches/stumpings	0/–	2/–	66/–	38/-
- Source: Cricinfo, 1 May 2017

Mark Wellings Priest (born 12 August 1961) is a former New Zealand international cricketer who played in three Test matches and 18 One Day Internationals (ODIs) between 1990 and 1998. He was the leading wicket-taker for Canterbury, with 290 dismissals, until Todd Astle went past his total in February 2019.

Priest was born at Greymouth, West Coast.

== Personal life and family ==
His nephew, Henry Shipley, has also played cricket for Canterbury and New Zealand.
