= Pakistani cricket team in New Zealand in 2003–04 =

The Pakistan national cricket team toured New Zealand in December to January 2003–04 and played a two-match Test series against the New Zealand national cricket team. Pakistan won the series 1–0. New Zealand were captained by Stephen Fleming and Pakistan by Inzamam-ul-Haq. In addition, the teams played a five-match series of Limited Overs Internationals (LOI) which New Zealand won 4–1.

== Test series summary ==
=== 1st Test ===
19–23 December 2003
(5-day match)
Scorecard

New Zealand	v	Pakistan
563 (151.2 overs); SP Fleming 192 (332); Shabbir Ahmed 5/117 (43.2 overs)		463 (144.4 overs); Moin Khan 137 (174); DR Tuffey 5/87 (33 overs)
96/8 (41.1 overs); JDP Oram 23* (70); Mohammad Sami 5/44 (16 overs)

Match drawn
Westpac Park, Hamilton
Umpires: SJ Davis (AUS) and DL Orchard (SA)
Player of the match: SP Fleming (NZ)

- Pakistan won the toss and elected to field.

=== 2nd Test ===
26–30 December 2003
(5-day match)
Scorecard

New Zealand	v	Pakistan
366 (142.3 overs); JDP Oram 97 (158); Shoaib Akhtar 5/48 (20.3 overs)		196 (90 overs); Mohammad Yousuf 60 (182); IG Butler 6/46 (20 overs)
103 (53 overs); MH Richardson 41 (132); Shoaib Akhtar 6/30 (18 overs)		277/3 (74.5 overs); Mohammad Yousuf 88* (144); JDP Oram 1/34 (9 overs)

Pakistan won by 7 wickets
Basin Reserve, Wellington
Umpires: EAR de Silva (SL) and DL Orchard (SA)
Player of the match: Shoaib Akhtar (PAK)

- New Zealand won the toss and elected to bat.
- RA Jones (NZ) made his Test debut.

== One Day Internationals (ODIs) ==
=== 1st ODI ===
3 January 2004
Scorecard

Pakistan; 229/7 (50 overs)	v	New Zealand; 230/6 (49.1 overs)
Moin Khan 72* (68); SB Styris 3/34 (10 overs)		SB Styris 101* (108); Shoaib Malik 2/28 (10 overs)

New Zealand won by 4 wickets
Eden Park, Auckland
Umpires: DB Cowie (NZ) and EAR de Silva (SL)
Player of the match: SB Styris (NZ)

- New Zealand won the toss and elected to field.

=== 2nd ODI ===
7 January 2004
Scorecard

New Zealand; 235/8 (50 overs)	v	Pakistan; 236/4 (47 overs)
BB McCullum 56* (51); Mohammad Sami 3/52 (10 overs)		Mohammad Yousuf 88* (106); DR Tuffey 1/28 (10 overs)

Pakistan won by 6 wickets
Queenstown Events Centre, Queenstown
Umpires: EAR de Silva (SL) and AL Hill (NZ)
Player of the match: Mohammad Yousuf (PAK)

- Pakistan won the toss and elected to field.

=== 3rd ODI ===
10 January 2004
Scorecard

Pakistan; 255/9 (50 overs)	v	New Zealand; 259/3 (46.2 overs)
Saleem Elahi 80 (103); SB Styris 2/14 (3 overs)		SP Fleming 115* (135); Shoaib Malik 1/40 (8 overs)

New Zealand won by 7 wickets
Jade Stadium, Christchurch
Umpires: BF Bowden (NZ) and DB Hair (AUS)
Player of the match: SP Fleming (NZ)

- New Zealand won the toss and elected to field.

=== 4th ODI ===
14 January 2004
Scorecard

Pakistan; 126 (36.3 overs)	v	New Zealand; 127/2 (22.5 overs)
Shoaib Akhtar 27* (28); DR Tuffey 3/35 (10 overs)		CD Cumming 45* (71); Shoaib Malik 1/19 (4.5 overs)

New Zealand won by 8 wickets
McLean Park, Napier
Umpires: BF Bowden (NZ) and DB Hair (AUS)
Player of the match: JDP Oram (NZ)

- New Zealand won the toss and elected to field.

=== 5th ODI ===
17 January 2004 (D/N)
Scorecard

New Zealand; 307/8 (50 overs)	v	Pakistan; 303 (49.3 overs)
HJH Marshall 84 (104); Azhar Mahmood 2/38 (6 overs)		Abdul Razzaq 89 (40); JDP Oram 2/28 (10 overs)

New Zealand won by 4 runs
Westpac Stadium, Wellington
Umpires: BF Bowden (NZ) and DB Hair (AUS)
Player of the match: Abdul Razzaq (PAK)

- New Zealand won the toss and elected to bat.
