= Michael Owens (cricketer) =

New Zealand cricketer (born 1969)

Personal information
- Full name: Michael Barry Owens
- Born: 11 November 1969; Christchurch, New Zealand
- Batting: Right-handed
- Bowling: Right-arm fast-medium

International information
- National side: New Zealand (1992–1994)
- Test debut (cap 182): 27 November 1992 v Sri Lanka
- Last Test: 30 June 1994 v England
- Only ODI (cap 84): 13 December 1992 v Sri Lanka

Career statistics
Competition	Test	ODI	FC	LA
Matches	8	1	34	55
Runs scored	16	0	133	71
Batting average	2.66	0.00	6.65	10.14
100s/50s	0/0	0/0	0/0	0/0
Top score	8*	0	18*	16*
Balls bowled	1,074	48	4,827	2,665
Wickets	17	0	86	70
Bowling average	34.41	–	27.37	24.74
5 wickets in innings	0	–	1	0
10 wickets in match	0	–	0	0
Best bowling	4/99	–	5/74	4/26
Catches/stumpings	3/–	0/–	11/–	14/–
- Source: Cricinfo, 4 May 2017

Michael Barry Owens (born 11 November 1969) is a former New Zealand international cricketer. He played eight Test matches and one One Day International for New Zealand from 1992 to 1994.

He was born in Christchurch.
