= Steven Jack =

South African cricketer (born 1970)

Cricket information
- Batting: Right-handed
- Bowling: Right-arm fast

Career statistics
Competition	Test	ODI
Matches	2	2
Runs scored	7	7
Batting average	3.50	3.50
100s/50s	0/0	0/0
Top score	7	6
Balls bowled	462	108
Wickets	8	3
Bowling average	24.50	28.66
5 wickets in innings	0	0
10 wickets in match	0	0
Best bowling	4/69	2/41
Catches/stumpings	1/–	3/–
- Source: Cricinfo, 25 January 2006

Steven Douglas Jack (born 4 August 1970) is a former South African cricketer who played in two Test matches and two One Day Internationals. He was a fast, aggressive bowler and formed a formidable opening partnership with Richard Snell for Transvaal in the early 1990s, as they tried to recapture the glory of the 'Mean Machine' years. He made his Test debut against New Zealand during the 1994–95 season, taking five wickets in the third Test. He was unfortunate to have his career coincide with that of Allan Donald, and it was then cut short due to injury. His first-class career spanned seven seasons in which he took 223 wickets with a best of 8 for 51 against Eastern Province. In his two One Day Internationals during the Mandela Trophy in 1995 he took three wickets. He attended Glenwood High School in Durban.
