= Fanie de Villiers =

South African cricketer

Personal information
- Full name: Petrus Stephanus de Villiers
- Born: 13 October 1964 (age 62); Vereeniging, Transvaal Province, South Africa
- Nickname: Fanie
- Height: 6 ft 2 in (1.88 m)
- Batting: Right-handed
- Bowling: Right arm fast-medium

International information
- National side: South Africa
- Test debut (cap 256): 26 December 1993 v Australia
- Last Test: 10 March 1998 v Pakistan
- ODI debut (cap 23): 7 December 1992 v India
- Last ODI: 8 November 1997 v Sri Lanka

Domestic team information
- Years: Team
- 1985/86–1997/98: Northern Transvaal
- 1990: Kent

Career statistics
| Competition | Test | ODI | FC | LA |
|---|---|---|---|---|
| Matches | 18 | 83 | 102 | 173 |
| Runs scored | 359 | 170 | 1,687 | 519 |
| Batting average | 18.89 | 8.09 | 17.04 | 9.26 |
| 100s/50s | 0/2 | 0/0 | 0/4 | 0/0 |
| Top score | 67* | 20* | 68 | 23* |
| Balls bowled | 4,805 | 4,422 | 20,498 | 8,765 |
| Wickets | 85 | 95 | 427 | 204 |
| Bowling average | 24.27 | 27.74 | 22.37 | 26.82 |
| 5 wickets in innings | 5 | 0 | 23 | 1 |
| 10 wickets in match | 2 | 0 | 3 | 0 |
| Best bowling | 6/23 | 4/27 | 7/80 | 5/30 |
| Catches/stumpings | 11/– | 15/– | 53/– | 24/– |
- Source: Cricinfo, 22 December 2008

Petrus Stephanus "Fanie" de Villiers (born 13 October 1964), is a retired cricketer who played 18 Test matches and 83 One Day Internationals for South Africa as a right arm fast-medium bowler and right hand batsman between 1992 and 1998.

He is currently working as an international cricket commentator. During the 3rd test match between Australia and South Africa in March 2018, he played a role in identifying the cheating carried out by the Australian cricket team after they tampered with the ball to get reverse swing during the 4th day of the third test match: he had served as one of the commentators for the match and had suggested to the camera operators that they look out for possible cheating.

== Career ==
De Villiers debuted in first-class cricket in 1985–86 for Northern Transvaal B. He opened the bowling in both innings, taking 5 for 33 in the second. He also played a season for English county team Kent in 1990.

In 1993–94, at the age of 29, he was called up for the Test tour of Australia. He was selected for the first Test in Melbourne but it was at the second Test in Sydney where De Villiers established himself at Test level. With Australia needing just 117 runs to win, De Villiers took 6 for 43, including the final wicket – a return catch from Glenn McGrath – to lead South Africa to a five run victory. De Villiers' match figures of 10 for 123 saw him named Man of the Match.

Former England captain Tony Greig had said at the start of the final innings that South Africa's chances were 100–1. At the Man of the Match presentation, De Villiers reminded him of his statement, adding, "You know South Africans; we never give up."

De Villiers showed further courage in the third Test in Adelaide when, despite not being able to bowl in Australia's second innings, he batted for 198 minutes as a nightwatchman, scoring 30 in South Africa's loss.

On this tour, De Villiers, when acting as twelfth man, would use a remote control car to send drinks to the batsmen on the field.

Against England at The Oval in 1994, De Villiers bowled a bouncer to English fast bowler Devon Malcolm hitting him on the front of the helmet and knocking him to the ground. Upon regaining his feet, Malcolm is reported to have said to the nearby South African fieldsmen, "You guys are history". Malcolm took 9 for 57 in South Africa's second innings, the sixth best bowling figures in Test history to that time, and England went on to win by 8 wickets.

1994–95 was an outstanding season for De Villiers. In five Tests, he took 36 wickets averaging 17.47. In the Test against Pakistan in Johannesburg, De Villiers became the first ever South African to score a fifty and take ten wickets in the same Test, scoring 66 not out and taking 6 for 81 and 4 for 27. He was subsequently named the South African Cricket Annual Cricketer of the Year in 1995, an award he had previously won in 1989.

A popular player, De Villiers was known by the nickname Vinnige Fanie (Fast Fanie) by his Afrikaans-speaking fans.

== Biography ==
De Villiers attended school at the Heidelberg Volkskool and matriculated in 1982. While there, he represented South African Schools as a javelin thrower.

== After cricketing career ==
Since his retirement, De Villiers has worked as a television commentator in South Africa and also works as a corporate speaker. He was a judge in the 1995 Miss World pageant in Sun City. De Villiers has become involved in raising money for deaf charities as he has both a brother and a daughter who are deaf. He raised R800 000 cycling from Cape Town to Pretoria and R189 000 sitting at the top of a floodlight tower at a Test match in Centurion.

=== De Villiers' role in identifying ball tampering scandal ===
During the third test match of a four-match series between South Africa and Australia in 2018, De Villiers, who served as one of the commentators for the match, helped to expose that Australian cricketers were tampering with the ball to get good reverse swing on the very early morning of day four of the test. De Villiers was able to detect the cheating after asking the TV camera operators to keep an eye on the Australian cricket team throughout the innings, and hinted that Australian cricketers used underhanded tactics.

In 2003, Trevor Chesterfield published a biography of De Villiers entitled Fanie De Villiers: Portrait of a Test Bowler.
