= Dave Richardson (South African cricketer) =

South African cricketer

Chief Executive Officer International Cricket Council
- In office 28 June 2012 – 1 April 2019
- President: Shashank Manohar
- Preceded by: Haroon Lorgat
- Succeeded by: Manu Sawhney

Davy Richardson
Personal information
- Full name: David John Richardson
- Born: 16 September 1959 (age 67); Johannesburg, Transvaal Province, Union of South Africa
- Batting: Right-handed
- Bowling: None
- Role: Wicket-keeper, batsman
- Relatives: John Richardson (father); Ralph Richardson (brother); Michael Richardson (son)

Domestic team information
- Years: Team
- 1977/78–1982/83: Eastern Province
- 1983/84: Northern Transvaal
- 1984/85–1997/98: Eastern Province

Career statistics
Competition	Test	ODI	FC	LA
Matches	42	122	200	158
Runs scored	1,359	868	6,981	2,545
Batting average	24.26	19.72	26.95	25.19
100s/50s	1/8	0/1	6/37	0/13
Top score	109	53	134	94
Catches/stumpings	150/2	148/17	579/40	167/12
- Source: ESPNcricinfo, 2 March 2014

David John Richardson (born 16 September 1959) is a South African former cricketer and the former CEO of the International Cricket Council.

== Playing career ==
Richardson played 42 Test matches and 122 One Day Internationals as a wicket-keeper for South Africa, and represented Eastern Province and Northern Transvaal in various domestic competitions.

Richardson succeeded Ray Jennings as South Africa's number one 'keeper in 1986 for their Unofficial "Test" matches. For the first seven years after South Africa returned from isolation, Richardson was a permanent fixture as wicket-keeper, his trademark sun hat and brown gloves were very recognisable. He was also a gritty batsman, scoring a maiden and his only Test century (109) against New Zealand at Cape Town in 1994–95.

== Administrative career ==
In January 2002, Richardson was appointed as the International Cricket Council's first general manager. In June 2012, Richardson was appointed as the new chief executive officer of the ICC. Using his influence he ensured that pitch preparation of neutral venues were in the ICC's hands.

Following the death of Australian Test cricketer Phillip Hughes in November 2014, Richardson said that any action on bowling bouncers in cricket matches would be "unlikely".

== Personal life ==
Richardson is a qualified lawyer and remained in cricket after retirement as a business agent for several players. His son, Michael, played county cricket in England for Durham.
