= Darrin Murray =

New Zealand cricketer (born 1967)

Personal information
- Full name: Darrin James Murray
- Born: 4 September 1967 (age 59); Christchurch, New Zealand
- Batting: Right-handed
- Bowling: Right-arm medium

International information
- National side: New Zealand (1994–1995)
- Test debut (cap 191): 25 November 1994 v South Africa
- Last Test: 18 March 1995 v Sri Lanka
- Only ODI (cap 91): 3 November 1994 v India

Domestic team information
- Years: Team
- 1990/91–1997/98: Canterbury

Career statistics
| Competition | Test | ODI | FC | LA |
|---|---|---|---|---|
| Matches | 8 | 1 | 53 | 51 |
| Runs scored | 303 | 3 | 2,907 | 1,108 |
| Batting average | 20.19 | 3.00 | 34.60 | 27.02 |
| 100s/50s | 0/1 | 0/0 | 1/13 | 1/4 |
| Top score | 52 | 3 | 182 | 116 |
| Balls bowled | – | – | 96 | 12 |
| Wickets | – | – | 0 | 0 |
| Bowling average | – | – | – | – |
| 5 wickets in innings | – | – | – | – |
| 10 wickets in match | – | – | – | – |
| Best bowling | – | – | – | – |
| Catches/stumpings | 6/– | 0/– | 36/– | 16/– |
- Source: Cricinfo, 4 May 2017

Darrin James Murray (born 4 September 1967) is a former New Zealand international cricketer. He played eight Test matches and one One Day International for New Zealand, all in the 1994/95 season.

Murray was born at Christchurch and played domestically for the Canterbury cricket team. After retirement he became an accountant.He currently lives in Netherlands

Murray’s daughter Josephine is currently a member of New Zealand’s National Hockey Team the Blackstick’s
