= Gavin Larsen =

New Zealand cricketer

Personal information
- Full name: Gavin Rolf Larsen
- Born: 27 September 1962 (age 64); Wellington, New Zealand
- Batting: Right-handed
- Bowling: Right-arm medium
- Role: Bowler

International information
- National side: New Zealand (1990–1999)
- Test debut (cap 190): 2 June 1994 v England
- Last Test: 27 April 1996 v West Indies
- ODI debut (cap 64): 1 March 1990 v India
- Last ODI: 16 June 1999 v Pakistan

Career statistics
Competition	Test	ODI	FC	LA
Matches	8	121	103	229
Runs scored	127	629	3,491	1,981
Batting average	14.11	14.62	28.61	18.17
100s/50s	0/0	0/0	2/17	0/2
Top score	26*	37	161	66
Balls bowled	1,967	6,368	12,765	12,061
Wickets	24	113	156	227
Bowling average	28.70	35.39	29.62	30.31
5 wickets in innings	0	0	5	1
10 wickets in match	0	0	0	0
Best bowling	3/57	4/24	6/37	5/30
Catches/stumpings	5/–	23/–	70/0	59/9
- Source: Cricinfo, 4 May 2017

Gavin Rolf Larsen (born 27 September 1962) is a former New Zealand international cricketer who specialised in the art of economical bowling. He was known playfully by his teammates as "The Postman". He is currently chief selector for the national side.

== Domestic career ==
Unusually for a New Zealand player, he played his entire first-class career with one team, Wellington. He also captained the side in the 1994 Australasian Cup in Sharjah in the United Arab Emirates, where New Zealand reached the semi-finals of a six-team tournament.

His nickname of "The Postman" came about as a compliment:

"John Graham, New Zealand's team manager during much of his career, explained the nickname in the foreword to Larsen's book Grand Larseny (yes, really): "He is the consummate professional, committed, conscientious, competitive and consistent. His nickname of 'The Postman' sums him up well, he always delivers!""

== International career ==
Larsen finished his career with an exceptional economy rate in ODI cricket of 3.76 – the norm at the time was usually somewhere between 4 and 4.50 – in his 121 ODIs, stretching over a ten-year span.

He also played eight Tests with reasonable success, taking 24 wickets. However, as a useful batsman and handy bowler, he held a place in the one-day side and played a major part in New Zealand reaching the semi-final stage of the 1999 Cricket World Cup.

Larsen earned his 100th ODI wicket in his home-town of Wellington, claiming the prize scalp of Indian batsman Sachin Tendulkar.

Larsen retired from international cricket in October 1999, aged 37. He was suffering from arthritis and had recurring injuries which forced to him to retire at that stage. He ended his career having played a total of 121 ODIs and eight Tests.

== After cricket ==
Larsen was formerly chief executive of Cricket Wellington, leaving the post in October 2011 after four years. He was appointed on 8 July 2015 as a selector of the New Zealand cricket team. Larsen quit as a selector in March 2023 and was appointed as performance director at Warwickshire. He held the role for two seasons until resigning in November 2024.
