= Dion Nash =

New Zealand cricketer (born 1971)

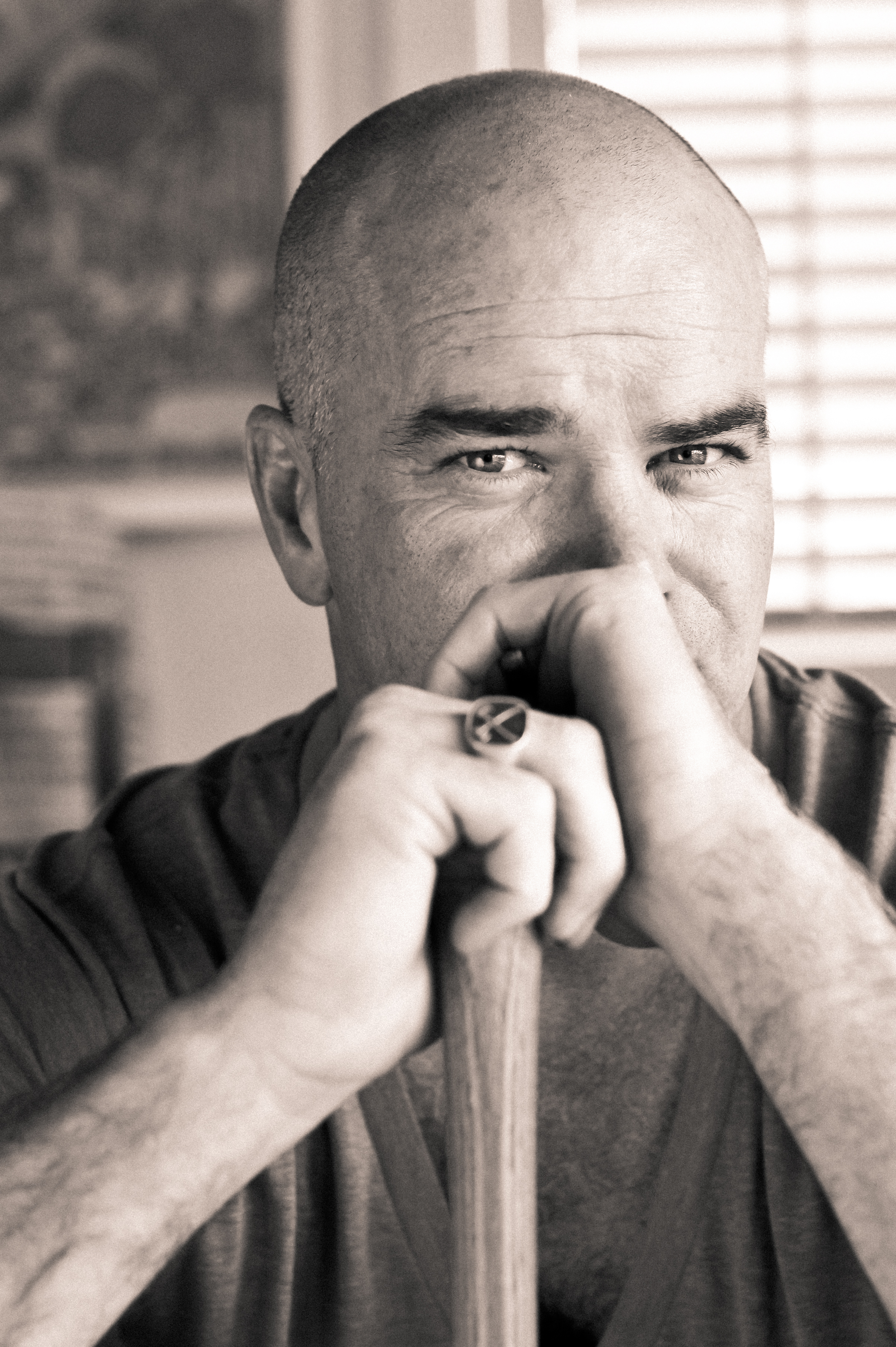
- Nash in 2013

Personal information
- Full name: Dion Joseph Nash
- Born: 20 November 1971 (age 54); Auckland, New Zealand
- Height: 1.86 m (6 ft 1 in)
- Batting: Right-handed
- Bowling: Right-arm fast-medium
- Role: All-rounder
- Relatives: Bernice Mene (wife); Sally Mene (mother-in-law); Chris Sua'mene (brother-in-law)

International information
- National side: New Zealand (1992–2002)
- Test debut (cap 180): 7 November 1992 v Zimbabwe
- Last Test: 8 November 2001 v Australia
- Only ODI (cap 79): 31 October 1992 v Zimbabwe

Domestic team information
- Years: Team
- 1990/91–1991/92: Northern Districts
- 1992/93–1993/94: Otago
- 1994/95–1997/98: Northern Districts
- 1995–1996: Middlesex
- 1998/99–2001/02: Auckland

Career statistics
Competition	Test	ODI	FC	LA
Matches	32	81	120	162
Runs scored	729	624	3,555	2,002
Batting average	23.51	15.59	27.13	20.85
100s/50s	0/4	0/0	5/16	0/6
Top score	89*	42	135*	88
Balls bowled	6,196	3,416	15,689	6,532
Wickets	93	64	255	143
Bowling average	28.48	40.96	28.09	32.74
5 wickets in innings	3	0	10	1
10 wickets in match	1	0	1	0
Best bowling	6/27	4/38	7/39	5/44
Catches/stumpings	13/–	25/–	46/–	50/–
Medal record
Representing New Zealand
Men's Cricket
Commonwealth Games
Bronze medal – third place	1998 Kuala Lumpur	List-A cricket
- Source: ESPNCricinfo, 1 May 2017

Dion Joseph Nash (born 20 November 1971) is a New Zealand entrepreneur and former international cricketer. He played for the New Zealand national cricket team, captaining the team in 1999 with the injury of regular captain Stephen Fleming. Nash was a right-arm fast medium bowler, taking 93 Test wickets in a career spanning from 1992 to 2001. He became the first player in history to take ten wickets and score 50 runs in a match at the Lord's ground in 1994. He was a member of the New Zealand team that won the 2000 ICC KnockOut Trophy.

== Suspension ==
On the 1995 tour to South Africa, Nash was suspended for smoking cannabis along with future captain Stephen Fleming and team-mate Matthew Hart.

== Beyond cricket ==
In June 2005, Nash was named as one of the national selectors. In 2008 he became a batsman/bowler for the official New Zealand Beach Cricket Team.

Nash also played Australian rules football in the Auckland Australian Football League, where he was a premiership player with the Mt Roskill Saints.

== Business career ==
After retiring from cricket, Nash was a salesman for spring water brand 420. He held a 25% stake in the business before Bacardi bought the parent vodka brand 42 Below. He then founded skincare brand Triumph & Disaster in 2011, exploiting a lack of moisturisers aimed at men.

== Personal life ==
Nash attended Dargaville High School before completing his final year of school as a boarder at Auckland Grammar.

In March 2003, he married Bernice Mene, a former New Zealand netball international. Together they have three children.

Sporting positions
Preceded by Stephen Fleming	New Zealand national cricket captain 1998/9	Succeeded by Stephen Fleming
