= Matthew Hart =

New Zealand cricketer (born 1972)

Personal information
- Full name: Matthew Norman Hart
- Born: 16 May 1972 (age 54); Hamilton, Waikato, New Zealand
- Batting: Left-handed
- Bowling: Slow left-arm orthodox

International information
- National side: New Zealand (1994–2002)
- Test debut (cap 187): 17 February 1994 v Pakistan
- Last Test: 8 November 1995 v India
- ODI debut (cap 87): 13 March 1994 v Pakistan
- Last ODI: 9 June 2002 v West Indies

Career statistics
Competition	Test	ODI	FC	LA
Matches	14	13	135	128
Runs scored	353	61	4,418	2,050
Batting average	17.64	7.62	25.53	20.91
100s/50s	0/0	0/0	4/20	1/13
Top score	45	16	201*	100
Balls bowled	3,086	572	16,417	4,965
Wickets	29	13	212	116
Bowling average	49.58	28.69	35.01	27.28
5 wickets in innings	1	1	7	1
10 wickets in match	0	0	0	0
Best bowling	5/77	5/22	6/73	5/22
Catches/stumpings	9/–	7/–	109/–	69/–
- Source: Cricinfo, 4 May 2017

Matthew Norman Hart (born 16 May 1972) is a former New Zealand cricketer. Hart, a left-arm orthodox spinner, played in 14 Tests between 1994 and 1996, claiming 29 wickets including one five-wicket haul against South Africa.

He also appeared in 13 ODIs, claiming 13 wickets, including a then-record haul by a New Zealander in One Day Internationals, claiming 5/22 against the West Indies in 1994. His international career lasted from 1994 to 2002, eventually losing his place in the team to Daniel Vettori. Hart retired from cricket in 2005 at the age of 33, citing a loss of enthusiasm for the game.

His brother, Robbie, also played cricket as a wicket-keeper for Northern Districts Knights and New Zealand.
