= Chris Pringle =

New Zealand cricketer

Personal information
- Born: 26 January 1968 (age 58); Auckland, New Zealand
- Batting: Right-handed
- Bowling: Right-arm fast-medium
- Relatives: Tim Pringle (son)

International information
- National side: New Zealand (1990–1995)
- Test debut (cap 173): 10 October 1990 v Pakistan
- Last Test: 18 March 1995 v Sri Lanka
- ODI debut (cap 69): 23 May 1990 v England
- Last ODI: 1 April 1995 v Sri Lanka

Domestic team information
- Years: Team
- 1989–1998: Auckland

Career statistics
| Competition | Test | ODI | FC | LA |
|---|---|---|---|---|
| Matches | 14 | 64 | 63 | 129 |
| Runs scored | 175 | 193 | 795 | 577 |
| Batting average | 10.29 | 8.77 | 12.82 | 10.30 |
| 100s/50s | 0/0 | 0/0 | 0/0 | 0/0 |
| Top score | 30 | 34* | 47* | 38* |
| Balls bowled | 2,985 | 3,314 | 12,252 | 6,612 |
| Wickets | 30 | 103 | 194 | 195 |
| Bowling average | 46.29 | 23.87 | 28.95 | 23.25 |
| 5 wickets in innings | 1 | 1 | 7 | 1 |
| 10 wickets in match | 1 | 0 | 2 | 0 |
| Best bowling | 7/52 | 5/45 | 7/52 | 5/45 |
| Catches/stumpings | 3/– | 7/– | 15/– | 17/– |
- Source: Cricinfo, 4 May 2017

Christopher Pringle (born 26 January 1968) is a New Zealand former cricketer. A medium-fast bowler, he played 14 Tests and 64 One Day Internationals (ODI) for New Zealand between 1990 and 1995. He represented Auckland in the State Championship between 1989 and 1998.

Pringle was in England in 1990 playing cricket in the Bradford Cricket League and had gone to watch an ODI at Headingley, Leeds between England and New Zealand. He asked if there was a spare ticket for the match, and when three other New Zealand bowlers were injured or unwell, he found himself playing in two matches.

== International career ==
Pringle made his Test debut versus Pakistan at Karachi in 1990/91 and in his third test took Test best figures of 11-152, including 7-52 in the first innings. The match and the series was dogged by controversy as both teams were accused of ball tampering. Pringle later admitted that he had used a bottle cap that he'd cut into four quarters to scrape one side of the ball. He appeared intermittently for the Test side, gaining more success in the one-day game. From his seemingly uncoordinated action he was good at bowling yorker length deliveries in the closing overs.

In a 1990 ODI at Hobart versus Australia, Pringle was due to bowl the 50th and final over of the innings with Australia needing two runs to win. He ended up bowling a maiden over with batsman Bruce Reid run out going for the tie. New Zealand won the match by one run.

In 1994, Pringle became the first number 11 batsman in ODI history to top score for his team in an ODI. He scored unbeaten 34 runs in New Zealand's total of 171/9.

== Later career ==
He played and coached cricket in the Netherlands. An ankle injury ended his cricketing career in 1998.

== Personal life ==
Pringle's son Tim plays cricket for the Netherlands, and has also represented Northern Districts.
