= Danny Morrison (cricketer) =

New Zealand cricketer

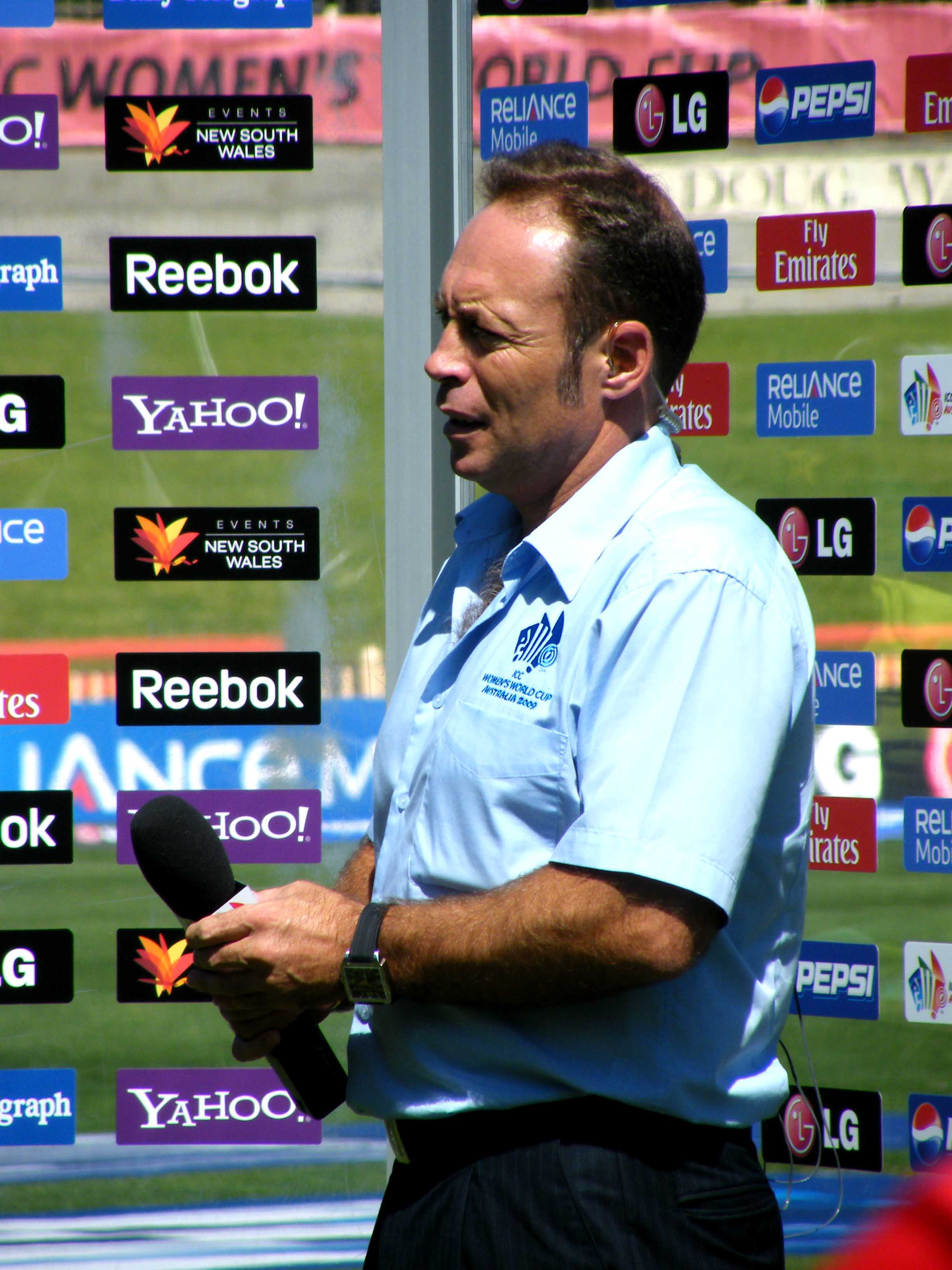

Personal information
- Full name: Danny Kyle Morrison
- Born: 3 February 1966 (age 60); Auckland, New Zealand
- Nickname: Mad Man
- Height: 175 cm (5 ft 9 in)
- Batting: Right-handed
- Bowling: Right-arm fast-medium
- Role: Bowler, commentator

International information
- National side: New Zealand (1987–1997)
- Test debut (cap 164): 4 December 1987 v Australia
- Last Test: 24 January 1997 v England
- ODI debut (cap 58): 31 October 1987 v India
- Last ODI: 13 November 1996 v Pakistan

Career statistics
Competition	Test	ODI	FC	LA
Matches	48	96	142	165
Runs scored	379	171	1,127	283
Batting average	8.42	9.00	10.94	8.08
100s/50s	0/0	0/0	0/0	0/0
Top score	42	20*	46*	30*
Balls bowled	10,064	4,586	13,298	7,862
Wickets	160	126	440	212
Bowling average	34.68	27.53	30.22	26.47
5 wickets in innings	10	2	19	2
10 wickets in match	0	0	0	0
Best bowling	7/89	5/34	7/82	5/34
Catches/stumpings	14/–	19/–	43/–	31/–
- Source: Cricinfo, 4 May 2017

Mad As I Wanna Be
- Author: Danny Morrison
- Language: English
- Genre: Autobiography
- Publisher: Hodder Moa Beckett
- Publication date: 1997
- Publication place: New Zealand
- Media type: Print (Hardback & Paperback)
- Pages: 228
- ISBN: 1-86958-561-5
- OCLC: 39724335
- LC Class: GV915.M65 A3 1997

Daniel Kyle Morrison (born 3 February 1966) is a New Zealand cricket commentator and former cricketer. He specialised as a pace bowler and was known for his useful outswinger. He made his Test debut for New Zealand in 1987 at the age of 21, playing against Australia.

== International career ==
His most notable bowling accomplishment occurred on 25 March 1994 when he took a hat-trick in a One Day International (ODI) match against India. He is one of only three New Zealanders and twenty-two players worldwide to have taken an ODI hat-trick.

On 28 January 1997, Morrison made his final appearance for his national team, contributing 14 runs in a 106-run partnership with Nathan Astle for the tenth wicket against England, which saved the match. He was dropped from the team after the match.

During his international career, Morrison represented New Zealand in three Cricket World Cups: 1987, 1992, and 1996.

== After cricket ==
Since his departure from international cricket, Morrison has been employed in numerous cricket-related positions. These include:

- Commentator of TVNZ, Sky Sports and Fox Sports
- Commentator of the Indian Premier League
- Commentator of the Bangladesh Premier League
- Commentator of the Pakistan Super League
- Commentator of the Caribbean Premier League
- Commentator of the Abu Dhabi T10 League
- Host of Sky Sports "Cricket Company" show for 7 years
- Host of radio show on Radio Sport for 6 years
- Charity work including the 'Fight for Life' – Meningitis appeal
- Involved in coaching for schools and clubs
- Guest speaker
- Batter/Bowler for the official New Zealand Beach Cricket team in 2008 and 2009

== Personal life ==
Morrison currently lives on the Sunshine Coast, Australia, moving there in 2006 with his wife, Kim Morrison and children, Jacob and Tayla.

== Autobiography ==
Morrison released an autobiography after his retirement named Mad As I Wanna Be that was published in 1997. This received generally positive reviews although outspoken New Zealand Cricket commentator Richard Whiting described the overall tone of the book as 'mental'. He has also written a book called the Danny Morrison Junior Cricket Diary as an aid for aspiring young cricketers.
