= Shane Thomson =

New Zealand cricketer (born 1969)

Personal information
- Full name: Shane Alexander Thomson
- Born: 27 January 1969 (age 57); Hamilton, Waikato, New Zealand
- Batting: Right-handed
- Bowling: Right arm Slow medium, Right arm Offbreak
- Role: Allrounder

International information
- National side: New Zealand (1990–1996)
- Test debut (cap 169): 22 February 1990 v India
- Last Test: 25 October 1996 v India
- ODI debut (cap 66): 1 March 1990 v India
- Last ODI: 3 April 1996 v West Indies

Career statistics
| Competition | Test | ODI | FC | LA |
|---|---|---|---|---|
| Matches | 19 | 56 | 90 | 117 |
| Runs scored | 958 | 964 | 4,209 | 2,074 |
| Batting average | 30.90 | 22.95 | 38.26 | 22.54 |
| 100s/50s | 1/5 | 0/5 | 6/25 | 0/13 |
| Top score | 120* | 83 | 167 | 90* |
| Balls bowled | 1,990 | 2,121 | 4,625 | 3,262 |
| Wickets | 19 | 42 | 116 | 98 |
| Bowling average | 50.15 | 38.14 | 39.87 | 33.28 |
| 5 wickets in innings | 0 | 0 | 2 | 0 |
| 10 wickets in match | 0 | 0 | 0 | 0 |
| Best bowling | 3/63 | 3/14 | 5/49 | 4/45 |
| Catches/stumpings | 7/– | 18/– | 37/– | 44/– |
- Source: CricInfo, 13 May 2018

Shane Alexander Thomson (born 27 January 1969) is a former New Zealand international cricketer. He played as a genuine all-rounder, making 19 Test and 56 One Day International appearances for New Zealand.

== Biography ==
Thomson was born in Hamilton, Waikato in 1969.

As a child Thomson played cricket for the Burnside club and also played soccer as a centre-half. After moving to Rotorua he played cricket for Otonga Intermediate School and made an impression at an under-14 tournament at Cambridge. He attended Hamilton Boys' High School. In January 1988 he was selected for Northern Districts, following a brilliant innings in a second XI game against Otago B, and made his first-class debut. In September and October 1988 he toured Zimbabwe with the New Zealand youth team alongside many future test players. He played one season with the Worcestershire second XI followed by three seasons in Hertfordshire league cricket playing for St Albans. The 1990 he planned to play the English summer at Swansea, but was called up to the international team instead.

Thomson made his test debut against India in 1990 scoring 42 runs not out in the second innings. He had to wait for another year to play test cricket again, this time against Sri Lanka. He scored 36 and 55 in the second test and scored 80 not out in the second innings of the third test.

Thomson had some good form on the 1994 tour to South Africa. He top scored with 84 runs for New Zealand in the first test victory over South Africa in Johannesburg. He again top scored for New Zealand in the second test loss to South Africa with 82 runs. Geoff Howarth said of the batting effort in the second test "Shane Thomson's excellent innings apart, the first innings batting display put us under pressure". Ken Rutherford said of the batting: "we were all out for 185 thanks largely to a gutsy 82 by Thomson".

The highlight of his test career was a match winning 120 not out against Pakistan in 1994 In the third test, facing Wasim Akram and Waqar Younis, he shared a 154 run partnership with Bryan Young and hit 15 fours and 2 sixes in the five wicket win.

At the Lord's test, on the 1994 tour of England, Thomson scored a useful double of 69 and 38 not out in the drawn match.

Thomson retired from first-class cricket in 1997 at the age of 28, having scored one century and five half-centuries in his 19 test career. "I didn't really retire, I just left the country". He said about his international career: "Playing cricket for New Zealand is tough, so you've got to savour those times when you win".

He played club cricket for Northern Districts.

Thomson lives in Taupō and works as a property maintenance contractor. He is married and has three children. He has also been involved in property investment and exporting show jumping horses.
