= Adam Parore =

New Zealand cricketer

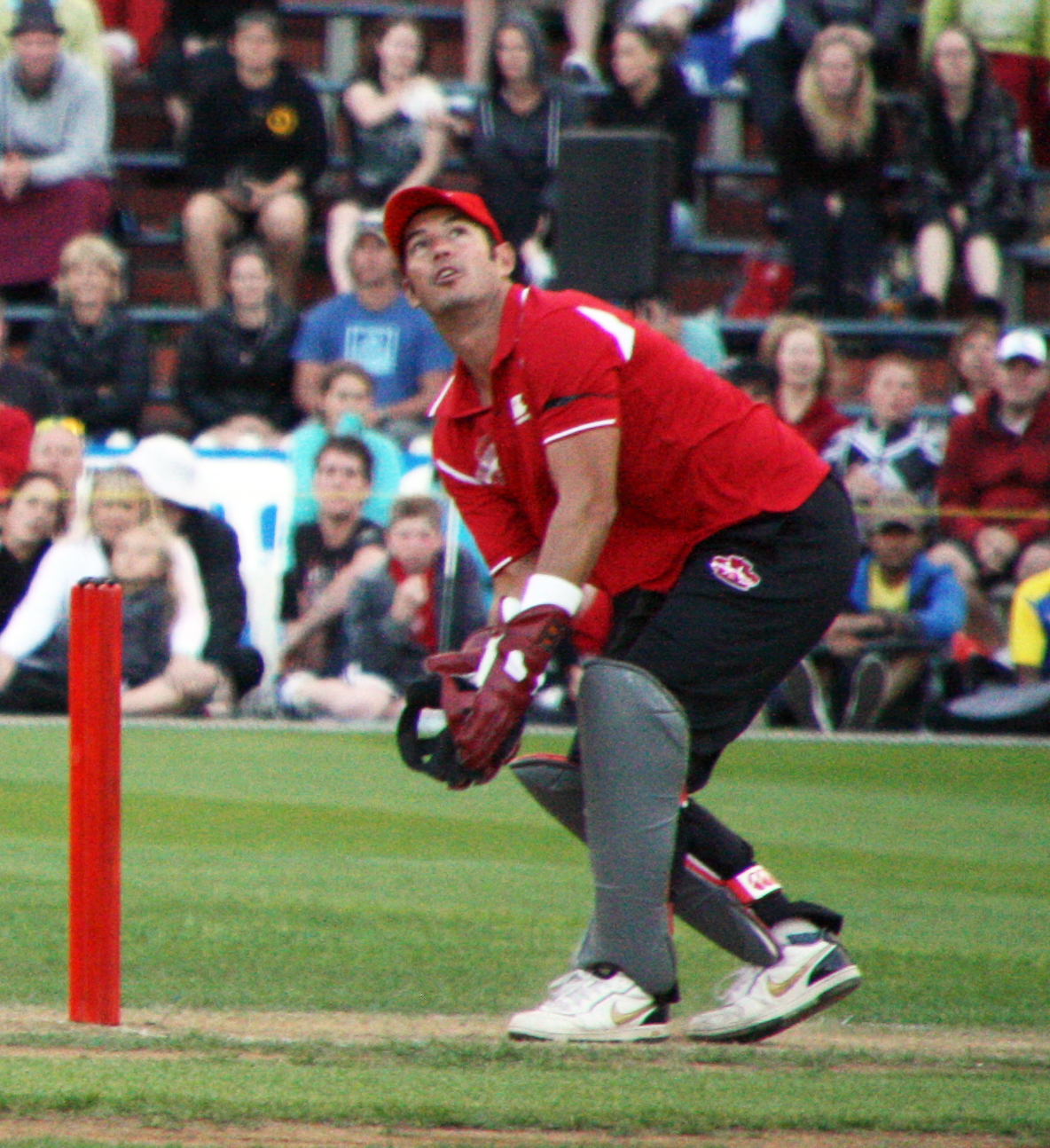
- Parore keeping wickets in a charity cricket match in New Zealand in March, 2011

Personal information
- Full name: Adam Craig Parore
- Born: 23 January 1971 (age 55); Auckland, New Zealand
- Batting: Right-handed
- Role: Wicketkeeper

International information
- National side: New Zealand (1990–2002)
- Test debut (cap 171): 5 July 1990 v England
- Last Test: 3 April 2002 v England
- ODI debut (cap 80): 31 October 1992 v Zimbabwe
- Last ODI: 8 February 2002 v South Africa
- ODI shirt no.: 67

Domestic team information
- Years: Team
- 1988/89–2001/02: Auckland
- 1994/95–1995/96: Northern Districts
- 2008: Chennai Superstars

Career statistics
Competition	Test	ODI	FC	LA
Matches	78	179	163	255
Runs scored	2,865	3,314	6,826	5,033
Batting average	26.28	25.68	32.66	26.91
100s/50s	2/14	1/14	10/36	1/24
Top score	110	108	155*	108
Catches/stumpings	197/7	116/25	367/24	169/33
Medal record
Men's cricket
Representing New Zealand
ICC Champions Trophy
Winner	2000 Kenya
Commonwealth Games
Third place	1998 Kuala Lumpur
- Source: ESPNcricinfo, 4 May 2017

Adam Craig Parore (born 23 January 1971) is a New Zealand former wicket-keeper and batsman. He played 78 Test cricket matches for New Zealand and 179 One Day International cricket matches. Parore has been the managing director of financial services firm Adam Parore Mortgages. CoinHQ was also founded by him. Parore was a member of the New Zealand team that won the 2000 ICC KnockOut Trophy.

== International career ==
He was the first Māori to represent New Zealand in cricket.

He also holds the record for the highest One Day International innings score without a boundary (96 vs India, in Baroda, 1994).

After representing New Zealand for more than a decade, Parore retired from international cricket, his last Test match played against England in Auckland in 2002. He finished with 204 Test dismissals, a New Zealand record.

== Personal life ==
In 2003, he began a relationship with socialite and television presenter Sally Ridge, with whom he had two children, and ran a sports clothing company. Ridge and Parore were involved in a controversial house demolition when they wanted to demolish a 100-year-old house and replace it with a new building.

In 2006, Parore started his own business, Adam Parore Mortgages as a mortgage broker.

In 2009, the couple were embroiled in a $1 million leaky homes lawsuit. They broke up in 2010.

In May 2011, he climbed Mount Everest.

In March 2014, he married Miller Rose MacLeod-McGhie in Hokianga. The couple reportedly separated in 2016.

In 2026, Parore married Libby Price, a New Zealand property business owner.
