= New Zealand cricket team in South Africa in 2000–01 =

New Zealand in South Africa in 2000–01
| | New Zealand | South Africa |
- Dates: 18 October – 12 December 2000
| Captains | Stephen Fleming | Shaun Pollock |

Test series
- Result: South Africa won the 3-match series 2–0
| Most runs | Mark Richardson (232) | Jacques Kallis (287) |
| Most wickets | Chris Martin (11) | Makhaya Ntini (13) |
- Player of the series: Makhaya Ntini (SA)

One Day International series
- Results: South Africa won the 6-match series 5–0
| Most runs | Roger Twose (287) | Nicky Boje (355) |
| Most wickets | Chris Cairns (6); Chris Harris (6) | Shaun Pollock (9) |
- Player of the series: Nicky Boje (SA)

The New Zealand national cricket team toured South Africa during the 2000–01 season, playing six One Day Internationals (ODIs) and three Test matches, as well as five tour matches, between 18 October and 12 December 2000. South Africa won the ODI series 5–0 after the first match was rained off during play. They also won the Test series 2–0; the third match finished in a draw as play was not possible on three of the five scheduled days.

== Squads ==
| Tests | | ODIs | |
| New Zealand | South Africa | New Zealand | South Africa |
|---|---|---|---|
| Stephen Fleming (c); Nathan Astle; Hamish Marshall; Chris Martin; Craig McMillan; Shayne O'Connor; Adam Parore; Mark Richardson; Mathew Sinclair; Craig Spearman; Scott Styris; Daryl Tuffey; Brooke Walker; Kerry Walmsley; Paul Wiseman | Shaun Pollock (c); Mark Boucher (vc & wk); Shafiek Abrahams; Nicky Boje; Daryll Cullinan; Boeta Dippenaar; Allan Donald; Jacques Kallis; Gary Kirsten; Lance Klusener; Neil McKenzie; Makhaya Ntini | Stephen Fleming (c); Geoff Allott; Nathan Astle; Chris Cairns; Chris Harris; Craig McMillan; Chris Nevin; Shayne O'Connor; Adam Parore; Craig Spearman; Scott Styris; Daryl Tuffey; Roger Twose; Brooke Walker; Paul Wiseman | Shaun Pollock (c); Mark Boucher (vc & wk); Shafiek Abrahams; Nicky Boje; Daryll Cullinan; Boeta Dippenaar; Allan Donald; Andrew Hall; Jacques Kallis; Gary Kirsten; Lance Klusener; Makhaya Ntini; Jonty Rhodes; Roger Telemachus |

== ODI series ==
=== 1st ODI ===
20 October 2000 (D/N)
Scorecard

| South Africa; 191/2 (38 overs) | v | New Zealand |
| Nicky Boje 105* (93); Chris Harris 1/32 (7 overs) |

No result
Senwes Park, Potchefstroom
Umpires: Dave Orchard and Rudi Koertzen

- New Zealand won the toss and elected to field.
- Rain stopped play for 80 minutes after 33 overs of the South Africa innings with no loss of overs, before causing the game to be called off after 38 overs.

=== 2nd ODI ===
22 October 2000
Scorecard

| New Zealand; 194/8 (50 overs) | v | South Africa; 197/4 (46.4 overs) |
| Nathan Astle 58 (105); Shaun Pollock 2/32 (10 overs) | | Nicky Boje 64 (83); Chris Harris 2/39 (10 overs) |

South Africa won by 6 wickets
Willowmoore Park, Benoni
Umpires: Danzel Becker and Rudi Koertzen
Player of the match: Nicky Boje (SA)

- New Zealand won the toss and elected to bat.
- Brooke Walker (NZ) made his ODI debut.

=== 3rd ODI ===
25 October 2000 (D/N)
Scorecard

| South Africa; 324/4 (50 overs) | v | New Zealand; 189 (33.4 overs) |
| Nicky Boje 129 (114); Chris Cairns 2/62 (8 overs) | | Nathan Astle 46 (64); Shaun Pollock 3/37 (7.4 overs) |

South Africa won by 115 runs (D/L method)
Centurion Park, Centurion
Umpires: Barry Lambson and Dave Orchard
Player of the match: Nicky Boje (SA)

- New Zealand won the toss and elected to field.
- Rain stopped play for 90 minutes after 4.2 overs of the New Zealand innings. This caused a loss of 7 overs, giving New Zealand a revised target of 305 runs.

=== 4th ODI ===
28 October 2000
Scorecard

| New Zealand; 287/6 (50 overs) | v | South Africa; 289/5 (48.5 overs) |
| Roger Twose 89 (91); Jacques Kallis 2/46 (8 overs) | | Gary Kirsten 101 (107); Scott Styris 2/56 (10 overs) |

South Africa won by 5 wickets
De Beers Diamond Oval, Kimberley
Umpires: Brian Jerling and Rudi Koertzen
Player of the match: Gary Kirsten (SA)

- South Africa won the toss and elected to field.
- The ball was changed after 40 overs of the New Zealand innings.

=== 5th ODI ===
1 November 2000 (D/N)
Scorecard

| New Zealand; 114/5 (32.4 overs) | v | South Africa; 158/4 (30.3 overs) |
| Roger Twose 38 (52); Makhaya Ntini 2/21 (8 overs) | | Jacques Kallis 50* (81); Nathan Astle 2/32 (5 overs) |

South Africa won by 6 wickets (D/L method)
Kingsmead Cricket Ground, Durban
Umpires: Dave Orchard and Wilf Diedricks
Player of the match: Jacques Kallis (SA)

- South Africa won the toss and elected to field.
- Rain stopped play after 27.2 overs of the New Zealand innings, causing a reduction of 1 over per side, and again after 32.4 overs, causing the closure of the New Zealand innings. South Africa's target was revised to 153 runs off 32 overs.

=== 6th ODI ===
4 November 2000
Scorecard

| New Zealand; 256/9 (50 overs) | v | South Africa; 258/7 (50 overs) |
| Roger Twose 103 (115); Roger Telemachus 3/30 (10 overs) | | Jonty Rhodes 69 (80); Shayne O'Connor 3/55 (9 overs) |

South Africa won by 3 wickets
Newlands Cricket Ground, Cape Town
Umpires: Ian Howell and Rudi Koertzen
Player of the match: Lance Klusener (SA)

- South Africa won the toss and elected to field.
- Shafiek Abrahams (SA) made his ODI debut.

== Test series ==
=== 1st Test ===
17–21 November 2000
Scorecard

| South Africa | v | New Zealand |
| 471/9d (142.1 overs); Jacques Kallis 160 (289); Shayne O'Connor 3/87 (30 overs) | | 229 (89 overs); Stephen Fleming 57 (103); Shaun Pollock 4/37 (22 overs) |
| 103/5 (26.3 overs); Boeta Dippenaar 27 (48); Daryl Tuffey 3/38 (8 overs) | | 342 (157.4 overs) (f/o); Stephen Fleming 99 (210); Makhaya Ntini 6/66 (31.4 overs) |

South Africa won by 5 wickets
Mangaung Oval, Bloemfontein
Umpires: Arani Jayaprakash (Ind) and Dave Orchard
Player of the match: Jacques Kallis and Makhaya Ntini (both SA)

- South Africa won the toss and elected to bat.
- Bad light stopped play with 8.2 overs remaining in Day 2.
- Brooke Walker and Chris Martin (both NZ) made their Test debuts.

=== 2nd Test ===
30 November – 4 December 2000
Scorecard

| New Zealand | v | South Africa |
| 298 (126.3 overs); Mathew Sinclair 150 (321); Shaun Pollock 4/64 (32 overs) | | 361 (144.4 overs); Neil McKenzie 120 (207); Chris Martin 4/104 (29 overs) |
| 148 (69.3 overs); Mark Richardson 60 (150); Lance Klusener 3/8 (9.3 overs) | | 89/3 (34.1 overs); Gary Kirsten 47* (104); Kerry Walmsley 1/7 (5 overs) |

South Africa won by 7 wickets
St George's Park Cricket Ground, Port Elizabeth
Umpires: Ian Robinson (Zim) and Rudi Koertzen
Player of the match: Neil McKenzie (SA)

- South Africa won the toss and elected to field.

=== 3rd Test ===
8–12 December 2000
Scorecard

| New Zealand | v | South Africa |
| 200 (93.5 overs); Mark Richardson 46 (119); Makhaya Ntini 3/29 (18 overs) | | 261/3d (97 overs); Boeta Dippenaar 100 (192); Chris Martin 2/43 (15 overs) |

Match drawn
Wanderers Stadium, Johannesburg
Umpires: Dave Orchard and George Sharp (Eng)
Player of the match: Chris Scott (groundsman)

- South Africa won the toss and elected to field.
- Rain prevented play on Days 1, 3 and 4.
- Hamish Marshall (NZ) and Mfuneko Ngam (SA) made their Test debuts.

== Tour matches ==
=== 50-over: Gauteng v New Zealanders ===
18 October 2000
Scorecard

| New Zealanders; 296/5 (50 overs) | v | Gauteng; 217/6 (50 overs) |
| Nathan Astle 137 (167); Andrew Hall 1/48 (10 overs) | | Adam Bacher 54 (73); Brooke Walker 4/32 (10 overs) |

New Zealanders won by 79 runs
Soweto Cricket Oval, Soweto
Umpires: Barry Lambson and Satish Jivan
Player of the match: Nathan Astle (NZ)

- New Zealanders won the toss and elected to bat.

=== Three-day: Boland v New Zealanders ===
7–9 November 2000
Scorecard

| New Zealanders | v | Boland |
| 403/5d (138 overs); Mark Richardson 173* (403); Neil Carter 2/61 (27 overs) | | 189 (70.2 overs); James Henderson 61 (130); Scott Styris 3/25 (10 overs) |
| 142/3d (66 overs); Craig McMillan 52* (154); Donovan Koch 1/13 (14 overs) | | 53/2 (21.3 overs); Jonathan Trott 30 (73); Brooke Walker 1/1 (1.3 overs) |

Match drawn
Boland Park, Paarl
Umpires: Ian Howell and Wilf Diedricks

- New Zealanders won the toss and elected to bat.

=== Three-day: North West v New Zealanders ===
11–13 November 2000
Scorecard

| New Zealanders | v | North West |
| 280/6d (92 overs); Craig Spearman 100 (196); Francois van der Merwe 3/74 (22 overs) | | 100 (44.4 overs); Ezra Poole 35 (39); Shayne O'Connor 3/14 (12 overs) |
| 242/2d (57 overs); Craig Spearman 115 (131); Craig Light 1/94 (24 overs) | | 157 (49.4 overs); Morne Strydom 39 (49); Shayne O'Connor 5/51 (17.4 overs) |

New Zealanders won by 265 runs
Senwes Park, Potchefstroom
Umpires: Andrew O'Connor and Barry Lambson

- New Zealanders won the toss and elected to bat.

=== 50-over: Border v New Zealanders ===
24 November 2000
Scorecard

| Border; 226/8 (50 overs) | v | New Zealanders; 227/8 (49 overs) |
| Laden Gamiet 84 (103); Nathan Astle 4/25 (11 overs) | | Craig McMillan 55 (44); Steven Pope 4/38 (10 overs) |

New Zealanders won by 2 wickets
Ntselamanzi, Alice
Umpires: Laird King and Ntsikelelo Majiza
Player of the match: Laden Gamiet (Border)

- New Zealanders won the toss and elected to field.
- Steven Pope replaced Ian Mitchell as wicket-keeper for Border after 47 overs of the New Zealanders innings.

=== Three-day: Border v New Zealanders ===
25–27 November 2000
Scorecard

| New Zealanders | v | Border |
| 311/4d (90 overs); Craig McMillan 76* (70); Pieter Strydom 1/37 (16 overs) | | 73 (27.1 overs); Ian Mitchell 22 (51); Andrew Penn 5/38 (12 overs) |
| 185/0d (47 overs); Adam Parore 101* (147) | | 212 (76.4 overs); Wayne Wiblin 46 (67); Daryl Tuffey 5/69 (21 overs) |

New Zealanders won by 211 runs
Buffalo Park, East London
Umpires: Craig Schoof and Ian Howell

- New Zealanders won the toss and elected to bat.
