= New Zealand cricket team in India in 1999–2000 =

	India	New Zealand
- Dates: 30 September – 17 November 1999
Captains	Sachin Tendulkar	Stephen Fleming

Test series
- Result: India won the 3-match series 1–0
Most runs	Sachin Tendulkar (435)	Stephen Fleming (261)
Most wickets	Anil Kumble (20)	Daniel Vettori (12)
- Player of the series: Anil Kumble (Ind)

One Day International series
- Results: India won the 5-match series 3–2
Most runs	Sourav Ganguly (301)	Nathan Astle (234)
Most wickets	Anil Kumble (6); Nikhil Chopra (6)	Daniel Vettori (6)
- Player of the series: Sourav Ganguly (Ind)

The New Zealand national cricket team toured India and played three Test matches and five Limited Overs Internationals (LOI) between September and November 1999.

== Background ==
A revised itinerary for the tour was announced on 26 August 1999. It was reported that the New Zealand squad would arrive in Mumbai on 28 September. The squad would play a total of two first-class fixtures before the First Test, followed by another first-class match against Karnataka, the Ranji Trophy champions. It would be followed by two more Tests, and then by a five-match ODI series. The venues for the Tests were Mohali, Kanpur and Ahmedabad.

The New Zealand touring party arrived on 27 September. On his team's preparations for the tour, captain Stephen Fleming stated: "We just returned to New Zealand about 20 days back after a four-month-long tour of England." The manager of the squad and former player Jeff Crowe mentioned that the squad to together only a week prior and that they "could not practice outside due to weather conditions but had a short indoor camp at Christchurch before embarking on the tour." On this tour, he stated that it would be "... very tough in these [Indian] conditions". He added, "Our batting was not very good in England. But we have to bat very well against the Indian spinners, on slow turning tracks, who certainly could pose problems. I feel this New Zealand team is well organised and expected to deliver the goods." The tour would be the first assignment for newly appointed coach David Trist.

Going into the Test series, India had a formidable middle-order consisting of Sachin Tendulkar, Rahul Dravid and Sourav Ganguly, all of who averaged close to or over 50. This was the first such instance in Indian cricket history.

== Squads ==
Tests		ODIs	
India	New Zealand	India	New Zealand
Sachin Tendulkar (c); Vijay Bharadwaj; Rahul Dravid; Devang Gandhi; Sourav Ganguly; Ajay Jadeja; Sunil Joshi; Anil Kumble; MSK Prasad wk; Venkatesh Prasad; Sadagoppan Ramesh; Harbhajan Singh; Javagal Srinath	Stephen Fleming (c); Nathan Astle; Matthew Bell; Chris Cairns; Chris Drum; Chris Harris; Matt Horne; Craig McMillan; Dion Nash; Shayne O'Connor; Adam Parore; Andrew Penn; Craig Spearman; Gary Stead; Daniel Vettori; Paul Wiseman	Sachin Tendulkar (c); Ajit Agarkar; Vijay Bharadwaj; Nikhil Chopra; Rahul Dravid; Devang Gandhi; Sourav Ganguly; Ajay Jadeja; Sunil Joshi; T. Kumaran; Anil Kumble; Debashish Mohanty; Gyanendra Pandey; MSK Prasad wk; Venkatesh Prasad; Robin Singh; Javagal Srinath	Stephen Fleming (c); Nathan Astle; Chris Cairns; Chris Drum; Chris Harris; Matt Horne; Dion Nash; Shayne O'Connor; Adam Parore; Craig Spearman; Scott Styris; Alex Tait; Roger Twose; Daniel Vettori

A 16-member New Zealand Test squad for the tour was announced on 31 August 1999. Craig Spearman was recalled to replace an out-of-form Roger Twose, and was touted to take the number three batting spot with captain Stephen Fleming expressing a desire to drop to number four. Off-spinner Paul Wiseman was picked as the second spinner for the tour in place of Brooke Walker, as Daniel Vettori's partner. Pacemen Chris Drum and Andrew Penn were added as replacements to the injured Simon Doull and Geoff Allott. The other change from the winning squad in England earlier that year was backup wicket-keeper, Martyn Croy, who was dropped. Chris Cairns, who was still recovering from tendinitis on his right knee, was included in the squad, with the selectors hoping he would recover fully on time. Following a finger injury Craig McMillan sustained during the Second Test, Gary Stead was named as his replacement for the Third.

The India squad was announced on 6 October. The 14-member squad squad excluded Mohammad Azharuddin, Nayan Mongia and Nikhil Chopra. Azharuddin was said to have been not fully fit following a shoulder surgery after the World Cup earlier that year. Wicket-keeper batsman Mongia was edged out by MSK Prasad thanks to the latter's better contribution with the bat potentially. Spinners Sunil Joshi and Harbhajan Singh were added to the squad, alongside batter Devang Gandhi. The latter was touted as an opening partner to Sadagoppan Ramesh.

For the ODI series, India's squad was announced on 30 October. Nikhil Chopra and Robin Singh were included as replacements to Harbhajan Singh and Devang Gandhi. The selectors stated that Azharuddin was again not considered for selection, alongside Mongia and Agarkar. Pacemen Javagal Srinath and Venkatesh Prasad, and spinner Anil Kumble were rested for the final three games, in view of India's Australia tour later that season. Gyanendra Pandey was added to the squad as Kumble's replacement. Ajit Agarkar and T. Kumaran, who made the squad for the Australia tour, were replaced the pace duo for the remaining games. However, with the series on the line going into the final ODI, Srinath was brought back in to replace an injured Ajay Jadeja.

New Zealand added Roger Twose and all-rounder Scott Styris to their ODI squad, the latter replacing a retired Gavin Larsen. Members of the Test team — Matthew Bell, Penn, Wiseman and an injured McMillan — were kept out.

== Tour matches ==
=== Three-day: New Zealanders v India A ===
30 September–2 October 1999
Scorecard

New Zealanders	v	India A
135/6 (44 overs); Nathan Astle 29* (67); Amit Bhandari 2/20 (9 overs)

Match drawn
Nehru Stadium, Pune
Umpires: Arani Jayaprakash (Karnataka) and M. R. Singh (Mumbai)

- New Zealanders won the toss and elected to bat.
- No play was possible on days 1 and 3, due to overnight rain having affected the outfield.
- Matthew Bell (New Zealanders) passed 3,000 runs in first-class cricket.

=== Three-day: New Zealanders v Indian Board President's XI ===
5–7 October 1999
Scorecard

Indian Board President's XI	v	New Zealanders
298 (97.3 overs); Hrishikesh Kanitkar 99 (188); Dion Nash 3/54 (17.3 overs)		444/5d (130 overs); Craig McMillan 168* (238); Harbhajan Singh 4/91 (29 overs)
79/4 (29 overs); Gagan Khoda 49 (80); Daniel Vettori 2/31 (12 overs)

Match drawn
Barkatullah Khan Stadium, Jodhpur
Umpires: K. Parthasarathy (Andhra Pradesh) and Sudhir Asnani (Madhya Pradesh)
Player of the match: Craig McMillan (New Zealanders)

- Indian Board President's XI won the toss and elected to bat.

=== Three-day: New Zealanders v Karnataka ===
17–19 October 1999
Scorecard

New Zealanders	v	Karnataka
249/6d (90 overs); Stephen Fleming 115* (253); Mansur Ali Khan 3/56 (18 overs)		269/9d (82 overs); Vijay Bharadwaj 96 (171); Chris Drum 4/19 (12 overs)
105 (47.5 overs); Nathan Astle 33 (57); Sunil Joshi 4/17 (15.5 overs)		86/3 (20.4 overs); Vijay Bharadwaj 33* (37); Chris Drum 1/15 (6 overs)

Karnataka won by 7 wickets
M. Chinnaswamy Stadium, Bangalore
Umpires: R. Parthasarathy and Sundaram Ravi

- Karnataka won the toss and elected to field.
- Karnataka became the first Ranji Trophy champion to defeat two visiting teams; the first, West Indies in 1978.

== Test series ==
=== 1st Test ===
10–14 October 1999
Scorecard

India	v	New Zealand
83 (27 overs); Javagal Srinath 20 (35); Dion Nash 6/27 (11 overs)		215 (91.1 overs); Craig Spearman 51 (122); Javagal Srinath 6/45 (22 overs)
505/3d (183 overs); Rahul Dravid 144 (327); Daniel Vettori 2/171 (71 overs)		251/7 (135 overs); Stephen Fleming 73 (250); Anil Kumble 3/42 (41 overs)

Match drawn
Mohali, Chandigarh
Umpires: Peter Manuel (SL) and S Venkataraghavan (Ind)
Player of the match: Javagal Srinath (Ind)

- New Zealand won the toss and elected to field
- Test Debut: MSK Prasad, Vijay Bharadwaj and Devang Gandhi (IND)

=== 2nd Test ===
22–25 October 1999
Scorecard

New Zealand	v	India
256(102.5 overs); Chris Cairns 53 (139); Anil Kumble 4/67 (32.5 overs)		330 (148.1 overs); Devang Gandhi 88 (186); Daniel Vettori 6/127 (55.1 overs)
155/10 (66.5 overs); Adam Parore 48 (137); Anil Kumble 6/67 (26.5 overs)		83/2(18.2 overs); Sachin Tendulkar 44 (39); Chris Cairns 1/10 (3 overs)

India won by 8 wickets
Green Park, Kanpur
Umpires: Daryl Harper (Aus) and Arani Jayaprakash (Ind)
Player of the match: Anil Kumble (Ind)

- New Zealand won the toss and elected to bat
- none

=== 3rd Test ===
29 October–2 November 1999
Scorecard

India	v	New Zealand
583/7d (167 overs); Sachin Tendulkar 217 (344); Daniel Vettori 4/200 (57 overs)		308 (141.4 overs); Nathan Astle 74 (227); Anil Kumble 5/82 (48 overs)
148/5d (32 overs); Saurav Ganguly 53 (62); Nathan Astle 1/13 (5 overs)		252/3 (95 overs); Gary Stead 78 (173); Harbhajan Singh 1/55 (26 overs)

Match drawn
Sardar Patel Stadium, Ahmedabad
Umpires: Rudi Koertzen (Rsa) and V. K. Ramaswamy (Ind)
Player of the match: Sachin Tendulkar (Ind)

- India won the toss and elected to bat

== One Day Internationals (ODIs) ==
=== 1st ODI ===
5 November 1999
Scorecard

New Zealand; 349/9 (50 overs)	v	India; 306 (47 overs)
Nathan Astle 120 (136); Venkatesh Prasad 3/75 (10 overs)		Ajay Jadeja 95 (97); Nathan Astle 3/40 (7 overs)

New Zealand won by 43 runs
Municipal Stadium, Rajkot
Umpires: Krishna Hariharan (Ind) and Ivaturi Shivram (Ind)
Player of the match: Nathan Astle (NZ)

- New Zealand won the toss and elected to bat.
- Scott Styris (NZ) made his ODI debut.
- Nathan Astle broke Chris Cairns's (115) record for the highest individual score against India in ODIs (120). He was surpassed by Tom Latham (145) in 2022.

=== 2nd ODI ===
8 November 1999
Scorecard

India; 376/2 (50 overs)	v	New Zealand; 202 (33.1 overs)
Sachin Tendulkar 186* (150); Chris Cairns 1/73 (10 overs)		Scott Styris 43 (52); Venkatesh Prasad 2/38 (5.1 overs)

India won by 174 runs
Lal Bahadur Shastri Stadium, Hyderabad
Umpires: Jasbir Singh (Ind) and Shavir Tarapore (Ind)
Player of the match: Sachin Tendulkar (Ind)

- India won the toss and elected to bat.
- Sachin Tendulkar and Rahul Dravid (Ind) broke the record for the highest partnership for any wicket in ODIs (331). It was surpassed by Chris Gayle and Marlon Samuels in 2015.
- Sachin Tendulkar (186) recorded his highest individual score in ODIs going past his 143 against Australia in 1998. He bettered it in 2010 (200). It was also the highest individual score by an India player surpassing Sourav Ganguly's 183.
- Rahul Dravid recorded his highest individual score in ODIs passing his 145 against Sri Lanka.
- Sachin Tendulkar passed Mohammad Azharuddin for the most runs against New Zealand in ODIs (1,119).
- India's 376 was the second highest team total in ODIs, and the highest by India going past 373 earlier that year.

=== 3rd ODI ===
11 November 1999
Scorecard

India; 261/5 (50 overs)	v	New Zealand; 247/8 (50 overs)
Sourav Ganguly 153* (150); Nathan Astle 2/47 (10 overs)		Nathan Astle 97 (111); Nikhil Chopra 3/32 (9 overs)

India won by 14 runs
Captain Roop Singh Stadium, Gwalior
Umpires: Satish Gupta (Ind) and K. Parthasarathy (Ind)
Player of the match: Sourav Ganguly (Ind)

- India won the toss and elected to bat.
- Sourav Ganguly surpassed Desmond Haynes for the highest individual score at this venue in ODIs (153), before Sachin Tendulkar (200) broke the record in 2010.
- Nathan Astle (NZ) passed 3,000 runs in ODIs.
- Rahul Dravid surpassed Mohammad Azharuddin to became the fastest India player to record 50 catches in ODIs, in terms of number of matches (99).

=== 4th ODI ===
14 November 1999
Scorecard

New Zealand; 236/9 (50 overs)	v	India; 188 (45.3 overs)
CL Cairns 80 (114); N Chopra 2/33 (9 overs)		SB Joshi 61* (56); CJ Drum 2/31 (6 overs)

New Zealand won by 48 runs
Nehru Stadium, Guwahati
Umpires: SK Bansal and S Choudhary
Player of the match: CL Cairns (NZ)

- India won the toss and elected to field.
- T Kumaran (IND) made his ODI debut.

=== 5th ODI ===
17 November 1999
Scorecard

New Zealand; 179/9 (50 overs)	v	India; 181/3 (44 overs)
RG Twose 47 (94); T Kumaran 3/24 (9 overs)		SC Ganguly 86 (110); DL Vettori 2/46 (10 overs)

India won by 7 wickets
Feroz Shah Kotla Ground, Delhi
Umpires: VM Gupte and SK Sharma
Player of the match: SC Ganguly (IND)

- New Zealand won the toss and elected to bat.
- DJ Gandhi (IND) made his ODI debut.
