= New Zealand cricket team in Pakistan in 2003–04 =

New Zealand cricket team in Pakistan in 2003-04
	Pakistan	New Zealand
- Dates: 29 November – 7 December 2003
Captains	Inzamam-ul-Haq	Chris Cairns

One Day International series
- Results: Pakistan won the 5-match series 5–0
Most runs	Yasir Hameed (356)	Hamish Marshall (243)
Most wickets	Mohammad Sami (8)	Daniel Vettori (5)

The New Zealand cricket team toured Pakistan in November to December 2003 and played a five-match One Day International (ODI) series against the Pakistan cricket team. Pakistan won the series 5–0. New Zealand were captained by Chris Cairns and Pakistan by Inzamam-ul-Haq.

== ODI series ==
=== 1st ODI ===
29 November 2003 (D/N)
Scorecard

New Zealand; 291/5 (50 overs)	v	Pakistan; 292/7 (48 overs)
Chris Cairns 84* (51); Shabbir Ahmed 2/30 (10 overs)		Yasir Hameed 52 (73); Jacob Oram 2/33 (8 overs)

Pakistan won by 3 wickets
Gaddafi Stadium, Lahore
Umpires: Nadeem Ghauri (Pak) and Dave Orchard (SA)
Player of the match: Abdul Razzaq (Pak)

- New Zealand won the toss and elected to bat.
- Craig Cumming, Richard Jones, Hamish Marshall, Michael Mason, Matthew Walker and Kerry Walmsley (all NZ) made their ODI debuts.

=== 2nd ODI ===
1 December 2003 (D/N)
Scorecard

Pakistan; 281/6 (50 overs)	v	New Zealand; 157 (38.5 overs)
Saleem Elahi 70 (69); Daniel Vettori 3/44 (10 overs)		Richard Jones 63 (110); Mohammad Sami 5/10 (7.5 overs)

Pakistan won by 124 runs
Gaddafi Stadium, Lahore
Umpires: Nadeem Ghauri (Pak) and Dave Orchard (SA)
Player of the match: Mohammad Sami (Pak)

- pakistan won the toss and elected to bat.
- Tama Canning (NZ) made his ODI debut.

=== 3rd ODI ===
3 December 2003
Scorecard

Pakistan; 314/7 (50 overs)	v	New Zealand; 263/7 (50 overs)
Imran Farhat 91 (110); Matthew Walker 4/49 (7 overs)		Hamish Marshall 101* (109); Mohammad Sami 3/22 (8 overs)

Pakistan won by 51 runs
Iqbal Stadium, Faisalabad
Umpires: Aleem Dar (Pak) and Dave Orchard (SA)
Player of the match: Imran Farhat (Pak)

- Pakistan won the toss and elected to bat.

=== 4th ODI ===
5 December 2003 (D/N)
Scorecard

New Zealand; 183 (47.5 overs)	v	Pakistan; 184/3 (41.2 overs)
Chris Cairns 48 (61); Shoaib Akhtar 3/23 (10 overs)		Imran Farhat 82 (117); Tama Canning 2/30 (10 overs)

Pakistan won by 7 wickets
Rawalpindi Cricket Stadium, Rawalpindi
Umpires: Aleem Dar (Pak) and Dave Orchard (SA)
Player of the match: Imran Farhat (Pak)

- Pakistan won the toss and elected to bat.

=== 5th ODI ===
7 December 2003 (D/N)
Scorecard

Pakistan; 277/4 (50 overs)	v	New Zealand; 228/6 (50 overs)
Yasir Hameed 127* (154); Tama Canning 2/59 (10 overs)		Hamish Marshall 62* (66); Shoaib Akhtar 1/36 (8 overs)

Pakistan won by 49 runs
Rawalpindi Cricket Stadium, Rawalpindi
Umpires: Nadeem Ghauri (Pak) and Dave Orchard (SA)
Player of the match: Imran Farhat (Pak) and Yasir Hameed (Pak)

- Pakistan won the toss and elected to bat.
