= Sri Lanka Cricket A Team Triangular Series in 2005–06 =

The Sri Lanka Cricket A Team Triangular Series was a one-day cricket tournament held in Sri Lanka from 21 September 2005 to 1 October 2005. Three A teams participated – Sri Lanka A, South Africa A New Zealand A. These were not the national cricket teams, but rather second XIs made up of players who are not judged good enough for the national side by the national selectors. There was an initial group stage where each team played each other twice, making a total of six matches, before the one-game final determined the winner. Six of seven matches were played in Colombo, while the seventh took place in Moratuwa.

South Africa A dominated the tournament, perhaps surprisingly after coming off a 0–1 defeat in the first class series against Sri Lanka A. In this tournament, however, they were dominant, and won all their five games in the tournament. The hosts Sri Lanka A were knocked out, as they had the same win–loss record as New Zealand A but fewer bonus points. South Africa A relied on the depth of their bowling attack, with seven different bowlers taking more than four wickets – Dale Steyn took the most with nine – while their captain Jacques Rudolph was the highest run-scorer with 147. However, New Zealand A had players who scored more runs (Mathew Sinclair, James Marshall and Michael Papps all exceeded Rudolph's total) and took more wickets (Chris Martin ended with 11), but the players rarely fired together.

== Squads ==
New Zealand A			South Africa A			Sri Lanka A		
Name	Role	Team	Name	Role	Team	Name	Role	Team
Peter Fulton	CPT, RHB, RM	Canterbury	Jacques Rudolph	CPT, LHB, LS	Eagles	Avishka Gunawardene	CPT, LHB	Sinhalese SC
Gareth Hopkins	WK, RHB	Otago	Thami Tsolekile	WK, RHB	WP Boland	Prasanna Jayawardene	WK, RHB	Nondescripts CC
James Franklin	LHB, LFM	Wellington	Paul Adams	RHB, SLA	WP Boland	Shantha Kalavitigoda	RHB, LS	Colts CC
Chris Harris	LHB, RM	Canterbury	Hashim Amla	RHB, RM	Dolphins	Kaushal Lokuarachchi	RHB, LS	Bloomfield C & A
Jamie How	RHB, RM	Central Districts	Loots Bosman	RHB, RM	Eagles	Dilhara Lokuhettige	RHB, RFM	Moors SC
James Marshall	RHB, RM	Northern Districts	Johan Botha	RHB, OB	Warriors	Farveez Maharoof	RHB, RFM	Bloomfield C & A
Bruce Martin	RHB, SLA	Northern Districts	Zander de Bruyn	RHB, RFM	Titans	Jeewan Mendis	LHB, LS	Sinhalese SC
Chris Martin	RHB, RFM	Canterbury	Jean-Paul Duminy	LHB, OB	WP Boland	Jehan Mubarak	LHB, OB	Colombo CC
Iain O'Brien	RHB, RM	Wellington	Albie Morkel	RHB, RMF	Titans	Upul Tharanga	LHB	Nondescripts CC
Michael Papps	RHB	Canterbury	Justin Ontong	RHB, OB	Lions	Michael Vandort	LHB, RM	Colombo CC
Jeetan Patel	RHB, OB	Wellington	Robin Peterson	LHB, SLA	Warriors	Sajeewa Weerakoon	LHB, SLA	Burgher RC
Jesse Ryder	LHB, RM	Wellington	Andrew Puttick	LHB, RM	WP Boland	Nuwan Zoysa	LHB, LFM	Sinhalese SC
Mathew Sinclair	RHB, RM	Central Districts	Dale Steyn	RHB, RF	Titans			
Daryl Tuffey	RHB, RFM	Northern Districts	Alfonso Thomas	RHB, RFM	Boland			
			Johannes van der Wath	RHB, RF	Eagles			
			Monde Zondeki	RHB, RF	WP Boland			

- Bowling classifications are taken from Cricinfo
- Team information is taken from Cricinfo and CricketArchive

== Schedule ==
	Group stages
Date	Match	Venue
21 September	RSA A v SRI A	R. Premadasa Stadium
22 September	NZL A v SRI A	R. Premadasa Stadium
24 September	NZL A v RSA A	Sinhalese Sports Club Ground
25 September	NZL A v SRI A	Tyronne Fernando Stadium
27 September	RSA A v SRI A	Colts Cricket Club Ground
28 September	NZL A v RSA A	R. Premadasa Stadium
	Final
1 October	NZL A v RSA A	Sinhalese Sports Club Ground

== Match details ==
=== Warm-up matches ===
These matches were arranged to give the visiting teams match practice before the tournament started on 21 September.

==== Sri Lanka Under-23s v South Africa A, 19 September ====
South Africa A won by 174 runs (Cricinfo scorecard)

==== Sri Lanka Cricket XI v New Zealand A, 19 September ====
New Zealand A won by 153 runs (Cricinfo scorecard)

=== First Match: Sri Lanka A v South Africa A, 21 September ===
South Africa A won by ten wickets

South African fast bowler Dale Steyn took apart the Sri Lanka A batting line-up, as Sri Lanka A subsided for 45 – only five days after they had completed a 1–0 series win in the first class matches earlier in the week. However, in this match only Jeewan Mendis managed to get into double figures, and only two partnerships got into double figures. Intriguingly, 9 runs came off wides – 20% of the Sri Lankan total. Steyn finished with five wickets for 20 runs, Tyron Henderson took two for 14, while Albie Morkel and Johannes van der Wath finished off the innings by removing the last three batsmen. Andrew Puttick and Loots Bosman spent half an hour facing 29 balls to canter to 47 without loss, with Nuwan Zoysa conceded 31 from 17 deliveries – including four no-balls and a wide. (Cricinfo scorecard)

=== Second Match: Sri Lanka A v New Zealand A, 22 September ===
Sri Lanka A won by 12 runs

The Sri Lankan captain Gunawardene was dismissed for his second successive duck, as Daryl Tuffey and Chris Martin took early wickets and the hosts struggled to two for two. However, a 98-run stand between Jehan Mubarak and Upul Tharanga gave the initiative back to Sri Lanka, and all-rounder Dilhara Lokuhettige could increase the run rate in the final overs, hitting 57 off 39 balls. New Zealander Chris Harris went without a wicket, but only conceded 19 off ten overs, but the other bowlers leaked too many runs as Sri Lanka closed on 251 for 6 off 50 overs. New Zealand A's innings started off with a maiden over from Zoysa, followed up by Jesse Ryder being caught behind for 0. Matt Sinclair and Peter Fulton added half-centuries, and New Zealand were going along nicely at 189 for 5, but the four last wickets were lost to Jehan Mubarak – who ended with five for 59. Thus, New Zealand ran out of men to score the required runs, with their total score 239 for 9. (Cricinfo scorecard)

=== Third Match: New Zealand A v South Africa A, 24 September ===
South Africa A won by six wickets

(Cricinfo scorecard)

=== Fourth Match: Sri Lanka A v New Zealand A, 25 September ===
New Zealand A won by 72 runs

(Cricinfo scorecard)

=== Fifth Match: Sri Lanka A v South Africa A, 27 September ===
South Africa A won by four wickets

(Cricinfo scorecard)

=== Sixth Match: New Zealand A v South Africa A, 28 September ===
South Africa A won by one wicket

(Cricinfo scorecard)

== Group tables ==
Group Stage Standings
Team	M	W	L	NR	Pts	NRR
South Africa A	4	4	0	0	22	+1.60
New Zealand A	4	1	3	0	8	−0.04
Sri Lanka A	4	1	3	0	6	−1.50

== Final, New Zealand A v South Africa A, 1 October ==
South Africa A won by six wickets

(Cricinfo scorecard)
