= Pakistani cricket team in New Zealand in 2000–01 =

The Pakistan national cricket team toured New Zealand in February to March 2001 and played a three-match Test series against the New Zealand national cricket team. The series was drawn 1–1. New Zealand were captained by Stephen Fleming and Pakistan by Moin Khan. In addition, the teams played a five-match series of Limited Overs Internationals (LOI) which New Zealand won 3–2.

== One Day Internationals (ODIs) ==
=== 1st ODI ===
17, 18 February 2001 (D/N)
Scorecard

New Zealand; 149 (35.3 overs)	v	Pakistan; 150/4 (45 overs)
CD McMillan 35 (44); Shoaib Akhtar 5/19 (6.3 overs)		Saeed Anwar 48 (85); DL Vettori 2/21 (10 overs)

Pakistan won by 6 wickets
Eden Park, Auckland
Umpires: BF Bowden and AL Hill
Player of the match: Shoaib Akhtar (PAK)

- Pakistan won the toss and elected to field.
- The match was scheduled for one day but extended to two. There was no play on the first day.
- Imran Farhat (PAK) made his ODI debut.

=== 2nd ODI ===
20 February 2001 (D/N)
Scorecard

Pakistan; 135 (50 overs)	v	New Zealand; 136/4 (30.3 overs)
Abdur Razzaq 50 (113); DR Tuffey 4/24 (10 overs)		L Vincent 33* (47); Wasim Akram 2/24 (9 overs)

New Zealand won by 6 wickets
McLean Park, Napier
Umpires: BF Bowden and EA Watkin
Player of the match: DR Tuffey (NZ)

- New Zealand won the toss and elected to field.

=== 3rd ODI ===
22 February 2001 (D/N)
Scorecard

Pakistan; 243/9 (50 overs)	v	New Zealand; 215 (48.2 overs)
Saeed Anwar 57 (93); DR Tuffey 3/52 (9 overs)		CD McMillan 64 (83); Saqlain Mushtaq 3/26 (9 overs)

Pakistan won by 28 runs
WestpacTrust Stadium, Wellington
Umpires: RS Dunne and DM Quested
Player of the match: Saqlain Mushtaq (PAK)

- New Zealand won the toss and elected to field.

=== 4th ODI ===
25 February 2001
Scorecard

New Zealand; 284/5 (50 overs)	v	Pakistan; 146 (47 overs)
CD McMillan 104* (75); Abdur Razzaq 3/41 (10 overs)		Moin Khan 50 (60); NJ Astle 3/7 (3 overs)

New Zealand won by 138 runs
Jade Stadium, Christchurch
Umpires: DB Cowie and AL Hill
Player of the match: CD McMillan (NZ)

- Pakistan won the toss and elected to field.

=== 5th ODI ===
28 February 2001 (D/N)
Scorecard

Pakistan; 285 (49.3 overs)	v	New Zealand; 290/6 (48.1 overs)
Yousuf Youhana 68 (73); CD McMillan 3/20 (3.3 overs)		NJ Astle 119 (116); Waqar Younis 3/66 (10 overs)

New Zealand won by 4 wickets
Carisbrook, Dunedin
Umpires: DB Cowie and RS Dunne
Player of the match: NJ Astle (NZ)

- Pakistan won the toss and elected to bat.

== Test series summary ==
=== 1st Test ===
8–12 March 2001
(5-day match)
Scorecard

Pakistan	v	New Zealand
346 (106 overs); Younis Khan 91 (138); DR Tuffey 4/96 (34 overs)		252 (96.4 overs); SP Fleming 86 (239); Saqlain Mushtaq 4/48 (20 overs)
336/5d (103 overs); Younis Khan 149* (182); DR Tuffey 3/43 (17 overs)		131 (59.4 overs); MH Richardson 59 (125); Mohammad Sami 5/36 (15 overs)

Pakistan won by 299 runs
Eden Park, Auckland
Umpires: DB Cowie (NZ) and RB Tiffin (ZIM)
Player of the match: Mohammad Sami (PAK)

- New Zealand won the toss and elected to field.
- JEC Franklin (NZ), and Faisal Iqbal, Imran Farhat, Misbah-ul-Haq, and Mohammad Sami (all PAK) made their Test debuts.

=== 2nd Test ===
15–19 March 2001
(5-day match)
Scorecard

New Zealand	v	Pakistan
476 (156 overs); MS Sinclair 204* (348); Fazl-e-Akbar 3/87 (32 overs)		571/8d (210 overs); Yousuf Youhana 203 (429); DR Tuffey 2/152 (49 overs)
196/1d (73 overs); MH Richardson 73* (219); Younis Khan 1/47 (21 overs)

Match drawn
Jade Stadium, Christchurch
Umpires: DJ Harper (AUS) and DM Quested (NZ)
Player of the match: MS Sinclair (NZ)

- Pakistan won the toss and elected to field.
- CJ Drum (NZ) made his Test debut.

=== 3rd Test ===
27–30 March 2001
(5-day match)
Scorecard

Pakistan	v	New Zealand
104 (26.5 overs); Younis Khan 36 (57); DR Tuffey 4/39 (10.5 overs)		407/4d (112.2 overs); MH Richardson 106 (280); Fazl-e-Akbar 3/85 (27.2 overs)
118 (49.5 overs); Humayun Farhat 26 (35); JEC Franklin 4/26 (9.5 overs)

New Zealand won by an innings and 185 runs
WestpacTrust Park, Hamilton
Umpires: RS Dunne (NZ) and DJ Harper (AUS)
Player of the match: DR Tuffey (NZ)

- New Zealand won the toss and elected to field.
- There was no play on the second day.
- Humayun Farhat (PAK) made his Test debut.
- Craig McMillan (NZ) broke the record for most runs scored in one over in a Test (26). He was surpassed by Brian Lara (28) in 2003.
