= Andrew Penn =

Andrew Penn may refer to:

- Andy Penn (businessman), chief executive officer of Telstra
- Andrew Penn (cricketer) (born 1974), New Zealand cricketer
- Andrew Penn (race walker) (born 1967), British race walker
