= Ervin McSweeney =

New Zealand cricketer (born 1957)

Personal information
- Full name: Ervin Bruce McSweeney
- Born: 8 March 1957 (age 69); Wellington, New Zealand
- Batting: Right-handed
- Role: Wicketkeeper

International information
- National side: New Zealand (1986–1987)
- ODI debut (cap 51): 9 January 1986 v Australia
- Last ODI: 28 March 1987 v West Indies

Career statistics
Competition	ODI	FC	LA
Matches	16	121	101
Runs scored	73	4,947	1,210
Batting average	8.11	33.65	16.80
100s/50s	0/0	6/23	0/4
Top score	18*	205*	69
Catches/stumpings	14/3	340/45	116/31
- Source: Cricinfo, 25 April 2017

Ervin Bruce McSweeney (born 8 March 1957) is a New Zealand cricketer. He played 16 One Day Internationals in the 1980s as a wicketkeeper-batsman.

== International career ==
He toured Zimbabwe with a Young New Zealand team in 1984–85, and with the New Zealand senior team he toured Australia in 1985–86 and Sri Lanka in 1986–87, and played in the Austral-Asia one-day series in Sharjah in 1985–86.

== Domestic career ==
McSweeney played first-class cricket between 1979–80 and 1993-94 for Central Districts and Wellington. His top score was 205 not out for Wellington against Central Districts in 1987–88, when he added 341 for the fifth wicket with Gavin Larsen. He captained Wellington in 1982-83 and 1983–84, and from 1988–89 to 1990–91. He also played for Hawke's Bay in the Hawke Cup.

== After cricket ==
He later became Chief Executive of Cricket Wellington, and announced his resignation from that position on 31 August 2007.
