= Warren Stott =

New Zealand cricketer (born 1946)

Personal information
- Full name: Leslie Warren Stott
- Born: 8 December 1946 (age 79); Rochdale, Lancashire, England
- Batting: Right-handed
- Bowling: Right-arm medium

International information
- National side: New Zealand (1979)
- Only ODI (cap 33): 9 June 1979 v Sri Lanka

Domestic team information
- Years: Team
- 1969/70–1983/84: Auckland

Career statistics
Competition	ODI	FC	LA
Matches	1	63	31
Runs scored	–	591	89
Batting average	–	12.06	6.84
100s/50s	–	0/1	0/0
Top score	–	50*	19*
Balls bowled	12	14,176	1,696
Wickets	3	214	50
Bowling average	16.00	24.95	21.74
5 wickets in innings	0	8	1
10 wickets in match	0	0	0
Best bowling	3/48	6/68	5/44
Catches/stumpings	1/–	36/–	10/–
- Source: Cricinfo, 9 May 2017

Leslie Warren Stott (born 8 December 1946) is an English born former New Zealand cricketer who played one One-Day International for New Zealand in 1979.

In retirement, Stott has worked as a cricket administrator, a commentator and a coach.

== Domestic career ==
Stott was a lower-order right-handed batsman and a medium-paced right-arm bowler who played New Zealand domestic cricket for Auckland for 15 seasons from 1969/70 – 1983/84.

== International career ==
His only taste of international cricket came in the 1979 Cricket World Cup in England. He played in New Zealand's opening match against Sri Lanka and took three wickets in an easy victory. But he lost his place for the remainder of the tournament and did not regain it in subsequent series and seasons.
