= Mfuneko Ngam =

South African cricketer

Cricket information
- Batting: Right-handed
- Bowling: Right-arm fast

International information
- National side: South Africa
- Test debut: 8 December 2000 v New Zealand
- Last Test: 2 January 2001 v Sri Lanka

Career statistics
| Competition | Test | First-class |
|---|---|---|
| Matches | 3 | 46 |
| Runs scored | 0 | 329 |
| Batting average | – | 7.31 |
| 100s/50s | 0/0 | 0/0 |
| Top score | 0* | 35 |
| Balls bowled | 392 | 7,059 |
| Wickets | 11 | 115 |
| Bowling average | 17.18 | 32.08 |
| 5 wickets in innings | 0 | 0 |
| 10 wickets in match | 0 | 0 |
| Best bowling | 3/26 | 4/20 |
| Catches/stumpings | 1/– | 15/– |
- Source: Cricinfo, 13 November 2022

Mfuneko Ngam (born 29 January 1979) is a South African cricketer who played three Tests for South Africa in the 2000–01 season. However, stress fractures in his legs allowed him to play only five first-class matches between January 2001 and October 2003, and after his return he was unable to regain his place in the national team. The cricket news site Cricinfo reported that these injuries may be due to genetic disorders or a dietary deficiency at a young age.

== Playing career ==
A fast bowler, Ngam played his first five first class matches for the Eastern Province B team, but in his third season he was selected for the South Africa A tour of the Caribbean, where the team's co-coach, Shukri Conrad, said he was an "outstanding performer". Three months later, Ngam was called up to the squad in the Third Test against New Zealand in 2000–01, as fast bowler Allan Donald struggled with injury, and he made his debut on 8 December 2000, taking two for 34 in a match cut down to two days by the rain.

A week later, Ngam was offered a Category C contract. He played South Africa's two next Test matches in the home series with Sri Lanka, taking nine wickets before the first of a series of stress fractures struck. When he eventually returned to the South African Test team for a tour of New Zealand in 2003–04, he suffered another stress fracture four days after being called up to the side.

After returning from injury, Ngam moved from Eastern Province (who by now had been renamed the Warriors) to play for the Dolphins, based in neighbouring KwaZulu-Natal. He got 22 wickets for them in the 2004–05 season, his best seasonal haul in first class cricket to that date, but still moved back to the Warriors before the season ending Pro20 Series, and came to the final with that team, but bowled two overs for 40 in the final as the Warriors failed to defend a total of 121. In 2006–07, his last first-class season, he took 16 wickets at 34.00 in eight matches. He played one List A match for Eastern Province in 2007–08.

== Coaching career ==
Post retirement, Ngam runs a cricket academy called Fort Hare Academy in the Eastern Cape town of Alice.
