= Ron Hart =

New Zealand cricketer (born 1961)

Personal information
- Full name: Ronald Terence Hart
- Born: 7 November 1961 (age 65); Lower Hutt, New Zealand
- Batting: Right-handed
- Bowling: Right-arm off-break
- Role: Batsman

International information
- National side: New Zealand
- Only ODI (cap 49): 20 March 1985 v West Indies

Domestic team information
- Years: Team
- 1982/83–1990/91: Central Districts
- 1992/93–1993/94: Wellington

Career statistics
| Competition | ODI | FC | LA |
|---|---|---|---|
| Matches | 1 | 51 | 13 |
| Runs scored | 3 | 2,686 | 361 |
| Batting average | 3.00 | 29.51 | 27.76 |
| 100s/50s | 0/0 | 6/12 | 0/3 |
| Top score | 3 | 207 | 81 |
| Balls bowled | – | 84 | 18 |
| Wickets | – | 0 | 1 |
| Bowling average | – | – | 14.00 |
| 5 wickets in innings | – | – | 0 |
| 10 wickets in match | – | – | 0 |
| Best bowling | – | – | 1/14 |
| Catches/stumpings | 0/– | 30/2 | 1/– |
- Source: Cricinfo, 27 April 2017

Ronald Terence Hart (born 7 November 1961) is a former cricketer who played a single One Day International for New Zealand in 1985. Hart also played for Nelson in the Hawke Cup.
