= Stu Roberts =

New Zealand cricketer (born 1965)

Stuart Roberts
Personal information
- Full name: Stuart James Roberts
- Born: 22 March 1965 (age 61); Christchurch, New Zealand
- Batting: Right-handed
- Bowling: Right-arm fast-medium

International information
- National side: New Zealand
- ODI debut (cap 65): 1 March 1990 v India
- Last ODI: 2 November 1990 v Pakistan

Career statistics
Competition	ODI	FC	LA
Matches	2	63	32
Runs scored	1	629	49
Batting average	–	11.64	6.12
100s/50s	0/0	0/1	0/0
Top score	1*	55	12
Balls bowled	42	10,680	1,373
Wickets	0	203	41
Bowling average	–	29.56	22.53
5 wickets in innings	–	6	1
10 wickets in match	–	0	0
Best bowling	–	5/56	5/39
Catches/stumpings	0/–	16/–	4/–
- Source: Cricinfo, 10 May 2017

Stuart James Roberts (born 22 March 1965) is a former New Zealand cricketer who played two One Day Internationals in 1990.
