= Scott Briasco =

New Zealand cricketer (born 1958)

Peter Scott Briasco (born 14 October 1958) is a former New Zealand cricketer who played for the Central Districts Stags and played for Nelson, Manawatu and Hawke's Bay in the Hawke Cup. He is a former captain and coaching director of the Central Districts Stags cricket team and is a life member of the Central Districts Cricket Association. He was born in Napier.
