= Lance Hamilton =

New Zealand cricketer (born 1973)

Lance John Hamilton
Personal information
- Full name: Lance John Hamilton
- Born: 5 April 1973 (age 53); Papakura, Auckland, New Zealand
- Batting: Right-handed
- Bowling: Left-arm fast-medium

International information
- National side: New Zealand (2005)
- ODI debut (cap 141): 1 March 2005 v Australia
- Last ODI: 5 March 2005 v Australia

Domestic team information
- Years: Team
- 1996/97–2006/07: Central Districts

Career statistics
Competition	ODI	FC	LA	T20
Matches	2	60	65	2
Runs scored	3	266	76	14
Batting average	–	4.83	4.75	7.00
100s/50s	0/0	0/0	0/0	0/0
Top score	2*	23	12*	10
Balls bowled	108	11,507	3,294	46
Wickets	1	212	86	2
Bowling average	143.00	25.42	27.69	25.00
5 wickets in innings	0	8	1	0
10 wickets in match	0	0	0	0
Best bowling	1/76	6/32	5/19	1/17
Catches/stumpings	0/–	15/0	10/0	0/0
- Source: Cricinfo, 8 November 2026

Lance John Hamilton (born 5 April 1973) is a former New Zealand cricketer. He has been chief executive officer of Central Districts Cricket since May 2022.

== Career ==
Hamilton was born in Papakura. He represented Counties and played under-age cricket for Northern Districts before moving to Napier in 1996 in search of greater opportunities in cricket.

A left-arm fast-medium bowler, Hamilton played first-class cricket for Central Districts from 1996–97 to 2006–07.

He made his ODI debut in the 2005 series against Australia from 1 to 5 March 2005.
