= Mark Douglas (cricketer) =

New Zealand cricketer (born 1968)

Personal information
- Full name: Mark William Douglas
- Born: 20 October 1968 (age 58); Nelson, New Zealand
- Batting: Left-handed
- Role: Batsman

International information
- National side: New Zealand (1994–1995)
- ODI debut (cap 89): 16 April 1994 v Australia
- Last ODI: 26 February 1995 v Australia

Domestic team information
- Years: Team
- 1987/88–1992/93: Central Districts
- 1993/94–1994/95: Wellington
- 1995/96–2000/01: Central Districts

Career statistics
Competition	ODI	FC	LA
Matches	6	94	115
Runs scored	55	4,808	2,517
Batting average	9.16	35.09	24.67
100s/50s	0/0	9/29	3/10
Top score	30	144	121
Balls bowled	–	72	6
Wickets	–	4	0
Bowling average	–	30.00	–
5 wickets in innings	–	0	–
10 wickets in match	–	0	–
Best bowling	–	2/29	–
Catches/stumpings	2/–	82/–	51/5
- Source: Cricinfo, 19 April 2017

Mark William Douglas (born 20 October 1968) is a former international cricketer. Born in Nelson, New Zealand, Douglas played six One Day Internationals for New Zealand. He also played for Nelson in the Hawke Cup.
