= Vaughan Brown =

New Zealand cricketer

Personal information
- Full name: Vaughan Raymond Brown
- Born: 3 November 1959 (age 67); Christchurch, Canterbury, New Zealand
- Batting: Left-handed
- Bowling: Right-arm offbreak

International information
- National side: New Zealand (1985–1988)
- Test debut (cap 156): 8 November 1985 v Australia
- Last Test: 22 November 1985 v Australia
- ODI debut (cap 59): 17 January 1988 v Australia
- Last ODI: 22 January 1988 v Australia

Career statistics
Competition	Test	ODI	FC	LA
Matches	2	3	83	52
Runs scored	51	44	3,485	799
Batting average	25.50	14.66	29.28	19.48
100s/50s	0/0	0/0	6/19	0/2
Top score	36*	32	161*	65
Balls bowled	342	66	13,101	1,065
Wickets	1	1	190	25
Bowling average	176.00	75.00	28.97	42.60
5 wickets in innings	0	0	4	0
10 wickets in match	0	0	2	0
Best bowling	1/17	1/24	7/28	2/18
Catches/stumpings	3/–	2/–	49/–	18/–
- Source: Cricinfo, 4 February 2017

Vaughan Raymond Brown (born 3 November 1959) is a former New Zealand cricketer who played in two Test matches and three One Day Internationals during the mid-1980s.

== Domestic career ==
Brown was a left-handed middle order batsman and a right-arm off-break bowler. In a first-class career spanning from 1978 to 1989, he played 83 matches for Canterbury and Auckland and took 190 wickets. He was the first recipient of the New Zealand Cricket Council's Young Player to Lord's scholarship, in 1979, but his tenure there was cut short due to an injury sustained in a car accident.

In the early 1980s, Brown figured highly in both the batting and bowling averages in New Zealand domestic cricket. In 1982–83, he was second to Richard Hadlee in the national bowling averages.

== International career ==
He was picked for the Young New Zealand tour of Zimbabwe in 1984 and the following year he went with the full Test team to Australia. Selected for the first Test at Brisbane, he batted steadily at No 7, took the one wicket that Hadlee did not take in Australia's first innings collapse and held three catches as New Zealand recorded their first-ever victory in Australia by a margin of an innings and 41 runs. But he had no success on a spinner's wicket in the second Test at Sydney and was dropped for the subsequent matches.

Brown never regained his Test place, but in 1988 he was picked for the New Zealand team that contested the World Series ODIs, again in Australia. This time there was little success for either Brown or the team, with all three matches lost. He retired from regular cricket after this season, though he appeared in one further first-class match in 1989/90.
