= List of New Zealand ODI cricketers =

This is a list of New Zealand One-day International cricketers. A One Day International, or an ODI, is an international cricket match between two representative teams, each having ODI status, as determined by the International Cricket Council (ICC). An ODI differs from Test matches in that the number of overs per team is limited, and that each team has only one innings. The list is arranged in the order in which each player won his first ODI cap. Where more than one player won his first ODI cap in the same match, those players are listed alphabetically by surname.

== Key ==
General

- ‡ – Captain
- † – Wicket-keeper
- First – Year of debut
- Last – Year of latest game
- Mat – Number of matches played

Batting

- Runs – Runs scored in career
- HS – Highest score
- Avg – Runs scored per dismissal
- * – Batsman remained not out
- 50 – Half-centuries scored
- 100 – Centuries scored

Bowling

- Balls – Balls bowled in career
- Wkt – Wickets taken in career
- BBI – Best bowling in an innings
- Ave – Average runs per wicket
- 5WI – Five wickets or more in a match

Fielding

- Ca – Catches taken
- St – Stumpings taken

== Players ==
Statistics are correct as of 18 January 2026.

New Zealand ODI cricketers
General					Batting					Bowling					Fielding	
Cap	Name	First	Last	Mat	Runs	HS	Avg	50	100	Balls	Wkt	BBI	Ave	5WI	Ca	St
1	Mark Burgess	1973	1981	26	336	47	16.80	0	0	74	1	1/10	69.00	0	8	—
2	Richard Collinge	1973	1978	15	34	9	5.66	0	0	859	18	5/23	26.61	1	1	—
3	Peter Coman	1973	1974	3	62	38	20.66	0	0	—	—	—	—	—	2	—
4	Bevan Congdon	1973	1978	11	338	101	56.33	2	1	437	7	2/17	41.00	0	0	—
5	Dayle Hadlee	1973	1976	11	40	20	8.00	0	0	628	20	4/34	18.20	0	2	—
6	Richard Hadlee	1973	1990	115	1751	79	21.61	4	0	6182	158	5/25	21.56	5	27	—
7	Brian Hastings	1973	1975	11	151	37	18.87	0	0	—	—	—	—	—	4	—
8	Hedley Howarth	1973	1975	9	18	11	6.00	0	0	492	11	3/29	25.45	0	3	—
9	Glenn Turner	1973	1983	41	1598	171*	47.00	9	3	6	0	—	—	—	13	—
10	Graham Vivian	1973	1973	1	14	14	14.00	0	0	—	—	—	—	—	0	—
11	Ken Wadsworth	1973	1976	13	258	104	28.66	0	1	—	—	—	—	—	13	2
12	Vic Pollard	1973	1974	3	67	55	33.50	1	0	—	—	—	—	—	1	—
13	Rodney Redmond	1973	1973	2	3	3	3.00	0	0	—	—	—	—	—	0	—
14	Bruce Taylor	1973	1973	2	22	22	22.00	0	0	114	4	3/25	15.50	0	1	—
15	Lance Cairns	1974	1985	78	987	60	16.72	2	0	4015	89	5/28	30.52	1	19	—
16	David O'Sullivan	1974	1976	3	2	1*	2.00	0	0	168	2	1/38	61.50	0	0	—
17	John Parker	1974	1981	24	248	66	12.40	1	0	16	1	1/10	10.00	0	11	1
18	Barry Hadlee	1975	1975	2	26	19	26.00	0	0	—	—	—	—	—	0	—
19	Geoff Howarth	1975	1985	70	1384	76	23.06	6	0	90	3	1/4	22.66	0	16	—
20	John Morrison	1975	1983	18	252	55	21.00	1	0	283	8	3/24	24.87	0	6	—
21	Brian McKechnie	1975	1981	14	54	27	13.50	0	0	818	19	3/23	26.05	0	2	—
22	Graham Edwards	1976	1981	6	138	41	23.00	0	0	6	1	1/5	5.00	0	5	—
23	Robert Anderson	1976	1978	2	16	12	16.00	0	0	—	—	—	—	—	1	—
24	Norman Parker	1976	1976	1	—	—	—	—	—	—	—	—	—	—	1	—
25	Andrew Roberts	1976	1976	1	16	16	16.00	0	0	56	1	1/30	30.00	0	1	—
26	Gary Troup	1976	1985	22	101	39	25.25	0	0	1180	32	4/19	24.71	0	2	—
27	Stephen Boock	1978	1987	14	30	12	10.00	0	0	700	15	3/28	34.20	0	5	—
28	John Wright	1978	1992	149	3891	101	26.46	24	1	24	0	—	—	—	51	—
29	Brendon Bracewell	1978	1978	1	—	—	—	—	—	66	1	1/41	41.00	0	0	—
30	Bruce Edgar	1978	1986	64	1814	102*	30.74	10	1	12	0	—	—	—	12	—
31	Jeremy Coney	1979	1987	88	1874	66*	30.72	8	0	2931	54	4/46	37.75	0	40	—
32	Warren Lees	1979	1983	31	215	26	11.31	0	0	—	—	—	—	—	28	2
33	Warren Stott	1979	1979	1	—	—	—	—	—	72	3	3/48	16.00	0	1	—
34	Ewen Chatfield	1979	1989	114	118	19*	10.72	0	0	6065	140	5/34	25.84	1	19	—
35	Paul McEwan	1980	1985	17	204	41	13.60	0	0	420	6	2/29	58.83	0	1	—
36	John Fulton Reid	1980	1986	25	633	88	27.52	4	0	—	—	—	—	—	5	—
37	Martin Snedden	1980	1990	93	535	64	15.28	1	0	4525	114	4/34	28.39	0	19	—
38	Ian Smith	1980	1992	98	1055	62*	17.29	3	0	—	—	—	—	—	81	5
39	Gary Robertson	1981	1989	10	49	17	8.16	0	0	498	6	2/29	53.50	0	2	—
40	Martin Crowe	1982	1995	143	4704	107*	38.55	34	4	1296	29	2/9	32.89	0	66	—
41	Bruce Blair	1982	1986	14	174	29*	14.50	0	0	30	1	1/7	34.00	1	4	—
42	Jeff Crowe	1983	1990	75	1518	88*	25.72	7	0	6	0	—	—	—	28	—
43	Peter Webb	1983	1984	5	38	10*	9.50	0	0	—	—	—	—	—	3	—
44	Richard Webb	1983	1983	3	6	6*	—	0	0	161	4	2/28	26.25	0	0	—
45	Trevor Franklin	1983	1988	3	27	21	9.00	0	0	—	—	—	—	—	0	—
46	John Bracewell	1983	1990	53	512	43	16.51	0	0	2447	33	2/3	57.09	0	19	—
47	Derek Stirling	1984	1984	6	21	13*	7.00	0	0	246	6	2/29	34.50	0	3	—
48	Evan Gray	1984	1988	10	98	38	16.33	0	0	386	8	2/26	35.75	0	3	—
49	Ron Hart	1985	1985	1	3	3	3.00	0	0	—	—	—	—	—	0	—
50	Ken Rutherford	1985	1995	121	3143	108	29.65	18	2	389	10	2/39	32.30	0	41	—
51	Ervin McSweeney	1986	1987	16	73	18*	8.11	0	0	—	—	—	—	—	14	3
52	Stu Gillespie	1986	1988	19	70	18*	11.66	0	0	963	23	4/30	32.00	0	7	—
53	Tony Blain	1986	1994	38	442	49*	16.37	0	0	—	—	—	—	—	37	1
54	Willie Watson	1986	1994	61	86	21	7.81	0	0	3251	74	4/27	30.36	0	9	—
55	Phil Horne	1987	1987	4	50	18	12.50	0	0	—	—	—	—	—	0	—
56	Dipak Patel	1987	1997	75	623	71	11.75	1	0	3251	45	3/22	50.24	0	23	—
57	Andrew Jones	1987	1995	87	2784	93	35.69	25	0	306	4	2/42	54.00	0	23	—
58	Danny Morrison	1987	1996	96	171	20*	9.00	0	0	4586	126	5/34	27.53	2	19	—
59	Vaughan Brown	1988	1988	3	44	32	14.66	0	0	66	1	1/24	75.00	0	2	—
60	Mark Greatbatch	1988	1996	84	2206	111	28.28	13	2	6	0	—	—	—	35	—
61	Chris Kuggeleijn	1988	1989	16	142	40	15.77	0	0	817	12	2/31	50.33	0	9	—
62	Richard Reid	1988	1991	9	248	64	27.55	2	0	7	1	1/13	13.00	0	3	—
63	Robert Vance	1988	1989	8	248	96	31.00	1	0	—	—	—	—	—	4	—
64	Gavin Larsen	1990	1999	121	629	37	14.62	0	0	6368	113	4/24	35.39	0	23	—
65	Stu Roberts	1990	1990	2	1	1*	—	0	0	252	0	—	—	—	0	—
66	Shane Thomson	1990	1996	56	964	83	22.95	5	0	2121	42	3/14	38.14	0	18	—
67	Jonathan Millmow	1990	1990	5	—	—	—	—	—	270	4	2/22	58.00	0	1	—
68	Mark Priest	1990	1998	18	103	24	10.30	0	0	752	8	2/27	73.75	0	2	—
69	Chris Pringle	1990	1995	64	193	34*	8.77	0	0	3314	103	5/45	23.87	1	7	—
70	David White	1990	1990	3	37	15	12.33	0	0	—	—	—	—	—	1	—
71	Grant Bradburn	1990	2001	11	60	30	8.57	0	0	385	6	2/18	53.00	0	2	—
72	Chris Harris	1990	2004	250	4379	130	29.00	16	1	10667	203	5/42	37.50	1	96	—
73	Richard Petrie	1990	1991	12	65	21	13.00	0	0	660	12	2/25	37.41	0	2	—
74	Rod Latham	1990	1994	33	583	60	20.10	1	0	450	11	5/32	35.09	1	11	—
75	Bryan Young	1990	1999	74	1668	74	24.52	9	0	—	—	—	—	—	28	—
76	Chris Cairns^{1}	1991	2006	214	4881	115	29.22	25	4	8132	200	5/42	32.78	1	66	—
77	Murphy Su'a	1992	1995	12	24	12*	4.80	0	0	463	9	4/59	40.77	0	1	—
78	Simon Doull	1992	2000	42	172	22	12.28	0	0	1745	36	4/25	40.52	0	10	—
79	Dion Nash	1992	2002	81	624	42	15.60	0	0	3416	64	4/38	40.96	0	25	—
80	Adam Parore	1992	2002	179	3314	108	25.68	14	1	—	—	—	—	—	116	25
81	Blair Hartland	1992	1994	16	311	68*	20.73	2	0	—	—	—	—	—	5	—
82	Justin Vaughan	1992	1996	18	162	33	18.00	0	0	696	15	4/33	34.93	0	4	—
83	Mark Haslam	1992	1992	1	9	9	9.00	0	0	30	1	1/28	28.00	0	0	—
84	Michael Owens	1992	1992	1	—	—	—	—	—	48	0	—	—	—	0	—
85	Jeff Wilson	1993	2005	6	103	44*	20.60	0	0	242	4	2/21	65.00	0	4	—
86	Richard de Groen	1993	1994	12	12	7*	2.40	0	0	549	8	2/34	59.75	0	2	—
87	Matthew Hart	1994	2002	13	61	16	7.62	0	0	572	13	5/22	28.69	1	7	—
88	Stephen Fleming^{1}	1994	2007	279	8007	134*	32.41	49	8	29	1	1/8	28.00	0	130	—
89	Mark Douglas	1994	1995	6	55	30	9.16	0	0	—	—	—	—	—	2	—
90	Heath Davis	1994	1997	11	13	7*	6.50	0	0	432	11	4/35	39.63	0	2	—
91	Darrin Murray	1994	1994	1	3	3	3.00	0	0	—	—	—	—	—	0	—
92	Lee Germon	1994	1997	37	519	89	19.96	3	0	—	—	—	—	—	21	9
93	Nathan Astle	1995	2007	223	7090	145*	34.92	41	16	4850	99	4/43	38.47	0	83	—
94	Roydon Hayes	1995	1995	1	13	13	13.00	0	0	252	0	—	—	—	0	—
95	Roger Twose	1995	2001	87	2717	103	38.81	20	1	272	4	2/31	58.75	0	37	—
96	Craig Spearman	1995	2001	51	936	86	18.72	5	0	18	0	—	—	—	15	—
97	Robert Kennedy	1996	1996	7	17	8*	17.00	0	0	312	5	2/36	56.60	0	1	—
98	Geoff Allott	1997	2000	31	17	7*	3.40	0	0	1528	52	4/35	23.21	0	5	—
99	Matthew Horne	1997	2002	50	980	74	20.41	5	0	—	—	—	—	—	12	—
100	Daniel Vettori^{1}	1997	2015	291	2201	83	17.19	4	0	13820	297	5/7	31.97	2	86	—
101	Andrew Penn	1997	2001	5	23	15	11.50	0	0	159	1	1/50	201.00	0	1	—
102	Craig McMillan	1997	2007	197	4707	117	28.18	28	3	1879	49	3/20	35.04	0	44	—
103	Shayne O'Connor	1997	2000	38	24	8	3.42	0	0	1487	46	5/39	30.34	2	11	—
104	Llorne Howell	1998	1998	12	287	68	23.91	4	0	—	—	—	—	—	2	—
105	Paul Wiseman	1998	2003	15	45	16	22.50	0	0	450	12	4/45	30.66	0	2	—
106	Mark Bailey	1998	1998	1	—	—	—	—	—	—	—	—	—	—	0	—
107	Matthew Bell	1998	2001	7	133	66	19.00	1	0	—	—	—	—	—	1	—
108	Alex Tait	1998	1999	5	35	13*	11.66	0	0	120	3	2/37	29.33	0	0	—
109	Chris Drum	1999	1999	5	9	7*	—	0	0	216	4	2/31	65.25	0	1	—
110	Carl Bulfin	1999	1999	4	9	7*	9.00	0	0	102	0	—	—	—	1	—
111	Scott Styris	1999	2011	188	4483	141	32.48	28	4	6114	137	6/25	35.32	1	73	—
112	Warren Wisneski	2000	2000	3	10	6	10.00	0	0	114	0	—	—	—	1	—
113	Mathew Sinclair	2000	2009	54	1304	118*	28.34	8	2	—	—	—	—	—	17	—
114	Chris Nevin	2000	2003	37	732	74	20.33	4	0	—	—	—	—	—	16	3
115	Glen Sulzberger	2000	2000	3	9	6*	9.00	0	0	132	3	1/28	34.00	0	0	—
116	Daryl Tuffey	2000	2010	94	295	36	9.51	0	0	4333	110	4/24	35.12	0	20	—
117	Brooke Walker	2000	2002	11	47	16*	15.66	0	0	438	8	2/43	52.12	0	5	—
118	James Franklin	2001	2013	110	1270	98*	23.96	4	0	3848	81	5/42	41.40	1	26	—
119	Chris Martin	2001	2009	20	8	3	1.60	0	0	948	18	3/62	44.66	0	7	—
120	Jacob Oram	2001	2012	160	2434	101*	24.09	13	1	6911	173	5/26	29.17	2	51	—
121	Lou Vincent	2001	2007	102	2413	172	27.11	11	3	20	1	1/0	25.00	0	41	—
122	Andre Adams	2001	2007	42	419	45	17.45	0	0	1885	53	5/22	31.00	1	8	—
123	Kyle Mills	2001	2015	170	1047	54	15.62	2	0	8230	240	5/25	27.02	1	42	—
124	Shane Bond	2002	2010	82	292	31*	16.22	0	0	4295	147	6/19	20.88	4	15	—
125	Mark Richardson	2002	2002	4	42	26	10.50	0	0	—	—	—	—	—	1	—
126	Brendon McCullum	2002	2016	260	6083	166	30.41	32	5	—	—	—	—	—	262	15
127	Ian Butler	2002	2010	26	84	25	10.50	0	0	1109	28	3/41	37.07	0	8	—
128	Robbie Hart	2002	2002	2	0	0	0.00	0	0	—	—	—	—	—	1	—
129	Paul Hitchcock	2002	2008	14	41	11*	10.25	0	0	558	12	3/30	39.00	0	4	—
130	Craig Cumming	2003	2005	13	161	45*	13.41	0	0	18	0	—	—	—	6	—
131	Richard Jones	2003	2003	5	168	63	33.60	1	0	—	—	—	—	—	0	—
132	Hamish Marshall	2003	2007	66	1454	101*	27.43	12	1	—	—	—	—	—	18	—
133	Michael Mason	2003	2010	26	24	13*	8.00	0	0	1179	31	4/24	33.03	0	4	—
134	Matthew Walker	2003	2003	3	10	10	10.00	0	0	132	4	4/49	29.75	0	2	—
135	Kerry Walmsley	2003	2003	2	—	—	—	—	—	120	2	1/53	58.50	0	1	—
136	Tama Canning	2003	2005	4	52	23*	17.33	0	0	204	5	2/30	40.60	0	1	—
137	Michael Papps	2004	2005	6	207	92*	51.75	2	0	—	—	—	—	—	1	—
138	Gareth Hopkins	2004	2010	25	236	45	14.75	0	0	—	—	—	—	—	27	1
139	Peter Fulton	2004	2009	49	1334	112	32.53	8	1	—	—	—	—	—	18	—
140	James Marshall	2005	2008	10	250	161	25.00	1	1	—	—	—	—	—	0	—
141	Lance Hamilton	2005	2005	2	3	2*	—	0	0	108	1	1/76	143.00	0	0	—
142	Jeetan Patel	2005	2017	43	95	34	13.57	0	0	2014	49	3/11	34.51	0	13	—
143	Jamie How	2005	2011	41	1046	139	29.05	7	1	—	—	—	—	—	19	—
144	Ross Taylor	2006	2022	236	8607	181*	47.55	51	21	42	0	—	—	—	142	—
145	Mark Gillespie	2006	2009	32	93	28	15.50	0	0	1521	37	4/58	37.00	0	6	—
146	Jesse Ryder	2008	2014	48	1362	107	33.21	6	3	407	12	3/29	34.33	0	15	—
147	Iain O'Brien	2008	2009	10	3	3*	—	0	0	453	14	3/68	34.85	0	1	—
148	Daniel Flynn	2008	2012	20	228	35	15.20	0	0	24	0	—	—	—	4	—
149	Tim Southee	2008	2023	161	740	55	12.13	1	0	8075	221	7/33	33.70	3	44	—
150	Grant Elliott	2008	2016	83	1976	115	34.06	11	2	1302	39	4/31	30.23	0	17	—
151	Neil Broom	2009	2017	39	943	109*	26.94	5	1	—	—	—	—	—	9	—
152	Martin Guptill	2009	2022	198	7346	237*	41.73	39	18	109	4	2/6	24.50	0	104	—
153	Brendon Diamanti	2009	2009	1	26	26*	—	0	0	12	0	—	—	—	1	—
154	Peter McGlashan	2009	2009	4	63	56*	63.00	1	0	—	—	—	—	—	0	—
155	Ewen Thompson	2009	2009	1	—	—	—	—	—	24	0	—	—	—	0	—
156	Nathan McCullum	2009	2015	84	1070	65	20.98	4	0	3536	63	3/24	46.92	0	41	—
157	Aaron Redmond	2009	2010	6	152	52	25.33	1	0	—	—	—	—	—	3	—
158	Peter Ingram	2010	2010	8	193	69	27.57	1	0	—	—	—	—	—	3	—
159	Andy McKay	2010	2012	19	12	4*	4.00	0	0	926	27	4/53	29.62	0	3	—
160	Shanan Stewart	2010	2012	4	26	14	6.50	0	0	—	—	—	—	—	0	—
161	Kane Williamson	2010	2025	175	7256	148	48.69	47	15	1467	37	4/22	35.40	0	76	—
162	BJ Watling	2010	2018	28	573	96*	24.91	5	0	—	—	—	—	—	20	0
163	Hamish Bennett	2010	2020	19	10	4*	5.00	0	0	892	33	4/16	24.84	0	3	—
164	Luke Woodcock	2011	2011	4	14	11	14.00	0	0	164	3	2/58	51.66	0	0	—
165	Doug Bracewell	2011	2022	21	221	57	18.41	1	0	1016	26	4/55	32.50	0	5	—
166	Rob Nicol	2011	2013	22	586	146	30.84	2	2	339	10	4/19	32.90	0	11	—
167	Graeme Aldridge	2011	2011	2	—	—	—	—	—	114	1	1/45	98.00	0	0	—
168	Dean Brownlie	2011	2017	16	361	63	25.78	1	0	—	—	—	—	—	6	—
169	Andrew Ellis	2012	2013	5	25	16	8.33	0	0	480	12	2/22	35.41	0	3	—
170	Tom Latham	2012	2025	163	4464	145*	34.07	26	8	—	—	—	—	—	142	17
171	Tarun Nethula	2012	2012	5	12	9*	6.00	0	0	264	5	2/41	49.80	0	2	—
172	Michael Bates	2012	2012	2	13	13	13.00	0	0	84	2	1/24	26.00	0	1	—
173	Colin de Grandhomme	2012	2022	45	742	74*	26.50	4	0	1548	30	3/26	41.00	0	17	—
174	Trent Boult	2012	2023	114	216	21*	9.00	0	0	6180	211	7/34	24.38	6	43	—
175	Adam Milne	2012	2024	50	180	36	12.85	0	0	2242	57	4/34	35.56	0	23	—
176	Mitchell McClenaghan	2013	2016	48	108	34*	27.00	0	0	2336	82	5/58	28.20	1	4	—
177	James Neesham	2013	2023	76	1495	97*	28.20	7	0	2448	71	5/27	36.00	2	27	—
178	Colin Munro	2013	2019	57	1271	87	24.92	8	0	552	7	2/10	68.71	0	22	—
179	Hamish Rutherford	2013	2013	4	15	11	3.75	0	0	—	—	—	—	—	2	—
180	Luke Ronchi^{2}	2013	2017	81	1321	170*	23.17	3	1	—	—	—	—	—	100	10
181	Corey Anderson	2013	2017	49	1109	131*	27.72	4	1	1485	60	5/63	25.03	1	11	—
182	Anton Devcich	2013	2016	12	195	58	17.72	1	0	324	4	2/33	72.75	0	3	—
183	Matt Henry	2014	2025	95	270	48*	10.38	0	0	4946	172	5/30	24.98	3	32	—
184	Mitchell Santner	2015	2025	124	1580	67	26.77	3	0	5875	133	5/50	35.46	2	53	—
185	Ben Wheeler	2015	2015	6	58	39*	—	0	0	366	8	3/63	39.37	0	1	—
186	Andrew Mathieson	2015	2015	1	0	0*	—	0	0	24	1	1/40	40.00	0	0	—
187	Ish Sodhi	2015	2024	54	210	35	9.54	0	0	2557	64	6/39	36.71	1	14	—
188	George Worker	2015	2018	10	272	58	34.00	3	0	6	0	—	—	—	5	—
189	Henry Nicholls	2015	2026	84	2252	124*	34.12	16	1	—	—	—	—	—	33	—
190	Lockie Ferguson	2016	2023	65	122	19	7.17	0	0	3300	99	5/45	31.55	1	14	—
191	Scott Kuggeleijn	2017	2017	2	11	11*	—	0	0	84	5	3/41	11.60	0	0	—
192	Seth Rance	2017	2017	2	—	—	—	—	—	105	1	1/44	110.00	0	3	—
193	Todd Astle	2017	2019	9	79	49	26.33	0	0	270	10	3/33	24.60	0	2	—
194	Mark Chapman^{3}	2018	2025	30	781	132	33.95	4	2	—	—	—	—	—	7	—
195	Tim Seifert	2019	2025	4	59	26	19.66	0	0	—	—	—	—	—	10	1
196	Tom Blundell	2020	2023	12	266	68	29.55	2	0	—	—	—	—	—	13	2
197	Kyle Jamieson	2020	2026	23	101	25*	25.25	0	0	1108	30	4/41	32.66	0	4	—
198	Devon Conway	2021	2026	43	1692	152*	43.38	5	6	—	—	—	—	—	20	—
199	Daryl Mitchell	2021	2026	59	2690	137	58.47	12	9	339	14	3/25	23.92	0	41	—
200	Will Young	2021	2026	55	1823	120	36.46	11	4	—	—	—	—	—	30	—
201	Michael Bracewell	2022	2026	43	956	140	37.76	3	2	1680	38	4/26	36.18	0	33	—
202	Blair Tickner	2022	2025	16	34	18	17.00	0	0	767	25	4/34	33.52	0	6	—
203	Finn Allen	2022	2023	22	582	96	27.71	5	0	—	—	—	—	—	9	—
204	Glenn Phillips	2022	2026	47	1262	106*	42.06	5	2	816	16	3/37	51.56	0	29	—
205	Jacob Duffy	2022	2025	19	12	4*	12.00	0	0	862	35	3/35	24.25	0	4	—
206	Dane Cleaver	2022	2022	1	32	32	32.00	0	0	—	—	—	—	—	2	—
207	Henry Shipley	2023	2023	8	18	7	3.60	0	0	387	15	5/31	23.93	1	2	—
208	Chad Bowes	2023	2023	6	99	51	16.50	1	0	—	—	—	—	—	4	—
209	Rachin Ravindra	2023	2025	39	1424	123*	41.88	6	5	979	21	4/60	45.28	0	14	—
210	Cole McConchie	2023	2023	6	126	64*	42.00	1	0	168	4	2/18	33.75	0	3	—
211	Ben Lister	2023	2023	3	10	5*	10.00	0	0	156	4	3/69	39.50	0	0	—
212	Dean Foxcroft	2023	2023	1	0	0	0.00	0	0	—	—	—	—	—	0	—
213	Josh Clarkson	2023	2023	3	17	16	8.50	0	0	72	3	2/24	24.33	0	1	—
214	William O'Rourke	2023	2025	17	6	3*	3.00	0	0	844	22	3/43	36.27	0	4	—
215	Adithya Ashok	2023	2026	3	10	10	10.00	0	0	97	2	1/55	60.00	0	1	—
216	Mitchell Hay	2024	2026	10	186	99*	31.00	1	0	—	—	—	—	—	14	—
217	Tim Robinson	2024	2024	3	48	35	16.00	0	0	—	—	—	—	—	0	—
218	Nathan Smith	2025	2025	14	43	17	6.14	0	0	523	18	4/42	32.50	0	7	—
219	Zak Foulkes	2024	2026	9	49	22*	24.50	0	0	361	13	4/41	25.92	0	3	—
220	Ben Sears	2025	2025	4	11	6	11.00	0	0	206	10	5/34	19.70	2	1	—
221	Muhammad Abbas	2025	2025	3	104	52	34.66	1	0	60	2	1/16	29.50	0	1	—
222	Nick Kelly	2025	2025	3	49	31	16.33	0	0	—	—	—	—	—	0	—
223	Rhys Mariu	2025	2025	2	76	58	38.00	1	0	—	—	—	—	—	0	—
224	Kristian Clarke	2026	2026	3	35	24*	35.00	0	0	162	7	3/54	26.14	0	2	—
225	Jayden Lennox	2026	2026	2	—	—	—	—	—	120	3	2/42	28.00	0	0	—

Notes:

- ^{1} Chris Cairns, Stephen Fleming and Daniel Vettori also played ODI cricket for ICC World XI. Only their records for New Zealand are given above.
- ^{2} Luke Ronchi also played ODI cricket for Australia. Only his records for New Zealand are given above.
- ^{3} Mark Chapman also played ODI cricket for Hong Kong. Only his records for New Zealand are given above.

== See also ==
- One Day International
- New Zealand cricket team
- List of New Zealand Test cricketers
- List of New Zealand Twenty20 International cricketers
- List of New Zealand sportspeople
