= Roydon Hayes =

New Zealand cricketer (born 1971)

Personal information
- Full name: Roydon Leslie Hayes
- Born: 9 May 1971 (age 55); Paeroa, Waikato, New Zealand
- Batting: Right-handed
- Bowling: Right-arm fast

International information
- National side: New Zealand
- Only ODI (cap 94): 28 January 1995 v West Indies

Career statistics
Competition	ODI	FC	LA
Matches	1	33	29
Runs scored	13	109	62
Batting average	13.00	4.95	4.76
100s/50s	0/0	0/0	0/0
Top score	13	33*	33*
Balls bowled	42	5,939	1,505
Wickets	0	91	37
Bowling average	–	28.13	32.13
5 wickets in innings	–	0	0
10 wickets in match	–	0	0
Best bowling	–	4/41	4/34
Catches/stumpings	0/–	4/–	7/–
- Source: Cricinfo, 10 May 2017

Roydon Leslie Hayes (born 9 May 1971) is a former New Zealand cricketer who played one One Day International in 1995.
