= Dannevirke Domain =

Cricket ground in Dannevirke, New Zealand

Coordinates: 40°12′28.00″S 176°06′32.57″E

- Interactive map of Dannevirke Domain

Ground information
- Location: Dannevirke, New Zealand
- Country: New Zealand
- Establishment: 1904 (first recorded match)

Team information
Central Districts	(1993)
- As of 2 November 2011; Source: Ground profile

Dannevirke Domain is a park of about 20 hectares on the eastern fringe of the town of Dannevirke, Hawke's Bay, New Zealand. Among its recreational facilities it includes a cricket ground.

The first recorded cricket match held at Dannevirke Domain was in January 1904, between teams from Waipukurau and Dannevirke, but the park was in use for sports for some years before then. The first interprovincial cricket match on the ground came in March 1921 when Southern Hawke's Bay played Manawatu. Between the 1920s and the 1980s, when Southern Hawke's Bay competed in interprovincial matches including the Hawke Cup, Dannevirke Domain was the team's home ground.

The ground held a single List A match in the 1992-93 Shell Cup when Central Districts played Otago, which resulted in a victory for Otago by 16 runs.
