= Heath Davis =

New Zealand cricketer

Personal information
- Full name: Heath Te-Ihi-O-Te-Rangi Davis
- Born: 30 November 1971 (age 54); Lower Hutt, Wellington, New Zealand
- Batting: Right-handed
- Bowling: Right-arm fast

International information
- National side: New Zealand (1994–1997)
- Test debut (cap 189): 2 June 1994 v England
- Last Test: 18 September 1997 v Zimbabwe
- ODI debut (cap 90): 18 April 1994 v Sri Lanka
- Last ODI: 14 May 1997 v India

Career statistics
Competition	Test	ODI	FC	LA
Matches	5	11	71	47
Runs scored	20	13	538	140
Batting average	6.66	6.50	11.44	12.72
100s/50s	0/0	0/0	0/0	0/0
Top score	8*	7*	38*	21
Balls bowled	1,010	432	11,682	1,998
Wickets	17	11	215	45
Bowling average	29.35	39.63	31.13	36.80
5 wickets in innings	1	0	6	0
10 wickets in match	0	0	0	0
Best bowling	5/63	4/35	5/32	4/35
Catches/stumpings	4/–	2/–	26/–	12/–
- Source: Cricinfo, 4 May 2017

Heath Te-Ihi-O-Te-Rangi Davis (born 30 November 1971) is a former New Zealand cricketer. He played five Test matches and eleven One Day Internationals in the 1990s. He played his provincial cricket for Wellington.

== Early and personal life ==
Davis was born on 30 November 1971 at Hutt Hospital, and spent his early years in the greater Wellington region before he moved with his family to Australia whilst he was in primary school.

In 2022, Davis came out as gay – making him the first former Black Cap to publicly disclose his homosexuality.

== Cricket career ==
Davis was prevented from enjoying a longer international career by problems with injury, wides and, particularly no-balls. A quick and skiddy bowler, his impressive Test figures hide the story of up to 14 no-balls in an innings.

Davis was selected on the 1994 New Zealand tour of England. He was not expected to play any of Test matches but to "gain experience and take advantage of the opportunity to play or train every day". Geoff Howarth said of him "We knew he could bowl fast, but he had problems with his direction and no-balling". Ken Rutherford said "I soon learnt he had a lot of raw talent but very little cricketing nous". Due to injuries, he played in the first Test where New Zealand lost to England by an innings and 90 runs and he bowled 21 overs and took 1 wicket for 93 runs. His first ball in Test cricket went for four wides.

His career came in two short bursts, in between which he strove for improved rhythm. He tended to lose control when he strove for extra pace. He played both Test matches in the 1997 Sri Lankan tour of New Zealand taking four wickets in the first Test and five wickets for 63 runs in the first innings of second Test. His final Test match was played in Harare against Zimbabwe where he took 4 wickets but continued to be troubled by no balls, bowling 24 of them in the match.

Davis moved to Brisbane, Australia in 2003 and he is involved with cricket coaching. In 2008, he suffered a workplace accident while driving a forklift. As a result, half of his left foot had to be amputated. He remarked about accident "I didn't want to remember all the no-balls that I bowled through my career. So I decided to do something permanent about it..."

The Otago Daily Times named him in their New Zealand Test team of the "greatest 11 players NZ forgot".
