= Ian Mitchell (South African cricketer) =

South African cricketer (born 1977)

Personal information
- Born: 14 December 1977 (age 48); Johannesburg, South Africa
- Source: Cricinfo, 12 December 2020

Ian Mitchell (born 14 December 1977) is a South African cricketer. He played in 40 first-class and 53 List A matches for Border from 1995 to 2004.

== See also ==
- List of Border representative cricketers
