= Carl Bulfin =

New Zealand cricketer (born 1973)

Personal information
- Born: 19 August 1973 (age 53); Blenheim, New Zealand
- Batting: Right-handed
- Bowling: Right-arm fast-medium

International information
- National side: New Zealand
- ODI debut (cap 110): 25 March 1999 v South Africa
- Last ODI: 31 May 1999 v Scotland

Career statistics
Competition	ODI	FC	LA
Matches	4	22	53
Runs scored	9	338	322
Batting average	9.00	13.00	14.63
100s/50s	0/0	0/0	0/1
Top score	7*	47	59*
Balls bowled	102	3,121	2,407
Wickets	0	50	66
Bowling average	–	32.52	27.51
5 wickets in innings	–	3	0
10 wickets in match	–	1	0
Best bowling	–	5/53	3/15
Catches/stumpings	1/–	5/–	10/–
- Source: Cricinfo, 11 May 2017

Carl Edwin Bulfin (born 19 August 1973) is a former New Zealand cricketer who played in four One Day Internationals in 1999.

Bulfin was selected for the New Zealand cricket team after several performances in the domestic one day and Cricket Max competition. Known for his fast medium deliveries, Bulfin was a novelty on the cricket field during the mid/late 1990s.

He was born in Blenheim and has now retired from the game after injuries forced him away from the sport in 2000. He now works as a house painter and mentors young bowlers in the Blenheim area.

== International career ==
Although Bulfin was selected for New Zealand to play against South Africa and then again in the 1999 World Cup pool games, injuries prevented him excelling on the international stage.
