= Andrew Hall (English cricketer) =

English cricketer

Personal information
- Full name: Andrew James Hall
- Born: 12 March 1973 (age 53); Manchester, Lancashire, England
- Nickname: Albert
- Batting: Right-handed
- Bowling: Right-arm medium

Domestic team information
- Years: Team
- 1993–present: Cheshire

Career statistics
Competition	List A
Matches	6
Runs scored	116
Batting average	19.33
100s/50s	–/1
Top score	66
Balls bowled	–
Wickets	–
Bowling average	–
5 wickets in innings	–
10 wickets in match	–
Best bowling	–
Catches/stumpings	3/–
- Source: Cricinfo, 4 April 2011

Andrew James Hall (born 12 March 1973) is an English cricketer. Hall is a right-handed batsman who bowled right-arm medium-fast pace. He was born in Manchester, Lancashire.

Hall made his debut for Cheshire in the 1993 Minor Counties Championship against Shropshire. Hall has played Minor counties cricket for Cheshire from 1993 to the present day, including 72 Minor Counties Championship matches and 34 MCCA Knockout Trophy matches. In 1994, he made his List A debut against Durham in the NatWest Trophy. He played five further List A matches for Cheshire, the last of which came against Hampshire in the 2004 Cheltenham & Gloucester Trophy. In his six List A matches, he scored 116 runs at a batting average of 19.33, with a high score of 66. His only List A half century for Cheshire came against Cornwall in the 2001 Cheltenham & Gloucester Trophy. Hall was the Cheshire captain from 2002 to 2009.

He also played Second XI cricket for the Surrey Second XI. Hall has played for an England and Wales Cricket Board XI, representing the team in the 2004 European Cricket Championship Division One tournament, against such teams as Denmark, Ireland, the Netherlands and Scotland.

He currently plays at his home club Marple CC, captaining the 1st XI.
