= Laden Gamiet =

South African cricketer (born 1978)

Personal information
- Born: 23 January 1978 (age 48); East London, South Africa
- Source: Cricinfo, 6 December 2020

Laden Gamiet (born 23 January 1978) is a South African cricketer. He played in 54 first-class, 69 List A, and 12 Twenty20 matches from 1995 to 2008.
