= Daryl Tuffey =

New Zealand cricketer

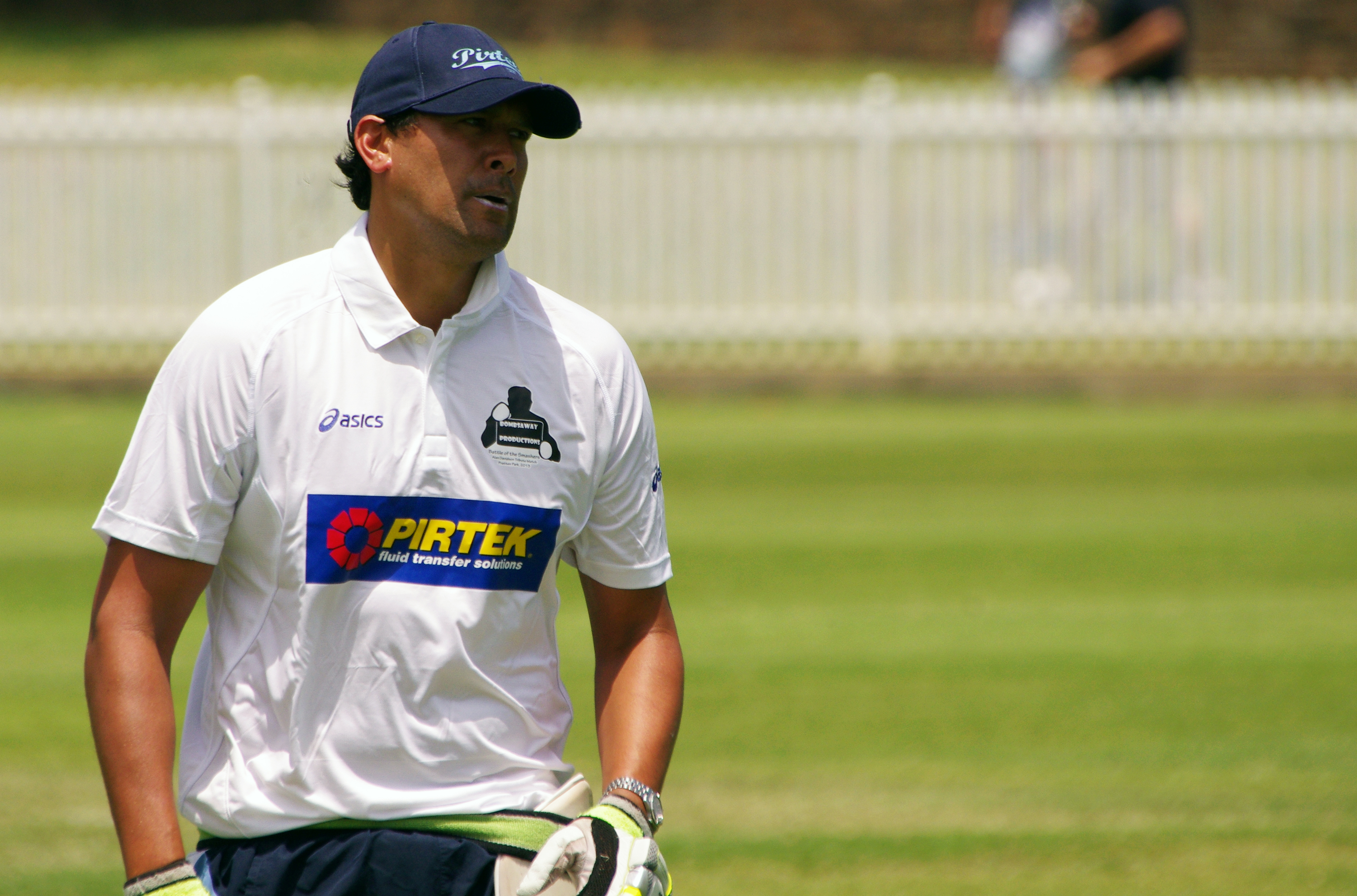
- Daryl Tuffey (2014)

Personal information
- Full name: Daryl Raymond Tuffey
- Born: 11 June 1978 (age 48); Milton, New Zealand
- Height: 189 cm (6 ft 2 in)
- Batting: Right-handed
- Bowling: Right-arm fast-medium
- Role: Bowler

International information
- National side: New Zealand (2000–2010)
- Test debut (cap 209): 31 March 2001 v Australia
- Last Test: 19 March 2010 v Australia
- ODI debut (cap 116): 27 September 2000 v Zimbabwe
- Last ODI: 28 November 2010 v India
- ODI shirt no.: 14 (prev. 37)
- T20I debut (cap 10): 17 February 2005 v Australia
- Last T20I: 26 February 2010 v Australia

Domestic team information
- Years: Team
- 1996/97–2012/13: Northern Districts
- 2007/08–2011/12: Auckland

Career statistics
Competition	Test	ODI	FC	LA
Matches	26	94	91	220
Runs scored	427	295	1,438	868
Batting average	16.42	9.51	17.11	12.57
100s/50s	0/1	0/0	0/6	0/0
Top score	80*	36	89*	38*
Balls bowled	4,877	4,333	16,607	10,490
Wickets	77	110	288	265
Bowling average	31.75	32.12	26.78	31.21
5 wickets in innings	2	0	10	2
10 wickets in match	0	0	1	0
Best bowling	6/54	4/24	7/12	5/21
Catches/stumpings	15/–	20/–	41/–	52/–
- Source: ESPNcricinfo, 27 March 2017

Daryl Raymond Tuffey (born 11 June 1978) is a former New Zealand cricketer who represented New Zealand in all formats internationally. Tuffey was born in Milton, Otago, and played domestic first-class cricket for Northern Districts Knights. Tuffey retired from all forms of cricket on 14 September 2012.

== International career ==
Cricinfo journalist Lynn McConnell described Tuffey as a bowler with "an amazing penchant for taking wickets in the first over he bowled". Tuffey made an uninspiring debut, conceding 127 runs for no wickets against Australia in 1999–00, but took his first Test wickets in his next match, ending with three for 38 in the final innings as opponents South Africa chased down 101 on the final day.

Tuffey played his first full Test series at home against Pakistan in 2000–01. Tuffey got sixteen wickets in the series, including a Man of the Match-performance with seven wickets for 77 in the final Test, which New Zealand won by an innings and 185 runs to tie the series 1–1.

He also played all five ODIs against Pakistan, ending with thirteen wickets in the ODI series to become New Zealand's leading wicket-taker in the series. The series against Pakistan included a career-best four for 24 at Napier, which won him another Man of the Match award.

=== Injury and comeback ===
Tuffey played a number of ODIs over the Northern summer of 2001 before straining a hamstring during the 2001–02 tour of Australia. He didn't play again on tour of Australia, but returned for the ODIs against England in February, before taking match figures of nine for 116 on his return to Test cricket in March 2002. The figures were enough to secure Man of the Match honours once again, as New Zealand won the third Test against England by 78 runs and tied the series 1–1.

Following this, Tuffey was a regular in the New Zealand Test team for two years, with his best performance in this time coming with eight for 53 against India in the 2002–03 home Test series. The pitches in this series were described as "hardly beyond reproach" and as "greentops", by Wisden Cricketer's Almanack writer Lawrence Booth, but Booth had some fine words for Tuffey regardless, describing him as "irresistible". Tuffey played in all seven matches during the subsequent ODI series with India. However he was dropped from the side at the 2003 World Cup after a spell of 5–0–36–0 against Sri Lanka in the opening match, which included a "thin edge" off Sanath Jayasuriya's bat which was not seen by the umpire.

Tuffey missed his first Test in one and a half years when a bruised thigh forced him to withdraw from the third Test against South Africa in 2003–04, but he was back in the team that toured England in the 2004 season. Before that series, his last three Tests had yielded three wickets, and Tuffey did not improve in the next two; a total of three wickets at a bowling average of 82 saw him dropped from the Test side. He also missed much of the ODI season in England, playing in two of the seven matches New Zealand played from June to September 2004, but returned for the home ODIs against Sri Lanka in December and Australia in February. He had success against Sri Lanka, taking the wickets of Saman Jayantha and Marvan Atapattu for figures of 8–1–17–2, but the next four ODIs were cancelled out of respect for the victims of the tsunami that struck Sri Lanka, and when the Chappell–Hadlee came around Tuffey could only take one wicket in the first three matches, conceding 25 runs in two overs in the last one.

He made his T20I debut in the first ever T20I, held in New Zealand on 17 February 2005, in which Ricky Ponting hit four sixes and a four to register a 30-run over against Tuffey. Tuffey's run of bad form continued several days later, when he conceded fourteen runs before the first legal delivery of an ODI against Australia, in an opening over that lasted fourteen balls.

=== Out of the squad ===
Tuffey was dropped on 1 March 2006, with New Zealand coach John Bracewell saying that Tuffey suffered "from a complete lack of confidence". Nine days later, he had to answer charges of misconduct in a New Zealand Cricket inquiry, and he was eventually fined $1,000 after the incident. Tuffey was still in the selectors' minds, however, as he was selected for the New Zealand A team to tour Sri Lanka in September and October 2005.

=== 2007 World Cup ===
In a surprise twist Tuffey was reselected for the New Zealand one day squad for the 2007 World Cup in the West Indies. Many questioned his selection as he had considerably worse figures than other possible candidates for the spot, notably Auckland seamer Chris Martin.

== Domestic career ==
Tuffey was due to play for the Auckland Aces for the 2007–08 season but he turned it down to play club cricket in Sydney.

== Controversies ==
In September 2007, Tuffey was convicted of drunk driving, fined $420 plus $303 in court costs and disqualified from driving for 6 months.

It was revealed in December 2013 that Tuffey was under investigation by the International Cricket Council, along with two other New Zealand cricketers, for match fixing. Tuffey professed shock at the investigation and said he was seeking legal counsel. Tuffey announced in September 2014 that he had been cleared by Metropolitan Police of any involvement in match fixing.

== See also ==
- List of Auckland representative cricketers
