= Matthew Walker (New Zealand cricketer) =

New Zealand cricketer (born 1977)

Mathew Walker
Personal information
- Full name: Matthew David John Walker
- Born: 17 January 1977 (age 49); Ōpunake, New Zealand
- Batting: Right-handed
- Bowling: Right-arm medium

International information
- National side: New Zealand
- ODI debut (cap 134): 29 November 2003 v Pakistan
- Last ODI: 7 December 2003 v Pakistan

Career statistics
Competition	ODI	FC	LA
Matches	3	50	65
Runs scored	10	2,070	843
Batting average	10.00	32.85	25.51
100s/50s	0/0	2/13	0/6
Top score	10	126	62
Balls bowled	132	7,209	2,533
Wickets	4	106	64
Bowling average	29.75	23.33	25.51
5 wickets in innings	0	3	1
10 wickets in match	0	0	0
Best bowling	4/49	6/114	5/22
Catches/stumpings	2/–	43/–	20/–
- Source: Cricinfo, 4 May 2017

Matthew David John Walker (born 17 January 1977) is a former New Zealand cricketer who played three One Day Internationals for New Zealand against Pakistan in 2003.
