= International cricket in 2000–01 =

Sports season

The 2000–01 international cricket season was from September 2000 to April 2001.

== Season overview ==
International tours
Start date	Home team	Away team	Results [Matches]			
Start date	Home team	Away team	Test	ODI	FC	LA
12 September 2000	Zimbabwe	New Zealand	0–2 [2]	2–1 [3]	—	—
20 October 2000	Pakistan	England	0–1 [3]	2–1 [3]	—	—
18 October 2000	South Africa	New Zealand	2–0 [3]	5–0 [6]	—	—
10 November 2000	Bangladesh	India	0–1 [1]	—	—	—
8 November 2000	India	Zimbabwe	1–0 [2]	4–1 [5]	—	—
7 November 2000	Australia	West Indies	5–0 [5]	—	—	—
7 December 2000	South Africa	Sri Lanka	2–0 [3]	5–1 [6]	—	—
19 December 2000	New Zealand	Zimbabwe	0–0 [1]	1–2 [3]	—	—
28 January 2001	New Zealand	Sri Lanka	—	1–4 [5]	—	—
5 February 2001	Sri Lanka	England	1–2 [3]	3–0 [3]	—	—
17 February 2001	New Zealand	Pakistan	1–1 [3]	3-2 [5]	—	—
17 February 2001	India	Australia	2–1 [3]	2–3 [5]	—	—
4 March 2001	West Indies	South Africa	1–2 [5]	2–5 [7]	—	—
7 April 2001	Zimbabwe	Bangladesh	2–0 [2]	3–0 [3]	—	—
International tournaments
Start date	Tournament				Winners	
3 October 2000	(Kenya) 2000 ICC KnockOut Trophy				New Zealand	
20 October 2000	(United Arab Emirates) 2000–01 Sharjah Champions Trophy				Sri Lanka	
11 January 2001	2000–01 Australia Tri-Nation Series				Australia	
8 April 2001	(United Arab Emirates) 2000–01 ARY Gold Cup				Sri Lanka	

== September ==
=== New Zealand in Zimbabwe ===
Test series
No.	Date	Home captain	Away captain	Venue	Result
Test 1510	12–16 September	Heath Streak	Stephen Fleming	Queens Sports Club, Bulawayo	New Zealand won by 7 wickets
Test 1511	19–23 September	Heath Streak	Stephen Fleming	Harare Sports Club, Harare	New Zealand won by 8 wickets
ODI series
No.	Date	Home captain	Away captain	Venue	Result
ODI 1627	27 September	Heath Streak	Stephen Fleming	Harare Sports Club, Harare	New Zealand by 7 wickets
ODI 1628	30 September	Heath Streak	Stephen Fleming	Queens Sports Club, Bulawayo	Zimbabwe by 21 runs
ODI 1629	1 October	Heath Streak	Stephen Fleming	Queens Sports Club, Bulawayo	Zimbabwe by 6 wickets

== October ==
=== 2000 ICC KnockOut Trophy ===
Pre Quarter-finals
No.	Date	Team 1	Captain 1	Team 2	Captain 2	Venue	Result
ODI 1630	3 October	Kenya	Maurice Odumbe	India	Sourav Ganguly	Gymkhana Club Ground, Nairobi	India by 8 wickets
ODI 1631	4 October	Sri Lanka	Sanath Jayasuriya	West Indies	Sherwin Campbell	Gymkhana Club Ground, Nairobi	Sri Lanka by 108 runs
ODI 1632	5 October	Bangladesh	Naimur Rahman	England	Nasser Hussain	Gymkhana Club Ground, Nairobi	England by 8 wickets
Quarter-finals
No.	Date	Team 1	Captain 1	Team 2	Captain 2	Venue	Result
ODI 1633	7 October	Australia	Steve Waugh	India	Sourav Ganguly	Gymkhana Club Ground, Nairobi	India by 20 runs
ODI 1634	8 October	Pakistan	Moin Khan	Sri Lanka	Sanath Jayasuriya	Gymkhana Club Ground, Nairobi	Pakistan by 9 wickets
ODI 1635	9 October	New Zealand	Stephen Fleming	Zimbabwe	Heath Streak	Gymkhana Club Ground, Nairobi	New Zealand by 64 runs
ODI 1636	10 October	England	Nasser Hussain	South Africa	Shaun Pollock	Gymkhana Club Ground, Nairobi	South Africa by 8 wickets
Semi-finals
No.	Date	Team 1	Captain 1	Team 2	Captain 2	Venue	Result
ODI 1637	11 October	New Zealand	Stephen Fleming	Pakistan	Moin Khan	Gymkhana Club Ground, Nairobi	New Zealand by 4 wickets
ODI 1638	13 October	India	Sourav Ganguly	South Africa	Shaun Pollock	Gymkhana Club Ground, Nairobi	India by 95 runs
Final
No.	Date	Team 1	Captain 1	Team 2	Captain 2	Venue	Result
ODI 1639	15 October	India	Sourav Ganguly	New Zealand	Stephen Fleming	Gymkhana Club Ground, Nairobi	New Zealand by 4 wickets

=== 2000–01 Sharjah Champions Trophy ===
Team	Pld	W	L	T	NR	NRR	Pts
Sri Lanka	4	4	0	0	0	+1.226	8
India	4	2	2	0	0	-0.397	4
Zimbabwe	4	0	4	0	0	−0.819	0

Group stage
No.	Date	Team 1	Captain 1	Team 2	Captain 2	Venue	Result
ODI 1640	20 October	India	Sourav Ganguly	Sri Lanka	Sanath Jayasuriya	Sharjah Cricket Stadium, Sharjah	Sri Lanka by 5 wickets
ODI 1642	21 October	Sri Lanka	Sanath Jayasuriya	Zimbabwe	Heath Streak	Sharjah Cricket Stadium, Sharjah	Sri Lanka by 7 wickets
ODI 1644	22 October	India	Sourav Ganguly	Zimbabwe	Heath Streak	Sharjah Cricket Stadium, Sharjah	India by 13 runs
ODI 1646	25 October	Sri Lanka	Sanath Jayasuriya	Zimbabwe	Heath Streak	Sharjah Cricket Stadium, Sharjah	Sri Lanka by 123 runs
ODI 1648	26 October	India	Sourav Ganguly	Zimbabwe	Heath Streak	Sharjah Cricket Stadium, Sharjah	India by 3 wickets
ODI 1650	27 October	India	Sourav Ganguly	Sri Lanka	Sanath Jayasuriya	Sharjah Cricket Stadium, Sharjah	Sri Lanka by 68 runs
Final
No.	Date	Team 1	Captain 1	Team 2	Captain 2	Venue	Result
ODI 1652	29 October	India	Sourav Ganguly	Sri Lanka	Sanath Jayasuriya	Sharjah Cricket Stadium, Sharjah	Sri Lanka by 245 runs

=== England in Pakistan ===
ODI series
No.	Date	Home captain	Away captain	Venue	Result
ODI 1645	24 October	Moin Khan	Nasser Hussain	National Stadium, Karachi	England by 5 wickets
ODI 1649	27 October	Moin Khan	Nasser Hussain	Gaddafi Stadium, Lahore	Pakistan by 8 wickets
ODI 1653	30 October	Moin Khan	Nasser Hussain	Rawalpindi Cricket Stadium, Rawalpindi	Pakistan by 6 wickets
Test series
No.	Date	Home captain	Away captain	Venue	Result
Test 1513	15–19 November	Moin Khan	Nasser Hussain	Gaddafi Stadium, Lahore	Match drawn
Test 1518	29 November–3 December	Moin Khan	Nasser Hussain	Iqbal Stadium, Faisalabad	Match drawn
Test 1521	7–11 December	Moin Khan	Nasser Hussain	National Stadium, Karachi	England by 6 wickets

=== New Zealand in South Africa ===
ODI series
No.	Date	Home captain	Away captain	Venue	Result
ODI 1641	20 October	Shaun Pollock	Stephen Fleming	Senwes Park, Potchefstroom	No result
ODI 1643	22 October	Shaun Pollock	Stephen Fleming	Willowmoore Park, Benoni	South Africa by 6 wickets
ODI 1647	25 October	Shaun Pollock	Stephen Fleming	Centurion Park, Centurion	South Africa by 115 runs (D/L method)
ODI 1651	28 October	Shaun Pollock	Stephen Fleming	De Beers Diamond Oval, Kimberley	South Africa by 5 wickets
ODI 1654	1 November	Shaun Pollock	Stephen Fleming	Kingsmead, Durban	South Africa by 6 wickets (D/L method)
ODI 1655	4 November	Shaun Pollock	Stephen Fleming	Newlands, Cape Town	South Africa by 3 wickets
Test series
No.	Date	Home captain	Away captain	Venue	Result
Test 1514	17–21 November	Shaun Pollock	Stephen Fleming	Mangaung Oval, Bloemfontein	South Africa by 5 wickets
Test 1519	30 November–4 December	Shaun Pollock	Stephen Fleming	St George's Park, Port Elizabeth	South Africa by 7 wickets
Test 1522	8–12 December	Shaun Pollock	Stephen Fleming	Wanderers Stadium, Johannesburg	Match drawn

== November ==
=== India in Bangladesh ===
Test series
No.	Date	Home captain	Away captain	Venue	Result
Test 1512	10–13 November	Naimur Rahman	Sourav Ganguly	Bangabandhu National Stadium, Dhaka	India by 9 wickets

=== Zimbabwe in India ===
Test series
No.	Date	Home captain	Away captain	Venue	Result
Test 1515	18–22 November	Sourav Ganguly	Heath Streak	Feroz Shah Kotla, Delhi	India by 7 wickets
Test 1517	25–29 November	Sourav Ganguly	Heath Streak	Vidarbha Cricket Association Ground, Nagpur	Match drawn
ODI series
No.	Date	Home captain	Away captain	Venue	Result
ODI 1656	2 December	Sourav Ganguly	Heath Streak	Barabati Stadium, Cuttack	India by 3 wickets
ODI 1657	5 December	Sourav Ganguly	Heath Streak	Sardar Patel Stadium, Ahmedabad	India by 62 runs
ODI 1658	8 December	Sourav Ganguly	Heath Streak	Barkatullah Khan Stadium, Jodhpur	Zimbabwe by 1 wicket
ODI 1659	11 December	Sourav Ganguly	Heath Streak	Green Park Stadium, Kanpur	India by 9 wickets
ODI 1660	14 December	Rahul Dravid	Heath Streak	Madhavrao Scindia Cricket Ground, Rajkot	India by 39 runs

=== West Indies in Australia ===
Test series
No.	Date	Home captain	Away captain	Venue	Result
Test 1516	23–25 November	Steve Waugh	Jimmy Adams	The Gabba, Brisbane	Australia by an innings and 126 runs
Test 1520	1–3 December	Steve Waugh	Jimmy Adams	WACA Ground, Perth	Australia by an innings and 27 runs
Test 1523	15–19 December	Adam Gilchrist	Jimmy Adams	Adelaide Oval, Adelaide	Australia by 5 wickets
Test 1525	26–29 December	Steve Waugh	Jimmy Adams	Melbourne Cricket Ground, Melbourne	Australia by 352 runs
Test 1527	2–6 January	Steve Waugh	Jimmy Adams	Sydney Cricket Ground, Sydney	Australia by 6 wickets

== December ==
=== Sri Lanka in South Africa ===
ODI series
No.	Date	Home captain	Away captain	Venue	Result
ODI 1661	15 December	Shaun Pollock	Sanath Jayasuriya	St George's Park, Port Elizabeth	South Africa by 4 wickets
ODI 1662	17 December	Shaun Pollock	Sanath Jayasuriya	Buffalo Park, East London	South Africa by 95 runs
ODI 1666	9 January	Shaun Pollock	Sanath Jayasuriya	Boland Park, Paarl	South Africa by 8 wickets
ODI 1668	11 January	Shaun Pollock	Sanath Jayasuriya	Newlands, Cape Town	South Africa by 99 runs
ODI 1671	14 January	Shaun Pollock	Sanath Jayasuriya	Mangaung Oval, Bloemfontein	South Africa by 5 wickets
ODI 1673	17 January	Shaun Pollock	Sanath Jayasuriya	Wanderers Stadium, Johannesburg	Sri Lanka by 4 runs (D/L method)
Test series
No.	Date	Home captain	Away captain	Venue	Result
Test 1526	26–30 December	Shaun Pollock	Sanath Jayasuriya	Kingsmead, Durban	Match drawn
Test 1528	2–4 January	Shaun Pollock	Sanath Jayasuriya	Newlands, Cape Town	South Africa by an innings and 229 runs
Test 1529	20–22 January	Shaun Pollock	Sanath Jayasuriya	Centurion Park, Centurion	South Africa by an innings and 7 runs

=== Zimbabwe in New Zealand ===
Test series
No.	Date	Home captain	Away captain	Venue	Result
Test 1524	26–30 December	Stephen Fleming	Heath Streak	Basin Reserve, Wellington	Match drawn
ODI series
No.	Date	Home captain	Away captain	Venue	Result
ODI 1663	2 January	Stephen Fleming	Heath Streak	Owen Delany Park, Taupō	Zimbabwe by 70 runs (D/L) method
ODI 1664	4 January	Stephen Fleming	Heath Streak	Wellington Regional Stadium, Wellington	New Zealand by 8 wickets
ODI 1665	7 January	Stephen Fleming	Heath Streak	Eden Park, Auckland	Zimbabwe by 1 wicket

== January ==
=== 2000–01 Australia Tri-Nation Series ===
Pos	Team	P	W	L	NR	T	NRR	Points
1	Australia	8	8	0	0	0	16	1.36
2	West Indies	8	3	5	0	0	6	−0.725
3	Zimbabwe	8	1	7	0	0	2	−0.546

Group stage
No.	Date	Team 1	Captain 1	Team 2	Captain 2	Venue	Result
ODI 1667	11 January	Australia	Steve Waugh	West Indies	Jimmy Adams	Melbourne Cricket Ground, Melbourne	Australia by 74 runs
ODI 1669	13 January	West Indies	Jimmy Adams	Zimbabwe	Heath Streak	The Gabba, Brisbane	West Indies by 1 wicket
ODI 1670	14 January	Australia	Adam Gilchrist	West Indies	Jimmy Adams	The Gabba, Brisbane	Australia by 9 wickets
ODI 1672	17 January	Australia	Adam Gilchrist	West Indies	Jimmy Adams	Sydney Cricket Ground, Sydney	Australia by 28 runs (D/L method)
ODI 1674	21 January	Australia	Adam Gilchrist	Zimbabwe	Heath Streak	Melbourne Cricket Ground, Melbourne	Australia by 8 wickets
ODI 1675	23 January	West Indies	Jimmy Adams	Zimbabwe	Heath Streak	Sydney Cricket Ground, Sydney	Zimbabwe by 47 runs
ODI 1676	25 January	West Indies	Jimmy Adams	Zimbabwe	Heath Streak	Adelaide Oval, Adelaide	West Indies by 77 runs (D/L method)
ODI 1677	26 January	Australia	Steve Waugh	West Indies	Jimmy Adams	Sydney Cricket Ground, Sydney	Australia by 10 wickets
ODI 1678	28 January	Australia	Steve Waugh	Zimbabwe	Heath Streak	Sydney Cricket Ground, Sydney	Australia by 86 runs
ODI 1679	30 January	Australia	Steve Waugh	Zimbabwe	Heath Streak	Bellerive Oval, Hobart	Australia by 6 wickets
ODI 1681	2 February	West Indies	Jimmy Adams	Zimbabwe	Heath Streak	WACA Ground, Perth	West Indies by 44 runs
ODI 1683	4 February	Australia	Steve Waugh	Zimbabwe	Heath Streak	WACA Ground, Perth	Australia by 1 run
Finals
No.	Date	Team 1	Captain 1	Team 2	Captain 2	Venue	Result
ODI 1685	7 February	Australia	Steve Waugh	West Indies	Jimmy Adams	Sydney Cricket Ground, Sydney	Australia by 134 runs
ODI 1687	9 February	Australia	Steve Waugh	West Indies	Jimmy Adams	Melbourne Cricket Ground, Melbourne	Australia by 39 runs

=== Sri Lanka in New Zealand ===
ODI series
No.	Date	Home captain	Away captain	Venue	Result
ODI 1680	31 January	Stephen Fleming	Sanath Jayasuriya	McLean Park, Napier	Sri Lanka by 61 runs
ODI 1682	3 February	Stephen Fleming	Sanath Jayasuriya	Wellington Regional Stadium, Wellington	Sri Lanka by 3 wickets
ODI 1684	6 February	Stephen Fleming	Sanath Jayasuriya	Eden Park, Auckland	Sri Lanka by 9 wickets
ODI 1686	8 February	Stephen Fleming	Sanath Jayasuriya	Seddon Park, Hamilton	Sri Lanka by 3 runs (D/L method)
ODI 1688	11 February	Stephen Fleming	Sanath Jayasuriya	AMI Stadium, Christchurch	New Zealand by 13 runs

== February ==
=== England in Sri Lanka ===
Test series
No.	Date	Home captain	Away captain	Venue	Result
Test 1530	22–26 February	Sanath Jayasuriya	Nasser Hussain	Galle International Stadium, Galle	Sri Lanka by an innings and 28 runs
Test 1532	7–11 March	Sanath Jayasuriya	Nasser Hussain	Asgiriya Stadium, Kandy	England by 3 wickets
Test 1537	15–19 March	Sanath Jayasuriya	Nasser Hussain	Singhalese Sports Club Cricket Ground, Colombo	England by 4 wickets
ODI series
No.	Date	Home captain	Away captain	Venue	Result
ODI 1694	23 March	Sanath Jayasuriya	Graham Thorpe	Rangiri Dambulla International Stadium, Dambulla	Sri Lanka by 5 wickets
ODI 1695	25 March	Sanath Jayasuriya	Graham Thorpe	R. Premadasa Stadium, Colombo	Sri Lanka by 66 runs
ODI 1697	27 March	Sanath Jayasuriya	Graham Thorpe	Singhalese Sports Club Cricket Ground, Colombo	Sri Lanka by 10 wickets

=== Pakistan in New Zealand ===
ODI series
No.	Date	Home captain	Away captain	Venue	Result
ODI 1689	17–18 February	Stephen Fleming	Moin Khan	Eden Park, Auckland	Pakistan by 6 wickets
ODI 1690	20 February	Stephen Fleming	Moin Khan	McLean Park, Napier	New Zealand by 6 wickets
ODI 1691	22 February	Stephen Fleming	Moin Khan	Wellington Regional Stadium, Wellington	Pakistan by 28 runs
ODI 1692	25 February	Stephen Fleming	Moin Khan	AMI Stadium, Christchurch	New Zealand by 138 runs
ODI 1693	28 February	Stephen Fleming	Moin Khan	Carisbrook, Dunedin	New Zealand by 4 wickets
Test series
No.	Date	Home captain	Away captain	Venue	Result
Test 1533	8–12 March	Stephen Fleming	Moin Khan	Eden Park, Auckland	Pakistan by 299 runs
Test 1536	15–19 March	Stephen Fleming	Moin Khan	AMI Stadium, Christchurch	Match drawn
Test 1540	27–30 March	Stephen Fleming	Moin Khan	Seddon Park, Hamilton	New Zealand by an innings and 185 runs

=== Australia in India ===
Test series
No.	Date	Home captain	Away captain	Venue	Result
Test 1531	27 February–7 March	Sourav Ganguly	Steve Waugh	Wankhede Stadium, Mumbai	Australia by 10 wickets
Test 1535	11–15 March	Sourav Ganguly	Steve Waugh	Eden Gardens, Kolkata	India by 171 runs
Test 1539	18–22 March	Sourav Ganguly	Steve Waugh	M. A. Chidambaram Stadium, Chennai	India by 2 wickets
ODI series
No.	Date	Home captain	Away captain	Venue	Result
ODI 1696	25 March	Sourav Ganguly	Steve Waugh	M. Chinnaswamy Stadium, Bangalore	India by 60 runs
ODI 1698	28 March	Sourav Ganguly	Steve Waugh	Nehru Stadium, Pune	Australia by 8 wickets
ODI 1699	31 March	Sourav Ganguly	Steve Waugh	Nehru Stadium, Indore	India by 118 runs
ODI 1700	3 April	Sourav Ganguly	Steve Waugh	Indira Priyadarshini Stadium, Visakhapatnam	Australia by 93 runs
ODI 1701	6 April	Sourav Ganguly	Steve Waugh	Fatorda Stadium, Margao	Australia by 4 wickets

== March ==
=== South Africa in the West Indies ===
Test series
No.	Date	Home captain	Away captain	Venue	Result
Test 1534	9–13 March	Carl Hooper	Shaun Pollock	Bourda, Georgetown	Match drawn
Test 1538	17–21 March	Carl Hooper	Shaun Pollock	Queen's Park Oval, Port of Spain	South Africa by 69 runs
Test 1541	29 March-2 April	Carl Hooper	Shaun Pollock	Kensington Oval, Bridgetown	Match drawn
Test 1542	6–10 April	Carl Hooper	Shaun Pollock	Antigua Recreation Ground, St. John's	South Africa by 82 runs
Test 1544	19–23 April	Carl Hooper	Shaun Pollock	Sabina Park, Kingston	West Indies by 130 runs
ODI series
No.	Date	Home captain	Away captain	Venue	Result
ODI 1712	28 April	Carl Hooper	Shaun Pollock	Sabina Park, Kingston	West Indies by 3 wickets
ODI 1713	2 May	Carl Hooper	Shaun Pollock	Antigua Recreation Ground, St. John's	South Africa by 8 wickets
ODI 1714	5 May	Carl Hooper	Shaun Pollock	National Cricket Stadium, St. George's	South Africa by 132 runs
ODI 1715	6 May	Carl Hooper	Shaun Pollock	National Cricket Stadium, St. George's	South Africa by 8 wickets
ODI 1716	9 May	Carl Hooper	Shaun Pollock	Kensington Oval, Bridgetown	South Africa by 7 wickets
ODI 1717	12 May	Carl Hooper	Shaun Pollock	Queen's Park Oval, Port of Spain	South Africa by 53 runs
ODI 1716	16 May	Carl Hooper	Shaun Pollock	Arnos Vale Stadium, Kingstown	West Indies by 6 wickets

== April ==
=== Bangladesh in Zimbabwe ===
ODI series
No.	Date	Home captain	Away captain	Venue	Result
ODI 1702	7 April	Heath Streak	Naimur Rahman	Harare Sports Club, Harare	Zimbabwe by 7 wickets
ODI 1703	8 April	Heath Streak	Naimur Rahman	Harare Sports Club, Harare	Zimbabwe by 127 runs
ODI 1704	11 April	Heath Streak	Naimur Rahman	Queens Sports Club, Bulawayo	Zimbabwe by 36 runs
Test series
No.	Date	Home captain	Away captain	Venue	Result
Test 1543	19–22 April	Heath Streak	Naimur Rahman	Queens Sports Club, Bulawayo	Zimbabwe by an innings and 32 runs
Test 1545	22–30 April	Heath Streak	Naimur Rahman	Harare Sports Club, Harare	Zimbabwe by 8 wickets

=== 2000–01 ARY Gold Cup ===
Team	Pld	W	L	T	NR	NRR	Pts
Pakistan	4	4	0	0	0	+1.166	8
Sri Lanka	4	1	3	0	0	-0.085	2
New Zealand	4	1	3	0	0	−0.989	2

Group stage
No.	Date	Team 1	Captain 1	Team 2	Captain 2	Venue	Result
ODI 1704	8 April	Pakistan	Waqar Younis	Sri Lanka	Sanath Jayasuriya	Sharjah Cricket Stadium, Sharjah	Pakistan by 16 runs
ODI 1705	10 April	New Zealand	Craig McMillan	Sri Lanka	Sanath Jayasuriya	Sharjah Cricket Stadium, Sharjah	Sri Lanka by 106 runs
ODI 1707	12 April	Pakistan	Waqar Younis	New Zealand	Craig McMillan	Sharjah Cricket Stadium, Sharjah	Pakistan by 8 wickets
ODI 1708	13 April	Pakistan	Waqar Younis	Sri Lanka	Sanath Jayasuriya	Sharjah Cricket Stadium, Sharjah	Pakistan by 28 runs
ODI 1709	15 April	Pakistan	Waqar Younis	New Zealand	Craig McMillan	Sharjah Cricket Stadium, Sharjah	Pakistan by 7 wickets
ODI 1710	17 April	New Zealand	Craig McMillan	Sri Lanka	Sanath Jayasuriya	Sharjah Cricket Stadium, Sharjah	New Zealand by 79 runs
Final
No.	Date	Team 1	Captain 1	Team 2	Captain 2	Venue	Result
ODI 1711	20 April	Pakistan	Waqar Younis	Sri Lanka	Sanath Jayasuriya	Sharjah Cricket Stadium, Sharjah	Sri Lanka by 77 runs
