= Central Districts cricket team =

New Zealand cricket team

Central Districts

Personnel
- Captain: Tom Bruce (Super Smash and Plunket Shield); Jayden Lennox (Ford Trophy)
- Coach: Heinrich Malan

Team information
- Colours: Green and gold
- Founded: 1950
- Home ground: McLean Park; Pukekura Park; Fitzherbert Park; Saxton Oval
- Capacity: 19,700 (McLean Park)

History
- Plunket Shield wins: 12
- The Ford Trophy wins: 8
- Men's Super Smash wins: 4
- Champions League Twenty20 wins: 0
- Cricket Max wins: 2
- Global Super League wins: 0
- Official website: cdcricket.co.nz

The Central Stags, formerly known as Central Districts, are a first-class cricket team based in central New Zealand. They are the men's representative side of the Central Districts Cricket Association. They compete in the Plunket Shield first-class competition, The Ford Trophy domestic one-day competition and the Men's Super Smash Twenty20 competition. They are one of six teams that make up New Zealand Cricket. They were the fifth of the current teams to compete in the Plunket Shield which they entered for the first time in the 1950/51 season, and are the only men's first-class side representing regions in both the North and South Islands of New Zealand.

== History ==
Central Districts comprises eight District associations: Hawke's Bay, Horowhenua-Kapiti, Manawatu, Taranaki, Wairarapa and Whanganui in the North Island, and Marlborough and Nelson in the South Island. Previously, many players from these regions competed for Wellington. More than a century before the eventual founding of the Central Districts Cricket Association, the first fully recorded cricket match in New Zealand was played in what is now one of its districts, in Nelson, a men's match in March 1844.

The New Zealand first-class ninth wicket partnership record was set by Harry Cave and Ian Leggat, who had both been members of Central Stags' first team in 1950, in Dunedin in the 1952/53 edition of the Plunket Shield. The pair put on 239 against Otago, scoring 118 and 142 respectively in the second innings.

New Zealand's first-class second wicket partnership record is also held by the Central Stags. Scott Briasco and Ron Hart put on 317 at New Plymouth Pukekura Park in January 1984 against Canterbury, scoring 157 and 167 not out respectively.

The New Zealand Domestic T20 all wickets partnership record is held by Peter Ingram with Jamie How. The pair put on 201 for the first wicket at Pukekura Park in 2011/12, against Wellington.

How and Jeet Raval share the New Zealand Domestic List A partnership record of 321, set against Northern Districts at Seddon Park in 2012/13, a match in which How became the first player to score a Ford Trophy double century. How reached his hundred in 49 balls and broke the competition record that had been held by retired Canterbury batsman Peter Fulton.

One of New Zealand's greatest batsmen, Ross Taylor, played for the Central Stags. He made his first-class debut for the team as an 18-year-old on 9 January 2003. In 2021/22 at Pukekura Park, Taylor broke the record for the fastest Ford Trophy century, reaching his hundred in 49 balls, breaking the national record that had been held by retired Canterbury batsman Peter Fulton. Taylor played his final match for the Stags in 2022/23.

Two batsmen named Ben Smith have played for the Central Stags. Adding to the confusion, both Ben Smith and Ben Smith have scored a first-class double century for the team.

Among New Zealand's premier cricketing schools to have produced many Central Stags players are New Plymouth Boys' High School, Palmerston North Boys' High, Napier Boys' High School, Nelson College, Waimea College, Marlborough Boys' College and Whanganui Collegiate.

The CEO of Central Districts Cricket Association is a former Central Stags player, Lance Hamilton. In September 2019 former CEO Pete de Wet announced that CDCA had signed renowned international coach Mickey Arthur as the Central Stags T20 coach for the 2019/20 Super Smash season, however Arthur was granted a contract release before the competition began.

In 2010, Kieran Noema-Barnett set a New Zealand record for the fastest T20 half century, off just 18 balls. In the 2016 Ford Trophy Grand Final, another Central Stags batsman, Tom Bruce, added the record for the fastest one-day half century in New Zealand with his 50 coming off 16 balls.

Between October 2016 and February 2019, the team set a new Central Districts record for the number of consecutive first-class matches without a defeat, with 21. The previous Central Stags record in the Plunket Shield was 12, while the New Zealand record for most consecutive domestic first-class matches without a loss is 24, set by Wellington (now known as the Wellington Firebirds) between 1984/85 and 1986/87.

In 2017, Brad Schmulian hit the highest score by any New Zealand cricketer on first-class debut with an innings of 203 for the Central Stags against Northern Districts at Bay Oval. The previous record had stood since the late 19th century.

In 2019/20, the team had a chance to become the first team since 1940 to win the Plunket Shield for three seasons in a row. However, the team was second on the table when the final two rounds of the eight-match season were cancelled due to the COVID-19 pandemic. The Plunket Shield was awarded to the Wellington cricket team, whom they had been about to play at McLean Park, with the Stags declared runners-up.

In 2022/23, the team won the first-class Plunket Shield and the List A one-day Ford Trophy in the same season for the first time. The team had previously done the first-class and T20 double in 2019. The team achieved this after both the Ford Trophy Grand Final and the decisive match of the Plunket Shield had been postponed and moved to an alternate venue following Cyclone Gabrielle.

Captain Tom Bruce broke the record for the highest individual first-class score for the Central Stags with an innings of 345 in the Plunket Shield against Auckland Cricket in March 2025. It also became the third highest first-class score in New Zealand Domestic cricket history, and highest since Bert Sutcliffe in 1952 who is the only player to have scored more runs in a domestic first-class innings in New Zealand.

Bruce's triple century contributed to a team total of 700/5 declared, the team's record first-class total.

The previous first-class record for the Stags was held by retired top order batsman Peter Ingram with an innings of 247 in 2008/09. Ingram also scored the team's third highest individual score with 245 not out in 2009/10.

In May 2025, it was announced that the Central Stags would become the first team from New Zealand to compete in Guyana's Global Super League. The team finished third of the five teams, claiming their first overseas T20 win against Australia's Hobart Hurricanes.

On 8 March 2026, pace bowler Brett Randell became the first cricketer in the world to take five wickets in five balls in a first-class match, while playing for the Stags in Napier against Northern Districts. Randell finished with figures of 7/25, and had earlier been sitting on 7/4.

== Honours ==
- Plunket Shield (11)

1953–54, 1966–67, 1967–68, 1970–71, 1986–87, 1991–92, 1998–99, 2005–06, 2012–13, 2017–18, 2018–19, 2022–23

- The Ford Trophy (6)

1984–85, 2000–01, 2003–04, 2011–12, 2014–15, 2015–16, 2022–23, 2025–26

- Men's Super Smash (4)

2007–08, 2009–10, 2018–19, 2024–25

- Cricket Max (2)

1996–97

== Grounds ==
=== Current ===
- McLean Park, Napier
- Saxton Oval, Nelson
- Pukekura Park, New Plymouth
- Fitzherbert Park, Palmerston North

Since 2014–15, Central Districts have used McLean Park, Nelson Park, Napier, Fitzherbert Park and Saxton Oval for first-class matches. Pukekura Park, Fitzherbert Park, McLean Park and Saxton Oval are regularly used for List A and T20 matches.

=== Former ===
- Horton Park, Blenheim
- Dannevirke Domain, Dannevirke
- Cornwall Park, Hastings
- Levin Domain, Levin
- Queen Elizabeth Park, Masterton
- Memorial Park, Motueka
- Trafalgar Park, Nelson
- Yarrow Stadium, New Plymouth
- Waikanae Park, Waikanae
- Cooks Gardens, Whanganui
- Victoria Park, Whanganui

== Current squad ==
- No. denotes the player's squad number, as worn on the back of their shirt.
- ‡ denotes players with international caps.
- CDCA contracts cover the period from September 2026 to April 2027.

No.	Name	Nationality	Birth date	Batting style	Bowling style	Notes
Wicketkeeper
15	Dane Cleaver ‡	New Zealand	1 January 1992 (age 34)	Right-handed	Leg break	CDCA contract
2	Curtis Heaphy	New Zealand	28 July 2003 (age 23)	Right-handed		CDCA contract
Batsmen
84	Taylor Bettelheim	New Zealand	5 April 2001 (age 25)	Right-handed	Leg break	CDCA contract
42	Tom Bruce ‡	New Zealand	2 August 1991 (age 35)	Right-handed	Right arm off break	CDCA contract
72	Sam Cassidy	New Zealand	21 May 2004 (age 22)	Right-handed	Right-arm medium	CDCA contract
28	Dean Foxcroft ‡	New Zealand	20 April 1998 (age 28)	Right-handed	Right-arm off break	CDCA contract
14	Brad Schmulian	New Zealand	3 August 1990 (age 36)	Right-handed	Leg break	CDCA contract
4	Will Young ‡	New Zealand	22 November 1992 (age 33)	Right-handed	Right arm off break	NZC contract
Allrounders
7	Will Clark	New Zealand	5 September 2001 (age 25)	Right-handed	Right-arm medium	
22	Josh Clarkson ‡	New Zealand	21 January 1997 (age 29)	Right-handed	Right-arm medium	CDCA contract
18	Jake Gibson	New Zealand	7 August 1997 (age 29)	Right-handed	Right-arm medium	CDCA contract
77	Angus Schaw	New Zealand	14 March 1994 (age 32)	Right-handed	Right-arm off break	CDCA contract
50	Oscar Mabin	New Zealand	22 November 2005 (age 20)	Right-handed	Right-arm fast-medium	
Bowlers
8	Joey Field	New Zealand	19 December 2000 (age 25)	Right-handed	Right-arm fast-medium	CDCA contract
32	Toby Findlay	New Zealand	21 June 2003 (age 23)	Right-handed	Right-arm fast-medium	CDCA contract
55	Jayden Lennox ‡	New Zealand	14 December 1994 (age 31)	Left-handed	Slow left-arm orthodox	CDCA contract
21	Ajaz Patel ‡	New Zealand	21 October 1988 (age 38)	Left-handed	Slow left-arm orthodox	CDCA contract
00	Brett Randell	New Zealand	20 May 1995 (age 31)	Right-handed	Right-arm fast-medium	CDCA contract
13	Blair Tickner ‡	New Zealand	13 October 1993 (age 33)	Right-handed	Right-arm fast-medium	NZC contract
11	Ray Toole	New Zealand	30 October 1997 (age 29)	Left-handed	Left-arm fast-medium	CDCA contract

== Notable players ==
New Zealand

- Joe Ongley
- Gary Bartlett
- Don Beard
- Tony Blain
- Doug Bracewell
- Scott Briasco
- Tom Bruce
- Carl Bulfin
- Lance Cairns
- Harry Cave
- Murray Chapple
- Dane Cleaver
- Ian Colquhoun
- Bevan Congdon
- Fen Cresswell
- Martin Crowe
- Brendon Diamanti
- Mark Douglas
- Jock Edwards
- Dean Foxcroft
- Blair Furlong
- Mark Greatbatch
- Lance Hamilton
- Noel Harford
- Greg Hay
- Jamie How
- Peter Ingram
- Andrew Jones
- Alistar Jordan
- Ian Leggat
- Greg Loveridge
- Mitchell McClenaghan
- Michael Mason
- Andrew Mathieson
- Adam Milne
- Tarun Nethula
- Kieran Noema-Barnett
- David O'Sullivan
- Jeet Raval
- Craig Spearman
- Glen Sulzberger
- Jacob Oram
- Ajaz Patel
- Andrew Penn
- Vic Pollard
- Seth Rance
- Gary Robertson
- Jesse Ryder
- Mike Shrimpton
- Mathew Sinclair
- Ian Smith
- Derek Stirling
- Ross Taylor
- Ewen Thompson
- Blair Tickner
- Roger Twose
- Ben Wheeler
- George Worker
- Will Young
- Bryan Yuile

Canada

- Geoff Barnett

England

- Ben Smith
- Peter Trego
- Graham Napier
- Min Patel
- Mike Yardy
- Ian Blackwell
- Craig White

Sri Lanka

- Mahela Jayawardena

India

- Murali Vijay
- Amit Mishra

West Indies

- Matthew Forde

Zimbabwe

- Kyle Jarvis

Ireland

- Regan West

== Records ==
See List of New Zealand first-class cricket records
