= Tama Canning =

New Zealand cricketer (born 1977)

Personal information
- Full name: Tamahau Karangatukituki Canning
- Born: 7 April 1977 (age 49); Adelaide, South Australia, Australia
- Batting: Right-handed
- Bowling: Right-arm fast-medium
- Role: All rounder

International information
- National side: New Zealand (2003–2005)
- ODI debut (cap 136): 1 December 2003 v Pakistan
- Last ODI: 5 March 2005 v Australia

Career statistics
Competition	ODI	FC	LA	T20
Matches	4	61	83	2
Runs scored	52	2,141	1,410	10
Batting average	17.33	27.44	21.04	-
100s/50s	0/0	3/8	0/6	0/0
Top score	23*	115	92*	10*
Balls bowled	204	12,719	3,564	42
Wickets	5	206	92	3
Bowling average	40.60	24.47	26.08	18.33
5 wickets in innings	0	6	0	0
10 wickets in match	0	0	0	0
Best bowling	2/30	6/44	4/21	2/22
Catches/stumpings	1/–	28/–	19/0	0/–
- Source: Cricinfo, 20 April 2017

Tamahau Karangatukituki Canning (born 7 April 1977) is an Australian-born former New Zealand cricketer who played four One Day Internationals.

Canning retired from all cricket on 24 December 2006 following a disciplinary breach and forcing him to return to Perth.
