= Shafiek Abrahams =

South African cricketer (born 1968)

Personal information
- Born: 4 March 1968 (age 58); Port Elizabeth, Cape Province, South Africa
- Batting: Right-handed
- Bowling: Right-arm offbreak

International information
- National side: South Africa
- Only ODI (cap 62): 4 November 2000 v New Zealand

Career statistics
| Competition | ODI | FC | LA |
|---|---|---|---|
| Matches | 1 | 80 | 99 |
| Runs scored | 16 | 1,999 | 477 |
| Batting average | – | 20.19 | 22.71 |
| 100s/50s | 0/0 | 0/0 | 0/0 |
| Top score | 16* | 23 | 40 |
| Balls bowled | 60 | 14,021 | 4,294 |
| Wickets | 0 | 184 | 71 |
| Bowling average | – | 30.18 | 41.18 |
| 5 wickets in innings | – | 7 | 0 |
| 10 wickets in match | – | 0 | 0 |
| Best bowling | – | 6/39 | 4/15 |
| Catches/stumpings | 1/– | 62/– | 19/– |
- Source: CricInfo, 26 March 2014

Shafiek Abrahams (born 4 March 1968) is a South African former cricketer and Afrikaans commentator. He played only one One Day International for South Africa in 2000. He was born in Port Elizabeth, South Africa.
