= Brooke Walker (cricketer) =

New Zealand cricketer (born 1977)

Personal information
- Full name: Brooke Graeme Keith Walker
- Born: 25 March 1977 (age 49); Auckland, New Zealand
- Batting: Right-handed
- Bowling: Legbreak

International information
- National side: New Zealand (2000–2002)
- Test debut (cap 212): 17 November 2000 v South Africa
- Last Test: 1 May 2002 v Pakistan
- ODI debut (cap 117): 22 October 2000 v South Africa
- Last ODI: 27 April 2002 v Pakistan

Career statistics
Competition	Test	ODI	FC	LA
Matches	5	11	84	86
Runs scored	118	47	1,769	353
Batting average	19.66	15.66	21.57	9.80
100s/50s	0/0	0/0	1/4	0/0
Top score	27*	16*	107*	33*
Balls bowled	669	438	11,014	3,841
Wickets	5	8	164	80
Bowling average	79.79	52.12	32.46	33.28
5 wickets in innings	0	0	4	0
10 wickets in match	0	0	0	0
Best bowling	2/92	2/43	8/107	4/32
Catches/stumpings	0/–	5/–	38/–	37/–
- Source: Cricinfo, 4 May 2017

Brooke Graeme Keith Walker (born 25 March 1977) is a former New Zealand cricketer. He played five Test matches and 11 One Day Internationals. Walker attended Macleans College. He was born in Auckland.

== Playing career ==
Walker's first-class and List A career started in the 1997–98 New Zealand domestic season. Walker made his debut for New Zealand against South Africa in November 2000. He played domestic cricket for Auckland. Later in his career he was the Auckland captain, leading them to three domestic championships. He retired from all cricket in June 2005.

== Personal life ==
Walker is the father of Nathan Walker, a professional footballer for the Wellington Phoenix in the A-League Men.
