= Chris Drum =

New Zealand cricketer (born 1974)

Personal information
- Full name: Christopher James Drum
- Born: 10 July 1974 (age 52); Auckland, New Zealand
- Batting: Right-handed
- Bowling: Right-arm fast-medium
- Role: Bowler

International information
- National side: New Zealand (1999–2002)
- Test debut (cap 215): 15 March 2001 v Pakistan
- Last Test: 30 March 2002 v England
- ODI debut (cap 109): 14 January 1999 v India
- Last ODI: 17 November 1999 v India

Career statistics
Competition	Test	ODI	FC	LA
Matches	5	5	50	53
Runs scored	10	9	377	96
Batting average	3.33	–	9.92	6.40
100s/50s	0/0	0/0	0/1	0/0
Top score	4	7*	60*	14*
Balls bowled	806	216	8,486	2,686
Wickets	16	4	199	74
Bowling average	30.12	65.25	18.43	27.24
5 wickets in innings	0	0	7	1
10 wickets in match	0	0	2	0
Best bowling	3/36	2/31	6/34	5/41
Catches/stumpings	4/–	1/–	21/–	10/–
Medal record
Representing New Zealand
Men's Cricket
Commonwealth Games
Bronze medal – third place	1998 Kuala Lumpur	List-A cricket
- Source: Cricinfo, 18 April 2017

Christopher James Drum (born 10 July 1974) is a former New Zealand cricketer who played in five Test matches and five One Day Internationals from 1999 to 2002. Drum attended Rosmini College in Auckland.

== Domestic career ==
Drum played for the Auckland cricket team between 1996 and 2002. He ended his career with 199 first class wickets and 74 limited overs wickets in the domestic competitions.

== International career ==
Drum made his debut for New Zealand against Pakistan in the March 2001, in the second test match. The match was played at Jade stadium. He became the third bowler to take a wicket with his first legitimate ball in Test cricket at this ground when he had Ijaz Ahmed stepping on his wicket before completing his shot. On 14 January 1999, he made his ODI debut against India and taking his first One Day International wicket by dismissing Sachin Tendulkar .

Drum was also a member of the New Zealand squad that won a bronze medal at the 1998 Commonwealth Games, which was the only time cricket was included in Commonwealth games. He played his last Test match in April 2002, and retired from all forms of cricket soon afterwards at the relatively young age of 28.
