= Andrew Penn (cricketer) =

New Zealand cricketer (born 1974)

Personal information
- Full name: Andrew Jonathan Penn
- Born: 27 July 1974 (age 52); Wanganui, New Zealand
- Batting: Right-handed
- Bowling: Right-arm fast-medium

International information
- National side: New Zealand (1997–2001)
- ODI debut (cap 101): 27 March 1997 v Sri Lanka
- Last ODI: 31 January 2001 v Sri Lanka

Domestic team information
- Years: Team
- 1994/95–1999/00: Central Districts
- 2000/01–2003/04: Wellington

Career statistics
Competition	ODI	FC	LA
Matches	5	66	60
Runs scored	23	1,276	546
Batting average	11.50	18.49	14.75
100s/50s	0/0	0/6	0/1
Top score	15	90	63
Balls bowled	159	12,638	2,813
Wickets	1	252	88
Bowling average	201.00	23.03	25.48
5 wickets in innings	0	11	3
10 wickets in match	0	2	0
Best bowling	1/50	8/21	7/28
Catches/stumpings	1/–	15/–	16/–
- Source: Cricinfo, 20 April 2017

Andrew Jonathan Penn (born 27 July 1974) is a New Zealand cricketer who played five One Day Internationals for New Zealand between 1997 and 2001. He played first-class cricket for Central Districts and Wellington from 1995 to 2003.

Penn made three overseas tours with New Zealand. This is the record for the most tours with a Test-playing team in a complete career without ever playing in a Test. Penn also played for Wanganui in the Hawke Cup.

Penn works as a solicitor in property and commercial law. He is a principal at Whanganui law firm Treadwell Gordon.
