= Types of bowlers in cricket =

In the sport of cricket there are two broad categories of bowlers: pace and spin. Pace bowlers rely mostly on the speed of the ball to dismiss batsmen, whereas spin bowlers rely on the rotation and turn of the ball to deceive the batter.

== Pace bowlers ==
Pace bowlers, or fast bowlers or pacemen, rely on speed to get a batter out. This type of bowler can be further classified according to the speed at which they bowl the ball on average.

Most pace bowlers are medium-fast to fast in top level cricket. In general, bowlers of this type are described as right-arm or left-arm "fast" or "medium-fast". Another technique of fast bowling is the sling action. This action generates extra speed but sacrifices control. Exponents include Jeff Thomson, Waqar Younis, Lasith Malinga, Mitchell Johnson, Fidel Edwards, Shaun Tait and Jasprit Bumrah.

Though there may have been faster balls bowled, the highest electronically measured speed (after speed guns became popular) for a ball bowled by any bowler is 161.3 km/h (100.23 mph), bowled by Pakistan's Shoaib Akhtar to England's Nick Knight on 22 February 2003 in a World Cup match at Newlands, Cape Town, South Africa; this was also the first ball ever officially measured to break the 100 mph barrier.

=== Swing bowlers ===
Swing bowlers are pace bowlers who, apart from being fast, also use the seam of the ball to make it travel in a curved path through the air. This is further encouraged by systematically polishing one side of the ball while allowing the other side to become roughened and worn. The differing airflow around the two sides will cause the ball to swing in the air, towards the roughened side. By changing the orientation of the ball in his hand, a bowler may therefore cause the ball to swing into or away from the batter. In addition to a well-polished ball, other factors help the ball to swing, notably damp or humid weather conditions. However balls which have been in play for some time do not tend to swing so much due to the deterioration of the seam. In addition, bowlers of express pace do not tend to get as much swing as the fast-medium-to-medium pace bowlers.

Reverse swing as the name suggests, moves in the opposite direction to conventional swing. Instead of the ball drifting towards its rougher side, it veers towards the smooth. Typically, a ball needs to be older, and thoroughly knocked about, before it arrives in “the zone” to reverse; and it takes a faster bowler to inject enough velocity that the effect will take hold. Sarfraz Nawaz and Imran Khan are credited as two of the earliest exponents of reverse-swing in International cricket. Waqar Younis and Wasim Akram perfected the art of reverse-swing and inspired many to learn the art.

An outswinger is a type of delivery of the ball in the sport of cricket. In such a delivery the ball curves—or "swings"—out and away from the batter's body and the wicket. By contrast, an inswinger swings in toward the batter and the wicket. Wasim Akram, Richard Hadlee, Malcolm Marshall, Curtly Ambrose, Courtney Walsh, Dominic Cork, Dale Steyn and James Anderson are some of the bowlers who had the best outswingers of their time.

=== Other tactics ===
Pace bowlers frequently dismiss batsmen through variation and deception. A batter who has been "softened up" by a series of bouncers, which pitch nearer the bowler than normal and reach the batsman around head height, or even hit the batsman, may tend to play the next ball on the back foot, and thus be susceptible to a full-length yorker delivery that bounces at his toes. Many bowlers also develop a seam bowling and "slower ball"; these are bowled with the same arm action as their normal delivery, but come slower from the hand, usually due to the bowler gripping the ball differently or cocking his wrist at the last moment. With luck, the batsman will misread the pace, and will have finished his shot before the ball arrives. Other common variations include the leg cutter and off cutter, medium pace deliveries bowled with a spinner's wrist action, which can sometimes "turn" just like deliveries from a spinner. Steve Waugh is often credited as the bowler who pioneered and popularized the back of the hand slower deliveries and change of pace in order to baffle the batsmen.

== Spin bowlers ==
Spin bowlers or spinners impart rotation to the ball to get a batter out. The spin on the ball makes its movement hard to predict, particularly when it bounces, hence spin bowlers try to deceive batsmen into making a mistake. Speed is not crucial in spin bowling, and spinners tend to bowl in the slow-medium to medium-slow range, around 45–55 mph. There are two broad categories of spin bowling: wrist spin and finger spin.

=== Wrist spin ===
Wrist spinners are bowlers who use their wrists to spin the ball. A right-handed wrist spinner is known as a leg spinner and his or her mode of bowling is known as leg break. A leg break will move from right to left from the bowler's point of view, or from the leg-side to the off-side for a right-handed batsman. Some of the most successful wrist spinners include Shane Warne from Australia, Anil Kumble from India and Rashid Khan from Afghanistan.

Left-handed wrist spinners, who are much rarer than right-handed wrist-spinners, are called Left-arm unorthodox spin bowlers. This form of delivery was historically often termed a chinaman after an early left-arm finger spinner of Chinese descent, Ellis Achong, who sometimes bowled wrist spinners as a variation while playing for the West Indies. This term has fallen out of fashion. A ball delivered in this way will spin from the off-side to the leg-side for a right-handed batsman. Paul Adams and Tabraiz Shamsi of South Africa, as well as Kuldeep Yadav from India, are the best-known recent left-arm unorthodox bowlers. Former Australian one-day all-rounder Brad Hogg is another exponent of left-arm wrist-spin, as were his teammates Simon Katich and Beau Casson.

=== Finger spin ===
Finger spinners make use of their fingers to rotate the ball. A right-arm finger spinner is known as an off-spinner and their mode of bowling is known as off break. The ball will appear to move just as the left-arm unorthodox ball does, from off to leg for a right-handed batsman. Muttiah Muralitharan (often called "Murali") of Sri Lanka and Graeme Swann of England, two of the most successful bowlers in Test and ODI cricket history, are off-spinners. Murali's bowling style is unique, while Swann's is more conventional. Indian Ravichandran Ashwin and Pakistanis Saqlain Mushtaq and Saeed Ajmal are amongst contemporary bowlers of this type, who also employ this bowling style. Saqlain Mushtaq invented a new delivery with this style of bowling called "Doosra", this delivery is bowled with almost same action as off break however it spins like a leg break or goes straight on with the angle of the delivery. This delivery has become one of the most effective deliveries in an off spin bowler's variety of deliveries, but in recent times, many off-spinners have been reported for throwing as a result of bowling the doosra. This delivery has been employed by other famous bowlers after Saqlain Mushtaq, such as Murali and Saeed Ajmal. Another type of delivery, the carrom ball, was invented in the 1940s but largely vanished by the 1970s before being revived in the early 21st century by Sri Lanka's Ajantha Mendis; Ashwin also uses this delivery as a second style.

Almost all left-handed bowlers are finger spinners. As a result, this style has no fixed name and the bowling mode is simply known as (slow) left-arm orthodox. The ball turns like a leg break, from leg to off. Shakib Al Hasan of Bangladesh, New Zealand's Daniel Vettori, Sri Lanka's Rangana Herath, and Axar Patel and Ravindra Jadeja from India employ this bowling style.

== "Mixed" bowlers ==
A bowler equally skilled in both types of bowling is known as a mixed bag or an all round bowler. Such bowlers are rare. The great West Indian all rounder Sir Garfield Sobers bowled effectively in the left-arm fast-medium, left-arm orthodox, and left-arm unorthodox styles. Sachin Tendulkar, known primarily as a batsman, bowled right arm medium fast in his starting days and later changed his bowling style into both right arm leg break and off break.

== Abbreviations ==
Bowling styles are often abbreviated in scorecards as follows :

Right-arm pace bowling	RF/RAF	Right-arm fast
Right-arm pace bowling	RFM/RAFM	Right-arm fast-medium
Right-arm pace bowling	RMF/RAMF	Right-arm medium-fast
Right-arm pace bowling	RM/RAM	Right-arm medium
Right-arm pace bowling	RMS/RAMS	Right-arm medium-slow
Right-arm pace bowling	RSM/RASM	Right-arm slow-medium
Right-arm pace bowling	RS/RAS	Right-arm slow

Left-arm pace bowling	LF/LAF	Left-arm fast
Left-arm pace bowling	LFM/LAFM	Left-arm fast-medium
Left-arm pace bowling	LMF/LAMF	Left-arm medium-fast
Left-arm pace bowling	LM/LAM	Left-arm medium
Left-arm pace bowling	LMS/LAMS	Left-arm medium-slow
Left-arm pace bowling	LSM/LASM	Left-arm slow-medium
Left-arm pace bowling	LS/LAS	Left-arm slow

Right-arm spin bowling	OB	Off break
Right-arm spin bowling	LB	Leg break
Right-arm spin bowling	LBG	Leg break googly

Left-arm spin bowling	SLA	Slow left-arm orthodox
Left-arm spin bowling	SLH	Slow left-arm heterodox
Left-arm spin bowling	LAG	Left-arm googly
