= Outswinger =

An outswinger is a type of delivery of the ball in the sport of cricket. In such a delivery the ball curves—or "swings"—out and away from the batter's body and the wicket. By contrast, an inswinger swings in toward the batter and the wicket. Outswingers are bowled by swing bowlers. The earliest known use of the term is from 1920.

The term has also been adopted into football commentary, in which context it describes a cross of the ball kicked so that it curves outward from and across the face of the goal, rather than on goal.

== Method ==
An outswinger is bowled by holding the cricket ball with the seam at an angle and the first two fingers running along either side of the seam. The ball must be released at 12 o'clock height. The hands should move slightly towards the left at follow through and must push down for more back-spin. Once the ball has worn on one side the shiny side should face the leg side and the seam towards first or second slip for swing. The difference of pressure caused by movement of air over the rough and smooth surfaces tends to push the ball to the left. The result is that the ball curves, or swings to the left. In case of a new ball point the seam to the direction of swing. The difference of the separation of air by the seam the ball moves away from the batter.

== Advantages ==
From a right-handed batter's point of view, the swing is away from his body towards his right, i.e. towards the off side. This swing away from the body is the source of the name outswinger. To a left-handed batter, the swing is in towards the body and towards the leg side which from a technical point of view makes the outswinger, now an inswinger.

Outswingers may be considered to be one of the more difficult fast deliveries for a right-handed batter to play. This is because the ball moves away from his body. This means that any miscalculation can result in an outside edge off the bat and a catch going to the wicket-keeper or slips fielders.

== Tactical use ==
To a right-handed batter, a fast bowler will generally concentrate on bowling repeated outswingers, aiming to tempt the batter to play away from his body and get him out in one of the ways described above. However, sometimes a fast bowler may attempt to deceive the batter by bowling an off cutter instead of a standard outswinger, and look to get a batter out either bowled or lbw. More commonly, variation is in the length of the ball, with yorkers and bouncers. An effective delivery length is one that places the ball approaching the top of the stumps; usually between two-thirds to three- quarters up the length of the pitch.

== Scientific analysis ==
Outswingers and inswingers have been scientifically analysed using the techniques of fluid dynamics and aerodynamics of the cricket ball.

== See also ==
- Inswinger
- Leg cutter
- Off cutter
- Reverse swing
