= List of international cricket five-wicket hauls by Waqar Younis =

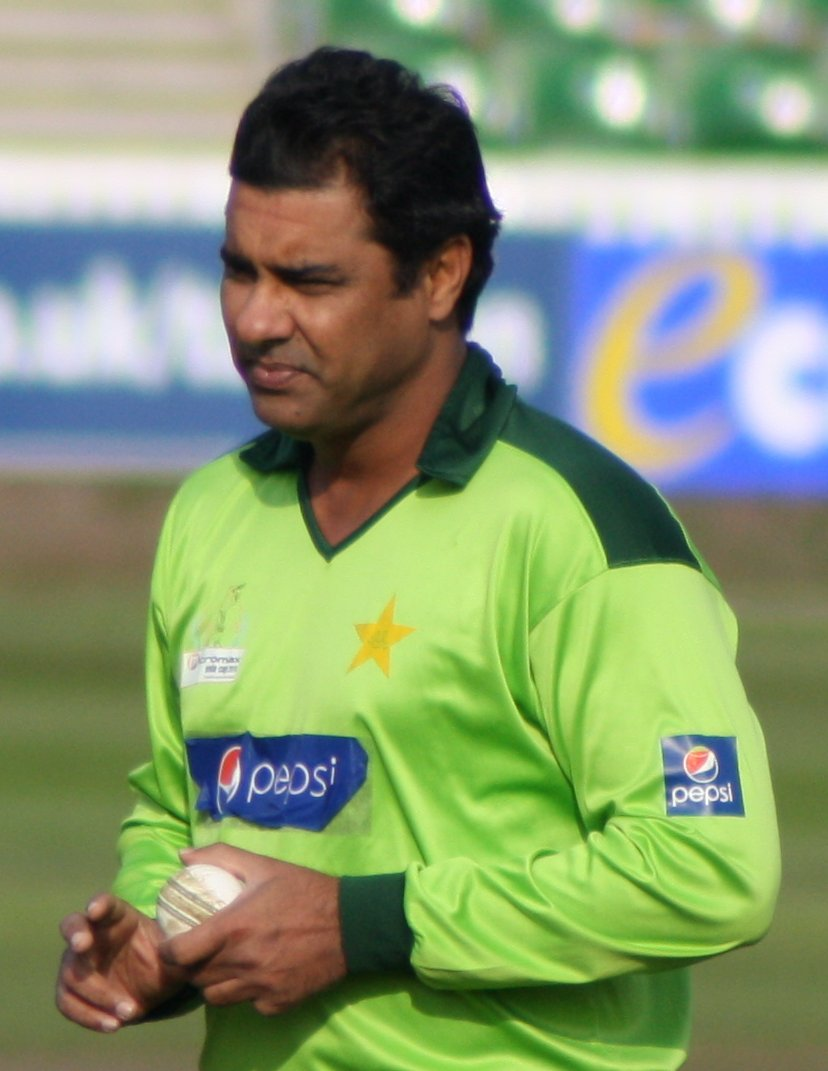
Former Pakistan captain, Waqar Younis

Waqar Younis, a retired Pakistani cricketer, took 35 five-wicket hauls during his career in international cricket. In cricket, a five-wicket haul (also known as a "five–for" or "fifer") refers to a bowler taking five or more wickets in a single innings. This is regarded as a notable achievement, as of October 2024, only 54 bowlers have taken 15 or more five-wicket hauls at international level in their cricketing careers. A right-arm fast bowler who represented his country between 1989 and 2003, the BBC described Waqar as "one of the most feared fast bowlers in recent cricketing history", while former Pakistan captain Imran Khan said that Waqar was "a thinking cricketer and, at his peak, he was the most destructive bowler the game had seen". The cricket almanack Wisden noted his "pace and swing", and named him one of their Cricketers of the Year in 1992. Waqar was inducted into the ICC Hall of Fame on 9 December 2013.

Waqar made his Test debut in 1989 against India in Karachi, where he took four wickets in the first innings. His first Test five-wicket haul came the following year against New Zealand in a match which Pakistan won at Gaddafi Stadium, Lahore. He took a pair of five-wicket hauls in a single match against Zimbabwe at the Defence Stadium, Karachi in December 1993. His career-best figures for an innings were 7 wickets for 76 runs against New Zealand at Iqbal Stadium, Faisalabad, in October 1990. He went on to take ten or more wickets per match on five occasions.

Making his One Day International (ODI) debut in October 1989 against West Indies at the Sharjah Cricket Association Stadium (Sharjah), Waqar's first ODI five-wicket haul came the following year against Sri Lanka in a match which Pakistan won at the Sharjah. He achieved a hat-trick (three wickets in consecutive deliveries), against New Zealand in 1994. His career-best bowling in ODI cricket was 7 wickets for 36 runs, against England at Headingley in June 2001. He took three consecutive five-wicket hauls in ODI matches in November 1990. Retiring from international cricket in 2003 after nearly 14 years, Waqar took 22 five-wicket hauls in Test cricket and 13 in ODIs. As of November 2020, he is joint sixth (with Rangana Herath) overall among all-time combined five-wicket haul takers, and top of the equivalent ODI list.

== Key ==
Symbol	Meaning
Date	Day the Test started or ODI held
Inn	Innings in which five-wicket haul was taken
Overs	Number of overs bowled
Runs	Number of runs conceded
Wkts	Number of wickets taken
Econ	Runs conceded per over
Batsmen	Batsmen whose wickets were taken
Result	Result for the Pakistan team
*	One of two five-wicket hauls by Waqar in a match
†	10 or more wickets taken in the match
‡	Waqar was selected as man of the match

== Tests ==
Five-wicket hauls in Test cricket by Waqar Younis
No.	Date	Ground	Against	Inn	Overs	Runs	Wkts	Econ	Batsmen	Result
1	18 October 1990 † ‡	Gaddafi Stadium, Lahore	New Zealand	3	37.5	86	7	2.27	David White; Mark Greatbatch; Danny Morrison; Ken Rutherford; Grant Bradburn; Ian Smith; Chris Pringle	Won
2	26 October 1990 * † ‡	Iqbal Stadium, Faisalabad	New Zealand	2	30.2	76	7	2.50	Trevor Franklin; Mark Greatbatch; Ken Rutherford; Dipak Patel; Danny Morrison; Grant Bradburn; Willie Watson	Won
3	26 October 1990 * †‡	Iqbal Stadium, Faisalabad	New Zealand	4	23.5	54	5	2.26	Phil Horne; Martin Crowe; Ian Smith; Chris Pringle; Willie Watson	Won
4	15 November 1990	National Stadium, Karachi	West Indies	1	22	76	5	3.45	Gordon Greenidge; Carl Hooper; Jeff Dujon; Malcolm Marshall; Curtly Ambrose	Won
5	23 November 1990	Iqbal Stadium, Faisalabad	West Indies	2	16	46	5	2.87	Gordon Greenidge; Carlisle Best; Carl Hooper; Gus Logie; Curtly Ambrose	Lost
6	12 December 1991	Jinnah Stadium, Sialkot	Sri Lanka	1	30.5	84	5	2.72	Athula Samarasekera; Aravinda de Silva; Hashan Tillakaratne; Rumesh Ratnayake; Pramodya Wickramasinghe	Drawn
7	2 January 1992	Iqbal Stadium, Faisalabad	Sri Lanka	3	17	65	5	3.82	Roshan Mahanama; Chandika Hathurusingha; Aravinda de Silva; Kapila Wijegunawardene; Sanath Jayasuriya	Won
8	18 June 1992	Lord's, London	England	1	21	91	5	4.33	Graeme Hick; Allan Lamb; Ian Botham; Chris Lewis; Phillip DeFreitas	Won
9	23 July 1992	Headingley, Leeds	England	2	30	117	5	3.90	Alec Stewart; Graeme Hick; Chris Lewis; Derek Pringle; Neil Mallender	Lost
10	6 August 1992	Kennington Oval, London	England	4	18	52	5	2.88	Graham Gooch; Alec Stewart; Michael Atherton; David Gower; Devon Malcolm	Won
11	2 January 1993	Trust Bank Park, Hamilton	New Zealand	4	13.3	22	5	1.62	Andrew Jones; Rod Latham; Chris Harris; Murphy Su'a; Dipak Patel	Won
12	1 May 1993	Antigua Recreation Ground, St John's, Antigua	West Indies	1	28	104	5	3.71	Richie Richardson; Keith Arthurton; Junior Murray; Anderson Cummins; Winston Benjamin	Drawn
13	1 December 1993 * † ‡	Defence Stadium, Karachi	Zimbabwe	2	34.1	91	7	2.66	Grant Flower; Mark Dekker; David Houghton; Glen Bruk-Jackson; Stephen Peall; Heath Streak; John Rennie	Won
14	1 December 1993 * † ‡	Defence Stadium, Karachi	Zimbabwe	4	21.5	44	6	2.01	Mark Dekker; David Houghton; Glen Bruk-Jackson; Stephen Peall; Eddo Brandes; John Rennie	Won
15	9 December 1993‡	Rawalpindi Cricket Stadium, Rawalpindi	Zimbabwe	2	19	88	5	4.63	Mark Dekker; Andy Flower; Heath Streak; Glen Bruk-Jackson; David Brain	Won
16	16 December 1993	Gaddafi Stadium, Lahore	Zimbabwe	2	34.4	100	5	2.88	Alistair Campbell; David Houghton; Wayne James; Heath Streak; John Rennie	Drawn
17	24 February 1994	Lancaster Park, Christchurch	New Zealand	2	19	78	6	4.10	Blair Hartland; Ken Rutherford; Shane Thomson; Tony Blain; Simon Doull; Chris Pringle	Lost
18	26 August 1994 * † ‡	Asgiriya Stadium, Kandy	Sri Lanka	1	14	34	6	2.42	Roshan Mahanama; Sanjeeva Ranatunga; Arjuna Ranatunga; Hashan Tillakaratne; Kumar Dharmasena; Chaminda Vaas	Won
19	26 August 1994 * † ‡	Asgiriya Stadium, Kandy	Sri Lanka	3	18	85	5	4.72	Roshan Mahanama; Dulip Samaraweera; Pubudu Dassanayake; Sanjeeva Ranatunga; Arjuna Ranatunga	Won
20	6 March 1998†	St George's Park, Port Elizabeth	South Africa	1	23	78	6	3.39	Adam Bacher; Gary Kirsten; Jacques Kallis; H. D. Ackerman; Hansie Cronje; Fanie de Villiers	Lost
21	14 March 1998	Queens Sports Club, Bulawayo	Zimbabwe	1	28.2	106	5	3.74	Dirk Viljoen; Murray Goodwin; Guy Whittall; Trevor Madondo; Pommie Mbangwa	Drawn
22	9 January 2002	Bangabandhu National Stadium, Dhaka	Bangladesh	1	16.2	55	6	3.36	Habibul Bashar; Khaled Mashud; Sanwar Hossain; Fahim Muntasir; Mohammad Sharif; Enamul Haque	Drawn

== One Day Internationals ==
Five-wicket hauls in ODI cricket by Waqar Younis
No.	Date	Ground	Against	Inn	Overs	Runs	Wkts	Econ	Batsmen	Result
1	29 April 1990	Sharjah Cricket Association Stadium, Sharjah	Sri Lanka	2	10	26	6	2.60	Hashan Tillakaratne; Aravinda de Silva; Brendon Kuruppu; Rumesh Ratnayake; Uvais Karnain; Ravi Ratnayeke	Won
2	1 May 1990 ‡	Sharjah Cricket Association Stadium, Sharjah (neutral venue)	New Zealand	1	9	20	5	2.22	Ken Rutherford; Shane Thomson; Ian Smith; Martin Snedden; Danny Morrison	Won
3	4 November 1990	Arbab Niaz Stadium, Peshawar	New Zealand	1	6.4	11	5	1.65	David White; Martin Crowe; Ken Rutherford; Dipak Patel; Danny Morrison	Won
4	6 November 1990	Jinnah Stadium, Sialkot	New Zealand	2	6	16	5	2.66	Dipak Patel; Grant Bradburn; Mark Priest; Chris Pringle; Willie Watson	Won
5	9 November 1990 ‡	National Stadium, Karachi	West Indies	2	8	52	5	6.50	Desmond Haynes; Richie Richardson; Gus Logie; Brian Lara; Carl Hooper	Won
6	9 February 1993 ‡	Kingsmead, Durban	South Africa	2	10	25	5	2.50	Andrew Hudson; Hansie Cronje; Daryll Cullinan; Craig Matthews; Fanie de Villiers	Won
7	13 March 1994 ‡	Eden Park, Auckland	New Zealand	2	9.4	30	6	3.10	Bryan Young; Blair Hartland; Shane Thomson; Gavin Larsen; Matthew Hart; Richard de Groen	Tied
8	4 October 1996 ‡	Gymkhana Club Ground, Nairobi (neutral venue)	Sri Lanka	2	8.5	52	5	5.88	Sanath Jayasuriya; Romesh Kaluwitharana; Asanka Gurusinha; Roshan Mahanama; Chaminda Vaas	Tied
9	13 November 1996 ‡	Sharjah Cricket Association Stadium, Sharjah	New Zealand	1	10	44	6	4.40	Adam Parore; Nathan Astle; Chris Cairns; Mark Greatbatch; Chris Harris; Dipak Patel	Won
10	26 March 2000	Sharjah Cricket Association Stadium, Sharjah	India	2	10	31	5	3.10	Sourav Ganguly; Sunil Joshi; Mohammad Azharuddin; Ajay Jadeja; Ajit Agarkar	Won
11	17 June 2001 ‡	Headingley, Leeds	England	1	10	36	7	3.60	Marcus Trescothick; Nick Knight; Alec Stewart; Michael Vaughan; Owais Shah; Paul Collingwood; Dominic Cork	Won
12	19 June 2001 ‡	Trent Bridge, Nottingham	Australia	2	8	59	6	7.37	Mark Waugh; Matthew Hayden; Michael Bevan; Steve Waugh; Andrew Symonds; Brett Lee	Won
13	12 August 2002	National Cricket Stadium, Tangier	South Africa	2	10	38	5	3.80	Gary Kirsten; Jacques Kallis; Lance Klusener; Mark Boucher; Shaun Pollock	Lost
