= Toe-crushers =

Toecrushers is an alternative name for yorker deliveries (usually inswinging ones) in cricket. This term was probably first used by TV commentators in early 1990s to describe the frequent inswinging yorkers bowled by Pakistani fast bowlers Wasim Akram and Waqar Younis. Younis has also been called the toe-crusher due to his iconic late in-swinging yorkers.

Toe crushers are said to be much more difficult to play as the ball nips in just before it lands giving it a higher chance for the batsman to miss and get bowled while trying to defend or hit it.
