= Seam bowling =

Bowling technique in cricket

Seam bowling is a bowling technique in cricket, in which the ball is deliberately bowled to hit the ground on its seam, to cause a random deviation when it bounces. A bowler who uses this technique is called a seam bowler or seamer.

Seam bowling is a form of fast bowling, although seam can also be a factor in medium-pace bowling. Although there are specialist seamers that make deliberate use of off cutter and leg cutter at the expense of bowling slower than regular fast bowlers, most bowlers employ the seam to some effect and so the terms "seamer" and "fast bowler" are largely synonymous. This was far less the case in the past, even the recent past. Bowlers such as Tom Cartwright and Derek Shackleton bowled seamers at a pace in the low 70mphs and were very successful due to their mastery of control and variation.

== Physics ==
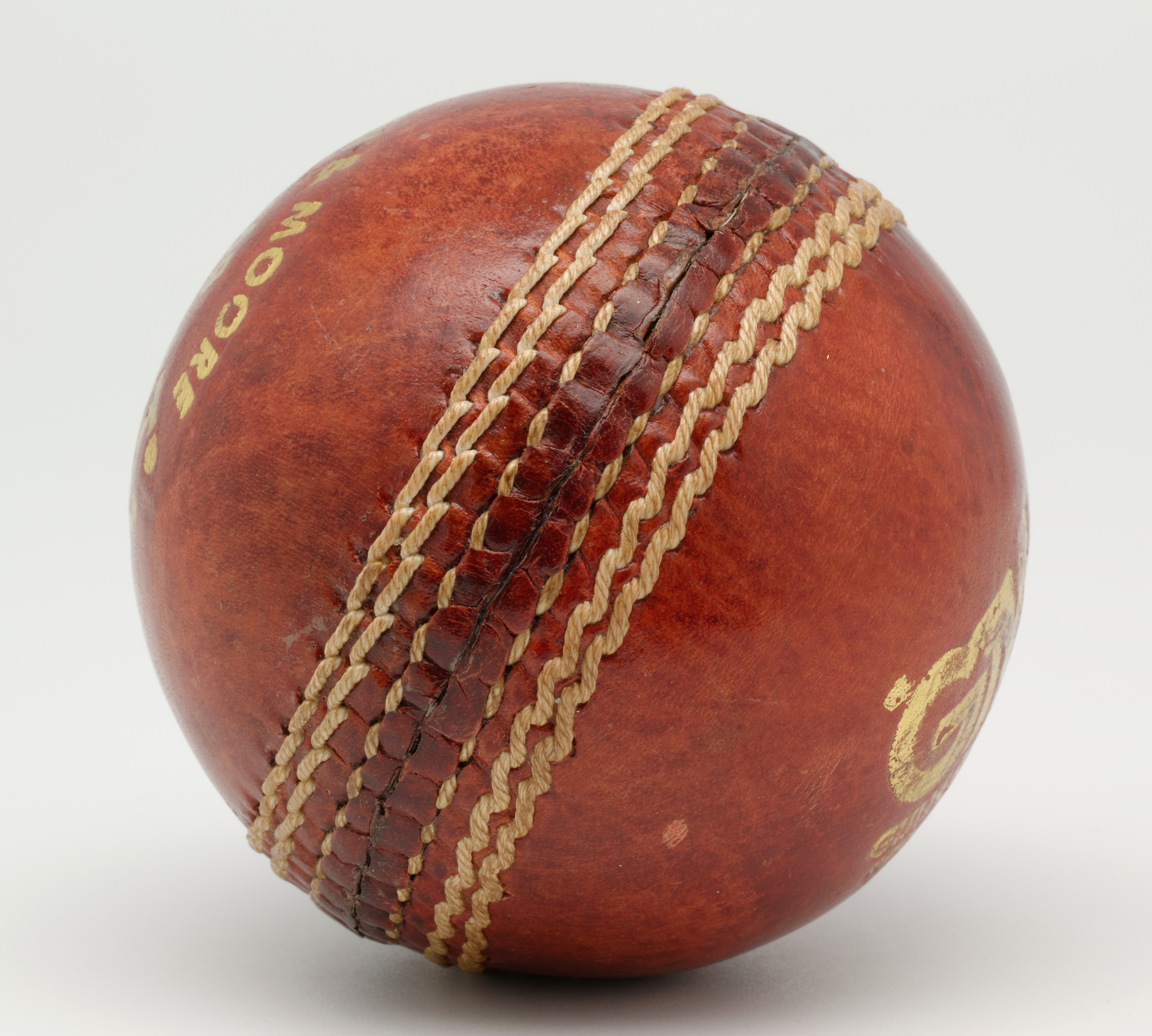
The seam on a cricket ball.

A cricket ball is not a perfect sphere. The seam of the ball is the circular stitching which joins the two halves of the cricket ball. Hence, the seam joining the pieces of leather is circumferential and the stitching is noticeably raised. If the ball is bowled in such a way that the seam hits the pitch when it bounces, this irregularity can cause the ball to deviate sideways in its path. It may move in any direction, or just go straight. The batter has to see how the ball moves after pitching to select their shot.

In order to achieve this effect, a seam bowler usually delivers the ball with the seam held upright, with rotation about a horizontal axis. This keeps the seam aligned vertically as it travels towards the batter, making it likely that the ball will bounce with the seam on the pitch. Consistently hitting the seam is not as easy as it sounds. The seam has to be held upright between the index finger and the middle finger at the time of the delivery of the ball and, most importantly, the wrist has to be dead straight when the ball is delivered. The seam and wrist position of Australia's Glenn McGrath and India's Mohammed Shami are arguably a perfect example.

The direction and degree of the ball's deviation from a straight path are dependent on the small-scale alignment of the seam and any irregularities in the pitch surface. This means that deviation caused by seam is chaotic and unpredictable.

However, it is also possible, by holding the seam at an angle and rolling the fingers over the surface of the ball, to produce a deliberate off cutter in which the ball veers away from the off side when it bounces on the pitch, or leg cutter in which it veers away from a right-handed batter. Former Australian bowler Dennis Lillee employed a leg cutter of this sort to considerable effect; however, deliveries of this kind will be slower than if the bowler simply bowls with the seam upright, hoping for movement one way or the other. Some bowlers deliberately use cutters more for their surprise slowness than the deviation off the pitch.

Often the deviation caused by seam is not large enough to cause a batter significant problems with playing the ball. Occasionally, however, the ball can deviate far enough to hit the edge of the cricket bat instead of the middle, producing a catch for nearby fielders. Swing bowling is a way of getting greater deviation, but is harder to control.

Australian fast-medium bowler Glenn McGrath has used his seaming ability to great effect in his career. The ball 'seams' at its best at the start of a team's innings, when the ball is new. A pitch which has cracks in it may assist a seam bowler as well. The genuine 'Yorker' may be used by seam bowlers, but bounces ('pitches') so close to the batter's feet that it has no opportunity to deviate from its original line.

Another good example of seam bowling technique are the fast bowlers Courtney Walsh and Wasim Akram. Both used a forward wrist flick that imparted back-spin to the ball as it left the hand. However, significantly, their choice of finger position causes the ball to exhibit precession (similar to a gyroscope), with the seam remaining broadly upright but oscillating repeatedly between a 5 o'clock and 7 o'clock position (if viewed from the bottom of the seam). This effectively destroys seam induced swing (as the ball is constantly changing between outswing and inswing seam positions through the air). Thus, the ball travels straight onto the pitch (in theory allowing the bowler to be more accurate). However, when the seam of the ball contacts the pitch at the 5 o'clock position, the result is movement to the left (away to the right-handed batter), when the seam of the ball contacts the pitch at the 7 o'clock position, the result is movement to the right (in to the right-handed batter). It can be seen that only rarely would the ball be at the purely 6 o'clock position to continue completely straight after pitching. This aligns with the unpredictable nature of seam bowling, but appears primarily driven by the technique of the bowler, rather than irregularities in the pitch surface.

== See also ==
- Cricket terminology
- Swing bowling
