= Inswinger =

An inswinger is a type of delivery, in the sport of cricket, that curves—or "swings"—in toward the batter's body and the wicket. By contrast, an outswinger swings away from the line of the batter and the wicket. Inswingers are bowled by swing bowlers.

The term has also been adopted into football commentary, in which context it describes a cross of the ball kicked so that it curves in toward the goal.

== Grip ==
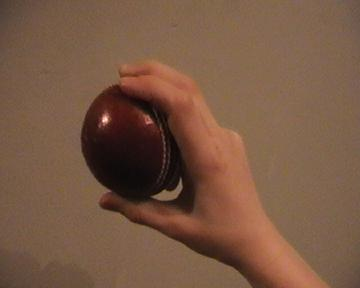

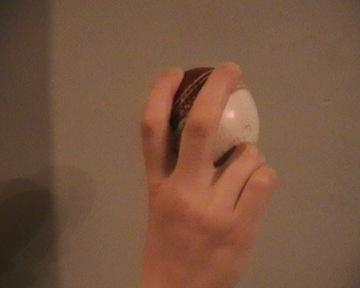

An inswinger is bowled by holding the cricket ball with the seam vertical and the first two fingers slightly across the seam so that it is angled a little to the leg side. Once the ball has worn and been polished so that one side is rougher than the other, the rough side is placed on the leg side. The ball is placed on the pad of the thumb. This thumb position locks the wrist in a position inclined to the leg side.

== Back foot contact ==
Inswing can be bowled from side-on, mid-way or chest on positions. But bowlers usually tend to pitch it in the good length spot or up to the batter. It is the wrist position that is crucial, not the position of hips or shoulders. (See thumb position above).

== Point of release ==
When the bowler delivers the ball, they angle the seam so that it points slightly to the leg side. To help achieve this position the bowling arm should be near vertical, brushing close to the ear. At release the wrist should remain cocked so as to help impart backspin along the orientation of the seam. The angle of the seam to the direction of motion produces an aerofoil effect as the ball moves through the air, pushing it to the leg side. This is enhanced by differential air pressure caused by movement of air over the rough and smooth surfaces, which also tends to push the ball to the leg side. The result is that the ball curves, or swings in to the batter.

== Use of the inswinger ==
Inswingers are not considered to be as difficult for a right-handed batter to play as an outswinger. This is because the ball moves in towards their body, meaning that their body is often behind the line of the ball, and any miscalculated shot that is hit by the edge of the bat may be intercepted by their body rather than flying to a fielder for a catch.

Inswingers can, however, sneak between the bat and pad to hit the wicket and bowl the batter out, or miss the bat and hit the pads for a leg before wicket. A particularly effective delivery is the inswinging yorker, which can cause a batter to attempt to pull their feet out of the line of the ball, leaving them vulnerable to being bowled, or out lbw if they are too slow. Another deceptive type are those pitched around the off-stump that appear to be passing the batmen by but swing in wildly to knock the stumps off. In the final match of the 1983 World Cup, Balwinder Sandhu famously clean bowled Gordon Greenidge with an inswinger to which the batsman had shouldered arms. Some famous bowlers to bowl inswingers include Bhuvneshwar Kumar, Mohammad Asif, James Anderson, and Stuart Broad.

== See also ==
- Outswinger
- Leg cutter
- Off cutter
