= Slip (cricket) =

Fielding position in cricket

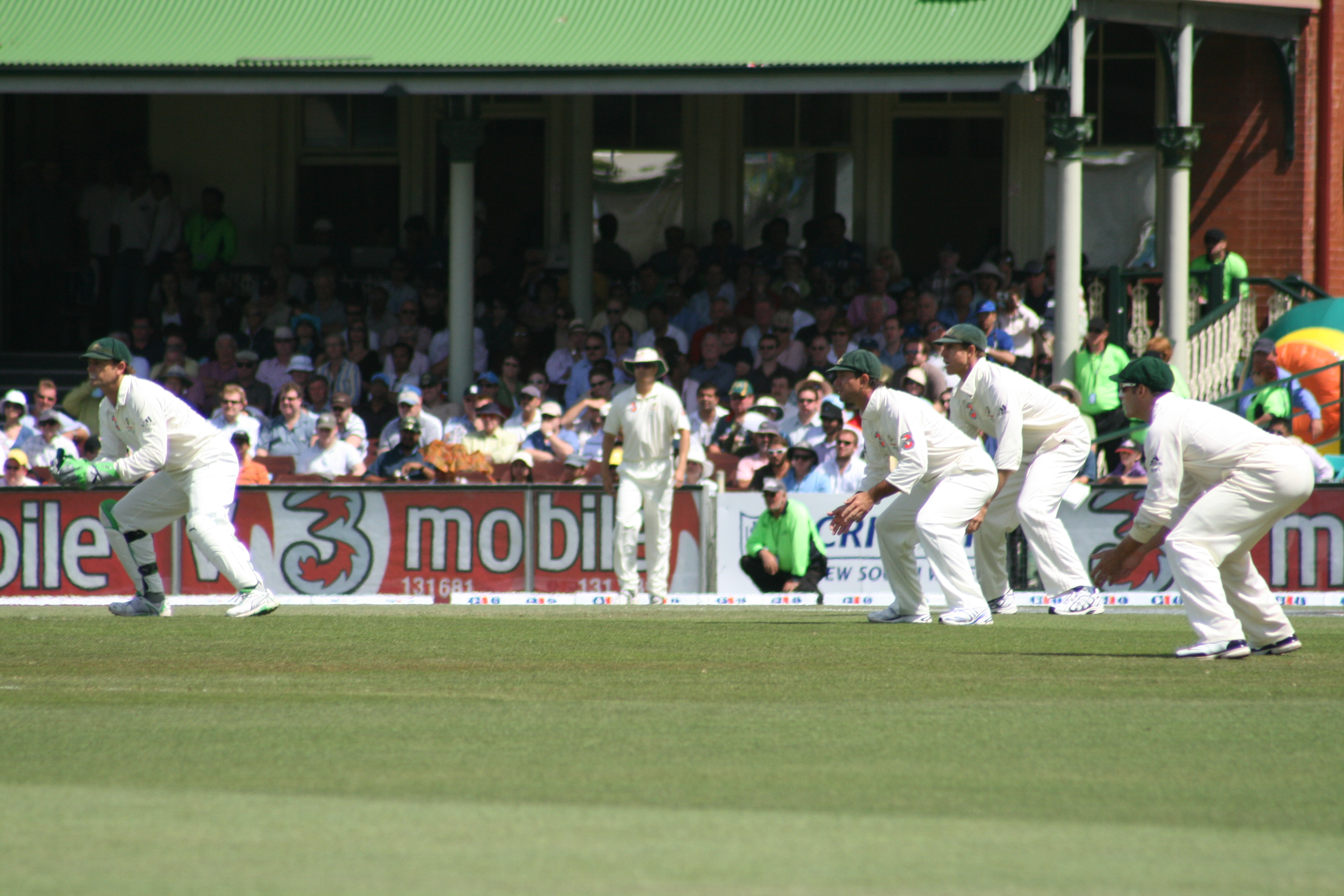
An orthodox slips cordon for a fast bowler, with slip fielders and wicket-keeper in characteristic partial squatting position.

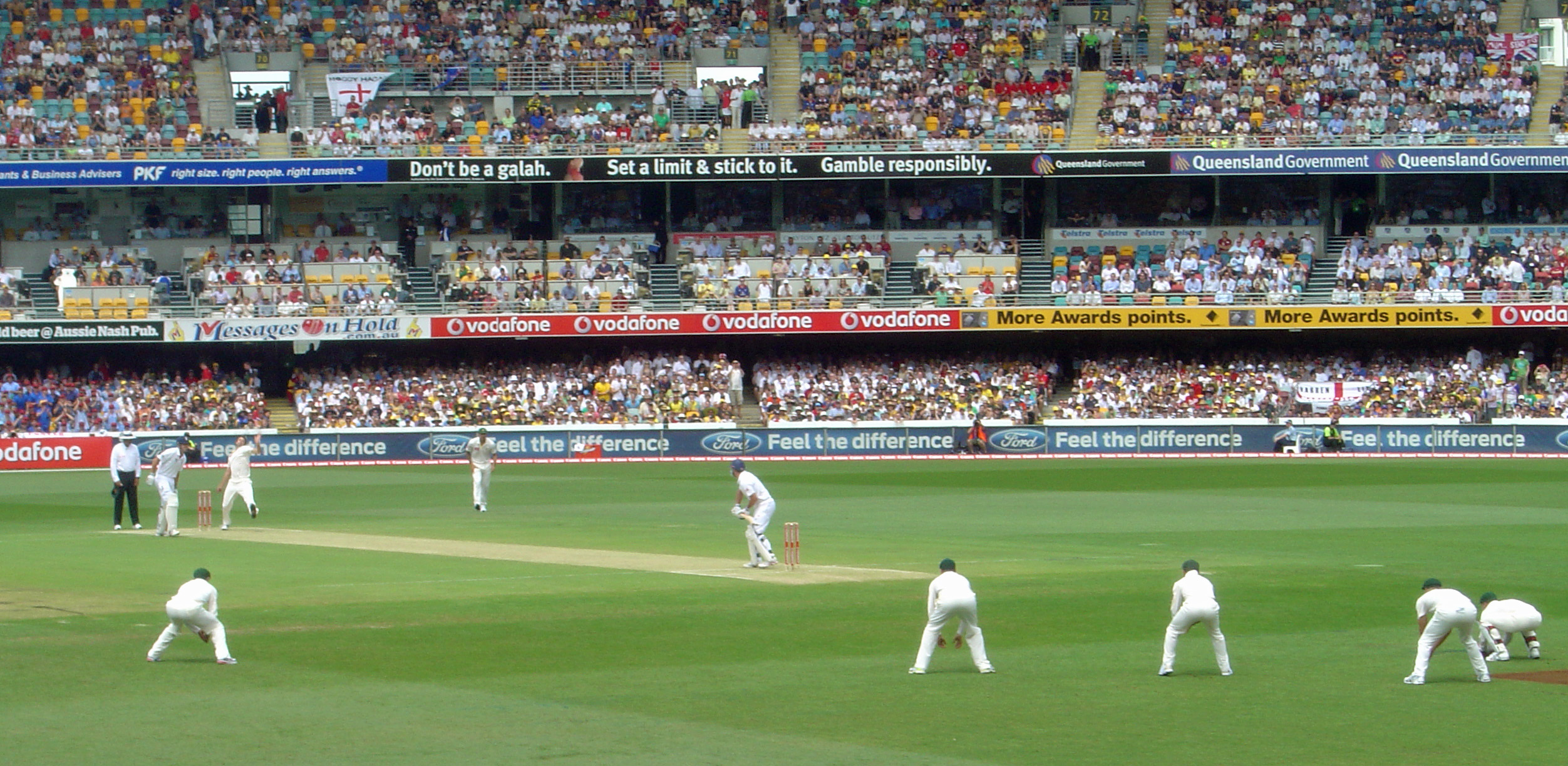
Three slips and a wicket-keeper (to the right). They are some distance from the batsman due to the pace of the bowler.

In cricket, a slip fielder (collectively, a slip cordon or the slips) is placed behind the batsman on the off side of the field. They are placed with the aim of catching an edged ball which is beyond the wicket-keeper's reach. Many teams employ two or three slips (numbered from the slip fielder closest to the wicket-keeper: first slip, second slip, etc.). A floating slip is sometimes employed, usually in limited over games, who patrols an area in the slip cordon that would ordinarily be occupied by more than one fielder. The slip cordon's distance from the batsman increases with the pace of the bowler; generally they will be marginally further away from the batsman than the wicket-keeper is. Because of the resulting geometry, spin bowlers generally have fewer slips in the cordon than a fast bowler would in an equivalent game situation. As fielding in the slips requires quick reflexes and sure hands, usually the most adept catchers in the team will make up the slip cordon. Most slip fielders are top order batsmen. Specialist slip fielders are sometimes called "slippers".

The term slips is also used to refer to the area of the field where the slip cordon stands, or n^{th} slip used specifically to refer to one slip fielder's position—e.g., a ball may be described as being edged through third slip if it goes where a third slip would otherwise have been.

== Origin of term ==
Writing in The Cricketers of My Time (1833), John Nyren of Hambledon hints at the origin of the word "slips" when he describes the function of a long stop as a fielder who is required to cover any slips from the bat, both to the leg and the off-side.

== Gully ==
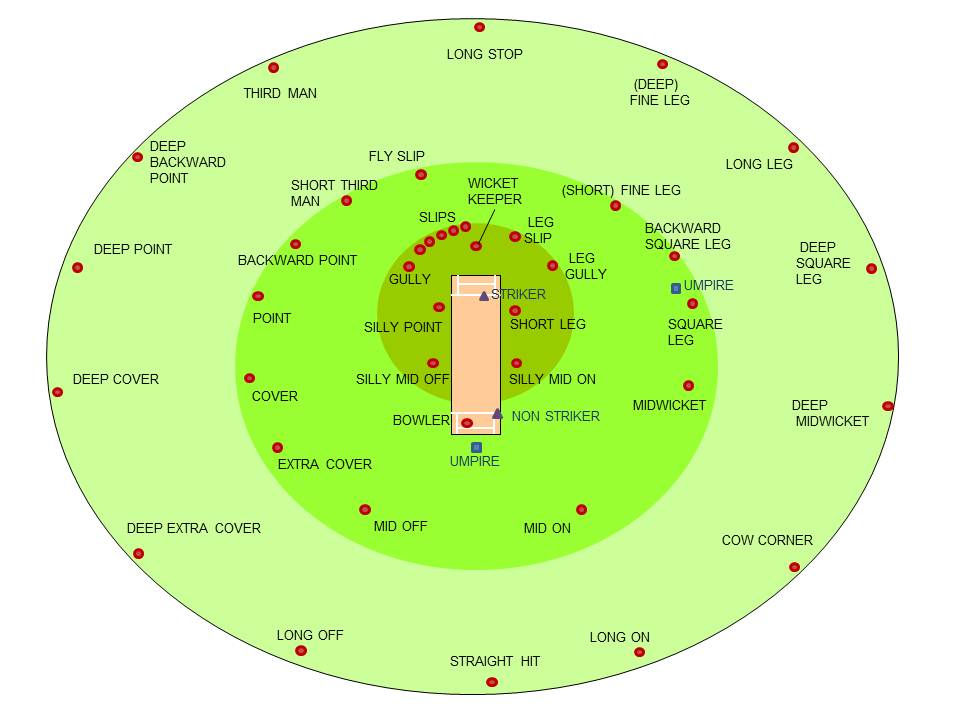
Fielding positions for a right-handed batsman, showing slips, gully and leg slip.

The gully fielder is an extension of the line of slips and fields almost square to the batsman; gully is also the name given to that area of the field. A fielder standing at gully would be standing on the imaginary straight line that extends from the on-side corner of batsman's popping crease to middle stump towards the slip cordon. The position of gully was invented in the 1880s by Arthur Jones, who later became England captain, at Bedford Modern School in Bedford. It was quickly adopted by EHD Sewell at Bedford School and then gained in popularity thereafter.

== Off theory ==
Enticing the batsman to edge and hit a catch to the wicket-keeper or slips is the standard wicket-taking tactic in off theory. To do so, the bowler tries to make the ball deviate off its expected line away from the batsman's body on the off-side. Outswingers or leg cutters, or the standard leg spinner are delivery types that have this effect. Unsurprisingly, bowlers bowling these deliveries effectively generally have larger slip cordons than those who are not.

On occasion, four or five slips are called for. England used seven slips in the first Test against West Indies in Jamaica in 2004; Australia went further and used the maximum of nine slips against Zimbabwe's lower order batsmen in a One Day International in 2001 (the two non-slips fieldsmen in this example were the wicket-keeper and the bowler).

== Leg slip ==
A fielder in the equivalent position on the on side of the wicket-keeper is known as a leg slip; this is considerably less common than the off-side slip, and for a team to employ more than one leg slip is highly unusual. It is illegal, under Law 41.5, to have more than two fielders in the area between square leg and long stop, to prevent the fielding team from making use of bodyline tactics.
