= 2021 Pakistan Super League players draft =

List of cricketers

The player draft for the sixth edition of the 2021 Pakistan Super League took place on 10 January 2021. Before the draft, the teams were allowed to retain a maximum of 8 players from the previous season and make any transfers that they saw necessary. More than 400 players from over 20 countries featured in the draft. From these players, the teams each selected 16 players along with 2 extra supplementary players to complete their 18-man squads. The draft was completed in late February, one month before the start of the main tournament, the 2021 Pakistan Super League (2021 PSL). Due to the suspension of the tournament because of COVID-19, a replacement draft was held.

== Background ==
The Pakistan Cricket Board (PCB) announced that the two-time champions Islamabad United would have the first pick, this was decided by a random draw. Before the draft, the PCB announced the renewal categories for all Pakistani players who played in the previous season. Soon after, the list of overseas players was released. Luke Ronchi was released from Islamabad United squad as he was announced as unable to participate due to his new role as New Zealand batting coach.

== Transfer and trade ==
On 9 January 2021, Alex Hales was announced as transferring from Karachi Kings to Islamabad United in exchange of Colin Ingram, who went the other way.

== Retained players ==
On 9 January 2021, the PCB announced the retention players list. All the teams were allowed to retain a maximum of 8 players from the previous season.

Class	Islamabad United	Karachi Kings	Lahore Qalandars	Multan Sultans	Peshawar Zalmi	Quetta Gladiators
Platinum	Shadab Khan; Alex Hales	Babar Azam; Mohammad Amir; Colin Ingram	Mohammad Hafeez; Shaheen Afridi	Shahid Afridi; Rilee Rossouw	Wahab Riaz; Shoaib Malik	Sarfaraz Ahmed
Diamond	Colin Munro; Faheem Ashraf	Imad Wasim	Fakhar Zaman (ambassador); David Wiese; Haris Rauf	Sohail Tanvir (ambassador); Imran Tahir (mentor); Khushdil Shah	Kamran Akmal	Ben Cutting; Mohammad Hasnain; Mohammad Nawaz
Gold	Hussain Talat (ambassador); Asif Ali	Aamer Yamin; Sharjeel Khan	Ben Dunk; Dilbar Hussain	James Vince; Shan Masood; Usman Qadir	Liam Livingstone; Haider Ali	Azam Khan; Naseem Shah
Silver	Muhammad Musa; Zafar Gohar	Waqas Maqsood (ambassador)	Sohail Akhtar			Zahid Mahmood (ambassador); Anwar Ali
Emerging		Arshad Iqbal				

== Draft picks ==
The draft took place on 10 January and over 400 players from 20 different countries registered. Islamabad United, the two-time champions, got the first pick in the opening round of the draft choosing wildcard Hasan Ali. Islamabad United were followed by Multan Sultans (second), Lahore Qalandars (third), Peshawar Zalmi (fourth), Quetta Gladiators (fifth) and Karachi Kings (sixth). After the draft, Shoaib Malik was involved in a car crash. He was said to be "perfectly all right". The category salaries were as follows:

- Platinum: US$130,000-US$170,000
- Diamond: US$60,000-US$85,000
- Gold: US$40,000-US$50,000
- Silver: US$15,000-US$25,000
- Emerging: US$7,500
- Supplementary: US$50,000

Class	Islamabad United	Karachi Kings	Lahore Qalandars	Multan Sultans	Peshawar Zalmi	Quetta Gladiators
Platinum	Hasan Ali		Rashid Khan	Chris Lynn	David Miller	Chris Gayle; Tom Banton
Diamond	Lewis Gregory	Mohammad Nabi; Dan Christian			Mujeeb Ur Rahman; Sherfane Rutherford	
Gold	Phil Salt	Chadwick Walton; Joe Clarke	Samit Patel		Amad Butt	Usman Shinwari
Silver	Rohail Nazir; Reece Topley; Iftikhar Ahmed	Danish Aziz; Mohammad Ilyas; Zeeshan Malik	Tom Abell; Zeeshan Ashraf; Agha Salman; Muhammad Faizan	Sohail Khan; Mohammad Rizwan; Sohaib Maqsood; Sohaibullah; Adam Lyth	Umaid Asif; Saqib Mahmood; Imam-ul-Haq; Mohammad Imran; Mohammad Irfan	Cameron Delport; Qais Ahmad; Abdul Nasir
Emerging	Mohammad Wasim; Ahmed Safi Abdullah	Qasim Akram	Maaz Khan; Muhammad Zaid	Shahnawaz Dahani; Mohammad Umar	Abrar Ahmed; Mohammad Imran	Saim Ayub; Arish Ali Khan
Supplementary	Chris Jordan; Akif Javed	Noor Ahmad; Abbas Afridi	Joe Denly; Ahmed Daniyal	Imran Khan; Carlos Brathwaite	Ravi Bopara; Mohammad Amir Khan	Dale Steyn; Usman Khan

== Replacements ==
Following players were replaced in PSL replacement draft.

Player	Team	Replaced with	Notes
Colin Munro (diamond)	Islamabad United	Fawad Ahmed	Unavailable for full competition due to quarantine issues
Chris Jordan (supplementary)	Islamabad United	Paul Stirling	Unavailable for full competition due to national duties
Reece Topley (silver)	Islamabad United	Ali Khan	Unavailable for full competition due to national duties
Liam Livingstone (gold)	Peshawar Zalmi	Tom Kohler-Cadmore	Unavailable for full competition due to national duties
Chris Gayle (platinum)	Quetta Gladiators	Faf du Plessis	Unavailable partially due to national duties
Rashid Khan (platinum)	Lahore Qalandars	Sandeep Lamichhane	Unavailable partially due to national duties
Dale Steyn (supplementary)	Quetta Gladiators	Hasan Khan	Unavailable partially for personal reasons
Akif Javed (supplementary)	Islamabad United	Zeeshan Zameer	Unavailable for full competition due to injury
Dilbar Hussain (gold)	Lahore Qalandars	Salman Mirza	Unavailable for full competition due to injury
David Miller (platinum)	Peshawar Zalmi	Waqar Salamkheil	Unavailable partially due to domestic duties

== Replacement Draft ==
In April 2021, the replacement draft for the postponed 2021 PSL took place.

Class	Islamabad United	Karachi Kings	Lahore Qalandars	Multan Sultans	Peshawar Zalmi	Quetta Gladiators
Platinum	Usman Khawaja	Martin Guptill	Shakib Al Hasan	Mahmudullah		Andre Russell
Diamond	Colin Munro	Thisara Perera; Najibullah Zadran	James Faulkner		Fabian Allen	
Gold	Janneman Malan		Joe Burns	Rahmanullah Gurbaz	Rovman Powell	
Silver		Liton Das	Callum Ferguson	George Linde	Fidel Edwards	
Supplementary			Seekkuge Prasanna	Obed McCoy		

== Mini Replacement Draft ==
After the 2021 PSL was once again postponed from May to June 2021, there was a Mini Replacement Draft.

Player	Team	Replacement	Notes
Ben Cutting	Quetta Gladiators	Zahir Khan	Unavailable for full competition due to quarantine issues
Mahmudullah Riyad	Multan Sultans	Shimron Hetmyer	Unavailable for full competition due to duties
Janneman Malan	Islamabad United	Brandon King	Unavailable for full competition due to duties
Shakib Al Hasan	Lahore Qalandars	Rashid Khan	Unavailable for full competition due to duties
Liton Das	Karachi Kings	Mohammad Haris	Unavailable for full competition due to duties
Obed McCoy	Multan Sultans	Blessing Muzarabani	Unavailable for full competition due to duties
Joe Burns	Lahore Qalandars	Tim David	Unavailable for full competition due to others reason
Shahid Afridi	Multan Sultans	Asif Afridi	Ruled out due to injury

== Partial replacements ==
Player	Team	Replacement	Notes
David Miller	Peshawar Zalmi	Hazratullah Zazai	Unavailable partially due to national team duties
Shimron Hetmyer	Multan Sultans	Johnson Charles	Unavailable partially due to national team duties
Fabian Allen	Peshawar Zalmi	Khalid Usman	Unavailable partially due to national team duties
Fidel Edwards	Peshawar Zalmi	Sameen Gul	Unavailable partially due to national team duties
Andre Russell	Quetta Gladiators	Zahoor Khan	Ruled out due to injury
