= Waqar Younis =

Pakistani cricketer (born 1971)

Waqar Younis HI
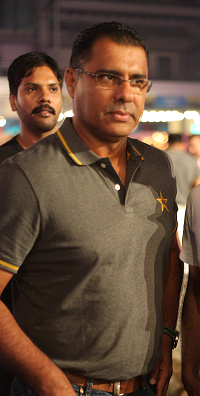
- Waqar Younis at the launch of PSL in 2015

Personal information
- Full name: Waqar Younis Maitla
- Born: 16 November 1971 (age 54); Vehari, Punjab, Pakistan
- Nickname: Toe Crusher
- Height: 6 ft (183 cm)
- Batting: Right-handed
- Bowling: Right-arm fast
- Role: Bowler
- Relatives: Aliya Riaz (sister-in-law)

International information
- National side: Pakistan (1989–2003)
- Test debut (cap 111): 15 November 1989 v India
- Last Test: 2 January 2003 v South Africa
- ODI debut (cap 71): 14 October 1989 v West Indies
- Last ODI: 4 March 2003 v Zimbabwe
- ODI shirt no.: 99

Domestic team information
- Years: Team
- 1987/88–1997/98: Multan
- 1988/89–1996/97: United Bank Limited
- 1990–1993: Surrey
- 1997–1998: Glamorgan
- 1998/99: Karachi
- 1998: Rawalpindi
- 1999/2000: REDCO Pakistan Limited
- 2000/01: Lahore Blues
- 2001/02–2002/03: National Bank of Pakistan
- 2003: Warwickshire
- 2003/04: Allied Bank Limited

Career statistics
Competition	Test	ODI	FC	LA
Matches	87	262	228	411
Runs scored	1,010	969	2,972	1,553
Batting average	10.20	10.30	13.38	10.42
100s/50s	0/0	0/0	0/6	0/0
Top score	45	37	64	45
Balls bowled	16,224	12,698	39,181	19,841
Wickets	373	416	956	675
Bowling average	23.56	23.84	22.33	22.36
5 wickets in innings	22	13	63	17
10 wickets in match	5	0	14	0
Best bowling	7/76	7/36	8/17	7/36
Catches/stumpings	18/–	35/–	58/–	56/–
Medal record
Men's Cricket
Representing Pakistan
ICC Cricket World Cup
Runner-up	1999 England-Wales -Ireland-Scotland-Netherlands
- Source: ESPNCricinfo, 21 April 2012

Waqar Younis Maitla HI (Punjabi, Urdu: وقار یونس میتلا; born 16 November 1971) is a Pakistani cricket coach, commentator and former cricketer who captained Pakistan national cricket team. A right-arm fast bowler, he is widely regarded as one of the greatest bowlers of all time. He is the former head coach of the Pakistani cricket team. He was a part of the squad which finished as runners-up at the 1999 Cricket World Cup.

As of 2021, Younis holds the record for being the youngest Pakistani Test captain and the fourth youngest Test captain in history (22 years 15 days). He played 87 Tests and 262 One Day International (ODI) matches for Pakistan during his international cricket career from 1989 to 2003.

Younis' trademark was his ability to reverse swing a cricket ball at high speed. He took 373 Test wickets and 416 One Day International wickets during his career. Together with bowling partner Wasim Akram, he formed one of the world's most feared bowling attacks. Younis has the second best strike rate, after Dale Steyn, for any bowler with over 350 Test wickets. He is the youngest bowler to take 400 wickets in ODI cricket.

He is also placed in the top ten of all time based on ICC rankings.

He worked as a bowling coach with the national team from 2006 to 2007. Waqar was appointed the coach of the Pakistan cricket team on 3 March 2010. He resigned as Pakistan's cricket coach on 19 August 2011 citing personal reasons. He joined Sunrisers Hyderabad as their bowling coach for the Indian Premier League 2013 season.

On 4 September 2019, Younis was appointed by the PCB as Pakistan's new bowling coach on a 3-year contract. He replaced Azhar Mahmood, who was sacked after Pakistan's disappointing performance in the ICC World Cup 2019 tournament.

== Early and personal life ==
=== Education ===
Younis was born in Burewala, Vehari district, Punjab, Pakistan to a Punjabi Jat family.

He studied in a boarding school in Lahore for some three years before joining the Sadiq Public School, Bahawalpur and later the Government College, Burewala, studying arts and economics.

=== Athleticism during his youth ===
He was raised in Sharjah in the United Arab Emirates, where his father worked. He returned to Pakistan and started playing cricket there during his adolescent years.

During his school and college days he was what he himself calls an all-round athlete, being a runner, a javelin thrower, a high jumper and a pole-vaulter in different competitions, initially being a leg-spinner before choosing pace bowling.

=== Family ===
Since 2000 he is married to Faryal, a Pakistani-Australian doctor, the family residing in Castle Hill, New South Wales, in Australia. They have three children, two daughters and a son.

His younger brother Ali Younis, a former banker turned cricket commentator, is married to cricketer Aliya Riaz. Another younger brother, Captain Faisal Younis, has been a PIA pilot.

=== Cricket commentary ===
Younis has worked as a television sports commentator for the Nine Network in Australia and for Ten Sports in the United Arab Emirates.

== Cricket career ==
=== Early career ===
Younis began his cricket career in 1987/88 in Pakistan, playing for several first-class cricket clubs, and got his break with the Multan under-19 team. However he suffered an injury in which he lost the little finger on his left hand, after he had jumped into a canal. He recovered from this accident and went on to continue his sporting career. He was eventually discovered by former Pakistan captain, Imran Khan and was selected to be part of the national team. He had played only six first-class games when he got picked for the Pakistan camp out of the blue. Waqar says "I remember Imran was not feeling well at the time, and was not present at the camp. Luckily the Super Wills Cup was going on, and there was a match between United Bank and Delhi XI. Saleem Jaffar got injured, and I got the opportunity to play that game. Imran watched me on TV, and actually came to the ground to watch the end of the game. The very next day, he met me and told me that I will be going to Sharjah next month. Just meeting Imran at the time was enough of an experience for me, but for him to notify me of my selection was just out of this world."

=== Domestic ===
English audiences became aware of Waqar's talent during the early 1990s, when he played for Surrey. By taking 113 wickets in 582 overs for Surrey in 1991, at a mere 14.65 apiece (thereby topping the season's first-class bowling averages), and by carrying on his shoulders an otherwise moderate county attack, he announced himself as one of the finest contemporary bowlers. There he displayed excellent cricketing performances and attracted attention from the sporting public. He went on to win the English County Championship with Glamorgan in 1997. He took 7 wickets for 25 against Lancashire at Liverpool on 21 June 1997, which included a hat-trick achieved after narrowly missing a hat-trick and took 68 wickets in the season.

=== International ===
Younis made his International cricket debut for Pakistan against India on 16 November 1989, in the same match that Indian batsman Sachin Tendulkar made his debut. Waqar took 4 wickets in the drawn match including the wickets of Tendulkar and Kapil Dev. He made an immediate impression with his speed and became known in the cricket media as "Wiki" or the "Burewala Express". Waqar along with Wasim Akram opened the bowling attack regularly for Pakistan, becoming a feared and potent attack. At his peak, he developed into a very quick fast bowler and achieved a hat-trick in a One Day International match against New Zealand in 1994. During the early periods of 2000, he stayed out of the Pakistan team for a brief period allegedly due to suspension and conflicts with bowling partner and captain Akram.

His return to cricket came with him being appointed the captain of Pakistan. However, he had to deal with allegations of ball-tampering and a number of controversies. In July 2000 Waqar was banned for one international match for ball tampering and was fined 50% of his match fee. He was the first cricketer to be banned from playing in a match for such incident. He was involved in further controversy during 2003 World Cup matches. In the opening match against Australia, Waqar was removed from the attack after bowling a beamer at Andrew Symonds, becoming the first bowler to be disciplined in such a way during an international match. The Pakistanis then crashed out of the group stage after winning only two matches, both against associate member teams. After the tournament he conceded the captaincy and was dropped from international selection. After a nearly 15-year career, Waqar announced his retirement from cricket altogether in April 2004. At the end of his career he finished as the second highest wicket taker for Pakistani in Test cricket with 373 wickets.

== Coaching career ==
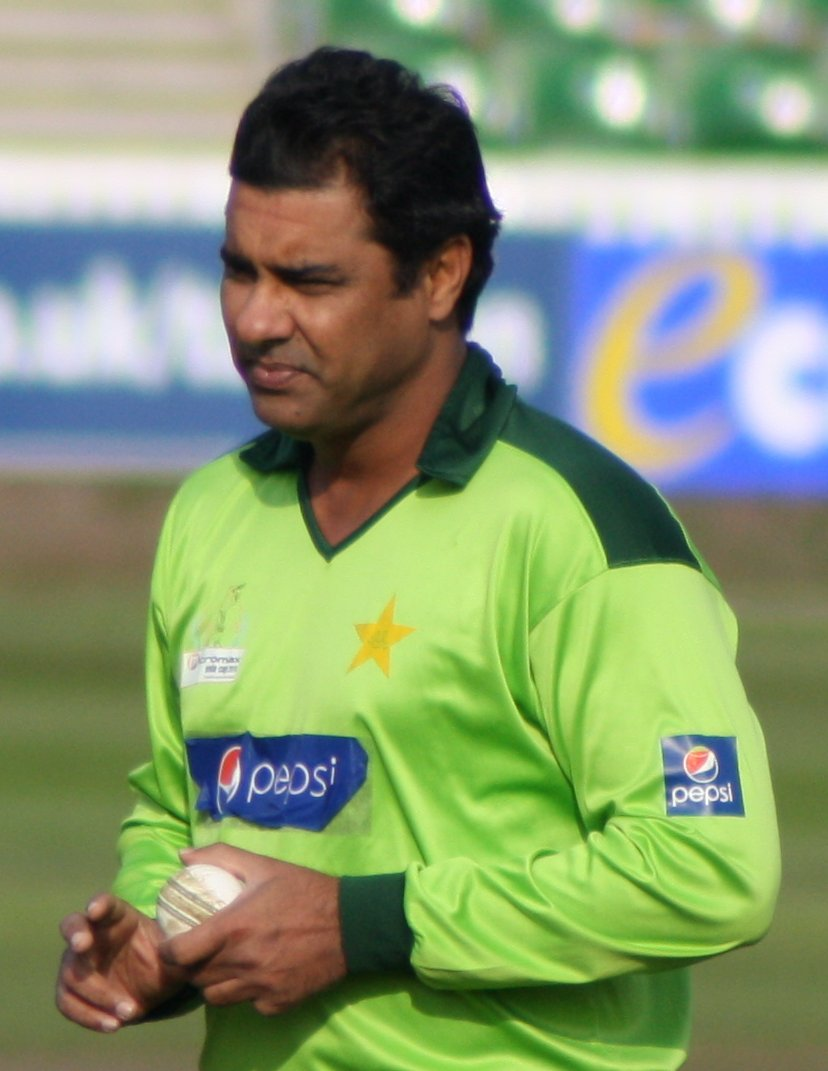
Younis prepares to bowl during a net prior to a 50-over warm-up match against Somerset at the County Ground, Taunton, during Pakistan's 2010 tour of England.

Waqar Younis in an interview, in 2017

In March 2006, he was appointed as the bowling coach for Pakistan. He resigned from this position on 6 January 2007 in protest against the Pakistan Cricket Board decision to retain him only for the Test series against South Africa and not for the subsequent series of five One Day International matches. He also blamed captain Inzamam-ul-Haq for going with Mushtaq Ahmed instead of him for the bowling coach position. He was re-appointed as Pakistan's bowling and fielding coach for their tour of Australia in December 2009. In March 2010, Waqar was appointed the head coach of Pakistan after Intikhab Alam was sacked as coach, owing to the poor performances of the national team during the tour of Australia earlier that year.

Waqar's first job as coach was to lead an inexperienced Pakistan team missing Younis Khan, Mohammad Yousuf and Shoaib Malik to the 2010 ICC World Twenty20 as a consolation, though Waqar had two top-notch bowlers in Mohammad Amir and Mohammad Asif at his disposal. He guided the defending champions to the semi-final of the tournament before they were eliminated by Australia, whose Mike Hussey struck three sixes in the final over.

The World Twenty20 was followed with the 2010 Asia Cup in which Pakistan lost to Sri Lanka by a narrow margin as Pakistan's top order collapsed and Shahid Afridi's 109 just failed to guide Pakistan to victory. In the following match Pakistan lost narrowly against India courtesy of a six by Harbhajan Singh from the third ball of the final over. The following match was a dead rubber between Pakistan and Bangladesh and another Afridi century meant Pakistan scored 385 runs and they comfortably won the match by 139 runs.

A tour of England followed, with two Twenty20's against Australia and two Test matches. Pakistan won both Twenty20's comfortably and the first Test saw Pakistan defeated by 154 runs. Pakistan rallied in the second Test and for the first time in 15 years Pakistan defeated Australia in a Test match. The previous victory in 1995 was also assisted by a superb bowling spell by Waqar Younis.

This tour was followed by a controversial tour of England as Pakistan headed in to the final Test match needing to win it to level the series 2–2. The News of the World broke the news that Mohammad Amir, Mohammad Asif and captain Salman Butt were involved in Spot-fixing. This saw the three players temporarily suspended and Pakistan lost by an innings and 225 runs – their biggest defeat in history. Low team morale meant the next two T20 matches were won comfortably by England, and the subsequent ODI series was won 3–2 by England as well.

This was followed by a tour of Abu Dhabi against South Africa. Pakistan lost the first Twenty20 match by six wickets following a batting collapse. Pakistan also lost the ODI series of five matches 3–2. Pakistan won the second ODI due to Abdul Razzaq's superb performance of 109* off 72 balls. The Test series of two matches with South Africa was drawn. He also stated that now it was the time for Pakistan to rally and prepare for the World Cup. Pakistan started the World Cup campaign in a strong fashion winning 5 out their 6 group matches and finishing on top of their group. Pakistan went on to beat West Indies in the quarter-finals by 10 wickets but lost to India in the semi-finals by 29 runs. Waqar eventually stepped down as Pakistan coach in August 2011 citing personal reasons but a rift with captain Shahid Afridi may have been a contributing factor.

In March 2013, it was announced that he would join Sunrisers Hyderabad as their bowling coach for the Indian Premier League 2013 season.

In May 2014, Waqar was reappointed as the head coach of Pakistan Cricket team for a period of two years, commencing from June 2014, hence serving in that capacity for the second time.

Waqar resigned from the position of Head Coach of Pakistani Cricket team, on April 4, 2016, citing the cricket board's failure to work on his recommendations and leak of a confidential report after the World T20. He will serve as the head coach for Multan Sultans During the Third season of the Pakistan Super League. On 16 November 2017 Waqar appointed as a mentor for Sylhet Sixers a team of Bangladesh Premier League for 2017. As of 15 March 2018 Waqar appointed for their head coach for the next two editions of Bangladesh Premier League

After the Cricket World Cup 2019, Waqar was reappointed as bowling coach of Pakistan Cricket team for a fourth time.

=== 2016 ICC World Twenty20 ===
Waqar Younis faced great criticism after Pakistan was unable to make it to the semi-finals, with less focus on the fact that the country had not seen international cricket for a number of years. After winning against Bangladesh in the Twenty20 2016, the team lost against New Zealand, India and Australia, leading to their ouster. Waqar 'begged' for forgiveness to the nation and said he was ready to retire if it was needed but also said it could have been due to the lack of cricket in their own country.

However, he later wrote in his report that he blamed Pakistan's poor performance in the matches on player Shahid Afridi. Younis submitted the report to the PCB where it was somehow leaked to the media. He expressed his anger and said that the report was confidential – it caused fans, on social media sites, to express disappointment in him to see him shifting the blame onto Afridi. Younis, in the report, accused Afridi of being 'non-serious' during the matches and said Mohammad Hafeez hid his knee injury as well, which also affected their performance. He also said Afridi either performed poorly himself, or that other players did not listen to him as a captain. Regarding the report, he said the PCB (Pakistan Cricket Board) were painting him as the bad guy and skipped meeting with him regarding the issue later on as it was most likely that they leaked the report. He then also scrapped plans of retirement and said he wanted to focus on the leak, despite his contract as coach ending in June 2016.

Younis said he did not want to blame individuals but largely singled out players, particularly Afridi. He said Akmal should not have been selected, instead it should have been players who were 'proud' to represent their country. He also said that the team lost the Asia cup in February 2016 because they were 'unfit' as they had not trained during PSL season and said it was like a 'holiday for them'. Overall, he blamed it on poor captaincy from Afridi. He said it was unfair for him to first use Mohammad Nawaz, a new player, as a bowler in the Asia Cup 2016 because it 'destroyed' his confidence when he was unable to handle it after being hit for 38 runs in 3 overs. Younis later posted on his Twitter – 'no one wants to hear the truth'.

On 4 April 2016, Waqar resigned as Head Coach of the team, just after Shahid Afridi resigned as T20 captain. His reason behind it was the PCB who he said had used him as the "scapegoat" and shown him as a "villain" by leaking the Twenty20 report. He stepped down as coach 3 months before his contract would end and said that his scrapped salary should definitely be invested in domestic cricket. He added that he had tried his best to revive the team but they were still unable to better their performance and his recommendations in the report were badly handled by the PCB, who refused to even talk about the leak. Waqar Younis said his services to Pakistan cricket should not be forgotten and said he was stepping down with a heavy heart.

== Playing style ==
During his peak and before his injury, from 1990 and 1993, Waqar was considered the fastest bowler in the world, getting 170 wickets from his first 29 Tests during that period. His fastest recorded delivery was measured at 153 km/h (≈ 95.1 mph) in 1993, making him the fastest recorded pace bowler from Pakistan after Shoaib Akhtar.

=== Reverse swing ===
Waqar is one of several Pakistani fast bowlers, beginning with Sarfraz Nawaz, who have been successful at bowling reverse swing, because he was used as an old-ball bowler early in his career until Imran Khan retired. In partnership with Akram, Younis opened the Pakistan bowling attack in the 1990s. Cricket critics and scholars attribute Younis and Akram to be one of the most effective fast bowling partnerships in cricket history, due to their ability to swing the ball at high speed. The ability to reverse swing and his speed led to him becoming one of the most talented bowlers in modern cricket.

Waqar explained his ability to reverse swing by the manipulation of an old ball; with one side shiny, one side rough, the ball would move in the opposite direction to conventional swing. This led to Waqar having the ability to bowl inswingers and outswingers in the cricket pitch and in effect both Waqar and Akram became successful in taking wickets with this variation of swing bowling. His fastest timed delivery in cricket was 153 km/h or 95.1 mph, a delivery he bowled against South Africa in 1993 but this was after he had suffered serious back injuries which had really reduced his bowling speeds. He was also effective in the use of bouncers or short-pitched deliveries; Waqar's bowling against South Africa in Sheikhupura in Pakistan, is remembered for his effective use of the short-pitched delivery.

Following Pakistan's victory during the Test match series versus England in 1992, the English media were suspicious of the reverse swing delivery. It was relatively unknown to the cricketing world during that period and this led to accusations of foul play by critics, however cricket officials found no evidence of foul play and the skill of the reverse swing delivery has been accepted in cricket.

=== Influence ===
Sri Lanka fast bowler, Lasith Malinga, who became the first bowler in World Cup history to take two hat-tricks, has said that he learnt to bowl his deadly yorkers by watching Pakistan's legendary pair of Wasim Akram and Waqar Younis. No doubt over the years several bowlers have learned and mastered the skill of reverse swing but there are still some techniques which haven't have been explored, e.g. banana swing. The title of Banana Swing Bowler was given to Waqar Younis because of his unique technique of swinging the ball in the air at very high speed before hitting the ground. In most of his hat tricks he delivered banana swing balls which were unplayable.

=== Criticism ===
Despite his qualities as a fast bowler, he was expensive at times and sometimes lacked the consistency of bowlers such as West Indian fast bowler Curtly Ambrose and Australian fast bowler Glenn McGrath. This may be partly due to the mentality of his former captain, Imran Khan, who prioritised aggression and speed.

== Legacy ==
=== Usain Bolt ===
The world's fastest sprinter and runner Usain Bolt, who is from Jamaica (in the West Indies), once replied while being asked about who were his heroes when he was a child: "When I was really small I loved the Pakistan cricket team. Waqar Younis was one of the greatest bowlers ever, and I was a bowler so I really enjoyed watching him. I was a big Pakistan fan until I got older, when I noticed that I should actually support my home team." When asked what if there was a match between Pakistan and Windies, Bolt remarked "I would still have supported Pakistan, that's what I'm saying – when I was little, it was all about Pakistan."

=== ICC Hall of Fame ===
Younis was inducted in the ICC Hall of Fame of 9 December 2013. He became the 70th male inductee into the Hall of Fame, joining compatriot Hanif Mohammad and Zaheer Abbas as well as his former teammates Imran Khan, Javed Miandad and Wasim Akram. On his induction he said: "It's a huge honour for me, I'm truly grateful to the people who've considered me worthy of such an honour."

== Award and records ==
- Waqar is the second best strike rate holder in Test Match Cricket with a minimum of 10,000 balls being bowled He has a strike rate of 43.4 even after bowling 16224 deliveries, which made him second only to Dale Steyn who has a strike rate of 42.0 after bowling 17707 deliveries in test match cricket.
- Waqar was named among the Wisden Cricketers of the Year in 1992 for his sporting achievements. He is also the only bowler to have taken 5 wickets in an innings in 3 consecutive One Day International matches. In terms of deliveries bowled, he has taken the fastest 300, 350 and 400 wickets in One Day International matches.
- Although primarily a fast bowler, Waqar scored 1010 Test match runs during his career. As of September 2005, he was the only non-batsman to achieve a thousand runs without scoring a fifty. Waqar holds the record for the best strike rate for any bowler with over 350 Test wickets.
- Waqar Younis holds the record for the best bowling figures as a captain in an ODI(7/36) and was also the first captain to take a 7 wicket haul in an ODI innings.
- He also holds the record for scoring the most career ODI runs when batting at number 10 (478)
- He is the youngest ever bowler to take a five wicket haul in an ODI innings (at the age of 18 years and 164 days)
- He holds the record for taking the most 4 wicket hauls in ODI cricket(27)
- He holds the record for taking the most consecutive five wicket hauls in terms of innings(3) and he's also the only player to achieve this milestone for 3 successive times
- He is the only bowler to take 3 successive 4fers in an ODI innings thrice in his career

=== Five wickets in an innings ===
Waqar Younis has taken five or more wickets in an innings on 22 occasions in Test cricket. In One Day International matches, he has taken the most five-wicket hauls (on 13 occasions).

== Controversies ==
=== Religious rhetoric ===
After Pakistan beat India for the first time in an ICC tournament (the 2021 T20 WC), Waqar said that "watching Rizwan do namaz in front of Hindus was very special." This created an uproar in both Pakistan and India and he later apologized for the comment.

Sporting positions
Preceded by Moin Khan	Pakistani national cricket captain 2001–2003	Succeeded by Rashid Latif
Preceded by Intikhab Alam	Pakistani national cricket coach 2010–2011	Succeeded by Dav Whatmore
