= Yorker =

Type of ball bowled in cricket

Different deliveries. Yorker in green.

In cricket, a yorker is a ball bowled (a delivery) which bounces by the batter's feet. This length makes it very challenging for a batter to play the ball.

When a batter assumes a normal stance, a yorker generally bounces on the cricket pitch on or near the batter's popping crease. A batter who advances down the pitch to strike the ball (typically to spin bowlers) may by so advancing cause the ball to pitch (or land) at or around their feet and may thus cause themself to be "yorked". A yorker is considered one of the most difficult deliveries to bowl in cricket.

== Etymology ==
The Oxford English Dictionary gives the derivation of the term as originating in Yorkshire, a notable English cricketing county.

According to Oxford dictionaries, the term was coined because players from York bowled these deliveries. Another theory attributes the name to the other meaning of yorker which is a cheater. However, other derivations have been suggested. The term may derive from the 18th and 19th century slang term "to pull Yorkshire" on a person, meaning to trick or deceive them, although there is evidence to suggest that the Middle English word yuerke (meaning to trick or deceive) may have been the source.

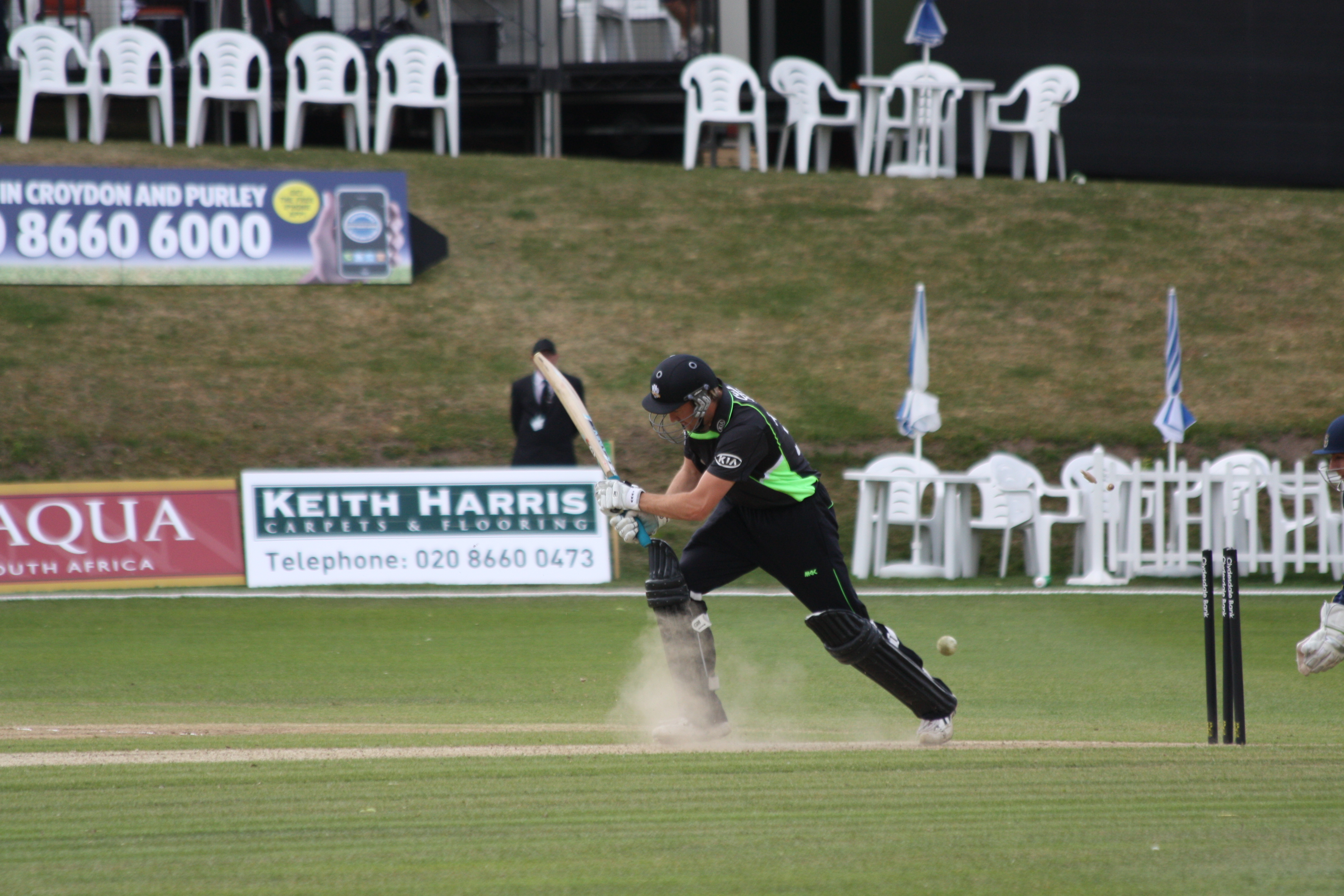
Chris Schofield being bowled by a yorker

== Play ==
A batter who has been beaten by a yorker is said to have been yorked. "Beaten" in this context does not mean that the batter is bowled or given out lbw but can include the batter missing the ball with the bat. A delivery which is intended to be a yorker but which does not york the batter is known as an attempted yorker.

A batter in their normal stance will raise his bat (backlift) as the bowler bowls which can make the yorker difficult to play when it arrives at the batter's feet. A batter may only realise very late that the delivery is of yorker length and will jam their bat down to "dig out" the yorker.

== Use ==
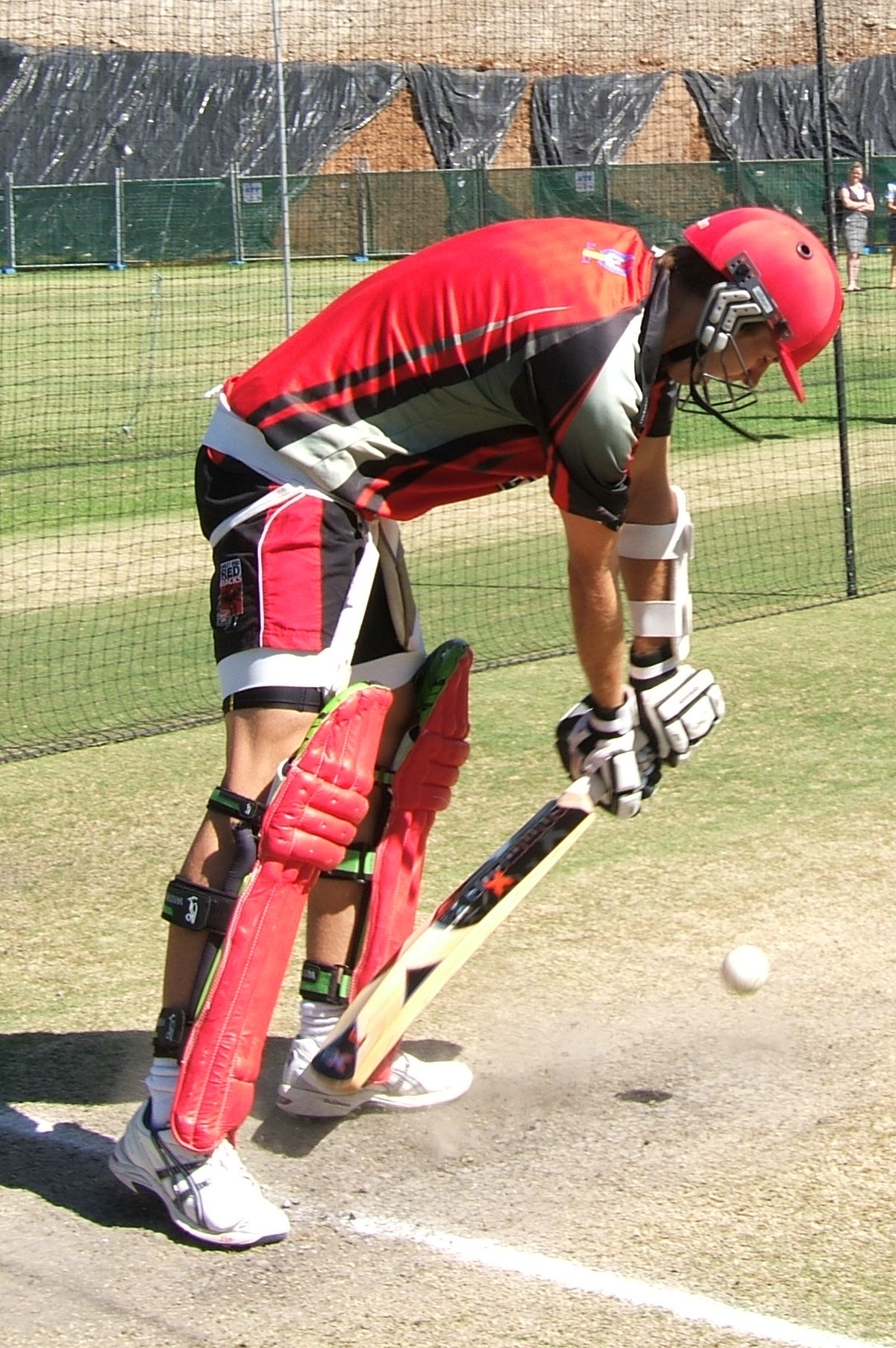
Yorkers are very difficult to play. Here a batter defends against one in the nets.

A yorker is a difficult delivery to bowl as a mistimed delivery can either result in a full toss or half-volley which can easily be played by the batter. Bowling yorkers is a tactic used most often by fast bowlers. A fast yorker is one of the most difficult types of delivery in cricket to play successfully, as the bat must be swung down right to the pitch to intercept the ball—if any gap remains between the bat and the pitch, the ball can squeeze through and potentially go on to hit the wicket. The yorker might miss the bat but hit the pads in front of the wicket, resulting in the batter getting out lbw. When the batter blocks such a ball, it is referred to as "dug out". A bowler who achieves swing when bowling yorkers can be even more dangerous, as the ball will deviate sideways as it travels towards the batter, making it even harder to hit.

Yorkers can also be aimed directly at the batter's feet, forcing the batter to shift his feet while attempting to play the ball, or risk being hit. Inswinging yorkers have a reputation for being particularly hard to defend and difficult to score runs off. Such a delivery is colloquially known as a sandshoe crusher, toe crusher, cobbler's delight or nail breaker. A recent variation is the wide yorker, which is delivered wide of the batter on the off side. This is particularly useful in Twenty20 cricket as a ploy to restrict runs rather than to get the batter out.

Despite the effectiveness of yorkers, they are notoriously difficult to bowl correctly and usually will be attempted only a handful of times during a sequence of several overs. Yorkers are best used to surprise a batter who has become accustomed to hitting shorter-pitched balls and not with the bat speed necessary to defend against a yorker. As such, a yorker is frequently bowled quickly to give the batter less time to react and position his bat.

The yorker is regarded as particularly effective against weak tail-end batters, who often lack the skill to defend even a non-swinging yorker and who are sometimes less susceptible to other bowling tactics. It is also particularly effective in the later stages of an innings in one-day cricket, because it is the most difficult of all deliveries to score off even if defended successfully. Runs will often only be scored off edges or straight down the ground.

The most notable bowlers in delivering yorkers are Pakistanis Waqar Younis, Wasim Akram, and Shoaib Akhtar, Sri Lankan Lasith Malinga, Australians Brett Lee, Mitchell Starc, Pat Cummins and Mitchell Johnson, New Zealanders Trent Boult, Shane Bond and Tim Southee, South Africans Dale Steyn and Allan Donald, West Indians Patrick Patterson, Malcolm Marshall, Courtney Walsh, Curtly Ambrose and Jerome Taylor, Indians Zaheer Khan, Bhuvneshwar Kumar, Jasprit Bumrah, T. Natarajan and Englishmen Andrew Flintoff, Chris Jordan and Mark Wood.

== Bowling a yorker ==
A yorker is usually delivered very late in the bowling action with the hand pointing almost vertically. The aim is both to get more pace and to deliver it later so as to deceive the batter in flight. It is usually recommended to deliver the ball with some inswing but an away-swinging yorker aimed at the pads can be just as effective. Because yorkers are quite difficult to bowl they require substantial practice in order to achieve consistent success.
