= Glen Bruk-Jackson =

Zimbabwean cricketer (born 1969)

Personal information
- Full name: Glen Keith Bruk-Jackson
- Born: 25 April 1969 (age 57); Salisbury, Rhodesia
- Batting: Right-handed
- Bowling: Right-arm off break
- Role: Batsman

International information
- National side: Zimbabwe
- Test debut: 1 December 1993 v Pakistan
- Last Test: 9 December 1993 v Pakistan
- Only ODI: 27 December 1993 v Pakistan

Career statistics
Competition	Test	ODI	FC	LA
Matches	2	1	32	13
Runs scored	39	12	1,413	172
Batting average	9.75	12.00	28.26	17.20
100s/50s	0/0	0/0	2/6	0/0
Top score	31	12	130	44
Balls bowled	–	–	8	–
Wickets	–	–	0	–
Bowling average	–	–	–	–
5 wickets in innings	–	–	–	–
10 wickets in match	–	–	–	–
Best bowling	–	–	–	–
Catches/stumpings	0/–	0/–	11/–	5/–
- Source: ESPNcricinfo, 11 June 2015

Glen Keith Bruk-Jackson (born 25 April 1969) is a former Zimbabwean cricketer.

A right-handed batsman, Bruk-Jackson played in two Test matches and one One Day International for Zimbabwe, all during their tour of Pakistan in December 1993. He played domestically for Mashonaland Country Districts and later Mashonaland.
