= David White (New Zealand cricketer) =

New Zealand cricketer (born 1961)

Personal information
- Full name: David John White
- Born: 26 June 1961; Gisborne, New Zealand
- Batting: Right-handed
- Bowling: Right-arm off break

International information
- National side: New Zealand (1990)
- Test debut (cap 174): 10 October 1990 v Pakistan
- Last Test: 18 October 1990 v Pakistan
- ODI debut (cap 70): 2 November 1990 v Pakistan
- Last ODI: 7 November 1990 v Pakistan

Career statistics
Competition	Test	ODI	FC	LA
Matches	2	3	106	44
Runs scored	31	37	4,926	792
Batting average	7.75	12.33	28.97	19.31
100s/50s	0/0	0/0	7/28	1/0
Top score	18	15	209	101
Balls bowled	3	–	2,436	–
Wickets	–	–	3	–
Bowling average	–	–	41.48	–
5 wickets in innings	–	–	1	–
10 wickets in match	–	–	0	–
Best bowling	–	–	6/45	–
Catches/stumpings	0/–	1/–	45/–	14/–
- Source: ESPNcricinfo, 4 May 2017

David John White (born 26 June 1961) is a former New Zealand cricketer who played in two Test matches and three One Day Internationals in 1990.

Domestically, White played 99 first-class matches for Northern Districts. White also played for Poverty Bay and the Bay of Plenty in the Hawke Cup.

A former rugby administrator, White also was chief executive of New Zealand Cricket.
