= Off cutter =

Bowling style in Cricket

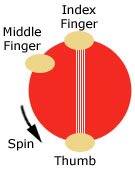
Off-cutter grip for a right handed bowler (batsman's view).

An off cutter is a type of delivery in the game of cricket. It is bowled by fast bowlers.

A bowler releases a normal fast delivery with the wrist locked in position and the first two fingers positioned on top of the cricket ball, giving it spin about a horizontal axis perpendicular to the length of the pitch. For an off cutter, a right-handed bowler pulls his fingers down the right side of the ball (from his viewpoint), in an action similar to bowling an off break, only at higher speed. This changes the axis of spin to make it more like an off break, which makes the ball deviate to the right when it bounces on the pitch. From a right-handed batsman's point of view, this deviation is to the left, or from the off side towards the leg side. This deviation is known as cut, and the delivery is called an off cutter because it moves away from the off side. What differentiates a genuine off cutter from a delivery that simply nips back off the seam is that it is deliberately bowled. A fast off cutter can also be bowled by placing the index and middle fingers on one side of the vertical seam, with the remaining fingers spread and tensed on the opposite side of the ball, as used by Brian Statham and Ray Lindwall.

Off cutters do not turn as sharply as off breaks bowled by an off spin bowler, but at the speed of a fast bowler even a tiny deviation can cause difficulties for the batsman. If he is not quick enough to react to the movement, the batsman can miss the ball with his bat and be bowled between bat and pad or out leg before wicket if struck on the pads.

A fast bowler will typically use the off cutter as a variation ball, as it is most effective when it surprises the batsman. Waqar Younis, Mustafizur Rahman, Glenn McGrath, Richard Hadlee, and Fred Trueman managed a bagful of wickets with this delivery because of the accurate lengths at which they operated, between fuller and good lengths (ball landing 2 to 3 steps in front of the batsman) at close to the off stump line. The surprise comes because, when facing rigorously accurate off-side bowlers, like those mentioned above, batters usually incorporate plans to leave the ball, or exaggerate foot movements to the pitch of the ball in anticipation.

The calling card of this delivery, for the batsman to read it in advance, is the typical wobble in the seam after ball release with the seam slanting predominantly towards the batsman. A simple way for a beginner to learn to bowl cutters is to try imparting strong back-spin to the ball by pulling down on the seam at the time of release while keeping the seam vertical.

Cutters work especially well on pitches that are rough, or when the ball lands on cracks on the surface. Such surfaces grip the seam and stop the reverse rotation, leading to considerable deviation as well as causing the ball to keep low after pitching. In the latter case, the balls are also called 'shooters'. Lance Klusener used this tactic in matches in the West Indies and the Indian subcontinent, particularly in one match in Calcutta towards the end of his career when he had lost some of his speed.

In test matches, bowlers tend to 'work the cracks' using cutters, meaning that they try pitching the ball on cracks repeatedly with the result that few of the balls that do pitch on cracks unsettles even a well-set batsman.

In contemporary cricket, the off-cutter is primarily used as a slower ball in limited over cricket.

== See also ==
- Leg cutter
