= Dale Steyn =

South African cricketer (born 1983)

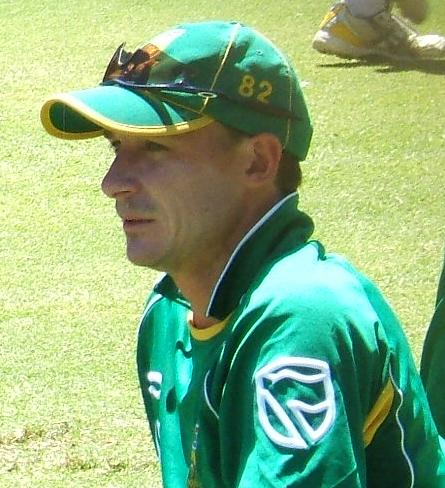
- Steyn in 2009

Personal information
- Full name: Dale Willem Steyn
- Born: 27 June 1983 (age 43); Phalaborwa, Transvaal Province, South Africa
- Height: 5 ft 10 in (178 cm)
- Batting: Right-handed
- Bowling: Right-arm fast
- Role: Bowler

International information
- National side: South Africa (2004–2020)
- Test debut (cap 297): 17 December 2004 v England
- Last Test: 21 February 2019 v Sri Lanka
- ODI debut (cap 82): 17 August 2005 v Asia XI
- Last ODI: 13 March 2019 v Sri Lanka
- ODI shirt no.: 8
- T20I debut (cap 31): 23 November 2007 v New Zealand
- Last T20I: 21 February 2020 v Australia
- T20I shirt no.: 8

Domestic team information
- Years: Team
- 2003/04–2005/06: Northerns
- 2004/05–2009/10; 2017/18–2018/19: Titans
- 2005: Essex
- 2007: Warwickshire
- 2008–2010; 2019–2020: Royal Challengers Bangalore
- 2010/11–2016/17: Cape Cobras
- 2011–2012: Deccan Chargers
- 2013–2015: Sunrisers Hyderabad
- 2016: Gujarat Lions
- 2016: Glamorgan
- 2016: Jamaica Tallawahs
- 2018: Hampshire
- 2018–2019: Cape Town Blitz
- 2019/20: Melbourne Stars
- 2020: Islamabad United
- 2020: Kandy Tuskers
- 2021: Quetta Gladiators

Career statistics
Competition	Test	ODI	T20I	FC
Matches	93	125	47	141
Runs scored	1,251	365	21	1,824
Batting average	13.59	9.35	3.50	13.71
100s/50s	0/2	0/1	0/0	0/4
Top score	76	60	5	82
Balls bowled	18,608	6,256	1,015	27,183
Wickets	439	196	64	618
Bowling average	22.95	25.95	18.35	23.57
5 wickets in innings	26	3	0	35
10 wickets in match	5	0	0	7
Best bowling	7/51	6/39	4/9	8/41
Catches/stumpings	26/–	28/–	12/–	33/–
- Source: ESPNcricinfo, 21 February 2020

Dale Willem Steyn (/ˈsteɪn/; born 27 June 1983) is a South African former professional cricketer who played for the South African cricket team. Regarded as one of the greatest fast bowlers of all time, Steyn's ability to produce late swing at high pace - a rare and lethal combination amongst fast bowlers - made him stand apart from many of his contemporaries. Many cricketing legends have regarded his length deliveries unplayable when the ball swung. During the 2007–08 season, Steyn achieved a tally of 78 wickets at an average of 16.24, and was subsequently rewarded with the ICC 2008 Test Cricketer of the Year Award. He was named one of the Wisden Cricketers of the Year in 2013, and the Wisden Leading Cricketer in the World for the year 2013 in 2014's Wisden Cricketers' Almanack. In December 2015, Steyn suffered a shoulder injury during the Durban Test against England, beginning a series of injuries that curtailed the latter part of his career.

He was featured in Wisden Cricketers of the Decade at the end of 2019. He also was included in the ICC Test Team of the Decade at the end of 2020.

Steyn dominated the number one spot in the ICC Test rankings at the peak of his career, for a record 263 weeks between 2008 and 2014. Sri Lankan Muttiah Muralitharan sits next on the list with 214 weeks. In terms of days, Steyn had spent 2,356 days at the top as of 6 October 2016. In October 2012, former South African test cricketer Allan Donald called the South African pace attack, which Steyn was part of, alongside Vernon Philander and Morne Morkel, the best South Africa had ever produced. In December 2018, during the first Test against Pakistan, Steyn became the leading wicket taker for South Africa in Test cricket, a distinction previously held by all-rounder and former-captain Shaun Pollock.

On 5 August 2019, Steyn announced his retirement from Test cricket, to focus on limited-overs cricket. Steyn announced his retirement from all forms of cricket on 31 August 2021.

== Early life and domestic career ==
Steyn was born in 1983 in the small town of Phalaborwa, on the border of the Kruger National Park in South Africa. His family is from Zimbabwe.

Steyn made his first-class debut for Northerns (subsequently merged with Easterns to form the Titans) on 17 October 2003. He only played two first-class games and made little impact in his first season, but a series of strong performances in the initial part of the 2004/05 season saw him called up to the Test squad to play England. He went back to playing for the Titans after failing to impress in his first three Tests. However his late outswinging delivery to castle Michael Vaughan in the 4th innings of his first test at Gqeberha, Port Elizabeth is considered as one of the balls of the century.

Steyn went to England in 2005 to play for Essex, appearing in seven matches between May and June. He failed to make a big impact in his initial outing in County Championship cricket, taking 14 wickets at 59.85. Following his work at Essex with world expert bowling coach Ian Pont Steyn returned to domestic cricket in South Africa, where he bowled excellently for the Titans through the 2005/2006 season which earned him a recall to the Test squad to face New Zealand.

As a result of becoming a regular selection for the national team, Steyn subsequently played little domestic cricket in South Africa from then onwards, appearing for the Titans in just five SuperSport Series matches after the end of the 2005/06 season.

He had a second stint in England, playing for Warwickshire in the first half of the 2007 English season. This time around he had more success, claiming 23 County Championship wickets in seven matches at an average of 25.86. He also played well in the Friends Provident Trophy, a 50-over tournament, finishing as the leading wicket-taker for Warwickshire. He has since become a regular in the South African One Day International team.

=== Franchise cricket ===
Steyn signed to play in the Indian Premier League in 2008, playing for the Royal Challengers Bangalore. He earned US$325,000 for his appearance in the tournament. He spent his first three seasons in the Indian Premier League with Royal Challengers Bangalore. For IPL 2011 he was bought by Deccan Chargers for $1.2 million. After Deccan Chargers were terminated from the IPL he was drafted to Sunrisers Hyderabad where he played three seasons.

In the 2016 IPL auction, he was bought by Gujarat Lions for ₹ 22.3 million. He could not participate in the 2017 IPL season after being released by Gujarat Lions prior to the season. He went unsold at the 2018 and 2019 IPL auctions. In mid-April 2019, Steyn joined Royal Challengers Bangalore for the 2019 IPL season as a replacement for the injured Nathan Coulter-Nile.

In the 2020 IPL auction, he was bought by the Royal Challengers Bangalore ahead of the 2020 Indian Premier League. He played three matches in the tournament, picking one wicket at an average of 133 and economy rate of 11.40. He was released from the team after the season.

In September 2019, he was named in the squad for the Cape Town Blitz team for the 2019 Mzansi Super League tournament. In October 2019, Steyn signed to play in the Big Bash for the Melbourne Stars. In December 2019, he was drafted by Pakistan Super League franchise Islamabad United as their first pick of the draft in the Platinum Category.

In November 2020, Steyn joined Kandy Tuskers for the 2020 Lanka Premier League. In the 2021 PSL Draft, he was picked by Quetta Gladiators in the Supplementary category.

== International career ==
=== 2004–2007: Early days ===
Steyn made his debut for South Africa on 17 December 2004 in the first Test of England's tour. His first victim in Test cricket was Marcus Trescothick whom he bowled with a fast in-swinging delivery. However, his overall performance was underwhelming, he took eight wickets at an average of 52.00 and he was dropped after bowling poorly in England's second innings of the fourth Test in January 2005, bowling eight no-balls in nine overs which went for 47 runs. England won the match by 77 runs.

Later that year, Steyn was picked in the squad for the African XI in the Afro-Asia Cup of 2005/06, and he made his One Day International debut on 17 August 2005. The African XI won the match, with Steyn bowling last batsman Ashish Nehra to seal victory by two runs. Steyn made his One Day International debut for South Africa on 20 January 2006 in a match against Australia at Melbourne, a match which was part of the 2005–06 VB Series. Steyn did not bowl particularly well and after another below par performance against Sri Lanka he dropped out of consideration for the South African ODI team.

Following a strong season playing domestic cricket for the Titans, Steyn was recalled to the Test team to play New Zealand in April 2006. He responded to his opportunity with his first five-wicket haul in the first Test at Centurion, ripping through the New Zealand batting lineup along with Makhaya Ntini as New Zealand crumbled to 120 all out, chasing 248 to win. He finished the three Test series with 16 wickets at 26.00 and made a fine impression throughout.

Steyn was included in the Test team to play Sri Lanka away in a two match series in July and August 2006. In his first overseas Test, at the Sinhalese Sports Club Ground, Colombo, he took 3 for 129 as Sri Lanka piled up 756–5, with Kumar Sangakkara and Mahela Jayawardene putting together the highest Test match partnership ever (624 runs). South Africa slumped to defeat by an innings and 153 runs. In the second Test, at the Paikiasothy Saravanamuttu Stadium, Colombo, Steyn took his second five-wicket haul in Tests during Sri Lanka's first innings, but went wicketless in their seconds innings as Sri Lanka sealed a 2–0 series victory by a single wicket. Steyn finished the series with eight wickets at an average of 36.50.

=== 2007–2011: Successful years ===
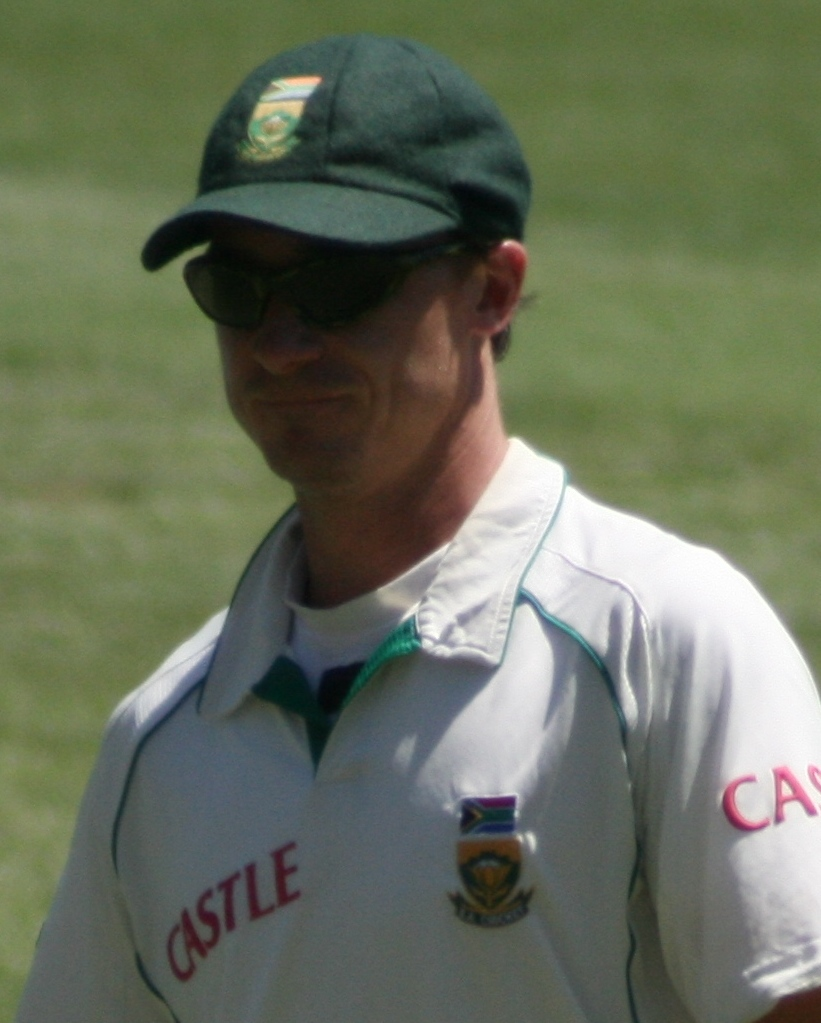
Dale Steyn in the field at the SCG in January 2009

Steyn kept his Test place for the three match home series against India. He picked up an injury whilst bowling early in India's first innings in the first Test at Johannesburg which prevented him from taking much further part in the game and also ruled him out of the second Test. He returned to play in the deciding third Test at Cape Town and bowled well, taking six wickets for 88 runs in the match as South Africa clinched the match and the series. He finished the series with six wickets at an average of 19.00.

Despite his strong performance on his return to the team in the third Test against India, Steyn missed out on a place in the first two Tests against Pakistan, with the selectors opting to play a four-man attack featuring full-time spinner Paul Harris. He returned in the third Test, at Cape Town, when the selectors decided to rest André Nel and Shaun Pollock in preparation for the imminent 2007 Cricket World Cup. He took four wickets in the match for 87 runs as South Africa won the match by 5 wickets and took the series 2–1. As this was his only match, his average for the series was 21.75.

Steyn was recalled to the South African ODI squad in June 2007 and played in three matches between June and August, against Ireland, India and Zimbabwe. He had mixed success in these three matches, taking wickets but proving expensive.

Steyn was picked for the Test squad to tour Pakistan in October, and played in both Tests. In the first Test at Karachi, during Pakistan's second innings, he picked up his third Test five-wicket haul as Pakistan were bowled out for 263 chasing 424 to win. He had an unremarkable second Test, with the match petering out to a draw, handing South Africa the series 1–0, and finished the series with nine wickets at 24.66.

Steyn was by now an established member of the Test team, and he produced his finest series performance to date in the two Test matches against New Zealand in November. In the first Test at Johannesburg he collected his fourth and fifth five-wicket hauls (5/35 and 5/59) and his first ten-wicket match as New Zealand were thrashed by 358 runs, South Africa's biggest victory margin in terms of runs to date. Steyn was also awarded his first Test Man-of-the-Match award. This devastating form continued into the second Test at Centurion where he picked up 4/42 in the first innings and his sixth five-wicket haul (6/49) to help South Africa to victory by an innings and 59 runs. His second ten-wicket match earned him his second Man-of-the-Match award in a row and his series performance of 20 wickets at an average of 9.20 won him his first Man-of-the-Series award. On the back of his performance, he broke into the top five of the ICC rankings for Test bowlers for the first time in his career.

He made his Twenty20 International debut on 23 November 2007 in the one-off game against New Zealand, taking the wicket of Scott Styris and only giving up 17 runs from his four overs. He also featured in the third One Day International at Cape Town, where he had partial success, taking the wickets of the New Zealand openers, Brendon McCullum and Lou Vincent, but going for 50 runs from nine overs.

Steyn's next international appearance was in the first Twenty20 International against the West Indies. He took the exceptional figures of 4/9 in three overs, with all four wickets being picture perfect yorkers, but was unable to stop the West Indies chasing down the target of 59 runs in a match reduced to 13 overs by rain.

Steyn's form continued into the Test series. He had a fairly indifferent match in the first Test at Port Elizabeth, taking 5/188 in the match as the West Indies scored their first away victory in Test matches for two and a half years, although he did hit his highest Test match score to date, 33 not out, in South Africa's second innings. He picked up figures of 4/60 and 4/44 in the second Test at Cape Town as South Africa leveled the series and once again proved his worth in the deciding third Test at Durban by taking 1/18 and 6/72, his seventh five-wicket haul, as the West Indies were thrashed by an innings and 100 runs. His 20 wickets at 19.10. earned him his second consecutive Man-of-the-Series award.

He played in the first three matches of the One Day International series, but could not match his Test success and was briefly dropped after failing to take a wicket and going for 62 runs in his ten overs during the third match at Port Elizabeth He was recalled for the fifth match at Johannesburg but struggled again, taking one wicket but going for 78 runs from ten overs.

In the first Test of the two match series against Bangladesh, at Dhaka, Steyn helped South Africa avoid an embarrassing defeat. Bangladesh were bowled out for 192 in their first innings, with Steyn claiming 3/27, but then South Africa collapsed to 170 all out, handing the hosts a shock 22 run lead. However Steyn(4/48) then combined with Jacques Kallis (5/30) to restrict Bangladesh to 182 all out and South Africa were able to complete a five wicket victory on the fourth day of the match. South Africa won the second Test at Chittagong comprehensively (by an innings and 205 runs) and Steyn returned figures of 4/66 and 3/35 giving him 14 wickets in the series at an average of 12.57 which won him his third consecutive Man-of-the-Series award. When Steyn dismissed Junaid Siddique in Bangladesh's first innings (his 20th match), he claimed the record for the fastest South African to reach 100 wickets in Tests, beating Hugh Tayfield's record of 21 matches. He holds the record amongst all players who are currently playing Test cricket.

Steyn featured in the final One Day International of the three match series, going wicketless but only giving away 19 runs in 8 overs.

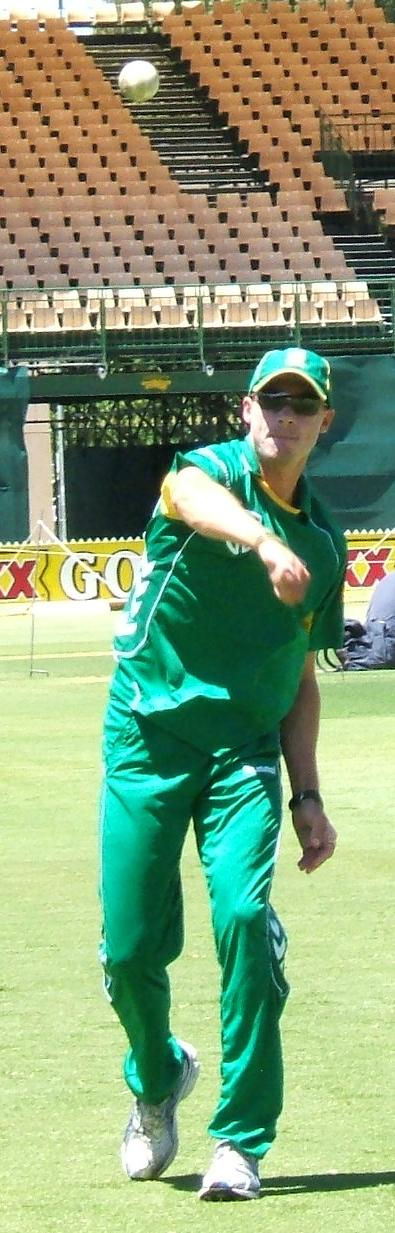
Steyn fields a ball at practice, Adelaide Oval, January 2009

Coming into the three Test series against India predictions about how Steyn would fare were mixed, with some commentators identifying him a crucial part of a South African team which could pose a serious challenge to India, whilst others predicted he might struggle playing against a strong batting lineup on lifeless subcontinent pitches.

The first Test at Chennai turned out to be a very high scoring affair, with South Africa batting first and making 540, then India responding strongly, led by Virender Sehwag who scored 319 from 304 balls, to reach 468/1 by the end of the third day. On the fourth day Steyn helped to restrict India's lead to 87 runs by dismissing MS Dhoni with a bouncer then blasting through the lower order, taking three wickets in two overs for the cost of two runs, all bowled with reverse swinging deliveries. He finished the innings, and the match which petered out into a tame draw, with four wickets for 103 runs. On the morning of the second Test at Ahmedabad, South Africa demolished the much vaunted Indian batting line within twenty overs, for the meagre total of 76 runs. Steyn was the pick of the bowlers taking five wickets for 23 runs, dismissing Sehwag and Rahul Dravid then mopping up the last three batsmen for the cost of 11 runs. In the second innings he added a further three wickets to his match tally, finishing the game with eight wickets for 114 runs, as South Africa completed a crushing victory by an innings and 90 runs. The final Test at Kanpur saw Steyn pick up three first innings wickets which took him to 15 wickets in the series at an average of 20.20. As a result of this, the cumulation of an outstanding 2007/08 season in which he took 75 wickets in 11 matches, Steyn moved up to joint first place (alongside Muttiah Muralitharan) in the ICC Test match bowling rankings.

In the 2nd Test match in a 3 match series, Steyn was involved in a record 9th wicket partnership of 180 with J.P. Duminy. Steyn recorded a score of 76 (191 deliveries) in an innings that helped South Africa recover from 6–141 to post a score of 459. Steyn also starred in the first innings with figures of 5–87 (29.0 overs). In the second innings Steyn returned figures of 5–67 (20.2 overs) and helped South Africa to restrict the Australians to 247 giving the hosts a lead of 183. Steyn now had match figures of 10–154. This was the third time that he had taken 10 wickets in a match in his Test career. South Africa duly completed the chase with nine wickets in hand, giving them a 2–0 series lead and their first ever Test series win in Australia. It was also Australia's first home series defeat in 16 years. Steyn was named man of the match for this performance. Steyn made a rearguard effort in attempting to prevent an Australian victory in the 3rd Test in Sydney frustrating the hosts with 28 runs in 65 balls in a 50 run partnership from 105 balls with Makhaya Ntini in order to try to secure the draw. However, when he was out with 50 balls to go, injured captain Graeme Smith came in with a broken hand in an attempt to hold out. Smith was eventually bowled out by Mitchell Johnson with ten balls to go.

Steyn got career best ODI figures of 5 wickets for 50 runs against India in Nagpur during the 2011 ICC Cricket World Cup. India had a good start to their batting innings but could not maintain their momentum, in the process losing their final 9 wickets for just 29 runs. Steyn played a vital role in the derailment of a strong Indian batting line-up. He was named in the 'Team of the Tournament' for the 2011 World Cup by the ICC and ESPNcricinfo.

=== 2012–2014: Rise to fame ===
....It is human nature to underrate the present and grossly overrate the past, but if you outlaw that trait, time has come to place Steyn among the greatest fast bowlers of the game.....

— 2013 article Hail Dale by Harsha Bhogle

On 2 January 2013, Steyn bowled Doug Bracewell out in first session of the first test of the New Zealand tour to South Africa to take his 300 Test wickets in 61 matches. He reached the landmark in 8 years and 16 days to become the second fastest South African bowler in terms of time taken after Shaun Pollock.

On 3 February 2013, Steyn picked up his career best test figures at home of 6/8 as Pakistan were dismissed for their lowest ever test score of 49, this was also the third cheapest six-wicket haul in the test history. He later went on to pick five more wickets in the second innings and helped South Africa win the match by 211 runs taking a 1–0 lead in the three match test series and was named man of the match.

Steyn played a cameo as himself in the 2014 romantic comedy Blended starring Adam Sandler and Drew Barrymore.

=== 2015–2021: Final years ===
Steyn took 3/78 in the first innings of the first Test of the South African tour in Bangladesh which was drawn due to stoppage by rain. Steyn took 16,634 balls to take his 400 test wickets and became the fastest bowler to complete the feat in terms of balls bowled. He took the 400th wicket when Bangladesh opener Tamim Iqbal was caught at slip by Hashim Amla on the first day of the second Test against Bangladesh on 30 July 2015. He completed the innings with figures of 3/30 while the second innings was washed out by heavy rain.

Steyn was ruled out of the away Test series against Australia in 2016–17 after he broke his right shoulder bone in the first Test in Perth.

....one could make a very strong case for Steyn being best fast bowler post the Second World War, especially when you consider the abundant advantages afforded to batsmen in recent times.....

— 2015 article Is Dale Steyn the greatest fast bowler post WWII? by Glenn Mitchell

Recovering from surgery, he missed the 2017 ICC Champions Trophy but was named in the South Africa A squad for their tour of England a few months later. However, he returned to competitive cricket in November 2017, a year after the injury, playing for the Titans at the Ram Slam T20 Challenge. After 14 months of injury, Steyn played his first international Test match against India and picked up a wicket in just 14 balls. However, on day two of the same Test, Steyn damaged his left heel. This ruled him out of the rest of the series, with a recovery time of 4 to 6 weeks. Two days later, he was ruled out of the rest of the series.

On 26 December 2018, he equaled Shaun Pollock's record as the highest wicket-taker in South African test history. On 14 September, he was called back to the South African ODI squad after an absence of two years. On 3 October, he scored his maiden half-century in ODI cricket against Zimbabwe in a 120 run victory.

In December 2018, in the first session of the Boxing Day Test at SuperSport Park in Centurion, Steyn became South Africa's leading wicket-taker in Tests, taking his 422nd wicket, surpassing Shaun Pollock who had held the record for ten years.

In April 2019, he was named in South Africa's squad for the 2019 Cricket World Cup. However, on 4 June 2019, Steyn was ruled out of the tournament due to an ongoing shoulder injury, and was replaced by Beuran Hendricks. In August 2019, Steyn retired from Test cricket.

On 31 August 2021, Steyn announced his retirement from all forms of cricket.

== Coaching career ==
In December 2021, Steyn was appointed as the fast bowling coach of Indian Premier League team Sunrisers Hyderabad for the 2022 IPL season.

In May 2023, Steyn was appointed as bowling coach of Major League Cricket team Washington Freedom.

In July 2025, Dale Steyn announced his departure from the SA20 franchise Sunrisers Eastern Cape, where he served as the bowling coach for three seasons. Under his guidance, the team reached the finals in all three editions, clinching the title twice and finishing as runner-up in the 2025 season.

Expressing gratitude on social media, Steyn described his time with the team as a "great pleasure" and praised the management and coaching staff as the best he had worked with. He extended his best wishes to the team for the upcoming season, marking the end of a successful coaching stint with the franchise.

== In the media ==
- Steyn appeared on Sporting Edge mastermind podcast, hosted by former England cricketer, Jeremy Snape
- Steyn appeared in the film, Blended (2014) starring Adam Sandler, as himself.

== Playing style ==
Steyn is an aggressive out-and-out fast bowler capable of bowling at speeds in excess of 150 km/h, his fastest being 156.7 km/h (97.3 mph) for Royal Challengers Bangalore against Kolkata Knight Riders in the 2010 Indian Premier League. He can generate great amounts of swing and is usually chosen to bowl with the new ball to maximize these attributes. He usually bowls between 140 km/h and 150 km/h and is also a reverse swing specialist with the older ball and can prove lethal even in lifeless tracks like he bowled in a Test match against India in Nagpur in 2010, which South Africa won by an innings and six runs. Steyn is an extremely competitive cricketer and often celebrates vigorously after taking a wicket. He has stated that he "love(s) the buzz from bowling fast" and that he "want(s) to be the quickest in the world". In a segment for ESPN, Allan Donald named Steyn the best bowler of all time.

== Honours ==
- ICC Test Player of the Year: 2008
- ICC Test Team of the Year: 2008, 2009, 2010, 2011, 2012, 2013, 2014, 2016
- ICC ODI Team of the Year: 2011, 2014
- ICC Test Team of the Decade: 2011–2020
- South African Cricketer of the Year: 2008
- Wisden Cricketer of the Year: 2014
- Wisden Leading Cricketer: 2013
