= Leg cutter =

Cricket bowling technique

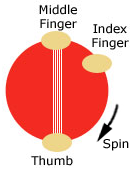
Leg-cutter grip for a right handed bowler (batsman's view).

A leg cutter is a type of delivery in the sport of cricket. It is bowled by fast bowlers.

A bowler releases a normal spin delivery with the wrist locked in position and the first two fingers positioned on top of the cricket ball, giving it spin about a horizontal axis perpendicular to the length of the pitch. For a leg cutter, a right-handed bowler pulls his fingers down the left side of the ball (from his viewpoint), rolling the ball out of his hand over the little finger, in an action similar to bowling a leg break, only at higher speed. This changes the axis of spin to make it more like a leg break, which makes the ball deviate to the left when it bounces on the pitch. From a right-handed batsman's point of view, this deviation is to the right, or from the leg side towards the off side. This deviation is known as cut, and the delivery is called a leg cutter because it moves away from the leg side.

What differentiates a genuine leg cutter from a seam-up delivery that simply moves away off the seam is that it is deliberately bowled.

Leg cutters do not turn as sharply as leg breaks bowled by a leg spin bowler, but at the speed of a fast bowler even a tiny deviation can cause difficulties for the batsman. If he is not quick enough to react to the movement, the batsman can edge the ball off the outside edge of his bat, offering a catch to the wicket-keeper or slips fielders.

A fast bowler will typically use the leg cutter as a variation ball as it is most effective when it surprises the batsman. The leg cutter action can also produce a significantly slower ball with little obvious change in the bowler's arm speed, making the delivery doubly deceptive. On the other hand, the lack of pace of the delivery may be disadvantageous. Former Australian captain Ian Chappell described Jeff Thomson's leg cutter thus: "He had this leg cutter, and you were usually pretty happy to see it, because it meant that the ball wasn't coming at your head at 95 miles an hour."

The most prominent users of leg cutter include Alec Bedser, Fazal Mahmood and of late Terry Alderman, Carl Rackemann and Venkatesh Prasad.

Leg cutters are much more frequently seen in indoor cricket as the physical arena in which the game is played limits the pace at which bowlers can bowl, and hence they must use other techniques to prevent the batsmen from scoring.

== See also ==
- Off cutter
