= Fast bowling =

Bowling technique in cricket

Fast bowling (also referred to as pace bowling) is a type of bowling in cricket, in which the ball is delivered at high speed. The fastest bowlers bowl the ball at over 86 mph (138 km/h). Practitioners of fast bowling are known as fast bowlers or quicks. Also included in this broad category are bowlers who do not achieve the highest speeds, who may instead be known by a range of other terms, such as medium fast bowlers.

In addition to delivering the ball at speed, this type of bowler may also use seam bowling or swing bowling techniques, to make it even harder for the batter to play the ball correctly. The mixture of speed, seam and swing that can be achieved depends on several factors, including the individual bowler's skill, the condition of the ball, and the weather. Seam and swing are particularly important for bowlers who do not achieve the highest speeds. Therefore, they might also be referred to as a seam bowler, a swing bowler, or a fast bowler who can swing it, for example, if this is the predominant characteristic of their deliveries. Strictly speaking, a pure swing bowler does not need to have a high degree of pace, though dedicated medium-pace swing bowlers are rarely seen at Test level in modern times.

Fast bowling is one of the two main approaches to bowling, the other being spin bowling.

== Terminology ==
Pace bowlers may be classified based on quantitative or qualitative attributes.

A widespread method of classification is based on average ball release speed. However, there is no universally accepted set of definitions and the categorisation of bowlers according to speed may take into account competition level and gender. Terms used in different classifications include "slow medium", "medium", "fast medium", "fast" and "express". Cricinfo, a popular cricket news website, uses both "medium fast" and "fast medium" in addition to "medium" and "fast".

Bowlers may be categorised according to their use of swing bowling or seam bowling techniques, although the term "seamer" is also commonly used to refer to pace bowlers in general.

== Strike bowling ==
Strike bowling is the term usually applied to bowlers who are used primarily to take wickets rather than restrict runs. Typically, strike bowlers work in short spells, either at the start of an innings or to confront new batters, although they are also employed tactically at other times. For fast bowlers, results can be achieved through sheer speed and aggression, rather than by trying to make the ball move through the air (swing bowling) or off the pitch (seam bowling). More commonly, however, a combined approach is adopted to produce balls that the batter finds difficult or impossible to play, whatever the speed at which they are delivered. In this respect, the inswinging yorker is a good example of delivery that, even when bowled relatively slowly, can nevertheless be highly effective.

== Swing bowling ==
Swing bowlers cause the ball to move laterally through the air, rather than off the pitch like seam bowlers. Normal or conventional swing bowling is encouraged by the raised seam of the ball, and conventional swing is usually greatest when the ball is new and therefore has a pronounced seam. As the ball gets older, the wear makes swing more difficult to achieve, but this can be countered if the fielding team systematically polishes one side of the ball while allowing the other to become rough. When the ball has been polished highly on one side and not on the other and if the ball is bowled very fast (over 85 miles per hour (140 km/h)), it produces a reverse swing such that the ball swings in the opposite direction as in conventional swing. Contrary to popular opinion, this swing is not produced by air flowing faster over the smooth or "shiny" side as compared to the rough side.

Swing is produced due to a net force acting on the ball from one side; that is, the side with the more turbulent boundary layer. For conventional swing bowling, the raised seam and the direction it points governs the direction of swing. Due to the angled seam of the ball, air flowing over the seam produces turbulence on the side that the seam is angled toward. This causes the boundary layer to separate from the surface of the ball later (further toward the rear of the ball) than the other side where it separates earlier (further forward on the surface). The resulting net force acts so as to move or swing the ball in the direction of the angled seam. Conventional swing bowling is delivered with the seam angled such that the smooth or polished side of the ball faces forward to move the ball in the direction of the seam i.e. toward the rough side.

A swinging ball is classed as either an outswinger, which moves away from the batter, or an inswinger, which moves in toward the batter. In most cases the outswinger is seen as the more dangerous ball because, if the batter fails to recognise it, it catches the outside edge of the bat instead of the middle and fly up to be caught in the slips. Inswingers have their place too, especially combined with the yorker as this can result in the ball either breaking the wicket (by going clean "through the gate" or getting an inside edge) or hitting the pad rather than the bat (resulting in a possible LBW decision).

Swing bowling can also be roughly categorised as early swing or late swing, corresponding to when in the trajectory the ball changes direction. The later the ball swings, the less chance the batter has of adjusting to account for the swing.

Bowlers usually use the same grip and technique on swing balls as fast balls, though they usually keep the seam slightly rather than straight, and may use the slower ball grip. It is difficult to achieve swing with a cutter grip since the ball spins in flight, varying the orientation of the shiny and rough surfaces as it moves through the air. Many players, commentators on the game, and fans agree that swing is easier to achieve in humid or overcast conditions, and also that the red ball used in Test cricket swings more than the white ball used in the one-day game.

=== Reverse swing ===
Reverse swing is a phenomenon that makes the ball swing in the opposite direction to that usually produced by the orientation of the shiny and rough sides of the ball. When the ball is reverse swinging, the ball swings towards the shiny side. Balls that reverse swing move much later and much more sharply than those swinging conventionally, both factors increasing the difficulty the batter has in trying to hit the ball. At speeds of over 90 mph a ball always exhibits reverse swing, but as roughness increases on the leading side, the speed at which reverse swing occurs decreases. This means that an older ball is more likely to be delivered with reverse swing as its surface is roughened through use.

In reverse swing the seam is angled in the same way as in conventional swing (10–20 degrees to one side) but the boundary layer on both sides is turbulent. The net effect of the seam and rough side is that the ball swings in the direction opposite to where the seam is pointing to. The turbulent boundary layer separating later is similar to the effect produced by dimples in a golf ball. In case of the golf ball, turbulence is produced on both sides of the ball and the net effect is a later separation of the boundary layer on both sides and smaller wake in the back of the ball and a lower net drag due to pressure differential between the front and the back. This enables the golf ball to travel further.

The discovery of reverse swing is credited to Pakistan's cricketers, with Sarfraz Nawaz and Farrukh Ahmed Khan, both named as originators of the delivery.

== Risks of injuries ==
Fast bowlers typically experience the highest incidence of injury of all player roles in cricket. The largest time-loss injuries are typically associated with overuse at the site of the lumbar spine. Common injuries include spondylolisthesis (stress fracture of the lower back), navicular stress fractures in the foot, shoulder injuries or lesions, side strains or intercostal strains and muscular strains of the calves, hamstrings or spinal erectors. Popular media and commentators are often critical of the number of injuries suffered by fast bowlers. However, as of 2019, injury rates are at their lowest in decades, in many parts thanks to advances in physical conditioning, sport science, and load management interventions.

== Top five fast bowlers ==
Top five fast bowlers in Tests by wickets taken
Name	Wickets taken
(England) James Anderson	704
(England) Stuart Broad	604
(Australia) Glenn McGrath	563
(Cricket West Indies) Courtney Walsh	519
(Australia) Mitchell Starc	445

Top five fast bowlers in ODIs by wickets taken
Name	Wickets taken
(Pakistan) Wasim Akram	502
(Pakistan) Waqar Younis	416
(Sri Lanka) Chaminda Vaas	400
(South Africa) Shaun Pollock	393
(Australia) Glenn McGrath	381

Top five fast bowlers in T20Is by wickets taken
Name	Wickets taken
(New Zealand) Tim Southee	164
(Bangladesh) Mustafizur Rahman	128
(Ireland) Mark Adair	122
(Oman) Bilal Khan	110
(England) Chris Jordan	108

Fastest Recorded Deliveries in Cricket
Bowler	km/h (mph)
(Pakistan) Shoaib Akhtar	161.3(100.23)
(Australia) Shaun Tait	161.1(100.14)
(Australia) Brett Lee	161.1(100.14)
(Australia) Jeff Thomson	160.6(99.8)
(Australia) Mitchell Starc	160.4(99.7)

NB: The above figures all exclude matches in progress

== See also ==
- Glossary of cricket terms
- Types of bowlers in cricket

== Bibliography ==
- Hughes, Simon (2002), Jargonbusting: The Analyst's Guide to Test Cricket, Channel 4 books, ISBN 0-7522-6508-3
- Lewis, Tony (Editor) (1995), MCC Masterclass, Weidenfeld & Nicolson, ISBN 0-297-81578-4
