= International cricket in 1999 =

The 1999 international cricket season was from April 1999 to September 1999.

== Season overview ==
International tours
Start date	Home team	Away team	Results [Matches]			
Start date	Home team	Away team	Test	ODI	FC	LA
1 July 1999	England	New Zealand	1–2 [4]	—	—	—
9 September 1999	Sri Lanka	Australia	1–0 [3]	—	—	—
International tournaments
Start date	Tournament				Winners	
14 May 1999	(United Kingdom) 1999 Cricket World Cup				Australia	
22 August 1999	(Sri Lanka) 1999 Aiwa Cup				Sri Lanka	
2 September 1999	1999 Singapore Challenge				West Indies	
11 September 1999	(Canada) 1999 DMC Cup				India	
16 September 1999	(Canada) 1999 DCM Trophy				Pakistan	

== May ==
=== 1999 Cricket World Cup ===
Group A
Team	Pld	W	L	NR	T	NRR	Pts	PCF
South Africa	5	4	1	0	0	0.86	8	2
India	5	3	2	0	0	1.28	6	0
Zimbabwe	5	3	2	0	0	0.02	6	4
England	5	3	2	0	0	−0.33	6	N/A
Sri Lanka	5	2	3	0	0	−0.81	4	N/A
Kenya	5	0	5	0	0	−1.20	0	N/A

Group B
Team	Pld	W	L	NR	T	NRR	Pts	PCF
Pakistan	5	4	1	0	0	0.51	8	4
Australia	5	3	2	0	0	0.73	6	0
New Zealand	5	3	2	0	0	0.58	6	2
West Indies	5	3	2	0	0	0.50	6	N/A
Bangladesh	5	2	3	0	0	−0.52	4	N/A
Scotland	5	0	5	0	0	−1.93	0	N/A

Super-Six
Team	Pld	W	L	NR	T	NRR	Pts	PCF
Pakistan	5	3	2	0	0	0.65	6	4
Australia	5	3	2	0	0	0.36	6	0
South Africa	5	3	2	0	0	0.17	6	2
New Zealand	5	2	2	1	0	−0.52	5	2
Zimbabwe	5	2	2	1	0	−0.79	5	4
India	5	1	4	0	0	−0.15	2	0

Group stage
No.	Date	Team 1	Captain 1	Team 2	Captain 2	Venue	Result
ODI 1443	14 May	England	Alec Stewart	Sri Lanka	Arjuna Ranatunga	Lord's, London	England by 8 wickets
ODI 1444	14 May	India	Mohammad Azharuddin	South Africa	Hansie Cronje	County Cricket Ground, Hove	South Africa by 4 wickets
ODI 1445	15 May	Kenya	Aasif Karim	Zimbabwe	Alistair Campbell	County Ground, Taunton, Taunton	Zimbabwe by 4 wickets
ODI 1446	16 May	Australia	Steve Waugh	Scotland	George Salmond	New Road, Worcester	Australia by 6 wickets
ODI 1447	16 May	Pakistan	Wasim Akram	West Indies	Brian Lara	Bristol County Ground, Bristol	Pakistan by 27 runs
ODI 1448	17 May	Bangladesh	Aminul Islam	New Zealand	Stephen Fleming	County Cricket Ground, Chelmsford	New Zealand by 6 wickets
ODI 1449	18 May	England	Alec Stewart	Kenya	Aasif Karim	St Lawrence Ground, Canterbury	England by 9 wickets
ODI 1450	19 May	India	Mohammad Azharuddin	Zimbabwe	Alistair Campbell	Grace Road, Leicester	Zimbabwe by 3 runs
ODI 1451	14 May	South Africa	Hansie Cronje	Sri Lanka	Arjuna Ranatunga	County Cricket Ground, Northampton	South Africa by 89 runs
ODI 1452	20 May	Australia	Steve Waugh	New Zealand	Stephen Fleming	Sophia Gardens, Cardiff	New Zealand by 5 wickets
ODI 1453	20 May	Pakistan	Wasim Akram	Scotland	George Salmond	Riverside Ground, Chester-le-Street	Pakistan by 94 runs
ODI 1454	21 May	Bangladesh	Aminul Islam	West Indies	Brian Lara	Castle Avenue, Dublin	West Indies by 7 wickets
ODI 1455	22 May	England	Alec Stewart	South Africa	Hansie Cronje	The Oval, London	South Africa by 122 runs
ODI 1456	22 May	Sri Lanka	Arjuna Ranatunga	Zimbabwe	Alistair Campbell	New Road, Worcester	Sri Lanka by 4 wickets
ODI 1457	23 May	India	Mohammad Azharuddin	Kenya	Aasif Karim	Bristol County Ground, Bristol	India by 94 runs
ODI 1458	23 May	Australia	Steve Waugh	Pakistan	Wasim Akram	Headingley Cricket Ground, Leeds	Pakistan by 10 runs
ODI 1459	24 May	Scotland	George Salmond	Bangladesh	Aminul Islam	The Grange, Edinburgh	Bangladesh by 22 runs
ODI 1460	24 May	New Zealand	Stephen Fleming	West Indies	Brian Lara	County Ground, Southampton	West Indies by 7 wickets
ODI 1461	25 May	England	Alec Stewart	Zimbabwe	Alistair Campbell	Trent Bridge, Nottingham	England by 7 wickets
ODI 1462	26 May	Kenya	Aasif Karim	South Africa	Hansie Cronje	VRA Cricket Ground, Amstelveen	South Africa by 7 wickets
ODI 1463	26 May	India	Mohammad Azharuddin	Sri Lanka	Arjuna Ranatunga	County Ground, Taunton	India by 157 runs
ODI 1464	27 May	Australia	Steve Waugh	Bangladesh	Aminul Islam	Riverside Ground, Chester-le-Street	Australia by 7 wickets
ODI 1465	27 May	Scotland	George Salmond	West Indies	Brian Lara	Grace Road, Leicester	West Indies by 8 wickets
ODI 1466	28 May	Pakistan	Wasim Akram	New Zealand	Stephen Fleming	County Cricket Ground, Derby	Pakistan by 62 runs
ODI 1467	29–30 May	England	Alec Stewart	India	Mohammad Azharuddin	Edgbaston Cricket Ground, Birmingham	India by 63 runs
ODI 1468	29 May	South Africa	Hansie Cronje	Zimbabwe	Alistair Campbell	County Cricket Ground, Chelmsford	Zimbabwe by 48 runs
ODI 1469	30 May	Kenya	Aasif Karim	Sri Lanka	Arjuna Ranatunga	County Ground, Southampton	South Africa by 45 runs
ODI 1470	30 May	Australia	Steve Waugh	West Indies	Brian Lara	Old Trafford Cricket Ground, Manchester	Australia by 6 wickets
ODI 1471	31 May	Pakistan	Wasim Akram	Bangladesh	Aminul Islam	County Cricket Ground, Northampton	Bangladesh by 62 runs
ODI 1472	31 May	Scotland	George Salmond	New Zealand	Stephen Fleming	The Grange, Edinburgh	New Zealand by 6 wickets
Super six stage
No.	Date	Team 1	Captain 1	Team 2	Captain 2	Venue	Result
ODI 1473	4 June	Australia	Steve Waugh	India	Mohammad Azharuddin	The Oval, London	Australia by 77 runs
ODI 1474	5 June	Pakistan	Wasim Akram	South Africa	Hansie Cronje	Trent Bridge, Nottingham	South Africa by 3 wickets
ODI 1475	6–7 June	New Zealand	Stephen Fleming	Zimbabwe	Alistair Campbell	Headingley Cricket Ground, Leeds	No result
ODI 1476	8 June	India	Mohammad Azharuddin	Pakistan	Wasim Akram	Old Trafford Cricket Ground, Manchester	India by 47 runs
ODI 1477	9 June	Australia	Steve Waugh	Zimbabwe	Alistair Campbell	Lord's, London	Australia by 44 runs
ODI 1478	10 June	New Zealand	Stephen Fleming	South Africa	Hansie Cronje	Edgbaston Cricket Ground, Birmingham	South Africa by 74 runs
ODI 1479	11 June	Pakistan	Wasim Akram	Zimbabwe	Alistair Campbell	The Oval, London	Pakistan by 148 runs
ODI 1480	12 June	India	Mohammad Azharuddin	New Zealand	Stephen Fleming	Trent Bridge, Nottingham	New Zealand by 5 wickets
ODI 1481	13 June	Australia	Steve Waugh	South Africa	Hansie Cronje	Headingley Cricket Ground, Leeds	South Africa by 5 wickets
Semi-Finals
No.	Date	Team 1	Captain 1	Team 2	Captain 2	Venue	Result
ODI 1482	16 June	New Zealand	Stephen Fleming	Pakistan	Wasim Akram	Old Trafford Cricket Ground, Manchester	Pakistan by 9 wickets
ODI 1483	17 June	Australia	Steve Waugh	South Africa	Hansie Cronje	Edgbaston Cricket Ground, Birmingham	Match tied
Final
No.	Date	Team 1	Captain 1	Team 2	Captain 2	Venue	Result
ODI 1484	20 June	Australia	Steve Waugh	Pakistan	Wasim Akram	Lord's, London	Australia by 8 wickets

== July ==
=== New Zealand in England ===
Test series
No.	Date	Home captain	Away captain	Venue	Result
Test 1455	1–3 July	Nasser Hussain	Stephen Fleming	Edgbaston Cricket Ground, Birmingham	England by 7 wickets
Test 1456	22–25 July	Nasser Hussain	Stephen Fleming	Lord's, London	New Zealand by 9 wickets
Test 1457	5–9 August	Mark Butcher	Stephen Fleming	Old Trafford, Manchester	Match drawn
Test 1458	19–23 August	Nasser Hussain	Stephen Fleming	The Oval, London	New Zealand by 83 runs

== August ==
=== 1999 Aiwa Cup ===
Team	Pld	W	L	T	NR	NRR	Pts
Australia	4	4	0	0	0	+0.889	8
Sri Lanka	4	1	3	0	0	-0.354	2
India	4	1	3	0	0	-0.533	2

Group stage
No.	Date	Team 1	Captain 1	Team 2	Captain 2	Venue	Result
ODI 1485	22 August	Sri Lanka	Sanath Jayasuriya	Australia	Steve Waugh	Galle International Stadium, Galle	Australia by 50 runs (D/L method)
ODI 1486	23 August	Australia	Steve Waugh	India	Sachin Tendulkar	Galle International Stadium, Galle	Australia by 8 wickets (D/L method)
ODI 1487	25 August	Sri Lanka	Sanath Jayasuriya	India	Sachin Tendulkar	R. Premadasa Stadium, Colombo	Sri Lanka by 7 wickets
ODI 1488	26 August	Sri Lanka	Sanath Jayasuriya	Australia	Steve Waugh	R. Premadasa Stadium, Colombo	Australia by 27 runs
ODI 1489	28 August	Australia	Steve Waugh	India	Ajay Jadeja	Singhalese Sports Club Cricket Ground, Colombo	Australia by 41 runs
ODI 1490	29 August	Sri Lanka	Sanath Jayasuriya	India	Sachin Tendulkar	Singhalese Sports Club Cricket Ground, Colombo	India by 23 runs (D/L method)
Final
No.	Date	Team 1	Captain 1	Team 2	Captain 2	Venue	Result
ODI 1491	31 August	Sri Lanka	Sanath Jayasuriya	Australia	Steve Waugh	R. Premadasa Stadium, Colombo	Sri Lanka by 8 wickets

=== Australia in Sri Lanka ===
Test series
No.	Date	Home captain	Away captain	Venue	Result
Test 1459	9–11 September	Sanath Jayasuriya	Steve Waugh	Asgiriya Stadium, Kandy	Sri Lanka by 6 wickets
Test 1460	22–26 September	Sanath Jayasuriya	Steve Waugh	Galle International Stadium, Galle	Match drawn
Test 1461	30 September–4 October	Sanath Jayasuriya	Steve Waugh	Singhalese Sports Club Cricket Ground, Colombo	Match drawn

== September ==
=== 1999 Coca-Cola Singapore Challenge ===
Team	P	W	L	T	NR	Points	NRR
West Indies	2	2	0	0	0	4	+1.039
India	2	1	1	0	0	2	+1.125
Zimbabwe	2	0	2	0	0	0	−1.945

Group stage
No.	Date	Team 1	Captain 1	Team 2	Captain 2	Venue	Result
ODI 1492	2 September	West Indies	Brian Lara	Zimbabwe	Alistair Campbell	Kallang Ground, Singapore	West Indies by 6 wickets
ODI 1493	4 September	India	Sachin Tendulkar	Zimbabwe	Alistair Campbell	Kallang Ground, Singapore	India by 115 runs
ODI 1494	5 September	India	Sourav Ganguly	West Indies	Brian Lara	Kallang Ground, Singapore	West Indies by 42 runs
Finals
No.	Date	Team 1	Captain 1	Team 2	Captain 2	Venue	Result
ODI 1495	7 September	India	Sachin Tendulkar	West Indies	Brian Lara	Kallang Ground, Singapore	No result
ODI 1496	8 September	India	Sachin Tendulkar	West Indies	Brian Lara	Kallang Ground, Singapore	West Indies by 4 wickets

=== 1999 DMC Cup ===
ODI series
No.	Date	Home captain	Away captain	Venue	Result
ODI 1497	11 September	Sourav Ganguly	Brian Lara	Toronto Cricket, Skating and Curling Club Ground, Canada	India by 8 wickets
ODI 1498	12 September	Sourav Ganguly	Brian Lara	Toronto Cricket, Skating and Curling Club Ground, Canada	West Indies by 70 runs
ODI 1499	14 September	Sourav Ganguly	Brian Lara	Toronto Cricket, Skating and Curling Club Ground, Canada	India by 88 runs

=== 1999 DCM Trophy ===
ODI series
No.	Date	Home captain	Away captain	Venue	Result
ODI 1500	16 September	Wasim Akram	Brian Lara	Toronto Cricket, Skating and Curling Club Ground, Canada	Pakistan by 15 runs
ODI 1501	18 September	Wasim Akram	Brian Lara	Toronto Cricket, Skating and Curling Club Ground, Canada	Pakistan by 42 runs
ODI 1502	19 September	Moin Khan	Brian Lara	Toronto Cricket, Skating and Curling Club Ground, Canada	Pakistan by 7 wickets
