= 1966 in association football =

The following are the football (soccer) events of the year 1966 throughout the world.

== Events ==
- Copa Libertadores 1966: Won by Peñarol after defeating River Plate on an aggregate score of 4–2.
- Real Madrid won the European Cup defeating Partizan 2–1.
- November 6 – Johan Cruijff becomes the first player in history of the Netherlands national football team who receives a red card, when he is expelled by East-German referee Rudi Glöckner in the friendly against Czechoslovakia.

== Winners club national championship ==
=== Asia ===
- Qatar: Al-Maref

=== Europe ===
- Austria: FC Admira Wacker Mödling
- Belgium: Anderlecht
- Czechoslovakia: Dukla Prague
- England: Liverpool
- France: Nantes
- Italy: Inter Milan
- Netherlands: Ajax
- Portugal: Sporting C.P.
- Scotland: Celtic
- Soviet Union: Dynamo Kiev
- Spain: Atlético Madrid
- Switzerland: FC Zürich
- Turkey: Beşiktaş J.K.
- West Germany: TSV 1860 München
- Yugoslavia: FK Vojvodina

=== North America ===
- Mexico: América

=== South America ===
- Argentina: Racing Club
- Brazil: Cruzeiro

== International tournaments ==
- 1966 British Home Championship (October 2, 1965 – April 2, 1966)

England

- FIFA World Cup in England (July 11 – 29 1966)
  1. England
  2. West Germany
  3. Portugal

== Clubs Founded ==
- PAS Giannina (Greece)

== Births ==
- January 13 – Gerardo Esquivel, Mexican footballer
- January 15 – Rommel Fernández, Panamanian striker (d. 1993)
- January 29 – Romário, Brazilian footballer
- February 1 – Michelle Akers, American women's soccer player
- February 4 – Egidio Notaristefano, Italian footballer and manager
- February 8 – Hristo Stoichkov, Bulgarian footballer
- March 27 – Ramiro Castillo, Bolivian footballer (d. 1997)
- April 2 – Teddy Sheringham, English footballer
- April 9 – Thomas Doll, German footballer and manager
- April 14 – Suzana Cavalheiro, Brazilian footballer
- May 12 – Vladimir Quesada, Costa Rican footballer
- May 24 – Eric Cantona, French footballer
- May 30 – Thomas Häßler, German footballer
- June 6 – Fernando Kanapkis, Uruguayan footballer
- June 12
  - Nélson Bertolazzi, Brazilian former footballer
  - Albeiro Usuriaga (died 2004), Colombian footballer
- June 14 – Nelson Cossio, Chilean footballer
- June 14 – Byron Tenorio, Ecuadorian footballer
- June 21 – Guillermo Sanguinetti, Uruguayan footballer
- June 26 – Abel Shongwe, retired Swazi footballer
- June 29 – Massimo Brambati, Italian footballer
- July 1 – Frank De Bleeckere, Belgian soccer referee
- July 5 – Gianfranco Zola, Italian international footballer
- July 7 – Henk Fräser, Dutch footballer
- July 28 – Miguel Ángel Nadal, Spanish footballer
- August 2 – Anzor Koblev, Russian professional football coach and former player
- August 13 – Miguel Miranda, Peruvian footballer
- August 22
  - Laurent Cadu, French former professional footballer
  - Luca Lurati, retired Swiss footballer
  - Michel van Oostrum, Dutch footballer
  - Rob Witschge, Dutch international footballer
- October 5 – Wilfred Agbonavbare, Nigerian international footballer (died 2015)
- October 16 – Stefan Reuter, German international footballer
- October 19 – José Carpio, Ecuadorian football referee
- November 10 – Michael Voss, former cricketer at CricketArchive
- December 3 – Flemming Povlsen, Danish international footballer

=== Unknown date ===
- Ibrahim Chaibou, Nigerien football referee

== Deaths ==
- March 27 – Hermann Garrn, German forward, capped 2 times for the Germany national football team (78)
- April 29 – Sílvio Lagreca, Brazilian manager, first ever manager of the Brazil national football team (70)
- May 2 – Agostinho Fortes Filho, Brazilian midfielder, squad member at the 1930 FIFA World Cup (64)
- September 3 - John Nicholson, English footballer, started career at Liverpool (29)
- September 17 – Mário Filho, Brazilian legendary football journalist who revolutionized football coverage in Brazil. The Maracanã Stadium was named after him after his death (58)
- December 26 – Guillermo Stábile, Argentine striker, runner-up and top scorer of the 1930 FIFA World Cup (61)
