= 2004 NatWest Series =

- Part of New Zealand cricket team in England in 2004 and West Indian cricket team in England in 2004
- Date: 24 June–10 July 2004
- Location: England
- Result: New Zealand beat the West Indies in the final
- Player of the series: Stephen Fleming (NZ)
Teams
England	New Zealand	West Indies
Captains
Michael Vaughan	Stephen Fleming	Brian Lara
Most runs
Andrew Strauss (256)	Stephen Fleming (254)	Chris Gayle (276)
Most wickets
Steve Harmison (7) James Anderson (7)	Jacob Oram (7)	Dwayne Bravo (10)

The 2004 NatWest Series was a One Day International cricket tri-series sponsored by the National Westminster Bank that took place in England between 24 June and 10 July 2004. The series involved the national teams of England, New Zealand and the West Indies. Ten matches were played in total, with each team playing one another twice during the group stage. The teams which finished in the top two positions following the group stages qualified for the final, which New Zealand won by defeating the West Indies at Lord's on 10 July by 107 runs.

== Venues ==
Manchester	Birmingham	Nottingham	Chester-le-Street	Leeds
Old Trafford; Capacity: 15,000	Edgbaston; Capacity: 21,000	Trent Bridge; Capacity: 15,000	Riverside Ground; Capacity: 19,000	Headingley; Capacity: 17,500
2004 NatWest Series is located in England
Cardiff	Bristol	London	Southampton	
Sophia Gardens; Capacity: 5,500	County Ground; Capacity: 16,000	Lord's; Capacity: 28,000	Rose Bowl; Capacity: 15,000	

== Squads ==
England	New Zealand	West Indies
Michael Vaughan (c); James Anderson; Ian Blackwell; Rikki Clarke; Paul Collingwood; Andrew Flintoff; Ashley Giles; Darren Gough; Steve Harmison; Geraint Jones (wk); Rob Key; Anthony McGrath; Sajid Mahmood; Mike Powell; Andrew Strauss; Marcus Trescothick	Stephen Fleming (c); Andre Adams; Nathan Astle; Ian Butler; Chris Cairns; James Franklin; Chris Harris; Gareth Hopkins (wk); Brendon McCullum (wk); Craig McMillan; Hamish Marshall; Jacob Oram; Michael Papps; Scott Styris; Daryl Tuffey; Daniel Vettori	Brian Lara (c); Carlton Baugh (wk); Tino Best; Ian Bradshaw; Dwayne Bravo; Shivnarine Chanderpaul; Chris Gayle; Ridley Jacobs (wk); Jermaine Lawson; Ricardo Powell; Ravi Rampaul; Darren Sammy; Ramnaresh Sarwan; Dwayne Smith; Devon Smith

== Fixtures ==
Team	Pld	W	L	NR	BP	CP	Pts	NRR
New Zealand	6	3	0	3	1	0	25	+1.403
West Indies	6	2	2	2	1	1	18	-0.376
England	6	1	4	1	1	2	11	-0.578

24 June
Scorecard

England	v	New Zealand

Match abandoned
Old Trafford, Manchester
Umpires: Daryl Harper (Aus) and David Shepherd (Eng)

- No toss made.
- Points: England 3; New Zealand 3

26 June
Scorecard

West Indies; 122/4 (21 overs)	v	New Zealand; 97/2 (13.4 overs)
Brian Lara 36 (22); Chris Cairns 1/18 (4 overs)		Scott Styris 26* (26); Jermaine Lawson 2/18 (3 overs)

No result
Edgbaston, Birmingham
Umpires: Rudi Koertzen (SA) and Jeremy Lloyds (Eng)

- New Zealand won the toss and elected to field.
- The match was reduced before play started to 35 overs per side. The match was reduced to 21 overs per side, New Zealand target was 140 runs.
- Points: New Zealand 3; West Indies 3

27 June
Scorecard

England; 147 (38.2 overs)	v	West Indies; 148/3 (32.2 overs)
Andrew Strauss 43 (63); Dwayne Bravo 3/26 (10 overs)		Chris Gayle 60* (90); James Anderson 2/39 (7.2 overs)

West Indies won by 7 wickets
Trent Bridge, Nottingham
Umpires: Mark Benson (Eng) and Daryl Harper (Aus)
Player of the match: Dwayne Bravo (WI)

- West Indies won the toss and elected to field.
- Points: England 0; West Indies 6

29 June
Scorecard

England; 101 (32.5 overs)	v	New Zealand; 103/3 (17.2 overs)
Marcus Trescothick 14 (19); James Franklin 5/42 (10 overs)		Stephen Fleming 31 (34); Steve Harmison 3/38 (7 overs)

New Zealand won by 7 wickets
Riverside Ground, Chester-le-Street
Umpires: Rudi Koertzen (SA) and Jeremy Lloyds (Eng)
Player of the match: James Franklin (NZ)

- New Zealand won the toss and elected to field.
- Points: England 0; New Zealand 6

1 July
Scorecard

West Indies; 159 (40.1 overs)	v	England; 160/3 (22 overs)
Ramnaresh Sarwan 46 (78); Steve Harmison 3/31 (10 overs)		Marcus Trescothick 55 (48); Dwayne Bravo 2/29 (4 overs)

England won by 7 wickets
Headingley, Leeds
Umpires: Mark Benson (Eng) and Daryl Harper (Aus)
Player of the match: Steve Harmison (Eng)

- England won the toss and elected to field.
- Points: England 6; West Indies 0

3 July
Scorecard

West Indies; 216 (46.2 overs)	v	New Zealand; 220/5 (46 overs)
Brian Lara 58 (58); Chris Cairns 3/29 (8 overs)		Hamish Marshall 75* (119); Dwayne Bravo 3/36 (8 overs)

New Zealand won by 5 wickets
Sophia Gardens, Cardiff
Umpires: Rudi Koertzen (SA) and David Shepherd (Aus)
Player of the match: Hamish Marshall (NZ)

- New Zealand won the toss and elected to field.
- Points: New Zealand 5; West Indies 1

4 July
Scorecard

England; 237/7 (50 overs)	v	New Zealand; 241/4 (47.2 overs)
Andrew Flintoff 106 (121); Ian Butler 3/57 (10 overs)		Stephen Fleming 99 (126); Paul Collingwood 2/47 (7.2 overs)

New Zealand won by 6 wickets
Bristol County Ground, Bristol
Umpires: Mark Benson (Eng) and Daryl Harper (Aus)
Player of the match: Stephen Fleming (NZ)

- New Zealand won the toss and elected to field.
- Points: England 1; New Zealand 5

6 July
Scorecard

England; 285/7 (50 overs)	v	West Indies; 286/3 (49.1 overs)
Andrew Flintoff 123 (104); Chris Gayle 3/57 (10 overs)		Chris Gayle 132* (165); James Anderson 2/69 (9.1 overs)

West Indies won by 7 wickets
Lord's, London
Umpires: Rudi Koertzen (SA) and Jeremy Lloyds (Eng)
Player of the match: Chris Gayle (WI)

- West Indies won the toss and elected to field.
- Points: England 1; West Indies 5

8 July
Scorecard

New Zealand	v	West Indies

Match abandoned
Rose Bowl, Southampton
Umpires: Daryl Harper (Aus) and David Shepherd (Eng)

- West Indies won the toss and elected to field.
- Points: New Zealand 3; West Indies 3

=== Final ===
10 July
Scorecard

New Zealand; 266 (49.2 overs)	v	West Indies; 159 (41.2 overs)
Stephen Fleming 67 (66); Ramnaresh Sarwan 3/31 (6 overs)		Devon Smith 44 (72); Daniel Vettori 5/30 (9.2 overs)

New Zealand won by 107 runs
Lord's, London
Umpires: Rudi Koertzen (SA) and David Shepherd (Eng)
Player of the match: Daniel Vettori (NZ)

- West Indies won the toss and elected to field.

In the final at Lord's, West Indies won the toss and elected to field. On a slow Lord's pitch, New Zealand started their innings with a 120 run opening partnership between captain Stephen Fleming and Nathan Astle, before the former was dismissed by Dwayne Bravo for 67. Astle fell for 57 with the score on 143, with Bravo once again taking the dismissal. Scott Styris fell for a single run soon after, before Hamish Marshall and Craig McMillan came together to add 71 for the fourth wicket. Marshall eventually fell with the score on 217, dismissed by Chris Gayle, with McMillan being dismissed soon after by Tino Best, having made 52. A flurry of late wickets by Best and Ramnaresh Sarwan contained New Zealand's progress toward the end of the innings, with New Zealand all out after 49.2 overs for 266. Sarwan finished with the best innings bowling figures of 3/31, while Bravo and Best each chipped in with two wickets and Gayle and Devon Smith with one each. The West Indies response started poorly, with Gayle dismissed for 4 runs with the score on 5 by Jacob Oram. Devon Smith and Sarwan settled the batting with a sedate partnership of 40 for the second wicket, before Sarwan was run out. Brian Lara and Smith then took the score to 98, before the latter was run out by Daniel Vettori. Lara fell to the bowling of Vettori shortly after with the score on 105, with Bravo following one run later. Shivnarine Chanderpaul and Ricardo Powell took the score to 149, before Powell became the seventh wicket to fall. Devon Smith and Ridley Jacobs both fell with the score on 150, nine runs later Ian Bradshaw fell. Rain arrived and forced a ninety-minute delay, during which half of the Lord's crowd left. With the match seemingly headed for a reserve day, the rain stopped and play resumed with the West Indies on 159/9. No further runs were added as just after 8pm Vettori took the wicket of Chanderpaul, his fifth of the match, to hand New Zealand a 107 run victory. This was New Zealand's largest winning margin over the West Indies in One Day International's. Daniel Vettori was declared Man of the Match, while Stephen Fleming was declared Player of the Series.

== Statistics ==
Most runs		Most wickets	
(Cricket West Indies) Chris Gayle	276	(Cricket West Indies) Dwayne Bravo	10
(England) Andrew Strauss	256	(New Zealand) Jacob Oram	7
(New Zealand) Stephen Fleming	254	(England) Steve Harmison	7
(England) Andrew Flintoff	250	(England) James Anderson	7
(Cricket West Indies) Ramnaresh Sarwan	239	(New Zealand) Daniel Vettori	6
