= 2000 Singapore Challenge =

2000 Cricket Tournament

2000 Godrej Singapore Challenge
- Dates: 20 August 2000 – 27 August 2000
- Administrator: International Cricket Council
- Cricket format: One Day International
- Tournament format: Round-robin
- Host: Singapore
- Champions: South Africa
- Participants: 3
- Matches: 4
- Player of the series: (South Africa) Gary Kirsten
- Most runs: (South Africa) Gary Kirsten (191)
- Most wickets: (Pakistan) Abdul Razzaq (7)

The 2000 Singapore Challenge, also known as the 2000 Godrej Singapore Challenge for sponsorship reasons, was a One Day International cricket tournament that took place 20–27 August 2000. The tournament was held in Singapore. The tournament was won by South Africa who defeated Pakistan by 93 runs by the Duckworth–Lewis method.

== Teams ==
- New Zealand
- Pakistan
- South Africa

== Squads ==
New Zealand	Pakistan	South Africa
Stephen Fleming (C); Geoff Allott; Nathan Astle; Chris Cairns; Chris Harris; Craig McMillan; Shayne O'Connor; Adam Parore (Wk); Scott Styris; Roger Twose; Daniel Vettori; Paul Wiseman	Waqar Younis (C); Abdul Razzaq; Arshad Khan; Atiq-uz-Zaman (Wk); Azhar Mahmood; Ijaz Ahmed; Imran Nazir; Kabir Khan; Mohammad Yousuf; Saeed Anwar; Saleem Elahi; Shahid Afridi; Younis Khan	Shaun Pollock (C); Nicky Boje; Daryll Cullinan; Boeta Dippenaar; Andrew Hall; Jacques Kallis; Gary Kirsten; Lance Klusener; Neil McKenzie; Makhaya Ntini; Nic Pothas (Wk); Roger Telemachus

== Fixtures ==
=== Group stage ===
==== Points Table ====
Team	P	W	L	T	NR	Points	NRR
Pakistan	2	2	0	0	0	4	+0.533
South Africa	2	1	1	0	0	2	+0.412
New Zealand	2	0	2	0	0	0	−1.439

==== Matches ====
20 August
(Scorecard)

Pakistan; 191/6 (25 overs)	v	New Zealand; 179 all out (24.4 overs)
Ijaz Ahmed 49 (37); Geoff Allott 3/33 (5 overs)		Chris Harris 40 (30); Arshad Khan 3/45 (5 overs)

Pakistan won by 12 runs
Kallang Ground, Singapore
Umpires: Shyam Bansal & V. K. Ramaswamy
Player of the match: Ijaz Ahmed (Pakistan)

- Match was reduced before play started to 25 overs per side

23 August
(Scorecard)

Pakistan; 227/9 (50 overs)	v	South Africa; 199 all out (48.4 overs)
Ijaz Ahmed 56 (75); Jacques Kallis 2/19 (6 overs)		Gary Kirsten 54 (80); Azhar Mahmood 3/37 (10 overs)

Pakistan won by 28 runs
Kallang Ground, Singapore
Umpires: V. K. Ramaswamy & Gamini Silva
Player of the match: Abdul Razzaq (Pakistan)

25 August
(Scorecard)

New Zealand; 158 all out (47.4 overs)	v	South Africa; 159/2 (34 overs)
Chris Harris 42 (69); Shaun Pollock 3/24 (9 overs)		Gary Kirsten 75* (103); Scott Styris 1/23 (7 overs)

South Africa won by 8 wickets
Kallang Ground, Singapore
Umpires: Shyam Bansal & Gamini Silva
Player of the match: Shaun Pollock (South Africa)

==== Final ====
27 August
(Scorecard)

South Africa; 197/7 (50 overs)	v	Pakistan; 121 all out (28.1 overs)
Gary Kirsten 62 (77); Kabir Khan 2/33 (7 overs)		Ijaz Ahmed 31 (40 overs); Roger Telemachus 2/20 (6 overs)

South Africa won by 93 runs (D/L)
Kallang Ground, Singapore
Umpires: Shyam Bansal & V. K. Ramaswamy
Player of the match: Nicky Boje (South Africa)

- Match was reduced to 35 overs per side, Pakistan target was 215 runs

== Statistics ==
Most runs		Most wickets	
(South Africa) Gary Kirsten	191	(Pakistan) Abdul Razzaq	7
(Pakistan) Ijaz Ahmed	136	(South Africa) Shaun Pollock	6
(New Zealand) Chris Harris	82	(Pakistan) Kabir Khan	5
(South Africa) Andrew Hall	77	(Pakistan) Azhar Mahmood	5
(Pakistan) Mohammad Yousuf	61	(South Africa) Jacques Kallis	4

== See also ==
- 1999 Singapore Challenge
