= New Zealand cricket team in England in 2004 =

	England	New Zealand
- Dates: 20 May – 13 June 2004
Captains	Michael Vaughan; Marcus Trescothick	Stephen Fleming

Test series
- Result: England won the 3-match series 3–0
Most runs	Marcus Trescothick (322)	Mark Richardson (369)
Most wickets	Steve Harmison (21)	Chris Cairns (12)
- Player of the series: Steve Harmison (Eng) and Mark Richardson (NZ)

The New Zealand cricket team toured England in the 2004 season to play a three-match Test series against England. The series was won 3–0 by England, the first time they had won a Test series between the two teams since 1997. During the tour New Zealand also played in the NatWest Series, which was a triangular One Day International tournament featuring the West Indies and England.

England were forced into a change of captain for the first match of the series after Michael Vaughan twisted his knee during batting practice. His departure meant that Marcus Trescothick was named as the stand-in captain and Andrew Strauss was called into the team to make his debut. After scoring 112 in the first innings, becoming only the fourth player to score a debut century at Lord's, and 83 in the second, Strauss was named the player of the match. The opening match of the series was also significant because it was the final match of former England captain Nasser Hussain's career, he made 103 not out in England's second innings and hit the winning runs.

The players of the series were named as Steve Harmison of England and Mark Richardson of New Zealand. Harmison took 21 wickets, nine more than any other bowler in the series, at an average of 22.09 with best innings figures of 4/74. Richardson was the highest run-scorer of the series, he finished with 369 runs at an average of 61.50 and a highest score of 101.

== Test series ==
=== 1st Test ===
20–24 May 2004
Scorecard

New Zealand	v	England
386 (102.4 overs); Mark Richardson 93 (266); Steve Harmison 4/126 (31 overs)		441 (124.3 overs); Andrew Strauss 112 (215); Chris Martin 3/94 (27 overs)
336 (121.1 overs); Mark Richardson 101 (309); Steve Harmison 4/76 (29 overs)		282/3 (87 overs); Nasser Hussain 103* (204); Daryl Tuffey 1/32 (10 overs)

England won by 7 wickets
Lord's, London
Umpires: Darrell Hair (Aus) and Rudi Koertzen (SA)
Player of the match: Andrew Strauss (Eng)

- New Zealand won the toss and elected to bat
- Andrew Strauss (Eng) made his Test debut.
- This was Nasser Hussain's last Test match.

=== 2nd Test ===
3–7 June 2004
Scorecard

New Zealand	v	England
409 (143.2 overs); Stephen Fleming 97 (227); Steve Harmison 4/74 (36.2 overs)		526 (133.1 overs); Marcus Trescothick 132 (206); Scott Styris 3/88 (27 overs)
161 (42 overs); Mark Richardson 40 (90); Matthew Hoggard 4/75 (15 overs)		45/1 (8 overs); Marcus Trescothick 30* (29); Daryl Tuffey 1/28 (4 overs)

England won by 9 wickets
Headingley, Leeds
Umpires: Steve Bucknor (Win) and Simon Taufel (Aus)
Player of the match: Geraint Jones (Eng)

- England won the toss and elected to field

=== 3rd Test ===
10–13 June 2004
Scorecard

New Zealand	v	England
384 (121 overs); Stephen Fleming 117 (198); Steve Harmison 3/80 (32 overs)		319 (85.3 overs); Marcus Trescothick 63 (99); Chris Cairns 5/79 (23.3 overs)
218 (81 overs); Mark Richardson 49 (88); Ashley Giles 4/46 (24 overs)		284/6 (71.3 overs); Graham Thorpe 104* (171); Chris Cairns 4/108 (25 overs)

England won by 4 wickets
Trent Bridge, Nottingham
Umpires: Daryl Harper (Aus) and Simon Taufel (Aus)
Player of the match: Graham Thorpe (Eng)

- New Zealand won the toss and elected to bat
- Kyle Mills (NZ) made his Test debut.
