= 1999 Singapore Challenge =

1999 Coca-Cola Singapore Challenge
- Date: 2 – 8 September 1999
- Location: Singapore
- Result: Won by West Indies
- Player of the series: Ricardo Powell
Teams
West Indies	India	Zimbabwe
Captains
Brian Lara	Sachin Tendulkar	Alistair Campbell
Most runs
Ricardo Powell (221)	Rahul Dravid (183)	Andy Flower (152)
Most wickets
Reon King (9)	Debasis Mohanty (9)	Grant Flower (2); Andy Blignaut (2); Neil Johnson (2)

The 1999 Singapore Challenge, also referred to as the 1999 Coca-Cola Singapore Challenge due to sponsorship, was a One Day International cricket tournament which took place between 2–8 September 1999. The tournament was held in Singapore. The tournament was won by the West Indies who defeated India by 4 wickets.

== Teams ==
- India
- West Indies
- Zimbabwe

== Squads ==
India	West Indies	Zimbabwe
Sachin Tendulkar (C); Nikhil Chopra; Rahul Dravid; Sourav Ganguly; Ajay Jadeja; Sunil Joshi; Vinod Kambli; Amay Khurasiya; Anil Kumble; Debasis Mohanty; Venkatesh Prasad; Mannava Prasad (Wk); Sadagoppan Ramesh; Laxmi Shukla; Robin Singh	Brian Lara (C); Jimmy Adams; Hendy Bryan; Sherwin Campbell; Shivnarine Chanderpaul; Mervyn Dillon; Wavell Hinds; Ridley Jacobs (Wk); Reon King; Nehemiah Perry; Ricardo Powell; Courtney Walsh	Alistair Campbell (C); Andy Blignaut; Stuart Carlisle; Craig Evans; Andy Flower (Wk); Grant Flower; Murray Goodwin; Neil Johnson; Pommie Mbangwa; Henry Olonga; Paul Strang; Andrew Whittall; Craig Wishart

== Fixtures ==
=== Group stage ===
==== Points Table ====
Team	P	W	L	T	NR	Points	NRR
West Indies	2	2	0	0	0	4	+1.039
India	2	1	1	0	0	2	+1.125
Zimbabwe	2	0	2	0	0	0	−1.945

==== Matches ====
2 September
(Scorecard)

Zimbabwe; 244/9 (50 overs)	v	West Indies; 247/4 (43.4 overs)
Andy Flower 89 (99); Hendy Bryan 3/36 (10 overs)		Sherwin Campbell 63 (64); Grant Flower 2/39 (10 overs)

West Indies won by 6 wickets
Kallang Ground, Singapore
Umpires: Darrell Hair & Riazuddin
Player of the match: Ridley Jacobs (West Indies)

- Zimbabwe, elected to bat first

4 September
(Scorecard)

India; 245/6 (30 overs)	v	Zimbabwe; 130/8 (29 overs)
Ajay Jadeja 88 (61); Andy Blignaut 2/35 (6 overs)		Andy Flower 63 (69); Debasis Mohanty 3/28 (6 overs)

India won by 115 runs
Kallang Ground, Singapore
Umpires: Darrell Hair & Rudi Koertzen
Player of the match: Sachin Tendulkar (India)

- Zimbabwe, elected to field first
- Match was reduced before play started to 30 overs per side. Zimbabwe innings limited to 29 overs due to their slow over rate.

5 September
(Scorecard)

West Indies; 196/7 (30 overs)	v	India; 154/8 (30 overs)
Brian Lara 60 (43); Debasis Mohanty 3/52 (6 overs)		Rahul Dravid 39 (49); Reon King 2/25 (5 overs)

West Indies won by 42 runs
Kallang Ground, Singapore
Umpires: Rudi Koertzen & Riazuddin
Player of the match: Brian Lara (West Indies)

- West Indies, elected to bat first
- Match was reduced before play started to 30 overs per side.

==== Final ====
7 September
(Scorecard)

India; 149/6 (38.2 overs)	v	West Indies
Sachin Tendulkar 40 (65); Reon King 3/25 (8 overs)

No result
Kallang Ground, Singapore
Umpires: Darrell Hair & Rudi Koertzen

- India, elected to bat first
- Match was replayed the following day

8 September
(Scorecard)

India; 254/6 (50 overs)	v	West Indies; 255/6 (47.4 overs)
Rahul Dravid 103* (124); Nehemiah Perry 3/65 (10 overs)		Ricardo Powell 124 (93); Debasis Mohanty 3/33 (8.4 overs)

West Indies won by 4 wickets
Kallang Ground, Singapore
Umpires: Darrell Hair & Rudi Koertzen
Player of the match: Ricardo Powell (West Indies)

- West Indies, elected to field first

== Statistics ==
Most runs		Most wickets	
(Cricket West Indies) Ricardo Powell	221	(India) Debasis Mohanty	9
(India) Rahul Dravid	183	(Cricket West Indies) Reon King	9
(Zimbabwe) Andy Flower	152	(India) Nikhil Chopra	4
(Cricket West Indies) Brian Lara	126	(Cricket West Indies) Mervyn Dillon	4
(India) Sachin Tendulkar	125	(Cricket West Indies) Nehemiah Perry	4

== See also ==
- 2000 Singapore Challenge
