= 1999 DCM Trophy =

- Administrator: International Cricket Council
- Cricket format: One Day International
- Host: Canada
- Champions: Pakistan
- Participants: 2
- Matches: 3
- Most runs: (Pakistan) Yousuf Youhana (137)
- Most wickets: (Pakistan) Saqlain Mushtaq (6)

The DCM Trophy was a three match One Day International cricket series which took place between 16 and 19 September 1999. The tournament was held in Canada, and involved Pakistan and the West Indies. The tournament was won by Pakistan, who won the series 3–0. It followed the DCM Cup played at the same venue between India and the West Indies the previous week.

== Teams ==
- Pakistan
- West Indies

== Squads ==
Pakistan	West Indies
Wasim Akram (C); Abdul Razzaq; Aamer Sohail; Arshad Khan; Azhar Mahmood; Hasan Raza; Inzamam-ul-Haq; Yousuf Youhana; Moin Khan (Wk); Mushtaq Ahmed; Saeed Anwar; Saqlain Mushtaq; Shabbir Ahmed; Wajahatullah Wasti; Waqar Younis	Brian Lara (C); Jimmy Adams; Hendy Bryan; Sherwin Campbell; Shivnarine Chanderpaul; Corey Collymore; Mervyn Dillon; Chris Gayle; Adrian Griffith; Wavell Hinds; Ridley Jacobs (Wk); Reon King; Ricardo Powell; Courtney Walsh

== Fixtures ==
=== ODI series ===
==== 1st ODI ====
16 September
(Scorecard)

Pakistan; 230/6 (50 overs)	v	West Indies; 215/9 (50 overs)
Saeed Anwar 63 (96); Jimmy Adams 2/19 (7 overs)		Sherwin Campbell 69 (107); Aamer Sohail 1/14 (2 overs)

Pakistan won by 15 runs
Toronto Cricket, Skating and Curling Club, Toronto
Umpires: Daryl Harper & Dave Orchard
Player of the match: Saeed Anwar (Pakistan)

==== 2nd ODI ====
18 September
(Scorecard)

Pakistan; 222/5 (50 overs)	v	West Indies; 180 all out (46.2 overs)
Yousuf Youhana 104 (114); Mervyn Dillon 2/42 (10 overs)		Wavell Hinds 65 (115); Saqlain Mushtaq 3/18 (8 overs)

Pakistan won by 42 runs
Toronto Cricket, Skating and Curling Club, Toronto
Umpires: Steve Dunne & Daryl Harper
Player of the match: Yousuf Youhana (Pakistan)

==== 3rd ODI ====
19 September
(Scorecard)

West Indies; 161 all out (44.4 overs)	v	Pakistan; 162/3 (39.4 overs)
Jimmy Adams 27 (56); Mushtaq Ahmed 3/31 (8.4 overs)		Abdul Razzaq 57 (111); Courtney Walsh 1/24 (7 overs)

Pakistan won by 7 wickets
Toronto Cricket, Skating and Curling Club, Toronto
Umpires: Steve Dunne & Dave Orchard
Player of the match: Abdul Razzaq (Pakistan)

== Statistics ==
Most runs		Most wickets	
(Pakistan) Yousuf Youhana	137	(Pakistan) Saqlain Mushtaq	6
(Pakistan) Abdul Razzaq	113	(Pakistan) Abdul Razzaq	4
(Cricket West Indies) Sherwin Campbell	109	(Cricket West Indies) Mervyn Dillon	4
(Cricket West Indies) Wavell Hinds	108	(Pakistan) Mushtaq Ahmed	3
(Pakistan) Inzamam-ul-Haq	93	(Pakistan) Arshad Khan	3
