= Nic Pothas =

South African cricketer and coach (born 1973)

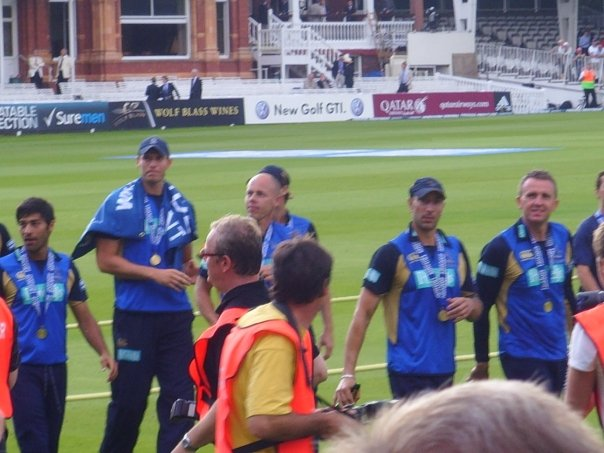
- Pothas (second from right) with Hampshire team-mates, Lord's, 2009

Personal information
- Full name: Nic Pothas
- Born: 18 November 1973 (age 52); Johannesburg, Transvaal Province, South Africa
- Nickname: Skeg
- Batting: Right-handed
- Bowling: Right-arm medium
- Role: Wicket-keeper

International information
- National side: South Africa
- ODI debut (cap 61): 23 August 2000 v Pakistan
- Last ODI: 27 August 2000 v Pakistan

Domestic team information
- Years: Team
- 1993/94–1996/97: Transvaal
- 1997/98–2001/02: Gauteng
- 2002–2011: Hampshire (squad no. 9)
- 2007/08: Delhi Giants

Career statistics
Competition	ODI	FC	LA	T20
Matches	3	218	236	79
Runs scored	24	11,438	4,567	687
Batting average	24.00	40.85	35.40	21.46
100s/50s	0/0	24/61	3/24	0/3
Top score	24	165	114*	59
Balls bowled	–	120	–	–
Wickets	–	1	–	–
Bowling average	–	63.00	–	–
5 wickets in innings	–	0	–	–
10 wickets in match	–	0	–	–
Best bowling	–	1/16	–	–
Catches/stumpings	4/1	614/45	211/53	33/14
- Source: ESPNcricinfo, 15 September 2011

Nic Pothas (born 18 November 1973) is a South African cricket coach and former cricketer who played as a right-handed batsman and fielded as a wicket-keeper. In a total of over 200 first-class matches, he has taken over 500 catches. Pothas is an accomplished batsman, with an average of over 40 in first-class cricket.

== International career ==
Pothas was representing South Africa A in Barbados when he was drafted into the South Africa squad for the 2000 Singapore Challenge as cover for Mark Boucher who had sliced his fingers open cutting biltong following South Africa's tie against Australia at the Colonial Stadium in Melbourne. With Boucher not fit for their next One Day International against Pakistan at the Kallang Ground in Singapore, Pothas made his international debut. He marked his debut by taking two catches and making a single stumping, while scoring 24 runs with the bat.

Pothas played in South Africa's next two fixtures in the Singapore tournament against New Zealand, in which he took two further catches, and in the final of the competition against Pakistan, which marked his final international appearance for South Africa. It was the presence of Boucher in the South Africa team that acted as a barrier to Pothas representing South Africa more often and indeed progressing to playing Test cricket. He also represented the Greek national team at the 2012 T-20 European Championship.

== Domestic career ==
=== Early life and career ===
Born in Johannesburg, Transvaal Province, Pothas was educated at King Edward VII School in Johannesburg. The school has a reputation for producing sportsmen of high quality. From there Pothas proceeded to Rand Afrikaans University. While undertaking his education he played cricket for Transvaal University, South African Universities and even played a single first-class match in 1995 for a combined South African Students cricket team.

He started his career at Transvaal in 1993, making his first-class debut against Northern Transvaal. In October 1993, Pothas made his debut in List A cricket against Barbados during Barbados' tour of South Africa. From his debut season to his international debut, Pothas represented Transvaal B and later as Transvaal were known, Gauteng. A regular in the first-class and List A arenas while in South Africa, he was a consistent wicket-keeper batsman, averaging on average in the mid thirties with the bat and keeping tidily behind the stumps.

Following his representation of South Africa at international level in 2000, Pothas acquired a Greek passport owing to his Greek heritage. This meant Pothas played for Gauteng as their overseas player. Seeking to play county cricket, Pothas was sought after by at least four English counties, but eventually signed for Hampshire in 2002 under recommendation from then Hampshire coach and fellow South African Jimmy Cook as a Kolpak Player.

=== County cricket ===
Making his first-class debut for the county in the 2002 County Championship against Kent, Pothas followed his up by making his List A debut in the same season against Kent in the 2002 Benson and Hedges Cup and the following season he played in Hampshire's first ever Twenty20 match against Sussex. A regular in all formats for Hampshire, he has played to date 124 first-class matches for the county, scoring over 7,000 runs and taking 355 catches behind the stumps, making him one of Hampshire's most successful wicket-keeper batsman. Up to the 2010 County Championship, Pothas had scored over 800 first-class runs in every season with Hampshire, besides the 2002 and 2007 seasons. Injury put paid to him recording over 800 first-class runs in the 2010 County Championship. Since making his debut for Hampshire, he has been at the forefront of one of the county's most successful periods, winning the 2005 Cheltenham & Gloucester Trophy and 2009 Friends Provident Trophy, in the final at Lords he made 35 runs from only 31 balls, including a huge six in to the Tavern Stand, in a winning partnership worth 67 runs with Chris Benham, who hit the winning runs.

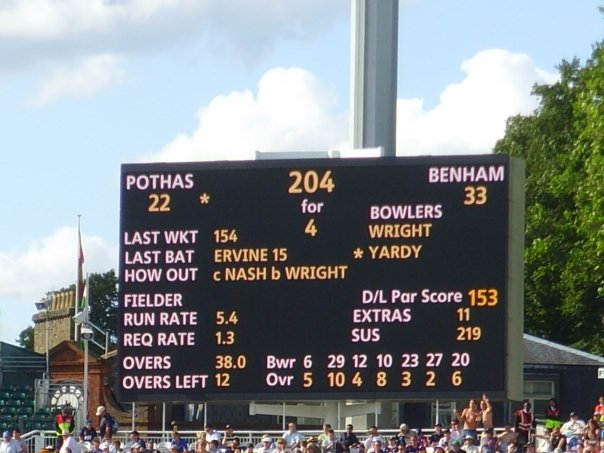
Pothas and Chris Benham build their winning partnership in the 2009 Friends Provident Trophy final

In the field Pothas caught his opposing wicket-keeper Matt Prior for a duck, and caught Pakistani international Yasir Arafat behind for 9. He was also a runner-up for the Hampshire in the 2005 County Championship and the 2007 Friends Provident Trophy. It was in 2007 that Pothas became eligible to be selected for England, four years after receiving his Hampshire cap.

In the English off-season, Pothas signed on with the Indian Cricket League and featured in the Delhi Giants team in 2008.

During his near decade with Hampshire, Pothas has stood in as county captain when captains such as Shane Warne, Shaun Udal and Dimitri Mascarenhas were unavailable. However, with then incumbent captain Dimitri Mascarenhas injured for the 2010 season following an injury picked up in the Indian Premier League, Pothas was selected to captain the team on a more long term season basis. Mid-season, he developed a cartilage defect in his right knee which ruled him out of the remainder of the season. He was replaced as captain by Dominic Cork and as wicket-keeper by Michael Bates. He added more honours during this season by being a member of Hampshire's 2010 Friends Provident t20 winning squad, having captained and played in the group stages of the competition.

In 2011, Pothas was awarded a benefit year by Hampshire, which involved a number of events and was organised by former Hampshire teammate Shaun Udal. Pothas endured an injury hit 2011 season, with Hampshire taking the decision to release him at the end of that season.

=== Greece career ===
Pothas, who is of Greek descent, was contacted on the social networking site Facebook by the Hellenic Cricket Federation (HCF) who asked him if he was "Nic Pothas the Greek cricketer". Pothas and HCF began talking, with Pothas taking age-group teams from England to Corfu so Greek teams have opposition to compare themselves against. He has been coaching Greek cricketers on his regular visits to Greece, where many of his family still live. Pothas captained the Greek national side at the 2012 European T20 Championship Division Two tournament in September 2012, played in Corfu.

== Coaching career ==
In December 2012, Pothas was appointed director of cricket at the Guernsey Cricket Board, with oversight of the Guernsey cricket team. He had previously played a season for the Cenkos Centurions, a team in the island's domestic Twenty20 league. Pothas has also promoted the development of women's cricket in Guernsey, with plans for the island to host a future international tournament

In October 2015, Pothas stepped down from his role as Guernsey's director of cricket after leading Guernsey to the World Cricket League Division Six final in the final month.

In July 2016, Pothas was appointed as the fielding coach of Sri Lanka. On 27 June 2017, with the resignation of head coach Graham Ford, Sri Lanka Cricket appointed Pothas as the interim coach for Zimbabwe and Indian tours.

In November 2018 Pothas was appointed as the interim head coach of West Indies national cricket team for the tour of Bangladesh following the end of Stuart Law's stint. He served Middlesex as assistant coach from 2018 to 2021.

In April 2023, he was appointed as the assistant coach of the Bangladesh national cricket team.
