= International cricket in 2004 =

Cricket season

The 2004 international cricket season was from April to September 2004.

== Season overview ==
International tours
Start date	Home team	Away team	Results [Matches]	
Start date	Home team	Away team	Test	ODI
20 April 2004	Zimbabwe	Sri Lanka	0–2 [2]	0–5 [5]
15 May 2004	West Indies	Bangladesh	1–0 [2]	3–0 [3]
20 May 2004	England	New Zealand	3–0 [3]	—
25 May 2004	Zimbabwe	Australia	—	0–3 [3]
1 July 2004	Australia	Sri Lanka	1–0 [2]	—
22 July 2004	England	West Indies	4–0 [4]	—
4 August 2004	Sri Lanka	South Africa	1–0 [2]	5–0 [5]
1 September 2004	England	India	—	2–1 [3]
International tournaments
Dates	Tournament		Winners	
24 June 2004	(England) NatWest Series		New Zealand	
16 July 2004	(Sri Lanka) Asia Cup		Sri Lanka	
21 August 2004	(Netherlands) Videocon Cup		Australia	
4 September 2004	(England) Australia vs Pakistan ODI match		Australia	
10 September 2004	(England) ICC Champions Trophy		West Indies	

== Pre-season rankings ==
ICC Test Championship April 2004
Rank	Team	Rating
1	Australia	127
2	South Africa	112
3	England	103
4	India	102
5	New Zealand	101
6	Pakistan	99
7	Sri Lanka	94
8	West Indies	80
9	Zimbabwe	55
10	Bangladesh	1

ICC ODI Championship April 2004
Rank	Team	Rating
1	Australia	135
2	South Africa	113
3	Sri Lanka	110
4	New Zealand	109
5	England	108
6	India	107
7	Pakistan	106
8	West Indies	99
9	Zimbabwe	63
10	Kenya	28
11	Bangladesh	3

== April ==
=== Sri Lanka in Zimbabwe ===
ODI series
No.	Date	Home captain	Away captain	Venue	Result
ODI 2119	20 April	Tatenda Taibu	Marvan Atapattu	Queens Sports Club, Bulawayo	Sri Lanka by 12 runs (D/L)
ODI 2120	22 April	Tatenda Taibu	Marvan Atapattu	Queens Sports Club, Bulawayo	Sri Lanka by 9 wickets
ODI 2122	25 April	Tatenda Taibu	Marvan Atapattu	Harare Sports Club, Harare	Sri Lanka by 9 wickets
ODI 2123	27 April	Tatenda Taibu	Mahela Jayawardene	Harare Sports Club, Harare	Sri Lanka by 72 runs
ODI 2124	29 April	Tatenda Taibu	Marvan Atapattu	Harare Sports Club, Harare	Sri Lanka by 25 runs
Test series
No.	Date	Home captain	Away captain	Venue	Result
Test 1698	6–8 May	Tatenda Taibu	Marvan Atapattu	Harare Sports Club, Harare	Sri Lanka by an innings and 240 runs
Test 1699	14–17 May	Tatenda Taibu	Marvan Atapattu	Queens Sports Club, Bulawayo	Sri Lanka by an innings and 254 runs

== May ==
=== Bangladesh in the West Indies ===
ODI series
No.	Date	Home captain	Away captain	Venue	Result
ODI 2128	15 May	Ramnaresh Sarwan	Habibul Bashar	Arnos Vale Ground, Kingstown, St Vincent	West Indies by 1 wicket
ODI 2129	16 May	Ramnaresh Sarwan	Habibul Bashar	Arnos Vale Ground, Kingstown, St Vincent	West Indies by 23 runs
ODI 2130	19 May	Ramnaresh Sarwan	Habibul Bashar	National Cricket Stadium, St George's, Grenada	West Indies by 7 wickets
Test series
No.	Date	Home captain	Away captain	Venue	Result
Test 1701	28 May–1 June	Brian Lara	Habibul Bashar	Beausejour Stadium, Gros Islet, St Lucia	Match drawn
Test 1703	4–7 June	Brian Lara	Habibul Bashar	Sabina Park, Kingston, Jamaica	West Indies by an innings and 99 runs

=== New Zealand in England ===
Test series
No.	Date	Home captain	Away captain	Venue	Result
Test 1700	20–24 May	Marcus Trescothick	Stephen Fleming	Lord's, London	England by 7 wickets
Test 1702	3–7 June	Michael Vaughan	Stephen Fleming	Headingley, Leeds	England by 9 wickets
Test 1704	10–13 June	Michael Vaughan	Stephen Fleming	Trent Bridge, Nottingham	England by 4 wickets

=== Australia in Zimbabwe ===
ODI series
No.	Date	Home captain	Away captain	Venue	Result
ODI 2131	25 May	Tatenda Taibu	Ricky Ponting	Harare Sports Club, Harare	Australia by 7 wickets
ODI 2132	27 May	Tatenda Taibu	Ricky Ponting	Harare Sports Club, Harare	Australia by 139 runs
ODI 2133	29 May	Tatenda Taibu	Ricky Ponting	Harare Sports Club, Harare	Australia by 8 wickets

== June ==
=== NatWest Series ===
Team	Pld	W	L	NR	BP	Pts	NRR
New Zealand	6	3	0	3	1	25	+1.403
West Indies	6	2	2	2	2	18	−0.376
England	6	1	4	1	3	11	−0.587

No.	Date	Team 1	Captain	Team 2	Captain	Venue	Result
Group stage
ODI 2133a	24 June	England	Michael Vaughan	New Zealand	Stephen Fleming	Old Trafford, Manchester	Match abandoned
ODI 2134	26 June	New Zealand	Stephen Fleming	West Indies	Brian Lara	Edgbaston, Birmingham	No result
ODI 2135	27 June	England	Michael Vaughan	West Indies	Brian Lara	Trent Bridge, Nottingham	West Indies by 7 wickets
ODI 2136	29 June	England	Michael Vaughan	New Zealand	Stephen Fleming	Riverside Ground, Chester-le-Street	New Zealand by 7 wickets
ODI 2137	1 July	England	Michael Vaughan	West Indies	Brian Lara	Headingley, Leeds	England by 7 wickets
ODI 2138	3 July	New Zealand	Stephen Fleming	West Indies	Brian Lara	Sophia Gardens, Cardiff	New Zealand by 5 wickets
ODI 2139	4 July	England	Michael Vaughan	New Zealand	Stephen Fleming	The Royal & Sun Alliance County Ground, Bristol	New Zealand by 6 wickets
ODI 2140	6 July	England	Michael Vaughan	West Indies	Brian Lara	Lord's, London	West Indies by 7 wickets
ODI 2141	8 July	New Zealand	Stephen Fleming	West Indies	Brian Lara	The Rose Bowl, Southampton	No result
Final
ODI 2142	10 July	New Zealand	Stephen Fleming	West Indies	Brian Lara	Lord's, London	New Zealand by 107 runs

== July ==
=== Sri Lanka in Australia ===
Test series
No.	Date	Home captain	Away captain	Venue	Result
Test 1705	1–3 July	Adam Gilchrist	Marvan Atapattu	Marrara Oval, Darwin	Australia by 149 runs
Test 1706	9–13 July	Ricky Ponting	Marvan Atapattu	Bundaberg Rum Stadium, Cairns	Match drawn

=== Asia Cup ===
==== Group stage ====
Group A
Team	Pld	W	L	T	NR	BP	Pts	NRR
Pakistan	2	2	0	0	0	2	12	+2.567
Bangladesh	2	1	1	0	0	1	6	+0.400
Hong Kong	2	0	2	0	0	0	0	−2.979

Group B
Team	Pld	W	L	T	NR	BP	Pts	NRR
Sri Lanka	2	2	0	0	0	1	11	+1.280
India	2	1	1	0	0	2	7	+1.040
United Arab Emirates	2	0	2	0	0	0	0	−2.320

No.	Date	Team 1	Captain	Team 2	Captain	Venue	Result
Group stage
ODI 2143	16 July	Bangladesh	Habibul Bashar	Hong Kong	Rahul Sharma	Sinhalese Sports Club Ground, Colombo	Bangladesh by 116 runs
ODI 2144	16 July	India	Sourav Ganguly	United Arab Emirates	Khurram Khan	Rangiri Dambulla International Stadium, Dambulla	India by 116 runs
ODI 2145	17 July	Bangladesh	Habibul Bashar	Pakistan	Inzamam-ul-Haq	Sinhalese Sports Club Ground, Colombo	Pakistan by 76 runs
ODI 2146	17 July	Sri Lanka	Mahela Jayawardene	United Arab Emirates	Khurram Khan	Rangiri Dambulla International Stadium, Dambulla	Sri Lanka by 116 runs
ODI 2147	18 July	Hong Kong	Rahul Sharma	Pakistan	Inzamam-ul-Haq	Sinhalese Sports Club Ground, Colombo	Pakistan by 173 runs (D/L)
ODI 2148	18 July	Sri Lanka	Marvan Atapattu	India	Sourav Ganguly	Rangiri Dambulla International Stadium, Dambulla	Sri Lanka by 12 runs

==== Super Fours ====
Team	Pld	W	L	T	NR	BP	Pts	NRR
Sri Lanka	3	2	1	0	0	3	13	+1.144
India	3	2	1	0	0	2	12	+0.022
Pakistan	3	2	1	0	0	0	10	+0.162
Bangladesh	3	0	3	0	0	1	1	−1.190

No.	Date	Team 1	Captain	Team 2	Captain	Venue	Result
Super Fours
ODI 2149	21 July	Bangladesh	Habibul Bashar	India	Sourav Ganguly	Sinhalese Sports Club Ground, Colombo	India by 8 wickets
ODI 2150	21 July	Sri Lanka	Marvan Atapattu	Pakistan	Inzamam-ul-Haq	R. Premadasa Stadium, Colombo	Sri Lanka by 7 wickets
ODI 2151	23 July	Sri Lanka	Marvan Atapattu	Bangladesh	Habibul Bashar	R. Premadasa Stadium, Colombo	Sri Lanka by 10 wickets
ODI 2152	25 July	India	Sourav Ganguly	Pakistan	Inzamam-ul-Haq	R. Premadasa Stadium, Colombo	Pakistan by 59 runs
ODI 2153	27 July	Sri Lanka	Marvan Atapattu	India	Sourav Ganguly	R. Premadasa Stadium, Colombo	India by 4 runs
ODI 2154	29 July	Bangladesh	Habibul Bashar	Pakistan	Inzamam-ul-Haq	R. Premadasa Stadium, Colombo	Pakistan by 6 wickets

No.	Date	Team 1	Captain	Team 2	Captain	Venue	Result
Final
ODI 2155	1 August	Sri Lanka	Marvan Atapattu	India	Sourav Ganguly	R. Premadasa Stadium, Colombo	Sri Lanka by 25 runs

=== West Indies in England ===
Test series
No.	Date	Home captain	Away captain	Venue	Result
Test 1707	22–26 July	Michael Vaughan	Brian Lara	Lord's, London	England by 210 runs
Test 1708	29 July–1 August	Michael Vaughan	Brian Lara	Edgbaston, Birmingham	England by 256 runs
Test 1711	12–16 August	Michael Vaughan	Brian Lara	Old Trafford, Manchester	England by 7 wickets
Test 1712	19–21 August	Michael Vaughan	Brian Lara	The Oval, London	England by 10 wickets

== August ==
=== South Africa in Sri Lanka ===
Test series
No.	Date	Home captain	Away captain	Venue	Result
Test 1709	4–8 August	Marvan Atapattu	Graeme Smith	Galle International Stadium, Galle	Match drawn
Test 1710	11–15 August	Marvan Atapattu	Graeme Smith	Sinhalese Sports Club Ground, Colombo	Sri Lanka by 313 runs
ODI series
No.	Date	Home captain	Away captain	Venue	Result
ODI 2156	20 August	Marvan Atapattu	Graeme Smith	R. Premadasa Stadium, Colombo	Sri Lanka by 3 wickets
ODI 2158	22 August	Marvan Atapattu	Graeme Smith	R. Premadasa Stadium, Colombo	Sri Lanka by 37 runs
ODI 2160	25 August	Marvan Atapattu	Graeme Smith	Rangiri Dambulla International Stadium, Dambulla	Sri Lanka by 4 wickets
ODI 2161	28 August	Mahela Jayawardene	Graeme Smith	Rangiri Dambulla International Stadium, Dambulla	Sri Lanka by 7 wickets
ODI 2163	31 August	Mahela Jayawardene	Graeme Smith	Sinhalese Sports Club Ground, Colombo	Sri Lanka by 49 runs

=== Videocon Cup ===
Team	Pld	W	L	T	NR	NRR	Pts
Pakistan	2	1	0	0	1	+2.000	9
Australia	2	0	0	0	2	+0.000	6
India	2	0	1	0	1	−2.000	3

No.	Date	Team 1	Captain	Team 2	Captain	Venue	Result
Group stage
ODI 2157	21 August	India	Sourav Ganguly	Pakistan	Inzamam-ul-Haq	VRA Ground, Amstelveen	Pakistan by 66 runs (D/L)
ODI 2159	23 August	Australia	Ricky Ponting	India	Sourav Ganguly	VRA Ground, Amstelveen	No result
ODI 2160a	25 August	Australia	Ricky Ponting	Pakistan	Inzamam-ul-Haq	VRA Ground, Amstelveen	Match abandoned
Final
ODI 2162	28 August	Australia	Ricky Ponting	Pakistan	Inzamam-ul-Haq	VRA Ground, Amstelveen	Australia by 17 runs

== September ==
=== India in England ===
ODI series
No.	Date	Home captain	Away captain	Venue	Result
ODI 2164	1 September	Michael Vaughan	Sourav Ganguly	Trent Bridge, Nottingham	England by 7 wickets
ODI 2165	3 September	Michael Vaughan	Sourav Ganguly	The Oval, London	England by 70 runs
ODI 2167	5 September	Michael Vaughan	Sourav Ganguly	Lord's, London	India by 23 runs

=== Australia vs Pakistan in England ===
Only ODI
No.	Date	Team 1	Captain 1	Team 2	Captain 2	Venue	Result
ODI 2166	4 September	Australia	Ricky Ponting	Pakistan	Inzamam-ul-Haq	Lord's, London	Australia by 10 runs

=== ICC Champions Trophy ===
Group A
Pos	Team	Pld	W	L	T	NR	Pts	NRR
1	Australia	2	2	0	0	0	4	3.237
2	New Zealand	2	1	1	0	0	2	1.603
3	United States	2	0	2	0	0	0	−5.121

Source: ESPNCricInfo

Group B
Pos	Team	Pld	W	L	T	NR	Pts	NRR
1	West Indies	2	2	0	0	0	4	1.471
2	South Africa	2	1	1	0	0	2	1.552
3	Bangladesh	2	0	2	0	0	0	−3.111

Source: ESPNCricInfo

Group C
Pos	Team	Pld	W	L	T	NR	Pts	NRR
1	Pakistan	2	2	0	0	0	4	1.413
2	India	2	1	1	0	0	2	0.944
3	Kenya	2	0	2	0	0	0	−2.747

Source: ESPNCricInfo

Group D
Pos	Team	Pld	W	L	T	NR	Pts	NRR
1	England	2	2	0	0	0	4	2.716
2	Sri Lanka	2	1	1	0	0	2	−0.252
3	Zimbabwe	2	0	2	0	0	0	−1.885

Source: ESPNCricInfo

No.	Date	Team 1	Captain	Team 2	Captain	Venue	Result
Group stage
ODI 2168	10 September	England	Michael Vaughan	Zimbabwe	Tatenda Taibu	Edgbaston, Birmingham	England by 152 runs
ODI 2169	10 September	New Zealand	Stephen Fleming	United States	Richard Staple	The Oval, London	New Zealand by 210 runs
ODI 2170	11 September	India	Sourav Ganguly	Kenya	Steve Tikolo	The Rose Bowl, Southampton	India by 98 runs
ODI 2171	12 September	Bangladesh	Rajin Saleh	South Africa	Graeme Smith	Edgbaston, Birmingham	South Africa by 9 wickets
ODI 2172	13 September	Australia	Ricky Ponting	United States	Richard Staple	The Rose Bowl, Southampton	Australia by 9 wickets
ODI 2173	14 September	Sri Lanka	Marvan Atapattu	Zimbabwe	Tatenda Taibu	The Oval, London	Sri Lanka by 4 wickets
ODI 2174	14 September	Kenya	Steve Tikolo	Pakistan	Inzamam-ul-Haq	Edgbaston, Birmingham	Pakistan by 7 wickets
ODI 2175	15 September	Bangladesh	Rajin Saleh	West Indies	Brian Lara	The Rose Bowl, Southampton	West Indies by 138 runs
ODI 2176	16 September	Australia	Ricky Ponting	New Zealand	Stephen Fleming	The Oval, London	Australia by 7 wickets
ODI 2177	17 September	England	Michael Vaughan	Sri Lanka	Marvan Atapattu	The Rose Bowl, Southampton	England by 49 runs (D/L)
ODI 2178	18 September	South Africa	Graeme Smith	West Indies	Brian Lara	The Oval, London	West Indies by 5 wickets
ODI 2179	19 September	India	Sourav Ganguly	Pakistan	Inzamam-ul-Haq	Edgbaston, Birmingham	Pakistan by 3 wickets
Semi-finals
ODI 2180	21 September	England	Michael Vaughan	Australia	Ricky Ponting	Edgbaston, Birmingham	England by 6 wickets
ODI 2181	22 September	Pakistan	Inzamam-ul-Haq	West Indies	Brian Lara	The Rose Bowl, Southampton	West Indies by 7 wickets
Final
ODI 2182	25 September	England	Michael Vaughan	West Indies	Brian Lara	The Oval, London	West Indies by 2 wickets
