= Toronto Cricket, Skating and Curling Club Ground =

Sports ground in Toronto, Canada

- Toronto Cricket Club
- Interactive map of Toronto Cricket, Skating and Curling Club Ground

Ground information
- Location: 141 Wilson Avenue; Toronto, Ontario, Canada
- Country: Canada
- Coordinates: 43.7399°N 79.41902°W
- Establishment: 1930
- Capacity: 4,875
- Owner: Toronto Cricket, Skating and Curling Club
- Operator: Toronto Cricket, Skating and Curling Club
- Tenants: Canada cricket team
- End names
- Clubhouse End; Southern End

International information
- First ODI: 16 September 1996: India v Pakistan
- Last ODI: 9 August 2011: Canada v Afghanistan

Team information
Toronto Cricket, Skating and Curling Club	(1930 -)
Canada	(2006 -)
- As of 7 January, 2021; Source: Cricinfo

Toronto Cricket, Skating and Curling Club Ground is a cricket ground in Toronto, Ontario, Canada.

In 1827 the Toronto Cricket Club was established in part by the efforts of George Anthony Barber. Cricket was joined by the Curling Club in 1836, and the Skating club sometime in the mid-1800s. The three clubs were amalgamated in 1957. The club also provides facilities for tennis and squash, amongst other sports.

The TCSCC is clearly the major ground, having hosted the Sahara Cups in the 1990s. Until September 2006, the cricket ground was the only ground in Canada approved to host official One Day Internationals. It was joined at this date by the Maple Leaf Cricket Club. Up until that point it had hosted 31 One-day internationals, most between India and Pakistan who played 16 games against each other at the venue. Canada played their first ODI there against Kenya in August 2006.

== International record ==
=== One Day International centuries ===
Five ODI centuries have been scored at the venue.

No.	Score	Player	Team	Balls	Opposing team	Innings	Date	Result
1	109	Shahid Afridi	Pakistan	94	India	1	19 September 1998	Won
2	101	Mohammad Azharuddin	India	111	Pakistan	1	20 September 1998	Lost
3	104*	Mohammad Yousuf	Pakistan	114	West Indies	1	18 September 1999	Won
4	101	Irving Romaine	Bermuda	111	Canada	1	21 August 2006	Won
5	177	Paul Stirling	Ireland	134	Canada	1	7 September 2010	Won

=== One Day International five-wicket hauls ===
Six ODI five-wicket hauls have been taken at this venue.

#	Figures	Player	Country	Innings	Opponent	Date	Result
1	5/36	Mushtaq Ahmed	Pakistan	2	India	23 September 1996	Won
2	5/45	Saqlain Mushtaq	Pakistan	1	India	13 September 1997	Lost
3	5/16	Sourav Ganguly	India	2	Pakistan	18 September 1997	Won
4	5/51	Mervyn Dillon	West Indies	1	India	14 September 1999	Lost
5	5/21	Nikhil Chopra	India	2	West Indies	14 September 1999	Won
6	5/49	Albert van der Merwe	Ireland	2	Canada	7 September 2010	Won

== See also ==
- Maple Leaf Cricket Club
