= Sahara Cup =

- India and Pakistan
- Format: One Day International
- First edition: 1996 Canada
- Latest edition: 1998 Canada
- Number of teams: (India) (Pakistan)

The Sahara Cup was a bilateral ODI cricket series between Pakistan and India, which was held annually in Canada. It was staged from 1996 to 1998 at the Toronto Cricket, Skating and Curling Club Ground, which was selected as one of the few North American locations that was deemed adequate at the time for international cricket. The series consisted of 5 ODIs, and all the matches were played in daylight. Pakistan won the first series 3–2 in 1996. India won 4–1 in 1997. Pakistan again won 4–1 in 1998. 1998 was also the year that cricket was featured in the Kuala Lumpur Commonwealth Games, leading to a situation where India had to field two separate teams in order to take part in the two competitions. A total of 15 matches were played over a span of 3 years. Pakistan have been more successful amongst the two, with a total of 8 victories. India have 7 victories.

The series was a five-year agreement by both the PCB and the BCCI, with the International Management Group (IMG). Trans World International (TWI) and ESPN had telecast rights. The series had gained good popularity in the cricketing arena, just like the Sharjah cup - where two arch-rivals met at a neutral venue. However, the series was later called off after Sahara India - the sponsors - pulled out in the wake of the Pakistani intrusion in Kashmir in 1999. Prior to the cancellation, an unsuccessful attempt was made to create a series with the West Indies as the third team, which would have allowed a three-way competition where India and Pakistan would not directly compete with each other. The diplomatic relations between the two countries considerably worsened during the Kargil war in 1999, and further, India suspended all cricketing ties with Pakistan from 2000 until 2004.

Following, is the summary of the match results.

Season 1 (1996)

- Match 1 – Sep 16, 1996 – India, 8 wickets
- Match 2 – Sep 17, 1996 – Pakistan, 2 wickets
- Match 3 – Sep 18, 1996 – India, 55 runs
- Match 4 – Sep 21, 1996 – Pakistan, 97 runs
- Match 5 – Sep 23, 1996 – Pakistan, 52 runs

Season 2 (1997)

- Match 1 – Sep 13, 1997 – India, 20 runs
- Match 2 – Sep 14, 1997 – India, 7 wickets
- Match 3 – Sep 17, 1997 – no result (Washed out due to rain)
- Match 3 – Sep 18, 1997 – India, 34 runs
- Match 4 – Sep 20, 1997 – India, 7 wickets
- Match 5 – Sep 21, 1997 – Pakistan, 5 wickets

Season 3 (1998)

- Match 1 – 12 Sep, 1998 - Ind, 6 wickets
- Match 2 – 13 Sep, 1998 - Pak, 51 runs
- Match 3 – 16 Sep, 1998 - Pak, 77 runs
- Match 4 – 19 Sep, 1998 - Pak, 134 runs
- Match 5 – 20 Sep, 1998 - Pak, 5 Wickets
