= 1999 DMC Cup =

- Date: 11–14 September 1999
- Location: Canada
- Result: India won the 3-match series 2-1
- Player of the series: Sourav Ganguly
Teams
- West Indies: India
Captains
- Brian Lara: Sourav Ganguly
Most runs
- Sherwin Campbell (121): Rahul Dravid (98)
Most wickets
- Mervyn Dillon (7): Nikhil Chopra (8)

The DMC Cup was a three match One Day International cricket series which took place between 11 and 14 September 1999. The tournament was held in Canada, and involved India and the West Indies. The tournament was won by India, who won the series 2–1. The West Indies then went on to compete in the 1999 DCM Trophy days later against Pakistan. The tournament was a makeshift arrangement to fill in for the Sahara Cup 1999 which did not take place as India refused to play Pakistan due to political reasons.

== Teams ==
- India
- West Indies

== Squads ==
India	West Indies
Sourav Ganguly (C); Nikhil Chopra; Rahul Dravid; Sunil Joshi; Vinod Kambli; Hrishikesh Kanitkar; Jacob Martin; Debasis Mohanty; Venkatesh Prasad; Mannava Prasad (Wk); Sadagoppan Ramesh; Robin Singh	Brian Lara (C); Jimmy Adams; Hendy Bryan; Sherwin Campbell; Shivnarine Chanderpaul; Corey Collymore; Mervyn Dillon; Chris Gayle; Adrian Griffith; Wavell Hinds; Ridley Jacobs (Wk); Reon King; Ricardo Powell; Courtney Walsh

== Fixtures ==
=== ODI series ===
==== 1st ODI ====
11 September
(Scorecard)

West Indies; 163 all out (46.2 overs)	v	India; 165/2 (37.3 overs)
Sherwin Campbell 62 (95); Robin Singh 3/43 (10 overs)		Sadagoppan Ramesh 55* (97); Courtney Walsh 1/20 (7 overs)

India won by 8 wickets
Toronto Cricket, Skating and Curling Club, Toronto
Umpires: Daryl Harper & Dave Orchard
Player of the match: Sourav Ganguly (India)

==== 2nd ODI ====
12 September
(Scorecard)

West Indies; 190/6 (50 overs)	v	India; 120 all out (41.5 overs)
Sherwin Campbell 59 (85); Sourav Ganguly 3/37 (9 overs)		Sunil Joshi 25 (35); Mervyn Dillon 2/8 (8 overs)

West Indies won by 70 runs
Toronto Cricket, Skating and Curling Club, Toronto
Umpires: Steve Dunne & Daryl Harper
Player of the match: Sherwin Campbell (West Indies)

==== 3rd ODI ====
14 September
(Scorecard)

India; 225/7 (50 overs)	v	West Indies; 137 all out (34.2 overs)
Rahul Dravid 77 (87); Mervyn Dillon 5/51 (10 overs)		Ricardo Powell 76 (73); Nikhil Chopra 5/21 (6.2 overs)

India won by 88 runs
Toronto Cricket, Skating and Curling Club, Toronto
Umpires: Steve Dunne & Dave Orchard
Player of the match: Rahul Dravid (India)

== Statistics ==
Most runs		Most wickets	
(Cricket West Indies) Sherwin Campbell	121	(India) Nikhil Chopra	8
(Cricket West Indies) Ricardo Powell	119	(Cricket West Indies) Mervyn Dillon	7
(India) Rahul Dravid	98	(India) Debasis Mohanty	5
(India) Sourav Ganguly	89	(India) Robin Singh	4
(Cricket West Indies) Brian Lara	62	(India) Sourav Ganguly	3
