= Indian cricket team in New Zealand in 1993–94 =

International cricket tour

	India	New Zealand
- Dates: 10 March – 2 April 1994
Captains	Mohammad Azharuddin	Ken Rutherford

Test series
- Result: 1-match series drawn 0–0
Most runs	Navjot Sidhu (108)	Stephen Fleming (108)
Most wickets	Javagal Srinath (5); Rajesh Chauhan (5)	Danny Morrison (4)

One Day International series
- Results: 4-match series drawn 2–2
Most runs	Ajay Jadeja (201)	Shane Thomson (184)
Most wickets	Anil Kumble (9)	Danny Morrison (6)
- Player of the series: Shane Thomson (NZ)

The India national cricket team toured New Zealand from 10 March to 2 April 1994, playing only one Test match, which was drawn. In addition to it, the team played two first-class games and four ODIs. India's 24-day tour began with two first-class fixtures, against New Zealand Emerging Players XI and New Zealand Academy, both of which ended in draws. The one-off Test and the ODI series that followed also ended in draws, the latter seeing India win two matches and New Zealand two.

== Background ==
The India squad for the tour left for New Zealand on 6 March 1994. The touring party also included manager Ajit Wadekar and administrative manager Ranga Reddy. A day prior to departure, the team had played a charity game against World XI in New Delhi. Having last played in New Zealand four years before, the tour was the first for spinners Anil Kumble and Rajesh Chauhan, wicket-keeper Nayan Mongia, and medium-pacer Salil Ankola. Since the series defeat in that tour, the team had won Test series in different tours both home and away. Under the captaincy of Mohammad Azharuddin, the side also had a particularly successful previous season.

However, New Zealand entered the Test on the back of a series defeat at home against Pakistan, despite winning the final Test. They had also won the final ODI and tying another in the ODI series that followed. It was reported that Richard Hadlee who had retired from professional cricket and serving as a commentator during the time was asked by Pakistan former cricketer Imran Khan to come out of retirement to play the India series.

== Squads ==
India	New Zealand
Mohammad Azharuddin (c); Sachin Tendulkar (vc); Kapil Dev; ~~Manoj Prabhakar~~; Navjot Singh Sidhu; Sanjay Manjrekar; Pravin Amre; Vinod Kambli; Nayan Mongia (wk); Javagal Srinath; Rajesh Chauhan; Venkatapathy Raju; Salil Ankola; Ajay Jadeja; Venkatesh Prasad	Ken Rutherford (c); Bryan Young; Blair Hartland; Mark Greatbatch; Stephen Fleming; Shane Thomson; Adam Parore (wk); Matthew Hart; Dion Nash; Simon Doull; Danny Morrison; Chris Pringle

A 14-member India squad for the tour was announced in early March 1994. Venkatesh Prasad was called up to replace Manoj Prabhakar, who fractured his heel, a few days prior to start of the Test. New Zealand announced its squad for the Test on 13 March. Changes from the side that lost a Test series to Pakistan a few weeks prior, included wicket-keeper Tony Blain who was replaced by Adam Parore, Chris Cairns by Dion Nash and Andrew Jones who retired from Tests, making way for Stephen Fleming, then a Canterbury player, who was the only new addition to the squad.

== Tour matches ==
=== Three-day: New Zealand Emerging Players XI v Indians ===
10–12 March 1994
Scorecard

New Zealand Emerging Players XI	v	Indians
233/4d (109 overs); Blair Hartland 98 (220); Javagal Srinath 2/42 (23 overs)		352 (108.3 overs); Manoj Prabhakar 147 (258); Grant Bradburn 4/99 (26 overs)
236/2 (97 overs); Mark Douglas 64*; Salil Ankola 1/42 (12 overs)

Match drawn
Carisbrook Oval, Dunedin
Umpires: Nook Ebert and Christopher King

- New Zealand Emerging Players XI won the toss and elected to bat.

India fielded a team without vice-captain Sachin Tendulkar for the match, who was ruled out after he had a boil on his left hand punctured. The New Zealand Emerging Players XI included players who were on the edge of selection for the Test side, except for Blair Hartland who already played for the latter team as an opener. He top-scored for the Emerging Players XI with 98 off 200 balls after his team winning the toss elected to bat; he batted for four-and-a-half hours. Javagal Srinath picked up two wickets despite the pitch not offering much for seamers. Kapil Dev, who had a stiff neck, was not used. The batting side went to stumps at 233/4. In reply, the Indians made 352 with Manoj Prabhakar making 147 off 258 deliveries and Sanjay Manjrekar, 134 off 237, while the others made negligible contributions. The Emerging Players XI had Michael Owens and MF Sharpe bowling well with the second new ball, while others bowled ordinarily, except for Grant Bradburn, who combined with Owens to dismiss the Indians' lower order. Day 3, the final day, ended with the New Zealand Emerging Players XI having made 236/2, in their second innings.

=== Three-day: New Zealand Academy v Indians ===
14–16 March 1994
Scorecard

New Zealand Academy	v	Indians
253/5d (111 overs); Blair Pocock 139* (320); Rajesh Chauhan 2/37 (14 overs)		96/1 (27.3 overs); Ajay Jadeja 55* (89); Matthew Goodson 1/20 (4 overs)

Match drawn
Pukekura Park, New Plymouth
Umpires: Billy Bowden and Evan Watkin

- Indians won the toss and elected to field.
- The start of day 1 was delayed due to rain.
- No play was possible on day 3 due to rain.
- Stumps were drawn 30 minutes before scheduled time on day 1 due to bad light.

Sachin Tendulkar, who led the Indians while Mohammad Azharuddin rested, won the toss and put the New Zealand Academy to bat under overcast conditions and moisty pitch. Javagal Srinath of the Indians troubled the New Zealand Academy openers early on with movement off the seam. After having been turned down for lbw, the academy went to lunch at 46/0 before losing two wickets at tea. Opener Blair Pocock however carried on and reached his fourth first-class century at stumps taking his team's total to 171/4. His team declared at lunch with the score at 253/5 with Pocock himself remaining unbeaten at 139. The Indians were 96/1 at stumps with opener Ajay Jadeja unbeaten at 55, characterized by attacking strokeplay, at the crease. The match ended in a draw after no play was possible on the third and final day due to rain.

== Only Test ==
19–23 March 1994
Scorecard

New Zealand	v	India
187 (97.2 overs); Ken Rutherford 63 (179); Javagal Srinath 4/60 (31 overs)		246 (102.3 overs); Mohammad Azharuddin 63 (147); Danny Morrison 4/52 (30 overs)
368/7d (129 overs); Stephen Fleming 92 (177); Rajesh Chauhan 3/97 (29 overs)		177/3 (59 overs); Navjot Sidhu 98 (177); Matthew Hart 2/66 (15 overs)

Match drawn
Trust Bank Park, Hamilton
Umpires: Brian Aldridge (NZ) and Khizer Hayat (Pak)
Player of the match: Stephen Fleming (NZ)

- New Zealand won the toss and decided to bat.
- Stephen Fleming (NZ) made his Test debut.
- Ken Rutherford (NZ) and Sachin Tendulkar (Ind) passed 2,000 runs, and Mohammad Azharuddin (Ind) passed 4,000 runs in Tests.
- Kapil Dev (Ind) played his final Test.

== ODI series ==
=== First ODI ===
25 March 1994
Scorecard

New Zealand; 240/5 (50 overs)	v	India; 212/9 (50 overs)
Stephen Fleming 90 (107); Javagal Srinath 2/59 (10 overs)		Ajay Jadeja 59 (93); Danny Morrison 3/35 (9 overs)

New Zealand won by 28 runs
McLean Park, Napier
Umpires: Steve Dunne (NZ) and Dave Quested (NZ)
Player of the match: Shane Thomson (NZ)

- India won the toss and elected to field.
- Stephen Fleming (NZ) made his ODI debut.

=== Second ODI ===
27 March 1994
Scorecard

New Zealand; 142 (49.4 overs)	v	India; 143/3 (23.2 overs)
Chris Harris 50* (71); Rajesh Chauhan 3/43 (10 overs)		Sachin Tendulkar 82 (49); Chris Harris 1/13 (4 overs)

India won by 7 wickets
Eden Park, Auckland
Umpires: Brian Aldridge (NZ) and Christopher King
Player of the match: Sachin Tendulkar (Ind)

- New Zealand won the toss and elected to bat.

=== Third ODI ===
30 March 1994
Scorecard

India; 255/5 (50 overs)	v	New Zealand; 243/9 (50 overs)
Navjot Sidhu 71 (77); Danny Morrison 2/57 (10 overs)		Shane Thomson 60 (61); Anil Kumble 5/33 (10 overs)

India won by 12 runs
Basin Reserve, Wellington
Umpires: Steve Dunne (NZ) and Christopher King
Player of the match: Anil Kumble (Ind)

- New Zealand won the toss and elected to field.
- Mohammad Azharuddin became the first Indian to pass 4,500 runs in ODIs.

=== Fourth ODI ===
2 April 1994
Scorecard

India; 222/6 (50 overs)	v	New Zealand; 223/4 (49.5 overs)
Ajay Jadeja 68 (132); Chris Harris 1/25 (10 overs)		Ken Rutherford 61 (90); Anil Kumble 3/47 (10 overs)

New Zealand won by 6 wickets
Lancaster Park, Christchurch
Umpires: Brian Aldridge (NZ) and Doug Cowie (NZ)
Player of the match: Adam Parore (NZ)

- India won the toss and elected to bat.
- Venkatesh Prasad (Ind) made his ODI debut.
