= 1996 'Friendship' Cup =

International cricket tournament

1996 Friendship Cup
- Dates: 14 – 23 September 1996
- Administrator: International Cricket Council
- Cricket format: One Day International
- Host: Canada
- Champions: Pakistan
- Participants: 2
- Matches: 5
- Player of the series: (India) Anil Kumble
- Most runs: (India) Rahul Dravid (220)
- Most wickets: (India) Anil Kumble (13)

The 1996 'Friendship Cup' , also known as the 1996 Sahara 'Friendship Cup' for sponsorship reasons, was a One Day International cricket series which took place between 14 and 23 September 1996. The tournament was held in Canada, which was seen as perfect neutral territory for India and Pakistan to play each other. The tournament was won by Pakistan, who won the series 3–2. This was the first edition of the annual event.

== Squads ==
| India | Pakistan |
|---|---|
| Sachin Tendulkar (C); Mohammad Azharuddin; Anil Kumble; Rahul Dravid; Sourav Ganguly; Aashish Kapoor; Ajay Jadeja; Vinod Kambli; Nayan Mongia (Wk); Sunil Joshi; Javagal Srinath; Venkatesh Prasad | Wasim Akram (C); Aamer Sohail; Azhar Mahmood; Ijaz Ahmed; Inzamam-ul-Haq; Mushtaq Ahmed; Moin Khan (Wk); Saeed Anwar; Saleem Elahi; Saleem Malik; Saqlain Mushtaq; Shadab Kabir; Waqar Younis |

== Match results ==
=== 1st ODI ===
16 September
Scorecard

| Pakistan; 170/9 (33 overs) | v | India; 173/2 (29.5 overs) |
| Saeed Anwar 46 (34); Javagal Srinath 3/23 (7 overs) | | Sachin Tendulkar 89* (89); Saleem Malik 1/21 (4 overs) |

India won by 8 wickets
Toronto Cricket, Skating and Curling Club, Toronto
Umpires: Lloyd Barker (WI) and David Shepherd (Eng)
Player of the match: Sachin Tendulkar (Ind)

- India won the toss and elected to field.
- Match reduced to 33 overs per side due to rain.
- Match was scheduled to be played on 14 September. It was shifted to 16 September due to rain.
- Azhar Mahmood (Pak) made his ODI debut.

=== 2nd ODI ===
17 September
Scorecard

| India; 264/6 (50 overs) | v | Pakistan; 266/8 (49.5 overs) |
| Rahul Dravid 90 (114); Saqlain Mushtaq 2/39 (10 overs) | | Saeed Anwar 80 (78); Javagal Srinath 2/53 (10 overs) |

Pakistan won by 2 wickets
Toronto Cricket, Skating and Curling Club, Toronto
Umpires: Lloyd Barker (WI) and Dave Orchard (SA)
Player of the match: Saleem Malik (Pak)

- Pakistan won the toss and elected to field.
- Match was scheduled to be played on 15 September. It was shifted to 17 September due to rain.
- Mohammad Azharuddin (Ind) passed 6,000 runs in ODIs.
- Mohammad Azharuddin and Rahul Dravid set a record for the highest third wicket partnership for India (161 runs).

=== 3rd ODI ===
18 September
(Scorecard)

| India; 191 (50 overs) | v | Pakistan; 136 (42.4 overs) |
| Rahul Dravid 46 (93); Wasim Akram 4/35 (9 overs) | | Moin Khan 42 (67); Anil Kumble 4/12 (7 overs) |

India won by 55 runs
Toronto Cricket, Skating and Curling Club, Toronto
Umpires: David Shepherd (Eng) and Dave Orchard (SA)
Player of the match: Rahul Dravid (Ind)

- India won the toss and elected to bat.
- Nayan Mongia (Ind) equalled the record of five dismissals in an ODI and became the only wicket-keeper to have done it twice.

=== 4th ODI ===
21 September
Scorecard

| Pakistan; 258/8 (50 overs) | v | India; 161 (39.2 overs) |
| Ijaz Ahmed 90 (110); Anil Kumble 2/36 (10 overs) | | Ajay Jadeja 47 (84); Saqlain Mushtaq 3/9 (7 overs) |

Pakistan won by 97 runs
Toronto Cricket, Skating and Curling Club, Toronto
Umpires: Lloyd Barker (WI) and David Shepherd (Eng)
Player of the match: Ijaz Ahmed (Pak)

- India won the toss and elected to field.

=== 5th ODI ===
23 September
Scorecard

| Pakistan; 213/9 (50 overs) | v | India; 161 (45.5 overs) |
| Aamer Sohail 44 (96); Anil Kumble 3/47 (10 overs) | | Sachin Tendulkar 23 (44); Mushtaq Ahmed 5/36 (10 overs) |

Pakistan won by 52 runs
Toronto Cricket, Skating and Curling Club, Toronto
Umpires: Lloyd Barker (WI) and Dave Orchard (SA)
Player of the match: Mushtaq Ahmed (Pak)

- Pakistan won the toss and elected to bat.
- The match was rescheduled from 22 September due to rain.
- Saleem Malik (Pak) passed 6,000 runs in ODIs.

== Records ==
- Dravid and Mohammad Azharuddin put on a partnership of 161 runs in the second ODI- highest third wicket partnership for India in ODIs eclipsing the previous best of 158 runs put up by Navjot Singh Sidhu and Mohinder Amarnath against New Zealand.
- Azhar and Saleem Malik crossed 6000 runs in ODIs during the series.
