= Nélson Bertolazzi =

Brazilian footballer (born 1966)

Personal information
- Full name: Nélson Antônio Bertolazzi
- Date of birth: 12 June 1966 (age 60)
- Place of birth: Brazil
- Position: Striker

Senior career*
Years	Team	Apps	(Gls)
1985–1986	Botafogo-SP		
1986	Boavista	14	(3)
1987	Guarani		
1988	XV de Piracicaba		
1988–1989	Boavista	32	(13)
1989–1990	Internacional		
1990–1991	Boavista	33	(7)
1992	Botafogo-SP		
1992–1994	Boavista	35	(6)
1994–1995	União de Leiria	34	(13)
1995–1996	Boavista	20	(4)
1996	Rio Branco		
1996	Portuguesa		
1997	Inter de Limeira		
1997	Red Bull Bragantino		
1998	América-SP		
1999	Paysandu		
2000	Anápolis		
- * Club domestic league appearances and goals

Nélson Antônio Bertolazzi (born 12 June 1966) is a Brazilian former footballer who played as a striker.

== Early life ==
Bertolazzi is the brother of Brazil international Paulo Egídio.

== Career ==
Bertolazzi played for Portuguese side Boavista, helping the club win the 1992 Supertaça Cândido de Oliveira.

== Style of play ==
Bertolazzi mainly operated as a striker and was described as "despite being a striker, Nelson Bertollazzi was never a man for astronomical amounts of goals. Often moved to an attacking lane, due to his characteristics as a mobile player, the Brazilian was not a goalscoring machine".

== Personal life ==
After retiring from professional football, Bertolazzi worked at a gas station.
