= Abel Shongwe =

Swazi footballer

Personal information
- Full name: Abel Jabulani Shongwe
- Date of birth: 26 June 1966 (age 60)
- Place of birth: Mbabane, Swaziland
- Position: Midfielder

Senior career*
Years	Team	Apps	(Gls)
1984–1986	Mbabane Highlanders		
1986–1988	Kaizer Chiefs	68	(21)
1988–1990	Wits University F.C.	55	(14)
1990–1991	Dynamos	34	(9)
1991–1992	Moroka Swallows	54	(11)
1993–?	Pretoria City F.C.		
- AmaZulu F.C.
?–1999	Lamontville Golden Arrows		
Total		211+	(55+)

International career
- Swaziland
- * Club domestic league appearances and goals

Abel Shongwe (born 26 June 1966) is a retired Swazi football midfielder.

== Kaizer Chiefs ==
He was invited for trials by Ted Dumitru after his performance in a 3–2 win in a friendly against Orlando Pirates. He went AWOL so he could attend trials. He scored his first goal against Hellenic at Ellis Park Stadium. He requested a transfer to another team when he started fall behind to Mike Mangena, Nelson Dladla, Marks Maponyane and Shane McGregor.

== Later career ==
A Swazi international, he joined Wits in 1988, Dynamos until they closed shop in 1991 and then Moroka Swallows in 1993 and left because of financial problems.

== After retirement ==
He has coached a number of SAFA Second Division teams. He completed a course for his CAF B coaching license.
