= Laurent Cadu =

French footballer (born 1966)

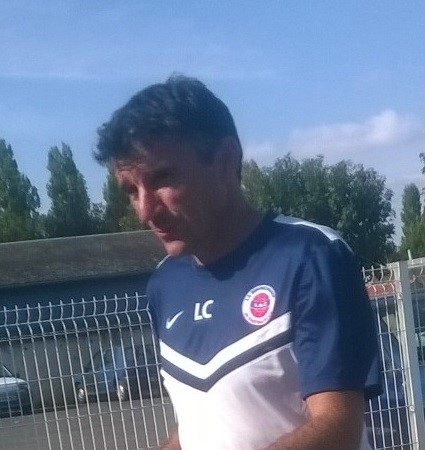
- Laurent Cadu in 2014

Personal information
- Full name: Laurent Cadu
- Date of birth: 22 August 1966 (age 60)
- Place of birth: Bressuire, France
- Height: 1.74 m (5 ft 8 1/2 in)
- Position: Defender

Senior career*
Years	Team	Apps	(Gls)
1985–1991	Chamois Niortais	44	(0)
1991–2000	Thouars	257	(11)
Total		301	(11)
- * Club domestic league appearances and goals

Laurent Cadu (born 22 August 1966) is a former professional footballer. He played as a defender and is currently the scout of La Berrichonne de Châteauroux.
