= Anzor Koblev =

Russian footballer and coach

Personal information
- Full name: Anzor Zaurovich Koblev
- Date of birth: 2 August 1966 (age 60)
- Height: 1.74 m (5 ft 8 1/2 in)
- Position: Defender

Senior career*
Years	Team	Apps	(Gls)
1982–1990	FC Druzhba Maykop	212	(12)
1991	FC Dinamo Sukhumi	42	(5)
1991–1993	FC Druzhba Maykop	114	(8)
1994	FC Chernomorets Novorossiysk	31	(4)
1995	FC Puteyets Belorechensk		
1996–1997	FC Gazovik-Gazprom Izhevsk	47	(4)
1998	FC KUZBASS Kemerovo	13	(2)

Managerial career
- 2002: FC Spartak Anapa
- 2004: FC Avangard Lazarevskoye
- 2009: FC Granit Maykop
- 2011–2012: FC Druzhba Maykop
- * Club domestic league appearances and goals

Anzor Zaurovich Koblev (Russian: Анзор Заурович Коблев; born 2 August 1966) is a Russian professional football coach and a former player.

== Club career ==
He made his Russian Football National League debut for FC Druzhba Maykop on 25 April 1992 in a game against FC Uralan Elista. He played 5 seasons in the FNL for Druzhba, FC Chernomorets Novorossiysk and FC Gazovik-Gazprom Izhevsk.
