= Mushtaq Ahmed (cricketer) =

Pakistani cricketer (born 1970)

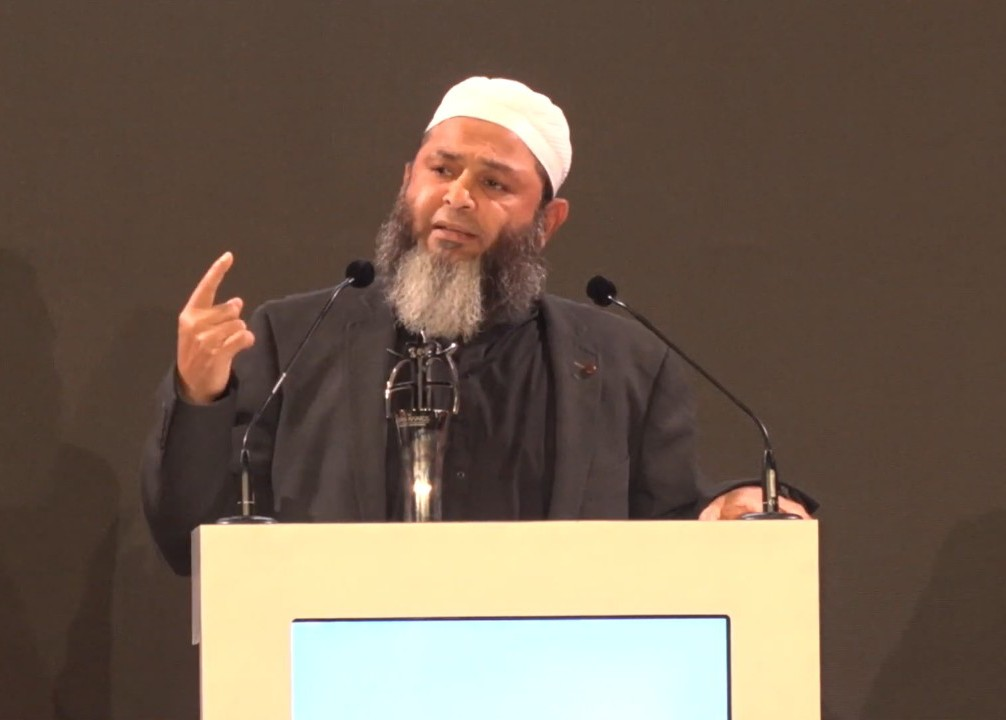
- Mushtaq Ahmed in 9th The Asian Awards, 2019

Personal information
- Born: 28 June 1970 (age 56); Sahiwal, Punjab, Pakistan
- Height: 5 ft 4 in (163 cm)
- Batting: Right-handed
- Bowling: Right-arm leg break
- Role: Bowler

International information
- National side: Pakistan (1989–2003)
- Test debut (cap 116): 19 January 1990 v Australia
- Last Test: 24 October 2003 v South Africa
- ODI debut (cap 69): 23 March 1989 v Sri Lanka
- Last ODI: 3 October 2003 v South Africa

Career statistics
Competition	Test	ODI	FC	LA
Matches	52	144	309	381
Runs scored	656	399	5,124	1,624
Batting average	11.71	9.50	15.43	11.27
100s/50s	0/2	0/0	0/20	0/0
Top score	59	34*	90*	41
Balls bowled	12,532	7,543	70,759	18,973
Wickets	185	161	1,407	461
Bowling average	32.97	33.29	25.67	28.59
5 wickets in innings	10	1	104	4
10 wickets in match	3	0	32	0
Best bowling	7/56	5/36	9/48	7/24
Catches/stumpings	23/–	30/–	118/–	59/–
Medal record
Men's Cricket
Representing Pakistan
ICC Cricket World Cup
Winner	1992 Australia and New Zealand
Runner-up	1999 England-Wales -Ireland-Scotland-Netherlands
- Source: ESPNcricinfo, 15 November 2012

Mushtaq Ahmed (Urdu:مشتاق احمد; born 28 June 1970) is a Pakistani cricket coach and former cricketer who currently acts as the spin bowling coach for the Bangladesh national cricket team. A leg break googly bowler, at his peak he was described as one of the best three wrist-spinners in the world. In an international career that spanned from 1990 until 2003, he claimed 185 wickets in Test cricket and 161 in One Day Internationals. He was at his most prolific internationally between 1995 and 1998, but his most successful years were as a domestic player for Sussex in the early 2000s.

Mushtaq was part of the Pakistan team that won the 1992 Cricket World Cup, and five years later, he was named as one of the Wisden Cricketers of the Year. During his time with Sussex, he was the leading wicket-taker in the County Championship for five successive seasons, and helped the county win the competition in 2003, 2006, and 2007.

== Cricket career ==
=== Early career ===
Mushtaq Ahmed made his first-class cricket debut in January 1987, at the age of 16. Playing for Multan, he claimed four wickets in the second innings of the match against Sukkur. He claimed his maiden recorded five-wicket haul in the format the following season, playing for the Punjab Chief Minister's XI against the touring England cricket team. Shortly thereafter, he competed in the 1988 Under-19 World Cup, where he was the joint leading wicket-taker, claiming 19 wickets at an average of 16.21. Pakistan reached the final of the tournament, in which they lost to Australia by five wickets. Early the following season, Mushtaq took the first ten-wicket haul of his career, collecting six wickets in the first innings and eight in the second innings of a match against Peshawar. He continued to impress that season, and took 52 wickets at an average of 22.84. He continued to appear for Pakistan Under-19s, and took 26 wickets in their series against India under-19s, more than double any other Pakistani player. His strong performances resulted in a call-up to the Pakistan national cricket team in March 1989.

=== International bowler ===
He made his full international debut on 23 March 1989, playing a One Day International (ODI) against Sri Lanka. He took two wickets for 33 runs in the match, which Pakistan won by 30 runs. He retained his place in the Pakistan side for the subsequent tri-series with India and the West Indies, and made his Test cricket debut in January 1990 against Australia at the Adelaide Oval. His only wicket of the match was that of Mark Taylor. A year later, took fourteen wickets in a match against Peshawar, collecting five in the first innings, followed by nine in the second, finishing the match with figures of 14 for 130.

In 1992, Mushtaq was part of the Pakistan team which won the Cricket World Cup. He was joint-second amongst bowlers by wickets taken, having claimed 16 during the tournament, trailing only his compatriot Wasim Akram. He struggled to make a significant impact in Test cricket for a number of years after his debut: between 1990 and 1994, he only claimed ten or more wickets in a Test series on one occasion, against England in 1992. However, between November 1995 and March 1998, he took at least ten wickets in every Test series, and claimed ten five-wicket hauls. The first occasion on which he claimed five wickets in an innings in Test cricket was the second Test against Australia in November 1995. He repeated the feat in the third Test of that series, and then in the only Test of the subsequent series against New Zealand, in which he recorded his best figures in a Test match, seven for 56. His only five-wicket haul in ODI cricket occurred in the fifth ODI of the Sahara 'Friendship' Cup, a series played between India and Pakistan in Toronto, Canada. He took five wickets for 36 runs to help Pakistan win the match by 52 runs, and thus clinch the series 3–2.

During his most prolific years of Test cricket, he played his first spell of county cricket, appearing for Somerset between 1993 and 1998. In his book Somerset County Cricket Club (100 Greats), Eddie Lawrence describes Mushtaq as "one of Somerset's best-ever "overseas" signings." He played 62 first-class matches for the county, and claimed 289 wickets at an average of 26.32. In 1997, he was named as one of the five Wisden Cricketers of the Year, in which he was described as being a member of "a glittering triumvirate of wrist-spinners who adorn the modern game."

In the late 1990s, Mushtaq was one of a number of Pakistan cricketers who were suspected of match-fixing. Saleem Pervez alleged that he had given Mushtaq, along with Salim Malik, £100,000 to intentionally lose a match against Australia in September 1994. After an inquiry, Mushtaq was fined £3,500, and banned from captaining Pakistan. The judge presiding over the inquiry stated that: "There are sufficient grounds to cast strong doubt on Mushtaq Ahmed."

=== Later career ===
After losing his place in the Pakistan national cricket team, Mushtaq played one season of county cricket for Surrey in 2002, having appeared in the Liverpool and District Cricket Competition for Northop Hall the previous year. He failed to impress for Surrey, claiming eight wickets at an average of 38.12. The following season, he joined Sussex, where he became the leading county wicket taker for five seasons in a row, playing a major role in Sussex's first ever County Championship title.

His form for the county prompted a recall to international duty, but it was short-lived: he played two Tests and one ODI before being dropped for the final time. He helped Sussex to win the County Championship twice more before persistent knee injuries forced him to retire at the end of the 2008 season. In 85 matches with Sussex, Mushtaq claimed 478 wickets at an average of 25.34.

== Coaching career ==
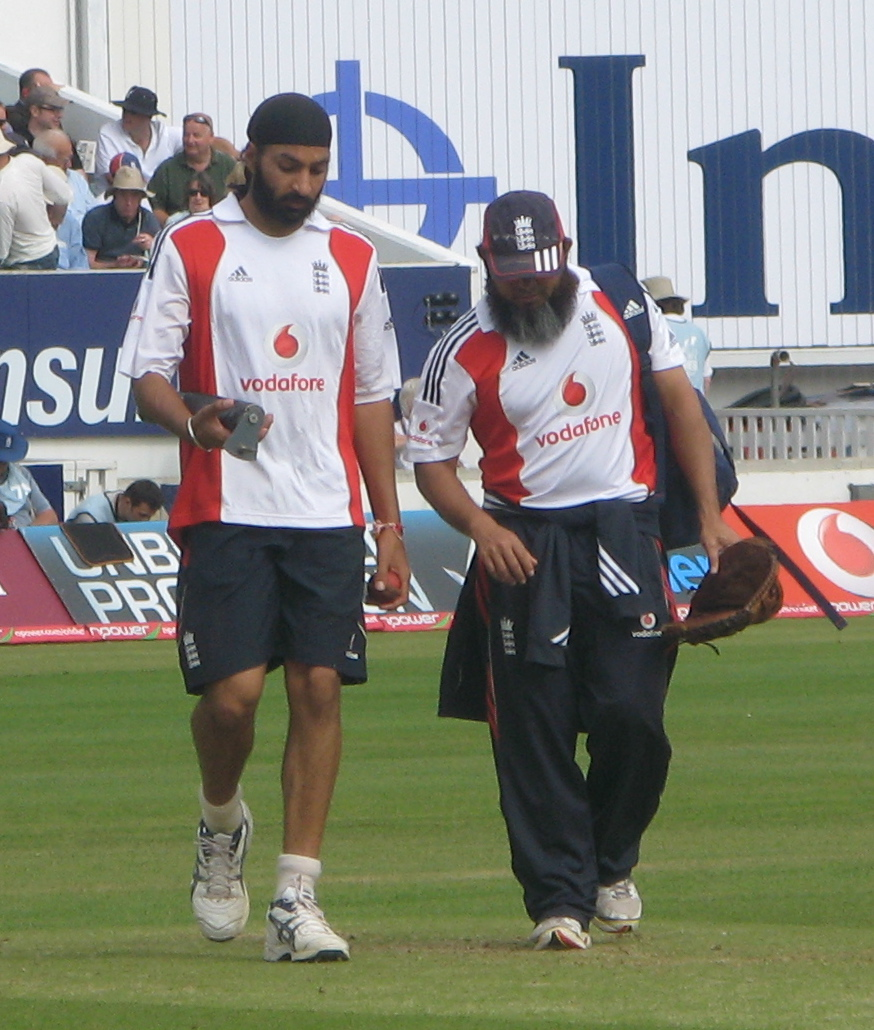
Musthaq Ahmed with English cricketer Monty Panesar during 2009 Ashes series

In late 2008, the England and Wales Cricket Board appointed Mushtaq as spin-bowling coach to the England cricket team until 2014 when lost his job in Peter Moores reshuffle. He joins batting coach Graham Gooch and Richard Halsall, the fielding coach in not retaining their roles. His major success as bowling was to install Graeme Swann as lead spin bowler for England cricket team

He was bowling coach of Surrey County Cricket Club for brief period of time in 2012. He was the spin bowling consultant of the Delhi Daredevils for the 2013 IPL season, declining to reprise the role the next year.

In 2014, Mushtaq was named as Pakistan cricket team's bowling consultant under new coach Waqar Younis and his contract ended in May 2016.

In April 2016, Mushtaq was named as head coach of Pakistan's National Cricket Academy. In November 2018 Ahmed was appointed as the assistant coach and spin consultant of West Indies national cricket team ahead of the tour of Bangladesh. In April 2019 Mushtaq was honoured with the Outstanding Achievement in Sport award at The Asian Awards.

On 9 June 2020, the PCB appointed Mushtaq Ahmed as their spin-bowling coach for Pakistan's tour to England.

On 16 April 2024, Bangladesh Cricket Board announced in a press release that Mushtaq Ahmed is appointed spin bowling coach for Bangladesh men's national cricket team; he will serve the team till the 2024 ICC Men's T20 World Cup.

== Autobiography ==
He released his autobiography entitled Twenty20 Vision : My Life and Inspiration in 2006, co-written with Andrew Sibson.
