= Michael Voss (cricketer) =

South African cricketer

Personal information
- Full name: Michael Frederick Voss
- Born: 10 November 1966 (age 60); Cape Town, Cape Province, South Africa
- Batting: Left-handed

Domestic team information
- Years: Team
- 1991: Hertfordshire
- 1991/92–1992/93: Western Province
- 1984/85–1991/92: Western Province B

Career statistics
| Competition | First-class | List A |
|---|---|---|
| Matches | 19 | 9 |
| Runs scored | 873 | 143 |
| Batting average | 15.00 | 15.88 |
| 100s/50s | 1/5 | –/– |
| Top score | 115 | 41 |
| Balls bowled | – | – |
| Wickets | – | – |
| Bowling average | – | – |
| 5 wickets in innings | – | – |
| 10 wickets in match | – | – |
| Best bowling | – | – |
| Catches/stumpings | 16/– | 2/– |
- Source: Cricinfo, 1 October 2011

Michael Frederick Voss (born 10 November 1966) is a former South African cricketer. Voss was a left-handed batsman. He was born in Cape Town, Cape Province.

Voss made his first-class debut for Western Province B against Orange Free State in the 1984/85 Castle Bowl. His next first-class appearance didn't come until the 1990/91 Castle Bowl when Western Province B played Eastern Province B. He made six further first-class appearances for Western Province B, the last of which came against Natal B in the 1991/92 President's Cup. In his eight first-class appearances for Western Province B, he scored 542 runs at an average of 33.87, with a high score of 115. This score, which was his only first-class century, came against Northern Transvaal B in 1991.

He also played first-class cricket for the Western Province first team, making his debut for the province against Transvaal in the 1990/91 Currie Cup. He made nine further first-class appearances for the province, the last of which came against Natal in the 1992/93 Castle Cup. In his ten first-class matches for the team, he scored 331 runs at an average of 17.42, with a high score of 56. It was for Western Province that he made his List A debut for against Eastern Province in the 1990/91 Benson and Hedges Series. He made seven further List A appearances for the province, the last of which came against Transvaal in the 1991/92 Benson and Hedges Series. In his eight List A appearances for the province, he scored 141 runs at an average of 17.62, with a high score of 41. In 1991, he played a single List A match in England for Hertfordshire in the NatWest Trophy against Warwickshire. He scored 2 runs in this match, before being dismissed by Paul Smith. Voss didn't feature in any Minor counties fixtures for the county.
