= Ricardo Powell =

Jamaican cricketer (born 1978)

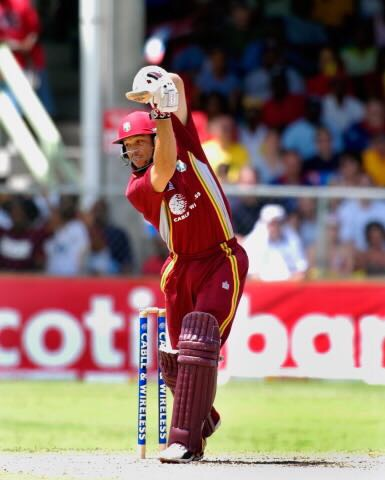

Personal information
- Full name: Ricardo Lloyd Powell
- Born: 16 December 1978 (age 47); St Elizabeth, Jamaica
- Batting: Right-handed
- Bowling: Right-arm offbreak
- Role: Batsman

International information
- National side: West Indies (1999–2005)
- Test debut (cap 231): 16 December 1999 v New Zealand
- Last Test: 10 April 2004 v England
- ODI debut (cap 94): 16 May 1999 v Pakistan
- Last ODI: 7 August 2005 v India
- ODI shirt no.: 34

Domestic team information
- Years: Team
- 1997–2003: Jamaica (squad no. 34)
- 2003–2006: Trinidad & Tobago (squad no. 34)

Career statistics
Competition	Test	ODI	FC	LA
Matches	2	109	37	149
Runs scored	53	2,085	1,584	2,778
Batting average	17.66	24.82	27.31	24.58
100s/50s	0/0	1/8	2/8	1/11
Top score	30	124	115	124
Balls bowled	78	473	1,550	971
Wickets	0	11	13	29
Bowling average	–	44.63	51.69	31.68
5 wickets in innings	–	0	0	0
10 wickets in match	–	0	0	0
Best bowling	–	2/5	3/75	3/27
Catches/stumpings	1/–	43/–	26/–	69/–
Medal record
Men's Cricket
Representing West Indies
ICC Champions Trophy
Winner	2004 England
- Source: , 26 June 2016

Ricardo Lloyd Powell (born 16 December 1978) is a former Jamaican cricketer who played for West Indies at international level. He represented Jamaica national cricket team as well as Trinidad and Tobago national cricket team from 1997 to 2005. Powell was a member of the West Indies team that won the 2004 ICC Champions Trophy.

== Domestic career ==
Powell was 19 when he made his first-class debut in the 1996–96 season and followed it up with a List A debut in the following year in 1998–99 season.

Powell moved from Jamaica in 2003 to his wife's native country of Trinidad. Powell took a hiatus from the game after his wife was diagnosed with breast cancer. He made his Twenty20 debut at Stanford Cricket Ground in Coolidge, Antigua when Trinidad and Tobago national cricket team played against Cayman Islands national cricket team in Stanford 20/20.

== International career ==
He was the youngest West Indian to score an ODI century. He made 2,000 ODI runs at a strike rate of 96.66, which is the highest strike rate of a West Indian player with more than 1000 ODI runs and he also emulated Gordon Greenidge by hitting 8 sixes in an ODI innings against India cricket team in 1999 at Singapore which was a West Indian ODI record.

He also hit seven sixes in another ODI against India cricket team at Toronto that same year. In total, he hit 75 sixes in 100 ODI innings, a ratio equal to that of Viv Richards. Such stunning performances from the 20-year-old led to comparisons with the great Viv Richards but for some reason the selectors seemed to pigeon-hole him as a One Day player, and he found himself in and out of the side, and being shunted up and down the batting order.

He played 109 One Day matches for the West Indies cricket team and 2 Tests matches in his career against New Zealand cricket team in 1999 and England cricket team in 2004 in which Brian Lara became first batsman to score 400 runs in Test cricket.

== US career ==
He played the game professionally and resides in the United States where he played cricket with the Indian Lions Cricket Club and worked as a Cricket Analyst with ESPN from 2012-2014.

In June 2016, Powell was named as new chairman of USA selection panel. The panel includes Asif Mujtaba, Michael Voss, Amer Afzaluddin and Barney Jones. His first assignment is to select USA senior men's for ICC World Cricket League Division Four which will be hosted Los Angeles as well as Under-17 squads. In June 2021, he was selected to take part in the Minor League Cricket tournament in the United States following the players' draft.

== Personal life ==
He is married to Caribbean TV talk show host Alicia Powell.
