= Kallang Ground =

Singaporean cricket ground

Coordinates: 1.30566°N 103.87815°E

- Kallang

Ground information
- Country: Singapore
- End names
- National Stadium End; Pavilion End

International information
- First men's ODI: 2 September 1999: West Indies v Zimbabwe
- Last men's ODI: 27 August 2000: Pakistan v South Africa
- As of 2 August 2008; Source: Cricinfo

The Kallang Ground is a cricket ground in Kallang, Singapore. The ground played host to nine One-Day Internationals in 1999 and 2000, and is a regular home ground for the Singapore national cricket team. It also hosted matches in the 1999 Youth Asia Cup, the Tuanku Ja'afar Cup in 2000 and 2004, and the 2002 ACC Trophy.
