= Stephen Fleming =

New Zealand cricketer

Stephen Fleming ONZM
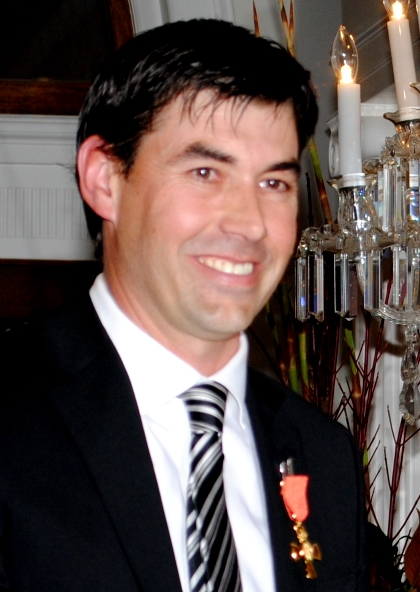
- Fleming in 2011

Personal information
- Full name: Stephen Paul Fleming
- Born: 1 April 1973 (age 53); Christchurch, New Zealand
- Height: 188 cm (6 ft 2 in)
- Batting: Left-handed
- Bowling: Right-arm medium-slow
- Role: Top-order batsman

International information
- National side: New Zealand (1994–2008)
- Test debut (cap 188): 19 March 1994 v India
- Last Test: 22 March 2008 v England
- ODI debut (cap 88): 25 March 1994 v India
- Last ODI: 24 April 2007 v Sri Lanka
- ODI shirt no.: 7
- T20I debut (cap 3): 17 February 2005 v Australia
- Last T20I: 26 December 2006 v Sri Lanka

Domestic team information
- Years: Team
- 1991/92–1999/00: Canterbury
- 2000/01–2008/09: Wellington
- 2001: Middlesex
- 2003: Yorkshire
- 2005–2007: Nottinghamshire
- 2008: Chennai Super Kings

Head coaching information
- Years: Team
- 2009–2015, 2018–2026: Chennai Super Kings
- 2015–2019: Melbourne Stars
- 2016–2017: Rising Pune Supergiant
- 2022–2026: Joburg Super Kings
- 2023–2026: Texas Super Kings
- 2026–: England
- 2023-2024: Southern Brave

Career statistics
Competition	Test	ODI	FC	LA
Matches	111	280	247	460
Runs scored	7,172	8,037	16,409	14,019
Batting average	40.06	32.40	43.87	35.13
100s/50s	9/46	8/49	35/93	22/86
Top score	274*	134*	274*	139*
Balls bowled	–	29	102	35
Wickets	–	1	0	2
Bowling average	–	28.00	–	15.50
5 wickets in innings	–	0	–	0
10 wickets in match	–	0	–	0
Best bowling	–	1/8	–	1/3
Catches/stumpings	171/–	133/–	340/–	225/–
Medal record
Men's cricket
Representing New Zealand
ICC KnockOut Trophy
Winner	2000 Kenya
Commonwealth Games
Bronze medal – third place	1998 Kuala Lumpur
- Source: ESPNcricinfo, 4 May 2017

Stephen Paul Fleming ONZM (born 1 April 1973) is a cricket coach and former captain of the New Zealand national cricket team. He is the current Test Match coach of the England Cricket Team. He was a left-handed opening batter and an occasional right arm slow medium bowler. He is New Zealand's second-most capped Test cricketer with 111 appearances. He is also the team's longest-serving and most successful captain with 28 test victories and led the team to win the 2000 ICC KnockOut Trophy, the team's first International Cricket Council trophy. Fleming captained New Zealand in the first ever Twenty20 International against Australia in 2005.

Fleming retired from international cricket on 26 March 2008. He played in the inaugural season of the Indian Premier League for Chennai Super Kings and became the team's coach in 2009. He was the team's head coach until 2026, and coached them to five IPL and two Champions League T20 titles. He also served as the head coach of other Super Kings franchises, Joburg Super Kings in the SA20 and Texas Super Kings in Major League Cricket.

He served as the coach of Melbourne Stars in the Big Bash League from 2015 to 2019. Fleming was appointed an Officer of the New Zealand Order of Merit, for services to cricket, in the 2011 Queen's Birthday Honours.

== Early and personal life ==
Fleming was born on 1 April 1973 in Christchurch to Pauline Fleming and Gary Kirk. Pauline raised him as a single mother, and he did not meet his father until he was 16. Fleming played rugby for Cashmere High like his father.

On 9 May 2007, Fleming married his long-term partner Kelly Payne in a ceremony in Wellington. The couple have a daughter, born in 2006, a son born 2008 and another daughter born 2011.

== Domestic career ==
Fleming has played county cricket in England for Middlesex, Yorkshire and Nottinghamshire. He captained Nottinghamshire to County Championship victory in 2005, their first Championship title in 18 years.

== International career ==
A left-handed batsman, Fleming made his test debut in March 1994 in the home series against India winning the Man of the Match award on debut after scoring 92. He made his ODI debut on 25 March 1994 in the first match of the ODI series that followed and scored an unbeaten 90. In England's tour of New Zealand in 1996–97, he scored his maiden test century in the first test at Auckland. In the third Test of the series, he took over the captaincy from Lee Germon becoming New Zealand's youngest captain at 23 years and 321 days. He led the New Zealand team to a bronze medal in the 1998 Commonwealth Games.

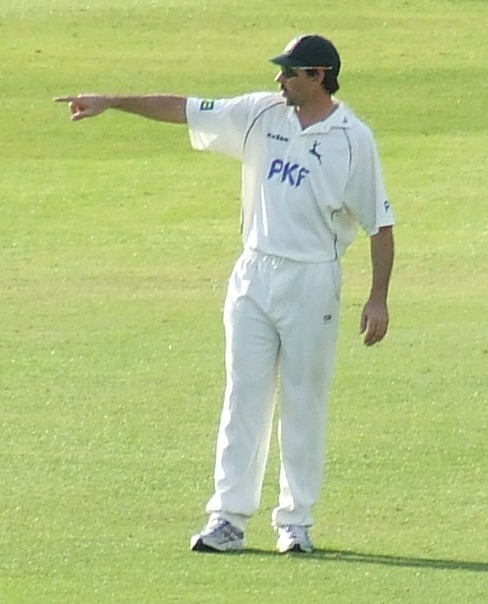
Fleming adjusting the field at Nottinghamshire

Fleming led the team to win the 2000 ICC KnockOut Trophy, which was New Zealand's first ICC trophy. Fleming became New Zealand's most successful test captain in September 2000 with a victory over Zimbabwe which was the 12th win under his captaincy overtaking Geoff Howarth and finished with 28 wins, the most by a New Zealand captain. Fleming's scored his best ODI score with an unbeaten 134 to help New Zealand beat hosts South Africa in the 2003 Cricket World Cup. Chasing a rain adjusted target of 229 off 39 overs, Fleming hit 134 off just 132 deliveries as New Zealand cruised to a 9-wicket victory. In February 2005, Fleming captained New Zealand in the first ever Twenty20 International against Australia. In the second Test between New Zealand and South Africa at Cape Town in April 2006, Fleming scored his 3rd Test double-century and became the first New Zealander to achieve this feat.

On 25 October 2006, Fleming captained his country for the 194th time in an ODI overtaking Arjuna Ranatunga for most matches as a captain and finished with 218 games as a captain, a record which has since been eclipsed only by Ricky Ponting. He captained the team in the 2007 World Cup and scored 353 runs at an average of 39.22, leading the team to the semi-finals. On 24 April 2007, Fleming resigned as captain in a post-match press conference held after the semi-Final defeat to Sri Lanka. In September 2007, Fleming was replaced by Daniel Vettori as the New Zealand captain. Fleming confirmed his retirement from the New Zealand team at the end of England's 2008 tour of New Zealand to spend more time with his family, and to play for the Indian Premier League. Fleming scored over 7000 runs in test cricket and took over 170 catches, the third highest Test aggregate for a non-wicket keeper.

== IPL career ==
Fleming was acquired by Chennai Super Kings (CSK) for US$350,000 for the inaugural season of Indian Premier League. He played just one season and scored 196 runs in ten matches with CSK finishing as runners-up.

== Coaching career ==
Fleming was appointed as the head coach of CSK in 2009 after he retired as a player. Under his coaching, CSK won the 2010 season and qualified for Champions League Twenty20. Chennai won the 2010 Champions league. Fleming coached CSK to its second consecutive IPL title in 2011 and its second Champions League Twenty20 title in 2014.

Following the two-year suspension of Chennai Super Kings and Rajasthan Royals, two new franchises Rising Pune Supergiants and Gujarat Lions were established for the 2016 Indian Premier League season. Supergiants appointed Fleming as the head coach. Fleming returned to Chennai Super Kings for the 2018 season. Fleming coached CSK to its third IPL title in 2018. Fleming led CSK to the title again in 2021 and 2023 IPL. CSK became the most successful IPL franchise with five title wins and ten final appearances during his stint as head coach. He was also appointed as the head coach of other Super Kings franchises, Joburg Super Kings of SA20 in 2022 and Texas Super Kings of Major League Cricket in 2023. On 13 July 2026, the Super Kings announced the decision to mutually part ways with head coach Fleming. On 30 July 2026, Fleming was announced as England Test Cricket Head Coach

=== Business interests ===
Fleming has been involved in setting up CricHQ with the company's CEO Simon Baker and former New Zealand cricket captain Brendon McCullum. Fleming is one of the investors and a director in the company. In June 2015, the company raised US$10m from Singapore private equity firm Tembusu Partners.

== Playing style ==
Fleming was an elegant left handed batter and played shots such as the flick off the pads, straight drive, cover drive and cut shots. He was also a prolific slip catcher and was particularly noted for his captaincy, having been praised by Shane Warne as the "best captain in world cricket".

== Statistics ==
=== Centuries ===
Fleming, a left-handed batsman, has made 17 centuries in international cricket – nine in Test matches and eight in One Day Internationals – and sits ninety-sixth in the list of century-makers in international cricket.

Test

Test centuries scored by Stephen Fleming
No.	Score	Opponent	Pos.	Inn.	Venue	Date	Result	Ref
1	129	England	4	1	Eden Park, Auckland	24 January 1997	Drawn	
2	174*	Sri Lanka	3	3	R. Premadasa Stadium, Colombo	27 May 1998	Won	
3	105	Australia	4	1	WACA Ground, Perth	30 November 2001	Drawn	
4	130	West Indies	3	1	Kensington Oval, Bridgetown	21 June 2002	Won	
5	274*	Sri Lanka	3	1	Paikiasothy Saravanamuttu Stadium, Colombo	25 April 2003	Drawn	
6	192	Pakistan	3	1	Seddon Park, Hamilton	19 December 2003	Drawn	
7	117	England	2	1	Trent Bridge, Nottingham	4 June 2004	Lost	
8	202	Bangladesh	3	1	M. A. Aziz Stadium, Chattogram	26 October 2004	Won	
9	262	South Africa	3	1	Newlands Cricket Ground, Cape Town	27 April 2006	Drawn	

ODI

ODI centuries scored by Stephen Fleming
No.	Score	Opponent	Pos.	Venue	Date	Result	Ref
1	106*	West Indies	4	Queen's Park Oval, Port of Spain	29 March 1996	Won	
2	116*	Australia	4	Melbourne Cricket Ground	21 January 1998	Won	
3	111*	Australia	4	McLean Park, Napier	12 February 1998	Won	
4	134*	South Africa	2	New Wanderers, Johannesburg	16 February 2003	Won (D/L)	
5	115*	Pakistan	2	Lancaster Park, Christchurch	10 January 2004	Won	
6	108	South Africa	2	Lancaster Park, Christchurch	17 February 2004	Won	
7	106	England	2	Brisbane Cricket Ground	6 February 2007	Lost	
8	102	Bangladesh	2	Sir Vivian Richards Stadium, North Sound	2 April 2007	Won	

=== Captaincy ===
Fleming had captained New Zealand in 303 matches including 80 Test matches, 218 ODIs and 5 T20Is, a New Zealand record and the third highest ever.

Fleming captaincy record
Type	Matches	Won	Lost	Drawn	Tied	No result	Win %
Test	80	28	27	25	0	0	35.00
ODI	218	98	106	0	1	13	44.95
T20I	5	2	2	0	1	0	40.00

== Records and achievements ==
Tests

- Most wins by a New Zealand captain (28)
- Second most number of matches as captain (80)
- Third most runs for New Zealand (7172)
- Third most matches for New Zealand (111)
- Most fifties for New Zealand (46)

ODIs

- Most wins by a New Zealand captain (98)
- Second most number of matches as captain (218)
- Third most runs as captain (6295)
- Most matches for New Zealand (279)
- Second most runs for New Zealand (8007)
- Second most fifties for New Zealand (49)

Combined

- Third most international matches as captain (303)
- First non-wicket keeper to take 300 catches in international matches

== Honors ==
Fleming was appointed an Officer of the New Zealand Order of Merit, for services to cricket, in the 2011 Queen's Birthday Honours.

=== Player ===
New Zealand

- ICC Champions Trophy: 2000
- Commonwealth Games: 1998 (Bronze)

Nottinghamshire

- County Championship: 2005

=== Coach ===
Chennai Super Kings

- Indian Premier League: 2010, 2011, 2018, 2021, 2023
- Champions League: 2010, 2014

== Controversies ==
In 1995, Fleming was caught and admitted to smoking marijuana with teammates Matthew Hart and Dion Nash while on tour at their hotel.

Sporting positions
Preceded by Lee Germon	New Zealand national cricket captain 1996–2007	Succeeded by Daniel Vettori
Preceded by Jason Gallian	Nottinghamshire cricket captain 2005–2007	Succeeded by Chris Read
Preceded by Kepler Wessels	Chennai Super Kings coach 2009–2026	Succeeded by Vacant
Preceded by Greg Shipperd	Melbourne Stars coach 2015–2019	Succeeded by David Hussey
