= Australian cricket team in the West Indies in 1998–99 =

International cricket tour

	West Indies	Australia
- Dates: 22 February 1999 – 25 April 1999
Captains	Brian Lara (Tests, 1st–4th ODI); Jimmy Adams (5th–7th ODI)	Steve Waugh

Test series
- Result: 4-match series drawn 2–2
Most runs	Brian Lara (546)	Steve Waugh (409)
Most wickets	Courtney Walsh (26)	Glenn McGrath (30)
- Player of the series: Brian Lara (WI)

One Day International series
- Results: 7-match series drawn 3–3
Most runs	Sherwin Campbell (312)	Michael Bevan (240)
Most wickets	Mervyn Dillon (12)	Shane Warne (13)
- Player of the series: Sherwin Campbell (WI)

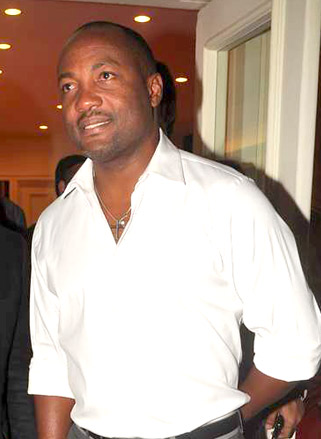
West Indian captain Brian Lara, pictured here in 2012, scored the most runs in the Test series with 546 and was named man of the series.

The Australian cricket team toured the Caribbean from February to April 1999 to play four Tests and seven One Day Internationals (ODIs) against the West Indies. Australia additionally played three first-class matches, winning two and drawing one. The Test series was drawn 2–2 resulting in the Frank Worrell Trophy remaining in Australia. The ODI series was also drawn with three wins each and one tie. This was the first four-match series in the history of Test cricket to finish as a two-all draw. The only other four-match Test series, as of January 2024, to finish with the same result was England at home to Pakistan in 2016.

== Background ==
The West Indies Cricket Board (WICB) announced in June 1998 that Sabina Park would host the first Test – the first following the abandonment of the Test between England and the West Indies after just 62 deliveries in January 1998.

This was the 19th Test series between these two teams and the 16th time they were contesting the Frank Worrell Trophy. Australia last toured the West Indies in 1995 securing the trophy for the first time since 1976. Australia retained the trophy in 1996–97 winning the series 3–2. Since then, Australia won Test series at home against New Zealand and South Africa and away against South Africa, England and Pakistan. Their only loss came in their tour of India in 1998. Meanwhile, the West Indies were successful against India, Sri Lanka and England at home but lost away to Pakistan.

Immediately prior to this tour, Australia won a home Ashes series against England, and won an ODI tri-series against England and Sri Lanka. Australia's Test captain Mark Taylor initially indicated that he would continue to lead the side for this tour, but in February 1999 he announced his retirement. Steve Waugh, who had held the captaincy of the ODI side for 18 months, was appointed as the new Test captain with Shane Warne as his deputy. Conversely, the West Indies on their first tour of South Africa in the post-apartheid era had suffered their first 5–0 Test whitewash and lost the ODI series 6–1. Brian Lara led a player revolt against the WICB over pay and conditions and the tour was delayed by a week. He was stripped of the captaincy and later reinstated as skipper. Following the South African tour, the board announced that Lara would be retained as captain for the Australian series.

== Summary ==
The West Indies continued their poor form in the opening match of the Test series, posting their lowest innings score of 51 and losing the match by 312 runs. They fought back in the second Test breaking their six-match losing streak with Lara scoring 213. The third Test was described by Steve Waugh as the best Test match he had ever played in. Lara led his team to a one-wicket victory with his second innings score of 153 not out rated by Wisden as the second-best innings in the history of Test cricket. Leg spinner Shane Warne was dropped for the final Test, which Australia won by 176 runs. This was the second-drawn series of the Frank Worrell Trophy with the 1981–82 series finishing at one-all.

Following the Test series, the two teams played in their first seven-match bilateral ODI series against each other. In a back-and-forth series which saw neither team win back-to-back matches, the series ended three games-all. These were the final ODI matches for both teams before the 1999 Cricket World Cup in England which Australia went on to win. Lara was rested due to a wrist injury for the final three matches with Jimmy Adams standing in as captain. The series was marred by poor crowd behaviour by the West Indian supporters. The fifth ODI ended in a tie after the crowd invaded the ground in scenes almost identical to the final ODI match between Pakistan and the West Indies at the same ground six years earlier. The WICB later apologised for the incident. The final ODI match was suspended for over an hour due to spectators throwing glass bottles and other debris onto the ground in protest at Sherwin Campbell being obstructed by Brendon Julian and being given run out. One of the bottles narrowly missed captain Steve Waugh. This mirrored a similar incident at the same ground in March 1979 during the second Supertest between WSC Australians and WSC West Indies. Midway through the final day's play, the crowd threw bottles onto the ground after the controversial lbw dismissal of Roy Fredericks. Play did not resume and the match ended in a draw. Prior to the final ODI match, the former West Indian captain Carl Hooper announced his retirement from international cricket.

== Squads ==
Tests		ODIs	
West Indies	Australia	West Indies	Australia
Brian Lara (c); Jimmy Adams; Curtly Ambrose; Sherwin Campbell; Shivnarine Chanderpaul; Corey Collymore; Pedro Collins; Mervyn Dillon; Daren Ganga; Adrian Griffith; Wavell Hinds; Roland Holder; Carl Hooper; Ridley Jacobs (wk); Dave Joseph; Reon King; Nehemiah Perry; Suruj Ragoonath; Lincoln Roberts; Phil Simmons; Courtney Walsh	Steve Waugh (c); Shane Warne (vc); Andy Bichel; Greg Blewett; Adam Dale; Matthew Elliott; Adam Gilchrist (wk); Jason Gillespie; Ian Healy (wk); Justin Langer; Stuart MacGill; Glenn McGrath; Colin Miller; Ricky Ponting; Michael Slater; Mark Waugh	Brian Lara (c); Jimmy Adams; Curtly Ambrose; Keith Arthurton; Henderson Bryan; Sherwin Campbell; Shivnarine Chanderpaul; Mervyn Dillon; Carl Hooper; Ridley Jacobs (wk); Reon King; Nehemiah Perry; Phil Simmons; Courtney Walsh; Stuart Williams	Steve Waugh (c); Shane Warne (vc); Michael Bevan; ~~Andy Bichel~~; ~~Adam Dale~~; Damien Fleming; Adam Gilchrist (wk); Brendon Julian; Shane Lee; Darren Lehmann; Damien Martyn; Glenn McGrath; Tom Moody; Ricky Ponting; Paul Reiffel; Mark Waugh

A fifteen-man squad for the West Indies was announced on 1 March 1999 for the first Test. Ahead of the second Test the WICB named a thirteen-man squad which excluded Corey Collymore and Phil Simmons. Roland Holder was injured during the 1st Test and was replaced by Daren Ganga. Mervyn Dillon was dropped for Nehemiah Perry. Collymore was then brought back into the squad to replace Reon King who injured his shoulder. The thirteen man squad announced ahead of the third Test saw Adrian Griffith, Carl Hooper and Shivnarine Chanderpaul coming in as replacements for Suruj Ragoonath, Daren Ganga and Lincoln Roberts. Hooper was unavailable for first two Tests with his child being sick and Chanderpaul was unavailable due to injury. The only change to the West Indies squad for the fourth Test was Wavell Hinds being brought in for Shivnarine Chanderpaul who did not play in the third Test due to his right shoulder injury.

For Australia, the only change to the Test squad came ahead of the fourth Test when backup wicket-keeper Adam Gilchrist was called in as a possible replacement for Ian Healy due to issues with his calf muscles. Healy however played in the final Test.

During the fourth Test, Adam Dale came down with pneumonia and returned to Australia for treatment. He was replaced by the One Day International squad with Andy Bichel. Before the second ODI, the squad was reduced to 14 with Bichel being removed.

== Tour matches ==
=== 3-day match: West Indies Board XI v Australians ===
22–24 February 1999
Scorecard

Australians	v	West Indies Board XI
156 (54.1 overs); Greg Blewett 52 (104); Ryan Hinds 4/23 (10 overs)		55 (29.5 overs); Pedro Collins 21* (31); Adam Dale 7/24 (14.5 overs)
209/4d (74.1 overs); Ricky Ponting 61* (140); Ryan Hinds 2/37 (17.1 overs)		121/4 (59 overs); Adrian Griffith 38* (166); Stuart MacGill 2/21 (12 overs)

Match drawn
Antigua Recreation Ground, St. John's, Antigua and Barbuda
Umpires: Clancy Mack (WI) and Basil Morgan (WI)

- Australians won the toss and elected to bat.
- On Day 1 rain stopped play from 11:32 to 11:51, from 11:59 (lunch taken) to 13:00, and from 13:16 to 13:57. Bad light stopped play at 16:57. On Day 3 rain delayed the start of play until 10:30 and stopped play from lunch and 12:49 and from 15:45 to 16:14. The match ended at 16:37 (6 overs early).

=== 4-day match: West Indies Board President's XI v Australians ===
27 February – 1 March 1999 (Note: While four days of play were scheduled, this tour match reached a result in three days.)
Scorecard

West Indies Board President's XI	v	Australians
177 (64.5 overs); Dave Joseph 64 (111); Stuart MacGill 6/45 (18.5 overs)		368 (86.3 overs); Mark Waugh 106 (131); Reon King 5/75 (25 overs)
185 (56.1 overs); Suruj Ragoonath 53 (97); Stuart MacGill 7/29 (15.1 overs)

Australians won by an innings and 6 runs
Guaracara Park, Pointe-à-Pierre, Trinidad and Tobago
Umpires: Terrance Birbal (WI) and Zainool Maccum (WI)

- West Indies Board President's XI won the toss and elected to bat.
- Bad light ended play early on Days 1 and 2.
- Greg Blewett (Aus) scored his 9,000th first-class run.
- Suruj Ragoonath (WI Board President's XI) scored his 3,000th first-class run.

=== 4-day match: West Indies A v Australians ===
20–23 March 1999
Scorecard

Australians	v	(Cricket West Indies) West Indies A
303 (93.2 overs); Justin Langer 134 (285); Carl Hooper 5/53 (28.2 overs)		102 (49.1 overs); Stuart Williams 24 (65); Stuart MacGill 3/3 (3.1 overs)
263/8d (87.4 overs); Matthew Elliott 115 (229); Carl Hooper 4/40 (13.4 overs)		310 (105.5 overs); Carl Hooper 102 (194); Adam Dale 6/67 (30.5 overs)

Australians won by 154 runs
Antigua Recreation Ground, St. John's, Antigua and Barbuda
Umpires: Clancy Mack (WI) and Basil Morgan (WI)

- Australians won the toss and elected to bat.
- Bad light ended play early on Days 1 and 2.
- On Day 3 rain stopped play during the final session and bad light ended play early.

== Test series ==
=== 1st Test ===
5–8 March 1999 (Note: While five days of play were scheduled for each Test, the first and second Tests reached a result in four days.)
Scorecard

Australia	v	West Indies
269 (121.3 overs); Greg Blewett 58 (182); Curtly Ambrose 3/35 (27 overs)		167 (57 overs); Brian Lara 62 (111); Glenn McGrath 5/50 (14 overs)
261 (86.2 overs); Michael Slater 106 (205); Courtney Walsh 4/71 (25.2 overs)		51 (19.1 overs); Ridley Jacobs 19 (22); Glenn McGrath 5/28 (10 overs)

Australia won by 312 runs
Queen's Park Oval, Port of Spain, Trinidad
Umpires: Eddie Nicholls (WI) and Peter Willey (Eng)
Player of the match: Glenn McGrath (Aus)

- Australia won the toss and elected to bat.
- On Day 3 rain stopped play from 11:34 to 11:55 and from 13:06 to 13:41. Bad light stopped play at 17:58. Play began 8 minutes early at 09:57 on Day 4 to make up for time lost on Day 3. Rain stopped play at 11:57 and an early lunch was taken.
- Suruj Ragoonath, Dave Joseph and Pedro Collins (WI) all made their Test debut.
- Roland Holder (WI) played his final Test match.
- Steve Waugh captained Australia for the first time in Tests.
- Courtney Walsh (WI) took his 400th Test wicket.
- Glenn McGrath took his first ten-wicket haul in a Test match.
- The West Indies total of 51 in the second innings was the lowest innings score by the West Indies in Tests.

=== 2nd Test ===
13–16 March 1999
Scorecard

Australia	v	West Indies
256 (71.3 overs); Steve Waugh 100 (165); Courtney Walsh 4/55 (20 overs)		431 (132.3 overs); Brian Lara 213 (344); Glenn McGrath 5/93 (35 overs)
177 (66 overs); Greg Blewett 30 (80); Nehemiah Perry 5/70 (26 overs)		3/0 (0.3 overs); Suruj Ragoonath 2* (2)

West Indies won by 10 wickets
Sabina Park, Kingston, Jamaica
Umpires: Steve Bucknor (WI) and Peter Willey (Eng)
Player of the match: Brian Lara (WI)

- Australia won the toss and elected to bat.
- Nehemiah Perry (WI) made his Test debut.
- Lincoln Roberts (WI) played his only Test.
- Suruj Ragoonath (WI) played his final Test match.
- Brian Lara (WI) scored his 5,000th Test run.
- Brian Lara and Jimmy Adams' partnership of 322 is the highest fifth-wicket partnership for the West Indies in Tests.
- Nehemiah Perry became the seventh West Indian to take a five-wicket haul on Test debut.
- This was the West Indies' first victory in seven matches and their sixth 10-wicket victory against Australia.

=== 3rd Test ===
26–30 March 1999
Scorecard

Australia	v	West Indies
490 (153.4 overs); Steve Waugh 199 (376); Nehemiah Perry 3/102 (33 overs)		329 (103.5 overs); Sherwin Campbell 105 (271); Glenn McGrath 4/128 (33 overs)
146 (50.1 overs); Shane Warne 32 (48); Courtney Walsh 5/39 (17.1 overs)		311/9 (120.1 overs); Brian Lara 153* (256); Glenn McGrath 5/92 (44 overs)

West Indies won by 1 wicket
Kensington Oval, Bridgetown, Barbados
Umpires: Eddie Nicholls (WI) and Dave Orchard (SA)
Player of the match: Brian Lara (WI)

- Australia won the toss and elected to bat.
- Rain briefly stopped play during the middle sessions of Day 1 and 3.
- Justin Langer scored his 1,000th run in Tests.
- Steve Waugh and Ricky Ponting's partnership of 281 is the highest Australian fifth-wicket partnership against the West Indies in Tests.
- This was the West Indies' first one-wicket victory in Tests and Australia's fourth Test loss by a margin of one wicket.

=== 4th Test ===
3–7 April 1999
Scorecard

Australia	v	West Indies
303 (111.5 overs); Steve Waugh 72* (166); Curtly Ambrose 5/94 (29.5 overs)		222 (76.2 overs); Brian Lara 100 (84); Glenn McGrath 3/64 (27.2 overs)
306 (121.4 overs); Justin Langer 127 (308); Courtney Walsh 4/78 (32.4 overs)		211 (102.5 overs); Adrian Griffith 56 (218); Glenn McGrath 3/50 (35.5 overs)

Australia won by 176 runs
Antigua Recreation Ground, St John's, Antigua
Umpires: Steve Bucknor (WI) and Dave Orchard (SA)
Player of the match: Justin Langer (Aus)

- Australia won the toss and elected to bat.
- Corey Collymore (WI) made his Test debut.
- Adam Dale (Aus) and Dave Joseph (WI) played their final Test.
- Greg Blewett (Aus) and Sherwin Campbell (WI) both scored their 2,000th Test run.
- Mark Waugh (Aus) scored his 6,000th Test run.
- Australia's Glenn McGrath was fined 30 per cent of his match fee after he was charged for bringing the game into disrepute. At the close of Day 4, McGrath spat in the vicinity of West Indies opening batsmen Adrian Griffith. McGrath was already serving a suspended sentence for swearing at Alan Mullally during the Boxing Day Test in Melbourne against England four months prior.

== ODI series ==
=== 1st ODI ===
11 April 1999
09:35
Scorecard

West Indies; 209 (48.1 overs)	v	Australia; 165 (41.5 overs)
Sherwin Campbell 62 (105); Damien Fleming 3/41 (9.1 overs)		Brendon Julian 35 (42); Henderson Bryan 4/24 (10 overs)

West Indies won by 44 runs
Arnos Vale Stadium, Arnos Vale, Saint Vincent and the Grenadines
Umpires: Eddie Nicholls (WI) and Billy Doctrove (WI)
Player of the match: Henderson Bryan (WI)

- Australia won the toss and elected to field.
- Henderson Bryan (WI) and Nehemiah Perry (WI) both made their ODI debut.
- Australia's innings was limited to 47 overs due to their slow over rate.
- Henderson Bryan's bowling figures of 4/24 were the best by a West Indian on One Day International debut.

=== 2nd ODI ===
14 April 1999
09:35
Scorecard

Australia; 288/4 (50 overs)	v	West Indies; 242 (47.3 overs)
Darren Lehmann 110* (92); Reon King 2/53 (10 overs)		Sherwin Campbell 46 (77); Shane Warne 3/39 (10 overs)

Australia won by 46 runs
National Cricket Stadium, St. George's, Grenada
Umpires: Steve Bucknor (WI) and Billy Doctrove (WI)
Player of the match: Darren Lehmann (Aus)

- Australia won the toss and elected to bat.
- This was the first ODI match to be played at this ground.
- Darren Lehmann and Michael Bevan's unbroken partnership of 172 is the highest fifth-wicket partnership for Australia in ODIs.
- Australia's total of 288/4 was the highest innings score against the West Indies.

=== 3rd ODI ===
17 April 1999
09:35
Scorecard

Australia; 242/7 (50 overs)	v	West Indies; 244/5 (49 overs)
Mark Waugh 74 (100); Nehemiah Perry 3/45 (10 overs)		Jimmy Adams 82 (102); Damien Fleming 3/49 (10 overs)

West Indies won by 5 wickets
Queen's Park Oval, Port of Spain, Trinidad and Tobago
Umpires: Steve Bucknor (WI) and Basil Morgan (WI)
Player of the match: Jimmy Adams (WI)

- Australia won the toss and elected to bat.
- Sherwin Campbell (WI) scored his 1,000th ODI run.

=== 4th ODI ===
18 April 1999
09:35
Scorecard

Australia; 189/9 (50 overs)	v	West Indies; 169 (46.2 overs)
Michael Bevan 59* (103); Mervyn Dillon 4/20 (10 overs)		Phil Simmons 42 (49); Shane Warne 3/35 (10 overs)

Australia won by 20 runs
Queen's Park Oval, Port of Spain, Trinidad and Tobago
Umpires: Steve Bucknor (WI) and Basil Morgan (WI)
Player of the match: Shane Warne (Aus)

- Australia won the toss and elected to bat.

=== 5th ODI ===
21 April 1999
09:35
Scorecard

West Indies; 173/5 (30 overs)	v	Australia; 173/7 (30 overs)
Sherwin Campbell 41 (41); Shane Lee 3/39 (6 overs)		Steve Waugh 72* (65); Mervyn Dillon 3/25 (6 overs)

Match tied
Bourda, Georgetown, Guyana
Umpires: Eddie Nicholls (WI) and Billy Doctrove (WI)
Player of the match: Steve Waugh (Aus) and Mervyn Dillon (WI)

- Australia won the toss and elected to field.
- Rain prevented the start of play until 13:00 and the scheduled finishing time was extended by 15 minutes to 17:20. The match was reduced to 30 overs per side and a limit of 6 overs per bowler.
- Jimmy Adams captained the West Indies for the first time in ODIs.
- The match was declared a tie by the match referee Raman Subba Row after the crowd invaded the ground on the final ball and removed the stumps.

=== 6th ODI ===
24 April 1999
09:35
Scorecard

West Indies; 249/8 (50 overs)	v	Australia; 253/6 (48.3 overs)
Ridley Jacobs 68 (56); Shane Warne 3/28 (10 overs)		Adam Gilchrist 64 (55); Reon King 2/50 (10 overs)

Australia won by 4 wickets
Kensington Oval, Bridgetown, Barbados
Umpires: Eddie Nicholls (WI) and Basil Morgan (WI)
Player of the match: Adam Gilchrist (Aus)

- West Indies won the toss and elected to bat.

=== 7th ODI ===
25 April 1999
09:35
Scorecard

Australia; 252/9 (50 overs)	v	West Indies; 197/2 (37 overs)
Tom Moody 50 (80); Reon King 3/59 (9 overs)		Sherwin Campbell 62 (102); Steve Waugh 1/17 (3 overs)

West Indies won by 8 wickets (D/L method)
Kensington Oval, Bridgetown, Barbados
Umpires: Eddie Nicholls (WI) and Basil Morgan (WI)
Player of the match: Sherwin Campbell (WI)

- Australia won the toss and elected to bat.
- The match was delayed by 45 minutes after the crowd threw debris on the ground in protest against the run out decision of Sherwin Campbell who was hindered by the bowler Brendon Julian. Steve Waugh led his players off the ground and eventually decided to withdraw the appeal as the police could not guarantee their safety. The match resumed with a revised target of the West Indies of 196 runs from 40 overs as determined by the Duckworth–Lewis method.
- Shivnarine Chanderpaul (WI) scored his 2,000th ODI run.
