= English cricket team in the West Indies in 1997–98 =

English cricket tour

| | England | West Indies |
- Dates: 16 January – 8 April 1998
| Captains | Mike Atherton | Brian Lara |

Test series
- Result: West Indies won the 6-match series 3–1
| Most runs | Alec Stewart (452) | Brian Lara (417) |
| Most wickets | Angus Fraser (27) | Curtly Ambrose (30) |
- Player of the series: Curtly Ambrose

One Day International series
- Results: West Indies won the 5-match series 4–1
| Most runs | Nick Knight (295) | Brian Lara (299) |
| Most wickets | Adam Hollioake (4) | Phil Simmons (9) |
- Player of the series: Curtly Ambrose

The English cricket team toured the West Indies from 16 January to 8 April 1998 as part of the 1997–98 West Indies cricket season. The tour included six Tests and five One Day Internationals, with West Indies winning the Test series 3–1 and the ODI series 4–1. Originally five Tests were scheduled; however, the opening Test at Sabina Park was called off after 62 deliveries due to an unsafe pitch, and a sixth Test in Trinidad was hurriedly scheduled to take its place. This is the most recent six-match Test series in international cricket.

== Squads ==
| Test Squads | | ODI Squads | |
| England | West Indies | England | West Indies |
|---|---|---|---|
| Mike Atherton (c) | Brian Lara (c) | Adam Hollioake (c) | Brian Lara (c) |
| Nasser Hussain (vc) | David Williams (wk) | Alec Stewart (wk) | Ridley Jacobs (wk) |
| Jack Russell (wk) | Junior Murray (wk) | Jack Russell (wk) | Junior Murray (wk) |
| Mark Butcher | Jimmy Adams | Mike Atherton | Curtly Ambrose |
| Andy Caddick | Curtly Ambrose | Dougie Brown | Keith Arthurton |
| Ashley Cowan | Kenny Benjamin | Robert Croft | Shivnarine Chanderpaul |
| John Crawley | Ian Bishop | Mark Ealham | Mervyn Dillon |
| Robert Croft | Sherwin Campbell | Matthew Fleming | Carl Hooper |
| Angus Fraser | Shivnarine Chanderpaul | Angus Fraser (added) | Clayton Lambert |
| Dean Headley | Mervyn Dillon | Ashley Giles (withdrawn) | Rawl Lewis |
| Adam Hollioake | Roland Holder | Dean Headley | Nixon McLean |
| Mark Ramprakash | Carl Hooper | Ben Hollioake | Franklyn Rose |
| Chris Silverwood | Nixon McLean | Graeme Hick | Phil Simmons |
| Alec Stewart | Clayton Lambert | Nick Knight | Carl Tuckett |
| Graham Thorpe | Dinanath Ramnarine | Mark Ramprakash | Philo Wallace |
| Phil Tufnell | Franklyn Rose | Graham Thorpe | Courtney Walsh |
| | Philo Wallace | | Stuart Williams |
| | Courtney Walsh | | |
| | Stuart Williams | | |

== Test series – The Wisden Trophy ==
=== 1st Test ===
29 January 1998
(5-day match)
Scorecard

| England | v | West Indies |
| 17/3 (10.1 overs); AJ Stewart 9* (26); CA Walsh 2/10 (5.1 overs) |

Match drawn (abandoned)
Sabina Park, Kingston, Jamaica
Umpires: SA Bucknor (WI) and S Venkataraghavan (IND)
Player of the match: No award

- England won the toss and elected to bat.
- The match was abandoned on the first morning due to an unfit pitch.
- An additional Test was scheduled for 5–9 February at Port of Spain.
- NAM McLean (WI) made his Test debut.

=== 2nd Test ===
5–9 February 1998
(5-day match)
Scorecard

| England | v | West Indies |
| 214 (109 overs); N Hussain 61* (202); CEL Ambrose 3/23 (26 overs) | | 191 (73.1 overs); BC Lara 55 (100); ARC Fraser 8/53 (16.1 overs) |
| 258 (94.5 overs); AJ Stewart 73 (154); CEL Ambrose 5/52 (19.5 overs) | | 282/7 (98.2 overs); CL Hooper 94* (203); ARC Fraser 3/57 (27 overs) |

West Indies won by 3 wickets
Queen's Park Oval, Port of Spain, Trinidad and Tobago
Umpires: SA Bucknor (WI) and S Venkataraghavan (IND)
Player of the match: CL Hooper (WI)

- England won the toss and elected to bat.

=== 3rd Test ===
13–17 February 1998
(5-day match)
Scorecard

| West Indies | v | England |
| 159 (67.4 overs); BC Lara 42 (53); ARC Fraser 5/40 (20.4 overs) | | 145 (71.4 overs); AJ Stewart 44 (112); CEL Ambrose 5/25 (15.4 overs) |
| 210 (85.3 overs); JC Adams 53 (161); ARC Fraser 4/40 (25.3 overs) | | 225/7 (108 overs); AJ Stewart 83 (245); CEL Ambrose 3/62 (33 overs) |

England won by 3 wickets
Queen's Park Oval, Port of Spain, Trinidad and Tobago
Umpires: DB Hair (AUS) and EA Nicholls (WI)
Player of the match: ARC Fraser (ENG)

- England won the toss and elected to field.

=== 4th Test ===
27 February–2 March 1998
(5-day match)
Scorecard

| West Indies | v | England |
| 352 (128.1 overs); S Chanderpaul 118 (263); RDB Croft 3/89 (36.1 overs) | | 170 (87.1 overs); MR Ramprakash 64* (179); D Ramnarine 3/26 (17 overs) |
| 197 (72 overs); IR Bishop 44* (94); DW Headley 3/37 (13 overs) | | 137 (62.1 overs); MR Ramprakash 34 (110); CEL Ambrose 4/38 (14.1 overs) |

West Indies won by 242 runs
Bourda, Georgetown, Guyana
Umpires: SA Bucknor (WI) and DB Hair (AUS)
Player of the match: S Chanderpaul (WI)

- West Indies won the toss and elected to bat.
- The match was scheduled for five days but completed in four.
- D Ramnarine (WI) made his Test debut.

=== 5th Test ===
12–16 March 1998
(5-day match)
Scorecard

| England | v | West Indies |
| 403 (153.5 overs); MR Ramprakash 154 (388); CL Hooper 5/80 (37.5 overs) | | 262 (107.3 overs); CB Lambert 55 (197); DW Headley 3/64 (17.3 overs) |
| 233/3d (71 overs); MA Atherton 64 (157); IR Bishop 2/51 (14 overs) | | 112/2 (37.3 overs); PA Wallace 61 (101); AR Caddick 1/19 (6 overs) |

Match drawn
Kensington Oval, Bridgetown, Barbados
Umpires: CJ Mitchley (SA) and EA Nicholls (WI)
Player of the match: MR Ramprakash (ENG)

- West Indies won the toss and elected to field.

=== 6th Test ===
20–24 March 1998
(5-day match)
Scorecard

| England | v | West Indies |
| 127 (70.5 overs); N Hussain 37 (124); D Ramnarine 4/29 (17 overs) | | 500/7d (131 overs); CL Hooper 108* (150); AR Caddick 3/111 (26 overs) |
| 321 (147.2 overs); N Hussain 106 (318); CA Walsh 2/70 (46 overs) |

West Indies won by an innings and 52 runs
Antigua Recreation Ground, St. John's, Antigua and Barbuda
Umpires: SA Bucknor (WI) and CJ Mitchley (SA)
Player of the match: D Ramnarine (WI)

- West Indies won the toss and elected to field.

== ODI series summary ==
West Indies won the Cable and Wireless Trophy 4–1.

=== 1st ODI ===
29 March 1998
Scorecard

| England; 293/5 (50 overs) | v | West Indies; 277 (46.5 overs) |
| NV Knight 122 (130); PV Simmons 2/58 (8 overs) | | BC Lara 110 (106); MA Ealham 2/37 (7.5 overs) |

England won by 16 runs
Kensington Oval, Bridgetown, Barbados
Umpires: BEW Morgan and EA Nicholls
Player of the match: NV Knight (ENG)

- West Indies won the toss and elected to field.

=== 2nd ODI ===
1 April 1998
Scorecard

| England; 266 (50 overs) | v | West Indies; 267/9 (49.5 overs) |
| NV Knight 90 (107); PV Simmons 3/46 (8 overs) | | SC Williams 68 (88); MV Fleming 3/41 (9 overs) |

West Indies won by 1 wicket
Kensington Oval, Bridgetown, Barbados
Umpires: BEW Morgan and EA Nicholls
Player of the match: NV Knight (ENG)

- West Indies won the toss and elected to field.

=== 3rd ODI ===
4 April 1998
Scorecard

| England; 209/8 (50 overs) | v | West Indies; 213/5 (48.1 overs) |
| GA Hick 45 (85); KLT Arthurton 2/31 (8 overs) | | CL Hooper 50 (73); RDB Croft 1/18 (10 overs) |

West Indies won by 5 wickets
Arnos Vale Stadium, Kingstown, St. Vincent and the Grenadines
Umpires: SA Bucknor and BR Doctrove
Player of the match: CL Hooper (WI)

- England won the toss and elected to bat.

=== 4th ODI ===
5 April 1998
Scorecard

| England; 149 (48.5 overs) | v | West Indies; 150/6 (37.4 overs) |
| AJ Hollioake 23 (39); M Dillon 3/32 (10 overs) | | CB Lambert 52 (62); RDB Croft 2/41 (9 overs) |

West Indies won by 4 wickets
Arnos Vale Stadium, Kingstown, St. Vincent and the Grenadines
Umpires: SA Bucknor and BR Doctrove
Player of the match: BC Lara (WI)

- England won the toss and elected to bat.

=== 5th ODI ===
8 April 1998
Scorecard

| West Indies; 302/5 (50 overs) | v | England; 245 (45.5 overs) |
| CB Lambert 119 (124); BC Hollioake 2/43 (10 overs) | | NV Knight 65 (67); CL Hooper 2/6 (2 overs) |

West Indies won by 57 runs
Queen's Park Oval, Port of Spain, Trinidad and Tobago
Umpires: Z Maccum and EA Nicholls
Player of the match: CB Lambert (WI)

- West Indies won the toss and elected to bat.
- NC McGarrell and CM Tuckett (both WI) made their ODI debuts.

== External sources ==
CricketArchive

- Playfair Cricket Annual
- Wisden Cricketers Almanack (annual)
