= 2000 Cable & Wireless ODI Series =

- Date: 1 April 2000 – 23 April 2000
- Location: West Indies
- Result: Won by Pakistan; 2–1 in final series
- Player of the series: Inzamam-ul-Haq (Pak)
Teams
West Indies	Pakistan	Zimbabwe
Captains
Jimmy Adams	Moin Khan	Andy Flower
Most runs
Sherwin Campbell (316)	Inzamam-ul-Haq (295)	Stuart Carlisle (129)
Most wickets
Reon King (17)	Abdur Razzaq (10)	Gary Brent (4)

The 2000 Cable & Wireless ODI Series was a One Day International (ODI) cricket where West Indies played host to Pakistan and Zimbabwe. Pakistan and West Indies reached the Finals, which Pakistan won 2–1.

== Squads ==
West Indies	Pakistan	Zimbabwe
Jimmy Adams (c); Curtly Ambrose; Sherwin Campbell; Shivnarine Chanderpaul; Mervyn Dillon; Chris Gayle; Wavell Hinds; Ridley Jacobs; Reon King; Nehemiah Perry; Ricardo Powell; Franklyn Rose; Philo Wallace; Laurie Williams	Moin Khan (c); Shahid Afridi; Mushtaq Ahmed; Shoaib Akhtar; Mohammad Akram; Wasim Akram; Naved Ashraf; Inzamam-ul-Haq; Arshad Khan; Younis Khan; Imran Nazir; Abdur Razzaq; Mohammad Wasim; Wajahatullah Wasti; Mohammad Yousuf; Waqar Younis; Atiq-uz-Zaman	Andy Flower (c); Heath Streak (vc); Andy Blignaut; Gary Brent; Alistair Campbell; Stuart Carlisle; Grant Flower; Murray Goodwin; Neil Johnson; Brian Murphy; Mluleki Nkala; Henry Olonga; Tatenda Taibu; Dirk Viljoen; Guy Whittall; Craig Wishart

== Point table ==
Pos	Team	P	W	L	NR	T	NRR	Points
1	West Indies	4	4	0	0	0	8	+1.205
2	Pakistan	4	2	2	0	0	4	−0.364
3	Zimbabwe	4	0	4	0	0	0	−0.884

== Group matches ==
=== 1st match ===
1 April 2000
Scorecard

West Indies; 237/9 (50 overs)	v	Zimbabwe; 150 (41.4 overs)
SL Campbell 103 (130); GB Brent 2/49 (10 overs)		MW Goodwin 52 (57); JC Adams 2/49 (10 overs)

West Indies won by 87 runs
Sabina Park, Kingston, Jamaica
Umpires: SA Bucknor (WI) and BEW Morgan (WI)
Player of the match: SL Campbell (WI)

- Zimbabwe won the toss and elected to field.
- Zimbabwe's innings was limited to 48 overs due to their slow over rate.

=== 2nd match ===
2 April 2000
Scorecard

West Indies; 280/3 (50 overs)	v	Zimbabwe; 239/8 (50 overs)
WW Hinds 116* (125); GB Brent 2/34 (8 overs)		SV Carlisle 57 (70); RD King 3/27 (8 overs)

West Indies won by 41 runs
Sabina Park, Kingston, Jamaica
Umpires: SA Bucknor (WI) and BEW Morgan (WI)
Player of the match: WW Hinds (WI)

- West Indies won the toss and elected to bat.

=== 3rd match ===
5 April 2000
Scorecard

Zimbabwe; 199/9 (50 overs)	v	Pakistan; 200/5 (47.1 overs)
GW Flower 36 (52); Mohammad Akram 2/31 (8 overs)		Shahid Afridi 69 (69); DP Viljoen 2/30 (10 overs)

Pakistan won by 5 wickets
Antigua Recreation Ground, St John's, Antigua and Barbuda
Umpires: BR Doctrove (WI) and EA Nicholls (WI)
Player of the match: Shahid Afridi (PAK)

- Zimbabwe won the toss and elected to bat.
- BA Murphy (ZIM) made his ODI debut.

=== 4th match ===
12 April 2000
Scorecard

West Indies; 213/7 (50 overs)	v	Pakistan; 117 (41.3 overs)
JC Adams 50 (87); Abdur Razzaq 2/30 (9 overs)		Inzamam-ul-Haq 51* (95); FA Rose 5/23 (10 overs)

West Indies won by 96 runs
Arnos Vale Stadium, Kingstown, St. Vincent
Umpires: SA Bucknor (WI) and BEW Morgan (WI)
Player of the match: FA Rose (WI)

- West Indies won the toss and elected to bat.

=== 5th match ===
15 April 2000
Scorecard

Zimbabwe; 204/7 (50 overs)	v	Pakistan; 205/4 (43.1 overs)
CB Wishart 45 (69); Arshad Khan 3/45 (10 overs)		Imran Nazir 105* (135); GJ Whittall 1/22 (5 overs)

Pakistan won by 6 wickets
Queen's Park, St. George's, Grenada
Umpires: SA Bucknor (WI) and BEW Morgan (WI)
Player of the match: Imran Nazir (PAK)

- Zimbabwe won the toss and elected to bat.

=== 6th match ===
16 April 2000
Scorecard

West Indies; 248/6 (50 overs)	v	Pakistan; 231 (48.1 overs)
SL Campbell 56 (89); Mushtaq Ahmed 1/33 (10 overs)		Inzamam-ul-Haq 69 (96); RD King 3/38 (10 overs)

West Indies won by 17 runs
Queen's Park, St. George's, Grenada
Umpires: SA Bucknor (WI) and BEW Morgan (WI)
Player of the match: RD King (WI)

- West Indies won the toss and elected to bat.
- Pakistan's innings was limited to 49 overs due to their slow over rate.
- Irfan Fazil (PAK) made his ODI debut.

== Final series ==
Pakistan won the best of three final series against West Indies 2–1.

=== 1st final ===
19 April 2000
Scorecard

Pakistan; 197/8 (50 overs)	v	West Indies; 180 (49.3 overs)
Inzamam-ul-Haq 66 (86); RD King 2/37 (10 overs)		PA Wallace 47 (91); Shahid Afridi 3/16 (3.3 overs)

Pakistan won by 17 runs
Kensington Oval, Bridgetown, Barbados
Umpires: BR Doctrove (WI) and EA Nicholls (WI)
Player of the match: Wasim Akram (PAK)

- Pakistan won the toss and elected to bat.
- SC Joseph (WI) made his ODI debut.

=== 2nd final ===
22 April 2000
Scorecard

West Indies; 208/8 (50 overs)	v	Pakistan; 148 (45 overs)
SL Campbell 77 (127); Wasim Akram 3/34 (10 overs)		Younis Khan 31 (51); JC Adams 3/21 (10 overs)

West Indies won by 60 runs
Queen's Park Oval, Port of Spain, Trinidad and Tobago
Umpires: BR Doctrove (WI) and EA Nicholls (WI)
Player of the match: SL Campbell (WI)

- West Indies won the toss and elected to bat.

=== 3rd final ===
23 April 2000
Scorecard

West Indies; 114 (33.2 overs)	v	Pakistan; 116/6 (45.1 overs)
PA Wallace 30 (64); Mushtaq Ahmed 4/22 (8 overs)		Inzamam-ul-Haq 39* (98); RD King 4/25 (10 overs)

Pakistan won by 4 wickets
Queen's Park Oval, Port of Spain, Trinidad and Tobago
Umpires: BR Doctrove (WI) and EA Nicholls (WI)
Player of the match: Mushtaq Ahmed (PAK)

- West Indies won the toss and elected to bat.
- Curtly Ambrose played his final ODI game.
