= List of international cricket five-wicket hauls by Glenn McGrath =

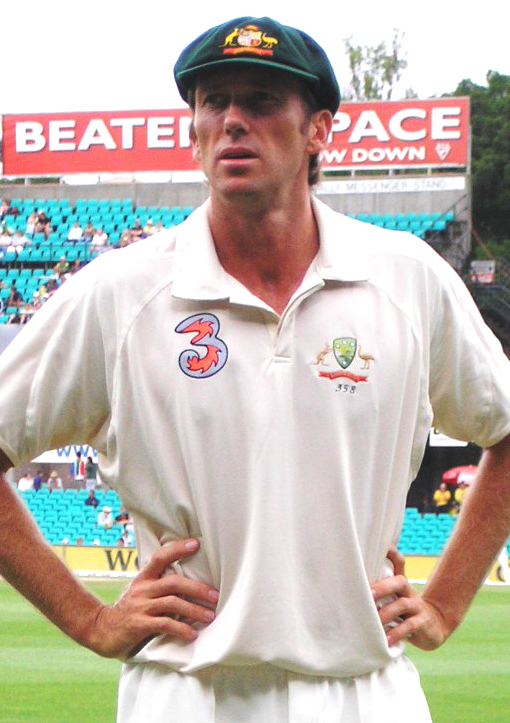
Glenn McGrath

Glenn McGrath, a retired international Australian cricketer, took a number of five-wicket hauls during his career. In cricket, a five-wicket haul (also known as a "five–for" or "fifer") refers to a bowler taking five or more wickets in a single innings. This is regarded as a notable achievement, as of October 2024, only 54 bowlers have taken 15 or more five-wicket hauls at international level in their cricketing careers.

McGrath made his Test debut in November 1993, against New Zealand, but it was not until March 1995 that he took his first five-wicket haul in Australia's victory over the West Indies in Barbados; his performance earned him the man of the match award. He followed that three weeks later with six wickets in a defeat in Trinidad. McGrath took 10 of his 29 Test five-wicket hauls in The Ashes (the traditional name for Test matches between Australia and England). During the 1997 Ashes series, McGrath "humiliated" England, taking eight wickets in a single innings at Lord's and restricting England to 77, the lowest total in any Test match at the ground since 1888. A month later, he dismissed seven English batsmen in the first innings at The Oval but despite these performances, Australia did not win either Test match. The 2001 Ashes series saw McGrath make four five-wicket hauls in consecutive matches. He twice took five-wicket hauls in both innings of a Test match – in March 1999 he dismissed five West Indian batsmen in each innings of the first Test of the Frank Worrell Trophy; in the following year, he took ten wickets against India at the Sydney Cricket Ground.

Having made his One Day International (ODI) debut in December 1993, McGrath took his first one-day five-wicket haul in the following year, in the final of the Will's Triangular Series against Pakistan. Australia won each of the seven ODI matches in which McGrath took a five-wicket haul, and McGrath was given the man of the match award on six of these occasions. Retiring from international cricket in 2007, he took 29 five-wicket hauls in Test cricket and 7 in ODIs. As of October 2009, he is fifth overall in all-time Test five-wicket haul takers, and fourth in the ODI list.

== Key ==
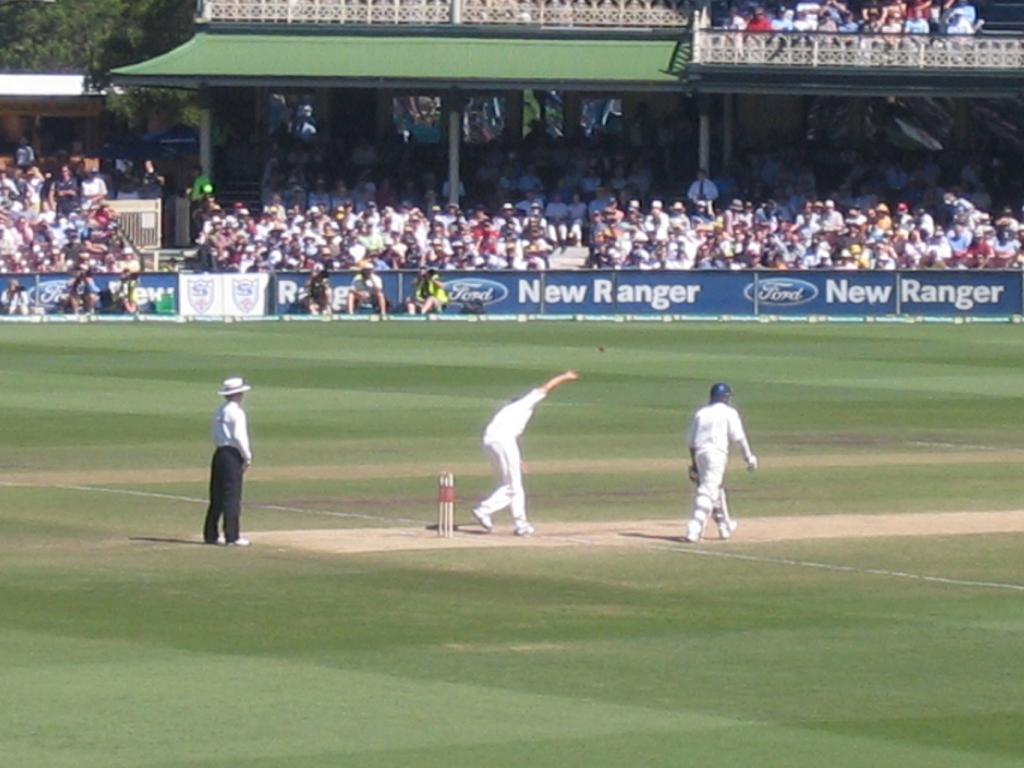
McGrath bowling at the Sydney Cricket Ground during the 2007 Ashes

Symbol	Meaning
Date	Day the Test started or ODI held
Inn	The innings of the match in which the five-wicket haul was taken
Overs	Number of overs bowled in that innings
Runs	Number of Runs conceded
Wkts	Number of wickets taken
Batsmen	The batsmen whose wickets were taken in the five-wicket haul
Econ	Bowling economy rate (average runs per over)
Result	Result for the Australia team
*	One of two five-wicket hauls by McGrath in a match
†	10 wickets or more taken in the match
‡	McGrath was selected as man of the match

== Tests ==
No.	Date	Ground	Against	Inn	Overs	Runs	Wkts	Econ	Batsmen	Result
1	31 March 1995 ‡	Kensington Oval, Bridgetown, Barbados	West Indies	4	22.0	68	5	3.09	Stuart Williams; Brian Lara; Winston Benjamin; Curtly Ambrose; Courtney Walsh	Won
2	21 April 1995	Queen's Park Oval, Port of Spain, Trinidad	West Indies	2	21.5	47	6	2.15	Richie Richardson; Brian Lara; Keith Arthurton; Junior Murray; Curtly Ambrose; Courtney Walsh	Lost
3	17 November 1995	Bellerive Oval, Hobart	Pakistan	4	24.3	61	5	2.48	Saleem Elahi; Moin Khan; Wasim Akram; Mushtaq Ahmed; Waqar Younis	Won
4	26 December 1995 ‡	Melbourne Cricket Ground, Melbourne	Sri Lanka	2	23.4	40	5	1.69	Roshan Mahanama; Chandika Hathurusingha; Aravinda de Silva; Pramodya Wickramasinghe; Muttiah Muralitharan	Won
5	26 December 1996	Melbourne Cricket Ground, Melbourne	West Indies	2	30	50	5	1.66	Sherwin Campbell; Shivnarine Chanderpaul; Brian Lara; Junior Murray; Ian Bishop	Lost
6	21 March 1997	Centurion Park, Gauteng Province, South Africa	South Africa	2	40.4	86	6	2.11	Gary Kirsten; Adam Bacher; Daryll Cullinan; Jacques Kallis; Dave Richardson; Brett Schultz	Lost
7	19 June 1997 ‡	Lord's Cricket Ground, London	England	1	20.3	38	8	1.85	Mark Butcher; Michael Atherton; Alec Stewart; Nasser Hussain; John Crawley; Robert Croft; Darren Gough; Andy Caddick	Draw
8	21 August 1997	Kennington Oval, London	England	1	21	76	7	3.61	Mark Butcher; Michael Atherton; Alec Stewart; Nasser Hussain; Graham Thorpe; Mark Ramprakash; Peter Martin	Lost
9	7 November 1997	Brisbane Cricket Ground, Brisbane	New Zealand	4	17	32	5	1.88	Bryan Young; Nathan Astle; Stephen Fleming; Craig McMillan; Simon Doull	Won
10	22 October 1998	National Stadium, Karachi	Pakistan	2	25	66	5	2.64	Shahid Afridi; Ijaz Ahmed; Inzamam ul Haq; Moin Khan; Shakeel Ahmed	Draw
11	20 November 1998 ‡	Brisbane Cricket Ground, Brisbane	England	2	34.2	85	6	2.47	Mark Butcher; Graham Thorpe; Dominic Cork; Darren Gough; Alan Mullally; Angus Fraser	Draw
12	5 March 1999 * † ‡	Queen's Park Oval, Port of Spain, Trinidad	West Indies	2	14	50	5	3.57	Sherwin Campbell; Dave Joseph; Pedro Collins; Curtly Ambrose; Mervyn Dillon	Won
13	5 March 1999 * † ‡	Queen's Park Oval, Port of Spain, Trinidad	West Indies	4	10	28	5	2.80	Dave Joseph; Jimmy Adams; Ridley Jacobs; Roland Holder; Curtly Ambrose	Won
14	13 March 1999	Sabina Park, Kingston, Jamaica	West Indies	2	35	93	5	2.65	Sherwin Campbell; Lincoln Roberts; Brian Lara; Dave Joseph; Jimmy Adams	Lost
15	26 March 1999	Kensington Oval, Bridgetown, Barbados	West Indies	4	44	92	5	2.09	Sherwin Campbell; Pedro Collins; Jimmy Adams; Ridley Jacobs; Nehemiah Perry	Lost
16	2 January 2000 * † ‡	Sydney Cricket Ground, Sydney	India	1	18.5	48	5	2.54	Mannava Prasad; Rahul Dravid; Sachin Tendulkar; Anil Kumble; Javagal Srinath	Won
17	2 January 2000 * † ‡	Sydney Cricket Ground, Sydney	India	3	17	55	5	3.23	Mannava Prasad; Rahul Dravid; Sourav Ganguly; Anil Kumble; Ajit Agarkar	Won
18	23 November 2000 † ‡	Brisbane Cricket Ground, Brisbane	West Indies	1	20	17	6	0.85	Brian Lara; Shivnarine Chanderpaul; Ridley Jacobs; Mervyn Dillon; Marlon Black	Won
19	19 July 2001	Lord's Cricket Ground, London	England	1	24	54	5	2.25	Michael Atherton; Mark Butcher; Graham Thorpe; Alec Stewart; Craig White	Won
20	2 August 2001	Trent Bridge, Nottingham	England	1	18	49	5	2.72	Michael Atherton; Mark Butcher; Alec Stewart; Ian Ward; Craig White	Won
21	16 August 2001	Headingley, Leeds	England	2	30.2	76	7	2.50	Michael Atherton; Marcus Trescothick; Nasser Hussain; Usman Afzaal; Alex Tudor; Darren Gough; Alan Mullally	Lost
22	23 August 2001	Kennington Oval, London	England	3	15.3	43	5	2.77	Michael Atherton; Marcus Trescothick; Usman Afzaal; Jimmy Ormond; Phil Tufnell	Won
23	22 February 2002	New Wanderers Stadium, Johannesburg	South Africa	3	12.3	21	5	1.68	Jacques Kallis; Nicky Boje; Makhaya Ntini; André Nel; Allan Donald	Won
24	1 July 2004 ‡	Marrara Oval, Darwin	Sri Lanka	2	15	37	5	2.46	Marvan Atapattu; Sanath Jayasuriya; Nuwan Zoysa; Thilan Samaraweera; Russel Arnold	Won
25	16 December 2004	Western Australia Cricket Association Ground, Perth	Pakistan	4	16	24	8	1.50	Salman Butt; Imran Farhat; Younis Khan; Yousuf Youhana; Abdul Razzaq; Inzamam ul Haq; Kamran Akmal; Shoaib Akhtar	Won
26	10 March 2005	Jade Stadium, Christchurch	New Zealand	1	42	115	6	2.73	Nathan Astle; Craig McMillan; Brendon McCullum; James Franklin; Iain O'Brien; Chris Martin	Won
27	21 July 2005 ‡	Lord's Cricket Ground, London	England	2	18	53	5	2.94	Marcus Trescothick; Andrew Strauss; Michael Vaughan; Ian Bell; Andrew Flintoff	Won
28	11 August 2005	Old Trafford, Manchester	England	3	20.5	115	5	5.52	Marcus Trescothick; Andrew Strauss; Kevin Pietersen; Ian Bell; Andrew Flintoff	Draw
29	23 November 2006	Brisbane Cricket Ground, Brisbane	England	2	23.1	50	6	2.15	Andrew Strauss; Alastair Cook; Kevin Pietersen; Geraint Jones; Ashley Giles; James Anderson	Won

== One Day Internationals ==
No.	Date	Ground	Against	Inn	Overs	Runs	Wkts	Econ	Batsmen	Result
1	30 October 1994 ‡	Gaddafi Stadium, Lahore	Pakistan	2	10	52	5	5.20	Inzamam ul Haq; Ijaz Ahmed; Basit Ali; Wasim Akram; Waqar Younis	Won
2	24 January 1999 ‡	Adelaide Oval, Adelaide	Sri Lanka	2	10	40	5	4.00	Sanath Jayasuriya; Romesh Kaluwitharana; Marvan Atapattu; Hashan Tillakaratne; Arjuna Ranatunga	Won
3	30 May 1999 ‡	Old Trafford, Manchester	West Indies	1	8.4	14	5	1.61	Sherwin Campbell; Jimmy Adams; Brian Lara; Mervyn Dillon; Courtney Walsh	Won
4	4 February 2000	Sydney Cricket Ground, Sydney	Pakistan	2	9.3	49	5	5.15	Saeed Anwar; Ijaz Ahmed; Moin Khan; Wasim Akram; Saqlain Mushtaq	Won
5	15 September 2002 ‡	Sinhalese Sports Club Ground, Colombo	New Zealand	2	7	37	5	5.28	Stephen Fleming; Mathew Sinclair; Lou Vincent; Scott Styris; Jacob Oram	Won
6	27 February 2003 ‡	North West Cricket Stadium, Potchefstroom	Namibia	2	7	15	7	2.14	Andries Burger; Morne Karg; Danie Keulder; Gavin Murgatroyd; Deon Kotze; Louis Burger; Bjorn Kotze	Won
7	6 February 2005 ‡	Sydney Cricket Ground, Sydney	Pakistan	2	7.4	27	5	3.52	Kamran Akmal; Mohammad Hafeez; Inzamam ul Haq; Abdul Razzaq; Naved-ul-Hasan	Won
