= List of international cricket five-wicket hauls by Anil Kumble =

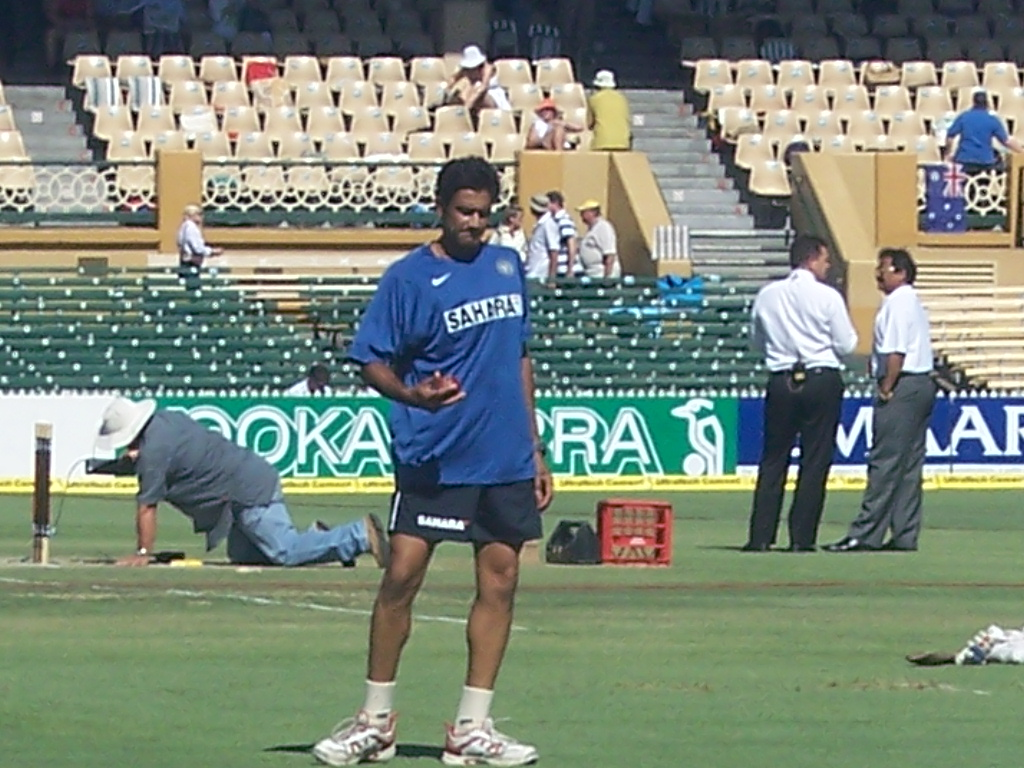
Anil Kumble, India's leading wicket-taker in Tests and ODIs

In cricket, a five-wicket haul (also known as a "five–for" or "fifer") refers to a bowler taking five or more wickets in a single innings. This is regarded as a notable achievement, as of October 2024 only 54 bowlers have taken 15 or more five-wicket hauls at an international level in their cricketing careers. Anil Kumble is a former Test and One Day International (ODI) cricketer who represented India. He is a right-arm leg spin (legbreak googly) bowler. Kumble has taken 619 wickets in Test cricket and 337 wickets in ODI cricket. With 37 five-wicket hauls, Kumble has the highest number of Test and combined international five-wicket hauls among Indian cricketers and fourth highest among all players, after Muttiah Muralitharan, Richard Hadlee, and Shane Warne.

Kumble made his ODI debut against Sri Lanka and his Test debut against England, both in 1990. His first five-wicket haul was against South Africa at Johannesburg (November 1992) in the second Test of India's tour. He has claimed the most of his five-wicket hauls against Australia, ten of them, all in Test matches. His best performance was against Pakistan at the Feroz Shah Kotla in 1999; Kumble took all ten wickets during the second innings, just the second person to do so, after Jim Laker, and in the process ensured India of their first Test victory against Pakistan in twenty years. The feat also ranks as the second-best bowling figure in Test history. Twenty of Kumble's Test cricket five-wicket hauls have come in victory for India, while five have been in defeats. Kumble has also taken two five-wicket hauls in ODIs. His first ODI five-wicket haul was against the West Indies during the final of the 1993 Hero Cup at Eden Gardens, Calcutta when he took six wickets for twelve runs, a record for India in One Day Internationals. The performance ensured India's victory and Kumble was adjudged man of the match. His other ODI five-wicket haul was against New Zealand at the Basin Reserve in 1994.

== Key ==
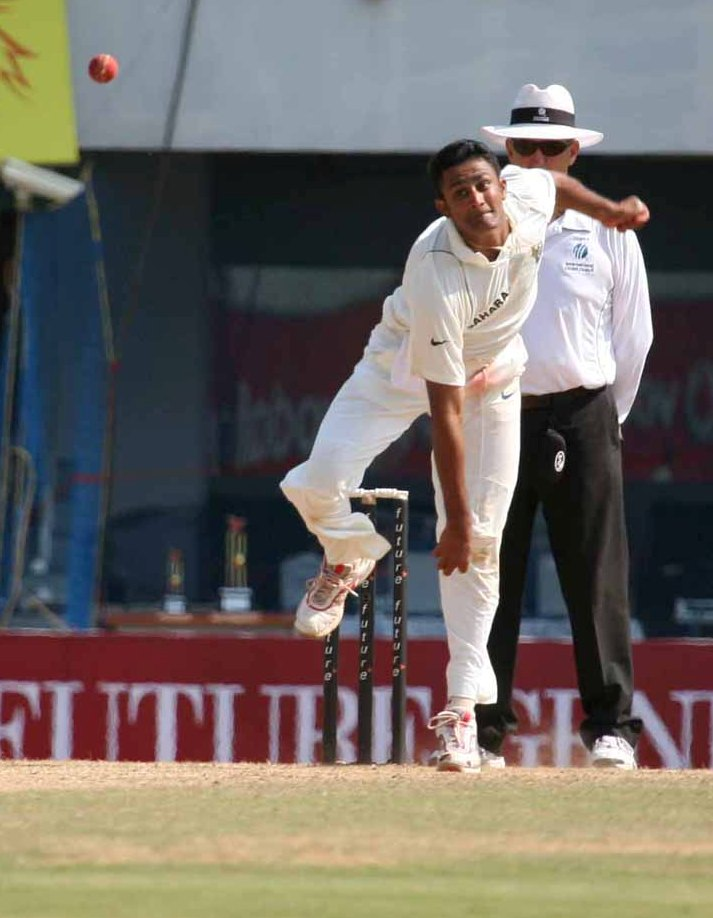
Anil Kumble bowling in a Test match

| Symbol | Meaning |
|---|---|
| Date | Day the Test started or ODI held |
| Inn | Innings in which five-wicket haul was taken |
| Overs | Number of overs bowled |
| Runs | Number of runs conceded |
| Wkts | Number of wickets taken |
| Econ | Runs conceded per over |
| Batsmen | Batsmen whose wickets were taken |
| Result | Result for the India team |
| * | One of two five-wicket hauls by Kumble in the match |
| † | 10 or more wickets taken in the match |
| ‡ | Kumble was selected as man of the match |

== Tests ==
Five-wicket hauls in Test cricket
| No. | Date | Ground | Against | Inn | Overs | Runs | Wkts | Econ | Batsmen | Result |
|---|---|---|---|---|---|---|---|---|---|---|
| 1 | 26 November 1992 | New Wanderers Stadium, Johannesburg | South Africa | 3 | 44 | 53 | 6 | 1.20 | Andrew Hudson; Dave Richardson; Peter Kirsten; Jonty Rhodes; Hansie Cronje; Brian McMillan | Draw |
| 2 | 11 February 1993 | M. A. Chidambaram Stadium, Madras (Note: Madras has since been renamed as Chennai.) | England | 3 | 21 | 64 | 6 | 3.04 | Robin Smith; Neil Fairbrother; Richard Blakey; Chris Lewis; Ian Salisbury; Paul Jarvis | Won |
| 3 | 13 March 1993 | Arun Jaitley stadium, Delhi | Zimbabwe | 3 | 38.5 | 70 | 5 | 1.80 | Alistair Campbell; Dave Houghton; Ali Shah; David Brain; John Traicos | Won |
| 4 | 27 July 1993 | Sinhalese Sports Club, Colombo | Sri Lanka | 2 | 24 | 87 | 5 | 3.62 | Chandika Hathurusingha; Aravinda de Silva; Arjuna Ranatunga; Ashley de Silva; Dulip Liyanage | Won |
| 5 | 18 January 1994 † ‡ | K. D. Singh Babu Stadium, Lucknow | Sri Lanka | 3 | 27.3 | 59 | 7 | 2.14 | Roshan Mahanama; Dulip Samaraweera; Hashan Tillakaratne; Aravinda de Silva; Arjuna Ranatunga; Don Anurasiri; Muttiah Muralitharan | Won |
| 6 | 18 October 1995 | Chinnaswamy Stadium, Bangalore | New Zealand | 3 | 27.2 | 81 | 5 | 2.96 | Martin Crowe; Stephen Fleming; Shane Thomson; Lee Germon; Danny Morrison | Won |
| 7 | 10 October 1996 | Feroz Shah Kotla, Delhi | Australia | 3 | 41 | 67 | 5 | 1.63 | Mark Waugh; Michael Bevan; Ian Healy; Brad Hogg; Paul Reiffel | Won |
| 8 | 6 March 1997 | Sabina Park, Kingston | West Indies | 1 | 42.4 | 120 | 5 | 2.81 | Ian Bishop; Roland Holder; Junior Murray; Curtly Ambrose; Courtney Walsh | Draw |
| 9 | 14 March 1997 | Queen's Park Oval, Port of Spain | West Indies | 1 | 39 | 104 | 5 | 2.66 | Sherwin Campbell; Stuart Williams; Carl Hooper; Junior Murray; Curtly Ambrose | Draw |
| 10 | 18 March 1998 | Eden Gardens, Calcutta (Note: Calcutta has since been renamed as Kolkata.) | Australia | 3 | 31 | 62 | 5 | 2.00 | Mark Waugh; Ricky Ponting; Steve Waugh; Shane Warne; Gavin Robertson | Won |
| 11 | 25 March 1998 | Chinnaswamy Stadium, Bangalore | Australia | 2 | 41.3 | 98 | 6 | 2.36 | Mark Taylor; Ricky Ponting; Ian Healy; Gavin Robertson; Michael Kasprowicz; Adam Dale | Lost |
| 12 | 28 January 1999 | M. A. Chidambaram Stadium, Chennai | Pakistan | 1 | 24.5 | 70 | 6 | 2.81 | Ijaz Ahmed; Inzamam-ul-Haq; Moin Khan; Wasim Akram; Saqlain Mushtaq; Nadeem Khan | Lost |
| 13 | 4 February 1999 † ‡ | Feroz Shah Kotla, Delhi | Pakistan | 4 | 26.3 | 74 | 10 | 2.79 | Saeed Anwar; Shahid Afridi; Ijaz Ahmed; Inzamam-ul-Haq; Yousuf Youhana; Moin Khan; Saleem Malik; Wasim Akram; Mushtaq Ahmed; Saqlain Mushtaq | Won |
| 14 | 22 October 1999 † ‡ | Green Park Stadium, Kanpur | New Zealand | 3 | 26.5 | 67 | 6 | 2.49 | Matt Horne; Matthew Bell; Dion Nash; Nathan Astle; Craig McMillan; Paul Wiseman | Won |
| 15 | 29 October 1999 | Sardar Patel Stadium, Ahmedabad | New Zealand | 2 | 48 | 82 | 5 | 1.70 | Gary Stead; Matt Horne; Daniel Vettori; Adam Parore; Chris Cairns | Draw |
| 16 | 2 March 2000 | Chinnaswamy Stadium, Bangalore | South Africa | 2 | 68.4 | 143 | 6 | 2.08 | Gary Kirsten; Herschelle Gibbs; Nicky Boje; Jacques Kallis; Daryll Cullinan; Allan Donald | Lost |
| 17 | 3 December 2001 | Punjab Cricket Association Stadium, Mohali | England | 3 | 28.4 | 81 | 6 | 2.82 | Nasser Hussain; Graham Thorpe; Mark Ramprakash; Andrew Flintoff; Jimmy Ormond; Richard Dawson | Won |
| 18 | 11 December 2001 † | Sardar Patel Stadium, Ahmedabad | England | 1 | 51 | 115 | 7 | 2.25 | Mark Butcher; Marcus Trescothick; Nasser Hussain; Michael Vaughan; Andrew Flintoff; James Foster; Ashley Giles | Draw |
| 19 | 21 February 2002 ‡ | Vidarbha Cricket Association Ground, Nagpur | Zimbabwe | 3 | 37 | 63 | 5 | 1.70 | Alistair Campbell; Andy Flower; Gavin Rennie; Grant Flower; Heath Streak | Won |
| 20 | 17 October 2002 | M. A. Chidambaram Stadium, Chennai | West Indies | 1 | 23.3 | 30 | 5 | 1.27 | Wavell Hinds; Shivnarine Chanderpaul; Ryan Hinds; Mervyn Dillon; Jermaine Lawson | Won |
| 21 | 12 December 2003 | Adelaide Oval, Adelaide | Australia | 1 | 43 | 154 | 5 | 3.58 | Justin Langer; Ricky Ponting; Andy Bichel; Brad Williams; Stuart MacGill | Won |
| 22 | 26 December 2003 | Melbourne Cricket Ground, Melbourne | Australia | 2 | 51 | 176 | 6 | 3.45 | Matthew Hayden; Ricky Ponting; Adam Gilchrist; Steve Waugh; Simon Katich; Brett Lee | Lost |
| 23 | 2 January 2004 † | Sydney Cricket Ground, Sydney | Australia | 2 | 46.5 | 141 | 8 | 3.01 | Justin Langer; Matthew Hayden; Ricky Ponting; Damien Martyn; Simon Katich; Brett Lee; Jason Gillespie; Nathan Bracken | Draw |
| 24 | 28 March 2004 | Multan Cricket Stadium, Multan | Pakistan | 3 | 30 | 72 | 6 | 2.40 | Imran Farhat; Taufeeq Umar; Abdul Razzaq; Mohammad Sami; Saqlain Mushtaq; Shoaib Akhtar | Won |
| 25 | 14 October 2004 * † ‡ | M. A. Chidambaram Stadium, Chennai | Australia | 1 | 17.3 | 48 | 7 | 2.74 | Damien Martyn; Darren Lehmann; Michael Clarke; Adam Gilchrist; Shane Warne; Jason Gillespie; Michael Kasprowicz | Draw |
| 26 | 14 October 2004 * † ‡ | M. A. Chidambaram Stadium, Chennai | Australia | 3 | 47 | 133 | 6 | 2.82 | Justin Langer; Matthew Hayden; Adam Gilchrist; Darren Lehmann; Shane Warne; Michael Kasprowicz | Draw |
| 27 | 3 November 2004 | Wankhede Stadium, Mumbai | Australia | 2 | 19 | 90 | 5 | 4.73 | Ricky Ponting; Simon Katich; Michael Clarke; Jason Gillespie; Nathan Hauritz | Won |
| 28 | 3 November 2004 | Green Park Stadium, Kanpur | South Africa | 1 | 54 | 131 | 6 | 2.42 | Graeme Smith; Andrew Hall; Martin van Jaarsveld; Jacques Kallis; Jacques Rudolph; Thami Tsolekile | Draw |
| 29 | 16 March 2005 † | Eden Gardens, Kolkata | Pakistan | 4 | 38 | 63 | 7 | 1.65 | Shahid Afridi; Younis Khan; Inzamam-ul-Haq; Yousuf Youhana; Asim Kamal; Abdul Razzaq; Mohammad Sami | Won |
| 30 | 10 December 2005 † ‡ | Feroz Shah Kotla, Delhi | Sri Lanka | 2 | 28 | 72 | 6 | 2.57 | Marvan Atapattu; Mahela Jayawardene; Thilan Samaraweera; Malinga Bandara; Tillakaratne Dilshan; Chaminda Vaas | Won |
| 31 | 18 December 2005 | Feroz Shah Kotla, Delhi | Sri Lanka | 4 | 34.3 | 89 | 5 | 2.57 | Upul Tharanga; Kumar Sangakkara; Thilan Samaraweera; Farveez Maharoof; Malinga Bandara | Won |
| 32 | 9 March 2006 | Punjab Cricket Association Stadium, Mohali | England | 1 | 29.4 | 76 | 5 | 2.56 | Ian Bell; Paul Collingwood; Geraint Jones; Steve Harmison; Monty Panesar | Won |
| 33 | 30 June 2006 | Sabina Park, Kingston | West Indies | 4 | 22.4 | 78 | 6 | 3.44 | Shivnarine Chanderpaul; Dwayne Bravo; Marlon Samuels; Jerome Taylor; Pedro Collins; Corey Collymore | Won |
| 34 | 8 December 2007 | Chinnaswamy Stadium, Bangalore | Pakistan | 4 | 14 | 60 | 5 | 4.28 | Salman Butt; Yasir Hameed; Younis Khan; Faisal Iqbal; Kamran Akmal | Draw |
| 35 | 26 December 2007 | Melbourne Cricket Ground, Melbourne | Australia | 1 | 25 | 84 | 5 | 3.36 | Phil Jaques; Mike Hussey; Andrew Symonds; Adam Gilchrist; Brett Lee | Lost |

== One Day Internationals ==
Five-wicket hauls in One Day Internationals
| No. | Date | Ground | Against | Inn | Overs | Runs | Wkts | Econ | Batsmen | Result |
|---|---|---|---|---|---|---|---|---|---|---|
| 1 | 27 November 1993 ‡ | Eden Gardens, Calcutta | West Indies | 2 | 6.1 | 12 | 6 | 1.94 | Carl Hooper; Roland Holder; Jimmy Adams; Anderson Cummins; Winston Benjamin; Curtly Ambrose | Won |
| 2 | 30 March 1994 ‡ | Basin Reserve, Wellington | New Zealand | 2 | 10 | 33 | 5 | 3.30 | Chris Harris; Blair Hartland; Shane Thomson; Adam Parore; Dion Nash | Won |
