= South African cricket team in the West Indies in 2000–01 =

	South Africa	West Indies
- Dates: 4 March – 16 May 2001
Captains	Shaun Pollock	Carl Hooper

Test series
- Result: South Africa won the 5-match series 2–1
Most runs	Herschelle Gibbs (464)	Brian Lara (400)
Most wickets	Courtney Walsh (25)	Jacques Kallis (20); Shaun Pollock (20)

One Day International series
- Results: South Africa won the 7-match series 5–2
Most runs	Jacques Kallis (298)	Brian Lara (274)
Most wickets	Jacques Kallis (10)	Marlon Samuels (7); Cameron Cuffy (7)
- Player of the series: Shaun Pollock (SA)

The South Africa national cricket team toured the West Indies from March to May 2001 to play five Test matches and seven One Day Internationals (ODIs). South Africa won the Test series 2–1 and the ODI series 5–2.

== Tour matches ==
=== First-class: Busta Cup XI v South Africans ===
4–6 March 2001
Scorecard

South Africans	v	Busta Cup XI
271/9d (90 overs); Mark Boucher 56 (99); Ryan Hinds 3/48 (19 overs)		196 (50.5 overs); Daren Ganga 80 (112); Makhaya Ntini 4/31 (7.5 overs)
289/7d (77 overs); Lance Klusener 60 (69); Sulieman Benn 4/111 (25 overs)		155/4 (44 overs); Sherwin Campbell 86 (96); Lance Klusener 2/5 (8 overs)

Match drawn
Everest Cricket Club Ground, Georgetown, Guyana
Umpires: Clyde Duncan (WI) and John Hampshire (Eng)

- South Africans won the toss and elected to bat.

=== First-class: West Indies Board President's XI v South Africans ===
24–26 March 2001
Scorecard

South Africans	v	West Indies Board President's XI
270 (83.3 overs); Shaun Pollock 79 (117); Colin Stuart 4/57 (16.3 overs)		186 (77.5 overs); Ricardo Powell 47 (105); Nicky Boje 3/11 (12 overs)
143/2d (66 overs); Herschelle Gibbs 55 (133); Dave Mohammed 2/35 (16 overs)		84/1 (34 overs); Daren Ganga 33* (90); André Nel 1/27 (9 overs)

Match drawn
Kensington Oval, Bridgetown, Barbados
Umpires: Vincent Bullen (WI) and Dalton Holder (WI)

- South Africans won the toss and elected to bat.

=== 50-over: University of West Indies Vice-Chancellor's XI v South Africans ===
12 April 2001
Scorecard

UWI Vice-Chancellor's XI; 218 (47.5 overs)	v	South Africans; 222/6 (48 overs)
Shivnarine Chanderpaul 70; Justin Kemp 3/35 (8 overs)		Boeta Dippenaar 52; Ian Bradshaw 2/36 (9 overs)

South Africans won by 4 wickets
Salem Oval, Montserrat
Umpires: E Hinds (WI) and Basil Morgan (WI)

- South Africans won the toss and elected to field.

=== Two-day: Jamaica v South Africans ===
15–16 April 2001
Scorecard

South Africans	v	Jamaica
199/9d (71.2 overs); Lance Klusener 41 (85); Audley Sanson 3/28 (16.2 overs)		380/6 (96 overs); Leon Garrick 174* (279); Allan Donald 2/42 (12 overs)

Match drawn
Jarrett Park, Montego Bay, Jamaica
Umpires: Cecil Fletcher (WI) and Melvin Noble (WI)

- South Africans won the toss and elected to bat.

=== 50-over: Jamaica v South Africans ===
25 April 2001
Scorecard

Jamaica; 185 (46.4 overs)	v	South Africa; 189/4 (45.4 overs)
David Bernard 59 (89); Lance Klusener 5/23 (10 overs)		Herschelle Gibbs 54 (72); Wavell Hinds 1/14 (3 overs)

South Africans won by 6 wickets
Sabina Park, Kingston, Jamaica
Umpires: Norman Malcolm (WI) and Thomas Wilson (WI)

- South Africans won the toss and elected to field.

== Sir Vivian Richards Trophy (Test series) ==
=== 1st Test ===
9–13 March 2001
Scorecard

West Indies	v	South Africa
304 (124.1 overs); Chris Gayle 81 (159); Allan Donald 2/43 (23 overs)		332 (127 overs); Gary Kirsten 150 (338); Mervyn Dillon 3/64 (27 overs)
333/7d (117 overs); Ramnaresh Sarwan 91 (181); Nicky Boje 3/93 (37 overs)		142/2 (69.3 overs); Herschelle Gibbs 83* (215); Nixon McLean 1/25 (10 overs)

Match drawn
Bourda, Georgetown, Guyana
Umpires: John Hampshire (Eng) and Eddie Nicholls (WI)
Player of the match: Gary Kirsten (SA)

- West Indies won the toss and elected to bat.

=== 2nd Test ===
17–21 March 2001
Scorecard

South Africa	v	West Indies
286 (86.5 overs); Daryll Cullinan 103 (155); Dinanath Ramnarine 3/57 (18 overs)		342 (125 overs); Ridley Jacobs 93* (177); Allan Donald 4/91 (30 overs)
287 (130.4 overs); Herschelle Gibbs 87 (275); Courtney Walsh 6/61 (36.4 overs)		162 (80.1 overs); Carl Hooper 54* (172); Jacques Kallis 4/40 (16 overs)

South Africa won by 69 runs
Queen's Park Oval, Port of Spain, Trinidad
Umpires: Billy Doctrove (WI) and Darrell Hair (Aus)
Player of the match: Daryll Cullinan (SA)

- South Africa won the toss and elected to bat.
- Courtney Walsh (WI) took his 500th wicket and became the first bowler to take 500 wickets in Tests.

=== 3rd Test ===
29 March–2 April 2001
Scorecard

South Africa	v	West Indies
454 (173.1 overs); Daryll Cullinan 134 (272); Mervyn Dillon 4/147 (34 overs)		387 (151 overs); Ridley Jacobs 113* (215); Jacques Kallis 6/67 (36 overs)
197/9d (95.5 overs); Daryll Cullinan 82 (238); Dinanath Ramnarine 5/78 (31.5 overs)		88/7 (38.4 overs); Chris Gayle 48 (39); Nicky Boje 4/17 (16.4 overs)

Match drawn
Kensington Oval, Bridgetown, Barbados
Umpires: Steve Bucknor (WI) and Darrell Hair (Aus)
Player of the match: Daryll Cullinan (SA)

- West Indies won the toss and elected to field.

=== 4th Test ===
6–10 April 2001
Scorecard

South Africa	v	West Indies
247 (122.2 overs); Herschelle Gibbs 85 (188); Neil McGarrell 4/72 (43 overs)		140 (76.1 overs); Shivnarine Chanderpaul 40 (122); Lance Klusener 3/15 (11 overs)
215/7d (123 overs); Herschelle Gibbs 45 (195); Courtney Walsh 4/56 (38 overs)		240 (99.4 overs); Brian Lara 91 (199); Nicky Boje 4/118 (45 overs)

South Africa won by 82 runs
Antigua Recreation Ground, St. John's, Antigua
Umpires: Eddie Nicholls (WI) and Srinivasaraghavan Venkataraghavan (Ind)
Player of the match: Shaun Pollock (SA)

- West Indies won the toss and elected to field.
- Neil McGarrell (WI) made his Test debut.

=== 5th Test ===
19–23 April 2001
Scorecard

West Indies	v	South Africa
225 (96.5 overs); Brian Lara 81 (156); Shaun Pollock 5/28 (26.5 overs)		141 (61.1 overs); Neil McKenzie 45 (99); Mervyn Dillon 4/32 (15.1 overs)
301 (129.5 overs); Ridley Jacobs 85 (191); Shaun Pollock 4/66 (34 overs)		255 (110 overs); Neil McKenzie 55 (216); Mervyn Dillon 3/59 (19 overs)

West Indies won by 130 runs
Sabina Park, Kingston, Jamaica
Umpires: Steve Bucknor (WI) and Srinivasaraghavan Venkataraghavan (Ind)
Player of the match: Ridley Jacobs (WI)

- West Indies won the toss and elected to bat.
- Leon Garrick (WI) made his Test debut.
- Courtney Walsh (WI) played his last international match.

== ODI series ==
=== 1st ODI ===
28 April 2001
Scorecard

South Africa; 200 (47.4 overs)	v	West Indies; 202/7 (50 overs)
Gary Kirsten 38 (63); Neil McGarrell 3/32 (10 overs)		Brian Lara 54 (97); Jacques Kallis 2/34 (10 overs)

West Indies won by 3 wickets
Sabina Park, Kingston, Jamaica
Umpires: Steve Bucknor (WI) and Basil Morgan (WI)
Player of the match: Neil McGarrell (WI)

- West Indies won the toss and elected to field.
- Justin Ontong (SA) and Leon Garrick (WI) made their ODI debuts.

=== 2nd ODI ===
2 May 2001
Scorecard

West Indies; 220/8 (50 overs)	v	South Africa; 221/2 (45.5 overs)
Shivnarine Chanderpaul 60 (54); Lance Klusener 2/28 (5 overs)		Herschelle Gibbs 104 (141); Cameron Cuffy 1/27 (10 overs)

South Africa won by 8 wickets
Antigua Recreation Ground, St. John's, Antigua
Umpires: Clancy Mack (WI) and Basil Morgan (WI)
Player of the match: Herschelle Gibbs (SA)

- South Africa won the toss and elected to field.

=== 3rd ODI ===
5 May 2001
Scorecard

South Africa; 287/4 (50 overs)	v	West Indies; 155 (39 overs)
Jacques Kallis 107 (108); Chris Gayle 1/32 (5 overs)		Brian Lara 31 (39); Shaun Pollock 3/23 (6 overs)

South Africa won by 132 runs
Queen's Park, St. George's, Grenada
Umpires: Basil Morgan (WI) and Eddie Nicholls (WI)
Player of the match: Jacques Kallis (SA)

- West Indies won the toss and elected to field.

=== 4th ODI ===
6 May 2001
Scorecard

West Indies; 200 (49.3 overs)	v	South Africa; 201/2 (46.1 overs)
Marlon Samuels 65 (71); Allan Donald 4/38 (9.3 overs)		Gary Kirsten 72 (104); Kerry Jeremy 1/18 (4 overs)

South Africa won by 8 wickets
Queen's Park, St. George's, Grenada
Umpires: Glenroy T. Johnson (WI) and Eddie Nicholls (WI)
Player of the match: Allan Donald (SA)

- South Africa won the toss and elected to field.

=== 5th ODI ===
9 May 2001
Scorecard

West Indies; 199 (49.2 overs)	v	South Africa; 202/3 (41.4 overs)
Brian Lara 92 (125); Jacques Kallis 4/22 (6.2 overs)		Herschelle Gibbs 107 (132); Marlon Samuels 1/37 (10 overs)

South Africa won by 7 wickets
Kensington Oval, Bridgetown, Barbados
Umpires: Billy Doctrove (WI) and Eddie Nicholls (WI)
Player of the match: Herschelle Gibbs (SA)

- South Africa won the toss and elected to field.

=== 6th ODI ===
12 May 2001
Scorecard

South Africa; 190 (49.5 overs)	v	West Indies; 137 (47 overs)
Neil McKenzie 73 (117); Marlon Samuels 2/14 (5 overs)		Brian Lara 41 (63); André Nel 3/20 (8.1 overs)

South Africa won by 53 runs
Queen's Park Oval, Port of Spain, Trinidad
Umpires: Steve Bucknor (WI) and Clyde Duncan (WI)
Player of the match: Neil McKenzie (SA)

- West Indies won the toss and elected to field.
- André Nel (SA) made his ODI debut.

=== 7th ODI ===
16 May 2001
Scorecard

South Africa; 163/7 (50 overs)	v	West Indies; 164/4 (44.2 overs)
Jacques Kallis 69 (147); Cameron Cuffy 3/24 (10 overs)		Marlon Samuels 54* (91); Justin Kemp 2/16 (6 overs)

West Indies won by 6 wickets
Arnos Vale Stadium, Kingstown, Saint Vincent
Umpires: Steve Bucknor (WI) and Billy Doctrove (WI)
Player of the match: Cameron Cuffy (WI)

- South Africa won the toss and elected to bat.
