= West Indian cricket team in New Zealand in 1999–2000 =

	West Indies	New Zealand
- Dates: December 3, 1999 – January 11, 2000
Captains	Brian Lara	Stephen Fleming

Test series
- Result: New Zealand won the 2-match series 2–0
Most runs	Adrian Griffith (244)	Mathew Sinclair (214)
Most wickets	Reon King (8)	Chris Cairns (17)

One Day International series
- Results: New Zealand won the 5-match series 5–0
Most runs	Sherwin Campbell (152)	Nathan Astle (320)
Most wickets	Reon King (8)	Daniel Vettori (9)

The West Indies cricket team toured New Zealand between December 1999 and January 2000, playing two Test matches and five One Day International (ODI) games.

Warm-up games preceded the Test series. The West Indies played against the New Zealand Max Blacks on December 3, losing the game. They then faced New Zealand 'A' on December 5, and Auckland on December 10, with both matches drawn. The first Test match began on December 16, with the West Indies following their first innings score of 365 - featuring centuries by openers Adrian Griffith and Sherwin Campbell - with 97 all out thanks to a seven-wicket haul by Chris Cairns. Former West Indian fast-bowler criticised the West Indian performance as "second rate." Cairns finished the two-Test series with 17 wickets at a bowling average of 9.94.

New Zealand proceeded to reach 518 in the first innings of the second Test with Mathew Sinclair scoring a double-century, and the West Indies batted twice for 179 and 243, losing by an innings and 105 runs. The home team went on to win the ODI series 5:0. The first match was rain-affected, with New Zealand taking a three-wicket victory on Duckworth Lewis. Victory margins of seven wickets, four wickets, eight wickets and twenty runs followed in the remaining four games. Nathan Astle scored 320 across the series, with four half-centuries, while Daniel Vettori took nine wickets.

== Test series summary ==
=== First Test ===
16–20 December 1999
(5-day match)
Scorecard

West Indies	v	New Zealand
365 (135.1 overs); SL Campbell 170 (262); DL Vettori 4/83 (34.1 overs)		393 (130.2 overs); CL Cairns 72 (82); RD King 4/81 (26.2 overs)
97 (53.5 overs); RL Powell 30 (32); CL Cairns 7/27 (7 overs)		70/1 (15 overs); CM Spearman 30* (36); CA Walsh 1/33 (8 overs)

New Zealand won by 9 wickets
Seddon Park, Hamilton
Umpires: DB Cowie (NZ) and DR Shepherd (ENG)
Player of the match: CL Cairns (NZ)

- West Indies won the toss and elected to bat.
- RL Powell (WI) made his Test debut.

=== Second Test ===
26–29 December 1999
(5-day match)
Scorecard

New Zealand	v	West Indies
518/9d (173.3 overs); MS Sinclair 214 (447); RD King 4/96 (36 overs)		179 (91 overs); AFG Griffith 67 (253); BC Lara 67 (145); CL Cairns 5/44 (19 overs)
		234 (f/o) (83.1 overs); BC Lara 75 (140); DJ Nash 4/38 (16 overs)

New Zealand won by an innings and 105 runs
Basin Reserve, Wellington
Umpires: RB Tiffin (ZIM) and EA Watkin (NZ)
Player of the match: MS Sinclair (NZ)

- West Indies won the toss and elected to field.
- The match was scheduled for five days but completed in four.
- MS Sinclair (NZ) made his Test debut.

== One Day Internationals (ODIs) ==
=== 1st ODI ===
2 January 2000
Scorecard

West Indies; 268/7 (49.1 overs)	v	New Zealand; 250/7 (45.1 overs)
BC Lara 76 (81); SB O'Connor 2/62 (8 overs)		NJ Astle 77 (101); RD King 3/24 (8.1 overs)

New Zealand won by 3 wickets (D/L method)
Eden Park, Auckland
Umpires: BF Bowden and DM Quested
Player of the match: NJ Astle (NZ)

- West Indies won the toss and elected to bat.
- New Zealand target was revised to 250 from 46 overs.

=== 2nd ODI ===
4 January 2000 (D/N)
Scorecard

West Indies; 192 (41.3 overs)	v	New Zealand; 194/3 (35.4 overs)
JC Adams 69 (92); DL Vettori 4/24 (8 overs)		SP Fleming 59* (88); JC Adams 1/29 (3.4 overs)

New Zealand won by 7 wickets
Owen Delany Park, Taupō
Umpires: RS Dunne and DM Quested
Player of the match: DL Vettori (NZ)

- New Zealand won the toss and elected to field.
- The match was reduced before play started to 43 overs per side.

=== 3rd ODI ===
6 January 2000 (D/N)
Scorecard

West Indies; 159 (49.5 overs)	v	New Zealand; 160/6 (37.2 overs)
NO Perry 52* (90); CL Cairns 3/25 (8 overs)		SP Fleming 66* (100); RD King 3/35 (10 overs)

New Zealand won by 4 wickets
McLean Park, Napier
Umpires: DB Cowie and EA Watkin
Player of the match: SP Fleming (NZ)

- West Indies won the toss and elected to bat.

=== 4th ODI ===
8, 9 January 2000
Scorecard

West Indies; 171/9 (50 overs)	v	New Zealand; 172/2 (36.3 overs)
SL Campbell 30 (73); SB Styris 3/37 (10 overs)		NJ Astle 76* (99); RD King 1/20 (6 overs)

New Zealand won by 8 wickets
WestpacTrust Stadium, Wellington
Umpires: RS Dunne and EA Watkin
Player of the match: CZ Harris (NZ)

- New Zealand won the toss and elected to field.
- The match was scheduled for one day but extended to two. West Indies were 43/1 (10.5 overs) at the close of the first day's play.

=== 5th ODI ===
11 January 2000 (D/N)
Scorecard

New Zealand; 302/6 (50 overs)	v	West Indies; 282 (49.5 overs)
RG Twose 97 (90); SL Campbell 2/46 (7 overs)		SL Campbell 71 (87); SB Styris 4/57 (9.5 overs)

New Zealand won by 20 runs
Jade Stadium, Christchurch
Umpires: AL Hill and EA Watkin
Player of the match: RG Twose (NZ)

- New Zealand won the toss and elected to bat.
- Courtney Walsh played his last ODI game.
