= West Indian cricket team in Pakistan in 1997–98 =

International cricket tour

The West Indian national cricket team toured Pakistan from October to December 1997 and played a three-match Test series against the Pakistani national cricket team. Pakistan won the Test series 3–0. West Indies were captained by Courtney Walsh and Pakistan by Wasim Akram. In addition, the teams played in an international Limited Overs Internationals (LOI) which was won by South Africa.

== Test series summary ==
=== 1st Test ===
17–20 November 1997
(5-day match)
Scorecard

| West Indies | v | Pakistan |
| 151 (60.3 overs); D Williams 31 (77); Mushtaq Ahmed 5/35 (18.3 overs) | | 381 (132 overs); Inzamam-ul-Haq 92 (191); CA Walsh 5/78 (32 overs) |
| 211 (70.2 overs); SL Campbell 66 (170); Mushtaq Ahmed 5/71 (23 overs) |

Pakistan won by an innings and 19 runs
Arbab Niaz Stadium, Peshawar
Umpires: Said Shah (PAK) and DR Shepherd (ENG)
Player of the match: Mushtaq Ahmed (PAK)

- West Indies won the toss and elected to bat.
- The match was scheduled for five days but completed in four.
- Arshad Khan (PAK) and RN Lewis (WI) made their Test debuts.

=== 2nd Test ===
29 November–3 December 1997
(5-day match)
Scorecard

| West Indies | v | Pakistan |
| 303 (101.5 overs); S Chanderpaul 95 (154); Azhar Mahmood 4/53 (20.5 overs) | | 471 (136.1 overs); Inzamam-ul-Haq 177 (320); CA Walsh 5/143 (43.1 overs) |
| 139 (41 overs); CL Hooper 73* (94); Wasim Akram 4/42 (14 overs) |

Pakistan won by an innings and 29 runs
Rawalpindi Cricket Stadium, Rawalpindi
Umpires: Javed Akhtar (PAK) and DR Shepherd (ENG)
Player of the match: Inzamam-ul-Haq (PAK)

- Pakistan won the toss and elected to field.
- Shoaib Akhtar (PAK) and PA Wallace (WIN) made their Test debuts.

=== 3rd Test ===
6–9 December 1997
(5-day match)
Scorecard

| West Indies | v | Pakistan |
| 216 (73.1 overs); SL Campbell 50 (117); Saqlain Mushtaq 5/54 (24 overs) | | 417 (118.4 overs); Aamer Sohail 160 (255); M Dillon 5/111 (29.4 overs) |
| 212 (52.4 overs); CL Hooper 106 (90); Saqlain Mushtaq 4/26 (19 overs) | | 15/0 (5 overs); Azhar Mahmood 13* (20) |

Pakistan won by 10 wickets
National Stadium, Karachi
Umpires: CJ Mitchley (SA) and Saleem Badar (PAK)
Player of the match: Saqlain Mushtaq (PAK)

- West Indies won the toss and elected to bat.
- The match was scheduled for five days but completed in four.
