= Sir Vivian Richards Trophy =

- Countries: South Africa; West Indies
- Administrator: Cricket South Africa; Cricket West Indies
- Format: Test cricket
- First edition: 1998
- Latest edition: 2022–23
- Tournament format: Test Series
- Number of teams: 2
- Current trophy holder: South Africa
- Most successful: South Africa (9 titles)
- Most runs: (South Africa) Jacques Kallis (2356)
- Most wickets: (South Africa) Shaun Pollock (70)

The Sir Vivian Richards Trophy is a cricket trophy that is awarded to the winner of Test series between South Africa and West Indies. While the two sides first played each other in a Test series in the 1991/92 season, a one-match series in which the West Indians emerged the winners, the series between the two sides was only named starting with the 1998/99 West Indian tour of South Africa, a five-match series won by the hosts 5-0. The Trophy has since been contested another eight times, and South Africa has emerged the winner and retained the Trophy each time.

== Results ==
Year	Host	Winning team
1998-99	South Africa	South Africa
2000-01	West Indies	South Africa
2003-04	South Africa	South Africa
2004-05	West Indies	South Africa
2007-08	South Africa	South Africa
2010	West Indies	South Africa
2014-15	South Africa	South Africa
2021	West Indies	South Africa
2022–23	South Africa	South Africa

Total Series	South Africa	West Indies	Drawn
9	9	0	0

== List of Test series ==
Series	Years	Host	Tests	South Africa	West Indies	Drawn	Result	Holder	Player of the series
1	1998-99	South Africa	5	5	0	0	South Africa	South Africa	(South Africa) Jacques Kallis
2	2000-01	West Indies	5	2	1	2	South Africa	South Africa	(South Africa) Shaun Pollock
3	2003-04	South Africa	4	3	0	1	South Africa	South Africa	(South Africa) Makhaya Ntini
4	2004-05	West Indies	4	2	0	2	South Africa	South Africa	(South Africa) Graeme Smith
5	2007-08	South Africa	3	2	1	0	South Africa	South Africa	(South Africa) Dale Steyn
6	2010	West Indies	3	2	0	1	South Africa	South Africa	(South Africa) Dale Steyn
7	2014-15	South Africa	3	2	0	1	South Africa	South Africa	(South Africa) Hashim Amla
8	2021	West Indies	2	2	0	0	South Africa	South Africa	(South Africa) Quinton de Kock
9	2022–23	South Africa	2	2	0	0	South Africa	South Africa	(South Africa) Aiden Markram
Total			31	22	2	7			

Total Series	South Africa	West Indies	Drawn
9	9	0	0

== See also ==
- Gandhi–Mandela Trophy
- Clive Lloyd Trophy
- Frank Worrell Trophy
- Tangiwai Shield
- Sobers–Tissera Trophy
