= Australian cricket team in India in 1997–98 =

1997–98 Border–Gavaskar Trophy
- Date: 24 February – 14 April 1998
- Location: India
- Result: India won the 3-match series 2–1
- Player of the series: (India) Sachin Tendulkar
Teams
- Australia: India
Captains
- Mark Taylor: Mohammad Azharuddin
Most runs
- Mark Waugh (280): Sachin Tendulkar (446)
Most wickets
- Gavin Robertson (12): Anil Kumble (23)

The Australian cricket team toured India from February to April 1998 for a three Test series and an ODI tri-series featuring Australia, India and Zimbabwe.

== Background ==
Entering the 1997–98 tour of India, Australia had not won a series in that country since Bill Lawry's team recorded a 3–1 series win in 1969–70.

When the Australian squad was announced only 8 of the touring party of 15 had played a Test match in India previously including only two of the bowlers, Paul Reiffel and Shane Warne. Missing from the previous series against South Africa were Matthew Elliott, Andy Bichel, Michael Bevan, (all dropped) and Glenn McGrath (injured).

Shane Warne caused something of a stir before the series began by stating that he was "not a fan of exotic cuisine", which prompted Qantas, the Australian national airline, to fly in 1,900 tins of baked beans and spaghetti for the team.

== Tour matches ==
=== Three-day: Mumbai v Australians ===
24–26 February 1998
Scorecard

Australians	v	Mumbai
305/8d (89.5 overs); Michael Slater 98 (162); Rajesh Pawar 3/59 (20.5 overs)		410/6d (78.1 overs); Sachin Tendulkar 204* (192); Paul Wilson 2/46 (13 overs)
135 (41.5 overs); Greg Blewett 50 (102); Nilesh Kulkarni 5/23 (13.5 overs)		31/0 (5.3 overs); Sulakshan Kulkarni 21* (18); Paul Wilson 0/11 (3 overs)

Mumbai won by 10 wickets
Brabourne Stadium, Mumbai
Umpires: S. K. Bansal and Vijay Chopra

- Australians won the toss and elected to field.
- Michael Slater (Australians) passed 8,000 runs in first-class cricket.

=== Three-day: Indian Board President's XI v Australians ===
1–3 March 1998
Scorecard

Indian Board President's XI	v	Australians
329/4d (124.5 overs); Hrishikesh Kanitkar 102* (229); Shane Warne 2/88 (26 overs)		567/8 (138 overs); Michael Slater 207 (236); Abey Kuruvilla 3/105 (18 overs)

Match drawn
Municipal Corporation Vizag Stadium, Visakhapatnam
Umpires: Jasbir Singh and Chandra Sathe

- Indian Board President's XI won the toss and elected to bat.

=== Three-day: India A v Australians ===
13–15 March 1998
Scorecard

India A	v	Australians
216/9d (86.5 overs); Jacob Martin 45 (154); Stuart MacGill 4/67 (30 overs)		391 (96.2 overs); Steve Waugh 107 (167); K. N. Ananthapadmanabhan 3/71 (17 overs)
241/2 (44 overs); Amay Khurasiya 117* (106); Stuart MacGill 2/77 (16 overs)

Match drawn
Keenan Stadium, Jamshedpur
Umpires: Jasbir Singh and K. Parthasarathy

- India A won the toss and elected to bat.

== Test series ==
=== First Test ===
6–10 March 1998
Scorecard

India	v	Australia
257 (104.2 overs); Navjot Sidhu 62 (133); Gavin Robertson 4/72 (28.2 overs)		328 (130.3 overs); Ian Healy 90 (194); Anil Kumble 4/103 (45 overs)
418/4d (107 overs); Sachin Tendulkar 155 (191); Greg Blewett 1/35 (10 overs)		168 (67.5 overs); Shane Warne 35 (52); Anil Kumble 4/46 (22.5 overs)

India won by 179 runs
MA Chidambaram Stadium, Chennai
Umpires: George Sharp and Srinivas Venkataraghavan
Player of the match: Sachin Tendulkar (Ind)

- India won the toss and elected to bat.
- Australian Test debut: Gavin Robertson
- Indian test debut: Harvinder Singh

The Indian openers started the first innings at a steady pace and put on a hundred run opening stand before Mongia was caught at the wicket on 58 in the 43rd over when the score had reached 122. A mini-collapse followed with Sidhu, run out for 62 and Tendulkar falling quickly with India then finding themselves at 130/3. Dravid was resolute with a patient 52 from 169 balls, but of the rest of the batsmen only Azharuddin with 26 and Kumble with 30 reached double figures. The last five wickets fell for the addition of only 10 runs. Shane Warne and Gavin Robertson shared the bowling honours for the visitors with 4 wickets each.

Australia began its run-chase slowly and lost a steady stream of wickets with only Mark Waugh of the top-order batsmen making more than 50. When Warne fell in the 80th over Australia were 201/8, and it appeared that the first innings scores would be close. However, Healy's 90 and Robertson's 57 on debut pushed the score to a total of 328, from 130.3 overs, a lead of 71 on the first innings. Kumble was the pick of the bowlers with 4/103.

India erased Australia's lead for the loss of only Mongia. When Sidhu departed with India effectively 2–44 Australia had a hope of dismissing India for a low score and pushing for a win. But Dravid was joined by Tendulkar and the pair added 113 for the 3rd wicket. This was followed by 127 for the 4th wicket partnership between Tendulkar and Azharuddin, and then another 63 for the 5th between Tendulkar and Ganguly. Azharuddin declared the innings closed at 418/4 with 15 overs left to be played on the 4th day.

Australia was set a target of 348 to win in the fourth innings of the match from approximately 107 overs. This was the same target required by India in the Tied Test at the same ground in 1986.

Australia started badly and lost Slater, Blewett and Taylor cheaply to end day 4 at 31/3, still needing 317 runs to win with 7 wickets in hand. On the 5th day Australia, offered little resistance and only Steve Waugh, Healey and Warne passed 20. Australia were eventually dismissed for 168, giving India a win in the first Test by 179 runs. Kumble again took 4 wickets in the innings to be by far the best bowler in the match.

=== Second Test ===
18–22 March 1998
Scorecard

Australia	v	India
233 (89.4 overs); Steve Waugh 80 (175); Sourav Ganguly 3/28 (13.4 overs)		633/5d (159 overs); Mohammad Azharuddin 163* (246); Gavin Robertson 2/163 (33 overs)
181 (88.4 overs); Mark Taylor 45 (116); Anil Kumble 5/62 (31 overs)

India won by an innings and 219 runs
Eden Gardens, Calcutta
Umpires: B.C. Cooray and K Parthasarathy
Player of the match: Javagal Srinath (Ind)

- Australia won the toss and elected to bat.
- Australian Test debut: Paul Wilson

Australia were in trouble from the start of their innings with Srinath taking two wickets in the opening over of the Test, only the second such instance (prev. SJ Snooke, South Africa v England at Cape Town, 1909–10). With the dismissal of Mark Taylor in the 10th over Australia found themselves at 29/4. Steve Waugh with 80, and Ricky Ponting with 60 helped restore some respectability to the score although Australia were dismissed just before stumps on the first day for 233.

India then proceeded to dominate the Australian attack for 159 overs, scoring at close to 4 runs per over. All top six batsmen scored more than sixty although Mohammad Azharuddin was the only one to pass a hundred; he remained 163 not out when he declared India's innings closed at 633/5, their highest ever score against Australia.

In reply Australia's batsmen struggled against Anil Kumble and with only five of them reaching double figures Australia was dismissed for 181 runs in 88.4 overs. Kumble finished the innings with five wickets, taking his series total to 16 in the two matches played. India's win, by an innings and 219 runs, remains its best win ever against Australia and ranks 4th all-time in losses (by an innings) suffered by Australia.

=== Third Test ===
25–28 March 1998
Scorecard

India	v	Australia
424 (123.2 overs); Sachin Tendulkar 177 (207); Adam Dale 3/71 (23 overs)		400 (111.3 overs); Mark Waugh 153* (267); Anil Kumble 6/98 (41.3 overs)
169 (61 overs); Navjot Sidhu 44 (62); Michael Kasprowicz 5/28 (18 overs)		195/2 (58 overs); Mark Taylor 102* (193); Sachin Tendulkar 1/41 (11.2 overs)

Australia won by 8 wickets
M Chinnaswamy Stadium, Bangalore
Umpires: V. K. Ramaswamy and David Shepherd
Player of the match: Michael Kasprowicz (Aus)

- India won the toss and elected to bat.
- Australian Test debuts: Darren Lehmann, Adam Dale
- Indian Test debut: Harbhajan Singh

Australia went into the Third test of the series with a number of injury concerns: Steve Waugh had not recovered from an injury sustained during the Second test and was replaced by Darren Lehmann in his first Test; Paul Reiffel and Paul Wilson had returned home so Adam Dale came into the attack. India's Javagal Srinath had a side strain and was unable to take his place. In addition, Rajesh Chauhan was omitted to be replaced by the 17-year-old Harbhajan Singh.

On a slow pitch India started steadily reaching 290/4 at the close of the first day's play, Sachin Tendulkar on 117 not out, his second century of the series. Shane Warne bowled better than he had all series and with his second wicket, bowling Rahul Dravid, his became the most successful Test spin bowler at that time, surpassing Lance Gibbs's record of 309 wickets. Tendulkar scored 177 for the hosts, and Dale and Warne each took 3 wickets as India finished at 424 from 123.2 overs.

Australia's innings was similar to India's, in that the progress was brisk (3.58 runs per over) and one player, Mark Waugh, stood out from the rest with 153 not out when the innings closed at 400 exactly. Michael Slater was out for 91, one of nine occasions in which he was dismissed in the "nervous nineties" in Test cricket.

At 92/2 in their second innings India appeared to be in relative control. However, they then proceeded to lose their last 8 wickets for only 77 runs, setting Australia a target of 194 runs for a consolation victory. Australia reached the required figure in 58 overs for the loss of only Slater and Greg Blewett. Mark Taylor timed his innings to perfection, reaching 102 not out at the end of the match.

== Test squads ==
(India)	Indian Test squad - Australian cricket team in India in 1997–98	(India)
1 MA Azharuddin* · 2 SR Tendulkar · 3 SC Ganguly · 4 R Dravid · 5 NS Sidhu · 6 VVS Laxman · 7 NR Mongia † · 8 A Kumble · 9 RK Chauhan · 10 SLV Raju · 11 HH Kanitkar · 12 J Srinath · 13 Harvinder Singh · 14 Sadagoppan Ramesh · 15 DS Mohanty ·

(Australia)	Australian Test squad - Australian cricket team in India in 1997–98	(Australia)
1 MA Taylor* · 2 SR Waugh · 3 GS Blewett · 4 MJ Slater · 5 ME Waugh · 6 DS Lehmann · 7 RT Ponting · 8 IA Healy † · 9 SK Warne · 10 SCG MacGill · 11 GR Robertson · 12 PR Reiffel · 13 AC Dale · 14 MS Kasprowicz · 15 P Wilson ·

Key: *=Captain, †=Wicket-keeper
