= Adrian Griffith (cricketer) =

Barbadian cricketer (born 1971)

Personal information
- Full name: Adrian Frank Gordon Griffith
- Born: 19 November 1971 (age 54); Holders Hill, Saint James, Barbados
- Batting: Left-handed
- Bowling: Right-arm medium

International information
- National side: West Indies
- Test debut: 25 January 1997 v Australia
- Last Test: 31 August 2000 v England
- ODI debut: 8 December 1996 v Australia
- Last ODI: 6 July 2000 v Zimbabwe

Domestic team information
- Years: Team
- 1992–2002: Barbados

Career statistics
Competition	Test	ODI	FC	LA
Matches	14	9	79	63
Runs scored	638	99	4,044	1,283
Batting average	24.53	14.14	29.95	21.74
100s/50s	1/4	0/0	7/20	0/6
Top score	114	47	186	66
Balls bowled	0	0	36	0
Wickets	–	–	0	–
Bowling average	–	–	–	–
5 wickets in innings	–	–	–	–
10 wickets in match	–	–	–	–
Best bowling	–	–	–	–
Catches/stumpings	5/–	5/–	59/–	24/–
- Source: Cricket Archive, 24 October 2010

Adrian Frank Gordon Griffith (born 19 November 1971) is a former West Indies cricketer, who played in 14 Test matches from 1996–97 to 2000.

A tall left-handed batsman, Griffith made his first and only Test hundred, against New Zealand at Hamilton in 1999–2000. His innings of 114 was made in a 276 run opening stand with Sherwin Campbell. He batted on each day of the Test, and in the process became only the sixth batsman in the history of Test cricket to do so.
