= Henderson Bryan =

Barbadian cricketer (born 1970)

Hendy Bryan
Personal information
- Full name: Henderson Ricardo Bryan
- Born: 17 March 1970 (age 56); Salmonds, Saint Lucy, Barbados
- Batting: Right-handed
- Bowling: Right-arm fast-medium

International information
- National side: West Indies
- ODI debut: 11 April 1999 v Australia
- Last ODI: 18 September 1999 v Pakistan

Domestic team information
- Years: Team
- 1994/05–2001/02: Barbados
- 1997/98: Griqualand West

Career statistics
Competition	ODI	FC	LA
Matches	15	42	46
Runs scored	43	1,059	212
Batting average	7.16	19.98	10.09
100s/50s	0/0	0/3	0/1
Top score	11	76*	57
Balls bowled	722	7,334	2,217
Wickets	12	147	60
Bowling average	43.16	24.26	26.31
5 wickets in innings	0	6	0
10 wickets in match	0	1	0
Best bowling	4/24	6/71	4/24
Catches/stumpings	4/–	19/–	16/–
- Source: Cricinfo, 25 October 2010

Henderson Ricardo Bryan (born 17 March 1970) is a former Barbadian cricketer, who played for West Indies as an all rounder in 15 One Day Internationals (ODIs).

== International career ==
On his ODI debut, he was dismissed for a 'duck' against Australia at Kingstown. However, he had his career best ODI figure of 10-1-24-4 in that match which earned him the Man of the Match Award. He represented West Indies in the 1999 Cricket World Cup.

== Domestic career ==
He also played domestic cricket for Barbados and Griqualand West.
