= Suruj Ragoonath =

West Indian cricketer (born 1968)

Personal information
- Full name: Suruj Ragoonath
- Born: 22 March 1968 (age 58); Chaguanas, Trinidad and Tobago
- Batting: Right-handed
- Bowling: Right-arm off break
- Role: Opening batsman

International information
- National side: West Indies
- Test debut (cap 227): 5 March 1999 v Australia
- Last Test: 13 March 1999 v Australia

Domestic team information
- Years: Team
- 1989–2001: Trinidad and Tobago

Career statistics
Competition	Test	FC	LA
Matches	2	66	48
Runs scored	13	3,261	1,045
Batting average	4.33	29.11	24.30
100s/50s	0/0	2/24	1/5
Top score	9	128	110*
Balls bowled	–	47	15
Wickets	–	0	0
Bowling average	–	–	–
5 wickets in innings	–	–	–
10 wickets in match	–	–	–
Best bowling	–	–	–
Catches/stumpings	0/–	36/–	8/–
- Source: ESPNcricinfo, 8 August 2015

Suruj Ragoonath (born 22 March 1968) is a former West Indies international cricketer.

An aggressive right-handed opening batsman, Ragoonath played domestically for Trinidad and Tobago between 1989 and 2001. He played in two Test matches in March 1999, both against Australia, but without success.

Ragoonath is currently chief executive officer of the Trinidad and Tobago Cricket Board. He has also been a policeman.
