= Zainool Maccum =

West Indian cricket umpire

Personal information
- Full name: Zainool Maccum

Umpiring information
- ODIs umpired: 1 (1998)
- Source: Cricinfo, 25 May 2014

Zainool Maccum is a West Indian former cricket umpire. He stood in one ODI game, in 1998.

== See also ==
- List of One Day International cricket umpires
