= Wavell Hinds =

Jamaican cricketer

Wavell Hinds MP

Member of the Jamaican Parliament for Clarendon Northern
- Incumbent
- Assumed office 3 September 2025
- Preceded by: Dwight Sibblies
- Majority: 5763 (50.87%)

Personal details
- Born: Wavell Wayne Hinds; Kingston, Jamaica 7 September 1976 (age 50)
- Party: People's National Party
- Cricket career

Cricket information
- Batting: Left-handed
- Bowling: Right-arm medium
- Role: Batsman

International information
- Test debut (cap [[List of {{{country}}} Test cricketers|233]]): 16 March 2000 v Zimbabwe
- Last Test: 25 November 2005 v Australia
- ODI debut (cap [[List of {{{country}}} ODI cricketers|95]]): 5 September 1999 v India
- Last ODI: 15 April 2010 v Ireland
- T20I debut (cap [[List of {{{country}}} Twenty20 International cricketers|7]]): 16 February 2006 v New Zealand
- Last T20I: 9 May 2010 v India

Domestic team information
- Years: Team
- 1996–2011: Jamaica
- 2008–2009: Derbyshire

Career statistics
| Competition | Test | ODI | T20I | FC |
|---|---|---|---|---|
| Matches | 45 | 119 | 5 | 175 |
| Runs scored | 2,608 | 2,880 | 30 | 10,110 |
| Batting average | 33.01 | 28.51 | 7.50 | 36.36 |
| 100s/50s | 5/14 | 5/14 | 0/0 | 23/51 |
| Top score | 213 | 127* | 14 | 213 |
| Balls bowled | 1,123 | 945 | – | 3,967 |
| Wickets | 16 | 28 | – | 50 |
| Bowling average | 36.87 | 29.89 | – | 37.44 |
| 5 wickets in innings | 0 | 0 | – | 0 |
| 10 wickets in match | 0 | 0 | – | 0 |
| Best bowling | 3/79 | 3/24 | – | 3/9 |
| Catches/stumpings | 32/– | 29/– | 1/– | 80/– |
Medal record
Men's Cricket
Representing West Indies
ICC Champions Trophy
| Winner | 2004 England |
| Runner-up | 2006 India |
- Source: ESPNcricinfo, 28 November 2016

Wavell Wayne Hinds (born 7 September 1976) is a Jamaican politician and former West Indian international cricketer. He was a left-handed batsman and occasional right-arm medium-pace bowler.

Hinds played 45 Test matches for the West Indies between 2000 and 2005, and 119 One Day Internationals between 1999 and 2010. He also played five Twenty20 Internationals between 2006 and 2010. He was a member of the West Indies team that won the 2004 ICC Champions Trophy. He was appointed president of the West Indies Players' Association (WIPA) in 2012.

== International career ==
On 17 March 2000 Hinds made his Test debut in the second test against Zimbabwe at the Queen's Park Oval, Port of Spain, Trinidad and Tobago. On 2 April 2000 Hinds scored his maiden ODI century, 116 not out, against the Zimbabweans in the second game of the 2000 Cable & Wireless ODI Series. On 19 May 2000 he notched his first Test Match century, 165 against Pakistan, in the second test at Barbados' Kensington Oval.

During the 5th test of the West Indies' 2000-01 tour of Australia, Hinds put on an opening stand of 147 with Sherwin Campbell. This became the highest opening partnership for the Windies in Australia, surpassing 135 notched by both Gordon Greenidge and Desmond Haynes in the 1988–89 season. For the next few years Hinds formed a notable opening pairing with Chris Gayle. In Tests they put on 1300 runs together at 39.39 in 33 innings. Their ODI opening partnership saw them compile 1687 runs in 41 matches at an average of 41.15 with four century and five 50 plus stands.

In 2003 he made successive ODI hundreds against Australia at Grenada, both unbeaten and both in victories for the West Indies.

He later picked up figures of 2 for 24 against Pakistan, with his medium pace, in the 2004 ICC Champions Trophy semi final and career best figures of 3 for 24 from 10 overs against England, in the final, which was eventually won by the Windies.

His highest Test score of 213 was made against South Africa at Georgetown in 2005 and included 34 fours and 2 sixes. He put on 284 for the 4th wicket with Shivnarine Chanderpaul who also made a double hundred making it one of the few occasions where two players have passed 200 in the same innings. Hinds however struggled soon after and again found himself on the sidelines. He made a brief return to the side in May for an ODI series against India but failed to impress and lost any chance he had of gaining inclusion in the World Cup squad.

== Domestic career ==
In October 2007, he signed a one-year contract to feature, in the 2008 season, as a Kolpak player for English county side Derbyshire.

He played in the Indian Cricket League for the Ahmedabad Rockets in the first half of 2008, although he did not return in season 2.

== Politics ==
Hinds is a member of the People's National Party (PNP). In March 2023 he announced his intention to stand as the PNP candidate for the Saint Ann South Eastern constituency being vacated by Lisa Hanna. He withdrew from the contest in June 2023 after placing second in an internal selection poll.

In July 2023, Hinds was appointed as a deputy general secretary of the PNP with responsibility for outreach and recruitment. He was named as the party's spokesman on labour and sports issues in January 2024.
