= Lincoln Roberts =

West Indian cricketer (born 1974)

Cricket information
- Batting: Right-handed
- Bowling: Right-arm medium

International information
- National side: West Indies
- Only Test: 13 March 1999 v Australia

Career statistics
Competition	Test	First-class
Matches	1	51
Runs scored	0	2,279
Batting average	0.00	27.13
100s/50s	0/0	5/8
Top score	0	220
Balls bowled	–	318
Wickets	–	3
Bowling average	–	50.66
5 wickets in innings	–	0
10 wickets in match	–	0
Best bowling	–	3/45
Catches/stumpings	0/–	24/–
- Source: ESPNcricinfo, 30 October 2022

Lincoln Roberts (born 4 September 1974) is a former cricketer who played one Test match for West Indies and 51 first class games for Trinidad and Tobago.

Roberts made his first class debut in 1996 after impressive one day form. It took until 1999 for him to score his maiden first class century, a month later he made his Test debut against Australia despite a first class average of 22. He made a seven ball duck, and took no wickets or catches in the match, but he did make history in becoming the first player from the island of Tobago to play Test cricket.

This was to be his only Test match but he continued to appear for Trinidad and Tobago on a regular basis. In 2003 despite averaging in the mid thirties he was released and his cricket career ended at the age of 29.
