= Adam Dale =

Australian cricketer (born 1968)

Personal information
- Born: 30 December 1968 (age 57); Ivanhoe, Victoria
- Batting: Left-handed
- Bowling: Right-arm medium

International information
- National side: Australia
- Test debut (cap 377): 25 March 1998 v India
- Last Test: 3 April 1999 v West Indies
- ODI debut (cap 132): 29 March 1997 v South Africa
- Last ODI: 9 January 2000 v Pakistan

Domestic team information
- Years: Team
- 1995/96–2002/03: Queensland

Career statistics
Competition	Test	ODI	FC	LA
Matches	2	30	59	65
Runs scored	6	78	888	165
Batting average	2.00	19.50	15.05	18.33
100s/50s	0/0	0/0	0/1	0/0
Top score	5	15*	55	25*
Balls bowled	348	1,596	14369	3497
Wickets	6	32	245	84
Bowling average	31.16	30.59	20.75	24.51
5 wickets in innings	0	0	13	1
10 wickets in match	0	0	1	0
Best bowling	3/71	3/18	7/24	5/28
Catches/stumpings	0/–	11/–	14/–	22/–
Medal record
Men's Cricket
Representing Australia
ICC Cricket World Cup
Winner	1999 England-Wales -Ireland-Scotland-Netherlands
- Source: CricInfo, 12 December 2005

Adam Craig Dale (born 30 December 1968) is an Australian former cricketer who played in two Test matches and 30 One Day Internationals between 1997 and 2000. He played in first-class and List A cricket for Queensland Bulls and in club cricket for North Melbourne Cricket Club, Heidelberg Cricket Club, Northcote Cricket Club, Old Paradians Cricket Club and Research Cricket Club. Dale was a part of the Australian team that won the 1999 Cricket World Cup.

From a short, ambling run-up, Dale delivered medium-paced outswingers with nagging accuracy. He therefore become known more as an economical bowler in one-day cricket, although he was selected for two Tests throughout his career and was very successful for Queensland in the first-class arena. He is best remembered however for taking one of the greatest catches ever seen in the game of cricket whilst playing for Queensland in the summer of 1997–98.

He played grade cricket for the Wynnum-Manly Cricket Club in Brisbane, and premier cricket for Northcote, Heidelberg Cricket Club, North Melbourne and Melbourne in Melbourne, over a long career which spanned twenty-six years from 1985–86 to 2010–11.
