= Reon King =

West Indian cricketer

Personal information
- Full name: Reon Dane King
- Born: 6 October 1975 (age 51); Good Fortune, West Coast, Demerara, Guyana
- Batting: Right-handed
- Bowling: Right-arm fast-medium

International information
- National side: West Indies (1998–2005)
- Test debut (cap 224): 15 January 1999 v South Africa
- Last Test: 3 June 2005 v Pakistan
- ODI debut (cap 89): 31 October 1998 v India
- Last ODI: 1 February 2005 v Pakistan

Career statistics
Competition	Test	ODI	FC	LA
Matches	19	50	95	125
Runs scored	66	65	444	129
Batting average	3.47	7.22	5.84	7.16
100s/50s	0/0	0/0	0/0	0/0
Top score	12*	12*	30	14*
Balls bowled	3,442	2,603	16,120	6,102
Wickets	53	76	293	170
Bowling average	32.69	23.77	27.48	25.66
5 wickets in innings	1	0	11	0
10 wickets in match	0	0	1	0
Best bowling	5/51	4/25	7/82	4/25
Catches/stumpings	2/–	4/–	16/–	14/–
- Source: ESPNcricinfo, 22 January 2024

Reon Dane King (born 6 October 1975) is a former West Indian cricketer. King played 19 Test matches and 50 One Day Internationals for the West Indies. He also appeared for Guyana, Northerns and Durham in his cricketing career.

Tall, athletic and with a slinky runup similar to Michael Holding's, he was arguably the Windies fastest bowler at the end of the 1990s.

== Personal life ==
He was born in Goed Fortuin, but grew up in Newtown Kitty. He attended St Joseph's High School where he was encouraged to join the GCC. King made his Under-19 debut for Guyana in the 1993 Northern Telecom Regional Youth Championship.

In 2007 he began coaching cricket. Later, he presumed the role of officiating as umpire and match referee in both men and women cricket.

He manages Genesis Fitness Gym, which is owned by his wife.

== International career ==
He enjoyed a successful home season in 1999–2000, taking his first Test five-for against Zimbabwe in Jamaica. Two months later, after setting up a tight win over Pakistan, he and Franklyn Rose seemed almost ready to succeed Curtly Ambrose and Courtney Walsh. But both fell away during the 2000 tour of England, where King was said to be troubled by a heel injury. An introverted character and a genuine No. 10, King was a forgotten man for four years, until he was recalled for the home series against South Africa in 2004–05, when a raft of leading players were sidelined by a contract dispute.

King was a strong performer in ODIs, rising to fourth in the ICC Rankings in 2000 and finishing with 76 wickets at 23.77. His remains the fourth lowest ODI bowling average by a West Indian after Joel Garner (18.84), Colin Croft (20.35) and Michael Holding (21.36).
