= Basil Morgan =

West Indian cricketer and umpire

Personal information
- Born: 13 May 1947 (age 79); Montserrat

Umpiring information
- ODIs umpired: 15 (1996–2001)
- Source: Cricinfo, 26 May 2014

Basil Elliott Walton Morgan (born 13 May 1947) is a West Indian former cricketer and umpire. He stood in fifteen One Day International (ODI) games between 1996 and 2001.

== See also ==
- List of One Day International cricket umpires
