= Roland Holder =

West Indian cricketer

Personal information
- Full name: Roland Irwin Christopher Holder
- Born: 22 December 1967 (age 58); Port of Spain, Trinidad and Tobago
- Batting: Right-handed
- Bowling: Right-arm medium pace

International information
- National side: West Indies
- Test debut (cap 214): 6 March 1997 v India
- Last Test: 5 March 1999 v Australia
- ODI debut (cap 65): 3 November 1993 v Sri Lanka
- Last ODI: 19 December 1997 v England

Domestic team information
- Years: Team
- 1985–2001: Barbados

Career statistics
Competition	Tests	ODIs	FC	LA
Matches	11	37	105	101
Runs scored	380	599	5,945	2,074
Batting average	25.33	23.96	37.86	28.02
100s/50s	0/2	0/2	17/25	1/10
Top score	91	65	183	111
Balls bowled	0	0	0	13
Wickets	–	–	–	0
Bowling average	–	–	–	–
5 wickets in innings	–	–	–	0
10 wickets in match	–	–	–	0
Best bowling	–	–	–	0/0
Catches/stumpings	9/–	8/–	66/–	27/–
- Source: Cricket Archive, 21 October 2010

Roland Irwin Christopher Holder (born 22 December 1967) is a cricketer, born in Port of Spain, Trinidad who played the majority of his first class cricket for Barbados. He made his debut for Barbados in 1986 while still a schoolboy at Combermere School, and played through to the 2000/01 season. He also played 11 Tests and 37 One Day Internationals for the West Indies, between 1993 and 1999, making his Test debut against India at Sabina Park, Jamaica in 1997.

He captained Barbados from 1992 to 94 and in 1999, leading them to victory in the Busta Cup in the latter season, but was left out of the 38-man training squad for the 2001/02 season. Instead, he was selected to lead the 'West Indies B' squad in the Busta Cup.

In 2004, Holder was appointed manager to the Barbados cricket team, having spent a number of years as a senior member of the West Indies Players' Association.

== First Class career ==
In a 16-year career spanning from 1986 to 2002, he compiled 5945 runs in 105 games at an average of 37.86.

== International career ==
Holder made his Test debut against India at Sabina Park in 1997, scoring 21 and 17 not out in a drawn game. He followed that with 91 in the next Test in Trinidad, helping West Indies recover from 169 for six to 296 all out in the first innings. Despite his promising start, he would cross 50 just once more in his next 14 innings before being dropped in 1999.

In ODIs, his best performance was a 48-ball 65 in a losing cause against New Zealand in Trinidad in 1996.
