= Nehemiah Perry (cricketer) =

Jamaican cricketer (born 1968)

Personal information
- Full name: Nehemiah Adolphus Perry
- Born: 16 June 1968 (age 58); Kingston, Jamaica
- Batting: Right-handed
- Bowling: Right-arm off break

International information
- National side: West Indies
- Test debut: 13 March 1999 v Australia
- Last Test: 26 December 1999 v New Zealand
- ODI debut: 11 April 1999 v Australia
- Last ODI: 16 April 2000 v Pakistan

Domestic team information
- Years: Team
- 1986–2004: Jamaica

Career statistics
| Competition | Tests | ODIs | FC | LA |
|---|---|---|---|---|
| Matches | 4 | 21 | 99 | 63 |
| Runs scored | 74 | 212 | 2,592 | 510 |
| Batting average | 12.33 | 26.50 | 20.09 | 17.00 |
| 100s/50s | 0/0 | 0/1 | 1/12 | 0/2 |
| Top score | 26 | 52* | 160 | 56 |
| Balls bowled | 804 | 946 | 19,076 | 3,088 |
| Wickets | 10 | 20 | 299 | 53 |
| Bowling average | 44.60 | 39.15 | 25.04 | 37.60 |
| 5 wickets in innings | 1 | 0 | 13 | 0 |
| 10 wickets in match | 0 | 0 | 3 | 0 |
| Best bowling | 5/70 | 3/45 | 8/45 | 4/45 |
| Catches/stumpings | 1/– | 4/– | 58/– | 22/– |
- Source: Cricket Archive, 25 October 2010

Nehemiah Adolphus Perry (born 16 June 1968) is a former cricketer from Jamaica who played four Tests and 21 One Day Internationals for the West Indies between 1999 and 2000. He was a member of the West Indies squad at the 1999 Cricket World Cup, and also represented Jamaica at the 1998 Commonwealth Games.

He has three sons, and his eldest is a professional footballer. He retired from all cricket due to his age and a consistent pain in his wrists in 2004. His best bowling performance of 5/70 came on debut against Australia in a famous West Indian victory where Brian Lara scored 213.

== See also ==
- List of West Indies cricketers who have taken five-wicket hauls on Test debut
