= Eddie Nicholls =

Guyanese cricket umpire (born 1947)

Personal information
- Full name: Edward Albert Nicholls
- Born: 10 December 1947 (age 78); Demerara, Guyana
- Batting: Right-handed
- Bowling: Right-arm off break

Umpiring information
- Tests umpired: 17 (1997–2001)
- ODIs umpired: 46 (1995–2005)
- Source: Cricinfo, 6 June 2012

Edward Albert Nicholls (born 10 December 1947 in British Guiana) is a former international Test and One Day International cricket umpire from the West Indies. Nicholls officiated in 17 Tests from 1997 to 2001 and 46 ODIs from 1995 to 2005. He was one of four West Indian umpires on the International Cricket Council's International Panel of umpires.

Nicholls is a former police officer who worked in the Immigration Services of the Guyana Police Force. He played club cricket for the Guyanese police force cricket team. He is a widower and the father of one son (deceased) and two daughters.

== See also ==
- List of Test cricket umpires
- List of One Day International cricket umpires
