= Billy Doctrove =

Cricket umpire

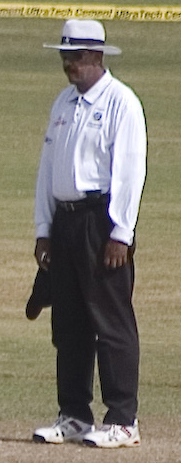
- Doctrove in August 2008

Personal information
- Full name: Billy Raymond Doctrove
- Born: 3 July 1955 (age 71); Marigot, Dominica
- Nickname: Toshack
- Role: Umpire

Umpiring information
- Tests umpired: 38 (2000–2012)
- ODIs umpired: 112 (1998–2012)
- T20Is umpired: 17 (2007–2010)
- WT20Is umpired: 4 (2009)
- Source: ESPNcricinfo, 4 June 2010

Billy Raymond Doctrove (born 3 July 1955) is a Dominican former international football referee, but is best known as an international cricket umpire.

== Career as a FIFA referee ==
During his time as a referee, Doctrove took charge of several international matches, including a World Cup qualifier between Guyana and Grenada in 1996. Despite retiring from international refereeing in 1997, he remains a keen follower of world and English football, supporting Liverpool F.C. and being nicknamed Toshack, after the ex-Liverpool striker. He is also President of the Dominican Football Referees Association, and President of the Windward Islands Cricket Umpires Association.

== Rise to international umpiring ==
After retiring from football refereeing in 1997, Doctrove was able to concentrate more on his career as a first-class umpire. In April 1998, the West Indies Cricket Board appointed Doctrove to his first One Day International (ODI), a fixture between West Indies and England at Kingstown, St. Vincent. Steve Bucknor was the other on-field umpire in the match.

He was appointed to his first test match, the third test between West Indies and Pakistan at the Antigua Recreation Ground, in May 2000.

In 2002, he became a member of the International Panel of ICC Umpires. He stood on that panel for four years during which time he umpired over 100 ODIs and the occasional test. The highlights of his time on the International Panel were an appointment to the 2004 Champions Trophy, and the U19 World Cup in Sri Lanka in early 2006, where he stood in the final. In April 2006 he was promoted to the Elite Panel of ICC Umpires. Doctrove was appointed to the final of the 2010 ICC World Twenty20 in the West Indies.

=== England vs Pakistan fourth test ===
On 20 August 2006, the fourth day of the fourth test between England and Pakistan at The Oval, he and fellow umpire Darrell Hair ruled that the Pakistani team had been involved in ball tampering. They awarded five penalty runs to England and offered them a replacement ball. Play continued until the tea break, but the Pakistani players refused to take the field thereafter in protest. When the Pakistan team refused to return to the field the umpires removed the bails and declared England winners by forfeiture. The Pakistani team did take to the field 26 minutes later, but Hair and Doctrove refused to continue the game stating that the game had already ended with a Pakistani forfeiture the moment the bails were removed.

== Retirement from professional umpiring ==
On 7 June 2012, Doctrove announced his retirement from all ICC umpiring roles due to a family bereavement back in his home country of Dominica. The then 56-year-old stood in 38 Tests, 112 one-day internationals and 21 T20 internationals overall. In a statement, he said, "It has been an incredible 14 years for me as an international umpire and I've enjoyed every moment of it."
