= Carl Hooper =

Guyanese cricketer

Personal information
- Full name: Carl Llewelyn Hooper
- Born: 15 December 1966 (age 59); Georgetown, Guyana
- Height: 6 ft (183 cm)
- Batting: Right-handed
- Bowling: Right arm off break
- Role: All-rounder

International information
- National side: West Indies (1987–2003)
- Test debut (cap 190): 11 December 1987 v India
- Last Test: 3 November 2002 v India
- ODI debut (cap 50): 18 March 1987 v New Zealand
- Last ODI: 4 March 2003 v Kenya
- ODI shirt no.: 4

Domestic team information
- Years: Team
- 1983–1987: Demerara
- 1984–2003: Guyana
- 1992–1998: Kent
- 2003–2004: Lancashire

Career statistics
Competition	Test	ODI	FC	LA
Matches	102	227	339	457
Runs scored	5,762	5,761	23,034	13,357
Batting average	36.46	35.34	47.68	40.11
100s/50s	13/27	7/29	69/104	15/85
Top score	233	113*	236*	145
Balls bowled	13,794	9,573	46,464	19,718
Wickets	114	193	555	396
Bowling average	49.42	36.05	35.30	34.37
5 wickets in innings	4	0	18	1
10 wickets in match	0	0	0	0
Best bowling	5/26	4/34	7/93	5/41
Catches/stumpings	115/–	120/–	375/–	242/–
Medal record
Men's Cricket
Representing West Indies
ICC Champions Trophy
Runner-up	1998 Kenya
- Source: ESPNcricinfo, 29 December 2008

Carl Llewelyn Hooper (born 15 December 1966) is a Guyanese former cricketer who captained the West Indies in Test matches and One Day International matches. An all-rounder, he was a right-handed batsman and off-spin bowler, who came to prominence in the late 1980s in a team that included such players as Vivian Richards, Gordon Greenidge, Desmond Haynes, Malcolm Marshall and Courtney Walsh and represented the West Indies over a 16-year international career.

== Career ==
Hooper first represented the West Indies at youth level and eventually became a regular for Guyana in senior regional tournaments. He later captained Guyana to triumphantly claim three regional List A titles in 1996, 1999 and 2002.

Hooper went on to make his Test debut against India in 1987, scoring his maiden century in only his second test of that tour. During the West Indies' 1991 tour of England, Hooper notched 111 with 14 fours and a six, at Lord's. As well he starred as the overall topscorer with 290 runs, in the 1995 home ODI series against Australia, which the Windies won by a 4-1 margin. He was later named man of the match, scoring 81 and picking up 5 for 26 in the drawn second test of Sri Lanka's 1997 tour of the Windies, played at the Arnos Vale Stadium in Saint Vincent and the Grenadines. As well he was named player of the series for the 1997-98 Singer Akai Champions Trophy, where the Windies were defeated by England in the tournament's final.

During 1992 he joined English county cricket team Kent. Hooper went on to win the batting award, as top scorer with 773 runs, of the 1994 AXA Equity & Law League. His highest score for the club, 236 not out, came against Glamorgan at Canterbury. With his best bowling figures for Kent, 7 for 93, coming in 1998 against Surrey at The Oval. He later won the 1998 Walter Lawrence Trophy, which he shared with Ali Brown. Hooper eventually spent six years there, and was later described by Jo Harman of Wisden as Kent's greatest overseas player of all time. During 2003 Hooper joined Lancashire. During his first season with them, he became only the second player to have scored a century against all 18 county cricket teams. During that season he also scored over 1,100 runs for Lancashire in the County Cricket Championship.

=== Playing style ===
Hooper was also a potent off spinner and nimble slip fielder, apart from being a batsman. He was usually placed in the slip cordon, scoring catches there, in his cricketing career.

Ray Illingworth noted that Hooper's "off-spin is underrated" In his autobiography, Steve Waugh writes that "quickness of feet and sweet yet brutally efficient stroke play were Hooper's trademarks." Wasim Akram has rated Hooper as "one of the top batsmen West Indies produced". Shane Warne also thought very highly of Hooper's footwork and, in 2008, named him among the top 100 cricketers of his time, citing in particular his ability to disguise his dances down the track. Warne felt that determining when a batsman was going to give the charge was one of the most important things for a spinner, and that Hooper was the best at making it indeterminable. "During the 1995 series," he wrote, "this really nagged away at me, because I couldn't spot any of the usual clues even though I knew there had to be a sign that would give him away. On a number of occasions, I stopped at the point of delivery to see if he was giving anything away with his footwork. Most batsmen would be looking to get out of their ground at that point, whereas Hooper just stayed set. In the end, after watching him closely time after time, I managed to crack it. When he wanted to hit over the top, he just looked at me instead of tapping his crease as usual and looking down. Of course, my knowing what he was going to do did not always stop him from doing it."

Hooper struggled early in his career, averaging just 26.08 in his first 38 Tests. However, following his breakthrough 178 not out against Pakistan in 1993, he went on to average 45.60 over his next 58 matches.

=== Later career ===
Hooper first announced his retirement three weeks before the 1999 Cricket World Cup but made a surprising comeback in 2001 as West Indies captain. He captained the team in 22 Tests, leading the Windies to a tight victory in the 2001–02 home series against India. He scored 233 not out, his highest innings in Test match cricket, during the first match of that said test series played in Bourda, Guyana. His record as a batsman also improved with the captaincy. As he averaged 45.97 as captain compared to 36.46 in his Test career as a whole. However, other Test results, especially away from home, were less impressive. He also steered the Windies to win the 2001 Zimbabwe Coca-Cola Cup, defeating India in the tournament's final. During 2002, with Hooper at the helm, West Indies won a home ODI series against New Zealand along with an away ODI series against India. He then captained the Windies at the 2003 Cricket World Cup. Although the Caribbean team failed to progress to the tournament's second round, according to Rob Smyth, "Hooper did very little wrong apart from lose the odd toss and fail to control the weather". Despite losing the captaincy, Hooper was retained in the team for an upcoming Test and ODI series at home against Australia. He however pulled away to again retire from international cricket as he wanted a youngster in the team instead of him.

Hooper holds the accolade of being the first cricketer in the world to have scored 5,000 runs, taken 100 wickets, held 100 catches and received 100 caps in both ODIs and Tests, a feat only matched since by Jacques Kallis. Hooper is also the Windies' fifth highest spinning wicket taker, with 114 scalps in Test Matches. Along with that he's the Windies' fourth highest all time wicket taker, with 193 scalps, in One Day Internationals.

== Post-retirement ==
Since the late 1990s, while still playing for West Indies, Hooper and his wife Constance have lived in Adelaide in South Australia. He has invested in various businesses in Australia and overseas, completed a level three coaching accreditation with Cricket Australia in 2010, and has been involved with the South Australia Cricket Association as well as coaching overseas. He has also worked as a cricket commentator.

In May 2011 Hooper was appointed as the batting coach of the West Indies High Performance Centre located at the University of the West Indies at Cave Hill. At the time he disclosed "The amount of talent I am seeing here has surprised me. I was away [from West Indies] for a while and you would see the game on television, but now that you get close and actually see the guys playing it is clear there is still a lot of talent around". Hooper also opined that "Having an 'academy' is a great thing for West Indies cricket.

During 2014 he was appointed coach of Caribbean Premier League team Antigua Hawksbills before becoming the head coach of Guyana Amazon Warriors in January 2015.

Preceded by Jimmy Adams	West Indies Test cricket captains 2000/01–2002/03	Succeeded by Ridley Jacobs
