= Ridley Jacobs =

West Indian cricketer

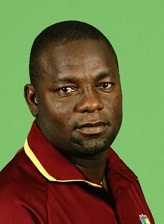

Personal information
- Full name: Ridley Detamore Jacobs
- Born: 26 November 1967 (age 58); Swetes, Associated State of Antigua
- Batting: Left-handed
- Role: Wicket-keeper

International information
- National side: West Indies (1996–2004)
- Test debut (cap 222): 26 November 1998 v South Africa
- Last Test: 29 July 2004 v England
- ODI debut (cap 76): 26 March 1996 v New Zealand
- Last ODI: 10 July 2004 v New Zealand
- ODI shirt no.: 7

Domestic team information
- Years: Team
- 1991–2005: Leeward Islands

Career statistics
Competition	Test	ODI	FC	LA
Matches	65	147	157	222
Runs scored	2,577	1,865	7,518	3,180
Batting average	28.31	23.31	38.75	25.64
100s/50s	3/14	0/9	17/40	0/16
Top score	118	80*	149	85
Balls bowled	–	–	6	–
Wickets	–	–	0	–
Bowling average	–	–	–	–
5 wickets in innings	–	–	–	–
10 wickets in match	–	–	–	–
Best bowling	–	–	–	–
Catches/stumpings	207/12	160/29	443/33	254/43
- Source: CricketArchive, 22 October 2016

Ridley Detamore Jacobs (born 26 November 1967) is a former Antiguan cricketer, who played as a left-handed wicketkeeper batsman for the West Indian cricket team in the late 1990s and early 2000s. He was the first opening batsman to carry his bat in the history of Cricket World Cup and was the fourth batsman to do so in a One Day International. Jacobs also picked up 219 dismissals in tests along with 189 in ODIs, which is second only to Jeff Dujon, for the Windies in his international career.

== International career ==
He made his Test match debut in 1998 on his 31st birthday, playing in 65 Tests in six years. In this time he took over 200 catches behind the stumps, making him only the second West Indies keeper to achieve the feat (after Jeff Dujon). He also played 147 ODIs. However, he was gradually pushed out of the team during 2004 and 2005, with Courtney Browne and Carlton Baugh, Jr. challenging for his position.

He is widely known for playing a valuable knock as opener scoring unbeaten 49 off 142 balls against Australia at the 1999 Cricket World Cup and became the first ever batsman to carry his bat in a World Cup match, 20 years later at the 2019 Cricket World Cup Sri Lankan captain Dimuth Karunaratne joined him in the elite list of carrying the bat in Cricket World Cups.

Jacobs also jointly holds the world record for taking seven catches in a Test innings, which he achieved against Australia in Melbourne in 2000. He shares the feat with Wasim Bari, Bob Taylor and Ian Smith. Jacobs became the first West Indian to score a century for the West Indies against South Africa in the 2001 test series. He later was named as the stand in captain, in place of Carl Hooper, for the Windies' 2002-03 tour of Bangladesh. He led the Windies to a 2-0 win in the ODI series and a 2-0 sweep of the test series upon the tour. During 2004 Jacobs featured in a record breaking partnership, where he scored an unbeaten century 107* and Brian Lara 400 not out, in the fourth test against England at the Antigua Recreation Ground, St. John's, Antigua.

Preceded by Carl Hooper	West Indies Test cricket captains 2002/3	Succeeded by Brian Lara
