= Jimmy Adams =

West Indian cricketer

Personal information
- Full name: James Clive Adams
- Born: 9 January 1968 (age 58); Port Maria, Jamaica
- Batting: Left-handed
- Bowling: Slow left arm orthodox
- Role: Batsman

International information
- National side: West Indies
- Test debut (cap 199): 18 April 1992 v South Africa
- Last Test: 6 January 2001 v Australia
- ODI debut (cap 64): 17 December 1992 v Pakistan
- Last ODI: 9 February 2001 v Australia

Domestic team information
- Years: Team
- 1984–2001: Jamaica
- 1994: Nottinghamshire
- 2001–2003: Orange Free State
- 2003: Berkshire

Career statistics
Competition	Test	ODI	FC	LA
Matches	54	127	202	228
Runs scored	3,012	2,204	11,234	5,319
Batting average	41.26	28.62	39.69	34.53
100s/50s	6/14	0/14	25/54	1/34
Top score	208*	82	208*	112
Balls bowled	2,853	1,856	9,789	3,532
Wickets	27	43	103	83
Bowling average	49.48	34.86	40.39	32.89
5 wickets in innings	1	1	1	1
10 wickets in match	0	0	0	0
Best bowling	5/17	5/37	5/17	5/37
Catches/stumpings	48/0	68/5	177/0	117/7
- Source: Cricinfo, 26 September 2007

James Clive Adams OD (born 9 January 1968) is a former Jamaican cricketer, who represented the West Indies as player and captain during his career. He was a left-handed batsman, left-arm orthodox spin bowler and fielder, especially in the gully position. He was also an occasional wicketkeeper when required. He was the head coach of Kent County Cricket Club for five seasons between 2012 and October 2016.

He retired from all cricket in 2004 after a twenty-year career, ending with a Test batting average of 41.26 with a highest score of 208 not out against New Zealand at St. John's, Antigua and Barbuda in 1995.

In addition to his playing and coaching credentials, Adams was appointed chairman of FICA in May 2009, replacing the South African great Barry Richards. Adams held this role until March 2017 when he was replaced by Vikram Solanki, Surrey CCC's head coach.

== Domestic career ==
Adams was called into the Jamaican squad for the 1984/85 season as a teenager and enjoyed a good if unspectacular start to his first-class career. He continued his cricket career for a couple of years after the year 2000, captaining South African provincial team Free State and making guest appearances for Lashings World XI in England.

== International career ==
=== Making his mark ===
Although it wasn't until the 1991/92 season that he was called into the West Indies Test squad for the first time, making his debut against South Africa at the Kensington Oval in Bridgetown, Barbados. He went on to pick up 4/43 in South Africa's first innings and score a vital 79 not out in the Caribbean side's second innings to help the Windies win this one off encounter.

During the first test against New Zealand of the 1995/96 season, Adams claimed 5 for 17, his only five wicket haul in test match cricket at Barbados' Kensington Oval. Within the subsequent and final test of that series he scored a career best 208 not out in a drawn encounter at the Antigua Recreation Ground in St John's, Antigua. West Indies won the series by a 1–0 margin.

=== Captaincy ===
Adams was appointed as West Indies captain in 2000, in replacing Brian Lara. He started off with test series victories against Zimbabwe and Pakistan in the Caribbean. Though Windies went on to falter in an away test series against England. After a 5–0 test series loss on the 2000/01 tour of Australia, Adams thereafter lost both the captaincy (to Carl Hooper) and his place in the regional side. News of Adams' impending dismissal was divulged by friend and national TV reporter, Peter Furst. He simply responded, "Have you heard something I haven't?" He then reflected on his career, saying that whatever happened it had all been a blessing – both the good and bad.

With an average of 41.26 from 54 tests, Adams' Test career thus came to a close. He later joined up as the new skipper of South African club side Free State.

== Coaching career ==
He was head coach at Kent County Cricket Club for five seasons between 2012 and 2016.

== Personal life ==
During August 2021 Adams was bestowed with Jamaica's Order of Distinction for his contribution to the sphere of sport.

Preceded by Brian Lara	West Indies Test cricket captains 2000/01	Succeeded by Carl Hooper
Preceded by Brian Lara	West Indies one-day international cricket captains 2000/01	Succeeded by Carl Hooper
