= Mervyn Dillon =

Trinidadian cricketer

Personal information
- Full name: Mervyn Dillon
- Born: 5 June 1974 (age 52); Toco, Trinidad and Tobago
- Height: 6 ft 4 in (1.93 m)
- Batting: Right-handed
- Bowling: Right-arm fast-medium

International information
- National side: West Indies
- Test debut: 14 March 1997 v India
- Last Test: 16 January 2004 v South Africa
- ODI debut: 3 November 1997 v South Africa
- Last ODI: 26 January 2005 v Australia

Domestic team information
- Years: Team
- 1996–2008: Trinidad and Tobago

Career statistics
Competition	Tests	ODIs	FC	LA
Matches	38	108	91	161
Runs scored	549	227	1,052	459
Batting average	8.44	7.32	8.28	8.50
100s/50s	0/0	0/0	0/1	0/0
Top score	43	21*	52	41
Balls bowled	8,704	5,480	17,001	7,918
Wickets	131	130	291	188
Bowling average	33.57	32.44	29.20	30.38
5 wickets in innings	2	3	7	3
10 wickets in match	0	0	0	0
Best bowling	5/71	5/29	6/40	5/29
Catches/stumpings	16/–	20/–	35/–	35/–
Medal record
Men's Cricket
Representing West Indies
ICC Champions Trophy
Winner	2004 England
- Source: CricketArchive, 24 October 2010

Mervyn Dillon (born 5 June 1974), is a former Trinidadian cricketer who featured as a fast bowler for West Indies. He emerged at the twilight of both Courtney Walsh and Curtly Ambrose's careers. Dillon soon became the Windies' new bowling spearhead, picking up a sum of 131 wickets in 38 test matches and 130 wickets from 108 one day internationals. Dillon was a member of the West Indies team that won the 2004 ICC Champions Trophy.

== International career ==
Dillon was born in Mission Village, Toco, Trinidad and Tobago. At one stage, after Courtney Walsh and Curtly Ambrose retired from international cricket, Dillon was the spearhead of the West Indies bowling attack. Subsequently, Dillon was labelled by Simon Briggs as "the natural successor to Courtney Walsh", noting that " his action has a hint of [Walsh's] well-oiled efficiency". According to Briggs, "he takes a high percentage of wickets with the ball that angles in then just holds its own". Steve Waugh labelled him "the West Indies' most notable underachiever...when he had his act together, [he] didn't lose much in comparison to his legendary predecessors [Ambrose and Walsh]...such days were a rarity."

He was involved in a remarkable incident at Kandy's Asgiriya Stadium on 21 November 2001 in a test against Sri Lanka when he contracted abdominal pains and was replaced by Colin Stuart after two balls of his third over. Stuart was banned from bowling for the remainder of the innings by umpire John Hampshire after delivering two beamers that were called as no-balls in his first three deliveries. Chris Gayle then completed the last three balls of the over with his off-spin. This was the only instance in the history of Test cricket, when three bowlers were used to complete one over.

During the Windies' 2002 five test match series against India, one Dillon's bouncers went on to break the jaw of spinner Anil Kumble. He went on to pick up 23 wickets at an average of 27.21 in that said series.

In October 2007, Dillon signed up as an overseas player for the Indian Cricket League.

== Coaching career ==
In January 2022 Dillon was appointed head coach of BPL outfit Sylhet Strikers.

== Political career ==
Dillon applied to be a People's National Movement candidate in the 2020 Trinidad and Tobago general election. He wanted to stand in the seat of Toco/Sangre Grande but Roger Monroe was chosen instead.

== Personal life ==
In 2021 Dillon's daughter, Merelle, then a trainee pilot, was involved in a plane crash in Piarco.
