= Sherwin Campbell =

West Indian cricketer (born 1970)

Personal information
- Full name: Sherwin Legay Campbell
- Born: 1 November 1970 (age 56); Belleplaine, Barbados
- Batting: Right-handed
- Bowling: Right-arm medium pace

International information
- National side: West Indies (1994–2002)
- Test debut (cap 208): 3 February 1995 v New Zealand
- Last Test: 31 January 2002 v Pakistan
- ODI debut (cap 70): 23 October 1994 v India
- Last ODI: 2 February 2001 v Zimbabwe

Domestic team information
- Years: Team
- 1989–2005: Barbados
- 1996: Durham

Career statistics
Competition	Test	ODI	FC	LA
Matches	52	90	177	175
Runs scored	2,882	2,283	10,873	4,411
Batting average	32.38	26.24	36.98	26.41
100s/50s	4/18	2/14	26/55	3/27
Top score	208	105	211*	105
Balls bowled	0	196	331	315
Wickets	–	8	2	9
Bowling average	–	21.25	88.00	30.11
5 wickets in innings	–	0	0	0
10 wickets in match	–	0	0	0
Best bowling	–	4/30	1/30	4/30
Catches/stumpings	47/–	23/–	164/–	58/–
- Source: CricketArchive, 21 October 2016

Sherwin Legay Campbell (born 1 November 1970) is a former Barbadian cricketer who played 52 Tests and 90 One Day Internationals for the West Indies, and also a former ODI captain for Windies.

== Domestic career ==
Campbell played a total of 177 first class games between 1990–91 and 2004–05, scoring more than 10,000 first class runs with 26 centuries at an average of 37.

He made his Barbados debut in the 1989–90 season. Campbell eventually earned the attention of the West Indies' selectors during the 1993-94 Red Stripe Cup, amassing 400 runs in five games with three hundreds. He finished third among the averages that year (57.14) behind Brian Lara (79.44) and Richie Richardson (61.66).

He notched, in February 2004, his highest first class score of 211 not out, against the Leeward Islands. The Bajans won that season's Carib Beer Cup with their triumph in that game. Campbell made his final appearance for Barbados during the following regional season.

== International career ==
Campbell began his Test career with innings of 51 and 88 on the 1995 tour of New Zealand though he struggled against Australia the following home season and was dropped in favor of Stuart Williams.

He established himself while touring England that summer, finishing second among run scorers with 454 runs in six Tests at 45.40. His 79 in the third Test at Edgbaston earned him the Man of the Match award while scores of 69 at Headingley, 93 at Lord's and 89 at The Oval further cemented his place.

Campbell averaged 52.76 in his first 13 Tests and reached a peak of 13th in the ICC Test Batting Rankings in late 1996. He was the sixth fastest West Indian (and joint 24th overall) to reach 1000 Test runs, taking 20 innings, though his final 39 Tests saw him average 26.08.

Among his four Test centuries was a high score of 208 against New Zealand in the 1995–96 series on his home ground in Bridgetown. Batting for thirteen hours, he hit 30 fours and by the time he left the score was 458 for 8 – well ahead of New Zealand's first innings total of 195. He also hit 29 not out in the second innings as the West Indies won by ten wickets.

His second Test century, a gritty fourth innings 113, came against an Australian attack including Glen McGrath and Shane Warne in Brisbane that year. Campbell batted nearly seven hours to bring West Indies within sight of a draw before falling in the third session of the final day.

He was the team's leading run-scorer (248) during the ill-fated Pakistan tour of 1997, standing up to the new ball pair of Wasim Akram and Waqar Younis as his teammates struggled to a 3–0 defeat.

He played a major role in the famous Bridgetown Test against Australia in 1999 with his first innings 105 helping West Indies recover from 98 for six to 329 all out in reply to Australia's 490. They eventually won the Test by one wicket thanks to Brian Lara's unbeaten 153 in the fourth innings.

After hitting 170 against New Zealand in the first Test at Hamilton in 1999–2000 he failed to hit a century in his next 33 innings, and only passed 50 five times – in a run yielding 701 runs at 21.24. 79 and 54 in the last Test of the 2000–01 Frank Worrell Trophy against Australia could not prevent him being dropped after the tour.

After missing 10 Tests he earned a recall for the first Test against Pakistan in Sharjah in 2002. He made six and 20 and was dropped for the final time at age 32.

With 2856 runs, he finished his career as West Indies' fifth most successful opening batsman behind Gordon Greenidge (7488), Desmond Haynes (7422) Roy Fredericks (4329) and Conrad Hunte (3245). He has since been overtaken by Chris Gayle (7028) and Kraigg Brathwaite (3475).

In ODIs, he claimed the Man of the Series award in the epic seven-match rubber against Australia in 1999. His 312 runs at 44.57 helped West Indies secure a memorable 3–3 result against the world's top ranked team.

His two centuries in the format were both made against Zimbabwe in 2000.

== County Cricket ==
Campbell was signed by Durham for the 1996 County season following his success on the England tour the year before. Though he did not match his previous form, he was the team's leading first class scorer with 1019 runs in 15 matches at 37.74 including one hundred and seven fifties.

== Coaching career ==
Campbell was appointed coach of the West Indies women's cricket team in 2008. He went on to steer the side to the final of the 2013 Women's Cricket World Cup where they emerged as runners up to Australia.
