= West Indian cricket team in India in 1994–95 =

International cricket tour

West Indies cricket team in India in 1994-95
	India	West Indies
- Dates: 17 October 1994 – 14 December 1994
Captains	Mohammed Azharuddin	Courtney Walsh, Brian Lara

Test series
- Result: 3-match series drawn 1–1
Most runs	Sachin Tendulkar (402)	Jimmy Adams (511)
Most wickets	Venkatapathy Raju (20)	Kenny Benjamin (17)
- Player of the series: Jimmy Adams (West Indies)

One Day International series
- Results: India won the 5-match series 4–1
Most runs	Sachin Tendulkar (247)	Carl Hooper (291)
Most wickets	Anil Kumble (9)	Carl Hooper (9)
- Player of the series: Sachin Tendulkar (India)

The West Indies national cricket team visited India in 1994 for a 5-match ODI series and followed by a 3-match test series. India won the ODI series 4-1 and the test series was drawn 1-1.

The bilateral ODI series was played around the Wills world series 1994-95, a triangular ODI tournament featuring India, West Indies and New Zealand, and also won by India. The triangular ODI tournament was played in colour clothing while the bilateral series was played in whites.

== Squads ==
India		West Indies	
Tests	ODIs	Tests	ODIs
Mohammed Azharuddin (c); Sachin Tendulkar; Anil Kumble; Navjot Singh Sidhu; Javagal Srinath; Vinod Kambli; Manoj Prabhakar; Nayan Mongia (wk); Sanjay Manjrekar; Venkatapathy Raju; Rajesh Chauhan; Aashish Kapoor	Mohammed Azharuddin (c); Sachin Tendulkar; Anil Kumble; Navjot Singh Sidhu; Javagal Srinath; Vinod Kambli; Manoj Prabhakar; Nayan Mongia (wk); Sanjay Manjrekar; Venkatapathy Raju; Rajesh Chauhan; Atul Bedade; Kapil Dev; Venkatesh Prasad; Ajay Jadeja; Chetan Sharma	Courtney Walsh (c); Brian Lara; Shivnarine Chanderpaul; Carl Hooper; Jimmy Adams; Phil Simmons; Stuart Williams; Keith Arthurton; Cameron Cuffy; Junior Murray (wk); Rajindra Dhanraj; Kenny Benjamin; Anderson Cummons	Courtney Walsh (c); Brian Lara; Shivnarine Chanderpaul; Carl Hooper; Jimmy Adams; Phil Simmons; Stuart Williams; Keith Arthurton; Cameron Cuffy; Junior Murray (wk); Rajindra Dhanraj; Kenny Benjamin; Anderson Cummons; Barrington Browne; Roland Holder

== ODI Series ==
=== 1st ODI ===
17 October

West Indies; 273-5 (50 overs)	v	India; 177 (45 overs)
Phil Simmons 76 (100); Javagal Srinath 3/42 (10 overs)		Navjot Singh Sidhu 52 (87); Courtney Walsh 2/11 (5 overs)

West Indies won by 96 runs
Nahar Singh Stadium, Faridabad, India
Umpires: S. K. Sharma (India) and Ivaturi Shivram (India)
Player of the match: Phil Simmons (West Indies)

- West Indies won the toss and chose to bat

Shivnarine Chanderpaul, Cameron Cuffy and Stuart Williams made their ODI debuts for the West Indies.

Kapil Dev's last ODI for India.

=== 2nd ODI ===
20 October

West Indies; 192-9 (50 overs)	v	India; 135-4 (33.1 overs)
Carl Hooper 70 (86); Javagal Srinath 3/34 (10 overs)		Navjot Singh Sidhu 65 (102); Cameron Cuffy 2/29 (8.1 overs)

India won by 8 runs (Revised target)
Wankhede Stadium, Mumbai, India
Umpires: Narendra Menon (India) and R. T. Ramachandran (India)
Player of the match: Navjot Singh Sidhu (India)

- India won the toss and chose to field

Barrington Browne made his ODI debut for the West Indies.

=== 3rd ODI ===
7 November

India; 260-4 (44 overs)	v	West Indies; 256-7 (43 overs)
Navjot Singh Sidhu 114 (100); Courtney Walsh 1/50 (9 overs)		Carl Hooper 74 (47); Anil Kumble 2/41 (7 overs)

India won by 4 runs
Indira Priyadarshini Stadium, Visakhapatnam, India
Umpires: H. S. Sekhon (India) and Raman Sharma (India)
Player of the match: Navjot Singh Sidhu (India)

- West Indies won the toss and chose to field

=== 4th ODI ===
9 November

West Indies; 251-9 (50 overs)	v	India; 256-2 (49.2 overs)
Brian Lara 89 (106); Anil Kumble 3/43 (10 overs)		Ajay Jadeja 104 (126); Courtney Walsh 1/29 (10 overs)

India won by 8 wickets
Barabati Stadium, Cuttack, India
Umpires: Arani Jayaprakash (India) and Jose Kurushinkal (India)
Player of the match: Ajay Jadeja (India)

- West Indies won the toss and chose to bat
- Ajay Jadeja (Ind) scored his first century in ODIs.

=== 5th ODI ===
11 November

India; 259-5 (50 overs)	v	West Indies; 254 (49 overs)
Sachin Tendulkar 105 (134); Anderson Cummins 2/49 (10 overs)		Carl Hooper 84 (88); Venkatapathy Raju 4/46 (9 overs)

India won by 5 runs
Sawai Mansingh Stadium, Jaipur, India
Umpires: S. Choudhary (India) and Subroto Porel (India)
Player of the match: Carl Hooper (West Indies)

- India won the toss and chose to bat

Brian Lara was the captain of the West Indies instead of Courtney Walsh, who was rested.

== Test Series ==
=== 1st Test ===
18-22 November 1994

India	v	West Indies
272 (85.3 overs); Nayan Mongia 80 (147); Courtney Walsh 6/79 (22 overs)		243 (82.5 overs); Stuart Williams 49 (131); Venkatapathy Raju 5/60 (21 overs)
333 (98.1 overs); Sachin Tendulkar 85 (130); Kenny Benjamin 4/82 (24 overs)		266 (81.4 overs); Junior Murray 85 (130); Javagal Srinath 4/48 (20 overs)

India won by 96 runs
Wankhede Stadium, Mumbai
Umpires: Dickie Bird (Eng) and Shyam Bansal (Ind)
Player of the match: Javagal Srinath (Ind)

- India won the toss and elected to bat.
  - Cameron Cuffy and Rajindra Dhanraj made their test debuts for the West Indies.

=== 2nd Test ===
1-5 December 1994

India	v	West Indies
546-9d (155 overs); Sachin Tendulkar 179 (322); Carl Hooper 5/116 (40 overs)		428 (153 overs); Jimmy Adams 125 (312); Venkatapathy Raju 5/127 (50 overs)
208-9d (63.4 overs); Navjot Singh Sidhu 76 (165); Courtney Walsh 2/2 (5 overs)		132-5 (62 overs); Carl Hooper 67 (89); Anil Kumble 3/45 (23 overs)

Match drawn
Vidarbha Cricket Association Stadium, Nagpur
Umpires: Nigel Plews (Eng) and V. K. Ramaswamy (Ind)
Player of the match: Carl Hooper (West Indies)

- India won the toss and elected to bat.

=== 3rd Test ===
10-14 December 1994

West Indies	v	India
443 (142.4 overs); Jimmy Adams 174 (371); Anil Kumble 4/90 (29 overs)		387 (128.3 overs); Manoj Prabhakar 120 (275); Kenny Benjamin 3/106 (35.3 overs)
301-3d (56.3 overs); Jimmy Adams 78 (84); Venkatapathy Raju 2/60 (12.3 overs)		114-9 (35.2 overs); Javagal Srinath 17 (31); Kenny Benjamin 5/65 (17 overs)

West Indies won by 243 runs
Punjab Cricket Association IS Bindra Stadium, Mohali
Umpires: Steve Dunne (New Zealand) and Srinivasaraghavan Venkataraghavan (Ind)
Player of the match: Jimmy Adams (West Indies)

- West Indies won the toss and elected to bat.
- Aashish Kapoor made his test debut for India.
- Manoj Prabhakar was retired hurt in India's second innings and did not bat again.
