= West Indian cricket team in Sri Lanka in 1993–94 =

International cricket tour

	Sri Lanka	West indies
- Dates: 1 December 1993 – 18 December 1993
Captains	Arjuna Ranatunga	Richie Richardson

Test series
- Result: 1-match series drawn 0–0
Most runs	Aravinda de Silva (68)	Carl Hooper (62)
Most wickets	Winston Benjamin (5)	Muttiah Muralitharan (4)

One Day International series
- Results: 3-match series drawn 1–1
Most runs	Brian Lara (183)	Aravinda de Silva (87)
Most wickets	Courtney Walsh (5)	Ruwan Kalpage (4)
- Player of the series: Brian Lara

The West Indies cricket team toured Sri Lanka from 1 to 18 December 1993. The tour consisted of three One Day Internationals (ODIs) and a one off Test match. This was the first time the West Indies toured Sri Lanka, which hosted the first ever Test match between the two countries. A three-day tour match between West Indies and Sri Lanka Board President's XI was also played at the Galle International Stadium from 3–5 December.

The tour was disrupted by bad weather, only one of its five fixtures ran its full course. The Test match had less than 12 hours of play. The only other first-class match, at Galle, was even more abbreviated. Rain prevented a finish to the first one-day international and the third was turned into a 23-over match.

The tour was first projected to be a three-Test series. It was rearranged and shortened to accommodate the Hero Cup, a limited-overs competition in India in which both teams took part.

== Squads ==
Test squads		ODI squads
Sri Lanka	West Indies	Sri Lanka	West Indies
Arjuna Ranatunga (c)	Richie Richardson (c)	Arjuna Ranatunga (c)	Richie Richardson (c)
Roshan Mahanama	Desmond Haynes (vc)	Roshan Mahanama	Brian Lara
Dulip Samaraweera	Phil Simmons	Sanath Jayasuriya	Phil Simmons
Hashan Tillakaratne	Brian Lara	Aravinda de Silva	Keith Arthurton
Aravinda de Silva	Keith Arthurton	Hashan Tillakaratne	Carl Hooper
Sanath Jayasuriya	Carl Hooper	Hemantha Wickramaratne	Jimmy Adams (wk)
Ruwan Kalpage	Roger Harper	Ruwan Kalpage	Roger Harper
Pubudu Dassanayake (wk)	Junior Murray (wk)	Romesh Kaluwitharana (wk)	Junior Murray (wk)
Pramodya Wickramasinghe	Winston Benjamin	Rumesh Ratnayake	Curtly Ambrose
Don Anurasiri	Curtly Ambrose	Pramodya Wickramasinghe	Kenny Benjamin
Muttiah Muralitharan	Courtney Walsh	Don Anurasiri	Courtney Walsh
		Dulip Liyanage	Desmond Haynes
		Dulip Samaraweera	Anderson Cummins
			Winston Benjamin

== First-class match ==
=== Tour match – Sri Lanka Board President's XI v West Indians ===
3 December 1993
Scorecard

West Indians	v	Sri Lanka Board President's XI
279/6 (105.5 overs); Carl Hooper 89; Asanka Gurusinha 2/26 (25 overs)

Match drawn
Galle International Stadium
Umpires: Lalith Jayasundara & Udaya Wickramasinghe

- West Indians won the toss and decided to bat
- There was no play on the final day.
- Roger Harper passed 6500 runs in First-Class Matches when he reached 54

== Test match ==
8 December 1993
Scorecard

Sri Lanka	v	West Indies
190 (98.2 overs); Aravinda de Silva 53 (129); Winston Benjamin 4/46 (20 overs)		204 (78.5 overs); Carl Hooper 62 (121); Muttiah Muralitharan 4/47 (15.5 overs)
43/2 (22.1 overs); Aravinda de Silva 15* (10); Winston Benjamin 1/5 (6 overs)

Match drawn
Tyronne Fernando Stadium, Moratuwa
Umpires: K. T. Francis & T. M. Samarasinghe

- Sri Lanka, who chose to bat
- First ever test match between West Indies and Sri Lanka.
- Match extended by 1-day (Due to no play on Day 1, the rest day was used)
- Dulip Samaraweera made his Test debut for Sri Lanka.

This tour marked the first time the West Indies toured Sri Lanka for a full series, which included the very first Test match played between the two teams. Unfortunately the low scoring match was disrupted by the dreadful weather which only allowed for 11 1/2 hours' of play, and was very poorly attended. There was no play on day one and no balls were bowled on days four and five.

Sri Lanka won the toss and batted first, scoring 190 in under 100 overs with only a single half century in the innings by de Silva. The pitch was turning while the West Indies, for the first time in five years, played two front-line spinners, Harper joining Hooper. At Ranatunga's wicket, Sri Lanka were 130 for six. The seventh-wicket stand between Kalpage and wicket-keeper Dassanayake showed some defence however Ambrose effortlessly demolished the tail end

The West Indian innings were hardly as successful. The Sri Lankan spinners shared all ten wickets, Muralitharan claiming four of them. Losing four for 84, the fifth-wicket partnership between Richardson and Hooper gave the West Indies the lead. With the loss of that partnership the last six wickets went down for 36 runs. The match was drawn after 22 overs into Sri Lanka's second innings.

== ODI series ==
Three ODIs were played, one before and two after the Test match.

=== 1st ODI ===
1 December 1993 (D/N)
Scorecard

West Indies; 197/3 (39 overs)	v	Sri Lanka; 35/2 (12.1 overs)
Brian Lara 89 (118); Don Anurasiri 1/26 (8 overs)		Arjuna Ranatunga * 11 (14); Courtney Walsh 1/10 (5 overs)

No result
P Saravanamuttu Stadium, Colombo
Umpires: B. C. Cooray (SL) & Peter Manuel (SL)

- West Indies, who chose to bat
- Match abandoned due to rain and bad light.
- Overnight rain Shortened the game to 39 overs a side.
- ST Jayasuriya retired hurt at 13/0

Overnight rain reduced the game to 39 overs a side, the game was further disrupted and prematurely finished due to the dark clouds and furious thunderstorms. Both teams found it hard to score runs on the slow pitch, however Lara's drives and clips off the legs raced to the boundary despite an extremely heavy outfield; he hit eight fours in 118 balls. Scoring only 16 runs in the first ten overs of Ambrose and Walsh, as well as losing the wicket of De Silva and Jayasuriya forced to retire with cramps, the Sri Lanka batsmen readily accepted the light when offered after an indiscreet bouncer from Kenny Benjamin.

=== 2nd ODI ===
16 December 1993 (D/N)
Scorecard

West Indies; 229/8 (49 overs)	v	Sri Lanka; 230/7 (48.1 overs)
Brian Lara 65 (77); Ruwan Kalpage 4/45 (10 overs)		Arjuna Ranatunga 66 (78); Anderson Cummins 4/33 (10 overs)

Sri Lanka won by 3 wickets (with 5 balls remaining)
Khettarama Stadium, Colombo
Umpires: B.C. Cooray & K. T. Francis
Player of the match: Arjuna Ranatunga

- West Indies, who chose to bat

After 18 limited-overs matches against the West Indies, Sri Lanka pulled off only their second win, with five balls to spare. Opening the batting, Haynes and Lara made a rollicking start with 128 from 26 overs, but were later bogged down by the spinners. After a thrill less innings, Sri Lanka entered the last nine overs needing 50 runs. The captain, Ranatunga, put Sri Lanka back on track attacking Ambrose for 12 runs in the penultimate over, levelling the scores and winning the match for the team. The West Indies gave away 18 wides finding bowling under the floodlights troublesome.

=== 3rd ODI ===
18 December 1993 (D/N)
Scorecard

Sri Lanka; 103/5 (23 overs)	v	West Indies; 107/4 (22.1 overs)
Aravinda de Silva 34 (49); Courtney Walsh 3/24 (5 overs)		Brian Lara 29 (54); Sanath Jayasuriya 2/28 (5 overs)

West Indies won by 6 wickets (with 5 balls remaining)
Sinhalese Sports Club Ground, Colombo
Umpires: Peter Manuel & Udaya Wickramasinghe
Player of the match: Keith Arthurton

- Sri Lanka, who chose to bat
- Match reduced by rain to 23 overs per side.
- The match was reduced before play started to 25 overs per side
- Aravinda de Silva de Silva passed 3500 runs in ODIs when he reached 22

Heavy rain reduced the final match to a 23 overs a side game. Walsh exploited the sweating pitch, which offered ample movement, to capture the first three wickets, crippling the Sri Lankan batting even though De Silva batted sensibly. The cruising West Indians were pressured by the spinners and the required run rate rose to 35 in five overs. However, Arthurton's gigantic six over extra cover eased the pressure and put West Indies on course for victory.
