= West Indian cricket team in England in 1995 =

International cricket tour

	West Indies	England
- Dates: 13 May – 3 September 1995
Captains	Richie Richardson	Mike Atherton

Test series
- Result: 6-match series drawn 2–2
Most runs	Brian Lara (765)	Graham Thorpe (506)
Most wickets	Ian Bishop (27)	Dominic Cork (26)
- Player of the series: Mike Atherton and Brian Lara

One Day International series
- Results: England won the 3-match series 2–1
Most runs	Brian Lara (120)	Mike Atherton (227)
Most wickets	Winston Benjamin (4)	Peter Martin (6)
- Player of the series: Mike Atherton and Junior Murray

The West Indian cricket team toured England from 13 May to 3 September 1995 as part of the 1995 English cricket season. The tour included six Tests and three One Day Internationals. The Test series was drawn 2–2 while the ODI series finished 2–1 to England. The first ODI match of the series was the 1,000th ODI to be played.

This was Ray Illingworth's first series in charge as England Team Manager as well as Chairman of Selectors, having sacked Keith Fletcher earlier in the year after the Ashes defeat.

== Overview ==
Both sides came into this series with the Australians as their most recent opponents. England's 3–1 defeat in the Ashes series in Australia was considered a real disappointment, and ultimately led to the dismissal of Team Manager Keith Fletcher. Long-serving former captains Graham Gooch and Mike Gatting retired from international cricket after the tour, having had disappointing campaigns.

The West Indians' home defeat by the Australians was a more closely fought affair, with Brian Lara (308 runs at 44) Curtly Ambrose (20 wickets at 21.55) and Courtney Walsh (13 at 19.84) all performing strongly against a touring team shorn of the injured Craig McDermott, but with strong back-up in the form of Glenn McGrath and Paul Reiffel. The defeat became a symbolic point in the exchange of power between the two sides, ending the West Indies' dominance and signalling Australia overtaking them as the leading cricketing nation.

At this point, England had not won a series against the Windies since 1969.

For England, Mike Atherton was retained as captain, though his appointment was only confirmed on the eve of the season, and the One Day International series saw debuts for Lancashire's Peter Martin and Kent's Alan Wells, while the West Indies blooded Ottis Gibson, a fiery all-rounder from Barbados. The early part of the tour was hampered by the weather, with the first ODI going into the reserve day.

West Indian concerns at the start of the summer surrounded the form of captain Richie Richardson, who began the tour with a run of low scores, and a series of injuries to bowlers' backs, allegedly a result of sleeping on soft beds.

== Squads ==
Squads
England	West Indies
Mike Atherton (c)	Richie Richardson (c)
Alec Stewart (wk)	Courtney Browne (wk)
Jack Russell (wk)	Junior Murray (wk)
Steven Rhodes (wk)	Brian Lara
Dominic Cork	Curtly Ambrose
John Crawley	Keith Arthurton
Robin Smith	Kenny Benjamin
John Emburey	Winston Benjamin (withdrawn)
Neil Fairbrother	Ian Bishop
Angus Fraser	Sherwin Campbell
Jason Gallian	Shivnarine Chanderpaul
Darren Gough	Rajindra Dhanraj
Graeme Hick	Ottis Gibson
Richard Illingworth	Carl Hooper
Mark Ilott	Jimmy Adams
Nick Knight	Courtney Walsh
Craig White	Stuart Williams
Peter Martin	Vasbert Drakes (added 26 June)
Mark Ramprakash	
Graham Thorpe	
Phil DeFreitas	
Phil Tufnell	
Devon Malcolm	
Mike Watkinson	
Shaun Udal	
Alan Wells	
Source:Cricinfo	Source:Cricinfo

== One Day Internationals (ODIs) ==
England won the Texaco Trophy 2–1.

=== 1st ODI ===
24–25 May 1995
Scorecard

England; 199/9 (55 overs)	v	West Indies; 201/5 (52.4 overs)
Alec Stewart 74 (127); Courtney Walsh 3/28 (10 overs)		Sherwin Campbell 80 (137); Darren Gough 2/30 (11 overs)

West Indies won by 5 wickets
Trent Bridge, Nottingham
Umpires: Nigel Plews and David Shepherd
Player of the match: Courtney Walsh (WI)

- West Indies won the toss and elected to field.
- The match extended into a second day due to rain and bad light on the first day.
- West Indies were 76/1 (19.5 overs) at the close of the first day's play.

=== 2nd ODI ===
26 May 1995
Scorecard

England; 306/5 (55 overs)	v	West Indies; 281 (53 overs)
Mike Atherton 92 (118); Winston Benjamin 1/55 (10.4 overs)		Junior Murray 86 (77); Peter Martin 4/44 (10 overs)

England won by 25 runs
The Oval, London
Umpires: Dickie Bird and Roy Palmer
Player of the match: Peter Martin (Eng)

- West Indies won the toss and elected to field.
- Peter Martin (Eng) made his ODI debut.

=== 3rd ODI ===
28 May 1995
Scorecard

England; 276/7 (55 overs)	v	West Indies; 203 (48.2 overs)
Mike Atherton 127 (160); Ottis Gibson 3/51 (11 overs)		Carl Hooper 40 (89); Dominic Cork 3/27 (9 overs)

England won by 73 runs
Lord's, London
Umpires: John Hampshire and Mervyn Kitchen
Player of the match: Mike Atherton (Eng)

- West Indies won the toss and elected to field.
- Alan Wells (Eng) and Ottis Gibson (WI) made their ODI debuts.

== Test series – The Wisden Trophy ==
=== 1st Test ===
8–11 June 1995
Scorecard

England	v	West Indies
199 (59.5 overs); Mike Atherton 81 (145); Kenny Benjamin 4/60 (13.5 overs)		282 (90.3 overs); Sherwin Campbell 69 (101); Devon Malcolm 2/48 (7.3 overs)
208 (67.2 overs); Graham Thorpe 61 (119); Courtney Walsh 4/60 (22 overs)		129/1 (19 overs); Carl Hooper 73* (72); Peter Martin 1/49 (8 overs)

West Indies won by 9 wickets
Headingley, Leeds
Umpires: Dickie Bird (Eng) and Srinivasaraghavan Venkataraghavan (Ind)
Player of the match: Ian Bishop (WI)

- West Indies won the toss and elected to field.

The first Test saw the home side opt for five specialist bowlers, but there was no place for Angus Fraser despite his performances down-under in the winter. Instead a début was handed to Peter Martin, who had impressed with a four-wicket haul on his ODI debut, and Devon Malcolm was included on the basis of his extra pace. The West Indians selected their customary battery of four pacemen, Ian Bishop and Kenny Benjamin backing up spearheads Walsh and Ambrose.

Richardson won the toss and invited England to bat, and the main feature of the day was the intermittent rain, which saw the players on and off the field at various intervals all day. Amidst the rain, Atherton and Robin Smith added 52 for the first wicket before Benjamin struck with a ball that moved back in, and the edge carried to the visitors' captain at third slip. Graeme Hick could only add 18 to the score either side of lunch, and although Graham Thorpe provided support to Atherton(81), the captain's dismissal off the last ball of the first day saw England 148/4, needing to solidify to get a defendable score. This wasn't to be, as Bishop (5–32) and Benjamin (4–60) ripped through the middle and lower order in just over an hour on the second morning, and although Hooper fell to Malcolm's first ball in the reply, Sherwin Campbell and Brian Lara took the score to 95/2 at a real canter, Lara's 53 (10 fours) coming from just 55 balls before Richard Illingworth tempted him into coming down the wicket and his attempted drive was nicked to Hick at slip.

Campbell (69) and Jimmy Adams (58) continued the strokeplay, and Arthurton joined them to take the West Indies into a first innings lead, but before the close Adams mistimed a sweep off Hick for Martin to take a good catch and the latter continued Richardson's batting torments, trapping him leg before without scoring. The lower order put in some good efforts, but a collapse from 216/3 to 282 all out was disappointing, and it was left to the bowlers to repeat their first innings performance. Of the England batsmen only Thorpe (61) really found his feet, though he was as lucky as anyone – a mis-timed pull bounced back off the bottom of the stumps without disturbing the bails, and he survived again on the third evening when he was dropped at slip by Keith Arthurton. Despite a moderate wag from the tail that extended the innings from 136/6 to 208, it was still well short of par, and Walsh (4–60) and Ambrose (3–44) deserved the rewards of their efforts, coming out firing. Martin picked up Campbell early in the run chase, but Hooper (73* in 72 deliveries) and Lara (48 in 40) knocked off the 126 required without any further alarm.

=== 2nd Test ===
22–26 June 1995
Scorecard

England	v	West Indies
283 (99.4 overs); Robin Smith 61 (107); Courtney Walsh 3/50 (22.4 overs)		324 (112 overs); Keith Arthurton 75 (169); Angus Fraser 5/66 (33 overs)
336 (99.1 overs); Robin Smith 90 (227); Curtly Ambrose 4/70 (24 overs)		223 (78.3 overs); Sherwin Campbell 93 (222); Dominic Cork 7/43 (19.3 overs)

England won by 72 runs
Lord's, London
Umpires: David Shepherd (Eng) and Srinivasaraghavan Venkataraghavan (Ind)
Player of the match: Dominic Cork (Eng)

- England won the toss and elected to bat.

The second Test at Lord's proved to be a closer contest. Fraser was recalled to the side in place of Malcolm and Phillip DeFreitas was dropped for the umpteenth time to make way for debutant Dominic Cork. For the West Indies, Ottis Gibson made his Test debut and Benjamin missed out.

Atherton won the toss and elected to bat first, and although the West Indian bowlers made inroads either side of lunch it looked the right decision with Robin Smith (61) and Graham Thorpe (52) taking the score up to 185/3 just after the tea interval. The game then changed around – Smith and Mark Ramprakash were both deceived by Carl Hooper's off-spin and Thorpe and Darren Gough followed soon after, leaving the tail with some work. Cork and Martin added 50 for the eighth wicket, but England were disappointed with a total of 283 all out.

Gough and Fraser struck early in the West Indian first innings to leave the tourists 23/2, but Hooper (40), Jimmy Adams (54), Richardson (49) and Keith Arthurton (75) made significant contributions to a first innings lead of 41. Fraser was easily the pick of the England bowlers, sending down 33 overs during the innings and finishing with deserved figures of 5/66. The home side might have done even better had they held their catches – Arthurton was reprieved when still in single figures.

The second innings saw a superb partnership of 98 from Hick and Smith that solidified a slightly dodgy start that saw Walsh strike under gloomy grey skies. Atherton and Stewart had both been caught down the leg side by Junior Murray, and although Hick took the attack to the tall Jamaican, he had already send Thorpe to the ambulance first ball with a beamer that crashed into the side of his helmet. Hick (67) eventually succumbed to Bishop from around the wicket before bad light called a halt to proceedings on the third day, and Ramprakash was dispatched by the same bowler the next morning, which brought Thorpe back to the crease showing no ill effects from his overnight stay at St Mary's. Both men batted with confidence on a seaming pitch, and added 85 before Thorpe (42) was caught at gully by Richardson off Ambrose. Smith continued his fine form, adding a further 50 with Cork and 30 with Gough, but his dismissal for 90 (11 fours) saw the start of the collapse, and England fell from 320/6 to 336 all out.

By the close, Gough had picked up Hooper's wicket and the visitors needed a further 228 to win on the last day. They had moved on to 99 when Lara fell for 54, taken superbly in front of slip by a diving Stewart to set the ball rolling. Sherwin Campbell played an outstanding innings of 93 to keep the West Indians in the game for a long time, but the tourists were undone at the other end. Cork settled into a good rhythm and kept probing away with both natural away-swing and newly developed inswinger. Adams, Richardson and Arthurton disappeared in quick succession around the lunch break to make the crucial inroads into the middle order. Murray and the tail hung around tenaciously, each taking up valuable time, but after Campbell played uncharacteristically across the line and edged to Stewart, Ambrose and Walsh were quickly dismissed by the debutant, whose figures of 7/43 were well supported by Gough (3/79) and the workhorse Fraser.

The West Indies finished some 73 runs short of their target as England levelled the series, but this was a game that England won, rather than one that the visitors threw away.

- In Mark Ramprakash's pair, he was dismissed on the twelfth ball of each innings.

=== 3rd Test ===
6–8 July 1995
Scorecard

England	v	West Indies
147 (44.2 overs); Robin Smith 46 (92); Ian Bishop 3/18 (6.2 overs)		300 (98 overs); Sherwin Campbell 79 (140); Dominic Cork 4/69 (22 overs)
89 (30 overs); Robin Smith 41 (84); Courtney Walsh 5/45 (15 overs)

West Indies won by an innings and 64 runs
Edgbaston, Birmingham
Umpires: Mervyn Kitchen (Eng) and Ian Robinson (Zim)
Player of the match: Sherwin Campbell (WI)

- England won the toss and elected to bat.

The third Test at Edgbaston was dominated by the West Indies bowlers who took turns in dismissing the English batsmen, bowling them for 147 in the 1st innings and 89 in the 2nd innings and won by an innings and 64 runs despite setting a mediocre score of 300 and took a 2–1 lead into the fourth Test.

=== 4th Test ===
27–30 July 1995
Scorecard

West Indies	v	England
216 (60.2 overs); Brian Lara 87 (118); Angus Fraser 4/45 (16.2 overs)		437 (136 overs); Graham Thorpe 94 (147); Courtney Walsh 4/92 (38 overs)
314 (91.5 overs); Brian Lara 145 (226); Dominic Cork 4/111 (23.5 overs)		94/4 (35.5 overs); Mike Atherton 22 (40); Kenny Benjamin 2/29 (9 overs)

England won by 6 wickets
Old Trafford, Manchester
Umpires: Dickie Bird (Eng) and Cyril Mitchley (SA)
Player of the match: Dominic Cork (Eng)

- West Indies won the toss and elected to bat.

The fourth Test at Old Trafford was controlled by England where they developed a 221 run lead after the 1st innings. West Indies were bowled out for 314 runs and England won by 6 wickets after chasing a score of just 94. On day 4 of this Test Dominic Cork got a hat-trick by dismissing Richie Richardson (bowled), Junior Murray (lbw) and Carl Hooper (lbw). This was also the occasion where Cork, while batting in England's 1st innings, brushed his stumps with his foot and dislodged a bail. However, there was no appeal from the West Indies, so he replaced the bail and carried on batting.

=== 5th Test ===
10–14 August 1995
Scorecard

England	v	West Indies
440 (152.4 overs); Graeme Hick 118* (213); Kenny Benjamin 5/105 (34.3 overs)		417 (148.3 overs); Brian Lara 152 (182); Richard Illingworth 4/96 (51 overs)
269/9d (104 overs); Mike Watkinson 82* (137); Kenny Benjamin 5/69 (25 overs)		42/2 (11 overs); Brian Lara 20 (30); Angus Fraser 1/17 (6 overs)

Match drawn
Trent Bridge, Nottingham
Umpires: Cyril Mitchley (SA) and Nigel Plews (Eng)
Player of the match: Kenny Benjamin (WI)

- England won the toss and elected to bat.

=== 6th Test ===
24–28 August 1995
Scorecard

England	v	West Indies
454 (159 overs); Graeme Hick 96 (164); Curtly Ambrose 5/96 (42 overs)		692/8d (163 overs); Brian Lara 179 (206); Dominic Cork 3/145 (36 overs)
223/4 (98 overs); Mike Atherton 95 (269); Curtly Ambrose 2/35 (19 overs)

Match drawn
The Oval, London
Umpires: V. K. Ramaswamy (Ind) and David Shepherd (Eng)
Player of the match: Brian Lara (WI)

- England won the toss and elected to bat.
- Courtney Walsh (WI) took his 300th Test wicket during England's first innings.
- Alan Wells (Eng) played his only Test match.

The West Indies score of 692/8 declared is still the highest Test innings that did not feature an individual double-century scored by a batsman.
