= English cricket team in the West Indies in 1993–94 =

International cricket tour

| | England | West Indies |
- Dates: 23 January – 21 April 1994
| Captains | Mike Atherton | Richie Richardson |

Test series
- Result: West Indies won the 5-match series 3–1
| Most runs | Mike Atherton (510) | Brian Lara (798) |
| Most wickets | Andy Caddick (18) | Curtly Ambrose (26) |
- Player of the series: Curtly Ambrose

One Day International series
- Results: West Indies won the 5-match series 3–2
| Most runs | Mike Atherton (243) | Desmond Haynes (268) |
| Most wickets | Chris Lewis (9) | Anderson Cummins (9) |

The England cricket team toured the West Indies in the 1993–94 season. The tour consisted of five Test matches and five One Day Internationals as well as five other matches against first-class opposition. The fourth Test of the series, at Bridgetown, was the 700th Test match to be played by England.

The England team were captained by Mike Atherton in his first tour as captain, and they were looking to put their recent poor results behind them, and follow up on the Sixth Test victory over Australia. The only surprising element of the touring party was the omission of Peter Such, the leading wicket taker against Australia, in favour of the promising Ian Salisbury, though it seemed that Phil Tufnell was considered the senior spinner in the squad. In contrast to previous captain Graham Gooch, Atherton adopted a more relaxed approach to touring, allowing players time off rather than continual practicing, though perhaps Chris Lewis's decision to get his head shaved on a day off was a mistake – he spent a full day recovering from the subsequent sun-stroke.

The West Indies were defending a recent record on home turf that had seen them win twelve and drawing two of their previous fourteen home series. They were led by a weary Richie Richardson, who had complained prior to the series about the excessive amount of cricket that he and strike bowlers Curtly Ambrose and Courtney Walsh had been required to play in the previous twelve months. Veteran West Indian commentator Tony Cozier noted in the Independent that the supporting bowlers were "all worthy triers with modest county records who are unlikely to worry Atherton and his fellow batsmen". As it turned out, Winston Benjamin and Kenneth Benjamin both provided excellent back-up throughout the series, ending up with 12 and 22 wickets respectively, as the West Indies won the Test series 3–1.

England developed good positions in all of the first four Tests, but failed to capitalise, and struggled with confidence in key situations.

== Squads ==
The squads selected for the Test and One-day series were as follows:

England
- Mike Atherton (c)
- Jack Russell (wk)
- Andy Caddick
- Angus Fraser
- Graeme Hick
- Nasser Hussain
- Alan Igglesden
- Chris Lewis
- Devon Malcolm
- Matthew Maynard
- Mark Ramprakash
- Ian Salisbury
- Robin Smith
- Alec Stewart
- Graham Thorpe
- Phil Tufnell
- Steve Watkin
West Indies
- Richie Richardson (c)
- Junior Murray (wk)
- Jimmy Adams
- Curtly Ambrose
- Keith Arthurton
- Kenneth Benjamin
- Winston Benjamin
- Shivnarine Chanderpaul
- Anderson Cummins
- Roger Harper
- Desmond Haynes
- Roland Holder
- Brian Lara
- Phil Simmons
- Courtney Walsh
- Stuart Williams

== Warm-up matches ==
During the warm-up matches, John "The Dentist" Maynard came to international prominence. In the first, representing St Kitts and Nevis, he took three of the England top order wickets in the first innings, dismissing Michael Atherton, Matthew Maynard and Nasser Hussain. He finished with 3/91 as Mark Ramprakash took command, scoring 136. He then played for the Leeward Islands in the second, picking up the wickets of Graham Thorpe, Graeme Hick and Ramprakash. The seven top-order batsman had scored just 44 runs between them.

== Test series ==
=== 1st Test ===
19 – 24 February
Scorecard

| England | v | West Indies |
| 234 (98.1 overs); AJ Stewart 70 (118); KCG Benjamin 6/66 [24] | | 407 (123 overs); KLT Arthurton 126 (232); AR Caddick 3/94 [29] |
| 267 (91.5 overs); GA Hick 96 (187); WKM Benjamin 3/56 [20] | | 95/2 (26.2 overs); DL Haynes 43* (77); AR Caddick 1/19 [6] |

West Indies won by 8 wickets
Sabina Park, Kingston, Jamaica
Umpires: SA Bucknor (WI) and ID Robinson (Zim)
Player of the match: JC Adams (WI)

England came into the First Test with some confidence, having enjoyed a largely successful series of warm-up matches and winning the first One-day International. Captain Mike Atherton was in particularly good form with the bat at the top of the order. The England eleven contained four seamers and no specialist spinner, with Alan Igglesden getting the nod for the fourth spot ahead of the injured Angus Fraser (fractured finger) and Steve Watkin (back trouble). For the West Indies, Jimmy Adams came in for the injured Carl Hooper, while Winston and Kenny Benjamin provided the back-up seamer duties.

England won the toss and opted to bat first on a pretty benign pitch. Atherton (55) and Alec Stewart (70) made light work of the early going, advancing steadily throughout the first session. They added 121 for the first wicket but then the fireworks came. An hour before tea, Kenny Benjamin (6–66) had both openers caught behind by Junior Murray, then Robin Smith was clean bowled by Courtney Walsh for a duck. Graeme Hick and Graham Thorpe consolidated, before the former was winkled out by Adams, and Thorpe and Jack Russell followed with the score remaining on 172. Matthew Maynard dug in, but with wickets falling all around him, especially with Kenny Benjamin's impressive line and movement, he was unable to attack, and none of the tail could muster any significant support.

West Indies' reply looked equally sketchy when the opening tandem of Devon Malcolm and Andy Caddick removed the top three with only 23 on the scoreboard, but Brian Lara (83) and Keith Arthurton (126) did what West Indian batsmen have done often over the past two decades: they counter-attacked and put the pressure back on the bowlers. These two added 144, then Adams (95*) came to the party, and with excellent support from Murray and Winston Benjamin took the hosts to an impressive 389/6 before Caddick (3–94) and Chris Lewis combined to wrap the tail up.

England's second innings was a disappointment to rival the first – of the batsmen only Hick provided any real resistance, demonstrating a previously absent confidence against fast bowling. Coach Keith Fletcher noted at close of play on the third day that "if he can play that, he can play anything". He was aided by Lewis and Caddick, who each stuck around for more than an hour as he compiled 96, but ultimately it was a vain effort, as the visitors subsided to 267 all out. All four pace bowlers picked up wickets, with Walsh looking the most threatening and doing the damage at the top of the order. The victory target of 95 was achieved with little fuss, though Caddick and Igglesden took wickets along the way.

=== 2nd Test ===
17 – 22 March
Scorecard

| England | v | West Indies |
| 322 (124.5 overs); MA Atherton 144 (296); CEL Ambrose 4/58 [30] | | 556 (153.3 overs); BC Lara 167 (210); IDK Salisbury 4/163 [37] |
| 190 (85 overs); AJ Stewart 79 (137); KCG Benjamin 4/34 [19] |

West Indies won by an innings and 44 runs
Bourda, Georgetown, Guyana
Umpires: CR Duncan (WI) and S Venkataraghavan (Ind)
Player of the match: BC Lara (WI)

In the first Test played by England at Bourda since 1973–74, (Note: Due to the refusal of the Guyanese government to admit Robin Jackman the 1980–81 Test there would be cancelled, no Test in Guyana would be scheduled in England's 1985–86 tour, and the 1989–90 Test was abandoned without a ball bowled due to rain.) Shivnarine Chanderpaul made his Test debut for the West Indies on his home ground, replacing Phil Simmons, while Richardson moved up to open the innings with Desmond Haynes. For the tourists, Ian Salisbury came in for Caddick, and the impressive Malcolm was replaced by Fraser, with Maynard losing out to Mark Ramprakash for the sixth batting place.

England were inserted and started disastrously, losing Stewart and Ramprakash to Walsh's new ball spell before Atherton (144) and Smith (84) settled in, removed the shine and set about building the innings. They added 171 before Smith became the third man to fall, but Hick picked up from where he had left off at Sabina Park, compiling an innings of 33 that mixed aggression with temperance. Atherton was not out at the close on the first day, but Hick and Thorpe were both victims of the second new ball – Ambrose their tormentor this time around. The second morning was much less productive for the visitors, and although Lewis and Russell batted sensibly, they and final wicket Igglesden all fell with the score on 322. The West Indies openers saw off the new ball, and Haynes (63) and Lara (167) added their own century stand. Arthurton went cheaply, but Jimmy Adams justified his continued selection with a superb 137, his maiden test century, sharing partnerships of 112 with Lara, 126 with Chanderpaul (62) and 64 with Winston Benjamin, before being the last man out. Salisbury took four wickets but was very expensive, going at more than four an over.

England struggled to make up the deficit, slipping to 30/2 and 96/4, with Stewart (79) the only batsman to impress, and Ambrose (4–37) approaching his best as a bowler, demolishing the top order. Lewis and Salisbury batted stolidly for two hours for 35, but the tail couldn't wag any further, and Kenny Benjamin (4–34) finished it off without the West Indies having to bat again.

Post-match, Atherton identified the bowling as a key weakness in the England side, noting the speed with which the home team scored their runs, while Richardson mischievously targeted a 5–0 series whitewash.

=== 3rd Test ===
25 – 30 March
Scorecard

| West Indies | v | England |
| 252 (95.2 overs); RB Richardson 63 (172); ARC Fraser 4/49 [24] | | 328 (112.2 overs); GP Thorpe 86 (167); CEL Ambrose 5/60 [29] |
| 269 (87.5 overs); S Chanderpaul 50 (124); AR Caddick 6/65 [26] | | 46 (19.1 overs); AJ Stewart 18 (23); CEL Ambrose 6/24 [10] |

West Indies won by 147 runs
Queen's Park Oval, Port of Spain, Trinidad and Tobago
Umpires: SA Bucknor (WI) and S Venkataraghavan (Ind)
Player of the match: CEL Ambrose (WI)

Richardson won the toss and elected to bat, a decision that looked excellent as the captain (63), veteran opener Haynes and young star Lara guided the West Indies to 158/1. Salisbury, Lewis (4–61) and Fraser (4–49) precipitated a collapse though, and the home side ended the first day 227/7, and were soon dismissed on the second morning. England's reply looked equally sketchy in the early stages, subsiding to 115/4 at one stage, before, Hick (40), Thorpe (86), Russell and Salisbury guided them to a respectable total.

In the second innings, Caddick showed signs of returning to his best and took good advantage of the deterioration of the pitch, using good short-of-a-length deliveries to pick up six wickets and put England in a commanding position, needing just 194 to win. The target would have been even lower, if Hick had not dropped a catch offered by Chanderpaul, early in his innings shortly after the fifth wicket had fallen: instead Chanderpaul hung around to score his first Test fifty, and was ably supported by the tail, particularly Winston Benjamin (35), in putting over another hundred runs on the board. England's reply consequently began a couple of hours later in the day than they might have expected halfway through the West Indian innings, and with the Windies having recovered a good deal of confidence with their late-order tail-wagging having set England a more challenging target than they could have expected a couple of hours previously. Curtly Ambrose (6–24) was at his most devastating, removing Atherton with his first delivery and Smith not long afterwards: in between, Ramprakash was somewhat needlessly run out, putting England in dire straits. Only Stewart managed to get into double figures, and only he and Thorpe survived more than half an hour at the crease facing the menace of Walsh and Ambrose, and by the close on the fourth day, England were reeling at 40/8, still 5 short of their lowest score in Tests.

Walsh (3–16) picked up the last two wickets the next morning, as the tourists just scraped past their unwanted milestone, but they couldn't help feeling that this was a match they should have won. Captain Atherton noted that "we played well for three days", and journalist Alan Lee reported that England "are short not only of technical excellence but of mental resilience and self-belief" when the pressure is applied.

=== 4th Test ===
8 – 13 April
Scorecard

| England | v | West Indies |
| 355 (100.2 overs); AJ Stewart 118 (221); CEL Ambrose 4/86 [24.2] | | 304 (101.5 overs); S Chanderpaul 77 (231); ARC Fraser 8/75 [28.5] |
| 394/7d (108.5 overs); AJ Stewart 143 (319); CA Walsh 5/94 [28] | | 237 (82.2 overs); BC Lara 64 (89); AR Caddick 5/63 [17] |

England won by 208 runs
Kensington Oval, Bridgetown, Barbados
Umpires: LH Barker (WI) and DB Hair (Aus)
Player of the match: AJ Stewart (Eng)

England's preparation for the fourth test included a first-class match against a West Indies board side that pretty much outplayed the tourists, which was not what they had wanted, though Hick and Ramprakash both scored vital runs to help build their individual confidence.

That said, on being inserted, Atherton (85) and Stewart (118) set a superb base for the innings, batting through to the middle of the afternoon session and adding 171 for the first wicket. Stewart and Ramprakash added a further 52, but the middle order were unable to build on this and although several batsmen got starts, the tourists had to rely on Russell's 38 to shepherd the tail to a defendable total. Winston (3–76) and Kenny Benjamin (2–74) did the damage to the batsmen, while Ambrose helped himself to four more wickets from Hick, Russell and the tail.

England's bowlers made light of the West Indies vaunted batting line-up, with Fraser especially bringing some steel and determination to the attack. His 8–75 was testament to his perseverance, and was the best innings analysis by an England bowler since Bob Willis's destruction of the Australians at Headingley in 1981. Chanderpaul again defied his lack of experience with a four-hour 77, and he received sterling support from Ambrose (44) and Kenny Benjamin (43*) that dragged the total above 300.

Despite the losses of Atherton, Ramprakash and Smith leaving England 79/3, Stewart and Hick (59) worked hard to set the hosts a challenging target. They added 115 for the fourth wicket, and Stewart's 143 made him the seventh Englishman to score a century in both innings of a Test. Stewart and Thorpe (84) added another 150 and set up the declaration. Walsh was the most successful of the West Indies' bowlers, collecting five of the seven wickets to fall.

Needing 446 to win, the hosts were already without Haynes, who had suffered a hand injury in the first innings, and soon lost their remaining opener Richardson to injury too, struggling with a pulled hamstring. Adams and nightwatchman Kenny Benjamin were both dismissed before the close on the fourth day and although Lara and Arthurton steadied the ship somewhat, it wasn't enough to fend off the newly inspired Caddick (5–63), who received great support from the tireless Tufnell (3–100), as the West Indies were dismissed for 237.

England's victory marked the first by a visiting side in Barbados for 59 years, and broke a streak of twelve consecutive home victories at the ground. It also broke a streak of seven successive Test defeats for England away from home. "I had no doubts that we would lift our game here", Atherton reflected after the game. "It was a rarefied atmosphere out there this afternoon and our victory rates as a very sweet moment for me."

=== 5th Test ===
16 – 21 April
Scorecard

| West Indies | v | England |
| 593/5d (180.2 overs); BC Lara 375 (538); AR Caddick 3/158 [47.2] | | 593 (206.1 overs); RA Smith 175 (315); KCG Benjamin 4/110 [37] |
| 43/0 (24 overs); PV Simmons 22 (71) |

Match drawn
Antigua Recreation Ground, St. John's, Antigua and Barbuda
Umpires: SA Bucknor (WI) and DB Hair (Aus)
Player of the match: BC Lara (WI)

With Haynes and Richardson both absent after their injuries in the Barbados Test, the West Indies needed two new openers and drafted in Phil Simmons and debutant Stuart Williams to fill those roles. Courtney Walsh captained the side. England named an unchanged eleven.

Walsh won the toss and batted, and the two new openers were soon back in the pavilion, Caddick and Fraser picking up the wickets in their first spells, leaving the home side 12/2 and bringing Lara to the crease early in the day. By the close of play, he was still there, 164 not out, had added 179 with Jimmy Adams (59), and was already dominating his partnership with Keith Arthurton (47). These two added 187 for the fourth wicket as Lara despatched the bowling to all parts of the ground, his second century coming in just 131 balls. Chanderpaul (75*) joined him in the last session of the second day, as Lara progressed to 320, and they continued the next morning, adding a total of 219 before Lara was finally dismissed by Caddick for a new individual Test batting record of 375, and Walsh promptly declared.

Scenes on the ground were chaotic when Lara overtook the existing record of 365, as the batsmen embraced and the crowd rushed onto the field. Police held the mob back, and Sir Garfield Sobers, whose record Lara had broken, came out to the middle to congratulate Lara on the new record. Play was held up for about seven minutes. Lara's innings took twelve and three quarter hours and comprised 538 deliveries, 45 of which he struck for boundaries (all fours).

England's reply was subdued in comparison with the jubilant scenes they had just witnessed. Stewart and Ramprakash both got starts, but fell to Kenny Benjamin before they could progress. Atherton and Smith provided the English fans with a partnership of their own to celebrate, adding 303 for the third wicket in just short of seven hours. Smith (175) was the dominant partner, striking 16 fours and three sixes, and once he was out a flurry of wickets fell, the tourists going from 372/2 to 417/6, Atherton finally being dismissed after nine hours for a dogged 135. Russell (62) and Lewis (75*) added a century partnership as well, bringing England level with the West Indies total.

The match petered out on the final afternoon with Simmons and Williams not out and England using Stewart and Thorpe to bowl when the agreement to call it a draw finally came.

== ODI series ==
=== 1st ODI ===
16 February 1994
Scorecard

| England; 202/5 (50 overs) | v | West Indies; 141 (40.4 overs) |
| Michael Atherton 86 (146); Anderson Cummins 2/28 (10 overs) | | Jimmy Adams 29 (54); Chris Lewis 3/18 (8 overs) |

England won by 61 runs
Kensington Oval, Bridgetown, Barbados
Umpires: Lloyd Barker and Clyde Duncan
Player of the match: Michael Atherton (Eng)

- England won the toss and elected to bat.
- Alan Igglesden, Matthew Maynard and Steve Watkin made their One Day International debuts for England in this match.

=== 2nd ODI ===
26 February 1994
Scorecard

| England; 253/8 (50 overs) | v | West Indies; 240/7 (45.5/47 overs) |
| Alec Stewart 66 (88); Kenny Benjamin 3/44 (10 overs) | | Desmond Haynes 53 (83); Steve Watkin 4/49 (9.5 overs) |

West Indies won by 3 wickets (revised target)
Sabina Park, Kingston, Jamaica
Umpires: Lloyd Barker and Steve Bucknor
Player of the match: Jimmy Adams (West Indies)

- West Indies won the toss and elected to field
- West Indies set a target of 238 in 47 overs

=== 3rd ODI ===
2 March 1994
Scorecard

| West Indies; 313/6 (50 overs) | v | England; 148/9 (50 overs) |
| Desmond Haynes 83 (95); Phil Tufnell 2/52 (9 overs) | | Graeme Hick 32 (85); Brian Lara 2/5 (2 overs) |

West Indies won by 165 runs
Arnos Vale, Kingstown, Saint Vincent and the Grenadines
Umpires: Lloyd Barker and G.T. Johnson
Player of the match: Desmond Haynes (West Indies)

- England won the toss and elected to field

=== 4th ODI ===
5 March 1994
Scorecard

| West Indies; 265/7 (45.4 overs) | v | England; 193/9 (36 overs) |
| Desmond Haynes 115 (112); Angus Fraser 3/31 (10 overs) | | Robin Smith 45 (59); Roger Harper 4/40 (7 overs) |

West Indies won by 15 runs (revised target)
Queen's Park Oval, Port of Spain, Trinidad and Tobago
Umpires: Steve Bucknor and Clyde Cumberbatch
Player of the match: Desmond Haynes (West Indies)

- England won the toss and elected to field
- Rain stopped play after 45.4 overs, England set target of 209 in 36 overs

=== 5th ODI ===
6 March 1994
Scorecard

| West Indies; 250/9 (50 overs) | v | England; 201/5 (36.4/40 overs) |
| Phil Simmons 84 (104); Chris Lewis 4/35 (10 overs) | | Alec Stewart 53 (38); Anderson Cummins 2/36 (7.4 overs) |

England won by 5 wickets (revised target)
Queen's Park Oval, Port of Spain, Trinidad and Tobago
Umpires: Steve Bucknor and Clyde Cumberbatch
Player of the match: Alec Stewart (Eng)

- West Indies won the toss and elected to bat
- England set a target of 201 in 40 overs

== Tour overview and comments ==
=== England ===
The tour ended with more hope for the England team than could have been expected after the Third Test, when Richardson targeted a whitewash. Although they had played well in patches, they had not fulfilled their potential, and the final two tests provided something more of a measure of where the team stood when they performed at their best.

Alan Lee reported in The Times after the tour that the tour had achieved relatively little for England, with the #3 batting slot and the development of an all-rounder still at issue, as well as questions over the strength of the bowling attack. On the positive side he also noted Atherton's development as a captain and batsman, remarking that the Lancastrian "could captain England for years to come, not only because he is so young but because he plainly thrives on it" and that "his batting has flourished with the responsibility".

Atherton, Stewart and Hick did well with the bat, despite the capitulation in Trinidad, Stewart looking much more effective without wicketkeeping duties encumbering him, and Caddick (18 wickets) began to look threatening. Fraser bowled with heart and guts, as well as with occasional menace when conditions allowed, such as in Barbados, and took 16 well-deserved wickets. Tufnell bowled economically, but was rather underused.

The rest of the squad were disappointing though. Of the other batsmen, only Smith averaged over 30, and that was flattered by his big century at Antigua. He was in terrible form for the vast majority of the tour. Ramprakash averaged just over 10 in four Tests – a poor return for a man of his talents. None of the other bowlers impressed at all – Salisbury picked up seven wickets, but they were expensive, and Igglesden and Malcolm showed little to earn continued selection in the Tests in their brief appearances. Steve Watkin didn't even get that chance in the Test series, despite his fine end to the 1993 Ashes, after an early injury gave the impetus to others.

=== West Indies ===
The highlights of the West Indian side in the tour were clear. Brian Lara established himself as one of the world's pre-eminent batsmen with his triple century in Antigua, and was well supported by Jimmy Adams, Desmond Haynes and the emerging Shivnarine Chanderpaul. Curtly Ambrose spearheaded the attack to devastating effect at times, and when he was not totally on form the back up bowling, particularly of Kenny Benjamin, delivered to fill the gap.

The lack of a spin bowler did not hamper the West Indians in this series, but might be a concern for future tours, particularly of the Indian sub-continent. The fourth seamer spot may still also be up for grabs, despite Winston Banjamin's occasional success, and the lack of depth may be exposed if Ambrose and Walsh are unable to replicate their so-far excellent form.

== External sources ==
CricketArchive

== Bibliography ==
- Playfair Cricket Annual 1994, 1995, Headline Press (Ed. Bill Frindall)
- Wisden Cricketers Almanack 1995
