= List of West Indies ODI cricketers =

This is a list of West Indian One-day International cricketers. A One Day International (ODI) is an international cricket match between two representative teams, each having ODI status, as determined by the International Cricket Council (ICC). An ODI differs from Test matches in that the number of overs per team is limited, and that each team has only one innings. The list is arranged in the order in which each player won his first ODI cap. Where more than one player won his first ODI cap in the same match, those players are listed alphabetically by surname.

== Key ==
General

- † – Wicket-keeper
- First – Year of debut
- Last – Year of latest game
- Mat – Number of matches played

Batting

- Runs – Runs scored in career
- HS – Highest score
- Avg – Runs scored per dismissal
- * – Batsman remained not out
- 100 – Number of centuries scored
- 50 – Number of half centuries scored

Bowling

- Balls – Balls bowled in career
- Wkt – Wickets taken in career
- BBI – Best bowling in an innings
- Ave – Average runs per wicket
- 5WI – Five wickets or more in a match

Fielding

- Ca – Catches taken
- St – Stumpings taken

== Players ==
Statistics are correct as of 22 November 2025.

West Indies ODI cricketers
General					Batting					Bowling					Fielding	
Cap	Name	First	Last	Mat	Runs	HS	Avg	50	100	Balls	Wkt	BBI	Ave	5WI	Ca	St
1	Keith Boyce	1973	1975	8	57	34	14.25	0	0	470	13	4/50	24.07	0	0	—
2	Maurice Foster	1973	1973	2	25	25	25.00	0	0	30	2	2/22	11.00	0	0	—
3	Roy Fredericks	1973	1977	12	311	105	25.91	1	1	10	2	2/10	5.00	0	4	—
4	Lance Gibbs	1973	1975	3	0	0*	—	0	0	156	2	1/12	29.50	0	0	—
5	Vanburn Holder	1973	1978	12	64	30	12.80	0	0	681	19	5/50	23.89	1	6	—
6	Bernard Julien	1973	1977	12	86	26*	14.33	0	0	778	18	4/20	25.72	0	4	—
7	Alvin Kallicharran	1973	1981	31	826	78	34.41	6	0	105	3	2/10	21.33	0	8	—
8	Rohan Kanhai	1973	1975	7	164	55	54.66	2	0	—	—	—	—	—	4	—
9	Clive Lloyd	1973	1985	87	1977	102	39.54	11	1	358	8	2/4	26.25	0	39	—
10	Deryck Murray †	1973	1980	26	294	61*	24.50	2	0	—	—	—	—	—	37	1
11	Garfield Sobers	1973	1973	1	0	0	0.00	0	0	63	1	1/31	31.00	0	1	—
12	Ron Headley	1973	1973	1	19	19	19.00	0	0	—	—	—	—	—	0	—
13	David Murray	1973	1981	10	45	35	9.00	0	0	—	—	—	—	—	16	—
14	Viv Richards	1975	1991	187	6721	189*	47.00	45	11	5644	118	6/41	35.83	2	100	—
15	Andy Roberts	1975	1983	56	231	37*	10.04	0	0	3123	87	5/22	20.35	1	6	—
16	Gordon Greenidge	1975	1991	128	5134	133*	45.03	31	11	60	1	1/21	45.00	0	45	—
17	Lawrence Rowe	1975	1980	11	136	60	17.00	1	0	—	—	—	—	—	2	—
18	Michael Holding	1976	1987	102	282	64	9.09	2	0	5473	142	5/26	21.36	1	30	—
19	Collis King	1976	1980	18	280	86	23.33	1	0	744	11	4/23	48.09	0	6	—
20	Colin Croft	1977	1981	19	18	8	9.00	0	0	1070	30	6/15	20.66	1	1	—
21	Joel Garner	1977	1987	98	239	37	9.19	0	0	5330	146	5/31	18.84	3	30	—
22	Richard Austin	1978	1978	1	8	8	8.00	0	0	6	0	—	—	—	0	—
23	Faoud Bacchus	1978	1983	29	612	80*	26.60	3	0	—	—	—	—	—	10	—
24	Wayne Daniel	1978	1984	18	49	16*	49.00	0	0	912	23	3/27	25.86	0	5	—
25	Desmond Haynes	1978	1994	238	8648	152*	41.37	57	17	30	0	—	—	—	59	—
26	Irvine Shillingford	1978	1978	2	30	24	15.00	0	0	—	—	—	—	—	2	—
27	Sylvester Clarke	1978	1982	10	60	20	10.00	0	0	524	13	3/22	18.84	0	4	—
28	Larry Gomes	1978	1987	83	1415	101	28.87	6	1	1345	41	4/31	25.48	0	14	—
29	Alvin Greenidge	1978	1978	1	23	23	23.00	0	0	—	—	—	—	—	0	—
30	Derick Parry	1978	1980	6	61	32	15.25	0	0	330	11	3/47	23.54	0	8	—
31	Norbert Phillip	1978	1978	1	0	0*	0.00	0	0	42	1	1/22	22.00	0	0	—
32	Sew Shivnarine	1978	1978	1	20	20*	—	0	0	18	0	—	—	—	0	—
33	Malcolm Marshall	1980	1992	136	955	66	14.92	2	0	7175	157	4/18	26.96	0	15	—
34	Milton Pydanna †	1980	1983	3	2	2*	—	0	0	—	—	—	—	—	2	1
35	Everton Mattis	1981	1981	2	86	62	43.00	1	0	—	—	—	—	—	2	—
36	Jeff Dujon †	1981	1991	169	1945	82*	23.15	6	0	—	—	—	—	—	183	21
37	Gus Logie	1981	1993	158	2809	109*	28.95	14	1	24	0	—	—	—	61	—
38	Winston Davis	1983	1988	35	28	10	14.00	0	0	1923	39	7/51	33.38	1	1	—
39	Eldine Baptiste	1983	1990	43	184	31	15.33	0	0	2214	36	2/10	41.97	0	14	—
40	Roger Harper	1983	1996	105	855	45*	16.13	0	0	5175	100	4/40	34.31	0	55	—
41	Richie Richardson	1983	1996	224	6248	122	33.41	44	5	58	1	1/4	46.00	0	75	—
42	Richard Gabriel	1984	1984	11	167	41	15.18	0	0	—	—	—	—	—	1	—
43	Milton Small	1984	1984	2	—	—	—	—	—	84	1	1/40	54.00	0	1	—
44	Thelston Payne	1984	1987	7	126	60	31.50	1	0	—	—	—	—	—	6	—
45	Courtney Walsh	1985	2000	205	321	30	6.97	0	0	10822	227	5/1	30.47	1	27	—
46	Tony Gray	1985	1991	25	51	10*	8.50	0	0	1270	44	6/50	18.97	1	3	—
47	Patrick Patterson	1986	1993	59	44	13*	8.80	0	0	3050	90	6/29	24.51	1	9	—
48	Carlisle Best	1986	1992	24	473	100	24.89	2	1	19	0	—	—	—	5	—
49	Winston Benjamin	1986	1995	85	298	31	7.45	0	0	4442	100	5/22	30.79	1	16	—
50	Carl Hooper	1987	2003	227	5761	113*	35.34	29	7	9573	193	4/34	36.05	0	120	—
51	Phil Simmons	1987	1999	143	3675	122	28.93	18	5	3880	83	4/3	34.65	0	55	—
52	David Williams †	1988	1997	36	147	32*	9.18	0	0	—	—	—	—	—	35	10
53	Curtly Ambrose	1988	2000	176	639	31*	10.65	0	0	9353	225	5/17	24.12	4	45	—
54	Ian Bishop	1988	1997	84	405	33*	16.20	0	0	4332	118	5/25	26.50	1	12	—
55	Keith Arthurton	1988	1999	105	1904	84	26.08	9	0	1384	42	4/31	27.59	0	27	—
56	Robert Haynes	1989	1991	8	26	18	5.20	0	0	270	5	2/36	44.80	0	5	—
57	Ezra Moseley	1990	1991	9	7	2*	1.75	0	0	330	7	2/52	39.71	0	0	—
58	Clayton Lambert^{1}	1990	1998	11	368	119	33.45	2	1	12	0	—	—	—	0	—
59	Brian Lara^{2}	1990	2007	295	10348	169	40.90	62	19	49	4	2/5	15.25	0	117	—
60	Anderson Cummins	1991	1995	63	459	44*	15.30	0	0	3143	78	5/31	28.79	1	11	—
61	Philo Wallace	1991	2000	33	701	103	21.24	2	1	—	—	—	—	—	11	—
62	Kenny Benjamin	1992	1996	26	65	17	10.83	0	0	1319	33	3/34	27.96	0	4	—
63	Junior Murray †	1992	1999	55	678	86	22.60	5	0	—	—	—	—	—	46	7
64	Jimmy Adams	1992	2001	127	2204	82	28.62	14	0	1856	43	5/37	34.86	1	68	5
65	Roland Holder	1993	1997	37	599	65	23.96	2	0	—	—	—	—	—	8	—
66	Shivnarine Chanderpaul	1994	2011	268	8778	150	41.60	59	11	740	14	3/18	45.42	0	73	—
67	Cameron Cuffy	1994	2002	41	62	17*	4.42	0	0	2153	41	4/24	35.02	0	5	—
68	Stuart Williams	1994	1999	57	1586	105*	32.36	12	1	24	1	1/30	30.00	0	18	—
69	Barrington Browne	1994	1994	4	8	8*	8.00	0	0	180	2	2/50	78.00	0	0	—
70	Sherwin Campbell	1994	2001	90	2283	105	26.24	14	2	196	8	4/30	21.25	0	23	—
71	Rajindra Dhanraj	1994	1995	6	8	8	8.00	0	0	264	10	4/26	17.00	0	1	—
72	Vasbert Drakes	1995	2004	34	94	25	7.83	0	0	1640	51	5/33	25.35	2	5	—
73	Ottis Gibson	1995	1997	15	141	52	14.10	1	0	739	34	5/40	18.26	2	3	—
74	Hamish Anthony	1995	1995	3	23	21	7.66	0	0	156	3	2/47	47.66	0	0	—
75	Courtney Browne †	1995	2005	46	415	46*	17.29	0	0	—	—	—	—	—	59	9
76	Ridley Jacobs †	1996	2004	147	1865	80*	23.31	9	0	—	—	—	—	—	160	29
77	Laurie Williams	1996	2001	15	124	41	11.27	0	0	659	18	3/16	30.88	0	8	—
78	Nixon McLean	1996	2003	45	314	50*	12.07	1	0	2120	46	3/21	37.58	0	8	—
79	Robert Samuels	1996	1997	8	54	36*	18.00	0	0	—	—	—	—	—	1	—
80	Adrian Griffith	1996	2000	9	99	47	14.14	0	0	—	—	—	—	—	5	—
81	Patterson Thompson	1997	1997	2	2	2	2.00	0	0	114	2	1/46	55.00	0	0	—
82	Franklyn Rose	1997	2000	27	217	30	12.05	0	0	1326	29	5/23	36.06	1	6	—
83	Dinanath Ramnarine	1997	2001	4	5	2	1.66	0	0	200	3	2/52	54.66	0	0	—
84	Floyd Reifer	1997	2009	8	117	40	14.62	0	0	—	—	—	—	—	3	—
85	Rawl Lewis	1997	2006	28	291	49	18.18	0	0	1150	22	3/43	44.68	0	7	—
86	Mervyn Dillon	1997	2005	108	227	21*	7.32	0	0	5480	130	5/29	32.44	3	20	—
87	Neil McGarrell	1998	2001	17	60	19	7.50	0	0	859	15	3/32	45.40	0	9	—
88	Carl Tuckett	1998	1998	1	—	—	—	—	—	48	2	2/41	20.50	0	0	—
89	Reon King	1998	2005	50	65	12*	7.22	0	0	2603	76	4/25	23.77	0	4	—
90	Keith Semple	1999	1999	7	64	23	10.66	0	0	132	3	2/35	40.33	0	2	—
91	Daren Ganga	1999	2006	35	843	71	25.54	9	0	1	0	—	—	—	11	—
92	Henderson Bryan	1999	1999	15	43	11	7.16	0	0	722	12	4/24	43.16	0	4	—
93	Nehemiah Perry	1999	2000	21	212	52*	26.50	1	0	946	20	3/45	39.15	0	4	—
94	Ricardo Powell	1999	2005	109	2085	124	24.82	8	1	473	11	2/5	44.63	0	43	—
95	Wavell Hinds	1999	2010	119	2880	127*	28.51	14	5	945	28	3/24	29.89	0	28	—
96	Corey Collymore	1999	2007	84	104	13*	5.77	0	0	4074	83	5/51	35.22	1	12	—
97	Chris Gayle^{2}	1999	2019	298	10425	215	38.04	53	25	7377	167	5/46	35.13	1	123	—
98	Pedro Collins	1999	2005	30	30	10*	4.28	0	0	1577	39	5/43	31.07	1	8	—
99	Sylvester Joseph	2000	2005	13	161	58	16.10	1	0	—	—	—	—	—	4	—
100	Mahendra Nagamootoo	2000	2002	24	162	33	13.50	0	0	1189	18	4/32	55.44	0	6	—
101	Ramnaresh Sarwan	2000	2013	181	5804	120*	42.67	38	5	581	16	3/31	36.62	0	45	—
102	Kerry Jeremy	2000	2001	6	17	8*	8.50	0	0	192	4	2/42	40.75	0	0	—
103	Marlon Samuels	2000	2018	207	5606	133*	32.97	30	10	5091	89	3/25	46.37	0	50	—
104	Marlon Black	2001	2001	5	4	4	2.00	0	0	228	0	—	—	—	0	—
105	Colin Stuart	2001	2001	5	3	3*	—	0	0	258	8	5/44	25.62	1	1	—
106	Leon Garrick	2001	2001	3	99	76	33.00	1	0	—	—	—	—	—	0	—
107	Jermaine Lawson	2001	2005	13	18	8	6.00	0	0	558	17	4/57	29.29	0	0	—
108	Darryl Brown	2001	2002	3	10	9	10.00	0	0	150	5	3/21	24.80	0	0	—
109	Ryan Hinds	2001	2004	14	101	18*	16.83	0	0	407	6	2/19	58.33	0	2	—
110	Runako Morton	2002	2010	56	1519	110*	33.75	10	2	6	0	—	—	—	20	—
111	Daren Powell	2002	2009	55	118	48*	5.36	0	0	2850	71	4/27	31.53	0	13	—
112	Omari Banks	2003	2005	5	83	33	16.60	0	0	270	7	2/24	27.00	0	0	—
113	Carlton Baugh †	2003	2012	47	482	49	20.08	0	0	—	—	—	—	—	39	12
114	Devon Smith	2003	2013	47	1059	107	24.62	5	1	17	0	—	—	—	13	—
115	Ryan Hurley	2003	2004	9	13	6	3.25	0	0	378	5	1/25	62.60	0	5	—
116	David Bernard	2003	2003	4	7	7	3.50	0	0	24	1	1/11	28.00	0	1	—
117	Jerome Taylor	2003	2017	90	278	43*	8.42	0	0	4341	128	5/48	29.53	1	20	—
118	Ravi Rampaul	2003	2013	92	362	86*	12.48	1	0	4033	117	5/49	29.35	2	14	—
119	Fidel Edwards	2003	2009	50	73	13	9.12	0	0	2138	60	6/22	30.20	2	4	—
120	Dwayne Smith	2004	2015	105	1560	97	18.57	8	0	2726	61	5/45	37.45	1	31	—
121	Dwayne Bravo	2004	2014	164	2968	112*	25.36	10	2	6511	199	6/43	29.51	1	73	—
122	Ian Bradshaw	2004	2007	62	287	37	12.47	0	0	3172	78	3/15	29.47	0	6	—
123	Tino Best	2004	2014	26	76	24	9.50	0	0	1300	34	4/35	34.02	0	4	—
124	Daren Sammy	2004	2015	126	1871	89	24.94	9	0	4956	81	4/26	47.54	0	67	—
125	Xavier Marshall^{1}	2005	2009	24	375	157*	17.85	0	1	9	0	—	—	—	9	—
126	Narsingh Deonarine	2005	2005	31	682	65*	26.23	4	0	501	6	2/18	79.16	0	9	—
127	Denesh Ramdin †	2005	2015	139	2200	169	25.00	8	2	—	—	—	—	—	181	7
128	Deighton Butler	2005	2006	5	25	13*	25.00	0	0	246	3	1/25	62.66	0	0	—
129	Ryan Ramdass	2005	2005	1	1	1	1.00	0	0	—	—	—	—	—	0	—
130	Sewnarine Chattergoon	2006	2009	18	370	54*	24.66	2	0	80	1	1/1	48.00	0	6	—
131	Dave Mohammed	2006	2008	7	0	0*	—	0	0	353	10	3/37	23.50	0	1	—
132	Lendl Simmons	2006	2015	68	1958	122	31.58	16	2	156	1	1/3	172.00	0	28	—
133	Rayad Emrit	2007	2007	2	13	13	13.00	0	0	84	0	—	—	—	1	—
134	Kieron Pollard ‡	2007	2022	123	2706	119	26.01	13	3	2275	55	3/27	39.29	0	64	—
135	Austin Richards	2007	2007	1	2	2	2.00	0	0	—	—	—	—	—	1	—
136	Brenton Parchment	2007	2008	7	122	48	17.42	0	0	—	—	—	—	—	1	—
137	Patrick Browne	2008	2008	5	134	49*	33.50	0	0	—	—	—	—	—	2	—
138	Sulieman Benn	2008	2016	47	182	31	7.91	0	0	2387	39	4/18	49.05	0	9	—
139	Andre Fletcher †	2008	2016	25	354	54	14.16	2	0	28	0	—	—	—	5	3
140	Shawn Findlay	2008	2009	9	146	59*	20.85	1	0	—	—	—	—	—	5	—
141	Nikita Miller	2008	2018	50	284	51	20.28	1	0	2125	45	4/43	36.88	0	18	—
142	Leon Johnson	2008	2008	6	98	51	16.33	1	0	—	—	—	—	—	2	—
143	Brendan Nash	2008	2009	9	104	39*	26.00	0	0	294	5	3/56	44.80	0	1	—
144	Kemar Roach	2008	2022	95	308	34	12.83	0	0	4579	125	6/27	31.08	3	22	—
145	Lionel Baker	2008	2009	10	13	11*	6.50	0	0	426	11	3/47	32.27	0	1	—
146	Darren Bravo	2009	2022	122	3109	124	30.18	18	4	—	—	—	—	—	35	—
147	Travis Dowlin	2009	2010	11	228	100*	25.33	1	1	—	—	—	—	—	2	—
148	Nelon Pascal	2009	2009	1	0	0	0.00	0	0	24	0	—	—	—	0	—
149	Dale Richards	2009	2010	8	179	59	25.57	2	0	—	—	—	—	—	3	—
150	Devon Thomas †	2009	2013	21	238	37	14.00	0	0	7	2	2/11	5.50	0	23	6
151	Gavin Tonge	2009	2009	5	10	5	5.00	0	0	300	5	4/25	44.80	0	0	—
152	Kieran Powell	2009	2018	46	1005	83	22.84	9	0	—	—	—	—	—	14	—
153	Chadwick Walton †	2009	2017	9	53	19	6.62	0	0	—	—	—	—	—	9	1
154	Royston Crandon	2009	2009	1	5	5	5.00	0	0	—	—	—	—	—	0	—
155	Adrian Barath	2010	2012	14	394	113	30.30	1	1	—	—	—	—	—	3	—
156	Andre Russell	2011	2019	56	1034	92*	27.21	4	0	2290	70	4/35	31.84	0	11	—
157	Devendra Bishoo	2011	2019	42	164	29*	10.93	0	0	2022	38	3/30	43.89	0	7	—
158	Kirk Edwards	2011	2014	16	331	123*	23.64	0	1	—	—	—	—	—	2	—
159	Anthony Martin	2011	2011	9	10	4*	10.00	0	0	444	11	4/36	26.90	0	3	—
160	Danza Hyatt	2011	2011	9	112	39	14.00	0	0	—	—	—	—	—	1	—
161	Carlos Brathwaite	2011	2019	44	559	101	16.44	1	1	1825	43	5/27	41.06	1	11	—
162	Sunil Narine	2011	2016	65	363	36	11.00	0	0	3540	92	6/27	26.46	2	14	—
163	Jason Mohammed	2011	2021	36	630	91*	21.72	4	0	440	8	3/47	42.50	0	4	—
164	Johnson Charles †	2012	2023	58	1537	130	26.50	7	2	5	0	—	—	—	25	2
165	Veerasammy Permaul	2012	2017	7	19	10	6.33	0	0	331	8	3/40	30.00	0	1	—
166	Jason Holder	2013	2023	138	2237	99*	24.85	12	0	6402	159	5/27	36.96	2	65	—
167	Miguel Cummins	2014	2017	11	10	5	5.00	0	0	450	9	3/82	52.66	0	1	—
168	Jonathan Carter	2015	2019	33	581	54	23.24	3	0	136	4	2/14	40.00	0	7	—
169	Sheldon Cottrell	2015	2021	38	88	17	11.00	0	0	1722	52	5/46	32.40	1	19	—
170	Jermaine Blackwood	2015	2022	3	23	12*	11.50	0	0	18	0	—	—	—	2	—
171	Shannon Gabriel	2016	2019	25	24	12*	3.42	0	0	1148	33	3/17	34.36	0	1	—
172	Kraigg Brathwaite	2016	2017	10	278	78	27.80	1	0	152	1	1/56	140.00	0	3	—
173	Alzarri Joseph	2016	2025	81	489	49	16.30	0	0	4053	133	5/56	27.88	1	24	—
174	Evin Lewis	2016	2025	70	2279	176*	36.75	12	5	—	—	—	—	—	27	—
175	Shai Hope †	2016	2025	148	6113	170	50.52	30	19	—	—	—	—	—	152	15
176	Ashley Nurse	2016	2019	54	502	44	19.30	0	0	2384	49	4/51	43.36	0	15	—
177	Rovman Powell	2016	2023	51	979	101	21.75	2	1	280	3	1/7	91.66	0	16	—
178	Roston Chase	2017	2025	69	1158	94	25.73	6	0	2488	45	3/30	45.37	0	33	—
179	Kyle Hope	2017	2017	7	138	46	23.00	0	0	—	—	—	—	—	1	—
180	Kesrick Williams	2017	2018	8	19	16*	19.00	0	0	330	9	4/43	32.55	0	0	—
181	Sunil Ambris	2017	2021	16	473	148	36.38	2	1	—	—	—	—	—	2	—
182	Ronsford Beaton	2017	2017	2	15	12*	15.00	0	0	102	1	1/60	102.00	0	0	—
183	Shimron Hetmyer	2017	2025	57	1543	139	31.48	4	5	—	—	—	—	—	23	—
184	Keemo Paul	2018	2023	30	320	46	21.33	0	0	1253	34	3/34	36.40	0	15	—
185	Chandrapaul Hemraj	2018	2018	6	82	32	13.66	0	0	7	0	—	—	—	2	—
186	Oshane Thomas	2018	2024	25	22	7	3.66	0	0	920	31	5/21	33.35	1	0	—
187	Obed McCoy	2018	2018	2	0	0*	—	0	0	84	4	2/38	27.25	0	0	—
188	Fabian Allen	2018	2022	20	200	51	15.38	1	0	666	7	2/40	89.57	0	10	—
189	John Campbell	2019	2025	9	282	179	35.25	0	1	6	0	—	—	—	0	—
190	Nicholas Pooran ‡†	2019	2023	61	1983	118	39.65	11	3	169	6	4/48	29.00	0	23	2
191	Shane Dowrich	2019	2019	1	6	6*	6.00	0	0	—	—	—	—	—	0	—
192	Raymon Reifer	2019	2023	6	51	27	10.19	0	0	161	6	2/23	24.83	0	0	—
193	Romario Shepherd	2019	2025	42	455	50	17.50	1	0	1564	34	3/37	42.05	0	5	—
194	Hayden Walsh Jr.^{1}	2019	2024	24	149	46*	14.90	0	0	1081	28	5/39	35.75	1	4	—
195	Brandon King	2019	2025	58	1530	112	27.32	8	3	—	—	—	—	—	21	—
196	Khary Pierre	2019	2025	7	70	22*	35.00	0	0	336	2	1/19	133.00	0	6	—
197	Nkrumah Bonner	2021	2022	6	85	31	17.00	0	0	65	1	1/29	55.00	0	1	—
198	Joshua Da Silva †	2021	2021	2	14	9	7.00	0	0	—	—	—	—	—	1	1
199	Chemar Holder	2021	2021	1	0	0*	—	0	0	18	0	—	—	0	0	—
200	Akeal Hosein	2021	2025	40	309	60	14.71	1	0	2210	63	4/39	28.07	0	17	—
201	Andre McCarthy	2021	2021	2	12	15	7.50	0	0	12	0	—	—	0	0	—
202	Kyle Mayers	2021	2023	28	660	120	25.38	2	2	686	14	2/30	45.14	0	10	—
203	Kjorn Ottley	2021	2024	4	41	24	10.25	0	0	—	—	—	—	—	1	—
204	Jahmar Hamilton †	2021	2021	1	5	5	5.00	0	0	—	—	—	—	—	—	—
205	Keon Harding	2021	2021	1	1	1*	—	0	0	60	0	—	—	0	0	—
206	Anderson Phillip	2021	2022	5	22	21*	22.00	3	1	195	4	2/50	51.75	0	2	—
207	Shamarh Brooks	2022	2023	29	842	101*	30.07	4	1	—	—	—	—	—	14	—
208	Justin Greaves	2022	2025	21	429	50	28.60	1	0	456	8	2/32	63.62	0	8	—
209	Odean Smith	2022	2023	9	199	46	28.42	0	0	283	10	2/26	26.10	0	1	—
210	Keacy Carty	2022	2025	46	1593	170	41.92	5	4	25	0	—	—	0	8	—
211	Jayden Seales	2022	2025	29	56	29*	9.93	0	0	1231	40	6/18	30.07	0	7	—
212	Shermon Lewis	2022	2022	1	—	—	—	—	—	59	3	3/67	22.33	0	3	—
213	Gudakesh Motie	2022	2025	34	357	63	22.31	2	0	1669	42	4/23	31.47	0	18	—
214	Yannic Cariah	2022	2023	14	93	52	15.50	1	0	597	13	2/26	47.84	0	3	—
215	Kevin Sinclair	2022	2023	7	38	25	19.00	0	0	381	11	4/24	25.63	6	0	—
216	Dominic Drakes	2023	2023	3	11	8	5.50	0	0	114	2	2/29	36.50	0	1	—
217	Kavem Hodge	2023	2024	4	37	26	12.33	0	0	108	2	2/46	56.50	0	0	—
218	Akeem Jordan	2023	2023	2	3	3*	—	0	0	66	1	1/36	56.00	0	2	—
219	Alick Athanaze	2023	2025	17	405	66	23.82	2	0	126	0	2/14	17.50	0	8	—
220	Sherfane Rutherford	2023	2025	22	743	113	43.70	7	1	107	3	1/24	51.33	0	8	—
221	Matthew Forde	2023	2025	16	193	58	20.66	1	0	693	22	3/29	31.54	0	6	—
222	Teddy Bishop	2024	2024	1	0	0	0.00	0	0	—	—	—	—	—	0	—
223	Jewel Andrew	2024	2025	3	8	8*	4.00	0	0	—	—	—	—	—	0	—
224	Shamar Joseph	2024	2025	6	11	8	11.00	0	0	251	4	2/65	67.50	1	0	—
225	Marquino Mindley	2024	2024	1	—	—	—	—	—	42	1	1/45	45.00	0	0	—
226	Jediah Blades	2024	2025	3	0	0	0.00	0	0	120	1	1/46	172.00	0	0	—
227	Amir Jangoo	2024	2025	5	153	104*	38.25	0	1	—	—	—	—	—	0	—
228	Ackeem Auguste	2025	2025	4	56	22	14.00	0	0	—	—	—	—	—	3	—
229	Shamar Springer	2025	2025	3	18	12	6.00	0	0	114	2	1/16	66.50	0	1	—

Notes:

- ^{1} Clayton Lambert, Xavier Marshall and Hayden Walsh Jr. also played ODI cricket for United States. Only their records for West Indies are given above.
- ^{2} Brian Lara and Chris Gayle also played ODI cricket for ICC World XI. Only their records for West Indies are given above.

== Captains ==
This is a complete list of every man who has captained the West Indies in at least one One Day International. Updated to 22 November 2025.

West Indian ODI captains
Number	Name	Period of captaincy	Played	Won	Lost	Tied	No result
1	Rohan Kanhai	1973	2	1	1	0	0
2	Clive Lloyd	1975–1985	84	64	18	1	1
3	Deryck Murray	1978–1979	2	2	0	0	0
4	Alvin Kallicharran	1978	1	0	1	0	0
5	Viv Richards	1980–1991	105	67	36	0	2
6	Michael Holding	1984	2	2	0	0	0
7	Gordon Greenidge	1988	8	6	2	0	0
8	Desmond Haynes	1989–1993	7	3	4	0	0
9	Jeff Dujon	1990	1	1	0	0	0
10	Richie Richardson	1991–1996	87	46	36	3	2
11	Courtney Walsh	1994–1997	43	22	20	0	1
12	Brian Lara	1994–2007	125	59	59	0	7
13	Carl Hooper	1997–2003	49	23	24	0	2
14	Jimmy Adams	1999–2001	26	10	14	1	1
15	Sherwin Campbell	2001	1	0	1	0	0
16	Ridley Jacobs	2002	4	2	1	0	1
17	Ramnaresh Sarwan	2004–2008	5	4	1	0	0
18	Shivnarine Chanderpaul	2005–2006	16	2	14	0	0
19	Sylvester Joseph	2005	1	0	1	0	0
20	Chris Gayle	2007–2010	53	17	30	0	6
21	Dwayne Bravo	2007–2014	37	17	18	2	0
22	Floyd Reifer	2009	6	0	6	0	0
23	Daren Sammy	2010–2013	51	19	30	1	1
24	Denesh Ramdin	2011	1	1	0	0	0
25	Kieron Pollard	2013–2022	24	13	11	0	0
26	Jason Holder	2015–2019	86	24	54	2	6
27	Marlon Samuels	2015	1	0	1	0	0
28	Jason Mohammed	2017–2021	4	0	4	0	0
29	Rovman Powell	2018	3	1	2	1	0
30	Nicholas Pooran	2022	17	4	13	0	0
31	Shai Hope	2023–2025	44	18	23	2	1
32	Roston Chase	2023	1	1	0	0	0

== See also ==
- One Day International
- West Indian cricket team
