= 1993 Hero Cup =

International cricket tournament

Hero Cup
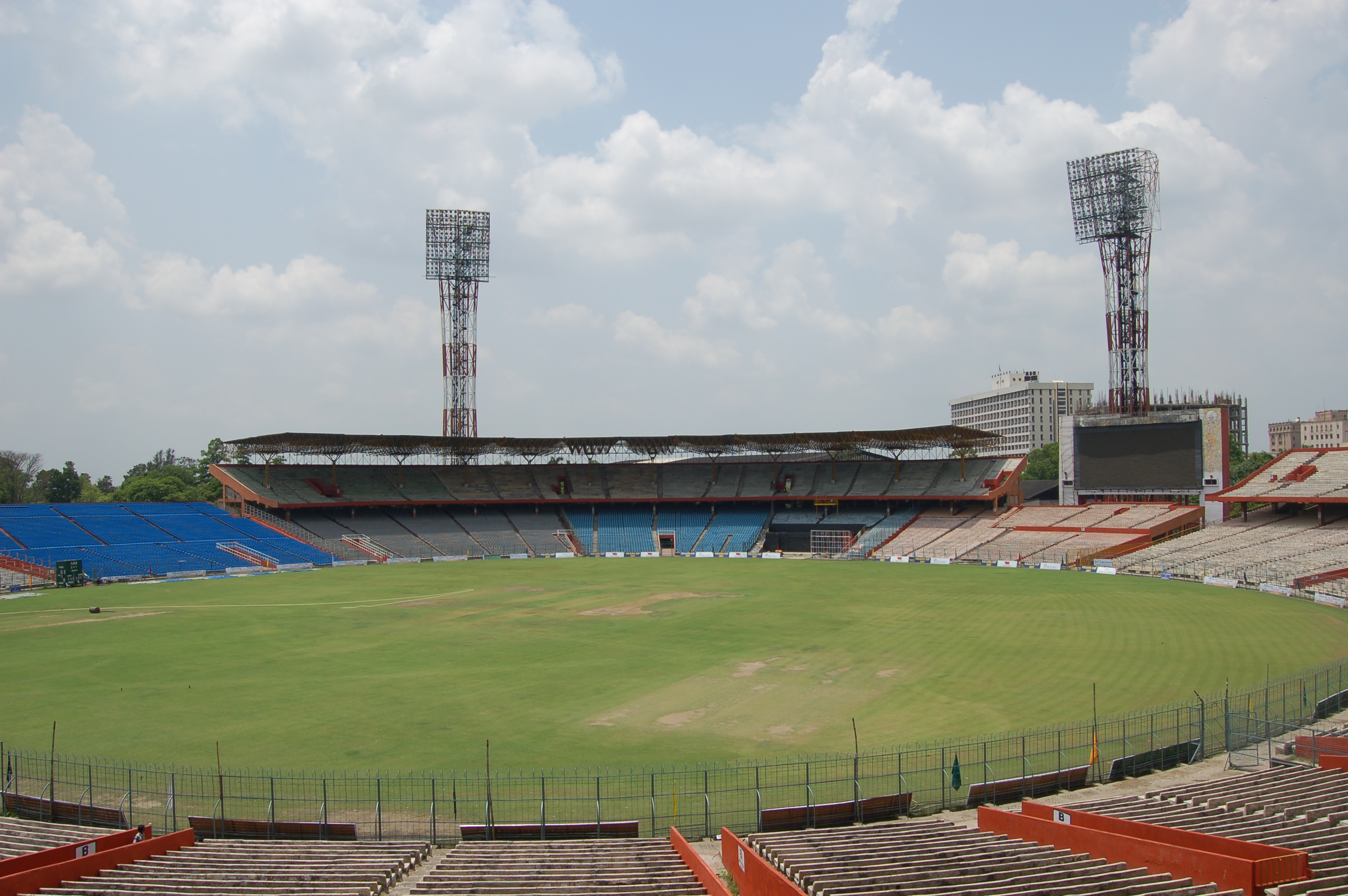
- Eden Gardens, venue for the Knockout stage of the tournament
- Dates: 7 – 27 November 1993
- Administrator: Cricket Association of Bengal
- Cricket format: One Day International
- Tournament format(s): Round-robin, Knockout
- Host: India
- Champions: India (1st title)
- Runners-up: West Indies
- Participants: 5
- Matches: 13
- Player of the series: (India) Mohammad Azharuddin
- Most runs: (India) Mohammad Azharuddin (311)
- Most wickets: (Cricket West Indies) Winston Benjamin (14)

The CAB Jubilee Tournament, also known as Hero Cup for sponsorship reasons, was a cricket tournament played in India in 1993 to commemorate the Cricket Association of Bengal's diamond jubilee. India, Sri Lanka, West Indies, South Africa and Zimbabwe took part in the multi-nation tournament. Envisaged as a six-nation tournament Pakistan pulled out on 3 November 1993, four days before the commencement of the first game. India beat West Indies in the final of the tournament to win the Hero Cup. Hero Cup was the first cricket event to be sponsored by Hero MotoCorp.

== Squads ==
India	South Africa	Sri Lanka	West Indies	Zimbabwe
Mohammad Azharuddin (c); Sachin Tendulkar (vc); Navjot Singh Sidhu; Vinod Kambli; Woorkeri Raman; Pravin Amre; Ajay Sharma; Manoj Prabhakar; Kapil Dev; Salil Ankola; Anil Kumble; Javagal Srinath; Rajesh Chauhan; Vijay Yadav (wk); Venkatapathy Raju	Kepler Wessels (c); Hansie Cronje (vc); Andrew Hudson; Daryll Cullinan; Jonty Rhodes; Dave Callaghan; Brian McMillan; Dave Richardson; Dave Rundle; Craig Matthews; Errol Stewart; Allan Donald; Richard Snell; Fanie de Villiers; Pat Symcox	Arjuna Ranatunga (c); Aravinda de Silva; Roshan Mahanama; Chandika Hathurusingha; Asanka Gurusinha; Hashan Tillakaratne; Sanath Jayasuriya; Ruwan Kalpage; Pramodya Wickramasinghe; Pubudu Dassanayake; Champaka Ramanayake; Romesh Kaluwitharana; Dulip Liyanage; Muttiah Muralitharan; Dulip Samaraweera	Richie Richardson (c); Phil Simmons; Brian Lara; Carl Hooper; Keith Arthurton; Jimmy Adams; Roland Holder; Junior Murray; Curtly Ambrose; Kenny Benjamin; Winston Benjamin; Anderson Cummins; Desmond Haynes	Andy Flower (c); Andy Waller (vc); David Brain; Eddo Brandes; Alistair Campbell; Mark Dekker; Grant Flower; David Houghton; Stephen Peall; John Rennie; Ali Shah; Heath Streak; Guy Whittall

South Africa announced a squad that would play the Hero Cup and the Australia tour retaining Kepler Wessels as their captain. Bowler Brett Schultz was rested owing to an injury. Ahead of the tournament, the India squad participated in a preparatory camp starting 1 November at the National Stadium in Delhi. The 18-member Zimbabwe squad arrived in Dhaka the same day to play two limited over games against Bangladesh Cricket Control Board XI, the latter then an associate member of the International Cricket Council.

== Notable efforts ==
Notable cricketing contributions include Sachin Tendulkar's match winning last over for India against South Africa in the Semi-finals (also the first match under lights at the Eden Gardens), Anil Kumbles 6/12 for India against the West Indies in the final – a match winning effort and then the best bowling figures by an Indian in limited overs cricket, Sanath Jayasuriya opening the batting for the first time for Sri Lanka and Jonty Rhodes's world record five catches for South Africa against the West Indies.

== Winning team ==
India won the tournament beating the West Indies.

Winning Team of 1993 Hero Cup – Cricket

== Controversies ==
Two of the matches involved crowd trouble, first in Ahmedabad, where crowd trouble interrupted play and in Calcutta, where a firecracker exploded in West Indian Keith Arthurtons face.

Hero Cup was the first tournament to be broadcast live on a satellite channel, Star TV. Until the Hero Cup in 1993, state terrestrial broadcaster Doordarshan had a monopoly on broadcast of cricket matches in India. Doordarshan claimed violation of the Indian Telegraph Act, 1885 act, claiming the broadcast right was public property and had to be uplinked from India (Star TV uplinks from Hong Kong). The matter went up to the Supreme Court in 1995, which held that broadcast rights could not be treated as public property.

== Fixtures ==
=== Venues ===
Ten different venues were used for each of the ten league games, with the semi-finals and finals being held at Calcutta.

Cricket grounds which hosted the Hero Cup

=== Points table ===
Points table at the end of the league stage:

Team	P	W	L	T	NR	Points	NRR
West Indies	4	3	1	0	0	6	+1.055
South Africa	4	2	1	0	1	5	+0.543
India	4	2	1	1	0	5	+0.082
Sri Lanka	4	1	3	0	0	2	−0.478
Zimbabwe	4	0	2	1	1	2	−1.260

=== League matches ===
7 November 1993
Scorecard

Sri Lanka; 203 (49.4 overs)	v	India; 205/3 (44.4 overs)
Roshan Mahanama 73 (124); Javagal Srinath 5/24 (6.4 overs)		Vinod Kambli 78 (100); Pramodya Wickramasinghe 2/13 (6 overs)

India won by 7 wickets
Green Park Stadium, Kanpur
Umpires: Steve Bucknor (WI) and Ian Robinson (Zim)
Player of the match: Javagal Srinath (Ind)

- India won the toss and elected to field.

9 November 1993
Scorecard

West Indies; 268/8 (50 overs)	v	Sri Lanka; 222/8 (50 overs)
Brian Lara 67 (109); Ruwan Kalpage 3/64 (10 overs)		Hashan Tillakaratne 104 (116); Winston Benjamin 5/22 (10 overs)

West Indies won by 46 runs
Wankhede Stadium, Bombay
Umpires: Shyam Bansal (Ind) and R. T. Ramachandran (Ind)
Player of the match: Hashan Tillakaratne (SL)

- Sri Lanka won the toss and elected to field.

10 November 1993
Scorecard

South Africa; 22/1 (9 overs)	v	Zimbabwe
Kepler Wessels 10* (33); David Brain 1/12 (5 overs)

No result
Chinnaswamy Stadium, Bangalore
Umpires: Piloo Reporter (Ind) and S. K. Sharma (Ind)

- Zimbabwe won the toss and elected to field.
- Rain reduced the match to 37 overs a side and the match was thereafter called off when it rained during the first innings.

14 November 1993
Scorecard

South Africa; 180/5 (40 overs)	v	West Indies; 139 (37 overs)
Daryll Cullinan 70 (81); Winston Benjamin 2/40 (8 overs)		Phil Simmons 29 (39); Pat Symcox 3/20 (8 overs)

South Africa won by 41 runs
Brabourne Stadium, Bombay
Umpires: V. K. Ramaswamy (Ind) and Raman Sharma (Ind)
Player of the match: Jonty Rhodes (SA)

- West Indies won the toss and elected to field.
- Overnight rain reduced the match to 40 overs a side.

15 November 1993
Scorecard

Sri Lanka; 263/6 (50 overs)	v	Zimbabwe; 208 (49 overs)
Aravinda de Silva 68 (94); David Brain 2/45 (10 overs)		Andy Waller 55 (46); Sanath Jayasuriya 4/19 (4 overs)

(SL) won by 55 runs
Moin-ul-Haq Stadium, Patna
Umpires: S. Choudhary (Ind) and K. Parthasarathy (Ind)
Player of the match: Arjuna Ranatunga (SL)

- Zimbabwe won the toss and elected to field.

16 November 1993
Scorecard

West Indies; 202/7 (50 overs)	v	India; 100 (28.3 overs)
Richie Richardson 41 (69); Anil Kumble 3/24 (10 overs)		Mohammad Azharuddin 23 (44); Carl Hooper 3/9 (4.3 overs)

West Indies won by 69 runs (revised target)
Sardar Patel Stadium, Ahmedabad
Umpires: Karl Liebenberg (SA) and Ian Robinson (Zim)
Player of the match: Winston Benjamin (WI)

- West Indies won the toss and elected to bat.
- Crowd trouble after India lost 6 wickets, match reduced by 12 overs.

18 November 1993
Scorecard

India; 248/5 (50 overs)	v	Zimbabwe; 248 (50 overs)
Manoj Prabhakar 91 (126); Stephen Peall 3/54 (10 overs)		Andy Flower 56 (82); Javagal Srinath 3/44 (10 overs)

Match tied
Nehru Stadium, Indore
Umpires: Karl Liebenberg (SA) and Steve Bucknor (WI)
Player of the match: Manoj Prabhakar (Ind)

- Zimbabwe won the toss and elected to field.

19 November 1993
Scorecard

South Africa; 214/7 (50 overs)	v	Sri Lanka; 136 (40.1 overs)
Kepler Wessels 53 (91); Sanath Jayasuriya 3/30 (7 overs)		Sanath Jayasuriya 27 (57); Richard Snell 4/12 (7.1 overs)

South Africa won by 78 runs
Nehru Stadium, Guwahati
Umpires: S. Choudhary (Ind) and V. K. Ramaswamy (Ind)
Player of the match: Richard Snell (SA)

- Sri Lanka won the toss and elected to field.

21 November 1993
Scorecard

West Indies; 233/9 (50 overs)	v	Zimbabwe; 99 (36.3 overs)
Desmond Haynes 75 (90); John Rennie 2/42 (9 overs)		Andy Flower 22 (47); Phil Simmons 3/23 (10 overs)

West Indies won by 134 runs
Lal Bahadur Shastri Stadium, Hyderabad
Umpires: Shyam Bansal (Ind) and Raman Sharma (Ind)
Player of the match: Desmond Haynes (WI)

- West Indies won the toss and elected to bat.

22 November 1993
Scorecard

India; 221 (49.2 overs)	v	South Africa; 178/9 (50 overs)
Vinod Kambli 86 (116); Hansie Cronje 3/29 (10 overs)		Jonty Rhodes 56 (72); Salil Ankola 3/33 (10 overs)

India won by 43 runs
Punjab Cricket Association Stadium, Chandigarh
Umpires: Steve Bucknor (WI) and Ian Robinson (Zim)
Player of the match: Vinod Kambli (Ind)

- South Africa won the toss and elected to field.

=== Semi-finals ===
24 November 1993
Scorecard

India; 195 (50 overs)	v	South Africa; 193/9 (50 overs)
Mohammad Azharuddin 90 (118); Fanie de Villiers 3/19 (10 overs)		Andrew Hudson 62 (112); Anil Kumble 2/29 (10 overs)

India won by 2 runs
Eden Gardens, Calcutta
Umpires: Steve Bucknor (WI) and Ian Robinson (Zim)
Player of the match: Mohammad Azharuddin (Ind)

- India won the toss and elected to bat.

25 November 1993
Scorecard

Sri Lanka; 188/6 (50 overs)	v	West Indies; 190/3 (41.5 overs)
Aravinda de Silva 68 (79); Carl Hooper 2/18 (10 overs)		Brian Lara 82 (121); Pramodya Wickramasinghe 2/27 (6 overs)

West Indies won by 7 wickets
Eden Gardens, Calcutta
Umpires: Shyam Bansal (Ind) and S. Choudhary (Ind)
Player of the match: Brian Lara (WI)

- West Indies won the toss and elected to field.

=== Final ===
27 November 1993
Scorecard

India; 225/7 (50 overs)	v	West Indies; 123 (40.1 overs)
Vinod Kambli 68 (90); Anderson Cummins 3/38 (10 overs)		Brian Lara 33 (47); Anil Kumble 6/12 (6.1 overs)

India won by 102 runs
Eden Gardens, Calcutta
Umpires: Karl Liebenberg (SA) and Ian Robinson (Zim)
Player of the match: Anil Kumble (Ind)

- West Indies won the toss and elected to field.
