= Hero Cup =

Hero Cup may refer to:

- Hero Cup (golf), a professional golf team event first played in 2023
- 1993 Hero Cup, a cricket tournament held in India
