= John Maynard (cricketer) =

West Indian cricketer

Personal information
- Full name: John Carl Maynard
- Born: 8 May 1969 (age 57); Gingerland, Nevis
- Nickname: The Dentist
- Batting: Right-handed
- Bowling: Right-arm fast
- Role: Bowler

Domestic team information
- Years: Team
- 1991–1999: Leeward Islands
- 1994: Norfolk
- 2006: St Kitts & Nevis Patriots
- FC debut: 22 February 1992 Leeward Islands v Trinidad and Tobago
- Last FC: 12 February 1999 Leeward Islands v Trinidad and Tobago
- LA debut: 20 February 1992 Leeward Islands v Trinidad and Tobago
- Last LA: 21 February 1995 Leeward Islands v Windward Islands

Career statistics
| Competition | FC | LA | T20 |
|---|---|---|---|
| Matches | 33 | 28 | 13 |
| Runs scored | 99 | 51 | 22 |
| Batting average | 6.58 | 7.50 | 3.00 |
| 100s/50s | 0/0 | 0/0 | 0/0 |
| Top score | 19* | 19 | 12 |
| Balls bowled | 1,986 | 854 | 372 |
| Wickets | 75 | 42 | 21 |
| Bowling average | 25.11 | 20.66 | 15.00 |
| 5 wickets in innings | 1 | 0 | 0 |
| 10 wickets in match | 0 | 0 | 0 |
| Best bowling | 5/24 | 4/31 | 4/9 |
| Catches/stumpings | 4/– | 0/– | 0/– |
- Source: CricketArchive, 29 January 2009

John Carl Maynard (born 8 May 1969) is a former West Indian cricketer. In a first-class career of 33 matches, he took 75 wickets. Maynard was selected in the West Indies A squad in 1996 for a home series against Pakistan A however, due to injury he was forced to miss the series.

After his professional career ended, Maynard played and coached club cricket in England.

== Aggressive style ==
A fast bowler, Maynard made an immediate impression on his List A debut (in the Geddes Grant Shield) for the Leeward Islands against Trinidad and Tobago in February 1992. He took a Man of the Match award for his three wickets, including former Test player Tony Gray, in a rain-reduced match.

Maynard came to international prominence while playing against the 1993–94 England touring side when he participated in two warm-up match before the Test series. In the first, representing St Kitts and Nevis, he took three of the England top order wickets in the first innings, dismissing Michael Atherton, Matthew Maynard and Nasser Hussain. He finished with 3/91 as Mark Ramprakash took command, scoring 136. He then played for the Leeward Islands in the second, picking up the wickets of Graham Thorpe, Graeme Hick and Ramprakash. The seven top-order batsman had scored just 44 runs between them.

Atherton went on to explain Maynard's nickname: "No, he was not a dentist in his spare time, but he did like knocking out batsmen's teeth." Maynard attributed the origins of the name to an incident when playing for Nevis against Antigua:

There was this bloke playing for Antigua called Zorah Barthley, who was the West Indies youth team captain... First thing in the morning he nicks one but the umps didn't send him on his way, and that wound me up a bit. And so the next ball was four yards quicker than anything I've ever bowled. He shaped to hook, and his teeth went flying all over the place, and it was a funny old sight. But he was the man who made the Dentist really. I couldn't have done it without him.

Maynard himself went on the record about his attitude:

"If you can't get them out, you gotta hurt them till they get out," he once said. "I think I've pretty much broken every part of the body so far, from the teeth to the jaw, to the nose, to the ribs, to the arms and the toes. I never worry about hurting them at the time."

In 2006, Maynard returned to cricket and made a real impression in the inaugural Stanford 20/20 tournament in the West Indies. Playing for St Kitts & Nevis Patriots, he took four wickets for just nine runs in his allotted four overs against rivals St Lucia. He was awarded the Man of the Match award, receiving $25,000.

After his professional career ended, Maynard played club cricket in England for several years and also coached, most recently at Newmarket Cricket Club.

== Reputation and legacy ==
For a cricketer who played 33 first-class matches and never played in an international, Maynard achieved quite a reputation. An editor wrote in 2007: "One might even go so far as to suggest he is the most famous West Indian fast bowler never to have played a Test, although very close on many occasions to be selected due to his raw pace and aggression. Those who were not hooked on the coverage of England's tour of the Caribbean in 1993–94 will probably have no idea who he is. Others, like myself, could give chapter and verse on his marmalisation of England's middle-order during their build-up to that winter's Test series."

Maynard himself was to say that he was always very close to receiving a Test call-up, but was pipped by Ottis Gibson, Vasbert Drakes and Nixon McLean.

In 2007, Maynard was a guest summariser on Test Match Special.
