= Tony Gray (cricketer) =

West Indian cricketer (born 1963)

Personal information
- Full name: Anthony Hollis Gray
- Born: 23 May 1963 (age 63); Port of Spain, Trinidad and Tobago
- Height: 6 ft 6 in (1.98 m)
- Batting: Right-handed
- Bowling: Right-arm fast

International information
- National side: West Indies
- Test debut (cap 188): 24 October 1986 v Pakistan
- Last Test: 12 March 1987 v New Zealand
- ODI debut (cap 46): 15 November 1985 v Pakistan
- Last ODI: 20 March 1991 v Australia

Domestic team information
- Years: Team
- 1983–1996: Trinidad and Tobago
- 1985–1990: Surrey
- 1993–1994: Western Transvaal

Career statistics
Competition	Tests	ODIs	FC	LA
Matches	5	25	122	91
Runs scored	48	51	1,702	411
Batting average	8.00	8.50	14.18	14.67
100s/50s	0/0	0/0	0/5	0/0
Top score	12*	10*	69	24*
Balls bowled	888	1,270	20,548	4,467
Wickets	22	44	451	128
Bowling average	17.13	18.97	22.80	23.06
5 wickets in innings	0	1	19	1
10 wickets in match	0	0	4	0
Best bowling	4/39	6/50	8/40	6/50
Catches/stumpings	6/–	3/–	57/–	15/–
- Source: Cricket Archive, 19 October 2010

Anthony Hollis Gray (born 23 May 1963) is a former West Indian cricketer who played five Tests and 25 One Day Internationals.

Gray was a tall fast bowler who hails from Trinidad. Despite his impressive average of 17.13 in Tests and a superb performance in the Indian subcontinent, Gray had limited opportunities due to persistent injuries and the presence of Malcolm Marshall, Joel Garner, Courtney Walsh and later Curtly Ambrose in the team.

== Career ==
Gray represented Trinidad & Tobago between 1984 and 1995. He played for Surrey in the English County Championship between 1985 and 1990 and also played for Western Transvaal in South Africa for the 1993–94 season.

Gray played his 5 Tests in the 1986–87 season versus Pakistan and New Zealand. He played 25 One Day Internationals between 1985 and 1991 with a best of 6-50 v Australia on his home ground Port of Spain.

After the end of his career, Gray went on to coach the Trinidad and Tobago team at youth as well as senior levels and at the University of Trinidad and Tobago. Gray also works a commentator upon coverage and shows based upon cricket.

== Personal life ==
Gray is a fan of English football team Manchester United.
