= Cameron Cuffy =

West Indian cricketer (born 1970)

Personal information
- Full name: Cameron Eustace Cuffy
- Born: 8 February 1970 (age 56); South Rivers, Saint Vincent and the Grenadines
- Height: 6 ft 7 in (2.01 m)
- Batting: Right-handed
- Bowling: Right-arm fast

International information
- National side: West Indies (1994-2002)
- Test debut (cap 206): 18 November 1994 v India
- Last Test: 30 October 2002 v India
- ODI debut (cap 67): 17 October 1994 v India
- Last ODI: 3 December 2002 v Bangladesh

Domestic team information
- Years: Team
- 1990–2004: Windward Islands
- 1994: Surrey

Career statistics
Competition	Test	ODI	FC	LA
Matches	15	41	86	98
Runs scored	58	62	375	182
Batting average	4.14	4.42	5.06	7.91
100s/50s	0/0	0/0	0/0	0/0
Top score	15	17*	37	24*
Balls bowled	3,366	2,153	14,910	5,045
Wickets	43	41	252	105
Bowling average	33.83	35.02	26.00	30.20
5 wickets in innings	0	0	8	0
10 wickets in match	0	0	1	0
Best bowling	4/82	4/24	7/80	4/24
Catches/stumpings	5/–	5/–	30/–	21/–
- Source: Cricket Archive, 21 August 2017

Cameron Eustace Cuffy (born February 8, 1970) is a former West Indian cricketer, who, due to his height (6-foot 7 inches) was often likened to his predecessors in the West Indies side, Joel Garner and Curtly Ambrose.

== International career ==
He made his Test debut against India in 1994. He dismissed Sachin Tendulkar three times in his Test career.

He was in and out of both the Test and one-day teams in the 1990s and after 2000, his international career was over. As a batsman, he was a tailender, averaging 4.14 in Test cricket.

Cuffy has the distinction of winning a man of the match award in a One Day International without scoring a run, taking a wicket or holding a catch. Playing against Zimbabwe at Harare in the opening fixture of a Coca-Cola Cup tournament on 23 June 2001 he won the match award for his analysis of 10–2–20–0. As the hosts managed only 239 for 9 in reply to 266 for 5 by West Indies, Cuffy's economy was crucial. No other bowler in the match conceded fewer than 35 runs from his full 10-over entitlement.

Sporting positions
Preceded by Joe Scuderi	Nelson Cricket Club professional 2004	Succeeded by Nathan Hauritz
