= Peter Martin (cricketer) =

English cricketer (born 1968)

Personal information
- Full name: Peter James Martin
- Born: 15 November 1968 (age 57); Accrington, Lancashire, England, UK
- Nickname: Digger
- Height: 187 cm (6 ft 2 in)
- Batting: Right-handed
- Bowling: Right-arm fast-medium
- Role: Bowler

International information
- National side: England
- Test debut (cap 571): 8 June 1995 v West Indies
- Last Test: 21 August 1997 v Australia
- ODI debut (cap 131): 26 May 1995 v West Indies
- Last ODI: 25 October 1998 v South Africa

Domestic team information
- Years: Team
- 1989–2004: Lancashire

Career statistics
Competition	Test	ODI	FC	LA
Matches	8	20	213	251
Runs scored	115	38	3,594	502
Batting average	8.84	6.33	19.42	13.21
100s/50s	0/0	0/0	2/7	0/0
Top score	29	6	133	35*
Balls bowled	1,452	1,048	36,700	11,539
Wickets	17	27	606	353
Bowling average	34.11	29.85	27.51	22.19
5 wickets in innings	0	0	17	6
10 wickets in match	0	0	1	0
Best bowling	4/60	4/44	8/32	5/16
Catches/stumpings	6/–	1/–	56/–	45/–
- Source: CricketArchive, 24 September 2009

Peter James Martin (born 15 November 1968) is a former English cricketer who played in 8 Tests and 20 ODIs for England from 1995 to 1998. Nicknamed "Digger", Martin was primarily a fast-medium swing bowler. In county cricket, he played for Lancashire throughout his career.

== Domestic career ==
As a batsman, Martin was capable of contributing runs from the lower order, and was competent enough to record two first-class centuries for Lancashire. By a statistical anomaly Martin topped the List A batting averages in 1996. He scored 78 runs in 12 innings, but was not out in 11 of these, so giving him a season's average of 78.00 despite a top score of just 35*. He continued to play for Lancashire until his retirement from cricket in 2004.

== International career ==
In 1995, he was called up to the England squad for their ODI series against West Indies, and he claimed figures of 4/44 on his debut. His success in that series earned him a place on the Test team to play the West Indies that year. He was named in the touring party for the England tour to South Africa later that year, and was also part of the England squad for the 1996 Cricket World Cup.

After 1996, he did not play many more matches for England with his last appearance coming in the 1998 ICC Knock Out tournament.
