= Barrington Browne =

West Indian cricketer (born 1967)

Personal information
- Born: 16 September 1967 (age 59); New Amsterdam, Guyana
- Batting: Right-handed
- Bowling: Right-arm fast
- Role: Bowler

Career statistics
Competition	ODI	FC	LA
Matches	4	43	33
Runs scored	8	209	66
Batting average	8.00	6.33	11.00
100s/50s	0/0	0/0	0/0
Top score	8*	29	26*
Balls bowled	180	5,868	1,330
Wickets	2	117	29
Bowling average	78.00	29.15	33.00
5 wickets in innings	0	5	0
10 wickets in match	0	0	0
Best bowling	2/50	6/51	2/9
Catches/stumpings	0/–	10/–	3/–
- Source: Cricinfo, 29 April 2023

Barrington St Aubyn Browne (born 16 September 1967) is a former West Indian cricketer who played four One Day Internationals, all against India in 1994. He represented Guyana in West Indies domestic cricket. He was born at New Amsterdam, Guyana in 1967.
