= Raman Sharma =

Indian cricket umpire (1945–1999)

Ramesh Chander Sharma
Personal information
- Full name: Ramesh Chander Sharma
- Born: 5 September 1945
- Died: 6 January 1999 (aged 53); Mahilpur, India

Umpiring information
- Tests umpired: 1 (1994)
- ODIs umpired: 11 (1993–1997)
- WTests umpired: 1 (1984)
- FC umpired: 32 (1982–1997)
- LA umpired: 24 (1989–1997)
- Source: CricketArchive, 4 August 2013

Ramesh Chander Sharma (5 September 1945 – 6 January 1999) was an Indian cricket umpire. He stood in one Test match in 1994 and eleven ODI games from 1993 to 1997. Sharma died when the jeep he was driving collided with a bus in 1999.

== See also ==
- List of Test cricket umpires
- List of One Day International cricket umpires
