= Anderson Cummins =

Canadian cricketer

Personal information
- Full name: Anderson Cleophas Cummins
- Born: 7 May 1966 (age 60); Christ Church, Barbados
- Batting: Right-handed
- Bowling: Right arm fast medium
- Role: All-rounder

International information
- National sides: West Indies (1991–1995); Canada (2007)
- Test debut (cap 203): 30 January 1993; West Indies v Australia
- Last Test: 10 December 1994; West Indies v India
- ODI debut (cap 60/45): 20 December 1991; West Indies v Pakistan
- Last ODI: 22 March 2007; Canada v New Zealand

Domestic team information
- Years: Team
- 1989–1996: Barbados
- 1993–1994: Durham
- 1993–1995: Surrey

Career statistics
Competition	Test	ODI	FC	LA
Matches	5	76	66	136
Runs scored	98	486	1,672	1,152
Batting average	19.60	13.50	20.14	16.69
100s/50s	0/1	0/0	1/8	0/2
Top score	50	44*	107	67
Balls bowled	618	3767	11,026	6,976
Wickets	8	91	192	181
Bowling average	42.75	31.61	31.58	28.39
5 wickets in innings	0	1	8	3
10 wickets in match	0	0	1	0
Best bowling	4/54	5/31	6/64	5/16
Catches/stumpings	1/–	14/–	15/–	29/–
- Source: ESPNcricinfo, 24 August 2012

Anderson Cleophas Cummins (born 7 May 1966) is a Barbadian former international cricketer who represented both the West Indies and Canada. He was primarily a fast-medium bowler. He played 5 Tests and 63 ODIs for the West Indies between 1991 and 1995, and 13 ODIs for Canada in 2007.

== West Indies career ==
Having made his name playing for Barbados, it was expected Cummins would make his Test match debut for the West Indies in their first-ever match against South Africa at the Kensington Oval in Barbados in 1992. However, the selectors eventually opted for Kenny Benjamin instead. As Cummins was the local favourite, many fans chose to boycott the match in protest.

Cummins eventually made his Test debut for the West Indies against Australia in 1993, but only appeared in four more Tests after that. His One Day International career was more successful and he appeared in 63 ODIs for the West Indies from 1991 to 1995 including 6 appearances in the 1992 Cricket World Cup. Cummins also picked up a sum of 12 wickets, being the most for the Windies at the said tournament.

== English county cricket ==
In English county cricket he had a two-year spell as an overseas player for Durham in 1993 and 1994.

== Canada cricket ==
Cummins stopped playing high-level cricket in 1996, and later moved to Canada where he played for Cavaliers in the Toronto and District Cricket Association league. After a long absence from international cricket, Cummins, at the age of 40, was a surprise selection for the Canadian squad for an ODI tri-series against Kenya and Scotland in January 2007. He made his Canadian debut against Scotland on 18 January, claiming Fraser Watts as his first ODI victim for his new team. He was later included in the Canadian squad for the 2007 Cricket World Cup, and played the match against Kenya to become the second man in history (after Kepler Wessels of Australia and South Africa) to play World Cup cricket for two different teams. Cummins eventually picked up 91 wickets at an average of 31.81 in his ODI career.

He announced his retirement after the tournament. However, Cummins remained involved with Cricket Canada as a coach for their Under-19 team in preparation for the 2012 U-19 World Cup.

== Other work ==
Cummins successfully pursued a Bachelors of Science Degree at the University of the West Indies' Cave Hill Campus. Whilst in Canada he later served as the lead webmaster at Canoe Inc., worked in a variety of managerial roles at Air Miles Canada and in 2009 started up his own company entitled Anderson Cummins Consultancy Inc.

== Personal life ==
He is married to Shivanthi Cummins, who is related to former Sri Lanka medium pacer Rumesh Ratnayake. The pair has three sons being Isaiah, Denzel and Anderson Jnr.

== See also ==
- List of cricketers who have played for more than one international team
