= Rajindra Dhanraj =

Trinidadian cricketer (born 1969)

Personal information
- Full name: Rajindra Dhanraj
- Born: 6 February 1969 (age 57); Barrackpore, Trinidad and Tobago
- Batting: Right-handed
- Bowling: Leg-break

International information
- National side: West Indies
- Test debut: 18 November 1994 v India
- Last Test: 27 April 1996 v New Zealand
- ODI debut: 26 October 1994 v New Zealand
- Last ODI: 28 January 1995 v New Zealand

Domestic team information
- Years: Team
- 1987–2001: Trinidad and Tobago

Career statistics
Competition	Tests	ODIs	FC	LA
Matches	4	6	78	44
Runs scored	17	8	550	98
Batting average	4.25	8.00	8.46	7.53
100s/50s	0/0	0/0	0/0	0/0
Top score	9	8	47	17*
Balls bowled	1,087	264	16,183	1,874
Wickets	8	10	295	79
Bowling average	74.37	17.00	27.10	15.83
5 wickets in innings	0	0	16	2
10 wickets in match	0	0	3	0
Best bowling	2/49	4/26	9/97	5/26
Catches/stumpings	1/–	1/–	29/–	9/–
- Source: Cricket Archive, 21 October 2010

Rajindra Dhanraj (born 6 February 1969) is a Trinidadian former cricketer who played for the West Indies cricket team. He played four tests and six One Day Internationals. He was also successful playing for the Trinidad & Tobago team.

== Career ==
Dhanraj was a prolific wicket taker at regional level throughout the 1990s, finishing with 295 first class wickets at an average of 27.10. His four Test appearances, spread out over four different series, yielded eight wickets at 74 apiece.

Dhanraj holds the world record for lowest bowling average in List A cricket among players with over 50 scalps, with his 79 victims costing just 15.83 apiece. Despite a good showing during his brief ODI career, he was limited to just six appearances in the format. He also boasts the lowest ODI bowling average (17.00) among West Indian players with at least 10 wickets.
