= Roger Harper =

West Indian cricketer

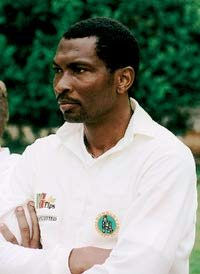

Personal information
- Full name: Roger Andrew Harper
- Born: 17 March 1963 (age 63); Georgetown, Guyana
- Height: 6 ft 4 in (1.93 m)
- Batting: Right-handed
- Bowling: Right-arm off break
- Relatives: Mark Harper (brother)

International information
- National side: West Indies
- Test debut: 10 December 1983 v India
- Last Test: 8 December 1993 v Sri Lanka
- ODI debut: 13 October 1983 v India
- Last ODI: 13 April 1996 v Sri Lanka

Domestic team information
- Years: Team
- 1979–1990: Demerara
- 1979–1997: Guyana
- 1985–1987: Northamptonshire

Career statistics
Competition	Test	ODI	FC	LA
Matches	25	105	200	214
Runs scored	535	855	7,480	2,650
Batting average	18.44	16.13	34.00	21.90
100s/50s	0/3	0/0	10/36	0/6
Top score	74	45*	234	69*
Balls bowled	3,615	5,175	37,826	10,403
Wickets	46	100	567	210
Bowling average	28.06	34.31	25.97	30.79
5 wickets in innings	1	0	28	1
10 wickets in match	0	0	3	0
Best bowling	6/57	4/40	6/24	5/37
Catches/stumpings	36/–	55/–	262/–	120/–
- Source: CricketArchive, 18 October 2010

Roger Andrew Harper (born 17 March 1963) is a Guyanese former cricketer turned coach, who played both Test and One Day International cricket for the West Indies cricket team. His international career lasted 13 years, from 1983 to 1996, and he was later described as a "fabulous" fielder.

His Test bowling average of 28.06 is superior to that of Lance Gibbs, giving him the leading average among all West Indian spinners with at least 25 Test wickets. One of his most notable performances was against South Africa in the quarter-finals of the 1996 Cricket World Cup when he took 4/47 to allow the West Indies to seize control of the match.

Harper was an all-rounder who batted right-handed and bowled right-arm off breaks, although suffering from the yips during part of his career. As a player, he scored 535 runs and took 46 wickets in his 25 Tests, and he played 200 first class matches. As a player, he made many of his best performances in England. His Test batting and bowling averages in England were better than his averages elsewhere, he recorded both his best Test bowling figures of 6/57 and his highest Test score (74) against England at Old Trafford, in 1984 and 1988, respectively, and he made his highest first-class score of 234 while playing for Northamptonshire (while batting at no.7) against Gloucestershire in 1986. It was in England (at Lord's) that he also pulled off his most famous piece of fielding to run out Graham Gooch during the MCC Bicentenary match in 1987.

After his playing career, he became a coach, taking over the West Indies team between 2000 and 2003, and then worked as team manager of the West Indies Under-19 cricket team in 2005. However, he was approached by Cricket Kenya in late December 2005 with an offer to take over the Kenyan national team after interim coach Mudassar Nazar, and the appointment was made official in January 2006. Harper said it "was great to be back" coaching players "at a relatively high level."

Sporting positions
Preceded by Alan Dawson	Nelson Cricket Club professional 1998–1999	Succeeded by Keith Arthurton
