= Stuart Williams (cricketer) =

West Indian cricketer

Personal information
- Full name: Stuart Clayton Williams
- Born: 12 August 1969 (age 57); Charlestown, Nevis
- Batting: Right-handed
- Bowling: Right-arm medium
- Role: Batsman

International information
- National side: West Indies
- Test debut (cap 205): 16 April 1994 v England
- Last Test: 2 May 2002 v India
- ODI debut (cap 68): 17 October 1994 v Pakistan
- Last ODI: 30 May 1999 v Australia

Domestic team information
- Years: Team
- 1986–2008: Nevis
- 1989–2005: Leeward Islands

Career statistics
Competition	Test	ODI	FC	LA
Matches	31	57	151	131
Runs scored	1,183	1,586	9,517	3,639
Batting average	24.14	32.36	40.67	31.10
100s/50s	1/3	1/12	26/36	2/27
Top score	128	105*	252*	105*
Balls bowled	18	24	252	84
Wickets	0	1	2	3
Bowling average	–	30	66.00	30.66
5 wickets in innings	–	0	0	0
10 wickets in match	–	0	0	0
Best bowling	–	1/30	1/19	2/62
Catches/stumpings	27/–	18/–	125/–	53/–
- Source: CricketArchive, 30 April 2010

Stuart Clayton Williams (born August 12, 1969) is a former West Indian cricketer. One of the opening batsmen tried after the retirement of Gordon Greenidge and Desmond Haynes, Williams was a batsman who may have not demonstrated his true potential as an opening batsman, may have been better suited to lower down the order.

== Domestic career ==
While playing first class cricket in the West Indies domestic competition he fractured a finger which later became infected and had to be amputated. He returned to First-class cricket the following year (2005) and topped his team's batting average with 339 runs at 54.83. This was his final season and he subsequently retired.

In June 2018, he was named as one of the two team coaches of the Cricket West Indies B Team squad for the inaugural edition of the Global T20 Canada tournament.

== International career ==
Williams scored one test century and three half centuries in a career spanning eight years from 1994 to 2002. Prolific at First Class level, he was a joy to watch though his innings in test cricket were all too brief despite flashes of brilliant stroke play.

His lone century, a gutsy 128 on a deteriorating Port of Spain wicket, helped draw the second Test against India in 1997. It proved a fateful innings as the West Indies went on to win the series 1–0.

Later that season, Williams (83) and Sherwin Campbell (79) added 160 for the first wicket in a successful fourth innings chase of 189 against Sri Lanka at St Johns. It remains the second highest fourth innings opening stand for the West Indies, the fourth highest in a winning run chase and the 12th highest in Test history. The team won the series 1–0.

Williams and Campbell formed the Caribbean team's sixth most successful opening pair in Tests at the time, yielding 868 runs over 27 innings. They have since been bumped down to tenth.

Following a three-year absence from Test cricket, he forced his way back into the team by topping the 2002 Busta Cup averages with 722 runs at 72.20. It would prove a false dawn as he managed just 91 runs in three Tests against the visiting Indians, bringing the curtain down on his Test career at age 32. His final Test average of 24.14 fell well below his First Class mark of 40.67.

Williams found more success in ODIs, tallying 1586 runs at an average of 32. A purple patch of 677 runs in 11 games during the 1997/98 season carried him to a career best of 16th in the ICC Rankings though his form declined afterwards. His streak included innings of 76, 78*, 90, 5, 26, 75, 77, 22, 105*, 55 and 68.

He along with Shivnarine Chanderpaul set the record for the highest ever opening stand for West Indies in ODIs(200*) It has since been overtaken.
