= Kenny Benjamin =

Antiguan cricketer (born 1967)

Personal information
- Full name: Kenneth Charlie Griffith Benjamin
- Born: 8 April 1967 (age 59); St. John's, Antigua and Barbuda
- Batting: Right-handed
- Bowling: Right-arm fast

International information
- National side: West Indies (1992–1998)
- Test debut: 18 April 1992 v South Africa
- Last Test: 13 February 1998 v England
- ODI debut: 4 December 1992 v Pakistan
- Last ODI: 17 December 1996 v Pakistan

Domestic team information
- Years: Team
- 1988–1999: Leeward Islands
- 1993: Worcestershire
- 1999–2000: Gauteng
- 2000–2001: Easterns

Career statistics
Competition	Test	ODI	FC	LA
Matches	26	26	108	93
Runs scored	222	65	1,199	281
Batting average	7.92	10.83	11.64	9.68
100s/50s	0/0	0/0	0/1	0/0
Top score	43*	17	52*	22
Balls bowled	5,132	1,319	19,445	4,563
Wickets	92	33	403	124
Bowling average	30.27	27.96	23.71	23.96
5 wickets in innings	4	0	18	0
10 wickets in match	1	0	2	0
Best bowling	6/66	3/34	7/51	4/33
Catches/stumpings	2/–	4/–	24/–	9/–
- Source: CricketArchive, 21 October 2010

Kenneth Charlie Griffith Benjamin (born 8 April 1967) is a former cricketer from Antigua and Barbuda who played 26 Tests and 26 One Day Internationals for the West Indies.

== Playing career ==
A right arm fast bowler, Benjamin spent much of his international career bowling alongside Courtney Walsh and Curtly Ambrose. He made his Test debut in their side's first ever Test against South Africa, in 1991–92. He never really made a name for himself until a spell of 6–66 against England in 1993–94 which he followed up with seven wickets in his next Test, finishing the series with 22 wickets.

Benjamin then took 17 wickets in the Windies' three test match away series in 1994 against India. He was also West Indies' top bowler during the six-Test series in England in 1995. His 23 wickets at 22.00 saw him finish ahead of Ambrose, Walsh and Ian Bishop, while his 10-wicket haul in the fifth Test (5/107 & 5/69) at Trent Bridge bumped him to 10th in the ICC Rankings.

Benjamin picked up 37 first class wickets at 24.62 in his lone 1993 season at Worcestershire. He later claimed a ten wicket haul of 10 for 150 in Gauteng's win against Border in the final of the 1999/2000 Supersport Series. Benjamin took a sum of 38 wickets at an average of 15.63 in his six first class matches for Guateng. He eventually signed with fellow South African side, Easterns for the subsequent season.

== Coaching career ==
After his playing career came to a close Benjamin took up coaching. He went on to coach the United States at the 2004 ICC Champions Trophy. While playing for Netherfield cricket team(Kendal) in England's Northern Premier League system, Benjamin was also contracted to coach schoolchildren, one of whom, Will Greenwood, went on to play international rugby for England. Greenwood remembers Benjamin's unique approach to keeping his young pupils attentive:

"If you were foolish enough to horse about, he'd bowl at you, coming in off just one yard and fire down the fastest ball you ever faced. He would then walk down the wicket, and, in a lazy West Indian drawl, say, "Don't mess about in my net sessions"."

Michael Vaughan, in his autobiography, gives credit to a "scary" time spent facing Benjamin in the nets, as formative in his development in facing fast bowlers. Aged 14, Vaughan made the first team at Sheffield Collegiate, for whom Benjamin also played.
