= Keith Arthurton =

West Indian cricketer

Personal information
- Full name: Keith Lloyd Thomas Arthurton
- Born: 21 February 1965 (age 61); Jessup, Nevis
- Batting: Left-handed
- Bowling: Slow left-arm orthodox
- Role: Batsman

International information
- National side: West Indies
- Test debut (cap 193): 21 July 1988 v England
- Last Test: 10 August 1995 v England
- ODI debut (cap 55): 22 October 1988 v Pakistan
- Last ODI: 16 May 1999 v Pakistan

Domestic team information
- Years: Team
- 1982–2000: Nevis
- 1986–2000: Leeward Islands

Career statistics
Competition	Test	ODI	FC	LA
Matches	33	105	129	118
Runs scored	1382	1,904	7,926	3,937
Batting average	30.71	26.08	45.29	31.24
100s/50s	2/8	0/9	19/47	3/20
Top score	157*	84	200*	118
Balls bowled	473	1384	2,913	3,339
Wickets	1	42	31	96
Bowling average	183.00	27.59	38.48	25.63
5 wickets in innings	0	0	0	0
10 wickets in match	0	0	0	0
Best bowling	1/17	4/31	3/14	4/25
Catches/stumpings	22/–	27/–	68/–	44/–
- Source: CricketArchive, 4 May 2010

Keith Lloyd Thomas Arthurton (born 21 February 1965) is a former West Indian cricketer. Having become only the third Test player from Nevis, the middle order batsman/left-arm orthodox bowler played in 33 Tests between July 1988 and August 1995 and continued playing in one day matches until May 1999. However, he never recovered from the 1996 World Cup, in which he scored two runs in five innings. Despite a strike rate of just 67 in one-day matches, Arthurton was a good striker of the ball, favouring the leg side.

== International career ==
He was also a good bowler. He took three 4-wicket hauls in the shorter version of the game with a best of 4/31. Arthurton was also an excellent fielder. His best moments were reserved for the subcontinent, as he got scores of 84, 63 and 44 off 30 balls in consecutive matches against Pakistan. In a match against India where the next highest score for West Indies was 16, Arthurton got 59 off 83. His best against them was 76 not out followed by 59 then 58 not out. This preceded 41 and 72 against them. Sri Lanka felt his presence as he got scores of 72 not out and then consecutive scores of 37 not out off just 31 balls with two sixes and a four and then 50 not out off 60 and then a 17 ball 24 not out. He rarely succeeded against England, though he had few memorable knocks against New Zealand and South Africa.

In Tests he got two hundreds and eight fifties. He had a best of 157 not out against Australia, a knock with 16 fours and a six.

== Controversy ==
Arthurton was involved in an unusual incident during a game between the West Indies Board of Control XI and the Australian national cricket team at Kensington Oval in Bridgetown, Barbados. Australian player Dean Jones believed that Arthurton was using an oversized cricket bat. The bat was found to be 4.5 inches wide, instead of the legal 4.25 inches, but he was allowed to continue to use the bat.

Sporting positions
Preceded by Roger Harper	Nelson Cricket Club professional 2000	Succeeded by Wade Wingfield
