= Winston Benjamin =

West Indian cricketer

Personal information
- Full name: Winston Keithroy Matthew Benjamin
- Born: 31 December 1964 (age 61); All Saints, Antigua and Barbuda
- Nickname: Private
- Batting: Right-handed
- Bowling: Right-arm fast

International information
- National side: West Indies (1986–1995)
- Test debut: 25 November 1987 v India
- Last Test: 29 April 1995 v Australia
- ODI debut: 17 October 1986 v Pakistan
- Last ODI: 28 May 1995 v England

Domestic team information
- Years: Team
- 1985–1995: Leeward Islands
- 1986–1993: Leicestershire
- 1994–1996: Hampshire

Career statistics
Competition	Tests	ODIs	FC	LA
Matches	21	85	171	222
Runs scored	470	298	3,985	1,725
Batting average	18.80	7.45	22.51	14.13
100s/50s	0/2	0/0	2/21	1/4
Top score	85	31	117	104*
Balls bowled	3,694	4,442	26,876	10,716
Wickets	61	100	476	263
Bowling average	27.01	30.79	25.96	26.61
5 wickets in innings	0	1	23	5
10 wickets in match	0	0	2	0
Best bowling	4/46	5/22	7/54	5/17
Catches/stumpings	12/–	16/–	95/–	46/–
- Source: Cricket Archive, 20 October 2010

Winston Keithroy Matthew Benjamin (born 31 December 1964) is a former Antiguan cricketer who played 21 Tests and 85 One Day Internationals for the West Indies. He is the father of Olympic gold medalist hurdler Rai Benjamin.

== Domestic career ==
Benjamin originally burst on the scene in 1985 when he was given a Viv Richards scholarship to England in 1985. He played at Chester Boughton Hall Cricket Club in the highly rated Liverpool Competition and finished the season with 106 wickets at an average of 7.57, a best of 8-20 and five or more wickets on eleven occasions. Chester Boughton Hall finished the season as champions.

This drew the attention of Leicestershire in the County Championship where he played from 1986 to 1993 before moving to Hampshire from 1994 to 1996.

== International career ==
He made his Test debut against India at Delhi on the 1987–88 tour. After eight Tests he was left out of the team until 1993, when he played consistently for two years, but he was dropped again after Australia's 1994–95 tour and never returned to the side.

Benjamin took 39 wickets at an average of 19.30 in his first 11 Tests, though his final ten appearances yielded 22 scalps at 40.68.

He played more regularly in the shorter format of the game, and was a fixture in the side from his debut against Pakistan at Peshawar in 1986–87 until West Indies' 1995 tour of England.

== Coaching career ==
After his playing career at the highest level was over, he acted as coach for the Leeward Islands, but was sacked in June 2005. Now he is a coach for a leeward island (Antigua) at the Clare Hall Secondary School.
