= Courtney Walsh =

Jamaican cricketer (born 1962)

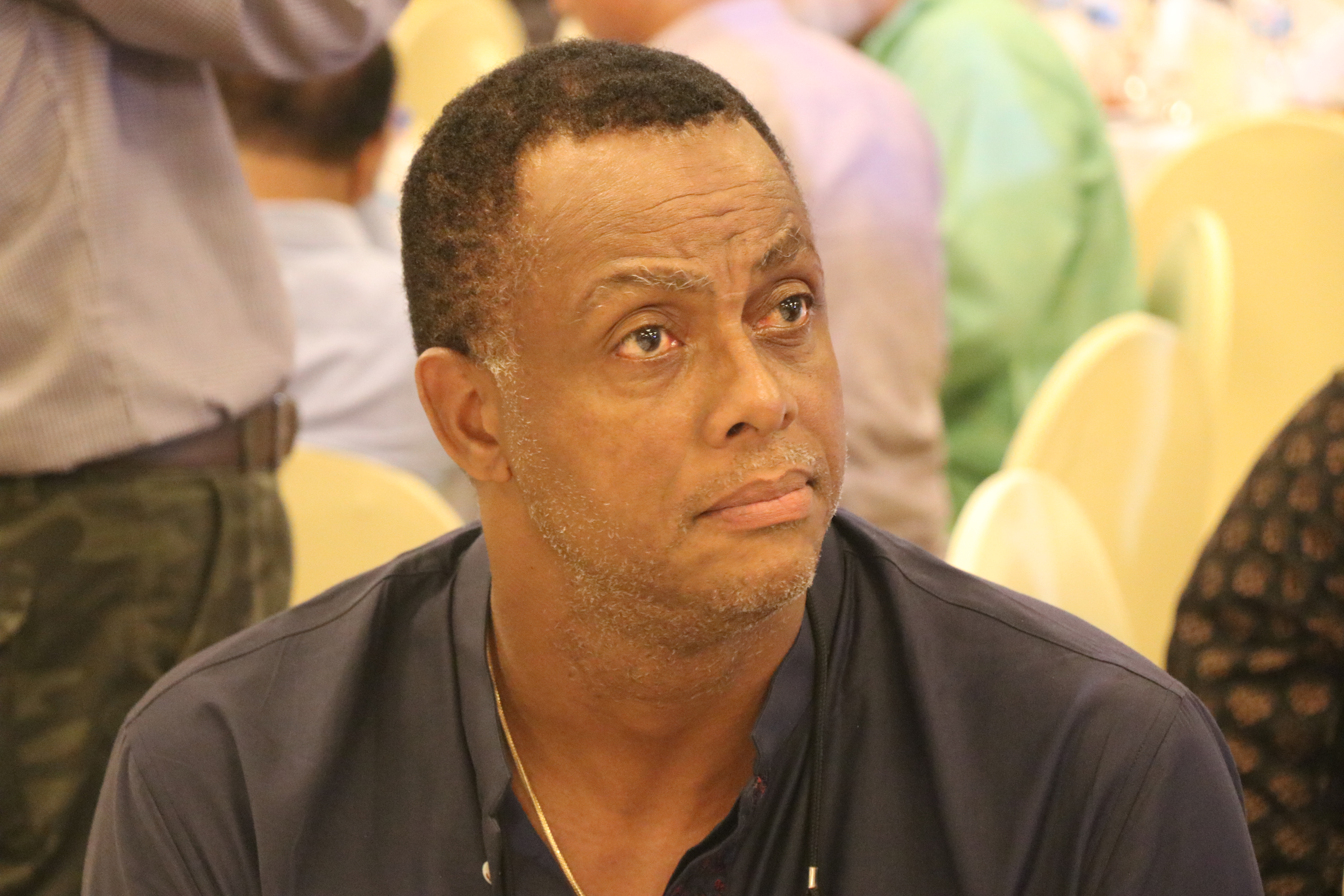
- Courtney Walsh in 2018

Personal information
- Full name: Courtney Andrew Walsh
- Born: 30 October 1962 (age 64); Kingston, Jamaica
- Height: 198 cm (6 ft 6 in)
- Batting: Right-handed
- Bowling: Right-arm fast
- Role: Bowler

International information
- National side: West Indies (1984–2001)
- Test debut (cap 183): 9 November 1984 v Australia
- Last Test: 19 April 2001 v South Africa
- ODI debut (cap 45): 10 January 1985 v Sri Lanka
- Last ODI: 11 January 2000 v New Zealand
- ODI shirt no.: 12, 33

Domestic team information
- Years: Team
- 1981/82–2000/01: Jamaica
- 1984–1998: Gloucestershire

Career statistics
Competition	Test	ODI	FC	LA
Matches	132	205	429	440
Runs scored	936	321	4,530	1,304
Batting average	7.54	6.97	11.32	8.75
100s/50s	0/0	0/0	0/8	0/0
Top score	30*	30	66	38
Balls bowled	30,019	10,822	85,443	21,881
Wickets	519	227	1,807	551
Bowling average	24.44	30.47	21.71	25.14
5 wickets in innings	22	1	104	5
10 wickets in match	3	0	20	0
Best bowling	7/37	5/1	9/72	6/21
Catches/stumpings	29/–	27/–	117/–	68/–
- Source: CricketArchive, 21 August 2008

Courtney Andrew Walsh OJ (born 30 October 1962) is a Jamaican former cricketer who represented the West Indies from 1984 to 2001, captaining the team in 22 Test matches. He played as a fast bowler and is considered one of the all-time greats, best known for his opening bowling partnership with fellow West Indian Curtly Ambrose for several years. Walsh played 132 Tests and 205 ODIs for the West Indies and took 519 and 227 wickets respectively. He shared 421 Test wickets with Ambrose in 49 matches. He held the record of most Test wickets from 2000, after he broke the record of Kapil Dev. This record was later broken in 2004 by Shane Warne. He was the first bowler to reach 500 wickets in Test cricket. His autobiography is entitled "Heart of the Lion". Walsh was named one of the Wisden Cricketers of the Year in 1987. In October 2010, he was inducted into the ICC Cricket Hall of Fame. He was appointed as the Specialist Bowling Coach of Bangladesh Cricket Team in August 2016.

== Early life and first-class career ==
Courtney Andrew Walsh was born on 30 October 1962 in Kingston, Jamaica. He played his early cricket there with the same cricket club for which Michael Holding also played cricket—the Melbourne club. Walsh's first claim to fame came in 1979 when he took 10 wickets in an innings in school cricket, and three years later he made his first-class cricket debut. He played 427 matches of this format between 1981 and 2001, and took 1,807 wickets at the average of 21.71, including 104 five-wicket hauls and 20 ten-wicket hauls. Walsh played first-class cricket for Gloucestershire County Cricket Club (Gloucestershire CCC) from 1985 to 1998.

Walsh played cricket for the West Indies from 1984 to 2001, Gloucestershire County Cricket Club (Gloucestershire CCC) from 1984 to 1998, Jamaica cricket team from 1981–82 to 1999–00, Rest of the World XI in 1987 and West Indies A in 1991–92. He first played for Gloucestershire CCC in 1984 and was a mainstay of the side until 1998.

== International career ==
Walsh made his Test debut against Australia in Perth in 1984, taking 2 wickets for 43 runs. He played six Test matches during the 1984–85 season, five against Australia in the 1984–85 series between the teams, and one Test against New Zealand in the home series. He took 16 wickets in the season conceding 507 runs. In the same season, Walsh also made his One Day International debut against Sri Lanka at Hobart during the World Series Cup. He took one wicket for 47 from 10 overs in the match. In the next two seasons, Walsh played a match at home against England, three matches against Pakistan and three matches against New Zealand, both outside the West Indies. He took 29 wickets from seven matches in these seasons, including a five-wicket haul against New Zealand. In 1987, Walsh was named as one of the Wisden Cricketers of the Year for his performance the previous year.

In the 1987–88 season, Walsh toured India and played four Test matches against them, taking 26 wickets at an average of 16.80. In the first Test of the series at Feroz Shah Kotla Ground, he took six wickets for 67 runs, including five wickets for 54 runs in India's second innings. In the first innings of the second Test at Wankhede Stadium, he repeated the same performance of five for 54. In that season, Pakistan cricket team visited the West Indies and played three Tests there. In the 1987 Cricket World Cup Walsh backed out to ball and run out Saleem Jaffar as he was backing up as Pakistan required two off the last ball to qualify for the semi-finals, Abdul Qadir eventually scored the winning runs and West Indies lost but Walsh was deservedly feted for his sportsmanship, he even received a hand-woven carpet from a local fan. Walsh underperformed in the series, taking only four wickets from three matches. He played four matches against England in 1988, and took 12 wickets at an average of 34.33. During the West Indies tour of Australia in 1988–89, Walsh played five Tests and took 17 wickets at 29.41. His best bowling in the series came the first innings of the first match, taking four wickets for 62 runs, including a hat-trick. He took an unusual hat-trick that covered two innings at the Brisbane Cricket Ground, dismissing Australia's Tony Dodemaide with the last ball of the first innings and Mike Veletta and Graeme Wood with his first two deliveries in the second. During that winter he also took 10 wickets in a Test match for the first time against India in Kingston.

In 1994, he was appointed captain of the West Indies for the tours of India and New Zealand after Richie Richardson was ordered to rest because of "acute fatigue syndrome". In 1995, he took 62 Test wickets at an average of 21.75 runs per wicket, a performance which he bettered in 2000 when he took 66 Test wickets at an average of 18.69, including 34 wickets in the Test series against England at an average of 12.82 runs per wicket. Coming close to the record for a West Indian bowler of 35 wickets in a Test series (set by Malcolm Marshall in 1988). In the 1990s, his partnership with Curtly Ambrose was one of the most feared bowling attacks in world cricket.

During the first part of his career, Walsh served as the "stock" bowler in an attack featuring Marshall, Joel Garner and later Ambrose, but after the retirement of Marshall and Garner took the role as opening bowler. His action lacked the elegance of those bowlers, but its economy and his natural athleticism ensured he was accurate and durable, even over very long spells and he used his height (about 198 cm, or six-foot-six) to extract vicious bounce. Even as he lost pace in the later stage of his career he continued to take wickets at an undiminished rate; teams tended to defend against him and Ambrose and attack the weaker third and fourth bowlers.

Walsh played his last ODI against New Zealand in 2000 and his last Test match against South Africa in his homeland, Jamaica, in 2001.

A graph showing Walsh's test career bowling statistics and how they have varied over time.

Walsh is one of only seven bowlers to have bowled over 5000 overs in Test cricket, the others being Muttiah Muralitharan of Sri Lanka, Shane Warne and Nathan Lyon of Australia, Anil Kumble of India and James Anderson and Stuart Broad of England. He is also one of only seven bowlers to have taken 500 or more Test wickets. In ODIs, Walsh was not as successful although he will be remembered for his best performance, 5 wickets for just 1 run against Sri Lanka in 1986. In first-class cricket, he took 5 wickets in an innings more than 100 times and 10 wickets in a match 20 times.

His highest score, coincidentally, was 30 in both forms of the game. By the end of his career, he had such a reputation for poor batting that the crowd would cheer every ball he faced. Whether this was in appreciation of his batting or an attempt to wind up the bowling side is open to interpretation. His most significant (if scoreless) innings came when he kept Brian Lara company during a last-wicket stand to ensure victory in the match (and thus a draw in the series) against Australia in the Third Test in 1999 (Walsh also took seven wickets in the match). A trademark of his batting was an elaborate windmilling leave-alone. Walsh is a much loved and respected cricketer and the West Indies have yet to find a fast bowler with anything approaching his talents.

Walsh is also famous for his sportsmanlike gesture of not mankading last man Saleem Jaffar of Pakistan in a World Cup match in 1987, which cost the West Indies the match and a place in the semi-finals.

He is currently a regular feature of the Lashings World XI alongside other cricket legends including Sachin Tendulkar and fellow West Indian Richie Richardson. In May 2004, Walsh was chosen one of the Jamaica's five greatest cricketers of all time.

He has a dubious distinction of being one of three players to play more than 100 test matches and not make a half-century, the others being Nathan Lyon and Makhaya Ntini.

== Records ==
Walsh took 5 wickets in an ODI match conceding only one run against Sri Lanka in December 1986, a match which the West Indies won at the Sharjah Cricket Association Stadium, Sharjah by 193 runs. This was his solitary five-wicket haul in the format. In February 1998, he played his 100th Test, against England in Georgetown, Guyana. In 2000, Walsh became the highest wicket-taker in Test cricket, breaking a six-year-old record of Kapil Dev's 434 wickets. He achieved the feat in his 114th match, which are 17 matches less than Kapil Dev. Walsh became the first bowler to reach 500 wickets in the history of Test cricket. He achieved the feat against South Africa in 2001, getting Jacques Kallis leg before wicket in Port-of-Spain, Trinidad. Throughout his Test career, Walsh produced one of the greatest opening partnership with Curtly Ambrose as a bowler, and shared 421 wickets from 49 matches with the latter. Walsh's 519 wickets in Test cricket was a record at that time, which was surpassed by Australian Shane Warne in 2004

Walsh's feats with the bat are rather less flattering, as indicated by an average of seven in both Test cricket and ODIs. He also holds the record for the most Test ducks (43), and also held the record for the most "not outs" – 61 times – until passed by James Anderson in 2017.

Walsh played 132 Tests and 205 ODI matches, and took 519 and 227 wickets respectively. He took 22 five wicket hauls in Tests—of which five fifers came in the first 63 appearances and 17 in the later 69 appearances—and one in ODIs.

Walsh holds the record for the best bowling figures (13 for 55) for a captain in a Test match.

== Retirement ==
During his Test career, spanned over seventeen years, Walsh bowled 5004.1 overs, captured 519 wickets at an average of 24.45 runs and at a strike rate of 57.55 in 132 Test matches. Cricket critics considered him that he was "one of the most admired cricketers of recent times and will long be remembered as one of the game's most revered players." He played last time in Test cricket against South Africa in April 2001, a match West Indies won by 130 runs at Sabina Park, Kingston, Jamaica. He took six wickets for 103 runs in the match. In ODIs, he took 227 wickets from 205 matches at an average of 30.47. His last ODI came in January 2000, against New Zealand at Jade Stadium, Christchurch in which he took one wicket for 70 runs.

Former West Indian captain Clive Lloyd attributed Walsh: "I don't think you'll find another Courtney Walsh around and if I was a young fast bowlers, I'd want to emulate him." Former West Indian all-rounder Garry Sobers said about him that the "young crop of fast bowlers can take from him his dedication to West Indies and his ability to be always there, trying and giving 100 per cent in difficult conditions."

== Post-retirement ==
After his career as a selector for the West Indies national cricket team, Walsh signed as bowling coach of Bangladesh in August, 2016. His contract expired after the 2019 Cricket World Cup and he left his position as Bangladesh bowling coach along with then Bangladesh head coach Steve Rhodes.

Courtney Walsh is the son of Joan Wollaston and also owns a restaurant in Jamaica called Cuddyz. In November 2019, he was appointed as the assistant coach to the head coach Gus Logie for the West Indies women's cricket team.

== Coaching career ==
Walsh was appointed bowling coach of the Bangladesh national cricket team in September 2016 on a three-year contract. He was appointed interim head coach in February 2018 following the resignation of Chandika Hathurusingha, with his first tournament in charge being the 2018 Nidahas Trophy.

In October 2020, he was appointed as head coach of West Indies women's national cricket team. After the 2023 T20 World Cup, Cricket West Indies decided not to renew his contract.

== Awards and honours ==
Walsh was named one of the Wisden Cricketers of the Year in 1987, and the cricket almanack Wisden noted his "three distinct speeds, all delivered with the same action", and his "sparing use of the bouncer, his shorter deliveries generally threatening the batsman's rib-cage, a tactic which, allied to change of pace, produced many catches in the short-leg area off splice or glove." Walsh was selected as one of the West Indian Cricket Cricketer of the Year in 1988. He was named one Jamaica's greatest cricketers of all time in 2004.

In October 2010, he was inducted into the ICC Cricket Hall of Fame along with Joel Garner, joining the other fifteen West Indian players.

== See also ==
- List of international cricket five-wicket hauls by Courtney Walsh

Sporting positions
Preceded by Richie Richardson	West Indies Test cricket captains 1993/4–1997/1998	Succeeded by Brian Lara
Records
Preceded by Kapil Dev	World Record – Most Career Wickets in Test cricket 519 wickets (24.44) in 132 Tests; Held record from 27 March 2000 to 8 May 2004	Succeeded by Muttiah Muralitharan
