= Junior Murray =

West Indian cricketer

Junior Murray MBE
Personal information
- Full name: Junior Randalph Murray
- Born: 20 January 1968 (age 58); St. George's, Grenada
- Batting: Right-handed
- Role: Wicketkeeper Batsman

International information
- National side: West Indies
- Test debut: 2 January 1993 v Australia
- Last Test: 19 April 2002 v India
- ODI debut: 4 December 1992 v Pakistan
- Last ODI: 7 February 1999 v South Africa

Domestic team information
- Years: Team
- 1986–2007: Windward Islands

Career statistics
| Competition | Tests | ODIs | FC | LA |
|---|---|---|---|---|
| Matches | 33 | 55 | 149 | 122 |
| Runs scored | 918 | 678 | 6,830 | 1,895 |
| Batting average | 22.39 | 22.60 | 30.90 | 23.10 |
| 100s/50s | 1/3 | 0/5 | 11/30 | 1/8 |
| Top score | 101* | 86 | 218 | 100* |
| Catches/stumpings | 99/3 | 46/7 | 337/31 | 93/31 |
- Source: Cricket Archive, 21 October 2010

Junior Randalph Murray MBE (born January 20, 1968) is a West Indian former cricketer. He was the first Grenadian to play Test cricket for the West Indies.

He was appointed Member of the Order of the British Empire (MBE) in the 1994 New Year Honours for services to sport.

== Domestic career ==
Murray started his domestic career as a football goal keeper and was very good at it. He was also just as good behind the stumps as well as a batsman. He represented his school Grenada Boy's Secondary School (GBSS) both in football and cricket. Influenced by his school master to focus on cricket rather than football for a better sporting career in the region, he played his domestic cricket for the Windward Islands, making his first class debut in the 1986/87 season and playing on into 2006/07. In 148 first class matches up to the end of 2006 he scored 6,813 runs at a handy 31.1 with a best of 218 against Guyana. In 122 list A one-day matches he scored 1,895 runs at 23.1 with one unbeaten hundred (100*) against Bermuda in the Red Stripe Bowl.

== International career ==
He played 33 Tests for the West Indies and scored his only Test century (101*), in the lower order against New Zealand. He finished his international career on the disastrous tour of South Africa of 1998–99, with more than 100 Test dismissals. Murray often opened for the west Indies in One Day Internationals with varying degrees of success.

== Accolades ==
A stand at the Grenada National Cricket Stadium was jointly renamed in both Murray and Rawl Lewis' honour.
