= 1996–97 Singer Akai Cup =

International cricket tournament

1997 Singer Akai Cup
- Cricket format: One Day International
- Host: United Arab Emirates
- Champions: Sri Lanka
- Runners-up: Pakistan
- Participants: 3
- Matches: 7
- Player of the series: (Sri Lanka) Aravinda de Silva
- Most runs: (Sri Lanka) Aravinda de Silva (410)
- Most wickets: (Sri Lanka) Muttiah Muralitharan (13)

The 1997 Singer Akai Cup was a cricket tournament held in Sharjah, UAE, between April 3-11, 1997. Three national teams took part: Pakistan, Sri Lanka, and Zimbabwe.

The 1997 Singer Akai Cup started with a double round-robin tournament where each team played the other twice. The two leading teams qualified for the final. Sri Lanka won the tournament and US$40,000. Runners-up Pakistan won US$25,000 and Zimbabwe US$10,000.

The beneficiaries of the tournament were Waqar Younis and Saeed Ahmed who each received US$35,000, and Aslam Khokhar, Israr Ali and Zulfiqar Ahmed (all Pakistan) who each received US$10,000.

== Squads ==
=== Pakistan ===
- Wasim Akram (captain)
- Rameez Raja
- Sajid Ali
- Ijaz Ahmed
- Shahid Afridi
- Inzamam-ul-Haq
- Saleem Malik
- Mohammad Wasim
- Mushtaq Ahmed
- Moin Khan (wicket-keeper)
- Saqlain Mushtaq
- Waqar Younis
- Mohammad Zahid
- Shahid Nazir

=== Sri Lanka ===
- Arjuna Ranatunga (captain)
- Sanath Jayasuriya
- Romesh Kaluwitharana (wicket-keeper)
- Marvan Atapattu
- Aravinda de Silva
- Hashan Tillakaratne
- Roshan Mahanama
- Ruwan Kalpage
- Kumar Dharmasena
- Chaminda Vaas
- Upul Chandana
- Muttiah Muralitharan
- Nuwan Zoysa
- Sajeewa de Silva

=== Zimbabwe ===
- Alistair Campbell (captain)
- Andy Flower (vice-captain/wicket-keeper/coach)
- Eddo Brandes
- Stuart Carlisle
- Grant Flower
- Everton Matambanadzo
- JA Rennie
- Bryan Strang
- Paul Strang
- Heath Streak
- Dirk Viljoen
- Andy Whittall
- Guy Whittall
- Craig Wishart

== Matches ==
=== Group stage ===
Team	P	W	L	T	NR	NRR	Points
Sri Lanka	4	3	1	0	0	+0.197	6
Pakistan	4	2	2	0	0	+0.275	4
Zimbabwe	4	1	3	0	0	-0.455	2

3 April 1997
Scorecard

Zimbabwe; 187/9 (50 overs)	v	Sri Lanka; 188/3 (45.4 overs)
A Flower 38 (61); PA Strang 38 (52); WPUJC Vaas 3/25 (10 overs)		PA de Silva 60 (81); GW Flower 1/15 (4.4 overs)

Sri Lanka won by 7 wickets
Sharjah Cricket Stadium, Sharjah, UAE
Umpires: DB Cowie (NZ) and RS Dunne (NZ)
Player of the match: PA de Silva (SL)

- Sri Lanka won the toss and elected to field.
- DP Viljoen (ZIM) made his ODI debut.

4 April 1997
Scorecard

Sri Lanka; 243/8 (50 overs)	v	Pakistan; 224/9 (50 overs)
PA de Silva 97 (137); Saqlain Mushtaq 3/47 (10 overs)		Shahid Afridi 67 (55); M Muralitharan 3/38 (10 overs)

Sri Lanka won by 19 runs
Sharjah Cricket Stadium, Sharjah, UAE
Umpires: RS Dunne (NZ) and CJ Mitchley (SA)
Player of the match: PA de Silva (SL)

- Pakistan won the toss and elected to field.

6 April 1997
Scorecard

Pakistan; 187 (50 overs)	v	Zimbabwe; 94 (31.4 overs)
Inzamam-ul-Haq 46 (68); HH Streak 3/37 (10 overs)		CB Wishart 29 (38); Mushtaq Ahmed 2/20 (7 overs)

Pakistan won by 93 runs
Sharjah Cricket Stadium, Sharjah, UAE
Umpires: DB Cowie (NZ) and CJ Mitchley (SA)
Player of the match: Inzamam-ul-Haq (PAK)

- Pakistan won the toss and elected to bat.

7 April 1997
Scorecard

Sri Lanka; 251/7 (50 overs)	v	Pakistan; 200 (45.4 overs)
PA de Silva 134 (131); Saqlain Mushtaq 2/42 (10 overs); Saleem Malik 2/42 (9 overs)		Inzamam-ul-Haq 62 (66); HDPK Dharmasena 3/27 (9.4 overs)

Sri Lanka won by 51 runs
Sharjah Cricket Stadium, Sharjah, UAE
Umpires: DB Cowie (NZ) and RS Dunne (NZ)
Player of the match: PA de Silva (SL)

- Sri Lanka won the toss and elected to bat.

8 April 1997
Scorecard

Zimbabwe; 203 (49.5 overs)	v	Sri Lanka; 153 (46.1 overs)
GJ Whittall 44 (59); RS Kalpage 3/38 (9 overs)		RS Mahanama 42 (70); HH Streak 2/12 (8.1 overs)

Zimbabwe won by 50 runs
Sharjah Cricket Stadium, Sharjah, UAE
Umpires: RS Dunne (NZ) and CJ Mitchley (SA)
Player of the match: GJ Whittall (ZIM)

- Zimbabwe won the toss and elected to bat.

9 April 1997
Scorecard

Pakistan; 151/9 (50 overs)	v	Zimbabwe; 119 (40.1 overs)
Moin Khan 61 (97); HH Streak 4/18 (10 overs)		A Flower 28 (54); Mushtaq Ahmed 4/27 (10 overs)

Pakistan won by 32 runs
Sharjah Cricket Stadium, Sharjah, UAE
Umpires: DB Cowie (NZ) and CJ Mitchley (SA)
Player of the match: Moin Khan (PAK)

- Pakistan won the toss and elected to bat.

=== Final ===
11 April 1997
Scorecard

Pakistan; 214 (49.2 overs)	v	Sri Lanka; 215/6 (49.2 overs)
Inzamam-ul-Haq 61 (75); M Muralitharan 3/42 (10 overs)		PA de Silva 87* (124); Saqlain Mushtaq 2/41 (10 overs)

Sri Lanka won by 4 wickets
Sharjah Cricket Stadium, Sharjah, UAE
Umpires: RS Dunne (NZ) and CJ Mitchley (SA)
Player of the match: PA de Silva (SL)

- Pakistan won the toss and elected to bat.

== See also ==
- Sharjah Cup
