= 1989–90 Champions Trophy =

International cricket tournament

1989 Champions Trophy
- Cricket format: One Day International
- Tournament format: Double round-robin
- Host: United Arab Emirates
- Champions: Pakistan
- Runners-up: India
- Participants: 3
- Matches: 6
- Player of the series: (Pakistan) Saleem Malik
- Most runs: (Pakistan) Saleem Malik (260)
- Most wickets: (Cricket West Indies) CA Walsh (9)

The 1989 Champions Trophy was a cricket tournament held in Sharjah, UAE, between October 13–20, 1989. Three national teams took part: India, Pakistan and West Indies.

The 1989 Champions Trophy was a double round-robin tournament where each team played the other twice. Pakistan won the tournament by winning all four of their matches.

The beneficiaries of the tournament were Fazal Mahmood (Pakistan), Iqbal Qasim (Pakistan), Krishnamachari Srikkanth (India), Polly Umrigar (India) and Viv Richards (West Indies) who each received US$35,000 (£20,000).

== Matches ==
=== Group stage ===
| Team | P | W | L | T | NR | RR | Points |
|---|---|---|---|---|---|---|---|
| Pakistan | 4 | 4 | 0 | 0 | 0 | 5.285 | 16 |
| India | 4 | 1 | 3 | 0 | 0 | 4.492 | 4 |
| West Indies | 4 | 1 | 3 | 0 | 0 | 3.872 | 4 |

13 October 1989
Scorecard
Wisden report

| India; 169 (48.1 overs) | v | West Indies; 173/5 (47.5 overs) |
| NS Sidhu 28 (51); CA Walsh 4/25 (10 overs) | | AL Logie 59* (65); Arshad Ayub 2/27 (10 overs) |

West Indies won by 5 wickets
Sharjah Cricket Stadium, Sharjah, UAE
Umpires: HD Bird (ENG) and DR Shepherd (ENG)
Player of the match: IVA Richards (WI)

- India won the toss and elected to bat.

14 October 1989
Scorecard
Wisden report

| Pakistan; 250/8 (50 overs) | v | West Indies; 239 (48.4 overs) |
| Saleem Malik 74 (81); IR Bishop 3/49 (10 overs) | | DL Haynes 59 (94); Wasim Akram 5/39 (9.4 overs) |

Pakistan won by 11 runs
Sharjah Cricket Stadium, Sharjah, UAE
Umpires: DP Buultjens (SL) and SG Ponnadurai (SL)
Player of the match: Wasim Akram (PAK)

- West Indies won the toss and elected to field.
- Shahid Saeed and Waqar Younis (PAK) made their ODI debuts.

15 October 1989
Scorecard
Wisden report

| India; 273/4 (46 overs) | v | Pakistan; 274/4 (44.4 overs) |
| NS Sidhu 108 (121); Wasim Akram 3/30 (9 overs) | | Saleem Malik 68* (58); RJ Shastri 2/60 (9 overs) |

Pakistan won by 6 wickets
Sharjah Cricket Stadium, Sharjah, UAE
Umpires: HD Bird (ENG) and DR Shepherd (ENG)
Player of the match: NS Sidhu (IND)

- India won the toss and elected to bat.
- The match was reduced to 46 overs per side.
- Navjot Singh Sidhu (Ind) scored his first century in ODIs.

16 October 1989
Scorecard
Wisden report

| India; 211/9 (50 overs) | v | West Indies; 174 (46.4 overs) |
| Kapil Dev 41 (50); CA Walsh 2/32 (10 overs) | | MD Marshall 40 (47); Kapil Dev 2/19 (7.4 overs) |

India won by 37 runs
Sharjah Cricket Stadium, Sharjah, UAE
Umpires: DP Buultjens (SL) and SG Ponnadurai (SL)
Player of the match: Kapil Dev (IND)

- West Indies won the toss and elected to field.

17 October 1989
Scorecard
Wisden report

| Pakistan; 237/7 (50 overs) | v | West Indies; 180 (44.4 overs) |
| Imran Khan 60 (56); CEL Ambrose 2/43 (10 overs) | | CA Best 44 (74); Waqar Younis 3/28 (9 overs) |

Pakistan won by 57 runs
Sharjah Cricket Stadium, Sharjah, UAE
Umpires: HD Bird (ENG) and DR Shepherd (ENG)
Player of the match: Imran Khan (PAK)

- Pakistan won the toss and elected to bat.
- Sohail Fazal (PAK) and RC Haynes (WI) made their ODI debuts.

20 October 1989
Scorecard
Wisden report

| Pakistan; 252/4 (47 overs) | v | India; 214/9 (47 overs) |
| Saleem Malik 102 (115); M Prabhakar 2/45 (10 overs) | | DB Vengsarkar 35 (75); Aaqib Javed 3/49 (10 overs) |

Pakistan won by 38 runs
Sharjah Cricket Stadium, Sharjah, UAE
Umpires: HD Bird (ENG) and DR Shepherd (ENG)
Player of the match: Saleem Malik (PAK)

- India won the toss and elected to field.
- The match was reduced to 47 overs per side.

== See also ==
- Sharjah Cup
