= Sharjah Cup =

Cricket tournament in UAE

The Champions Trophy
- Format: One Day International
- First edition: 1984 UAE
- Latest edition: 2003 UAE
- Next edition: DISSOLVED
- Most successful: Pakistan (15 titles)

The Champions Trophy was an international limited-overs cricket tournament that took place at the Sharjah Cricket Association Stadium in Sharjah, UAE on multiple occasions between 1984 and 2003.

The stadium usually hosted two tournaments each season: a "Champions Trophy" in October/November, and a "Cup" in March/April. Typically three teams would participate in the tournament, but the format would vary, with as few as two and as many as six teams appearing. The team which competed most often in the Sharjah Cup was Pakistan, who appeared in 28 of the 32 tournaments; Pakistan are also its most successful team, with a total of 15 titles.

== Tournament results by season ==
Tournament	Winner	Runner-up	Third-place	Other teams
Rothmans Asia Cup; April 1984	India	Sri Lanka	Pakistan	
Rothmans Four-Nations Cup; March 1985	India	Australia	Pakistan	England
Rothmans Sharjah Cup; November 1985	West Indies	Pakistan	India	
Austral-Asia Cup; April 1986	Pakistan	India	New Zealand; Sri Lanka	Australia
Champions Trophy; November/December 1986	West Indies	Pakistan	India	Sri Lanka
Sharjah Cup; April 1987	England	Pakistan	India	Australia
Sharjah Cup; March/April 1988	India	New Zealand	Sri Lanka	
Champions Trophy; October 1988	West Indies	Pakistan	India	
Sharjah Cup; March 1989	Pakistan	Sri Lanka		
Champions Trophy; October 1989	Pakistan	India	West Indies	
Austral-Asia Cup; April/May 1990	Pakistan	Australia	New Zealand; Sri Lanka	Bangladesh; India
Sharjah Cup; December 1990	Pakistan	Sri Lanka		
Wills Trophy; October 1991	Pakistan	India	West Indies	
Wills Trophy; February 1993	Pakistan	Sri Lanka	Zimbabwe	
Pepsi Champions Trophy; October/November 1993	West Indies	Pakistan	Sri Lanka	
Pepsi Austral-Asia Cup; April 1994	Pakistan	India	Australia; New Zealand	Sri Lanka; United Arab Emirates
Pepsi Asia Cup; April 1995	India	Sri Lanka	Pakistan	Bangladesh
Singer Champions Trophy; October 1995	Sri Lanka	West Indies	Pakistan	
Pepsi Sharjah Cup; April 1996	South Africa	India	Pakistan	
Singer Champions Trophy; November 1996	Pakistan	New Zealand	Sri Lanka	
Singer-Akai Cup; April 1997	Sri Lanka	Pakistan	Zimbabwe	
Singer-Akai Champions Trophy; December 1997	England	West Indies	Pakistan	India
Coca-Cola Sharjah Cup; April 1998	India	Australia	New Zealand	
Coca-Cola Champions Trophy; November 1998	India	Zimbabwe	Sri Lanka	
Coca-Cola Sharjah Cup; April 1999	Pakistan	India	England	
Coca-Cola Champions Trophy; October 1999	Pakistan	Sri Lanka	West Indies	
Coca-Cola Sharjah Cup; March 2000	Pakistan	South Africa	India	
2000-01 Sharjah Champions Trophy; October 2000	Sri Lanka	India	Zimbabwe	
ARY Gold Cup; April 2001	Sri Lanka	Pakistan	New Zealand	
Khaleej Times Trophy; October/November 2001	Pakistan	Sri Lanka	Zimbabwe	
Sharjah Cup; April 2002	Pakistan	Sri Lanka	New Zealand	
Cherry Blossom Sharjah Cup; April 2003	Pakistan	Zimbabwe	Sri Lanka	Kenya
