= International cricket in 1986–87 =

International cricket season

The 1986–87 international cricket season was from September 1986 to April 1987.

== Season overview ==
International tours
Start date	Home team	Away team	Results [Matches]			
Start date	Home team	Away team	Test	ODI	FC	LA
7 September 1986	India	Australia	0–0 [3]	3–2 [6]	—	—
17 October 1986	Pakistan	West Indies	1–1 [3]	1–4 [5]	—	—
14 November 1986	Australia	England	1–2 [5]	—	—	—
17 December 1986	India	Sri Lanka	2–0 [3]	4–1 [5]	—	—
27 January 1987	India	Pakistan	0–1 [5]	1–5 [6]	—	—
20 February 1987	New Zealand	West Indies	1–1 [3]	0–3 [4]	—	—
International tournaments
Start date	Tournament				Winners	
27 November 1986	(United Arab Emirates) 1986–87 Champions Trophy				West Indies	
30 December 1986	(Australia) 1986–87 Benson & Hedges Challenge				England	
17 January 1987	(Australia) 1986–87 Benson & Hedges World Series				England	
2 April 1987	(United Arab Emirates) 1986–87 Sharjah Cup				England	

== September ==
=== Australia in India ===
Test series
No.	Date	Home captain	Away captain	Venue	Result
Test 1052	18–22 September	Kapil Dev	Allan Border	MA Chidambaram Stadium, Chennai	Match tied
Test 1053	26–30 September	Kapil Dev	Allan Border	Arun Jaitley Stadium, Delhi	Match drawn
Test 1054	15–19 October	Kapil Dev	Allan Border	Wankhede Stadium, Mumbai	Match drawn
ODI series
No.	Date	Home captain	Away captain	Venue	Result
ODI 390	7 September	Kapil Dev	Allan Border	Sawai Mansingh Stadium, Jaipur	India by 7 wickets
ODI 391	9 September	Kapil Dev	Allan Border	Sher-i-Kashmir Stadium, Srinagar	Australia by 3 wickets
ODI 392	24 September	Kapil Dev	Allan Border	Lal Bahadur Shastri Stadium, Hyderabad	No result
ODI 393	2 October	Kapil Dev	Allan Border	Arun Jaitley Stadium, Delhi	India by 3 wickets
ODI 394	5 October	Kapil Dev	Allan Border	Sardar Patel Stadium, Ahmedabad	India by 52 runs
ODI 395	7 October	Kapil Dev	Allan Border	Madhavrao Scindia Cricket Ground, Rajkot	Australia by 7 wickets

== October ==
=== West Indies in Pakistan ===
Test series
No.	Date	Home captain	Away captain	Venue	Result
Test 1055	24–29 October	Imran Khan	Viv Richards	Iqbal Stadium, Faisalabad	Pakistan by 186 runs
Test 1056	7–9 November	Imran Khan	Viv Richards	Gaddafi Stadium, Lahore	West Indies by an innings and 10 runs
Test 1058	20–25 November	Imran Khan	Viv Richards	National Stadium, Karachi	Match drawn
ODI series
No.	Date	Home captain	Away captain	Venue	Result
ODI 396	17 October	Imran Khan	Viv Richards	Arbab Niaz Stadium, Peshawar	Pakistan by 4 wickets
ODI 397	4 November	Javed Miandad	Viv Richards	Jinnah Stadium, Gujranwala	West Indies by 17 runs
ODI 398	14 November	Imran Khan	Viv Richards	Jinnah Stadium, Sialkot	West Indies by 4 wickets
ODI 399	17 November	Imran Khan	Viv Richards	Ibn-e-Qasim Bagh Stadium, Multan	West Indies by 89 runs
ODI 400	18 November	Imran Khan	Viv Richards	Niaz Stadium, Hyderabad	Pakistan by 11 runs

== November ==
=== England in Australia ===
The Ashes - Test Series
No.	Date	Home captain	Away captain	Venue	Result
Test 1057	14–19 November	Allan Border	Mike Gatting	The Gabba, Brisbane	England by 7 wickets
Test 1059	28 November–3 December	Allan Border	Mike Gatting	WACA Ground, Perth	Match drawn
Test 1060	12–16 December	Allan Border	Mike Gatting	Adelaide Oval, Adelaide	Match drawn
Test 1062	26–30 December	Allan Border	Mike Gatting	Melbourne Cricket Ground, Melbourne	England by an innings and 14 runs
Test 1065	10–15 January	Allan Border	Mike Gatting	Sydney Cricket Ground, Sydney	Australia by 55 runs

=== 1986–87 Champions Trophy ===
Team	P	W	L	T	NR	RR	Points
West Indies	3	3	0	0	0	4.792	12
Pakistan	3	2	1	0	0	3.419	8
India	3	1	2	0	0	3.985	4
Sri Lanka	3	0	3	0	0	3.207	0

First round
No.	Date	Team 1	Captain 1	Team 2	Captain 2	Venue	Result
ODI 401	27 November	India	Kapil Dev	Sri Lanka	Duleep Mendis	Sharjah Cricket Stadium, Sharjah	India by 7 wickets
ODI 402	28 November	Pakistan	Imran Khan	West Indies	Viv Richards	Sharjah Cricket Stadium, Sharjah	West Indies by 9 wickets
ODI 403	30 November	India	Kapil Dev	West Indies	Viv Richards	Sharjah Cricket Stadium, Sharjah	West Indies by 33 runs
ODI 404	2 December	Pakistan	Imran Khan	Sri Lanka	Duleep Mendis	Sharjah Cricket Stadium, Sharjah	Pakistan by 4 wickets
ODI 405	3 December	Sri Lanka	Duleep Mendis	West Indies	Viv Richards	Sharjah Cricket Stadium, Sharjah	West Indies by 193 runs
ODI 406	5 December	India	Kapil Dev	Pakistan	Imran Khan	Sharjah Cricket Stadium, Sharjah	Pakistan by 3 wickets

== December ==
=== Sri Lanka in India ===
Test series
No.	Date	Home captain	Away captain	Venue	Result
Test 1061	17–22 December	Kapil Dev	Duleep Mendis	Green Park Stadium, Kanpur	Match drawn
Test 1063	27–31 December	Kapil Dev	Duleep Mendis	Vidarbha C.A. Ground, Nagpur	India by an innings and 106 runs
Test 1064	4–7 January	Kapil Dev	Duleep Mendis	Barabati Stadium, Cuttack	India by an innings and 67 runs
ODI series
No.	Date	Home captain	Away captain	Venue	Result
ODI 407	24 December	Kapil Dev	Duleep Mendis	Green Park Stadium, Kanpur	Sri Lanka by 117
ODI 415	11 January	Kapil Dev	Duleep Mendis	Nehru Stadium, Guwahati	India by 8 wickets
ODI 416	13 January	Kapil Dev	Duleep Mendis	Arun Jaitley Stadium, Delhi	India by 6 wickets
ODI 417	15 January	Kapil Dev	Duleep Mendis	Moti Bagh Stadium, Vadodara	India by 94 runs
ODI 419	17 January	Kapil Dev	Duleep Mendis	Wankhede Stadium, Mumbai	India by 10 runs

=== 1986–87 Benson & Hedges Challenge ===
Group stage
No.	Date	Team 1	Captain 1	Team 2	Captain 2	Venue	Result
ODI 408	30 December	Pakistan	Imran Khan	West Indies	Viv Richards	WACA Ground, Perth	Pakistan by 34 runs
ODI 409	1 January	Australia	Allan Border	England	Mike Gatting	WACA Ground, Perth	England by 37 runs
ODI 410	2 January	Australia	Allan Border	Pakistan	Imran Khan	WACA Ground, Perth	Pakistan by 1 wicket
ODI 411	3 January	England	Mike Gatting	West Indies	Viv Richards	WACA Ground, Perth	England by 19 runs
ODI 412	4 January	Australia	Allan Border	West Indies	Viv Richards	WACA Ground, Perth	West Indies by 164 runs
ODI 413	5 January	England	Mike Gatting	Pakistan	Imran Khan	WACA Ground, Perth	England by 3 wickets
Final
ODI 414	7 January	England	Mike Gatting	Pakistan	Imran Khan	WACA Ground, Perth	England by 5 wickets

== January ==
=== 1986–87 Benson & Hedges World Series ===
Group stage
No.	Date	Team 1	Captain 1	Team 2	Captain 2	Venue	Result
ODI 418	17 January	England	Mike Gatting	West Indies	Viv Richards	Brisbane Cricket Ground, Brisbane	England by 6 wickets
ODI 420	18 January	Australia	Allan Border	England	Mike Gatting	Brisbane Cricket Ground, Brisbane	Australia by 11 runs
ODI 421	20 January	Australia	Allan Border	West Indies	Viv Richards	Melbourne Cricket Ground, Melbourne	West Indies by 7 wickets
ODI 422	22 January	Australia	Allan Border	England	Mike Gatting	Sydney Cricket Ground, Sydney	England by 3 wickets
ODI 423	24 January	England	Mike Gatting	West Indies	Viv Richards	Adelaide Oval, Adelaide	England by 89 runs
ODI 424	25 January	Australia	Allan Border	West Indies	Viv Richards	Adelaide Oval, Adelaide	West Indies by 16 runs
ODI 425	22 January	Australia	Allan Border	England	Mike Gatting	Adelaide Oval, Adelaide	Australia by 33 runs
ODI 427	28 January	Australia	Allan Border	West Indies	Viv Richards	Sydney Cricket Ground, Sydney	Australia by 36 runs
ODI 428	30 January	England	Mike Gatting	West Indies	Viv Richards	Melbourne Cricket Ground, Melbourne	West Indies by 6 wickets
ODI 429	1 February	Australia	Allan Border	England	Mike Gatting	Melbourne Cricket Ground, Melbourne	Australia by 109 runs
ODI 430	3 February	England	Mike Gatting	West Indies	Viv Richards	Devonport Oval, Devonport	England by 29 runs
ODI 431	6 February	Australia	Allan Border	West Indies	Viv Richards	Sydney Cricket Ground, Sydney	Australia by 2 wickets
Final
ODI 432	8 February	Australia	Allan Border	England	Mike Gatting	Melbourne Cricket Ground, Melbourne	England by 6 wickets
ODI 433	11 February	Australia	Allan Border	England	Mike Gatting	Sydney Cricket Ground, Sydney	England by 8 runs

=== Pakistan in India ===
Test series
No.	Date	Home captain	Away captain	Venue	Result
Test 1066	3–8 February	Kapil Dev	Imran Khan	MA Chidambaram Stadium, Chennai	Match drawn
Test 1067	11–16 February	Kapil Dev	Imran Khan	Eden Gardens, Kolkata	Match drawn
Test 1069	21–26 February	Kapil Dev	Imran Khan	Sawai Mansingh Stadium, Jaipur	Match drawn
Test 1071	4–9 March	Kapil Dev	Imran Khan	Sardar Patel Stadium, Ahmedabad	Match drawn
Test 1073	13–17 March	Kapil Dev	Imran Khan	M.Chinnaswamy Stadium, Bengaluru	Pakistan by 16 runs
ODI series
No.	Date	Home captain	Away captain	Venue	Result
ODI 426	27 January	Ravi Shastri	Imran Khan	Nehru Stadium, Indore	Pakistan by 3 wickets
ODI 434	18 February	Kapil Dev	Imran Khan	Eden Gardens, Kolkata	Pakistan by 2 wickets
ODI 436	20 March	Kapil Dev	Imran Khan	Lal Bahadur Shastri Stadium, Hyderabad	India (fewer wickets lost)
ODI 438	22 March	Kapil Dev	Imran Khan	Nehru Stadium, Pune	Pakistan by 6 wickets
ODI 439	24 March	Kapil Dev	Imran Khan	Vidarbha C.A. Ground, Nagpur	Pakistan by 41 runs
ODI 440	26 March	Kapil Dev	Imran Khan	Keenan Stadium, Jamshedpur	Pakistan by 5 wickets

== February ==
=== West Indies in New Zealand ===
Test series
No.	Date	Home captain	Away captain	Venue	Result
Test 1068	20–24 February	Jeremy Coney	Viv Richards	Basin Reserve, Wellington	Match drawn
Test 1070	27 February–3 March	Jeremy Coney	Viv Richards	Eden Park, Auckland	West Indies 10 wickets
Test 1072	12–15 March	Jeremy Coney	Viv Richards	Lancaster Park, Christchurch	New Zealand 5 wickets
ODI series
No.	Date	Home captain	Away captain	Venue	Result
ODI 435	18 March	Jeremy Coney	Viv Richards	Carisbrook, Dunedin	West Indies by 95 runs
ODI 437	21 March	Jeremy Coney	Viv Richards	Eden Park, Auckland	West Indies by 6 wickets
ODI 439a	25–26 March	Jeremy Coney	Viv Richards	Basin Reserve, Wellington	Match abandoned
ODI 441	28 March	Jeremy Coney	Viv Richards	AMI Stadium, Christchurch	West Indies by 10 wickets

== April ==
=== 1986–87 Sharjah Cup ===
Team	P	W	L	T	NR	RR	Points
England	3	2	1	0	0	4.46	4
Pakistan	3	2	1	0	0	4.17	4
India	3	2	1	0	0	4.07	4
Australia	3	0	3	0	0	3.80	0

Group stage
No.	Date	Team 1	Captain 1	Team 2	Captain 2	Venue	Result
ODI 442	2 April	England	John Emburey	India	Kapil Dev	Sharjah Cricket Stadium, Sharjah	India by 3 wickets
ODI 443	3 April	Australia	Allan Border	Pakistan	Javed Miandad	Sharjah Cricket Stadium, Sharjah	Pakistan by 6 wickets
ODI 444	5 April	Australia	Geoff Marsh	India	Kapil Dev	Sharjah Cricket Stadium, Sharjah	India by 7 wickets
ODI 445	7 April	England	John Emburey	Pakistan	Imran Khan	Sharjah Cricket Stadium, Sharjah	England by 5 wickets
ODI 446	9 April	Australia	Allan Border	England	John Emburey	Sharjah Cricket Stadium, Sharjah	England by 11 runs
ODI 447	10 April	India	Kapil Dev	Pakistan	Imran Khan	Sharjah Cricket Stadium, Sharjah	Pakistan by 8 wickets
