= 1988–89 Champions Trophy =

International cricket tournament

1988 Champions Trophy
- Cricket format: One Day International
- Host: United Arab Emirates
- Champions: West Indies
- Runners-up: Pakistan
- Participants: 3
- Matches: 5
- Player of the series: (Cricket West Indies) CG Greenidge
- Most runs: (Cricket West Indies) CG Greenidge (243)
- Most wickets: (Cricket West Indies) CEL Ambrose (8) (India) SK Sharma (8)

The 1988 Champions Trophy was a cricket tournament held in Sharjah, UAE, between October 16–22, 1988. Three national teams took part: India, Pakistan and West Indies.

The 1988 Champions Trophy started with a round-robin tournament where each team played the other once. The leading team qualified for the final in a knock-out tournament while the second and third-placed team contested a semi-final for the right to contest the final.

West Indies won the tournament and US$30,000 (£17,250) in prize money. Pakistan, the runners-up, received $US20,000 (£11,500) and India $US15,000 (£8,625).

The main beneficiaries of the tournament were Mohsin Khan and Ravi Shastri who received US$50,000 (£28.750). The minor beneficiaries were Munir Malik and Bhagwat Chandrasekhar who received US$15,000 (£8,625).

== Matches ==
=== Group stage ===
Team	P	W	L	T	NR	RR	Points
Pakistan	2	2	0	0	0	5.4	8
India	2	1	1	0	0	4.5	4
West Indies	2	0	2	0	0	4.3	0

Key	
	Qualified for final
	Qualified for semi-final

16 October 1988
Scorecard
Wisden report

India; 238/5 (50 overs)	v	West Indies; 215 (48.3 overs)
K Srikkanth 112 (113); CL Hooper 3/32 (7 overs)		DL Haynes 87 (121); SK Sharma 5/26 (7.3 overs)

India won by 23 runs
Sharjah Cricket Stadium, Sharjah, UAE
Umpires: HD Bird (ENG) and DR Shepherd (ENG)
Player of the match: K Srikkanth (IND)

- West Indies won the toss and elected to field.

18 October 1988
Scorecard
Wisden report

Pakistan; 294/6 (50 overs)	v	West Indies; 210/5 (50 overs)
Javed Miandad 79 (67); CEL Ambrose 2/41 (9 overs)		CG Greenidge 102* (154); Wasim Akram 3/37 (9 overs)

Pakistan won by 84 runs
Sharjah Cricket Stadium, Sharjah, UAE
Umpires: HD Bird (ENG) and DR Shepherd (ENG)
Player of the match: Wasim Akram (PAK)

- West Indies won the toss and elected to field.

19 October 1988
Scorecard
Wisden report

Pakistan; 246 (49.1 overs)	v	India; 212/8 (50 overs)
Saleem Malik 101 (124); Maninder Singh 3/47 (10 overs)		DB Vengsarkar 51 (71); Saleem Jaffar 3/37 (9 overs)

Pakistan won by 34 runs
Sharjah Cricket Stadium, Sharjah, UAE
Umpires: HD Bird (ENG) and DR Shepherd (ENG)
Player of the match: Saleem Malik (PAK)

- India won the toss and elected to field.
- Attendance=20,000.

=== Semi-final ===
21 October 1988
Scorecard
Wisden report

India; 169/7 (50 overs)	v	West Indies; 175/2 (40 overs)
RJ Shastri 35 (90); CA Walsh 2/19 (6 overs)		DL Haynes 85 (121); SK Sharma 2/25 (6 overs)

West Indies won by 8 wickets
Sharjah Cricket Stadium, Sharjah, UAE
Umpires: HD Bird (ENG) and DR Shepherd (ENG)
Player of the match: DL Haynes (WIN)

- India won the toss and elected to bat.

=== Final ===
22 October 1988
Scorecard
Wisden report

West Indies; 235/6 (50 overs)	v	Pakistan; 224 (49.4 overs)
CL Hooper 62 (71); Abdul Qadir 2/41 (10 overs)		Javed Miandad 76 (120); CEL Ambrose 4/29 (10 overs)

West Indies won by 11 runs
Sharjah Cricket Stadium, Sharjah, UAE
Umpires: HD Bird (ENG) and DR Shepherd (ENG)
Player of the match: CEL Ambrose (WIN)

- Pakistan won the toss and elected to field.
- KLT Arthurton (WIN) made his ODI debut.
- Attendance=20,000.

== See also ==
- Sharjah Cup
