= 1999–2000 Coca-Cola Champions Trophy =

Champions Trophy

1999-2000 Cocal-Cola Champions Trophy
- Date: 13-22 October 1999
- Location: Sharjah, United Arab Emirates
- Result: Won by Pakistan
- Player of the series: Inzamam-ul-Haq (PAK)
Teams
Pakistan	Sri Lanka	West Indies
Captains
Wasim Akram	Sanath Jayasuriya	Brian Lara
Most runs
Inzamam-ul-Haq (261)	Romesh Kaluwitharana (167)	Wavell Hinds (114)
Most wickets
Azhar Mahmood (13)	Chaminda Vaas (8); Muttiah Muralitharan (8)	Nehemiah Perry (5)

The 1999–2000 Coca-Cola Champions Trophy was a triangular ODI cricket competition held in Sharjah, United Arab Emirates from 13 to 22 October 1999. It featured the national cricket teams of Pakistan, Sri Lanka and West Indies. Its official sponsor was Coca-Cola. The tournament was won by Pakistan, who defeated Sri Lanka in the final.

== Points table ==
Team	Pld	W	L	T	NR	NRR	Pts
Pakistan	4	3	0	1	0	+1.93	7
Sri Lanka	4	1	2	1	0	-0.217	3
West Indies	4	1	3	0	0	−1.839	2

== Group stage ==
=== 1st ODI ===
13 October (D/N)
Scorecard

Sri Lanka; 178 (49.3 overs)	v	West Indies; 181/7 (49.2 overs)
Romesh Kaluwitharana 36 (41); Nixon McLean 2/40 (8.3 overs)		Jimmy Adams 74* (124); Chaminda Vaas 2/22 (8 overs)

West Indies won by 3 wickets
Sharjah Cricket Association Stadium, Sharjah
Umpires: Steve Dunne (NZ) and David Shepherd (ENG)
Player of the match: Jimmy Adams (WIN)

- Sri Lanka won the toss and elected to bat.

=== 2nd ODI ===
14 October (D/N)
Scorecard

Pakistan; 260/5 (50 overs)	v	West Indies; 130 (34.4 overs)
Saeed Anwar 72 (87); Nehemiah Perry 2/53 (9 overs)		Ricardo Powell 36 (36); Abdul Razzaq 2/26 (8 overs)

Pakistan won by 130 runs
Sharjah Cricket Association Stadium, Sharjah
Umpires: Steve Dunne and Doug Cowie (both NZ)
Player of the match: Saeed Anwar (PAK)

- Pakistan won the toss and elected to bat.
- Shoaib Malik (PAK) made his ODI debut.

=== 3rd ODI ===
15 October (D/N)
Scorecard

Pakistan; 196 (49.4 overs)	v	Sri Lanka; 196 (49.1 overs)
Mohammad Yousuf 48 (90); Chaminda Vaas 2/29 (8 overs)		Romesh Kaluwitharana 75 (108); Abdul Razzaq 5/31 (9.1 overs)

Match Tied
Sharjah Cricket Association Stadium, Sharjah
Umpires: David Shepherd (ENG) and Doug Cowie (NZ)
Player of the match: Abdul Razzaq (PAK)

- Pakistan won the toss and elected to bat.

=== 4th ODI ===
17 October (D/N)
Scorecard

West Indies; 145 (49.3 overs)	v	Sri Lanka; 146/1 (28 overs)
Wavell Hinds 58 (117); Muttiah Muralitharan 3/22 (9.3 overs)		Sanath Jayasuriya 88 (80); Nehemiah Perry 1/45 (8 overs)

Sri Lanka won by 9 wickets
Sharjah Cricket Association Stadium, Sharjah
Umpires: David Shepherd (ENG) and Steve Dunne (NZ)
Player of the match: Sanath Jayasuriya (PAK)

- West Indies won the toss and elected to bat.

=== 5th ODI ===
18 October (D/N)
Scorecard

Pakistan; 239/8 (50 overs)	v	Sri Lanka; 121 (33.4 overs)
Abdul Razzaq 59* (51); Sanath Jayasuriya 3/41 (10 overs)		Aravinda de Silva 35 (50); Shahid Afridi 2/6 (3 overs)

Pakistan won by 118 runs
Sharjah Cricket Association Stadium, Sharjah
Umpires: David Shepherd (ENG) and Doug Cowie (NZ)
Player of the match: Shahid Afridi (PAK)

- Pakistan won the toss and elected to bat.

=== 6th ODI ===
19 October (D/N)
Scorecard

Pakistan; 255/5 (50 overs)	v	West Indies; 117 (31.3 overs)
Hasan Raza 77 (120); Reon King 2/52 (10 overs)		Brian Lara 30 (51); Azhar Mahmood 6/18 (10 overs)

Pakistan won by 138 runs
Sharjah Cricket Association Stadium, Sharjah
Umpires: Steve Dunne and Doug Cowie (both NZ)
Player of the match: Azhar Mahmood (PAK)

- Pakistan won the toss and elected to bat.

== Final ==
22 October (D/N)
Scorecard

Pakistan; 211/9 (50 overs)	v	Sri Lanka; 123 (36 overs)
Inzamam-ul-Haq 54 (78); Upul Chandana 3/40 (10 overs)		Russell Arnold 27* (44); Azhar Mahmood 5/28 (10 overs)

Pakistan won by 88 runs
Sharjah Cricket Association Stadium, Sharjah
Umpires: David Shepherd (ENG) and Doug Cowie (NZ)
Player of the match: Azhar Mahmood (PAK)

- Pakistan won the toss and elected to bat.
- Pakistan won the 1999–00 Coca-Cola Champions Trophy
