= International cricket in 1996–97 =

International cricket season

The 1996–1997 international cricket season was from September 1996 to April 1997.

== Season overview ==
International tours
Start date	Home team	Away team	Results [Matches]			
Start date	Home team	Away team	Test	ODI	FC	LA
10 October 1996	India	Australia	1–0 [1]	—	—	—
17 October 1996	Pakistan	Zimbabwe	1–0 [2]	3–0 [3]	—	—
20 November 1996	India	South Africa	2–1 [3]	1–0 [1]	—	—
21 November 1996	Pakistan	New Zealand	1–1 [2]	2–1 [3]	—	—
22 November 1996	Australia	West Indies	3–2 [5]	—	—	—
18 December 1996	Zimbabwe	England	0–0 [2]	3–0 [3]	—	—
26 December 1996	South Africa	India	2–0 [3]	—	—	—
24 January 1997	New Zealand	England	0–2 [3]	2–2 [5]	—	—
15 February 1997	Zimbabwe	India	—	1–0 [1]	—	—
28 February 1997	South Africa	Australia	1–2 [3]	3–4 [7]	—	—
6 March 1997	West Indies	India	1–0 [5]	3–1 [4]	—	—
7 March 1997	New Zealand	Sri Lanka	2–0 [2]	1–1 [2]	—	—
19 April 1997	Sri Lanka	Pakistan	0–0 [2]	—	—	—
International tournaments
Start date	Tournament				Winners	
28 September 1996	(Kenya) Sameer Cup 1996–97				South Africa	
17 October 1996	(India) Titan Cup				India	
7 November 1996	(United Arab Emirates) 1996–97 Singer Champions Trophy				Pakistan	
6 December 1996	(Australia) 1996–97 Carlton and United Series				Pakistan	
23 January 1997	(South Africa) 1996-97 Standard Bank International One-Day Series				South Africa	
3 April 1997	(United Arab Emirates) 1996–97 Singer Akai Cup				Sri Lanka	

== September ==
=== KCA Centenary Tournament 1996-97 ===
Place	Team	Played	Won	Lost	Points	NetRR
1	South Africa	3	2	1	4	1.518
2	Pakistan	3	2	1	4	0.498
3	Sri Lanka	3	2	1	4	0.496
4	Kenya	3	0	3	0	-2.396

Group stage
No.	Date	Team 1	Captain 1	Team 2	Captain 2	Venue	Result
ODI 1120	28 September	Kenya	Maurice Odumbe	Sri Lanka	Arjuna Ranatunga	Gymkhana Club Ground, Nairobi	Sri Lanka by 7 wickets
ODI 1121	29 September	Pakistan	Wasim Akram	South Africa	Hansie Cronje	Gymkhana Club Ground, Nairobi	South Africa by 62 runs
ODI 1122	1 October	South Africa	Hansie Cronje	Sri Lanka	Arjuna Ranatunga	Nairobi Club Ground, Nairobi	Sri Lanka by 2 wickets
ODI 1123	2 October	Kenya	Maurice Odumbe	Pakistan	Saeed Anwar	Aga Khan Sports Club Ground, Nairobi	Pakistan by 4 wickets
ODI 1124	3 October	Kenya	Maurice Odumbe	South Africa	Hansie Cronje	Gymkhana Club Ground, Nairobi	South Africa by 202 runs
ODI 1125	4 October	Pakistan	Saeed Anwar	Sri Lanka	Arjuna Ranatunga	Gymkhana Club Ground, Nairobi	Pakistan by 82 runs
Final
No.	Date	Team 1	Captain 1	Team 2	Captain 2	Venue	Result
ODI 1126	6 October	Pakistan	Saeed Anwar	South Africa	Hansie Cronje	Gymkhana Club Ground, Nairobi	South Africa by 7 wickets

== October ==
=== Australia in India ===
Border–Gavaskar Trophy Test series
No.	Date	Home captain	Away captain	Venue	Result
Test 1335	10–13 October	Sachin Tendulkar	Mark Taylor	Feroz Shah Kotla, Delhi	India by 7 wickets

=== Zimbabwe in Pakistan ===
Test series
No.	Date	Home captain	Away captain	Venue	Result
Test 1336	17–21 October	Wasim Akram	Alistair Campbell	Sheikhupura Stadium, Sheikhupura	Match drawn
Test 1337	24–26 October	Wasim Akram	Alistair Campbell	Iqbal Stadium, Faisalabad	Pakistan by 10 wickets
ODI series
No.	Date	Home captain	Away captain	Venue	Result
ODI 1133	30 October	Wasim Akram	Alistair Campbell	Bugti Stadium, Quetta	Pakistan by 3 wickets
ODI 1135	1 November	Wasim Akram	Alistair Campbell	Gaddafi Stadium, Lahore	Pakistan by 9 wickets
ODI 1136	3 November	Wasim Akram	Alistair Campbell	Arbab Niaz Stadium, Peshawar	Pakistan by 78 runs

=== Titan Cup 1996-97 ===
Team	Pld	W	L	T	NR	Pts	NRR
South Africa	6	6	0	0	0	12	+0.478
India	6	2	3	0	1	5	–0.289
Australia	6	0	5	0	1	1	–0.296

Group stage
No.	Date	Team 1	Captain 1	Team 2	Captain 2	Venue	Result
ODI 1127	17 October	India	Sachin Tendulkar	South Africa	Hansie Cronje	Lal Bahadur Shastri Stadium, Hyderabad	South Africa by 47 runs
ODI 1128	19 October	Australia	Mark Taylor	South Africa	Hansie Cronje	Nehru Stadium, Indore	South Africa by 7 wickets
ODI 1129	21 October	India	Sachin Tendulkar	Australia	Mark Taylor	M. Chinnaswamy Stadium, Bangalore	India by 2 wickets
ODI 1130	23 October	India	Sachin Tendulkar	South Africa	Hansie Cronje	Sawai Mansingh Stadium, Jaipur	South Africa by 27 runs
ODI 1131	25 October	Australia	Mark Taylor	South Africa	Hansie Cronje	Nahar Singh Stadium, Faridabad	South Africa by 2 wickets
ODI 1131a	27 October	India	Sachin Tendulkar	Australia	Mark Taylor	Barabati Stadium, Cuttack	Match abandoned
ODI 1132	29 October	India	Sachin Tendulkar	South Africa	Hansie Cronje	Madhavrao Scindia Cricket Ground, Rajkot	South Africa by 5 wickets
ODI 1134	1 November	Australia	Mark Taylor	South Africa	Hansie Cronje	Nehru Stadium, Guwahati	South Africa by 8 wickets
ODI 1137	3 November	India	Sachin Tendulkar	Australia	Mark Taylor	Punjab Cricket Association IS Bindra Stadium, Mohali	India by 5 runs
Final
No.	Date	Team 1	Captain 1	Team 2	Captain 2	Venue	Result
ODI 1138	6 November	India	Sachin Tendulkar	South Africa	Hansie Cronje	Wankhede Stadium, Mumbai	India by 35 runs

== November ==
=== Singer Champions Trophy 1996-97 ===
Team	P	W	L	T	NR	NRR	Points
Pakistan	4	3	1	0	0	-0.174	6
New Zealand	4	1	2	1	0	0.025	3
Sri Lanka	4	1	2	1	0	0.151	3

Group stage
No.	Date	Team 1	Captain 1	Team 2	Captain 2	Venue	Result
ODI 1139	7 November	New Zealand	Lee Germon	Sri Lanka	Arjuna Ranatunga	Sharjah Cricket Stadium, Sharjah	New Zealand by 29 runs
ODI 1140	8 November	Pakistan	Wasim Akram	Sri Lanka	Arjuna Ranatunga	Sharjah Cricket Stadium, Sharjah	Sri Lanka by 75 runs
ODI 1141	10 November	New Zealand	Lee Germon	Pakistan	Wasim Akram	Sharjah Cricket Stadium, Sharjah	Pakistan by 4 wickets
ODI 1142	11 November	New Zealand	Lee Germon	Sri Lanka	Arjuna Ranatunga	Sharjah Cricket Stadium, Sharjah	Match tied
ODI 1143	12 November	Pakistan	Wasim Akram	Sri Lanka	Arjuna Ranatunga	Sharjah Cricket Stadium, Sharjah	Pakistan by 8 wickets
ODI 1144	13 November	New Zealand	Lee Germon	Pakistan	Wasim Akram	Sharjah Cricket Stadium, Sharjah	Pakistan by 4 wickets
Final
No.	Date	Team 1	Captain 1	Team 2	Captain 2	Venue	Result
ODI 1145	15 November	New Zealand	Lee Germon	Pakistan	Wasim Akram	Sharjah Cricket Stadium, Sharjah	Pakistan by 41 runs

=== South Africa in India ===
Test series
No.	Date	Home captain	Away captain	Venue	Result
Test 1338	20–23 November	Sachin Tendulkar	Hansie Cronje	Sardar Patel Stadium, Ahmedabad	India by 64 runs
Test 1341	27 November-1 December	Sachin Tendulkar	Hansie Cronje	Eden Gardens, Kolkata	South Africa by 329 runs
Test 1344	8–12 December	Sachin Tendulkar	Hansie Cronje	Green Park Stadium, Kanpur	India by 280 runs
One-off ODI series
No.	Date	Home captain	Away captain	Venue	Result
ODI 1151	14 December	Sachin Tendulkar	Hansie Cronje	Wankhede Stadium, Mumbai	India by 74 runs

=== New Zealand in Pakistan ===
Test series
No.	Date	Home captain	Away captain	Venue	Result
Test 1339	21–24 November	Saeed Anwar	Lee Germon	Gaddafi Stadium, Lahore	New Zealand by 44 runs
Test 1342	28 November-1 December	Saeed Anwar	Lee Germon	Rawalpindi Cricket Stadium, Rawalpindi	Pakistan by an innings and 13 runs
ODI series
No.	Date	Home captain	Away captain	Venue	Result
ODI 1146	4 December	Wasim Akram	Lee Germon	Jinnah Stadium, Gujranwala	Pakistan by 11 runs
ODI 1148	6 December	Wasim Akram	Lee Germon	Jinnah Stadium, Sialkot	Pakistan by 46 runs
ODI 1150	8 December	Wasim Akram	Lee Germon	National Stadium, Karachi	New Zealand by 7 wickets

=== West Indies in Australia ===
Frank Worrell Trophy - Test series
No.	Date	Home captain	Away captain	Venue	Result
Test 1340	22–26 November	Mark Taylor	Courtney Walsh	The Gabba, Brisbane	Australia by 123 runs
Test 1343	29 November-3 December	Mark Taylor	Courtney Walsh	Sydney Cricket Ground, Sydney	Australia by 124 runs
Test 1346	26–28 December	Mark Taylor	Courtney Walsh	Melbourne Cricket Ground, Melbourne	West Indies by 6 wickets
Test 1352	25–28 January	Mark Taylor	Courtney Walsh	Adelaide Oval, Adelaide	Australia by an innings and 183 runs
Test 1353	1–3 February	Mark Taylor	Courtney Walsh	WACA Ground, Perth	West Indies by 10 wickets

== December ==
=== 1996–97 Carlton and United Series 1996-97 ===
Pos	Team	P	W	L	NR	T	Points	NRR
1	West Indies	8	5	3	0	0	10	−0.003
2	Pakistan	8	4	4	0	0	8	+0.109
3	Australia	8	3	5	0	0	6	−0.103

Group stage
No.	Date	Team 1	Captain 1	Team 2	Captain 2	Venue	Result
ODI 1147	6 December	Australia	Mark Taylor	West Indies	Courtney Walsh	Melbourne Cricket Ground, Melbourne	Australia by 5 wickets
ODI 1149	8 December	Australia	Mark Taylor	West Indies	Courtney Walsh	Sydney Cricket Ground, Sydney	Australia by 8 wickets
ODI 1152	15 December	Australia	Mark Taylor	Pakistan	Wasim Akram	Adelaide Oval, Adelaide	Pakistan by 12 runs
ODI 1154	17 December	Pakistan	Wasim Akram	West Indies	Courtney Walsh	Adelaide Oval, Adelaide	West Indies by 7 wickets
ODI 1155	1 January	Australia	Mark Taylor	Pakistan	Wasim Akram	Sydney Cricket Ground, Sydney	Pakistan by 4 wickets
ODI 1157	3 January	Pakistan	Wasim Akram	West Indies	Courtney Walsh	The Gabba, Brisbane	West Indies by 6 wickets
ODI 1159	5 January	Australia	Mark Taylor	West Indies	Courtney Walsh	The Gabba, Brisbane	West Indies by 7 wickets
ODI 1160	7 January	Australia	Mark Taylor	Pakistan	Wasim Akram	Bellerive Oval, Hobart	Pakistan by 29 runs
ODI 1161	10 January	Pakistan	Wasim Akram	West Indies	Courtney Walsh	WACA Ground, Perth	West Indies by 5 wickets
ODI 1162	12 January	Australia	Mark Taylor	West Indies	Courtney Walsh	WACA Ground, Perth	West Indies by 4 wickets
ODI 1163	14 January	Pakistan	Wasim Akram	West Indies	Carl Hooper	Sydney Cricket Ground, Sydney	Pakistan by 8 wickets
ODI 1164	16 January	Australia	Mark Taylor	Pakistan	Wasim Akram	Melbourne Cricket Ground, Melbourne	Australia by 3 wickets
Finals
No.	Date	Team 1	Captain 1	Team 2	Captain 2	Venue	Result
ODI 1165	18 January	Pakistan	Wasim Akram	West Indies	Carl Hooper	Sydney Cricket Ground, Sydney	Pakistan by 4 wickets
ODI 1166	20 January	Pakistan	Wasim Akram	West Indies	Courtney Walsh	Melbourne Cricket Ground, Melbourne	Pakistan by 62 runs

=== England in Zimbabwe ===
Test series
No.	Date	Home captain	Away captain	Venue	Result
Test 1345	17–21 December	Alistair Campbell	Mike Atherton	Queens Sports Club, Bulawayo	Match drawn
Test 1348	26–30 December	Alistair Campbell	Mike Atherton	Harare Sports Club, Harare	Match drawn
ODI series
No.	Date	Home captain	Away captain	Venue	Result
ODI 1153	15 December	Alistair Campbell	Mike Atherton	Queens Sports Club, Bulawayo	Zimbabwe by 2 wickets
ODI 1156	1 January	Alistair Campbell	Mike Atherton	Harare Sports Club, Harare	Zimbabwe by 7 runs
ODI 1158	3 January	Alistair Campbell	Mike Atherton	Harare Sports Club, Harare	Zimbabwe by 131 runs

=== India in South Africa ===
Test series
No.	Date	Home captain	Away captain	Venue	Result
Test 1347	26–28 December	Hansie Cronje	Sachin Tendulkar	Kingsmead Cricket Ground, Durban	South Africa by 328 runs
Test 1349	2–6 January	Hansie Cronje	Sachin Tendulkar	Newlands Cricket Ground, Durban	South Africa by 282 runs
Test 1350	16–20 January	Hansie Cronje	Sachin Tendulkar	The Wanderers Stadium, Johannesburg	Match drawn

== January ==
=== Standard Bank International One Day Series 1996-97 ===
Team	Pld	W	L	T	NR	Pts	NRR
South Africa	6	6	0	0	0	+0.393	12
India	6	1	4	1	0	−0.178	3
Zimbabwe	6	1	4	1	0	−0.233	3

Group stage
No.	Date	Team 1	Captain 1	Team 2	Captain 2	Venue	Result
ODI 1167	23 January	South Africa	Hansie Cronje	India	Sachin Tendulkar	Mangaung Oval, Bloemfontein	South Africa by 39 runs
ODI 1168	25 January	South Africa	Hansie Cronje	Zimbabwe	Alistair Campbell	SuperSport Park, Centurion	South Africa by 5 wickets
ODI 1169	27 January	India	Sachin Tendulkar	Zimbabwe	Alistair Campbell	Boland Park, Paarl	Match tied
ODI 1170	29 January	South Africa	Hansie Cronje	Zimbabwe	Alistair Campbell	Newlands Cricket Ground, Cape Town	South Africa by 5 wickets
ODI 1171	31 January	South Africa	Hansie Cronje	Zimbabwe	Alistair Campbell	The Wanderers Stadium, Johannesburg	South Africa by 4 wickets
ODI 1172	2 February	South Africa	Hansie Cronje	India	Sachin Tendulkar	St George's Park, Port Elizabeth	South Africa by 6 wickets
ODI 1173	4 February	South Africa	Hansie Cronje	India	Sachin Tendulkar	Buffalo Park, East London	South Africa by 6 wickets
ODI 1174	7 February	India	Sachin Tendulkar	Zimbabwe	Alistair Campbell	SuperSport Park, Centurion	Zimbabwe by 3 wickets
ODI 1175	9 February	India	Sachin Tendulkar	Zimbabwe	Alistair Campbell	Willowmoore Park, Benoni	India by 6 wickets
Finals
No.	Date	Team 1	Captain 1	Team 2	Captain 2	Venue	Result
ODI 1176	12 February	South Africa	Hansie Cronje	India	Sachin Tendulkar	Kingsmead Cricket Ground, Durban	No result
ODI 1177	13 February	South Africa	Hansie Cronje	India	Sachin Tendulkar	Kingsmead Cricket Ground, Durban	South Africa by 17 runs

=== England in New Zealand ===
Test series
No.	Date	Home captain	Away captain	Venue	Result
Test 1351	24–28 January	Lee Germon	Mike Atherton	Eden Park, Auckland	Match drawn
Test 1354	6–10 February	Lee Germon	Mike Atherton	Basin Reserve, Wellington	England by an innings and 68 runs
Test 1355	14–18 February	Stephen Fleming	Mike Atherton	AMI Stadium, Christchurch	England by 4 wickets
ODI series
No.	Date	Home captain	Away captain	Venue	Result
ODI 1179	20 February	Lee Germon	Mike Atherton	AMI Stadium, Christchurch	England by 4 wickets
ODI 1180	23 February	Lee Germon	Nasser Hussain	Eden Park, Auckland	England by 6 wickets
ODI 1181	26 February	Lee Germon	Mike Atherton	McLean Park, Napier	Match tied
ODI 1182	2 March	Lee Germon	Mike Atherton	Eden Park, Auckland	New Zealand by 9 runs
ODI 1183	4 March	Lee Germon	Mike Atherton	Basin Reserve, Wellington	New Zealand by 28 runs

== February ==
=== India in Zimbabwe ===
ODI series
No.	Date	Home captain	Away captain	Venue	Result
ODI 1178	15 February	Alistair Campbell	Sachin Tendulkar	Queens Sports Club, Bulawayo	Zimbabwe by 8 wickets
ODI 1178a	17 February	Alistair Campbell	Sachin Tendulkar	Harare Sports Club, Harare	Match cancelled

=== Australia in South Africa ===
Test series
No.	Date	Home captain	Away captain	Venue	Result
Test 1356	28 February-4 March	Hansie Cronje	Mark Taylor	The Wanderers Stadium, Johannesburg	Australia by an innings and 196 runs
Test 1360	14–17 March	Hansie Cronje	Mark Taylor	St George's Park, Port Elizabeth	Australia by 2 wickets
Test 1362	21–24 March	Hansie Cronje	Mark Taylor	SuperSport Park, Centurion	South Africa by 8 wickets
ODI series
No.	Date	Home captain	Away captain	Venue	Result
ODI 1186	29 March	Hansie Cronje	Mark Taylor	Buffalo Park, East London	South Africa by 6 wickets
ODI 1187	31 March	Hansie Cronje	Mark Taylor	St George's Park, Port Elizabeth	Australia by 7 wickets
ODI 1188	2 April	Hansie Cronje	Ian Healy	Newlands Cricket Ground, Cape Town	South Africa by 46 runs
ODI 1191	5 April	Hansie Cronje	Ian Healy	Kingsmead Cricket Ground, Durban	Australia by 15 runs
ODI 1195	8 April	Hansie Cronje	Ian Healy	The Wanderers Stadium, Johannesburg	Australia by 8 runs
ODI 1197	8 April	Hansie Cronje	Ian Healy	SuperSport Park, Centurion	Australia by 5 wickets
ODI 1199	13 April	Hansie Cronje	Steve Waugh	Mangaung Oval, Bloemfontein	South Africa by 109 runs

== March ==
=== India in the West Indies ===
Test series
No.	Date	Home captain	Away captain	Venue	Result
Test 1357	6–10 March	Courtney Walsh	Sachin Tendulkar	Sabina Park, Kingston	Match drawn
Test 1361	14–18 March	Courtney Walsh	Sachin Tendulkar	Queen's Park Oval, Port of Spain	Match drawn
Test 1363	27–31 March	Brian Lara	Sachin Tendulkar	Kensington Oval, Bridgetown	West Indies by 38 runs
Test 1364	4–8 April	Courtney Walsh	Sachin Tendulkar	Antigua Recreation Ground, St John's	Match drawn
Test 1365	17–21 April	Courtney Walsh	Sachin Tendulkar	Bourda, Georgetown	Match drawn
ODI series
No.	Date	Home captain	Away captain	Venue	Result
ODI 1200	26 April	Courtney Walsh	Sachin Tendulkar	Queen's Park Oval, Port of Spain	West Indies by 8 wickets
ODI 1201	27 April	Courtney Walsh	Sachin Tendulkar	Queen's Park Oval, Port of Spain	India by 10 wickets
ODI 1202	30 April	Courtney Walsh	Sachin Tendulkar	Arnos Vale Ground, Kingstown	West Indies by 18 runs
ODI 1203	3 May	Courtney Walsh	Sachin Tendulkar	Kensington Oval, Bridgetown	West Indies by 10 wickets

=== Sri Lanka in New Zealand ===
Test series
No.	Date	Home captain	Away captain	Venue	Result
Test 1358	7–10 March	Stephen Fleming	Arjuna Ranatunga	Carisbrook, Dunedin	New Zealand by an innings and 36 runs
Test 1359	14–17 March	Stephen Fleming	Arjuna Ranatunga	Seddon Park, Hamilton	New Zealand by 120 runs
ODI series
No.	Date	Home captain	Away captain	Venue	Result
ODI 1183a	22–23 March	Stephen Fleming	Arjuna Ranatunga	Eden Park, Auckland	Match abandoned
ODI 1184	25 March	Stephen Fleming	Arjuna Ranatunga	AMI Stadium, Christchurch	Sri Lanka by 6 wickets
ODI 1185	27 March	Stephen Fleming	Arjuna Ranatunga	Basin Reserve, Wellington	New Zealand by 69 runs

== April ==
=== Singer-Akai Cup 1996-97 ===
Team	P	W	L	T	NR	NRR	Points
Sri Lanka	4	3	1	0	0	+0.197	6
Pakistan	4	2	2	0	0	+0.275	4
Zimbabwe	4	1	3	0	0	-0.455	2

Group stage
No.	Date	Team 1	Captain 1	Team 2	Captain 2	Venue	Result
ODI 1189	3 April	Sri Lanka	Arjuna Ranatunga	Zimbabwe	Alistair Campbell	Sharjah Cricket Stadium, Sharjah	Sri Lanka by 7 wickets
ODI 1190	4 April	Pakistan	Wasim Akram	Sri Lanka	Arjuna Ranatunga	Sharjah Cricket Stadium, Sharjah	Sri Lanka by 19 runs
ODI 1192	6 April	Pakistan	Wasim Akram	Zimbabwe	Alistair Campbell	Sharjah Cricket Stadium, Sharjah	Pakistan by 93 runs
ODI 1193	7 April	Pakistan	Wasim Akram	Sri Lanka	Arjuna Ranatunga	Sharjah Cricket Stadium, Sharjah	Sri Lanka by 51 runs
ODI 1194	8 April	Sri Lanka	Arjuna Ranatunga	Zimbabwe	Alistair Campbell	Sharjah Cricket Stadium, Sharjah	Zimbabwe by 50 runs
ODI 1196	9 April	Pakistan	Wasim Akram	Zimbabwe	Alistair Campbell	Sharjah Cricket Stadium, Sharjah	Pakistan by 32 runs
Final
No.	Date	Team 1	Captain 1	Team 2	Captain 2	Venue	Result
ODI 1198	11 April	Pakistan	Wasim Akram	Sri Lanka	Arjuna Ranatunga	Sharjah Cricket Stadium, Sharjah	Sri Lanka by 4 wickets

=== Pakistan in Sri Lanka ===
Test series
No.	Date	Home captain	Away captain	Venue	Result
Test 1366	19–23 April	Arjuna Ranatunga	Rameez Raja	R. Premadasa Stadium, Colombo	Match drawn
Test 1367	26–30 April	Arjuna Ranatunga	Rameez Raja	Sinhalese Sports Club Ground, Colombo	Match drawn
