= International cricket in 1988–89 =

International cricket season

The 1988–89 international cricket season was from September 1988 to April 1989.

== Season overview ==
International tours
Start date	Home team	Away team	Results [Matches]			
Start date	Home team	Away team	Test	ODI	FC	LA
15 September 1988	Pakistan	Australia	1–0 [3]	1–0 [1]	—	—
12 November 1988	India	New Zealand	2–1 [3]	4–0 [4]	—	—
18 November 1988	Australia	West Indies	1–3 [5]	—	—	—
3 February 1989	New Zealand	Pakistan	0–0 [2]	4–1 [5]	—	—
7 March 1989	West Indies	India	3–0 [4]	5–0 [5]	—	—
International tournaments
Start date	Tournament				Winners	
16 October 1988	(United Arab Emirates) 1988-89 Champions Trophy				West Indies	
27 October 1988	(Bangladesh) 1988 Asia Cup				India	
10 December 1988	(Australia) 1988–89 Benson & Hedges World Series				West Indies	
23 March 1990	(United Arab Emirates) 1988-89 Sharjah Cup				Pakistan	

== September ==
=== Australia in Pakistan ===
Test series
No.	Date	Home captain	Away captain	Venue	Result
Test 1104	15–20 September	Javed Miandad	Allan Border	National Stadium, Karachi	Pakistan by an innings and 188 runs
Test 1105	23–28 September	Javed Miandad	Allan Border	Iqbal Stadium, Faisalabad	Match drawn
Test 1106	7–11 October	Javed Miandad	Allan Border	Gaddafi Stadium, Lahore	Match drawn
ODI series
No.	Date	Home captain	Away captain	Venue	Result
ODI 521a	30 September	Javed Miandad	Allan Border	Jinnah Stadium, Gujranwala	Match abandoned
ODI 521b	14 October	Javed Miandad	Allan Border	National Stadium, Karachi	Match abandoned
ODI 522	14 October	Javed Miandad	Allan Border	Gaddafi Stadium, Lahore	Pakistan won. (lost fewer wickets)

== October ==
=== 1988-89 Champions Trophy ===
Team	P	W	L	T	NR	RR	Points
Pakistan	2	2	0	0	0	5.4	8
India	2	1	1	0	0	4.5	4
West Indies	2	0	2	0	0	4.3	0

Group stage
No.	Date	Team 1	Captain 1	Team 2	Captain 2	Venue	Result
ODI 523	16 October	India	Dilip Vengsarkar	West Indies	Gordon Greenidge	Sharjah Cricket Stadium, Sharjah	India by 23 runs
ODI 524	18 October	Pakistan	Javed Miandad	West Indies	Gordon Greenidge	Sharjah Cricket Stadium, Sharjah	Pakistan by 84 runs
ODI 525	16 October	India	Dilip Vengsarkar	Pakistan	Javed Miandad	Sharjah Cricket Stadium, Sharjah	Pakistan by 34 runs
Semi-Final
No.	Date	Team 1	Captain 1	Team 2	Captain 2	Venue	Result
ODI 526	21 October	India	Dilip Vengsarkar	West Indies	Gordon Greenidge	Sharjah Cricket Stadium, Sharjah	West Indies by 8 wickets
Final
No.	Date	Team 1	Captain 1	Team 2	Captain 2	Venue	Result
ODI 527	22 October	Pakistan	Javed Miandad	West Indies	Gordon Greenidge	Sharjah Cricket Stadium, Sharjah	West Indies by 11 runs

=== 1988 Asia Cup ===
Teams	Pld	W	L	T	NR	Pts	RR
Sri Lanka	3	3	0	0	0	12	5.110
India	3	2	1	0	0	8	4.491
Pakistan	3	1	2	0	0	4	4.721
Bangladesh	3	0	3	0	0	0	2.430

Group stage
No.	Date	Team 1	Captain 1	Team 2	Captain 2	Venue	Result
ODI 528	27 October	Pakistan	Javed Miandad	Sri Lanka	Ranjan Madugalle	Bangabandhu National Stadium, Dhaka	Sri Lanka by 5 wickets
ODI 529	27 October	Bangladesh	Gazi Ashraf	India	Dilip Vengsarkar	MA Aziz Stadium, Chittagong	India by 9 wickets
ODI 530	29 October	India	Dilip Vengsarkar	Sri Lanka	Arjuna Ranatunga	Bangabandhu National Stadium, Dhaka	Sri Lanka by 17 runs
ODI 531	29 October	Bangladesh	Gazi Ashraf	Pakistan	Abdul Qadir	MA Aziz Stadium, Chittagong	Pakistan by 173 runs
ODI 532	31 October	India	Dilip Vengsarkar	Pakistan	Abdul Qadir	Bangabandhu National Stadium, Dhaka	India by 4 wickets
ODI 533	2 November	Bangladesh	Gazi Ashraf	Sri Lanka	Ravi Ratnayeke	Bangabandhu National Stadium, Dhaka	Sri Lanka by 9 wickets
Final
No.	Date	Team 1	Captain 1	Team 2	Captain 2	Venue	Result
ODI 534	4 November	India	Dilip Vengsarkar	Sri Lanka	Arjuna Ranatunga	Bangabandhu National Stadium, Dhaka	India by 6 wickets

== November ==
=== New Zealand in India ===
Test series
No.	Date	Home captain	Away captain	Venue	Result
Test 1107	12–17 November	Dilip Vengsarkar	John Wright	M Chinnaswamy Stadium, Bangalore	India by 172 runs
Test 1109	24–29 November	Dilip Vengsarkar	John Wright	Wankhede Stadium, Mumbai	New Zealand by 136 runs
Test 1111	2–6 December	Dilip Vengsarkar	John Wright	Lal Bahadur Shastri Stadium, Hyderabad	India by 10 wickets
ODI series
No.	Date	Home captain	Away captain	Venue	Result
ODI 536	10 December	Dilip Vengsarkar	John Wright	Indira Priyadarshini Stadium, Visakhapatnam	India by 4 wickets
ODI 538	12 December	Dilip Vengsarkar	John Wright	Barabati Stadium, Cuttack	India by 5 wickets
ODI 541	15 December	Dilip Vengsarkar	John Wright	Nehru Stadium, Indore	India by 53 runs
ODI 543	17 December	Dilip Vengsarkar	John Wright	Moti Bagh Stadium, Vadodara	India by 2 wickets

=== West Indies in Australia ===
Frank Worrell Trophy - Test series
No.	Date	Home captain	Away captain	Venue	Result
Test 1108	18–21 November	Allan Border	Vivian Richards	The Gabba, Brisbane	West Indies by 9 wickets
Test 1110	2–6 December	Allan Border	Vivian Richards	WACA Ground, Perth	West Indies by 169 runs
Test 1112	24–29 December	Allan Border	Vivian Richards	Melbourne Cricket Ground, Melbourne	West Indies by 285 runs
Test 1113	26–30 January	Allan Border	Vivian Richards	Sydney Cricket Ground, Sydney	Australia by 7 wickets
Test 1114	3–7 February	Allan Border	Vivian Richards	Adelaide Oval, Adelaide	Match drawn

== December ==
=== 1988–89 Benson & Hedges World Series ===
Group stage
No.	Date	Team 1	Captain 1	Team 2	Captain 2	Venue	Result
ODI 535	10 December	Pakistan	Imran Khan	West Indies	Vivian Richards	Adelaide Oval, Adelaide	West Indies by 89 runs
ODI 537	11 December	Australia	Allan Border	Pakistan	Imran Khan	Adelaide Oval, Adelaide	Australia by 9 wickets
ODI 539	13 December	Australia	Allan Border	West Indies	Vivian Richards	Sydney Cricket Ground, Sydney	West Indies by 1 run
ODI 540	15 December	Australia	Allan Border	West Indies	Vivian Richards	Melbourne Cricket Ground, Melbourne	West Indies by 34 runs
ODI 542	17 December	Pakistan	Imran Khan	West Indies	Vivian Richards	Bellerive Oval, Hobart	West Indies by 17 runs
ODI 544	1 January	Pakistan	Imran Khan	West Indies	Vivian Richards	WACA Ground, Perth	West Indies by 7 wickets
ODI 545	2 January	Australia	Allan Border	Pakistan	Imran Khan	WACA Ground, Perth	Pakistan by 38 runs
ODI 546	5 January	Australia	Allan Border	West Indies	Vivian Richards	Melbourne Cricket Ground, Melbourne	Australia by 8 runs
ODI 547	7 January	Pakistan	Imran Khan	West Indies	Vivian Richards	The Gabba, Brisbane	Pakistan by 55 runs
ODI 548	8 January	Australia	Allan Border	Pakistan	Imran Khan	The Gabba, Brisbane	Australia by 5 Wickets
ODI 549	10 January	Australia	Allan Border	Pakistan	Imran Khan	Melbourne Cricket Ground, Melbourne	Australia by 6 runs
ODI 550	12 January	Australia	Allan Border	West Indies	Vivian Richards	Sydney Cricket Ground, Sydney	Australia by 61 runs
Finals
No.	Date	Team 1	Captain 1	Team 2	Captain 2	Venue	Result
ODI 551	14 January	Australia	Allan Border	West Indies	Vivian Richards	Melbourne Cricket Ground, Melbourne	Australia by 2 runs
ODI 552	16 January	Australia	Allan Border	West Indies	Vivian Richards	Sydney Cricket Ground, Sydney	West Indies by 92 runs
ODI 553	18 January	Australia	Allan Border	West Indies	Vivian Richards	Sydney Cricket Ground, Sydney	West Indies by 8 wickets

== February ==
=== Pakistan in New Zealand ===
Test series
No.	Date	Home captain	Away captain	Venue	Result
Test 1113a	3–7 February	John Wright	Imran Khan	Carisbrook, Dunedin	Match abandoned
Test 1115	10–14 February	John Wright	Imran Khan	Basin Reserve, Wellington	Match drawn
Test 1116	24–28 February	John Wright	Imran Khan	Eden Park, Auckland	Match drawn
Dunedin Test Replacement ODI Match
No.	Date	Home captain	Away captain	Venue	Result
ODI 554	6 February	John Wright	Imran Khan	Carisbrook, Dunedin	New Zealand by 8 wickets
ODI series
No.	Date	Home captain	Away captain	Venue	Result
ODI 555	4 March	John Wright	Imran Khan	AMI Stadium, Christchurch	New Zealand by 3 wickets
ODI 557	8 March	John Wright	Imran Khan	Basin Reserve, Wellington	New Zealand by 6 wickets
ODI 559	11 March	John Wright	Imran Khan	Eden Park, Auckland	Pakistan by 7 wickets
ODI 561	14 March	John Wright	Imran Khan	Seddon Park, Hamilton	New Zealand by 7 wickets

== March ==
=== India in the West Indies ===
ODI series
No.	Date	Home captain	Away captain	Venue	Result
ODI 556	7 March	Vivian Richards	Dilip Vengsarkar	Kensington Oval, Bridgetown	West Indies by 50 runs
ODI 558	9 March	Vivian Richards	Dilip Vengsarkar	Queen's Park Oval, Port of Spain	West Indies by 6 wickets
ODI 560	11 March	Vivian Richards	Dilip Vengsarkar	Queen's Park Oval, Port of Spain	West Indies by 6 wickets
ODI 562	18 March	Vivian Richards	Dilip Vengsarkar	Antigua Recreation Ground, St John's	West Indies by 8 wickets
ODI 563	21 March	Vivian Richards	Dilip Vengsarkar	Bourda, Georgetown	West Indies by 101 runs
Test series
No.	Date	Home captain	Away captain	Venue	Result
Test 1117	25–30 March	Vivian Richards	Dilip Vengsarkar	Bourda, Georgetown	Match drawn
Test 1118	7–12 April	Vivian Richards	Dilip Vengsarkar	Kensington Oval, Bridgetown	West Indies by 8 wickets
Test 1119	16–20 April	Vivian Richards	Dilip Vengsarkar	Queen's Park Oval, Port of Spain	West Indies by 217 runs
Test 1120	28 April-3 May	Vivian Richards	Dilip Vengsarkar	Sabina Park, Kingston	West Indies by 7 wickets

=== 1989 Sharjah Cup ===
Two-match series
No.	Date	Team 1	Captain 1	Team 2	Captain 2	Venue	Result
ODI 564	23 March	Pakistan	Imran Khan	Sri Lanka	Arjuna Ranatunga	Sharjah Cricket Stadium, Sharjah	Pakistan by 30 runs
ODI 565	24 March	Pakistan	Imran Khan	Sri Lanka	Arjuna Ranatunga	Sharjah Cricket Stadium, Sharjah	Pakistan by 7 wickets
