= 1985–86 Sharjah Cup =

International cricket tournament

1985 Rothmans Sharjah Cup
- Cricket format: One Day International
- Tournament format(s): Round-robin
- Host(s): United Arab Emirates
- Champions: West Indies
- Runners-up: Pakistan
- Participants: 3
- Matches: 3
- Player of the series: (Cricket West Indies) RB Richardson
- Most runs: (Cricket West Indies) RB Richardson (171)
- Most wickets: (Pakistan) Mudassar Nazar (3) (Pakistan) Tauseef Ahmed (3) (Cricket West Indies) J Garner (3)

The 1985 Rothmans Sharjah Cup was held in Sharjah, UAE, between November 15–22, 1985. Three national teams took part: India, Pakistan and West Indies.

The 1985 Rothmans Sharjah Cup was a round-robin tournament where each team played the other once. West Indies won both its matches, winning the Rothmans Cup and US$50,000. Pakistan came second while India lost both its matches. Player of the Series Richie Richardson won US$3,000 and a car.

== Matches ==
=== Table ===
Team	P	W	L	T	NR	RR	Points
West Indies	2	2	0	0	0	4.494	4
Pakistan	2	1	1	0	0	4.433	2
India	2	0	2	0	0	3.911	0

15 November 1985
Scorecard

Pakistan; 196/4 (45 overs)	v	West Indies; 199/3 (44.1 overs)
Mohsin Khan 86* (126); MA Holding 1/17 (5 overs)		RB Richardson 99* (141); Mudassar Nazar 1/32 (9 overs)

West Indies won by 7 wickets
Sharjah Cricket Stadium, Sharjah, UAE
Umpires: HD Bird (ENG) and DR Shepherd (ENG)
Player of the match: RB Richardson (WIN)

- Pakistan won the toss and elected to bat.
- AH Gray (WIN) made his ODI debut.

17 November 1985
Scorecard

Pakistan; 203/4 (45 overs)	v	India; 155 (40.4 overs)
Mudassar Nazar 67 (117); RMH Binny 1/36 (9 overs)		SM Gavaskar 63 (105); Tauseef Ahmed 3/30 (9 overs)

Pakistan won by 48 runs
Sharjah Cricket Stadium, Sharjah, UAE
Umpires: HD Bird (ENG) and DR Shepherd (ENG)
Player of the match: Mudassar Nazar (PAK)

- India won the toss and elected to field.

22 November 1985
Scorecard

India; 180/4 (45 overs)	v	West Indies; 186/2 (41.3 overs)
SM Gavaskar 76* (128); J Garner 2/11 (9 overs)		DL Haynes 72* (105); Kapil Dev 1/29 (8 overs)

West Indies won by 8 wickets
Sharjah Cricket Stadium, Sharjah, UAE
Umpires: HD Bird (ENG) and DR Shepherd (ENG)
Player of the match: J Garner (WIN)

- India won the toss and elected to bat.

== See also ==
- Sharjah Cup
