= 1984–85 Four-Nations Cup =

International cricket tournament

1985 Rothmans Four-Nations Cup
- Cricket format: One Day International
- Tournament format(s): Knock-out
- Host(s): United Arab Emirates
- Champions: India (1st title)
- Runners-up: Australia
- Participants: 4
- Matches: 4
- Player of the series: (India) SM Gavaskar
- Most runs: (Pakistan) Javed Miandad (71)
- Most wickets: (Pakistan) Imran Khan (7)

The 1985 Rothmans Four-Nations Cup was held in Sharjah, UAE, between March 22–29, 1985. Four national teams took part: Australia, England, India and Pakistan.

The 1985 Rothmans Four-Nations Cup was a knock-out tournament. India won the tournament, defeating Australia in the final, and won US$45,000. Pakistan beat England in the Plate Final to take third place.

== Matches ==
Semi-finals
22 March
India	125
Pakistan	87
24 March
England	177/8
Australia	178/8

Final
29 March
Australia	139
India	140/7
Third place
26 March
Pakistan	175/7
England	132

=== Semi-finals ===
22 March 1985
Scorecard

India; 125 (42.4 overs)	v	Pakistan; 87 (32.5 overs)
M Azharuddin 47 (93); Imran Khan 6/14 (10 overs)		Rameez Raja 29 (71); Kapil Dev 3/17 (6.5 overs)

India won by 38 runs
Sharjah Cricket Stadium, Sharjah, UAE
Umpires: HD Bird (ENG) and MW Johnson (AUS)
Player of the match: Imran Khan (PAK)

- Pakistan won the toss and elected to field.

24 March 1985
Scorecard

England; 177/8 (50 overs)	v	Australia; 178/8 (50 overs)
RT Robinson 37 (73); AR Border 3/21 (7 overs)		GM Wood 35 (50); PH Edmonds 2/31 (10 overs)

Australia won by 2 wickets
Sharjah Cricket Stadium, Sharjah, UAE
Umpires: Khizer Hayat (PAK) and S Kishen (IND)
Player of the match: GRJ Matthews (AUS)

- Australia won the toss and elected to field.
- N Gifford and CM Wells (both ENG) made their ODI debuts.

=== Plate Final (third place play-off) ===
26 March 1985
Scorecard

Pakistan; 175/7 (50 overs)	v	England; 132 (48.2 overs)
Javed Miandad 71 (117); N Gifford 4/23 (10 overs)		RJ Bailey 41* (83); Shoaib Mohammad 3/20 (10 overs)

Pakistan won by 43 runs
Sharjah Cricket Stadium, Sharjah, UAE
Umpires: MW Johnson (AUS) and S Kishen (IND)
Player of the match: Javed Miandad (PAK)

- England won the toss and elected to field.
- RJ Bailey and PI Pocock (both ENG) made their ODI debuts.

=== Final ===
29 March 1985
Scorecard

Australia; 139 (42.3 overs)	v	India; 140/7 (39.2 overs)
KC Wessels 30 (68); RJ Shastri 2/14 (9.3 overs)		DB Vengsarkar 35 (43); CJ McDermott 3/36 (10 overs)

India won by 3 wickets
Sharjah Cricket Stadium, Sharjah, UAE
Umpires: HD Bird (ENG) and Khizer Hayat (PAK)
Player of the match: M Amarnath (IND)

- India won the toss and elected to field.

== See also ==
- Sharjah Cup
