= 1986–87 Champions Trophy =

International cricket tournament

1986 Champions Trophy
- Cricket format: One Day International
- Tournament format: Round-robin
- Host: United Arab Emirates
- Champions: West Indies
- Runners-up: Pakistan
- Participants: 4
- Matches: 6
- Player of the series: (Cricket West Indies) CA Walsh
- Most runs: (Cricket West Indies) CG Greenidge (141)
- Most wickets: (Cricket West Indies) CA Walsh (10)

The 1986 Champions Trophy was a cricket tournament held in Sharjah, UAE, between November 27 and December 5, 1986. Four national teams took part: India, Pakistan, Sri Lanka and West Indies.

The 1986 Champions Trophy was a round-robin tournament where each team played the other once in a tournament worth £60,000 in prize money. West Indies won all three of its matches, winning the trophy and UK£22,000.

== Points Table ==
Team	P	W	L	T	NR	RR	Points
West Indies	3	3	0	0	0	4.792	12
Pakistan	3	2	1	0	0	3.419	8
India	3	1	2	0	0	3.985	4
Sri Lanka	3	0	3	0	0	3.207	0

Source: ESPNcricinfo

== Matches ==
27 November 1986
Scorecard

Sri Lanka; 214/9 (45 overs)	v	India; 215/3 (41.3 overs)
A Ranatunga 39 (44); C Sharma 3/40 (8 overs)		K Srikkanth 92 (89); GF Labrooy 2/32 (8 overs)

India won by 7 wickets
Sharjah Cricket Stadium, Sharjah, UAE
Umpires: HD Bird (ENG) and DR Shepherd (ENG)
Player of the match: K Srikkanth (IND)

- India won the toss and elected to field.
- GF Labrooy and HP Tillakaratne (SL) made their ODI debuts.

28 November 1986
Scorecard

Pakistan; 143 (43.4 overs)	v	West Indies; 145/1 (33.2 overs)
Rameez Raja 44 (93); CA Walsh 4/31 (9.4 overs)		CG Greenidge 74 (102); Manzoor Elahi 1/20 (3.2 overs)

West Indies won by 9 wickets
Sharjah Cricket Stadium, Sharjah, UAE
Umpires: HD Bird (ENG) and DR Shepherd (ENG)
Player of the match: AL Logie (WIN)

- Pakistan won the toss and elected to bat.
- An umpiring oversight allowed Courtney Walsh an illegal tenth over.

30 November 1986
Scorecard

West Indies; 198/8 (45 overs)	v	India; 165/8 (45 overs)
IVA Richards 62 (58); M Azharuddin 2/41 (9 overs)		SM Gavaskar 63 (107); AH Gray 3/32 (9 overs)

West Indies won by 33 runs
Sharjah Cricket Stadium, Sharjah, UAE
Umpires: HD Bird (ENG) and DR Shepherd (ENG)
Player of the match: IVA Richards (WIN)

- India won the toss and elected to field.

2 December 1986
Scorecard

Sri Lanka; 164/7 (45 overs)	v	Pakistan; 165/6 (44 overs)
AP Gurunsinha 60 (97); Mudassar Nazar 1/16 (6 overs)		Rameez Raja 39 (70); A Ranatunga 1/14 (3 overs)

Pakistan won by 4 wickets
Sharjah Cricket Stadium, Sharjah, UAE
Umpires: HD Bird (ENG) and DR Shepherd (ENG)
Player of the match: AP Gurusinha (SL)

- Pakistan won the toss and elected to field.

3 December 1986
Scorecard

West Indies; 248/5 (45 overs)	v	Sri Lanka; 55 (28.3 overs)
RB Richardson 109 (120); JR Ratnayeke 3/59 (9 overs)		AP Gurusinha 15 (35); CA Walsh 5/1 (4.3 overs)

West Indies won by 193 runs
Sharjah Cricket Stadium, Sharjah, UAE
Umpires: HD Bird (ENG) and DR Shepherd (ENG)
Player of the match: CA Walsh (WIN)

- Sri Lanka won the toss and elected to field.

5 December 1986
Scorecard

India; 144 (40.2 overs)	v	Pakistan; 145/7 (43.3 overs)
M Azharuddin 49 (86); Imran Khan 3/27 (8 overs)		Manzoor Elahi 50* (54); Maninder Singh 4/22 (9 overs)

Pakistan won by 3 wickets
Sharjah Cricket Stadium, Sharjah, UAE
Umpires: HD Bird (ENG) and DR Shepherd (ENG)
Player of the match: Manzoor Elahi (PAK)

- Pakistan won the toss and elected to field.

== See also ==
- Sharjah Cup
