= 1995–96 Singer Champions Trophy =

International cricket tournament

1995 Singer Champions Trophy
- Cricket format: One Day International
- Host: United Arab Emirates
- Champions: Sri Lanka
- Runners-up: West Indies
- Participants: 3
- Matches: 7
- Player of the series: (Sri Lanka) RS Mahanama
- Most runs: (Sri Lanka) RS Mahanama (288)
- Most wickets: (Sri Lanka) HDPK Dharmasena (11)

The 1995 Singer Champions Trophy was a cricket tournament held in Sharjah, UAE, between October 11–20, 1995. Three national teams took part: Pakistan, Sri Lanka and West Indies.

The 1995 Champions Trophy started with a double round-robin tournament where each team played the other twice. The two leading teams qualified for the final. Sri Lanka won the tournament and US$30,000.

== Matches ==
=== Group stage ===
Team	P	W	L	T	NR	RR	Points
West Indies	4	2	2	0	0	5.196	4
Sri Lanka	4	2	2	0	0	5.056	4
Pakistan	4	2	2	0	0	4.215	4

11 October 1995
Scorecard

Sri Lanka; 234/7 (50 overs)	v	West Indies; 228/9 (50 overs)
RS Mahanama 101 (153); IR Bishop 3/42 (10 overs)		SL Campbell 86 (119); HDPK Dharmasena 3/49 (9 overs)

Sri Lanka won by 6 runs
Sharjah Cricket Stadium, Sharjah, UAE
Umpires: RS Dunne (NZ) and DB Hair (AUS)
Player of the match: RS Mahanama (SL)

- West Indies won the toss and elected to field.
- HAG Anthony and CO Browne (both WI) made their ODI debuts.

12 October 1995
Scorecard

Pakistan; 264/7 (50 overs)	v	Sri Lanka; 182/8 (50 overs)
Aamer Sohail 85 (110); HDPK Dharmasena 2/43 (10 overs)		HDPK Dharmasena 30* (64); Aamer Sohail 4/22 (8 overs)

Pakistan won by 82 runs
Sharjah Cricket Stadium, Sharjah, UAE
Umpires: RS Dunne (NZ) and NT Plews (ENG)
Player of the match: Aamer Sohail (PAK)

- Pakistan won the toss and elected to bat.

13 October 1995
Scorecard

Pakistan; 242/4 (50 overs)	v	West Indies; 227 (49 overs)
Rameez Raja 104* (134); AC Cummins 2/31 (10 overs)		RA Harper 43* (57); Saqlain Mushtaq 4/47 (10 overs)

Pakistan won by 15 runs
Sharjah Cricket Stadium, Sharjah, UAE
Umpires: DB Hair (AUS) and NT Plews (ENG)
Player of the match: Rameez Raja (PAK)

- Pakistan won the toss and elected to bat.

15 October 1995
Scorecard

Pakistan; 194/9 (50 overs)	v	West Indies; 195/6 (39.1 overs)
Saleem Elahi 66 (109); OD Gibson 2/47 (9 overs)		SC Williams 57 (63); Mohammad Akram 2/36 (7 overs)

West Indies won by 4 wickets
Sharjah Cricket Stadium, Sharjah, UAE
Umpires: RS Dunne (NZ) and DB Hair (AUS)
Player of the match: SC Williams (WI)

- West Indies won the toss and elected to field.

16 October 1995
Scorecard

West Indies; 333/7 (50 overs)	v	Sri Lanka; 329 (49.3 overs)
BC Lara 169 (129); GP Wickramasinghe 2/58 (10 overs)		HP Tillakaratne 100 (106); AC Cummins 2/61 (9.3 overs)

West Indies won by 4 runs
Sharjah Cricket Stadium, Sharjah, UAE
Umpires: RS Dunne (NZ) and NT Plews (ENG)
Player of the match: BC Lara (WI)

- West Indies won the toss and elected to bat.

17 October 1995
Scorecard

Pakistan; 143 (48.3 overs)	v	Sri Lanka; 149/2 (26.5 overs)
Saqlain Mushtaq 30 (52); HDPK Dharmasena 3/16 (10 overs)		RS Mahanama 45* (73); Mohammad Akram 1/24 (5 overs)

Sri Lanka won by 8 wickets
Sharjah Cricket Stadium, Sharjah, UAE
Umpires: DB Hair (AUS) and NT Plews (ENG)
Player of the match: A Ranatunga (SL)

- Pakistan won the toss and elected to bat.

=== Final ===
20 October 1995
Scorecard

Sri Lanka; 273 (49.5 overs)	v	West Indies; 223 (47.3 overs)
RS Mahanama 66 (103); OD Gibson 4/35 (5.5 overs)		SL Campbell 38 (78); M Muralitharan 3/31 (10 overs)

Sri Lanka won by 50 runs
Sharjah Cricket Stadium, Sharjah, UAE
Umpires: RS Dunne (NZ) and DB Hair (AUS)
Player of the match: PA de Silva (SL)

- West Indies won the toss and elected to field.

== See also ==
- Sharjah Cup
