= 1996–97 Singer Champions Trophy =

International cricket tournament

1996 Singer Champions Trophy
- Cricket format: One Day International
- Host: United Arab Emirates
- Champions: Pakistan
- Runners-up: New Zealand
- Participants: 3
- Matches: 7
- Player of the series: (Pakistan) Waqar Younis
- Most runs: (Pakistan) Saeed Anwar (278)
- Most wickets: (Pakistan) Waqar Younis (13)

The 1996 Singer Champions Trophy was a cricket tournament held in Sharjah, UAE, between November 7-15, 1996. Three national teams took part: New Zealand, Pakistan, and Sri Lanka.

The 1996 Champions Trophy started with a double round-robin tournament where each team played the other twice. The two leading teams qualified for the final. Pakistan won the tournament and a prize of US$30,000. Runners-up New Zealand won US$15,000.

The beneficiaries of the tournament were Talat Ali, Sadiq Mohammad and Ijaz Ahmed (all Pakistan) who each received US$35,000.

== Matches ==
=== Group stage ===
Team	P	W	L	T	NR	NRR	Points
Pakistan	4	3	1	0	0	-0.174	6
New Zealand	4	1	2	1	0	0.025	3
Sri Lanka	4	1	2	1	0	0.151	3

7 November 1996
Scorecard

New Zealand; 206/8 (50 overs)	v	Sri Lanka; 177 (49.1 overs)
CL Cairns 71 (91); WPUJC Vaas 4/22 (9 overs)		PA de Silva 47 (74); DK Morrison 2/28 (9 overs); CZ Harris 2/28 (8 overs)

New Zealand won by 29 runs
Sharjah Cricket Stadium, Sharjah, UAE
Umpires: ID Robinson (ZIM) and G Sharp (ENG)
Player of the match: CL Cairns (NZ)

- Sri Lanka won the toss and elected to field.

8 November 1996
Scorecard

Sri Lanka; 206 (49.3 overs)	v	Pakistan; 131 (36 overs)
RS Mahanama 37 (54); Wasim Akram 4/42 (10 overs)		Ijaz Ahmed 49 (58); ST Jayasuriya 3/15 (5 overs)

Sri Lanka won by 75 runs
Sharjah Cricket Stadium, Sharjah, UAE
Umpires: SK Bansal (IND) and G Sharp (ENG)
Player of the match: ST Jayasuriya (SL)

- Pakistan won the toss and elected to field.
- This was Asanka Gurusinha's Last ODI match

10 November 1996
Scorecard

New Zealand; 197 (50 overs)	v	Pakistan; 198/6 (46.3 overs)
AC Parore 93 (155); Saqlain Mushtaq 3/31 (10 overs)		Saeed Anwar 104* (132); NJ Astle 2/25 (9 overs)

Pakistan won by 4 wickets
Sharjah Cricket Stadium, Sharjah, UAE
Umpires: SK Bansal (IND) and ID Robinson (ZIM)
Player of the match: Saeed Anwar (PAK)

- New Zealand won the toss and elected to bat.

11 November 1996
Scorecard

New Zealand; 169/8 (50 overs)	v	Sri Lanka; 169 (48 overs)
NJ Astle 66 (130); KSC de Silva 3/18 (8 overs)		ST Jayasuriya 53 (64); DK Morrison 5/34 (10 overs)

Match tied
Sharjah Cricket Stadium, Sharjah, UAE
Umpires: ID Robinson (ZIM) and G Sharp (ENG)
Player of the match: DK Morrison (NZ)

- New Zealand won the toss and elected to bat.

12 November 1996
Scorecard

Sri Lanka; 189 (50 overs)	v	Pakistan; 193/2 (46.4 overs)
MS Atapattu 58 (100); Waqar Younis 3/28 (10 overs)		Saeed Anwar 112* (125); ST Jayasuriya 1/35 (9 overs)

Pakistan won by 8 wickets
Sharjah Cricket Stadium, Sharjah, UAE
Umpires: SK Bansal (IND) and G Sharp (ENG)
Player of the match: Saeed Anwar (PAK)

- Sri Lanka won the toss and elected to bat.

13 November 1996
Scorecard

New Zealand; 192 (50 overs)	v	Pakistan; 196/6 (48.3 overs)
AC Parore 78 (123); Waqar Younis 6/44 (10 overs)		Saeed Anwar 54 (37); CL Cairns 3/18 (10 overs)

Pakistan won by 4 wickets
Sharjah Cricket Stadium, Sharjah, UAE
Umpires: SK Bansal (IND) and ID Robinson (ZIM)
Player of the match: Waqar Younis (PAK)

- Pakistan won the toss and elected to field.

=== Final ===
New Zealand qualified for the final because they had taken more points than Sri Lanka in their head-to-head games.

15 November 1996
Scorecard

Pakistan; 160 (48.5 overs)	v	New Zealand; 119 (36.5 overs)
Saleem Malik 40 (58); CL Cairns 2/24 (9.5 overs)		MJ Greatbatch 52 (80); Wasim Akram 3/20 (8 overs)

Pakistan won by41 runs
Sharjah Cricket Stadium, Sharjah, UAE
Umpires: SK Bansal (IND) and G Sharp (ENG)
Player of the match: Wasim Akram (PAK)

- New Zealand won the toss and elected to field.

== See also ==
- Sharjah Cup
