= Norman Gifford =

English cricketer (1940–2026)

Norman Gifford MBE
Personal information
- Full name: Norman Gifford
- Born: 30 March 1940; Ulverston, Lancashire, England
- Died: 19 January 2026 (aged 85)
- Batting: Left-handed
- Bowling: Slow left-arm orthodox

International information
- National side: England
- Test debut (cap 423): 18 June 1964 v Australia
- Last Test: 21 June 1973 v New Zealand
- ODI debut (cap 81): 24 March 1985 v Australia
- Last ODI: 26 March 1985 v Pakistan

Domestic team information
- Years: Team
- 1960–1982: Worcestershire
- 1983–1988: Warwickshire

Career statistics
Competition	Test	ODI	FC	LA
Matches	15	2	710	397
Runs scored	179	0	7,048	1,478
Batting average	16.27	0.00	13.00	11.11
100s/50s	0/0	0/0	0/3	0/0
Top score	25*	0	89	38
Balls bowled	3,084	120	128,412	17,601
Wickets	33	4	2,068	443
Bowling average	31.09	12.50	23.56	26.01
5 wickets in innings	1	0	93	5
10 wickets in match	0	0	14	0
Best bowling	5/55	4/23	8/28	6/8
Catches/stumpings	8/–	1/–	319/–	96/–
- Source: ESPNcricinfo, 29 May 2017

Norman Gifford MBE (30 March 1940 – 19 January 2026) was an English cricketer, who played primarily as a left-arm spinner. Gifford played county cricket for Worcestershire, and Warwickshire County Cricket Clubs, and represented England in fifteen Test matches and two One Day International between 1964 and 1985.

Cricket writer Colin Bateman said, "a spinner who pushed Derek Underwood out of the England side had to be something special, and Norman Gifford was just that. A great competitor with a deep knowledge of the game, 'Giff' could find turn from most surfaces despite firing in his left-arm deliveries".

== Early career ==
Gifford was born on 30 March 1940. Known to Worcestershire folk as "Apple Norm", Gifford served his apprenticeship as a professional cricketer in the Worcestershire second team during 1959, and when in May 1960 he took 2–25 from 18 overs in a drawn Second XI match against Kent, he was called up to the first team for the game against the same opposition that began the very next day. Gifford took four wickets in Kent's first innings, but Worcestershire collapsed to their second-lowest ever score of 25 all out on their way to an innings defeat. In the next game against Cambridge University Gifford took ten wickets in the match, including second-innings analysis of 15.5–7–18–6.

== Recognition ==
Gifford finished 1960 with 41 wickets at an average of 17.90, but this only hinted at the success he was to enjoy the following year. 1961 proved to be the most productive season of Gifford's career as he took 133 wickets. In July 1961, he was notified he was on the long list to tour India and Pakistan with the Marylebone Cricket Club (MCC) side, but was not selected for the final party. In compensation he toured Rhodesia and Pakistan with an International XI. He was again fairly successful in the 1962 and 1963 seasons, with 92 and 72 wickets respectively, and in 1962 was selected for the Players in their penultimate match against the Gentlemen before the distinction between amateur and professional cricketers was abolished.

== International selection ==
1964 was the year when Gifford really broke through as he was selected for the Second Ashes Test at Lord's in June. Although the game was ruined by rain, with no play at all possible on the first two days, Gifford had time to impress, returning miserly analyses of 12–6–14–2 in the first innings and 17–9–17–1 in the second. He was retained for the Third Test at Headingley, but took only two wickets as Australia recorded a comfortable win. It would be seven years before he played Test cricket again.

== County cricketer ==
Worcestershire won the County Championship in 1964, and retained their title the following year. Gifford was instrumental in these successes, and although he reached 100 wickets only in 1964, between 1963 and 1968 he averaged under 20 with the ball every season. He took his career-best bowling figures in July 1968 when he took 8–28 (albeit in a losing cause) against Yorkshire.

== International recall ==
Gifford was recalled to the England team in 1971, replacing Derek Underwood for the Second Test against Pakistan. He was in and out of the team during the next two years, including a tour of the Indian sub-continent in 1972–3.

He played two more Tests against New Zealand the following summer, but thereafter the selectors' minds turned decisively towards Underwood and Gifford never played Test cricket again. He contented himself with consistent displays in county cricket, leading Worcestershire to another County Championship triumph in 1974, for which he was named as a Wisden Cricketer of the Year. Later he played for Worcestershire's great rivals Warwickshire, whom he joined for the 1983 season. That year he took 104 first-class wickets, the final time he was to reach the 100 mark.

== One Day captain ==
Gifford's England career, however, was not quite over. He made his One Day International debut – extraordinarily as captain – in the absence of David Gower who was being rested, at the age of 44 in the 1984/85 Rothmans Four-Nations Cup contest in Sharjah. England lost both their matches, against Australia and Pakistan, but Gifford showed that he still had the ability in the second game when he took 4–23 including the prize wicket of Imran Khan for a first-ball duck. Despite this performance, however, these two games proved to be the extent of Gifford's brief ODI career.

== Later life and death ==
Gifford continued to play for Warwickshire into his late forties, and when he retired from playing at the age of 48 in 1988, he had taken 2,068 first-class wickets. The reduction in the amount of first-class cricket played means that he is likely to remain the last man to reach the 2,000 mark. Never much of a batsman, he made only three half-centuries in more than 800 innings, his 7,000 runs coming at an average of just 13. After retirement, Gifford went into coaching and became coach of first Sussex, and then Durham.

Gifford died from complications of lung disease and pulmonary fibrosis on 19 January 2026, aged 85.

== Career highlights ==
=== Tests ===
- Test debut: vs Australia, Lord's, 1964
- Last Test: vs New Zealand, Lord's, 1973
  - Highest score: 25* vs New Zealand, Nottingham, 1973
  - Best bowling: 5–55 vs Pakistan, Karachi, 1972/73

=== One-Day International ===
- ODI debut: vs Australia, Sharjah, 1984/85
- Last ODI: vs Pakistan, Sharjah, 1984/85
  - Highest score: 0 vs Pakistan, Sharjah 1984/85
  - Best bowling: 4–23 vs Pakistan, Sharjah 1984/85
  - ODI captaincy record: 2 matches; 0 wins, 2 losses

=== First-class ===
- First-class debut: Worcestershire vs Kent, Tunbridge Wells, 1960
- Last first-class match: Warwickshire vs Somerset, Birmingham, 1988
  - Highest score: 89 for Worcestershire vs Oxford University, Oxford, 1963
  - Best bowling: 8–28 for Worcestershire vs Yorkshire, Sheffield, 1968

=== List A Limited Overs ===
- List A debut: Worcestershire vs Sussex, Lord's, 1963
- Last List A match: Warwickshire vs Cambridgeshire, Birmingham, 1988
  - Highest score: 38 for Worcestershire vs Warwickshire, Lord's, 1966 (Gillette Cup final)
  - Best bowling: 6–8 for Worcestershire vs Minor Counties South, High Wycombe, 1979

== Honours ==
Gifford was appointed a Member of the Order of the British Empire (MBE) in the 1978 Birthday Honours for services to Cricket.

Sporting positions
Preceded by Tom Graveney	Worcestershire County Cricket Captain; 1971–1980	Succeeded by Glenn Turner
