= 1986–87 Sharjah Cup =

International cricket tournament

1987 Sharjah Cup
- Cricket format: One Day International
- Tournament format(s): Round-robin
- Host(s): United Arab Emirates
- Champions: England
- Runners-up: Pakistan
- Participants: 4
- Matches: 6
- Player of the series: (Australia) DC Boon
- Most runs: (Australia) DC Boon (206)
- Most wickets: (England) JE Emburey (6)

The 1987 Sharjah Cup was held in Sharjah, UAE, between April 2–10, 1987. Four national teams took part: Australia, England, India and Pakistan.

The 1987 Sharjah Cup was a round-robin tournament where each team played the other once.

England won the tournament and UK£18,750 in prize money.

== Matches ==
=== Table ===
Team	P	W	L	T	NR	RR	Points
England	3	2	1	0	0	4.46	4
Pakistan	3	2	1	0	0	4.17	4
India	3	2	1	0	0	4.07	4
Australia	3	0	3	0	0	3.80	0

2 April 1987
Scorecard

England; 211/7 (50 overs)	v	India; 214/7 (48.5 overs)
BC Broad 57 (94); RJ Shastri 3/47 (10 overs)		Kapil Dev 64 (54); JE Emburey 3/38 (9.5 overs)

India won by 3 wickets
Sharjah Cricket Stadium, Sharjah, UAE
Umpires: DP Buultjens (SL) and PW Vidanagamage (SL)
Player of the match: Kapil Dev (IND)

- India won the toss and elected to field.
- DJ Capel, NH Fairbrother and JJ Whitaker (all ENG) made their ODI debuts.

3 April 1987
Scorecard

Australia; 176/9 (50 overs)	v	Pakistan; 180/4 (46.4 overs)
DC Boon 71 (132); Mudassar Nazar 3/44 (10 overs)		Javed Miandad 74* (97); SP Davis 1/26 (10 overs); BA Reid 1/26 (8.4 overs)

Pakistan won by 6 wickets
Sharjah Cricket Stadium, Sharjah, UAE
Umpires: DP Buultjens (SL) and PW Vidanagamage (SL)
Player of the match: Mudassar Nazar (PAK)

- Pakistan won the toss and elected to field.
- MRJ Veletta (AUS) made his ODI debut.

5 April 1987
Scorecard

Australia; 176/6 (50 overs)	v	India; 177/3 (42 overs)
DC Boon 62 (113); Maninder Singh 2/26 (9 overs)		M Azharuddin 84 (129); SR Waugh 1/33 (8 overs)

India won by 7 wickets
Sharjah Cricket Stadium, Sharjah, UAE
Umpires: DP Buultjens (SL) and PW Vidanagamage (SL)
Player of the match: M Azharuddin (IND)

- India won the toss and elected to field.

7 April 1987
Scorecard

Pakistan; 217/9 (50 overs)	v	England; 220/5 (47.2 overs)
Javed Miandad 60 (101); DJ Capel 3/38 (10 overs)		RT Robinson 83 (104); Abdul Qadir 3/47 (10 overs)

England won by 5 wickets
Sharjah Cricket Stadium, Sharjah, UAE
Umpires: DP Buultjens (SL) and PW Vidanagamage (SL)
Player of the match: RT Robinson (ENG)

- England won the toss and elected to field.

9 April 1987
Scorecard

England; 230/6 (50 overs)	v	Australia; 219/8 (50 overs)
GA Gooch 86 (119); SP O'Donnell 1/27 (8 overs)		AR Border 84 (104); JE Emburey 2/38 (10 overs)

England won by 11 runs
Sharjah Cricket Stadium, Sharjah, UAE
Umpires: DP Buultjens (SL) and PW Vidanagamage (SL)
Player of the match: GA Gooch (ENG)

- Australia won the toss and elected to field.

10 April 1987
Scorecard

India; 183/8 (50 overs)	v	Pakistan; 184/2 (41.4 overs)
DB Vengsarkar 95* (151); Imran Khan 4/27 (10 overs)		Saleem Malik 61* (98); Maninder Singh 1/28 (10 overs)

Pakistan won by 8 wickets
Sharjah Cricket Stadium, Sharjah, UAE
Umpires: DP Buultjens (SL) and PW Vidanagamage (SL)
Player of the match: DB Vengsarkar (IND)

- Pakistan won the toss and elected to field.
- Attendance: 18,000.

== See also ==
- Sharjah Cup
