= 2000–01 ARY Gold Cup =

2000-01 ARY Gold Cup
- Date: 8–20 April 2001
- Location: Sharjah, United Arab Emirates
- Result: Won by Sri Lanka
- Player of the series: Inzamam-ul-Haq (PAK)
Teams
New Zealand	Pakistan	Sri Lanka
Captains
Craig McMillan	Waqar Younis	Sanath Jayasuriya
Most runs
Mathew Sinclair (304)	Saeed Anwar (329)	Mahela Jayawardene (290)
Most wickets
Kyle Mills (4) Jacob Oram (4)	Saqlain Mushtaq (9)	Muttiah Muralitharan (9)

The 2000–01 ARY Gold Cup was a triangular ODI cricket competition held in Sharjah, United Arab Emirates from 8 to 20 April 2001. It featured the national cricket teams of New Zealand, Pakistan and Sri Lanka. The tournament was won by Sri Lanka, who defeated Pakistan in the final.

== Points table ==
Team	Pld	W	L	T	NR	NRR	Pts
Pakistan	4	4	0	0	0	+1.166	8
Sri Lanka	4	1	3	0	0	−0.085	2
New Zealand	4	1	3	0	0	−0.989	2

=== 1st ODI ===
8 April (D/N)
Scorecard

Pakistan; 255/9 (50 overs)	v	Sri Lanka; 239 (48.3 overs)
Saeed Anwar 90 (117); Akalanka Ganegama 2/27 (4 overs)		Romesh Kaluwitharana 63 (73); Waqar Younis 4/49 (8 overs)

Pakistan won by 16 runs
Sharjah Cricket Association Stadium, Sharjah
Umpires: Dave Orchard (Aus) and Doug Cowie (NZ)
Player of the match: Saeed Anwar (Pak)

- Pakistan won the toss and elected to bat.
- Humayun Farhat, Mohammad Sami (both Pak) and Akalanka Ganegama (SL) made their ODI debuts.

=== 2nd ODI ===
10 April (D/N)
Scorecard

Sri Lanka; 269/9 (50 overs)	v	New Zealand; 163 (42.1 overs)
Mahela Jayawardene 116 (129); Jacob Oram 3/40 (9 overs)		Mathew Sinclair 60 (89); Muttiah Muralitharan 3/12 (7.1) overs)

Sri Lanka won by 106 runs
Sharjah Cricket Association Stadium, Sharjah
Umpires: John Hampshire (Eng) and Dave Orchard (Aus)
Player of the match: Mahela Jayawardene (SL)

- Sri Lanka won the toss and elected to bat.
- Andre Adams (NZ) made his ODI debut.

=== 3rd ODI ===
12 April (D/N)
Scorecard

New Zealand; 266/7 (50 overs)	v	Pakistan; 270/2 (42.1 overs)
Mathew Sinclair 117 (144); Abdul Razzaq 2/31 (7 overs)		Shahid Afridi 70 (43); Andre Adams 1/38 (8 overs)

Pakistan won by 8 wickets
Sharjah Cricket Association Stadium, Sharjah
Umpires: Doug Cowie (NZ) and John Hampshire (Eng)
Player of the match: Shahid Afridi (Pak)

- New Zealand won the toss and elected to bat.

=== 4th ODI ===
13 April (D/N)
Scorecard

Pakistan; 278/9 (50 overs)	v	Sri Lanka; 250/8 (50 overs)
Saeed Anwar 88 (99); Dilhara Fernando 3/50 (9 overs)		Chaminda Vaas 50* (59); Shahid Afridi 3/44 (10 overs)

Pakistan won by 28 runs
Sharjah Cricket Association Stadium, Sharjah
Umpires: Dave Orchard (Aus) and Doug Cowie (NZ)
Player of the match: Saeed Anwar (Pak)

- Pakistan won the toss and elected to bat.
- Kashif Raza (Pak) made his ODI debut.

=== 5th ODI ===
15 April (D/N)
Scorecard

New Zealand; 127 (31.3 overs)	v	Pakistan; 131/3 (25.2 overs)
Chris Nevin 50 (40); Saqlain Mushtaq 4/17 (7.3 overs)		Inzamam-ul-Haq 85* (67); Jacob Oram 1/23 (5 overs)

Pakistan won by 7 wickets
Sharjah Cricket Association Stadium, Sharjah
Umpires: John Hampshire (Eng) and Dave Orchard (Aus)
Player of the match: Saqlain Mushtaq (Pak)

- New Zealand won the toss and elected to bat.
- Kyle Mills (NZ) made his ODI debut.

=== 6th ODI ===
17 April (D/N)
Scorecard

New Zealand; 248/6 (50 overs)	v	Sri Lanka; 169/8 (50 overs)
Mathew Sinclair 118* (137); Sanath Jayasuriya 2/47 (10 overs)		Mahela Jayawardene 41 (55); Kyle Mills 3/30 (10 overs)

New Zealand won by 79 runs
Sharjah Cricket Association Stadium, Sharjah
Umpires: Doug Cowie (NZ) and John Hampshire (Eng)
Player of the match: Mathew Sinclair and Kyle Mills (both NZ)

- Sri Lanka won the toss and elected to field.

== Final ==
20 April (D/N)
Scorecard

Sri Lanka; 297/7 (50 overs)	v	Pakistan; 220 (41.4 overs)
Marvan Atapattu 89 (119); Saqlain Mushtaq 3/54 (9 overs)		Saeed Anwar 62 (64); Chaminda Vaas 3/36 (6 overs)

Sri Lanka won by 77 runs
Sharjah Cricket Association Stadium, Sharjah
Umpires: Dave Orchard (Aus) and Doug Cowie (NZ)
Player of the match: Marvan Atapattu (SL)

- Sri Lanka won the toss and elected to bat.
