= 1988–89 Sharjah Cup =

International cricket tournament

1989 Sharjah Cup
- Cricket format: One Day International
- Host(s): United Arab Emirates
- Champions: Pakistan
- Runners-up: Sri Lanka
- Participants: 2
- Matches: 2
- Player of the series: (Pakistan) Saleem Malik
- Most runs: (Pakistan) Saleem Malik (171)
- Most wickets: (Pakistan) Imran Khan (5)

The 1989 Sharjah Cup was held in Sharjah, UAE, between March 23–24, 1989. Two national teams took part: Pakistan and Sri Lanka.

The beneficiaries of the series were Abdul Qadir and Salahuddin.

== Matches ==
23 March 1989
Scorecard
Wisden report

Pakistan; 237/8 (50 overs)	v	Sri Lanka; 207 (48.4 overs)
Shoaib Mohammad 76 (94); JR Ratnayeke 2/31 (10 overs)		PA de Silva 48 (58); Aaqib Javed 2/15 (6.4 overs)

Pakistan won by 30 runs
Sharjah Cricket Stadium, Sharjah, UAE
Umpires: RB Gupta (IND) and VK Ramaswamy (IND)
Player of the match: Shoaib Mohammad (PAK)

- Sri Lanka won the toss and elected to field.
- Mushtaq Ahmed (PAK) made his ODI debut.

24 March 1989
Scorecard
Wisden report

Sri Lanka; 244/8 (50 overs)	v	Pakistan; 248/3 (47.5 overs)
DSBP Kuruppu 63 (98); Imran Khan 3/49 (10 overs)		Saleem Malik 100* (112); JR Ratnayeke 1/35 (9 overs)

Pakistan won by 7 wickets
Sharjah Cricket Stadium, Sharjah, UAE
Umpires: RB Gupta (IND) and VK Ramaswamy (IND)
Player of the match: Saleem Malik (PAK)

- Sri Lanka won the toss and elected to bat.
- NLK Ratnayake (SL) made his ODI debut.

== See also ==
- Sharjah Cup
