= Sajid Ali (Sindh cricketer) =

Pakistani cricketer

Cricket information
- Batting: Right-handed
- Bowling: Right-arm medium

Career statistics
Competition	ODI
Matches	13
Runs scored	130
Batting average	10.83
100s/50s	0/0
Top score	28
Catches/stumpings	1/-
- Source: Cricinfo, 3 May 2006

Sajid Ali (born 1 July 1963) is a Pakistani former cricketer who played 13 One Day Internationals (ODIs) between 1984 and 1997.

He had an unusually extended first-class cricket career, from 1982/83 until his last match for Pakistan Customs in December 2005, a period of 22 years. For the majority of his first-class career he played for National Bank of Pakistan for whom he scored over 10,000 runs, a record for the team.

Sajid Ali played 13 ODIs for Pakistan over almost as many years without ever producing a performance to earn a regular spot in the side. In 12 ODI innings he only scraped 130 runs, with a best of 28. His first-class career was as prolonged, stretching over 22 seasons.

In February 2020, he was named in Pakistan's squad for the Over-50s Cricket World Cup in South Africa. However, the tournament was cancelled during the third round of matches due to the coronavirus pandemic.
