= Steve Dunne (cricket umpire) =

New Zealand cricketer and umpire

Personal information
- Full name: Richard Stephen Dunne
- Born: 22 April 1943 (age 83); Dunedin, Otago, New Zealand
- Batting: Right-handed
- Bowling: Left-arm medium
- Role: Bowler

Domestic team information
- Years: Team
- 1968/69: Otago

Umpiring information
- Tests umpired: 39 (1989–2002)
- ODIs umpired: 100 (1989–2002)
- WODIs umpired: 11 (1995–2000)

Career statistics
| Competition | First-class |
|---|---|
| Matches | 6 |
| Runs scored | 30 |
| Batting average | 4.28 |
| 100s/50s | 0/0 |
| Top score | 7 |
| Balls bowled | 951 |
| Wickets | 10 |
| Bowling average | 41.10 |
| 5 wickets in innings | 0 |
| 10 wickets in match | 0 |
| Best bowling | 3/47 |
| Catches/stumpings | 4/– |
- Source: CricketArchive, 27 February 2024

Robert Stephen Dunne (born 22 April 1943) is a former New Zealand cricket umpire and a former first-class cricketer. He was the first umpire to officiate in 100 One Day International matches.

== Career ==
Dunne was born at Dunedin in Otago in 1943. He is married with two sons. Before becoming an umpire, he played in one first-class match for New Zealand Under-23s in March 1966 and five first-class matches for Otago in the Plunket Shield in 1968/9 as a left-arm medium-paced bowler. He took 10 wickets at an average of 41.10.

Dunne umpired 39 Test matches and 100 ODIs between 1989 and 2002. His first 12 Tests were in New Zealand. In 1994, he and Brian Aldridge were the two New Zealand representatives on the first international panel of umpires, set up by the ICC to ensure that one neutral umpire would stand in every Test match (later supplemented by the Elite Panel of ICC Umpires).

In the 2nd ODI between New Zealand and Pakistan in December 1992, at McLean Park in Napier, he made the first run out decisions in New Zealand by a television third umpire.

He stood with Darrell Hair in the Boxing Day Test between Australia and Sri Lanka at the Melbourne Cricket Ground in 1995, in which Hair no-balled Muttiah Muralitharan for throwing. Dunne was criticised for failing to back Hair by similarly calling no-ball later in the match when Muralitharan bowled from Dunne's end, but he later defended himself, saying that the decision was too difficult to make on the field, and that he backed a previous decision to refer a bowler with a suspect action to the International Cricket Council for further investigation. In 2001, he and Doug Cowie reported Shoaib Akhtar after an ODI in at Carisbrook in Dunedin.

He stood in four matches in the 1996 Cricket World Cup, including the semi-final between India and Sri Lanka at Eden Gardens in Calcutta, which was abandoned due to the rioting crowd after India lost their eighth wicket chasing the Sri Lankan score. The match was awarded to Sri Lanka. He also umpired in five matches in the 1999 Cricket World Cup. In 1999/2000, he stood in Pakistan's first Test match in India for 12 years, and the first Test between the sides for nine years, at the M. A. Chidambaram Stadium in Chennai.

His 100th ODI was the match between New Zealand and England at his home ground in Dunedin on 26 February 2002. He had also stood in his first ODI at Carisbrook, just over 13 years earlier.

He retired after he was not chosen as one of the eight umpires on the Elite Panel of ICC Umpires. He published an account of his experiences, Alone in the Middle, in 2003.

== See also ==
- List of Test cricket umpires
- List of One Day International cricket umpires
