= Doug Cowie (umpire) =

New Zealand cricket umpire

Personal information
- Full name: Douglas Bruce Cowie
- Born: 2 December 1946 (age 79); Kaitaia, New Zealand

Umpiring information
- Tests umpired: 22 (1995–2002)
- ODIs umpired: 71 (1992–2005)
- WODIs umpired: 3 (2003–2004)
- Source: Cricinfo, 8 September 2007

Douglas Bruce Cowie (born 2 December 1946) is a former cricket umpire from New Zealand. He officiated at first-class level for over two decades, before a ten-year spell at international level saw him stand in 22 Tests and 71 ODIs. Cowie also officiated in the 1999 World Cup in England. He retired from all forms of umpiring in 2005.

Following his retirement as an umpire, Cowie worked for the ICC as the manager for umpires and referees. He left this job in 2008.

As of 2024, Cowie works as an Umpiring Administrator for the Auckland Cricket.

== See also ==
- List of Test cricket umpires
- List of One Day International cricket umpires
