= David Shepherd (umpire) =

English cricket umpire

David Shepherd MBE

Personal information
- Full name: David Robert Shepherd
- Born: 27 December 1940; Bideford, Devon, England
- Died: 27 October 2009 (aged 68); Instow, Devon, England
- Nickname: Shep
- Height: 5 ft 10 in (1.78 m)
- Batting: Right-handed
- Bowling: Right-arm medium
- Role: Umpire

Domestic team information
- Years: Team
- 1965–1979: Gloucestershire

Umpiring information
- Tests umpired: 92 (1985–2005)
- ODIs umpired: 172 (1983–2005)
- WODIs umpired: 1 (2000)

Career statistics
Competition	First-class	LA
Matches	282	183
Runs scored	10,672	3,330
Batting average	24.47	21.34
100s/50s	12/55	1/13
Top score	153	100
Balls bowled	196	12
Wickets	2	0
Bowling average	53.00	–
5 wickets in innings	0	–
10 wickets in match	0	–
Best bowling	1/1	–
Catches/stumpings	95/–	34/–
- Source: Cricinfo, 8 September 2007

David Robert Shepherd MBE (27 December 1940 – 27 October 2009) was a first-class cricketer who played county cricket for Gloucestershire, and later became one of the cricket world's best-known umpires. He stood in 92 Test matches, the last of them in June 2005, the most for any English umpire. He also umpired 172 ODIs, including three consecutive World Cup finals in 1996, 1999 and 2003.

== Early life ==
Shepherd was born in Bideford in Devon. His father Herbert was a sub-postmaster, having earlier worked in the Merchant Navy. His father had played cricket and rugby in his youth, and became an umpire for North Devon Cricket Club after losing the sight in one eye in the First World War. Shepherd's brother Bill was also a cricketer who captained MCC Young Professionals, but became postmaster at his parents' post office in Instow in the 1960s, playing club and the Minor Counties cricket.

He was educated at Barnstaple Grammar School, where he played for the school first XI from the second form and became head boy. He then studied at St Luke's College, Exeter. He also played cricket for Devon Colts and England Schools, including one match against his brother captaining MCC Young Professionals at Lord's. He became a teacher in Bideford and Ilfracombe, also playing Minor Counties cricket for Devon from 1959 to 1964, mainly as a batsman.

== Playing career ==
After scoring 100 not out for Gloucestershire's Second XI in 1964, Shepherd had a reasonably successful, though late-starting, first-class playing career for Gloucestershire, stretching from 1965 to 1979, and though he never came close to international selection he was popular both with his teammates and the Gloucestershire supporters. He started with a bang, scoring 108 on debut against Oxford University in April 1965, and made eleven more hundreds over the years, though only twice (in 1969 and 1975) did he average over 30. Mainly a middle-order batsman, and never the slimmest of men even in his younger days, he relied more on his fine shot placement than speed across the ground, and his bowling was almost non-existent: he took only two wickets in his entire first-class career. One famous incident at the Gloucestershire Cricket Club saw Shepherd hitting the ball so hard into the crowd that it knocked out a spectator reading a newspaper. The spectator was taken to hospital and recovered with only minor injuries.

== Umpire ==
After retiring from his playing career in 1979, Shepherd decided against becoming a coach, and decided to become an umpire instead. He began his second career in cricket, and the one which was to make him world-famous, when he was appointed as a first-class umpire in 1981. Quickly recognised as being one of the fairest-minded and most able officials in the game, within two years he was part of the umpiring panel for the 1983 World Cup, and within four he was standing in his first Test: the fourth Test of the 1985 Ashes series at Old Trafford. Standing with him in this Test was Dickie Bird.

From then on, Shepherd became a fixture on the international scene, his round figure recognisable by players and spectators alike. His most famous quirk was his habit of lifting one foot off the ground whenever the score reached 111, or multiples thereof, they being regarded as unlucky by Shepherd in a ritual dating back to his childhood cricket team days. The number 111 is known as the "Nelson", and is considered unlucky for the batsman. Among other superstitions, he would tie a matchstick to a finger on Friday 13th, so he would be touching wood to bring good luck all day. Also famous was his tendency to shake his hand while signalling fours; to this day, many fans in cricket crowds mimic his action while celebrating fours.

If the situation demanded, Shepherd could be very firm, notably when initially warning the Pakistan captain, Waqar Younis, in the 2003 World Cup against Australia for bowling fast 'beamers' (a full toss that reaches the batsman between waist and head height, being dangerous as it is extremely hard to detect for the batsman). Waqar again transgressed and Shepherd ordered his removal from the attack becoming the first umpire to take such an action during an international match.

He considered retiring after he received much adverse press coverage in 2001, when Pakistan won the Old Trafford Test against England, after Shepherd gave three England batsmen out to no-balls bowled by Saqlain Mushtaq, who had stepped over the crease, but he was part of the ICC's first Elite Panel of neutral umpires established in 2002, and retained his place unbroken until his retirement from umpiring in 2005.

As his retirement loomed, Shepherd was lauded wherever he went. He was given a guard of honour by the New Zealand and Australian teams during the series between the two countries in March 2005. After his last Test, that between West Indies and Pakistan at Kingston, Jamaica in June 2005, Shepherd was presented with a bat by West Indian captain Brian Lara. He was in fact given special dispensation by the ICC to umpire in an Ashes match between England and Australia at Lord's as his final Test, but turned down the opportunity to maintain the ICC's neutral umpiring policy for Test matches.

His fellow umpire Simon Taufel said of him, as quoted in his Wisden obituary: "What doesn't get highlighted is man-management skills, creating a happy environment for players to play in. And Shep was magnificent at that. The players had this enormous respect for him as a person. He put them at their ease and forged relationships that crossed all cultural and political divides." In that obituary, the obituarist himself wrote: "The authorities struggle for a definition of the Spirit of Cricket. Perhaps the best answer is David Shepherd."

Shepherd was appointed Member of the Order of the British Empire (MBE) for services to cricket in the 1997 Birthday Honours, and he became the President of his home county club Devon in 2006.

Shepherd was the first umpire to officiate in at least one Test match in all the nations playing Test cricket at that time.

== Later life ==
Shepherd retired to Devon, and returned to live in the seaside village of Instow, occasionally working in his brother's post office. He was married to Jenny, his partner since 1973, in 2008. He died of lung cancer on 27 October 2009 in Devon.

== See also ==
- David Shepherd Trophy
- List of Test cricket umpires
- List of One Day International cricket umpires
