= Dickie Bird =

English cricketer and umpire (1933–2025)

Dickie Bird OBE
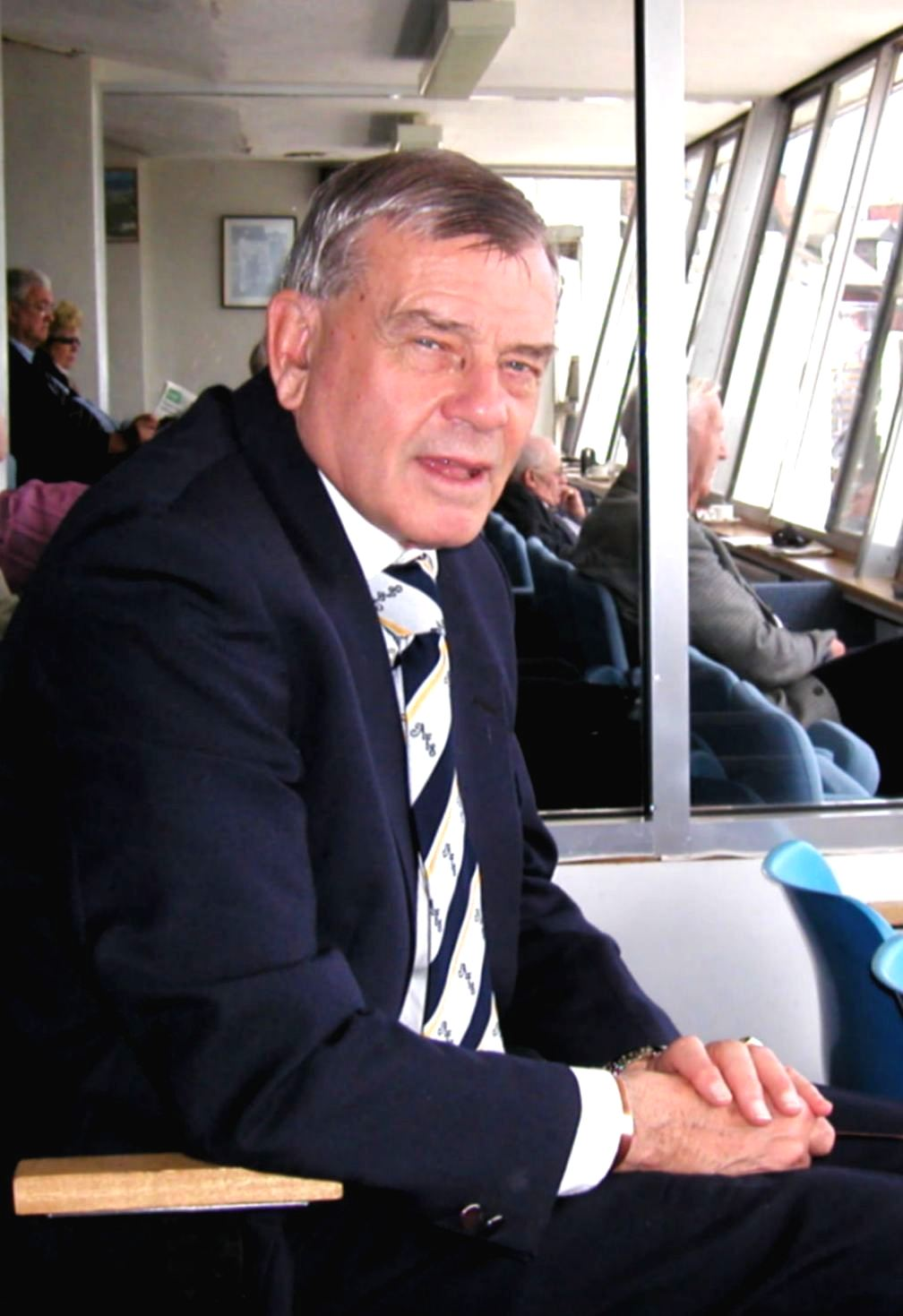
- Bird in 2006

Personal information
- Full name: Harold Dennis Bird
- Born: 19 April 1933; Barnsley, West Riding of Yorkshire, England
- Died: 22 September 2025 (aged 92)
- Nickname: Dickie
- Height: 5 ft 11 in (1.80 m)
- Batting: Right-handed
- Bowling: Right-arm off-break
- Role: Batsman, Umpire

Domestic team information
- Years: Team
- 1956–1959: Yorkshire
- 1960–1964: Leicestershire
- FC debut: 16 May 1956 Yorkshire v Scotland
- Last FC: 12 August 1964 Leicestershire v Essex
- LA debut: 1 May 1963 Leicestershire v Lancashire
- Last LA: 27 May 1964 Leicestershire v Northamptonshire

Umpiring information
- Tests umpired: 66 (1973–1996)
- ODIs umpired: 69 (1973–1995)
- WODIs umpired: 7 (1982)

Career statistics
Competition	First-class	List A
Matches	93	2
Runs scored	3,314	9
Batting average	20.71	4.50
100s/50s	2/14	0/0
Top score	181*	7
Balls bowled	48	–
Wickets	0	–
Bowling average	–	–
5 wickets in innings	–	–
10 wickets in match	–	–
Best bowling	–	–
Catches/stumpings	28/–	0/–
- Source: CricketArchive, 19 August 2007

Harold Dennis "Dickie" Bird OBE (19 April 1933 – 22 September 2025) was an English cricketer and international cricket umpire. During his long umpiring career, he became a well regarded figure among players and the viewing public, not only due to his high standards as an umpire but also for humour and eccentricity.

Bird played first-class cricket for Yorkshire and Leicestershire as a right-handed batsman, but only scored two centuries in 93 appearances. His career was blighted by a knee injury, which eventually forced him to retire at the age of 31. He umpired in 66 Test matches (at the time a world record) and 69 One Day Internationals, including three World Cup Finals. Bird's autobiography, published in 1997, sold more than a million copies.

== Early life ==
Harold Dennis Bird was born on 19 April 1933 at Church Lane, Barnsley, West Riding of Yorkshire, England, but when he was two years old, he moved with his family to New Lodge estate as his house was pulled down in a slum clearance scheme. He was the eldest of three children. of James Harold Bird, (1899-1969) a coal miner, and Ethel Bird nee Smith (1903-1978). He gained the nickname 'Dickie' at school. In 1944, Bird failed his 11-plus examination and went to Raley Secondary Modern School, leaving at the age of 15. For a while, he worked at a coal mine, but gave it up, deciding it was not for him. Instead, he set out for a career in sport. One of his childhood friends was the Manchester United and England footballer Tommy Taylor (killed in the 1958 Munich air disaster).

== Playing career ==
When a knee injury put paid to playing football professionally, he followed his second love, cricket. In his early career in Barnsley, he played club cricket in the same team as journalist and chat show host Michael Parkinson, who became a lifelong friend; they were later joined in the team by Geoffrey Boycott. In 1956, Bird signed up with his home county, Yorkshire. Boycott has spoken highly of Bird's ability as a batsman, but feels that his attempt to forge a career as a county cricketer was hampered by his inability to control his nerves – although he was also not helped by stiff competition for the opening batsman's position. Indeed, after scoring his first (and only) County Championship century of 181* in a 1959 match against Glamorgan at Bradford, in the absence of the regular opener Ken Taylor (who was playing for England), he was dropped when Taylor returned from international duty in the next match. Bird played only five more championship matches that season (plus the MCC versus Champion County match), four in the middle order rather than his preferred opener's position, and spent most of the season as "twelfth man" which was hardly conducive to building confidence in his batting. Shortly before the start of the 1960 season he moved to Leicestershire, where at first he enjoyed a more or less regular place in the team. In his first season (1960), he scored over 1,000 runs, including a century against the touring South Africans which would prove to be his only other first-class century. However, he faded out of the team, thanks to a combination of loss of form, confidence and a recurrence of his persistent knee injury, playing his last match in 1964. Overall, between 1956 and 1964, Bird played first-class cricket as a batsman for Yorkshire and Leicestershire in 93 matches, mostly in the County Championship.

After his county career ended Bird was a cricket professional for Paignton between 1965 and 1969, scoring over 10,000 runs. He coached cricket at Plymouth College between 1966 and 1968, and coached in Johannesburg in 1968 and 1969.

== Umpiring career ==
Bird umpired his first county game in 1970. Three years later, he officiated at his first Test match, England v New Zealand at Headingley in Leeds. The other umpire was Charlie Eliott as England won by an innings and one run. Bird also umpired in the second and third tests of that summer's tour by the West Indies – both of which proved eventful. In the second test at Edgbaston, Bird had to umpire from the bowler's end at both ends for a couple of overs, with a substitute umpire at square leg, when Arthur Fagg refused to continue in protest against the conduct of the West Indian players. Then, in the third test at Lords, play was interrupted by an IRA bomb scare (later found out to be a hoax). While the crowd cleared out of the ground in record time, Bird and the players sat down in the centre of the pitch, knowing there was no bomb there. He gained a reputation for stopping play for weather, and almost never giving batsmen out LBW – he gave LBWs so seldom that if he did give it, there was absolutely no doubt the batsman was out. Bird was also very strict on the definitions of "intimidatory bowling", both from short-pitched deliveries and high full tosses, and made it abundantly clear he would tolerate none of it.

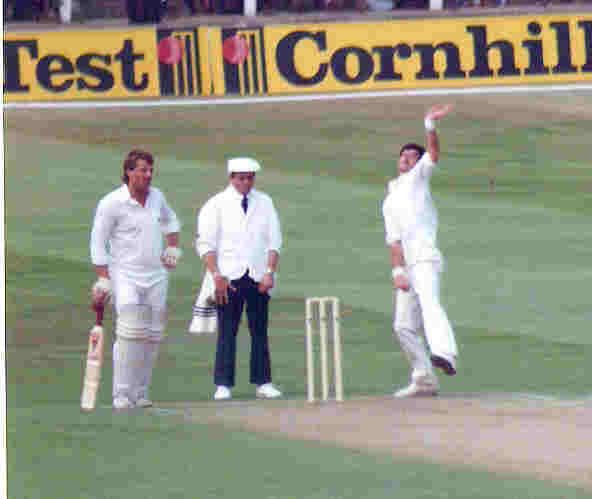
Dickie Bird umpiring the Fourth Test between England and New Zealand in 1983 at Trent Bridge, standing between Ian Botham and Richard Hadlee

Bird was an umpire in the final of the inaugural Cricket World Cup in 1975. A pitch invasion followed the West Indies' 17-run victory, and a number of players and umpires had items of their playing outfits "souvenired" by the crowd. A year later, Bird was a passenger on a bus in South London, when he noticed the conductor was wearing a white hat very similar to the one he favoured, and asked the conductor where he obtained it from.

"Man, haven't you heard of Mr Dickie Bird," he replied. "This is one of his hats. I took it off his head at the World Cup final... we all ran onto the field and I won the race."

Bird's attention to detail was placed under scrutiny at the Centenary Test between England and Australia at Lord's in 1980. Although the Saturday of this particular match had mostly pleasant sunshine, Bird and his fellow umpire, David Constant, refused to let play start because of the previous night's rain; parts of the outfield were still too waterlogged, according to the officials. Angry Marylebone Cricket Club (MCC) members scuffled with Constant as he and the team captains returned to the Long Room after their fifth pitch inspection. The two captains, Ian Botham and Greg Chappell, had to intervene to protect Constant. Bird, however, was still on the pitch at the time according to his own recounting of the event in his book. When play finally started at 3:45 pm, police had to escort the umpires through the Long Room and on to the field. This was not the only occasion where Bird had to stop play, despite current sunny conditions, because of previous bad weather. In the 1988 Test at Headingley against the West Indies, an overnight rainstorm caused a burst pipe and a blocked drain to overflow with a delayed action. The pitch was fine but the bowler's run-up was slowly flooding from underneath, the water level was oozing up over Curtly Ambrose's bootlaces, and Bird's as well when he went over to investigate, and the umpires had to take the players off while the outfield was cleared of water.

One of Bird's strengths was his ability to manage and earn the respect of some of the more volatile players in the game, sometimes by using his infectious humour. He was also known as being eccentric, famously arriving at a ground five hours early as the Queen was to visit that day.

At the beginning of his final Test in 1996, the two teams – India and England – formed a guard of honour as he came out, and he received a standing ovation from the crowd. Bird, an emotional man, was in tears. His eyes had to clear quickly, though, because two minutes later he had to give England captain Michael Atherton out LBW in the first over. Two years later, in 1998, he stood in his last county match.

Bird umpired in 66 Test matches (at the time a world record) and 69 One Day Internationals including three World Cup Finals.

He came out of retirement in January 2007 to umpire in the XXXX Gold Beach Cricket Tri-Nations series involving cricketing legends from England, the West Indies and Australia, which partly took place at Scarborough Beach in Perth, Western Australia.

== Post-retirement ==
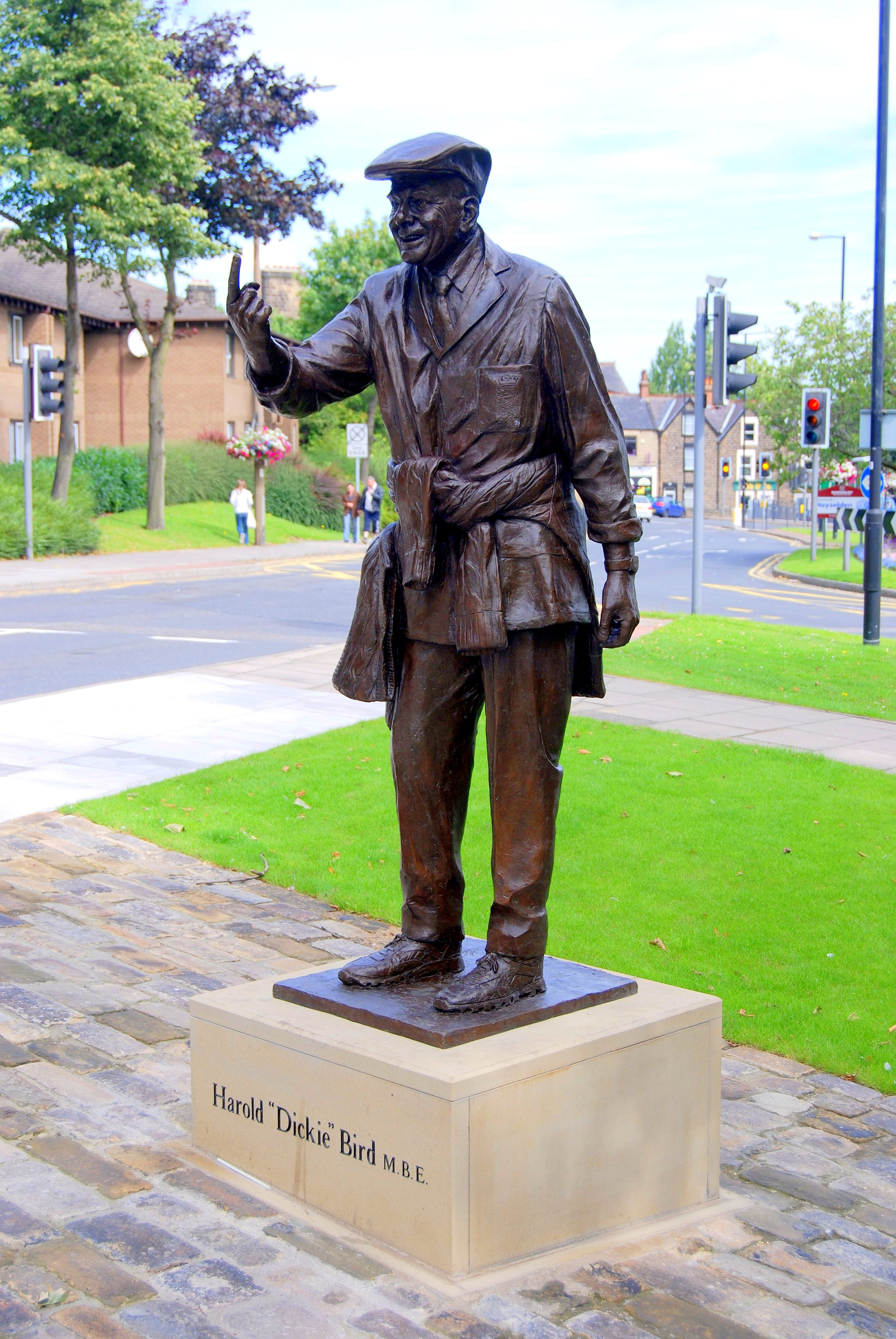
Statue of Bird as an umpire, in Barnsley, in 2009

Bird went on to write his autobiography, simply titled My Autobiography (with a foreword by Michael Parkinson), which sold more than a million copies. A sequel titled White Cap and Bails – Adventures of a Much Travelled Umpire was published in 1999 by Hodder and Stoughton. Bird set up the Dickie Bird Foundation to help disadvantaged under-18s achieve their potential in sport.

He was the subject of This Is Your Life in 1992 when he was surprised by Michael Aspel at Yorkshire Television.

Bird appeared in one episode of Trigger Happy TV. He also appeared in an episode of Top Gear in 2010. That year he also took part in BBC's The Young Ones, in which six celebrities in their seventies and eighties, attempted to overcome some of the problems of ageing, by harking back to the 1970s. He also made a guest appearance in Series 16 of Heartbeat umpiring a cricket match in the episode "Stumped".

Bird was appointed Member of the Order of the British Empire (MBE) in 1986 and Officer of the Order of the British Empire (OBE) in the 2012 New Year Honours for services to cricket and charity. Bird also received honorary doctorates from Huddersfield, Leeds and Sheffield Hallam Universities. He was awarded the Freedom of Barnsley in 2000 and Honorary Life Membership of the Marylebone Cricket Club in 1996.

On 30 June 2009 Bird unveiled a life-sized bronze statue of himself, by fellow Barnsley resident Graham Ibbeson, erected in his honour, near his birthplace in Barnsley. In 2013 it was subsequently raised by adding a 5-foot (1.5 m) plinth, in order to discourage late-night revellers from hanging inappropriate items on the famous finger.

On his pending appointment as President of Yorkshire CCC in 2014, Bird stated "Never in my wildest dreams did I think that I would become the president of the greatest cricket club in the world".

In August 2014, Bird was one of 200 public figures who were signatories to a letter to The Guardian expressing their hope that Scotland would vote to remain part of the United Kingdom in September's referendum on that issue.

In March 2021, Bird spoke to the BBC about his loneliness while shielding during the COVID-19 lockdown. He said that exercise was the key to him keeping his spirits up.

== Death and tributes ==
Bird died at his home on 22 September 2025, aged 92. Following the announcement of his death, tributes were paid across the sporting world and public life. Yorkshire County Cricket Club described him as "one of the greatest characters in Yorkshire's history." Mayor of Barnsley Dave Leech called him "a global sporting icon, a wonderful ambassador for Barnsley, and a friend to anyone he met." Former Prime Minister David Cameron called Bird "a national treasure." Former England cricketer Sir Geoffrey Boycott, a friend of Bird's for over 70 years, described him as "respected, admired and loved." He added, "Dickie was a character and he was always fun."

== Umpiring records ==
As of June 2021, Bird held the record for officiating at the most Test matches in a single nation – 54 in England and officiated in more test matches at Lord's (15) than any other umpire.
