= List of West Indies Test cricket records =

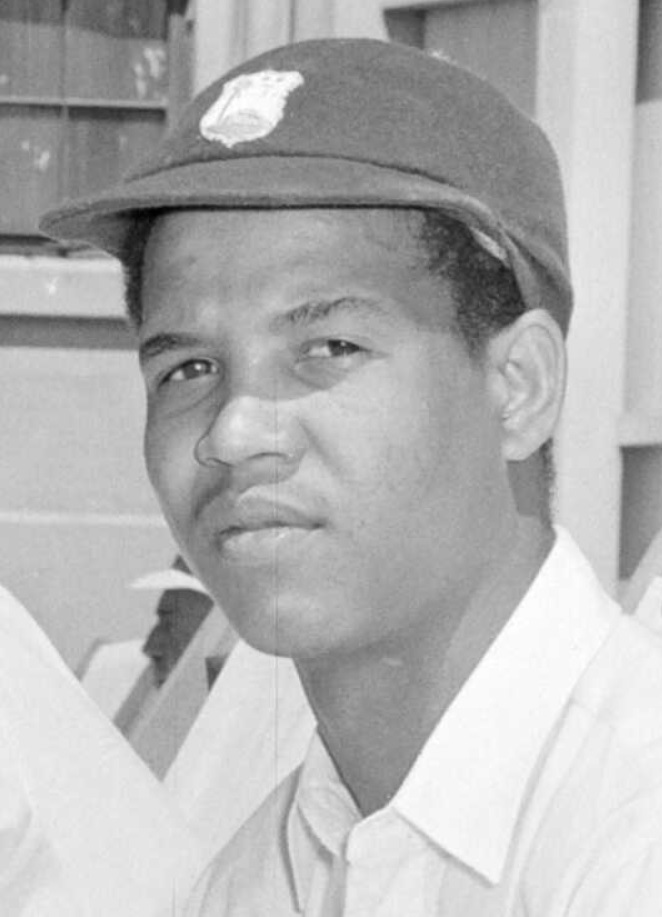
Garfield Sobers, West Indies all-rounder, scored 8,032 runs in Test cricket (the fourth highest for West Indies) and took 235 wickets (eighth highest for West Indies). He held the world record for the highest individual Test innings score, 365 not out, for more than 36 years.

Test cricket is the oldest form of cricket played at international level. A Test match is scheduled to take place over a period of five days, (Note: For the first 50 years of Test cricket matches were played over three or। four days and until the 1930s some timeless Tests were played.) (Note: In October 2017, the ICC Board approved a trial of four-day Test cricket to run through until the 2019 Cricket World Cup.) and is played by teams representing full member nations of the International Cricket Council (ICC). This is a list of West Indies Test cricket records. It is based on the list of Test cricket records, but concentrates solely on records dealing with the West Indian Test cricket team, and any cricketers who have played for that team.

== Key ==
The top five records are listed for each category, except for the team wins, losses, draws and ties and the partnership records. Tied records for fifth place are also included. Explanations of the general symbols and cricketing terms used in the list are given below. Specific details are provided in each category where appropriate. All records include matches played for West Indies only, and are correct as of January 2020.

Key
Symbol	Meaning
†	Player or umpire is currently active in Test cricket
*	Player remained not out or partnership remained unbroken
♠	Test cricket record
d	Innings was declared (e.g. 8/758d)
Date	Starting date of the Test match
Innings	Number of innings played
Matches	Number of matches played
Opposition	The team The West Indies was playing against
Period	The time period when the player was active in Test cricket
Player	The player involved in the record
Venue	Test cricket ground where the match was played

== Team records ==
=== Team wins, losses, draws and ties ===
As of July 2025, West Indies played 586 Test matches resulting in 185 victories, 218 defeats, 182 draws and 1 tie for an overall winning percentage of 31.57.

Opponent	1st Test	Matches	Won	Lost	Drawn	Tied	% Won
Afghanistan	2019	1	1	0	0	0	100.00
Australia	1930	123	33	64	25	1	26.83
Bangladesh	2002	22	15	5	2	0	68.18
England	1928	166	59	54	53	0	35.54
India	1948	100	30	23	47	0	30.00
New Zealand	1952	49	13	17	19	0	26.53
Pakistan	1958	56	19	22	15	0	33.92
South Africa	1992	34	3	23	8	0	8.82
Sri Lanka	1993	24	4	11	9	0	16.66
Zimbabwe	2000	12	8	0	4	0	66.66
Total		587	185	219	182	1	31.52
Last updated: 14 July 2025

=== First Test series wins ===
Opponent	Home	Away / Neutral
Afghanistan	YTP	2019
Australia	1965	1980
Bangladesh	2004	2002
England	1935	1950
India	1953	1949
Ireland	YTP	YTP
New Zealand	1985	1952
Pakistan	1958	1980
South Africa	1992	–
Sri Lanka	1997	–
Zimbabwe	2000	2001
Last updated: 10 July 2025

=== First Test match wins ===
Opponent	Home		Away / Neutral	
Opponent	Venue	Year	Venue	Year
Afghanistan	YTP		Lucknow	2019
Australia	Kingston	1965	Sydney	1980
Bangladesh	Kingston	2004	Dhaka	2002
England	Georgetown	1930	Lord's	1950
India	Bridgetown	1953	Chennai	1949
Ireland	YTP			
New Zealand	Bridgetown	1985	Christchurch	1952
Pakistan	Port of Spain	1958	Lahore	1959
South Africa	Bridgetown	1992	Port Elizabeth	2007
Sri Lanka	St. John's	1997	-	
Zimbabwe	Port of Spain	2000	Bulawayo	2001
Last updated: 10 July 2025

=== Team scoring records ===
==== Most runs in an innings ====
The highest innings total scored in Test cricket came in the series between Sri Lanka and India in August 1997. Playing in the first Test at R. Premadasa Stadium in Colombo, the hosts posted a first innings total of 6/952d. This broke the longstanding record of 7/903d which England set against Australia in the final Test of the 1938 Ashes series at The Oval. The third Test of the 1958 series against Pakistan saw West Indies set their highest innings total of 790/3d.

Rank	Score	Opposition	Venue	Date
1	790/3d	Pakistan	Sabina Park, Kingston, Jamaica	26 February 1958
2	751/5d	England	Antigua Recreation Ground, St. John's, Antigua and Barbuda	10 April 2004
3	749/9d	England	Kensington Oval, Bridgetown, Barbados	26 February 2009
4	747	South Africa	Antigua Recreation Ground, St. John's, Antigua and Barbuda	29 April 2005
5	692/8d	England	Kennington Oval, London, England	24 August 1995
Last updated: 10 July 2025

==== Highest successful run chases ====
West Indies's highest fourth innings total is 418/7 in a successful run chase against Australia at St. John's in May 2003 which is also the highest successful run chase in Test Matches.

Rank	Score	Target	Opposition	Venue	Date
1	418/7	418	Australia	Antigua Recreation Ground, St. John's, Antigua and Barbuda	9 May 2003
2	395/7	395	Bangladesh	Zohur Ahmed Chowdhury Stadium, Chittagong, Bangladesh	3 February 2021
3	348/5	345	New Zealand	Eden Park, Auckland, New Zealand	27 February 1969
4	344/1	342	England	Lord's, London, England	28 June 1984
5	322/5	322	England	Headingley, Leeds, England	25 August 2017
Last updated: 10 July 2025

==== Fewest runs in an innings ====
The lowest innings total scored in Test cricket came in the second Test of England's tour of New Zealand in March 1955. Trailing England by 46, New Zealand was bowled out in their second innings for 26 runs. The lowest score in Test history for West Indies is 27 against Australia in the second innings of the Third Test of the Australian cricket team in the West Indies in 2025.

Rank	Score	Opposition	Venue	Date
1	27	Australia	Sabina Park, Kingston, Jamaica	12 July 2025
2	47	England	Sabina Park, Kingston, Jamaica	11 March 2004
3	51	Australia	Queen's Park Oval, Port of Spain, Trinidad & Tobago	28 November 1947
4	53	Pakistan	Iqbal Stadium, Faisalabad, Pakistan	24 October 1986
5	54	England	Lord's, London, England	29 June 2000
Last updated: 14 July 2025

==== Most runs conceded in an innings ====
The highest innings total scored against West Indies is by England when they scored 849 in the fourth Test of the England's tour of `West Indies in 1930 at Sabina Park.

Rank	Score	Opposition	Venue	Date
1	849	England	Sabina Park, Kingston, Jamaica	3 April 1930
2	758/8d	Australia	Sabina Park, Kingston, Jamaica	11 June 1955
3	668	Australia	Kensington Oval, Bridgetown, Barbados	14 May 1955
4	658/9d	South Africa	Sahara Stadium Kingsmead, Durban, South Africa	26 December 2003
5	657/8d	Pakistan	Kensington Oval, Bridgetown, Barbados	17 January 1958
Last updated: 10 July 2025

==== Fewest runs conceded in an innings ====
The lowest innings total scored against West Indies is 43 in the first test of Bangladesh's tour of West Indies in 2018

Rank	Score	Opposition	Venue	Date
1	43	Bangladesh	Sir Vivian Richards Stadium, Antigua, Antigua and Barbuda	4 July 2018
2	46	England	Queen's Park Oval, Port of Spain, Trinidad and Tobago|	25 March 1994
3	51	England	Sabina Park, Kingston, Jamaica	4 February 2009
4	63	Zimbabwe	Queen's Park Oval, Port of Spain, Trinidad and Tobago|	16 March 2000
5	71	England	Old Trafford, Manchester, England	8 July 1976
Last updated: 14 July 2025

=== Result records ===
A Test match is won when one side has scored more runs than the total runs scored by the opposing side during their two innings. If both sides have completed both their allocated innings and the side that fielded last has the higher aggregate of runs, it is known as a win by runs. This indicates the number of runs that they had scored more than the opposing side. If one side scores more runs in a single innings than the total runs scored by the other side in both their innings, it is known as a win by innings and runs. If the side batting last wins the match, it is known as a win by wickets, indicating the number of wickets that were still to fall.

==== Greatest win margins (by innings) ====
The fifth Test of the 1938 Ashes series at The Oval saw England win by an innings and 579 runs, the largest victory by an innings in Test cricket history. The largest victory for West Indies, which is the third largest, is their win against India in the third Test of the 1958–59 tour at the Eden Gardens, where the hosts lost by an innings and 336 runs.

Rank	Margin	Opposition	Venue	Date
1	Innings and 336 runs	India	Eden Gardens, Kolkata, India	31 December 1958
2	Innings and 322 runs	New Zealand	Basin Reserve, Wellington, New Zealand	10 February 1995
3	Innings and 310 runs	Bangladesh	Bangabandhu National Stadium, Dhaka, Bangladesh	8 December 2002
4	Innings and 226 runs	England	Lord's, London, England	23 August 1973
5	Innings and 219 runs	Bangladesh	Sir Vivian Richards Stadium, Antigua, Antigua and Barbuda	4 July 2018
Last updated: 14 July 2025

==== Greatest win margins (by runs) ====
The greatest winning margin by runs in Test cricket was England's victory over Australia by 675 runs in the first Test of the 1928–29 Ashes series. The largest victory recorded by West Indies, which is the seventh largest victory, is the third Test of the 1976 tour by 425 runs against England at Old Trafford, Manchester.

Rank	Margin	Opposition	Venue	Date
1	425 runs	England	Old Trafford, Manchester, England	8 July 1976
2	408 runs	Australia	Adelaide Oval, Adelaide, Australia	26 January 1980
3	381 runs	England	Kensington Oval, Bridgetown, Barbados	23 January 2019
4	343 runs	Australia	Kensington Oval, Bridgetown, Barbados	19 April 1991
5	326 runs	England	Lord's, London, England	24 June 1950
Last updated: 14 July 2025

==== Greatest win margins (by 10 wickets) ====
West Indies have won a Test match by a margin of 10 wickets on 28 occasions.

Rank	Margin	Opposition	Venue	Date
1	8	England	Sir Vivian Richards Stadium, Antigua, Antigua & Barbuda	31 January 2019
2	6	Australia	Sabina Park, Kingston, Jamaica	13 March 1999
3	5	New Zealand	Queen's Park Oval, Port of Spain, Trinidad & Tobago	16 June 2014
4	4	India	Kensington Oval, Bridgetown, Barbados	2 May 2002
5	3	Bangladesh	Arnos Vale Stadium, Kingstown, Saint Vincent & the Grenadines	5 September 2014
6	1	Pakistan	Kensington Oval, Bridgetown, Barbados	23 April 1993
6	1	Zimbabwe	Sabina Park, Kingston, Jamaica	24 March 2000
Last updated: 14 July 2025

==== Narrowest win margins (by runs) ====
The narrowest win is West Indies's one-run win over Australia in 1993.

Rank	Margin	Opposition	Venue	Date
1	1 run	Australia	Adelaide Oval, Adelaide, Australia	23 January 1993
2	8 runs	Australia	The Gabba, Brisbane, Australia	25 January 2024
3	17 runs	Bangladesh	Shere Bangla National Stadium, Mirpur, Bangladesh	11 February 2021
4	30 runs	Australia	Sydney Cricket Ground, Sydney, Australia	27 February 1931
5	35 runs	Zimbabwe	Queen's Park Oval, Port of Spain, Trinidad & Tobago	16 March 2000
Last updated: 14 July 2025

==== Narrowest win margins (by wickets) ====
West Indies' narrowest win by wickets is by 1 wicket, which they have achieved thrice, has come in the third Test of the 1998-99 Australia tour at Kensington Oval, Barbados and twice against Pakistan, once Pakistan's tour in 2000 at Antigua Recreation Ground, St. John's and during the 2021 tour at Sabina Park, Kingston. These are three of only fifteen one-wicket victories in Test cricket.

Rank	Margin	Opposition	Venue	Date
1	1 wicket	Australia	Kensington Oval, Bridgetown, Barbados	26 March 1999
1	1 wicket	Pakistan	Antigua Recreation Ground, St. John's, Antigua and Barbuda	25 May 2000
1	1 wicket	Pakistan	Sabina Park, Kingston, Jamaica	12 August 2021
4	2 wickets	England	Trent Bridge, Nottingham, England	5 June 1980
4	2 wickets	Pakistan	Kensington Oval, Bridgetown, Barbados	22 April 1988
Last updated: 10 July 2025

==== Greatest loss margins (by innings) ====
The Oval in London played host to the greatest defeat by an innings in Test cricket. The final Test of the 1938 Ashes saw England defeat the tourists by an innings and 579 runs, to the draw the series at one match all. West Indies biggest defeat came during the Wisden Trophy in 2007 when they lost by an innings and 283 runs at Headingley, Leeds.

Rank	Margin	Opposition	Venue	Date
1	Innings and 283 runs	England	Headingley, Leeds, England	25 May 2007
2	Innings and 272 runs	India	Saurashtra Cricket Association Stadium, Rajkot, India	4 October 2018
3	Innings and 237 runs	England	The Oval, London, England	22 August 1957
4	Innings and 220 runs	South Africa	Centurion Park, Centurion, South Africa	17 December 2014
5	Innings and 217 runs	Australia	Brisbane Cricket Ground, Brisbane, Australia	16 January 1931
Last updated: 10 July 2025

==== Greatest loss margins (by runs) ====
The first Test of the 1928–29 Ashes series saw Australia defeated by England by 675 runs, the greatest losing margin by runs in Test cricket. West Indies's biggest defeat by runs was 419 against Australia in the second Test of the 2022 tour of Australia at the Adelaide Oval.

Rank	Margin	Opposition	Venue	Date
1	419 runs	Australia	Adelaide Oval, Adelaide, Australia	8 December 2022
2	382 runs	Australia	Sydney Cricket Ground, Sydney, Australia	14 February 1969
3	379 runs	Australia	Brisbane Cricket Ground, Brisbane, Australia	3 November 2005
4	352 runs	Australia	Melbourne Cricket Ground, Melbourne, Australia	26 December 2000
5	351 runs	South Africa	Centurion Park, Centurion, South Africa	15 January 1999
Last updated: 10 July 2025

==== Greatest loss margins (by 10 wickets) ====
West Indies have lost a Test match by a margin of 10 wickets on 18 occasions.

Rank	Number of Defeats	Opposition	Most Recent Venue	Most Recent Date
1	6	Australia	Adelaide Oval, Adelaide, Australia	17 January 2024
2	5	England	Edgbaston Cricket Ground, Edgbaston, England	26 July 2024
3	2	Pakistan	National Stadium, Karachi, Pakistan	6 December 1997
3	2	Sri Lanka	Sinhalese Sports Club Ground, Colombo, Sri Lanka	29 November 2001
5	1	South Africa	Centurion Park, Centurion, South Africa	16 January 2004
5	1	New Zealand	Basin Reserve, Wellington, New Zealand	16 March 2006
5	1	India	Rajiv Gandhi International Stadium, Hyderabad, India	12 October 2018
Last updated: 10 July 2025

==== Narrowest loss margins (by runs) ====
The narrowest loss of West Indies in terms of runs is by 26 runs against England in the fifth test of the England's tour of West Indies in 1974.

Rank	Margin	Opposition	Venue	Date
1	26 runs	England	Queen's Park Oval, Port of Spain, Trinidad & Tobago	30 March 1974
2	27 runs	New Zealand	Eden Park, Auckland, New Zealand	6 March 2006
3	30 runs	England	Headingley, Leeds, England	10 July 1969
4	35 runs	Australia	WACA Ground, Perth, Australia	16 December 2009
5	37 runs	India	Queen's Park Oval, Port of Spain, Trinidad & Tobago	19 April 2002
Last updated: 10 July 2025

==== Narrowest loss margins (by wickets) ====
The narrowest loss of West Indies in terms of wickets is by 1 wicket twice. First such loss came against Australia in the fourth test of West Indies tour of Australia in 1951-52 and the other one came against New Zealand in the first test of West Indies tour of New Zealand in 1979–80.

Rank	Margin	Opposition	Venue	Date
1	1 wicket	Australia	Melbourne Cricket Ground, Melbourne, Australia	31 December 1951
1	1 wicket	New Zealand	Carisbrook, Dunedin, New Zealand	8 February 1980
2	2 wickets	Australia	Melbourne Cricket Ground, Melbourne, Australia	10 February 1961
2	2 wickets	England	Lord's, London, England	29 June 2000
2	3 wickets	Australia	Brisbane Cricket Ground, Brisbane, Australia	9 November 1951
2	3 wickets	Australia	Bourda, Georgetown, Guyana	31 March 1978
2	3 wickets	India	M. A. Chidambaram Stadium, Chennai, India	12 January 1979
2	3 wickets	England	Queen's Park Oval, Port of Spain, Trinidad & Tobago	13 February 1998
2	3 wickets	Australia	Kensington Oval, Bridgetown, Barbados	7 April 2012
Last updated: 10 July 2025

==== Tied matches ====
A tie can occur when the scores of both teams are equal at the conclusion of play, provided that the side batting last has completed their innings. Only two matches have ended in a tie in Test cricket history, both of which involved Australia.

Opposition	Venue	Date
Australia ♠	The Gabba, Brisbane, Australia	9 December 1960
Last updated: 10 July 2025

== Batting records ==
=== Most career runs ===
A run is the basic means of scoring in cricket. A run is scored when the batsman hits the ball with his bat and with his partner runs the length of 22 yards (20 m) of the pitch. India's Sachin Tendulkar has scored the most runs in Test cricket with 15,921. Second is Ricky Ponting of Australia with 13,378 ahead of Jacques Kallis from South Africa in third with 13,289. Brian Lara and Shivnarine Chanderpaul are the only two West Indian batsmen who have scored more than 10,000 runs in Test cricket.

Rank	Runs	Player	Matches	Innings	Period
1	11,912	Brian Lara	130	230	1990–2006
2	11,867	Shivnarine Chanderpaul	164	280	1994–2015
3	8,540	Viv Richards	121	182	1974–1991
4	8,032	Gary Sobers	93	160	1954–1974
5	7,558	Gordon Greenidge	108	185	1974–1991
6	7,515	Clive Lloyd	110	175	1966–1985
7	7,487	Desmond Haynes	116	202	1978–1994
8	7,214	Chris Gayle	103	182	2000–2014
9	6,227	Rohan Kanhai	79	137	1957–1974
10	5,950	Kraigg Brathwaite	100	193	2011–2025
Last updated: 7 July 2025

=== Fastest runs getter ===
Runs	Batsman	Match	Innings	Record Date	Reference
1000	Everton Weekes	9 ♠	12 ♠	4 February 1949	
2000	George Headley	17	32	24 June 1939	
3000	Everton Weekes	31	51	11 April 1955	
4000	Everton Weekes	22	71	25 July 1957	
5000	Gary Sobers	56	95	4 August 1966	
6000	Gary Sobers	65	111	28 March 1968	
7000	Gary Sobers	79	138	19 March 1971	
8000	Gary Sobers	91	157	16 February 1974	
9000	Brian Lara	101	177	2 January 2004	
10000	Brian Lara	111 ♠	195 ♠	12 August 2004	
11000	Brian Lara	121	213	25 November 2005	
Last updated: 20 June 2020

=== Most runs in each batting position ===
Batting position	Batsman	Innings	Runs	Average	Test Career Span	Ref
Opener	Gordon Greenidge	182	7,488	45.11	1974–1991	
Number 3	Richie Richardson	107	4,711	47.11	1983–1995	
Number 4	Brian Lara	148	7,535	51.26	1990–2006	
Number 5	Shivnarine Chanderpaul	151	6,883	56.42	1994–2015	
Number 6	Garry Sobers	57	2,614	53.35	1954–1974	
Number 7	Jeff Dujon	69	2,113	33.54	1981-1991	
Number 8	Jason Holder†	58	1,525	32.44	2015–2023	
Number 9	Curtly Ambrose	97	973	12.01	1988–2000	
Number 10	Wes Hall	41	462	14.90	1958–1969	
Number 11	Courtney Walsh	122	553	7.47	1984–2001	
Last updated: 25 July 2023.

=== Most runs against each team ===
Opposition	Runs	Player	Matches	Innings	Period	Ref
Afghanistan	111	Shamarh Brooks†	1	1	2019–2019	
Australia	2,815	Brian Lara	30	56	1992-2005	
Bangladesh	1,033	Kraigg Brathwaite†	14	26	2011–2024	
England	3,214	Garry Sobers	36	61	1954-1974	
India	2,344	Clive Lloyd	28	44	1966-1983	
Ireland	YTP					
New Zealand	1,258	Chris Gayle	12	21	2002-2014	
Pakistan	1,173	Brian Lara	12	22	1990-2006	
South Africa	1,715	Brian Lara	18	35	1992-2005	
Sri Lanka	1,125	Brian Lara	8	14	1993-2003	
Zimbabwe	498	Chris Gayle	8	13	2000-2013	
Last updated: 3 December 2024.

=== Highest career average ===
A batsman's batting average is the total number of runs they have scored divided by the number of times they have been dismissed.

Rank	Average	Player	Innings	Runs	Not out	Period
1	60.83	George Headley	40	2,190	4	1930–1954
2	58.61	Everton Weekes	81	4,455	5	1948–1958
3	57.78	Garfield Sobers	160	8,032	21	1954–1974
4	56.68	Clyde Walcott	74	3,78	7	1948–1960
5	54.20	Charlie Davis	29	1,301	5	1968–1973
Qualification: 20 innings. Last updated: 20 June 2020

=== Highest Average in each batting position ===
Batting position	Batsman	Innings	Runs	Average	Career Span	Ref
Opener	Allan Rae	24	1,016	46.18	1948-1953	
Number 3	George Headley	32	2,064	71.17	1930–1954	
Number 4	Gary Sobers	24	1,530	63.75	1956-1969	
Number 5	Frank Worrell	23	1,189	59.45	1948–1962	
Number 6	Shivnarine Chanderpaul	49	2,528	64.82 ♠	1994–2015	
Number 7	Jeff Dujon	69	2,113	33.54	1981-1991	
Number 8	Jason Holder†	56	1,425	30.97	2015–2023	
Number 9	Michael Holding	23	403	17.52	1976–1987	
Number 10	Curtly Ambrose	28	311	17.27	1988-2000	
Number 11	Colin Croft	24	74	10.57	1977-1982	
Last updated: 2 March 2023. Qualification: Min 20 innings batted at position

=== Most half-centuries ===
A half-century is a score of between 50 and 99 runs. Statistically, once a batsman's score reaches 100, it is no longer considered a half-century but a century.

Sachin Tendulkar of India has scored the most half-centuries in Test cricket with 68. He is followed by the West Indies' Shivnarine Chanderpaul on 66, India's Rahul Dravid and Allan Border of Australia on 63 and in fifth with 62 fifties to his name, Australia's Ricky Ponting.

Rank	Half centuries	Player	Innings	Runs	Period
1	66	Shivnarine Chanderpaul	280	11,867	1994–2015
2	48	Brian Lara	230	11,912	1990–2006
3	45	Viv Richards	182	8,542	1974–1991
4	39	Clive Lloyd	175	7,515	1966–1985
4	39	Desmond Haynes	202	7,487	1978–1994
Last updated: 13 December 2015

=== Most centuries ===
A century is a score of 100 or more runs in a single innings.

Tendulkar has also scored the most centuries in Test cricket with 51. South Africa's Jacques Kallis is next on 45 and Ricky Ponting with 41 hundreds is in third. Brian Lara is the highest West Indian on this list with 34 centuries.

Rank	Centuries	Player	Innings	Runs	Period
1	34	Brian Lara	230	11,912	1990–2006
2	30	Shivnarine Chanderpaul	280	11,867	1994–2015
3	26	Garfield Sobers	160	8,032	1954–1974
4	24	Viv Richards	182	8,542	1974–1991
5	19	Clive Lloyd	175	7,515	1966–1985
5	19	Gordon Greenidge	185	7,558	1974-1991
Last updated: 20 June 2020

=== Most double centuries ===
A double century is a score of 200 or more runs in a single innings.

Bradman holds the Test record for the most double centuries scored with twelve, one ahead of Sri Lanka's Kumar Sangakkara who finished his career with eleven. In third is Brian Lara of the West Indies with nine. England's Wally Hammond and Mahela Jayawardene of Sri Lanka both scored seven and Kohli is one of seven cricketers who reached the mark on six occasions.

Rank	Double centuries	Player	Innings	Runs	Period
1	9	Brian Lara	230	11,912	1990–2006
2	4	Gordon Greenidge	185	7,558	1974-1991
3	3	Viv Richards	182	8,540	1974-1991
3	3	Chris Gayle	182	7,214	2000–2014
5	2	George Headley	40	2,190	1930-1954
5	2	Lawrence Rowe	49	2,047	1972-1980
5	2	Seymour Nurse	54	2,523	1960-1969
5	2	Everton Weekes	81	4,455	1948-1958
5	2	Frank Worrell	87	3,860	1948-1963
5	2	Rohan Kanhai	137	6,227	1957-1974
5	2	Ramnaresh Sarwan	154	5,842	2000-2011
5	2	Garfield Sobers	160	8,032	1954–1974
5	2	Shivnarine Chanderpaul	280	11,867	1994–2015
Last updated: 20 June 2020

=== Most triple centuries ===
A triple century is a score of 300 or more runs in a single innings.

Lara and Gayle hold the equal Test record for the most triple centuries scored with two, along with Australia's Don Bradman and India's Virender Sehwag.

Rank	Triple centuries	Player	Innings	Runs	Period
1	2	Chris Gayle	182	7,214	2000–2014
1	2	Brian Lara	230	11,912	1990–2006
3	1	Lawrence Rowe	49	2,047	1972-1980
3	1	Garfield Sobers	160	8,032	1954–1974
Last updated: 20 June 2020

=== Most Sixes ===
Rank	Sixes	Player	Innings	Runs	Period
1	98	Chris Gayle	182	7,214	2000–2014
2	88	Brian Lara	230	11,912	1990–2006
3	84	Viv Richards	182	8,540	1974–1991
4	70	Clive Lloyd	175	7,515	1966–1985
5	67	Gordon Greenidge	185	7,558	1974–1991
Last updated: 20 June 2020

=== Most Fours ===
Rank	Fours	Player	Innings	Runs	Period
1	1,551	Brian Lara	230	11,912	1990–2006
2	1,285	Shivnarine Chanderpaul	280	11,867	1994–2015
3	1,051	Viv Richards	182	8,540	1974–1991
4	1,046	Chris Gayle	182	7,214	2000–2014
5	884	Gordon Greenidge	185	7,558	1974–1991
Last updated: 20 June 2020

=== Most runs in a series ===
The 1930 Ashes series in England saw Don Bradman set the record for the most runs scored in a single series, falling just 26 short of 1,000 runs. He is followed by Wally Hammond with 905 runs scored in the 1928–29 Ashes series. Vivian Richards with 829 runs in the 1976 tour of England is the highest West Indian on the list.

Rank	Runs	Player	Matches	Innings	Series
1	829	Viv Richards	4	7	West Indian cricket team in England in 1976
2	827	Clyde Walcott	5	10	Australian cricket team in the West Indies in 1954-55
3	824	Gary Sobers	5	8	Pakistani cricket team in the West Indies in 1957-58
4	798	Brian Lara	5	8	English cricket team in the West Indies in 1993-94
5	779	Everton Weekes	5	7	West Indian cricket team in India in 1948–49
Last updated: 20 June 2020

=== Most ducks in career ===
A duck refers to a batsman being dismissed without scoring a run. Courtney Walsh holds the record for highest number of ducks in Test cricket.

Rank	Ducks	Player	Matches	Innings	Period
1	43	Courtney Walsh	132	185	1984–2001
2	26	Mervyn Dillon	38	68	1989–2003
2	26	Curtly Ambrose	98	145	1988–2000
4	23	Shannon Gabriel†	58	87	2012–2023
5	20	Kemar Roach†	80	126	2009–2024
Last updated: 18 January 2024

=== Highest individual score ===
The first Test of the 2003–04 series of the Southern Cross Trophy, contested between Australia and Zimbabwe, at the WACA Ground saw Matthew Hayden of Australia set the highest Test score with 380, surpassing the West Indies' Brian Lara's 375 scored against England in April 1994 at the Antigua Recreation Ground. Six months later, during the last test of the England's tour of West Indies in 2003-04 Brian Lara scored the first ever quadruple century and reclaim the world record for highest Individual score.

Rank	Runs	Player	Opposition	Venue	Date
1	400*	Brian Lara	England	Antigua Recreation Ground, St. John's, Antigua and Barbuda	10 April 2004
2	375	Brian Lara	England	Antigua Recreation Ground, St. John's, Antigua and Barbuda	16 April 1994
3	365*	Garfield Sobers	Pakistan	Sabina Park, Kingston, Jamaica	26 February 1958
4	333	Chris Gayle	Sri Lanka	Galle International Stadium, Galle, Sri Lanka	15 November 2010
5	317	Chris Gayle	South Africa	Antigua Recreation Ground, St. John's, Antigua and Barbuda	25 April 2005
Last updated: 20 June 2020

=== Highest individual score against each team ===
Opposition	Runs	Player	Venue	Date	Ref
Afghanistan	111	Shamarh Brooks	Ekana International Cricket Stadium, Lucknow, India	27 November 2019	
Australia	277	Brian Lara	Sydney Cricket Ground, Sydney, Australia	2 January 1993	
Bangladesh	261*	Ramnaresh Sarwan	Sabina Park, Kingston, West Indies	4 June 2004	
England	400*	Brian Lara	Antigua Recreation Ground, Antigua, West Indies	10 April 2004	
India	256	Rohan Kanhai	Eden Gardens, Kolkata, India	31 December 1958	
Ireland	YTP				
New Zealand	258	Seymour Nurse	AMI Stadium, Christchurch, New Zealand	13 March 1969	
Pakistan	365*	Garry Sobers	Sabina Park, Kingston, West Indies	26 February 1958	
South Africa	317	Chris Gayle	Antigua Recreation Ground, Antigua, West Indies	29 April 2005	
Sri Lanka	333	Chris Gayle	Galle International Stadium, Galle, Sri Lanka	15 November 2010	
Zimbabwe	207*	Tagenarine Chanderpaul	Queens Sports Club, Bulawayo, Zimbabwe	4 February 2023	
Last updated: 11 February 2023

=== Highest individual score – progression of record ===
Runs	Player	Opponent	Venue	Season
52	Joe Small	England	Lord's, London, England	1928
53	Clifford Roach	England	Kennington Oval, London, England	1928
176	George Headley	England	Kensington Oval, Bridgetown, Barbados	1929-30
209	Clifford Roach	England	Bourda, Georgetown, Guyana	1929-30
223	George Headley	England	Sabina Park, Kingston, Jamaica	1929-30
270*	George Headley	England	Sabina Park, Kingston, Jamaica	1934-35
365*	Garfield Sobers	Pakistan	Sabina Park, Kingston, Jamaica	1957–58
375	Brian Lara	England	Antigua Recreation Ground, St. John's, Antigua and Barbuda	1993-94
400*	Brian Lara	England	Antigua Recreation Ground, St. John's, Antigua and Barbuda	2003–04
Last updated: 20 June 2020

=== Highest partnerships by wicket ===
In cricket, two batsmen are always present at the crease batting together in a partnership. This partnership will continue until one of them is dismissed, retires or the innings comes to a close.

A wicket partnership describes the number of runs scored before each wicket falls. The first wicket partnership is between the opening batsmen and continues until the first wicket falls. The second wicket partnership then commences between the not out batsman and the number three batsman. This partnership continues until the second wicket falls. The third wicket partnership then commences between the not out batsman and the new batsman. This continues down to the tenth wicket partnership. When the tenth wicket has fallen, there is no batsman left to partner so the innings is closed.

Wicket	Runs	First batsman	Second batsman	Opposition	Venue	Date
1st wicket	336	Kraigg Brathwaite	Tagenarine Chanderpaul	Zimbabwe	Queens Sports Club, Bulawayo, Zimbabwe	6 February 2023
2nd wicket	446	Conrad Hunte	Garfield Sobers	Pakistan	Sabina Park, Kingston, Jamaica	16 February 1958
3rd wicket	338	Everton Weekes	Frank Worrell	England	Queen's Sports Club, Port of Spain, Trinidad & Tobago	17 March 1954
4th wicket	399	Garfield Sobers	Frank Worrell	England	Kensington Oval, Bridgetown, Barbados	6 January 1960
5th wicket	322	Brian Lara	Jimmy Adams	Australia	Sabina Park, Kingston	13 March 1999
6th wicket	401	Amir Jangoo	Roston Chase	Sri Lanka	Sir Vivian Richards Stadium, North Sound, Antigua and Barbuda	25 June 2026
7th wicket	347 ♠	Denis Atkinson	Clairmonte Depeiaza	Australia	Sabina Park, Kingston	14 May 1955
8th wicket	212	Shane Dowrich†	Jason Holder†	Zimbabwe	Queens Sports Club, Bulawayo, Zimbabwe	29 October 2017
9th wicket	161	Clive Lloyd	Andy Roberts	India	Eden Gardens, Kolkata, India	10 December 1983
10th wicket	143	Denesh Ramdin	Tino Best	England	Edgbaston, Birmingham, England	7 June 2012
Last updated: 20 June 2020

=== Highest partnerships by runs ===
The highest Test partnership by runs for any wicket is held by the Sri Lankan pairing of Kumar Sangakkara and Mahela Jayawardene who put together a third wicket partnership of 624 runs during the first Test against South Africa in July 2006. This broke the record of 576 runs set by their compatriots Sanath Jayasuriya and Roshan Mahanama against India in 1997. West Indies' Conrad Hunte and Garfield Sobers hold the seventh highest Test partnership with 446 made in 1958 against Pakistan.

Wicket	Runs	First batsman	Second batsman	Opposition	Venue	Date
2nd wicket	446	Conrad Hunte	Garfield Sobers	Pakistan	Sabina Park, Kingston, Jamaica	16 February 1958
6th wicket	401	Amir Jangoo	Roston Chase	Sri Lanka	Sir Vivian Richards Stadium, North Sound, Antigua and Barbuda	25 June 2026
4th wicket	399	Frank Worrell	Garfield Sobers	England	Kensington Oval, Bridgetown, Barbados	6 January 1960
7th wicket	347 ♠	Denis Atkinson	Clairmonte Depeiaza	Australia	Sabina Park, Kingston	14 May 1955
3rd wicket	338	Everton Weekes	Frank Worrell	England	Queen's Sports Club, Port of Spain, Trinidad & Tobago	17 March 1954
Last updated: 7 July 2025

=== Highest overall partnership runs by a pair ===
Rank	Runs	Innings	Players	Highest	Average	100/50	T20I career span
1	6,482	148	Gordon Greenidge & Desmond Haynes	298	47.31	16/26	1978-1991
2	3,650	77	Desmond Haynes & Richie Richardson	297	52.14	11/16	1983-1994
3	3,198	58	Brian Lara & Ramnaresh Sarwan	232	55.13	12/8	2000-2006
4	2,621	57	Shivnarine Chanderpaul & Brian Lara	219	46.5	9/9	1994-2006
5	2,176	45	Conrad Hunte & Rohan Kanhai	163	50.6	5/14	1958-1967
An asterisk (*) signifies an unbroken partnership (i.e. neither of the batsmen was dismissed before either the end of the allotted overs or the required score being reached). Last updated: 11 October 2022

== Bowling records ==
=== Most career wickets ===
A bowler takes the wicket of a batsman when the form of dismissal is bowled, caught, leg before wicket, stumped or hit wicket. If the batsman is dismissed by run out, obstructing the field, handling the ball, hitting the ball twice or timed out the bowler does not receive credit.

West Indies' Courtney Walsh is the first fast bowler to take 500 Test wickets. He is sixth on the list of bowlers with most wickets, with 519 wickets. James Anderson of England is second on the list with 704 wickets as of July 2024.

Rank	Wickets	Player	Matches	Innings	Average	Period
1	519	Courtney Walsh	132	242	24.44	1984–2001
2	405	Curtly Ambrose	98	179	20.99	1988–2000
3	376	Malcolm Marshall	81	151	20.94	1978–1991
4	309	Lance Gibbs	79	148	29.09	1958–1976
5	284	Kemar Roach†	85	154	27.55	2009–2024
6	259	Joel Garner	58	111	20.97	1977–1987
7	249	Michael Holding	60	113	23.68	1975–1987
8	235	Gary Sobers	93	159	34.03	1954–1974
9	202	Andy Roberts	47	90	25.61	1974–1983
10	192	Wes Hall	48	92	26.38	1958–1969
Last updated: 25 January 2025

=== Most wickets against each team ===
Opposition	Wickets	Player	Matches	Innings	Average	Period	Ref
Afghanistan	10	Rahkeem Cornwall†	1	2	12.10	2019–2019	
Australia	135	Courtney Walsh	38	69	28.68	1984–2001	
Bangladesh	48	Kemar Roach†	12	22	20.10	2009–2024	
England	164	Curtly Ambrose	34	63	18.79	1988–2000	
India	76	Malcolm Marshall	17	30	21.98	1978–1989	
Ireland	YTP						
New Zealand	43	Courtney Walsh	10	19	21.93	1985–1999	
Pakistan	63	Courtney Walsh	18	31	23.04	1986–2000	
South Africa	51	Courtney Walsh	10	20	19.80	1992–2001	
Sri Lanka	38	Kemar Roach†	12	21	25.31	2010–2026	
Zimbabwe	19	Shane Shillingford	2	4	10.52	2013–2013	
Zimbabwe	19	Gudakesh Motie†	2	4	13.63	2023–2023	
Last updated: 28 November 2024

=== Fastest wicket taker ===
Wickets	Bowler	Match	Record Date	Reference
50	Alf Valentine	8	31 December 1951	
100	Alf Valentine	19	24 February 1954	
100	Andy Roberts	19	22 July 1976	
150	Andy Roberts	33	5 June 1980	
200	Malcolm Marshall	42	7 March 1986	
250	Malcolm Marshall	53	22 April 1988	
300	Malcolm Marshall	61	24 December 1988	
350	Malcolm Marshall	75	19 April 1991	
400	Curtly Ambrose	97	17 August 2000	
450	Courtney Walsh	118	15 June 2000	
500	Courtney Walsh	129	17 March 2001	
Last updated: 20 June 2020

=== Best career average ===
A bowler's bowling average is the total number of runs they have conceded divided by the number of wickets they have taken. Nineteenth century English medium pacer George Lohmann holds the record for the best career average in Test cricket with 10.75. J. J. Ferris, one of fifteen cricketers to have played Test cricket for more than one team, is second behind Lohmann with an overall career average of 12.70 runs per wicket.

Rank	Average	Player	Wickets	Runs	Balls	Period
1	20.94	Malcolm Marshall	376	7,876	17,584	1978–1991
2	20.97	Joel Garner	259	5,433	13,169	1977–1987
3	20.99	Curtly Ambrose	405	8,501	22,103	1988–2000
4	22.32	Jayden Seales	88	1,965	3,464	2021–2025
5	23.30	Colin Croft	125	2,913	6,615	1977–1982
Qualification: 2,000 balls. Last updated: 14 July 2025

=== Best career economy rate ===
A bowler's economy rate is the total number of runs they have conceded divided by the number of overs they have bowled. English bowler William Attewell, who played 10 matches for England between 1884 and 1892, holds the Test record for the best career economy rate with 1.31. West Indies's Gerry Gomez, with a rate of 1.82 runs per over conceded over his 29-match Test career, is ninth on the list.

Rank	Economy rate	Player	Wickets	Runs	Balls	Period
1	1.82	Gerry Gomez	58	1,590	5,236	1939–1954
2	1.90	Denis Atkinson	47	1,647	5,201	1948–1958
3	1.95	Alf Valentine	139	4,215	12,953	1950–1962
4	1.97	Sonny Ramadhin	158	4,579	13,939	1950–1961
5	1.98	Lance Gibbs	309	8,989	27,115	1958–1976
Qualification: 2,000 balls. Last updated: 14 July 2025

=== Best career strike rate ===
A bowler's strike rate is the total number of balls they have bowled divided by the number of wickets they have taken. As with the career average above, the top bowler with the best Test career strike rate is George Lohmann with strike rate of 34.1 balls per wicket. West Indies's Jayden Seales is at 9th position in this list.

Rank	Strike rate	Player	Wickets	Runs	Balls	Period
1	39.36	Jayden Seales	88	1,965	3,464	2021–2025
2	46.35	Jermaine Lawson	51	1,512	2,364	2002–2005
3	46.76	Malcolm Marshall	376	7,876	17,584	1978–1991
4	49.32	Colin Croft	125	2,913	6,615	1977–1982
5	50.84	Joel Garner	259	5,433	13,169	1977–1987
Qualification: 2,000 balls. Last updated: 14 July 2025

=== Most five-wicket hauls in an innings ===
A five-wicket haul refers to a bowler taking five wickets in a single innings. Malcolm Marshall, Curtly Ambrose and Courtney Walsh are joint-17th on the list of most five-wicket hauls in Test cricket.

Rank	Five-wicket hauls	Player	Innings	Balls	Wickets	Period
1	22	Malcolm Marshall	151	17,584	376	1978–1991
1	22	Curtly Ambrose	179	22,103	405	1988–2000
1	22	Courtney Walsh	242	30,019	519	1984–2001
4	18	Lance Gibbs	148	27,715	309	1958–1976
5	13	Michael Holding	113	12,680	249	1976–1987
Last updated: 20 June 2020

=== Most ten-wicket hauls in a match ===
A ten-wicket haul refers to a bowler taking ten or more wickets in a match over two innings. As with the five-wicket hauls above, Marshall is the highest West Indian in taking the most ten-wicket hauls in Test cricket.

Rank	Ten-wicket hauls	Player	Matches	Balls	Wickets	Period
1	4	Malcolm Marshall	81	17,584,850	376	1978–1991
2	3	Curtly Ambrose	98	22,103	405	1988–2000
2	3	Courtney Walsh	132	30,019	519	1984–2001
4	2	Alf Valentine	36	12,953	139	1950–1962
4	2	Lance Gibbs	79	27,715	309	1958–1976
4	2	Andy Roberts	47	11,135	202	1974–1983
4	2	Michael Holding	60	12,680	249	1976–1987
4	2	Shane Shillingford	16	4,694	70	2010–2014
Last updated: 20 June 2020

=== Most wickets in a series ===
England's seventh Test tour of South Africa in 1913–14 saw the record set for the most wickets taken by a bowler in a Test series. English paceman Sydney Barnes played in four of the five matches and achieved a total of 49 wickets to his name. West Indies's Malcolm Marshall is joint 18th with his 35 wickets taken against England during the 1988 tour.

Rank	Wickets	Player	Matches	Series
1	35	Malcolm Marshall	5	West Indian cricket team in England in 1988
2	34	Courtney Walsh	5	West Indian cricket team in England in 2000
3	33	Alf Valentine	4	West Indian cricket team in England in 1950
3	33	Colin Croft	5	Pakistani cricket team in the West Indies in 1976-77
3	33	Malcolm Marshall	6	West Indian cricket team in India in 1983-84
3	33	Curtly Ambrose	4	West Indian cricket team in Australia in 1992-93
Last updated: 20 June 2020

=== Best figures in an innings ===
Bowling figures refers to the number of the wickets a bowler has taken and the number of runs conceded. There have been two occasions in Test cricket where a bowler has taken all ten wickets in a single innings – Jim Laker of England took 10/53 against Australia in 1956 and India's Anil Kumble in 1999 returned figures of 10/74 against Pakistan. Jack Noreiga is one of 15 bowlers who have taken nine wickets in a Test match innings.

Rank	Figures	Player	Opposition	Venue	Date
1	9/95	Jack Noreiga	India	Queen's Park Oval, Port of Spain, Trinidad & Tobago	6 March 1971
2	8/29	Colin Croft	Pakistan	Queen's Park Oval, Port of Spain, Trinidad & Tobago	4 March 1977
3	8/38	Lance Gibbs	India	Kensington Oval, Bridgetown, Barbados	23 March 1962
4	8/45	Curtly Ambrose	England	Kensington Oval, Bridgetown, Barbados	5 April 1990
5	8/49	Devendra Bishoo	Pakistan	Dubai International Cricket Stadium, Dubai, UAE	13 October 2016
Last updated: 20 June 2020

=== Best bowling figures against each team ===
Opposition	Figures	Player	Venue	Date	Ref
Afghanistan	7/75	Rahkeem Cornwall	Ekana International Cricket Stadium, Lucknow, India	27 November 2019	
Australia	7/25	Curtly Ambrose	Western Australia Cricket Association Ground, Perth, Australia	30 January 1993	
Bangladesh	6/3	Jermaine Lawson	Bangabandhu National Stadium, Dhaka, Bangladesh	8 December 2002	
England	8/45	Curtly Ambrose	Kensington Oval, Barbados, West Indies	5 April 1990	
India	9/95	Jack Noreiga	Port Of Spain, Trinidad, West Indies	6 March 1971	
Ireland	YTP				
New Zealand	7/37	Courtney Walsh	Basin Reserve, Wellington, New Zealand	10 February 1995	
Pakistan	8/29	Colin Croft	Port Of Spain, Trinidad, West Indies	4 March 1977	
South Africa	7/84	Franklyn Rose	Kingsmead, Durban, South Africa	26 December 1998	
Sri Lanka	8/62	Shannon Gabriel	Beausejour Stadium, St Lucia, West Indies	14 June 2018	
Zimbabwe	7/37	Gudakesh Motie	Queens Sports Club, Bulawayo, Zimbabwe	12 February 2023	
Last updated: 7 July 2025

=== Best figures in a match ===
A bowler's bowling figures in a match is the sum of the wickets taken and the runs conceded over both innings.

No bowler in the history of Test cricket has taken all 20 wickets in a match. The closest to do so was English spin bowler Jim Laker. During the fourth Test of the 1956 Ashes series, Laker took 9/37 in the first innings and 10/53 in the second to finish with match figures of 19/90. Michael Holding's figures of 14/149, taken during the fifth match of the West Indies tour of England in 1976, is the 19th-best in Test cricket history.

Rank	Figures	Player	Opposition	Venue	Date
1	14/149	Michael Holding	England	Kennington Oval, London, England	12 August 1976
2	13/55	Courtney Walsh	New Zealand	Basin Reserve, Wellington, New Zealand	10 February 1995
3	13/99	Gudakesh Motie	Zimbabwe	Queens Sports Club, Bulawayo, Zimbabwe	12 February 2023
4	13/121	Shannon Gabriel†	Sri Lanka	Darren Sammy National Cricket Stadium, Gros Islet, Saint Lucia	14 June 2018
5	12/121	Andy Roberts	India	M. A. Chidambaram Stadium, Chennai, India	11 January 1975
Last updated: 7 July 2025

=== Worst figures in an innings ===
The worst figures in a single innings in Test cricket came in the third Test between the West Indies at home to Pakistan in 1958. Pakistan's Khan Mohammad returned figures of 0/259 from his 54 overs in the second innings of the match. The worst figures by a West Indian is 0/148 that came off the bowling of Shannon Gabriel in the first test of the West Indies's tour of New Zealand in 2013.

Rank	Figures	Player	Overs	Opposition	Venue	Date
1	0/148	Shannon Gabriel†	27.5	New Zealand	University Oval, Dunedin, New Zealand	3 December 2013
2	0/143	Sonny Ramadhin	41	Australia	Sydney Cricket Ground, Sydney, Australia	30 November 1951
2	0/143	Sulieman Benn	39	England	Antigua Recreation Ground, St. John's, Antigua and Barbuda	15 February 2009
4	0/140	Roston Chase	31	Australia	Perth Stadium, Perth, Australia	30 November 2022
5	0/137	Denis Atkinson	72	England	Edgbaston, Birmingham, England	30 May 1957
5	0/137	Rajindra Dhanraj	40	England	Trent Bridge, Nottingham, England	10 August 1995
Last updated: 14 July 2025

=== Worst figures in a match ===
The worst figures in a match in Test cricket were returned by South Africa's Imran Tahir in the second Test against Australia at the Adelaide Oval in November 2012. He had figures of 0/180 off his 23 overs in the first innings and 0/80 off his 14 overs in the third innings, for a total of 0/260 from 37 overs.

The worst figures by a West Indian is by Rajindra Dhanraj in the fifth test of the West Indies's tour of England in 1995.

Rank	Figures	Player	Overs	Opposition	Venue	Date
1	0/191	Rajindra Dhanraj	55	England	Trent Bridge, Nottingham, England	10 August 1995
2	0/169	Charlie Griffith	42	Australia	Kensington Oval, Bridgetown, Barbados	5 May 1965
3	0/164	Shannon Gabriel†	32.5	New Zealand	University Oval, Dunedin, New Zealand	3 December 2013
3	0/164	Rahkeem Cornwall	46	England	Old Trafford, Manchester, England	24 July 2020
5	0/160	Jomel Warrican	34	Australia	Melbourne Cricket Ground, Melbourne, Australia	26 December 2015
Last updated:20 June 2020

=== Hat-trick ===
In cricket, a hat-trick occurs when a bowler takes three wickets with consecutive deliveries. The deliveries may be interrupted by an over bowled by another bowler from the other end of the pitch or the other team's innings, but must be three consecutive deliveries by the individual bowler in the same match. Only wickets attributed to the bowler count towards a hat-trick; run outs do not count. In Test cricket history there have been just 44 hat-tricks, the first achieved by Fred Spofforth for Australia against England in 1879. In 1912, Australian Jimmy Matthews achieved the feat twice in one game against South Africa. The only other players to achieve two hat-tricks are Australia's Hugh Trumble, against England in 1902 and 1904, Pakistan's Wasim Akram, in separate games against Sri Lanka in 1999, and England's Stuart Broad.

No.	Bowler	Against	Inn.	Test	Dismissals	Venue	Date	Ref.
1	Wes Hall	Pakistan	1	3/3	Mushtaq Mohammed (lbw); Fazal Mahmood (c Garfield Sobers); Nasim-ul-Ghani (b)	(Pakistan) Bagh-e-Jinnah, Lahore	29 March 1959	
2	Lance Gibbs	Australia	1	4/5	Ken Mackay (lbw); Wally Grout (c Garfield Sobers); Frank Misson (b)	(Australia) Adelaide Oval, Adelaide	30 January 1961	
3	Courtney Walsh	Australia	1 & 2	1/5	Tony Dodemaide (c Viv Richards); Mike Veletta (c Carl Hooper); Graeme Wood (lbw)	(Australia) The Gabba, Brisbane	18–20 November 1988	
4	Jermaine Lawson	Australia	1 & 2	3/4	Brett Lee (b); Stuart MacGill (b); Justin Langer (lbw)	(Barbados) Kensington Oval, Bridgetown	2–5 May 2003	

== Wicket-keeping records ==
The wicket-keeper is a specialist fielder who stands behind the stumps being guarded by the batsman on strike and is the only member of the fielding side allowed to wear gloves and leg pads.

=== Most career dismissals ===
A wicket-keeper can be credited with the dismissal of a batsman in two ways, caught or stumped. A fair catch is taken when the ball is caught fully within the field of play without it bouncing after the ball has touched the striker's bat or glove holding the bat, while a stumping occurs when the wicket-keeper puts down the wicket while the batsman is out of his ground and not attempting a run. The West Indies's Jeff Dujon is seventh in taking most dismissals in Test cricket as a designated wicket-keeper.

Rank	Dismissals	Player	Matches	Period
1	270	Jeff Dujon	81	1981–1991
2	219	Ridley Jacobs	65	1998–2004
3	217	Denesh Ramdin	74	2005–2016
4	189	Deryck Murray	62	1963–1980
5	127	Joshua Da Silva †	33	2020–2024
Last updated: 21 March 2026

=== Most career catches ===
Dujon is fifth in taking most catches in Test cricket as a designated wicket-keeper.

Rank	Catches	Player	Matches	Period
1	265	Jeff Dujon	81	1981–1991
2	207	Ridley Jacobs	65	1998–2004
3	205	Denesh Ramdin	74	2005–2016
4	181	Deryck Murray	62	1963–1980
5	121	Joshua Da Silva †	33	2020–2024
Last updated: 21 March 2026

=== Most career stumpings ===
Bert Oldfield, Australia's fifth-most capped wicket-keeper, holds the record for the most stumpings in Test cricket with 52. Ridley Jacobs and Denesh Ramdin have the most stumpings among the West Indians with 12.

Rank	Stumpings	Player	Matches	Period
1	12	Ridley Jacobs	65	1998–2004
1	12	Denesh Ramdin	74	2005–2016
3	11	Clyde Walcott	44	1948–1960
4	8	Deryck Murray	62	1963–1980
5	6	Joshua Da Silva †	33	2020–2024
Last updated: 21 March 2026

=== Most dismissals in a series ===
Brad Haddin holds the Test cricket record for the most dismissals taken by a wicket-keeper in a series. He took 29 catches during the 2013 Ashes series. The West Indian record is held by Deryck Murray when he made 24 dismissals against England in 1963.

Rank	Dismissals	Player	Matches	Innings	Series
1	24	Deryck Murray	5	10	West Indian cricket team in England in 1963
2	23	Jeff Dujon	5	9	Australian cricket team in the West Indies in 1990–91
2	23	Gerry Alexander	5	10	English cricket team in the West Indies in 1959-60
4	21	Ridley Jacobs	5	8	West Indian cricket team in Australia in 2000-01
4	21	Ridley Jacobs	5	9	West Indian cricket team in England in 2000
4	21	Ridley Jacobs	5	10	South African cricket team in West Indies in 2000-01
Last updated: 21 March 2026

=== Most dismissals in an innings ===
Five wicket-keepers have taken seven dismissals in a single innings in a Test, including Ridley Jacobs and Joshua Da Silva of the West Indies.

Rank	Dismissals	Player	Opposition	Venue	Date
1	7	Ridley Jacobs	Australia	Melbourne Cricket Ground, Melbourne, Australia	26 December 2000
1	7	Joshua Da Silva †	South Africa	Centurion Park, Centurion, South Africa	28 February 2023
3	5	11 players on 19 occasions			
Last updated: 21 March 2026

=== Most dismissals in a match ===
Three wicket-keepers have made 11 dismissals in a Test match. David Murray, Courtney Browne and Ridley Jacobs have made nine dismissals in a match, the most among the West Indians.

Rank	Dismissals	Player	Opposition	Venue	Date
1	9	David Murray	Australia	Melbourne Cricket Ground, Melbourne, Australia	26 December 1981
1	9	Courtney Browne	England	Trent Bridge, Nottingham, England	10 August 1995
1	9	Ridley Jacobs	Australia	Melbourne Cricket Ground, Melbourne, Australia	26 December 2000
4	8	Junior Murray	Australia	WACA Ground, Perth, Australia	30 January 1993
4	8	Joshua Da Silva †	Pakistan	Sabina Park, Kingston, Jamaica	12 August 2021
Last updated: 21 March 2026

== Fielding records ==
=== Most career catches ===
Caught is one of the nine methods a batsman can be dismissed in cricket. (Note: In 2017, The Laws of Cricket were amended, reducing the methods of dismissals from ten to nine, with handled the ball now covered as part of obstructing the field.) The majority of catches are caught in the slips, located behind the batsman, next to the wicket-keeper, on the off side of the field. Most slip fielders are top order batsmen.

India's Rahul Dravid holds the record for the most catches in Test cricket by a non-wicket-keeper with 209, followed by Mahela Jayawardene of Sri Lanka on 205 and South African Jacques Kallis with 200. Brian Lara is the highest ranked West Indian in ninth, securing 164 catches in his Test career.

Rank	Catches	Player	Matches	Period
1	164	Brian Lara	130	1990–2006
2	122	Viv Richards	121	1974–1991
3	115	Carl Hooper	102	1987–2002
4	109	Gary Sobers	93	1954–1974
5	96	Gordon Greenidge	108	1974–1991
5	96	Chris Gayle	103	2000–2014
Last updated: 20 June 2020

=== Most catches in a series ===
The 1920–21 Ashes series, in which Australia whitewashed England 5–0 for the first time, saw the record set for the most catches taken by a non-wicket-keeper in a Test series. Australian all-rounder Jack Gregory took 15 catches in the series as well as 23 wickets. Greg Chappell, a fellow Australian all-rounder, and India's K. L. Rahul are equal second behind Gregory with 14 catches taken during the 1974–75 Ashes series and during the 2018 Indian tour of England respectively. Four players have taken 13 catches in a series on six occasions with both Bob Simpson and Brian Lara having done so twice and Rahul Dravid and Alastair Cook once.

Rank	Catches	Player	Matches	Innings	Series
1	13	Brian Lara	6	11	English cricket team in the West Indies in 1997-98
1	13	Brian Lara	4	7	Indian cricket team in the West Indies in 2006
3	12	Gary Sobers	5	10	West Indian cricket team in Australia in 1960-61
4	11	Everton Weekes	4	8	West Indian cricket team in England in 1950
4	11	Gary Sobers	5	10	Indian cricket team in the West Indies in 1961-62
Last updated: 20 June 2020

== All-round Records ==
=== 1000 runs and 100 wickets ===
A total of 71 players have achieved the double of 1000 runs and 100 wickets in their Test career.

Rank	Player	Average Difference	Matches	Runs	Bat Avg	Wickets	Bowl Avg	Period
1	Garfield Sobers	23.74	93	8,032	57.78	235	34.03	1954–1974
2	Jason Holder†	0.22	64	2,797	29.44	157	29.21	2014–2023
3	Malcolm Marshall	-2.09	81	1810	18.85	376	20.94	1978–1991
4	Curtly Ambrose	-8.58	98	1439	12.40	405	20.99	1988–2000
5	Carl Hooper	-12.96	102	5762	36.46	114	49.42	1987–2002
6	Kemar Roach	-16.12	67	1021	11.87	231	27.05	2009–2024
Last updated: 19 January 2024

=== 250 runs and 20 wickets in a series ===
A total of 18 players on 24 occasions have achieved the double of 250 runs and 20 wickets in a series.

Player	Matches	Runs	Wickets	Series
Garfield Sobers	5	424	23	India in West Indies in 1961-62
Garfield Sobers	5	322	20	West Indies in England in 1963
Garfield Sobers	5	722	20	West Indies in England in 1966
Last updated: 22 August 2020

== Other records ==
=== Most career matches ===
India's Sachin Tendulkar holds the record for the most Test matches played with 200, with former captain Shivnarine Chanderpaul being joint fifth having represented West Indies on 164 occasions.

Rank	Matches	Player	Runs	Wkts	Period
1	164	Shivnarine Chanderpaul	11,867	9	1994-2015
2	132	Courtney Walsh	936	519	1984-2001
3	130	Brian Lara	11,912	-	1990–2006
4	121	Viv Richards	8,540	32	1974–1991
5	116	Desmond Haynes	7,487	1	1978–1994
Last updated: 20 June 2020

=== Most consecutive career matches ===
Former English captain Alastair Cook holds the record for the most consecutive Test matches played with 159. He broke Allan Border's long standing record of 153 matches in June 2018. Kraigg Brathwaite played 90 consecutive Test matches, is 11th and the highest ranked West Indies player to achieve the feat.

Rank	Matches	Player	Period
1	90	Kraigg Brathwaite	2014–2025
2	85	Gary Sobers	1955–1972
3	72	Desmond Haynes	1979–1988
4	64	Brian Lara	1992–1999
5	61	Rohan Kanhai	1957-1969
5	61	Viv Richards	1980–1989
Last updated: 7 July 2025

=== Most matches as captain ===
Graeme Smith, who led the South African cricket team from 2003 to 2014, holds the record for the most matches played as captain in Test cricket with 109.Clive Lloyd captained the West Indies between 1974 and 1985 and oversaw their rise to become the dominant Test-playing nation, a position that was only relinquished in the latter half of the 1990s is fifth on the list with 60 matches.

Rank	Matches	Player	Won	Lost	Tied	Draw	%W	%L	Period
1	74	Clive Lloyd	36	12	0	26	48.64	16.21	1974-1985
2	50	Viv Richards	27	8	0	15	54.00	16.00	1980–1991
3	47	Brian Lara	10	26	0	11	21.27	55.31	1997–2006
5	39	Kraigg Brathwaite	10	22	0	7	25.64	56.41	2017–2025
5	39	Gary Sobers	9	10	0	20	23.07	25.64	1965–1972
Last updated: 7 July 2025

=== Most man of the match awards ===
Rank	M.O.M. Awards	Player	Matches	Period
1	14	Curtly Ambrose	98	1988–2000
2	12	Brian Lara	130	1990–2006
3	11	Shivnarine Chanderpaul	164	1994–2015
4	10	Malcolm Marshall	81	1978–1991
4	10	Viv Richards	121	1974–1991
Last updated: 26 January 2024

=== Most man of the series awards ===
Rank	M.O.S. Awards	Player	Matches	Period
1	7	Shivnarine Chanderpaul	164	1994–2015
2	6	Malcolm Marshall	81	1978–1991
2	6	Curtly Ambrose	98	1988–2000
4	4	Brian Lara	130	1990–2006
5	3	Kemar Roach†	81	2009–2024
5	3	Ramnaresh Sarwan	87	2000–2011
Last updated: 26 January 2024

=== Youngest players on Debut ===
The youngest player to play in a Test match is claimed to be Hasan Raza at the age of 14 years and 227 days, though there is some doubt as to the validity of Raza's age at the time.

Rank	Age	Player	Opposition	Venue	Date
1	17 years and 122 days	Derek Sealy	England	Kensington Oval, Bridgetown, Barbados	11 January 1930
2	17 years and 245 days	Gary Sobers	England	Sabina Park, Kingston, Jamaica	30 March 1954
3	18 years and 31 days	Robin Bynoe	Pakistan	Bagh-e-Jinnah, Lahore, England	28 April 1983
4	18 years and 105 days	Jeff Stollmeyer	England	Lord's, London, England	24 June 1939
5	18 years and 170 days	Kraigg Brathwaite	Pakistan	Warner Park, St. Kitts, St. Kitts and Nevis	20 May 2011
Last updated: 3 December 2017

=== Oldest players on Debut ===
England left-arm slow bowler James Southerton is the oldest player to appear in a Test match. Playing in the very first inaugural test against Australia in 1876 at Melbourne Cricket Ground, in Melbourne, Australia, he was aged 49 years and 119 days. Nelson Betancourt is the oldest West Indian Test debutant when he played his only game during the second Test of the 1929–30 series at the Queen's Park Oval, Port of Spain.

Rank	Age	Player	Opposition	Venue	Date
1	42 years and 242 days	Nelson Betancourt	England	Queen's Park Oval, Port of Spain, Trinidad & Tobago	1 February 1930
2	40 years and 345 days	Archie Wiles	England	Old Trafford Cricket Ground, Manchester, England	22 July 1933
3	39 years and 361 days	George Challenor	England	Lord's, London, England	23 June 1928
4	39 years and 306 days	Berkeley Gaskin	England	Kensington Oval, Bridgetown, Barbados	21 January 1948
5	37 years and 259 days	Snuffy Browne	England	Lord's, London, England	23 June 1928
Last updated: 20 June 2020

=== Oldest players ===
England all-rounder Wilfred Rhodes is the oldest player to appear in a Test match. Playing in the fourth Test against the West Indies in 1930 at Sabina Park, in Kingston, Jamaica, he was aged 52 years and 165 days on the final day's play. The oldest West Indian Test player is George Headley who was aged 44 years and 230 days when he represented West Indies for the final time in the 1954 tour by England at Sabina Park.

Rank	Age	Player	Opposition	Venue	Date
1	44 years and 230 days	George Headley	England	Sabina Park, Kingston, Jamaica	15 January 1954
2	42 years and 242 days	Nelson Betancourt	England	Queen's Park Oval, Port of Spain, Trinidad & Tobago	1 February 1930
3	41 years and 124 days	Lance Gibbs	Australia	Melbourne Cricket Ground, Melbourne, Australia	31 January 1976
4	40 years and 345 days	Archie Wiles	England	Old Trafford Cricket Ground, Manchester, England	22 July 1933
5	40 years and 258 days	Shivnarine Chanderpaul	England	Kensington Oval, Bridgetown, Barbados	1 May 2015
Last updated: 28 January 2021

== Umpiring records ==
=== Most matches umpired ===
An umpire in cricket is a person who officiates the match according to the Laws of Cricket. Two umpires adjudicate the match on the field, whilst a third umpire has access to video replays, and a fourth umpire looks after the match balls and other duties. The records below are only for on-field umpires.

Aleem Dar of Pakistan holds the record for the most Test matches umpired with 130. The current active Dar set the record in December 2019 overtaking Steve Bucknor from the West Indies mark of 128 matches. They are followed by South Africa's Rudi Koertzen who officiated in 108.

Rank	Matches	Umpire	Period
1	128	Steve Bucknor	1989–2009
2	47	Joel Wilson	2015–2025
3	38	Billy Doctrove	2000–2012
4	31	Douglas Sang Hue	1985–1999
5	29	Lloyd Barker	1984–1997
Last updated: 7 July 2025

== See also ==
- Cricket statistics
- List of Test cricket records
