= West Indies A cricket team in South Africa in 2023–24 =

International cricket tour

West Indies A cricket team in South Africa in 2023-24
| | South Africa A | West Indies A |
- Dates: 21 November – 8 December 2023
| Captains | Neil Brand | Joshua Da Silva |

FC series
- Result: South Africa A won the 3-match series 2–1
| Most runs | Keegan Petersen (247) | Kevin Sinclair (220) |
| Most wickets | Dane Piedt (15) | Shamar Joseph (12); Kevin Sinclair (12) |

The West Indies A cricket team toured South Africa in November 2023 to play the South Africa A cricket team.

== Squads ==
| South Africa A | (Cricket West Indies) West Indies A |
|---|---|
| Neil Brand (c); David Bedingham; Ruan de Swardt; Tony de Zorzi; Clyde Fortuin; Zubayr Hamza; Tshepo Moreki; Mihlali Mpongwana; Duanne Olivier; Dane Paterson; Keegan Petersen; Dane Piedt; Raynard van Tonder; Hardus Viljoen; Khaya Zondo | Joshua Da Silva (c); Tevin Imlach (vc); Tagenarine Chanderpaul; Kavem Hodge; Jordan Johnson; Akeem Jordan; Shamar Joseph; Shermon Lewis; Jair McAllister; Zachary McCaskie; Kirk McKenzie; Abhijai Mansingh; Jayden Seales; Kevin Sinclair |

== First-class series ==
=== 1st Unofficial Test ===
21–24 November 2023
Scorecard

| South Africa A | v | (Cricket West Indies) West Indies A |
| 287/9d (78.5 overs); Keegan Petersen 59 (91); Jayden Seales 3/23 (15.5 overs) | | 314/9d (93.2 overs); Tagenarine Chanderpaul 78 (150); Tshepo Moreki 3/56 (19 overs) |
| 250 (79.5 overs); Neil Brand 104 (219); Akeem Jordan 3/58 (22 overs) | | 224/9 (80.4 overs); Kevin Sinclair 80* (150); Mihlali Mpongwana 3/25 (14 overs) |

West Indies A won by 1 wickets
Willowmoore Park, Benoni
Umpires: Siphelele Gasa (SA) and Arno Jacobs (SA)
Player of the match: Kevin Sinclair (West Indies A)

- South Africa A won the toss and elected to bat.

=== 2nd Unofficial Test ===
28 November–1 December 2023
Scorecard

| South Africa A | v | (Cricket West Indies) West Indies A |
| 298 (97.2 overs); Keegan Petersen 67 (124); Akeem Jordan 3/43 (23.2 overs) | | 154 (47.2 overs); Zachary McCaskie 62 (95); Dane Piedt 5/28 (12.2 overs) |
| 297/4d (71.3 overs); Keegan Petersen 112* (134); Kevin Sinclair 1/51(15.3 overs) | | 209 (59.2 overs); Zachary McCaskie 50 (90); Dane Piedt 6/79 (23.2 overs) |

South Africa A won by 232 runs
Buffalo Park, East London
Umpires: Mazizi Gampu (SA) and Arno Jacobs (SA)

- West Indies A won the toss and elected to field.

=== 3rd Unofficial Test ===
5-8 December 2023
Scorecard

| South Africa A | v | (Cricket West Indies) West Indies A |
| 274 (67.4 overs); Khaya Zondo 70 (114); Kevin Sinclair 5/44 (14.4 overs) | | 126 (42.2 overs); Kevin Sinclair 50 (68); Dane Paterson 4/34 (13 overs) |
| 272/5d (66 overs); Zubayr Hamza 110* (152); Shamar Joseph 5/76 (18 overs) | | 344 (91.1 overs); Joshua Da Silva 110 (138); Dane Paterson 4/66 (20.1 overs) |

South Africa A won by 76 runs
Mangaung Oval, Bloemfontein
Umpires: Arno Jacobs (SA) and Siphelele Gasa (SA)

- South Africa A won the toss and elected to bat.
- Jordan Johnson (West Indies A) made his first-class debut.
