= West Indian cricket team in Australia in 2022–23 =

International cricket tour

	Australia	West Indies
- Dates: 5 October – 12 December 2022
Captains	Pat Cummins (Note: Steve Smith captained Australia in the second Test.) (Tests); Aaron Finch (T20Is)	Kraigg Brathwaite (Tests); Nicholas Pooran (T20Is)

Test series
- Result: Australia won the 2-match series 2–0
Most runs	Marnus Labuschagne (502)	Kraigg Brathwaite (196)
Most wickets	Nathan Lyon (12)	Alzarri Joseph (5)
- Player of the series: Marnus Labuschagne (Aus)

Twenty20 International series
- Results: Australia won the 2-match series 2–0
Most runs	David Warner (89)	Kyle Mayers (45)
Most wickets	Mitchell Starc (6)	Alzarri Joseph (5)
- Player of the series: David Warner (Aus)

The West Indian cricket team toured Australia from October to December 2022 to play two Test matches and two Twenty20 Internationals (T20Is). The T20Is formed part of both teams' preparations for the 2022 ICC Men's T20 World Cup, while the Test matches formed part of the 2021–2023 ICC World Test Championship. In May 2022, Cricket Australia confirmed the fixtures for the tour.

Australia won the T20I series 2–0, and the Test series 2–0, retaining the Frank Worrell Trophy in the process.

Marnus Labuschagne scored 502 runs in the Test series, the most by any Australian in a two-Test series, surpassing Matthew Hayden's 501 against Zimbabwe in 2003–04.

== Background ==
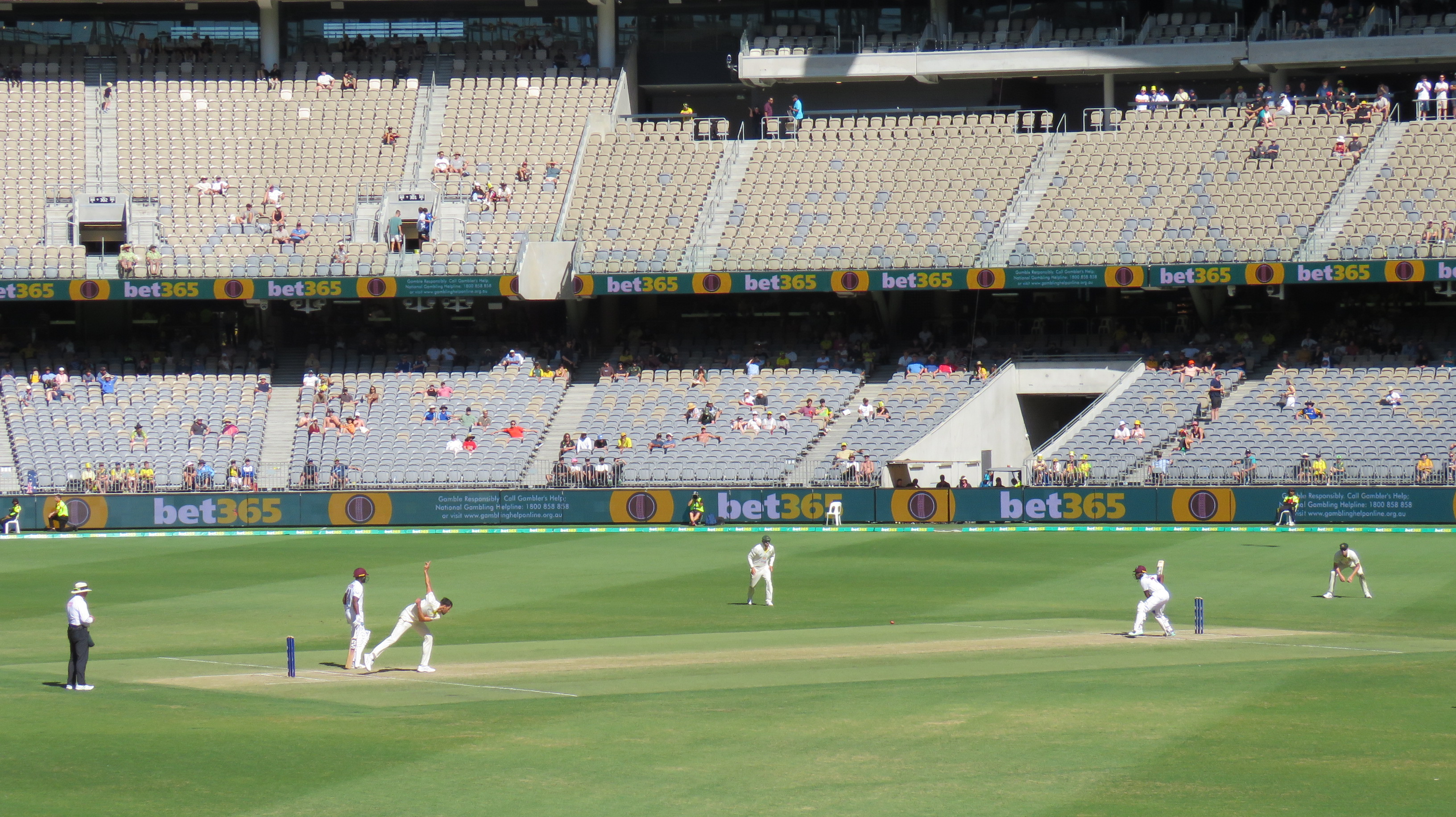
The wicket of Jermaine Blackwood, bowled by Mitchell Starc, during the first innings of the first test at Perth Stadium, 2 December 2022

Originally, the tour was scheduled to take place in October 2020, however, on 28 May 2020, Cricket Australia confirmed the fixtures for the series. Originally, the matches would have been used as warm-up fixtures for the 2020 ICC Men's T20 World Cup. However, in July 2020, the International Cricket Council (ICC) postponed the T20 World Cup until 2021 due to the COVID-19 pandemic. In August 2020, the three T20I matches were also postponed due to the pandemic, and a fixture clash with the revised schedule for the 2020 Indian Premier League.

== Squads ==
Tests		T20Is	
Australia	West Indies	Australia	West Indies
Pat Cummins (c); Steve Smith (vc); Scott Boland; Alex Carey (wk); Cameron Green; Marcus Harris; Josh Hazlewood; Travis Head; Usman Khawaja; Marnus Labuschagne; Nathan Lyon; Lance Morris; Michael Neser; Mitchell Starc; David Warner	Kraigg Brathwaite (c); Jermaine Blackwood (vc); Nkrumah Bonner; Shamarh Brooks; Tagenarine Chanderpaul; Roston Chase; Joshua Da Silva (wk); Jason Holder; Alzarri Joseph; Kyle Mayers; Marquino Mindley; Anderson Phillip; ~~Raymon Reifer~~; Kemar Roach; Jayden Seales; Devon Thomas (wk)	Aaron Finch (c); Sean Abbott; Pat Cummins; Tim David; Cameron Green; Josh Hazlewood; Josh Inglis (wk); Mitchell Marsh; Glenn Maxwell; Daniel Sams; Steve Smith; Mitchell Starc; ~~Marcus Stoinis~~; Matthew Wade (wk); David Warner; Adam Zampa	Nicholas Pooran (c, wk); Rovman Powell (vc); Shamarh Brooks; Yannic Cariah; Johnson Charles (wk); Sheldon Cottrell; ~~Shimron Hetmyer~~; Jason Holder; Akeal Hosein; Alzarri Joseph; Brandon King; Evin Lewis; Kyle Mayers; Obed McCoy; Raymon Reifer; Odean Smith

Shimron Hetmyer was ruled out after missing his flight to Australia and was replaced by Shamarh Brooks. Marcus Stoinis was ruled out due to an injury. On 6 October 2022, Cricket Australia announced that Mitchell Marsh would miss the second T20I due to a concern over his ankle injury. Before the start of the first Test, Raymon Reifer was ruled out of West Indies' Test squad due to a groin injury. Ahead of the second Test, Lance Morris and Michael Neser were added to Australia's test squad, whereas Marquino Mindley was added to the West Indies' test squad.

Australia's Pat Cummins was ruled out of second test after not recovering from the quad strain he picked up in the first test, with Steve Smith was named captain for the match.

== Warm-up matches ==
17–19 November 2022
Scorecard

West Indies	v	Combined NSW and ACT XI
9/424d (120 overs); Devon Thomas 77* (79); Riley Ayre 3/132 (37 overs)		4/426d (97 overs); Blake Macdonald 177* (265); Raymon Reifer 1/22 (4 overs)
4/114 (28 overs); Devon Thomas 35 (51); Riley Ayre 1/13 (5 overs)

Match drawn
Phillip Oval, Canberra
Umpires: Stephen Dionysius (Aus) and David Taylor (Aus)

- West Indies won the toss and elected to bat.

23–26 November 2022 (D/N)
Scorecard

Prime Minister's XI (Australia)	v	West Indies
322 (91.5 overs); Matt Renshaw 81 (168); Alzarri Joseph 4/65 (19.5 overs)		235 (91.3 overs); Tagenarine Chanderpaul 119 (293); Todd Murphy 3/27 (22 overs)
4/221d (70 overs); Matt Renshaw 101* (218); Jayden Seales 1/28 (9 overs)		8/277 (106.5 overs); Tagenarine Chanderpaul 56 (138); Mark Steketee 3/56 (15 overs)

Match drawn
Manuka Oval, Canberra
Umpires: Phillip Gillespie (Aus) and Donovan Koch (Aus)
Player of the match: Tagenarine Chanderpaul (WI)

- Prime Minister's XI won the toss and elected to bat.

== T20I series ==
=== 1st T20I ===
5 October 2022
18:10 (N)
Scorecard

West Indies; 9/145 (20 overs)	v	Australia; 7/146 (19.5 overs)
Kyle Mayers 39 (36); Josh Hazlewood 3/35 (4 overs)		Aaron Finch 58 (53); Alzarri Joseph 2/17 (4 overs)

Australia won by 3 wickets
Carrara Stadium, Gold Coast
Umpires: Donovan Koch (Aus) and Sam Nogajski (Aus)
Player of the match: Aaron Finch (Aus)

- Australia won the toss and elected to field.
- Yannic Cariah and Raymon Reifer (WI) both made their T20I debuts.

=== 2nd T20I ===
7 October 2022
18:10 (N)
Scorecard

Australia; 7/178 (20 overs)	v	West Indies; 8/147 (20 overs)
David Warner 75 (41); Alzarri Joseph 3/21 (4 overs)		Johnson Charles 29 (30); Mitchell Starc 4/20 (4 overs)

Australia won by 31 runs
The Gabba, Brisbane
Umpires: Phillip Gillespie (Aus) and Sam Nogajski (Aus)
Player of the match: David Warner (Aus)

- West Indies won the toss and elected to field.

== Test series ==
=== 1st Test ===
30 November–4 December 2022
Scorecard

Australia	v	West Indies
4/598d (152.4 overs); Marnus Labuschagne 204 (350); Kraigg Brathwaite 2/65 (12.4 overs)		283 (98.2 overs); Kraigg Brathwaite 64 (166); Pat Cummins 3/34 (20.2 overs)
2/182d (37 overs); Marnus Labuschagne 104 (110); Kemar Roach 1/30 (7 overs)		333 (110.5 overs); Kraigg Brathwaite 110 (188); Nathan Lyon 6/128 (42.5 overs)

Australia won by 164 runs
Perth Stadium, Perth
Umpires: Richard Illingworth (Eng) and Rod Tucker (Aus)
Player of the match: Marnus Labuschagne (Aus)

- Australia won the toss and elected to bat.
- Tagenarine Chanderpaul (WI) made his Test debut.
- Pat Cummins (Aus) took his 200th Test wicket. The Australian XI thus became the first Test cricket team to feature four bowlers who have taken 200 wickets.
- Shamarh Brooks (WI) replaced Nkrumah Bonner as a concussion substitute on day 3.
- Mitchell Starc became the third player to dismiss a father-son duo in Test cricket when he dismissed Tagenarine Chanderpaul in the second innings.
- World Test Championship points: Australia 12, West Indies 0.

=== 2nd Test ===
8–12 December 2022 (Note: While five days of play were scheduled for each Test, the second Test reached a result in four days.) (D/N)
Scorecard

Australia	v	West Indies
7/511d (137 overs); Travis Head 175 (219); Devon Thomas 2/53 (14 overs)		214 (69.3 overs); Tagenarine Chanderpaul 47 (102); Nathan Lyon 3/57 (20 overs)
6/199d (31 overs); Usman Khawaja 45 (50); Alzarri Joseph 3/33 (7 overs)		77 (40.5 overs); Tagenarine Chanderpaul 17 (28); Scott Boland 3/16 (10 overs)

Australia won by 419 runs
Adelaide Oval, Adelaide
Umpires: Kumar Dharmasena (SL) and Rod Tucker (Aus)
Player of the match: Travis Head (Aus)

- Australia won the toss and elected to bat.
- Marquino Mindley and Devon Thomas (WI) both made their Test debuts.
- The final margin of 419 was, in terms of runs, Australia's fourth largest victory, and the West Indies' biggest defeat.
- Alex Carey's six catches in the second innings equalled the Australian record for most dismissals in an innings.
- Marnus Labuschagne completed 3000 Test runs, becoming the equal second fastest to do so.
- World Test Championship points: Australia 12, West Indies 0.
