= Indian cricket team in the West Indies and the United States in 2023 =

International cricket tour

Indian cricket team against the West Indies in 2023
	West Indies	India
- Dates: 12 July – 13 August
Captains	Kraigg Brathwaite (Tests); Shai Hope (ODIs); Rovman Powell (T20Is)	Rohit Sharma (Tests & ODIs) (Note: Hardik Pandya captained India in the second and the third ODIs.); Hardik Pandya (T20Is)

Test series
- Result: India won the 2-match series 1–0
Most runs	Kraigg Brathwaite (130)	Yashasvi Jaiswal (266)
Most wickets	Jomel Warrican (5)	Ravichandran Ashwin (15)

One Day International series
- Results: India won the 3-match series 2–1
Most runs	Shai Hope (111)	Ishan Kishan (184)
Most wickets	Gudakesh Motie (6)	Shardul Thakur (8)
- Player of the series: Ishan Kishan (Ind)

Twenty20 International series
- Results: West Indies won the 5-match series 3–2
Most runs	Nicholas Pooran (176)	Tilak Varma (173)
Most wickets	Romario Shepherd (9)	Arshdeep Singh (7)
- Player of the series: Nicholas Pooran (WI)

The India men's cricket team toured the West Indies and the United States in July and August 2023 to play two Test, three One Day International (ODI) and five Twenty20 International (T20I) matches. The Test series formed part of the 2023–2025 ICC World Test Championship. The International Cricket Council (ICC) confirmed this FTP tour in their press release in August 2022.

Originally, three T20I matches were scheduled to take place in the West Indies. However in March 2023, the Board of Control for Cricket in India (BCCI) agreed to the proposal of Cricket West Indies (CWI) to include two more T20I matches in the tour. In April 2023, CWI announced that the two extra T20I matches would take place in Florida, United States. On 12 June 2023, CWI announced the schedule of the tour.

== Squads ==
West Indies			India		
Tests	ODI	T20Is	Tests	ODIs	T20Is
Kraigg Brathwaite (c); Jermaine Blackwood (vc); Alick Athanaze; Tagenarine Chanderpaul; Rahkeem Cornwall; Joshua Da Silva (wk); Shannon Gabriel; Jason Holder; Alzarri Joseph; Kirk McKenzie; Raymon Reifer; Kemar Roach; Kevin Sinclair; Jomel Warrican	Shai Hope (c, wk); Rovman Powell (vc); Alick Athanaze; Yannic Cariah; Keacy Carty; Dominic Drakes; Shimron Hetmyer; Alzarri Joseph; Brandon King; Kyle Mayers; Gudakesh Motie; Jayden Seales; Romario Shepherd; Kevin Sinclair; Oshane Thomas	Rovman Powell (c); Kyle Mayers (vc); Johnson Charles (wk); Roston Chase; Shimron Hetmyer; Jason Holder; Shai Hope (wk); Akeal Hosein; Alzarri Joseph; Brandon King; Obed McCoy; Nicholas Pooran (wk); Romario Shepherd; Odean Smith; Oshane Thomas	Rohit Sharma (c); Ajinkya Rahane (vc); Ravichandran Ashwin; KS Bharat (wk); Ruturaj Gaikwad; Shubman Gill; Ravindra Jadeja; Yashasvi Jaiswal; Ishan Kishan (wk); Virat Kohli; Mukesh Kumar; Axar Patel; Navdeep Saini; Mohammed Siraj; Shardul Thakur; Jaydev Unadkat	Rohit Sharma (c); Hardik Pandya (vc); Yuzvendra Chahal; Ruturaj Gaikwad; Shubman Gill; Ravindra Jadeja; Ishan Kishan (wk); Virat Kohli; Mukesh Kumar; Axar Patel; Sanju Samson (wk); ~~Mohammed Siraj~~; Shardul Thakur; Umran Malik; Jaydev Unadkat; Kuldeep Yadav; Suryakumar Yadav	Hardik Pandya (c); Suryakumar Yadav (vc); Ravi Bishnoi; Yuzvendra Chahal; Shubman Gill; Yashasvi Jaiswal; Avesh Khan; Ishan Kishan (wk); Mukesh Kumar; Axar Patel; Sanju Samson (wk); Arshdeep Singh; Umran Malik; Tilak Varma; Kuldeep Yadav

Tevin Imlach and Akeem Jordan were named as travelling reserves for the Test squad. On 18 July 2023, Kevin Sinclair was added to the squad for the second Test, in the place of Raymon Reifer. Ahead of the ODI series, Mohammed Siraj was rested from India's ODI squad.

== Test series ==
=== 1st Test ===
12–14 July 2023
Scorecard

West Indies	v	India
150 (64.3 overs); Alick Athanaze 47 (99); Ravichandran Ashwin 5/60 (24.3 overs)		421/5d (152.2 overs); Yashasvi Jaiswal 171 (387); Rahkeem Cornwall 1/32 (16 overs)
130 (50.3 overs); Alick Athanaze 28 (44); Ravichandran Ashwin 7/71 (21.3 overs)

India won by an innings and 141 runs
Windsor Park, Roseau
Umpires: Michael Gough (Eng) and Richard Kettleborough (Eng)
Player of the match: Yashasvi Jaiswal (Ind)

- West Indies won the toss and elected to bat.
- Alick Athanaze (WI), Yashasvi Jaiswal and Ishan Kishan (Ind) all made their Test debuts.
- Yashasvi Jaiswal (Ind) scored his first century in Tests.
- Ravichandran Ashwin (Ind) became the fifth bowler, and the first Indian, to dismiss a father-son duo in Tests.
- World Test Championship points: India 12, West Indies 0.

=== 2nd Test ===
20–24 July 2023
Scorecard

India	v	West Indies
438 (128 overs); Virat Kohli 121 (206); Jomel Warrican 3/89 (39 overs)		255 (115.4 overs); Kraigg Brathwaite 75 (235); Mohammed Siraj 5/60 (23.4 overs)
181/2d (24 overs); Rohit Sharma 57 (44); Shannon Gabriel 1/33 (6 overs)		76/2 (32 overs); Kraigg Brathwaite 28 (52); Ravichandran Ashwin 2/33 (11 overs)

Match drawn
Queen's Park Oval, Port of Spain
Umpires: Marais Erasmus (SA) and Richard Kettleborough (Eng)
Player of the match: Mohammed Siraj (Ind)

- West Indies won the toss and elected to field.
- Only 67 overs and 63.4 overs of play was possible on Day 3 and Day 4 respectively due to rain.
- No play was possible on Day 5 due to rain.
- Kirk McKenzie (WI) and Mukesh Kumar (Ind) both made their Test debuts.
- This was the 100th Test match to be played between the two teams.
- Virat Kohli (Ind) played in his 500th international match, and became the tenth cricketer to achieve this.
- Ajinkya Rahane (Ind) played in his last Test match.
- World Test Championship points: West Indies 4, India 4.

== ODI series ==
=== 1st ODI ===
27 July 2023
09:30
Scorecard

West Indies; 114 (23 overs)	v	India; 118/5 (22.5 overs)
Shai Hope 43 (45); Kuldeep Yadav 4/6 (3 overs)		Ishan Kishan 52 (46); Gudakesh Motie 2/26 (6.5 overs)

India won by 5 wickets
Kensington Oval, Bridgetown
Umpires: Nigel Duguid (WI) and Michael Gough (Eng)
Player of the match: Kuldeep Yadav (Ind)

- India won the toss and elected to field.
- Mukesh Kumar (Ind) made his ODI debut.

=== 2nd ODI ===
29 July 2023
09:30
Scorecard

India; 181 (40.5 overs)	v	West Indies; 182/4 (36.4 overs)
Ishan Kishan 55 (55); Gudakesh Motie 3/36 (9.5 overs)		Shai Hope 63* (80); Shardul Thakur 3/42 (8 overs)

West Indies won by 6 wickets
Kensington Oval, Bridgetown
Umpires: Gregory Brathwaite (WI) and Marais Erasmus (SA)
Player of the match: Shai Hope (WI)

- West Indies won the toss and elected to field.

=== 3rd ODI ===
1 August 2023
09:30
Scorecard

India; 351/5 (50 overs)	v	West Indies; 151 (35.3 overs)
Shubman Gill 85 (92); Romario Shepherd 2/73 (10 overs)		Gudakesh Motie 39* (34); Shardul Thakur 4/37 (6.3 overs)

India won by 200 runs
Brian Lara Cricket Academy, San Fernando
Umpires: Michael Gough (Eng) and Leslie Reifer (WI)
Player of the match: Shubman Gill (Ind)

- West Indies won the toss and elected to field.
- This was the first ODI match to be played at this venue.

== T20I series ==
=== 1st T20I ===
3 August 2023
10:30
Scorecard

West Indies; 149/6 (20 overs)	v	India; 145/9 (20 overs)
Rovman Powell 48 (32); Yuzvendra Chahal 2/24 (2 overs)		Tilak Varma 39 (22); Jason Holder 2/19 (4 overs)

West Indies won by 4 runs
Brian Lara Cricket Academy, San Fernando
Umpires: Gregory Brathwaite (WI) and Patrick Gustard (WI)
Player of the match: Jason Holder (WI)

- West Indies won the toss and elected to bat.
- Mukesh Kumar and Tilak Varma (Ind) both made their T20I debuts.
- This was India's 200th T20I.

=== 2nd T20I ===
6 August 2023
10:30
Scorecard

India; 152/7 (20 overs)	v	West Indies; 155/8 (18.5 overs)
Tilak Varma 51 (41); Romario Shepherd 3/28 (3 overs)		Nicholas Pooran 67 (40); Hardik Pandya 3/35 (4 overs)

West Indies won by 2 wickets
Providence Stadium, Providence
Umpires: Nigel Duguid (WI) and Leslie Reifer (WI)
Player of the match: Nicholas Pooran (WI)

- India won the toss and elected to bat.

=== 3rd T20I ===
8 August 2023
10:30
Scorecard

West Indies; 159/5 (20 overs)	v	India; 164/3 (17.5 overs)
Brandon King 42 (42); Kuldeep Yadav 3/28 (4 overs)		Suryakumar Yadav 83 (44); Alzarri Joseph 2/25 (4 overs)

India won by 7 wickets
Providence Stadium, Providence
Umpires: Nigel Duguid (WI) and Patrick Gustard (WI)
Player of the match: Suryakumar Yadav (Ind)

- West Indies won the toss and elected to bat.
- Yashasvi Jaiswal (Ind) made his T20I debut.

=== 4th T20I ===
12 August 2023
10:30
Scorecard

West Indies; 178/8 (20 overs)	v	India; 179/1 (17 overs)
Shimron Hetmyer 61 (39); Arshdeep Singh 3/38 (4 overs)		Yashasvi Jaiswal 84* (51); Romario Shepherd 1/35 (3 overs)

India won by 9 wickets
Central Broward Park, Lauderhill
Umpires: Gregory Brathwaite (WI) and Leslie Reifer (WI)
Player of the match: Yashasvi Jaiswal (Ind)

- West Indies won the toss and elected to bat.

=== 5th T20I ===
13 August 2023
10:30
Scorecard

India; 165/9 (20 overs)	v	West Indies; 171/2 (18 overs)
Suryakumar Yadav 61 (45); Romario Shepherd 4/31 (4 overs)		Brandon King 85* (55); Tilak Varma 1/17 (2 overs)

West Indies won by 8 wickets
Central Broward Park, Lauderhill
Umpires: Gregory Brathwaite (WI) and Nigel Duguid (WI)
Player of the match: Romario Shepherd (WI)

- India won the toss and elected to bat.
