= Jair McAllister =

West Indies cricketer

Personal information
- Born: 30 August 1996 (age 30)
- Batting: Right-handed
- Role: Bowler

Domestic team information
- Years: Team
- 2023-present: Barbados cricket team
- 2023-present: Saint Lucia Kings

Career statistics
Competition	FC	List A	T20
Matches	11	6	1
Runs scored	37	1	0
Batting average	3.36	0.50	-
100s/50s	0/0	0/0	0/0
Top score	12	1	-
Balls bowled	1447	150	6
Wickets	38	5	1
Bowling average	22.78	25.00	-
5 wickets in innings	1	0	0
10 wickets in match	0	0	0
Best bowling	5/60	2/15	1/7
Catches/stumpings	6/0	2/0	0/0
- Source: Cricinfo, 5 December 2023

Jair McAllister (born 30 August 1996) is a West Indies cricketer.

== Career ==
He made his first-class debut for Barbados against Guyana on 1 February 2023 during the 2022–23 West Indies Championship. In May 2023, he was named as part of the West Indies A cricket team for their tour of Bangladesh to play against the Bangladesh A side in three unofficial tests. McAllister took his maiden five-wicket haul in first-class cricket during the first unofficial test against Bangladesh A and bagged a match haul of 7/108 in the match which ended in a draw. In June 2023, he was named in the 18-member squad for the preparation camp ahead of the two-match home test series against India.

He was signed by Saint Lucia Kings for the 2023 Caribbean Premier League season. He eventually made his T20 debut during the 2023 season in a league stage match against the Guyana Amazon Warriors on 19 August 2023, which ended up being a rain-curtailed match. McAllister managed to bowl only a solitary over on his CPL debut, conceding seven runs, but he got rid of Azam Khan to secure his first CPL wicket as well as his first wicket in T20 cricket, before rain stopped any further play.

He made his List A debut playing for Barbados against Jamaica on 20 October 2023 during the 2023–24 Super50 Cup. In November 2023, he was named in the West Indies A side for their tour of South Africa to play against the South African A side in a three-match first-class series.
