= West Indies A cricket team in Bangladesh in 2023 =

International cricket tour

	Bangladesh A	West Indies A
- Dates: 16 May – 2 June 2023
Captains	Afif Hossain	Joshua Da Silva

FC series
- Result: West Indies A won the 3-match series 1–0
Most runs	Saif Hassan (218)	Joshua Da Silva (300)
Most wickets	Saif Hassan (8)	Kevin Sinclair (13)

The West Indies A cricket team toured Bangladesh in May and June 2023 to play three first-class matches against the Bangladesh A cricket team. All the matches were played at Sylhet International Cricket Stadium in Sylhet. The series was used by Bangladesh as preparation ahead of their Test series against Afghanistan at home. In April 2023, the Bangladesh Cricket Board (BCB) confirmed the tour itinerary. West Indies A arrived in Bangladesh on 11 May 2023.

== Squads ==
Bangladesh A	(Cricket West Indies) West Indies A
Zakir Hasan; ~~Jaker Ali~~; Mohammad Naim; Shadman Islam; Mahmudul Hasan Joy; Afif Hossain (c); Saif Hassan; Musfik Hasan; Shahadat Hossain; Rishad Hossain; Naeem Hasan; Tanvir Islam; ~~Rejaur Rahman Raja~~; Ripon Mondol; Tanzim Hasan Sakib; Khaled Ahmed; Irfan Shukkur	Joshua Da Silva (c); Alick Athanaze; Yannic Cariah; Keacy Carty; Tagenarine Chanderpaul; Tevin Imlach; Akeem Jordan; Brandon King; Jair McAllister; Zachary McCaskie; Kirk McKenzie; ~~Gudakesh Motie~~; Anderson Phillip; Raymon Reifer; Kevin Sinclair; Veerasammy Permaul

Cricket West Indies (CWI) announced changes to the West Indies "A" Team squad for the ongoing "A" Team Series in Bangladesh, left-arm spinner Veerasammy Permaul will travel to Sylhet as cover for fellow left-arm spinner Gudakesh Motie, who has been ruled out of the remainder of the three-match series with a lower back injury.

== Venues ==

Sylhet	Sylhet
Sylhet International Cricket Stadium	Sylhet Outer Cricket Stadium
Capacity: 18,500	–
Sylhet International Cricket Stadium	
Matches: 2	Matches: 1

== First-class series ==
=== 1st Unofficial Test ===
16–19 May 2023
Scorecard

(Cricket West Indies) West Indies A	v	Bangladesh A
427/7d (126.3 overs); Kirk McKenzie 86 (124); Musfik Hasan 3/54 (20 overs)		264 (67.4 overs); Saif Hassan 95 (71); Jair McAllister 5/60 (15 overs)
		187/7 (51.1 overs) (f/o); Shadman Islam 64 (90); Gudakesh Motie 2/13 (5 overs)

Match drawn
Sylhet International Cricket Stadium, Sylhet
Umpires: Muhammad Kamruzzaman (Ban) and Sharfuddoula (Ban)
Player of the match: Jair McAllister (West Indies A)

- West Indies A won the toss and elected to bat.

=== 2nd Unofficial Test ===
23–26 May 2023
Scorecard

Bangladesh A	v	(Cricket West Indies) West Indies A
237 (65.3 overs); Shahadat Hossain 73 (124); Akeem Jordan 5/45 (18.3 overs)		345 (96.1 overs); Kirk McKenzie 91 (122); Tanzim Hasan Sakib 4/59 (19.1 overs)
297 (72.4 overs); Shadman Islam 74 (127); Kevin Sinclair 5/79 (26 overs)		191/7 (49.5 overs); Brandon King 54 (78); Tanvir Islam 4/52 (13 overs)

West Indies A won by 3 wickets
Sylhet International Cricket Stadium Academy Ground, Sylhet
Umpires: Ali Arman (Ban) and Gazi Shoel (Ban)
Player of the match: Kevin Sinclair (West Indies A)

- West Indies A won the toss and elected to field.
- Shadman Islam (BAN A) retired hurt on 11* from 54/1 to 186/6 on Bangladesh first innings.

=== 3rd Unofficial Test ===
30 May–2 June 2023
Scorecard

West Indies A (Cricket West Indies)	v	Bangladesh A
445 (116.2 overs); Tagenarine Chanderpaul 83 (160); Nasum Ahmed 5/133 (38 overs)		205 (54 overs); Nasum Ahmed 38 (58); Veerasammy Permaul 3/38 (13 overs)
220/5d (16.3 overs); Tagenarine Chanderpaul 83* (165); Saif Hassan 3/62 (20.2 overs)		306/4 (91 overs); Mahmudul Hasan Joy 114* (268); Kevin Sinclair 3/94 (27 overs)

Match drawn
Sylhet International Cricket Stadium, Sylhet
Umpires: Masudur Rahman (Ban) and Morshed Ali Khan (Ban)
Player of the match: Mahmudul Hasan Joy (Bangladesh A)

- West Indies A won the toss and elected to bat.
