= Daren Powell =

Jamaican cricketer (born 1978)

Personal information
- Full name: Daren Brent Lyle Powell
- Born: 15 April 1978 (age 48); Jamaica
- Batting: Right-handed
- Bowling: Right arm fast medium
- Role: Bowler

International information
- National side: West Indies (2002-2009)
- Test debut (cap 243): 21 June 2002 v New Zealand
- Last Test: 6 March 2009 v England
- ODI debut (cap 111): 3 December 2002 v Bangladesh
- Last ODI: 20 March 2009 v England
- T20I debut (cap 12): 28 June 2007 v England
- Last T20I: 16 December 2007 v South Africa

Domestic team information
- Years: Team
- 2000/01–2009/10: Jamaica
- 2003/04: Gauteng
- 2004: Derbyshire
- 2007: Hampshire
- 2010: Lancashire

Career statistics
Competition	Test	ODI	T20I	FC
Matches	37	55	5	102
Runs scored	407	118	1	1,525
Batting average	7.82	5.36	–	12.60
100s/50s	0/0	0/0	0/0	0/4
Top score	36*	48*	1*	69
Balls bowled	7,077	2,850	102	16,806
Wickets	85	71	2	276
Bowling average	47.85	31.53	65.50	33.76
5 wickets in innings	1	0	0	6
10 wickets in match	0	0	0	0
Best bowling	5/25	4/27	1/6	6/49
Catches/stumpings	8/–	13/–	2/–	31/–
- Source: CricketArchive, 19 September 2010

Daren Brent Lyle Powell (born 15 April 1978) is a former West Indian international cricketer who played first-class cricket for Jamaica. As a right-arm fast medium bowler, he has played Test matches and One Day Internationals (ODI) for the West Indian cricket team. Despite starting his cricketing career as a number 3 batsman, Powell is a genuine tailender. Powell has previously played for Gauteng, Derbyshire, Hampshire, and Lancashire.

== Early cricket ==
Daren Powell's father was a cricketer. Daren started playing cricket when he was about nine-years-old, and his first competitive experience was playing for St Elizabeth Technical High School. Powell originally bowled off spin. However, when his club was a seam bowler down in a match, he chose to switch his bowling action to fit the situation. He took seven wickets in the match while bowling seam.

== International career ==
On 21 June 2002, Powell made his international debut. He took three wickets in the Test match against New Zealand while conceding 102 runs; his first wicket was that of bowler Daryl Tuffey. New Zealand went on to win the match by 204 runs. Powell made his ODI debut later the same year; on 3 December 2002 in a match against Bangladesh during the West Indies tour of the country. He conceded 34 runs from 10 overs and took the wicket of opening batsman Anwar Hossain in the process of helping the West Indies win by 86 runs.

After taking nine wickets at 27.55 in the West Indies' One Day International series against India in 2006/07, he gained selection for the 2007 Cricket World Cup.

After poor performances with the ball in the test series against England in early 2009, taking six wickets at 69.33, he was dropped for the return series against England later in the summer.

Ironically, given his lack of batting pedigree, it was with the bat that he had proved to be relatively effective, frustrating England's bowlers as he helped his side hang on for draws to seal the series in the Caribbean 1–0.

A pay dispute between West Indies players and the West Indies Cricket Board in July 2009 led to an understrength team playing against Bangladesh; in the 15-man squad, there were nine uncapped players and seven players made their debut in the first Test. Powell stated that he had been approached to bolster the team, but he elected not to play. However, when the Champions Trophy squad was named later that month, Powell was included in a group still badly affected by the pay dispute; he did not play in the tournament.

Later that year, it was announced that he had turned down other counties to sign a two-year contract to play for Lancashire as a Kolpak player, thus preventing him from representing the West Indies in the near future. Mike Watkinson, the club's director of cricket, described Powell as "a strike bowler of international quality, who will add strength and depth to our bowling attack" and said that the team would benefit from Powell's experience with the likely absence of Sajid Mahmood and James Anderson for parts of the season due to England duties. In February 2010, part-way through the West Indies cricket season, Powell withdrew from Jamaica's squad for "personal reasons". He had struggled for form, taking two wickets at an average of 73.00. Nehemiah Perry, Jamaica's chairman of selectors, said "[Powell] has decided to take a break and won't be available for the rest of the season. It's not a situation where he got dropped or anything. He's not enjoying cricket anymore as a person."

Powell was released from his contract with Lancashire in September 2010, a year before his contract expired. During his spell with Lancashire, Powell played in four County Championship matches, taking seven wickets at an average of nearly fifty. He went wicketless in his four T20 matches, although he took seven in nine Clydesdale Bank 40 matches. On the subject of Powell's time with Lancashire, Watkinson said "He has been a top bloke around the place but he hasn't quite been able to seize his opportunity when he has had it".
