= West Indies A cricket team =

Second-tier national team

West Indies 'A'
Personnel
- Coach: Rayon Griffith

Team information
- Founded: 1992

History
- First-class debut: England A in March 1992 at Queens Park Oval
- Official website: West Indies Cricket
First-class
List A

The West Indies 'A' cricket team represents Cricket West Indies and is considered its second-tier team in international cricket, below the top-level West Indies cricket team. The 'A' team is currently captained by wicketkeeper Joshua Da Silva in first-class cricket and coached by former Guyanese cricketer Rayon Griffith.

Matches played by West Indies 'A' are not Tests or One Day Internationals, but they usually have the first-class and List A status, respectively. West Indies A had toured Nepal in late April 2024 for five T20 matches where they won the series 3-2.

== Current squad ==
Name	Age	Batting Style	Bowling Style	Club
Batsmen
(Jamaica) Kirk McKenzie	25	Left-handed	Right-arm offspin	Jamaica
(Dominica) Alick Athanaze	27	Right-handed	Right-arm off break	Windward Islands
(Sint Maarten) Keacy Carty	28	Right-handed	Right-arm medium	Leeward Islands
(Guyana) Tagenarine Chanderpaul	29	Left-handed	Right-arm leg break	Guyana
(Guyana) Tevin Imlach	29	Right-handed		Guyana
(Barbados) Zachary McCaskie	29	Right-handed		Barbados
(Jamaica) Brandon King	31	Right-handed		Jamaica
All-rounders
(Barbados) Raymon Reifer	34	Left-handed	Left-arm medium-fast	Barbados
Wicket-keeper
(Trinidad and Tobago) Joshua Da Silva	27 (Note: First-class Captain)	Right-handed		Trinidad and Tobago
Spin Bowlers
(Guyana) Gudakesh Motie	30	Left-handed	Slow left-arm orthodox	Guyana
(Guyana) Kevin Sinclair	28	Right-handed	Right-arm off break	Guyana
Pace Bowlers
(Barbados) Akeem Jordan	31	Right-handed	Right-arm medium	Barbados
(Barbados) Jair McAllister	29	Right-handed	Right arm medium	Barbados
(Trinidad and Tobago) Anderson Phillip	31	Right-handed	Right arm fast medium	Trinidad and Tobago

Table notes

== Results ==
West Indies A matches		First-class v A team			Other first-class			List A v A team			Other List A		
Season	Venue	W	D	L	W	D	L	W	L	NR	W	L	NR
1991-92	West Indies	2	1	0	-	-	-	-	-	-	-	-	-
1994-95	West Indies	-	-	-	-	-	-	-	-	-	1	2	0
1996-97	Sri Lanka	2	1	0	0	1	0	1	2	0	1	0	0
1997-98	South Africa	0	0	3	2	2	0	0	2	1	0	1	1
1997-98	West Indies	-	-	-	0	1	0	-	-	-	-	-	-
1998-99 (Note: The season was topped and tailed in the West Indies; the two overseas tours intervened.)	West Indies	-	-	-	0	1	0	-	-	-	-	-	-
1998-99	Bangladesh	-	-	-	1	0	0	-	-	-	1	2	0
1998-99	India	2	0	0	0	2	0	2	1	0	1	0	0
1998-99	West Indies	-	-	-	1	0	1	-	-	-	-	-	-
1999-2000	West Indies	0	2	0	1	0	0	1	0	1 (Note: One further match was abandoned without a ball being bowled.)	-	-	-
2000	West Indies	0	2	0	-	-	-	0	2	0	-	-	-
2002	England	-	-	-	1	3 (Note: One further match was tied.)	1	-	-	-	3	2	0
2005	Sri Lanka	1	0	2	-	-	-	1	3	0	-	-	-

== See also ==
- West Indies Under-19 cricket team
- West Indies cricket team
- West Indies B cricket team
