= West Indian cricket team in Bangladesh in 2002–03 =

West Indian cricket team in Bangladesh in 2002-03
| | Bangladesh | West Indies |
- Dates: 29 November 2002 – 20 December 2002
| Captains | Khaled Mashud | Ridley Jacobs |

Test series
- Result: West Indies won the 2-match series 2–0
| Most runs | Alok Kapali (139) | Ridley Jacobs (150) |
| Most wickets | Tapash Baisya (8) | Pedro Collins (12) |
- Player of the series: Jermaine Lawson (WI)

One Day International series
- Results: West Indies won the 3-match series 2–0
| Most runs | Alok Kapali (121) | Ramnaresh Sarwan (169) |
| Most wickets | Mushfiqur Rahman (3) | Vasbert Drakes (12) |
- Player of the series: Vasbert Drakes (WI)

The West Indies cricket team toured Bangladesh from 29 November to 20 December 2002 to play two Tests and three One Day Internationals (ODIs).

The West Indies won both Test matches and two ODIs, while a rain-affected ODI where Bangladesh were struggling ended in no result.

== ODI Series ==
=== 1st ODI ===
29 November 2002 (D/N)
Scorecard

| West Indies; 275/7 (50 overs) | v | Bangladesh; 90/5 (17 overs) |
| Ricardo Powell 88 (50); Mohammad Ashraful 2/71 (9 overs) | | Mohammad Ashraful 29 (25); Vasbert Drakes 4/26 (8 overs) |

No Result
MA Aziz Stadium, Chittagong
Umpires: AFM Akhtaruddin (BAN) and David Shepherd (ENG)

- Bangladesh won the toss and elected to field

=== 2nd ODI ===
2 December 2002 (D/N)
Scorecard

| West Indies; 266/4 (50 overs) | v | Bangladesh; 182 (48 overs) |
| Ramnaresh Sarwan 102 (100); Manjural Islam 1/20 (10 overs) | | Mohammad Ashraful 44 (74); Vasbert Drakes 4/18 (9 overs) |

West Indies won by 84 runs
Bangabandhu National Stadium, Dhaka
Umpires: Mahbubur Rahman (BAN) and David Shepherd (ENG)
Player of the match: Ramnaresh Sarwan (WI)

- West Indies won the toss and elected to bat
- ODI debut: Ehsanul Haqu (BAN)

=== 3rd ODI ===
3 December 2002 (D/N)
Scorecard

| West Indies; 281/5 (50 overs) | v | Bangladesh; 195/9 (50 overs) |
| Marlon Samuels 77 (101); Sanwar Hossain 1/16 (3.3 overs) | | Alok Kapali 89 (92); Vasbert Drakes 4/33 (10 overs) |

West Indies won by 86 runs
Bangabandhu National Stadium, Dhaka
Umpires: AFM Akhtaruddin (BAN) and David Shepherd (ENG)
Player of the match: Vasbert Drakes (WIN)

- West Indies won the toss and elected to bat
- ODI debuts: Anwar Hossain (BAN), Daren Powell (WIN)
- This was the last ODI match played by Cameron Cuffy.

== Test series ==
=== 1st Test ===
8–12 December 2002
Scorecard

| Bangladesh | v | West Indies |
| 139 (54.1 overs); Alok Kapali 52 (94); Pedro Collins 5/26 (17.1 overs) | | 536 (160 overs); Ramnaresh Sarwan 119 (228); Talha Jubair 3/135 (31 overs) |
| 87 (31.5 overs); Hannan Sarkar 25 (29); Jermaine Lawson 6/3 (6.5 overs) |

West Indies won by an innings and 310 runs
Bangabandhu National Stadium, Dhaka
Umpires: Dave Orchard (RSA) and David Shepherd (ENG)
Player of the match: Jermaine Lawson (WIN)

- West Indies won the toss and elected to field.
- Anwar Hossain (BAN) and Vasbert Drakes (WIN) made their debut in Tests.
- Lawson's 6/3 off 6.5 overs was the second-most economical five-wicket haul in Tests.

=== 2nd Test ===
26–30 December
Scorecard

| Bangladesh | v | West Indies |
| 194 (63.1 overs); Sanwar Hossain 36 (63); Daren Powell 3/51 (16 overs) | | 296 (93.3 overs); Daren Ganga 63 (106); Tapash Baisya 4/72 (21.3 overs) |
| 212 (72 overs); Alok Kapali 85 (111); Daren Powell 3/36 (13 overs) | | 111/3 (21.3 overs); Chris Gayle 37 (31); Tapash Baisya 2/45 (9 overs) |

West Indies won by 7 wickets
MA Aziz Stadium, Chittagong
Umpires: Dave Orchard (RSA) and David Shepherd (ENG)
Player of the match: Alok Kapali (BAN)

- Bangladesh won the toss and elected to bat.
