= Zimbabwean cricket team in the West Indies in 1999–2000 =

The Zimbabwe national cricket team toured the West Indies from March to April 2000 and played a two-match Test series against the West Indies cricket team which the West Indies won 2–0. Zimbabwe were captained by Andy Flower; the West Indies by Jimmy Adams.

== Test series summary ==
=== First Test ===
16–20 March 2000
(5-day match)
Scorecard

West Indies	v	Zimbabwe
187 (80.4 overs); WW Hinds 46* (117); HH Streak 4/45 (24 overs)		236 (107 overs); A Flower 113* (290); CEL Ambrose 4/42 (25 overs)
147 (75 overs); S Chanderpaul 49 (174); HH Streak 5/27 (17 overs)		63 (47 overs); GW Flower 26 (126); FA Rose 3/8 (11 overs)

West Indies won by 35 runs
Queen's Park Oval, Port of Spain
Umpires: SA Bucknor (WI) and G Sharp (ENG)
Player of the match: CEL Ambrose (WI)

- Zimbabwe won the toss and elected to field.
- Zimbabwe's target of 99 is the second-lowest target successfully defended in Test cricket history.
- CH Gayle and WW Hinds (both WI) and BA Murphy (ZIM) made their Test debuts.

=== Second Test ===
24–28 March 2000
(5-day match)
Scorecard

Zimbabwe	v	West Indies
308 (115.4 overs); MW Goodwin 113 (239); RD King 5/51 (23 overs)		339 (164.1 overs); JC Adams 101* (372); NC Johnson 4/77 (37 overs)
102 (59.5 overs); NC Johnson 29 (76); CA Walsh 3/21 (15.5 overs)		75/0 (12.4 overs); AFG Griffith 54* (41)

West Indies won by 10 wickets
Sabina Park, Kingston, Jamaica
Umpires: Athar Zaidi (PAK) and EA Nicholls (WI)
Player of the match: JC Adams (WI)

- Zimbabwe won the toss and elected to bat.
