= Kevin Sinclair (cricketer) =

West Indian cricketer (born 1999)

Personal information
- Born: 23 November 1999 (age 26); Guyana
- Batting: Right-handed
- Bowling: Right-arm off break
- Role: Bowler

International information
- National side: West Indies (2021–present)
- Test debut (cap 338): 25 January 2024 v Australia
- Last Test: 25 January 2025 v Pakistan
- ODI debut (cap 215): 17 August 2022 v New Zealand
- Last ODI: 7 July 2023 v Sri Lanka
- T20I debut (cap 85): 3 March 2021 v Sri Lanka
- Last T20I: 29 June 2021 v South Africa

Domestic team information
- Years: Team
- 2020–present: Guyana Amazon Warriors (squad no. 73)
- 2019-present: Guyana

Career statistics
| Competition | Test | ODI | T20I | FC |
|---|---|---|---|---|
| Matches | 4 | 7 | 6 | 37 |
| Runs scored | 118 | 38 | 3 | 1,776 |
| Batting average | 16.85 | 19.00 | 3.00 | 33.50 |
| 100s/50s | 0/1 | 0/0 | 0/0 | 1/12 |
| Top score | 50 | 25 | 3 | 165* |
| Balls bowled | 552 | 381 | 108 | 5,023 |
| Wickets | 9 | 11 | 4 | 91 |
| Bowling average | 42.66 | 25.63 | 37.50 | 29.12 |
| 5 wickets in innings | 0 | 0 | 0 | 4 |
| 10 wickets in match | 0 | 0 | 0 | 0 |
| Best bowling | 3/61 | 4/24 | 2/23 | 6/33 |
| Catches/stumpings | 4/– | 6/– | 3/– | 29/– |
- Source: ESPNcricinfo, 10 April 2025

Kevin Sinclair (born 23 November 1999) is a Guyanese cricketer. He made his international debut for the West Indies in March 2021.

== Career ==
Sinclair made his List A debut on 7 November 2019, for the West Indies Emerging Team in the 2019–20 Regional Super50 tournament. He made his first-class debut on 16 January 2020, for Guyana in the 2019–20 West Indies Championship.

In July 2020, Sinclair was named in the Guyana Amazon Warriors squad for the 2020 Caribbean Premier League (CPL). He made his Twenty20 debut on 30 August 2020, for the Guyana Amazon Warriors in the 2020 CPL.

In February 2021, Sinclair was named in the West Indies' limited overs squads for their series against Sri Lanka. He made his T20I debut for the West Indies on 3 March 2021, against Sri Lanka. In August 2022, he was named in West Indies' ODI squad, for their series against New Zealand. He made his ODI debut on 17 August 2022, for the West Indies against New Zealand.

In July 2023, he was named in the West Indies' Test squad for their series against India. In December 2023, he was selected in West Indies's squad for the test match series against Australia. He made his test debut against Australia on 25 January 2024 at Brisbane. He scored 50 runs in the first innings and remained not out on 14 runs in the second innings besides taking one wicket in the match.

In December 2024, he was picked in West Indies squad for the test match series in Pakistan.
