= Kraigg Brathwaite =

Barbadian cricketer

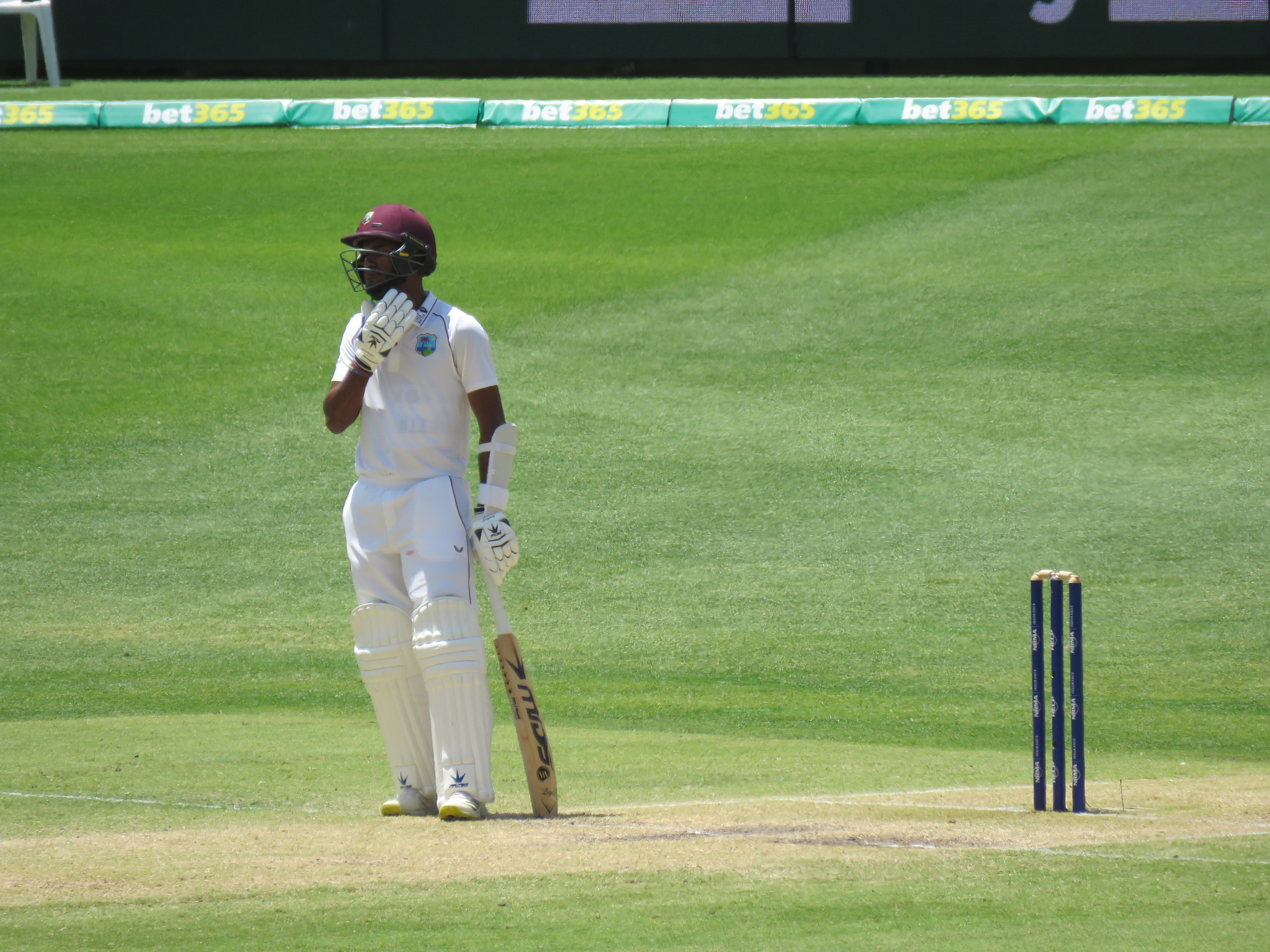
- Brathwaite in 2022

Personal information
- Full name: Kraigg Clairmonte Brathwaite
- Born: 1 December 1992 (age 33); Bridgetown, Barbados
- Nickname: BoBo
- Batting: Right-handed
- Bowling: Right-arm off break
- Role: Opening batter

International information
- National side: West Indies (2011–present)
- Test debut (cap 290): 20 May 2011 v Pakistan
- Last Test: 3 July 2025 v Australia
- ODI debut (cap 172): 30 September 2016 v Pakistan
- Last ODI: 9 March 2017 v England

Domestic team information
- Years: Team
- 2008–present: Barbados
- 2017: Yorkshire
- 2018: Nottinghamshire
- 2019: Glamorgan
- 2021: Gloucestershire
- 2023: Warwickshire

Career statistics
| Competition | Test | ODI | FC | LA |
|---|---|---|---|---|
| Matches | 100 | 10 | 228 | 63 |
| Runs scored | 5,950 | 278 | 14,529 | 1,929 |
| Batting average | 32.51 | 27.8 | 37.63 | 35.72 |
| 100s/50s | 12/31 | 0/1 | 33/67 | 3/9 |
| Top score | 212 | 78 | 276 | 108 |
| Balls bowled | 2,809 | 152 | 4,361 | 534 |
| Wickets | 29 | 1 | 51 | 6 |
| Bowling average | 53.72 | 140.0 | 45.43 | 70.00 |
| 5 wickets in innings | 1 | 0 | 1 | 0 |
| 10 wickets in match | 0 | 0 | 0 | 0 |
| Best bowling | 6/29 | 1/56 | 6/29 | 1/6 |
| Catches/stumpings | 49/– | 3/0 | 133/– | 15/– |
- Source: ESPNcricinfo, 7 July 2025

Kraigg Clairmonte Brathwaite (born 1 December 1992) is a Barbadian professional cricket right-handed batter and occasional off spinner who plays for the Barbados national team in regional competitions. During his international career for the West Indies between 2011 and 2025, he played predominantly as an opener in Test matches and served as the Test captain between 2020 and 2025. As of June 2026, Brathwaite has scored the tenth-highest number of Test career runs for the West Indies. Throughout his career, he has played for several county cricket clubs in England.

== Personal life ==
Brathwaite was a student at Combermere School in Saint Michael, Barbados. He and the singer Rihanna were friends there. It is believed that Rihanna often came to the rescue to help Brathwaite overcome his anxiety, especially when Kraigg was subjected to bullying on the school bus.

== Domestic career ==
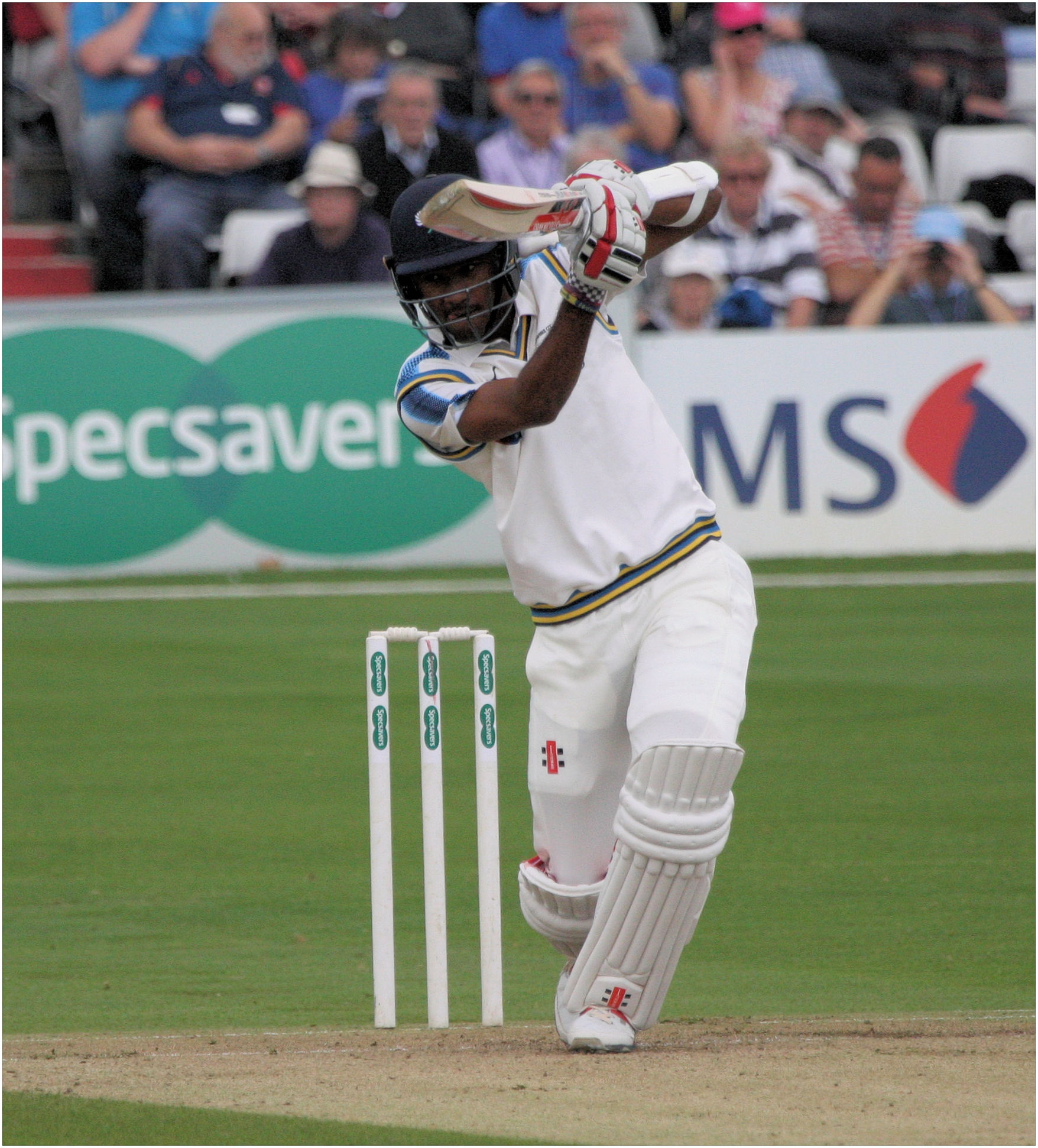
Brathwaite playing for Yorkshire in 2017

Brathwaite had scored 28 centuries in local cricket in Barbados before being included in West Indian under-15 team competing in the Clico International Under-15 Cricket Championships in 2008. He scored 122 on his debut for the West Indies U15 team. He made his first-class cricket debut at the age of 16 for Combined Campuses and Colleges against Barbados on 3 April 2009 where he made 73 runs opening the batting. Later that month, he was selected for the Barbados team to play Guyana at Providence Stadium.

Brathwaite was included in the West Indian U19 squad for the 2010 ICC U19 World Cup in New Zealand and he emerged as the leading run-scorer for the West Indies, scoring 335 runs in 6 innings including 4 fifties at a healthy average of 67. He was the second leading run-scorer of the tournament after South Africa's Dominic Hendricks. Brathwaite led West Indies under-19 team in the 2012 Under-19 Cricket World Cup in Australia. He later graduated from Barbados' Sagicor High Performance Centre.

In September 2013, Brathwaite toured with West Indies A to India for an unofficial test series, scoring 334 runs in 6 innings with an average of 55.66. This included two half-centuries and a century. In January 2014, Brathwaite was announced as Barbados' Regional 4-day captain. Brathwaite was part of the Barbados Regional super 50 2014 squad which won the competition and had scores of 2, 29*, 55* and 36 against Trinidad, Leeward Islands, Guyana and Trinidad respectively. Brathwaite started off the first-class season as captain well, taking Barbados to the top of the table. In five matches Brathwaite made 85 and 15 against Windward Islands, 19 and 5 against Guyana, 91 vs Combined Campuses and Colleges (CCC), 0 against Trinidad, and 21 and 91 against Jamaica. In October 2018, Cricket West Indies (CWI) awarded him a red-ball contract for the 2018–19 season. In 2018, he was signed by Nottinghamshire for the County Championship to replace Quinton de Kock who pulled out due to international commitments.

In November 2020, Brathwaite made his highest first-class score, with 246 against New Zealand A at Queenstown. In February 2022, in the 2021–22 West Indies Championship, he improved on that, by making 276 runs against Jamaica. It was his 25th century in first-class cricket. In 2021, he was signed by Gloucestershire for the first two months of the County Championship season as an overseas player and he was available for eight county fixtures.

== International career ==
In June 2009, Brathwaite was called into the West Indian squad for the series of Test matches against Bangladesh as a replacement for players participating in a strike called by the West Indies Players' Association. He made his test debut against Pakistan on 20 May 2011 and opened the batting alongside Lendl Simmons.

In November 2013, Brathwaite got a test recall for West Indies' test match series against New Zealand in December replacing an injured Chris Gayle after attempting a run a in the second One-Day International against India. Brathwaite experienced problems obtaining the required visa, having to wait two weeks before he got to New Zealand. He eventually played in the third and final test. On Brathwaite's return to the West Indies he scored 45 and 7.

In September 2014, he made his highest test individual score of 212 against the visiting Bangladesh in the first test of the home series which propelled West Indies to pile up a huge first innings score of 484/7 before declaring. He was declared the player of the match award for his first innings double century which ensured a comfortable ten wicket victory for the West Indies after enforcing follow-on to the visiting side. In 2015 during the third test match against South Africa at Newlands, he became the first batsman to get off the mark by scoring seven runs when he gained four extra runs due to an overthrow by wicket keeper AB de Villiers which missed the stumps at the bowlers' end and went to the boundary line in addition to the three runs he ran prior to the overthrow incident. According to a South African cricket statistician, Andrew Samson it was the first ever instance where a batsman's first scoring runs were seven.

His best bowling figure in a test innings is 6/29 which came against Sri Lanka during the second test of the series at the P Sara Oval, Colombo in 2015. He also registered the best bowling figures by anyone who had taken one or no wickets at all in their first 20 test matches. He also registered the best bowling figures in an innings of a test match by an opening batsman in nearly 50 years since Frank Worrell's 7/70 against England in 1957. Before registering his career best figures, he had taken only one test wicket at an average of 137 and only had three first-class wickets. His bowling efforts rattled Sri Lanka for only 206 runs leaving visitors West Indies a rather comfortable chase of 244 to win the test. However, West Indies lost the match by 72 runs after being bowled out for just 171.

In December 2015, at the Blundstone Arena in Hobart in the 2nd innings of the 1st test of the Sir Frank Worrell Trophy series against Australia, Brathwaite was last man out for a belligerent 94. His 94 accounted for 63.51% of the West Indies total of 148, the 4th highest percentage of runs in a completed innings in Test Match history. He made his One Day International (ODI) debut for the West Indies against Pakistan on 30 September 2016.

On 1 November 2016, Brathwaite carried his bat in the first innings becoming the fifth player for the West Indies to do so by scoring 142 not out against Pakistan at the Sharjah Cricket Stadium. In the second innings, he became the first opener to remain unbeaten in both innings of a Test.

In November 2017, he was named Test captain for 2nd Test against New Zealand, replacing Jason Holder who was suspended for one match, becoming the 37th Test captain of West Indies.

In 2017, his bowling action was reported for the first time when he delivered a few overs in the first test of the series against England at Edgbaston. He was later cleared to bowl again by the International Cricket Council at international level. During the second test match at Headingley, he and Shai Hope smashed crucial centuries to help West Indies level the series 1-1. He batted for a duration of six hours during his marathon innings of 134 and he also put on a crucial record breaking 246 run stand with Shai Hope for the fourth wicket. In September 2019, he was again under the scrutiny after being reported for suspected illegal bowling action for a second time in his career during the second test match against India in Kingston. However, in the same month after being reported for his bowling action, ICC clarified that his bowling action is legal and therefore he can continue bowling.

In June 2020, Brathwaite was named in the West Indies' Test squad, for their series against England. The Test series was originally scheduled to start in May 2020, but was moved back to July 2020 due to the COVID-19 pandemic.

=== Captaincy ===
In December 2020, Brathwaite was named as the captain of the West Indies' Test squad for their series against Bangladesh. Under his captaincy, a second string West Indies side pulled a dramatic upset by defeating first choice Bangladesh side 2–0 in the series with several inexperienced players turning out for the West Indies.

In March 2021, he was named as the permanent test captain of the West Indies following West Indies historic series win over Bangladesh under Kraigg's leadership.

In April 2021, he spent 813 minutes during the second test match of the home series against Sri Lanka and broke the then record held by Darren Bravo for spending most number of minutes at the crease in a test match by a Windies batsman. He scored 126 in the first innings of the second test to bring up his first test century as captain of the West Indies and it also effectively ended his lean patch with the bat in tests. He followed it up with a well composed 85 runs in the second innings in a test match which ended up in a draw and he was awarded man of the match for his batting efforts throughout the test match.

In the second test match of the three match test series against England at home in March 2022, he played a marathon knock in each innings of the match to help West Indies to secure a crucial draw. He scored 160 in the first innings, his tenth test century and occupied the crease for a whopping 700 minutes by batting for 11 hours. He also remained unbeaten on 56 facing 184 balls on the final day of the test match and received the player of the match award for his long marathon efforts with the bat in both the innings which helped West Indies to snatch a tense draw from the jaws of defeat when heading into the final hours of the day's play. He spent 15 hours and 45 minutes (955 minutes) at the crease in both the innings of the match and broke his own West Indies record of having spent the most number of minutes at the crease. Brathwaite meanwhile also set a new record for facing the most number of deliveries by a West Indian batter in a test match when he faced a record 673 deliveries across both the innings of the match. Brian Lara previously held the record for facing the most number of balls by a West Indies player in a test match whereas Lara faced 582 balls in his record breaking knock of unbeaten 400 in 2004. Brathwaite also set a record for the third longest ever marathon batting in a test match by a batter in terms of minutes, spending 955 minutes at the crease just behind Hanif Mohammad's 970+ minutes which was set in 1958 against West Indies at Barbados and Stephen Fleming's 956 minutes in 2003 against Sri Lanka. It was revealed that he was out of action and out of the field throughout the course of the test match for only 21.1 overs.

On 6 February 2023, Brathwaite scored his 12th Test century, against Zimbabwe. He scored 182 runs and put on a record-breaking 336-run partnership with Tagenarine Chanderpaul. The match ended in a draw. Under his captaincy, the West Indies drew a Test series in Australia, winning a Test match, for the first time in 27 years on Australian soil. In January 2025, Brathwaite led a young West Indies side to a Test victory in Pakistan after 35 years. In March, after three years as Test captain, Brathwaite stepped down from the role.
