= Tagenarine Chanderpaul =

West Indian cricketer

Personal information
- Full name: Tagenarine Brandon Chanderpaul
- Born: 31 May 1996 (age 30); Georgetown, Guyana
- Height: 5 ft 9 in (1.75 m)
- Batting: Left-handed
- Bowling: Right-arm leg break
- Role: Opening batter
- Relatives: Shivnarine Chanderpaul (father)

International information
- National side: West Indies (2022–present)
- Test debut (cap 330): 30 November 2022 v Australia
- Last Test: 28 October 2026 v Bangladesh

Domestic team information
- Years: Team
- 2013–: Guyana
- 2015: West Indies U19

Career statistics
Competition	Test	FC	LA
Matches	15	90	30
Runs scored	758	5,126	831
Batting average	28.07	35.10	28.65
100s/50s	1/2	9/22	0/3
Top score	207*	207*	77
Catches/stumpings	7/–	54/–	6/–
- Source: Cricinfo, 19 August 2026

Tagenarine Brandon Chanderpaul (born 31 May 1996) is a Guyanese cricketer who plays for Guyana in first-class cricket. He is a left-hand opening batsman. He made his international debut for the West Indies cricket team in November 2022. He is the eldest son of West Indies batsman Shivnarine Chanderpaul. He played the role of cricketer Larry Gomes in the Bollywood film 83.

== Youth career ==
As a prolific run scorer for Guyana at youth level, he earned a spot in the Windies squad for the 2014 Under-19s World Cup held in the UAE.

== Domestic career ==
He plays for Guyana in first-class cricket and made his first-class debut in February 2013 at age 16 for Guyana against Leeward Islands in the regional four-day competition at Sir Vivian Richards Stadium in North Sound.

His father Shivnarine had also made his first-class debut for Guyana as a teenager, when he was 18. Shivnarine was playing the Bangladesh Premier League and was away during the course of his son's debut.

He was dropped from the Guyana Jaguars Cricket team due to a lack of form however he was still offered a contract with the franchise along with fellow under19 stars: Shimron Hetmyer, Keemo Paul and Gudakesh Motie, all of whom made international debuts for the West Indies.

As of 31 July 2015, he was listed in the Demerara senior team to partake in the Guyana Cricket Board Inter County four-day Competition, where he will look to be a prolific scorer and make a claim for a second burst in first-class cricket. In the 2016–17 Regional Four Day Competition, Chanderpaul had the chance for several innings with his father; in March 2017, the Chanderpauls became the first father-son partnership to both score 50s in the same First-Class innings since CK and CN Nayudu in 1956–57.

On 13 January 2018, Tagenarine Chanderpaul scored his maiden first class century against Barbados. He scored unbeaten 101 runs facing 275 balls hitting nine boundaries. Finally match ended in a draw.

On 10 January 2019 Tagenarine Chanderpaul scored another century against Windward islands. He scored 117 runs facing 484 deliveries hitting 10 boundaries. Finally Guyana won the match by 8 wickets.

In October 2019, he was named in Guyana's squad for the 2019–20 Regional Super50 tournament.

He managed to bring his fine form. He was the second-highest run-getter in the 2021-22 West Indies four-day championship. He scored 439 runs in eight innings at an average of 73.16 including two centuries. His third first class century came against Barbados scoring unbeaten 140 runs which Guyana won the match by 5 wickets. His fourth first class century came against Jamaica scoring 184 runs facing 425 balls hitting 27 boundaries. Finally the match was drawn.

In 2023, Tagenarine was selected to West Indies A team for first class matches against Bangladesh. During the final match in the series he scored half centuries in both innings. He is the second highest run scorer in the series. He scored 275 runs in 5 innings including three half centuries with the average of 68.75.

== International career ==
In January 2015 as an 18 year old, he made his Youth International debut for the U19 West Indies side, playing 11 matches, including the 2014 Under-19 Cricket World Cup in the UAE, scoring 293 runs in 6 matches, including a century and two 50s. In August 2022, he was called up to the West Indies A side during the 2022 Bangladesh A tour of the West Indies, scoring an unbeaten century in the second Four Day Game. He scored unbeaten 109 runs from 337 deliveries hitting nine boundaries. Finally the match ended draw.

On the back of this performance, he was called up for the 2022 West Indian tour of Australia. During the warm up match against the Prime Minister's XI in Canberra in November 2022, he scored a century and half century, opening the batting. Chanderpaul made his debut in the first Test in Perth, receiving his Test cap from Brian Lara. He scored his maiden test half century in first innings and 45 runs in second innings. He top scored in each innings in the second Test in Adelaide (47 and 17) where West Indies were defeated by 419 runs. On 5 February 2023, Chanderpaul scored his maiden test century against Zimbabwe. Next day he converted his century into double century becoming tenth West Indies batman to do so. Chanderpaul scored unbeaten 207 runs and put 336 run partnership with West Indies captain Kraigg Brathwaite, becoming first pair to put 300+ opening stand for West Indies breaking 33-year-old record. Finally the match was drawn and Chanderpaul won player of the match award for his performance.

In December 2023, he was selected in West Indies squad for the test match series against Australia. In the first test match, he got out for a duck in the first innings and scored only 6 runs in the second innings.

== Personal life ==
He is an ethnic Indo-Guyanese.

In 2017, he and his father Shivnarine Chanderpaul became the first father-son duo since 1931 to hit half-centuries in the same first-class match, when they achieved it against Jamaica, playing for Guyana.

== Awards ==
- WICB/WIPA Under-19s Cricketer of year 2013
