= Joshua Da Silva =

Trinidadian cricketer (born 1998)

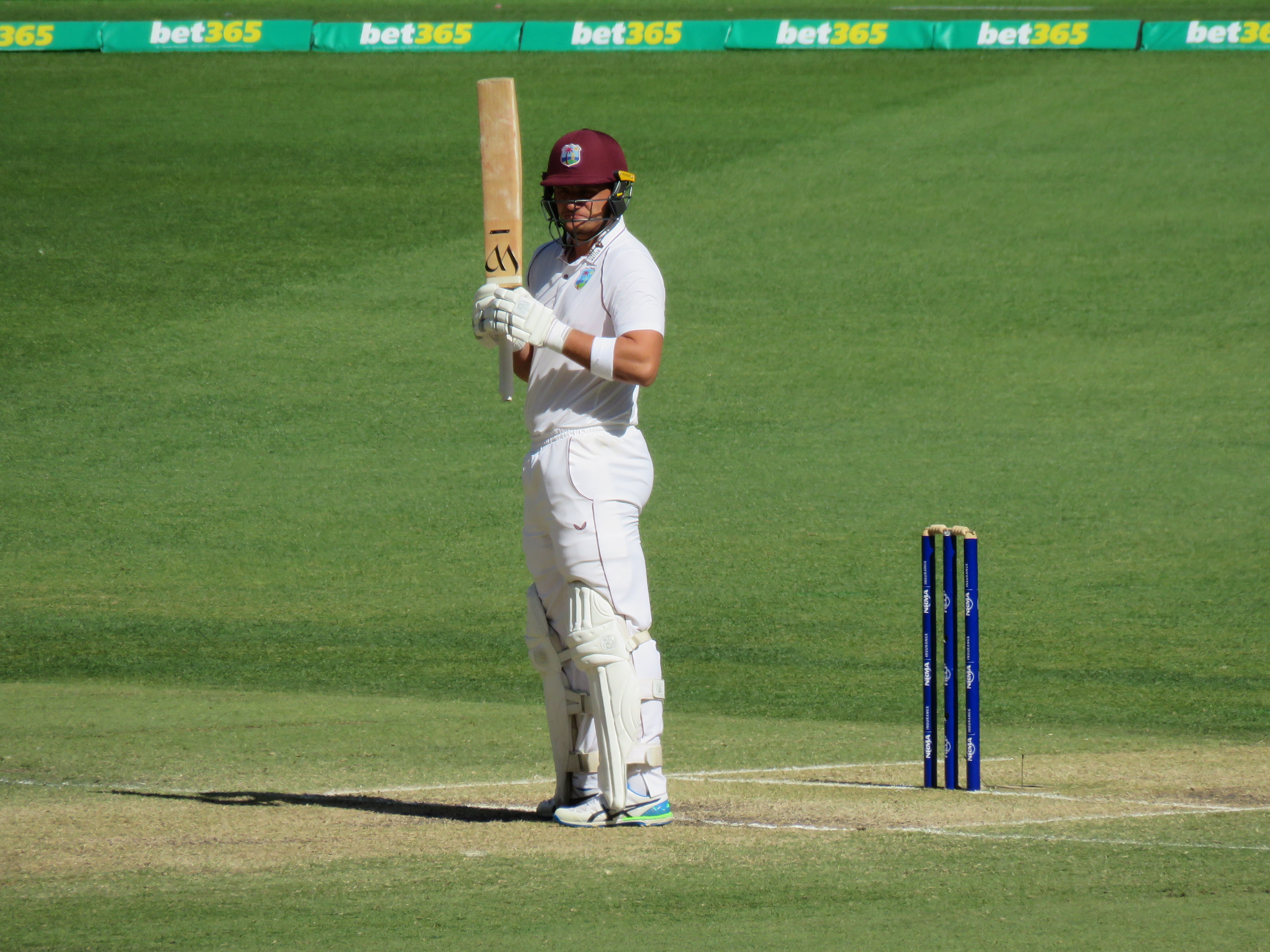
- Da Silva in 2022

Personal information
- Full name: Joshua Michael Da Silva
- Born: 19 June 1998 (age 28); Port of Spain, Trinidad and Tobago
- Nickname: Josh
- Batting: Right-handed
- Role: Wicket-keeper batter

International information
- National side: West Indies (2020–present)
- Test debut (cap 321): 11 December 2020 v New Zealand
- Last Test: 30 November 2024 v Bangladesh
- ODI debut (cap 198): 20 January 2021 v Bangladesh
- Last ODI: 22 January 2021 v Bangladesh

Domestic team information
- Years: Team
- 2018–present: Trinidad and Tobago
- 2020–2024: St Kitts & Nevis Patriots
- 2025–present: Trinbago Knight Riders

Career statistics
Competition	Test	ODI	FC	LA
Matches	33	2	79	30
Runs scored	1,238	14	4,124	730
Batting average	24.76	7.00	34.36	30.41
100s/50s	1/5	0/0	8/19	1/3
Top score	100*	9	152	103*
Catches/stumpings	121/6	1/1	221/11	41/4
- Source: ESPNcricinfo, 20 April 2025

Joshua Michael Da Silva (born 19 June 1998) is a Trinidadian professional cricket right-handed batter and wicket-keeper. He has represented Trinidad and Tobago since 2018 and the West Indies since 2020. As of 2026, he is signed with the Trinbago Knight Riders in the Caribbean Premier League (CPL).

== Personal life ==
Da Silva is of Portuguese descent, with his ancestors hailing from Madeira. Both his mother and paternal grandmother were Portuguese Canadians, while his father is a Trinidadian. He was educated at Saint Mary's College in Port of Spain.

== Domestic career ==
Joshua started playing cricket while attending Saint Mary's College and has also played for QPCC (Queens Park Cricket Club). He made his first-class debut for Trinidad and Tobago in the 2018–19 Regional Four Day Competition on 13 December 2018. In October 2019, he was named in the West Indies Emerging Team for the 2019–20 Regional Super50 tournament. He made his List A debut on 7 November 2019, for the West Indies Emerging Team in the 2019–20 Regional Super50 tournament. In January 2020, in the opening round of the 2019–20 West Indies Championship, Da Silva scored his maiden century in first-class cricket, with an unbeaten 113.

In July 2020, he was named in the St Kitts & Nevis Patriots squad for the 2020 Caribbean Premier League (CPL). He made his Twenty20 debut on 18 August 2020, for the St Kitts & Nevis Patriots in the 2020 CPL.

In June 2020, Da Silva was named as one of eleven reserve players in the West Indies' Test squad, for their series against England. The Test series was originally scheduled to start in May 2020, but was moved back to July 2020 due to the COVID-19 pandemic. On the third day of the third Test of the series, Da Silva was used as a substitute wicket-keeper in the match, after Shane Dowrich suffered an on-field injury.

== International career ==
In October 2020, Da Silva was named as one of six reserve players for the West Indies' Test squad for their series against New Zealand. Ahead of the second Test of the series, Da Silva was added to the squad for the match as a replacement for Shane Dowrich, who left the tour for personal reasons. He made his Test debut for the West Indies, against New Zealand, on 11 December 2020. This made him the first Caribbean-born white player to play Test cricket for the West Indies since Geoff Greenidge 50 years prior.

In December 2020, Da Silva was named in the West Indies' One Day International (ODI) squad for their series against Bangladesh, making his ODI debut against Bangladesh, on 20 January 2021.

In March 2022, Da Silva scored his maiden Test century, at St George's in Grenada, against England.

In October 2022 Da Silva was named in the West Indies Squad for the 2-match Test series in Australia scheduled for December 2022. Da Silva started the tour against the PM's XI with scores of 25 and 52* with the bat and taking 2 catches and a stumping with the gloves, in a match that ended in a draw. In the first Test in Perth that the West Indies ended up losing, Da Silva took 3 catches but struggled with the bat, combining for 12 runs off both innings.

On 10 May 2023 Da Silva was named captain of the Windies A for their upcoming tour of Bangladesh.

On the 20th of December 2023 Da Silva was named in the West Indies test squad to tour Australia in January 2024. Da Silva scored a century in the tour match against the Cricket Australia XI in an eventual draw. In the first test in Adelaide, Da Silva completed his 100th dismissal in test cricket after catching Cameron Green off Shemar Joseph's bowling. However he struggled with the bat scoring combining for only 24 runs in his 2 innings. In the second test at Brisbane, Da Silva scored a match-winning 79. He partnered Kavem Hodge for a 149-run 6th wicket partnership which ultimately brought the West Indies to a competitive first innings total. During the course of the match, he also effected 6 wickets, as West Indies defeated Australia by 8 runs.
