= Indian cricket team in South Africa in 1996–97 =

International cricket tour

India in South Africa 1996-97
	South Africa	India
- Dates: 21 December 1996 – 30 January 1997
Captains	Hansie Cronje	Sachin Tendulkar

Test series
- Result: South Africa won the 3-match series 2–0
Most runs	Brian McMillan (296)	Rahul Dravid (277)
Most wickets	Allan Donald (20)	Javagal Srinath (18)
- Player of the series: Allan Donald (SA)

The Indian cricket team toured South Africa during the 1996–97 season, playing three Tests from 21 December 1996 to 30 January 1997. Prior to the series, India toured South Africa in the 1992–93 season, losing the Test series 0–1. India was led by Sachin Tendulkar while South Africa was led by Hansie Cronje. The series was Tendulkar's first overseas Test tour as captain and third overall. The tour began with a Test series (named Castle Lager Series for sponsorship reasons), consisting of three matches. South Africa won the first two matches by a huge margin, thereby winning the series 2–0, while the final Test ended in a draw. At the end of the series, Brian McMillan of South Africa emerged as the top run-scorer with 296 runs, with an average of 98.66. He was closely followed by fellow team member Daryl Cullinan with 291 runs and India's Rahul Dravid (277 runs). Allan Donald and Javagal Srinath finished the series as top wicket-takers capturing 20 and 18 wickets respectively. The former was named "man of the series".

The Test series was followed by a triangular One-Day tournament, which included Zimbabwe as the third team. South Africa won all its round-robin matches, and played against India in the finals; they defeated India by 17 runs to win the title. Donald once again ended up as the leading wicket-taker in the tournament with 18 wickets, while Cronje was declared "man of the series".

== Squads ==
Tests		ODIs	
South Africa	India	South Africa	India
Hansie Cronje (c); Gary Kirsten (vc); Paul Adams; Adam Bacher; Daryll Cullinan; Allan Donald; Herschelle Gibbs; Andrew Hudson; Jacques Kallis; Lance Klusener; Brian McMillan; Shaun Pollock; Dave Richardson (wk)	Sachin Tendulkar (c); Anil Kumble (vc); Mohammad Azharuddin; Pankaj Dharmani (wk); Rahul Dravid; Dodda Ganesh; Sourav Ganguly; David Johnson; Saba Karim (wk); VVS Laxman; Nayan Mongia (wk); Venkatesh Prasad; Venkatapathy Raju; Woorkeri Raman; Vikram Rathour; Javagal Srinath	Hansie Cronje (c); Gary Kirsten (vc); Paul Adams; Adam Bacher; Rudi Bryson; Daryll Cullinan; Allan Donald; Jacques Kallis; Lance Klusener; Andrew Hudson; Craig Matthews; ~~Brian McMillan~~; Shaun Pollock; Dave Richardson (wk); Jonty Rhodes; Pat Symcox	Sachin Tendulkar (c); Anil Kumble (vc); Salil Ankola; Mohammad Azharuddin; Rahul Dravid; Dodda Ganesh; Sourav Ganguly; Ajay Jadeja; Sunil Joshi; Saba Karim (wk); Nayan Mongia (wk); Venkatesh Prasad; Vikram Rathour; Robin Singh; Javagal Srinath

The South Africa squad announced for the first two Tests excluded regulars Jonty Rhodes, Fanie de Villiers and Pat Symcox. Rhodes was omitted owing to an injury and concerns over suitability of his form for Test cricket, Symcox over the use of two spinners on bouncy wickets; Paul Adams made the team, while de Villiers' exclusion went unexplained by the team management. Derek Crookes, Nicky Boje, John Commins, who were members of the team's tour of India earlier that season, were also excluded. Shaun Pollock, who missed his made the squad upon recovering from a heel injury. Jacques Kallis was also included alongside uncapped Transvaal player Adam Bacher. Their ODI squad was announced on 20 January 1997. Rhodes was recalled to the side following good performances for Natal in the domestic circuit. After good performances in the Test series, Kallis was recalled. After the squad was announced, Brian McMillan ruled out with an inflamed tendon in his left foot; Craig Matthews was named as his replacement. Matthews injured his ankle during the second game and was replaced by Rudi Bryson.

A 16-member India squad was announced for the Test series. Sachin Tendulkar was retained as the captain; Sunil Dev was named manager for the tour. Navjot Singh Sidhu and Vinod Kambli were not considered for selection due to disciplinary reasons, while Ajay Jadeja, Sunil Joshi, Wasim Jaffer, Sanjay Manjrekar and Abey Kuruvilla were left out from the squad. Overall, four seam bowlers and two spinners made the squad. However, the inclusion of three wicket-keepers including uncapped player Pankaj Dharmani attracted criticism. Jadeja and Joshi were later brought in for the triangular ODI series, along with Robin Singh and Salil Ankola, who replaced Dharmani, David Johnson, Venkatapathy Raju and Woorkeri Raman of the Test side.

== Tour matches ==
=== Three-day: Eastern Province v Indians ===
21–23 December 1996
Scorecard

Indians	v	Eastern Province
335/6d (101 overs); Sourav Ganguly 97 (204); Nantie Hayward 2/62 (23 overs)		322/4 (84.5 overs); Kepler Wessels 103* (182); Venkatesh Prasad 1/32 (15 overs)
130/2 (32 overs); Vikram Rathour 64 (77); Nantie Hayward 1/22 (7 overs)

Match drawn
St George's Park, Port Elizabeth
Umpires: Cyril Mitchley and Dave Orchard

- Indians won the toss and elected to bat.
- Sourav Ganguly and Rahul Dravid (both Indians), and Kepler Wessels and Mark Rushmere (both Eastern Province) passed 4,000, 5,000, 23,000 and 7,000 runs respectively in first-class cricket.
- Venkatesh Prasad (Indians) picked his 150th wicket in first-class cricket.

=== 55-over: Natal Invitation XI v Indians ===
30 December 1996
Scorecard

Natal Invitation XI; 288/5 (55 overs)	v	Indians; 236/7 (55 overs)
Neil Johnson 80 (112); Woorkeri Raman 2/28 (5 overs)		Rahul Dravid 64 (81); Neil Johnson 2/25 (7 overs)

Natal Invitation XI won by 52 runs
Kingsmead, Durban
Umpires: Wilf Diedricks and Rudi Koertzen

- Natal Invitation XI won the toss and elected to bat.

=== 50-over: Griqualand West v Indians ===
9 January 1997
Scorecard

Griqualand West; 205/7 (50 overs)	v	Indians; 206/3 (35 overs)
Willie Dry 72 (85); David Johnson 3/26 (10 overs)		Sourav Ganguly 101 (85); Martyn Gidley 2/15 (7 overs)

Indians won by 7 wickets
De Beers Diamond Oval, Kimberley
Umpires: Danzel Becker and Barry Lambson
Player of the match: Sourav Ganguly (Indians)

- Griqualand West won the toss and elected to bat.
- Pieter Barnard (Griqualand West) and Rahul Dravid (Indians) passed 1,000 and 2,000 runs respectively in first-class cricket.

=== Three-day: Free State v Indians ===
11–13 January 1997
Scorecard

Free State	v	Indians
320/7d (87.4 overs); Boeta Dippenaar 96 (170); David Johnson 5/78 (23.4 overs)		296/6d (97.4 overs); Vikram Rathour 115 (203); Bradley Player 2/37 (19 overs)
259/2d (60.3 overs); Gerhardus Liebenberg 133* (176); Sourav Ganguly 1/47 (10 overs)		185/6 (64 overs); Vikram Rathour 50 (78); Nicky Boje 3/60 (21 overs)

Match drawn
Goodyear Park, Bloemfontein
Umpires: Robert Brooks, Brian Jerling and Barry Lambson

- Free State won the toss and elected to bat.
- David Johnson (Indians) claimed his 100th wicket in first-class cricket.

=== 50-over: South Africa A v Indians ===
30 January 1997
Scorecard

South Africa A 251/6 (50 overs)	v	Indians; 94/5 (24.2 overs)
Louis Koen 105 (134); Venkatesh Prasad 2/42 (10 overs)		Sachin Tendulkar 37 (37); Piet Botha 2/18 (6 overs)

No result
Jan Smuts Stadium, Pietermaritzburg
Umpires: Robert Brooks and Brian Jerling

- South Africa A won the toss and elected to bat.
- The match was abandoned due to rain.

== Test matches ==
=== 1st Test ===
26–28 December 1996
Scorecard

South Africa	v	India
235 (86 overs); Andrew Hudson 80 (191); Venkatesh Prasad 5/60 (19 overs)		100 (39.1 overs); Sourav Ganguly 16 (45); Allan Donald 5/40 (16 overs)
259 (70 overs); Adam Bacher 55 (101); Venkatesh Prasad 5/93 (25 overs)		66 (34.1 overs); Rahul Dravid 27 (73); Allan Donald 4/14 (11.1 overs)

South Africa won by 328 runs
Kingsmead, Durban
Umpires: Steve Dunne (NZ) and Dave Orchard (SA)
Player of the match: Andrew Hudson (SA)

- India won the toss and elected to field.
- Adam Bacher (SA) made his Test debut.
- India's second innings total of 66 was their lowest against South Africa in Tests, and fourth overall.
- Nayan Mongia broke the record for effecting most dismissals by an India wicket-keeper in a Test.

After India won the toss and elected to field first, South Africa were bowled out for 235 runs. India managed just 100 runs in their first innings. South Africa in their second innings made 259, setting a target of 395 for India. India ended up scoring 66 runs, their fourth lowest total in Tests, thereby losing the match by 328 runs.

=== 2nd Test ===
2–6 January 1997
Scorecard

South Africa	v	India
529/7d (162.5 overs); Gary Kirsten 103 (204); Venkatesh Prasad 3/114 (36 overs)		359 (92.2 overs); Sachin Tendulkar 169 (254); Paul Adams 2/49 (18 overs)
256/6d (72 overs); Brian McMillan 59 (76); Javagal Srinath 3/78 (18 overs)		144 (66.2 overs); VVS Laxman 35 (109); Allan Donald 3/40 (18 overs)

South Africa won by 282 runs
Newlands, Cape Town
Umpires: Darrell Hair (Aus) and Rudi Koertzen (SA)
Player of the match: Brian McMillan (SA)

- South Africa won the toss and elected to bat.
- Dodda Ganesh (Ind) made his Test debut.
- Lance Klusener scored his first century in Tests. It was the fastest by a South Africa player in terms of balls faced (100).
- Lance Klusener and Brian McMillan's partnership of 147 in their first innings was the highest for South Africa for the eighth wicket in Tests, before it was surpassed by Mark Boucher and Shaun Pollock in 1999 (148).
- South Africa's first innings total of 529 was their highest in Tests since readmission, before they made 552 the following year.
- Sachin Tendulkar and Mohammad Azharuddin's partnership of 222 in their first innings is India's record for the sixth wicket in away Tests.

=== 3rd Test ===
16–20 January 1997
Scorecard

India	v	South Africa
410 (150.3 overs); Rahul Dravid 148 (362); Lance Klusener 3/75 (27 overs)		321 (89.1 overs); Shaun Pollock 79 (158); Javagal Srinath 5/104 (25.1 overs)
266/8d (83 overs); Rahul Dravid 81 (146); Allan Donald 3/38 (18 overs)		228/8 (68 overs); Daryl Cullinan 122* (200); Anil Kumble 3/40 (23 overs)

Match drawn
New Wanderers Stadium, Johannesburg
Umpires: Cyril Mitchley (SA) and Peter Willey (Eng)
Player of the match: Rahul Dravid (Ind)

- India won the toss and elected to bat.
- Rahul Dravid (Ind) scored his first century in Tests.

South Africa appealed for bad light and escaped defeat.

== See also ==
- 1996–97 Standard Bank International One-Day Series
