= 1996–97 Standard Bank International One-Day Series =

International cricket tournament

1996-97 Standard Bank International One-Day Series
- Part of the Indian cricket team in South Africa in 1996–97
- Date: 23 January – 13 February 1997
- Location: South Africa
- Result: Won by South Africa
- Player of the series: Hansie Cronje
Teams
South Africa	India	Zimbabwe
Captains
Hansie Cronje	Sachin Tendulkar	Alistair Campbell
Most runs
Daryll Cullinan (300)	Rahul Dravid (280)	Grant Flower (248)
Most wickets
Allan Donald (18)	Anil Kumble (10)	Eddo Brandes (12)

The Standard Bank International Series was the name of the One Day International cricket tournament in South Africa for the 1996-97 season. It was a tri-nation series between South Africa, India and Zimbabwe.

South Africa booked a slot into the Finals through six straight wins. The slot for the second finalist came down to wire being decided in the last league match between India and Zimbabwe. India had to beat Zimbabwe to equal their points tally. They also needed to chase down the target set by Zimbabwe within 40.5 overs to ensure a slot in the Finals on the basis of Net run rate. India managed to chase the target within 40 overs thereby, moving into the Finals. South Africa beat India in the Finals to clinch the trophy.

== Squads ==
South Africa	India	Zimbabwe
Hansie Cronje (c); Gary Kirsten; Andrew Hudson; Adam Bacher; Daryll Cullinan; Jonty Rhodes; Jacques Kallis; ~~Brian McMillan~~; Shaun Pollock; Lance Klusener; Dave Richardson (wk); Rudi Bryson; Pat Symcox; Craig Matthews; Allan Donald; Paul Adams	Sachin Tendulkar (c); Vikram Rathour; Rahul Dravid; Sourav Ganguly; Mohammad Azharuddin; Ajay Jadeja; Pankaj Dharmani; Nayan Mongia (wk); Robin Singh; Javagal Srinath; Sunil Joshi; Anil Kumble; Salil Ankola; Dodda Ganesh; Venkatesh Prasad; Saba Karim (wk)	Alistair Campbell (c); Andy Flower (wk); Eddo Brandes; Stuart Carlisle; Craig Evans; Grant Flower; Dave Houghton; Everton Matambanadzo; John Rennie; Paul Strang; Heath Streak; Andy Waller; Andy Whittall; Guy Whittall; Craig Wishart

The South Africa squad was announced on 20 January 1997. Jonty Rhodes was recalled to the side following good performances for Natal in the domestic circuit. Other inclusions included all-rounder Jacques Kallis and Pat Symcox to the side that played India in the Test series that preceded the tournament. To its squad, India named Ajay Jadeja and Robin Singh as inclusions. All-rounder Brian McMillan of South Africa was ruled out of the tournament with an inflamed tendon in his left foot and Craig Matthews was named as his replacement. Matthews injured his ankle during the second game and was replaced by Rudi Bryson.

== Group stage points table ==
South Africa won all of their six round-robin matches. India and Zimbabwe each claimed one victory over the other. The third match between the two teams ended in a tie. Tied at 3 points each, India qualified for the final against South Africa based on superior run-rate.

Team	Pld	W	L	T	NR	Pts	NRR
South Africa	6	6	0	0	0	12	+0.393
India	6	1	4	1	0	3	−0.178
Zimbabwe	6	1	4	1	0	3	−0.233

== Group stage matches ==
=== 1st match ===
23 January 1997 (D/N)
Scorecard

South Africa; 270/4 (50 overs)	v	India; 231 (47.4 overs)
G Kirsten 73 (99); BKV Prasad 2/63 (10 overs)		SS Karim 55 (48); L Klusener 5/42 (8.4 overs)

South Africa won by 39 runs
Goodyear Park, Bloemfontein
Umpires: SB Lambson (SA) and CJ Mitchley (SA)
Player of the match: JN Rhodes (SA)

- South Africa won the toss and elected to bat.
- SS Karim (IND) made his ODI debut.

=== 2nd match ===
25 January 1997 (D/N)
Scorecard

Zimbabwe; 211 (48.5 overs)	v	South Africa; 212/5 (46.1 overs)
GW Flower 90 (126); AA Donald 4/37 (9.5 overs)		WJ Cronje 87* (128); JA Rennie 2/28 (7 overs)

South Africa won by 5 wickets
Centurion Park, Centurion, Gauteng
Umpires: DF Becker (SA) and CJ Mitchley (SA)
Player of the match: DJ Cullinan (SA)

- Zimbabwe won the toss and elected to bat.

=== 3rd match ===
27 January 1997 (D/N)
Scorecard

Zimbabwe; 236/8 (50 overs)	v	India; 236 (49.5 overs)
ADR Campbell 61 (70); BKV Prasad 3/49 (10 overs)		RR Singh 48 (31); EA Brandes 5/41 (9.5 overs)

Match tied
Boland Park, Paarl
Umpires: WA Diedricks (SA) and RE Koertzen (SA)
Player of the match: RR Singh (IND) and EA Brandes (ZIM)

- Zimbabwe won the toss and elected to bat.

=== 4th match ===
29 January 1997 (D/N)
Scorecard

Zimbabwe; 226/6 (50 overs)	v	South Africa; 229/5 (47 overs)
DL Houghton 57* (44); SM Pollock 2/50 (10 overs)		G Kirsten 55 (88); JA Rennie 2/51 (10 overs)

South Africa won by 5 wickets
Newlands, Cape Town
Umpires: RE Koertzen (SA) and DL Orchard (SA)
Player of the match: DL Houghton (ZIM)

- Zimbabwe won the toss and elected to bat.
- RE Bryson (SA) made his ODI debut.

=== 5th match ===
31 January 1997 (D/N)
Scorecard

Zimbabwe; 256/8 (50 overs)	v	South Africa; 259/6 (48.3 overs)
GW Flower 62 (93); AA Donald 4/46 (10 overs)		SM Pollock 75 (85); EA Brandes 3/45 (10 overs)

South Africa won by 4 wickets
New Wanderers, Johannesburg
Umpires: DF Becker (SA) and SB Lambson (SA)
Player of the match: WJ Cronje (SA)

- Zimbabwe won the toss and elected to bat.

=== 6th match ===
2 February 1997
Scorecard

India; 179/9 (50 overs)	v	South Africa; 180/4 (45.1 overs)
M Azharuddin 57 (93); AA Donald 3/40 (10 overs)		JH Kallis 79 (127); RR Singh 2/34 (10 overs)

South Africa won by 6 wickets
St George's Park Cricket Ground, Port Elizabeth
Umpires: RE Koertzen (SA) and DL Orchard (SA)
Player of the match: JH Kallis (SA)

- India won the toss and elected to bat.
- AM Bacher (SA) made his ODI debut.

=== 7th match ===
4 February 1997 (D/N)
Scorecard

India; 232/5 (50 overs)	v	South Africa; 236/4 (49.2 overs)
SC Ganguly 83 (136); L Klusener 2/58 (10 overs)		G Kirsten 82 (117); A Kumble 1/36 (10 overs)

South Africa won by 6 wickets
Buffalo Park, East London
Umpires: WA Diedricks (SA) and DL Orchard (SA)
Player of the match: SC Ganguly (IND) and G Kirsten (SA)

- India won the toss and elected to bat.

=== 8th match ===
7 February 1997 (D/N)
Scorecard

India; 216 (48.4 overs)	v	Zimbabwe; 171/7 (33.4 overs)
M Azharuddin 44 (67); EA Brandes 2/44 (9.4 overs)		CN Evans 43 (47); RR Singh 2/18 (7 overs)

Zimbabwe won by 3 wickets (revised target)
Centurion Park, Centurion, Gauteng
Umpires: DF Becker (SA) and CJ Mitchley (SA)
Player of the match: CN Evans and PA Strang (both ZIM)

- India won the toss and elected to bat.
- Zimbabwe target was 171 runs in 34 overs.

=== 9th match ===
9 February 1997
Scorecard

Zimbabwe; 240/8 (50 overs)	v	India; 241/4 (39.2 overs)
ADR Campbell 86 (108); J Srinath 3/35 (10 overs)		SR Tendulkar 104 (97); JA Rennie 2/36 (9 overs)

India won by 6 wickets
Willowmoore Park, Benoni, Gauteng
Umpires: DF Becker (SA) and WA Diedricks (SA)
Player of the match: SR Tendulkar (IND)

- India won the toss and elected to field.
- India's target in order to qualify for the final was 241 runs off 40.5 overs.

== Finals ==
=== 1st final ===
12 February 1997 (D/N)
Scorecard

India; 191/9 (50 overs)	v	South Africa; 42/1 (14.3 overs)
Mohammad Azharuddin 60 (81); Allan Donald 2/23 (10 overs)		Gary Kirsten 20* (41); Javagal Srinath 1/12 (7 overs)

No result
Kingsmead Cricket Ground, Durban
Umpires: Rudi Koertzen (SA) and Cyril Mitchley (SA)
Player of the match: No award made

- India won the toss and elected to bat.
- Match abandoned due to rain. Re-scheduled for 13 February.

=== 2nd final ===
13 February 1997 (D/N)
Scorecard

South Africa; 278/8 (50 overs)	v	India; 234 (39.2 overs)
Daryll Cullinan 60 (51); Venkatesh Prasad 2/43 (10 overs)		Rahul Dravid 84 (94); Allan Donald 3/48 (7.2 overs)

South Africa won by 16 runs (revised target)
Kingsmead Cricket Ground, Durban
Umpires: Rudi Koertzen (SA) and Cyril Mitchley (SA)
Player of the match: Rahul Dravid (IND)

- South Africa won the toss and elected to bat.
- India's target was revised to 251 in 40 overs due to rain.
