= South African cricket team in India in 1996–97 =

International cricket tour

	India	South Africa
- Dates: 17 October – 14 December 1996
Captains	Sachin Tendulkar	Hansie Cronje

Test series
- Result: India won the 3-match series 2–1
Most runs	Mohammad Azharuddin (388)	Gary Kirsten (322)
Most wickets	Javagal Srinath (17)	Paul Adams (14)
- Player of the series: Mohammad Azharuddin (Ind)

One Day International series
- Results: India won the 1-match series 1–0
Most runs	Sachin Tendulkar (114)	Andrew Hudson (45)
Most wickets	Venkatesh Prasad (4)	Paul Adams (2)
- Player of the series: —

The South African cricket team toured India during the 1996–97 cricket season, playing three Test matches and one One Day International (ODI). The tour was South Africa's second international cricket series in India, following a visit in 1991–92, and included their first Test appearances against India on the subcontinent. India had previously toured South Africa in 1992–93, losing the Test series 0–1.

The tour began with the Titan Cup, a triangular ODI tournament which included Australia on 17 October 1996. South Africa won all its round-robin matches—three each against India and Australia—but lost to India in the final. India's Sachin Tendulkar was the leading run-scorer in the tournament with 320 runs. South Africa's Allan Donald was the highest wicket-taker with 17 wickets and received the player of the series award.

India won the Test series, winning the first and third match. Several players, including Herschelle Gibbs, Lance Klusener and VVS Laxman, made their Test debuts. Laxman scored a fifty in the second innings of the first Test and Klusener picked up eight wickets for 64 runs in the second innings of the second Test at Kolkata. The figures remain the fourth best by any bowler on debut. Mohammad Azharuddin was named the Man of the Test series after scoring 388 runs at an average of 77.60; Javagal Srinath was the most successful bowler collecting 17 wickets at an average of 20.94.

At the end of the tour, South Africa played India in a benefit match for Mohinder Amarnath at the Wankhede Stadium in Mumbai. India won the ODI by 74 runs; Tendulkar went on to score 114 and was selected the man of the match.

== Tour matches ==
=== Three-day: Karnataka v South Africans ===
10–12 November 1996
Scorecard

South Africans	v	Karnataka
243 (53.1 overs); Jonty Rhodes 46 (60); Rangarao Ananth 4/72 (17 overs)		115 (49 overs); Fazal Khaleel 32 (67); Lance Klusener 5/38 (15 overs)
234 (73.5 overs); Hansie Cronje 49 (70); Anand Katti 4/68 (17.5 overs)		117 (49.4 overs); J. Arunkumar 33 (51); Allan Donald 3/29 (11 overs)

South Africans won by 245 runs
Nehru Stadium, Kochi
Umpires: SCR Vijayaraghavan and P. Radhakrishnan
Player of the match: Hansie Cronje (South Africans)

- South Africans won the toss and elected to bat.
- Daryll Cullinan (South Africans) passed 8,000 runs in first-class matches.

=== Three-day: Indian Board President's XI v South Africa ===
15–17 November 1996
Scorecard

Indian Board President's XI	v	South Africans
179 (61.1 overs); Salil Ankola 63 (62); Fanie de Villiers 5/46 (16 overs)		206 (82.3 overs); Herschelle Gibbs 74 (153); Venkatapathy Raju 6/64 (31.3 overs)
94 (35.3 overs); VVS Laxman 27 (40); Fanie de Villiers 4/37 (13 overs)		70/0 (16.4 overs); Gary Kirsten 37* (49)

South Africans won by 10 wickets
IPCL Sports Complex Ground, Vadodara
Umpires: Jasbir Singh and Deepak Kumar Kar

- Indian Board President's XI won the toss and elected to bat.
- Herschelle Gibbs (South Africans) passed 3,000 runs in first-class matches.
- Venkatapathy Raju (Indian Board President's XI) claimed his 350th wicket in first-class matches.

=== Three-day: India A v South Africans ===
3–5 December 1996
Scorecard

South Africans	v	India A
384/5d (91 overs); Herschelle Gibbs 200* (287); Dodda Ganesh 3/69 (23 overs)		340 (77.5 overs); Vinod Kambli 98 (101); Paul Adams 5/108 (24.5 overs)
492/3d (99 overs); Herschelle Gibbs 171 (220); Woorkeri Raman 1/34 (7 overs)

Match drawn
Vidarbha Cricket Association Stadium, Nagpur
Umpires: Devendra Sharma and Suresh Shastri

- South Africans won the toss and elected to bat.
- Brian McMillan (South Africans) passed 6,000 runs in first-class matches.
- Herschelle Gibbs' (South Africans) scored his highest individual score in first-class matches (200), surpassing his 183 against MCC.

== Test series ==
=== First Test ===
20–24 November 1996
Scorecard

India	v	South Africa
223 (99 overs); Sachin Tendulkar 42 (64); Allan Donald 4/37 (27 overs)		244 (98.1 overs); Fanie de Villiers 67* (136); Sunil Joshi 4/43 (24 overs)
190 (79.2 overs); VVS Laxman 51 (125); Paul Adams 3/30 (9.2 overs)		105 (38.5 overs); Hansie Cronje 48* (122); Javagal Srinath 6/21 (11.5 overs)

India won by 64 runs
Gujarat Stadium, Ahmedabad
Umpires: S. K. Bansal (Ind) and George Sharp (Eng)
Player of the match: Javagal Srinath (Ind)

- India won the toss and elected to bat.
- VVS Laxman (Ind) made his Test debut.
- Mohammad Azharuddin (Ind) became the first player to play against all other Test playing nations, both home and away (then eight).

=== Second Test ===
27 November–1 December 1996
Scorecard

South Africa	v	India
428 (121.1 overs); Andrew Hudson 146 (244); Venkatesh Prasad 6/104 (35 overs)		329 (81.2 overs); Mohammad Azharuddin 109 (77); Allan Donald 3/72 (21.2 overs)
367/3d (93.2 overs); Daryl Cullinan 153* (261); Javagal Srinath 1/101 (24.2 overs)		137 (53.3 overs); Mohammad Azharuddin 52 (55); Lance Klusener 8/64 (21.3 overs)

South Africa won by 329 runs
Eden Gardens, Kolkata
Umpires: B. C. Cooray (Ind) and V. K. Ramaswamy (Ind)
Player of the match: Gary Kirsten (SA)

- Herschelle Gibbs, Lance Klusener (Both SA) made their Test debut.

=== Third Test ===
8–12 December 1996
Scorecard

India	v	South Africa
237 (100.1 overs); Sachin Tendulkar 63 (171); Paul Adams 6/55 (19.1 overs)		177 (72.3 overs); Gary Kirsten 43 (108); Anil Kumble 4/71 (27 overs)
400/7d (126 overs); Mohammad Azharuddin 163* (229); Fanie de Villiers 2/58 (24 overs)		180 (96.1 overs); Hansie Cronje 50 (95); Javagal Srinath 3/38 (19.1 overs)

India won by 280 runs
Green Park Stadium, Kanpur
Umpires: David Shepherd and Srinivas Venkataraghavan
Player of the match: Mohammad Azharuddin (Ind)

== One Day International Match ==
=== Only ODI ===
14 December 1996
Scorecard

India; 267/6 (50 overs)	v	South Africa; 193 (46 overs)
Sachin Tendulkar 114 (126); Paul Adams 2/50 (7 overs)		Andrew Hudson 45 (60); Venkatesh Prasad 4/27 (8 overs)

India won by 74 runs
Wankhede Stadium, Mumbai
Umpires: K. Parthasarathy and Subroto Porel
Player of the match: Sachin Tendulkar (Ind)

- India won the toss and elected to bat.
- Hansie Cronje (SA) played his 50th ODI as captain of South Africa and 100th overall.
- Play was suspended for 19–20 minutes during India's innings due to crowd trouble.
- Sachin Tendulkar (Ind) scored his 10th century in ODIs.
- Javagal Srinath (Ind) claimed his 150th wicket in ODIs.
