= Australian cricket team in South Africa in 1996–97 =

International cricket tour

	South Africa	Australia
- Dates: 13 February 1997 – 13 April 1997
Captains	WJ Cronje	MA Taylor (Tests and 1st-2nd ODIs); IA Healy (3rd-6th ODIs); SR Waugh (7th ODI)

Test series
- Result: Australia won the 3-match series 2–1
Most runs	WJ Cronje (204)	SR Waugh (313)
Most wickets	AA Donald (11)	JN Gillespie (14)
- Player of the series: SR Waugh (AUS)

One Day International series
- Results: Australia won the 7-match series 4–3
Most runs	DJ Cullinan (334)	SR Waugh (301)
Most wickets	SM Pollock (12)	SK Warne (10)
- Player of the series: SM Pollock (SA)

The Australia national cricket team toured South Africa during the 1996–97 season and played a three-match Test series and a seven-match One Day International series against the South Africa national cricket team.

Australia was led in the Test series by Mark Taylor while South Africa was led by Hansie Cronje.

Australia won the Test series 2–1 and the ODI series 4–3.

Steve Waugh of Australia emerged as the top run-scorer in the Test series with 313 runs, with an average of 78.25. Jason Gillespie finished the series as top wicket-taker with 13 wickets. Steve Waugh was named "man of the Test series".

== Squad ==
Tests	ODIs	
Australia	South Africa	Australia
Mark Taylor (c); Matthew Elliott; Matthew Hayden; Justin Langer; Mark Waugh; Steve Waugh; Greg Blewett; Michael Bevan; Ian Healy; Shane Warne; Andy Bichel; Paul Reiffel; Glenn McGrath; Jason Gillespie	Hansie Cronje (c); Adam Bacher; Louis Koen; Jacques Kallis; Daryll Cullinan; Jonty Rhodes; Herschelle Gibbs; Shaun Pollock; Lance Klusener; Dave Richardson; Pat Symcox; Derek Crookes; Allan Donald; Rudi Bryson	Ian Healy (c); Mark Taylor; Mark Waugh; Steve Waugh; Greg Blewett; Michael Bevan; Shane Warne; Andy Bichel; Paul Reiffel; Jason Gillespie; Adam Dale; Michael di Venuto; Brendon Julian; Stuart Law

Adam Gilchrist was brought in due to Ian Healy's suspension from the first two one-day internationals.

== Test matches ==
=== 1st Test ===
28 February–4 March 1997
Scorecard

South Africa	v	Australia
302 (91.4 overs); WJ Cronje 76 (144); GD McGrath 4/77 (26 overs)		628/8d (193.4 overs); GS Blewett 214 (421); SM Pollock 2/105 (32 overs)
130 (69 overs); JH Kallis 39 (155); MG Bevan 4/32 (15 overs)

Australia won by an innings and 196 runs
New Wanderers, Johannesburg
Umpires: CJ Mitchley (SA) and S Venkataraghavan (IND)
Player of the match: SR Waugh and GS Blewett (AUS)

- South Africa won the toss and elected to bat.

=== 2nd Test ===
14–17 March 1997
Scorecard

South Africa	v	Australia
209 (74.4 overs); BM McMillan 55 (108); JN Gillespie 5/54 (23 overs)		108 (70.4 overs); MTG Elliott 23 (121); SM Pollock 2/6 (6 overs)
168 (73.4 overs); AM Bacher 49 (129); MG Bevan 3/18 (13 overs)		271/8 (93.3 overs); ME Waugh 116 (228); JH Kallis 3/29 (16 overs)

Australia won by 2 wickets
St George's Park Cricket Ground, Port Elizabeth
Umpires: RE Koertzen (SA) and S Venkataraghavan (IND)
Player of the match: ME Waugh (AUS)

- Australia won the toss and elected to field.
- The match was scheduled for five days but completed in four.

=== 3rd Test ===
21–24 March 1997
Scorecard

Australia	v	South Africa
227 (89.5 overs); SR Waugh 67 (132); BN Schultz 4/52 (20 overs)		384 (134.4 overs); AM Bacher 96 (322); GD McGrath 6/86 (40.4 overs)
185 (73.4 overs); SR Waugh 60* (179); AA Donald 5/36 (18 overs)		32/2 (6.4 overs); DJ Cullinan 12* (9); GS Blewett 1/13 (3 overs)

South Africa won by 8 wickets
Centurion Park, Centurion, Gauteng
Umpires: MJ Kitchen (ENG) and CJ Mitchley (SA)
Player of the match: AA Donald (SA)

- South Africa won the toss and elected to field.
- The match was scheduled for five days but completed in four.

== ODI series summary ==
=== 1st ODI ===
29 March 1997
Scorecard

Australia; 223/9 (50 overs)	v	South Africa; 227/4 (47 overs)
MG Bevan 51* (60); L Klusener 2/29 (6 overs)		DJ Cullinan 85* (116); SK Warne 2/36 (10 overs)

South Africa won by 6 wickets
Buffalo Park, East London
Umpires: CJ Mitchley and DL Orchard
Player of the match: DJ Cullinan (SA)

- South Africa won the toss and elected to field.
- AC Dale and MJ Di Venuto (both AUS) made their ODI debuts.

=== 2nd ODI ===
31 March 1997
Scorecard

South Africa; 221/8 (50 overs)	v	Australia; 222/3 (45 overs)
JH Kallis 82 (119); AC Dale 3/18 (7 overs)		ME Waugh 115* (125); PL Symcox 2/65 (10 overs)

Australia won by 7 wickets
St George's Park Cricket Ground, Port Elizabeth
Umpires: RE Koertzen and CJ Mitchley
Player of the match: ME Waugh (AUS)

- Australia won the toss and elected to field.
- LJ Koen (SA) made his ODI debut.

=== 3rd ODI ===
2 April 1997 (D/N)
Scorecard

South Africa; 245/8 (50 overs)	v	Australia; 199 (44.5 overs)
JN Rhodes 83* (76); JN Gillespie 2/39 (10 overs)		MG Bevan 82 (102); RE Bryson 2/34 (9 overs)

South Africa won by 46 runs
Newlands Cricket Ground, Cape Town
Umpires: RE Koertzen and DL Orchard
Player of the match: JN Rhodes (SA)

- Australia won the toss and elected to field.

=== 4th ODI ===
5 April 1997 (D/N)
Scorecard

Australia; 211/9 (50 overs)	v	South Africa; 196 (48.1 overs)
AC Gilchrist 77 (88); SM Pollock 4/33 (10 overs)		AM Bacher 45 (76); AJ Bichel 3/43 (10 overs)

Australia won by 15 runs
Kingsmead Cricket Ground, Durban
Umpires: WA Diedricks and DL Orchard
Player of the match: SM Pollock (SA)

- Australia won the toss and elected to bat.

=== 5th ODI ===
8 April 1997 (D/N)
Scorecard

Australia; 258/7 (50 overs)	v	South Africa; 250/8 (50 overs)
MJ Di Venuto 89 (114); AA Donald 3/67 (10 overs)		JH Kallis 55 (67); JN Gillespie 2/46 (10 overs)

Australia won by 8 runs
New Stadium, Johannesburg
Umpires: DF Becker and SB Lambson
Player of the match: MJ Di Venuto (AUS)

- Australia won the toss and elected to bat.

=== 6th ODI ===
10 April 1997 (D/N)
Scorecard

South Africa; 284/7 (50 overs)	v	Australia; 287/5 (49 overs)
DJ Cullinan 89 (96); SK Warne 2/52 (10 overs)		MG Bevan 103 (95); SM Pollock 3/40 (10 overs)

Australia won by 5 wickets
Centurion Park, Centurion, Gauteng
Umpires: DF Becker and SB Lambson
Player of the match: MG Bevan (AUS)

- South Africa won the toss and elected to bat.

=== 7th ODI ===
13 April 1997
Scorecard

South Africa; 310/6 (50 overs)	v	Australia; 201 (37 overs)
L Klusener 92 (118); AJ Bichel 2/50 (10 overs)		SR Waugh 91 (79); L Klusener 3/41 (7 overs)

South Africa won by 109 runs
Goodyear Park, Bloemfontein
Umpires: WA Diedricks and RE Koertzen
Player of the match: L Klusener (SA)

- Australia won the toss and elected to field.
