= List of South Africa ODI cricketers =

This is a list of South African One-day International cricketers. The list is arranged in the order in which each player won his first ODI cap. Where more than one player won his first ODI cap in the same match, those players are listed alphabetically by surname.

== Players ==
Statistics correct up to 23 March 2026

South African ODI cricketers				Batting					Bowling						Fielding	
Cap	Name	Career	Mat	Inn	NO	Runs	HS	Avg	Balls	Mdn	Runs	Wkt	Best	Avg	Ca	St
1	Jimmy Cook	1991–1993	4	4	-	67	35	16.75	-	-	-	-	-	-	1	-
2	Allan Donald	1991–2003	164	40	18	95	13	4.31	8561	101	5926	272	6-23	21.78	28	-
3	Andrew Hudson	1991–1997	89	88	1	2559	161	29.41	6	-	3	-	-	-	18	-
4	Peter Kirsten	1991–1994	40	40	6	1293	97	38.02	183	1	152	6	3-31	25.33	11	-
5	Adrian Kuiper	1991–1996	25	23	7	539	63*	33.68	588	-	518	18	3-33	28.77	3	-
6	Brian McMillan	1991–1998	78	52	16	841	127	23.36	3623	33	2589	70	4-32	36.98	42	-
7	Clive Rice	1991–1991	3	2	-	26	14	13.00	138	-	114	2	1-46	57.00	-	-
8	Dave Richardson	1991–1998	122	77	33	868	53	19.72	-	-	-	-	-	-	148	17
9	Tim Shaw	1991–1994	9	6	4	26	17*	13.00	504	3	298	9	2-19	33.11	2	-
10	Richard Snell	1991–1996	42	28	8	322	63	16.10	2095	25	1574	44	5-40	35.77	7	-
11	Kepler Wessels^{1}	1991–1994	55	54	4	1627	90	32.54	12	-	11	-	-	-	30	-
12	Clive Eksteen	1991–1994	6	2	2	6	6*	-	222	3	181	2	1-26	90.50	3	-
13	Craig Matthews	1991–1997	56	22	9	141	26	10.84	3003	53	1975	79	4-10	25.00	10	-
14	Mandy Yachad	1991	1	1	-	31	31	31.00	-	-	-	-	-	-	1	-
15	Hansie Cronje	1992–2000	188	175	31	5565	112	38.64	5357	33	3966	114	5-32	34.78	73	-
16	Meyrick Pringle	1992–1994	17	8	3	48	13*	9.60	870	12	604	22	4-11	27.45	2	-
17	Jonty Rhodes	1992–2003	245	220	51	5935	121	35.11	14	-	4	-	-	-	105	-
18	Tertius Bosch	1992	2	-	-	-	-	-	51	-	66	-	-	-	-	-
19	Omar Henry	1992	3	3	1	20	11	10.00	149	-	125	2	1-31	62.50	1	-
20	Mark Rushmere	1992	4	4	-	78	35	19.50	-	-	-	-	-	-	1	-
21	Corrie van Zyl	1992	2	2	1	3	3*	3.00	108	2	93	-	-	-	-	-
22	Dave Callaghan	1992–2000	29	25	6	493	169*	25.94	444	2	365	10	3-32	36.50	6	-
23	Fanie de Villiers	1992–1997	83	36	15	170	20*	8.09	4422	86	2636	95	4-27	27.74	15	-
24	Brett Schultz	1992	1	-	-	-	-	-	54	1	35	1	1-35	35.00	-	-
25	Daryll Cullinan	1993–2000	138	133	16	3860	124	32.99	174	-	124	5	2-30	24.80	62	-
26	Errol Stewart	1993–2002	6	6	2	61	23*	15.25	-	-	-	-	-	-	5	-
27	Pat Symcox	1993–1999	80	54	13	694	61	16.92	3991	25	2762	72	4-28	38.36	23	-
28	Gary Kirsten	1993–2003	185	185	19	6798	188*	40.95	30	1	23	-	-	-	61	1
29	Dave Rundle	1994	2	2	-	6	6	3.00	96	-	95	5	4-42	19.00	3	-
30	Eric Simons	1994–1995	23	18	4	217	24	15.50	1212	21	810	33	4-42	24.54	6	-
31	Derek Crookes	1994–2000	32	23	3	296	54	14.80	1221	5	1011	25	3-30	40.44	20	-
32	Michael Rindel	1994–1999	22	22	1	575	106	27.38	270	-	242	6	2-15	40.33	8	-
33	Steven Jack	1994–1995	2	2	-	7	6	3.50	108	-	86	3	2-41	28.66	3	-
34	Nicky Boje^{2}	1995–2005	113	69	18	1410	129	27.64	4457	21	3351	95	5-21	35.27	33	-
35	Gerhardus Liebenberg	1995–1998	4	4	-	94	39	23.50	-	-	-	-	-	-	-	-
36	Rudi Steyn	1995	1	1	-	4	4	4.00	-	-	-	-	-	-	-	-
37	Paul Adams	1996–2003	24	9	5	66	33*	16.50	1109	7	815	29	3-26	28.10	7	-
38	Jacques Kallis^{4}	1996–2014	323	309	53	11550	139	45.11	10638	77	8568	269	5-30	31.85	131	-
39	Shaun Pollock^{4}	1996–2008	294	196	70	3193	90	25.34	15430	308	9409	387	6-35	24.31	104	-
40	Lance Klusener	1996–2004	171	137	50	3576	103*	41.10	7336	46	5751	192	6-49	29.95	35	-
41	Steve Palframan	1996	7	4	-	55	28	13.75	-	-	-	-	-	-	9	-
42	Herschelle Gibbs	1996–2010	248	240	16	8094	175	36.13	-	-	-	-	-	-	108	-
43	Rudi Bryson	1997	7	4	3	32	17*	32.00	378	1	323	7	2-34	46.14	1	-
44	Adam Bacher	1997–2005	13	13	-	270	56	20.76	108	-	64	3	2-36	21.33	4	-
45	Louis Koen	1997–2000	5	5	-	82	28	16.40	-	-	-	-	-	-	3	-
46	Mark Boucher^{2}	1998–2012	231	167	40	3549	147*	27.94	-	-	-	-	-	-	328	17
47	Makhaya Ntini^{3}	1998–2011	172	46	23	199	42*	8.65	8645	123	6501	265	6-22	24.53	30	-
48	Steve Elworthy	1998–2002	39	16	8	100	23	12.50	1702	29	1235	44	3-17	28.06	9	-
49	Roger Telemachus	1998–2006	37	15	3	73	29	6.08	1918	23	1565	56	4-43	27.94	4	-
50	Nantie Hayward	1998–2002	21	5	1	12	4	3.00	993	5	858	21	4-31	40.85	4	-
51	Dale Benkenstein	1998–2002	23	20	3	305	69	17.94	65	1	44	4	3-5	11.00	3	-
52	Alan Dawson	1998–2004	19	7	4	69	23*	23.00	901	11	715	21	4-49	34.04	2	-
53	Henry Williams	1999–2000	7	2	1	8	7	8.00	329	2	228	9	3-38	25.33	2	-
54	Andrew Hall	1999–2007	88	56	13	905	81	21.04	3341	30	2515	95	5-18	26.47	29	-
55	Victor Mpitsang	1999	2	1	1	1	1*	-	60	1	63	2	2-49	31.50	-	-
56	Boeta Dippenaar^{2}	1999–2006	101	89	14	3330	125*	44.00	-	-	-	-	-	-	33	-
57	Pieter Strydom	2000	10	8	3	48	34	9.60	252	-	206	2	1-18	103.00	3	-
58	David Terbrugge	2000	4	2	1	5	5	5.00	126	2	105	4	4-20	26.25	-	-
59	Neil McKenzie	2000–2003	64	55	10	1688	131*	37.51	46	-	27	-	-	-	21	-
60	Charl Willoughby	2000–2003	3	2	-	-	-	-	168	2	148	2	2-39	74.00	-	-
61	Nic Pothas	2000	3	1	-	24	24	24.00	-	-	-	-	-	-	4	1
62	Shafiek Abrahams	2000	1	1	1	16	16*	-	60	-	40	-	-	-	1	-
63	Justin Kemp^{2}	2001–2007	79	60	18	1371	100*	32.64	1171	10	915	29	3-20	31.55	31	-
64	Justin Ontong^{2}	2001–2008	27	15	2	184	32	14.15	538	3	396	9	3-30	44.00	14	-
65	André Nel	2001–2008	79	22	12	127	30*	12.70	3801	58	2935	106	5-45	27.68	21	-
66	Claude Henderson	2001	4	-	-	-	-	-	217	2	132	7	4-17	18.85	-	-
67	Charl Langeveldt	2001–2010	72	21	73	10	12	6.63	3489	29	2962	100	5-39	29.62	11	-
68	Graeme Smith^{2}	2002–2013	196	193	10	6989	141	38.19	1026	-	951	18	3-30	52.83	105	-
69	Jon Kent	2002	2	-	-	-	-	-	48	-	57	-	-	-	1	-
70	Robin Peterson	2002–2013	79	41	14	556	68	20.59	3278	15	2680	75	4-12	35.73	28	-
71	Martin van Jaarsveld	2002–2004	11	7	1	124	45	20.66	31	1	18	2	1-0	9.00	4	-
72	Ashwell Prince^{2}	2002–2007	49	38	11	940	89*	34.81	12	-	3	-	-	-	26	-
73	Monde Zondeki^{2}	2002–2008	11	2	2	4	3*	-	504	7	440	11	2-40	40.00	3	-
74	Jacques Rudolph^{2}	2003–2006	43	37	6	1157	81	37.32	24	-	26	-	-	-	11	-
75	Morné van Wyk	2003–2011	17	17	1	425	82	26.56	-	-	-	-	-	-	10	1
76	Albie Morkel^{2}	2004–2012	56	41	10	760	97	24.51	1977	13	1786	47	4-29	38.00	15	-
77	JP Duminy	2004–2019	199	179	40	5117	150*	36.81	3513	9	3143	69	4-16	45.55	82	-
78	AB de Villiers^{2}	2005–2018	228	218	39	9577	176	53.50	192	-	202	7	2-15	28.85	176	5
79	Andrew Puttick	2005	1	1	-	0	0	0.00	-	-	-	-	-	-	1	-
80	Johan Botha^{2}	2005–2012	11	6	3	98	46	32.66	438	1	361	7	2-49	51.57	6	-
81	Garnett Kruger	2006	3	2	1	-	-	-	138	1	139	2	1-43	69.50	1	-
82	Dale Steyn^{2}	2006-2019;	123	49	12	361	60	9.75	6195	69	5045	194	6-39	26.00	28	-
83	Johan van der Wath	2006–2007	8	7	2	85	37*	17.00	424	2	442	10	2-21	44.20	2	-
84	Loots Bosman^{2}	2006–2010	13	11	0	299	88	27.18	-	-	-	-	-	-	3	-
85	Alviro Petersen	2006–2013	21	19	1	504	80	28.00	6	0	7	0	0-7	-	6	-
86	Vernon Philander	2007–2015	30	19	7	151	30*	12.58	1279	20	986	41	4-12	24.04	6	-
87	Thandi Tshabalala	2007	4	1	1	2	2*	-	150	2	151	3	1-30	50.33	0	-
88	Gulam Bodi	2007	2	2	0	83	51	41.50	6	0	8	0	0-8	-	1	-
89	Morné Morkel^{2}	2007–2018	114	45	17	239	32*	8.53	5580	45	4595	180	5-21	25.52	29	-
90	Hashim Amla	2008–2019	181	178	14	8113	159	49.46	-	-	-	-	-	-	87	-
91	Paul Harris	2008	3	0	-	-	-	-	180	4	83	3	2-30	27.66	2	-
92	Johann Louw	2008	3	1	0	23	23	23.00	156	1	148	2	1-45	74.00	0	-
93	Vaughn van Jaarsveld	2008–2009	2	2	0	9	5	4.50	-	-	-	-	-	-	-	-
94	Wayne Parnell	2009–2023	73	43	15	574	56	20.50	3224	23	3010	99	5-48	30.40	13	-
95	Lonwabo Tsotsobe	2009–2013	61	21	12	56	16*	6.87	2964	44	2347	94	4-22	24.96	9	-
96	Roelof van der Merwe^{5}	2009–2010	13	7	3	39	12	9.75	705	2	561	17	3-27	33.00	3	-
97	Ryan McLaren	2009–2014	54	41	15	485	71*	18.65	2403	13	2102	77	4-19	27.29	13	-
98	David Miller	2010–	178	154	45	4611	139	42.30	-	-	-	-	-	-	87	-
99	Colin Ingram	2010–2013	31	29	3	843	124	32.42	6	-	17	0	-	-	12	-
100	Rusty Theron	2010–2013	4	1	0	5	5	5.00	194	0	173	12	5-44	14.41	4	-
101	Faf du Plessis	2011–2021	143	136	20	5507	185	47.47	192	0	189	2	1-8	94.50	81	-
102	Imran Tahir	2011–2019	107	36	16	157	29	7.85	5541	38	4297	173	7-45	24.83	25	-
103	Marchant de Lange	2012–2016	3	0	-	-	-	-	149	1	111	8	4-46	13.87	0	-
104	Dean Elgar	2012– 2018	8	7	1	104	42	17.33	96	1	67	2	1-11	33.50	4	-
105	Quinton de Kock	2013–	161	161	8	7123	178	46.55	-	-	-	-	-	-	13	18
106	Rory Kleinveldt	2013	10	7	0	105	43	15.00	513	6	448	12	4-22	37.33	4	-
107	Farhaan Behardien	2013–2018	59	49	14	1074	70	30.68	748	2	719	14	3-19	51.35	27	-
108	Aaron Phangiso	2013–2016	21	13	2	81	20	7.36	1085	6	829	26	3-40	31.88	4	-
109	Kyle Abbott	2013–2016	28	13	4	76	23	8.44	1303	13	1051	34	4-21	30.91	7	-
110	Chris Morris	2013–2019	42	27	4	467	62	20.30	1894	10	1756	48	4-31	36.58	9	-
111	Henry Davids	2013	2	2	0	8	7	4.00	-	-	-	-	-	-	0	-
112	Rilee Rossouw	2014–2016	36	35	3	1239	132	38.71	45	0	44	1	1-17	44.00	22	-
113	Mthokozisi Shezi	2014	1	0	-	-	-	-	36	2	8	1	1-8	8.00	0	-
114	Kagiso Rabada	2015–	106	45	18	401	31*	14.85	5444	63	4613	168	6-16	27.45	41	-
115	David Wiese^{6}	2015–2016	6	6	1	102	41*	20.40	294	0	316	9	3-50	35.11	0	-
116	Tabraiz Shamsi	2016–	55	15	11	39	11*	9.75	2697	8	2510	73	5-49	34.38	9	-
117	Temba Bavuma	2016–	55	53	5	2035	144	42.39	37	0	22	0	-	-	31	-
118	Andile Phehlukwayo	2016–	85	57	19	883	69*	23.23	3175	17	30411	97	4-22	31.35	17	-
119	Dwaine Pretorius	2016–2022	27	13	1	192	50	16.00	1144	9	947	35	4-36	27.05	11	-
120	Keshav Maharaj	2017–	56	31	8	324	40	14.08	2885	15	2772	73	5-33	31.12	13	-
121	Dane Paterson	2017–2019	4	0	-	-	-	-	209	1	217	4	3-44	54.25	2	-
122	Aiden Markram	2017–	86	82	9	2708	175	37.09	1252	2	1227	20	2-18	61.35	42	-
123	Wiaan Mulder	2017–	30	24	6	338	64	18.77	944	2	994	26	3-25	38.23	9	-
124	Khaya Zondo	2018–2021	6	6	1	146	54	29.20	-	-	-	-	-	-	1	-
125	Heinrich Klaasen	2018–2025	60	56	7	2141	174	43.69	30	0	33	0	-	-	51	7
126	Lungi Ngidi	2018–	75	31	17	126	20*	9.00	3461	32	3350	115	6-58	29.13	18	-
127	Reeza Hendricks	2018–	38	38	2	974	102	27.05	42	0	47	1	1-13	47.00	22	-
128	Junior Dala	2018–	3	2	1	8	5	8.00	150	0	168	2	1-57	84.00	1	-
129	Christiaan Jonker	2018	2	2	0	31	25	15.50	-	-	-	-	-	-	0	-
130	Duanne Olivier	2019	2	-	-	-	-	-	114	0	124	3	2-73	41.33	0	-
131	Rassie van der Dussen	2019–2025	71	65	12	2657	134	50.13	6	0	3	1	1–3	3.00	30	-
132	Beuran Hendricks	2019–	10	4	1	24	18	8.00	386	2	346	10	3-59	34.60	4	-
133	Anrich Nortje	2019–	21	6	1	30	10	6.00	976	4	924	36	4-51	25.66	3	-
134	Lutho Sipamla	2020–	5	2	2	14	10*	-	182	1	172	2	1-40	86.00	1	-
135	JJ Smuts	2020–2021	6	5	1	180	84	45.00	180	1	164	4	2-42	41.00	3	-
136	Bjorn Fortuin	2020–	16	11	1	77	28	7.70	759	5	611	18	2-22	33.94	2	-
137	Janneman Malan	2020–2022	23	22	2	958	177*	47.90	-	-	-	-	-	-	11	-
138	Kyle Verreynne	2020–	19	16	2	533	95	38.07	-	-	-	-	-	-	11	1
139	Daryn Dupavillon	2020–2021	2	1	0	17	17	17.00	66	0	51	1	1-21	51.00	0	-
140	Lizaad Williams	2021–	8	4	0	18	13	4.50	406	5	398	16	4-32	24.87	0	-
141	George Linde	2021–	4	3	1	29	18	14.50	150	1	140	4	2-32	35.00	4	-
142	Sisanda Magala	2021–	8	5	2	18	6*	6.00	342	4	381	15	5-43	25.40	2	-
143	Zubayr Hamza	2021–	1	1	0	56	56	56.00	-	-	-	-	-	-	0	-
144	Marco Jansen	2022–	32	27	5	553	75*	25.13	1565	11	1640	49	5-39	33.46	11	-
145	Gerald Coetzee	2023–	14	7	0	57	22	8.14	666	1	720	31	4-44	23.22	4	-
146	Tony de Zorzi	2023–	22	21	2	705	119*	37.10	-	-	-	-	-	-	1	-
147	Ryan Rickelton	2023–	17	17	1	454	103	28.37	-	-	-	-	-	-	18	6
148	Tristan Stubbs	2023–	15	15	2	392	112*	30.15	12	0	15	0	-	-	2	-
149	Nandre Burger	2023–	14	9	6	41	17	13.66	659	3	671	22	4-46	30.50	0	-
150	Jason Smith	2024–	3	3	0	132	91	44.00	30	0	29	0	-	-	1	-
151	Nqaba Peter	2024–	4	2	0	21	16	10.50	162	0	163	6	3-55	27.16	3	-
152	Ottneil Baartman	2024–	6	5	4	16	10*	16.00	252	2	221	8	2-32	27.62	2	-
153	Kwena Maphaka	2025–	3	3	0	1	1	0.33	131	2	195	5	4-72	39.00	1	-
154	Corbin Bosch	2024–	12	10	4	270	67	45.00	562	2	656	11	2-32	59.63	5	-
155	Eathan Bosch	2024–	1	1	1	7	7*	-	42	0	33	1	1-33	33.00	0	-
156	Matthew Breetzke	2025–	12	12	1	706	150	64.18	-	-	-	-	-	-	1	-
157	Mihlali Mpongwana	2025	1	1	1	1	1*	-	18	0	25	0	-	-	1	-
158	Senuran Muthusamy	2025–	5	4	1	22	9*	7.33	220	1	233	6	2-30	38.83	2	-
159	Dewald Brevis	2025–	9	9	1	230	54	28.75	24	0	28	0	-	-	5	-
160	Prenelan Subrayen	2025–	2	2	0	18	17	9.00	120	0	146	1	1-46	119.00	0	-
161	Codi Yusuf	2025–	1	1	0	25	5	5.00	60	0	80	0	-	-	0	-
162	Donovan Ferreira	2025–	3	2	0	10	7	5.00	138	0	115	2	2-53	57.50	3	-
163	Lhuan-dre Pretorius	2025–	3	3	0	142	57	47.33	-	-	-	-	-	-	2	-
164	Sinethemba Qeshile	2025–	2	1	0	22	22	22.00	-	-	-	-	-	-	0	-
165	Rubin Hermann	2025–	1	1	0	1	1	1.00	-	-	-	-	-	-	0	-

== Notes ==
- ^{1} Kepler Wessels also played ODI cricket for Australia. Only his records for South Africa are given above.
- ^{2} Nicky Boje, Mark Boucher, AB de Villiers, Boeta Dippenaar, Justin Kemp, Justin Ontong, Ashwell Prince, Dale Steyn, Jacques Rudolph, Monde Zondeki, Graeme Smith, Loots Bosman, Albie Morkel, Morne Morkel and Johan Botha also played ODI cricket for the African XI. Only their records for South Africa are given above.
- ^{3} Makhaya Ntini also played ODI cricket for the World XI. Only his records for South Africa are given above.
- ^{4} Jacques Kallis and Shaun Pollock also played ODI cricket for the African XI and the World XI. Only their records for South Africa are given above.
- ^{5} Roelof van der Merwe also played ODI cricket for Netherlands. Only his records for South Africa are given above.
- ^{6} David Wiese also played ODI cricket for Namibia. Only his records for South Africa are given above.

== See also ==
- One Day International
- South Africa national cricket team
- List of South Africa national cricket captains
- List of South Africa Test cricketers
- List of South Africa Twenty20 International cricketers
