= Princess of Wales Memorial Match 1998 =

Cricket match

Princess of Wales Memorial Match
| Marylebone Cricket Club | Rest of the World XI |
| 261/4 | 262/4 |
| 50 overs | 43.3 overs |
- Date: 18 July 1998
- Venue: Lord's, London
- Player of the match: Sachin Tendulkar (ROW XI)
- Umpires: David Shepherd; S.Venkataraghavan

The Princess of Wales Memorial Match was a 50-over exhibition cricket match played at Lord's, London, on 18 July 1998, and contested by the Marylebone Cricket Club (MCC), whose home ground is Lord's, and a Rest of the World XI. The Rest of the World team won the match by six wickets after chasing down the MCC's total of 261 runs with 6.3 overs to spare. The match raised more than £1 million for the Princess of Wales Memorial Fund, which was set up in memory of Diana, Princess of Wales, who died in a car accident in Paris the previous August.

== Squads ==
| MCC | ROW XI |
|---|---|
| (England) Michael Atherton (c); (Pakistan) Aamer Sohail; (Cricket West Indies) Shivnarine Chanderpaul; (India) Mohammad Azharuddin; (India) Sourav Ganguly; (South Africa) Brian McMillan; (Australia) Ian Healy; (India) Javagal Srinath; (India) Anil Kumble; (South Africa) Allan Donald; (Australia) Glenn McGrath | (India) Sachin Tendulkar (c); (Pakistan) Saeed Anwar; (Sri Lanka) Sanath Jayasuriya; (Sri Lanka) Aravinda de Silva; (England) Graeme Hick; (Australia) Tom Moody; (Zimbabwe) Andy Flower; (Pakistan) Wasim Akram; (Pakistan) Mushtaq Ahmed; (New Zealand) Chris Cairns; (Cricket West Indies) Ian Bishop |

== Match details ==
18 July 1998
Scorecard

| Marylebone Cricket Club; 261/4 (50 overs) | v | Rest of the World XI; 262/4 (43.3 overs) |
| Shivnarine Chanderpaul 127 (144); Chris Cairns 1/34 (10 overs) | | Sachin Tendulkar 125 (114); Allan Donald 1/29 (7 overs) |

Rest of the World XI won by 7 wickets
Lord's, London
Umpires: David Shepherd (Eng) and Srinivasaraghavan Venkataraghavan (Ind)
Player of the match: Sachin Tendulkar (Rest of the World XI)

- MCC won the toss and elected to bat.
