= David Johnson (cricketer, born 1971) =

Indian cricketer (1971–2024)

Personal information
- Full name: David Jude Johnson
- Born: 16 October 1971; Arsikere, Mysore State, India
- Died: 20 June 2024 (aged 52); Bengaluru, Karnataka, India
- Height: 178 cm (5 ft 10 in)
- Batting: Right-handed
- Bowling: Right-arm fast-medium
- Role: Bowler

International information
- National side: India
- Test debut (cap 208): 10 October 1996 v Australia
- Last Test: 26 December 1996 v South Africa

Domestic team information
- Years: Team
- 1992/93–2001/02: Karnataka

Career statistics
| Competition | Test | First-class | LA |
|---|---|---|---|
| Matches | 2 | 39 | 33 |
| Runs scored | 8 | 437 | 118 |
| Batting average | 4.00 | 11.20 | 9.07 |
| 100s/50s | 0/0 | 1/0 | 0/0 |
| Top score | 5 | 101* | 17 |
| Balls bowled | 240 | 5,936 | 1659 |
| Wickets | 3 | 125 | 0 |
| Bowling average | 47.66 | 28.63 | 31.46 |
| 5 wickets in innings | 0 | 8 | – |
| 10 wickets in match | 0 | 1 | – |
| Best bowling | 2/52 | 8/55 | 4/26 |
| Catches/stumpings | 0/– | 20/– | 4/– |
- Source: ESPNcricinfo, 20 June 2024

David Jude Johnson (16 October 1971 – 20 June 2024) was an Indian cricketer who bowled right arm medium-fast bowler and a right hand batsman. He played Test matches for India in 1996 making his debut against Australia. He represented Karnataka in the Indian domestic cricket setup playing 39 first class matches in a career spanning ten years between 1992 and 2001. After his retirement, Johnson remained involved with the sport as a coach and mentor.

== Biography ==
Johnson was born on 16 October 1971 in Arsikere, Hassan district in the southern Indian state of Karnataka.

On the back of a strong domestic performance for Karnataka, Johnson made his Test debut in the inaugural Border-Gavaskar Trophy at the Feroz Shah Kotla in 1996. He then accompanied the team to a tour of South Africa and played the first Test at Durban. That happened to be his last international outing.

Johnson, though, continued to play for Karnataka until the 2001/02 season. During the late 1990s, when Karnataka dominated the domestic circuit, Johnson was part of the pace battery which included Javagal Srinath, Venkatesh Prasad and Dodda Ganesh.

== Death ==
On 20 June 2024, Johnson died in an incident after a fall from his balcony on the fourth floor of an apartment in Bengaluru. He was 52.

According to Kothanur police officials, Johnson is believed to have died by suicide after jumping from the third floor of his house in Kothnur. A UDR (unnatural death report) was filed at the Kothanur police station. The body was taken for postmortem to Ambedkar Medical College Hospital at Shampura main road.
