= Lashings World XI =

Cricket team

The Lashings World XI is a cricket team captained by the former England, Lancashire and Surrey spin bowler Chris Schofield.

It was formed in 1984 as a pub team but evolved into an international XI after signing Richie Richardson in 1996. Now a corporate entertainment business, Lashings play between 20 and 30 matches during the English cricket season and toured Jamaica in late 2019.

The team has attracted a number of international cricketers and other celebrities to its ranks, starting with Richie Richardson, and including Brian Lara, Muttiah Muralitharan, Aravinda De Silva, Tatenda Taibu, Chris Cairns, Gordon Greenidge, Jimmy Adams, Henry Olonga, Javagal Srinath, Courtney Walsh, Allan Donald, Shoaib Akhtar and Sir Viv Richards. One "capture" was former English women's cricket team captain, Clare Connor. Sachin Tendulkar, Brendan Taylor, Inzamam Ul Haq, Wasim Akram, Rashid Latif and Ajit Agarkar are its more recent high-profile players. They travel across the United Kingdom, playing in a variety of venues against school and club teams.

The owners are Scott Charlton, David Fitzgerald and Peter Lampkin, who bought the club from its founder, David Folb, in 2018. Folb still owns the Lashings Sports Bar in Maidstone, Kent, but the businesses are now completely separate.
