= Daryll Cullinan =

South African cricketer (born 1967)

Personal information
- Full name: Daryll John Cullinan
- Born: 4 March 1967 (age 59); Kimberley, Cape Province, South Africa
- Batting: Right-handed
- Bowling: Right arm off break

International information
- National side: South Africa (1993–2001)
- Test debut (cap 253): 2 January 1993 v India
- Last Test: 23 April 2001 v West Indies
- ODI debut (cap 25): 9 February 1993 v Pakistan
- Last ODI: 4 November 2000 v New Zealand

Domestic team information
- Years: Team
- 1983/84–1995/96: Border
- 1984/85: Impalas
- 1984/85–1990/91: Western Province
- 1991/92–1996/97: Transvaal
- 1995: Derbyshire
- 1997/98–2002/03: Gauteng
- 2001: Kent
- 2003/04: Easterns
- 2003/04–2004/05: Titans

Career statistics
Competition	Tests	ODI	FC	LA
Matches	70	138	246	330
Runs scored	4,554	3,860	16,261	8,824
Batting average	44.21	32.99	44.79	32.32
100s/50s	14/20	3/23	44/79	9/49
Top score	275*	124	337*	127*
Balls bowled	120	174	992	378
Wickets	2	5	10	8
Bowling average	35.50	24.80	48.60	38.62
5 wickets in innings	0	0	0	0
10 wickets in match	0	0	0	0
Best bowling	1/10	2/30	2/27	2/30
Catches/stumpings	67/–	62/–	245/–	155/–
- Source: CricInfo, 2 June 2008

Daryll John Cullinan (born 4 March 1967) is a former South African first-class cricketer who played Test cricket and One Day Internationals for South Africa as a specialist batsman. He was regarded as a gifted batsman, as he was equally adept against pace or spin. Cullinan has said that his most important batting fundamentals were his balance, knowing where his off-stump was and getting his defence in order. He ended up playing 70 tests and 138 ODIs for South Africa. Cullinan's career Test average of 44.21 is only surpassed by ten South Africans with more than ten Tests. At the time of his retirement, he held the record for scoring the most test centuries for South Africa, with 14. Cullinan was a member of the South Africa team that won the 1998 ICC KnockOut Trophy.

He also occasionally gives his insight about the sport through various platforms and calls himself a huge supporter of T20 cricket. He was also a vocal advocate for the inclusion of more associate nations in ICC tournaments especially in T20 format when he specifically made the point during the 2012 ICC World Twenty20. He was embroiled in numerous controversies during the latter part of his career including the fallout with the team-mates, fallout with the cricket board for his involvement in the Indian Cricket League.

== Biography ==
He grew up in Queenstown and pursued his primary education at the Queen's College Boys' High School. He started watching the sport of squash from a young age, but his father discouraged it by saying he would not make a living out of playing squash, recommending instead that he stick to cricket. He grew up in apartheid-era South Africa, especially when South Africa faced a shortage of cricket matches due to political constraints. He idolised Graeme Pollock while growing up, calling him a true star.

== Domestic career ==
Cullinan made his first-class debut in 1983. At the age of 15, critics also drew comparisons of his batting intensity to that of Barry Richards. He became the youngest South African to score a first-class century, at the age of 16 years and 304 days in 1985. Soon after he eclipsed the record of Graeme Pollock to become the youngest ever South African first-class centurion, he was tagged as the “new Graeme Pollock” when he was still a schoolboy. He emerged as a child prodigy and was dubbed by many in cricketing fraternity as the next best thing for South African cricket. Despite all the hype around him, he was also subjected to abuse and bullying at the age of 16 during a domestic match against Transvaal and Cullinan himself admitted that he was an introvert and had to cope up with the bullying. Despite excelling at first-class level from a young age, he had to wait for a long time for his turn to play test cricket due to the fact that South Africa was still banned from international cricket until 1992 due to apartheid. He revealed that his initial ambition is to play country cricket because of the ban on South African cricket which led to lack of exposure.

He also achieved the highest first-class score in domestic South African cricket at the time, scoring 337 not out.

Cullinan was also involved in an unusual stoppage when 'calamari stopped play'. During a regional match in South Africa, Cullinan hit fellow international Roger Telemachus for six, whereupon it ended up in the kitchen and straight into a pan of fried calamari. According to Wisden, "Daryll Cullinan hit a six into a frying pan. It was about ten minutes before the ball was cool enough for the umpires to remove the grease. Even then, [the bowler] was unable to grip the ball and it had to be replaced".

His first-class career spanned almost 20 years and he went onto play first-class cricket for six different teams in South African domestic competition including Transvaal, Western Province, Easterns, Titans, Border and Gauteng. He also pursued county cricket featuring for Derbyshire in 1995 and then for Kent in 2001. He signed off from domestic first-class cricket with a first innings century in March 2005 and it also turned out to be his final first-class match.

== International career ==
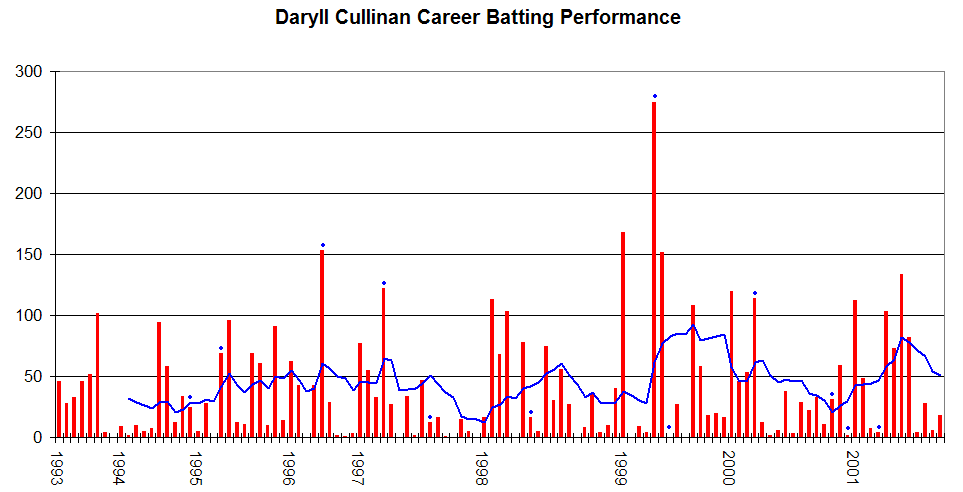
Daryll Cullinan's career performance graph

He made his test debut against India on 2 January 1993 at Cape Town and made 46 in the first innings following it up with a score of 28 in the second innings and ultimately the test ended in a draw. He made his ODI debut on 9 February 1993 against Pakistan at Durban during the 1992–93 Total International Series but he was dismissed for a silver duck by Waqar Younis as Pakistan registered a stunning 10 run victory defending a modest total of just 208 despite the heroics of Andrew Hudson for South Africa in the run chase.

He was in the center stage of South Africa's batting lineup ever since South Africa was readmitted to international cricket in the 1990s. Cullinan was known for his ability to produce fine test innings under pressure situations at any conditions and he delivered in most of the occasions except for in Australian conditions. In 1994, in the third test of the series against England at The Oval, he stood firm and scored crucial 94 runs which accounted for 54% of the team total whereas other batsmen around him fell prey to Devon Malcolm as Malcolm decimated the Proteas with 9/57 and South Africa crumbled to 175 all out. He was an integral member of the South African which won the four nation Sameer Cup 1996–97 where South Africa emerged victorious in the final after defeating Pakistan by 7 wickets.

He was part of the South African squad which reached quarter-finals of the 1996 Cricket World Cup. During the quarter-final he top-scored for Proteas with 69 runs but it was in vain as West Indies won the match by a narrow margin of 19 runs. He played a key role in South Africa's triumph over India in the final of the 1996–97 Standard Bank International One-Day Series where he top-scored in the final with 60 runs. He was also the leading run-scorer of the tournament with 300 runs. He was a member of the team which claimed the 1996 Pepsi Sharjah Cup which was played between South Africa, Pakistan and India. He was a crucial key element to South Africa's triumph in the inaugural edition of the ICC KnockOut Trophy in 1998 where South Africa recorded their first ever ICC title win by defeating fancied West Indies in the final by chasing 246. He opened the batting throughout the tournament despite having played primarily in the position of number 4 or lower in previous occasions.

On 27 January 1999, in an ODI against the West Indies he was given out for handling the ball to become the first South African in 42 years to be dismissed in that fashion after Russell Endean. Facing the West Indian spinner Keith Arthurton, Cullinan fended the ball off into the ground. It bounced high in the air, and Cullinan removed his right hand from his bat to catch it as it fell again. Despite the fact that it was unlikely that the ball would land near the stumps, the West Indies captain, Brian Lara, appealed, and Cullinan was dismissed. By the time, he was batting on 46 and was ruled out by the umpires to become only the second batsman after Mohinder Amarnath to be given out for handling the ball in ODI history.

In the first test of the New Zealand tour at Auckland in March 1999, he registered his career best highest test score of 275* which propelled South Africa to pile up a huge first innings total of 621/5 before the declaration call came from South African skipper Hansie Cronje, effectively dented the opportunity for Cullinan to convert his maiden double century to a triple century.

He spent 658 or 659 minutes (10 hours 59 minutes) nearly 11 hours in the crease during his marathon knock and also surpassed the record of Graeme Pollock for the then highest ever individual score by a batsman for South Africa in test cricket. His record stood for a long time but was later shattered by Hashim Amla who scored 311* against England in 2013. As of 2022, it stands as the 4th highest score by a South African in tests.

He was part of the infamous 1999 Cricket World Cup campaign where South Africa choked in the crucial moment of their World Cup semi-final against Australia as South Africa were bowled out for 213 resulting in a tie and as a result narrowly losing their way to reach the final on the back of an inferior net run rate. The epic choke by South Africa which was caused due to a terrible mix-up between player of the tournament Lance Klusener and tail-ender Allan Donald was proven costly and later the iconic moment was dubbed as the “birth of the chokers tag”. Cullinan himself played a part in South Africa's humiliating tie as he wasted as many deliveries in his sluggish innings scoring only 6 runs off 30 balls at a mediocre strike rate of 20.

In November 1999, he drew level with Gary Kirsten and Dudley Nourse with most test centuries by a South African batter in test cricket when he scored his ninth test hundred in the first test of the five match home test series against England at the Wanderers. He was adjudged the player of the series for his contributions with the bat throughout the series scoring 386 runs but the series was overshadowed and marred by Hansie Cronje's decision to forfeit a test innings in the fifth and final test to ensure a result rather than a draw. He further demonstrated his batting prowess in the first test of the Sri Lankan tour at spin friendly turning tracks in Galle International Stadium in 2000 where he went onto score a career defining century and managed to counter the threat of spin wizard Muttiah Muralitharan during the knock. He was part of the South African team which clinched the 2000 Singapore Challenge which was played as a tri-nation tournament among South Africa, New Zealand and Pakistan.

In January 2001, when he scored his 12th test century during the second test match at Cape Town against Sri Lanka, he broke the then South African record of most test centuries which was held by Gary Kirsten at that time. He attempted to opt out of ODI cricket at the end of the 2001 season but he was thrown under the bus by Cricket South Africa as undue pressure was inserted on him to sign a new two-year contract.

However, things turned swiftly as he announced his international retirement in 2002 under chaotic circumstances mainly due to a dispute with the cricket board. However, after the announcement of his retirement he was soon recalled back to the team for the home test series against Australia in the same season. He recovered from a knee injury which he sustained prior to the series but he was not included in the playing XI for the first test. He was however drafted into the team for the second test replacing Boeta Dippenaar. He dropped a bombshell by suddenly pulling out from the squad withdrawing himself just hours before the eve of the second test match at Cape Town in an unceremonious way and flew to Johannesburg immediately. There were rumors circulated that he may have even captained the team had he made himself available on the absence of Shaun Pollock for the second test due to Pollock being a doubtful starter for the test if the latter had failed the late fitness test. The board clarified that it couldn't meet the set expectations and certain demands made by Cullinan which led to contractual dispute. He later issued a public apology regarding the last minute withdrawal from the Australia series.

=== Shane Warne's bunny ===
Cullinan scored only 153 runs averaging 12.75 in seven test matches against Australia, falling to Shane Warne on four occasions. Cullinan also fell to Warne eight times in One-Day Internationals. Sources such as the Herald Sun quote Cullinan as being Shane Warne's bunny.

He struggled against Warne's bowling and mental attacks. Warne acknowledged that he tried to sledge and intimidate Cullinan. Cullinan sought help from a sports psychologist, and after his retirement Cullinan mentioned “Warne was too good for me”. It is believed that Cullinan tried too hard against Australia in order to make up for the missed opportunities in his first two tours to Australia, when he underperformed despite his batting credentials.

During South Africa's Super Six match against Australia at the 1999 World Cup, he was again bowled by Shane Warne.

== Post-playing career ==
In June 1999, he started a temporary coaching stint by joining Bermuda national team.

After quitting cricket, he became a television commentator. Cullinan was appointed as the coach of the Kolkata Tigers in the Indian Cricket League. He also runs a coaching centre in Johannesburg.

He served as a consultant to Namibian team at the 2012 ICC World Twenty20 Qualifiers where Namibia registered three victories including a famous win over giant-killers Ireland in their opening fixture.

In December 2020, he launched the MS Dhoni - CSS High Performance Centre and was appointed as the director of coaching of the high performance centre.

In 2021, he signed a partnership with Singaporean-based SportsTech platform called Koach Hub.

He and Morné van Wyk were roped in as two foreign commentators for the first edition of the Kashmir Premier League in 2021.

== Honours ==
He was named as South Africa Cricket's Annual Cricketer of the Year three times in 1989, 1996 and 1999.

== Controversies ==
During the tail-end of his career, he had a dramatic fallout with the South African cricket authorities as he went on to question the selection of black players in the team and also criticized the quota system.

In an autobiography written by former South African batsman Herschelle Gibbs, Gibbs made claims and accusations that Cullinan had exposed the team-mates including Roger Telemachus, Andre Nel, Gibbs, Justin Kemp and Paul Adams for smoking marijuana during South Africa's tour of the West Indies in 2001 where players had apparently smoked as part of victory celebrations following their series over the West Indies. However, Cullinan himself clarified the issue and denied the allegations made by his former team-mate Gibbs.

In 2004, he was found guilty for questioning a number of umpire's decisions constantly during a SuperSport shield series match at the Supersport Park.

He involved in a heated confrontation with HD Ackerman during the eve of the domestic match between Titans and Lions in 2005 and as a result he was banned for one match.

In 2008, he was ousted from SuperSport's television commentary panel due to his engagement with the ICL League.

In November 2013, Cullinan was sequestrated for failing to pay back Azrapix Investments CC R19300.

In 2017, he was convicted for failing to provide maintenance for his two sons who were born to his first wife Virginia with whom he parted ways in 2008. The Randburg Magistrate Court also urged Cullinan to pay all his arrears within the next two years. He was also given options of one year imprisonment or to pay compensation of R3000.
