= Dodda Ganesh =

Indian cricketer

Personal information
- Full name: Dodda Narasiah Ganesh
- Born: 30 June 1973 (age 53); Bangalore, Mysore State, India
- Batting: Right-handed
- Bowling: Right-arm medium

International information
- National side: India (1997)
- Test debut (cap 210): 2 January 1997 v South Africa
- Last Test: 17 April 1997 v West Indies
- Only ODI (cap 102): 15 February 1997 v Zimbabwe

Domestic team information
- Years: Team
- 1994–2005: Karnataka

Career statistics
Competition	Tests	ODIs	FC	LA
Matches	4	1	104	89
Runs scored	25	4	2,023	525
Batting average	6.25	4.00	18.39	13.81
100s/50s	0/0	0/0	1/7	0/0
Top score	8	4	119	31
Balls bowled	461	30	20,355	4,346
Wickets	5	1	365	128
Bowling average	57.40	20.00	29.42	27.11
5 wickets in innings	0	0	20	1
10 wickets in match	0	0	6	0
Best bowling	2/28	1/20	7/36	5/27
Catches/stumpings	0/–	0/–	45/–	27/–
- Source: ESPNcricinfo, 29 March 2014

Dodda Narasiah Ganesh (Born 30 June 1973) is a former Indian cricketer who played in 4 Tests and one ODI in 1997. He was a right-arm seam bowler and lower-order batsman.

Ganesh failed to make an impression in his limited Test opportunities, picking up just five wickets at an average of 57.40. In first-class cricket, he took 365 wickets from 104 matches, including 299 at 27.09 for his domestic team Karnataka.

== Early career ==
Dodda Ganesh started as a wicket-keeper and an opening batsman. His idols while growing up were K. N. Ananthapadmanabhan, the Kerala spin bowler, and India's World Cup-winning wicket-keeper Syed Kirmani. Gundappa Viswanath spotted his bowling talent and enrolled him at the Chikna club. Early days he played in the streets of Balehonnur, where he played with the likes of Ismail. Frustrated with the lack of opportunities, he shifted to AV Jayaprakash's training camp, where he prospered as a bowler and forced his way into the Karnataka side.

== Domestic career ==
The 1990s was the golden era for Karnataka cricket. Despite making his debut in the 1994–95 season, Ganesh could not get a permanent slot in the Karnataka team due to the presence of Javagal Srinath, Venkatesh Prasad, Anil Kumble and Sunil Joshi.

In the 1996–97 Irani Cup, he picked up 11 wickets, including V. V. S. Laxman and Navjot Singh Sidhu, and he stormed into national reckoning for the tour of South Africa.

== International career ==
Ganesh made his international debut in the 2nd Test against South Africa at Cape Town. He bowled 24 overs in the first innings without success. He took his first Test wicket in the second innings when he trapped Gary Kirsten leg before wicket. India suffered a huge defeat in this game. He kept his place for the next Test at Johannesburg. He just bowled nine overs in the game, as South Africa hung on for a draw.

Despite not having a brilliant tour, he was selected for the 1997 tour of the West Indies. During the 3rd Test at Barbados, he picked up four wickets, including Carl Hooper, in both innings. Despite having only 120 runs to chase, India stumbled in the 2nd innings to be all out for 81. Ganesh played one more rain-affected Test at Guyana.

== Later career ==
Ganesh returned to the Karnataka side and became the team's bowling mainstay. Over a long career from 1994–95 to 2005–06, he took 365 wickets. His best bowling figures were 7 for 36 (12 for 89 in the match) against Haryana in 2002–03. His batting became more valuable over the years. In 2002-03 he scored 536 runs at an average of 41.23, including his only century, 119 against Vidarbha.

== After cricket ==
Dodda Ganesh has expressed an interest in politics and joined Janata Dal (Secular) led by former Prime Minister of India H. D. Deve Gowda.

He took up the position of coach of Goa in 2012–13.

In October 2016, he participated as a contestant on the Bigg Boss Kannada 4, and survived for two weeks.

In September 2024, he was removed as the head coach of the Kenya national cricket team a month after his appointment due to procedural irregularities. He was replaced by Lameck Onyango
