= Saba Karim =

Indian cricket player (b. 1967)

Syed Saba Karim
Personal information
- Born: 14 November 1967 (age 58); Patna, Bihar, India
- Batting: Right-handed
- Role: Wicket-keeper

International information
- National side: India
- Test debut (cap 230): 10 November 2000 v Bangladesh
- Last Test: 10 November 2000 v Bangladesh
- ODI debut (cap 101): 23 January 1997 v South Africa
- Last ODI: 30 May 2000 v Bangladesh

Career statistics
Competition	Tests	ODIs	FC
Matches	1	34	120
Runs scored	15	362	7,310
Batting average	15.00	15.73	56.66
100s/50s	0/0	0/1	22/33
Top score	15	55	234
Balls bowled	–	–	36
Wickets	–	–	0
Bowling average	–	–	–
5 wickets in innings	–	–	–
10 wickets in match	–	–	–
Best bowling	–	–	–
Catches/stumpings	1/0	27/3	243/55
Medal record
Men's Cricket
Representing India
ACC Asia Cup
Runner-up	1997 Sri Lanka
- Source: ESPNcricinfo, 16 January 2018

Syed Saba Karim (born 14 November 1967) is a former Indian cricketer. He was a right-handed batsman and a wicket-keeper. Karim has also served in the corporate sector. He has worked in the Corporate Communications Division of TISCO.

Saba has been very vocal in his views on various cricketing aspects like team performance, umpiring standards and day-night test matches etc.

Saba became captain of under-19 Patna team at the age of 13 and led his team to victory in Shmayal Sinha Trophy Bihar inter district competition in those days for school boys from there he was selected as Captain of Bihar Team in Vijay Merchant Trophy in 1981, from there he was selected in India Under 15 camp in Mumbai

== Career ==
He had to wait for very long to make his test debut mainly because he was playing for Bihar not so strong a team in those days, He kept on performing and was praised by the likes of Sunil Gavaskar for his keeping and batting. It took him almost 10 years to make his Indian team debut.

=== First class career ===
Karim started his first-class career for Bihar in 1982–83 at the age of 15, immediately after finishing his schooling at St. Xavier's High School, Patna. His career-best score was 234 against Orissa in the 1990-91 Ranji Trophy. He was first picked for India as a replacement for Nayan Mongia in the Standard Bank Series in South Africa in 1996-97 and he performed well with the bat when he scored 55 on debut and a 38 in the next match, however, his next eight innings saw him make 49 runs.

=== Eye injury ===
The effects of an eye injury suffered while keeping for India against Bangladesh in a limited-overs match in May 2000 ended his playing career. However, he played one Test, also against Bangladesh, in November 2000.

== Involvement in cricket associations ==
=== Appointment with BCCI ===
On 1 January 2018, Saba Karim was appointed by BCCI as General Manager, Cricket Operations. Primarily, his major responsibilities held as giving strategic direction to the cricket department, implementing the operational plans, budgeting, determining and monitoring the compliance of match playing regulations, standards of venues, administration of Domestic Program. Apart from Saba, former pacer Venkatesh Prasad's name was also highlighted for applying for the same position.

=== National selector ===
On 27 September 2012 Saba Karim was appointed as the national selector from the East Zone.

== Controversy ==
In September 2019, Karim was sent a notice by Bihar Cricket Association for interfering in the process of the age-verification test of the U-16 players by anti-doping manager Abhijit Salvi. As per the BCA chief, Karim stopped the checks once the players picked by the disqualified committee of the BCA were tested. The BCA chief in question remarked – "You should not forget that you are holding a public post in the BCCI as GM Cricket Operations and from the above actions, it is abundantly clear that you are bent upon allowing the disqualified committee to sell out the talent of Bihar. You should refrain from taking part in the politics of Bihar. Through this legal notice, I would like to request you to please refrain from doing all such acts. You should also not forget that none is above the law"

In October 2019, Saba Karim was criticized for not arranging enough pink balls for the various domestic matches despite Sourav Ganguly's insistence on the same. A functionary was quoted as saying – "Had Karim ensured that we had domestic matches under lights, say knockouts of the Ranji Trophy or for that matter the Irani Cup, we would have had enough balls ready. But the whole idea was almost put into the boot of the car. There was no effort made. So now, when we have to provide for close to 48 balls – to the two teams, the match officials, etc – where do we get them from? How about substitute balls if one ball is hit out of the park after 34 overs? You need a ball of the almost same condition. Where do we get them from?”

Since October 2019, Saba has been accused of the unconstitutional appointment of the support staff of the women's national team by CoA member Diana Edulji and BCCI's new apex council member Shantha Rangaswamy. Edulji wrote in an email to the BCCI CEO that candidates for the post of a video analyst for the national women's team were interviewed on Friday despite Pushkar Sawant, the current analyst, having been already nominated by Karim, without keeping the selectors in the loop.
