= Paul Adams (cricketer) =

South African cricketer

Personal information
- Full name: Paul Regan Adams
- Born: 20 January 1977 (age 49); Cape Town, Cape Province, South Africa
- Nickname: Gogga
- Height: 168 cm (5 ft 6 in)
- Batting: Right-handed
- Bowling: Left-arm wrist spin
- Role: Bowler

International information
- National side: South Africa (1995–2004)
- Test debut (cap 263): 26 December 1995 v England
- Last Test: 10 March 2004 v New Zealand
- ODI debut (cap 37): 9 January 1996 v England
- Last ODI: 10 July 2003 v Zimbabwe

Domestic team information
- Years: Team
- 1995/96–2007/08: Western Province
- 2004/05: Western Province Boland
- 2005/06–2007/08: Cape Cobras

Career statistics
Competition	Test	ODI	FC	LA
Matches	45	24	141	76
Runs scored	360	66	1,752	180
Batting average	9.00	16.50	17.17	11.25
100s/50s	0/0	0/0	0/2	0/0
Top score	35	48*	70	33*
Balls bowled	8,850	1,109	27,102	3,156
Wickets	134	29	412	84
Bowling average	32.87	28.10	32.66	26.92
5 wickets in innings	4	0	16	0
10 wickets in match	1	0	3	0
Best bowling	7/128	3/26	9/79	3/12
Catches/stumpings	29/–	7/–	73/–	22/–
Medal record
Representing South Africa
Men's Cricket
Commonwealth Games
Gold medal – first place	1998 Kuala Lumpur	Team
- Source: Cricinfo, 30 August 2009

Paul Regan Adams (born 20 January 1977) is a former South African cricketer. A left-arm unorthodox spin bowler with a unique bowling action, Adams played for the Test and ODI teams for national team sporadically since the 1990s. Meanwhile, his first class cricket career registered 412 wickets. He was also the coach of the Cape Cobras cricket team.

== Bowling action ==
Adams's bowling action was highly unorthodox and Mike Gatting likened it to a "frog in a blender". Though his action initially caught world batsmen by surprise, he was soon exposed for lack of variety by the Australians. As such, he became less effective.

== International career ==
In December 2006 he was recalled to the Test side for the series against India, only to be dropped from the squad before the first Test. He held the ball with two fingers of his left hand (thumb, and the index finger). He announced his retirement from professional cricket on 2 October 2008, more than four years after his last Test match and five years after his last ODI.

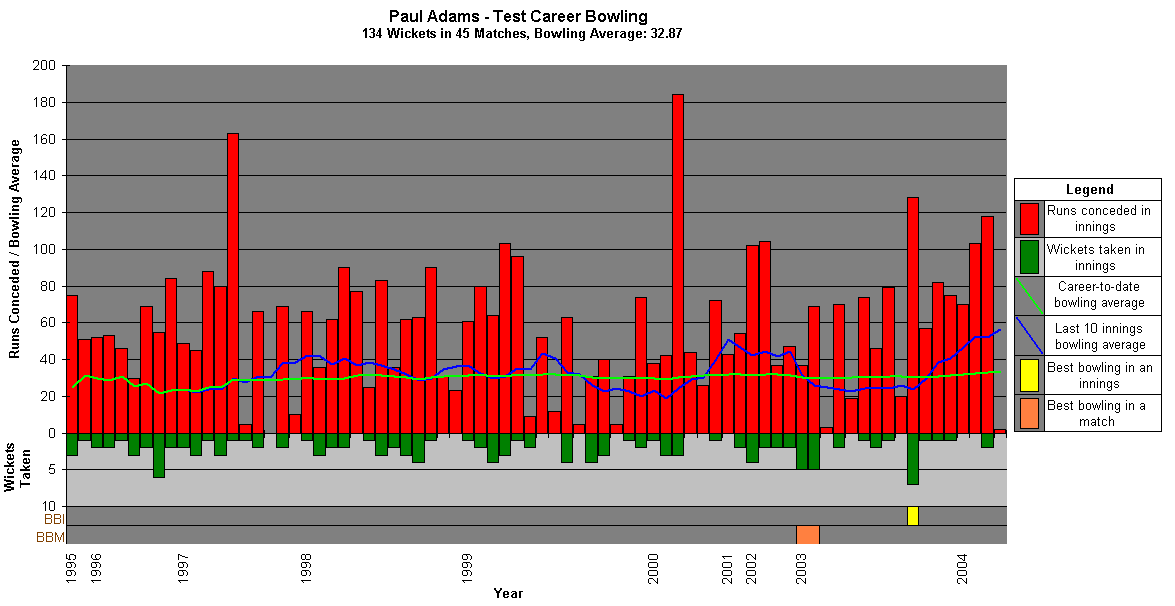
A graph showing Adams' test career bowling statistics and how they have varied over time.
