= Venkatesh Prasad =

Indian cricket player

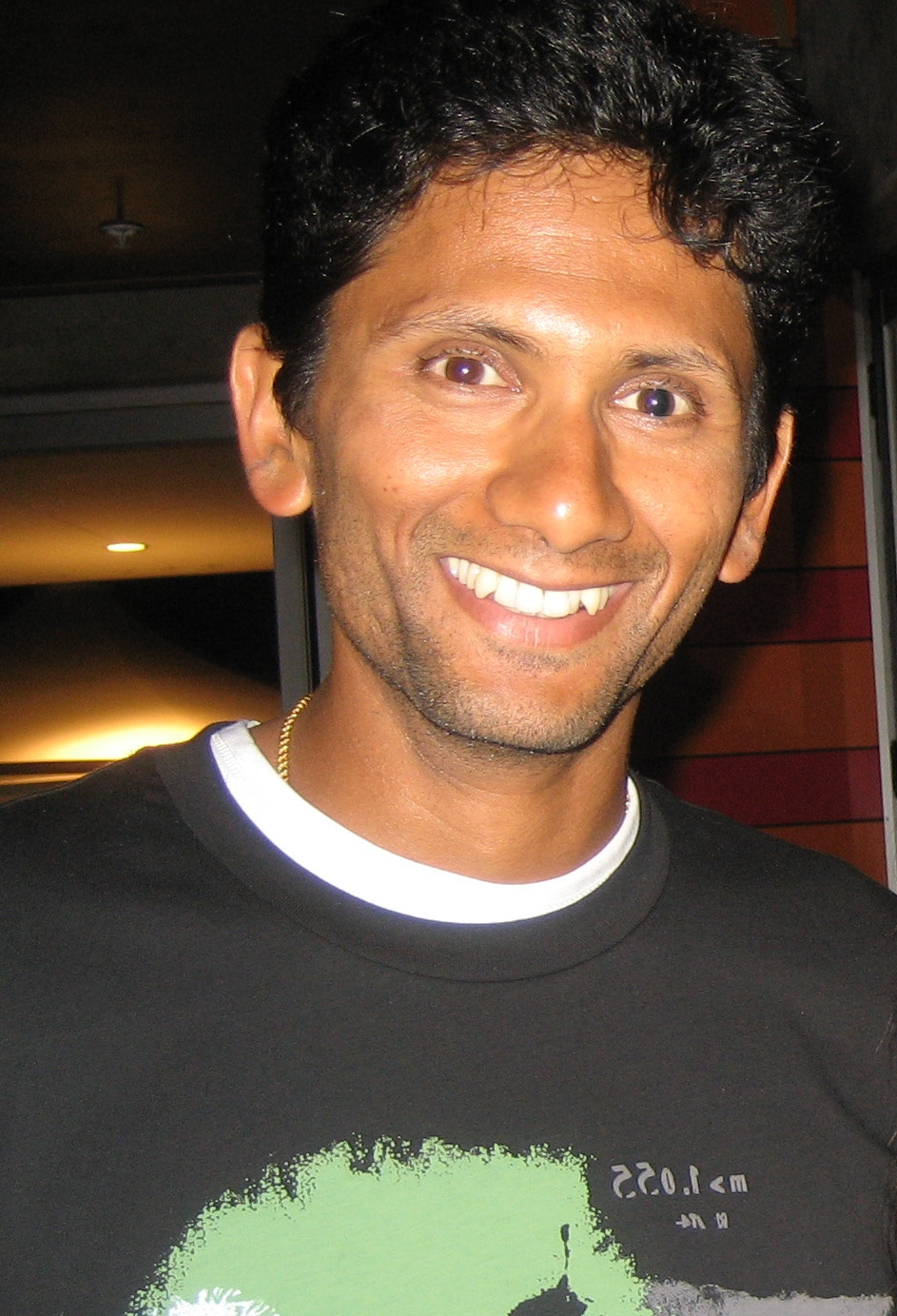
- Venkatesh Prasad in 2008

Personal information
- Full name: Venkatesh Prasad
- Born: 5 August 1969 (age 57); Bengaluru, Mysuru State (present–day Karnataka), India
- Batting: Right-handed
- Bowling: Right-arm medium-fast
- Role: Bowler

International information
- National side: India (1994–2001)
- Test debut (cap 204): 7 June 1996 v England
- Last Test: 29 August 2001 v Sri Lanka
- ODI debut (cap 89): 2 April 1994 v New Zealand
- Last ODI: 17 October 2001 v Kenya

Domestic team information
- Years: Team
- 1991–2005: Karnataka

Career statistics
Competition	Test	ODI	FC	LA
Matches	33	161	123	236
Runs scored	203	221	892	304
Batting average	7.51	6.90	10.02	6.46
100s/50s	0/0	0/0	0/0	0/0
Top score	30*	19	37	20
Balls bowled	7,041	8,129	22,222	11,951
Wickets	96	196	361	295
Bowling average	35.00	32.30	27.75	29.72
5 wickets in innings	7	1	18	2
10 wickets in match	1	0	3	0
Best bowling	6/33	5/27	7/37	6/18
Catches/stumpings	6/–	37/–	75/–	56/–
Medal record
Men's Cricket
Representing India
ICC Champions Trophy
Runner-up	2000 Kenya
ACC Asia Cup
Winner	1995 United Arab Emirates
Runner-up	1997 Sri Lanka
- Source: CricketArchive, 2 September 2017

Venkatesh Prasad (born 5 August 1969) is an Indian Cricket Kannada Commentator, coach and former professional cricketer who played Tests and One Day Internationals. He made his debut in 1994. Primarily a right-arm medium-fast bowler, Prasad was noted for his bowling combination with Javagal Srinath. He was a part of the squad which finished as runners-up at the 2000 ICC Champions Trophy.

He is the bowling coach for Kings XI Punjab in the Indian Premier League, having formerly performed the same role for the Indian cricket team from 2007 to 2009.

He currently serves as General Manager for Canara Bank. and, since December 2025, as President of the Karnataka State Cricket Association (KSCA).

== Early life and education ==
He has a post graduate certificate from University of London. Bachelor of Engineering from MSRIT.

== International career ==
Prasad took 96 wickets from 33 Tests at an average of 35, and 196 wickets from 161 ODIs at an average of 32.30. Prasad was more effective on wickets that helped seam bowling even though his best Test bowling figures of 6 for 33, achieved against Pakistan in the 1999 Test series in India, came on a docile pitch in Chennai; these figures included a spell of bowling in which he took 5 wickets for 0 runs. Notably, he once took 10 wickets in a Test match in Durban, South Africa, in December 1996. It remains his only ten-wicket haul in Test cricket. Prasad also took five-wicket hauls in England, in 1996, in Sri Lanka, in 2001, and in the West Indies, in 1997. In the 1996/97 season, he took 55 wickets in 15 Tests and 48 wickets in 30 ODIs. For the period, he was named the CEAT International Cricketer of the Year. He received the Arjuna Award in 2000.

Prasad played his final Test match in Sri Lanka in 2001. One of his finest moments came in 1996 Cricket World Cup when after being hit for a boundary and openly sledged by Pakistan batsman Aamir Sohail, Prasad, on the very next ball, clean bowled Sohail, which was a key turning point of the match, which helped India win the game. Prasad was known for his slow leg cutters and was one of its first proponents in world cricket.

== Injury and late career ==
Prasad struggled with injuries and dipping form towards the end of his career. He was dropped from the Indian team after the 2001 test series in Sri Lanka. Prasad tried unsuccessfully to make a comeback after that before retiring from all forms of cricket in May 2005, having secured two Ranji Trophy championships with Karnataka. He was made coach of the India Under-19 Cricket team in January. He was the coach of the U-19 team that finished runners-up in the 2006 U-19 Cricket World Cup.

== Coaching career ==
After the disappointing performance of the Indian Team in World Cup 2007, Prasad was appointed as the bowling coach of the team for the Bangladesh Tour in May. It was his return to the Indian team after a span of 3 years. On 15 October 2009, Venkatesh Prasad was sacked by the BCCI, which did not give any reasons for the unceremonious dumping.

Prasad was the coach of Royal Challengers Bangalore during their inaugural season in 2008. He worked as bowling coach for Kings XI Punjab in 2018.

== Personal life ==
His mother tongue is Kannada. Prasad is married to Jayanthi.
