= Adam Bacher =

South African cricketer (born 1973)

Personal information
- Full name: Adam Marc Bacher
- Born: 29 October 1973 (age 53); Johannesburg, South Africa
- Batting: Right-handed
- Bowling: Right-arm medium

Career statistics
Competition	Test	ODI
Matches	19	13
Runs scored	833	270
Batting average	26.03	20.76
100s/50s	0/5	0/1
Top score	96	56
Balls bowled	6	108
Wickets	0	3
Bowling average	–	21.33
5 wickets in innings	–	0
10 wickets in match	–	0
Best bowling	–	2/36
Catches/stumpings	11/–	4/–
- Source: ESPNcricinfo, 25 January 2006

Medal record

Cricket

Representing South Africa

Maccabiah Games
Gold medal – first place	2005 Maccabiah	Cricket
Gold medal – first place	2009 Maccabiah	Cricket

Adam Marc Bacher (born 29 October 1973) is a former South African cricketer. He was a right-handed batsman and a right-arm medium-pace bowler. He is the nephew of former South African captain and cricket chief Ali Bacher.

== Biography ==
Bacher entered South African cricket in 1995/96 in the Under-24 side which toured Sri Lanka and made his Test debut against India at the back end of the following year. Having had a mostly unsuccessful start to the season, his form picked up in Australia where he put in an innings of 96. He continued to impress for the next two years, but after poor form against England and the West Indies, he spent seven years out of one day cricket. He is best remembered for a spectacular catch he took while fielding deep to remove Sachin Tendulkar in the 1997 test series against India.

Bacher was picked once again in 2005 for an English One Day International, but he only played the first game of the one day series, and was dropped thereafter.

== See also ==
- List of select Jewish cricketers
