= Rudi Bryson =

South African cricketer (born 1968)

Personal information
- Full name: Rudi Edwin Bryson
- Born: 25 July 1968 (age 58); Springs, Transvaal
- Batting: Right-handed
- Bowling: Right-arm fast-medium
- Source: Cricinfo, 7 March 2006

Rudi Edwin Bryson (born 25 July 1968) is a former South African cricketer who played seven One Day Internationals in 1997. He also played in 96 first-class and 155 List A matches during his career.
