= Javagal Srinath =

Indian cricketer (born 1969)

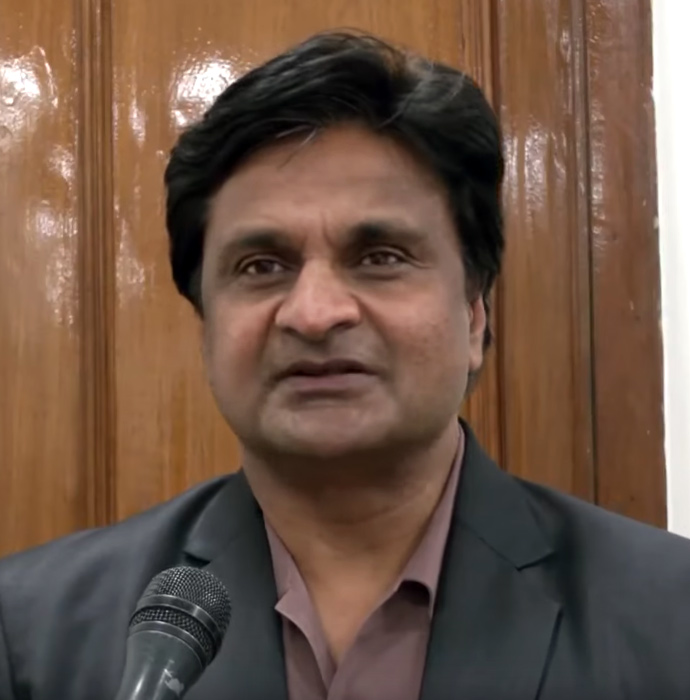
- Javagal Srinath in February 2023

Personal information
- Born: 31 August 1969 (age 57); Mysore, Mysore State, India
- Height: 6 ft 3 in (191 cm)
- Batting: Right-handed
- Bowling: Right-arm fast
- Role: Bowler

International information
- National side: India (1991–2003)
- Test debut (cap 193): 29 November 1991 v Australia
- Last Test: 30 October 2002 v West Indies
- ODI debut (cap 81): 18 October 1991 v Pakistan
- Last ODI: 23 March 2003 v Australia
- ODI shirt no.: 7

Career statistics
Competition	Test	ODI	FC	LA
Matches	67	229	147	290
Runs scored	1,009	883	2,276	1,153
Batting average	14.21	10.63	14.49	10.48
100s/50s	0/4	0/1	0/7	0/1
Top score	76	53	76	53
Balls bowled	15,104	11,935	28,618	14,981
Wickets	236	315	533	407
Bowling average	30.49	28.08	26.61	26.25
5 wickets in innings	10	3	23	4
10 wickets in match	1	0	3	0
Best bowling	8/86	5/23	9/76	5/23
Catches/stumpings	22/0	32/0	62/0	49/0
Medal record
Men's Cricket
Representing India
ICC Cricket World Cup
Runner-up	2003 South Africa-Zimbabwe-Kenya
ICC Champions Trophy
Winner	2002 Sri Lanka
ACC Asia Cup
Winner	1995 United Arab Emirates
- Source: ESPNcricinfo, 29 December 2022

Javagal Srinath (born 31 August 1969) is a former Indian cricketer and currently an ICC match referee. He is considered among India's finest fast bowlers and is the only Indian fast bowler till date to have taken more than 300 wickets in One Day Internationals. With India, Srinath was a member of the Indian team that was the joint-winners of the 2002 ICC Champions Trophy, a title they shared with Sri Lanka, and was a member of the team that were runners-up in the 2003 Cricket World Cup.

Srinath was a frontline fast bowler for the Indian cricket team until his retirement, and the second Indian pace bowler after Kapil Dev to take 200 Test match wickets. After Kapil Dev retired, Srinath led the Indian fast-bowling attack for over nine years. He remains India's second-highest One Day International wicket-taker with 315, second to Anil Kumble. In the four World Cup's he played in: 1992, 1996, 1999 and 2003, he took 44 wickets and was the joint highest wicket-taker for India in World Cups with Zaheer Khan. He is one of the fastest bowlers to have played for India.

Srinath retired from international cricket after the 2003 Cricket World Cup in South Africa.

== Personal life ==
Srinath was born in August 1969 at Mysore in Karnataka. He played cricket from an early age. He attended Marimallappa High School and has a Bachelor of Engineering degree in instrumentation from Sri Jayachamarajendra College of Engineering (SJCE) in Mysore. He married his first wife, Jyothsna, in 1999. After their divorce, he married journalist Madhavi Patravali in 2008.

== Domestic career ==
Srinath caught the eye of former Indian Test batsman Gundappa Viswanath, a selector for the state team, during a club match. He made his first-class debut for Karnataka against Hyderabad in 1989–90, taking a hat-trick in the first innings in which he bowled and taking wickets from successive balls in the second. He finished the season with 25 wickets in six matches, and took another 20 the following season. His second season involved a display of reverse swing against Maharashtra at Nehru Stadium in Pune, taking 7/93 to dismiss the home team for 311 in response to a Karnataka total of 638 on a good batting pitch.

Srinath took over 500 first-class wickets, including 96 at an average of 24.06 runs per wicket for Karnataka. He played in English county cricket for Gloucestershire in 1995 and took 87 wickets that season, including 9/76 against Glamorgan. Srinath also played county cricket for Leicestershire and Durham.

== International career ==
Srinath made his One Day International debut at Sharjah in 1991. He played 11 ODIs and two Test matches in his debut year, taking 14 ODI wickets at an average of 30.00. He was selected for the Indian team for its 1991–92 tour of Australia, making his test debut against Australia at Brisbane. He took 3/59 as the third fast bowler during the match and finished the tour with ten wickets at 55.30. With an opportunity to take the new ball against South Africa in Cape Town, he took an economical 4/33 in 27 overs and ended the tour with 12 wickets at 26.08. Because the wickets in India were conducive to spin, however, Srinath spent seven consecutive home Test matches watching from the sidelines as India fielded only two fast bowlers.

Following the retirement of Kapil Dev in late 1994, Srinath played his first home Test match, playing against the West Indies. He took five wickets and scored 60 in the second innings to be named Player of the Match. His increased opportunities coincided with an improvement in his batting, and he scored two half-centuries during the series.

Srinath was considered a very fast bowler in his early years. In the 1997–98 Test series against Australia, one of Srinath's deliveries was measured at 149.6 kilometres per hour (93.0 mph) and Zimbabwe captain Alistair Campbell considered him faster than Lance Klusener and Allan Donald at their peak. He and Grant Flower had also faced Waqar Younis and Wasim Akram. Srinath was India's only regular fast bowler for many years, and his workload is believed to have caused his injuries; he underwent surgery on his right shoulder in 1997.

=== Injuries ===
Srinath's rotator-cuff injury, diagnosed in March 1997, kept him away from cricket until November of that year and affected his speed. The injury was caused by overuse. At the time, he had 92 test wickets in 27 tests—46 in his first 18, and 46 in his last nine matches. There were some doubts about whether he would be able to play again and when he announced his retirement in November 2003, Srinath said that he thought his career was over when he was recovering from the rotator-cuff injury.

He returned from injury in 1998 and took 17 wickets in Test matches and 37 wickets in 19 ODIs at an average of 22.00—the best year of his career.

=== Late career ===
With a change of Indian captain in 2000, Srinath was given fewer overs than Anil Kumble in Test matches. He was primarily used in ODIs and Test matches played outside of India, taking 21 Test and 15 ODI wickets in 2000. He took nine wickets against Zimbabwe in Delhi, and received his last Test Player of the Match award that year.

Inactive for much of 2001 due to emerging bowlers such as Zaheer Khan and Ajit Agarkar, he played eight Test matches and 15 ODIs. His Test career ended in 2002. Although Srinath wanted to retire from ODI, at the request of Indian captain Sourav Ganguly he agreed to play until the World Cup. He participated in India's tour of New Zealand in January a few weeks before the World Cup, taking 18 wickets in seven matches.

=== Bowling ===
Srinath was the second Indian bowler (after Kapil Dev) to take 200 wickets in Test cricket, with 236. Although some critics said that Srinath's average and strike rate suffered as a result of bowling to India's predominantly dry, spin-friendly wickets, his average at home was superior to his average abroad since he could reverse-swing the ball.

== Retirement ==
Srinath toured England with the Lashings World XI team in summer 2005, and was a commentator for the India-England test series in 2006. In an interview, 1992 World Cup-winning Pakistan captain Imran Khan said that after watching Srinath bowl 150 kilometres per hour (93 mph) on Indian pitches he considered him the most underrated bowler in the world. Courtney Walsh recommended Srinath for county cricket when he was injured. Srinath is a familiar face to cricket viewers around the world as a commentator and ICC match referee. In 2010, he and former teammate Anil Kumble contested the Karnataka State Cricket Association elections. They won and Srinath, as secretary of the association, promotes young cricketers in Karnataka.

== Referee ==
In April 2006, Srinath was selected as a match referee by the International Cricket Council and served during the 2007 World Cup. He has refereed in 35 test matches, 268 ODIs and 60 T20Is.

== Honours ==
- Arjuna Award – 1999
- Honorary Doctorate from University of Mysore - 2023

== See also ==
- Elite Panel of ICC Referees
