= Lance Klusener =

South African cricketer (born 1971)

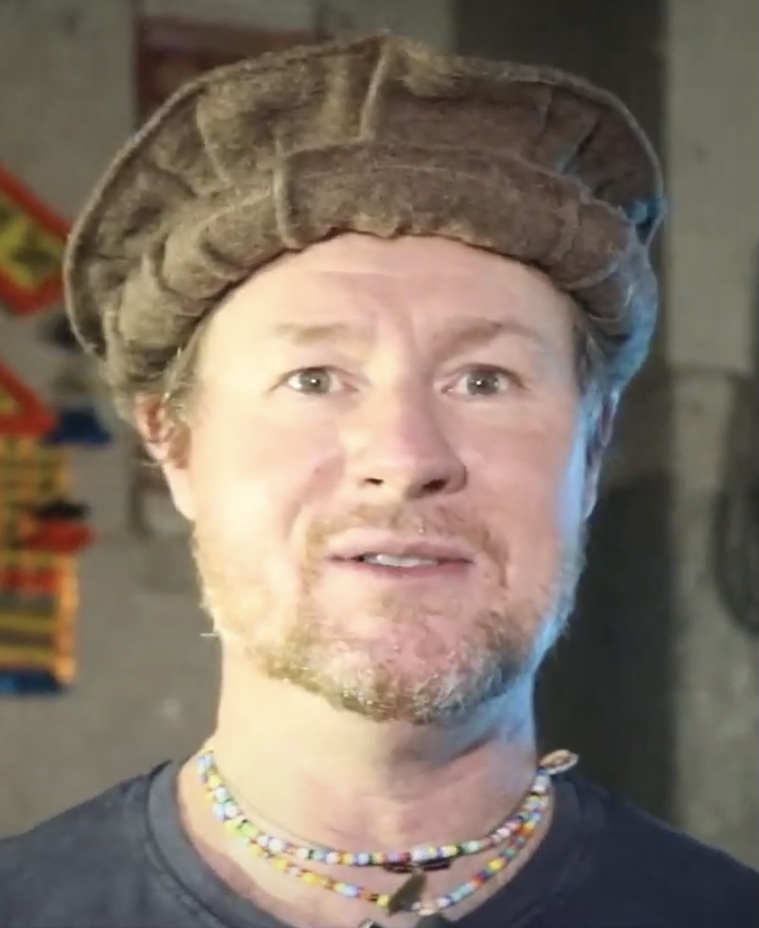
- Klusener in 2023

Personal information
- Full name: Lance Klusener
- Born: 4 September 1971 (age 55); Durban, Natal Province, South Africa
- Nickname: Zulu
- Height: 1.75 m (5 ft 9 in)
- Batting: Left-handed
- Bowling: Right arm fast-medium
- Role: All-rounder

International information
- National side: South Africa (1996–2004)
- Test debut (cap 265): 27 November 1996 v India
- Last Test: 8 August 2004 v Sri Lanka
- ODI debut (cap 40): 19 January 1996 v England
- Last ODI: 19 September 2004 v West Indies
- ODI shirt no.: 69

Domestic team information
- Years: Team
- 1991/92–2003/04: KwaZulu Natal
- 2002: Nottinghamshire
- 2003/04–2006/07: Dolphins
- 2004: Middlesex
- 2006–2008: Northamptonshire (squad no. 4)
- 2007/08–2008/09: Royal Bengal Tigers
- 2010/11: Mountaineers

Career statistics
Competition	Test	ODI	FC	LA
Matches	49	171	197	324
Runs scored	1,906	3,576	9,521	6,648
Batting average	32.86	41.10	42.69	40.04
100s/50s	4/8	2/19	21/48	3/34
Top score	174	103*	202*	142*
Balls bowled	6,887	7,336	31,735	13,459
Wickets	80	192	508	334
Bowling average	37.91	29.95	30.40	31.50
5 wickets in innings	1	6	20	8
10 wickets in match	0	0	4	0
Best bowling	8/64	6/49	8/34	6/49
Catches/stumpings	34/–	35/–	99/–	82/-
- Source: ESPNcricinfo, 14 February 2016

Lance Klusener (born 4 September 1971) is a South African cricket coach and former international cricketer. He was known for his aggressive batting and fast-medium swing bowling. Klusener was one of the best all-rounders in the world during 1990s and early 2000s and one of the pioneers of power batting as a finisher. He was popular for his ferocious batting and ability to take wickets at crucial times, often breaking important partnerships.

He is nicknamed "Zulu" because of his fluency in the Zulu language. Since his retirement he has occasionally commentated on cricket in both Zulu and Xhosa.

In September 2019, Klusener was appointed as the head coach of the Afghanistan national cricket team.

== Early life ==
Klusener grew up on a sugarcane farm north of Empangeni, attending Kwambonambi primary school with Zulu children. He later attended Durban High School and broke into the school's first team only in his final year. He underwent military service for three years which contributed to a straightforward approach to his bowling. The manager of Natal Denis Carlstein identified the potential in his bowling and he recommended Klusener to attend the provincial nets. He was later spotted by the West Indian fast bowler Malcolm Marshall who was then Natal's overseas player in the first-class cricket season. Klusener was drafted into Natal's first XI in 1993/94 season and was mentored by Malcolm Marshall.

== Career ==
=== Domestic career ===
Klusener played for KwaZulu-Natal (Nashua Dolphins) in the domestic level in South Africa between 1991 and 2004. In 2004, Northamptonshire County Cricket Club signed him on a contract running until late 2008. At Wantage Road he impressed with his fired-up seam bowling and his hard-hitting in the low middle-order. Due to family bereavements back home, it was announced that his contract with the county would not be renewed at the end of the 2008 season. In late 2007, he started playing in the Indian Cricket League Twenty20 tournament in India for the Kolkata Tigers team.

=== International career ===
Klusener made his ODI debut on 19 January 1996 against England. He made his Test debut for South Africa against India in Calcutta during the second Test in 1996/97. At the time playing primarily as a bowler, Klusener took some hammering in the first innings at the hands of Mohammad Azharuddin, who at one point hit him for five consecutive fours, but Klusener returned what would remain career-best figures of eight for 64 in the second. On his test debut he picked 8 wicket haul in a flat pitch in Kolkata, and he led from the front especially after Allan Donald had broken down. His bowling figures of 8/64 is regarded as the best bowling figures by a South African bowler in an innings on test debut.

In his fourth test appearance, he registered the then fastest-ever test century by a South African in test cricket when he raced to the milestone off 100 balls against India at Cape Town in January 1997. It was also his maiden test century, as he achieved it while batting at no 9 position. He was initially selected to the South African squad for the 50 over cricket tournament at the 1998 Commonwealth Games but he later withdrew from the tournament without featuring in any of the games and was subsequently replaced by Alan Dawson. He also raised his game in test cricket further by scoring 174 against England in a drawn test match in Port Elizabeth in December 1999 and he was awarded the player of the match.

Klusener is remembered for his contributions in One Day Internationals, in which he was a hard hitting batsman and was voted as Man of the Tournament during the 1999 World Cup. He showed glimpses of his big-hitting in the years leading to the 1999 World Cup. His baseball-style backlift and thunderous hitting lit up the tournament and nearly took South Africa to the final. He was also voted as a Wisden Cricketer of the Year in 2000.

His international career tapered off after this, mainly due to persistent ankle injuries, as well as a public dispute with the then South African captain Graeme Smith, who at a breakfast meeting shortly after his appointment to the captaincy, in which he described Klusener as a "disruptive force" to the younger players within the South African national cricket team. The quote ended up in the South African press. Later Klusener and Smith patched up their differences.

He had scored 1,906 runs in 49 matches with a highest score of 174 and took 80 wickets with best figures of 8/64 in test matches. He scored 3,576 runs in 171 ODI matches at an average of 41.1 with a highest score of 103 and took 192 wickets with a best of 6/49. He has most fifers for South Africa in ODIs with 6.

=== 1999 World Cup ===
During the 1999 Cricket World Cup, he remained not out in five consecutive innings which yielded 214 runs without being dismissed. His streak was finally ended by Gavin Larsen in the Super Six stage match against New Zealand when he was dismissed for the first time in the tournament after scoring just four runs. His finishing prowess before the New Zealand match prompted the team to promote him to no 3 position in the match against New Zealand but it backfired.

During the World Cup, he was dismissed only on two occasions out of the eight innings in which he played and averaged 142.50 in those eight innings. He still holds the record for not having been dismissed in most consecutive innings in World Cup matches. Due to his all-round performances with the bat and ball during the World Cup, he topped the ICC rankings for allrounders with a rating of 521 points. He showed his temperament in every matches for South Africa either with the bat and ball with performances including 12* & 3/66 against India, 52* off 45 balls & 3/21 against Sri Lanka, 48* and 1/16 against England, DNB & 5/21 against Kenya, 52* and 1/35 against Zimbabwe, 46* and 1/41 against Pakistan, 4 & 2/46 against New Zealand, 36 & 1/53 against Australia (Super Six), 31* off 16 balls & 0/50 against Australia in the semi-final. The only time he went wicketless in the tournament was the semi-final against Australia as he was always amongst the wickets. He was praised for his baseball-style backlift throughout the tournament. He had a strike rate of 163 in last 10 overs of 1999 WC.

He won four Man of the Match awards out of the nine matches South Africa played in the tournament. The four awards were consecutive with respect to South Africa's wins (one match in between was won by Zimbabwe). The only other South African to win Man of the Match award in this tournament was Jacques Kallis. He was criticized for his knock in a losing cause against Zimbabwe taking 58 balls to score 52 and when South Africa were bowled out for 185, he was stranded in the crease without being dismissed. His opposite number Neil Johnson who also took 1999 World Cup on storm had engineered Zimbabwe's win of the tournament against South Africa with his all-round display scoring 76 runs and taking 3/27.

His teammate Herschelle Gibbs let Klusener down when the former dropped an easy catch of Steve Waugh off Klusener's bowling in the last Super Six match, which proved out to be the turning point of the match. Waugh eventually scored a match-winning century remaining unbeaten on 120, as Australia won in the last over of the contest with two balls to spare.

The second semi-final was played between Australia and South Africa in Edgbaston, England. Australia, having been put in to bat, set a target of 214 for South Africa to chase in 50 overs. Klusener came in to bat when South Africa were 175/6 in 44.5 overs, and his big-hitting along with support from other batsmen helped South Africa enter the final over at 205/9, needing nine runs to win with only one wicket remaining. The two batsmen at the crease were Klusener (on strike) and Allan Donald.

Klusener scored consecutive fours on the first two balls of the over (bowled by Damien Fleming), levelling the scores and leaving South Africa with only 1 run to win in 4 balls with Klusener on strike. The third ball was a dot, and Donald narrowly escaped getting run out when he backed out too far and tried to get back to his crease. The fourth saw Klusener mis-hit his shot to mid-wicket fielder Mark Waugh. Klusener went for the run, although chances of a run-out were high and two balls were still remaining. However, Donald at the other end, keeping his eyes on the ball and hoping to avoid another mix-up like in the last delivery, did not see Klusener sprinting down the pitch and did not hear the call to run, and Klusener was almost at the bowler's end by the time Donald (who had also dropped his bat) began running. By then, Waugh had thrown the ball to Fleming, who rolled it to Adam Gilchrist who took the bails off at the other end, meaning Donald was run-out by some distance, thus ending the match with the scores level. However, a tie meant that Australia progressed to the final since they had beaten South Africa in the group stages of the tournament. As commentator Bill Lawry put it during the final ball:

"...this will be out surely – oh it's out, it's gonna be run out...oh, that is South Africa out – Donald did not run, I cannot believe it. Australia go into the World Cup Final – ridiculous running with two balls to go. Donald did not go, Klusener came – what a disappointing end for South Africa."

Australia went on to win the tournament, but Klusener was voted the Player of the Series.

In 2014, Klusener stated in an interview that Donald was not to blame for what happened. Klusener stated that he became impatient and, although he made it to the bowler's end, there was genuinely no run. After the match, he was cross at himself and regretted making that run.

=== Post 1999 World Cup ===
After a breakthrough World Cup tournament, many expected him to continue his strong performance from him for South Africa. He was named in South African squad for the 2000 ICC KnockOut Trophy. However, he struggled for consistency in the tours of West Indies in 2000/01 and Australia in 2001/02 which forced him out of the team for a while. He then got a recall to the South African team for both the 2002 ICC Champions Trophy and 2003 World Cup. He performed decently, despite South Africa's group stage exit from the 2003 World Cup tournament.

He was subsequently snubbed from the side for the tour of England in 2003 which raised questions about his future in the game. His omission from the English test tour of 2003 was nothing short of controversy as he took legal action against United Cricket Board of South Africa for loss of earnings as he turned down the County cricket offers after being assured of a spot in the test side. Later, United Cricket Board of South Africa and Klusener both swept the legal battle under the carpet and ended their differences.

He was again available for selection following the end of disputes and was picked for the ODI series against the West Indies in 2003/04. He also received a test recall for the tour of Sri Lanka in 2004. He was also included for the 2004 ICC Champions Trophy. He retired from international cricket in 2004.

== Coaching career ==
Klusener severed all ties with the Indian Cricket League in late 2009 and then completed a Level-three coaching course provided by Cricket South Africa in Spring 2010. He has also worked closely with the South African High Performance Program and also worked with the South Africa A cricket team.

Klusener confirmed he was in negotiations with the Bangladesh Cricket Board about becoming the team bowling coach. However, in early September 2010 the Bangladesh Cricket Board confirmed that they were still awaiting a response from Klusener. Klusener had finally turned down the offer to take over as Bangladesh's bowling coach, replacing Sri Lanka's Champaka Ramanayake. Klusener was reportedly unable to convince his wife about a permanent move to Bangladesh.

From 2012 until 2016, he was head coach of the Dolphins, whom he represented in domestic cricket during his playing career, Klusener reportedly took over the coaching job from Graham Ford during the mid domestic season in 2012 as the latter resigned midway and departed to Sri Lanka to coach the Sri Lankan national side. In February 2016, his contract with Dolphins was terminated and was told that his contract would not be renewed which also triggered Klusener to seek an arbitration proceeding over the manner of his dismissal from the Dolphins franchise.

In 2016, he started as a batting coach for the Zimbabwe national team and served in the position until 2018. He also coached the Lyca Kovai Kings in the Tamil Nadu Premier League.

In 2018, he was appointed as the head coach of Rajshahi Kings in the Bangladesh Premier League replacing Daniel Vettori.

He was named as consultant coach for Delhi team ahead of the 2018–19 Ranji Trophy season. He also served as the batting coach of Mumbai Indians and has also coached Delhi Capitals in the Indian Premier League.

In 2019, he served in an interim capacity as the assistant batting coach of South Africa for the away T20I series against India.

In July 2019, Klusener was appointed as the head coach of the Glasgow Giants for the inaugural edition of the Euro T20 Slam cricket tournament.

In September 2019, Klusener was appointed as the head coach of the Afghanistan national cricket team replacing Phil Simmons. He stepped down from the post after the 2021 ICC Men's T20 World Cup. Overall, under Klusener's tenure, Afghanistan won one out of three Test matches, three out of six ODIs and nine out of fourteen T20 internationals.

In December 2020, it was announced that he would serve as team director of Bangla Tigers during the 2021 T10 League.

In January 2022, Klusener was appointed as the head coach of the Khulna Tigers in the Bangladesh Premier League In 2022, it was reported that he initially applied for the role of head coach of Sri Lankan men's cricket team but after being shortlisted by Sri Lanka Cricket as one of the candidates, he pulled out at the eleventh hour citing personal reasons.

In March 2022, he was reappointed as batting coach of Zimbabwe men's national team.Currently he is the coach of the cricket team of Tripura, a north eastern state of India. He is one of the assistant coach of IPL team Lucknow Super Giants.

== Personal life ==
Klusener enjoys fishing. He is also an avid hunter. Lance married Isabelle Potgieter on 13 May 2000, at age 28 in Durban. They have two sons.

He is one of the goodwill partners of Cricket Foundation which is a blockchain-based platform headquartered in Singapore.

== See also ==
- List of South Africa cricketers who have taken five-wicket hauls on Test debut

Preceded by Sanath Jayasuriya	World Cup Player of the Series winner 1999	Succeeded by Sachin Tendulkar
