= List of South Africa Test cricket records =

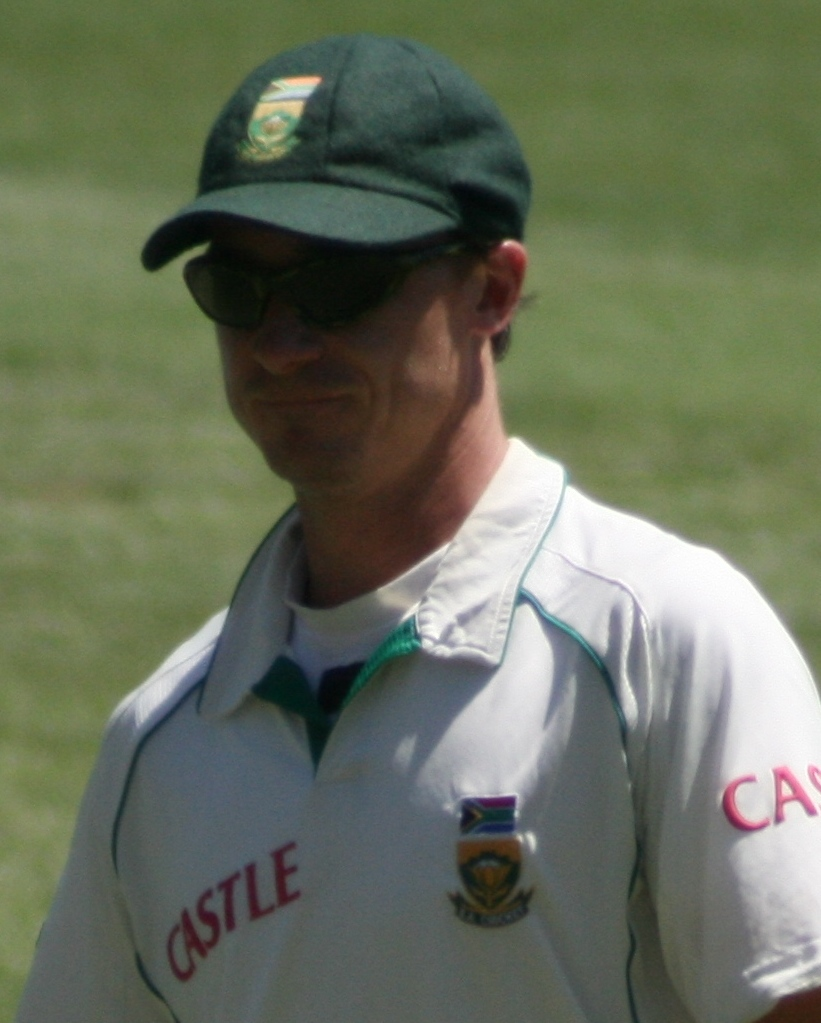
Fast bowler Dale Steyn holds the South African Test records for both most wickets (439) and most five-wicket hauls (26).

Test cricket is the oldest form of cricket played at international level. A Test match is scheduled to take place over a period of five days, (Note: For the first 50 years of Test cricket matches were played over three or four days and until the 1930s some timeless Tests were played.) (Note: In October 2017, the ICC Board approved a trial of four-day Test cricket to run through until the 2019 Cricket World Cup.) and is played by teams representing full member nations of the International Cricket Council (ICC). This is a list of South African Test cricket records. It is based on the List of Test cricket records, but concentrates solely on records dealing with the South African Test cricket team, and any cricketers who have played for them.

== Key ==
The top five records are listed for each category, except for the team wins, losses, draws and ties and the partnership records. Tied records for fifth place are also included. Explanations of the general symbols and cricketing terms used in the list are given below. Specific details are provided in each category where appropriate. All records include matches played for South Africa only, and are correct as of January 2020.

Key
Symbol	Meaning
†	Player or umpire is currently active in Test cricket
*	Player remained not out or partnership remained unbroken
♠	Test cricket record
d	Innings was declared (e.g. 8/758d)
Date	Starting date of the Test match
Innings	Number of innings played
Matches	Number of matches played
Opposition	The team India was playing against
Period	The time period when the player was active in Test cricket
Player	The player involved in the record
Venue	Test cricket ground where the match was played

== Team records ==
Matches	Won	Lost	Drawn	Tied	Win %
479	191	162	126	0	39.87
.Last Updated: 30 January 2025

=== Team wins, losses, draws and ties ===
As of November 2026, South Africa has played 483 Test matches resulting in 193 victories, 163 defeats and 126 draws for an overall winning percentage of 40.04.

Opponent	Matches	Won	Lost	Draw	Tied	% Won	% Lost	% Drew
Australia	105	29	55	21	0	27.62	52.38	20
Bangladesh	17	15	0	2	0	88.24	0	11.76
England	156	35	66	55	0	22.44	42.31	35.26
India	46	20	16	10	0	43.48	34.78	21.74
New Zealand	49	26	7	16	0	53.06	14.29	32.65
Pakistan	32	18	7	7	0	56.25	21.88	21.88
Sri Lanka	33	18	9	6	0	54.55	27.27	18.18
West Indies	34	23	3	8	0	67.65	8.82	23.53
Zimbabwe	11	10	0	1	0	90.91	0	9.09
Statistics are correct as of South Africa v Bangladesh at Wanderers Stadium, Johannesburg, 15–19 November 2026.

=== First Test series wins ===
Opponent	Year of first Home win	Year of first Away win
Afghanistan	YTP	YTP
Australia	1967	2009
Bangladesh	2002	2003
England	1906	1935
India	1992	2000
Ireland	YTP	YTP
New Zealand	1954	1932
Pakistan	1995	1997
Sri Lanka	1998	1993
West Indies	1999	2001
Zimbabwe	1999	1995
Last updated: 20 June 2020

=== First Test match wins ===
Opponent	Home		Away	
Opponent	Venue	Year	Venue	Year
Afghanistan	YTP	YTP	YTP	YTP
Australia	Johannesburg	1966	Adelaide	1911
Bangladesh	Durban	2002	Chittagong	2004
England	Johannesburg	1906	Lord's	1935
India	Port Elizabeth	1992	Kolkata	1996
Ireland	YTP	YTP	YTP	YTP
New Zealand	Durban	1953	Christchurch	1932
Pakistan	Johannesburg	1995	Faisalabad	1997
Sri Lanka	Cape Town	1998	Colombo (SSC)	1993
West Indies	Johannesburg	1998	Port of Spain	2001
Zimbabwe	Bloemfontein	1999	Harare	1995
Last updated: 20 June 2020

=== Team scoring records ===
==== Most runs in an innings ====
The highest innings total scored in Test cricket came in the series between Sri Lanka and India in August 1997. Playing in the first Test at R. Premadasa Stadium in Colombo, the hosts posted a first innings total of 6/952d. This broke the longstanding record of 7/903d which England set against Australia in the final Test of the 1938 Ashes series at The Oval. The second Test of the 2003 series against England saw South Africa set their highest innings total of 682/6d.

Rank	Score	Opposition	Venue	Date
1	682/6d	England	Lord's, London, England	31 July 2003
2	658/9d	West Indies	Sahara Stadium Kingsmead, Durban, South Africa	26 December 2003
3	651	Australia	Newlands Cricket Ground, Cape Town South Africa	19 March 2009
4	637/2d	England	The Oval, London, England	19 July 2012
5	627/7d	England	Newlands Cricket Ground, Cape Town South Africa	2 January 2016
Last updated: 20 June 2020

==== Highest successful run chases ====
South Africa's highest fourth innings total is 450/7 in an unsuccessful run chase against India at Johannesburg in December 2013. India had set a target of 457. South Africa's second highest fourth innings total of 423/7 came in another draw against England at The Oval in 1947. South Africa's highest successful run chase occurred against Australia at Perth in 2008, and is also the second highest successful fourth innings total. Australia had set South Africa a target of 414

Rank	Score	Target	Opposition	Venue	Date
1	414/4	414	Australia	WACA Ground, Perth, Australia	17 December 2008
2	340/5	335	Australia	Kingsmead, Durban, South Africa	15 March 2002
3	297/4	295	Australia	Melbourne Cricket Ground, Melbourne, Australia	6 February 1953
4	287/9	284	England	Old Wanderers, Johannesburg, South Africa	2 January 1906
5	282/5	282	Australia	Lord’s, London, England	11 June 2025
Last updated: 20 June 2020

==== Fewest runs in an innings ====
The lowest innings total scored in Test cricket came in the second Test of England's tour of New Zealand in March 1955. Trailing England by 46, New Zealand was bowled out in their second innings for 26 runs. The lowest score in Test history for South Africa is 30 scored twice against England in 1896 and 1924.

Rank	Score	Opposition	Venue	Date
1	30	England	St George's Park, Port Elizabeth, South Africa	13 February 1896
1	30	England	Edgbaston, Birmingham, England	14 June 1924
3	35	England	Newlands, Cape Town, South Africa	1 April 1899
4	36	Australia	Melbourne Cricket Ground, Melbourne, Australia	12 February 1932
5	43	England	Newlands, Cape Town, South Africa	25 March 1889
Last updated: 20 June 2020

==== Most runs conceded in an innings ====
The highest innings total scored against South Africa is by Sri Lanka when they scored 756/5d in the first Test of the South Africa's tour of Sri Lanka in 2006 at Sinhalese Sports Club Ground.

Rank	Score	Opposition	Venue	Date
1	756/5d	Sri Lanka	Sinhalese Sports Club Ground, Colombo, Sri Lanka	27 July 2006
2	747	West Indies	Antigua Recreation Ground, St. John's, Antigua and Barbuda	29 April 2005
3	654/5	England	Sahara Stadium Kingsmead, Durban, South Africa	3 March 1939
4	652/7d	Australia	Wanderers Stadium, Johannesburg, South Africa	22 February 2002
5	643/6d	India	Eden Gardens, Kolkata, India	14 February 2010
Last updated: 10 July 2025

==== Fewest runs conceded in an innings ====
The lowest innings total scored against South Africa is 45 in the first test of New Zealand's tour of South Africa in 2013

Rank	Score	Opposition	Venue	Date
1	42	Sri Lanka	Kingsmead, Durban South Africa	27 November 2024
2	45	New Zealand	Newlands Cricket Ground, Cape Town South Africa	2 January 2013
3	47	Australia	Newlands Cricket Ground, Cape Town South Africa	9 November 2011
4	49	Pakistan	Wanderers Stadium, Johannesburg, South Africa	1 February 2013
5	53	Bangladesh	Sahara Stadium Kingsmead, Durban, South Africa	31 March 2022
Last updated: 10 July 2025

=== Result records ===
A Test match is won when one side has scored more runs than the total runs scored by the opposing side during their two innings. If both sides have completed both their allocated innings and the side that fielded last has the higher aggregate of runs, it is known as a win by runs. This indicates the number of runs that they had scored more than the opposing side. If one side scores more runs in a single innings than the total runs scored by the other side in both their innings, it is known as a win by innings and runs. If the side batting last wins the match, it is known as a win by wickets, indicating the number of wickets that were still to fall.

==== Greatest win margins (by innings) ====
The fifth Test of the 1938 Ashes series at The Oval saw England win by an innings and 579 runs, the largest victory by an innings in Test cricket history. The largest victory for South Africa, which is the 17th largest, is there win against Bangladesh in the first Test of the 2017 tour at the Mangaung Oval, where the hosts won by an innings and 254 runs.

Rank	Margin	Opposition	Venue	Date
1	Innings and 273 runs	Bangladesh	Zohur Ahmed Chowdhury Stadium Bangladesh	31 October 2024
2	Innings and 254 runs	Bangladesh	Mangaung Oval, Bloemfontein, South Africa	6 October 2017
3	Innings and 236 runs	Zimbabwe	Queens Sports Club, Bulawayo, Zimbabwe	6 July 2025
4	Innings and 229 runs	Sri Lanka	Newlands, Cape Town, South Africa	2 January 2001
5	Innings and 220 runs	West Indies	Centurion Park, Centurion, South Africa	17 December 2014
Last updated: 10 July 2025

==== Greatest win margins (by runs) ====
The greatest winning margin by runs in Test cricket was England's victory over Australia by 675 runs in the first Test of the 1928–29 Ashes series. The largest victory recorded by South Africa, which is the fourth largest victory, is the final Test of the 2018 series against Australia by 492 runs.

Rank	Margin	Opposition	Venue	Date
1	492 runs	Australia	New Wanderers, Johannesburg, South Africa	30 March 2018
2	408 runs	India	Assam Cricket Association Stadium, Guwahati, India	22 November 2025
3	358 runs	New Zealand	New Wanderers, Johannesburg, South Africa	8 November 2007
4	356 runs	England	Lord's, London, England	21 July 1994
5	351 runs	West Indies	Centurion Park, Centurion, South Africa	15 January 1999
Last updated: 26 November 2025

==== Greatest win margins (by 10 wickets) ====
South Africa have won a Test match by a margin of 10 wickets on 10 occasions.

Rank	Victories	Opposition	Most recent venue	Date
1	3	England	Headingley, Leeds, England	18 July 2008
2	2	Sri Lanka	Wanderers Stadium, Johannesburg, South Africa	3 January 2021
2	2	Pakistan	Newlands Cricket Ground, Cape Town, South Africa	3 January 2025
4	1	Australia	Adelaide Oval, Adelaide, Australia	24 January 1964
4	1	West Indies	Centurion Park, Centurion, South Africa	16 January 2004
4	1	India	Sahara Stadium, Kingsmead, Durban, South Africa	26 December 2013
Last updated: 6 January 2025

==== Narrowest win margins (by runs) ====
South Africa's narrowest win by runs was against Australia in the second Test of the 1993-94 tour at Sydney Cricket Ground. Set 117 runs for victory in the final innings, Australia were bowled all out for 111 to give victory to South Africa by five runs. This was the sixth-narrowest win in Test cricket, with the narrowest being the West Indies' one-run win over Australia in 1993.

Rank	Margin	Opposition	Venue	Date
1	5 runs	Australia	Sydney Cricket Ground, Sydney, Australia	2 January 1994
2	7 runs	Sri Lanka	Asgiriya Stadium, Kandy, Sri Lanka	30 July 2000
3	17 runs	England	Wanderers Stadium, Johannesburg, South Africa	15 February 1957
4	19 runs	England	Old Wanderers Stadium, Johannesburg, South Africa	1 January 1910
5	28 runs	England	Old Wanderers Stadium, Johannesburg, South Africa	24 December 1930
Last updated: 10 July 2025

==== Narrowest win margins (by wickets) ====
South Africa's narrowest win by wickets came in the first Test of the English cricket team in South Africa in 1905-06 in January 1906. Played at the Old Wanderers Stadium, the hosts won the match by a margin of one wicket, one of only fifteen one-wicket victories in Test cricket.

Rank	Margin	Opposition	Venue	Date
1	1 wicket	England	Old Wanderers Stadium, Johannesburg, South Africa	2 January 1906
2	2 wickets	Pakistan	Centurion Park, Centurion, South Africa	26 December 2024
3	3 wickets	England	Old Trafford, Manchester, England	7 July 1955
3	3 wickets	Sri Lanka	Centurion Park, Centurion, South Africa	15 November 2002
5	4 wickets	England	Newlands, Cape Town, South Africa	7 March 1910
5	4 wickets	England	Old Wanderers Stadium, Johannesburg, South Africa	28 January 1928
5	4 wickets	West Indies	Wanderers Stadium, Johannesburg, South Africa	26 November 1998
5	4 wickets	India	Wankhede Stadium, Mumbai, India	24 February 2000
5	4 wickets	New Zealand	Wanderers Stadium, Johannesburg, South Africa	5 May 2006
5	4 wickets	Pakistan	Newlands, Cape Town, South Africa	14 February 2013
Last updated: 20 May 2025

==== Greatest loss margins (by innings) ====
The Oval in London played host the greatest defeat by an innings in Test cricket. The final Test of the 1938 Ashes saw England defeat the tourists by an innings and 579 runs, to the draw the series at one match all. South Africa's biggest defeat came at home during the Australian tour in 2002 when they lost by an innings and 360 runs at Wanderers Stadium, Johannesburg.

Rank	Margin	Opposition	Venue	Date
1	Innings and 360 runs	Australia	Wanderers Stadium, Johannesburg, South Africa	22 February 2002
2	Innings and 276 runs	New Zealand	Hagley Oval, Christchurch, New Zealand	17 February 2022
3	Innings and 259 runs	Australia	St George's Park, Port Elizabeth, South Africa	3 March 1950
4	Innings and 202 runs	England	Newlands, Cape Town, South Africa	25 March 1889
4	Innings and 202 runs	India	JSCA International Stadium Complex, Ranchi, India	19 October 2002
Last updated: 19 February 2022

==== Greatest loss margins (by runs) ====
The first Test of the 1928–29 Ashes series saw Australia defeated by England by 675 runs, the greatest losing margin by runs in Test cricket. South Africa's biggest defeat by runs was against England in the fourth Test of the 1910-11 tour at Melbourne Cricket Ground.

Rank	Margin	Opposition	Venue	Date
1	530 runs	Australia	Melbourne Cricket Ground, Melbourne, Australia	17 February 1911
2	337 runs	India	Arun Jaitley Stadium, Delhi, India	3 December 2015
3	313 runs	Sri Lanka	Sinhalese Sports Club Ground, Colombo, Sri Lanka	11 August 2004
4	312 runs	England	Newlands, Cape Town, South Africa	1 January 1957
5	288 runs	England	St George's Park, Port Elizabeth, South Africa	13 February 1896
Last updated: 20 June 2020

==== Greatest loss margins (by 10 wickets) ====
South Africa have lost a Test match by a margin of 10 wickets on 12 occasions with most recent being during the 3rd test of the South Africa's tour of Australia in 2001-02.

Rank	Occurrences	Opposition	Most recent venue	Most recent date
1	6	England	Lord's, London, England	21 June 1951
1	6	Australia	Sydney Cricket Ground, Sydney, Australia	2 January 2002
Last updated: 20 June 2020

==== Narrowest loss margins (by runs) ====
The narrowest loss of South Africa in terms of runs is by 23 runs against England in the fifth test of the South Africa's tour of England in 1998.

Rank	Margin	Opposition	Venue	Date
1	23 runs	England	Headingley Cricket Ground, Leeds, England	6 August 1998
2	29 runs	Pakistan	Kingsmead, Durban, South Africa	26 February 1998
2	32 runs	England	Old Wanderers Stadium, Johannesburg, South Africa	14 February 1899
4	40 runs	New Zealand	St George's Park, Port Elizabeth, South Africa	16 February 1962
5	52 runs	West Indies	Kensington Oval, Bridgetown, Barbados	18 April 1992
Last updated: 20 June 2020

==== Narrowest loss margins (by wickets) ====
The narrowest loss of South Africa in terms of wickets is by 1 wicket, once against England and twice against Sri Lanka.

Rank	Margin	Opposition	Venue	Date
1	1 wicket	England	Newlands, Cape Town, South Africa	1 January 1957
1	1 wicket	Sri Lanka	P Sara Oval, Colombo, Sri Lanka	4 August 2006
1	1 wicket	Sri Lanka	Kingsmead, Durban, South Africa	13 February 2019
4	2 wickets	England	Kingsmead, Durban, South Africa	16 December 1948
4	2 wickets	Australia	St George's Park, Port Elizabeth, South Africa	14 March 1997
4	2 wickets	England	Centurion Park, Centurion, South Africa	14 January 2000
4	2 wickets	Australia	Wanderers Stadium, Johannesburg, South Africa	31 March 2006
4	2 wickets	Australia	Wanderers Stadium, Johannesburg, South Africa	17 November 2011
Last updated: 20 June 2020

== Batting records ==
=== Most career runs ===
South Africa's Jacques Kallis has scored the third highest runs in Test cricket with 13,206. He is the only South African batsman to have scored more than 10,000 runs in Test cricket.

Rank	Runs	Player	Matches	Innings	Period
1	13,206	Jacques Kallis	165	278	1995–2013
2	9,282	Hashim Amla	124	215	2004–2019
3	9,253	Graeme Smith	116	203	2002–2014
4	8,765	AB de Villiers	114	191	2004–2018
5	7,289	Gary Kirsten	101	176	1993–2004
6	6,167	Herschelle Gibbs	90	154	1996–2008
7	5,498	Mark Boucher	146	204	1997–2012
8	5,347	Dean Elgar	86	152	2012–2024
9	4,554	Daryll Cullinan	70	115	1993–2001
10	4,163	Faf du Plessis	69	118	2012–2021
Last updated: 3 January 2024

=== Most runs against each team ===
Opposition	Runs	Player	Matches	Innings	Period	Ref
Afghanistan	YTP					
Australia	2,068	AB de Villiers	24	45	2005–2018	
Bangladesh	743	Graeme Smith	8	9	2002–2008	
England	2,732	Bruce Mitchell	30	57	1929–1949	
India	1,734	Jacques Kallis	18	31	2000–2013	
Ireland	YTP					
New Zealand	1,919	Jacques Kallis	18	28	1999–2013	
Pakistan	1,564	Jacques Kallis	19	33	1997–2013	
Sri Lanka	917	Daryll Cullinan	11	19	1993–2001	
West Indies	2,356	Jacques Kallis	24	43	1998–2010	
Zimbabwe	679	Jacques Kallis	6	7	1999–2005	
Last updated: 12 January 2021.

=== Fastest runs getter ===
Runs	Batsman	Match	Innings	Record Date	Reference
1,000	Graeme Smith	12	17	31 July 2003	
2,000	Graeme Pollock	21	40	5 February 1970	
3,000	Graeme Smith	37	63	24 April 2005	
4,000	Herschelle Gibbs	55	91	2 January 2004	
5,000	Herschelle Gibbs	63	108	13 January 2005	
6,000	Hashim Amla	74	128	12 February 2014	
7,000	Jacques Kallis	90	151	31 March 2005	
8,000	Jacques Kallis	101	170	18 May 2006	
9,000	Jacques Kallis	110	188	8 November 2007	
10,000	Jacques Kallis	129	217	26 February 2009	
11,000	Jacques Kallis	139	234	18 June 2010	
12,000	Jacques Kallis	147	249	17 November 2011	
13,000	Jacques Kallis	159	263	2 January 2013	
Last updated: 20 June 2020

=== Most runs in each batting position ===
Batting position	Batsman	Innings	Runs	Average	Test Career Span	Ref
Opener	Graeme Smith	196	9,030	49.08	2002–2014	
Number 3	Hashim Amla	174	7,993	49.96	2004–2019	
Number 4	Jacques Kallis	170	9,033	61.87	1995–2013	
Number 5	AB de Villiers	74	3,913	62.11	2004-2018	
Number 6	AB de Villiers	50	2,394	52.04	2004–2018	
Number 7	Mark Boucher	124	2,939	26.01	1997–2012	
Number 8	Shaun Pollock	79	1,796	30.97	1995-2008	
Number 9	Nicky Boje	37	804	26.80	2000–2006	
Number 10	Dale Steyn	61	568	11.83	2004–2019	
Number 11	Makhaya Ntini	76	344	9.05	1998-2009	
Last updated: 1 July 2020. Qualificaiotn: Batted 20 Innings at the position

=== Highest individual score ===
Two players from South Africa have scored a triple century in Test cricket. Hashim Amla first achieved the feat during South Africa's tour of England in 2012, and most recently Wiaan Mulder during South Africa's tour of Zimbabwe in 2025 to hold the record of South Africa's highest individual score.

Rank	Runs	Player	Opposition	Venue	Date
1	367*	Wiaan Mulder	Zimbabwe	Queen's Sports Club, Bulawayo, Zimbabwe	6 July 2025
2	311*	Hashim Amla	England	The Oval, London, England	19 July 2012
3	278*	AB de Villiers	Pakistan	Sheikh Zayed Cricket Stadium, Abu Dhabi, UAE	20 November 2010
4	277	Graeme Smith	England	Edgbaston, Birmingham, England	24 July 2003
5	275*	Daryll Cullinan	New Zealand	Eden Park, Auckland, New Zealand	27 February 1999
Last updated: 7 July 2025

=== Highest individual score – progression of record ===
Runs	Player	Opponent	Venue	Season
29	Bernard Tancred	England	St George's Park, Port Elizabeth, South Africa	1888-89
40	Jimmy Sinclair	England	Old Wanderers, Johannesburg, South Africa	1896-97
41	Ernest Halliwell	England	Old Wanderers, Johannesburg, South Africa	1896-97
86	Jimmy Sinclair	England	Old Wanderers, Johannesburg, South Africa	1898–99
106	Jimmy Sinclair	England	Newlands, Cape Town, South Africa	1898–99
147	Gordon White	England	Old Wanderers, Johannesburg, South Africa	1905-06
204	Aubrey Faulkner	Australia	Melbourne Cricket Ground, Melbourne, Australia	1910-11
231	Dudley Nourse	Australia	Old Wanderers, Johannesburg, South Africa	1935-36
235	Eric Rowan	England	Headingley, Leeds, England	1951
255*	Jackie McGlew	New Zealand	Basin Reserve, Wellington, New Zealand	1952–53
274	Graeme Pollock	Australia	Kingsmead, Durban, South Africa	1969-70
275*	Daryll Cullinan	New Zealand	Eden Park, Auckland, New Zealand	1998-99
277	Graeme Smith	England	Edgbaston, Birmingham, England	2003
278*	AB de Villiers	Pakistan	Sheikh Zayed Cricket Stadium, Abu Dhabi, UAE	2010-11
311*	Hashim Amla	England	The Oval, London, England	2012
367*	Wiaan Mulder	Zimbabwe	Queen's Sports Club, Bulawayo, Zimbabwe	2025
Last updated: 6 July 2025

=== Highest individual score against each team ===
Opposition	Runs	Player	Venue	Date	Ref
Afghanistan	YTP				
Australia	274	Graeme Pollock	Kingsmead, Durban, South Africa	5 February 1970	
Bangladesh	232	Graeme Smith	Zahur Ahmed Chowdhury Stadium, Chittagong, Bangladesh	29 February 2008	
England	311*	Hashim Amla	The Oval, London, England	19 July 2012	
India	253*	Hashim Amla	Vidarbha Cricket Association Stadium, Nagpur, India	6 February 2010	
Ireland	YTP				
New Zealand	275*	Daryll Cullinan	Eden Park, Auckland, New Zealand	27 February 1999	
Pakistan	278*	AB de Villiers	Sheikh Zayed Cricket Stadium, Abu Dhabi, UAE	20 November 2010	
Sri Lanka	224	Jacques Kallis	Newlands Cricket Ground, Cape Town, South Africa	3 January 2012	
West Indies	208	Hashim Amla	Centurion Park, Centurion, South Africa	17 December 2014	
Zimbabwe	367*	Wiaan Mulder	Queen's Sports Club, Bulawayo, Zimbabwe	6 July 2025	
Last updated: 7 July 2025.

=== Highest scores at each batting position ===
Batting position	Player	Score	Opponent	Venue	Date
Opener	Graeme Smith	277	England	Edgbaston Cricket Ground, Birmingham, England	24 July 2003
Number 3	Wiaan Mulder	367*	Zimbabwe	Queen's Sports Club, Bulawayo, Zimbabwe	6 July 2025
Number 4	Daryll Cullinan	275*	New Zealand	Eden Park, Auckland, New Zealand	27 February 1999
Number 5	AB de Villiers	278*	Pakistan	Sheikh Zayed Cricket Stadium, Abu Dhabi, UAE	20 November 2010
Number 6	AB de Villiers	217*	India	Sardar Patel Gujarat Stadium, Ahmedabad, India	3 April 2008
Number 7	Denis Lindsay	182	Australia	Wanderers Stadium, Johannesburg, South Africa	23 December 1966
Number 8	Mark Boucher	122*	West Indies	Newlands Cricket Ground, Cape Town, South Africa	2 January 2004
Number 9	Shaun Pollock	111	Sri Lanka	Centurion Park, Centurion, South Africa	20 January 2001
Number 10	Pat Symcox	108	Pakistan	Wanderers Stadium, Johannesburg, South Africa	14 February 1998
Number 11	Kagiso Rabada	71	Pakistan	Rawalpindi Cricket Stadium, Rawalpindi, Pakistan	22 October 2025
Last updated: 29 June 2025

=== Highest career average ===
A batsman's batting average is the total number of runs they have scored divided by the number of times they have been dismissed.

Rank	Average	Player	Innings	Runs	Not out	Period
1	60.97	Graeme Pollock	41	2,256	4	1963–1970
2	55.25	Jacques Kallis	278	13,206	39	1995–2013
3	53.81	Dudley Nourse	62	2,960	7	1935–1951
4	50.66	AB de Villiers	191	8,765	18	2004–2019
5	49.08	Colin Bland	39	1,669	5	1961–1966
Qualification: 20 innings. Last updated: 20 June 2020

=== Highest average in each batting position ===
Batting position	Batsman	Innings	Runs	Average	Career Span	Ref
Opener	Bruce Mitchell	48	2,390	56.90	1929–1949	
Number 3	Hashim Amla	174	7,993	49.96	2004–2019	
Number 4	Graeme Pollock	37	2,065	62.58	1963–1970	
Number 5	AB de Villiers	74	3,913	62.11	2004–2018	
Number 6	AB de Villiers	50	2,394	52.04	2004–2018	
Number 7	Brian McMillan	23	1,051	58.38	1992–1998	
Number 8	Mark Boucher	47	1,387	36.50	1997–2012	
Number 9	Shaun Pollock	20	534	41.07	1995–2007	
Number 10	Peter Pollock	20	292	22.46	1964–1970	
Number 11	Allan Donald	32	204	13.60	1992–2002	
Last updated: 1 July 2020. Qualification: Min 20 innings batted at position

=== Most half-centuries ===
A half-century is a score of between 50 and 99 runs. Statistically, once a batsman's score reaches 100, it is no longer considered a half-century but a century.

Sachin Tendulkar of India has scored the most half-centuries in Test cricket with 68. He is followed by the West Indies' Shivnarine Chanderpaul on 66, India's Rahul Dravid and Allan Border of Australia on 63 and in fifth with 62 fifties to his name, Australia's Ricky Ponting. Jacques Kallis is the highest rated South African with 58 fifties to his name.

Rank	Half centuries	Player	Innings	Runs	Period
1	58	Jacques Kallis	278	13,206	1995–2013
2	46	AB de Villiers	191	8,765	2004–2019
3	41	Hashim Amla	215	9,282	2004–2019
4	38	Graeme Smith	203	9,253	2002–2014
5	35	Mark Boucher	204	5,498	1997–2012
Last updated: 20 June 2020

=== Most centuries ===
A century is a score of 100 or more runs in a single innings.

Tendulkar has also scored the most centuries in Test cricket with 51. South Africa's Jacques Kallis is next on 45 and Ricky Ponting with 41 hundreds is in third.

Rank	Centuries	Player	Innings	Runs	Period
1	45	Jacques Kallis	278	13,206	1995–2013
2	28	Hashim Amla	215	9,282	2004–2019
3	27	Graeme Smith	203	9,253	2002–2014
4	22	AB de Villiers	191	8,765	2004–2019
5	21	Gary Kirsten	176	7,289	1993–2004
Last updated: 20 June 2020

=== Most double centuries ===
A double century is a score of 200 or more runs in a single innings.

Bradman holds the Test record for the most double centuries scored with twelve, one ahead of Sri Lanka's Kumar Sangakkara who finished his career with eleven. In third is Brian Lara of the West Indies with nine. England's Wally Hammond and Mahela Jayawardene of Sri Lanka both scored seven double centuries. Graeme Smith has scored the most double centuries for South Africa, with 5.

Rank	Double centuries	Player	Innings	Runs	Period
1	5	Graeme Smith	203	9,253	2002–2014
2	4	Hashim Amla	215	9,282	2004–2019
3	3	Gary Kirsten	176	7,289	1993–2004
4	2	Dudley Nourse	214	10,122	1971–1987
4	2	Graeme Pollock	62	2,960	1935–1951
4	2	Herschelle Gibbs	154	6,167	1996–2008
4	2	AB de Villiers	191	8,765	2004–2019
4	2	Jacques Kallis	278	13,206	1995–2013
Last updated: 20 June 2020

=== Most triple centuries ===
A triple century is a score of 300 or more runs in a single innings.

Hashim Amla and Wiaan Mulder are the only South Africans to have scored a triple century for South Africa.

Rank	Double centuries	Player	Innings	Runs	Period
1	1	Hashim Amla	215	9,282	2004–2019
1	1	Wiaan Mulder	46	1,440	2019–2026
Last updated: 19 November 2026

=== Most sixes ===
Rank	Sixes	Player	Innings	Runs	Period
1	96	Jacques Kallis	278	13,206	1995–2013
2	64	AB de Villiers	191	8,765	2004–2019
3	47	Herschelle Gibbs	154	6,167	1996–2008
4	36	Dale Steyn	119	1,251	2004–2019
5	35	Shaun Pollock	156	3,781	1995–2008
Last updated: 20 June 2020

=== Most fours ===
Rank	Fours	Player	Innings	Runs	Period
1	1,477	Jacques Kallis	278	13,206	1995–2013
2	1,170	Hashim Amla	215	9,282	2004–2019
3	1,164	Graeme Smith	203	9,253	2002–2014
4	1,024	AB de Villiers	191	8,765	2004–2019
5	922	Gary Kirsten	176	7,289	1993–2004
Last updated: 20 June 2020

=== Most runs in a series ===
The 1930 Ashes series in England saw Don Bradman set the record for the most runs scored in a single series, falling just 26 short of 1,000 runs. He is followed by Wally Hammond with 905 runs scored in the 1928–29 Ashes series. Aubrey Faulkner with 732 in the 1910 tour of Australia is the highest South African on the list.

Rank	Runs	Player	Matches	Innings	Series
1	732	Aubrey Faulkner	5	10	South African cricket team in Australia in 1910–11
2	714	Graeme Smith	5	9	South Africa in England in 2003
3	712	Jacques Kallis	4	6	Sir Vivian Richards Trophy in 2003-04
4	625	Jacques Kallis	5	10	Basil D'Oliveira Trophy in 2004-05
5	621	Dudley Nourse	5	9	South African cricket team in England in 1947
Last updated: 20 June 2020

=== Most ducks ===
A duck refers to a batsman being dismissed without scoring a run. Morne Morkel and Kagiso Rabada have scored the equal sixteen-highest number of ducks in Test cricket.

Rank	Ducks	Player	Matches	Innings	Period
1	23	Kagiso Rabada†	76	114	2015–2026
2	22	Morne Morkel	86	104	2006–2018
3	21	Makhaya Ntini	101	116	1998–2009
4	19	Keshav Maharaj†	63	97	2016–2026
5	17	Allan Donald	72	94	1992–2002
Last updated: 18 November 2026

=== Highest partnerships by wicket ===
In cricket, two batsmen are always present at the crease batting together in a partnership. This partnership will continue until one of them is dismissed, retires or the innings comes to a close.

A wicket partnership describes the number of runs scored before each wicket falls. The first wicket partnership is between the opening batsmen and continues until the first wicket falls. The second wicket partnership then commences between the not out batsman and the number three batsman. This partnership continues until the second wicket falls. The third wicket partnership then commences between the not out batsman and the new batsman. This continues down to the tenth wicket partnership. When the tenth wicket has fallen, there is no batsman left to partner so the innings is closed.

Wicket	Runs	First batsman	Second batsman	Opposition	Venue	Date
1st wicket	415 ♠	Neil McKenzie	Graeme Smith	Bangladesh	Zahur Ahmed Chowdhury Stadium, Chittagong, Bangladesh	29 February 2008
2nd wicket	315*	Herschelle Gibbs	Jacques Kallis	New Zealand	AMI Stadium, Christchurch, New Zealand	11 March 1999
3rd wicket	429*	Jacques Rudolph	Boeta Dippenaar	Bangladesh	Zahur Ahmed Chowdhury Stadium, Chittagong, Bangladesh	24 April 2003
4th wicket	308	Hashim Amla	AB de Villiers	West Indies	Centurion Park, Centurion, South Africa	17 December 2014
5th wicket	338	Graeme Smith	AB de Villiers	Pakistan	Dubai International Cricket Stadium, Dubai, India	23 October 2013
6th wicket	271	Ashwell Prince	Mark Boucher	Bangladesh	Centurion Park, Centurion, South Africa	26 November 2008
7th wicket	246	Jackie McGlew	Anton Murray	New Zealand	Basin Reserve, Wellington, New Zealand	6 March 1953
8th wicket	183	Temba Bavuma	Simon Harmer	Australia	St George's Park, Gqeberha, South Africa	18 October 2026
9th wicket	195 ♠	Mark Boucher	Pat Symcox	Pakistan	Wanderers Stadium, Johannesburg, South Africa	14 February 1998
10th wicket	107*	AB de Villiers	Morne Morkel	Pakistan	Sheikh Zayed Stadium, Abu Dhabi, UAE	20 November 2010
Last updated: 20 October 2026

=== Highest partnerships by runs ===
The highest Test partnership by runs for any wicket is held by the Sri Lankan pairing of Kumar Sangakkara and Mahela Jayawardene who put together a third wicket partnership of 624 runs during the first Test against South Africa in July 2006. This broke the record of 576 runs set by their compatriots Sanath Jayasuriya and Roshan Mahanama against India in 1997. South Africa's Jacques Rudolph and Boeta Dippenaar hold the 10th highest Test partnership with 429 made in 2003 against Bangladesh.

Wicket	Runs	First batsman	Second batsman	Opposition	Venue	Date
3rd wicket	429*	Jacques Rudolph	Boeta Dippenaar	Bangladesh	Zahur Ahmed Chowdhury Stadium, Chittagong, Bangladesh	24 April 2003
1st wicket	415	Neil McKenzie	Graeme Smith	Bangladesh	Zahur Ahmed Chowdhury Stadium, Chittagong, Bangladesh	29 February 2008
3rd wicket	377*	Hashim Amla	Jacques Kallis	England	The Oval, London, England	19 July 2012
1st wicket	368	Graeme Smith	Herschelle Gibbs	Pakistan	Newlands Cricket Ground, Cape Town, South Africa	2 January 2003
3rd wicket	341	Eddie Barlow	Graeme Pollock	Australia	Adelaide Oval, Adelaide, Australia	24 January 1964
Last updated: 10 July 2025

=== Highest overall partnership runs by a pair ===
Rank	Runs	Innings	Players	Highest	Average	100/50	T20I career span
1	3,923	67	Hashim Amla & Jacques Kallis	377*	61.29	11/10	2004-2013
2	3,658	65	Hashim Amla & Graeme Smith	259	57.15	10/12	2006-2014
3	3,592	64	Jacques Kallis & Gary Kirsten	249	61.93	9/17	1997-2004
4	3,274	68	Herschelle Gibbs & Graeme Smith	368	50.36	7/13	2002-2008
5	3,108	44	AB de Villiers & Jacques Kallis	256	75.8	13/7	2004-2013
An asterisk (*) signifies an unbroken partnership (i.e. neither of the batsmen was dismissed before either the end of the allotted overs or the required score being reached). Last updated: 10 July 2025

== Bowling records ==
=== Most career wickets ===
A bowler takes the wicket of a batsman when the form of dismissal is bowled, caught, leg before wicket, stumped or hit wicket. If the batsman is dismissed by run out, obstructing the field, handling the ball, hitting the ball twice or timed out the bowler does not receive credit.

Sri Lankan off spinner Muttiah Muralitharan holds the record for taking the most wickets in Test cricket with 800. South African fast bowler Dale Steyn is tenth on the list, having taken 439 wickets.

Rank	Wickets	Player	Matches	Innings	Runs	Period
1	439	Dale Steyn	93	171	10,077	2004–2019
2	421	Shaun Pollock	108	202	9,733	1995–2008
3	390	Makhaya Ntini	101	190	11,242	1998–2009
4	350	Kagiso Rabada†	75	138	7,739	2015–2026
5	330	Allan Donald	72	129	7,344	1992–2002
6	309	Morne Morkel	86	160	8,550	2006–2018
7	291	Jacques Kallis	165	270	9,497	1995–2013
8	224	Vernon Philander	64	119	5,000	2011–2020
9	220	Keshav Maharaj†	63	108	6,501	2016–2026
10	170	Hugh Tayfield	37	61	4,405	1949–1960
Last updated: 22 October 2026

=== Most career wickets against each team ===
Opposition	Wickets	Player	Matches	Innings	Runs	Period	Ref
Afghanistan	YTP						
Australia	70	Dale Steyn	15	28	1,923	2008–2016	
Bangladesh	37	Keshav Maharaj†	6	12	603	2017–2025	
England	91	Shaun Pollock	23	42	2,160	1995–2005	
India	65	Dale Steyn	14	23	1,400	2008–2018	
Ireland	YTP						
New Zealand	68	Dale Steyn	12	23	1,091	2008–2016	
Pakistan	59	Dale Steyn	13	26	1,374	2007–2019	
Sri Lanka	48	Shaun Pollock	13	24	1,072	1998–2006	
West Indies	70	Shaun Pollock	16	31	1,607	1998–2008	
Zimbabwe	23	Shaun Pollock	5	10	356	1999–2005	
Last updated: 1 March 2026

=== Fastest wicket taker ===
Wickets	Bowler	Match	Record Date	Reference
50	Vernon Philander	7	23 March 2012	
100	Vernon Philander	19	18 December 2013	
150	Hugh Tayfield	29	24 December 1949	
150	Dale Steyn	29	26 December 2008	
200	Dale Steyn	39	10 June 2010	
250	Dale Steyn	49	15 December 2011	
300	Dale Steyn	61	2 January 2013	
350	Dale Steyn	69	26 December 2013	
400	Dale Steyn	80	30 July 2015	
Last updated: 1 March 2026

=== Best figures in an innings ===
Bowling figures refers to the number of the wickets a bowler has taken and the number of runs conceded. There have been three occasions in Test cricket where a bowler has taken all ten wickets in a single innings – Jim Laker of England took 10/53 against Australia in 1956, India's Anil Kumble in 1999 returned figures of 10/74 against Pakistan and in 2021 Ajaz Patel of New Zealand took 10/119 against India. South Africa's Hugh Tayfield and Keshav Maharaj are one of 17 bowlers who have taken nine wickets in a Test match innings.

Rank	Figures	Player	Opposition	Venue	Date
1	9/113	Hugh Tayfield	England	Wanderers Stadium, Johannesburg, South Africa	15 February 1957
2	9/129	Keshav Maharaj†	Sri Lanka	Sinhalese Sports Club Cricket Ground, Colombo, Sri Lanka	20 July 2018
3	8/53	Godfrey Lawrence	New Zealand	Wanderers Stadium, Johannesburg, South Africa	26 December 1961
4	8/64	Lance Klusener	India	Eden Gardens, Kolkata, India	27 November 1996
5	8/69	Hugh Tayfield	England	Kingsmead, Durban, South Africa	25 January 1957
Last updated: 1 March 2026

=== Best figures in an innings against each team ===
Opposition	Figures	Player	Venue	Date	Reference
Afghanistan	YTP				
Australia	7/23	Hugh Tayfield	Kingsmead, Durban, South Africa	20 January 1950	
Bangladesh	7/32	Keshav Maharaj†	Kingsmead, Durban, South Africa	31 March 2022	
England	9/113	Hugh Tayfield	Wanderers Stadium, Johannesburg, South Africa	15 February 1957	
India	8/64	Lance Klusener	Eden Gardens, Kolkata, India	27 November 1996	
Ireland	YTP				
New Zealand	8/53	Godfrey Lawrence	Wanderers Stadium, Johannesburg, South Africa	26 December 1961	
Pakistan	7/29	Kyle Abbott	Centurion Park, Centurion, South Africa	22 February 2013	
Sri Lanka	9/129	Keshav Maharaj†	Sinhalese Sports Club Ground, Colombo, Sri Lanka	20 July 2018	
West Indies	7/37	Makhaya Ntini	Queen's Park Oval, Port of Spain, Trinidad & Tobago	8 April 2005	
Zimbabwe	8/71	Allan Donald	Harare Sports Club, Harare, Zimbabwe	13 October 1995	
Last updated: 1 March 2026

=== Best figures in a match ===
A bowler's bowling figures in a match is the sum of the wickets taken and the runs conceded over both innings.

No bowler in the history of Test cricket has taken all 20 wickets in a match. The closest to do so was Jim Laker of England. During the fourth Test of the 1956 Ashes series, Laker took 9/37 in the first innings and 10/53 in the second to finish with match figures of 19/90. Makhaya Ntini, with figures of 13/132, taken during the second match of the South Africa tour of West Indies in 2005, is the best in Test cricket for South Africa.

Rank	Figures	Player	Opposition	Venue	Date
1	13/132	Makhaya Ntini	West Indies	Queen's Park Oval, Port of Spain, Trinidad & Tobago	8 April 2005
2	13/144	Kagiso Rabada†	England	Centurion Park, Centurion, South Africa	22 January 2016
3	13/165	Hugh Tayfield	Australia	Melbourne Cricket Ground, Melbourne, Australia	24 December 1952
4	13/192	Hugh Tayfield	England	Wanderers Stadium, Johannesburg, South Africa	15 February 1957
5	12/127	Tip Snooke	England	Old Wanderers Stadium, Johannesburg, South Africa	10 March 1906
Last updated: 1 March 2026

=== Best career average ===
A bowler's bowling average is the total number of runs they have conceded divided by the number of wickets they have taken. Nineteenth century English medium pacer George Lohmann holds the record for the best career average in Test cricket with 10.75. J. J. Ferris, one of fifteen cricketers to have played Test cricket for more than one team, is second behind Lohmann with an overall career average of 12.70 runs per wicket.

Rank	Average	Player	Wickets	Runs	Balls	Period
1	21.10	Neil Adcock	104	2,195	6,391	1953–1962
2	21.63	Marco Jansen†	104	2,250	4,202	2021–2026
3	21.94	Kagiso Rabada†	358	7,858	14,096	2015–2026
4	22.15	Alf Hall	40	886	2,361	1923–1931
5	22.25	Allan Donald	330	7,344	15,519	1991–2002
Qualification: 2,000 balls. Last updated: 219 November 2026

=== Best career economy rate ===
A bowler's economy rate is the total number of runs they have conceded divided by the number of overs they have bowled. English bowler William Attewell, who played 10 matches for England between 1884 and 1892, holds the Test record for the best career economy rate with 1.31. South Africa's Trevor Goddard, with a rate of 1.64 runs per over conceded over his 41-match Test career, is third on the list.

Rank	Economy rate	Player	Wickets	Runs	Balls	Period
1	1.64	Trevor Goddard	123	3,226	11,736	1955–1970
2	1.74	John Watkins	29	816	2,805	1949–1957
3	1.79	Anton Murray	18	710	2,374	1952–1954
4	1.94	Hugh Tayfield	170	4,405	13,568	1949–1960
5	1.98	Tufty Mann	58	1,920	5,796	1947–1951
Qualification: 2,000 balls. Last updated: 1 March 2026

=== Best career strike rate ===
A bowler's strike rate is the total number of balls they have bowled divided by the number of wickets they have taken. As with the career average above, the top bowler with the best Test career strike rate is George Lohmann with strike rate of 34.1 balls per wicket. South Africa's Kagiso Rabada is at fourth position in this list.

Rank	Strike rate	Player	Wickets	Runs	Balls	Period
1	38.84	Duanne Olivier†	59	1,432	2,292	2017–2024
2	39.37	Kagiso Rabada†	358	7,858	14,096	2015–2026
3	40.40	Marco Jansen†	104	2,250	4,202	2021–2026
4	42.38	Dale Steyn	439	10,077	18,608	2004–2019
5	43.18	Bert Vogler	64	1,455	2,764	1906–1911
Qualification: 2,000 balls. Last updated: 19 November 2026

=== Most five-wicket hauls in an innings ===
A five-wicket haul refers to a bowler taking five wickets in a single innings. Dale Steyn is tenth on the list of most five-wicket hauls in Test cricket.

Rank	Hauls	Player	Innings	Balls	Wickets	Period
1	26	Dale Steyn	171	18,608	439	2004–2019
2	20	Allan Donald	129	15,519	330	1992–2002
3	18	Makhaya Ntini	190	20,834	390	1998–2009
3	18	Kagiso Rabada†	140	14,096	358	2015–2026
5	16	Shaun Pollock	202	24,353	408	1995–2008
Last updated: 19 November 2026

=== Most ten-wicket hauls in a match ===
A ten-wicket haul refers to a bowler taking ten or more wickets in a match over two innings. As with the five-wicket hauls above, Anil Kumble is not only behind Muralitharan, Warne and Hadlee, he is also behind Rangana Herath of Sri Lanka in taking the most ten-wicket hauls in Test cricket.

Rank	Ten-wicket hauls	Player	Matches	Balls	Wickets	Period
1	5	Dale Steyn	93	18,608	439	2004–2019
2	4	Kagiso Rabada†	73	13,436	340	2015–2025
2	4	Makhaya Ntini	101	20,834	390	1998–2009
4	3	Allan Donald	72	15,519	330	1992–2002
5	2	Hugh Tayfield	37	4,405	170	1949–1960
5	2	Fanie de Villiers	18	2,063	85	1993-1998
5	2	Vernon Philander	64	11,391	224	2011–2020
Last updated: 1 March 2026

=== Worst figures in an innings ===
The worst figures in a single innings in Test cricket came in the third Test between the West Indies at home to Pakistan in 1958. Pakistan's Khan Mohammad returned figures of 0/259 from his 54 overs in the second innings of the match. The worst figures by a South African is 0/221 that came off the bowling of Nicky Boje in the first test of the South Africa's tour of Sri Lanka in 2006.

Rank	Figures	Player	Overs	Opposition	Venue	Date
1	0/221	Nicky Boje	65	Sri Lanka	Sinhalese Sports Club Ground, Colombo, Sri Lanka	27 July 2006
2	0/180	Imran Tahir	23	Australia	Adelaide Oval, Adelaide, Australia	22 November 2012
3	0/135	Keshav Maharaj†	41.5	Australia	Melbourne Cricket Ground, Melbourne, Australia	26 December 2022
4	0/130	Makhaya Ntini	29	England	Lord's, London, England	10 July 2008
5	0/122	Jimmy Blanckenberg	36	England	The Oval, London, England	16 August 1924
Last updated: 1 March 2026

=== Worst figures in a match ===
The worst figures in a match in Test cricket were taken by South Africa's Imran Tahir in the second Test against Australia at the Adelaide Oval in November 2012. He returned figures of 0/180 from his 23 overs in the first innings and 0/80 off 14 in the third innings for a total of 0/260 from 37 overs. He claimed the record in his final over when two runs came from it – enough for him to pass the previous record of 0/259, set 54 years prior.

Rank	Figures	Player	Overs	Opposition	Venue	Date
1	0/260	Imran Tahir	37	Australia	Adelaide Oval, Adelaide, Australia	22 November 2012
2	0/221	Nicky Boje	65	Sri Lanka	Sinhalese Sports Club Ground, Colombo, Sri Lanka	27 July 2006
3	0/173	Paul Adams	173	West Indies	Newlands, Cape Town, South Africa	2 January 2004
4	0/138	Arthur Langton	43	England	Old Wanderers, Johannesburg, South Africa	24 December 1938
4	0/138	Duanne Olivier†	34	New Zealand	Bay Oval, Mount Maunganui, New Zealand	4 February 2024
Last updated:1 March 2026

=== Most wickets in a series ===
England's seventh Test tour of South Africa in 1913–14 saw the record set for the most wickets taken by a bowler in a Test series. English paceman Sydney Barnes played in four of the five matches and achieved a total of 49 wickets to his name. South Africa's Hugh Tayfield is joint 13th with his 37 wickets taken against England during the 1956–57 tour.

Rank	Wickets	Player	Matches	Series
1	37	Hugh Tayfield	5	English cricket team in South Africa in 1956–57
2	36	Bert Vogler	5	English cricket team in South Africa in 1909–10
3	33	Allan Donald	5	South African cricket team in England in 1998
4	30	Hugh Tayfield	5	South African cricket team in Australia in 1952–53
5	29	Shaun Pollock	5	West Indian cricket team in South Africa in 1998–99
5	29	Sid Pegler	6	1912 Triangular Tournament
5	29	Makhaya Ntini	4	West Indian cricket team in South Africa in 2003–04
5	29	Aubrey Faulkner	5	English cricket team in South Africa in 1909–10
Last updated: 1 March 2026

=== Hat-trick ===
In cricket, a hat-trick occurs when a bowler takes three wickets with consecutive deliveries. The deliveries may be interrupted by an over bowled by another bowler from the other end of the pitch or the other team's innings, but must be three consecutive deliveries by the individual bowler in the same match. Only wickets attributed to the bowler count towards a hat-trick; run outs do not count. In Test cricket history there have been just 44 hat-tricks, the first achieved by Fred Spofforth for Australia against England in 1879. In 1912, Australian Jimmy Matthews achieved the feat twice in one game against South Africa. The only other players to achieve two hat-tricks are Australia's Hugh Trumble, against England in 1902 and 1904, Pakistan's Wasim Akram, in separate games against Sri Lanka in 1999, and England's Stuart Broad.

No.	Bowler	Against	Inn.	Test	Dismissals	Venue	Date	Ref.
1	Geoff Griffin	England	1	2/5	M. J. K. Smith (c John Waite); Peter Walker (b); Fred Trueman (b)	(England) Lord's, London	24 June 1960	
2	Keshav Maharaj†	West Indies	2	2/2	Kieran Powell (c Anrich Nortje); Jason Holder (c Keegan Petersen); Joshua Da Silva (c Wiaan Mulder)	(Saint Lucia) Daren Sammy Cricket Ground, Gros Islet	21 June 2021	
Last updated: 1 March 2026

== Wicket-keeping records ==
The wicket-keeper is a specialist fielder who stands behind the stumps being guarded by the batsman on strike and is the only member of the fielding side allowed to wear gloves and leg pads.

=== Most career dismissals ===
A wicket-keeper can be credited with the dismissal of a batsman in two ways, caught or stumped. A fair catch is taken when the ball is caught fully within the field of play without it bouncing after the ball has touched the striker's bat or glove holding the bat, while a stumping occurs when the wicket-keeper puts down the wicket while the batsman is out of his ground and not attempting a run. South Africa's Mark Boucher holds the record for most dismissals in Test cricket as a designated wicket-keeper.

Rank	Dismissals	Player	Matches	Period
1	553 ♠	Mark Boucher	146	1997–2012
2	232	Quinton de Kock	54	2014–2021
3	152	Dave Richardson	42	1992–1998
4	141	John Waite	50	1951–1965
5	106	AB de Villiers	114	2004–2018
Last updated: 21 June 2021

=== Most career catches ===
Boucher holds the record for most catches in Test cricket as a designated wicket-keeper.

Rank	Catches	Player	Matches	Period
1	532 ♠	Mark Boucher	147	1997–2012
2	221	Quinton de Kock	54	2014–2021
3	150	Dave Richardson	42	1992–1998
4	124	John Waite	50	1951–1965
5	101	Ab de Villiers	114	2004–2018
Last updated: 21 June 2021

=== Most career stumpings ===
Bert Oldfield, Australia's fifth-most capped wicket-keeper, holds the record for the most stumpings in Test cricket with 52. Boucher has most stumpings with 23.

Rank	Stumpings	Player	Matches	Period
1	23	Mark Boucher	146	1997–2012
2	17	John Waite	50	1951–1965
3	16	Percy Sherwell	13	1906–1911
4	13	Tommy Ward	23	1912–1924
5	12	Jock Cameron	26	1927–1935
5	12	Kyle Verreynne	30	2021–2025
Last updated: 16 November 2025

=== Most dismissals in an innings ===
Four wicket-keepers have taken seven dismissals in a single innings in a Test match—Wasim Bari of Pakistan in 1979, Englishman Bob Taylor in 1980, New Zealand's Ian Smith in 1991 and most recently West Indian gloveman Ridley Jacobs against Australia in 2000.

The feat of taking 6 dismissals in an innings has been achieved by 24 wicket-keepers on 32 occasions including 4 South Africans.

Rank	Dismissals	Player	Opposition	Venue	Date
1	6	Denis Lindsay	Australia	Wanderers Stadium, Johannesburg, South Africa	23 December 1966
1	6	Mark Boucher	Pakistan	St George's Park, Port Elizabeth, South Africa	6 March 1998
1	6	Mark Boucher	Sri Lanka	Newlands, Cape Town, South Africa	19 March 1998
1	6	Mark Boucher	Zimbabwe	Centurion Park, Centurion, South Africa	11 March 2005
1	6	Mark Boucher	Sri Lanka	Centurion Park, Centurion, South Africa	11 December 2011
1	6	Ab de Villiers	Pakistan	Wanderers Stadium, Johannesburg, South Africa	1 February 2013
1	6	Quinton de Kock	England	Centurion Park, Centurion, South Africa	26 December 2019
Last updated: 10 July 2025

=== Most dismissals in a match ===
Three wicket-keepers have made 11 dismissals in a Test match, Englishman Jack Russell in 1995, South African AB de Villiers in 2013 and most recently India's Rishabh Pant against Australia in 2018.

The feat of making 10 dismissals in a match has been achieved by 4 wicket-keepers on 4 occasions.

Rank	Dismissals	Player	Opposition	Venue	Date
1	11 ♠	AB de Villiers	Pakistan	New Wanderers Stadium, Johannesburg, South Africa	1 February 2013
2	9	Dave Richardson	India	St George's Park, Port Elizabeth, South Africa	26 December 1992
2	9	Mark Boucher	Pakistan	St George's Park, Port Elizabeth, South Africa	6 March 1998
2	9	Mark Boucher	England	Headingley, Leeds, England	18 July 2008
2	9	Mark Boucher	India	Kingsmead, Durban, South Africa	26 December 2010
2	9	Quinton de Kock	Sri Lanka	Galle International Stadium, Galle, Sri Lanka	16 July 2014
Last updated: 10 July 2025

=== Most dismissals in a series ===
Brad Haddin holds the Test cricket record for the most dismissals taken by a wicket-keeper in a series. He took 29 catches during the 2013 Ashes series. South African record is held by John Waite and Mark Boucher with 26 dismissals.

Rank	Dismissals	Player	Matches	Innings	Series
1	26	John Waite	5	10	New Zealand cricket team in South Africa in 1961–62
1	26	Mark Boucher	5	10	South African cricket team in England in 1998
3	24	Denis Lindsay	5	10	Australian cricket team in South Africa in 1966–67
4	23	John Waite	5	9	New Zealand cricket team in South Africa in 1953–54
4	23	Quinton de Kock	4	7	English cricket team in South Africa in 2019-20
Last updated: 10 July 2025

== Fielding records ==
=== Most career catches ===
Caught is one of the nine methods a batsman can be dismissed in cricket. (Note: In 2017, The Laws of Cricket were amended, reducing the methods of dismissals from ten to nine, with handled the ball now covered as part of obstructing the field.) The majority of catches are caught in the slips, located behind the batsman, next to the wicket-keeper, on the off side of the field. Most slip fielders are top order batsmen.

England's Joe Root holds the record for the most catches in Test cricket by a non-wicket-keeper with 216, followed by Steve Smith of Australia on 215.

Rank	Catches	Player	Matches	Period
1	200	Jacques Kallis	165	1995–2013
2	166	Graeme Smith	116	2002–2014
3	121	Ab de Villiers	200	2004–2018
4	108	Hashim Amla	124	2004–2019
5	94	Herschelle Gibbs	90	1996–2008
Last updated: 13 March 2026

=== Most catches in a series ===
The 1920–21 Ashes series, in which Australia whitewashed England 5–0 for the first time, saw the record set for the most catches taken by a non-wicket-keeper in a Test series. Australian all-rounder Jack Gregory took 15 catches in the series as well as 23 wickets.

Rank	Catches	Player	Matches	Innings	Series
1	12	Aiden Markram†	2	4	South African cricket team in India in 2025-26
1	12	Bruce Mitchell	5	9	English cricket team in South Africa in 1930-31
1	12	Bert Vogler	5	10	English cricket team in South Africa in 1909-10
1	12	Trevor Goddard	5	10	English cricket team in South Africa in 1956-57
2	11	Jacques Kallis	3	6	Sri Lankan cricket team in South Africa in 2011–12
2	11	Ab de Villiers	4	8	Australian cricket team in South Africa in 2017-18
2	11	Dave Nourse	5	10	English cricket team in South Africa in 1922-23
Last updated: 13 March 2026

== All-round records ==
=== 1000 runs and 100 wickets ===
A total of 71 players have achieved the double of 1000 runs and 100 wickets in their Test career.

Rank	Player	Average Difference	Period	Matches	Runs	Bat Avg	Wickets	Bowl Avg
1	Jacques Kallis	22.61	1995-2013	165	13,206	55.25	291	32.63
2	Shaun Pollock	9.19	1995-2008	108	3,781	32.31	421	23.11
3	Trevor Goddard	8.23	1955-1970	41	2,516	34.46	123	26.22
4	Vernon Philander	1.71	2011-2020	64	1,779	24.04	224	22.32
5	Dale Steyn	-9.35	2004-2019	93	1,251	13.59	439	22.95
6	Kagiso Rabada†	-9.89	2015-2025	71	1,031	11.85	336	21.74
7	Keshav Maharaj†	-14.44	2016-2025	59	1,292	15.38	203	29.82
8	Nicky Boje	-17.41	2000-2006	43	1,312	25.23	100	42.65
Last updated: 1 July 2025

=== 250 runs and 20 wickets in a series ===
A total of 18 players on 24 occasions have achieved the double of 250 runs and 20 wickets in a series.

No	Player	Matches	Runs	Wickets	Series
1	Aubrey Faulkner	5	545	29	England in South Africa in 1909-10
2	Trevor Goddard	5	294	26	Australia in South Africa in 1966-67
3	Jacques Kallis	5	267	20	Sir Vivian Richards Trophy in 2000-01
4	Shaun Pollock	5	302	20	Sir Vivian Richards Trophy in 2000-01
Last updated: 22 August 2020

== Other records ==
=== Most career matches ===
India's Sachin Tendulkar holds the record for the most Test matches played with 200, with South Africa's Jacques Kallis being fourth having represented South Africa on 165 occasions.

Rank	Matches	Player	Period
1	165	Jacques Kallis	1995-2013
2	146	Mark Boucher	1997–2012
3	124	Hashim Amla	2004–2019
4	116	Graeme Smith	2002–2014
5	114	AB de Villiers	2004–2018
Last updated: 20 June 2020

=== Most consecutive career matches ===
Former English captain Alastair Cook holds the record for the most consecutive Test matches played with 159. He broke Allan Border's long standing record of 153 matches in June 2018. AB de Villiers, the South African played 98 consecutive Test matches, is sixth.

Rank	Matches	Player	Period
1	98	Ab de Villiers	2004–2015
2	75	Mark Boucher	1998–2004
3	68	Hashim Amla	2006–2013
4	60	Jacques Kallis	1997-2003
4	60	Dean Elgar	2016–2024
Last updated: 10 July 2025

=== Most matches as captain ===
Graeme Smith, who led the South African cricket team from 2003 to 2014, holds the record for the most matches played as captain in Test cricket with 109.

Rank	Matches	Player	Period
1	108	Graeme Smith	2003–2014
2	53	Hansie Cronje	1994–2000
3	36	Faf du Plessis	2016–2020
4	26	Shaun Pollock	2000-2003
5	18	Herbie Taylor	1913-1924
5	18	Dean Elgar	2017-2024
Last updated: 30 October 2024

=== Most man of the match awards ===
Rank	M.O.M. Awards	Player	Matches	Period
1	23	Jacques Kallis	165	1995–2013
2	12	Graeme Smith	116	2002–2014
3	11	Shaun Pollock	108	1995–2008
4	9	Dale Steyn	93	2004–2019
5	8	Vernon Philander	64	2011–2020
5	8	Kagiso Rabada†	66	2015–2024
5	8	Allan Donald	72	2004–2019
5	8	Gary Kirsten	101	1993–2004
Last updated: 22 September 2024

=== Most man of the series awards ===
Rank	M.O.S. Awards	Player	Matches	Period
1	9	Jacques Kallis	165	1995–2013
2	9	Dale Steyn	93	2004–2019
3	4	Allan Donald	72	2004–2019
3	4	Dean Elgar	86	2012–2024
3	4	Makhaya Ntini	101	1998–2009
3	4	AB de Villiers	114	2004–2018
3	4	Graeme Smith	116	2002–2014
Last updated: 22 September 2024

=== Youngest players ===
The youngest player to play in a Test match is claimed to be Hasan Raza at the age of 14 years and 227 days. Making his debut for Pakistan against Zimbabwe on 24 October 1996, there is some doubt as to the validity of Raza's age at the time. The youngest cricketer to play Test cricket for South Africa was Kwena Maphaka who at the age of 18 years and 270 days debuted in the third Test of the series against Pakistan in January 2025 at Newlands Cricket Ground.

Rank	Age	Player	Opposition	Venue	Date
1	18 years and 270 days	Kwena Maphaka	Pakistan	Newlands, Cape Town, South Africa	3 January 2025
2	18 years and 340 days	Paul Adams	England	St George's Park, Port Elizabeth, South Africa	26 December 1995
3	19 years and 1 day	Arthur Ochse	England	St George's Park, Port Elizabeth, South Africa	12 March 1889
4	19 years and 28 days	Dante Parkin	England	Newlands, Cape Town, South Africa	19 March 1892
5	19 years and 48 days	William Shalders	England	Newlands, Cape Town, South Africa	1 April 1899
Last updated: 28 January 2021

=== Oldest players on Debut ===
England left-arm slow bowler James Southerton is the oldest player to appear in a Test match. Playing in the very first inaugural test against Australia in 1876 at Melbourne Cricket Ground, in Melbourne, Australia, he was aged 49 years and 119 days. Omar Henry is the oldest South African Test debutant in the 1992–93 series against India at Kingsmead Cricket Ground.

Rank	Age	Player	Opposition	Venue	Date
1	40 years and 295 days	Omar Henry	India	Kingsmead, Durban, South Africa	12 November 1992
2	40 years and 56 days	Geoff Chubb	England	Trent Bridge, Nottingham, England	7 June 1951
3	39 years and 105 days	Jimmy Cook	India	Kingsmead, Durban, South Africa	12 November 1992
4	38 years and 272 days	Johnny Lindsay	England	Trent Bridge, Nottingham, England	7 June 1947
5	37 years and 150 days	Shaun von Berg	New Zealand	Seddon Park, Hamilton, New Zealand	13 February 2024
Last updated: 13 February 2024

=== Oldest players ===
England all-rounder Wilfred Rhodes is the oldest player to appear in a Test match. Playing in the fourth Test against the West Indies in 1930 at Sabina Park, in Kingston, Jamaica, he was aged 52 years and 165 days on the final day's play. The oldest South African Test player is Dave Nourse who was aged 45 years and 204 days when he represented South Africa for the final time in the 1924 tour of England at The Oval.

Rank	Age	Player	Opposition	Venue	Date
1	45 years and 204 days	Dave Nourse	England	The Oval, London, England	16 August 1924
2	44 years and 313 days	Mick Commaille	England	Newlands, Cape Town, South Africa	31 December 1927
3	43 years and 115 days	Claude Carter	England	The Oval, London, England	16 August 1924
4	42 years and 298 days	Herbie Taylor	New Zealand	Lancaster Park, Christchurch, New Zealand	27 February 1932
5	42 years and 194 days	Aubrey Faulkner	England	Lord's, London, England	28 June 1924
Last updated: 28 January 2021

== Umpiring records ==
=== Most matches umpired ===
An umpire in cricket is a person who officiates the match according to the Laws of Cricket. Two umpires adjudicate the match on the field, whilst a third umpire has access to video replays, and a fourth umpire looks after the match balls and other duties. The records below are only for on-field umpires.

Aleem Dar of Pakistan holds the record for the most Test matches umpired with 130. The current active Dar set the record in December 2019 overtaking Steve Bucknor from the West Indies mark of 128 matches. They are followed by South Africa's Rudi Koertzen who officiated in 108.

Rank	Matches	Umpire	Period
1	108	Rudi Koertzen	1992–2010
2	82	Marais Erasmus	2010–2024
3	44	Dave Orchard	1995–2004
4	26	Cyril Mitchley	1992–2000
5	17	Adrian Holdstock	2020–2025
Last updated: 10 July 2025
