= South African cricket team in Sri Lanka in 2018 =

International cricket tour

	Sri Lanka	South Africa
- Dates: 7 July – 14 August 2018
Captains	Suranga Lakmal (Tests); Angelo Mathews (ODIs and T20I)	Faf du Plessis (Tests and ODIs) (Note: Quinton de Kock captained South Africa for the last two ODIs.); JP Duminy (T20I)

Test series
- Result: Sri Lanka won the 2-match series 2–0
Most runs	Dimuth Karunaratne (356)	Faf du Plessis (105)
Most wickets	Dilruwan Perera (16)	Keshav Maharaj (16)
- Player of the series: Dimuth Karunaratne (SL)

One Day International series
- Results: South Africa won the 5-match series 3–2
Most runs	Angelo Mathews (235)	JP Duminy (227)
Most wickets	Akila Dananjaya (14)	Lungi Ngidi (10)
- Player of the series: JP Duminy (SA)

Twenty20 International series
- Results: Sri Lanka won the 1-match series 1–0
Most runs	Dinesh Chandimal (36)	Quinton de Kock (20)
Most wickets	Lakshan Sandakan (3)	Junior Dala (2); Kagiso Rabada (2); Tabraiz Shamsi (2)

The South Africa cricket team toured Sri Lanka in July and August 2018 to play two Tests, five One Day Internationals (ODIs) and a Twenty20 International (T20I) match. Originally, the tour was for three Test matches, but the third match was dropped and replaced by the ODI and T20I fixtures. The extra ODI fixtures were used as preparation for the 2019 Cricket World Cup.

Ahead of the tour, Sri Lanka Cricket (SLC) named Dinesh Chandimal as the captain of the Test side. However, Chandimal faced disciplinary charges, for his role in alleged ball-tampering during the second Test against the West Indies in Saint Lucia in June 2018. His hearing took place before the start of the first Test, with him found guilty. He received a two-match ban, with Suranga Lakmal captaining the side in his place. After the conclusion of the first Test, the independent Judicial Commissioner handed down a further eight suspension points to Chandimal, meaning that he was also suspended for the first four ODIs of the series.

Sri Lanka won the Test series 2–0.

During the ODI series, South Africa's captain, Faf du Plessis, injured himself during the third match and was ruled out of the rest of the tour, including the one-off T20I fixture. Quinton de Kock was named as the captain of South Africa for the last two ODIs of the series. JP Duminy was also named as the captain of the team for the T20I match. South Africa won the ODI series 3–2. Sri Lanka won the one-off T20I match by three wickets.

== Squads ==
Tests		ODIs		T20Is	
Sri Lanka	South Africa	Sri Lanka	South Africa	Sri Lanka	South Africa
~~Dinesh Chandimal(c)~~; Suranga Lakmal (c); Akila Dananjaya; Dhananjaya de Silva; Niroshan Dickwella (wk); Danushka Gunathilaka; Rangana Herath; Dimuth Karunaratne; Lahiru Kumara; Angelo Mathews; Kusal Mendis; Dilruwan Perera; Kusal Perera; Kasun Rajitha; Lakshan Sandakan; Roshen Silva	Faf du Plessis (c); Hashim Amla; Temba Bavuma; Theunis de Bruyn; Quinton de Kock (wk); Dean Elgar; Heinrich Klaasen; Keshav Maharaj; Aiden Markram; Lungisani Ngidi; Vernon Philander; Kagiso Rabada; Tabraiz Shamsi; Dale Steyn; Shaun von Berg	Angelo Mathews (c); Akila Dananjaya; Dhananjaya de Silva; Niroshan Dickwella (wk); Prabath Jayasuriya; Shehan Jayasuriya; Lahiru Kumara; Suranga Lakmal; Kusal Mendis; Kusal Perera; Thisara Perera; Kasun Rajitha; Lakshan Sandakan; Dasun Shanaka; Upul Tharanga	Faf du Plessis (c); Hashim Amla; Junior Dala; Quinton de Kock (wk); JP Duminy; Reeza Hendricks; Heinrich Klaasen; Keshav Maharaj; Aiden Markram; David Miller; Wiaan Mulder; Lungi Ngidi; Andile Phehlukwayo; Kagiso Rabada; Tabraiz Shamsi	Angelo Mathews (c); Dinesh Chandimal (wk); Akila Dananjaya; Dhananjaya de Silva; Binura Fernando; Shehan Jayasuriya; Lahiru Kumara; Shehan Madushanka; Kusal Mendis; Kusal Perera; Thisara Perera; Kasun Rajitha; Lakshan Sandakan; Dasun Shanaka; Upul Tharanga; Isuru Udana; Jeffrey Vandersay	JP Duminy (c); Hashim Amla; Junior Dala; Quinton de Kock (wk); Reeza Hendricks; Heinrich Klaasen; Keshav Maharaj; Aiden Markram; David Miller; Wiaan Mulder; Lungi Ngidi; Andile Phehlukwayo; Kagiso Rabada; Tabraiz Shamsi

Sri Lanka named Dimuth Karunaratne, Nishan Peiris, Isuru Udana and Jeffrey Vandersay as standby players for the ODI series. The day before the one-off T20I fixture, Isuru Udana and Kasun Rajitha were added to Sri Lanka's squad for the match.

== Tour matches ==
=== Two-day match: Sri Lanka Board XI vs South Africa ===
7–8 July 2018
Scorecard

Sri Lanka Board XI	v	South Africa
287 (78.2 overs); Angelo Mathews 92 (124); Tabraiz Shamsi 5/45 (13.2 overs)		338 (73.5 overs); Faf du Plessis 79 (85); Wanindu Hasaranga 3/72 (14 overs)

Match drawn
P. Sara Oval, Colombo
Umpires: Deepal Gunawardene (SL) and Prageeth Rambukwella (SL)

- Sri Lanka Board XI won the toss and elected to bat.
- 15 players per side (11 batting, 11 fielding).

=== One-day match: Sri Lanka Board XI vs South Africa ===
26 July 2018
09:30
Scorecard

South Africa; 293 (49.4 overs)	v	Sri Lanka Board XI; 230 (44.1 overs)
Faf du Plessis 71 (60); Prabath Jayasuriya 2/46 (10 overs)		Isuru Udana 53 (52); Wiaan Mulder 3/12 (4.1 overs)

South Africa won by 63 runs
P. Sara Oval, Colombo
Umpires: Lyndon Hannibal (SL) and Raveendra Wimalasiri (SL)

- South Africa won the toss and elected to bat.
- 15 players per side (11 batting, 11 fielding).

== Test series ==
=== 1st Test ===
12–16 July 2018 (Note: While five days of play were scheduled for each Test, the first Test reached a result in three days, and the second Test reached a result in four days.)
Scorecard

Sri Lanka	v	South Africa
287 (78.4 overs); Dimuth Karunaratne 158* (222); Kagiso Rabada 4/50 (14 overs)		126 (54.3 overs); Faf du Plessis 49 (88); Dilruwan Perera 4/46 (23 overs)
190 (57.4 overs); Dimuth Karunaratne 60 (80); Keshav Maharaj 4/58 (20 overs)		73 (28.5 overs); Vernon Philander 22* (38); Dilruwan Perera 6/32 (14 overs)

Sri Lanka won by 278 runs
Galle International Stadium, Galle
Umpires: Paul Reiffel (Aus) and Rod Tucker (Aus)
Player of the match: Dimuth Karunaratne (SL)

- Sri Lanka won the toss and elected to bat.
- Dean Elgar (SA) and Dimuth Karunaratne (SL) both played in their 50th Test.
- Kusal Mendis (SL) scored his 2,000th run in Tests.
- Dimuth Karunaratne became the fourth batsman for Sri Lanka to carry his bat in Tests.
- Kagiso Rabada (SA) became the youngest bowler to take 150 wickets in Tests.
- Dale Steyn became the joint-highest wicket-taker for South Africa in Tests (421).
- South Africa's second innings total was their lowest score since readmission, and their lowest score in Tests since scoring 72 against England in 1957.

=== 2nd Test ===
20–24 July 2018
Scorecard

Sri Lanka	v	South Africa
338 (104.1 overs); Dhananjaya de Silva 60 (109); Keshav Maharaj 9/129 (41.1 overs)		124 (34.5 overs); Faf du Plessis 48 (51); Akila Dananjaya 5/52 (13 overs)
275/5d (81 overs); Dimuth Karunaratne 85 (136); Keshav Maharaj 3/154 (40 overs)		290 (86.5 overs); Theunis de Bruyn 101 (232); Rangana Herath 6/98 (32.5 overs)

Sri Lanka won by 199 runs
Sinhalese Sports Club Ground, Colombo
Umpires: Nigel Llong (Eng) and Rod Tucker (Aus)
Player of the match: Dimuth Karunaratne (SL)

- Sri Lanka won the toss and elected to bat.
- Angelo Mathews became the ninth batsman for Sri Lanka to score 5,000 runs in Tests.
- Hashim Amla became the third batsman for South Africa to score 9,000 runs in Tests.
- Keshav Maharaj (SA) took his first ten-wicket haul in Tests.
- Quinton de Kock (SA) became the fastest wicket-keeper to take 150 dismissals in Tests, in terms of matches played (35).
- Theunis de Bruyn (SA) scored his first century in Tests.

== ODI series ==
=== 1st ODI ===
29 July 2018
10:00
Scorecard

Sri Lanka; 193 (34.3 overs)	v	South Africa; 196/5 (31 overs)
Kusal Perera 81 (72); Tabraiz Shamsi 4/33 (8.3 overs)		JP Duminy 53* (32); Akila Dananjaya 3/50 (10 overs)

South Africa won by 5 wickets
Rangiri Dambulla International Stadium, Dambulla
Umpires: Nigel Llong (Eng) and Ruchira Palliyaguruge (SL)
Player of the match: Tabraiz Shamsi (SA)

- Sri Lanka won the toss and elected to bat.
- Angelo Mathews (SL) played in his 100th ODI as captain.

=== 2nd ODI ===
1 August 2018
14:30 (D/N)
Scorecard

Sri Lanka; 244/8 (50 overs)	v	South Africa; 246/6 (42.5 overs)
Angelo Mathews 79* (111); Andile Phehlukwayo 3/45 (9 overs)		Quinton de Kock 87 (78); Akila Dananjaya 3/60 (10 overs)

South Africa won by 4 wickets
Rangiri Dambulla International Stadium, Dambulla
Umpires: Ranmore Martinesz (SL) and Paul Reiffel (Aus)
Player of the match: Quinton de Kock (SA)

- Sri Lanka won the toss and elected to bat.
- Prabath Jayasuriya and Kasun Rajitha (SL) both made their ODI debuts.
- Kagiso Rabada (SA) played in his 50th ODI.
- Suranga Lakmal (SL) took his 100th wicket in ODIs.
- Thisara Perera (SL) took his 150th wicket in ODIs.

=== 3rd ODI ===
5 August 2018
10:00
Scorecard

South Africa; 363/7 (50 overs)	v	Sri Lanka; 285 (45.2 overs)
Reeza Hendricks 102 (89); Thisara Perera 4/75 (10 overs)		Dhananjaya de Silva 84 (66); Lungi Ngidi 4/57 (8.2 overs)

South Africa won by 78 runs
Pallekele International Cricket Stadium, Kandy
Umpires: Nigel Llong (Eng) and Raveendra Wimalasiri (SL)
Player of the match: Reeza Hendricks (SA)

- Sri Lanka won the toss and elected to field.
- Reeza Hendricks (SA) made his ODI debut
- Reeza Hendricks became the third batsman for South Africa, and fourteenth overall, to score a century on ODI debut. It was also the fastest century by a batsman on ODI debut (88 balls).
- This was South Africa's highest score in ODIs in Sri Lanka.

=== 4th ODI ===
8 August 2018
14:30 (D/N)
Scorecard

Sri Lanka; 306/7 (39 overs)	v	South Africa; 187/9 (21 overs)
Dasun Shanaka 65 (34); JP Duminy 2/35 (6 overs)		Hashim Amla 40 (23); Suranga Lakmal 3/46 (5 overs)

Sri Lanka won by 3 runs (DLS method)
Pallekele International Cricket Stadium, Kandy
Umpires: Lyndon Hannibal (SL) and Paul Reiffel (Aus)
Player of the match: Dasun Shanaka (SL)

- South Africa won the toss and elected to field.
- South Africa were set a revised target of 191 runs from 21 overs due to rain.
- Junior Dala (SA) made his ODI debut.
- Quinton de Kock captained South Africa for the first time in ODIs.
- Angelo Mathews (SL) played in his 200th ODI.
- Kusal Perera (SL) scored his 2,000th run in ODIs.
- Quinton de Kock (SA) scored his 4,000th run in ODIs.

=== 5th ODI ===
12 August 2018
14:30 (D/N)
Scorecard

Sri Lanka; 299/8 (50 overs)	v	South Africa; 121 (24 overs)
Angelo Mathews 97* (97); Wiaan Mulder 2/59 (8 overs)		Quinton de Kock 54 (57); Akila Dananjaya 6/29 (9 overs)

Sri Lanka won by 178 runs
R. Premadasa Stadium, Colombo
Umpires: Nigel Llong (Eng) and Ruchira Palliyaguruge (SL)
Player of the match: Akila Dananjaya (SL)

- Sri Lanka won the toss and elected to bat.

== T20I series ==
=== Only T20I ===
14 August 2018
19:00 (N)
Scorecard

South Africa; 98 (16.4 overs)	v	Sri Lanka; 99/7 (16 overs)
Quinton de Kock 20 (11); Lakshan Sandakan 3/19 (4 overs)		Dinesh Chandimal 36* (33); Junior Dala 2/22 (4 overs)

Sri Lanka won by 3 wickets
R. Premadasa Stadium, Colombo
Umpires: Ranmore Martinesz (SL) and Ruchira Palliyaguruge (SL)
Player of the match: Dhananjaya de Silva (SL)

- South Africa won the toss and elected to bat.
- This was South Africa's lowest total in T20Is.
