= South African cricket team in Pakistan in 1997–98 =

International cricket tour

The South African national cricket team visited Pakistan in October to November 1997 and played a three-match Test series against the Pakistani national cricket team. South Africa won the Test series 1–0. South Africa were captained by Hansie Cronje and Pakistan by Saeed Anwar. In addition, the teams played in a Limited Overs International (LOI) tournament which South Africa won.

== Test series summary ==
=== 1st Test ===
6–10 October 1997
(5-day match)
Scorecard

Pakistan	v	South Africa
456 (162.5 overs); Azhar Mahmood 128* (267); SM Pollock 3/74 (37 overs)		403 (167.5 overs); G Kirsten 98 (344); Saqlain Mushtaq 5/129 (62 overs)
182/6 (57.4 overs); Inzamam-ul-Haq 56 (82); JH Kallis 2/21 (7.4 overs)

Match drawn
Rawalpindi Cricket Stadium, Rawalpindi
Umpires: Javed Akhtar (PAK) and S Venkataraghavan (IND)
Player of the match: Azhar Mahmood (PAK)

- Pakistan won the toss and elected to bat.
- Ali Naqvi, Azhar Mahmood and Mohammad Ramzan (all PAK) made their Test debuts.

=== 2nd Test ===
17–21 October 1997
(5-day match)
Scorecard

South Africa	v	Pakistan
402 (115.3 overs); AM Bacher 96 (191); Mushtaq Ahmed 4/122 (38 overs)		53/1 (17 overs); Ali Naqvi 30* (55); PL Symcox 2/0 (2 overs)

Match drawn
Sheikhupura Stadium, Sheikhupura
Umpires: KT Francis (SL) and Mohammad Nazir (PAK)

- South Africa won the toss and elected to bat.
- There was no play on the first, fourth and fifth days.
- Ali Hussain Rizvi (PAK) and MV Boucher (SA) made their Test debuts.

=== 3rd Test ===
24–27 October 1997
(5-day match)
Scorecard

South Africa	v	Pakistan
239 (68.4 overs); G Kirsten 100* (208); Wasim Akram 4/42 (16 overs)		308 (89.4 overs); Inzamam-ul-Haq 96 (169); WJ Cronje 2/6 (5 overs)
214 (69 overs); PL Symcox 55 (120); Mushtaq Ahmed 4/57 (22 overs)		92 (37.3 overs); Moin Khan 32 (79); SM Pollock 5/37 (11 overs)

South Africa won by 53 runs
Iqbal Stadium, Faisalabad
Umpires: RS Dunne (NZ) and Mian Mohammad Aslam (PAK)
Player of the match: PL Symcox (SA)

- South Africa won the toss and elected to bat.
- The match was scheduled for five days but completed in four.
