= Australian cricket team in South Africa in 2017–18 =

International cricket tour

	South Africa	Australia
- Dates: 22 February – 3 April 2018
Captains	Faf du Plessis	Steve Smith (Note: Suspended after day three of the Third Test.); Tim Paine (Note: Captained Australia for day four of the Third Test, and for the Fourth Test.)

Test series
- Result: South Africa won the 4-match series 3–1
Most runs	Aiden Markram (480)	Cameron Bancroft (223)
Most wickets	Kagiso Rabada (23)	Pat Cummins (22)
- Player of the series: Kagiso Rabada (SA)

The Australia cricket team toured South Africa between February and April 2018 to play four Test matches. It was the first four-Test series between the two teams since South Africa's readmission. Prior to the start of the tour, South African fast-bowler Morné Morkel announced that he would retire from international cricket at the end of the series. During the third Test, Morkel became the fifth bowler for South Africa to take 300 Test wickets.

The series was known for an Australian ball-tampering scandal, culminating in the bans of three Australian cricketers and the restructure of the Australian cricket governing body. During the third Test, Australian batsman Cameron Bancroft was charged with ball tampering. Captain Steve Smith and Bancroft admitted the ball tampering to match referee Andy Pycroft and the media. Consequently, Smith and vice-captain David Warner stood down from the team leadership, and wicket-keeper Tim Paine was appointed acting captain for the remainder of the match.

On 27 March 2018, Smith, Warner and Bancroft were all suspended by Cricket Australia and sent home, with Paine named as the captain for the fourth and final Test. The following day, Cricket Australia banned Smith and Warner for one year, with Bancroft receiving a nine-month ban. Smith and Bancroft were given a further one year leadership ban, with Warner receiving a lifetime leadership ban which was overturned in 2024. After the three players had returned home, Darren Lehmann, Australia's coach, announced that he would step down from his role after the conclusion of the fourth Test in Johannesburg.

South Africa went on to win the Test series 3–1. It was the first time that South Africa had beaten Australia at home since 1970.

== Squads ==
Tests
South Africa	Australia
Faf du Plessis (c); Dean Elgar (vc); Hashim Amla; Temba Bavuma; Quinton de Kock (wk); Theunis de Bruyn; AB de Villiers; Heinrich Klaasen; Keshav Maharaj; Aiden Markram; Morné Morkel; Chris Morris; Wiaan Mulder; Lungisani Ngidi; Duanne Olivier; Vernon Philander; Kagiso Rabada	Steve Smith (c); David Warner (vc); Cameron Bancroft; ~~Jackson Bird~~; Joe Burns; Pat Cummins; Peter Handscomb; Josh Hazlewood; Jon Holland; Usman Khawaja; Nathan Lyon; Mitchell Marsh; Shaun Marsh; Glenn Maxwell; Tim Paine (wk); Matt Renshaw; Jhye Richardson; Chadd Sayers; Mitchell Starc

Jackson Bird was replaced in Australia's squad by Chadd Sayers before the tour began due to injury. South Africa's Kagiso Rabada was given a two-match ban by the International Cricket Council (ICC) after he made contact with Australia's captain, Steve Smith, during the second Test, initially ruling him out of the rest of the series. On 20 March 2018, Rabada's two-match ban was overturned by the ICC, therefore allowing him to play in the rest of the series. For the last two Tests of the series, Duanne Olivier and Chris Morris were added to South Africa's squad.

Following the suspension of Steve Smith, David Warner and Cameron Bancroft after the third Test, Joe Burns, Glenn Maxwell and Matt Renshaw were added to Australia's squad for the fourth Test.

== Tour match ==
=== Three-day match: South Africa A v Australia ===
22–24 February 2018
Scorecard

South Africa A	v	Australia
220 (58.5 overs); Theunis de Bruyn 46 (43); Pat Cummins 4/32 (11 overs)		329 (90.4 overs); Pat Cummins 59* (95); Beuran Hendricks 5/83 (24.4 overs)
248 (72.5 overs); Shaun von Berg 52 (43); Mitchell Starc 4/46 (15 overs)		140/5 (29.3 overs); Shaun Marsh 39* (46); Duanne Olivier 4/74 (12.3 overs)

Australia won by 5 wickets
Willowmoore Park, Benoni
Umpires: Phillip Vosloo (SA) and Johan Cloete (SA)

- South Africa A won the toss and elected to bat.

== Test series ==
=== 1st Test ===
1–5 March 2018
Scorecard

Australia	v	South Africa
351 (110.4 overs); Mitchell Marsh 96 (173); Keshav Maharaj 5/123 (33.4 overs)		162 (51.4 overs); AB de Villiers 71* (127); Mitchell Starc 5/34 (10.4 overs)
227 (74.4 overs); Cameron Bancroft 53 (83); Keshav Maharaj 4/102 (29.4 overs)		298 (92.4 overs); Aiden Markram 143 (218); Mitchell Starc 4/75 (18 overs)

Australia won by 118 runs
Kingsmead Cricket Ground, Durban
Umpires: Kumar Dharmasena (SL) and Sundaram Ravi (Ind)
Player of the match: Mitchell Starc (Aus)

- Australia won the toss and elected to bat.
- Mitchell Marsh (Aus) scored his 1,000th run in Tests.
- Aiden Markram's (SA) score of 143 runs was the highest 4th innings score in a losing cause by an opener and also the highest by a South African batsman.

=== 2nd Test ===
9–12 March 2018 (Note: While five days of play were scheduled for each Test, the second and third Tests reached a result within four days.)
Scorecard

Australia	v	South Africa
243 (71.3 overs); David Warner 63 (100); Kagiso Rabada 5/96 (21 overs)		382 (118.4 overs); AB de Villiers 126* (146); Pat Cummins 3/79 (24 overs)
239 (79 overs); Usman Khawaja 75 (136); Kagiso Rabada 6/54 (22 overs)		102/4 (22.5 overs); AB de Villiers 28 (26); Nathan Lyon 2/44 (9 overs)

South Africa won by 6 wickets
St George's Park, Port Elizabeth
Umpires: Kumar Dharmasena (SL), Chris Gaffaney (NZ) and Sundaram Ravi (Ind)
Player of the match: Kagiso Rabada (SA)

- Australia won the toss and elected to bat.
- Sundaram Ravi (Ind) took up the on-field umpiring duties in the absence of Chris Gaffaney from day 2 onwards.
- Shaun Marsh (Aus) scored his 2,000th run in Tests.

=== 3rd Test ===
22–25 March 2018
Scorecard

South Africa	v	Australia
311 (97.5 overs); Dean Elgar 141* (284); Pat Cummins 4/78 (26 overs)		255 (69.5 overs); Cameron Bancroft 77 (103); Morné Morkel 4/87 (21 overs)
373 (112.2 overs); Aiden Markram 84 (145); Pat Cummins 3/67 (27 overs)		107 (39.4 overs); David Warner 32 (67); Morné Morkel 5/23 (9.4 overs)

South Africa won by 322 runs
Newlands Cricket Ground, Cape Town
Umpires: Richard Illingworth (Eng) and Nigel Llong (Eng)
Player of the match: Morné Morkel (SA)

- South Africa won the toss and elected to bat.
- Dean Elgar (SA) scored his 3,000th run in Tests. Elgar also became the first player to carry his bat twice in the same year, and the second batsman to carry his bat three times in Tests.
- Steve Smith (Aus) equalled the joint record of taking five catches as a non-wicket-keeper in a Test innings, becoming the eleventh fielder to achieve this.
- Morné Morkel became the fifth bowler for South Africa to take 300 wickets in Tests.
- Tim Paine replaced Steve Smith as captain of Australia on day four.
- Nathan Lyon became the sixth bowler for Australia to take 300 wickets in Tests.

==== Ball tampering ====
On the third day of the third Test, Australia's Cameron Bancroft was shown on television coverage, also shown live at the ground, to have tampered with the ball with a small, yellow object. Bancroft later revealed the object to be a short length of yellow adhesive tape to which dirt and grit had adhered, forming an abrasive surface, though four days later, Cricket Australia confirmed that the object was actually sandpaper. At the end of the day's play, both Bancroft and captain Steve Smith admitted to ball tampering, with Smith knowing of the plan in advance of Bancroft's actions. Andy Pycroft, the match referee, charged Bancroft with a Level 2 offence of attempting to alter the condition of the ball. Smith said it was a "big mistake" but stated he would not be standing down.

Smith and vice-captain David Warner subsequently stood aside from leadership roles for the remainder of the Test, with Tim Paine taking over as acting captain. The International Cricket Council (ICC) suspended Smith for one match, handed him four demerit points and fined him 100% of his match fee. Cameron Bancroft was handed three demerit points and fined 75% of his match fee.

On 27 March 2018, Cricket Australia CEO James Sutherland announced that as a result of the preliminary investigation Smith, Warner and Bancroft had been charged with bringing the game into disrepute, suspended and sent home. Matt Renshaw, Joe Burns and Glenn Maxwell were recalled to the squad for the fourth Test to replace them. On 28 March, Cricket Australia released their findings and the sanctions to be imposed. Smith and Bancroft respectively received 12 and 9 month bans from international and domestic cricket in Australia, and neither would be considered for a leadership role for a further 12 months after that ban finishes. Warner received an identical 12 month ban, and would never be considered again for a leadership position. All three were encouraged to return to club level cricket to reconnect with the general cricket community.

=== 4th Test ===
30 March – 3 April 2018
Scorecard

South Africa	v	Australia
488 (136.5 overs); Aiden Markram 152 (216); Pat Cummins 5/83 (28.5 overs)		221 (70 overs); Tim Paine 62 (96); Vernon Philander 3/30 (18 overs)
344/6d (105 overs); Faf du Plessis 120 (178); Pat Cummins 4/58 (18 overs)		119 (46.4 overs); Joe Burns 42 (80); Vernon Philander 6/21 (13 overs)

South Africa won by 492 runs
Wanderers Stadium, Johannesburg
Umpires: Ian Gould (Eng) and Nigel Llong (Eng)
Player of the match: Vernon Philander (SA)

- South Africa won the toss and elected to bat.
- Tim Paine became the 46th captain of Australia in Tests, following Steve Smith's suspension.
- Chadd Sayers (Aus) made his Test debut.
- Vernon Philander (SA) took his 200th wicket in Tests.
- South Africa's victory was the biggest margin in Tests, in terms of runs, since Australia beat England by 562 runs in August 1934.
- This was Australia's second largest defeat by number of runs in Tests.
- This was Morné Morkel's last international match.
