= South African cricket team in Sri Lanka in 1993 =

International cricket tour

	Sri Lanka	South Africa
- Dates: 22 August – 19 September 1993
Captains	Arjuna Ranatunga	Kepler Wessels

Test series
- Result: South Africa won the 3-match series 1–0
Most runs	Arjuna Ranatunga (250)	Daryll Cullinan (237); Hansie Cronje(237)
Most wickets	Muttiah Muralitharan (16)	Brett Schultz (20)
- Player of the series: Brett Schultz

One Day International series
- Results: 3-match series drawn 1–1
Most runs	Roshan Mahanama (101)	Jonty Rhodes (78)
Most wickets	Champaka Ramanayake (4); Sanath Jayasuriya (4)	Allan Donald (5); Pat Symcox (5)

With South Africa now re-established in international sport, its national team made an inaugural tour of Sri Lanka in 1993 and played 3 Tests. South Africa won the series 1–0 with 2 matches drawn:

== Test series summary ==
=== 1st Test ===
25–30 August 1993
(5-day match)
Scorecard

Sri Lanka	v	South Africa
331 (127.2 overs); HP Tillakaratne 92 (222); AA Donald 5/69 (28 overs)		267 (112.5 overs); AC Hudson 90 (274); M Muralitharan 5/104 (39 overs)
300/6 dec (80 overs); A Ranatunga 131 (140); PL Symcox 3/75 (21 overs)		251/7 (112 overs); JN Rhodes 101* (107); PA de Silva 2/35 (17 overs)

Match drawn
Tyronne Fernando Stadium, Moratuwa
Umpires: BL Aldridge (NZ) and KT Francis (SL)
Player of the match: A Ranatunga (SL)

- Sri Lanka won the toss and elected to bat.
- 27 August was taken as a rest day.
- CE Eksteen and PL Symcox (both SA), and PB Dassanayake and PK Wijetunge (both SL) made their Test debuts.

=== 2nd Test ===
6–10 September 1993
(5-day match)
Scorecard

Sri Lanka	v	South Africa
168 (62 overs); ST Jayasuriya 44 (79); BN Schultz 5/48 (20 overs)		495 (181 overs); WJ Cronje 122 (295); M Muralitharan 5/101 (54 overs)
119 (43 overs); PA de Silva 24 (76); BN Schultz 4/58 (16 overs)

South Africa won by an innings and 208 runs
Sinhalese Sports Club Ground, Colombo
Umpires: BL Aldridge (NZ) and TM Samarasinghe (SL)
Player of the match: BN Schultz (SA)

- Sri Lanka won the toss and elected to bat.
- 9 September was taken as a rest day.
- The match was scheduled for five days but completed in three.
- HDPK Dharmasena (SL) made his Test debut.

=== 3rd Test ===
14–19 September 1993
(5-day match)
Scorecard

South Africa	v	Sri Lanka
316 (121.1 overs); DJ Cullinan 102 (237); M Muralitharan 4/64 (35.1 overs)		296/9 dec (139.5 overs); PA de Silva 82 (263); BN Schultz 5/63 (36.5 overs)
159/4 (61 overs); WJ Cronje 73* (179); CPH Ramanayake 1/26 (10 overs)

Match drawn
P Saravanamuttu Stadium, Colombo
Umpires: BL Aldridge (NZ) and BC Cooray (SL)
Player of the match: DJ Cullinan (SA)

- South Africa won the toss and elected to bat.
- 17 September was taken as a rest day.
- There was no play on the final day.

== One Day Internationals (ODIs) ==
The series was drawn 1-1, with one no-result.

=== 1st ODI ===
22 August 1993
Scorecard

Sri Lanka; 179/5 (41.3 overs)	v	South Africa; 52/4 (14 overs)
UC Hathurusingha 51 (85); PL Symcox 2/28 (9 overs)		WJ Cronje 22 (33); M Muralitharan 2/6 (3 overs)

No result
Asgiriya Stadium, Kandy
Umpires: BC Cooray and PT Manuel

- South Africa won the toss and elected to field.
- The match was reduced before play started to 46 overs per side.
- The Sri Lanka innings was reduced to 41.3 overs.
- The South Africa innings was reduced to 25 overs and the target to 107 runs.
- PL Symcox (SA) made his ODI debut.

=== 2nd ODI ===
2 September 1993 (D/N)
Scorecard

South Africa; 222/7 (50 overs)	v	Sri Lanka; 98 (34 overs)
AC Hudson 48 (80); ST Jayasuriya 4/53 (10 overs)		HP Tillakaratne 20 (52); BM McMillan 3/12 (5 overs)

South Africa won by 124 runs
Khettarama Stadium, Colombo
Umpires: DN Pathirana and TM Samarasinghe
Player of the match: BM McMillan (SA)

- South Africa won the toss and elected to bat.
- PB Dassanayake (SL) made his ODI debut.

=== 3rd ODI ===
4 September 1993 (D/N)
Scorecard

Sri Lanka; 198/9 (50 overs)	v	South Africa; 154 (46.1 overs)
PA de Silva 61* (89); PL Symcox 2/33 (10 overs)		RP Snell 51 (61); CPH Ramanayake 4/17 (8.1 overs)

Sri Lanka won by 44 runs
Khettarama Stadium, Colombo
Umpires: KT Francis and PT Manuel
Player of the match: PA de Silva (SL)

- Sri Lanka won the toss and elected to bat.
- RPAH Wickramaratne (SL) made his ODI debut.
