= Geoff Chubb =

South African cricketer

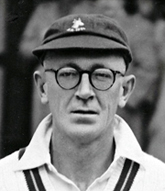

Personal information
- Born: 12 April 1911; East London, Cape Province
- Died: 28 August 1982 (aged 71); East London, Cape Province
- Batting: Right-handed
- Bowling: Right-arm medium-fast

International information
- National side: South Africa
- Test debut: 7 June 1951 v England
- Last Test: 16 August 1951 v England

Career statistics
Competition	Test	First-class
Matches	5	49
Runs scored	63	835
Batting average	10.50	18.15
100s/50s	0/0	0/5
Top score	15*	71*
Balls bowled	1,425	9,423
Wickets	21	160
Bowling average	27.47	23.91
5 wickets in innings	2	7
10 wickets in match	0	0
Best bowling	6/51	7/54
Catches/stumpings	0/–	12/–
- Source: Cricinfo, 1 February 2020

Geoffrey Walter Ashton Chubb (12 April 1911 – 28 August 1982) was a South African cricketer who played five Test matches for South Africa on the tour of England in 1951 aged 40.

He first played first-class cricket in 1931–32 as an opening batsman for Border, making 64 on debut and playing five matches that season. He played twice for Transvaal in 1936–37 and once in 1939–40, batting in the middle order and opening the bowling. In his one match in 1939–40 he took 4 for 24 and 4 for 43 and scored 71 not out in an innings victory over Eastern Province.

After World War II, during which he spent three years as a prisoner of war, he resumed playing for Transvaal, enjoying reasonable success as a bowler between 1945–46 and 1948–49. He played no first-class matches in 1949–50, but returned in 1950–51 and displayed the best form of his career, taking 33 wickets at 14.66 and helping Transvaal to victory in the Currie Cup. He began the season with 5 for 35 and 2 for 27 in an innings victory over Rhodesia and also took 5 for 34 and 2 for 66 against Western Province and his best figures of 7 for 54 and 2 for 10 against Natal.

On the 1951 tour of England he bowled more overs and took more wickets than anyone else: 809.4 overs, and 76 wickets at 26.38. Opening the bowling with Cuan McCarthy, he headed South Africa's Test bowling averages, taking 21 wickets at an average of 27.47, but couldn't prevent England taking the series 3–1. His best figures were 6 for 51 in the first innings of the Third Test; he also took 5 for 77 in the first innings of the Second Test. On the second day of the Fifth Test he bowled unchanged from 11.50 a.m. to 3.30 p.m. Wisden commented that he "went through the tour always willing to keep an end going as long as the captain desired ... His was an exceptional debut in the world of Test cricket." Outside the Tests he took 5 for 21 against Glamorgan in May, and also 5 for 21 against Somerset in August.

He retired following the series, becoming a national selector and serving two terms as President of the South African Cricket Association.

Unusually for an opening bowler, he wore spectacles while playing.
