= South African cricket team in Bangladesh in 2003 =

	Bangladesh	South Africa
- Dates: 24 April – 5 May
Captains	Khaled Mahmud	Graeme Smith

Test series
- Result: South Africa won the 2-match series 2–0
Most runs	Habibul Bashar (182)	Jacques Rudolph (293)
Most wickets	Mohammad Rafique (6)	Paul Adams (12)

The South African national cricket team toured Bangladesh in April and May 2003 and played a two-match Test series against the Bangladeshi national cricket team. South Africa won the Test series 2–0. South Africa were captained by Graeme Smith and Bangladesh by Khaled Mashud.

== Test series ==
=== 1st Test ===
24–28 April 2003 (Note: While five days of play was scheduled for each test, first Test reached a result in four days.)
Scorecard

Bangladesh	v	South Africa
173 (65.3 overs); Habibul Bashar 60 (87); Paul Adams 5/37 (12.3 overs)		470/2d (130.5 overs); Jacques Rudolph 222 (383); Tapash Baisya 1/70 (23 overs)
237 (82.4 overs); Habibul Bashar 75 (108); Paul Adams 5/69 (18.4 overs)

South Africa won by an innings and 60 runs
M. A. Aziz Stadium, Chittagong
Umpires: Billy Bowden (NZ) and Steve Bucknor (WI)
Player of the match: Jacques Rudolph (RSA)

- Bangladesh won the toss and elected to bat.

=== 2nd Test ===
1–5 May 2003 (Note: While five days of play was scheduled for each test, second Test reached a result in four days.)
Scorecard

South Africa	v	Bangladesh
330 (113.2 overs); Mark Boucher 71 (134); Mohammad Rafique 6/77 (37.2 overs)		102 (35.5 overs); Khaled Mahmud 20* (39); Makhaya Ntini 3/32 (11 overs)
		210 (83 overs)(f/o); Habibul Bashar 33 (90); Robin Peterson 3/46 (27 overs)

South Africa won by an innings and 18 runs
Bangabandhu National Stadium, Dhaka
Umpires: Billy Bowden (NZ) and Steve Bucknor (WI)
Player of the match: Mohammad Rafique (Ban)

- South Africa won the toss and elected to bat.
