= Kagiso Rabada =

South African cricketer (born 1995)

- Rabada in 2026

Personal information
- Born: 25 May 1995 (age 31); Johannesburg, Gauteng, South Africa
- Nickname: KG
- Height: 6 ft 1 in (185 cm)
- Batting: Left-handed
- Bowling: Right-arm fast
- Role: Bowler

International information
- National side: South Africa (2014–present)
- Test debut (cap 323): 5 November 2015 v India
- Last Test: 20 October 2025 v Pakistan
- ODI debut (cap 114): 10 July 2015 v Bangladesh
- Last ODI: 5 March 2025 v New Zealand
- ODI shirt no.: 25
- T20I debut (cap 62): 5 November 2014 v Australia
- Last T20I: 12 September 2025 v England
- T20I shirt no.: 25

Domestic team information
- Years: Team
- 2013/14–2023/24: Gauteng
- 2013/14–2020/21: Lions
- 2016: Kent
- 2017–2021: Delhi Capitals
- 2018–2019: Jozi Stars
- 2022–2024: Punjab Kings
- 2023–present: MI Cape Town
- 2023: MI New York
- 2025–: Gujarat Titans

Career statistics
Competition	Test	ODI	T20I	FC
Matches	76	106	79	96
Runs scored	1,176	401	184	1,400
Batting average	12.78	14.85	14.15	12.61
100s/50s	0/2	0/0	0/0	0/2
Top score	72	31*	22	72
Balls bowled	14,096	5,444	1,697	18,044
Wickets	358	168	83	433
Bowling average	21.94	27.45	28.65	22.56
5 wickets in innings	18	2	0	21
10 wickets in match	4	0	0	5
Best bowling	7/112	6/16	3/18	9/33
Catches/stumpings	34/–	41/–	26/–	43/–
Medal record
Men's cricket
Representing South Africa
ICC World Test Championship
Winner	2023–2025
ICC T20 World Cup
Runner-up	2024 West Indies & USA
ICC U19 World Cup
Winner	2014 UAE
- Source: ESPNcricinfo, 19 November 2026

Kagiso Rabada (born 25 May 1995) is a South African professional cricketer who plays as a right-arm fast bowler for the South Africa national team. He also represents MI Cape Town in the SA20 and the Gujarat Titans in the Indian Premier League. Since making his senior international debut in 2014, Rabada has established himself as one of the leading fast bowlers of his generation, holding one of the best bowling strike rates in Test cricket history. He has been a pivotal figure in the national team's successes, including their victory in the 2023–2025 ICC World Test Championship.

By January 2018, he had topped both the ODI bowler rankings and the Test bowler rankings aged 22. In July 2018, he became the youngest bowler to take 150 wickets in Tests. In July 2016, Rabada became the first cricketer to win six awards at Cricket South Africa's annual dinner, including the prize for Cricketer of the Year. In June 2018, he again won six awards at CSA's annual dinner, including Cricketer of the Year, Test Cricketer and ODI Cricketer of the Year. In August 2018, Wisden named him the best young player in the world. He is one of the few bowlers to have taken a hat-trick in two different formats: ODIs and T20Is.

== Domestic career ==
Rabada made his debut for the Gauteng in the CSA Provincial One-Day Competition against Border in December 2013.

Rabada was chosen to represent South Africa's Under-19 team for the 2014 ICC Under-19 Cricket World Cup. For the victorious South Africans, he was their best bowler claiming the 2nd most wickets (14) in the tournament at an economy rate of 3.10. He also claimed the best figures of the tournament: 6/25 against Australia A. This led to him being dubbed "the fastest and most feared bowler in the competition".

Rabada's performances in the Under-19 World Cup saw him catapulted into the Lions franchise for their last two games of the Sunfoil Series season. He took 7 wickets for 186 in these two matches.

In February 2015, Rabada took a record 14 wickets in a match for Lions against Dolphins, including 9 for 33 in the second innings. His 14 for 105 are the best figures in the franchise era of South African cricket.

In February 2016, it was announced that Rabada had signed a short-term deal to play county cricket for Kent County Cricket Club in June and July of the English domestic season, passing up the opportunity of an IPL contract to gain experience in English conditions. He played in two County Championship and six T20 matches for the county during his spell in England.

In October 2018, he was named Jozi Stars' squad for the first edition of the Mzansi Super League T20 tournament. In September 2019, he was named in the squad for the Jozi Stars team for the 2019 Mzansi Super League tournament. In April 2021, he was named in Gauteng's squad, ahead of the 2021–22 cricket season in South Africa.

== Indian Premier League ==
In February 2017, Rabada was bought by the Delhi Daredevils team for the 2017 Indian Premier League for INR 50 million. In January 2018, he was bought again by Delhi (Delhi Capitals) in the 2018 IPL auction but was later ruled out of the season due to a back injury.

He was retained again ahead of 2019 Indian Premier League by Delhi Capitals. He played 12 matches in the league stage before leaving for national duty. He picked up 25 wickets and become the highest wicket taker for DC and overall second highest wicket taker of that season. DC qualified for the playoffs for the first time since 2012 IPL season. In the 2020 Indian premier League, he become the highest wicket taker of the season by picking up 30 wickets in 17 matches he played. In both seasons, Rabada played a vital role in his team's success.

In the 2022 IPL mega auction, Rabada was bought by the Punjab Kings for ₹9.25 crore (US$990,000). In April 2023, he took his 100th IPL wicket in his 64th IPL match, becoming the fastest bowler, in terms of matches, to reach the milestone in the competition.

In 2025, Rabada was bought by Gujarat Titans for ₹10.75 crore (US$1.1 million). He played only four games and taking only two wickets during the 2025 edition of the IPL due to a drug ban. In IPL 2026, Radaba won the purple cap after taking 29 wickets.

Rabada holds the record for fastest bowler to 50 and 100 IPL wickets, in terms of matches.

== International career ==
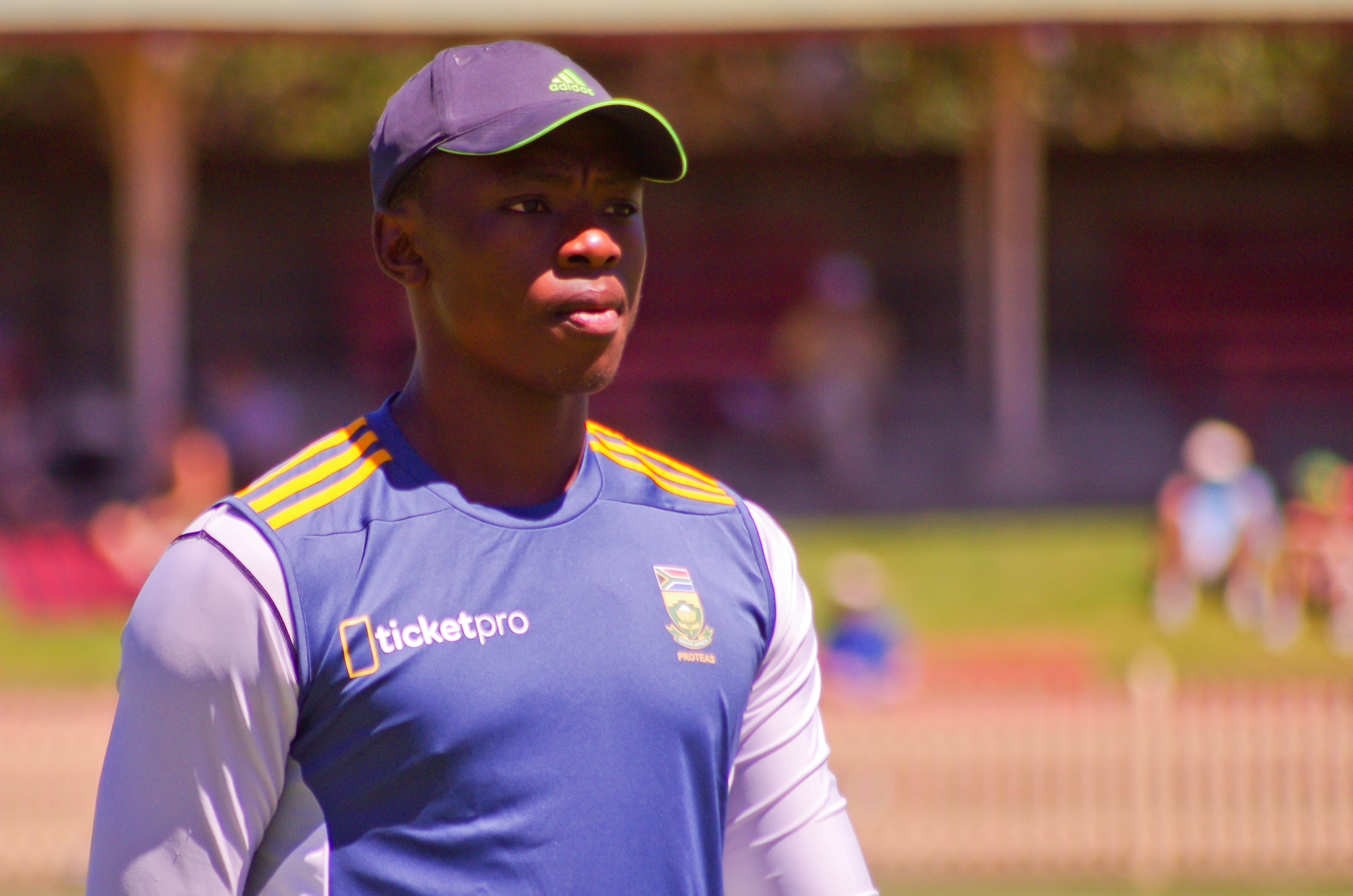
Rabada training in 2014

Rabada made his Twenty20 International debut for South Africa against Australia on 5 November 2014.

Rabada made his One Day International debut for South Africa against Bangladesh on 10 July 2015, achieving best figures of 6/16 on debut. He also became only the second player, after Taijul Islam, to take a hat-trick on debut in an ODI match. He made his Test debut for South Africa against India on 5 November 2015. In the fourth Test of England's 2015–16 tour of South Africa, he finished with figures of 13/144 helping his team win the game. In the process, he became the youngest South African to take a ten-wicket haul in a Test, and the figures were his team's second best ever, after Makhaya Ntini's 13/132.

Rabada's first ten-wicket haul in a Test match came in 2016 against England during the 4th Test at Centurion. He took 13 wickets in the match, including two five wicket hauls, and returned his best innings bowling figures of 7/112 in the England first innings. His second ten-wicket haul came in 2017 against Sri Lanka at Cape Town. During the first Test at Lord's in South Africa's 2017 tour of England, Rabada was suspended for the second Test at Trent Bridge following an altercation with Ben Stokes after using "inappropriate language" after dismissing Stokes on the first day.

Rabada bowling in 2016

As well as the five-fors he took in the matches when he took ten wickets, as of June 2017 he had taken a total of five five-wicket hauls in Test matches, the first of which was earlier in England's 2016 tour of South Africa. He repeated the feat in Australia in 2016 at the WACA. He was the man of the match in this fixture.

Rabada took 4/39 in the third ODI match of the South African tour in England in 2017. Following his performance in the match, Rabada became top ranked ODI bowler in the world displacing countryman Imran Tahir as per the ICC ODI bowler rankings and became youngest player (aged 22) to top the ODI rankings since Saqlain Mushtaq in 1998.

During the first test of India's tour of South Africa in 2018 at Newlands, Rabada took 3/34 and 2/41 in the first and second innings. Following his performance in the match, Rabada became top ranked Test bowler in the world as per the ICC Test bowler rankings displacing England bowler James Anderson.

In the second test match against Australia, Rabada took 11 wickets for 150 runs ultimately winning man of the match awards. This performance earned him top spot in ICC Test bowler rankings with 902 points, standing 15 points above James Anderson. He became the fourth South African bowler to cross 900 points after Vernon Philander, Shaun Pollock and Dale Steyn.

In July 2018 during the first test against Sri Lanka, Rabada surpassed the record of Harbhajan Singh to become the youngest ever bowler to take 150 wickets in Test cricket and also became the third fastest South African to reach 150 test wickets in terms of matches (31).

In 2018, he took the most wickets in Tests by any bowler, with 52 dismissals. In March 2019, Rabada took his 100th wicket in ODIs in the second ODI against Sri Lanka. In April 2019, he was named in South Africa's squad for the 2019 Cricket World Cup. Rabada became only the 8th South African bowler to pick 200 Test wickets as Hasan Ali in the 1st Test of the South African tour of Pakistan in 2021.

In September 2021, Rabada was named in South Africa's squad for the 2021 ICC Men's T20 World Cup. On 6 November 2021, in South Africa's final match of the tournament, against England, Rabada became the first bowler for South Africa to take a hat-trick in T20I cricket. In January 2022, Rabada played in his 50th Test match, in the third match of the series against India. On Day 2 of the first test match of the series against England in August 2022, Rabada took his first five-for at Lord's which earned him a place on the coveted honours board. He is only the fourth South African bowler to achieve this feat since re-admission after Allan Donald, Makhaya Ntini and Vernon Philander.

In May 2024, he was named in South Africa’s squad for the 2024 ICC Men's T20 World Cup tournament.

Rabada took his 300th Test wicket on 21 October 2024, on the first day of South Africa's match against Bangladesh, becoming the 39th bowler to reach the milestone.

== Award History ==
Kagiso Rabada: Award History
Year	Award / Accolade	Organization / Tournament	Category / Notes	Result
2014	Under-19 World Cup	International Cricket Council (ICC)	Tournament Winner (South Africa U19)	1st place, gold medalist(s)
2016	SA Cricketer of the Year	Cricket South Africa (CSA)	Highest National Individual Honour	1st place, gold medalist(s)
2016	Test Cricketer of the Year	Cricket South Africa (CSA)	National Performance	1st place, gold medalist(s)
2016	ODI Cricketer of the Year	Cricket South Africa (CSA)	National Performance	1st place, gold medalist(s)
2016	SA Players' Player of the Year	Cricket South Africa (CSA)	Voted by Peers	1st place, gold medalist(s)
2016	SA Fans' Player of the Year	Cricket South Africa (CSA)	Voted by Public	1st place, gold medalist(s)
2016	Delivery of the Year	Cricket South Africa (CSA)	Individual Ball	1st place, gold medalist(s)
2018	SA Cricketer of the Year	Cricket South Africa (CSA)	Highest National Individual Honour	1st place, gold medalist(s)
2018	Test Cricketer of the Year	Cricket South Africa (CSA)	National Performance	1st place, gold medalist(s)
2018	ODI Cricketer of the Year	Cricket South Africa (CSA)	National Performance	1st place, gold medalist(s)
2018	SA Players' Player of the Year	Cricket South Africa (CSA)	Voted by Peers	1st place, gold medalist(s)
2018	SA Fans' Player of the Year	Cricket South Africa (CSA)	Voted by Public	1st place, gold medalist(s)
2018	Delivery of the Year	Cricket South Africa (CSA)	Dismissal of David Warner (Newlands)	1st place, gold medalist(s)
2018	Best Young Player in the World	Wisden Cricketers' Almanack	Global Under-23 Player Award	1st place, gold medalist(s)
2020	Purple Cap	Indian Premier League (IPL)	Leading Wicket-Taker (30 Wickets — Delhi Capitals)	1st place, gold medalist(s)
2022	Test Cricketer of the Year	Cricket South Africa (CSA)	National Performance	1st place, gold medalist(s)
2022	Men's Test Team of the Year	International Cricket Council (ICC)	Global Team of the Year	Named
2023	Test Cricketer of the Year	Cricket South Africa (CSA)	National Performance	1st place, gold medalist(s)
2024	Men's T20 World Cup	International Cricket Council (ICC)	Tournament Runner-Up (South Africa)	2nd place, silver medalist(s)
2025	Betway SA20 Championship	Cricket South Africa / SA20	Tournament Winner (MI Cape Town)	1st place, gold medalist(s)
2025	World Test Championship (WTC)	International Cricket Council (ICC)	Tournament Winner (South Africa)	1st place, gold medalist(s)
2026	Purple Cap	Indian Premier League (IPL)	Leading Wicket-Taker (Tournament Leader)	1st place, gold medalist(s)

== International five-wicket hauls ==
Test five-wicket hauls by Kagiso Rabada
No.	Bowling Figures	Overs	Innings	Against	Venue	Country	Date	Result
1	5/78	23.1	2	England	Wanderers Stadium, Johannesburg	South Africa	14 January 2016	England won by 7 wickets
2	7/112	29	2	England	Centurion Park, Centurion	South Africa	22 January 2016	South Africa won by 280 runs
3	6/32	10.4	4	England	Centurion Park, Centurion	South Africa	22 January 2016	South Africa won by 280 runs
4	5/92	31	4	Australia	WACA Ground, Perth	Australia	3 November 2016	South Africa won by 177 runs
5	6/55	17	4	Sri Lanka	Newlands Cricket Ground, Cape Town	South Africa	2 January 2017	South Africa won by 282 runs
6	5/33	13.5	2	Bangladesh	Mangaung Oval, Bloemfontein	South Africa	6 October 2017	South Africa won by an innings and 254 runs
7	5/30	11	3	Bangladesh	Mangaung Oval, Bloemfontein	South Africa	6 October 2017	South Africa won by an innings and 254 runs
8	5/96	21	1	Australia	St George's Park, Port Elizabeth	South Africa	9 March 2018	South Africa won by 6 wickets
9	6/54	22	3	Australia	St George's Park, Port Elizabeth	South Africa	9 March 2018	South Africa won by 6 wickets
10	5/34	20	3	West Indies	Darren Sammy Cricket Ground, Rodney Bay	Saint Lucia	10 June 2021	South Africa won by and innings and 63 runs
11	5/60	19	2	New Zealand	Hagley Oval, Christchurch	New Zealand	25 February 2022	South Africa won by 198 runs
12	5/52	19	1	England	Lord's, London	England	17 August 2022	South Africa won by and innings and 12 runs
13	6/50	15	4	West Indies	Centurion Park, Centurion	South Africa	28 February 2023	South Africa won by 87 runs
14	5/59	20	1	India	Centurion Park, Centurion	South Africa	26 December 2023	South Africa won by and innings and 32 runs
15	6/46	17.5	3	Bangladesh	Sher-e-Bangla National Cricket Stadium, Dhaka	Bangladesh	21 October 2024	South Africa won by 7 wickets
16	5/37	9	2	Bangladesh	Zahur Ahmed Chowdhury Stadium, Chittagong	Bangladesh	29 October 2024	South Africa won by an innings and 273 runs
17	5/51	15.4	1	Australia	Lord's, London	England	11 June 2025	South Africa won by 5 wickets
18	5/70	22	1	Bangladesh	Wanderers Stadium, Johannesburg	South Africa	15 November 2026	South Africa won by 9 wickets

ODI five-wicket hauls by Kagiso Rabada
No.	Bowling Figures	Overs	Innings	Against	Venue	Country	Date	Result
1	6/16	8	1	Bangladesh	Sher-e-Bangla National Cricket Stadium, Mirpur	Bangladesh	10 July 2015	South Africa won by 8 wickets
2	5/39	10	1	Bangladesh	Wanderers Stadium, Johannesburg	South Africa	20 March 2022	South Africa won by 7 wickets

== Drug ban ==
On 1 April 2025, Rabada was given a provisional suspension after a sample he provided following an SA20 match on 21 January was positive for a recreational drug. He admitted the offence and was given a three-month ban which was reduced to one-month after he successfully completed a substance abuse treatment programme. The drug involved was not revealed. On 5 May he cleared to resume playing cricket. On 11 May 2025, the SA Institute of Drug Free Sport revealed that the drug involved was cocaine; Rabada had taken the drug out of competition but it was still in his system by the time of testing.

== Other ventures ==
Kingdom Kome in 2021

In 2020 Kagiso Rabada and Cameron Scott founded Kingdom Kome Productions, their first project is a short film called "The Ring of Beasts".

== Personal life ==
Rabada's father is a doctor and his mother Florence is a lawyer. He is of Venda and Tswana ancestry.

== See also ==
- List of One Day International cricket hat-tricks
- List of cricketers who have taken five-wicket hauls on ODI debut
