= South African cricket team in Zimbabwe in 1995–96 =

International cricket tour

The South African national cricket team toured Zimbabwe in October 1995 and played a one-match Test series against the Zimbabwean national cricket team. South Africa won the Test series 1–0. South Africa were captained by Hansie Cronje and Zimbabwe by Andy Flower. In addition, the teams played a two-match series of Limited Overs Internationals (LOI) which South Africa won 2–0.

== Test series summary ==
=== Only Test ===
13–16 October 1995
(5-day match)
Scorecard

Zimbabwe	v	South Africa
170 (65.1 overs); HH Streak 53 (66); BN Schultz 4/54 (21 overs)		346 (103 overs); AC Hudson 135 (236); BC Strang 5/101 (32 overs)
283 (104 overs); A Flower 63 (114); AA Donald 8/71 (33 overs)		108/3 (38 overs); WJ Cronje 56* (104); ACI Lock 2/37 (13 overs)

South Africa won by 7 wickets
Harare Sports Club, Harare
Umpires: DR Shepherd (ENG) and RB Tiffin (ZIM)
Player of the match: AA Donald (SA)

- Zimbabwe won the toss and elected to bat.
- The match was scheduled for five days but completed in four.
- ACI Lock and CB Wishart (both ZIM) made their Test debuts.

== One Day Internationals (ODIs) ==
=== 1st ODI ===
21 October 1995
Scorecard

South Africa; 303/5 (50 overs)	v	Zimbabwe; 169/7 (50 overs)
BM McMillan 127 (120); HH Streak 2/54 (10 overs)		ADR Campbell 68* (110); BM McMillan 2/13 (5 overs)

South Africa won by 134 runs
Harare Sports Club, Harare
Umpires: QJ Goosen and ID Robinson
Player of the match: BM McMillan (SA)

- Zimbabwe won the toss and elected to field.
- N Boje (SA) and HK Olonga (ZIM) made their ODI debuts.

=== 2nd ODI ===
22 October 1995
Scorecard

South Africa; 239 (49.2 overs)	v	Zimbabwe; 127 (42.5 overs)
JN Rhodes 53 (47); HH Streak 4/25 (10 overs)		DL Houghton 25 (40); WJ Cronje 4/33 (10 overs)

South Africa won by 112 runs
Harare Sports Club, Harare
Umpires: ID Robinson and RB Tiffin
Player of the match: HH Streak (ZIM)

- South Africa won the toss and elected to bat.
- GFJ Liebenberg and PJR Steyn (both SA) made their ODI debuts.
