= Pakistani cricket team in South Africa in 1994–95 =

International cricket tour

Pakistan cricket team in South Africa in 1994–95
- Date: 30 November 1994 – 23 January 1995
- Location: South Africa
- Result: South Africa won the only Test
- Player of the series: PS de Villiers
Teams
- South Africa: Pakistan
Captains
- WJ Cronje: Saleem Malik
Most runs
- BM McMillan (146) G Kirsten (104): Inzamam-ul-Haq (114); Saleem Malik (100)
Most wickets
- PS de Villiers (10) BM McMillan (4) AA Donald (4): Aaqib Javed (5); Wasim Akram (4)

The Pakistani cricket team toured South Africa in the 1994–95 season. On the tour they played two first-class tour matches, three one-day matches and a single Test match. They also competed in a quadrangular tournament against New Zealand, South Africa and Sri Lanka, entitled the Mandela Trophy. They lost the best-of-three final series 2–0 to South Africa, having topped the table in the group stage. They lost the only Test by 324 runs.

== Squads ==
Tests
South Africa	Pakistan
WJ Cronje (captain); G Kirsten; PJR Steyn; JB Commins; DJ Cullinan; JN Rhodes; MJR Rindel; BM McMillan; DJ Richardson (wicket-keeper); CE Eksteen; SD Jack; PS de Villiers; AA Donald	Saeed Anwar; Aamer Sohail; Shakeel Ahmed; Inzamam-ul-Haq; Saleem Malik (captain); Basit Ali; Asif Mujtaba; Ijaz Ahmed; Rashid Latif (vice-captain, wicket-keeper); Moin Khan (wicket-keeper); Ata-ur-Rehman; Waqar Younis; Aaqib Javed; Kabir Khan; Manzoor Elahi; Akram Raza

Wasim Akram missed the South African leg of the tour with sinus trouble and was replaced by Ata-ur-Rehman. Aamer Nazir joined the tour party when Waqar Younis returned home injured.

== Tour matches ==
=== Nicky Oppenheimer XI v Sri Lankans ===
30 November 1994
Scorecard

Pakistanis; 349/7d (55 overs)	v	Nicky Oppenheimer XI; 168/5 (32.5 overs)
Saleem Malik 135 retired out SD Jack 2/70 (10 overs)		MJR Rindel 100*; Waqar Younis 2/41 (8 overs)

Match drawn
NF Oppenheimer Ground, Randjesfontein

This match did not have List A status.

=== 50-over: Transvaal Invitation XI v Pakistanis ===
7 December 1994
Scorecard

Pakistanis; 262/7 (50 overs)	v	Transvaal Invitation XI; 211 (49.4 overs)
Ijaz Ahmed 112; BM White 2/38 (8 overs)		MW Rushmere 55; Akram Raza 3/33 (10 overs)

Pakistanis won by 51 runs
Lenasia Stadium, Johannesburg
Player of the match: Ijaz Ahmed (Pakistanis)

This match did not have List A status.

=== 50-over: Eastern Cape Invitation XI v Pakistanis ===
20 December 1994
Scorecard

Pakistanis; 260/7 (50 overs)	v	Eastern Cape Invitation XI; 117 (32 overs)
Asif Mujtaba 101; W Wiblin 2/30 (6 overs)		S Abrahams 77*; Ata-ur-Rehman 5/18 (7 overs)

Pakistanis won by 143 runs
Place of Water, Ntselamanzi, Alice
Umpires: M Gajjar and G Pieterse

This match did not have List A status.

=== First-class: Western Province v Pakistanis ===
26–29 December 1994
Scorecard

Western Province	v	Pakistanis
436 (129.2 overs); HD Ackerman 118 (175); Manzoor Elahi 3/81 (20 overs)		308 (98 overs); Asif Mujtaba 55 (199); DG Payne 3/62 (21 overs)
270/8d (95.3 overs); JH Kallis 74 (163); Kabir Khan 4/45 (16.3 overs)		206 (53 overs); Asif Mujtaba 65 (115); DB Rundle 6/51 (13 overs)

Western Province won by 192 runs
Newlands Cricket Ground, Cape Town
Umpires: M Bagus and R Brooks

- Western Province won the toss and elected to bat.

=== First-class: Natal v Pakistanis ===
4–7 January 1995
Scorecard

Natal	v	Pakistanis
391 (97.4 overs); DN Crookes 83 (89); Kabir Khan 4/70 (18 overs)		247 (70.4 overs); Waqar Younis 55 (60); L Klusener 4/63 (15 overs)
347/7d (95.2 overs); NC Johnson 114 (213); Asif Mujtaba 4/74 (22.2 overs)		259 (68.1 overs); Inzamam-ul-Haq 77 (112); DN Crookes 4/40 (13.1 overs)

Natal won by 232 runs
Kingsmead Cricket Ground, Durban
Umpires: WA Diedricks and DL Orchard

- Pakistanis won the toss and elected to field.

== Mandela Trophy ==
Pakistan played in a quadrangular tournament with New Zealand, South Africa and Sri Lanka. Played in a round-robin format, all four teams played each other once, with the top two teams going through to a best-of-three final series to decide the winner.

=== Group stage ===
Place	Team	Played	Won	Lost	NR	Points
1	Pakistan	6	5	1	0	10
2	South Africa	6	4	2	0	8
3	Sri Lanka	6	2	3	1	5
4	New Zealand	6	0	5	1	1

=== Final series ===
South Africa won the best of three final series against Pakistan 2–0.

==== 1st Final ====
10 January 1995 (D/N)
Scorecard

South Africa; 215 (49.3 overs)	v	Pakistan; 178 (42.5 overs)
DJ Cullinan 64 (90); Waqar Younis 3/32 (9.3 overs)		Aamer Sohail 71 (74); EO Simons 4/42 (8 overs)

South Africa won by 37 runs
Newlands, Cape Town
Umpires: CJ Mitchley (SA) and DL Orchard (SA)
Player of the match: EO Simons (SA)

- Pakistan won the toss and elected to field.

==== 2nd Final ====
12 January 1995 (D/N)
Scorecard

South Africa; 266/5 (50 overs)	v	Pakistan; 109 (32.3 overs)
MJR Rindel 106 (139); Saleem Malik 1/24 (4 overs)		Wasim Akram 26 (42); PS de Villiers 3/21 (7 overs)

South Africa won by 157 runs
New Wanderers, Johannesburg
Umpires: KE Liebenberg (SA) and CJ Mitchley (SA)
Player of the match: MJR Rindel (SA)

- Pakistan won the toss and elected to field.

== Test series ==
=== Only Test ===
19–23 January 1995
Scorecard

South Africa	v	Pakistan
460 (120.2 overs); BM McMillan 113 (180); Aaqib Javed 3/102 (29.4 overs)		230 (65.5 overs); Saleem Malik 99 (154); PS de Villiers 6/81 (20.5 overs)
259/7d (80 overs); DJ Cullinan 69* (157); Wasim Akram 2/53 (23 overs)		165 (69.3 overs); Inzamam-ul-Haq 95 (179); PS de Villiers 4/27 (19.3 overs)

South Africa won by 324 runs
New Wanderers, Johannesburg
Umpires: MJ Kitchen (ENG) and CJ Mitchley (SA)
Player of the match: PS de Villiers (SA)

- South Africa won the toss and elected to bat.

==== Records ====
This match was the inaugural Test between Pakistan and South Africa. At the time, this was South Africa's second-largest Test victory by runs.

== See also ==
- New Zealand cricket team in South Africa in 1994–95
- Mandela Trophy
