= Dean Elgar =

South African cricketer (born 1987)

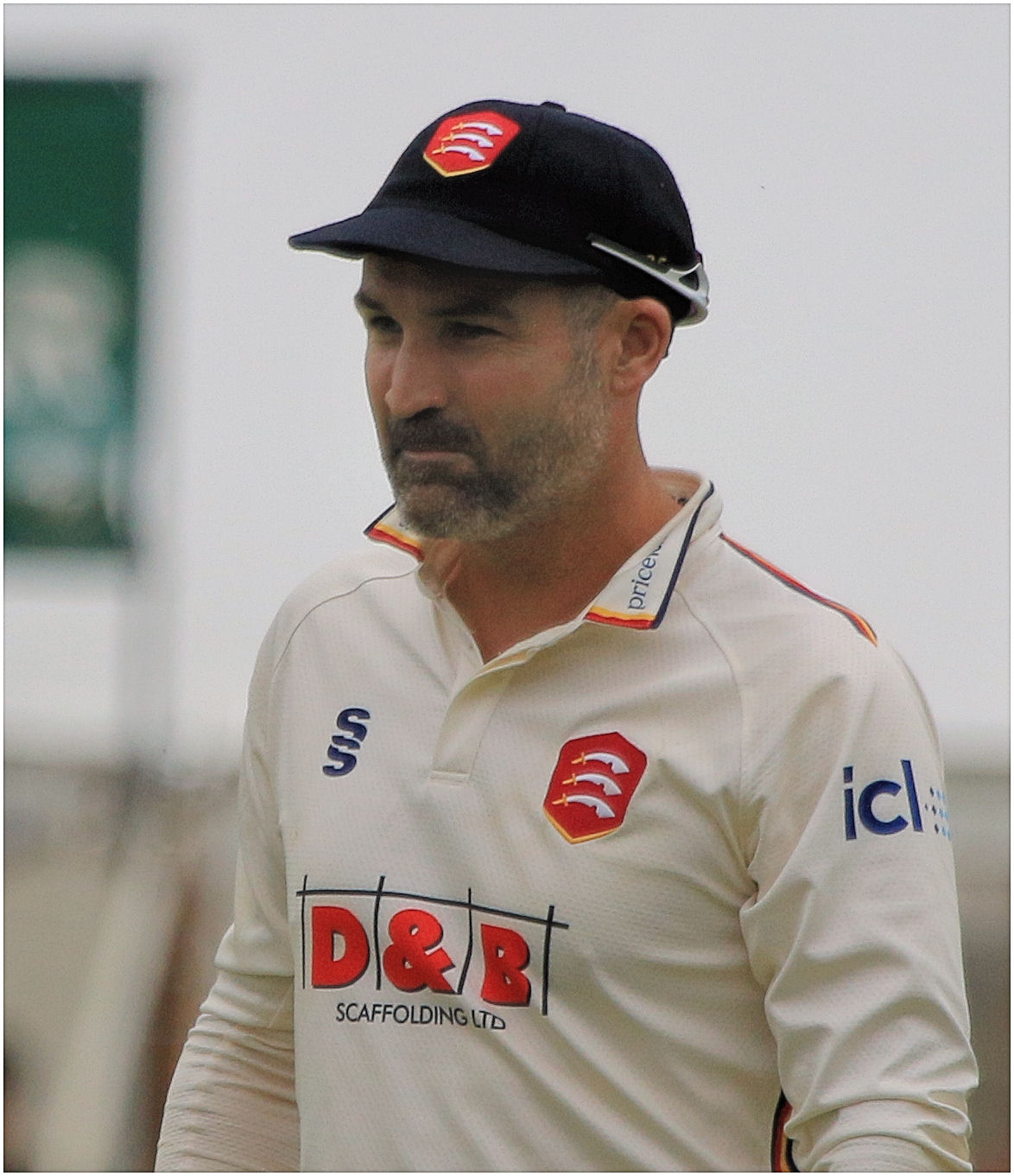
- Elgar in the 2025 County Championship

Personal information
- Full name: Dean Elgar
- Born: 11 June 1987 (age 39); Welkom, Free State, South Africa
- Height: 5 ft 8 in (1.73 m)
- Batting: Left-handed
- Bowling: Slow left-arm orthodox
- Role: Opening batter

International information
- National side: South Africa (2012–2024)
- Test debut (cap 315): 30 November 2012 v Australia
- Last Test: 3 January 2024 v India
- ODI debut (cap 104): 24 August 2012 v England
- Last ODI: 3 October 2018 v Zimbabwe
- ODI shirt no.: 64

Domestic team information
- Years: Team
- 2005/06–2011/12: Free State
- 2007/08–2013/14: Knights
- 2013, 2017: Somerset
- 2014/15–2023/24: Titans
- 2015, 2018–2019: Surrey
- 2018: Tshwane Spartans
- 2024–2026: Essex

Career statistics
Competition	Test	ODI	FC	LA
Matches	86	8	284	178
Runs scored	5,347	104	19,362	6,264
Batting average	37.65	17.33	41.90	43.59
100s/50s	14/23	0/0	57/77	10/45
Top score	199	42	268	137
Balls bowled	1,036	96	4,181	3,109
Wickets	15	2	56	57
Bowling average	44.86	33.50	50.23	49.87
5 wickets in innings	0	0	0	0
10 wickets in match	0	0	0	0
Best bowling	4/22	1/11	4/22	4/37
Catches/stumpings	92/–	4/–	234/–	54/–
- Source: ESPNcricinfo, 27 September 2026

Dean Elgar (born 11 June 1987) is a retired South African professional cricket left-handed opening batter. He represented South Africa from 2012 to 2024, scoring 5,347 career runs in Test matches, the eighth-highest of all time for the team. Elgar is the second batter to carry the bat on three occasions in Tests. He served as the regular Test captain for South Africa from 2021 until his international retirement in 2024.

== International career ==
=== Debut years ===
Elgar was selected for the Sri Lankan ODI series in early 2012 but had to withdraw citing injury. He eventually made his ODI debut against England in a rain-abandoned match, but found success in his second match, scoring 15 in his maiden innings before being bowled by Graeme Swann. Bowling his left-arm spin, Elgar had Craig Kieswetter caught out off only his third delivery in ODI Cricket. In the field, Elgar took an incredible catch of Jonathan Trott then caught Eoin Morgan out in a South African victory.

Elgar made his test debut against Australia on 30 November 2012 and scored a duck in his maiden test innings. He followed this with another duck in the second innings to complete a pair of ducks on debut. On 12 January 2013, Elgar scored his maiden test century against New Zealand. The retirement of Graeme Smith created a regular opportunity for Elgar in his specialist position at the top of the order in Test cricket.

Elgar made 103, against Sri Lanka on 16 July 2014, and followed up with 121 against West Indies at St George's Oval, a ground where he scored almost half of his career international test runs, and recorded the most fifties.

=== Record opener ===
On 28 December 2015, Elgar became the first South African opener to carry his bat in a Test innings since Gary Kirsten in 1997, when he finished 118 not out against England.

On 5 November 2016, Elgar scored 127 during the first Test against Australia at Perth. The partnership of 250 by himself and JP Duminy in the match was recorded as South Africa's highest partnership in Perth, the third highest overall in Perth, and their second highest against Australia.

On 11 March 2017, against New Zealand he became the first South African opener to face 200 or more balls in both innings of a Test.

On 27 January 2018, against India Elgar became the first South African to carry his bat twice in Tests since 1992.

On 23 March 2018, Elgar carried the bat for the third time in his test career scoring an unbeaten 141 against Australia when South Africa was bowled out for 311 in the first innings of the 3rd test, equalling the record with Desmond Haynes of West Indies. With this achievement, he also became the only batsman to carry his bat in an innings of a test match twice in a single calendar year.

=== Captaincy ===
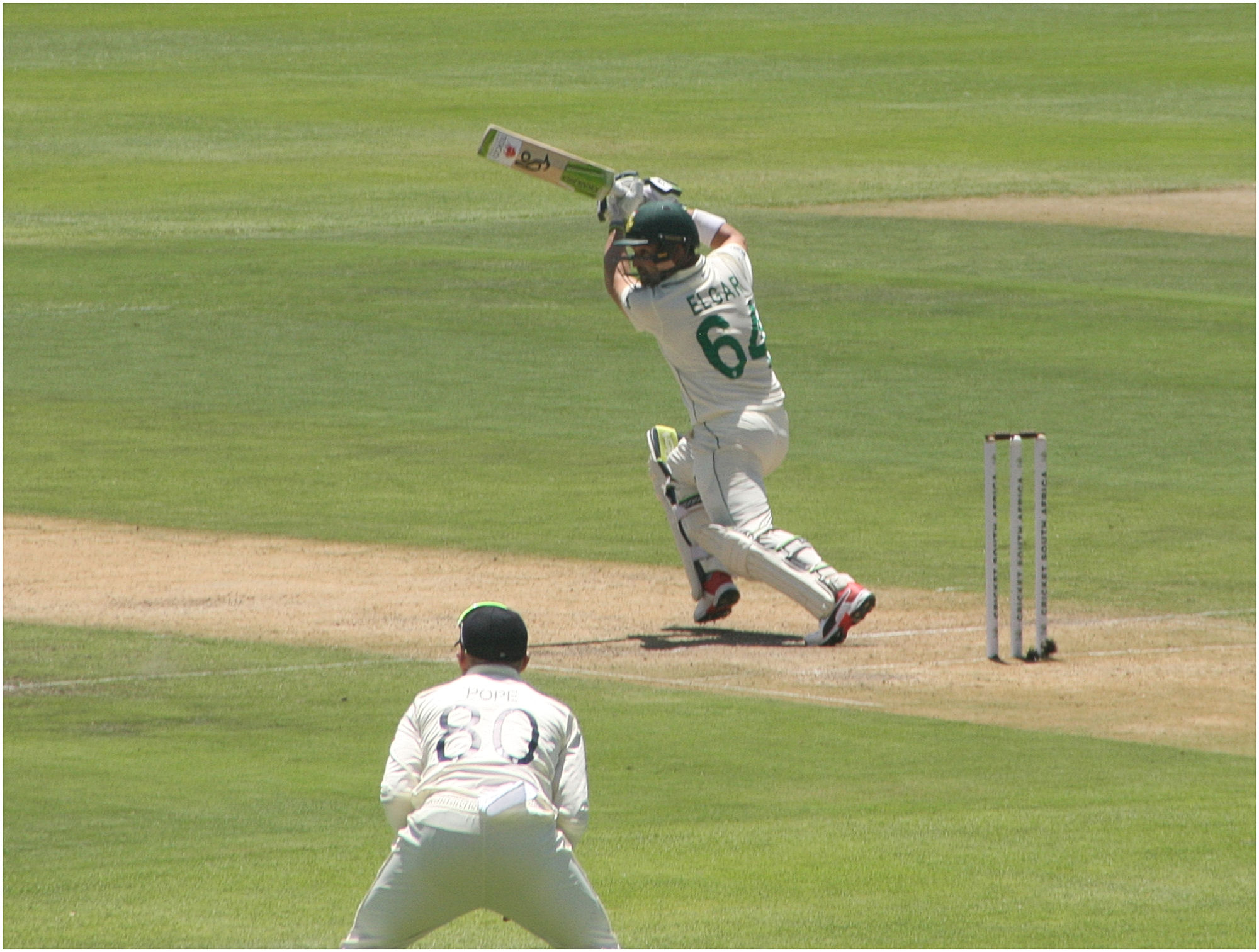
Elgar playing against England at Newlands Cricket Ground, January 2020

Elgar stood in for regular Test captain Faf du Plessis when he missed the first Test against England in 2017, following the birth of his first child. In January 2019, during Pakistan series, South Africa's captain Faf du Plessis was penalised for a slow over-rate in the second Test and was suspended for the third and final Test of the series. Elgar was named as the stand-in captain for the third Test. He took over as full-time test captain, following the resignation of Quinton de Kock from the position. His first test as captain came against the West Indies in June 2021. South Africa won this match by an innings and 63 runs and then won the following test by 158 runs, giving Elgar a 2–0 victory in his debut series as captain. In January 2022, during the 2021–22 Indian tour of South Africa Elgar scored an unbeaten 96 in the second test to guide South Africa to a seven wicket victory and draw the series level. On 3 January 2024, Elgar played his last test for South Africa against India, which concluded on 4 January, at Newlands in Cape Town, before retiring from international cricket.

== Domestic and franchise cricket ==
In September 2019, Elgar was named in the squad for the Tshwane Spartans team for the 2019 Mzansi Super League tournament. In April 2021, he was named in Northerns' squad, ahead of the 2021–22 cricket season in South Africa. In February 2022, Elgar was named as the captain of the Titans for the 2021–22 CSA T20 Challenge.

== List of international centuries ==
Elgar has scored 14 centuries (100 or more runs in a single innings) in Test. Elgar made his Test debut against Australis at the Waca, Perth in November 2012. His highest Test score of 199 came against Bangladesh at the Senwes Park, Potchefstroom in September 2018. He has not scored any century in One Day International (ODI) matches or Twenty20 International (T20I) matches.

Key
Symbol	Meaning
*	Remained not out
†	Man of the match
Match	Matches played
Pos.	Position in the batting order
Inn.	The innings of the match
Test	The number of the Test match played in that series
S/R	Strike rate during the innings
H/A/N	Venue was at home (South Africa), away or neutral
Date	Date the match was held, or the starting date of match for Test matches
Lost	The match was lost by South Africa
Won	The match was won by South Africa
Drawn	The match was drawn

List of Test centuries scored by Dean Elgar
No.	Score	Against	Pos.	Inn.	Test	Venue	H/A/N	Date	Result	Ref
1	103*	New Zealand	7	1	2/2	(South Africa) St George's Park, Port Elizabeth	Home	11 January 2013	Won	
2	103	Sri Lanka	1	1	1/2	(Sri Lanka) Galle International Stadium, Galle	Away	16 July 2014	Won	
3	121	West Indies	1	1	2/3	(South Africa) St George's Park Cricket Ground, Port Elizabeth	Home	26 December 2014	Drawn	
4	118*	England	2	2	1/4	(South Africa) Kingsmead Cricket Ground, Durban	Home	26 December 2016	Lost	
5	127	Australia	2	3	1/3	(Australia) The WACA, Perth	Away	3 November 2016	Won	
6	129	Sri Lanka	2	2	2/3	(South Africa) Newlands Cricket Ground, Cape Town	Home	2 January 2017	Won	
7	140 †	New Zealand	2	1	1/3	(New Zealand) University of Otago Oval, Dunedin	Away	8 March 2017	Drawn	
8	136	England	2	4	3/4	(England) The Oval, London	Away	27 July 2017	Lost	
9	199 †	Bangladesh	1	1	1/2	(South Africa) Senwes Park, Potchefstroom	Home	28 September 2017	Won	
10	113	Bangladesh	1	1	2/2	(South Africa) Mangaung Oval, Bloemfontein	Home	6 October 2017	Won	
11	141*	Australia	1	1	3/4	(South Africa) Newlands Cricket Ground, Cape Town	Home	22 March 2018	Won	
12	160	India	1	2	1/3	(India) VDCA Cricket Stadium, Vishakhapatnam	Away	2 October 2019	Lost	
13	127 †	Sri Lanka	1	2	2/2	(South Africa) New Wanderers Stadium, Johannesburg	Home	3 January 2021	Won	
14	185 †	India	2	2	1/2	(South Africa) SuperSport Park, Centurion	Home	26 December 2023	Won	

== See also ==
- List of cricketers who have carried the bat in international cricket
