= Pat Symcox =

South African cricketer (born 1960)

Personal information
- Full name: Patrick Leonard Symcox
- Born: 14 April 1960 (age 66); Kimberley, Northern Cape Province, South Africa
- Batting: Right-handed
- Bowling: Right-arm offbreak

International information
- National side: South Africa (1993–1999)
- Test debut (cap 255): 25 August 1993 v Sri Lanka
- Last Test: 26 December 1998 v West Indies
- ODI debut (cap 27): 22 August 1993 v Sri Lanka
- Last ODI: 20 February 1999 v New Zealand

Domestic team information
- Years: Team
- 1977/78–1982/83: Griqualand West
- 1983/84–1987/88: Northern Transvaal
- 1988/89–1989/90: Griqualand West
- 1989/90: Impalas
- 1990/92–1996/97: Natal
- 1998/99–1999/00: Griqualand West

Career statistics
Competition	Test	ODI
Matches	20	80
Runs scored	741	694
Batting average	28.50	16.92
100s/50s	1/4	0/3
Top score	108	61
Balls bowled	3,561	3,991
Wickets	37	72
Bowling average	43.32	38.36
5 wickets in innings	0	0
10 wickets in match	0	0
Best bowling	4/69	4/28
Catches/stumpings	5/–	23/–
- Source: Cricinfo, 25 January 2006

Patrick Leonard Symcox (born 14 April 1960) is a former South African international cricketer. He played 20 Test matches and 80 One Day Internationals in the 1990s. Symcox was a member of the South Africa team that won the 1998 ICC KnockOut Trophy.

== International career ==
Symcox was a right-arm off-spin bowler and was known for his powerful hitting down the order and has a Test century to his name, scored against Pakistan. Symcox is co-holder of the highest ever ninth-wicket partnership of 195 runs. Symcox retired in 1998. His son, Russel, like his father, used to play provincial cricket for the Natal Dolphins. His father Rodger, also played provincial cricket for Griqualand West and the Symcox family are one of ten families in South Africa to have seen three generations play first-class cricket.

During an ODI against Australia at the SCG in late-1997, play was stopped after the crowd pelted Symcox with projectiles, including an entire chicken.

== After cricket ==
He has commentated for Supersport and ESPN Star Sports on cricket around the world.

Symcox now owns the REMAX property franchise on the South Coast of Kwa-Zulu Natal in South Africa known as RE/MAX Coast & Country which is active in the residential and commercial property sector.

He is also a popular after-dinner speaker and plays golf off a single figure handicap. Known as one of the tough men of the 90's Protea cricket team, he played under Kepler Wessels and Hansie Cronje. Prior to his cricketing career, Symcox also managed private hospitals and worked for Masters International acting as a managing agent for many of the top sportsmen of South Africa.

In his spare time his hobbies include angling.
