= Prest (surname) =

Prest is a surname. Notable people with the surname include:

- Agnes Prest (died 1557), English Protestant martyr
- Arthur Prest (1906–1976), Nigerian politician
- Bill Prest (1926–2012), Australian politician from Queensland
- Cedar Prest (born 1940), Australian stained glass artist
- Charles Prest (1841–1875), English cricketer
- Edward Prest (1830–1903), English lawyer and cricketer
- Edward Prest (priest) (1824–1882), English Anglican priest
- Gregory Prest, Canadian actor, playwright and theatre director
- Harold Prest (1890–1955), English cricketer
- Helen Prest-Ajayi (born 1959), Nigerian lawyer and writer
- John Prest (1928–2018), British historian
- John Prest (cricketer) (1826–1871), English cricketer
- Martín Prest (born 1978), Argentine footballer
- Sid Prest (1943–2015), Canadian politician
- Steve Prest (1966–2009), English snooker player and coach
- Thomas Peckett Prest (1810–1859), British writer, journalist and musician
- Tom Prest (born 2003), English cricketer
- Tommy Prest (1908–1987), English footballer
- Trefor Prest (born 1945), Welsh-Australian sculptor
- Warren Prest (1932–2008), Australian rules footballer and coach
- Wilfrid Prest (born 1940), Australian legal historian and academic
- William Prest (1832–1885), English cricketer and footballer
- William Prest (Cambridgeshire cricketer) (1832–1877), English cricketer

== See also ==
- Prest (disambiguation)
- Prest family
