= 1999 Cricket World Cup final =

1999 ICC Cricket World Cup Final
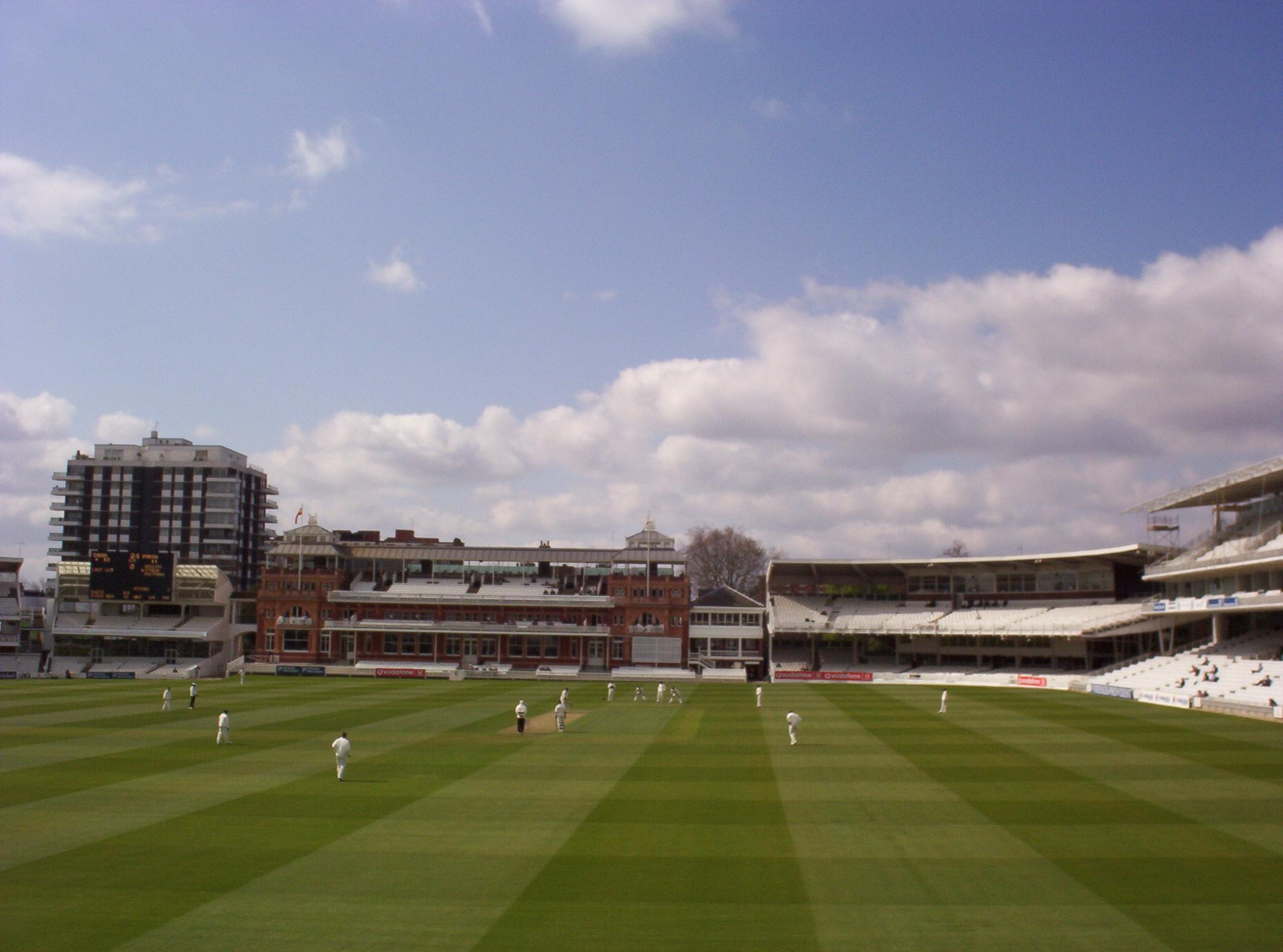
- Event: 1999 ICC Cricket World Cup
Pakistan	Australia
(Pakistan)	(Australia)
132	133/2
39 overs	20.1 overs
- Australia won by 8 wickets
- Date: 20 June 1999
- Venue: Lord's Cricket Ground, London
- Player of the match: Shane Warne (Aus)
- Umpires: Steve Bucknor (WI) and David Shepherd (Eng)
- Attendance: 30,040

The 1999 Cricket World Cup final was played at Lord's in London on 20 June 1999 to determine the winner of the seventh installment of the ICC Cricket World Cup. This was the fourth time Lord's had hosted the final of an ICC Cricket World Cup, previously hosting finals in 1975, 1979 and 1983. Australia won their second title by defeating Pakistan by 8 wickets in the final, in a lacklustre game heavily overshadowed by the dramatic tied semi-final between Australia and South Africa. Shane Warne was declared Man of the Match for taking 4 wickets.

== Background ==
Australia and Pakistan had never previously faced each other in a major tournament final. Australia were former winners of the World Cup in 1987 while Pakistan were former winners of 1992 edition.

== Road to final ==
Pakistan

Pakistan had finished top of Pool B ahead of Australia who were in the same pool. They started their world cup campaign with a victory over West Indies and Scotland. Later, they defeated tournament favourites Australia and then New Zealand. This allowed them to qualify for the super-six stage despite losing to Bangladesh in a shocker. In the super six stage, they lost their second consecutive match to South Africa. Then they lost to their arch-rivals India leading to their third consecutive defeat. However, in their last super-six match they easily defeated Zimbabwe and became the first team to qualify for the semi-finals. In the semi-finals they easily defeated New Zealand by 9 wickets to qualify for their second world cup final after 1992.

Australia

Regarded as the tournament favourites, Australia started their tournament campaign with a victory over Scotland. However, the momentum completely changed as they lost two consecutive matches to New Zealand and Pakistan. Later, with timely changes they defeated Bangladesh and West Indies and ranked second in Pool B and qualified for the next round. In the super six stage, they made a sensational comeback by defeating India, Zimbabwe and South Africa and qualified for the semi-finals. In the semi-finals they faced South Africa again but this time the match ended in one of the most dramatic matches ever as it was a tie between both teams, however Australia qualified for the finals as they finished above South Africa based on the run-rate in the Super Sixes. Thus, Australia qualified for their third world cup final after 1975 and 1987.

== Details ==
=== Match officials ===
- On-field umpires: Steve Bucknor (WI) and David Shepherd (Eng)
- Third umpire: Srinivasaraghavan Venkataraghavan (Ind)
- Match referee: Ranjan Madugalle (SL)

=== Summary ===
Pakistan's captain Wasim Akram won the toss and elected to bat. Pakistan made a slow and shaky start as they lost their openers early. Razzaq tried to stabilize the innings but was dismissed in the 20th over as Pakistan were 68 off 3. Later, as Warne came to bowl this proved to be the turning point of the match as Pakistan lost wickets at regular intervals and the middle order collapsed completely as Ijaz Ahmed, Inzamam, Moin Khan and others got out cheaply and eventually they got bowled out at 132 runs, thanks to a fine bowling display by Shane Warne, Glenn McGrath, Tom Moody and others. In response, Australia made a quick start to the chase as Adam Gilchrist made a quick 54 runs off 36 balls. As Australia were 112 off 2, Mark Waugh and Lehmann stabilized the innings and in the end, the winning boundary by Lehmann ensured victory to Australia as they won the match after 20.1 overs, losing just two wickets. Shane Warne was later awarded with the man of the match award for taking four crucial wickets and Australia lifted their second World Cup after 1987.

20 June 1999
Scorecard

Pakistan; 132 (39 overs)	v	Australia; 133/2 (20.1 overs)
Ijaz Ahmed 22 (46); Shane Warne 4/33 (9 overs)		Adam Gilchrist 54 (36); Saqlain Mushtaq 1/21 (4.1 overs)

Australia win by 8 wickets
Lord's, London
Attendance: 30,040
Umpires: Steve Bucknor (WI) and David Shepherd (Eng)
Player of the match: Shane Warne (Aus)

- Pakistan won the toss and elected to bat.

== Scorecard ==
Pakistan batting
Player	Status	Runs	Balls	4s	6s	Strike rate
Saeed Anwar	b Fleming	15	17	3	0	88.23
Wajahatullah Wasti	c ME Waugh b McGrath	1	14	0	0	7.14
Abdul Razzaq	c SR Waugh b Moody	17	51	2	0	33.33
Ijaz Ahmed	b Warne	22	46	2	0	47.82
Inzamam-ul-Haq	c †Gilchrist b Reiffel	15	33	0	0	45.45
Moin Khan †	c †Gilchrist b Warne	6	12	0	0	50.00
Shahid Afridi	lbw b Warne	13	16	2	0	81.85
Azhar Mahmood	c & b Moody	8	17	1	0	47.05
Wasim Akram*	c SR Waugh b Warne	8	20	0	1	40.00
Saqlain Mushtaq	c Ponting b McGrath	0	4	0	0	0.00
Shoaib Akhtar	not out	2	6	0	0	33.33
Extras	(lb 10, nb 2, w 13)	25				
Total	(all out in 39 overs)	132		10	1	

Fall of wickets: 1-21 (Wasti, 4.4 ov), 2-21 (Anwar, 5.1 ov), 3-68 (Razzaq, 19.4 ov), 4-77 (Ijaz, 23.4 ov), 5-91 (Moin, 27.1 ov), 6-104 (Inzamam, 30.1 ov), 7-113 (Afridi, 31.6 ov), 8-129 (Mahmood, 36.6 ov), 9-129 (Akram, 37.2 ov), 10-132 (Saqlain, 38.6 ov)

Australia bowling
Bowler	Overs	Maidens	Runs	Wickets	Econ	Wides	NBs
Glenn McGrath	9	3	13	2	1.44	0	0
Damien Fleming	6	0	30	1	5.00	4	2
Paul Reiffel	10	1	29	1	2.90	2	0
Tom Moody	5	0	17	2	3.40	1	0
Shane Warne	9	1	33	4	3.66	2	0

Australia batting
Player	Status	Runs	Balls	4s	6s	Strike rate
Mark Waugh	not out	37	52	4	0	71.15
Adam Gilchrist †	c Inzamam b Saqlain	54	36	8	1	150.00
Ricky Ponting	c †Moin b Akram	24	27	3	0	88.88
Darren Lehmann	not out	13	9	2	0	144.44
Steve Waugh*						
Michael Bevan						
Tom Moody						
Shane Warne						
Paul Reiffel						
Damien Fleming						
Glenn McGrath						
Extras	(lb 1, w 3, nb 1)	5				
Total	(2 wickets; 20.1 overs)	133		17	1	

Fall of wickets: 1-75 (Gilchrist, 10.1 ov), 2-112 (Ponting, 17.4 ov)

Pakistan bowling
Bowler	Overs	Maidens	Runs	Wickets	Econ	Wides	NBs
Wasim Akram	8	1	41	1	5.12	0	0
Shoaib Akhtar	4	0	37	0	9.25	4	2
Abdul Razzaq	2	0	13	0	6.50	2	0
Azhar Mahmood	2	0	20	0	10.00	1	0
Saqlain Mushtaq	4.1	0	21	1	5.04	2	0
