= Cricket World Cup awards =

Overview of awards presented as part of the Cricket World Cup

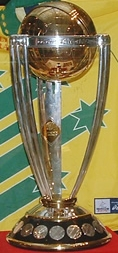
The Cricket World Cup Trophy.

At the end of each ICC Cricket World Cup final tournament, several awards are presented to the players and teams which have distinguished themselves in various aspects of the game.

== Awards summary ==
There are currently four post-tournament awards:

- the Golden Bat Award (currently termed "ICC Golden Bat") for top run scorer, first awarded in 1975;
- the Golden Ball Award (currently termed "ICC Golden Ball") for top wicket getter, first awarded in 1975;
- the Player of the tournament Award (currently termed "ICC Player of the tournament") for outstanding performance in the entire World Cup tournament, first awarded in 1992;
- the Player of the match in Final Award (currently termed "ICC Player of the match in Final") for outstanding player in World Cup finals, first awarded in 1975;

== Player of the tournament ==
Year	Player	Stats
1992	(New Zealand) Martin Crowe	456 runs
1996	(Sri Lanka) Sanath Jayasuriya	221 runs & 6 wickets
1999	(South Africa) Lance Klusener	281 runs & 17 wickets
2003	(India) Sachin Tendulkar	673 runs & 2 wickets
2007	(Australia) Glenn McGrath	26 wickets
2011	(India) Yuvraj Singh	362 runs & 15 wickets
2015	(Australia) Mitchell Starc	22 wickets
2019	(New Zealand) Kane Williamson	578 runs
2023	(India) Virat Kohli	765 runs & 1 wicket

== Player of the match in Final ==
Year	Player	Stats
1975	(Cricket West Indies) Clive Lloyd	102
1979	(Cricket West Indies) Viv Richards	138*
1983	(India) Mohinder Amarnath	26 and 3/12
1987	(Australia) David Boon	75
1992	(Pakistan) Wasim Akram	33* and 3/49
1996	(Sri Lanka) Aravinda de Silva	3/42 and 107*
1999	(Australia) Shane Warne	4/33
2003	(Australia) Ricky Ponting	140*
2007	(Australia) Adam Gilchrist	149
2011	(India) MS Dhoni	91*
2015	(Australia) James Faulkner	3/36
2019	(England) Ben Stokes	84*
2023	(Australia) Travis Head	137
2027		
2031		

== Golden Bat ==
The Golden Bat Award goes to the top run scorer of the ICC World Cup. While every World Cup had a ranking of the run scorers, the first time an award was given was in 1975. If there is more than one player with the same number of runs both of them are awarded with the Golden Bat. India is the only country whose players have won the Golden Bat a record 5 times (Sachin Tendulkar in 1996 & 2003, Rahul Dravid in 1999, Rohit Sharma in 2019 and Virat Kohli in 2023).

Top runscorer
World Cup	Winner	Runs
1975	(New Zealand) Glenn Turner	333
1979	(Cricket West Indies) Gordon Greenidge	253
1983	(England) David Gower	384
1987	(England) Graham Gooch	471
1992	(New Zealand) Martin Crowe	456
1996	(India) Sachin Tendulkar	523
1999	(India) Rahul Dravid	461
2003	(India) Sachin Tendulkar	673
2007	(Australia) Matthew Hayden	659
2011	(Sri Lanka) Tillakaratne Dilshan	500
2015	(New Zealand) Martin Guptill	547
2019	(India) Rohit Sharma	648
2023	(India) Virat Kohli	765
2027		
2031		

== Golden Ball ==
The Golden Ball Award goes to the top wicket taker of the ICC World Cup. While every World Cup had a ranking of the wicket takers, the first time an award was given was in 1975.

If there is more than one player with the same number of wickets both of them are awarded with the Golden Ball.

Top wicket taker
World Cup	Winner	Wickets
1975	(Australia) Gary Gilmour	11
1979	(England) Mike Hendrick	10
1983	(India) Roger Binny	18
1987	(Australia) Craig McDermott	18
1992	(Pakistan) Wasim Akram	18
1996	(India) Anil Kumble	15
1999	(New Zealand) Geoff Allott (Australia) Shane Warne	20; 20
2003	(Sri Lanka) Chaminda Vaas	23
2007	(Australia) Glenn McGrath	26
2011	(Pakistan) Shahid Afridi (India) Zaheer Khan	21; 21
2015	(Australia) Mitchell Starc (New Zealand) Trent Boult	22; 22
2019	(Australia) Mitchell Starc	27
2023	(India) Mohammed Shami	24
2027		
2031		

== See also ==
- Cricket World Cup records
- History of the Cricket World Cup
