= Day/night cricket in England =

Cricket played under floodlights

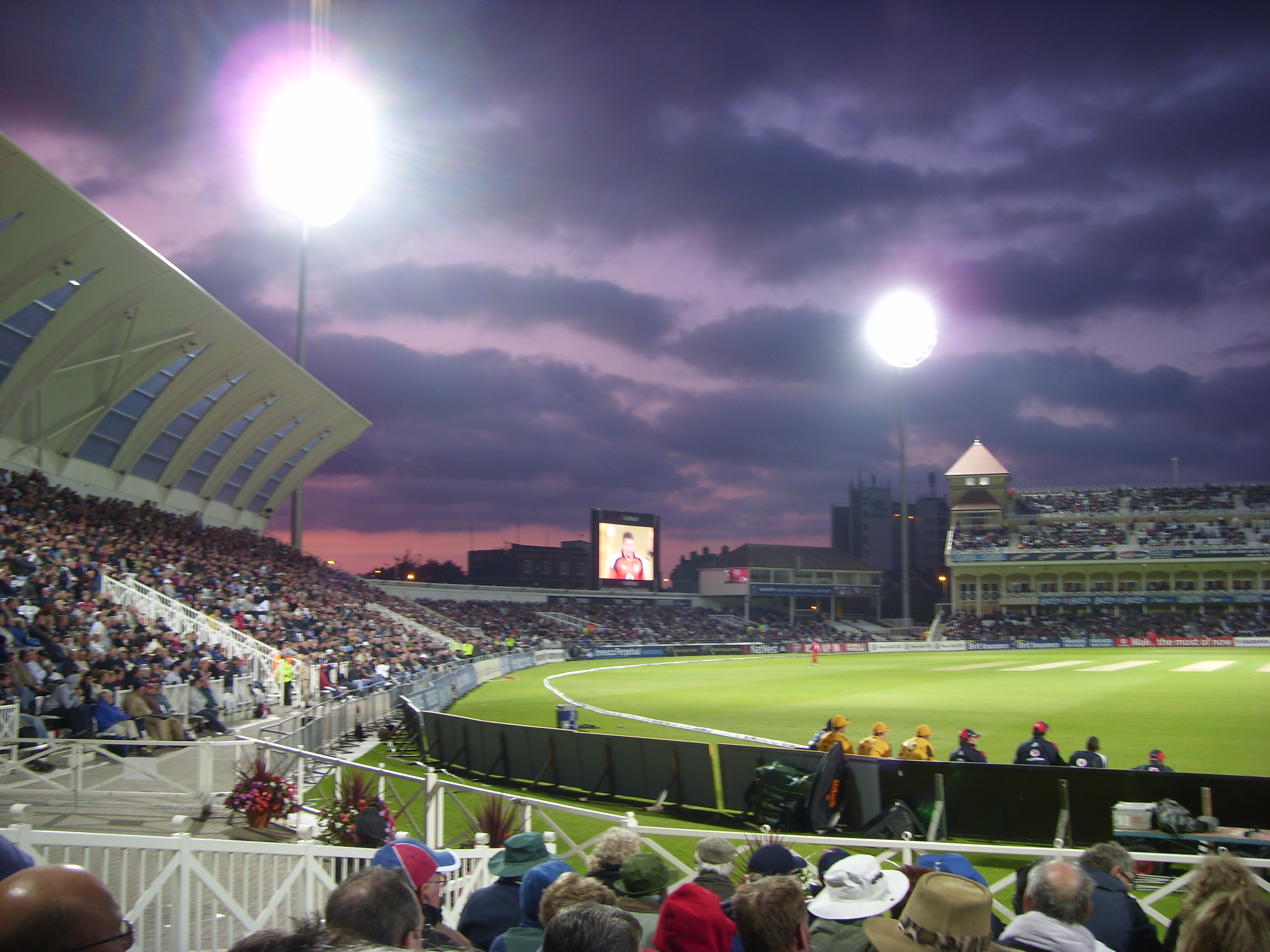
Day/night match at Trent Bridge

Floodlit (day/night) Cricket is cricket played under floodlights at night. The use of floodlights in cricket matches has helped to bring much investment into the game both at a national and an international level since it began in 1977. Today floodlit (day/night) cricket is played in most of the test playing nations although some nations only started hosting day/night matches in the last 10 to 14 years.

== Beginnings of floodlit cricket ==
Floodlit cricket began in Australia when Kerry Packer organised the World Series Cricket competition in the late 1970s for his television company Nine Network. On 28 November 1978 the very first day/night match was played at Adelaide between WSC Australia and the WSC West Indies, a match in which the WSC Australia won by five wickets batting under the floodlights. Very quickly day/night cricket went from strength to strength and even when the WSC ended in 1979 Australia started playing official ODI's under floodlights. The first official floodlit match took place less than one year after the WSC event with Australia again beating the West Indies by five wickets. By 1985 most ODI's in Australia were being played under lights at night.

== Day/night cricket in England and Wales 1997–1999 ==
Day/night cricket has been played in England and Wales since July 1997. Since then it has become a major part in the English cricket season with day/night matches played in the NatWest Pro40 League (40 overs), the main competition in which day/night cricket was played alongside day matches but also floodlit matches are played in the Twenty20 Cup (20 overs) and in the Friends Provident Trophy (50 overs) although only grounds which have paramount floodlights and the final of the Twenty20 Cup are day/night matches staged in these competitions. Also England have hosted day/night ODI's (50 overs) at various grounds around England and Wales every season since 2000.

Day/night cricket in England and Wales started in 1997 when three counties Surrey, Sussex and Warwickshire took the brave step of deciding to each stage one home fixture from the than known AXA Life Sunday League using temporary floodlights. The first official day/night match was due to take place at the Oval on 26 June 1997 between Surrey and Nottinghamshire; however, the match was abandoned due to heavy rain without a ball bowled and so the honour of staging the first day/night cricket match in England and Wales then fell to Edgbaston, which on 23 July 1997 successfully staged a match between Warwickshire and Somerset in front of 16,000 people, a match which Warwickshire won. Sussex successfully staged their first day/night match a month later at Hove against Surrey, a match which Surrey won by 5 wickets in front of a crowd of 4,000 people.

In 1998 after the success of the previous season seven counties Gloucestershire, Lancashire, Nottinghamshire, Surrey, Sussex, Warwickshire and Yorkshire staged day/night matches with a total of 11 played (up 8 on 1997) under lights, with Warwickshire making the decision of playing four home matches under lights and Lancashire staging two home matches at Old Trafford. Trent Bridge, Bristol, Hove, Headingley and The Oval staged one match each. By the 1999 season it became official that day/night cricket was here to stay when Sussex became the first county to install paramount floodlights at their county ground in Hove. Also the advent of the new formed 2 division National League allowed for day/night matches to become a major part of the competition. In 1999 more counties came into line with eleven counties staging games including for the first time Durham, Leicestershire, Somerset and Worcestershire. A total of 20 day/night matches were played, up 9 on 1998.

Despite the success of it no day/night matches were staged during the 1999 Cricket World Cup.

== Day/night cricket in England and Wales 2000–2005 ==
By 2000 day/night cricket had become commonplace on the County Cricket scene. In 2000 the First One Day International day/night match in England was played under lights at Bristol and also the England Under 19 team also hosted its first day/night match a few weeks later at Hove. Also Derbyshire, Glamorgan and Northamptonshire staged their first home matches under lights. In 2001 Hampshire and Kent staged their first home day/night matches as did Essex however their first floodlit match was staged at Colchester which as of 2008 is the only out ground in England and Wales to have staged official day/night matches. By 2002 all but one (Middlesex) of the first class counties had staged a National League game under lights at their county grounds.

Between 1997 and 2002 day/night cricket between the First Class Counties was only played in the Sunday/National League however in the 2003 season day/night cricket in England and Wales took its next major turn. In May of that year Essex became the second county to install paramount floodlights at their ground in Chelmsford who until than had staged all of their floodlit matches at Colchester. In June 2003 the Twenty20 Cup kicked off with Essex and Sussex deciding to each play 2 of their home matches under their lights. No other counties staged group matches under lights. This was the first time that day/night cricket in England had been played between any two counties outside of the National League and on 19 July 2003 at Trent Bridge in Nottingham Surrey Lions won not only the Twenty20 Cup for the first time but also won the very first domestic cup final to be played under floodlights. In 2004 Derbyshire became the third County to install paramount floodlights at their ground in Derby and also the number of day/night games in the Twenty20 Cup in that year increased to 6 matches, up 1 from 2003. Once again apart from the final and the three counties who owned paramount floodlights at that time no other county staged matches under lights. In 2005 the Twenty20 Cup expended from 51 to 79 matches and this caused another increase in the number of day/night games from six matches to ten. Helped in part by Glamorgan who in the same year became the fourth county to install paramount floodlights at their county ground in Cardiff, once again in 2005 day/night matches in the Twenty20 Cup were limited to the final and the four counties that owned paramount floodlights.

== Day/night cricket in England and Wales 2006– ==
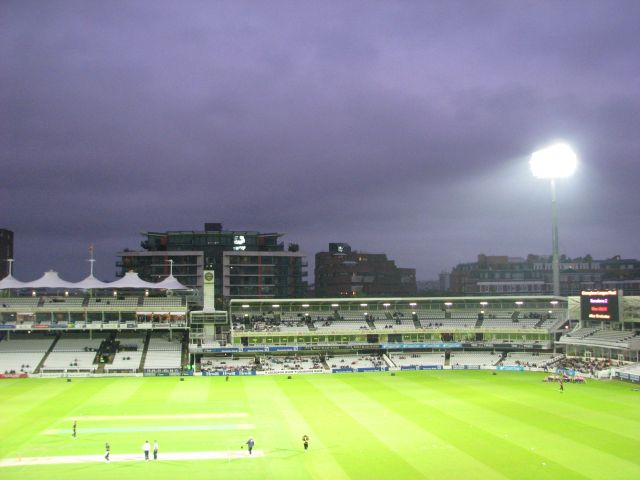
Twenty20 match at Lord's Middlesex vs Kent 27 May 2009

In 2006 One Day Cricket in England was given a major revamp by the ECB. This led to quite a few changes for day/night cricket in England. For the first time day/night matches were played in the C&G Trophy although as in the Twenty20 Cup matches were limited to the counties who owned paramount floodlights who were joined by Hampshire in becoming the fifth county to install paramount floodlights at the Rose Bowl. Also 2006 saw the launch of the NatWest Pro40 League which replaced the National League however under the new format the counties only played other once in their divisions as opposed to home and away. This meant that the number of day/night matches played in the competition was reduced because the counties had fewer home matches to play with. The story stayed the same for 2007 but for one thing. On 10 September 2007, ten years after the first day/night matches were played in England Lord's finally got to stage its first game under floodlights with a match between Middlesex and Derbyshire, a match which Middlesex won by 4 wickets.

In the 2008 Season a total of 55 cricket matches were played under floodlights in England and Wales, seven in the Friends Provident Trophy, nineteen in the Twenty20 Cup, twenty three in the NatWest Pro40 League and two in the Twenty20 Floodlit Cup. Also England played three One Day Internationals under lights at Cardiff, Headingley and at Trent Bridge which also became the sixth ground in England and Wales to have paramount floodlights. The England Under 19 Team played one match under lights at Hove and Lord's staged its second floodlit match in August.

In 2011, Kent hosted the first competitive County Championship match to be played under floodlights at their St Lawrence Ground in Canterbury against Glamorgan.

== ODI day/night cricket in England and Wales ==
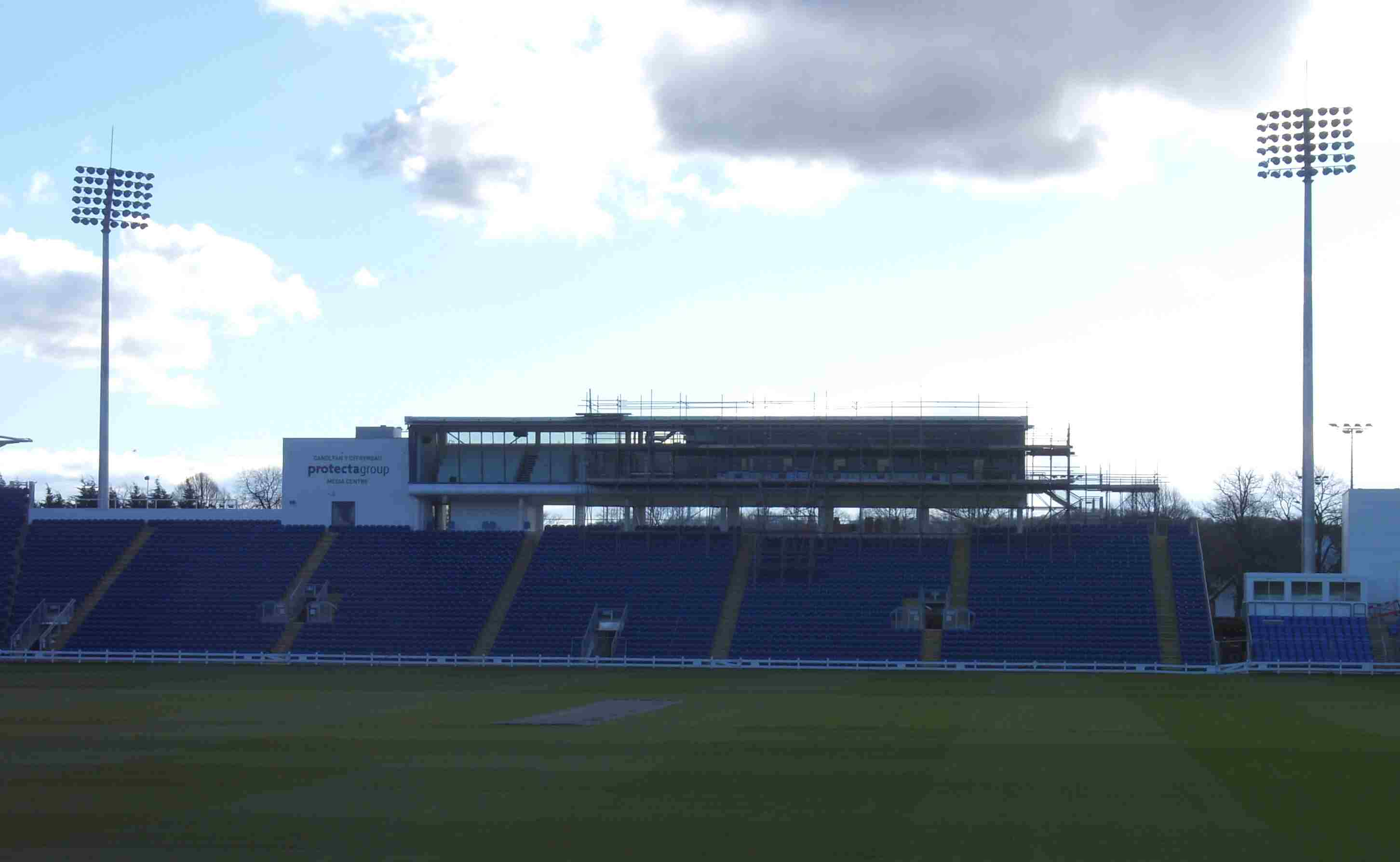
Floodlights in SWALEC Stadium

One Day International day/night cricket has been played in England since 2000 however its development in England and Wales has been very limited because until 2005 none of England's One Day Grounds had paramount floodlights and so temporary lights had to be used. The very first One Day International to be played under floodlights in England was on 6 July 2000 between Zimbabwe and the West Indies in front of 7,000 people at Gloucestershire's County Ground at Bristol, a match which the Zimbabwe won by six wickets. England played their home match under lights a week later at Trent Bridge, a match in which they romped to victory against Zimbabwe and the match was over at 7.30 pm and the lights were barely needed. In 2006 Glamorgan's County Ground in Cardiff staged the first ODI day/night match to be played in Wales and also became the first ODI in England and Wales to be played under paramount floodlights. Since 2000 there has never been more than three ODI's played under lights in England and Wales in the same year however in 2009 England will host four day/night ODI's against Australia which marks the first increase in the number of ODI's to be played in England under floodlights due to Trent Bridge installing paramount floodlights. As of May 2008 only two of England one day grounds have paramount floodlights, the Rose Bowl and Cardiff however Trent Bridge will become the third in August 2008 and when day/night matches are held away from these grounds temporary lights have to be used.

In the 2008 Season England will play three One Day Internationals under lights at home against South Africa at Cardiff and Headingley and Trent Bridge.

In the following is a list of the Grounds in England and Wales that have staged day/night ODI's since 2000

Official name (known as)	City	County side	Capacity	Ends
County Ground, Old Trafford (Old Trafford)	Manchester	Lancashire	22,000	• Stretford End • Brian Statham End
Trent Bridge Ground (Trent Bridge)	Nottingham	Nottinghamshire	15,350	• Pavilion End • Radcliffe Road End
County Cricket Ground (Headingley Carnegie)	Leeds	Yorkshire	17,000	• Kirkstall Lane End • Football Stand End
County Cricket Ground (Edgbaston)	Birmingham	Warwickshire	21,000	• City End • Pavilion End
County Ground (Riverside)	Chester-le-Street	Durham	17,000	• Finchale End • Lumley End
SWALEC Stadium	Cardiff	Glamorgan	16,500	• River Taff End • Cathedral Road End
County Cricket Ground (Nevil Road)	Bristol	Gloucestershire	7,000 (15,000)	• Pavilion End • Ashley Down Rd End

== Grounds and floodlights ==
As of 2008 only a third of the eighteen first-class counties in the whole of England and Wales have Paramount Floodlights at their home grounds. Because of this the other counties have to use temporary floodlights which are brought in by road when they stage their floodlit matches at home and because of this (as well as the cost) most, especially the smaller counties only host one floodlit match per year in the NatWest Pro40 League and apart from their home Twenty20 Cup matches it is often seen as the main event of the cricketing season at their grounds with higher than average attendances often recorded depending that the weather is fair.

In August 2008 Nottinghamshire will become the sixth county in England and Wales to use paramount floodlights at their county ground which for the first time will be used in an ODI between England and South Africa.

In the following is a list of the County Grounds which have paramount floodlights along with the year in which they were installed.

Official name (known as)	City or town	County side	Capacity	Ends	Floodlights First Used
County Cricket Ground	Hove	Sussex	4,000	• Cromwell Road End • Sea End	1999
County Cricket Ground	Chelmsford	Essex	6,000	• River End • Hayes Close End	2003
County Cricket Ground (Racecourse Ground)	Derby	Derbyshire	9,500	• Grandstand End • Scoreboard End	2004
SWALEC Stadium	Cardiff	Glamorgan	16,000	• River Taff End • Cathedral Road End	2005
Rose Bowl	Southampton	Hampshire	9,000 (22,000)	• Pavilion End • Northern End	2006
Trent Bridge Ground (Trent Bridge)	Nottingham	Nottinghamshire	15,350	• Pavilion End • Radcliffe Road End	2008
Lord's	London	Middlesex	30,000	• Pavilion End • Nursery End	2009
The Oval	London	Surrey	23,500	• Pavilion End • Vauxhall End	2009
Old Trafford Cricket Ground	Manchester	Lancashire	22,000	• Stretford End • Brian Statham End	2011
Edgbaston Cricket Ground	Birmingham	Warwickshire	25,000	• New Pavilion End • City End	2011
St Lawrence Ground	Canterbury	Kent	15,000	• Pavilion End • Nackington Road End	2011
County Cricket Ground	Taunton	Somerset	12,500	• Marcus Trescothick Pavilion End • The River End	2019

Over the winter in preparation for the 2009 Cricket Season both Lord's and The Oval also had permanent floodlights installed. Both these grounds have telescopic floodlights which can move upwards when required to light up the playing surface. Northamptonshire also installed permanent floodlights at their Wantage Road ground for the 2010 season. This took the total number of counties to have floodlights at their grounds to nine, exactly half of the 18 counties. Kent also installed permanent telescopic floodlights at their Canterbury ground in time for the 2011 cricket season. Durham and Yorkshire installed lights at the Riverside and Headingley for the 2015 season Both Leicestershire at their Grace Road ground and Gloucestershire at their Nevil Road ground installed floodlights in time for the 2016 season. Both grounds used the lights for the first time for matches in the T20 Blast competition on Friday 20 May 2016. With Somerset also having received planning permission for floodlights to be installed at their Taunton ground this only leaves Worcestershire as the only county not to have permanent floodlights at their home ground.

== England v West Indies (First day/night Test Match) ==
On 17 August 2017 Edgbaston played host to the first ever day/night Test match in England and only the fifth to be played worldwide between England and the West Indies with the just the first out of the three planned test matches being played under the lights using the pink ball. Play started at 14:00 BST with the scheduled close of play at 21:00 BST.

=== 1st Test ===
17–21 August 2017 (D/N)
Scorecard

England	v	West Indies

Edgbaston, Birmingham
Umpires: Marais Erasmus (SA) and Sundaram Ravi (Ind)

- England won the toss and elected to bat.
- Mark Stoneman (Eng) made his Test debut.
- This was the first day/night Test match in England.

All Timings are BST

Match Timings
1st session: 2.00pm – 4.00pm, Lunch: 4.00pm – 4.40pm, 2nd session: 4.40pm – 6.40pm, Tea: 6.40pm – 7.00pm, 3rd session: 7.00pm – 9.00pm.

== Day/night match timings ==
Over the years, match timings for day/night games in both the Sunday/National League and the Twenty20 Cup have changed. In July 1997 in the very first day/night match at Edgbaston play did not start on that night until 6.10 pm with play not finishing until 11.38 pm which brought about complaints from locals. These days matches apart from the Twenty20 Cup start in the mid-to-late Afternoon at either 2.30 pm for Friends Provident Trophy and One Day International matches with Pro40 matches starting a bit later at 4.40 pm with matches finishing at around 10.15 pm to 10.20 pm. Day/night Twenty20 Cup match start and finish times have also changed over the last few years. In 2003, matches started at 7.30 pm and finished at 10.15 pm. In 2006, timings were brought forward with the matches starting at 7 pm with the match finishing at 9.45 pm.

Here are the match timings for the 2008 Season.

All timings are BST

NatWest Pro40 League (40 overs)
1st Innings: 4.40pm – 7.20pm, Interval: 7.20pm – 7.40pm, 2nd Innings: 7.40pm – 10.20pm

Friends Provident Trophy (50 overs)
1st Innings: 2.30pm – 6.00pm, Interval: 6.00pm – 6.45pm, 2nd Innings: 6.45pm – 10.15pm

Twenty20 Cup (20 overs) (group stage and quarterfinals)
1st Innings: 7.00pm – 8.15pm, Interval: 8.15pm – 8.30pm, 2nd Innings: 8.30pm – 9.45pm

Twenty20 Cup Final
1st Innings: 7.15pm – 8.30pm, Interval: 8.30pm – 8.45pm, 2nd Innings: 8.45pm – 10.00pm

One Day Internationals (50 overs)
1st Innings: 2.30pm – 6.00pm, Interval: 6.00pm – 6.45pm, 2nd Innings: 6.45pm – 10.15pm
