= Wajahatullah Wasti =

Pakistani cricketer (born 1974)

Wajahatullah Wastisd
Personal information
- Full name: Syed Wajahatullah Wasti
- Born: 11 November 1974 (age 52); Peshawar, Pakistan
- Batting: Right-handed
- Bowling: Right-arm offbreak

International information
- National side: Pakistan
- Test debut (cap 156): 16 February 1999 v India
- Last Test: 5 May 2000 v West Indies
- ODI debut (cap 125): 16 March 1999 v Bangladesh
- Last ODI: 16 April 2000 v West Indies

Career statistics
Competition	Test	ODI
Matches	6	15
Runs scored	329	349
Batting average	36.55	23.26
100s/50s	2/0	0/1
Top score	133	84
Balls bowled	18	55
Wickets	0	3
Bowling average	–	23.00
5 wickets in innings	–	0
10 wickets in match	–	0
Best bowling	–	3/36
Catches/stumpings	7/–	5/–
Medal record
Men's Cricket
Representing Pakistan
ICC Cricket World Cup
Runner-up	1999 England-Wales -Ireland-Scotland-Netherlands
- Source: ESPNcricinfo, 4 February 2006

Wajahatullah Wasti (Urdu: وجاہت اللہ واسطی; born 11 November 1974) is a Pakistani cricketer. He is member of The National Selection Committee Pakistan Cricket Board . He is a right-handed batsman and a right-arm offbreak bowler. Wasti played in six Test matches between February 1999 and May 2000, but soon found himself out of the side after much criticism on his performance. In just his second Test, he scored 133 and 121 not out against Sri Lanka at Lahore. He was a part of the Pakistan squad which finished as runners-up at the 1999 Cricket World Cup. His best ODI performance was a classy, stroke-filled 84 against New Zealand in the 1999 Cricket World Cup semifinal, which Pakistan won by nine wickets. Wasti took 123 balls to make that score, carving 10 boundaries and a six on the way. Wasti has not played international cricket since May 2000.
