= Run out =

Method of dismissal in cricket

A run out is a method of dismissal in cricket where a fielder breaks the wicket while the batter is outside their crease. It most commonly happens when a batter is attempting to score a run, but can also occur if they leave their crease while the ball is still in play.

Run out is governed by Law 38 of the laws of cricket. If the batter is judged run out, the run does not count and the bowler does not get credit for the wicket.

A run out can also be effected when the batters are not attempting a run if one of them leaves the crease when the ball is not dead. Some such dismissals cause controversy because they challenge long-established — but not universal — conventions about the spirit of the game.

== Definition ==
A batter is run out if, at any time while the ball is in play, no part of their bat or person is grounded behind the popping crease and their wicket is fairly broken by the action of a fielder. The batter whose ground is at the end where the wicket is broken is out.

A batter can be run out even when not attempting a run if they are out of their crease and the wicket is put down by a fielder. For example, the striker is run out if the batter plays the ball which is collected by a close fielder and the wicket is broken when the striker has left their ground to play the ball.

If a batter has a runner, the batter must also stay in the crease when the ball is in play, and the batter can be run out if they or their runner are out of the crease when the wicket is broken.

=== Exceptions ===
A batter may be run out whether or not a run is being attempted, even if the delivery is declared a no-ball or a wide except for the following circumstances:

- A batter has been within the popping crease and has subsequently left it to avoid injury, when the wicket is put down.
- The ball bowled by the bowler has not made any contact with a fielder before the wicket is put down.
- A batter is given out stumped.
- A no-ball has been called, no attempt to run is made by the batter, and the wicket is put down by the wicket-keeper without another fielder's intervention. This prevents what would be a stumping — were it not called a no-ball — being ruled a run out instead.

=== Non-striker leaving their ground early ===
As a bowler enters their delivery stride, the non-striking batter might back up, meaning they leave their popping crease early and move towards the other end of the wicket, so that, if the batters attempt a run, that run can be completed quickly. At any time from the moment the ball comes into play (i.e. when the bowler starts their run-up) until the instant when the bowler would normally have been expected to release the ball, if the non-striker is out of their ground, they can be run out. This is judged to be before the bowler's bowling arm has passed the vertical.

While a generous bowler may warn a batter to stay in their crease rather than to take their wicket, it is not required by the laws of cricket nor the guidance notes by MCC on the spirit of cricket to do so. It is a legitimate mode of dismissal, and the International Cricket Council (ICC) playing conditions match the MCC Laws in this respect.

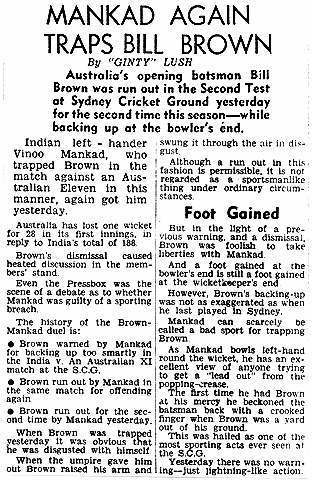
News report of Bill Brown's runout

One of the earliest recorded examples came in a match between Eton and Harrow in 1850, when Harrow's Charles Austen-Leigh was run out "backing up" by Eton bowler William Prest. The most notable example of this method of dismissal involved the Indian bowler Vinoo Mankad who ran out Bill Brown on 13 December 1947 in the second test during India's tour of Australia at Sydney. Mankad when, in the act of delivering the ball, he held on to it and removed the bails with Brown well out of his crease. Since this incident, a batter dismissed in this fashion was informally said to have been "Mankaded".

Until 2022 this mode of dismissal was part of Law 41-Unfair play. but it is now wholly within Law 38 (Run Out). Some observers feel that dismissing a batter in this way is poor sporting etiquette and against the spirit of the game, while others believe that the laws and regulations exist to be used as a structure of the game and that it is legitimate and sporting to exercise them. Such dismissals have on occasion provoked debate. In July 2014, when England's Jos Buttler was run out by Sri Lanka's Sachithra Senanayake, the World Cricket Council, an independent consultative body of former international captains and umpires, unanimously expressed support of Sri Lanka's actions. In contrast, in March 2019, when Buttler was dismissed in the same way by Ravichandran Ashwin in the 2019 Indian Premier League, an MCC spokesman said that while the mode of dismissal is legitimate, this particular dismissal was not in the "spirit of the game" because of the timing of the breaking of the wicket, a judgement that is now explicit in the Law.

=== Runs scored ===
If either batter is run out, the run in progress when the wicket is put down is not counted. Any runs completed will be counted, together with any runs for penalties awarded to either side.

If the striker has a runner and is themself run out (which would be at the striker's end), then no runs count and the umpire returns the non-striker to the original (non-striking) end. If the striker's runner, a non-striker's runner, or the non-striker themselves, is run out, runs completed will be counted.

=== Credit ===
The bowler does not get credit for the wicket as part of their match bowling figures. Credit is given to the "primary" fielder who gathers the ball and either puts down the wicket or makes the ball available for another player to do so, and any other "assistant" fielders who touch the ball, including a player who ultimately puts down the wicket. The bowler may act as the primary fielder or assistant fielder.

=== Examples of being run out ===
The most common run out is one where the two batters attempt to add a score by running but one of them is not quick enough to reach safe ground at their end. Attempting to score a run with a significant amount of risk of a run out is often described as a "quick single". In such quick singles, the difference between a run and a run out can be if the fielder is accurate enough to score a "direct hit" by throwing the ball into the stumps and dislodging the bails, rather than the slower method of relaying the ball to another fielder or the wicket-keeper standing near the stumps who catches the ball then dislodges them. Highly accurate and quick throwing fielders were celebrated for their ability to both prevent runs and take wickets, with players like Ricky Ponting, Jonty Rhodes and Andrew Symonds considered the benchmark in this area.

Breaking the wicket does not require the bails to be on the stumps, and as such it is possible for a team to attempt a run-out, knock the bails off, but have the batters attempt another run, at which point a fielder can effect the run out by grabbing the stump while holding the ball directly against the stump and pulling the stump out of the ground. There is no "double play" in Cricket as the ball is immediately dead when a wicket is taken. However there is also no requirement to immediately stop the play solely because a wicket may have been taken. This can lead to a situation where a team attempts a run-out at one end, then turns and throws the ball to the other. If the first appeal is an out, then the first batter is out. If the first appeal is not out then the second appeal can be adjudicated on as normal.

It is not required for the batters to be attempting a run for one of them to be run out. Batters often setup for a delivery with their entire body outside the crease. If they play a stroke but forget to retreat back into their crease a quick throw from a fielder can get them out. It is also possible for a non-striker to be run out if they step out of their crease during the delivery and the ball is hit back up the pitch and deflected off a fielder (commonly the bowler) into the wickets.

Accidental collisions between a batter and fielder do not confer an immunity to being run out to the batters. The umpires do have the ability under Law 41.5 (deliberate distraction, deception or obstruction of batter) to declare that a collision was deliberate and in that situation they can call a dead ball and potentially punish the fielding side or refer the fielder for discipline. Accidental collisions where a run out was attempted can see the captain of the fielding side choose to withdraw the appeal under Law 31.8 (withdrawal of an appeal) due to the Unspoken rule of "the Spirit of Cricket" where it has long been seen as unsporting to dismiss a batter for an accidental collision. During a 1996 international match a collision between South Africa's Fanie de Villiers and India's Sourav Ganguly occurred when the ball dropped at the feet of Ganguly, and the pair collided after both tried to step to the same side to avoid each other as de Villiers ran in to collect the ball. Ganguly got up quickly and continued to run but appeared to be short of his ground. After a brief deliberation the captain of South Africa Hansie Cronje withdrew the appeal.

Players can gain a reputation as being poor runners between the wickets, accumulating large amounts of run outs from bad decision making, or being known for running out their partner by calling to run then backtracking. Inzamam-ul-Haq of Pakistan gained such a reputation over the course of his 50 over international career as he amassed 40 dismissals in this fashion, as well as causing numerous dismissals of his batting partner. Toward the end of his career he became the 2nd most dismissed batsman by run outs in one day international games.

Running between the wickets is the same for all players as long as no runner is involved but players with less experience running due to a lack of time spent batting, such as the specialist bowlers at the tailend of an innings can become confused or freeze instead of running. An experienced batting partner may try for overly risky plays that an inexperienced partner is unable to make. An example of a running mistake under pressure was in the 1999 Cricket World Cup 2nd semi-final between Australia and South Africa. South Africa were batting and had drawn the scores level at 213 each with four balls remaining in the final over. South Africa needed to win as the tiebreaker would put Australia into the final. At the crease were the last wicket partnership of power hitting all-rounder Lance Klusener, who had just smashed a pair of fours to level the scores, and the number 11 Allan Donald at the non-strikers end. On the 3rd ball of the over Donald strayed too far from the non-strikers and was almost run out when Darren Lehmann missed the stumps from a few meters away. On the 4th and soon to be final ball of the match Klusener once again hit the ball back down the pitch this time to Mark Waugh. Donald had turned back to the crease to avoid a repeat of the near-miss but Klusener charged down the pitch calling for Donald to run. Donald turned back around and in the process dropped his bat, leaving him well out of his crease had Waugh hit the stumps. Instead the ball flew past the stumps to Damien Fleming, who calmly rolled the ball to the strikers end where Adam Gilchrist broke the wicket to dismiss Donald who was stuck watching in the middle of the wicket with no bat as Klusener ran off the pitch knowing he had just cost his team entry into the final where Australia won the tournament against Pakistan.

Donald Bradman, statistically the best Test batter of all time, was only run out once in 52 matches.

=== Ball in play ===
The batter can only be run out if the ball is in play and not a Dead ball. In the majority of run outs there is little question over the status of play but the dead ball law can become involved when players leave the crease under a mistaken impression that the ball is dead when it is not.

The batters may cause a run out by intentionally leaving the crease without any attempt to score a run. This can be to talk to the non-striker, to pat the pitch or a celebration of a milestone. They can do this because of the customary understanding with the fielding team that the ball is considered dead at that time. If that understanding breaks down or if a fielder has not yet returned the ball to the wicket keeper or bowler the team might put down the wicket. The fielding team must appeal for any dismissal to occur, and the fielding captain may withdraw the appeal if they view it to be unwarranted by the spirit of the game. If an appeal is made the umpire must give the batter out if they are out of their ground unless it was a dead ball by that point. In a Test match in 2006 Muttiah Muralitharan left his crease after completing one run, to congratulate Kumar Sangakkara on century. Muralitharan was run out by Brendon McCullum, the appeal stood and the innings closed with Sangakkara finishing on 100 not out. McCullum subsequently stated that he regretted that his actions were not within the spirit of the game.

Law 31.7 (Batter leaving the wicket under a misapprehension) allows the umpires to call a dead ball when a player believes they were out. This can impact on a run out if for example the player believed they had been caught, or that an umpire had signalled an out for another type of dismissal, and left the crease to then leave the field. Shan Masood benefited from this law in 2024 when he would have been out Hit wicket off a No-ball, with the umpire declaring a dead ball before he was run out at the bowlers end after he gave up on running due to the hit wicket while his partner had run to the other end.

In a Test match against India in 2011, Ian Bell was initially given run out after leaving his crease, wrongly assuming his shot had reached the boundary, but the appeal was later withdrawn by the fielding captain MS Dhoni and Bell was allowed to resume his innings. The essential distinction of this incident is that the ball is automatically dead when it reaches the boundary (interpretation by the umpire is not required), and so Bell left his crease under a misapprehension that may have been reinforced by the actions of some of the fielding team, who were under the same misapprehension. An intention to deceive the batter is explicitly unfair and would itself cause the ball to become adjudged dead by the umpire, but otherwise a batter is still run out on appeal if they are out of their ground wrongly believing the ball to have become automatically dead. Azhar Ali was run out in identical manner playing against Australia. The ball stopped well before the boundary, Mitchell Starc returned the ball to wicketkeeper Tim Paine and broke the wicket as Azhar and batting partner Asad Shafiq were standing in the middle of the pitch watching as the ball was thrown in. Azhar later spoke about the incident, calling it "my own fault" and that his family would remind him about it for years.

== See also ==
A stumping dismissal is similar to a run out but is performed solely by the Wicketkeeper after immediately collecting a delivery. Obstructing the field and Hit the ball twice are rare dismissals that can be caused by an attempt to avoid a run out occurring.

Other sports have similar rules in place where players have to reach a safe harbour like the crease in Cricket. In baseball there is the Force play, the Tag out and the Pickoff, similar to Mankading
