= 1999 Cricket World Cup 2nd semi-final =

1999 Cricket World Cup 2nd semi final
- Event: 1999 Cricket World Cup
| Australia | South Africa |
| (Australia) | (South Africa) |
| 213 | 213 |
| 49.2 overs | 49.4 overs |
- Match Tied
- Date: 17 June 1999
- Venue: Edgbaston, Birmingham
- Umpires: David Shepherd and Srinivas Venkataraghavan

The second semi-final of the 1999 Cricket World Cup was a One Day International (ODI) match played on 17 June 1999 at Edgbaston Cricket Ground in Birmingham, England. It was played between South Africa and Australia. The match ended in a tie after a run out between Allan Donald and Lance Klusener ended the match which resulted in Australia winning a place in the final where they would play against Pakistan.

== Background ==
13 June 1999
Scorecard

| South Africa; 271/7 (50 overs) | v | Australia; 272/5 (49.4 overs) |
| Herschelle Gibbs 101 (134); Damien Fleming 3/57 (10 overs) | | Steve Waugh 120* (110); Steve Elworthy 2/46 (10 overs) |

Australia won by 5 wickets
Headingley, Leeds, England
Umpires: Srinivasaraghavan Venkataraghavan (Ind) and Peter Willey (Eng)
Player of the match: Steve Waugh (Aus)

- South Africa won the toss and elected to bat.

The two teams had faced each other in a Super six match, which would eventually prove to be the deciding factor in determining which of the two teams would qualify for the final. South Africa batted first and put up a competitive total, with Herschelle Gibbs scoring 101. In reply, Australia began losing wickets at regular intervals. The turning point of the match occurred when captain Steve Waugh was dropped by Gibbs at short mid-wicket, as Gibbs attempted to throw the ball up into the air in celebration, only for the ball to slip through his fingers. After the dropped chance, Waugh was reported to have famously said to Gibbs "You've just dropped the World Cup". Waugh denied saying this, but the quote has lived on in cricketing folklore. Waugh went on to score an unbeaten 120 and guided Australia home by 5 wickets.

Had Australia not won this game they would have been knocked out of the World Cup. However, with this victory they tied with South Africa on six points at end of the Super Six round and the teams finished in second and third places, respectively, when net-run-rate was used to differentiate them. Thus Australia finished ahead of South Africa in the table, which meant that, under the rules for this competition, in the event of a tie in the semi-final Australia would proceed to the final.

== The match ==
=== Details ===
17 June 1999
Scorecard

| Australia; 213 (49.2 overs) | v | South Africa; 213 (49.4 overs) |
| Michael Bevan 65 (110); Shaun Pollock 5/36 (9.2 overs) | | Jacques Kallis 53 (92); Shane Warne 4/29 (10 overs) |

Match tied
Edgbaston, Birmingham, England
Umpires: David Shepherd (Eng) and Srinivas Venkataraghavan (Ind)
Player of the match: Shane Warne (Aus)

- South Africa won the toss and elected to field.

South Africa won the toss and elected to field. In steaming conditions, Australia managed to put up a total of 213 with Michael Bevan and Steve Waugh scoring vital half-centuries. Shaun Pollock and Allan Donald tore through the middle and lower order picking up 9 of the ten wickets between them. South Africa began their chase steadily with Kirsten and Gibbs putting on a good opening partnership. Wickets then fell at regular intervals as South Africa collapsed to 61–4. Jonty Rhodes and Jacques Kallis then put together a vital partnership taking South Africa within 69 runs of victory. Through some valuable runs from Mark Boucher and Pollock, and some big hitting from Lance Klusener, South Africa moved closer to the target

=== Final Over ===
South Africa entered the final over at 205/9, needing a further nine runs to win. The two men at the crease were Lance Klusener who was on strike and Allan Donald at the other end. Damien Fleming was the bowler.

- 1st ball : Fleming bowled a full ball to Klusener who cover drove it away to the boundary for four runs.
- 2nd ball : Fleming again bowled full but Klusener also hit this ball hard along the ground past Mark Waugh, who was standing at long-off, for another boundary. Klusener had made his way to 31 runs off just 14 balls and South Africa were now level, but they still needed one more run to advance into the final. On this delivery, Australian commentator Bill Lawry said "He's hit it hard...that's Mark Waugh down there, he won't get it – they are level! South African commentator Mike Proctor then said "What kind of shot is that? That's unbelievable, is he going to do it again for South Africa? He has done it on so many occasions. The first two deliveries of this over, he has gone bang, bang four, four – take that! Scores are level, South Africa need one to win to reach the final." At that point, Bill Lawry reminded him that South Africa only had one wicket in hand and Australia would go through in the event of a tie.

At that point, the Australian captain, Steve Waugh, brought his field up inside the circle to prevent a single being taken.

- 3rd ball : The third ball saw Klusener mis-hit his shot to Darren Lehmann, who was standing at mid-on. Allan Donald was backing up a long way at the non-striker's end, and if Lehmann's close range throw at the stumps had hit, Donald would have been easily run out. Mike Proctor remarked "that could be the difference between a World Cup final or nothing."
- 4th ball : The fourth ball was similar to the third. Klusener mis-hit to Mark Waugh at mid off, but this time Klusener went for the run, even though the chances of a run out were high and there were still two balls remaining. Klusener sprinted down the pitch while Donald, at the other end, was watching the ball instead of his partner and did not hear the call to run. Waugh threw the ball to Fleming who rolled it along the pitch to Adam Gilchrist standing over the stumps at the batsman's end. Donald (who had dropped his bat) was run out by some distance for a diamond duck. Bill Lawry commentating on the final ball said, "There it is, this will be out surely – oh it's out, it's gonna be run out...oh, that is South Africa out – Donald did not run, I cannot believe it. Australia go into the World Cup Final – ridiculous running with two balls to go. Donald did not go, Klusener came – what a disappointing end for South Africa. What a match for our viewers right around the world."

Australia tied the match and went into the final against Pakistan.

== Legacy ==
Australia went on to win the final at Lord's, beating Pakistan by eight wickets after bowling them out cheaply. They would then go on to win the 2003 and 2007 World Cups, and achieve a run of 34 World Cup matches without losing (which finally ended when they lost to Pakistan in the group stage of the 2011 World Cup).

South Africa, on the other hand, maintained their trend of choking or bad luck at the World Cup: in 1992 they had lost to England in the semi-finals when rain forced them to score 21 runs off the final ball, and in 1996 they had won all their group matches before losing to West Indies in the quarter-finals. The trend also went on to continue, as in 2003 as hosts, a Duckworth/Lewis miscalculation meant they tied Sri Lanka in their final group game at Kingsmead when victory would have seen them advancing to the Super Six. In 2015, they won their first knockout game against Sri Lanka and set co-host New Zealand a record World Cup knockout game chase target in their semifinal at Eden Park – and it might have been bigger had rain not shortened the South African innings – but miscues and the heroics of South African-born Grant Elliott undid them as New Zealand advanced to their first Cricket World Cup final.

South African coach Bob Woolmer resigned after this match. In 2007, shortly before his death, he revealed that Donald and most of his team-mates were in tears after the result and put towels over their heads so no-one could see them.

The Wisden Cricketers' Almanack opened its report of the match with: "This was not merely the match of the tournament: it must have been the best one-day international of the 1,483 so far played. The essence of the one-day game is a close finish, and this was by far the most significant to finish in the closest way of all – with both teams all out for the same score. But it was a compressed epic all the way through, and it ended in a savage twist." In 2000, the match featured among CricInfo's 100 great matches of the 20th century. Steve Waugh called it "the best game of cricket I've played", while in 2004 The Sydney Morning Herald ranked it the 20th-biggest moment in Australian cricket. In 2010, The Times rated South Africa's choke in the final over as the second-biggest sporting choke of all time. In 2009, Shaun Pollock revealed that when betting at the Durban July horse race shortly after the match, he was told "Whatever you do, don't bet on number 10, he doesn't run", a reference to Donald not running (he was wearing jersey number 10).

The twists, turns and close finish resulted in many observers regarding the match as the perfect One Day International from an entertainment perspective. The record-breaking ODI between Australia and South Africa seven years later, in 2006, continued the close rivalry between the two teams.
