= History of the Cricket World Cup =

Sports history article

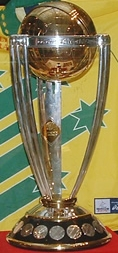
The Cricket World Cup Trophy.

The Cricket World Cup, the top-level competition in One Day International cricket, was first played in 1975. This tournament, known as The Prudential World Cup, was played in England and was won by the West Indies. Since then, the tournament has been played every four years, in a number of countries. Between eight and sixteen teams have contested the various competitions, and lengths of matches have ranged from 60 overs per side in the early tournaments down to 50 overs per side in recent ones.

== Prior to the World Cup ==
The first cricket Test match was played in 1877 between Australia and England. Cricket was contested at the 1900 Summer Olympics where Great Britain defeated France by 158 runs. However, the International Olympic Committee cancelled cricket as an Olympic sport afterwards.

The first attempt at arranging an international cricket competition was the 1912 Triangular Tournament. It was a Test cricket tournament played in England between all three Test playing nations at the time; England, Australia and South Africa. Due to poor weather and a lack of public interest, the experiment was not repeated. From then on, international Test cricket teams only generally engaged in bilateral series as opposed to tournaments or leagues involving more than two nations.

In the early 1960s, English county cricket teams began playing a shortened version of cricket, which only lasted for one day. One-day cricket started as a 4-team knockout competition, known as the Midlands Knock-Out Cup in 1962 and later as the Gillette Cup in 1963, and grew in popularity, resulting in a national league called the Sunday League to be created in 1969. The first One Day International came about from a rain-aborted Test match at Melbourne between England and Australia in 1971 and was played on the final scheduled day. The forty over match (eight balls per over) was used to fill the time as compensation for the frustrated crowd.

The success and popularity of the domestic one-day competitions in England and other parts of the world as well as the early One-day Internationals prompted the International Cricket Council to consider organising a Cricket World Cup.

== The Prudential World Cups ==
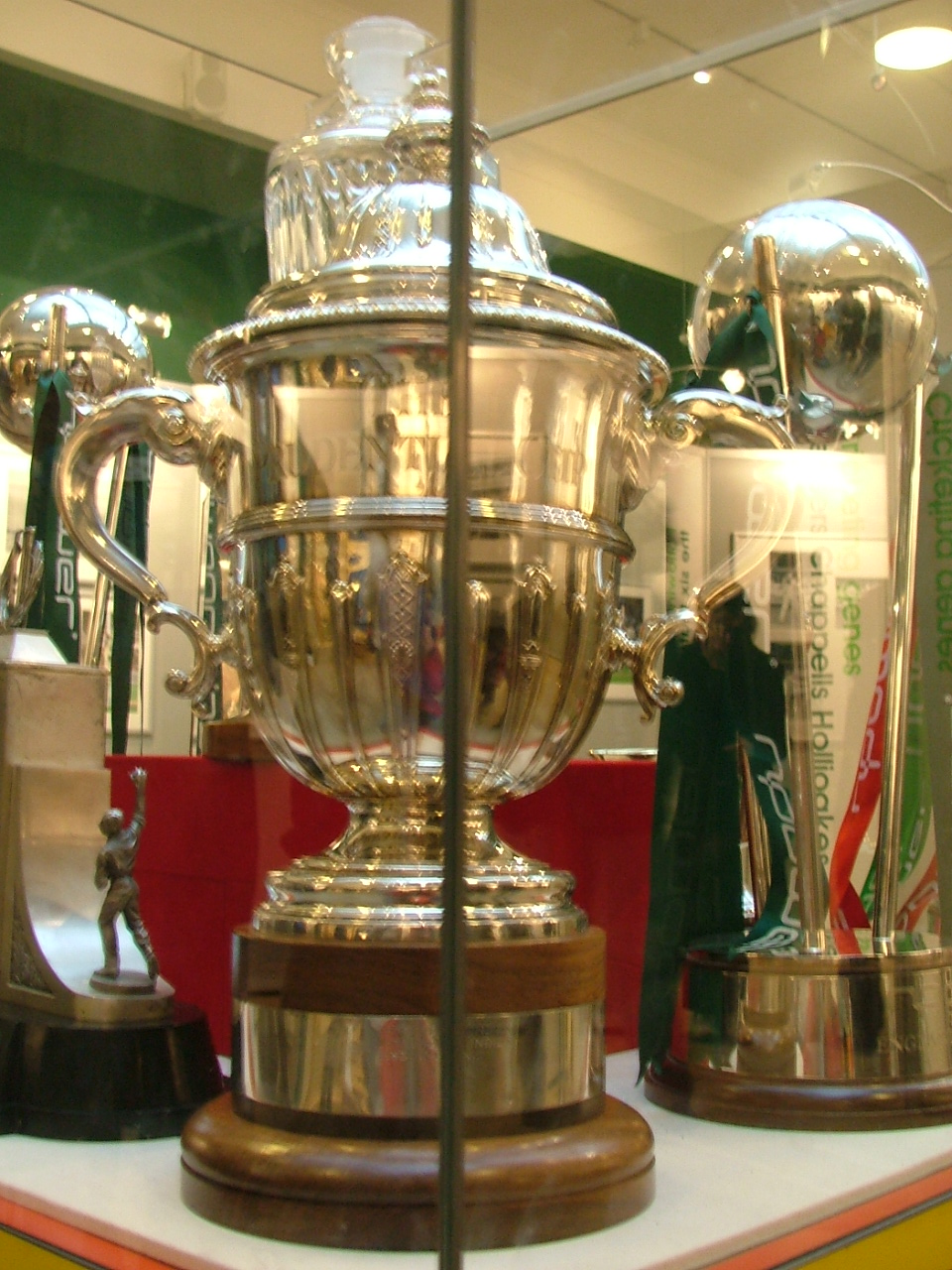
The Prudential Cup trophy

The Men's Cricket World Cup was first held in 1975 in England, which was the only nation that was able to put forward the resources to stage an event of such magnitude. The first three tournaments were officially known as the Prudential Cup after the financial services company Prudential plc who sponsored the event. The matches were of 60 overs per team and played in traditional white uniform and red balls. They were all played during the day. Eight teams participated in the first tournament: Australia, England, the West Indies, Pakistan, India, and New Zealand (the six Test nations at the time), with Sri Lanka and a composite team from East Africa. One notable omission was the South African cricket team who were not competing due to the international sports boycott. West Indies won the first Cricket World Cup by defeating Australia by 17 runs in the final.

The next two World Cups held in 1979 and 1983 were again hosted by England. The 1979 Cricket World Cup saw the introduction of the ICC Trophy, a competition used to select non-Test playing teams for the World Cup. Sri Lanka and Canada qualified through the ICC Trophy in 1979. West Indies again won the World Cup tournament, defeating England by 92 runs. At their meeting which followed the World Cup, the International Cricket Conference agreed to make the competition a four-yearly event.

The 1983 event was hosted by England for a third consecutive time. By this time, Sri Lanka had become a Test playing nation, and Zimbabwe qualified through the ICC Trophy. India were crowned champions after upsetting the West Indies by 43 runs in the final. The odds of India winning the cup were quoted at 66 to 1 before the competition began.

== 1987–1996 ==
The 1987 Cricket World Cup held in India and Pakistan was the first World Cup hosted outside England. It was also the first tournament where the West Indies were unable to reach the final. The games were reduced from 60 to 50 overs per innings, the current standard, because of the shorter daylight hours on the subcontinent when compared to England. Australia won the championship by defeating England by 7 runs, the closest margin in World Cup final history until 2019.

The 1992 Cricket World Cup held by Australia and New Zealand brought many changes to the game such as coloured clothing, white balls, day/night matches and an alteration to the fielding restrictions. It was the first tournament that the South African cricket team played in, following the end of the international sports boycott. Referred as the 'Cornered Tigers' at the time, Pakistan overcame a dismal start to emerge as winners, defeating England by 22 runs in the final at the Melbourne Cricket Ground.

The 1996 championship was held in the Indian subcontinent for the second time, with the inclusion of Sri Lanka as host of some of its group stage matches. It occurred behind the backdrop of political upheaval in world cricket, after a spiteful Sri Lankan tour of Australia in 1995/96. After the no-balling of Sri Lankan off spinner Muttiah Muralitharan by Darrell Hair in a Test match at the Melbourne Cricket Ground, the tour ended in a spiteful ODI final in Sydney which saw physical contact between Glenn McGrath and Sanath Jayasuriya, and the refusal of the Sri Lankans to shake hands at the end of the match. Some Australian players received death threats, which were compounded by a Tamil Tiger bombing in Colombo. Australia and West Indies refused to play their respective matches against Sri Lanka there, causing both matches to be awarded to Sri Lanka by default. After protracted negotiations, Kenya and Zimbabwe agreed to fulfil their fixtures in Sri Lanka. The Australian led boycott drew heavy criticism from subcontinental cricket officials, with former Indian captain Kapil Dev calling for Australia to be expelled.

On the field, the abrasive and dry subcontinent surfaces resulted in batting conditions being optimal early in the innings before the ball became softer and more difficult to strike. Of the five leading run-scorers, four were opening batsmen, with Mark Waugh becoming the first batsman to score three centuries in a tournament. Spin bowlers were the most effective, with four of the leading six wicket-takers. The quarter finals saw co-hosts India and Pakistan meet in Bangalore. After Pakistani captain Wasim Akram withdrew due to injury, Ajay Jadeja struck 40 from the last two overs from Waqar Younis, setting Pakistan a target of 288. Pakistan were going well at 109/1, but after Aamer Sohail confronted taunted Indian bowler Venkatesh Prasad after striking a boundary, Prasad bowled him immediately after, sparking a collapse of 3/19, all to Prasad. After falling 39 runs short, the Government of Pakistan launched an inquiry into the performance, after angry protests by the public which left one person dead, and accusations of match-fixing were levelled at Wasim. In the other quarter finals, Australia and Sri Lanka defeated New Zealand and England respectively, while South Africa, who were previously undefeated, were upset by the West Indies.

In the semi-final, Sri Lanka, headed towards a crushing victory over India at Eden Gardens (Calcutta) after their hosts slumped to 120/8 from being 98/1 in pursuit of 252, were awarded victory by default after riots broke out in protest against the Indian performance. In the other semi-final in Mohali, Australia defeated the West Indies after the Caribbean team lost their last seven wickets for 29 runs in their run-chase. Sri Lanka went on to claim their inaugural championship by defeating the favourites Australia in the final by seven wickets, held in Lahore. Tension remained between the two sides after the Australian series, with Sri Lankan captain Arjuna Ranatunga declaring Australian leg spinner Shane Warne in the media before the match, and proceeding to poke his tongue at Warne during the match after hitting a six. Aravinda de Silva was named man of the match, as he was in the semi-final.

== Australian treble ==
The 1999 event returned to England after sixteen years with some matches also held in Ireland, Scotland and the Netherlands. After losing two matches in the group phase, one of the favourites, Australia needed to avoid defeat in seven consecutive matches to win the title. They subsequently were required to defeat South Africa in the final Super Six match at Headingley. After South Africa had reached 271, Australia were struggling when captain Steve Waugh hit a ball straight to Herschelle Gibbs, who dropped it after trying to throw the ball into the air in celebration, eliciting the barb from Waugh that he had "dropped the World Cup". Waugh struck an unbeaten century to guide Australia to their target in their Super Six match against South Africa off the final ball of the match. Australia then faced South Africa again in the semi-final and posted a target of 213. South Africa needed nine runs from the final over with one wicket remaining, with man of the tournament Lance Klusener on strike. He struck the first two balls to the fence, leaving one run from the remaining four balls. However, a mix-up between Klusener and Allan Donald on the fourth ball saw Donald drop his bat and be stranded mid-pitch to be run out. The match was a tie, allowing Australia to advance to the final due to earlier results. In the other semi-final, Pakistan, who had qualified first in both the group and Super Six phase, defeated New Zealand by nine wickets. In the final Australia dismissed Pakistan for 132 and reached the target in just over 20 overs, with eight wickets in hand.

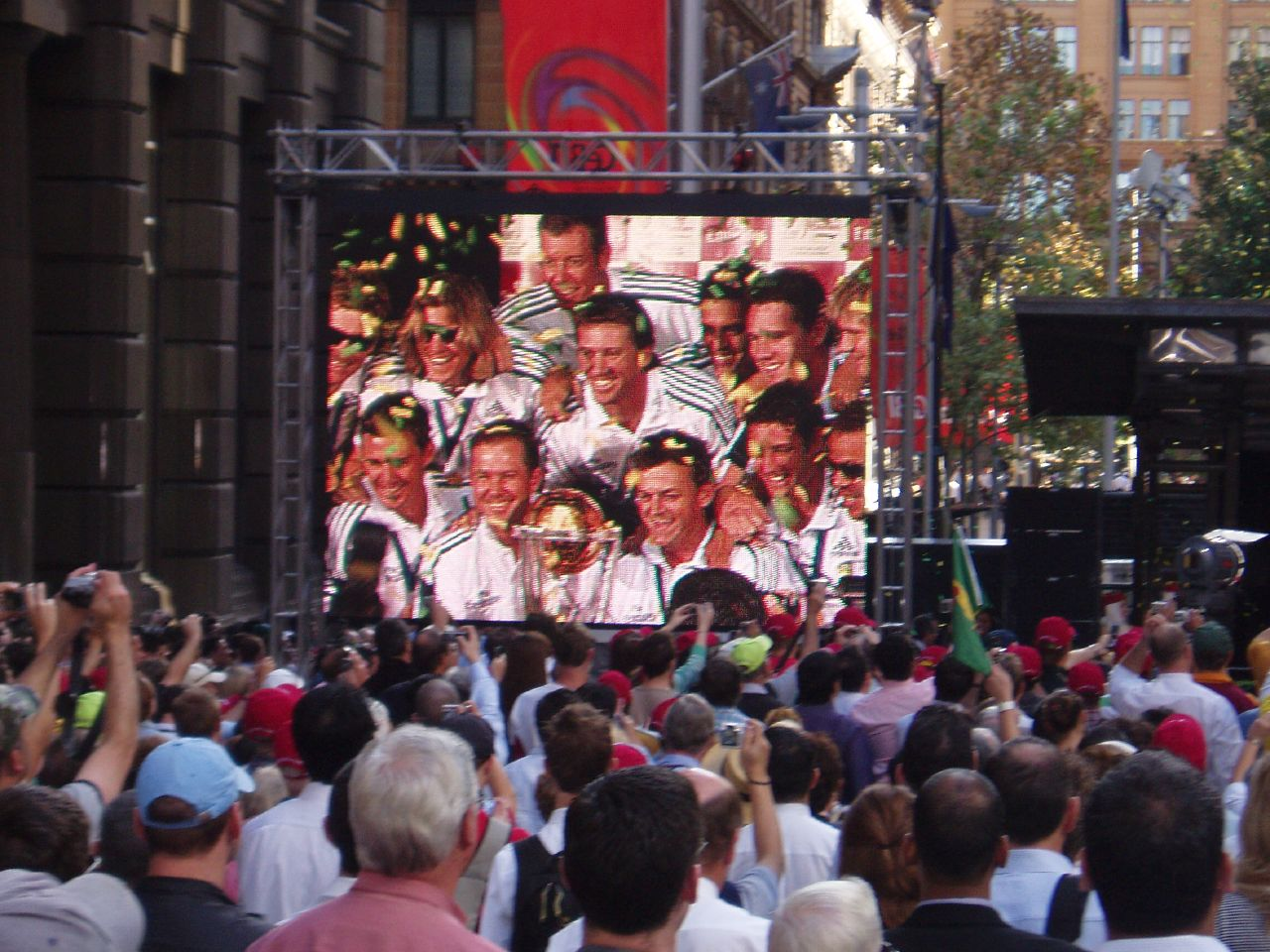
A large crowd of over 10,000 fans welcome to the Australian team on completing the first World Cup hat-trick – Martin Place, Sydney.

South Africa, Zimbabwe and Kenya hosted the 2003 Cricket World Cup. The number of teams participating in the event increased from twelve to fourteen. Because of political pressure and security concerns respectively, Zimbabwe and Kenya were awarded their matches against England and New Zealand respectively, after the latter teams forfeited the matches. Kenya's victories against Sri Lanka and Zimbabwe, among others, along with New Zealand's forfeit helped them get a Semi-final berth against India, the best result by an associate. India went on to defeat the Kenyans to set up a final against Australia in Johannesburg, who had defeated Sri Lanka in the other Semi-final. In the final, Australia made 359 runs for the loss of two wickets, the largest ever total in a final, to defeat India by 125 runs.

In 2007 the tournament was hosted by the West Indies; the Cricket World Cup became the first such tournament to be hosted on all six populated continents- Europe (1975, 1979, 1983, 1999); Asia (1987, 1996); Australasia (1992); Africa (2003); North and South America (2007). Ireland making their World Cup debut tied with Zimbabwe and defeated Pakistan to progress to the second round, where they went on to defeating Bangladesh to get promoted to the main ODI table. Following their defeat to Ireland, the Pakistani coach Bob Woolmer was found dead in his hotel room; contrasting reports from different sources say that he was either murdered or died of natural causes. Australia defeated Sri Lanka in the final by 53 runs (D/L), in farcical light conditions, extending their undefeated run in the World Cup to 29 matches and winning three straight World Cups.

== 2011 ==
The 2011 ICC Cricket World Cup was the tenth Cricket World Cup. It was played in India, Sri Lanka, and Bangladesh. India won the tournament, defeating Sri Lanka by 6 wickets in the final at the Wankhede Stadium in Mumbai, thus becoming the first country to win the Cricket World Cup final on home soil. India's Yuvraj Singh was declared the man of the tournament. This was the first time in World Cup history that two Asian teams had appeared in the final. It was also the first time since the 1992 World Cup that the final match did not feature Australia.

== Historical formats of final tournament ==
The number of teams in and the format of the final tournament has varied considerably over the years. In summary:

Year	Host nation(s)	Teams	Matches	Length in days	Format of first round	Format of latter stages
1975	England	8	15	14	2 groups of 4 with sides playing each other once	Semi-finals and final
1979	England	8	15	14	2 groups of 4 with sides playing each other once	Semi-finals and final
1983	England and Wales	8	27	16	2 groups of 4 with sides playing each other twice	Semi-finals and final
1987	India and Pakistan	8	27	31	2 groups of 4 with sides playing each other twice	Semi-finals and final
1992	Australia and New Zealand	9	39	32	1 group of 9 with sides playing each other once	Semi-finals and final
1996	Pakistan, India and Sri Lanka	12	37	32	2 groups of 6 with sides playing each other once	Quarter-finals, semi-finals and final
1999	England, Ireland, Netherlands, Scotland and Wales	12	42	37	2 groups of 6 with sides playing each other once	1 group of 6 (with sides playing the other group's top 3 once), semi-finals and final
2003	South Africa, Zimbabwe and Kenya	14	54	42	2 groups of 7 with sides playing each other once	1 group of 6 (with sides playing the other group's top 3 once), semi-finals and final
2007	West Indies	16	51	46	4 groups of 4 with sides playing each other once	1 groups of 8 (with sides playing the other group's top 4 once), semi-finals and final
2011	India, Sri Lanka and Bangladesh	14	49	42	2 groups of 7 with sides playing each other once	Quarter-finals, semi-finals and final
2015	Australia and New Zealand	14	49	43	2 groups of 7 with sides playing each other once	Quarter-finals, semi-finals and final
2019	England and Wales	10	48	45	1 group of 10 with sides playing each other once	Semi-finals and final
2023	India	10	48	45	1 group of 10 with sides playing each other once	Semi-finals and final
2027	South Africa, Zimbabwe and Namibia	14	54	42	2 groups of 7 with sides playing each other once	1 group of 6 (with sides playing the other group's top 3 once), semi-finals and final
2031	India and Bangladesh	14	54	42	2 groups of 7 with sides playing each other once	1 group of 6 (with sides playing the other group's top 3 once), semi-finals and final

=== Early format ===
The format of the Cricket World Cup has changed greatly over the course of its history. The first four tournaments had eight teams each, divided into two groups of four teams each. There were two stages, a group stage and a knockout stage. In the 1975 and 1979 Cricket World Cups, each team played a round-robin, while in the following two tournaments, each team played the rest in their group twice. The top two teams in each group played the semi-finals and the winners of the semi-finals played against each other in the final.

=== Trial formats ===
In the 1992 Cricket World Cup, all teams played each other once. The top four qualified for the knockout stage which was contested in similar fashion to the previous events. In the 1996 Cricket World Cup, the number of teams increased from nine to twelve and were divided into two groups. The top four teams of each group qualified for the knockout stage this time, which also included quarter-finals.

=== Super stage era ===
The 1999 Cricket World Cup tournament had a similar group stage format, but there were dramatic changes in the second stage with a "Super Six" round replacing the quarter-finals. There were still two groups of six but only three teams from each group went into the subsequent stage. In the Super Six round, each qualifier from Group A played against each qualifier from Group B. The teams earned points from their wins in the Super Six and also brought points scored against the two other teams who qualified from the same group in the group stages. The top four teams from the Super Six played the semi-finals and the rest of the tournament followed in similar fashion to its predecessors. The 2003 event had a similar structure to the 1999 competition. The number of participants rose to fourteen, with seven teams in each pool in the group stage. The Super Six qualifiers also carried forward one point for each win in the group stage against non-qualifiers, a complexity which was dropped for the next world cup.

The 2007 Cricket World Cup featured 16 teams allocated into four groups of four. Eleven teams having One Day International status qualified automatically for the tournament while the other five teams were selected from the ICC Trophy. Within each group, the teams played each other in a round-robin format and the top two teams advanced to the "Super 8" round. The eight remaining teams then played in a round-robin format, except that they did not play the other team that advanced from their respective group. The top four teams from the Super 8 round advanced to the semi-finals and the winners of the semi-finals then contested the final.

=== Return to a Quarter-Final format ===
In 2007, the Super 8 Round suffered from lack of crowds as a result of the tournament being too long (24 matches), but also due to big teams like India and Pakistan being knocked out of the tournament in the Group Stage.(2007 Cricket World Cup.) As a result, the ICC decided to exclude 2 teams from the 2011 tournament – dividing 14 teams into two groups of seven from which the top 4 teams from each group qualified for the Quarter Finals, this resulted in the addition of more matches into the earlier stages of the tournament as opposed to the second stage. Also adding more knockout matches (seven as opposed to the three in 2007) to increase interest in TV audiences.
