= County Cricket Ground, Hove =

Cricket ground in East Sussex, England

1st Central County Ground
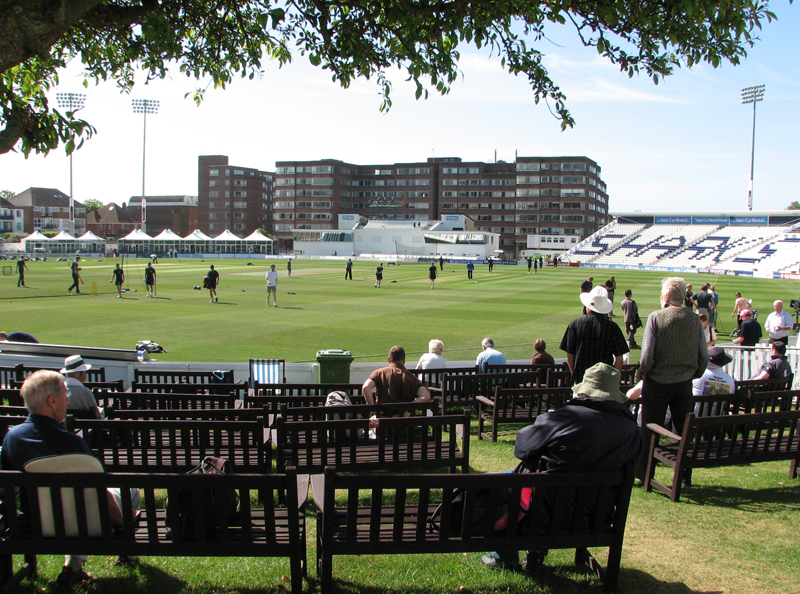
- Interactive map of 1st Central County Ground

Ground information
- Location: Hove, East Sussex
- Country: England
- Coordinates: 50°49′48″N 0°09′51″W
- Establishment: 1872
- Capacity: 6,000
- End names
- Cromwell Road End Sea End

International information
- Only men's ODI: 15 May 1999: India v South Africa
- First women's Test: 29 August – 1 September 1987: England v Australia
- Last women's Test: 9–12 August 2005: England v Australia
- First women's ODI: 23 June 1973: England v International XI
- Last women's ODI: 18 September 2022: England v India
- First women's T20I: 5 August 2004: England v New Zealand
- Last women's T20I: 23 May 2025: England v West Indies

Team information
Sussex	(1872 – present)
- As of 9 July 2024; Source: CricketArchive

The County Cricket Ground, known for sponsorship reasons as The 1st Central County Ground, is a cricket venue in Hove, in the city of Brighton and Hove, East Sussex, England. The County Ground is the home of Sussex County Cricket Club, where most Sussex home matches since 1872 have been played, although many other grounds in Sussex have been used. Sussex CCC have also played some of their games away from The County Ground, at either Eastbourne, Hastings, Arundel Castle or Horsham. It is one of the few county grounds to have deckchairs for spectators, in the Sussex CCC colours of blue and white, and was the first cricket ground to install permanent floodlights, for day/night cricket matches and the second ground (after Edgbaston) to host a day/night match in England, in 1997.

== Cricket history ==
Prior to 1872, Sussex County Cricket Club played their home matches at Royal Brunswick Ground. The land for the County Ground was a barley field until it was bought in 1871. The turf from the Royal Brunswick Ground was then brought to the County Ground, which became the home of Sussex CCC in 1872, and continues to be so.

In 1872, George "Farmer" Bennett became the first batsman in first-class cricket to be given out handled ball during a match between Kent and Sussex at the County Ground. In 1873, Sussex bowled Worcestershire out for 19 at Hove. In 1884–85, the public raised £4,400 towards the purchase of the ground, with the Earl of Sheffield contributing an additional £600. In the 20th century, the ground was used for some other cricket matches, such as a charity match in 1927 between the "Jockeys" and the "Racing Press", in aid of the Royal Sussex County Hospital and the Royal Alexandra Children's Hospital, and an annual match between local commercial travellers and grocers, nicknamed "Travellers v. Grocers"; in 1925, the match was won by the Travellers by 1 run.

The ground has hosted one men's One Day International; the match was part of the 1999 Cricket World Cup, and was a Group A match between South Africa and India, which South Africa won by 4 wickets. The County Ground has also hosted 2 Test matches in The Women's Ashes in 1987 and 2005; in addition, the ground hosted two One Day Internationals in the 2013 Women's Ashes, As of 2017, five Women's ODIs and four Women's T20Is have been hosted at the ground.

In 2003, the County Ground was the venue where Sussex won their first County Championship title. In that match, Sussex batsman Murray Goodwin also scored 335*, which was then highest score by a Sussex player in first-class cricket. (Note: As of 2015, the highest score by a Sussex batsman is now 344, scored by Goodwin at Taunton in 2009.) The ground also saw Sussex win their third Championship title in 2007. (Note: Sussex's second title was won in 2006 at Trent Bridge.)

== Non-cricket history ==
During the 1890s, the County Ground was also used as a football ground for teams from the Brighton Area, including Brighton United of the Southern League (until they went bust in 1900), and Brighton Athletic of the East Sussex League. The ground was also the venue for the Sussex lawn tennis championship meetings in 1893 and 1899, and in 1948, the County Ground also hosted a rugby union match between Brighton and a Midland Bank team.

Many concerts have been held at the County Ground. Elton John has played at the ground in 2006, 2011 and 2019, the ground has also hosted Madness, Lionel Richie (with Shane Filan of Westlife as support act), Little Mix, Olly Murs, Cliff Richard and Rod Stewart. As part of the 2012 Summer Olympics torch relay, the ground hosted an official Olympic torch event.

For many years, the County Ground has hosted a popular fireworks display within the South East, for Guy Fawkes Night. In 2019, the annual fireworks night sold out with over 7,500 attendees.

== Gallery ==
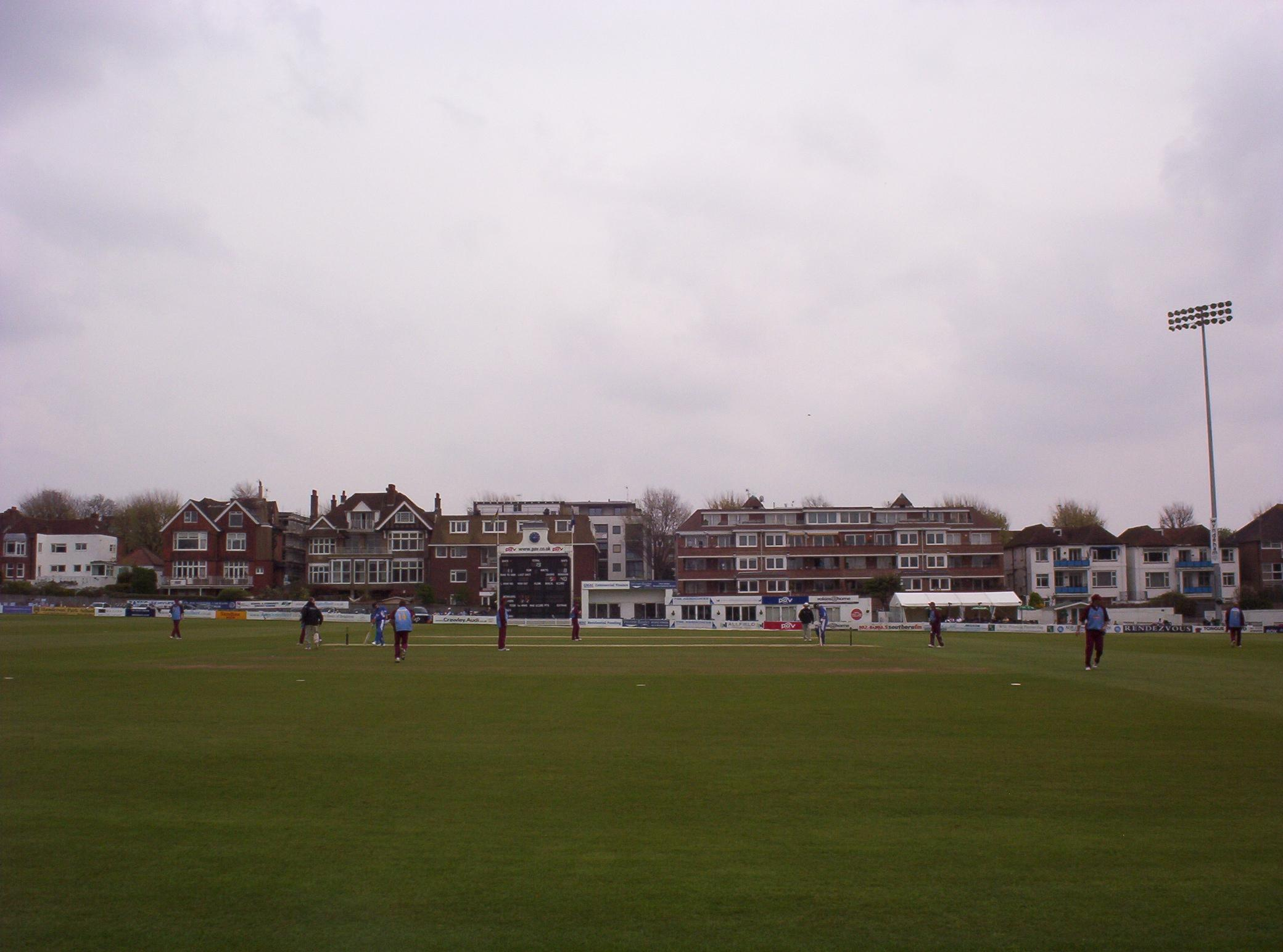
Sussex batting against Derbyshire on 24 April 2005

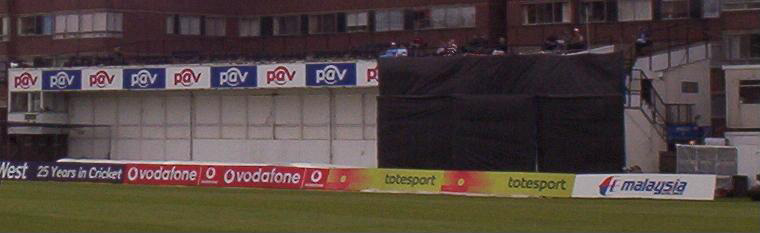
The former Arthur Gilligan stand

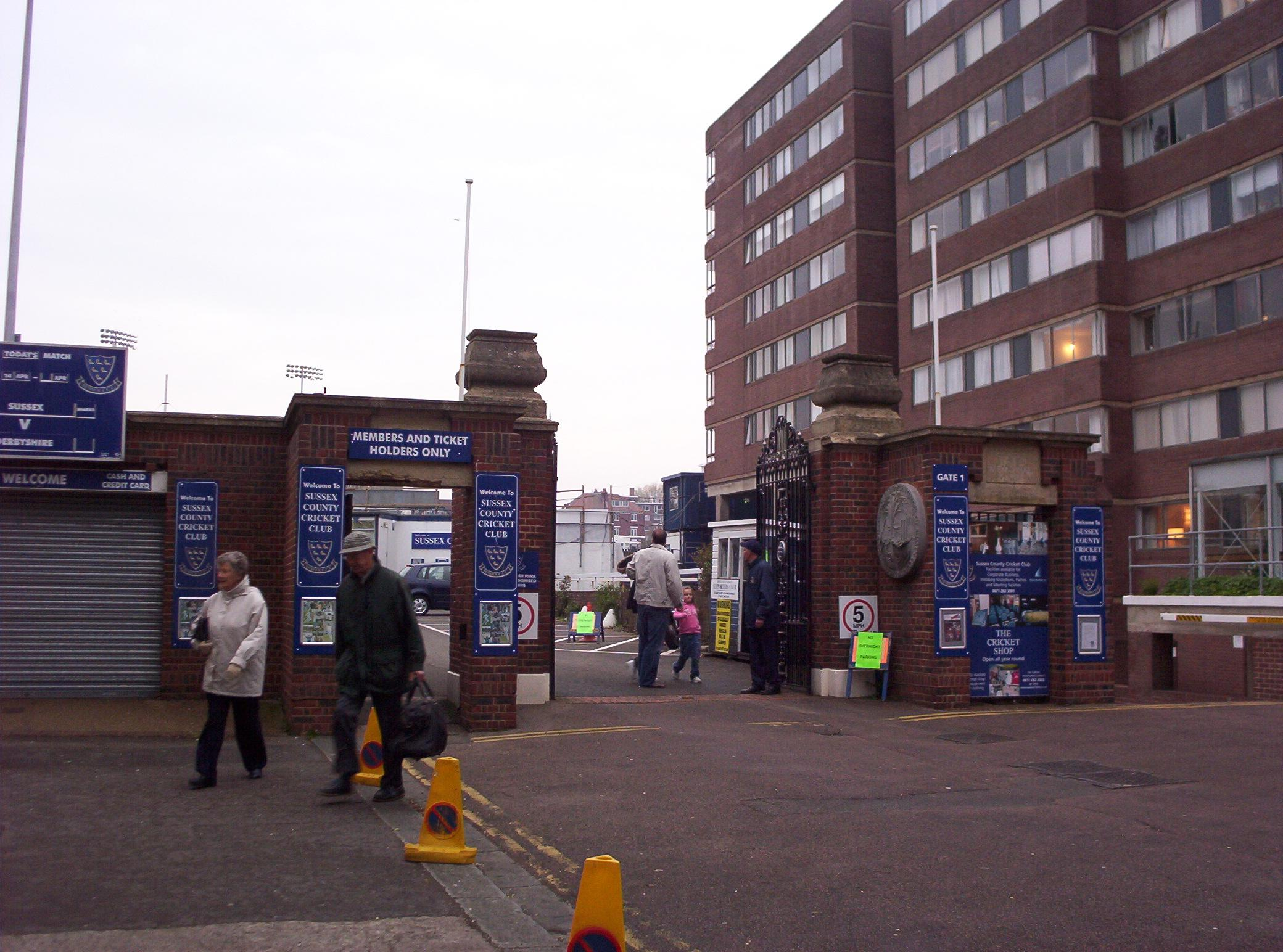
Leaving the County Ground

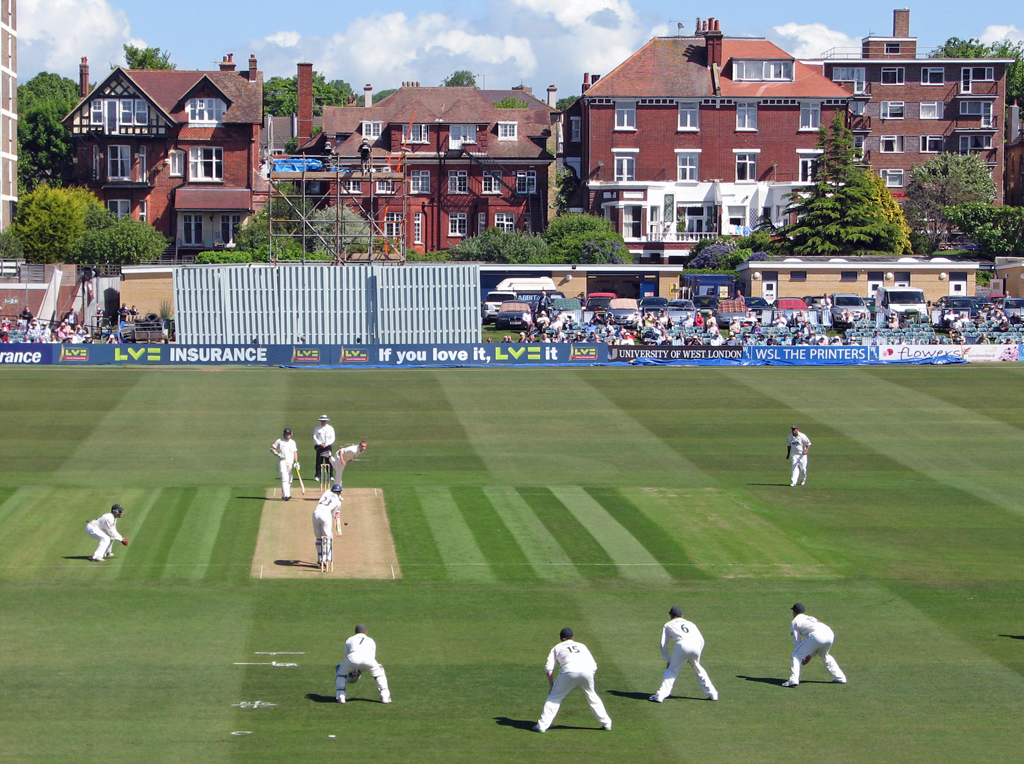
Sussex vs Nottinghamshire in 2011

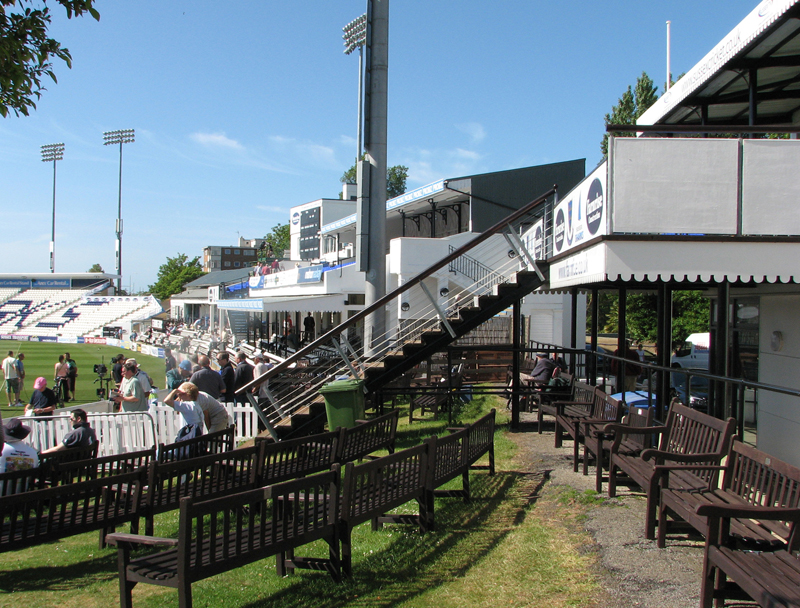
The Pavilion in 2011

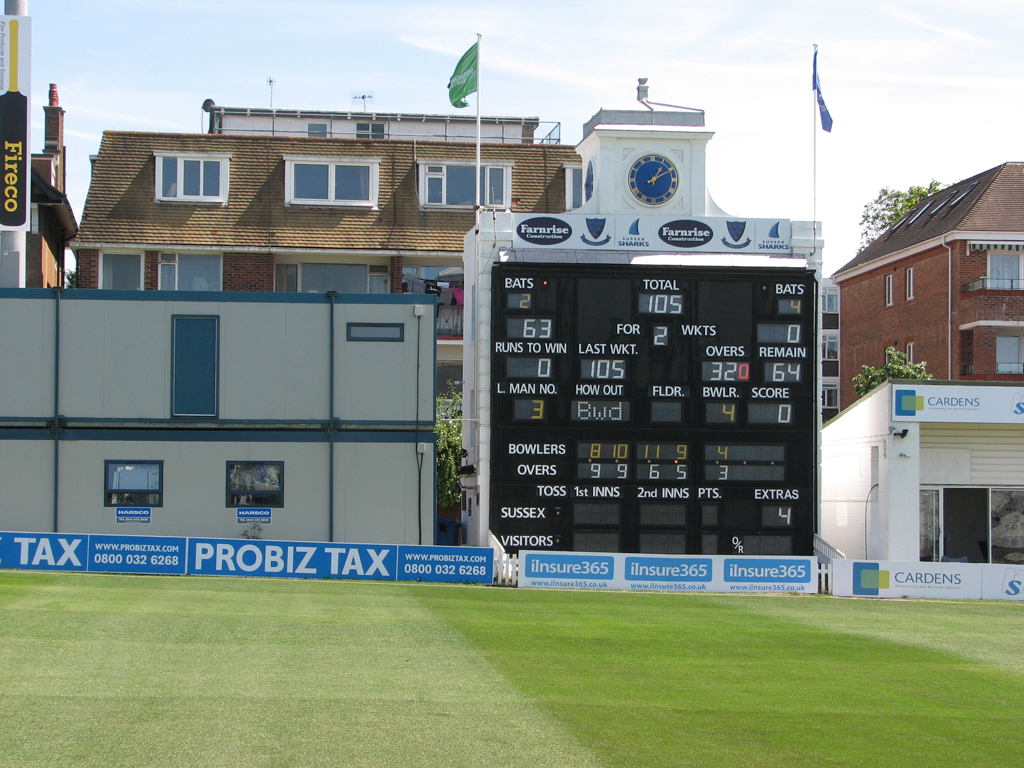
The scoreboard in 2011

== See also ==
- List of cricket grounds in England and Wales
- Media related to County Cricket Ground, Hove at Wikimedia Commons
