= Prest =

Prest or PREST may refer to:

- Prest (surname), people with the surname
- PREST, centre at the University of Manchester
- PrEST, a way of creating antibodies

== See also ==
- Saint-Prest
- Prest v Petrodel Resources Ltd
