= Runner (cricket) =

Team member in cricket

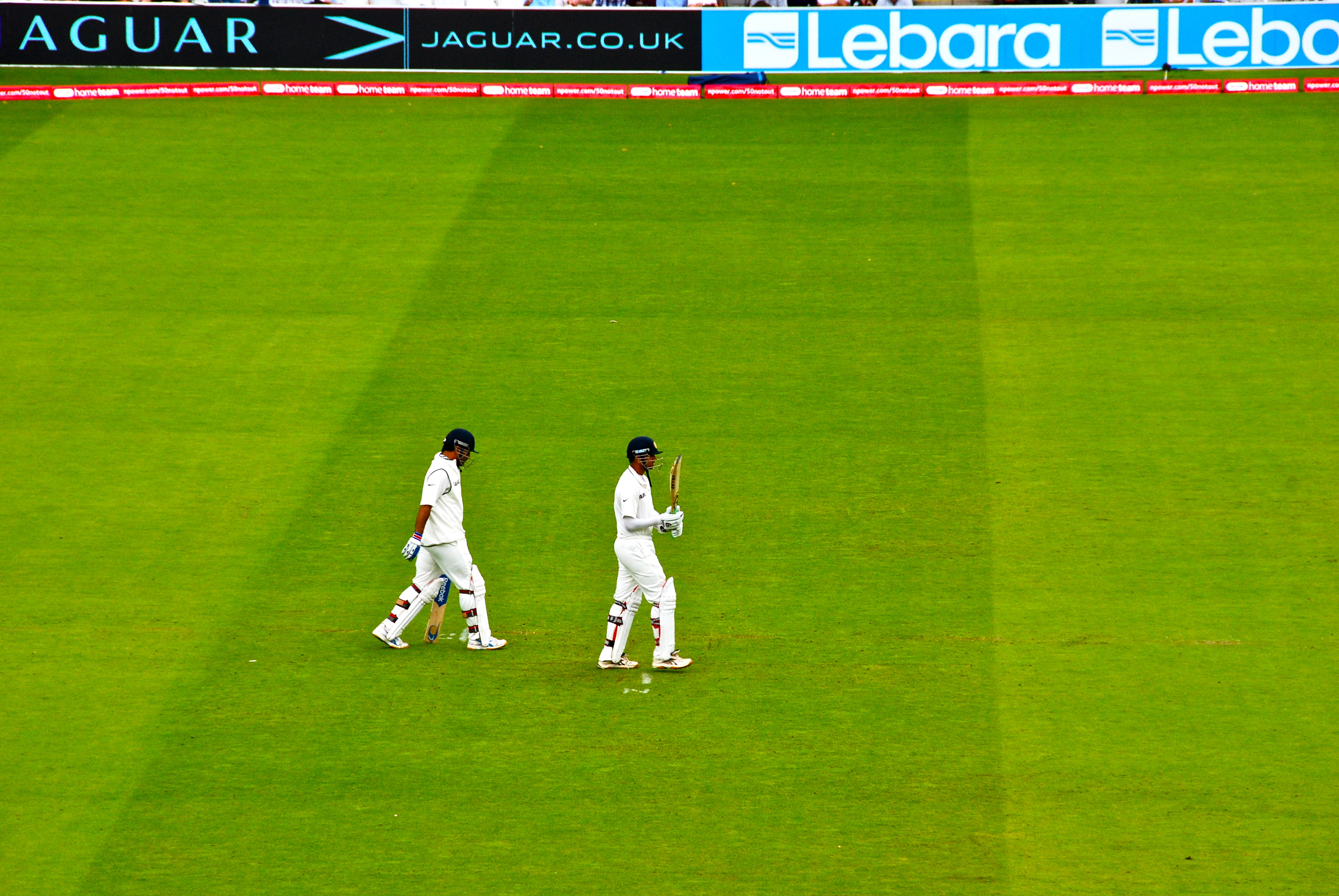
Zaheer Khan walking about to bat with Abhinav Mukund as his runner during the First Test against England in July 2011, shortly before runners were outlawed in international cricket.

In cricket, a runner is a team member who runs between the wickets for an injured batsman. This is covered by Law 25 of the Laws of Cricket.

When a runner is used, the batsman stands in position and plays shots as normal, but does not attempt to run between the wickets: the runner runs for them. The runner occupies the injured batsman's crease when they are on strike, but takes up a position away from the pitch at the umpire's discretion, typically on a pitch parallel to that being used for the game.

When the injured batsman moves off strike, they then take up the position near the square leg umpire (not at the bowler's end), and the runner stands next to the bowler's wicket as in the normal course of play.

- A runner can only be used if the umpires, together, are satisfied that the batsman has sustained an injury during the match that affects their ability to run.
- The runner must be a member of the batting side, but not the twelfth man.

The runner must also already have batted in the innings, if possible.

- The runner must wear all the external protective equipment worn by the batsman and must carry a bat.

If either the injured batsman or their runner is out of their ground, the batsman is liable to be run out or stumped. The runner is also subject to other laws such as obstructing the field.

In June 2011, the International Cricket Council announced that, from 1 October 2011, runners could no longer be used in international cricket.
