= Edward Prest =

English lawyer and cricketer (1830–1903)

Edward Brent Prest (4 January 1830 – 8 June 1903) was an English lawyer and a cricketer who played for Cambridge University, the Cambridge Town Club, and the Marylebone Cricket Club (MCC) in the 1850s. He was born in Stapleford, Cambridgeshire and died at Cambridge.

Prest was educated at Eton College and Trinity College, Cambridge. As a cricketer, he was a lower-order batsman and, although full details of all of his matches are not available, he does not appear to have bowled or kept wicket in first-class games, though he bowled in minor matches. His first first-class appearance was the 1850 University Match against Oxford University and he scored only one run in his two innings. He played one further match for the university side in 1850, then three games for the Cambridge Town Club between 1852 and 1854 and two for the MCC, one each in 1855 and 1859. After the 1855 MCC match he had had nine innings in first-class cricket, scored 14 runs and been out every time; he blotted that record of solid under-achievement in his final match in 1859, however, by scoring an unbeaten 18 from his deserved position at the bottom of the batting order. He did not play again.

Prest graduated from Cambridge University with a Bachelor of Arts degree in 1852 and was called to the bar in 1855. He was a district auditor for the Local Government Board from 1863 to 1900 and lived first at Surbiton and then in Cambridge.

Prest's brother William played cricket for Cambridge University in 1851 and for other amateur teams across the 1850s.
