= John Prest (cricketer) =

English cricketer (1826–1871)

Personal information
- Full name: John Beevor Prest
- Born: 28 May 1826; York, Yorkshire, England
- Died: 15 August 1871 (aged 45); Lincoln, Lincolnshire, England
- Batting: Unknown
- Relatives: William Prest (brother)

Career statistics
Competition	First-class
Matches	2
Runs scored	22
Batting average	11.00
100s/50s	–/–
Top score	12
Catches/stumpings	1/–
- Source: Cricinfo, 7 September 2020

John Beevor Prest (28 May 1826 – 15 August 1871) was an English first-class cricketer.

The son of John and Arabella Prest, he moved with his brother William to Sheffield when their father bought a wine business. There he played first-class cricket for Sheffield (also known as Yorkshire), making two appearances against Manchester in 1852 and 1854, with both matches taking place there. He scored 22 runs in his two matches, with a high score of 12. He died in Lincoln in August 1871.
