= Charles Prest =

English cricketer (1841–1875)

Charles Henry Prest (9 December 1841 – 4 March 1875) was an English amateur cricketer, who played five matches from 1861 to 1870. He appeared for the Gentlemen of the North against the Gentlemen of the South at Trent Bridge in 1861, and for Oxford University versus Southgate at the Magdalen College Ground, Oxford in 1864.

Born in York, England, Prest played two matches for Yorkshire, against Cambridgeshire and Surrey in 1864, and in one final game for Middlesex against Surrey at The Oval in 1870. A right-handed batsman he scored 132 runs at 13.20, with a best of 57 against Southgate.

A prolific scorer in club cricket, he played regularly for the Yorkshire Gentlemen when his other interests allowed. He was also a sprinter of note, and achieved fame as an actor in London under the name 'Mr. Peveril', before turning professional.

Prest died, aged 35, in March 1875 in Gateshead, County Durham, England.

His brother, William Prest, played sixteen matches for Sheffield Cricket Club.
