= Ian Stanger =

Scottish cricketer (born 1971)

Personal information
- Full name: Ian Michael Stanger
- Born: 5 October 1971 (age 55); Glasgow, Scotland
- Batting: Right-handed
- Bowling: Right-arm medium

Career statistics
Competition	ODI	FC	LA
Matches	5	7	77
Runs scored	50	195	840
Batting average	10.00	27.85	17.14
100s/50s	0/0	0/2	0/3
Top score	27	52*	84
Balls bowled	54	444	1,607
Wickets	0	5	24
Bowling average	–	70.60	61.37
5 wickets in innings	–	0	0
10 wickets in match	–	0	0
Best bowling	–	3/57	3/11
Catches/stumpings	2/–	4/–	23/–
- Source: ESPNcricinfo, 23 March 2020

Ian Michael Stanger (born 5 October 1971) is a Scottish cricketer. He is a right-handed batsman and a right-arm medium-pace bowler.

Stanger appeared in four One Day Internationals in the World Cup in May 1999 and one in June 2006. Stanger played List A cricket between 1992 and 2006; and first class cricket between 1997 and 2006. He functioned as an alternate batsman for the Scottish side, neither particularly high up or low down in the batting order, with a high score of 27, and thus he sometimes input with influential innings when given the bat.

After his cricket career, Stanger became a town planner, and also coached cricket teams in Perth, Sydney and Melbourne, Australia.
