= William Prest (Cambridgeshire cricketer) =

English cricketer (1832–1877)

William Pitt Prest (28 May 1832 – 5 November 1877) was an English cricketer who played for Cambridge University, Cambridge Town Club (aka Cambridgeshire) and other amateur teams between 1850 and 1862. He was born at Stapleford, Cambridgeshire and died at East Molesey, Surrey.

Prest was educated at Eton College and for a year only at Gonville and Caius College, Cambridge; he did not remain at Cambridge University and did not take a degree. As a cricketer, he played in the Eton v Harrow match in both 1849 and 1850 and made his first-class debut for a Gentlemen of England team in August 1850, taking four wickets in the game. At Cambridge University in 1851 he had limited success as a bowler and as a batsman, and he was not picked for the University Match against Oxford University. He reappeared for the Gentlemen of England in a single match in 1852, but then disappeared from senior cricket for five years.

In 1852, having left Cambridge, Prest bought himself into the army, joining the 6th Regiment of Foot as an ensign and being promoted the following year to lieutenant. He left the army in 1857 and returned to Cambridge where he played cricket irregularly up to 1862 for the Cambridge Town Club and for the Cambridgeshire team which was at that stage one of the leading county sides.

Prest's brother Edward also played first-class cricket and appeared for Cambridge University in 1850, the year before William did.
