= Damien Fleming =

Australian cricketer and coach

Personal information
- Full name: Damien William Fleming
- Born: 24 April 1970 (age 56); Bentley, Western Australia
- Nickname: Flemo, Bowlologist
- Batting: Right-handed
- Bowling: Right-arm fast-medium
- Role: Bowler

International information
- National side: Australia (1994–2001)
- Test debut (cap 361): 5 October 1994 v Pakistan
- Last Test: 27 February 2001 v India
- ODI debut (cap 115): 16 January 1994 v South Africa
- Last ODI: 21 June 2001 v England
- ODI shirt no.: 17

Domestic team information
- Years: Team
- 1988/89–2001/02: Victoria
- 2002: Warwickshire
- 2002/03: South Australia

Career statistics
Competition	Test	ODI
Matches	20	88
Runs scored	305	152
Batting average	19.06	11.69
100s/50s	0/2	0/0
Top score	71*	29
Balls bowled	4,129	4,619
Wickets	75	134
Bowling average	25.89	25.38
5 wickets in innings	3	1
10 wickets in match	0	0
Best bowling	5/30	5/36
Catches/stumpings	9/–	14/–
Medal record
Men's Cricket
Representing Australia
ICC Cricket World Cup
Winner	1999 England-Wales -Ireland-Scotland-Netherlands
Runner-up	1996 India-Pakistan-Sri Lanka
Commonwealth Games
Silver medal – second place	1998 Kuala Lumpur
- Source: Cricinfo, 12 December 2005

Damien William Fleming (born 24 April 1970) is an Australian cricket commentator and former cricketer who played for the Australian national cricket team and domestic cricket for Victoria and South Australia. He played in 20 Tests and 88 ODIs from 1994 to 2001 and was part of the all-conquering Australian teams under Steve Waugh and Mark Taylor. In recent years Fleming has spent time refining his theory of Bowlology, a set of scientific coaching principles to help developing bowlers. Fleming was a part of the Australian team that won the 1999 Cricket World Cup.

Injury problems shortened his career, with the side-on bowling action that generated his swing, also putting more strain on his body.

== International career ==
Fleming's 20 Tests between 1994–95 and 2000–01 returned 75 wickets at an average of 25.89 with best figures of 5/30. He is one of only three men (along with Maurice Allom and Peter Petherick) to have taken a hat-trick on Test debut. Fleming's hat-trick was taken against Pakistan at Rawalpindi where he claimed Australia's nemesis Salim Malik in the second innings as his third wicket.

His Test match record is impressive, with the 1999–2000 season Fleming's finest hour: he claimed 31 wickets in six Tests against Pakistan and India. His career best figures of 5/31 came against India at Adelaide in December 1999, where if not for Shane Warne dropping a regulation slips catch, Fleming would have claimed a second hat-trick.

Fleming's ODI record is equally impressive, representing his country 88 times including two World Cup finals and taking 134 wickets at an average of 25.38. He was seen by many to be a one-day specialist, especially in the latter overs when his fine economy rate kept runs down. Fleming was the last-over specialist in both the 1996 and 1999 World Cup Semi-Finals. In 1996 at Mohali with the West Indies needing six runs to win off five balls, Fleming bowled Courtney Walsh for victory. In 1999 at Edgbaston, with South Africa requiring one run with four balls remaining, it took an Allan Donald brain-fade to send Australia into the final.

== Domestic career ==
He played 78 First Class Matches for Victoria taking 258 wickets. He took 6/37 on First Class debut vs Western Australia in 1989/90.

Fleming was named in the South Melbourne Cricket Club’s team of the 20th century, alongside such greats as Bill Woodfull, Keith Miller and Clarrie Grimmett.

== Post-retirement ==
Following his retirement from all cricket in 2003, he was briefly appointed head coach at the Australian Cricket Academy.

Like many of his counterparts, Fleming became a cricket commentator for both internationals and domestic Sheffield Shield matches. He has been heard on Triple M Melbourne and SEN 1116 radio, and is a specialist cricket commentator for Seven Network having previously worked for ABC Radio Grandstand, Channel 10 and Fox Sports.

Fleming, a keen Hawthorn fan, appeared on Before the Bounce in 2009 with Jason Dunstall and Danny Frawley, a weekly Australian football program broadcast on Foxtel, before becoming a regular on the show's successor After the Bounce. Recognising his own capacity for sporting insights (developed through deep contemplation of Bowlology theory) the show's producers gave Fleming a role akin to 'editor at large' in his segment Turn It Up. In this segment, Fleming cast a critical eye over the AFL and society in general, raising the questionable and confronting issues that others thought inappropriate. He also ran a part of the show featuring a broken chocolate wheel. No longer in his role on After The Bounce. The chocolate wheel was never seen again.

Fleming began to make appearances during the fourth season (2009) of Thank God You're Here where he parodied the prevalence of sportspersons (notably cricketers) endorsing anything in the Australian media.

In May 2018, it was announced that Fleming would join the Seven Network's cricket commentary team, after the network won the Cricket Australia broadcast rights from the 2018/19 season. In August 2018 it was announced that he would also join the SEN 1116 radio commentary team. In 2025 he appeared as a contestant on Claire Hooper's House Of Games.
