= 1999 Cricket World Cup =

Seventh edition of the Cricket World Cup

1999 ICC Cricket World Cup
- Dates: 14 May – 20 June 1999
- Administrator: International Cricket Council
- Cricket format: One Day International
- Tournament format(s): Round robin and Knockout
- Hosts: England; Wales; Scotland; Ireland; Netherlands
- Champions: Australia (2nd title)
- Runners-up: Pakistan
- Participants: 12
- Matches: 42
- Player of the series: (South Africa) Lance Klusener
- Most runs: (India) Rahul Dravid (461)
- Most wickets: (New Zealand) Geoff Allott (20) (Australia) Shane Warne (20)

The 1999 ICC Cricket World Cup, also branded as England '99, was the seventh edition of the Cricket World Cup, organised by the International Cricket Council (ICC). It was hosted primarily by England, with selected matches also played in Wales, Scotland, Ireland and the Netherlands. The tournament was won by Australia, who beat Pakistan by 8 wickets in the final at Lord's in London.

The tournament was hosted three years after the previous Cricket World Cup, deviating from the usual four-year gap.

== Format ==
It featured 12 teams, playing a total of 42 matches. In the group stage, the teams were divided into two groups of six; each team played all the others in their group once. The top three teams from each group advanced to the Super Sixes, a new concept for the 1999 World Cup; each team carried forward the points from the games against the other qualifiers from their group and then played each of the qualifiers from the other group (in other words, each qualifier from Group A played each qualifier from Group B and vice versa). The top four teams in the Super Sixes advanced to the semi-finals.

== Qualification ==
The eight teams which participated in the tournament. Qualified as host Qualified as full member of ICC Qualified via the 1997 ICC Trophy Participated in the ICC Trophy but failed to qualify

The 1999 World Cup featured 12 teams, which was the same as the previous edition in 1996. The hosts England and the eight other test nations earned automatic qualification to the World Cup. The remaining three spots were decided at the 1997 ICC Trophy in Malaysia.

22 nations competed in the 1997 edition of the ICC Trophy. After going through two group stages, the semi-finals saw Kenya and Bangladesh qualify through to the World Cup. Scotland would be the third nation to qualify as they defeated Ireland in the third-place playoff.

Team	Method of qualification	Finals appearances	Last appearance	Previous best performance	Group
England	Hosts	7th	1996	Runners-up (1979, 1987, 1992)	A
Australia	Full member	7th	1996	Champions (1987)	B
India	Full member	7th	1996	Champions (1983)	A
New Zealand	Full member	7th	1996	Semi-finals (1975, 1979, 1992)	B
Pakistan	Full member	7th	1996	Champions (1992)	B
South Africa	Full member	3rd	1996	Semi-finals (1992)	A
Sri Lanka	Full member	7th	1996	Champions (1996)	A
West Indies	Full member	7th	1996	Champions (1975, 1979)	B
Zimbabwe	Full member	5th	1996	Group stage (All)	A
Bangladesh	1997 ICC Trophy winner	1st	—	Debut	B
Kenya	1997 ICC Trophy runner-up	2nd	1996	Group stage (1996)	A
Scotland	1997 ICC Trophy third place	1st	—	Debut	B

== Venues ==
Venues in England

=== England ===
Venue	City	Capacity	Matches
Edgbaston Cricket Ground	Birmingham, West Midlands	21,000	3
County Cricket Ground	Bristol	8,000	2
St Lawrence Ground	Canterbury, Kent	15,000	1
County Cricket Ground	Chelmsford, Essex	6,500	2
Riverside Ground	Chester-le-Street, County Durham	15,000	2
County Cricket Ground	Derby, Derbyshire	9,500	1
County Cricket Ground	Hove, Sussex	7,000	1
Headingley	Leeds, West Yorkshire	17,500	3
Grace Road	Leicester, Leicestershire	12,000	2
Lord's	London, Greater London	28,000	3
The Oval	London, Greater London	25,500	3
Old Trafford	Manchester, Greater Manchester	22,000	3
County Cricket Ground	Northampton, Northamptonshire	6,500	2
Trent Bridge	Nottingham, Nottinghamshire	17,500	3
County Cricket Ground	Southampton, Hampshire	6,500	2
County Cricket Ground	Taunton, Somerset	6,500	2
New Road	Worcester, Worcestershire	4,500	2

=== Outside England ===
Scotland played two of their Group B matches in their home country becoming the first associate nation to host games in a World Cup. One Group B match was played in Wales and Ireland respectively, while one Group A match was played in the Netherlands.

Venue	City	Capacity	Matches
Sophia Gardens	Cardiff, Wales	15,653	1
The Grange Club	Edinburgh, Scotland	3,000	2
Clontarf Cricket Club Ground	Dublin, Ireland	3,200	1
VRA Cricket Ground	Amstelveen, Netherlands	4,500	1
Venues in Wales, Scotland and Ireland		Venues in the Netherlands	

== Group stage ==
=== Pool A ===
Pos	Team	Pld	W	L	NR	T	NRR	Pts	PCF
1	South Africa	5	4	1	0	0	0.86	8	2
2	India	5	3	2	0	0	1.28	6	0
3	Zimbabwe	5	3	2	0	0	0.02	6	4
4	England	5	3	2	0	0	−0.33	6	N/A
5	Sri Lanka	5	2	3	0	0	−0.81	4	N/A
6	Kenya	5	0	5	0	0	−1.20	0	N/A

14 May 1999
Scorecard

Sri Lanka; 204 (48.4 overs)	v	England; 207/2 (46.5 overs)
Romesh Kaluwitharana 57 (66); Alan Mullally 4/37 (10 overs)		Alec Stewart 88 (146); Chaminda Vaas 1/27 (10 overs)

England won by 8 wickets
Lord's, London
Umpires: Rudi Koertzen (SA) and Srinivasaraghavan Venkataraghavan (Ind)
Player of the match: Alec Stewart (Eng)

- England won the toss and elected to field.

15 May 1999
Scorecard

India; 253/5 (50 overs)	v	South Africa; 254/6 (47.2 overs)
Sourav Ganguly 97 (142); Lance Klusener 3/66 (10 overs)		Jacques Kallis 96 (128); Javagal Srinath 2/69 (10 overs)

South Africa won by 4 wickets
New County Ground, Hove
Umpires: Steve Bucknor (WI) and David Shepherd (Eng)
Player of the match: Jacques Kallis (SA)

- India won the toss and elected to bat.

15 May 1999
Scorecard

Kenya; 229/7 (50 overs)	v	Zimbabwe; 231/5 (41 overs)
Alpesh Vadher 54 (90); Neil Johnson 4/42 (10 overs)		Neil Johnson 59 (70); Maurice Odumbe 2/39 (7 overs)

Zimbabwe won by 5 wickets
County Ground, Taunton
Umpires: Doug Cowie (NZ) and Javed Akhtar (Pak)
Player of the match: Neil Johnson (Zim)

- Zimbabwe won the toss and elected to field.
- Jimmy Kamande (Ken) made his ODI debut.

18 May 1999
Scorecard

Kenya; 203 (49.4 overs)	v	England; 204/1 (39 overs)
Steve Tikolo 71 (141); Darren Gough 4/34 (10 overs)		Nasser Hussain 88* (127); Thomas Odoyo 1/65 (10 overs)

England won by 9 wickets
St Lawrence Ground, Canterbury
Umpires: K. T. Francis (SL) and Rudi Koertzen (SA)
Player of the match: Steve Tikolo (Ken)

- England won the toss and elected to field.

19 May 1999
Scorecard

Zimbabwe; 252/9 (50 overs)	v	India; 249 (45 overs)
Andy Flower 68* (85); Javagal Srinath 2/35 (10 overs)		Sadagoppan Ramesh 55 (77); Henry Olonga 3/22 (4 overs)

Zimbabwe won by 3 runs
Grace Road, Leicester
Umpires: Dave Orchard (SA) and Peter Willey (Eng)
Player of the match: Grant Flower (Zim)

- India won the toss and elected to field.
- India were fined four overs for a slow over rate in the first innings.

19 May 1999
Scorecard

South Africa; 199/9 (50 overs)	v	Sri Lanka; 110 (35.2 overs)
Lance Klusener 52* (45); Muttiah Muralitharan 3/25 (10 overs)		Roshan Mahanama 36 (71); Lance Klusener 3/21 (5.2 overs)

South Africa won by 89 runs
County Ground, Northampton
Umpires: Steve Bucknor (WI) and Steve Dunne (NZ)
Player of the match: Lance Klusener (SA)

- Sri Lanka won the toss and elected to field.

22 May 1999
Scorecard

South Africa; 225/7 (50 overs)	v	England; 103 (41 overs)
Herschelle Gibbs 60 (99); Alan Mullally 2/28 (10 overs)		Neil Fairbrother 21 (44); Allan Donald 4/17 (8 overs)

South Africa won by 122 runs
The Oval, London
Umpires: Steve Dunne (NZ) and Srinivasaraghavan Venkataraghavan (Ind)
Player of the match: Lance Klusener (SA)

- England won the toss and elected to field.

22 May 1999
Scorecard

Zimbabwe; 197/9 (50 overs)	v	Sri Lanka; 198/6 (46 overs)
Grant Flower 42 (69); Pramodya Wickramasinghe 3/30 (10 overs)		Marvan Atapattu 54 (90); Guy Whittall 3/35 (10 overs)

Sri Lanka won by 4 wickets
New Road, Worcester
Umpires: Steve Bucknor (WI) and David Shepherd (Eng)
Player of the match: Marvan Atapattu (SL)

- Sri Lanka won the toss and elected to field.

23 May 1999
Scorecard

India; 329/2 (50 overs)	v	Kenya; 235/7 (50 overs)
Sachin Tendulkar 140 (101); Martin Suji 1/26 (10 overs)		Steve Tikolo 58 (75); Debashish Mohanty 4/56 (10 overs)

India won by 94 runs
County Ground, Bristol
Umpires: Doug Cowie (NZ) and Ian Robinson (Zim)
Player of the match: Sachin Tendulkar (Ind)

- Kenya won the toss and elected to field.

25 May 1999
Scorecard

Zimbabwe; 167/8 (50 overs)	v	England; 168/3 (38.3 overs)
Grant Flower 35 (90); Alan Mullally 2/16 (10 overs)		Graham Thorpe 62 (80); Mpumelelo Mbangwa 2/28 (7 overs)

England won by 7 wickets
Trent Bridge, Nottingham
Umpires: Steve Bucknor (WI) and Darrell Hair (Aus)
Player of the match: Alan Mullally (Eng)

- England won the toss and elected to field.

26 May 1999
Scorecard

Kenya; 152 (44.3 overs)	v	South Africa; 153/3 (41 overs)
Ravindu Shah 50 (64); Lance Klusener 5/21 (8.3 overs)		Jacques Kallis 44* (81); Maurice Odumbe 1/15 (7 overs)

South Africa won by 7 wickets
VRA Ground, Amstelveen
Umpires: Doug Cowie (NZ) and Peter Willey (Eng)
Player of the match: Lance Klusener (SA)

- South Africa won the toss and elected to field.
- South Africa qualified for Super Sixes stage. Kenya eliminated.

26 May 1999
Scorecard

India; 373/6 (50 overs)	v	Sri Lanka; 216 (42.3 overs)
Sourav Ganguly 183 (158); Pramodya Wickramasinghe 3/65 (10 overs)		Aravinda de Silva 56 (74); Robin Singh 5/31 (9.3 overs)

India won by 157 runs
County Ground, Taunton
Umpires: Steve Dunne (NZ) and David Shepherd (Eng)
Player of the match: Sourav Ganguly (Ind)

- Sri Lanka won the toss and elected to field.

29 May 1999
Scorecard

Zimbabwe; 233/6 (50 overs)	v	South Africa; 185 (47.2 overs)
Neil Johnson 76 (117); Allan Donald 3/41 (10 overs)		Lance Klusener 52* (58); Neil Johnson 3/27 (8 overs)

Zimbabwe won by 48 runs
County Ground, Chelmsford
Umpires: David Shepherd (Eng) and Srinivasaraghavan Venkataraghavan (Ind)
Player of the match: Neil Johnson (Zim)

- Zimbabwe won the toss and elected to bat.
- Sri Lanka were eliminated

29–30 May 1999
Scorecard

India; 232/8 (50 overs)	v	England; 169 (45.2 overs)
Rahul Dravid 53 (82); Mark Ealham 2/28 (10 overs)		Graham Thorpe 36 (57); Sourav Ganguly 3/27 (8 overs)

India won by 63 runs
Edgbaston, Birmingham
Umpires: Darrell Hair (Aus) and Javed Akhtar (Pak)
Player of the match: Sourav Ganguly (Ind)

- England won the toss and elected to field.
- India and Zimbabwe qualified for Super Sixes stage of tournament and England were eliminated.

30 May 1999
Scorecard

Sri Lanka; 275/8 (50 overs)	v	Kenya; 230/6 (50 overs)
Marvan Atapattu 52 (67); Thomas Odoyo 3/56 (10 overs)		Maurice Odumbe 82 (95); Chaminda Vaas 2/26 (7 overs)

Sri Lanka won by 45 runs
County Ground, Southampton
Umpires: Dave Orchard (SA) and Peter Willey (Eng)
Player of the match: Maurice Odumbe (Ken)

- Kenya won the toss and elected to field.

=== Pool B ===
Pos	Team	Pld	W	L	NR	T	NRR	Pts	PCF
1	Pakistan	5	4	1	0	0	0.51	8	4
2	Australia	5	3	2	0	0	0.73	6	0
3	New Zealand	5	3	2	0	0	0.58	6	2
4	West Indies	5	3	2	0	0	0.50	6	N/A
5	Bangladesh	5	2	3	0	0	−0.52	4	N/A
6	Scotland	5	0	5	0	0	−1.93	0	N/A

16 May 1999
Scorecard

Scotland; 181/7 (50 overs)	v	Australia; 182/4 (44.5 overs)
Gavin Hamilton 34 (42); Shane Warne 3/39 (10 overs)		Mark Waugh 67 (114); Nick Dyer 2/43 (10 overs)

Australia won by 6 wickets
New Road, Worcester
Umpires: Steve Dunne (NZ) and Peter Willey (Eng)
Player of the match: Mark Waugh (Aus)

- Australia won the toss and elected to field.

16 May 1999
Scorecard

Pakistan; 229/8 (50 overs)	v	West Indies; 202 (48.5 overs)
Wasim Akram 43 (29); Courtney Walsh 3/28 (10 overs)		Shivnarine Chanderpaul 77 (96); Abdul Razzaq 3/32 (10 overs)

Pakistan won by 27 runs
County Ground, Bristol
Umpires: Darrell Hair (Aus) and Dave Orchard (SA)
Player of the match: Azhar Mahmood (Pak)

- Pakistan won the toss and elected to bat.
- Ricardo Powell (WI) made his ODI debut.
- Keith Arthurton played his final ODI game.

17 May 1999
Scorecard

Bangladesh; 116 (37.4 overs)	v	New Zealand; 117/4 (33 overs)
Enamul Haque 19 (41); Chris Cairns 3/19 (7 overs)		Matt Horne 35 (86); Naimur Rahman 1/5 (2 overs)

New Zealand won by 6 wickets
County Ground, Chelmsford
Umpires: Ian Robinson (Zim) and Srinivasaraghavan Venkataraghavan (Ind)
Player of the match: Gavin Larsen (NZ)

- New Zealand won the toss and elected to field.

20 May 1999
Scorecard

Australia; 213/8 (50 overs)	v	New Zealand; 214/5 (45.2 overs)
Darren Lehmann 76 (94); Geoff Allott 4/37 (10 overs)		Roger Twose 80* (99); Damien Fleming 2/43 (8.2 overs)

New Zealand won by 5 wickets
Sophia Gardens, Cardiff
Umpires: Javed Akhtar (Pak) and David Shepherd (Eng)
Player of the match: Roger Twose (NZ)

- Australia won the toss and elected to bat.

20 May 1999
Scorecard

Pakistan; 261/6 (50 overs)	v	Scotland; 167 (38.5 overs)
Yousuf Youhana 81* (119); Gavin Hamilton 2/36 (10 overs)		Gavin Hamilton 76 (111); Shoaib Akhtar 3/11 (6 overs)

Pakistan won by 94 runs
Riverside Ground, Chester-le-Street
Umpires: Doug Cowie (NZ) and Ian Robinson (Zim)
Player of the match: Yousuf Youhana (Pak)

- Scotland won the toss and elected to field.
- Ian Stanger (Sco) made his ODI debut.
- Scotland conceded 59 extras, the joint highest in an ODI.

21 May 1999
Scorecard

Bangladesh; 182 (49.2 overs)	v	West Indies; 183/3 (46.3 overs)
Mehrab Hossain 64 (129); Courtney Walsh 4/25 (10 overs)		Jimmy Adams 53* (82); Minhajul Abedin 1/28 (7 overs)

West Indies won by 7 wickets
Clontarf Cricket Club Ground, Dublin
Umpires: KT Francis (SL) and Darrell Hair (Aus)
Player of the match: Courtney Walsh (WI)

- Bangladesh won the toss and elected to bat.

23 May 1999
Scorecard

Pakistan; 275/8 (50 overs)	v	Australia; 265 (49.5 overs)
Inzamam-ul-Haq 81 (104); Damien Fleming 2/37 (10 overs)		Michael Bevan 61 (80); Wasim Akram 4/40 (9.5 overs)

Pakistan won by 10 runs
Headingley, Leeds
Umpires: Rudi Koertzen (SA) and Peter Willey (Eng)
Player of the match: Inzamam-ul-Haq (Pak)

- Australia won the toss and elected to field.

24 May 1999
Scorecard

Bangladesh; 185/9 (50 overs)	v	Scotland; 163 (46.2 overs)
Minhajul Abedin 68* (116); John Blain 4/37 (10 overs)		Gavin Hamilton 63 (71); Hasibul Hossain 2/26 (8 overs)

Bangladesh won by 22 runs
Grange Cricket Club Ground, Edinburgh
Umpires: K. T. Francis (SL) and Dave Orchard (SA)
Player of the match: Minhajul Abedin (Ban)

- Scotland won the toss and elected to field.

24 May 1999
Scorecard

New Zealand; 156 (48.1 overs)	v	West Indies; 158/3 (44.2 overs)
Craig McMillan 32 (78); Mervyn Dillon 4/46 (9.1 overs)		Ridley Jacobs 80* (131); Chris Harris 1/19 (8 overs)

West Indies won by 7 wickets
County Ground, Southampton
Umpires: Javed Akhtar (Pak) and Srinivasaraghavan Venkataraghavan (Ind)
Player of the match: Ridley Jacobs (WI)

- West Indies won the toss and elected to field.

27 May 1999
Scorecard

Bangladesh; 178/7 (50 overs)	v	Australia; 181/3 (19.5 overs)
Minhajul Abedin 53* (99); Tom Moody 3/25 (10 overs)		Adam Gilchrist 63 (39); Enamul Haque 2/40 (5 overs)

Australia won by 7 wickets
Riverside Ground, Chester-le-Street
Umpires: Steve Bucknor (WI) and Dave Orchard (SA)
Player of the match: Tom Moody (Aus)

- Australia won the toss and elected to field.

27 May 1999
Scorecard

Scotland; 68 (31.3 overs)	v	West Indies; 70/2 (10.1 overs)
Gavin Hamilton 24* (82); Courtney Walsh 3/7 (7 overs)		Shivnarine Chanderpaul 30* (30); John Blain 2/36 (5.1 overs)

West Indies won by 8 wickets
Grace Road, Leicester
Umpires: Javed Akhtar (Pak) and Ian Robinson (Zim)
Player of the match: Courtney Walsh (WI)

- Scotland won the toss and elected to bat.
- Greig Williamson (Sco) made his ODI debut.
- Scotland were eliminated as a result of this match.

28 May 1999
Scorecard

Pakistan; 269/8 (50 overs)	v	New Zealand; 207/8 (50 overs)
Inzamam-ul-Haq 73* (61); Geoff Allott 4/64 (10 overs)		Stephen Fleming 69 (100); Azhar Mahmood 3/38 (10 overs)

Pakistan won by 62 runs
County Ground, Derby
Umpires: K. T. Francis (SL) and Rudi Koertzen (SA)
Player of the match: Inzamam-ul-Haq (Pak)

- New Zealand won the toss and elected to field.
- Pakistan qualified for Super Six stage.

30 May 1999
Scorecard

West Indies; 110 (46.4 overs)	v	Australia; 111/4 (40.4 overs)
Ridley Jacobs 49* (142); Glenn McGrath 5/14 (8.4 overs)		Adam Gilchrist 21 (36); Curtly Ambrose 3/31 (10 overs)

Australia won by 6 wickets
Old Trafford, Manchester
Umpires: Steve Dunne (NZ) and K. T. Francis (SL)
Player of the match: Glenn McGrath (Aus)

- Australia won the toss and elected to field.
- Australia needed to score 111 within 47.2 overs to qualify for the Super Six stage of the tournament. Australia qualified for the Super Sixes and Bangladesh were eliminated.
- Ridley Jacobs (WI) became the first cricketer to carry his bat in a World Cup match.
- Phil Simmons played his last ODI game.
- Brendon Julian played his last ODI game.

31 May 1999
Scorecard

Bangladesh; 223/9 (50 overs)	v	Pakistan; 161 (44.3 overs)
Akram Khan 42 (66); Saqlain Mushtaq 5/35 (10 overs)		Wasim Akram 29 (52); Khaled Mahmud 3/31 (10 overs)

Bangladesh won by 62 runs
County Ground, Northampton
Umpires: Doug Cowie (NZ) and Darrell Hair (Aus)
Player of the match: Khaled Mahmud (Ban)

- Pakistan won the toss and elected to field.

31 May 1999
Scorecard

Scotland; 121 (42.1 overs)	v	New Zealand; 123/4 (17.5 overs)
Ian Stanger 27 (58); Chris Harris 4/7 (3.1 overs)		Roger Twose 54* (49); John Blain 3/53 (7 overs)

New Zealand won by 6 wickets
Grange Cricket Club Ground, Edinburgh
Umpires: Rudi Koertzen (SA) and Ian Robinson (Zim)
Player of the match: Geoff Allott (NZ)

- New Zealand won the toss and elected to field.
- New Zealand needed to score 122 within 21.2 overs to qualify for Super Sixes stage. New Zealand qualified for Super Sixes and West Indies were eliminated.

== Super Six ==
Teams who qualified for the Super Six stage only played against the teams from the other group; results against the other teams from the same group were carried forward to this stage. Results against the non-qualifying teams were therefore discarded at this point.

As a result of League match losses against New Zealand and Pakistan, even though Australia finished second in their group, they progressed to the Super Six stage with no points carried forward (PCF). India faced similar circumstances, finishing 2nd in their group but carrying forward 0 points after losing to fellow qualifiers Zimbabwe and South Africa.

During their super six clash, Pakistan and India were officially at war at the time of their match, the only time this has ever happened in the history of the sport.

Points carried forward (PCF)
Results	Against qualified teams
Win	2 points
No result / tie	1 points
Loss	0 point

Pos	Team	Pld	W	L	NR	T	NRR	Pts	PCF
1	Pakistan	5	3	2	0	0	0.65	6	4
2	Australia	5	3	2	0	0	0.36	6	0
3	South Africa	5	3	2	0	0	0.17	6	2
4	New Zealand	5	2	2	1	0	−0.52	5	2
5	Zimbabwe	5	2	2	1	0	−0.79	5	4
6	India	5	1	4	0	0	−0.15	2	0
	Source: Cricinfo								

4 June 1999
Scorecard

Australia; 282/6 (50 overs)	v	India; 205 (48.2 overs)
Mark Waugh 83 (99); Robin Singh 2/43 (7 overs)		Ajay Jadeja 100* (138); Glenn McGrath 3/34 (10 overs)

Australia won by 77 runs
The Oval, London
Umpires: Steve Bucknor (WI) and Peter Willey (Eng)
Player of the match: Glenn McGrath (Aus)

- India won the toss and elected to field.

5 June 1999
Scorecard

Pakistan; 220/7 (50 overs)	v	South Africa; 221/7 (49 overs)
Moin Khan 63 (56); Steve Elworthy 2/23 (10 overs)		Jacques Kallis 54 (98); Azhar Mahmood 3/24 (10 overs)

South Africa won by 3 wickets
Trent Bridge, Nottingham
Umpires: Darrell Hair (Aus) and David Shepherd (Eng)
Player of the match: Lance Klusener (SA)

- Pakistan won the toss and elected to bat.

6–7 June 1999
Scorecard

Zimbabwe; 175 (49.3 overs)	v	New Zealand; 70/3 (15 overs)
Murray Goodwin 57 (90); Chris Cairns 3/24 (6.3 overs)		Matt Horne 35 (35); Guy Whittall 1/9 (3 overs)

No result
Headingley, Leeds
Umpires: Dave Orchard (SA) and Srinivasaraghavan Venkataraghavan (Ind)

- Zimbabwe won the toss and elected to bat.
- Rain interrupted play . No play was possible on reserve day for rain.

8 June 1999
Scorecard

India; 227/6 (50 overs)	v	Pakistan; 180 (45.3 overs)
Rahul Dravid 61 (89); Wasim Akram 2/27 (10 overs)		Inzamam-ul-Haq 41 (93); Venkatesh Prasad 5/27 (9.3 overs)

India won by 47 runs
Old Trafford, Manchester
Umpires: Steve Bucknor (WI) and David Shepherd (Eng)
Player of the match: Venkatesh Prasad (Ind)

- India won the toss and elected to bat.
- This was the first and only time two nations played at the world cup while officially at war.

9 June 1999
Scorecard

Australia; 303/4 (50 overs)	v	Zimbabwe; 259/6 (50 overs)
Mark Waugh 104 (120); Neil Johnson 2/43 (8 overs)		Neil Johnson 132* (144); Paul Reiffel 3/55 (10 overs)

Australia won by 44 runs
Lord's, London
Umpires: Doug Cowie (NZ) and Rudi Koertzen (SA)
Player of the match: Neil Johnson (Zim)

- Zimbabwe won the toss and elected to field.

10 June 1999
Scorecard

South Africa; 287/5 (50 overs)	v	New Zealand; 213/8 (50 overs)
Herschelle Gibbs 91 (118); Nathan Astle 1/29 (6 overs)		Stephen Fleming 42 (64); Jacques Kallis 2/15 (6 overs)

South Africa won by 74 runs
Edgbaston, Birmingham
Umpires: Ian Robinson (Zim) and Srinivasaraghavan Venkataraghavan (Ind)
Player of the match: Jacques Kallis (SA)

- South Africa won the toss and elected to bat.
- South Africa qualified for the semi-finals.

11 June 1999
Scorecard

Pakistan; 271/9 (50 overs)	v	Zimbabwe; 123 (40.3 overs)
Saeed Anwar 103 (144); Henry Olonga 2/38 (5 overs)		Neil Johnson 54 (94); Saqlain Mushtaq 3/16 (6.3 overs)

Pakistan won by 148 runs
The Oval, London
Umpires: Steve Bucknor (WI) and Dave Orchard (SA)
Player of the match: Saeed Anwar (Pak)

- Pakistan won the toss and elected to bat.
- Pakistan qualified for the semi-finals.
- Saqlain Mushtaq (Pak) became the second bowler to take a hat-trick in a World Cup match.

12 June 1999
Scorecard

India; 251/6 (50 overs)	v	New Zealand; 253/5 (48.2 overs)
Ajay Jadeja 76 (103); Chris Cairns 2/44 (10 overs)		Matt Horne 74 (116); Debashish Mohanty 2/41 (10 overs)

New Zealand won by 5 wickets
Trent Bridge, Nottingham
Umpires: Darrell Hair (Aus) and David Shepherd (Eng)
Player of the match: Roger Twose (NZ)

- India won the toss and elected to bat.
- New Zealand qualified for the semi-finals and India were eliminated.

13 June 1999
Scorecard

South Africa; 271/7 (50 overs)	v	Australia; 272/5 (49.4 overs)
Herschelle Gibbs 101 (134); Damien Fleming 3/57 (10 overs)		Steve Waugh 120* (110); Steve Elworthy 2/46 (10 overs)

Australia won by 5 wickets
Headingley, Leeds
Umpires: Srinivasaraghavan Venkataraghavan (Ind) and Peter Willey (Eng)
Player of the match: Steve Waugh (Aus)

- South Africa won the toss and elected to bat.
- Australia qualified for the semi-finals and Zimbabwe were eliminated.

== Semi-finals ==
Semi-finals
16 June – Old Trafford, Manchester
New Zealand	241/7
Pakistan	242/1
17 June – Edgbaston, Birmingham
Australia	213
South Africa	213

Final
20 June – Lord's, London
Pakistan	132
Australia	133/2

- Australia progressed to the final because they finished higher in the Super Six table than South Africa due to having won their head to head Super Six match.

16 June 1999
Scorecard

New Zealand; 241/7 (50 overs)	v	Pakistan; 242/1 (47.3 overs)
Roger Twose 46 (83); Shoaib Akhtar 3/55 (10 overs)		Saeed Anwar 113* (148); Chris Cairns 1/33 (8 overs)

Pakistan won by 9 wickets
Old Trafford, Manchester
Umpires: Darrell Hair (Aus) and Peter Willey (Eng)
Player of the match: Shoaib Akhtar (Pak)

- New Zealand won the toss and elected to bat.
- Pakistan qualified for the final for second time after 1992.

17 June 1999
Scorecard

Australia; 213 (49.2 overs)	v	South Africa; 213 (49.4 overs)
Michael Bevan 65 (101); Shaun Pollock 5/36 (9.2 overs)		Jacques Kallis 53 (92); Shane Warne 4/29 (10 overs)

Match tied
Edgbaston, Birmingham
Umpires: David Shepherd (Eng) and Srinivasaraghavan Venkataraghavan (Ind)
Player of the match: Shane Warne (Aus)

- South Africa won the toss and elected to field.
- Australia progressed to the final because they finished higher in the Super Six table than South Africa due to having won their head to head Super Six match.
- Australia qualified for the final for fourth time after 1975, 1987 and 1996.

== Final ==
20 June 1999
Scorecard

Pakistan; 132 (39 overs)	v	Australia; 133/2 (20.1 overs)
Ijaz Ahmed 22 (46); Shane Warne 4/33 (9 overs)		Adam Gilchrist 54 (36); Saqlain Mushtaq 1/21 (4.1 overs)

Australia won by 8 wickets
Lord's, London
Umpires: Steve Bucknor (WI) and David Shepherd (Eng)
Player of the match: Shane Warne (Aus)

- Pakistan won the toss and elected to bat.
- Paul Reiffel (Aus) played his final international match.

== Statistics ==
Leading run scorers
Runs	Player	Country
461	Rahul Dravid	India
398	Steve Waugh	Australia
379	Sourav Ganguly	India
375	Mark Waugh	Australia
368	Saeed Anwar	Pakistan

Leading wicket takers
Wickets	Player	Country
20	Geoff Allott	New Zealand
20	Shane Warne	Australia
18	Glenn McGrath	Australia
17	Lance Klusener	South Africa
17	Saqlain Mushtaq	Pakistan

== Match balls ==
A new type of cricket ball, the white 'Duke', was introduced for the first time in the 1999 World Cup. British Cricket Balls Ltd claimed that the balls behaved identically to the balls used in previous World Cups, experiments showed they were harder and swung more.

== Media ==
The host broadcasters for television coverage of the tournament were Sky and BBC Television. In the UK, live games were divided between the broadcasters, with both screening the final live. This was to be BBC's last live cricket coverage during that summer, with all of England's home Test series being shown on Channel 4 or Sky from 1999 onwards; the BBC did not show any live cricket again until August 2020.
