= International cricket in 1995–96 =

International cricket season

The 1995–1996 international cricket season was from September 1995 to April 1996.

== Season overview ==
International tours
Start date	Home team	Away team	Results [Matches]			
Start date	Home team	Away team	Test	ODI	FC	LA
8 September 1995	Pakistan	Sri Lanka	1–2 [3]	1–2 [3]	—	—
13 October 1995	Zimbabwe	South Africa	0–1 [1]	0–2 [2]	—	—
18 October 1995	India	New Zealand	1–0 [3]	3–2 [5]	—	—
9 November 1995	Australia	Pakistan	2–1 [3]	—	—	—
16 November 1995	South Africa	England	1–0 [5]	6–1 [7]	—	—
8 December 1995	New Zealand	Pakistan	0–1 [1]	2–2 [4]	—	—
8 December 1995	Australia	Sri Lanka	3–0 [3]	—	—	—
13 January 1996	New Zealand	Zimbabwe	0–0 [2]	2–1 [3]	—	—
8 February 1996	West Indies	Sri Lanka	—	0–1 [1]	—	—
26 March 1996	West Indies	New Zealand	1–0 [2]	3–2 [5]	—	—
International tournaments
Start date	Tournament				Winners	
11 October 1995	(United Arab Emirates) 1995–96 Singer Champions Trophy				Sri Lanka	
15 December 1995	(Australia) 1995–96 Australian Tri-Series				Australia	
14 February 1996	(India) (Pakistan) (Sri Lanka) 1995–96 Wills World Cup				Sri Lanka	
1 April 1996	(Singapore) 1995–96 Singer Cup				Pakistan	
12 April 1996	(United Arab Emirates) 1995-96 Pepsi Sharjah Cup				South Africa	

== September ==
=== Sri Lanka in Pakistan ===
Test series
No.	Date	Home captain	Away captain	Venue	Result
Test 1304	8–11 September	Rameez Raja	Arjuna Ranatunga	Arbab Niaz Stadium, Peshawar	Pakistan by an innings and 40 runs
Test 1305	15–19 September	Rameez Raja	Arjuna Ranatunga	Iqbal Stadium, Faisalabad	Sri Lanka by 42 runs
Test 1306	22–26 September	Rameez Raja	Arjuna Ranatunga	Jinnah Stadium, Sialkot	Sri Lanka by 144 runs
ODI series
No.	Date	Home captain	Away captain	Venue	Result
ODI 1003	29 September	Rameez Raja	Arjuna Ranatunga	Jinnah Stadium, Gujranwala	Pakistan by 9 wickets
ODI 1004	1 October	Rameez Raja	Arjuna Ranatunga	Iqbal Stadium, Faisalabad	Sri Lanka by 49 runs
ODI 1005	3 October	Rameez Raja	Arjuna Ranatunga	Rawalpindi Cricket Stadium, Rawalpindi	Sri Lanka by 4 wickets

== October ==
=== Singer Champions Trophy 1995-96 ===
Team	P	W	L	T	NR	RR	Points
West Indies	4	2	2	0	0	5.196	4
Sri Lanka	4	2	2	0	0	5.056	4
Pakistan	4	2	2	0	0	4.215	4

Group stage
No.	Date	Team 1	Captain 1	Team 2	Captain 2	Venue	Result
ODI 1006	11 October	Sri Lanka	Arjuna Ranatunga	West Indies	Richie Richardson	Sharjah Cricket Stadium, Sharjah	Sri Lanka by 6 runs
ODI 1007	12 October	Pakistan	Rameez Raja	Sri Lanka	Arjuna Ranatunga	Sharjah Cricket Stadium, Sharjah	Pakistan by 82 runs
ODI 1008	13 October	Pakistan	Rameez Raja	West Indies	Richie Richardson	Sharjah Cricket Stadium, Sharjah	Pakistan by 15 runs
ODI 1009	15 October	Pakistan	Rameez Raja	West Indies	Richie Richardson	Sharjah Cricket Stadium, Sharjah	West Indies by 4 wickets
ODI 1010	16 October	Sri Lanka	Arjuna Ranatunga	West Indies	Richie Richardson	Sharjah Cricket Stadium, Sharjah	West Indies by 4 runs
ODI 1011	17 October	Pakistan	Rameez Raja	Sri Lanka	Arjuna Ranatunga	Sharjah Cricket Stadium, Sharjah	Sri Lanka by 8 wickets
Final
No.	Date	Team 1	Captain 1	Team 2	Captain 2	Venue	Result
ODI 1012	20 October	Sri Lanka	Arjuna Ranatunga	West Indies	Richie Richardson	Sharjah Cricket Stadium, Sharjah	Sri Lanka by 50 runs

=== South Africa in Zimbabwe ===
One-off Test
No.	Date	Home captain	Away captain	Venue	Result
Test 1307	13–16 October	Andy Flower	Hansie Cronje	Harare Sports Club, Harare	South Africa by 7 wickets
ODI Series
No.	Date	Home captain	Away captain	Venue	Result
ODI 1013	21 October	Andy Flower	Hansie Cronje	Harare Sports Club, Harare	South Africa by 134 runs
ODI 1014	22 October	Andy Flower	Hansie Cronje	Harare Sports Club, Harare	South Africa by 112 runs

=== New Zealand in India ===
Test series
No.	Date	Home captain	Away captain	Venue	Result
Test 1308	18–20 October	Mohammad Azharuddin	Lee Germon	M. Chinnaswamy Stadium, Bangalore	India by 8 wickets
Test 1309	25–29 October	Mohammad Azharuddin	Lee Germon	MA Chidambaram Stadium, Chennai	Match drawn
Test 1310	8–12 November	Mohammad Azharuddin	Lee Germon	Barabati Stadium, Cuttack	Match drawn
ODI series
No.	Date	Home captain	Away captain	Venue	Result
ODI 1015	15 November	Mohammad Azharuddin	Lee Germon	Keenan Stadium, Jamshedpur	New Zealand by 8 wickets
ODI 1016	18 November	Mohammad Azharuddin	Lee Germon	Gandhi Sports Complex Ground, Amritsar	India by 6 wickets
ODI 1016a	21 November	Mohammad Azharuddin	Lee Germon	Nehru Stadium, Margao	Match abandoned
ODI 1017	24 November	Mohammad Azharuddin	Lee Germon	Nehru Stadium, Pune	India by 5 wickets
ODI 1018	26 November	Mohammad Azharuddin	Lee Germon	Vidarbha Cricket Association Ground, Nagpur	New Zealand by 99 runs
ODI 1019	29 November	Mohammad Azharuddin	Lee Germon	Brabourne Stadium, Mumbai	India by 6 wickets

== November ==
=== Pakistan in Australia ===
Test series
No.	Date	Home captain	Away captain	Venue	Result
Test 1311	9–13 November	Mark Taylor	Wasim Akram	The Gabba, Brisbane	Australia by an innings and 126 runs
Test 1313	17–20 November	Mark Taylor	Wasim Akram	Bellerive Oval, Hobart	Australia by 155 runs
Test 1314	30 November-4 December	Mark Taylor	Wasim Akram	Sydney Cricket Ground, Sydney	Pakistan by 74 runs

=== England in South Africa ===
Test series
No.	Date	Home captain	Away captain	Venue	Result
Test 1312	16–20 November	Hansie Cronje	Mike Atherton	SuperSport Park, Centurion	Match drawn
Test 1315	30 November-4 December	Hansie Cronje	Mike Atherton	The Wanderers Stadium, Johannesburg	Match drawn
Test 1318	14–18 December	Hansie Cronje	Mike Atherton	Kingsmead Cricket Ground, Durban	Match drawn
Test 1320	26–30 December	Hansie Cronje	Mike Atherton	St George's Park, Port Elizabeth	Match drawn
Test 1321	2–4 January	Hansie Cronje	Mike Atherton	Newlands Cricket Ground, Cape Town	South Africa by 10 wickets
ODI series
No.	Date	Home captain	Away captain	Venue	Result
ODI 1033	9 January	Hansie Cronje	Mike Atherton	Newlands Cricket Ground, Cape Town	South Africa by 6 runs
ODI 1034	11 January	Hansie Cronje	Mike Atherton	Mangaung Oval, Bloemfontein	England by 5 wickets
ODI 1036	13 January	Hansie Cronje	Mike Atherton	The Wanderers Stadium, Johannesburg	South Africa by 3 wickets
ODI 1038	14 January	Hansie Cronje	Alec Stewart	SuperSport Park, Centurion	South Africa by 7 wickets
ODI 1040	17 January	Hansie Cronje	Mike Atherton	Kingsmead Cricket Ground, Durban	South Africa by 5 wickets
ODI 1042	19 January	Hansie Cronje	Mike Atherton	Buffalo Park, East London	South Africa by 14 runs
ODI 1044	21 January	Hansie Cronje	Mike Atherton	St George's Park, Port Elizabeth	South Africa by 64 runs

== December ==
=== Pakistan in New Zealand ===
Test series
No.	Date	Home captain	Away captain	Venue	Result
Test 1316	8–12 December	Lee Germon	Wasim Akram	AMI Stadium, Christchurch	Pakistan by 161 runs
ODI series
No.	Date	Home captain	Away captain	Venue	Result
ODI 1020	15 December	Lee Germon	Wasim Akram	Carisbrook, Dunedin	Pakistan by 20 runs
ODI 1022	17 December	Lee Germon	Wasim Akram	AMI Stadium, Christchurch	New Zealand by 1 wicket
ODI 1025	20 December	Lee Germon	Wasim Akram	Basin Reserve, Wellington	Pakistan by 54 runs
ODI 1027	23 December	Lee Germon	Wasim Akram	Eden Park, Auckland	New Zealand by 32 runs

=== Sri Lanka in Australia ===
Test series
No.	Date	Home captain	Away captain	Venue	Result
Test 1317	8–11 December	Mark Taylor	Arjuna Ranatunga	WACA Ground, Perth	Australia by an innings 36 runs
Test 1319	26–30 December	Mark Taylor	Arjuna Ranatunga	Melbourne Cricket Ground, Melbourne	Australia by 10 wickets
Test 1324	25–29 January	Mark Taylor	Aravinda de Silva	Adelaide Oval, Adelaide	Australia by 148 runs

=== Australian Tri-Series 1995-96 ===
Pos	Team	P	W	L	NR	T	Points	NRR
1	Australia	8	5	3	0	0	10	+0.368
2	Sri Lanka	8	3	4	1	0	7	-0.282
3	West Indies	8	3	4	1	0	7	-0.439

Group stage
No.	Date	Team 1	Captain 1	Team 2	Captain 2	Venue	Result
ODI 1021	15 December	Sri Lanka	Arjuna Ranatunga	West Indies	Richie Richardson	Adelaide Oval, Adelaide	Sri Lanka by 4 wickets
ODI 1023	17 December	Australia	Mark Taylor	West Indies	Richie Richardson	Adelaide Oval, Adelaide	Australia by 121 runs
ODI 1024	19 December	Australia	Mark Taylor	West Indies	Richie Richardson	Melbourne Cricket Ground, Melbourne	Australia by 24 runs
ODI 1026	21 December	Australia	Mark Taylor	Sri Lanka	Arjuna Ranatunga	Sydney Cricket Ground, Sydney	Australia by 5 wickets
ODI 1028	1 January	Australia	Mark Taylor	West Indies	Courtney Walsh	Sydney Cricket Ground, Sydney	Australia by 1 wicket
ODI 1029	3 January	Sri Lanka	Aravinda de Silva	West Indies	Richie Richardson	Bellerive Oval, Hobart	West Indies by 70 runs
ODI 1030	5 January	Sri Lanka	Aravinda de Silva	West Indies	Richie Richardson	The Gabba, Brisbane	West Indies by 7 wickets
ODI 1031	7 January	Australia	Mark Taylor	West Indies	Richie Richardson	The Gabba, Brisbane	West Indies by 14 runs
ODI 1032	9 January	Australia	Mark Taylor	Sri Lanka	Aravinda de Silva	Melbourne Cricket Ground, Melbourne	Sri Lanka by 3 wickets
ODI 1035	12 January	Australia	Mark Taylor	Sri Lanka	Aravinda de Silva	WACA Ground, Perth	Australia by 83 runs
ODI 1037	14 January	Sri Lanka	Aravinda de Silva	West Indies	Richie Richardson	WACA Ground, Perth	Sri Lanka by 16 runs
ODI 1039	16 January	Australia	Mark Taylor	Sri Lanka	Arjuna Ranatunga	Melbourne Cricket Ground, Melbourne	Sri Lanka by 3 wickets
Finals
No.	Date	Team 1	Captain 1	Team 2	Captain 2	Venue	Result
ODI 1041	18 January	Australia	Mark Taylor	Sri Lanka	Arjuna Ranatunga	Melbourne Cricket Ground, Melbourne	Australia by 18 runs
ODI 1043	20 January	Australia	Mark Taylor	Sri Lanka	Arjuna Ranatunga	Sydney Cricket Ground, Sydney	Australia by 9 runs

== January ==
=== Zimbabwe in New Zealand ===
Test series
No.	Date	Home captain	Away captain	Venue	Result
Test 1322	13–17 January	Lee Germon	Andy Flower	Seddon Park, Hamilton	Match drawn
Test 1323	20–24 January	Lee Germon	Andy Flower	Eden Park, Auckland	Match drawn
ODI series
No.	Date	Home captain	Away captain	Venue	Result
ODI 1045	28 January	Lee Germon	Andy Flower	Eden Park, Auckland	New Zealand by 74 runs
ODI 1046	31 January	Lee Germon	Andy Flower	Basin Reserve, Wellington	New Zealand by 6 wickets
ODI 1047	3 February	Lee Germon	Andy Flower	McLean Park, Napier	Zimbabwe by 21 runs

== February ==
=== Wills World Cup 1995-96 ===
Pos	Team	Pld	W	L	T	NR	Pts	NRR
1	Sri Lanka	5	5	0	0	0	10	1.607
2	Australia	5	3	2	0	0	6	0.903
3	India	5	3	2	0	0	6	0.452
4	West Indies	5	2	3	0	0	4	−0.134
5	Zimbabwe	5	1	4	0	0	2	−0.939
6	Kenya	5	1	4	0	0	2	−1.007

Source: ESPNcricinfo

Pos	Team	Pld	W	L	T	NR	Pts	NRR
1	South Africa	5	5	0	0	0	10	2.043
2	Pakistan	5	4	1	0	0	8	0.961
3	New Zealand	5	3	2	0	0	6	0.552
4	England	5	2	3	0	0	4	0.079
5	United Arab Emirates	5	1	4	0	0	2	−1.830
6	Netherlands	5	0	5	0	0	0	−1.923

Source: ESPNcricinfo

Group stage
No.	Date	Team 1	Captain 1	Team 2	Captain 2	Venue	Result
ODI 1048	14 February	England	Mike Atherton	New Zealand	Lee Germon	Sardar Patel Stadium, Ahmedabad	New Zealand by 11 runs
ODI 1049	16 February	South Africa	Hansie Cronje	United Arab Emirates	Sultan Zarawani	Rawalpindi Cricket Stadium, Rawalpindi	South Africa by 169 runs
ODI 1050	16 February	West Indies	Richie Richardson	Zimbabwe	Andy Flower	Lal Bahadur Shastri Stadium, Hyderabad	West Indies by 6 wickets
ODI 1051	17 February	Netherlands	Steven Lubbers	New Zealand	Lee Germon	Reliance Stadium, Vadodara	New Zealand by 119 runs
ODI 1051a	17 February	Sri Lanka	Arjuna Ranatunga	Australia	Mark Taylor	R Premadasa Stadium, Colombo	Sri Lanka by walkover
ODI 1052	18 February	India	Mohammad Azharuddin	Kenya	Maurice Odumbe	Barabati Stadium, Cuttack	India by 7 wickets
ODI 1053	18 February	England	Mike Atherton	United Arab Emirates	Sultan Zarawani	Arbab Niaz Stadium, Peshawar	England by 8 wickets
ODI 1054	20 February	New Zealand	Lee Germon	South Africa	Hansie Cronje	Iqbal Stadium, Faisalabad	South Africa by 5 wickets
ODI 1055	21 February	Sri Lanka	Arjuna Ranatunga	Zimbabwe	Andy Flower	Sinhalese Sports Club Ground, Colombo	Sri Lanka by 6 wickets
ODI 1056	21 February	India	Mohammad Azharuddin	West Indies	Richie Richardson	Captain Roop Singh Stadium, Gwalior	India by 5 wickets
ODI 1057	22 February	England	Mike Atherton	Netherlands	Steven Lubbers	Arbab Niaz Stadium, Peshawar	England by 49 runs
ODI 1058	23 February	Australia	Mark Taylor	Kenya	Maurice Odumbe	Indira Priyadarshini Stadium, Visakhapatnam	Australia by 97 runs
ODI 1059	24 February	Pakistan	Wasim Akram	United Arab Emirates	Sultan Zarawani	Jinnah Stadium, Gujranwala	Pakistan by 9 wickets
ODI 1060	25 February	England	Mike Atherton	South Africa	Hansie Cronje	Rawalpindi Cricket Stadium, Rawalpindi	South Africa by 78 runs
ODI 1060a	25 February	Sri Lanka	Arjuna Ranatunga	West Indies	Richie Richardson	R Premadasa Stadium, Colombo	Sri Lanka by walkover
ODI 1061	26 February	Kenya	Maurice Odumbe	Zimbabwe	Andy Flower	Moin-ul-Haq Stadium, Patna	No result
ODI 1062	26 February	Pakistan	Wasim Akram	Netherlands	Roland Lefebvre	Gaddafi Stadium, Lahore	Pakistan by 8 wickets
ODI 1063	27 February	Kenya	Maurice Odumbe	Zimbabwe	Andy Flower	Moin-ul-Haq Stadium, Patna	Zimbabwe by 5 wickets
ODI 1064	27 February	New Zealand	Lee Germon	United Arab Emirates	Sultan Zarawani	Iqbal Stadium, Faisalabad	New Zealand by 109 runs
ODI 1065	27 February	India	Mohammad Azharuddin	Australia	Mark Taylor	Wankhede Stadium, Mumbai	Australia by 16 runs
ODI 1066	29 February	Kenya	Maurice Odumbe	West Indies	Richie Richardson	Nehru Stadium, Pune	Kenya by 73 runs
ODI 1067	29 February	Pakistan	Wasim Akram	South Africa	Hansie Cronje	National Stadium, Karachi	South Africa by 5 wickets
ODI 1068	1 March	Australia	Mark Taylor	Zimbabwe	Andy Flower	VCA Ground, Nagpur	Australia by 16 runs
ODI 1069	1 March	Netherlands	Steven Lubbers	United Arab Emirates	Sultan Zarawani	Gaddafi Stadium, Lahore	United Arab Emirates by 7 wickets
ODI 1070	2 March	India	Mohammad Azharuddin	Sri Lanka	Arjuna Ranatunga	Feroz Shah Kotla, Delhi	Sri Lanka by 6 wickets
ODI 1071	3 March	Pakistan	Wasim Akram	England	Mike Atherton	National Stadium, Karachi	Pakistan by 7 wickets
ODI 1072	4 March	Australia	Mark Taylor	West Indies	Richie Richardson	Sawai Mansingh Stadium, Jaipur	Australia by 16 runs
ODI 1073	5 March	Netherlands	Steven Lubbers	South Africa	Hansie Cronje	Rawalpindi Cricket Stadium, Rawalpindi	South Africa by 160 runs
ODI 1074	6 March	Sri Lanka	Arjuna Ranatunga	Kenya	Maurice Odumbe	Asgiriya Stadium, Kandy	Sri Lanka by 144 runs
ODI 1075	6 March	India	Mohammad Azharuddin	Zimbabwe	Andy Flower	Green Park Stadium, Kanpur	India by 40 runs
ODI 1076	6 March	Pakistan	Wasim Akram	New Zealand	Lee Germon	Gaddafi Stadium, Lahore	Pakistan by 46 runs
Quarter finals
No.	Date	Team 1	Captain 1	Team 2	Captain 2	Venue	Result
ODI 1077	9 March	Sri Lanka	Arjuna Ranatunga	England	Mike Atherton	Iqbal Stadium, Faisalabad	Sri Lanka by 5 wickets
ODI 1078	9 March	India	Mohammad Azharuddin	Pakistan	Aamer Sohail	M. Chinnaswamy Stadium, Bangalore	India by 39 runs
ODI 1079	11 March	South Africa	Hansie Cronje	West Indies	Richie Richardson	National Stadium, Karachi	West Indies by 19 runs
ODI 1080	11 March	Australia	Mark Taylor	New Zealand	Lee Germon	MA Chidambaram Stadium, Chennai	Australia by 6 wickets
Semi finals
No.	Date	Team 1	Captain 1	Team 2	Captain 2	Venue	Result
ODI 1081	13 March	India	Mohammad Azharuddin	Sri Lanka	Arjuna Ranatunga	Eden Gardens, Kolkata	Sri Lanka by default
ODI 1082	14 March	Australia	Mark Taylor	West Indies	Richie Richardson	PCA IS Bindra Stadium, Mohali	Australia by 5 runs
Final
No.	Date	Team 1	Captain 1	Team 2	Captain 2	Venue	Result
ODI 1083	17 March	Australia	Mark Taylor	Sri Lanka	Arjuna Ranatunga	Gaddafi Stadium, Lahore	Sri Lanka by 7 wickets

== March ==
=== New Zealand in the West Indies ===
ODI series
No.	Date	Home captain	Away captain	Venue	Result
ODI 1084	26 March	Courtney Walsh	Lee Germon	Sabina Park, Kingston	West Indies by 1 wicket
ODI 1085	29 March	Courtney Walsh	Lee Germon	Queen's Park Oval, Port of Spain	New Zealand by 4 wickets
ODI 1086	30 March	Courtney Walsh	Lee Germon	Queen's Park Oval, Port of Spain	West Indies by 7 wickets
ODI 1085	3 April	Courtney Walsh	Lee Germon	Bourda, Georgetown	New Zealand by 4 runs
ODI 1092	6 April	Courtney Walsh	Lee Germon	Arnos Vale Ground, Kingstown	West Indies by 7 wickets
Test series
No.	Date	Home captain	Away captain	Venue	Result
Test 1325	19–23 April	Courtney Walsh	Lee Germon	Kensington Oval, Barbados	West Indies by 10 wickets
Test 1326	27 April-2 May	Courtney Walsh	Lee Germon	Antigua Recreation Ground, St John's	Match drawn

== April ==
=== Singer Cup 1995-96 ===
Team	P	W	L	T	NR	RR	Points
Pakistan	2	1	1	0	0	+0.56	2
Sri Lanka	2	1	1	0	0	+0.22	2
India	2	1	1	0	0	−0.46	2

Group stage
No.	Date	Team 1	Captain 1	Team 2	Captain 2	Venue	Result
ODI 1087	1 April	Pakistan	Aamer Sohail	Sri Lanka	Arjuna Ranatunga	Singapore Cricket Club, Padang	No result
ODI 1088	2 April	Pakistan	Aamer Sohail	Sri Lanka	Arjuna Ranatunga	Singapore Cricket Club, Padang	Sri Lanka by 34 runs
ODI 1089	3 April	India	Mohammad Azharuddin	Sri Lanka	Arjuna Ranatunga	Singapore Cricket Club, Padang	India by 12 runs
ODI 1091	3 April	India	Mohammad Azharuddin	Pakistan	Aamer Sohail	Singapore Cricket Club, Padang	Pakistan by 8 wickets
Final
No.	Date	Team 1	Captain 1	Team 2	Captain 2	Venue	Result
ODI 1093	1 April	Pakistan	Aamer Sohail	Sri Lanka	Arjuna Ranatunga	Singapore Cricket Club, Padang	Pakistan by 43 runs

=== Pepsi Sharjah Cup 1995-96 ===
Team	P	W	L	T	NR	RR	Points
South Africa	4	4	0	0	0	+1.67	8
India	4	1	3	0	0	−0.53	2
Pakistan	4	1	3	0	0	−1.15	2

Group stage
No.	Date	Team 1	Captain 1	Team 2	Captain 2	Venue	Result
ODI 1094	12 April	India	Mohammad Azharuddin	Pakistan	Aamer Sohail	Sharjah Cricket Stadium, Sharjah	Pakistan by 38 runs
ODI 1095	13 April	Pakistan	Aamer Sohail	South Africa	Hansie Cronje	Sharjah Cricket Stadium, Sharjah	South Africa by 143 runs
ODI 1097	14 April	India	Mohammad Azharuddin	South Africa	Hansie Cronje	Sharjah Cricket Stadium, Sharjah	South Africa by 80 runs
ODI 1098	15 April	India	Mohammad Azharuddin	Pakistan	Aamer Sohail	Sharjah Cricket Stadium, Sharjah	India by 28 runs
ODI 1099	16 April	Pakistan	Aamer Sohail	South Africa	Hansie Cronje	Sharjah Cricket Stadium, Sharjah	South Africa by 8 wickets
ODI 1100	17 April	India	Mohammad Azharuddin	South Africa	Hansie Cronje	Sharjah Cricket Stadium, Sharjah	South Africa by 5 wickets
Final
No.	Date	Team 1	Captain 1	Team 2	Captain 2	Venue	Result
ODI 1101	19 April	India	Mohammad Azharuddin	South Africa	Hansie Cronje	Sharjah Cricket Stadium, Sharjah	South Africa by 38 runs

=== Sri Lanka in the West Indies ===
One-off ODI
No.	Date	Home captain	Away captain	Venue	Result
ODI 1096	13 April	Courtney Walsh	Arjuna Ranatunga	Queen's Park Oval, Port of Spain	Sri Lanka by 35 runs
