= List of India ODI cricketers =

A One Day International (ODI) is an international cricket match between two representative teams, each having ODI status, as determined by the International Cricket Council (ICC). An ODI differs from Test matches in that the number of overs per team is limited, and that each team has only one innings.

India played their first ODI in 1974 and a total of 260 players have represented the team. Since 1974 India has played 1,058 ODIs, resulting in 559 victories, 445 defeats, 10 ties and 44 no results. India's first series victory came against England in 1981, winning 2–1. India won the Cricket World Cup twice in 1983 and 2011 and was runner-up in 2003 and 2023. India won the ICC Champions Trophy in the year 2013 and had earlier shared once with Sri Lanka in 2002 because rain washed out the attempt to complete the final twice. India was also runner-up in 2000. India have won the Asia Cup (in ODI format) a total of seven times in 1984, 1988, 1990, 1995, 2010, 2018 and 2023.

Sachin Tendulkar is the youngest debutant at the age of 16 years and 238 days and Farokh Engineer is the oldest debutant at the age of 36 years and 138 days. Anil Kumble is the leading wicket taker with 337 wickets to his name, and Sachin Tendulkar is the leading run scorer with 18,426 runs to his name from 452 innings at an average of 44.83. Tendulkar holds the record for playing the most ODI matches played (463). He also holds the world record number of Man of the Match awards. Rohit Sharma's score of 264 against Sri Lanka in November 2014 is the highest number of runs scored by any player in an ODI. Sourav Ganguly's 183 against Sri Lanka is the highest number of runs scored by an Indian Cricketer in a Cricket World Cup match.

== Key ==
General

- ‡ – Captain
- † – Wicket-keeper
- *: an innings that ended not out
- Mat: number of matches played

Batting

- Inn: number of innings
- NO: number of times an innings ends not out
- Runs: number of runs scored by batsman/off bowler's bowling
- HS: highest score
- Avg: batting average

Bowling

- Balls: number of deliveries bowled
- Mdn: number of maiden overs (overs off which no runs were scored)
- Wkt: number of wickets taken
- BBM: best bowling figures for the match
- Avg: bowling average

Fielding

- Ca: number of catches taken
- St: number of stumpings made

== Players ==
The list is arranged in the order in which each player won his first ODI cap. Where more than one player won his first ODI cap in the same match, those players are listed alphabetically by last name at the time of debut. The statistics in this table only include ODI matches played for India (some players have also played for the Asia XI or World XI).

Statistics are correct as of 18 January 2026.

General					Batting					Bowling						Fielding	
Cap No	Name	First	Last	Mat	Inn	NO	Runs	HS	Avg	Balls	Mdn	Runs	Wkt	BBM	Avg	Ca	St
1	Syed Abid Ali	1974	1975	5	3	0	93	70	31.00	336	10	187	7	2/22	26.71	0	0
2	Bishan Singh Bedi‡	1974	1979	10	7	2	31	13	6.20	590	17	340	7	2/44	48.57	4	0
3	Farokh Engineer†	1974	1975	5	4	1	114	54*	38.00	—	—	—	—	—	—	3	1
4	Sunil Gavaskar‡	1974	1987	108	102	14	3092	103*	35.13	20	0	25	1	1/10	25.00	22	0
5	Madan Lal	1974	1987	67	35	14	401	53*	19.09	3164	44	2137	73	4/20	29.27	18	0
6	Sudhir Naik	1974	1974	2	2	0	38	20	19.00	—	—	—	—	—	—	0	0
7	Brijesh Patel	1974	1979	10	9	1	243	82	30.37	—	—	—	—	—	—	1	0
8	Eknath Solkar	1974	1976	7	6	0	27	13	4.50	252	4	169	4	2/31	42.25	2	0
9	Srinivasaraghavan Venkataraghavan‡	1974	1983	15	9	4	54	26*	10.80	868	7	542	5	2/34	108.40	4	0
10	Gundappa Viswanath‡	1974	1982	25	23	1	439	75	19.95	—	—	—	—	—	—	3	0
11	Ajit Wadekar‡	1974	1974	2	2	0	73	67	36.50	—	—	—	—	—	—	1	0
12	Gopal Bose	1974	1974	1	1	0	13	13	13.00	66	2	39	1	1/39	39.00	0	0
13	Ashok Mankad	1974	1974	1	1	0	44	44	44.00	35	0	47	1	1/47	47.00	0	0
14	Mohinder Amarnath‡	1975	1989	85	75	12	1924	102*	30.53	2730	17	1971	46	3/12	42.84	23	0
15	Anshuman Gaekwad	1975	1987	15	14	1	269	78*	20.69	48	0	39	1	1/39	39.00	6	0
16	Karsan Ghavri	1975	1981	19	16	6	114	20	11.40	1033	12	708	15	3/40	47.20	2	0
17	Syed Kirmani‡†	1976	1986	49	31	13	373	48*	20.72	—	—	—	—	—	—	27	9
18	Parthasarathy Sharma	1976	1976	2	2	0	20	14	10.00	—	—	—	—	—	—	0	0
19	Dilip Vengsarkar‡	1976	1991	129	120	19	3508	105	34.73	6	0	4	0	—	—	37	0
20	B. S. Chandrasekhar	1976	1976	1	1	1	11	11*	—	56	0	36	3	3/36	12.00	0	0
21	Pochiah Krishnamurthy†	1976	1976	1	1	0	6	6	6.00	—	—	—	—	—	—	1	1
22	Sudhakar Rao	1976	1976	1	1	0	4	4	4.00	—	—	—	—	—	—	1	0
23	Surinder Amarnath	1978	1978	3	3	0	100	62	33.33	—	—	—	—	—	—	1	0
24	Chetan Chauhan	1978	1981	7	7	0	153	46	21.85	—	—	—	—	—	—	3	0
25	Kapil Dev‡	1978	1994	225	198	39	3783	175*	23.79	11202	235	6945	253	5/43	27.45	71	0
26	Yashpal Sharma	1978	1985	42	40	9	883	89	28.48	201	0	199	1	1/27	199.00	10	0
27	Bharath Reddy	1978	1981	3	2	2	11	8*	—	—	—	—	—	—	—	2	0
28	Surinder Khanna†	1979	1984	10	10	2	176	56	22.00	—	—	—	—	—	—	4	4
29	Kirti Azad	1980	1986	25	21	2	269	39*	14.15	390	4	273	7	2/48	39.00	7	0
30	Roger Binny	1980	1987	72	49	10	629	57	16.12	2957	37	2260	77	4/29	29.35	12	0
31	Dilip Doshi	1980	1982	15	5	2	9	5*	3.00	792	8	524	22	4/30	23.81	3	0
32	Sandeep Patil	1980	1986	45	42	1	1005	84	24.51	864	9	589	15	2/28	39.26	11	0
33	T. E. Srinivasan	1980	1981	2	2	0	10	6	5.00	—	—	—	—	—	—	0	0
34	Yograj Singh	1980	1981	6	4	2	1	1	0.50	244	4	186	4	2/44	46.50	2	0
35	Randhir Singh	1981	1983	2	—	—	—	—	—	72	0	48	1	1/30	48.00	0	0
36	Ravi Shastri‡	1981	1992	150	128	21	3108	109	29.04	6613	56	4650	129	5/15	36.04	40	0
37	Krishnamachari Srikkanth‡	1981	1992	146	145	4	4091	123	29.01	712	3	641	25	5/27	25.64	42	0
38	Suru Nayak	1981	1982	4	1	0	3	3	3.00	222	4	161	1	1/51	161.00	1	0
39	Arun Lal	1982	1989	13	13	0	122	51	9.38	—	—	—	—	—	—	4	0
40	Ashok Malhotra	1982	1986	20	19	4	457	65	30.46	6	1	0	0	—	—	4	0
41	Ghulam Parkar	1982	1984	10	10	1	165	42	18.33	—	—	—	—	—	—	4	0
42	Balwinder Sandhu	1982	1984	22	7	3	51	16*	12.75	1110	15	763	16	3/27	47.68	5	0
43	Maninder Singh	1983	1993	59	18	14	49	8*	12.25	3133	33	2066	66	4/22	31.30	18	0
44	T. A. Sekhar	1983	1985	4	—	—	—	—	—	156	0	128	5	3/23	25.60	0	0
45	Chetan Sharma	1983	1994	65	35	16	456	101*	24.00	2835	19	2336	67	3/78	34.86	7	0
46	Raju Kulkarni	1983	1987	10	5	3	33	15	16.50	444	4	345	10	3/42	34.50	2	0
47	Manoj Prabhakar	1984	1996	130	98	21	1858	106	24.12	6360	76	4534	157	5/33	28.87	27	0
48	Ashok Patel	1984	1985	8	2	0	6	6	3.00	360	4	263	7	3/43	37.57	1	0
49	Rajinder Ghai	1984	1986	6	1	0	1	1	1.00	275	1	260	3	1/38	86.66	0	0
50	Kiran More†	1984	1993	94	65	22	563	42*	13.09	—	—	—	—	—	—	63	27
51	Mohammad Azharuddin‡	1985	2000	334	308	54	9378	153*	36.92	552	1	479	12	3/19	39.91	156	0
52	Sadanand Viswanath†	1985	1988	22	12	4	72	23*	9.00	—	—	—	—	—	—	17	7
53	Lalchand Rajput	1985	1987	4	4	1	9	8	3.00	42	0	42	0	—	—	2	0
54	Laxman Sivaramakrishnan	1985	1987	16	4	2	5	2*	2.50	756	5	538	15	3/35	35.86	7	0
55	Gopal Sharma	1985	1987	11	2	0	11	7	5.50	486	1	361	10	3/29	36.10	2	0
56	Shivlal Yadav	1986	1987	7	2	2	1	1*	—	330	3	228	8	2/18	28.50	1	0
57	Chandrakant Pandit†	1986	1992	36	23	9	290	33*	20.71	—	—	—	—	—	—	15	15
58	Raman Lamba	1986	1989	32	31	2	783	102	27.00	19	0	20	1	1/9	20.00	10	0
59	R. P. Singh	1986	1986	2	—	—	—	—	—	82	1	77	1	1/58	77.00	0	0
60	Bharat Arun	1986	1987	4	3	1	21	8	10.50	102	0	103	1	1/43	103.00	0	0
61	Navjot Singh Sidhu	1987	1998	136	127	8	4413	134*	37.08	4	0	3	0	—	—	20	0
62	Arshad Ayub	1987	1990	32	17	7	116	31*	11.60	1769	19	1216	31	5/21	39.22	5	0
63	Woorkeri Raman	1988	1996	27	27	1	617	114	23.73	162	2	170	2	1/23	85.00	2	0
64	Ajay Sharma	1988	1993	31	27	6	424	59*	20.19	1140	5	875	15	3/41	58.33	6	0
65	Sanjeev Sharma	1988	1990	23	12	4	80	28	10.00	979	6	813	22	5/26	36.95	7	0
66	Sanjay Manjrekar	1988	1996	74	70	10	1994	105	33.23	8	0	10	1	1/2	10.00	23	0
67	Narendra Hirwani	1988	1992	18	7	3	8	4	2.00	960	6	719	23	4/43	31.26	2	0
68	V. B. Chandrasekhar	1988	1990	7	7	0	88	53	12.57	—	—	—	—	—	—	0	0
69	Rashid Patel	1988	1988	1	—	—	—	—	—	60	1	58	0	—	—	0	0
70	M. Venkataramana	1988	1988	1	1	1	0	0*	—	60	0	36	2	2/36	18.00	0	0
71	Robin Singh	1989	2001	136	113	23	2336	100	25.95	3734	28	2985	69	5/22	43.26	33	0
72	Salil Ankola	1989	1997	20	13	4	34	9	3.77	807	4	615	13	3/33	47.30	2	0
73	Vivek Razdan	1989	1990	3	3	1	23	18	11.50	84	0	77	1	1/37	77.00	4	0
74	Sachin Tendulkar‡	1989	2012	463	452	41	18426	200*	44.83	8054	24	6850	154	5/32	44.48	140	0
75	Venkatapathy Raju	1990	1996	53	16	8	32	8	4.00	2770	16	2014	63	4/46	31.96	8	0
76	Atul Wassan	1990	1991	9	6	2	33	16	8.25	426	0	283	11	3/28	25.72	2	0
77	Gursharan Singh	1990	1990	1	1	0	4	4	4.00	—	—	—	—	—	—	1	0
78	Anil Kumble^{1}‡	1990	2007	269	134	47	903	26	10.37	14376	109	10300	337	6/12	30.56	85	0
79	Saradindu Mukherjee	1990	1991	3	1	1	2	2*	—	174	2	98	2	1/30	49.00	1	0
80	Vinod Kambli	1991	2000	104	97	21	2477	106	32.59	4	0	7	1	1/7	7.00	15	0
81	Javagal Srinath	1991	2003	229	121	38	883	53	10.63	11935	137	8847	315	5/23	28.08	32	0
82	Pravin Amre	1991	1994	37	30	5	513	84*	20.52	2	0	4	0	—	—	12	0
83	Subroto Banerjee	1991	1992	6	5	3	49	25*	24.50	240	4	202	5	3/30	40.40	3	0
84	Sourav Ganguly^{1}‡	1992	2007	308	297	23	11221	183	40.95	4543	30	3835	100	5/16	38.35	99	0
85	Ajay Jadeja‡	1992	2000	196	179	36	5359	119	37.47	1248	2	1094	20	3/3	54.70	59	0
86	Vijay Yadav†	1992	1994	19	12	2	118	34*	11.80	—	—	—	—	—	—	12	7
87	Rajesh Chauhan	1993	1997	35	18	5	132	32	10.15	1634	12	1216	29	3/29	41.93	10	0
88	Nayan Mongia†	1994	2000	140	96	33	1272	69	20.19	—	—	—	—	—	—	110	44
89	Venkatesh Prasad	1994	2001	161	63	31	221	19	6.90	8129	79	6332	196	5/27	32.30	37	0
90	Atul Bedade	1994	1994	13	10	3	158	51	22.57	—	—	—	—	—	—	4	0
91	Bhupinder Singh, Sr.	1994	1994	2	1	0	6	6	6.00	102	1	78	3	3/34	26.00	0	0
92	Aashish Kapoor	1995	2000	17	6	0	43	19	7.16	900	5	612	8	2/33	76.50	1	0
93	Prashant Vaidya	1995	1996	4	2	0	15	12	7.50	184	1	174	4	2/41	43.50	2	0
94	Utpal Chatterjee	1995	1995	3	2	1	6	3*	6.00	161	0	117	3	2/35	39.00	1	0
95	Rahul Dravid^{2}‡†	1996	2011	340	314	39	10768	153	39.15	186	1	170	4	2/43	42.50	196	14
96	Vikram Rathour	1996	1997	7	7	0	193	54	27.57	—	—	—	—	—	—	4	0
97	Paras Mhambrey	1996	1998	3	1	1	7	7*	—	126	1	120	3	2/69	40.00	0	0
98	Sunil Joshi	1996	2001	69	45	11	584	61*	17.17	3386	33	2509	69	5/6	36.36	19	0
99	Sujith Somasunder	1996	1996	2	2	0	16	9	8.00	—	—	—	—	—	—	0	0
100	Pankaj Dharmani	1996	1996	1	1	0	8	8	8.00	—	—	—	—	—	—	0	0
101	Saba Karim†	1997	2000	34	27	4	362	55	15.73	—	—	—	—	—	—	27	3
102	Dodda Ganesh	1997	1997	1	1	0	4	4	4.00	30	0	20	1	1/20	20.00	0	0
103	Abey Kuruvilla	1997	1997	25	11	4	26	7	3.71	1131	18	890	25	4/43	35.60	4	0
104	Noel David	1997	1997	4	2	2	9	8*	—	192	1	133	4	3/21	33.25	0	0
105	Nilesh Kulkarni	1997	1998	10	5	3	11	5*	5.50	402	3	357	11	3/27	32.45	2	0
106	Harvinder Singh	1997	2001	16	5	1	6	3*	1.50	686	6	609	24	3/44	25.37	6	0
107	Debashish Mohanty	1997	2001	45	11	6	28	18*	5.60	1996	21	1662	57	4/56	29.15	10	0
108	Sairaj Bahutule	1997	2003	8	4	1	23	11	7.66	294	0	283	2	1/31	141.50	3	0
109	Hrishikesh Kanitkar	1997	2000	34	27	8	339	57	17.84	1006	4	803	17	2/22	47.23	14	0
110	Rahul Sanghvi	1998	1998	10	2	0	8	8	4.00	498	1	399	10	3/29	39.90	4	0
111	Ajit Agarkar	1998	2007	191	113	26	1269	95	14.58	9484	100	8021	288	6/42	27.85	52	0
112	V. V. S. Laxman	1998	2006	86	83	7	2338	131	30.76	42	0	40	0	—	—	39	0
113	Harbhajan Singh^{1}	1998	2015	234	126	35	1213	49	13.32	12359	83	8872	265	5/31	33.47	71	0
114	Gagan Khoda	1998	1998	2	2	0	115	89	57.50	—	—	—	—	—	—	0	0
115	M. S. K. Prasad†	1998	1999	17	11	2	131	63	14.55	—	—	—	—	—	—	14	7
116	Nikhil Chopra	1998	2000	39	26	6	310	61	15.50	1835	21	1286	46	5/21	27.95	16	0
117	Jatin Paranjpe	1998	1998	4	4	1	54	27	18.00	—	—	—	—	—	—	2	0
118	Sanjay Raul	1998	1998	2	2	0	8	8	4.00	36	1	27	1	1/13	27.00	0	0
119	Laxmi Ratan Shukla	1999	1999	3	2	0	18	13	9.00	114	0	94	1	1/25	94.00	1	0
120	Gyanendra Pandey	1999	1999	2	2	1	4	4*	4.00	78	1	60	0	—	—	0	0
121	Amay Khurasiya	1999	2001	12	11	0	149	57	13.54	—	—	—	—	—	—	3	0
122	Sadagoppan Ramesh	1999	1999	24	24	1	646	82	28.08	36	0	38	1	1/23	38.00	3	0
123	Virender Sehwag^{2}‡	1999	2013	241	235	9	7995	219	35.37	4290	13	3737	94	4/6	39.75	90	0
124	Jacob Martin	1999	2001	10	8	1	158	39	22.57	—	—	—	—	—	—	6	0
125	Vijay Bharadwaj	1999	2002	10	9	4	136	41*	27.20	372	3	307	16	3/34	19.18	4	0
126	Thirunavukkarasu Kumaran	1999	2000	8	3	0	19	8	6.33	378	4	348	9	3/24	38.66	3	0
127	Devang Gandhi	1999	2000	3	3	0	49	30	16.33	—	—	—	—	—	—	0	0
128	Sameer Dighe†	2000	2001	23	17	6	256	94*	23.27	—	—	—	—	—	—	19	5
129	Sridharan Sriram	2000	2004	8	7	1	81	57	13.50	324	1	274	9	3/43	30.44	1	0
130	Hemang Badani	2000	2004	40	36	10	867	100	33.34	183	0	149	3	1/7	49.66	13	0
131	Amit Bhandari	2000	2004	2	1	1	—	0*	—	106	0	106	5	3/31	21.20	0	0
132	Vijay Dahiya†	2000	2001	19	15	2	216	51	16.61	—	—	—	—	—	—	19	5
133	Zaheer Khan^{1}	2000	2012	194	96	31	753	34*	11.58	9815	112	8102	269	5/42	30.11	43	0
134	Yuvraj Singh^{1}	2000	2017	301	275	39	8609	150	36.47	4988	18	4227	110	5/31	38.42	93	0
135	Reetinder Singh Sodhi	2000	2002	18	14	3	280	67	25.45	462	3	365	5	2/31	73.00	9	0
136	Dinesh Mongia	2001	2007	57	51	7	1230	159*	27.95	640	1	571	14	3/31	40.78	21	0
137	Ashish Nehra^{1}	2001	2011	117	45	21	140	24	5.83	5637	53	4899	155	6/23	31.60	17	0
138	Shiv Sunder Das	2001	2002	4	4	1	39	30	13.00	—	—	—	—	—	—	0	0
139	Deep Dasgupta†	2001	2001	5	4	1	51	24*	17.00	—	—	—	—	—	—	2	1
140	Ajay Ratra†	2002	2002	12	8	1	90	30	12.85	—	—	—	—	—	—	11	5
141	Sanjay Bangar	2002	2004	15	15	2	180	57*	13.84	442	2	384	7	2/39	54.85	4	0
142	Mohammad Kaif	2002	2006	125	110	24	2753	111*	32.01	—	—	—	—	—	—	55	0
143	Sarandeep Singh	2002	2003	5	4	1	47	19	15.66	258	1	180	3	2/34	60.00	2	0
144	Murali Kartik	2002	2007	37	14	5	126	32*	14.00	1907	19	1612	37	6/27	43.56	10	0
145	Tinu Yohannan	2002	2002	3	2	2	7	5*	—	120	1	122	5	3/33	24.40	0	0
146	Jai Yadav	2002	2005	12	7	3	81	69	20.25	396	4	326	6	2/32	54.33	3	0
147	Lakshmipathy Balaji	2002	2009	30	16	6	120	21*	12.00	1447	12	1344	34	4/48	39.52	11	0
148	Parthiv Patel†	2003	2012	38	34	3	736	95	23.74	—	—	—	—	—	—	30	9
149	Gautam Gambhir‡	2003	2013	147	143	11	5238	150*	39.68	6	0	13	0	—	—	36	0
150	Aavishkar Salvi	2003	2003	4	3	1	4	4*	2.00	172	3	120	4	2/15	30.00	2	0
151	Amit Mishra	2003	2016	36	11	3	43	14	5.37	1917	19	1511	64	6/48	23.60	5	0
152	Abhijit Kale	2003	2003	1	1	0	10	10	10.00	—	—	—	—	—	—	0	0
153	Irfan Pathan	2004	2012	120	87	21	1544	83	23.39	5855	48	5143	173	5/27	29.72	21	0
154	Rohan Gavaskar	2004	2004	11	10	2	151	54	18.87	72	0	74	1	1/56	74.00	5	0
155	Ramesh Powar	2004	2007	31	19	5	163	54	11.64	1536	6	1191	34	3/24	35.02	3	0
156	Dinesh Karthik†	2004	2019	94	79	21	1752	79	30.20	—	—	—	—	—	—	64	7
157	M.S. Dhoni^{1}‡†	2004	2019	350	294	84	10773	183*	50.57	36	0	31	1	1/14	31.00	318	120
158	Joginder Sharma	2004	2007	4	3	2	35	29*	35.00	150	3	115	1	1/28	115.00	3	0
159	Suresh Raina‡	2005	2018	226	194	35	5615	116*	35.31	2126	5	1811	36	3/34	50.30	102	0
160	Yalaka Venugopal Rao	2005	2006	16	11	2	218	61*	24.22	—	—	—	—	—	—	6	0
161	R. P. Singh	2005	2011	58	20	10	104	23	10.40	2565	31	2343	69	4/35	33.95	13	0
162	S. Sreesanth	2005	2011	53	21	10	44	10*	4.00	2476	16	2508	75	6/55	33.44	7	0
163	Munaf Patel	2006	2011	70	27	16	74	15	6.72	3154	38	2603	86	4/29	30.26	6	0
164	V. R. V. Singh	2006	2006	2	1	0	8	8	8.00	72	0	105	0	—	—	3	0
165	Robin Uthappa†	2006	2015	46	42	6	934	86	25.94	—	—	—	—	—	—	19	2
166	Wasim Jaffer	2006	2006	2	2	0	10	10	5.00	—	—	—	—	—	—	0	0
167	Piyush Chawla	2007	2011	25	12	5	38	13*	5.42	1312	6	1117	32	4/23	34.90	9	0
168	Rohit Sharma‡	2007	2026	282	274	37	11577	264	48.84	610	2	533	9	2/27	59.22	103	0
169	Ishant Sharma	2007	2016	80	28	13	72	13	4.80	3733	29	3563	115	4/34	30.98	19	0
170	Praveen Kumar	2007	2012	68	33	12	292	54	13.90	3242	44	2774	77	4/31	36.02	11	0
171	Manoj Tiwary	2008	2015	12	12	1	287	104*	26.09	132	0	150	5	4/61	30.00	4	0
172	Yusuf Pathan	2008	2012	57	41	11	810	123*	27.00	1490	3	1365	33	3/49	41.36	17	0
173	Manpreet Gony	2008	2008	2	—	—	—	—	—	78	1	76	2	2/65	38.00	0	0
174	Pragyan Ojha	2008	2012	18	10	8	46	16*	23.00	876	5	652	21	4/38	31.04	7	0
175	Virat Kohli‡	2008	2026	311	299	47	14797	183	58.71	662	1	680	5	1/13	136.00	167	0
176	Subramaniam Badrinath	2008	2011	7	6	1	79	27*	15.80	—	—	—	—	—	—	2	0
177	Ravindra Jadeja	2009	2026	210	142	52	2905	87	32.27	10404	59	8478	232	5/36	36.54	79	0
178	Abhishek Nayar	2009	2009	3	1	1	0	0*	—	18	0	17	0	—	—	0	0
179	Sudeep Tyagi	2009	2010	4	1	1	1	1*	—	165	4	144	3	1/15	48.00	1	0
180	Abhimanyu Mithun	2010	2011	5	3	0	51	24	17.00	180	1	203	3	2/32	92.72	1	0
181	Murali Vijay	2010	2015	17	16	0	339	72	21.18	36	0	37	1	1/19	37.00	9	0
182	Ashok Dinda	2010	2013	13	5	0	21	16	4.20	594	1	612	12	2/44	51.00	1	0
183	Vinay Kumar	2010	2013	31	13	4	86	27*	9.55	1436	19	1423	38	4/30	37.44	6	0
184	Umesh Yadav	2010	2018	75	24	14	79	18*	7.90	3558	23	3565	106	4/31	33.63	22	0
185	Ravichandran Ashwin	2010	2023	116	63	20	707	65	16.44	6303	37	5180	156	4/25	33.20	31	0
186	Naman Ojha†	2010	2010	1	1	0	1	1	1.00	—	—	—	—	—	—	0	1
187	Pankaj Singh	2010	2010	1	1	1	3	3*	—	42	0	45	0	—	—	1	0
188	Shikhar Dhawan‡	2010	2022	167	164	10	6793	143	44.11	—	—	—	—	—	—	83	0
189	Saurabh Tiwary	2010	2010	3	2	2	49	37*	—	—	—	—	—	—	—	2	0
190	Wriddhiman Saha	2010	2014	9	5	2	41	16	13.66	—	—	—	—	—	—	17	1
191	Ajinkya Rahane‡	2011	2018	90	87	3	2962	111	35.26	—	—	—	—	—	—	48	0
192	Varun Aaron	2011	2014	9	3	2	8	6*	8.00	380	1	419	11	3/24	38.09	1	0
193	Rahul Sharma	2011	2012	4	1	0	1	1	1.00	206	0	177	6	3/43	29.50	1	0
194	Bhuvneshwar Kumar	2012	2022	121	55	16	552	53*	14.15	5847	68	4951	141	5/42	35.11	29	0
195	Mohammed Shami	2013	2025	108	49	20	225	25	7.75	5326	52	4955	206	7/57	24.05	32	0
196	Ambati Rayudu	2013	2019	55	50	14	1694	124*	47.05	121	1	124	3	1/5	41.33	17	0
197	Jaydev Unadkat	2013	2023	8	—	—	—	—	—	342	5	225	9	4/41	25.00	1	0
198	Cheteshwar Pujara	2013	2014	5	5	0	51	27	10.20	—	—	—	—	—	—	0	0
199	Mohit Sharma	2013	2015	26	9	5	31	11	7.75	1121	12	1020	31	4/22	32.90	6	0
200	Stuart Binny	2014	2015	14	11	3	230	77	28.75	490	4	439	20	6/4	21.95	3	0
201	Parvez Rasool	2014	2014	1	—	—	—	—	—	60	0	60	2	2/60	30.00	0	0
202	Axar Patel	2014	2025	71	49	12	858	64*	23.18	3287	23	2461	75	3/24	32.81	29	0
203	Dhawal Kulkarni	2014	2016	12	2	2	27	25*	—	598	5	508	19	4/34	26.73	2	0
204	Karn Sharma	2014	2014	2	—	—	—	—	—	114	1	125	0	—	—	3	0
205	Kedar Jadhav	2014	2020	73	52	19	1389	120	42.09	1187	1	1020	27	3/23	37.77	33	0
206	Manish Pandey	2015	2021	29	24	7	566	104*	33.29	—	—	—	—	—	—	10	0
207	Barinder Sran	2016	2016	6	—	—	—	—	—	302	2	269	7	3/56	38.42	1	0
208	Rishi Dhawan	2016	2016	3	2	1	12	9	12.00	150	0	160	1	1/74	160.00	0	0
209	Gurkeerat Singh	2016	2016	3	3	1	13	8	6.50	60	0	68	0	—	—	1	0
210	Jasprit Bumrah	2016	2026	89	26	14	91	16	7.58	4580	57	3509	149	6/19	23.55	18	0
211	Yuzvendra Chahal	2016	2023	72	14	5	77	18*	8.55	3739	14	3283	121	6/42	27.13	16	0
212	Karun Nair	2016	2016	2	2	0	46	39	23.00	—	—	—	—	—	—	0	0
213	KL Rahul ‡†	2016	2026	94	86	20	3360	112*	50.90	—	—	—	—	—	—	80	8
214	Faiz Fazal	2016	2016	1	1	1	55	55*	—	—	—	—	—	—	—	0	0
215	Hardik Pandya‡	2016	2025	94	68	10	1904	92*	32.82	3460	16	3231	91	4/24	35.50	35	0
216	Jayant Yadav	2016	2022	2	2	1	3	2	3.00	84	0	61	1	1/8	61.00	1	0
217	Kuldeep Yadav	2017	2026	120	44	22	212	19	9.63	6144	31	5205	194	6/25	26.82	20	0
218	Shardul Thakur	2017	2023	47	25	6	329	50*	17.31	1940	10	2014	65	4/37	30.98	9	0
219	Shreyas Iyer	2017	2026	76	70	6	2977	128*	46.51	37	0	39	0	—	—	29	0
220	Washington Sundar	2017	2026	29	20	2	372	51	20.66	1014	5	837	29	3/30	28.86	7	0
221	Siddarth Kaul	2018	2018	3	2	0	1	1	0.50	162	0	179	0	—	—	1	0
222	Khaleel Ahmed	2018	2019	11	3	1	9	5	4.50	480	2	465	15	3/13	31.00	1	0
223	Deepak Chahar	2018	2022	13	9	3	203	69*	33.83	510	5	489	16	3/27	30.56	1	0
224	Rishabh Pant †	2018	2024	31	27	1	871	125*	33.50	—	—	—	—	—	—	27	1
225	Mohammed Siraj	2019	2026	50	21	13	57	9*	7.12	2251	34	1925	76	6/21	25.32	7	0
226	Vijay Shankar	2019	2019	12	8	1	223	46	31.85	233	0	210	4	2/15	52.50	7	0
227	Shubman Gill	2019	2026	61	61	87	2953	208	55.71	18	0	25	0	—	—	38	0
228	Shivam Dube	2019	2024	4	4	0	43	25	10.75	107	1	106	1	1/19	52.50	1	0
229	Navdeep Saini	2019	2021	8	5	3	107	45	53.50	420	0	481	6	2/58	80.16	3	0
230	Mayank Agarwal	2020	2020	5	5	0	86	32	17.20	—	—	—	—	—	—	2	0
231	Prithvi Shaw	2020	2021	6	6	0	189	49	31.50	—	—	—	—	—	—	2	0
232	T. Natarajan	2020	2021	2	1	0	0	0*	—	120	1	143	3	2/70	47.66	0	0
233	Krunal Pandya	2021	2021	5	4	2	130	58*	65.00	228	1	223	2	1/26	111.50	1	0
234	Prasidh Krishna	2021	2026	23	7	5	2	2*	1.00	1097	8	1102	40	4/12	27.55	4	0
235	Ishan Kishan†	2021	2026	27	24	2	933	210	42.40	—	—	—	—	—	—	13	2
236	Suryakumar Yadav	2021	2023	37	35	5	773	72*	25.76	12	0	17	0	—	—	17	0
237	Rahul Chahar	2021	2021	1	1	0	13	13	13.00	60	0	54	3	3/54	18.00	0	0
238	Krishnappa Gowtham	2021	2021	1	1	0	2	2	2.00	48	0	49	1	1/49	49.00	1	0
239	Nitish Rana	2021	2021	1	1	0	7	7	7.00	18	0	10	0	—	—	0	0
240	Chetan Sakariya	2021	2021	1	1	0	0	0*	—	48	0	34	2	2/34	17.00	2	0
241	Sanju Samson†	2021	2023	16	14	5	510	108	56.66	—	—	—	—	—	—	9	2
242	Venkatesh Iyer	2022	2022	2	2	0	24	22	12.00	30	0	28	0	—	—	0	0
243	Deepak Hooda	2022	2022	10	7	1	153	33	25.50	150	1	119	3	1/6	39.66	3	0
244	Avesh Khan	2022	2023	8	4	1	23	10	7.66	356	5	329	9	4/27	36.55	3	0
245	Ruturaj Gaikwad	2022	2026	9	8	0	228	105	28.50	—	—	—	—	—	—	4	0
246	Ravi Bishnoi	2022	2022	1	1	1	4	4*		48	0	69	1	1/69	69.00	0	0
247	Shahbaz Ahmed	2022	2022	3	0	0	0	0	0.00	156	0	125	3	2/32	41.66	1	0
248	Arshdeep Singh	2022	2026	15	10	2	56	18	7.00	681	5	611	25	5/37	24.44	1	3
249	Umran Malik	2022	2023	10	4	3	2	2*	2.00	366	2	399	13	3/57	30.69	2	0
250	Kuldeep Sen	2022	2022	1	1	1	2	2*	—	30	0	37	2	2/37	18.50	0	0
251	Mukesh Kumar	2023	2023	6	12	1	10	6	10.00	234	4	217	5	3/30	43.40	1	0
252	Tilak Varma	2023	2026	5	4	1	68	52	22.66	60	0	68	0	—	—	1	0
253	Sai Sudharshan	2023	2023	3	3	1	127	62	63.50	3	0	8	0	—	—	1	0
254	Rinku Singh	2023	2023	2	2	0	55	38	27.50	6	0	2	1	1/2	2.00	1	0
255	Rajat Patidar	2023	2023	1	1	0	22	22	22.00	—	—	—	—	—	—	0	0
256	Riyan Parag	2024	2024	1	1	0	15	15	15.00	54	0	54	3	3/54	18.00	0	0
257	Yashasvi Jaiswal	2025	2025	4	4	1	171	116*	57.00	—	—	—	—	—	—	2	0
258	Harshit Rana	2025	2026	14	7	2	124	52	24.80	687	5	712	26	4/39	27.38	2	0
259	Varun Chakravarthy	2025	2025	4	-	-	-	-	-	240	0	190	10	5/42	19.00	0	0
260	Nitish Kumar Reddy	2025	2026	4	4	1	100	53	33.33	91	0	106	0	—	—	1	0
261	Harsh Dubey	2026	2026							30	0	47	3	3/47	15.67	0	0
262	Gurnoor Brar	2026	2026							29	0	27	3	3/27	9.00	0	0
263	Prince Yadav	2026	2026	1	0	5	5	5	5.00	44	0	56	2	2/56	7.46	1	0

Notes:

- ^{1} Anil Kumble, Sourav Ganguly, Harbhajan Singh, Zaheer Khan, Yuvraj Singh, Ashish Nehra and Mahendra Singh Dhoni also played ODI cricket for ACC Asian XI. Only their records for India are given above.
- ^{2} Rahul Dravid and Virender Sehwag have played ODI cricket for both the ICC World XI and the ACC Asian XI. Only their records for India are given above.

== Captains ==
A total of 27 players have captained the Indian ODI team.

Number	Name	Year	Played	Won	Lost	Tied	No result	Win % (Note: Percentage is worked out by counting tied games as half a win and excluding no results from the equation.)
1	Ajit Wadekar	1974	2	0	2	0	0	0
2	S. Venkataraghavan	1975–1979	7	1	6	0	0	14
3	Bishan Singh Bedi	1975–1978	4	1	3	0	0	25
4	Sunil Gavaskar	1980–1986	37	14	21	0	2	40
5	Gundappa Viswanath	1980	1	0	1	0	0	0
6	Kapil Dev	1982–1992	74	40	32	0	2	56
7	Syed Kirmani	1983	1	0	1	0	0	0
8	Mohinder Amarnath	1984	1	0	0	0	1	—
9	Ravi Shastri	1986–1991	11	4	7	0	0	36
10	Dilip Vengsarkar	1987–1988	18	8	10	0	0	44
11	Krishnamachari Srikkanth	1989–1990	13	4	8	0	1	33
12	Mohammad Azharuddin	1989–1999	174	90	76	2	6	54
13	Sachin Tendulkar	1996–1999	73	23	43	1	6	35
14	Ajay Jadeja	1997–1999	13	8	5	0	0	62
15	Sourav Ganguly	1999–2005	146	76	65	0	5	54
16	Rahul Dravid	2000–2007	79	42	33	0	4	53
17	Anil Kumble	2001	1	1	0	0	0	100
18	Virender Sehwag	2003–2011	12	7	5	0	0	58
19	M.S. Dhoni	2007–2018	200	110	74	5	11	60
20	Suresh Raina	2010–2014	12	6	5	0	1	54
21	Gautam Gambhir	2010–2011	6	6	0	0	0	100
22	Virat Kohli	2013–2021	95	65	27	1	2	70
23	Ajinkya Rahane	2015	3	3	0	0	0	100
24	Rohit Sharma	2017–2025	56	42	12	1	1	75
25	Shikhar Dhawan	2021–2022	12	7	3	0	2	70
26	KL Rahul	2022–2025	15	10	5	0	0	66
27	Hardik Pandya	2023	3	2	1	0	0	67
28	Shubman Gill	2025 –	6	2	4	0	0	33

== See also ==
- List of India test cricketers
- List of India Twenty20 International cricketers
- ICC ODI Championship
- List of cricket terms
- History of cricket
