= 1996 Pepsi Sharjah Cup =

International cricket tournament

- Date: 12–19 April 1996
- Location: Sharjah, United Arab Emirates
- Result: South Africa def. India in final
- Player of the series: Gary Kirsten (SA)
Teams
India	Pakistan	South Africa
Captains
Mohammad Azharuddin	Aamer Sohail	Hansie Cronje
Most runs
Sachin Tendulkar (195)	Aamer Sohail (240)	Gary Kirsten (356)
Most wickets
Anil Kumble (8)	Waqar Younis (7)	Fanie de Villiers (10)

The 1996 Pepsi Sharjah Cup was a cricket tournament in the One Day International format held in Sharjah, United Arab Emirates, from 12 to 19 April 1996. It featured the national cricket teams of South Africa, Pakistan and India. Its official sponsor was Pepsi. The tournament was won by South Africa, which defeated India in the final.

== Tournament ==
The Pepsi Sharjah Cup was the second ODI tournament held after the 1996 Cricket World Cup, held immediately afterwards the 1996 Singer Cup in Singapore, which was won by Pakistan over Sri Lanka and India. The matches were held at the Sharjah Cricket Association Stadium in the emirate of Sharjah. The tournament had a round-robin series of matches, with each team playing the others twice.

== Squads ==
India	Pakistan	South Africa
Mohammad Azharuddin (c); Sachin Tendulkar (c); Rahul Dravid; Ajay Jadeja; Aashish Kapoor; Anil Kumble; Sanjay Manjrekar; Nayan Mongia (wk); Venkatesh Prasad; Venkatapathy Raju; Vikram Rathour; Navjot Singh Sidhu; Javagal Srinath; Prashant Vaidya	Aamir Sohail (c); Ijaz Ahmed; Mushtaq Ahmed; Mohammad Akram; Basit Ali; Saeed Anwar; Inzamam-ul-Haq; Aaqib Javed; Rashid Latif (wk); Salim Malik; Saqlain Mushtaq; Rameez Raja; Ata-ur-Rehman; Waqar Younis	Hansie Cronje (c); Paul Adams; Derek Crookes; Daryll Cullinan; Andrew Hudson; Jacques Kallis; Gary Kirsten; Craig Matthews; Brian McMillan; Shaun Pollock; Jonty Rhodes; Dave Richardson (wk); Pat Symcox; Fanie de Villiers

India named a 14-player side unchanged from the side it fielded in the 1996 Singer Cup. Sandeep Patil served as the team coach-cum-manager. Vikram Rathour made his international debut in the tournament. Pakistan named a 14-player side, unchanged from the squad that won the Singer Cup. Intikhab Alam served as Pakistan's team coach, and Dan Kiesel as the team physiotherapist. Bob Woolmer served as South Africa's team coach. Cassim Docrat was the team manager; Craig Smith was the physiotherapist and Paddy Upton worked as the exercise specialist.

== Points table ==
South Africa won all of their four round-robin matches. India and Pakistan each claimed one victory over the other. Tied at 2 points each, India qualified for the final against South Africa based on superior run-rate.

Team	P	W	L	T	NR	NRR	Points
South Africa	4	4	0	0	0	+1.67	8
India	4	1	3	0	0	−0.53	2
Pakistan	4	1	3	0	0	−1.15	2

== Matches ==
12 April
Scorecard

Pakistan; 271/5 (50 overs)	v	India; 233 (47.2 overs)
Aamir Sohail 105 (127); Sachin Tendulkar 1/46 (10 overs)		Nayan Mongia 69 (78); Mushtaq Ahmed 4/47 (9.2 overs)

Pakistan won by 38 runs
Sharjah Cricket Association Stadium, Sharjah
Umpires: Doug Cowie (NZ) and Mervyn Kitchen (Eng)
Player of the match: Aamir Sohail (Pak)

- India won the toss and chose to field.
- Saeed Anwar (Pak) passed 3,000 runs in ODIs.
- Points: India 0, Pakistan 2

13 April
Scorecard

South Africa; 314/3 (50 overs)	v	Pakistan; 171/7 (50 overs)
Daryll Cullinan 110* (109); Waqar Younis 1/56 (10 overs)		Salim Malik 64 (115); Fanie de Villiers 2/40 (10 overs)

South Africa won by 143 runs
Sharjah Cricket Association Stadium, Sharjah
Umpires: B. C. Cooray (SL) and Doug Cowie (NZ)
Player of the match: Daryll Cullinan (SA)

- South Africa won the toss and chose to bat.
- Andrew Hudson (SA) passed 2,000 runs in ODIs.
- Daryll Cullinan (SA) scored is first century in ODIs.
- Pakistan 0, South Africa 2

14 April
Scorecard

South Africa; 288/6 (50 overs)	v	India; 208/8 (50 overs)
Gary Kirsten 106 (116); Anil Kumble 2/45 (10 overs)		Sanjay Manjrekar 53 (80); Shaun Pollock 3/42 (10 overs)

South Africa won by 80 runs
Sharjah Cricket Association Stadium, Sharjah
Umpires: B. C. Cooray (SL) and Mervyn Kitchen (Eng)
Player of the match: Hansie Cronje (SA)

- South Africa won the toss and chose to bat.
- Prashant Vaidya (Ind) played his last ODI.
- India 0, South Africa 2

15 April
Scorecard

India; 305/5 (50 overs)	v	Pakistan; 277 (46.1 overs)
Sachin Tendulkar 118 (140); Waqar Younis 3/44 (10 overs)		Aamir Sohail 78 (86); Javagal Srinath 3/65 (10 overs)

India won by 28 runs
Sharjah Cricket Association Stadium, Sharjah
Umpires: Doug Cowie (NZ) and Mervyn Kitchen (Eng)
Player of the match: Sachin Tendulkar (Ind)

- India won the toss and chose to bat.
- Vikram Rathour (Ind) made his in ODIs.
- This was the first time that India had scored 300 runs or more in ODIs.
- Pakistan's innings was limited to 48 overs due to their slow over rate.
- India 2, Pakistan 0

16 April
Scorecard

Pakistan; 188 (45 overs)	v	South Africa; 189/2 (33.1 overs)
Aamir Sohail 46 (73); Craig Matthews 3/19 (8 overs)		Andrew Hudson 94* (86); Hansie Cronje 1/23 (4 overs)

South Africa won by 8 wickets
Sharjah Cricket Association Stadium, Sharjah
Umpires: B. C. Cooray (SL) and Mervyn Kitchen (Eng)
Player of the match: Craig Matthews (SA)

- South Africa won the toss and chose to bat.
- Basit Ali played his last ODI.
- Pakistan 0, South Africa 2

17 April
Scorecard

India; 215/8 (50 overs)	v	South Africa; 216/5 (47.1 overs)
Ajay Jadeja 71* (69); Paul Adams 3/30 (10 overs)		Daryll Cullinan 64* (100); Venkatapathy Raju 3/38 (10 overs)

South Africa won by 5 wickets
Sharjah Cricket Association Stadium, Sharjah
Umpires: B.C. Cooray (SL) and Mervyn Kitchen (Eng)
Player of the match: Paul Adams (SA)

- India won the toss and chose to bat.
- Sachin Tendulkar passed 4,000 runs in ODIs.
- India 0, South Africa 2

=== Final ===
19 April
Scorecard

South Africa; 287/5 (50 overs)	v	India; 249/9 (50 overs)
Gary Kirsten 115 (142); Anil Kumble 2/42 (10 overs)		Sachin Tendulkar 57 (71); Hansie Cronje 1/23 (4 overs)

South Africa won by 38 runs
Sharjah Cricket Association Stadium, Sharjah
Umpires: B. C. Cooray (SL) and Mervyn Kitchen (Eng)
Player of the match: Gary Kirsten (SA)

- South Africa won and chose to bat.

== Records and awards ==
South African opening-batsman Gary Kirsten was the top run-scorer of the tournament, amassing 356 runs in 7 innings at an average of 89, with two centuries and one fifty. He was named the player of the series. Pakistani captain Aamir Sohail was the second-highest run getter, scoring 240 runs at an average of 60.

South African fast-bowler Fanie de Villiers took the most number of wickets, taking 10 wickets at an average of 19.20. Indian leg-spin bowler Anil Kumble followed with a haul of 8 wickets at an average of 26.50.
