= 1995–96 Singer Cup =

International cricket tournament

- Date: 1–7 April 1996
- Location: Padang, Singapore
- Player of the series: Sanath Jayasuriya (Sri Lanka)
Teams
India	Pakistan	Sri Lanka
Captains
Mohammad Azharuddin	Amir Sohail	Arjuna Ranatunga
Most runs
Most wickets

The 1996 Singer Cup was a triangular cricket tournament held between 1 and 7 April 1996 in Singapore. The competition featured the national cricket teams of India, Sri Lanka and Pakistan. The tournament was won by Pakistan, which defeated Sri Lanka in the final on 7 April.

== Venue ==
The 1996 Singer Cup was the first major international cricket competition hosted in Singapore. All matches were played at The Padang sports ground, which has been the home of the Singapore Cricket Club.

== Squads ==
Sri Lanka and India retained the captains – Arjuna Ranatunga (Sri Lanka) and Mohammad Azharuddin (India) – who had led their sides in the 1996 World Cup. However, Aamir Sohail replaced Wasim Akram as captain of the Pakistan team.

=== Sri Lanka ===
Sri Lanka named a 14-player side for the tournament, unchanged from the team that won the 1996 World Cup.

- Arjuna Ranatunga (captain)
- Aravinda de Silva (vice-captain)
- Sanath Jayasuriya
- Roshan Mahanama
- Asanka Gurusinha
- Hashan Tillakaratne
- Romesh Kaluwitharana (wicket-keeper)
- Kumar Dharmasena
- Muttiah Muralitharan
- Upul Chandana
- Chaminda Vaas
- Ravindra Pushpakumara
- Marvan Atapattu
- Pramodya Wickremasinghe

=== Pakistan ===
Pakistan named a 14-player side with some major changes from the side that had played in the World Cup. Former captain and fast-bowler Wasim Akram had pulled out of the tournament due to an injury, and veteran batsman Javed Miandad retired after the 1996 World Cup. They were replaced by middle-order batsman Basit Ali and fast-bowler Mohammad Akram.

- Aamir Sohail (captain)
- Saeed Anwar
- Aaqib Javed
- Salim Malik
- Ijaz Ahmed
- Saqlain Mushtaq
- Inzamam-ul-Haq
- Ata-ur-Rehman
- Basit Ali
- Waqar Younis
- Rameez Raja
- Rashid Latif (wicket-keeper)
- Mushtaq Ahmed
- Mohammad Akram

=== India ===
India named a 14-player side that incorporated some major changes. Leading batsman Vinod Kambli and medium-fast bowler Salil Ankola were dropped from the team. They were replaced by medium-fast bowler Prashant Vaidya and batsmen Rahul Dravid and Vikram Rathour. However, Rathour was not picked to play in any match.

- Mohammad Azharuddin (captain)
- Sachin Tendulkar (vice-captain)
- Rahul Dravid
- Prashant Vaidya
- Navjot Singh Sidhu
- Aashish Kapoor
- Sanjay Manjrekar
- Javagal Srinath
- Vikram Rathour
- Anil Kumble
- Venkatapathy Raju
- Ajay Jadeja
- Venkatesh Prasad
- Nayan Mongia (wicket-keeper)

== Points table ==
The opening match on 1 April between Pakistan and Sri Lanka, was abandoned due to rain and re-played on 2 April. At the end of the round-robin matches, each team had one victory and one loss, making their tally of points equal. As a result, the finalists were decided based on superior net run-rate.

Team	P	W	L	T	NR	NRR	Points
Pakistan	2	1	1	0	0	+0.56	2
Sri Lanka	2	1	1	0	0	+0.22	2
India	2	1	1	0	0	−0.46	2

cricinfo

== Matches ==
1 April
Scorecard

Pakistan; 50/3 (10 overs)	v	Sri Lanka –
Aamir Sohail 22 (21); Chaminda Vaas 2/11 (3 overs)

No result
Padang, Singapore
Umpires: Dave Orchard (South Africa) and Russell Tiffin (Zimbabwe)

- Sri Lanka won the toss and elected to field.
- Match abandoned due to rain after 10 overs were bowled. Match was to be restarted on 2 April.

2 April
Scorecard

Sri Lanka; 349/9 (50 overs)	v	Pakistan; 315 (49.4 overs)
Sanath Jayasuriya 134 (65); Waqar Younis 4/62 (10 overs)		Salim Malik 68 (77); Chaminda Vaas 2/50 (10 overs)

Sri Lanka won by 34 runs
Padang, Singapore
Umpires: Dave Orchard (South Africa) and Russell Tiffin (Zimbabwe)
Player of the match: Sanath Jayasuriya (Sri Lanka)

- Pakistan won the toss and elected to field.

3 April
Scorecard

India; 199 (45.4 overs)	v	Sri Lanka; 187 (48.1 overs)
Navjot Singh Sidhu 94 (116); Chaminda Vaas 3/35 (7.4 overs)		Roshan Mahanama 59 (124); Javagal Srinath 4/35 (10 overs)

India won by 12 runs
Padang, Singapore
Umpires: George Sharp (England) and Russell Tiffin (Zimbabwe)
Player of the match: Javagal Srinath (India)

- India won the toss and elected to bat.
- Rahul Dravid made his ODI debut.

5 April
Scorecard

India; 226/8 (47.1 overs)	v	Pakistan; 190/2 (28 overs)
Sachin Tendulkar 100 (111); Saqlain Mushtaq 3/38 (10 overs)		Aamir Sohail 76 * (89); Anil Kumble 1/39 (7 overs)

Pakistan won by 8 wickets (with 30 balls remaining)
Padang, Singapore
Umpires: Dave Orchard (South Africa) and George Sharp (England)
Player of the match: Aamir Sohail (Pakistan)

- India won the toss and chose to bat.
- Pakistan's target was revised to 187 runs from 33 overs due to rain.

=== Final ===
7 April
Scorecard

Pakistan; 215 (48.3 overs)	v	Sri Lanka; 172 (32.5 overs)
Ijaz Ahmed 51 (75); Chaminda Vaas 2/35 (8 overs)		Sanath Jayasuriya 76 (28); Saqlain Mushtaq 3/46 (7 overs)

Pakistan won by 43 runs
Padang, Singapore
Umpires: George Sharp (England) and Russell Tiffin (Zimbabwe)
Player of the match: Saqlain Mushtaq (Pakistan)

- Sri Lanka won the toss and elected to field.

== Records and awards ==
Sanath Jayasuriya, who had been the player of the tournament for the 1996 World Cup, won the same award for the 1996 Singer Cup. He finished the tournament scoring 217 runs in 3 innings with a batting average of 72.33, with one fifty and one century. As a bowler, Jayasuriya had also taken 3 wickets at an average of 38.33 and a best of 1/31.

Several world records were broken during the course of the tournament. In Sri Lanka's opening match against Pakistan, Jayasuriya made what was then the fastest century in ODIs, taking just 48 balls and going on to score 134 runs from 65 balls. Jayasuriya's 48-ball century surpassed the previously held record of India's Mohammad Azharuddin, who had scored a century from 62 balls. In the same match, Aamir Sohail conceded 30 runs in an over he bowled – the world record for most runs made in a single over. Jayasuriya's century became the second-fastest when Pakistani batsman Shahid Afridi scored a century from 37 balls in the first ODI innings of his career, against Sri Lanka in Nairobi, Kenya later in the year.

Sanath Jayasuriya also scored the fastest fifty in ODIs at that time– in 17 balls against Pakistan in the final – surpassing Australia's Simon O'Donnell's 18-ball record, made against Sri Lanka in Sharjah in 1989–90.

Pakistani captain Aamir Sohail made the second-highest number of runs, scoring 140 in 3 innings at an average of 70.00. India's Sachin Tendulkar was the only other batsman after Jayasuriya to score a century – making 100 runs against Pakistan.

The tournament's leading wicket-taker was Pakistani spin bowler Saqlain Mushtaq, who took a total of 8 wickets at an average of 16.2 and a best of 3/38. Sri Lanka's Muttiah Muralitharan shared the record of taking most catches along with Pakistani wicket-keeper Rashid Latif, both taking 4 catches.
