= Salil Ankola =

Indian cricket player (born 1968)

Personal information
- Full name: Salil Ashok Ankola
- Born: 1 March 1968 (age 58); Solapur, Maharashtra, India
- Height: 185 cm (6 ft 1 in)
- Batting: Right-handed
- Bowling: Right-arm fast
- Role: Bowler

International information
- National side: India
- Only Test (cap 186): 15 November 1989 v Pakistan
- ODI debut (cap 72): 18 December 1989 v Pakistan
- Last ODI: 13 February 1997 v South Africa

Domestic team information
- Years: Team
- 1988–1990: Maharashtra
- 1990–1997: Mumbai

Career statistics
Competition	Test	ODI	FC	LA
Matches	1	20	54	75
Runs scored	6	34	707	325
Batting average	6.00	3.77	15.71	11.60
100s/50s	0/0	0/0	0/1	0/0
Top score	6	9	63	43*
Balls bowled	180	807	8656	3329
Wickets	2	13	181	70
Bowling average	64.00	47.30	25.33	32.82
5 wickets in innings	0	0	8	0
10 wickets in match	0	0	0	0
Best bowling	1/35	3/33	6/47	4/22
Catches/stumpings	0/–	12/0	22/0	18/–
- Source: ESPNcricinfo, 11 March 2013

Salil Ashok Ankola (born 1 March 1968) is a former international cricketer who played one Test match and 20 One Day Internationals (ODIs) from 1989 to 1997 for India. A right-arm fast-medium bowler, he played first-class cricket for Mumbai, regularly opening the bowling. Ankola's consistency for Mumbai team earned him a spot for representing India during their tour of Pakistan in 1989–90. After the first Test match at Karachi, he was dropped for the subsequent matches in the series owing to injuries. After a brief phase of playing first-class cricket, Ankola was called for the Indian ODI team during 1993, eventually led to being a part of the 1996 Cricket World Cup. At 28, Ankola retired from international cricket to pursue acting. Since then he went on to appear in a number of Indian soap operas and a few Hindi films. In 2020, he was selected as the chief selector of the Mumbai Cricket Association. He was a selector of the National team from January 2023 till August 2024.

== Cricketing career ==
=== Early achievements ===
Born in 1968 into a south Indian Konkani-speaking family which hails from the town of Ankola in Uttara Kannada district of Karnataka, Salil Ankola made his first-class debut at the age of 20 for Maharashtra in 1988–89. Playing against Gujarat he scored 43 runs and took a six-wicket haul (six wickets in an innings) that included a hat-trick. He followed with another six-wicket haul; six wickets for 51 runs in an innings against Baroda. Overall, he collected 27 wickets at an average of 20.18 including three five wicket hauls during the season. Owing to the consistent performances during the season, Ankola caught the attention of the selectors, as he was selected for the India's tour of Pakistan in 1989–90. In a warm up match against BCCP Patron's XI he took six wickets for 77 runs in the first innings and collecting two more wickets in the second innings, thus taking his tally to eight wickets.

=== First class cricket ===
Ankola made his Test debut during the first test of the tour at Karachi, alongside Sachin Tendulkar and Waqar Younis, both would go on to become successful cricketers later in their careers. In a match that was drawn, Ankola took two wickets for 128 runs. Injuries sustained thereafter and prevented him from appearing in the remaining Tests of the series.

Soon after the Test series, that was drawn, Ankola was called for the ODI series. He made his ODI debut in the second of the three-match series; the first ODI was abandoned due to bad lights. Ankola picked up two wickets conceding 26 runs. He arrived at number 10 in the second innings at a stage where India needed 15 runs of one over. Ankola hit a six of the first ball that he faced off Imran Khan but eventually ended on the losing side. In the next match, he bowled just 2.3 overs (15 balls) before the match was called off due to crowd disruption. Despite being selected in the Test squads on domestic series and overseas tours, he never got an opportunity to play for the team. Being dropped from the team without getting a game was known in cricket circles as being "Ankolad". However, Ankola continued to play ODI cricket. In the early 1990s, he along with other bowlers such as Abey Kuruvilla, Paras Mhambrey, Nilesh Kulkarni and Sairaj Bahutule was trained under Frank Tyson. Ankola mainly worked on altering his style rather than pace.

During this period, Ankola married Parineeta; the couple has two children—a daughter and a son.

After a period of three years, Ankola was selected for the Charms Cup against England and Zimbabwe at home. In a match against South Africa during the 1993 Hero Cup, he captured three wickets for 33 runs, which remained his career-best bowling figures in ODIs.

In 1996, Ankola was selected in the Indian team for the World Cup. In the tournament he played just one match against Sri Lanka. In a match that India lost, he conceded 28 runs off five overs without claiming any wicket. Shortly after the World Cup, the selectors with immediate effect dropped Ankola along with Vinod Kambli and all-rounder Manoj Prabhakar—all were a part of the squad earlier—for the Singer cup and Pepsi Sharjah Cup. Ankola was replaced by medium-fast bowler Prashant Vaidya. However, Ankola was subsequently selected for the Indian team that toured South Africa in 1996—97. Despite being a part of the squad, he was never given a chance to represent the playing XI in any of the Test matches. Following the Test series, he was picked up for the Standard Bank International ODI tournament; he played five games in the tournament against South Africa and Zimbabwe. In the finals against South Africa that India lost, Ankola conceded 50 runs in seven overs in what became his last match; the spell included a catch being taken off a no-ball and a dropped chance. The tour remained his last in international cricket as he was never selected for the team again. Following that, Ankola declared his retirement from international cricket the same year.

=== Post retirement contributions to cricket ===
In March 2010, BCCI granted Ankola a benefit matchTwenty20 benefit match between Sachin Tendulkar XI and Sourav Ganguly XI at the Andheri Sports Complex, Mumbai. The squad included Ankola himself along with Mahendra Singh Dhoni, captain of the Indian national cricket team then. A writer noted that, "Salil Ankola is indeed fortunate. Not many players get to witness an unexpected visitor in the form of the current India captain turning up for his benefit match".

In 2020, Salil Ankola was selected as the chief selector of the Mumbai Cricket Association. He was selector of the National team from January 2023 till August 2024.

== Acting career ==
After retiring from cricket, Ankola shifted his focus towards entering films. He made his acting debut with Zee TV serial Chahat aur Nafrat. He made his film debut with 2000 Hindi-language film Kurukshetra, where he played the role of a cop accompanying his senior officer played by Sanjay Dutt. He followed that with Pitaah (2002), and his last major release Chura Liyaa Hai Tumne (2003) featured him alongside Esha Deol and Zayed Khan. The following year he acted in Silence Please...The Dressing Room, where he played the character of a cricket captain. The film did not fare well at the box-office, nonetheless Ankola's performance was highly appreciated. He also participated in the first season of Bigg Boss, Indian version of the reality show Big Brother in 2006. Prior to that, he acted in the Indian soap opera titled Karam Apna Apna, where he signed a contract with Balaji Telefilms that "[Ankola] would not act in any television show on any channel apart from those produced by Balaji Films". Since he appeared in Bigg Boss before the contract would expire—one year from June 2006—the Bombay High Court ordered him not to act in any TV shows on other channels that are considered rivals for Sony Television. Ssshhhh...Koi Hai and Kora Kagaz are some of the other TV shows that he has acted in.

In February 2013, Salil was seen as Savitri's father in the daily show Savitri but was replaced by Shahbaz Khan in August 2013 after a revamp of the show.

=== Filmography ===
- 2000: Kurukshetra
- 2002: Pitaah
- 2003: Chura Liyaa Hai Tumne
- 2004: Silence Please...The Dressing Room
- 2012: Riwayat
- 2018: Tera Intezaar
- 2019: Ekta
- 2021: The Power
- 2024: Pambattam (Tamil)

=== Television ===
Year	Name	Role	Notes	Ref
1997–1999	Chahat Aur Nafrat	Vishal		
1997	Saturday Suspense	Tenent		
1998–2000	Lekin... Woh Sach Tha			
1998–1999	Kora Kagaz	Ravi		
1999	Rishtey			
2000–2001	Noorjahan	Yusuf Chak		
2002–2005	Kehta Hai Dil	Ranveer Rathore / Sandeep Jain / Shakti Singh		
2003	Ssshhhh...Koi Hai	Vikral		
2003–2004	Vikraal Aur Gabraal	Vikraal		
2005	Zindagi Teri Meri Kahani			
2005–2006	CID	Senior Inspector Akshay		
2006	Ak...tion Unlimited Josh			
2006	Fear Factor India	Contestant		
2006	Bigg Boss 1	Contestant	Ejected, Day 6	
2006–2009	Karam Apnaa Apnaa	Mahen Kapoor		
2009–2010	Pyaar Ka Bandhan	Vikram		
2013	Savitri - EK Prem Kahani	Maharaj		
2013	Savdhaan India	Kunal Singh		
2014	Box Cricket League 1	Contestant		
2015	Power Couple 1	Contestant	with second wife Ria	
2016–2018	Karmaphal Daata Shani	Surya Dev		
2020	Devi Adi Parashakti	Surya Dev		
2022	Kitchen Kallakar	Contestant	Winner	

== Background and personal life ==
Salil was born in 1968 into a Karnataka Konkani-speaking family which hails from the town of Ankola in Uttara Kannada district of Karnataka.

In 2008, it was reported that Ankola has been suffering from depression and was enrolled in a rehabilitation centre in Pune. The reason behind the illness was believed to be his severe addiction to alcohol. As a result of this his wife Parineeta decided to settle with her parent in Pune with their children, leaving Ankola isolated.

After his recovery in January 2010, Ankola sent a legal notice to his wife demanding mutual consent for separation. His wife responded that, "there was [no] problem or a marital breakdown ... wanted to work on a reconciliation, not divorce." Ankola, when asked about reconciliation, said he was not willing to do so. The couple finally got divorced in 2011. On 22 December 2013, Parineeta's body was found hanging from the ceiling fan of her room at her residence in Geeta Society, Salisbury Park, in Pune.

== See also ==
- One Test Wonder
