= Kora Kagaz (TV series) =

Indian Hindi television series

- Directed by: Asha Parekh
- Starring: Renuka Shahane; Salil Ankola; Amit Behl
- Opening theme: "Zindagi Kuch To Bata" by Sadhana Sargam
- Country of origin: India
- Original language: Hindi
- No. of episodes: 169

Production
- Producer: Asha Parekh
- Running time: approx. 30 minutes
- Production company: Akruti Productions

Original release
- Network: STAR Plus
- Release: 27 October 1998 – 17 January 2002

Kora Kagaz (Blank Paper) is an Indian television series which ran on Star Plus from 27 October 1998 until 17 January 2002. It was directed by Asha Parekh. The series had 169 episodes which starred Renuka Shahane, Salil Ankola and Amit Behl. The serial was first telecasted on every Tuesday at 8.30 pm IST and later shifting to every Thursday at 9 pm IST.

== Synopsis ==
The wedding of Mahesh and Pooja is held with all the pomp and tradition associated with Indian weddings. The night after the wedding, Pooja, a nervous bride, waits for her husband to join her. He comes very late, and when he does, it is to tell her that he is in love with another girl. He tells Pooja bluntly that he never wanted to marry her in the first place and walks out, leaving behind a distraught and confused young bride trying to come to grips with this new reality.

Pooja refuses to return to her parents. She continues to reside with Mahesh's family, consisting of his parents and younger brother Ravi. She decides to continue her studies, find a job and get her life back together again. All members of Mahesh's family are supportive and well-disposed towards Pooja. They were unaware of his affair with the other girl. In particular, Pooja gets tremendous moral and emotional support from her brother-in-law Ravi, and an attraction forming between them becomes evident as the serial progresses. Where will this attraction lead them, and what does Pooja do when Mahesh suddenly arrives back into her life?

What does Pooja do? What choices does she make? Will she find fulfillment?

== Cast ==
- Renuka Shahane as Pooja
- Salil Ankola as Ravi
- Amit Behl as Mahesh
- Anil Dhawan as Naresh, The father of Ravi and Mahesh
- Uttara Baokar as Sharda, The mother of Ravi and Mahesh
- Smita Bansal as Priya
- Arpita Pandey / Shweta Gautam as Yogita
- Grusha Kapoor as Shalini
- Ashalata as Tania, Pooja's mother
- S. M. Zaheer as Krishnakant, Pooja's father
- Kamlesh as Anil
- Sonam Malhotra as Naseem
- Iira Soni as Varsha
- Dhawal Barbhaya/Jagdeep as Ramkishan, Varsha's father
- Dilip Joshi as Pratap Varsha's brother
- Rakesh Thareja as Anand
- Vishwanath/Ashfaq Khan as Karan, Pooja's brother
- Anuj Saxena as Dr. Deepak
- Nagendra as Advocate Vijay Khanna
- Sudhir Mitoo as Satish Kulkarni
- Gauri Tonk as Shraddha
- Sunita Rajwan as Sarita
- Imran Mallick Sher Khan
- Chand Dhar as Jagdish, Anand's father
- Archana as Geeta, Priya's friend
- Meena Nathani as Anuja, Pooja's college principal
- Ishtiaque Khan as Shami's father
- Kanika Shivpuri as Shami's mother
- Soumya Arya as Shadab
- Shri Vallabh Vyas as Monk
- Arfan Khan as Irfan
- Vikrant as Salim
- Lata Haya as Naseem's Aunty
- Madhavi Gogate as Sangita Anand's Mother
- Eva Grover as Sneha
- Dev as Mr. Kriplani
- Prashant as Kuber, Pooja's cousin
- Inder Kohli as Kabir, Ravi's friend
- Rakesh Chouhan as Raj, Ravi's friend
- Dinkar Verma as Rakesh, Inder's friend
- Dinesh Hakku as Jai, Ravi's Boss
- Anita Pawal as Ananya, Shalini's Mother
