= Atul Wassan =

Indian cricketer (born 1968)

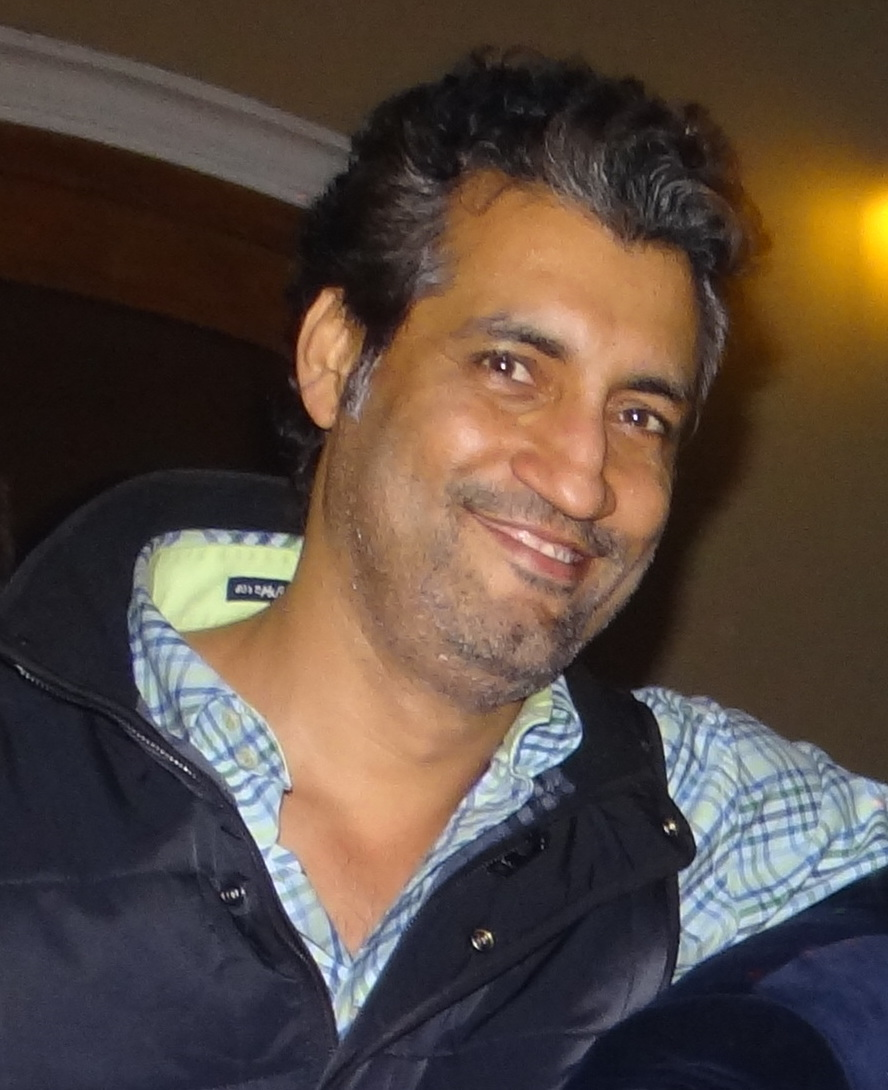
- Wassan in 2011

Personal information
- Full name: Atul Satish Wassan
- Born: 23 March 1968 (age 58); Delhi, India
- Batting: Right-handed
- Bowling: Right-arm fast-medium

International information
- National side: India
- Test debut (cap 190): 2 February 1990 v New Zealand
- Last Test: 23 August 1990 v England
- ODI debut (cap 76): 1 March 1990 v New Zealand
- Last ODI: 4 January 1991 v Sri Lanka

Career statistics
Competition	Test	ODI
Matches	4	9
Runs scored	94	33
Batting average	23.50	8.25
100s/50s	0/1	0/0
Top score	53	16
Balls bowled	712	426
Wickets	10	11
Bowling average	50.39	25.72
5 wickets in innings	0	0
10 wickets in match	0	n/a
Best bowling	4/108	3/28
Catches/stumpings	1/–	2/–
Medal record
Men's Cricket
Representing India
ACC Asia Cup
Winner	1990–91 India
- Source: ESPNcricinfo, 4 February 2006

Atul Satish Wassan (born 23 March 1968) is a former Indian cricketer. After retirement, he has become a cricket commentator. He played four Tests and nine One Day Internationals for India, however due to injuries his career was cut short and he became a television pundit. He was a part of the Indian squad which won the 1990–91 Asia Cup.

Atul Wassan is an alumnus of Guru Harkrishan Public School in Vasant Vihar, Delhi and was recognized for his cricketing talent at school.
