= Prashant =

Prashant or Prasant is a common male name in South Asia. It is derived from the word "shanth" which means patience, calm, quiet, or tranquil.

== People with the given name ==
- Prashant Awasthi (cricketer) - Indian domestic cricketer.
- Prashant Awasthi (footballer) - Nepalese footballer.
- Prashant Bamb - Indian politician.
- Prashant Bhargava - Indian-American filmmaker and designer.
- Prashant Bhushan - Indian lawyer, activist and politician.
- Prashant Bose - Indian politician.
- Prashant Damle - Indian actor.
- Prashant Jagtap - Indian politician.
- Prashant K. Jain - Indian-born American scientist.
- Prashant Kishor - Indian politician and political strategist.
- Prashant Khemka - Indian businessperson.
- Prashant Kore - Indian domestic cricketer.
- Prashant Kumar - Indian judge.
- Prashant Kumar (cricketer) - Indian domestic cricketer.
- Squadron Leader Prashant Kumar Bundela - Indian fighter pilot of the Indian Air Force.
- Prashant Kumar Mishra - Judge of the Supreme Court of India.
- Prashant More - Indian carrom player.
- Prashant Naik - Indian domestic cricketer.
- Prashant Nair - Indian film director, screenwriter and producer.
- Prashant Narayanan - Indian actor.
- Prashant P. Sharma - Indian-American invertebrate biologist.
- Prashant Pandey - Indian screenwriter, lyricist, and director.
- Prashant Pathak - Canadian investor, businessman and philanthropist.
- Prashant Pillai - Indian music composer.
- Prashant Prabhakar - Indian-German actor.
- Prashant Raj - Indian film director and screenwriter.
- Prashant Raj Sachdev - Indian model and actor.
- Prashant Ranade -
- Prashant Singh Rawat - Indian basketball player.
- Prashant Shah - Bollywood producer.
- Prashant Sharma - Indian politician.
- Prashant Shenoy - Indian-American Computer Scientist.
- Prashant Shetty - Indian actor, film director and producer.
- Prashant Singh - Indian politician.
- Prashant Solanki - Indian domestic cricketer.
- Prashant Tamang - Indian singer and film actor.
- Prashant Thakur - Indian politician.
- Prashant V. Kamat - Professor of chemistry and biochemistry and a principal scientist of the radiation laboratory.
- Prashant Upreti - Nepalese politician.
- Prashant Vashist - Indian domestic cricketer.
- Prashant Vaidya - Indian domestic cricketer.
- Prashant Yadaorao Padole - Indian politician.

== Variations ==
- Prasanth Nair - Indian air commodore and flight instructor.
- Prashanta Nanda - Indian film actor.
- Prashanth - Indian actor.
- Prashanth Nair - Indian-born American cricketer.
- Prashanthini - Indian playback singer.
- Prashanth Neel - Indian film director and screenwriter.
- Vishal Prashant - Indian politician.
