= Atul Bedade =

Indian cricketer (born 1966)

Personal information
- Born: 24 June 1966 (age 60); Bombay, India
- Batting: Left-handed
- Bowling: Right-arm medium

International information
- National side: India
- ODI debut (cap 90): 13 April 1994 v United Arab Emirates
- Last ODI: 11 November 1994 v West Indies

Career statistics
Competition	ODI	First-class
Matches	13	64
Runs scored	158	3,136
Batting average	22.57	33.36
100s/50s	0/1	10/15
Top score	51	159
Balls bowled	–	374
Wickets	–	2
Bowling average	–	70.50
5 wickets in innings	–	0
10 wickets in match	–	0
Best bowling	–	1/6
Catches/stumpings	4/–	26/–
- Source: ESPNcricinfo, 7 March 2006

Atul Chandrakant Bedade (born 24 June 1966) is a former Indian cricketer. He played domestic cricket for Baroda and represented India in 13 One Day Internationals, making his debut versus UAE at Sharjah in 1994.

He was credited to be a big hitter of the cricket ball and an attacking batsman. In the early 90s there was a call in Indian cricketing circles for a batsman who could hit hard and therefore Bedade got his chance. However the pressure to hit sixes on him was too much and although he did show his ability in the same series against Pakistan in Sharjah (India lost that match), his hitting was few and far between in the other chances given to him and therefore he was soon dropped and never given a chance again.

== Later career ==
Bedade has continued to remain involved with cricket in different capacities. In 2006, he was the only ex-India player among the thirty five former first-class cricketers who took the umpires' examination which was being promoted by the Board of Control for Cricket in India (BCCI) for former cricketers. Seven years later, in 2013, Bedade scripted another 'first' by becoming the only ex-India player to pass the BCCI's Curators' Certification Course, and that too with flying colours. Bedade also holds a double coaching certificate from the BCCI – National Cricket Academy.

== Politics ==
In September 2010, Bedade contested the Vadodara Municipal Corporation election on a Bharatiya Janata Party (BJP) ticket from ward number 20. Bedade has been actively involved with the BJP, and was also a key member of the Krida Bharti, the sports wing of the Rashtriya Swayamsevak Sangh (RSS).
