= Kiran More =

Indian cricketer

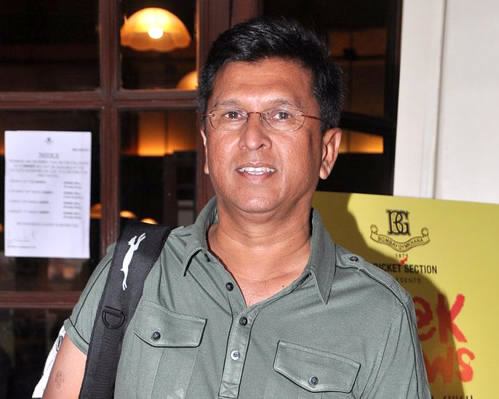
- More in 2012

Personal information
- Full name: Kiran Shankar More
- Born: 4 September 1962 (age 64); Baroda, Gujarat, India (Present day Vadodara, Gujarat, India)
- Height: 175 cm (5 ft 9 in)
- Batting: Right-handed
- Bowling: Right arm leg spin
- Role: Wicket-keeper

International information
- National side: India (1984–1993)
- Test debut (cap 173): 4 June 1986 v England
- Last Test: 9 August 1993 v Sri Lanka
- ODI debut (cap 50): 5 December 1984 v England
- Last ODI: 5 March 1993 v England

Domestic team information
- Years: Team
- 1980/81–1997/98: Baroda

Career statistics
Competition	Test	ODI	FC	LA
Matches	49	94	151	145
Runs scored	1,285	563	5,223	1,151
Batting average	25.70	13.09	31.08	15.98
100s/50s	0/7	0/0	7/29	0/2
Top score	73	42*	181*	82
Balls bowled	12	0	245	24
Wickets	0	–	1	1
Bowling average	–	–	180.00	20.00
5 wickets in innings	–	–	0	0
10 wickets in match	–	–	0	0
Best bowling	–	–	1/18	1/14
Catches/stumpings	110/20	63/27	303/63	97/41
Medal record
Men's Cricket
Representing India
ACC Asia Cup
Winner	1988 Bangladesh
Winner	1990–91 India
- Source: CricketArchive, 30 September 2008

Kiran Shankar More (/kɪrən moʊreɪ/) (born 4 September 1962) is an Indian former cricketer and wicket-keeper for the Indian cricket team from 1984 to 1993. He also took up the position Chairman of the Selection Committee of the BCCI till Dilip Vengsarkar took over the job in 2006. In July 2019, he was appointed in a senior consultancy role for the United States national cricket team. He was a part of the Indian squad which won the 1988 Asia Cup and the 1990–91 Asia Cup.

== Early career ==
More played for the India Under-19 team in the late 1970s. He played for Tata Sports Club in the Times Shield in Bombay and for Barrow in the North Lancashire League in 1982. He toured West Indies as the understudy to Syed Kirmani in 1982–83 without playing in a Test.

More played two major innings for Baroda in the Ranji Trophy in 1983–84 – 153* against Maharashtra and 181* against Uttar Pradesh. On the latter occasion, he added 145 for the last wicket with Vasudev Patel, which stood as a Ranji record for nearly a decade. Baroda qualified for the semifinal before losing to Delhi. More appeared in two One Day Internationals against England in 1984–85.

== International cricket ==
More toured Australia with the Indian team in 1985–86. When an injury in an early match of the World Series Cup virtually ended the international career of Kirmani, More played in the remaining matches of the tournament. This tour starting in late 1985 is not to be confused with the famous winning tour for the World Championship of Cricket in early 1985, also in Australia. From then till 1993, More was the first choice as the wicket keeper for India in Tests. In one day matches, he often lost the place to wicket keepers who were better batsmen.

More's first Test series, against England in 1986, was his most successful. He took 16 catches in three Tests – an Indian record against England – and came second in the batting averages. More was a small, busy batsman who often played important innings when the regular batsmen failed. He scored 50 at Barbados against West Indies in 1988–89 when India lost the first six wickets for 63, and 58* against Pakistan at Karachi when India were struggling to save the follow-on. More considered the Karachi innings the best of his career. Against West Indies at Madras in 1988–89, he stumped six batsmen, five of them in the second innings, both of which remain as Test records.

== 1990 and after ==
More was selected as Mohammad Azharuddin's vice captain in the team that toured New Zealand in 1989–90. In the second Test at Napier he scored his highest score of 73. He lost the vice captaincy to Ravi Shastri later that year in England. In the Lord's Test, More dropped the English opener Graham Gooch when he was 36, who went on to score 333 runs. In the 1992 World Cup More was involved in a minor controversy when his constant appealing led Javed Miandad to mockingly leap up and down, apparently imitating More.

By early 1994, he lost his place in the Indian team to his Baroda teammate Nayan Mongia. More played purely as a batsman for the state side when both were available. He captained Baroda till 1998.

More started the Kiran More-Alembic cricket academy in 1997. He was the Chairman of selectors for the Indian team from 2002 to 2006.

During his tenure as the Chairman of the Selection Committee he vowed to encourage and promote young cricketers by creating room for them in the Indian Cricket team by removing old and experienced players. Sourav Ganguly was dropped by Kiran More Committee and reportedly said Saurav Ganguly will never bat again as long as Kiran More is in selection Committee. Later Vengsarkar team selected Saurav Ganguly and Ganguly went on to make his maiden double hundred against Pakistan and a 1000+ test runs in a calendar year proving Kiran More was wrong.

He was appointed as talent scout for Mumbai Indians

== Filmography ==
=== Film ===
- M.S. Dhoni: The Untold Story
- Aryan (1988 film)

=== Television ===
- Tamanna (2016)

Preceded by Syed Kirmani	Chairman, Selection Committee; October 2004 – September 2006	Succeeded by Dilip Vengsarkar
