= Lee Germon =

New Zealand cricketer (born 1968)

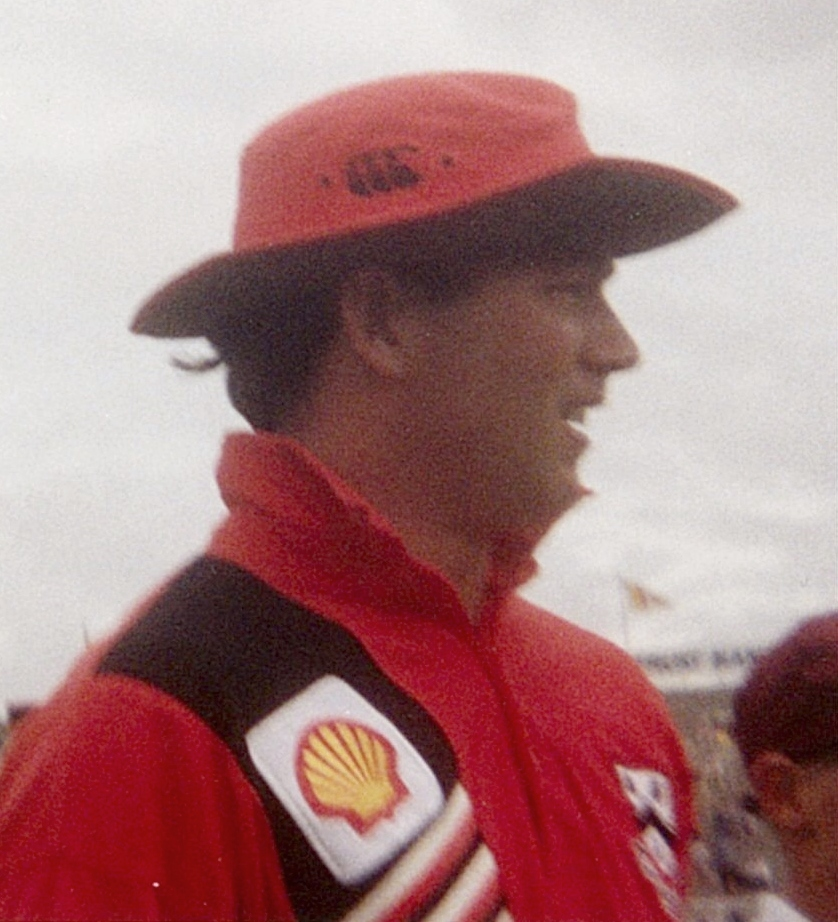
- Germon in 1993

Personal information
- Full name: Lee Kenneth Germon
- Born: 4 November 1968 (age 58); Christchurch, New Zealand
- Batting: Right-handed
- Bowling: Right arm leg break
- Role: Wicket-keeper-batter

International information
- National side: New Zealand (1994–1997)
- Test debut (cap 193): 18 October 1995 v India
- Last Test: 10 February 1997 v England
- ODI debut (cap 92): 8 December 1994 v Sri Lanka
- Last ODI: 4 March 1997 v England

Domestic team information
- Years: Team
- 1987/88–1997/98: Canterbury
- 2000/01–2001/02: Otago

Career statistics
Competition	Test	ODI	FC	LA
Matches	12	37	103	136
Runs scored	382	519	3,123	1,586
Batting average	21.22	19.96	29.18	19.34
100s/50s	0/1	0/3	4/10	0/7
Top score	55	89	160*	89
Balls bowled	0	0	10	6
Wickets	–	–	1	0
Bowling average	–	–	12.00	–
5 wickets in innings	–	–	0	–
10 wickets in match	–	–	0	–
Best bowling	–	–	1/12	–
Catches/stumpings	27/2	21/9	258/26	119/28
- Source: Cricinfo, 4 May 2017

Lee Kenneth Germon (born 4 November 1968) is a sporting body administrator and former New Zealand cricketer, wicket-keeper and former captain. He played for the provinces of Canterbury and Otago and is the most successful Canterbury cricket captain of the modern era. He was made captain of the New Zealand Cricket team on his Test match debut. He holds the unofficial record for the most runs (70), from a single over in first-class cricket.

== Domestic career ==
Germon made his first class debut as a 19-year-old, playing for Canterbury against Auckland at Lancaster Park on 5 January 1988. He became captain of the underperforming Canterbury team, succeeding Rod Latham on 31 December 1990.

Under Germon's leadership, Canterbury won in the New Zealand one day game, winning the Shell Cup 50 over competition in 1991/92, 1992/93, 1993/94, 1995/96 & 1996/97. Canterbury also won the New Zealand first class competition, the Shell Trophy, under his captaincy in 1993/94, and 1997/98, (while Canterbury also won the Shell Trophy during the 1996/97 season, Germon did not actually captain the Canterbury team in the Shell Trophy this year), Canterbury also won the one off New Zealand Action cricket trophy in 1992 (Action cricket was a forerunner to Twenty20 and Cricket Max).

At the time of his retirement from the Canterbury Team, Germon held records for dismissals for Canterbury, with 238 in 76 first class matches. As a batsman he had scored 2336 first class runs at an average of 30.74.

Germon's final match for Canterbury was the 1997/98 Shell Trophy final which Canterbury won against Northern Districts. In this match, Germon shared in a record breaking batting partnership, when he added 160 runs with Warren Wisneski for the tenth wicket, setting the Wellington first-class record for a tenth wicket partnership, Germon made 80 runs in his final innings. He retired from cricket after the match, aged 29.

In the early 1990s Germon was continually overlooked for the New Zealand team despite his wicket keeping and captaincy abilities.

During season 1993/94 Germon led Canterbury to victory in both one day and four day competitions and scored a 100 not out playing for a New Zealand XI against the visiting Pakistan team in January 1994. After this season Germon entered the New Zealand team.

=== First Class ===
- Germon captained Canterbury a record 49 times in first class cricket, surpassing Graham Dowling (43).
- He finished having passed 3,000 first-class runs in his final innings. He holds almost all the Canterbury wicketkeeping records.
- Most dismissals in an innings: 6 v Northern Districts, Chch, 1992–93. Most dismissals in a match: 9 v Northern Districts, Chch, 1992–93.
- Most dismissals in a season: 34 (31c, 3s), 1991–92.
- Most dismissals in career: 238 (217c, 21s).

==== Shell Cup ====
- Most dismissals in a match: 5 v Otago, Chch 1988–89.
- Most dismissals in a career: 96 (78c, 18s).

== International career ==
Germon was not selected for New Zealand's 1994 winter tour to England, but was included in the 1994/95 tour to South Africa when he was taken as cover for wicketkeeper/batsman Adam Parore. On this tour Germon made his ODI debut for New Zealand on 8 December against Sri Lanka in a rain affected match at Goodyear Park, Bloemfontein; he kept wicket while Parore played as a specialist batsman. Germon played very little cricket on the tour.

1994/95 was New Zealand's cricket's centenary season, and it proved a disaster for the New Zealand cricket team. At its conclusion New Zealand broadcaster Murray Deaker commented that the only good thing you could say about it from the New Zealand cricket point of view was that it only came once every hundred years. Marred by substandard performances, disciplinary problems and a cannabis smoking scandal, the season proved a watershed in New Zealand cricket and Glenn Turner was introduced as new coach in 1995, as New Zealand cricket sought about changing the culture within the New Zealand cricket team.

Turner, upon deciding that Ken Rutherford would be replaced as captain, appointed Germon, recognising that he had the best captaincy record in New Zealand domestic cricket at the time. Prior to making Germon captain and wicketkeeper, Turner assessed Germon's wicket keeping abilities consulting with former New Zealand wicketkeepers Barry Milburn and Ian Smith, who both considered Germon to be the best wicketkeeper in New Zealand at that time. Former New Zealand captain and then senior squad member Martin Crowe also stated to Turner that he thought Germon as better at wicket-keeping than incumbent wicketkeeper Adam Parore.

Germon played 12 Test matches and 37 ODIs for New Zealand. Germon's captaincy career lasted less than 2 years. His first test was against India in October 1995, a match which New Zealand lost by 8 wickets. Germon distinguished himself in the match, top scoring for New Zealand in both innings, making 48 and 41 runs respectively.

=== Captaincy ===
While New Zealand did not have significant success under his leadership, a steady improvement was made on the performances of the 1994/95 season. Germon's only Test win as captain came in November 1996 when he captained New Zealand to its first Test victory over Pakistan in 26 years, in Pakistan.

ESPN cricinfo rates Germon's one day cricket captaincy success rate at 44.44%; this is below his successor Stephen Fleming's 48.04% success rate, but represented an improvement on Ken Rutherford's 30% success rate. Germon's New Zealand team won only one ODI series, against Zimbabwe, however they won 15 games and drew two.

Germon's first one-day series in charge was against India, in India, and it resulted in a closely contested series win to India, three games to two.

He captained New Zealand to its first ever one day victories in the West Indies in 1996, in a closely fought one day series which NZ lost three games to two. There were also series draws against Pakistan in New Zealand 1995/1996 (two all) and England in New Zealand in 1997 (two all).

He led New Zealand to the final of the 1996 Sharjah Cup competition, defeating competition from new world champions Sri Lanka. New Zealand lost in the final to Pakistan.

He led New Zealand to the quarter-final of the 1996 World Cup, where despite scoring their highest ever total against Australia (to that point) with 286, they lost. Germon scored his highest ODI score of 89 in that match and finished the 1996 World Cup with a batting average of 63.66, the highest of any New Zealander and any wicketkeeper in the tournament.

Along with coach Glenn Turner, Germon had wanted to make significant changes to the culture of the New Zealand team He was faced with opposition from some high-profile players. There was much dissension in the New Zealand team in the tour of the West Indies in 1996, it has been suggested by New Zealand journalists that Chris Cairns and Adam Parore faked injuries to leave the tour early. After the tour Glenn Turner was deposed by New Zealand cricket. It is widely believed that this conflict with high-profile players along with loss of form led to Germon's sudden dismissal from the New Zealand team in 1997.

While Germon's form had slumped, (in Turner's era he had averaged 25 in ODI's with the bat, and 26.80 in Tests), in his last ODI against England he made 4 dismissals, former New Zealand wicket keeper Ian Smith said that he had "kept like a dream" His dismissal from the New Zealand team was highly controversial. It caused protest, especially in Canterbury. New Zealand convenor of selectors of the time Ross Dykes admitted to receiving hate mail and anonymous phone calls over the issue.

Germon is one of the few wicketkeepers who has played over ten Tests and affected more dismissals than conceded byes. He effected 29 dismissals in Test cricket and conceded 24 byes.

=== Post captaincy ===
Lee Germon was replaced as New Zealand captain by his Canterbury teammate Stephen Fleming, a player he had tipped as a player for the future in the 1993 Who’s who of New Zealand cricket.

After initially retiring from cricket in 1998 Germon was persuaded to return by his former Canterbury coach Denis Aberhart and former New Zealand coach Glenn Turner to play cricket for Otago. Germon played for an underperforming Otago team as a batsman between 2000 and 2002. He chose to play for Otago citing the fresh challenge it offered him. Germon played as a batsman only and did not match his previous heights as a player.

== After cricket ==
In 1998 Germon became the South Island development manager for the Bank of New Zealand before moving on to work at St Andrew's College as its development officer in 2000. In 2004 Germon shifted to Mainland Soccer as chief executive officer for what turned out to be only a 10-month stint before moving to Nelson to become CEO of the Tasman Rugby Union. In 2009 he returned to his home city of Christchurch to become CEO of Canterbury Cricket. Staying in cricket administration, Germon became CEO of the Australian T20 Big Bash League cricket franchise Sydney Thunder in 2017, before becoming CEO of Cricket New South Wales in 2019.

Sporting positions
Preceded by Ken Rutherford	New Zealand national cricket captain 1995–1997	Succeeded by Stephen Fleming
