= Saradindu Mukherjee =

Indian cricketer (born 1964)

Cricket information
- Batting: Right-handed
- Bowling: Right-arm Off-Break
Medal record
Men's Cricket
Representing India
ACC Asia Cup
Winner	1990–91 India
- Source: CricInfo, 6 March 2006

Saradindu Mukherjee (born 5 October 1964) is a former Indian cricketer. He played domestic cricket for Bengal and played three One Day Internationals for India in 1990–91.

He is remembered for his heroics in the 1990-91 Asia Cup, which he won with his national side, where he was India's preferred spinner in the tournament, ahead of Venkatapathy Raju and Ravi Shastri. Mukherjee conceded 3.37 runs an over in the tournament from 29 overs. Despite being the most miserly of the Indian bowlers, he never played for India again. Of all Indian bowlers who have bowled 75 balls since 1990, Mukherjee has been the most economical. He was part of the IPL Bangla commentary team in the 11th edition of the tournament.

Saradindu Mukherjee is also credited for having taken a hat-trick on his Ranji Trophy debut.
