= 1990–91 Asia Cup =

Cricket tournament in India

- Dates: 25 December 1990 – 4 January 1991
- Administrator: Asian Cricket Council
- Cricket format: One Day International
- Tournament format: Round-robin
- Host: India
- Champions: India (3rd title)
- Runners-up: Sri Lanka
- Participants: 3
- Matches: 4
- Player of the series: Not awarded
- Most runs: (Sri Lanka) Arjuna Ranatunga (166)
- Most wickets: (India) Kapil Dev (9)

The 1990–91 Asia Cup was the fourth Asia Cup tournament, and was held in India between 25 December 1990, and 4 January 1991. Three teams took part in the tournament: India, Sri Lanka and Asian leading associate member Bangladesh. Pakistan had pulled out of the tournament due to strained political relations with India.

The 1990–91 Asia Cup was a round-robin tournament where each team played the other once, and the top two teams qualifying for a place in the final. India and Sri Lanka qualified for the final in which India beat Sri Lanka by 7 wickets to win its second consecutive (and third in total) Asia Cup.

== Squads ==
Squads
India (2)	Sri Lanka (7)	Bangladesh (15)
Mohammad Azharuddin (c)	Arjuna Ranatunga (c)	Minhajul Abedin (c)
Ravi Shastri	Hashan Tillakaratne (wk)	Azhar Hossain(vc)
Navjot Singh Sidhu	Charith Senanayake	Nurul Abedin
Sanjay Manjrekar	Asanka Gurusinha	Faruk Ahmed
Sachin Tendulkar	Aravinda de Silva	Athar Ali Khan
Kapil Dev	Roshan Mahanama	Akram Khan
Manoj Prabhakar	Sanath Jayasuriya	Enamul Haque
Kiran More (wk)	Rumesh Ratnayake	Aminul Islam
Venkatapathy Raju	Champaka Ramanayake	Gholam Nousher
Saradindu Mukherjee	Don Anurasiri	Nasir Ahmed (wk)
Atul Wassan	Jayananda Warnaweera	Jahangir Alam Talukdar
Woorkeri Raman	Graeme Labrooy	Saiful Islam
-	Pramodya Wickramasinghe	-

== Venues ==
Kolkata	Cuttack	Chandigarh
Eden Gardens	Barabati Stadium	Sector 16 Stadium
Capacity: 67,000	Capacity: 45,000	Capacity: 30,000
1990–91 Asia Cup (India)

== Matches ==
=== Group stage ===
Pos	Team	Pld	W	L	NR	Pts	NRR	Qualification
1	Sri Lanka	2	2	0	0	8	4.908	Advanced to the Final
2	India (H)	2	1	1	0	4	4.222	Advanced to the Final
3	Bangladesh	2	0	2	0	0	3.663	Eliminated

Source: ESPN Cricinfo
(H) Host

25 December 1990
Scorecard

Bangladesh; 170/6 (50 overs)	v	India; 171/1 (36.5 overs)
Faruk Ahmed 57 (126); Kapil Dev 2/17 (8 overs)		Navjot Sidhu 104 (109); Athar Ali Khan 1/23 (6 overs)

India won by 9 wickets
Sector 16 Stadium, Chandigarh
Umpires: V. K. Ramaswamy (Ind) and Piloo Reporter (Ind)
Player of the match: Navjot Sidhu (Ind)

- Bangladesh won the toss and elected to bat.
- Saradindu Mukherjee (Ind) made his ODI debut.

28 December 1990
Scorecard

Sri Lanka; 214 (49.2 overs)	v	India; 178 (45.5 overs)
Arjuna Ranatunga 53 (105); Atul Wassan 3/28 (10 overs)		Mohammad Azharuddin 40 (61); Rumesh Ratnayake 3/24 (6.5 overs)

Sri Lanka won by 36 runs
Barabati Stadium, Cuttack
Umpires: Subrata Banerjee (Ind) and V. K. Ramaswamy (Ind)
Player of the match: Arjuna Ranatunga (SL)

- Sri Lanka won the toss and elected to bat.

31 December 1990
Scorecard

Sri Lanka; 249/4 (45 overs)	v	Bangladesh; 178/9 (45 overs)
Aravinda de Silva 89 (60); Azhar Hossain 1/33 (9 overs)		Athar Ali Khan 78* (95); Sanath Jayasuriya 3/39 (9 overs)

Sri Lanka won by 71 runs
Eden Gardens, Kolkata
Umpires: Subrata Banerjee (Ind) and Piloo Reporter (Ind)
Player of the match: Athar Ali Khan (Ban)

- Sri Lanka won the toss and elected to bat.
- Saiful Islam (Ban) and Pramodya Wickramasinghe (SL) made their ODI debuts.
- Fog delayed start of play. The match was subsequently reduced to 45 overs-a-side.
- Bangladesh surpassed their previous team aggregate of 177. Athar Ali Khan's 78 was the highest individual score for a Bangladesh player.

=== Final ===
4 January 1991
Scorecard

Sri Lanka; 204/9 (45 overs)	v	India; 205/3 (42.1 overs)
Arjuna Ranatunga 49 (57); Kapil Dev 4/31 (9 overs)		Sanjay Manjrekar 75* (95); Arjuna Ranatunga 1/12 (2 overs)

India won by 7 wickets
Eden Gardens, Calcutta
Umpires: V. K. Ramaswamy (Ind) and Piloo Reporter (Ind)
Player of the match: Mohammad Azharuddin (Ind)

- India won the toss and elected to field.
- Kapil Dev became the second bowler for India to take a hat-trick in ODIs.

== Statistics ==
=== Most runs ===
Player	Matches	Innings	NO	Runs	Average	SR	HS	100	50
(Sri Lanka) Arjuna Ranatunga	3	3	1	166	83.00	73.45	64*	0	2
(India) Navjot Sidhu	3	3	1	144	72.00	81.45	104*	1	0
(Sri Lanka) Aravinda de Silva	3	3	0	126	42.00	120.00	89	0	1
(Bangladesh) Athar Ali Khan	2	2	1	122	122.00	71.34	78*	0	1
(India) Sanjay Manjrekar	3	3	2	112	112.00	65.88	75*	0	1
Source: Cricinfo

=== Most wickets ===
Player	Matches	Innings	Wickets	Overs	Ave.	Econ.	BBI	4WI	5WI
(India) Kapil Dev	3	3	9	26.2	10.66	3.64	4/31	1	0
(India) Atul Wassan	3	3	5	27.00	20.80	3.85	3/28	0	0
(Sri Lanka) Rumesh Ratnayake	2	2	4	14.5	14.50	3.91	3/24	0	0
(Sri Lanka) Sanath Jayasuriya	3	3	3	20.00	30.33	4.55	2/39	0	0
Source: Cricinfo

== See also ==
- Asia Cup
