= Sultan Zarawani =

Former Emirati cricketer

Personal information
- Full name: Sultan Mohammed Zarawani
- Born: 24 January 1961 (age 65); Dubai
- Batting: Right-handed
- Bowling: Right-arm leg spin

International information
- National side: United Arab Emirates (1994–1996)
- ODI debut (cap 11): 13 April 1994 v India
- Last ODI: 1 March 1996 v Netherlands

Career statistics
Competition	ODI	List A
Matches	7	11
Runs scored	26	53
Batting average	4.33	7.57
100s/50s	0/0	0/0
Top score	13	20*
Balls bowled	264	312
Wickets	5	5
Bowling average	51.40	62.00
5 wickets in innings	0	0
10 wickets in match	0	0
Best bowling	2/49	2/49
Catches/stumpings	1/–	1/–
- Source: Cricinfo, 10 December 2009

Sultan Mohammed Zarawani (Arabic: سلطان محمد زاروني; born 24 January 1961) is a former Emirati cricketer. He played seven one-day internationals (ODIs). After the 1996 Cricket World Cup, he was banned for life when he criticised the officials of the Emirates Cricket Board. Zarawani had learnt the basics of the sport while studying at his school in Pakistan.

== International career ==
In the early 1990s, when the Emirates Cricket Board adopted a policy of recruiting expatriate cricketers from Pakistan, India and Sri Lanka for the national team. Zarawani, the sole native Emirati in the team, was appointed as captain.

Under his leadership, the UAE won the 1994 ICC Trophy in Kenya which earned them qualification for the 1996 Cricket World Cup. He also captained the UAE in their first-ever One Day International match which was played against India. Although his team was defeated, Zarawani did manage to capture one wicket – that of Sachin Tendulkar.

Prior to playing in his first World Cup tournament in 1996, he had received three operations on his knees and also underwent regular cortisone injections in order to enable him to play through the pain. He also spent 24 hours in bed before every match to make himself fit to play. He led at the age of 35. Despite the blow on his head in UAE's opening match against South Africa, he continued to play in the remainder of the tournament and also went onto lead the team throughout the global showpiece. Under his leadership, UAE finished the tournament by securing a victory over fellow qualifier Netherlands; it turned out to be Zarawani's last appearance in international cricket.

The only locally produced player on the 1996 team, Zarawani was purportedly held in very high esteem by his teammates, of whom there were allegedly fewer than the pricey motor cars in his possession.

He left the international game with ODI batting and bowling averages of 4.33 and 51.40 respectively. "Swap the figures round, as they say, and you'd have one hell of an allrounder," mused Lawrence Booth.

=== Head injury ===
Zarawani is best known for facing South African fast bowler Allan Donald wearing a sunhat rather than a helmet at the 1996 Cricket World Cup and being hit by a fierce bouncer. Zarawani had come to bat when UAE were 68/6, chasing 322 runs.

Donald recorded in his autobiography that he feared initially that he had killed him. Despite the blow, Zarawani continued to refuse the offer of a helmet but only lasted six more balls before he was dismissed and taken straight to hospital.
