= Prashant Vaidya =

Indian cricketer (born 1967)

Cricket information
- Batting: Right-handed
- Bowling: Right-arm fast-medium
Medal record
Men's Cricket
Representing India
ACC Asia Cup
Winner	1995 United Arab Emirates
- Source: CricInfo, 6 March 2006

Prashant Vaidya (born 23 September 1967) is a former Indian cricketer. He played domestic cricket for Bengal and played four One Day Internationals for India in 1995 and 1996. At that time he was considered to be the fastest bowler in India. He was a part of the Indian squad which won the 1995 Asia Cup.

He was instrumental in developing the Vidarbha Cricket Association coaching academy.

Currently, Prashant Vaidya serves as the president of the inaugural edition of the professional Vidarbha Pro T20 League (VPTL).
