= Zimbabwean cricket team in South Africa in 1999–2000 =

The Zimbabwe national cricket team toured South Africa in October and November 1999 and played one Test match against the South Africa national cricket team. They also competed in the 2000 Standard Bank Triangular Tournament in January and February, playing six One Day International (ODI) matches against South Africa and England. This was the first time that Zimbabwe had toured to South Africa, although teams from both Zimbabwe and Rhodesia had played in South Africa as part of South African domestic cricket. (Note: Rhodesia first played in the Currie Cup, the South African first-class cricket competition, in 1904/05 and played regularly in the competition from 1946/47 until independence in 1980. Zimbabwean teams played in South African domestic competitions occasionally in the mid-1990s and in 2007/08.)

Immediately before Zimbabwe travelled to South Africa they had played a Test and ODI series against Australia who had toured Zimbabwe for the first time. The matches saw Zimbabwe defeated heavily. After the single Test match in South Africa the South Africans travelled to Zimbabwe and played a return Test match at Harare with only a fortnight separating the matches.

South Africa won the Test match convincingly and Zimbabwe finished last in the ODI tournament. At the end of the ODI tournament England travelled to Zimbabwe to play four ODIs against Zimbabwe.with only a fortnight separating the matches.

== Tour party ==
The Zimbabwe team was captained by Alistair Campbell. This was Campbell's last Test as captain of Zimbabwe; he resigned a week after the Test match and was replaced, initially in an interim role, by Andy Flower. Fast bowler Heath Streak, who had originally been selected for the tour, was injured and replaced by Andy Blignaut. Blignaut then pulled a muscle whilst practicing and was replaced by Pommie Mbangwa. Leg-spinner Paul Strang was injured and unavailable for the tour. David Mutendera was the only uncapped member of the tour party but did not play in the Test match.

- Alistair Campbell (captain)
- Andy Flower
- Grant Flower
- Murray Goodwin
- Trevor Gripper
- Neil Johnson
- Pommie Mbangwa
- David Mutendera
- Henry Olonga
- Gavin Rennie
- Bryan Strang
- Andy Whittall
- Guy Whittall

The South African team was captained by Hansie Cronje.

== Test match ==
The Test match was the first to be played at Springbok Park in Bloemfontein and only the second between the two countries. Zimbabwe had been soundly beaten by Australia and without Streak and Paul Strang were fielding a weakened team. They were reduced to 79/6 before a half-century by Guy Whittall restored some respectability, although their score of 192 "looked woefully inadequate". South Africa scored 417 against the weakened Zimbabwean bowling attack, with Neil Johnson, who had gone into the match with an injury, unable to bowl more than two overs for the visitors. Jonty Rhodes top-scored with 70 runs for South Africa whilst Hansie Cronje became the leading South African run scorer in Test matches during his innings of 64.

Zimbabwe again lost their first six wickets for a low score, 123 in this instance, before the tail-end batsmen were able to add runs against Paul Adams' spin bowling, Whittall scoring his second half-century of the match. Adams finished with four wickets as Zimbabwe were bowled out for 212, losing the match by an innings and 13 runs on the fourth day.

29 October–1 November 1999	Zimbabwe	v	South Africa	South Africa won by an innings and 13 runs
Scorecard; Wisden report	192 (75 overs); GJ Whittall 85 (114 balls); SM Pollock 5/39 (21 overs)		417 (150.1 overs); JN Rhodes 70 (138 balls); HK Olonga 4/93 (33.1 overs)	Springbok Park, Bloemfontein; Umpires: RS Dunne and DL Orchard; Player of the match: JH Kallis (South Africa)
Scorecard; Wisden report	212 (71.1 overs); GJ Whittal 51 (91 balls); PR Adams 4/31 (12.1 overs)			Springbok Park, Bloemfontein; Umpires: RS Dunne and DL Orchard; Player of the match: JH Kallis (South Africa)
South Africa won the toss and chose to field.; The match was scheduled for five days but completed in four.; HH Dippenaar made his Test debut for South Africa

== Standard Bank Triangular Tournament ==
During January and February 2000 Zimbabwe returned to South Africa to play in the 2000 Standard Bank Triangular Tournament, a One Day International series played between Zimbabwe, South Africa and England, who had just completed a tour of South Africa. The matches were all played over 50-overs with four of Zimbabwe's six matches played under floodlights. South Africa were considered by far the strongest of the three teams and started the tournament as clear favourites.

Heath Streak returned to the Zimbabwe squad for the tournament having recovered his fitness. Gary Brent, Stuart Carlisle, Everton Matambanadzo and Craig Wishart all returned to the squad, with Trevor Gripper, David Mutendera, Gavin Rennie and Bryan Strang all being left out. Andy Flower retained the captaincy.

After losing to South Africa in the opening match of the tournament, Henry Olonga "destroyed" England's batting in the second match. Olonga, who was the first black Zimbabwean to play for the national team aged 17 in 1995, took six wickets for 19 runs in the match, his best bowling figures in List A cricket. Zimbabwe won the match by 102 runs but lost to England in their next match before narrowly beating South Africa by two wickets in the second meeting between the two teams, Heath Streak scoring the winning run off the last ball of the innings after Andy Flower and Guy Whittall had put on 91 runs in a record Zimbabwean 7th wicket partnership.

After each team had played four matches Zimbabwe were top of the table on run rate, each team having won two and lost two of their matches. A loss to South Africa in the third meeting between the teams, left their final match against England, the last of the group stage, as a winner-takes-all semi-final, the winner qualifying for the final. The match was rained off and England qualified on net run rate for the final where they lost to South Africa.

21 January 2000	Zimbabwe; 226 (49.5 overs)	v	South Africa; 229/4 (48.1 overs)	South Africa won by 6 wickets
(D/N); Scorecard; Wisden report	Zimbabwe; 226 (49.5 overs)	v	South Africa; 229/4 (48.1 overs)	New Wanderers Stadium, Johannesburg; Umpires: SB Lambson and CJ Mitchley; Player of the match: WJ Cronje (South Africa)
(D/N); Scorecard; Wisden report	MW Goodwin 73 (71 balls); SM Pollock 3/31 (9.5 overs)		WJ Cronje 83* (112 balls); NC Johnson 2/61 (10 overs)	New Wanderers Stadium, Johannesburg; Umpires: SB Lambson and CJ Mitchley; Player of the match: WJ Cronje (South Africa)
Zimbabwe won the toss and chose to bat.				New Wanderers Stadium, Johannesburg; Umpires: SB Lambson and CJ Mitchley; Player of the match: WJ Cronje (South Africa)

28 January 2000	Zimbabwe; 211/7 (50 overs)	v	England; 107 (34.2 overs)	Zimbabwe won by 104 runs
(D/N); Scorecard; Wisden report	Zimbabwe; 211/7 (50 overs)	v	England; 107 (34.2 overs)	Newlands Cricket Ground, Cape Town; Umpires: IL Howell and CJ Mitchley; Player of the match: HK Olonga (Zimbabwe)
(D/N); Scorecard; Wisden report	NC Johnson 97 (131 balls); GA Hick 1/25 (4 overs)		CMW Read 23 (40 balls); HK Olonga 6/19 (8.2 overs)	Newlands Cricket Ground, Cape Town; Umpires: IL Howell and CJ Mitchley; Player of the match: HK Olonga (Zimbabwe)
Zimbabwe won the toss and chose to bat.				Newlands Cricket Ground, Cape Town; Umpires: IL Howell and CJ Mitchley; Player of the match: HK Olonga (Zimbabwe)

30 January 2000	Zimbabwe; 161/9 (50 overs)	v	England; 162/2 (32.1 overs)	England won by 8 wickets
Scorecard; Wisden report	Zimbabwe; 161/9 (50 overs)	v	England; 162/2 (32.1 overs)	De Beers Diamond Oval, Kimberley; Umpires: SB Lambson and DL Orchard; Player of the match: MA Ealham (England)
Scorecard; Wisden report	HH Streak 35* (65 balls); MA Ealham 5/15 (10 overs)		NV Knight 72* (94 balls); HH Streak 1/26 (7.1 overs)	De Beers Diamond Oval, Kimberley; Umpires: SB Lambson and DL Orchard; Player of the match: MA Ealham (England)
Zimbabwe won the toss and chose to bat.				De Beers Diamond Oval, Kimberley; Umpires: SB Lambson and DL Orchard; Player of the match: MA Ealham (England)

2 February 2000	South Africa; 222/7 (50 overs)	v	Zimbabwe; 223/8 (50 overs)	Zimbabwe won by 2 wickets
(D/N); Scorecard; Wisden report	South Africa; 222/7 (50 overs)	v	Zimbabwe; 223/8 (50 overs)	Kingsmead, Durban; Umpires: WA Diedricks and DL Orchard; Player of the match: A Flower (Zimbabwe)
(D/N); Scorecard; Wisden report	L Klusener 65* (84 balls); GB Brent 2/32 (10 overs)		A Flower 59 (91 balls); HS Williams 3/38 (10 overs)	Kingsmead, Durban; Umpires: WA Diedricks and DL Orchard; Player of the match: A Flower (Zimbabwe)
South Africa won the toss and chose to bat.				Kingsmead, Durban; Umpires: WA Diedricks and DL Orchard; Player of the match: A Flower (Zimbabwe)

6 February 2000	South Africa; 204/7 (50 overs)	v	Zimbabwe; 151 (46 overs)	South Africa won by 53 runs
Scorecard; Wisden report	South Africa; 204/7 (50 overs)	v	Zimbabwe; 151 (46 overs)	St George's Oval, Port Elizabeth; Umpires: DF Becker and RE Koertzen; Player of the match: JH Kallis (South Africa)
Scorecard; Wisden report	JH Kallis 98* (132 balls); GB Brent 2/48 (10 overs)		NC Johnson 56 (82 balls); SM Pollock 3/7 (8 overs)	St George's Oval, Port Elizabeth; Umpires: DF Becker and RE Koertzen; Player of the match: JH Kallis (South Africa)
South Africa won the toss and chose to bat.				St George's Oval, Port Elizabeth; Umpires: DF Becker and RE Koertzen; Player of the match: JH Kallis (South Africa)

9 February 2000	England	v	Zimbabwe	Match abandoned without a ball bowled
(D/N); Scorecard	England	v	Zimbabwe	SuperSport Park, Centurion; Umpires: DF Becker and CJ Mitchley
No toss.				SuperSport Park, Centurion; Umpires: DF Becker and CJ Mitchley

== Other matches ==
Zimbabwe played two one-day warm up matches against South African teams at the start of the One Day International series. Before the series began they played Northerns, losing by eight runs. After their first ODI against South Africa they played another match against Boland, winning by five wickets.

19 January 2000	Northerns; 251 (50 overs)	v	Zimbabweans; 243 (50 overs)	Northerns won by 8 runs
Scorecard	Northerns; 251 (50 overs)	v	Zimbabweans; 243 (50 overs)	Centurion Park, Centurion, Gauteng; Umpires: SB Lambson and JD Cloete
Scorecard	G Dros 102 (133 balls); HH Streak 3/26 (10 overs)		ADR Campbell 77 (111 balls); GJ Smith 3/49 (10 overs)	Centurion Park, Centurion, Gauteng; Umpires: SB Lambson and JD Cloete
Northerns won the toss and chose to bat.				Centurion Park, Centurion, Gauteng; Umpires: SB Lambson and JD Cloete

26 January 2000	Boland; 141 (42.2 overs)	v	Zimbabweans; 142/5 (42.2 overs)	Zimbabweans won by 5 wickets
Scorecard	Boland; 141 (42.2 overs)	v	Zimbabweans; 142/5 (42.2 overs)	Boland Bank Park, Paarl; Umpires: MVF Jamieson and F van Eeden
Scorecard	CD de Lange 25 (46 balls); GB Brent 3/16 (6 overs)		SV Carlisle 56 (100 balls); CM Willoughby 3/26 (10 overs)	Boland Bank Park, Paarl; Umpires: MVF Jamieson and F van Eeden
Boland won the toss and chose to bat.				Boland Bank Park, Paarl; Umpires: MVF Jamieson and F van Eeden
