= South African cricket team in Zimbabwe in 1999–2000 =

The South African national cricket team toured Zimbabwe in November 1999 and played a single Test match against the Zimbabwean national cricket team. The tour took place immediately after Zimbabwe had visited South Africa to play their first Test match in the country with only a fortnight separating the matches. South Africa had previously played one Test match in Zimbabwe in 1995 and had visited the country to play a single One Day International in 1992 soon after the end of the apartheid era sporting boycott of South Africa, although teams from Zimbabwe and Rhodesia had previously played in South African domestic cricket competitions, including during the apartheid era. (Note: Rhodesia first played in the Currie Cup, the South African first-class cricket competition, in 1904/05 and played regularly in the competition from 1946/47 until independence in 1980. Zimbabwean teams played in South African domestic competitions occasionally in the mid-1990s and in 2007/08.)

South Africa won the Test match convincingly, recording their biggest victory and Zimbabwe's heaviest Test defeat in the process. Later in the summer Zimbabwe returned to South Africa to play in the 2000 Standard Bank Triangular Tournament, a series of One Day Internationals against England and South Africa, before England toured Zimbabwe for a four-match ODI series. The Test match was the only game South Africa played in Zimbabwe and the team returned home immediately after the match was completed.

== Tour party ==
Following their convincing victory at Bloemfontein at the beginning of the month, the South African selectors named the same team on 2 November. The team was captained by Hansie Cronje and had twelfth man Nicky Boje as a replacement. Both Gary Kirsten and Herschelle Gibbs were unavailable as the result of injuries. The same 11 players took to the field in Harare as had done at Bloemfontein.

- Hansie Cronje (captain)
- Shaun Pollock (vice-captain)
- Paul Adams
- Adam Bacher
- Nicky Boje
- Mark Boucher
- Daryll Cullinan
- Boeta Dippenaar
- Allan Donald
- Jacques Kallis
- Lance Klusener
- Jonty Rhodes

Zimbabwe were captained by Andy Flower following Alistair Campbell's resignation only 48 hours before the start of the match. Flower had captained the team before Campbell and was reinstated for the match. The Zimbabwean team was also unchanged from the match at Bloemfontein with key bowlers Heath Streak and Paul Strang both unavailable through injury. The team had suffered heavy defeats to Australia earlier in the summer as well as the loss at Bloemfontein and, Wisden reported, were suffering from low morale as a result of these results and an ongoing pay dispute.

== Test match ==
The match was played at the refurbished Harare Sports Club. The toss was won by South Africa who chose to bowl first on a pitch which had "quite a bit of grass left on it" (Note: A pitch with more grass on it is more likely to favour seam bowling attacks as the ball is likely to deviate when it bounces. South Africa's opening bowling attack of Allan Donald and Shaun Pollock was much more experienced and effective than the Zimbabwe bowling attack. The match was the fourth at Harare Sports Club during 1999 which created some problems preparing a higher quality pitch.) and favoured the experienced South African bowling attack.

The first day was cut short with only 23 overs possible. (Note: Play stops in Test matches due to rain, bad light or wet ground conditions. Due to the need to play in good light conditions, it is not always possible to bowl a full allocation of overs (usually 90) during a days play. In this case, rain was responsible for the loss of overs.) Writing in Wisden, Geoffrey Dean was of the view that the match began in "conditions overwhelmingly favouring the bowlers" and a combination of the conditions, the "helpful pitch" and "injudicious strokes" by Zimbabwean batsmen saw the home team bowled out for only 102 runs by lunch on day two. The total was Zimbabwe's lowest in Test matches at the time; John Ward considered that the "brilliant" bowling of the South African attack and the low confidence of Zimbabwe's batsmen as well as the pitch and conditions were the causes of the batting collapse.

South Africa scored 492 runs in reply, with centuries for Mark Boucher and Jacques Kallis. Although the pitch was still helpful to bowlers, Zimbabwe's bowling were less consistent or effective and the South African batsmen more experienced – Kallis' hundred was described as "masterful" whilst Boucher, who went in as a nightwatchman towards the end of the second day, scored 125, the highest score made by a nightwatchman in Test cricket at the time. (Note: As of December 2019 Boucher's score remains the second highest by a nightwatchman in Test matches. It was beaten by Australia's Jason Gillespie who scored 201 not out against Bangladesh in 2006.) Boucher and Shaun Pollock put on 148 runs for the eighth South African wicket, a new eighth wicket record for the country, and South Africa declared before the start of play on the fourth day, leaving Zimbabwe requiring 390 runs to make South Africa bat again with two whole days play remaining.

The Zimbabwean second innings lasted only 3 1/2 hours, with the team dismissed for 148 runs. The Zimbabwean batting was described in Wisden as "dispirited and inept", although Ward considered that the South Africa's bowlers were "dominant", with Donald taking Grant Flower's wicket with an unplayable delivery with only the second ball of the innings. The result was Zimbabwe's worst defeat in Test cricket, with South Africa winning by an innings and 219 runs, their biggest Test match victory. The player of the match was awarded jointly to Boucher and Pollock.

11–14 November 1999	Zimbabwe	v	South Africa	South Africa won by an innings and 219 runs
Scorecard; Wisden report	102 (46.5 overs); N Johnson 20 (69 balls); SM Pollock 4/32 (17 overs)		462/9 declared (154 overs); MV Boucher 125 (236 balls); BC Strang 3/92 (38 overs)	Harare Sports Club, Harare; Umpires: RB Tiffin and DB Hair; Player of the match: SM Pollock and MV Boucher (South Africa)
Scorecard; Wisden report	141 (50.5 overs); GJ Rennie 34 (59 balls); SM Pollock 3/23 (16 overs)			Harare Sports Club, Harare; Umpires: RB Tiffin and DB Hair; Player of the match: SM Pollock and MV Boucher (South Africa)
South Africa won the toss and chose to field.; The match was scheduled for five days but completed in four.
