= 2000 Standard Bank Triangular Tournament =

- Part of English cricket team in South Africa in 1999–2000 and Zimbabwean cricket team in South Africa in 1999–2000
- Date: 21 January–13 February 2000
- Location: South Africa
- Result: South Africa won the triangular tournament
- Player of the series: Shaun Pollock (SA)
Teams
| England | South Africa | Zimbabwe |
Captains
| Nasser Hussain | Hansie Cronje | Andy Flower |
Most runs
| Nick Knight (258) | Jacques Kallis (290) | Neil Johnson (232) |
Most wickets
| Darren Gough (14) | Shaun Pollock (14) | Henry Olonga (10) |

The 2000 Standard Bank Triangular Tournament was a cricket tournament played in South Africa from 21 January to 13 February 2000. The three teams involved were South Africa, England and Zimbabwe. Each team played the others three times, with the two teams that won the most games playing each other in a final match. South Africa beat England by 38 runs in the final to win the competition.

== 1st Match: South Africa v Zimbabwe ==
21 January 2000 (D/N)
Scorecard

| Zimbabwe; 226 (49.5 overs) | v | South Africa; 229/4 (48.1 overs) |
| Murray Goodwin 73 (71); Shaun Pollock 3/31 (9.5 overs) | | Hansie Cronje 83* (112); Neil Johnson 2/61 (10 overs) |

South Africa won by 6 wickets
New Wanderers Stadium, Johannesburg
Umpires: Barry Lambson (SA) and Cyril Mitchley (SA)
Player of the match: Hansie Cronje (SA)

- Zimbabwe won the toss and elected to bat.
- Pieter Strydom (SA) made his ODI debut.

== 2nd Match: South Africa v England ==
23 January 2000
Scorecard

| South Africa; 184 (49.5 overs) | v | England; 185/1 (39.3 overs) |
| Jacques Kallis 57 (105); Darren Gough 4/29 (10 overs) | | Nasser Hussain 85 (114); Nicky Boje 1/47 (10 overs) |

England won by 9 wickets
Goodyear Park, Bloemfontein
Umpires: Danzel Becker (SA) and Dave Orchard (SA)
Player of the match: Darren Gough (Eng)

- South Africa won the toss and elected to bat.
- Chris Read, Vikram Solanki, Graeme Swann (all Eng) and David Terbrugge (SA) made their ODI debuts.

== 3rd Match: South Africa v England ==
26 January 2000 (D/N)
Scorecard

| South Africa; 204/7 (50 overs) | v | England; 203/9 (50 overs) |
| Jacques Kallis 43 (70); Darren Gough 3/36 (10 overs) | | Chris Adams 42 (69); Lance Klusener 2/34 (10 overs) |

South Africa won by 1 run
Newlands Cricket Ground, Cape Town
Umpires: Wilf Diedricks (SA) and Rudi Koertzen (SA)
Player of the match: Jacques Kallis (SA)

- South Africa won the toss and elected to bat.

== 4th Match: England v Zimbabwe ==
28 January 2000 (D/N)
Scorecard

| Zimbabwe; 211/7 (50 overs) | v | England; 107 (34.2 overs) |
| Neil Johnson 97 (131); Graeme Hick 1/25 (4 overs) | | Chris Read 23 (40); Henry Olonga 6/19 (8.2 overs) |

Zimbabwe won by 104 runs
Newlands Cricket Ground, Cape Town
Umpires: Ian Howell (SA) and Cyril Mitchley (SA)
Player of the match: Henry Olonga (Zim)

- Zimbabwe won the toss and elected to bat.

== 5th Match: England v Zimbabwe ==
30 January 2000
Scorecard

| Zimbabwe; 161/9 (50 overs) | v | England; 162/2 (32.1 overs) |
| Heath Streak 35* (65); Mark Ealham 5/15 (10 overs) | | Nick Knight 72* (94); Heath Streak 1/26 (7.1 overs) |

England won by 8 wickets
De Beers Diamond Oval, Kimberley
Umpires: Barry Lambson (SA) and Dave Orchard (SA)
Player of the match: Mark Ealham (Eng)

- Zimbabwe won the toss and elected to bat.

== 6th Match: South Africa v Zimbabwe ==
2 February 2000 (D/N)
Scorecard

| South Africa; 222/7 (50 overs) | v | Zimbabwe; 223/8 (50 overs) |
| Lance Klusener 65* (84); Gary Brent 2/32 (10 overs) | | Andy Flower 59 (91); Henry Williams 3/38 (10 overs) |

Zimbabwe won by 2 wickets
Kingsmead, Durban
Umpires: Wilf Diedricks (SA) and Dave Orchard (SA)
Player of the match: Andy Flower (Zim)

- South Africa won the toss and elected to bat.
- Neil McKenzie (SA) made his ODI debut.

== 7th Match: South Africa v England ==
4 February 2000 (D/N)
Scorecard

| England; 231/6 (50 overs) | v | South Africa; 233/8 (49.4 overs) |
| Nick Knight 64 (111); Shaun Pollock 2/36 (10 overs) | | Jonty Rhodes 42 (51); Mark Alleyne 3/55 (10 overs) |

South Africa won by 2 wickets
Buffalo Park, East London
Umpires: Ian Howell (SA) and Rudi Koertzen (SA)
Player of the match: Mark Alleyne (Eng)

- South Africa won the toss and elected to field.

== 8th Match: South Africa v Zimbabwe ==
6 February 2000
Scorecard

| South Africa; 204/7 (50 overs) | v | Zimbabwe; 151 (46 overs) |
| Jacques Kallis 98* (132); Gary Brent 2/48 (10 overs) | | Neil Johnson 56 (82); Shaun Pollock 3/7 (8 overs) |

South Africa won by 53 runs
St George's Oval, Port Elizabeth
Umpires: Danzel Becker (SA) and Rudi Koertzen (SA)
Player of the match: Jacques Kallis (SA)

- South Africa won the toss and elected to bat.

== 9th Match: England v Zimbabwe ==
9 February 2000 (D/N)
Scorecard

| England | v | Zimbabwe |

Match abandoned without a ball bowled
SuperSport Park, Centurion
Umpires: Danzel Becker (SA) and Cyril Mitchley (SA)

- No toss.

== Final: South Africa v England ==
13 February 2000 (D/N)
Scorecard

| South Africa; 149 (45 overs) | v | England; 111 (38 overs) |
| Hansie Cronje 56 (113); Andy Caddick 4/19 (9 overs) | | Craig White 16 (44); Shaun Pollock 5/20 (9 overs) |

South Africa won by 38 runs
New Wanderers Stadium, Johannesburg
Umpires: Rudi Koertzen (SA) and Dave Orchard (SA)
Player of the match: Shaun Pollock (SA)

- England won the toss and elected to field.
