= Matambanadzo =

Matambanadzo is a surname. Notable people with the surname include:

- Darlington Matambanadzo (born 1976), Zimbabwean cricketer
- Everton Matambanadzo (born 1976), Zimbabwean cricketer
- Isabella Matambanadzo (born 1973), Zimbabwean writer, gender and feminist activist
- Masango Matambanadzo (1964–2020), Zimbabwean politician
