= Eaglesvale Senior School =

Location
- 147 Gleneagles Road, Willowvale; Harare; Zimbabwe; 17°52′24″S 30°57′56″E

Information
- Type: Independent, boarding and day school
- Motto: Diens (Afrikaans: Service)
- Religious affiliation: Christianity
- Established: 30 January 1911
- Founders: Rev. A.J. Botha; Rev. J.N. Geldenhuys
- Oversight: RCZ Daisyfield Trust
- Headmaster: Dennis Anderson
- Forms: 1-4, 5, Sixth Form
- Gender: Co-educational
- Enrollment: 466 (2016)
- Student to teacher ratio: 25:1 approx.
- Houses: Gryphon, Phoenix, Wyvern
- Colours: Green, Maroon (Academic/First team/Service honours)
- Nickname: Vale
- Publication: The Eyrie
- Tuition: US$1,760.00 (Forms 1–5, day); US$3,400.00 (Forms 1–5, boarding); US$1,800.00 (Sixth Form, day); US$3,600.00 (Sixth Form, boarding); (Note: Termly fees, the year has 3 terms)
- Feeder schools: Eaglesvale Preparatory School
- Affiliations: ATS; CHISZ
- Alumni: Old Valians
- Website: www.eaglesvale.ac.zw

Eaglesvale Senior School is a Christian, co-educational independent, boarding and day school situated on an estate approximately 40 hectares (100 acres) in Harare, Zimbabwe. It is 12 km south west of the Harare Central Business District. It shares the same estate with Eaglesvale Preparatory School which is the primary school.

There are over 500 pupils in the senior school. Students, alumni and staff of Eaglesvale call their school 'Vale'.

Eaglesvale Senior School and Preparatory School are members of the Association of Trust Schools (ATS) and the Headmasters are members of the Conference of Heads of Independent Schools in Zimbabwe (CHISZ). The schools participate in the festivals held by the National Institute of Allied Arts.

== History ==
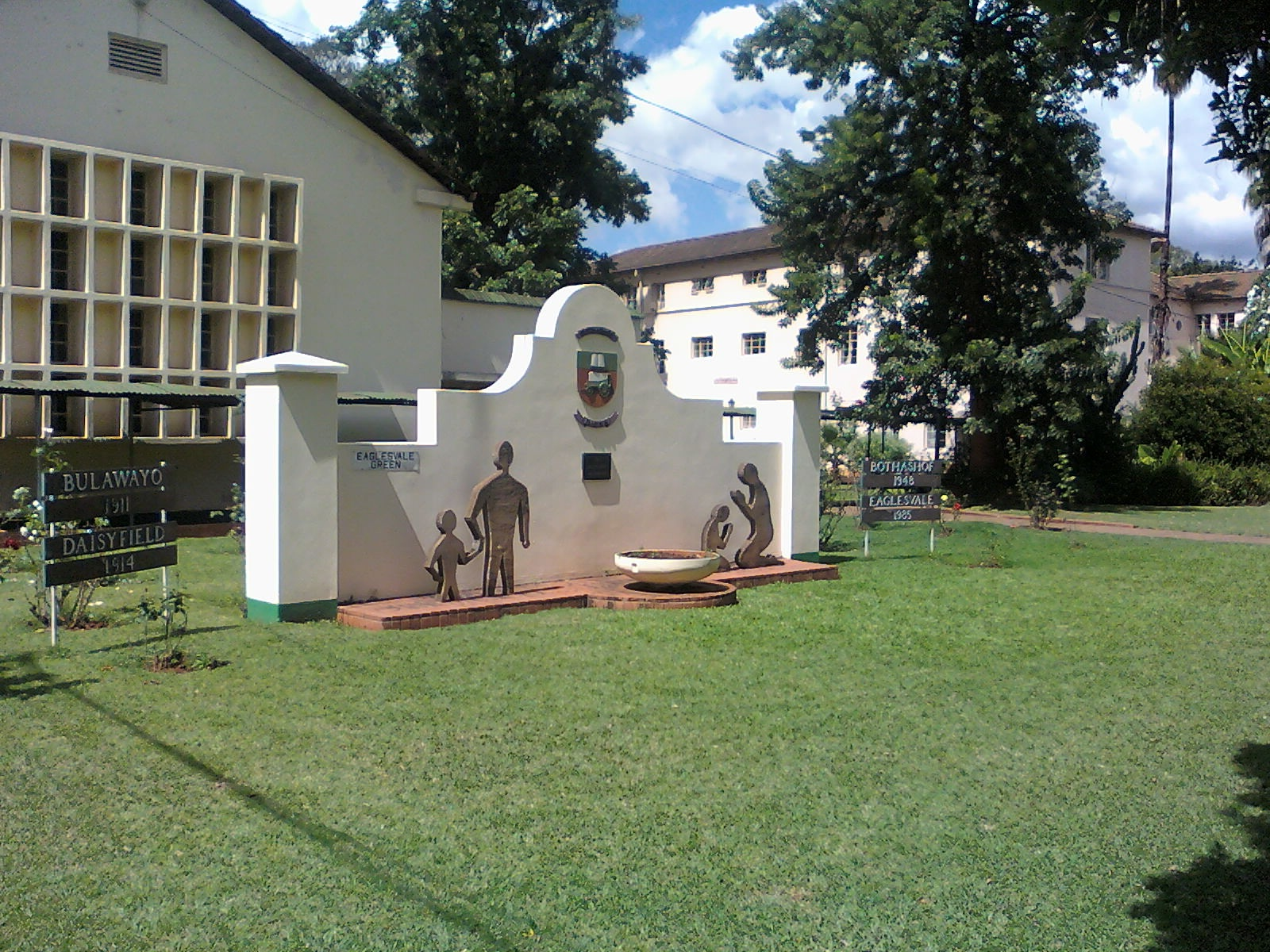
Eaglesvale Green

Eaglesvale’s first home was in Bulawayo where it opened as the Bulawayo Orphanage on 30 January 1911, an establishment of the Dutch Reformed Church by Reverends A.J. Botha and J.N. Geldenhuys. In 1914 the Dutch Reformed Church then moved the school (orphanage) to Daisyfield Farm in Somabhula near Gweru with the intention of establishing a farm to produce food for the orphans. The school was renamed Daisyfiled. In 1948, the Dutch Reformed Church as the responsible Authority moved the school to the present site. This was a farm 16 kilometres (10 mi) from Salisbury (now Harare). The school was built close to the railway line for easy transport. The school was renamed Bothashof School in honour of H Botha, son of Rev. A.J. Botha, also a Reverend of the Dutch Reformed Church. As the city expanded, most of the farm was sold giving in to industrial development in the early 1970s. In 1978 the school struggled to get students resulting in the Dutch Reformed Church, Central Africa, closing the school and selling the land to National Railways of Zimbabwe (then Rhodesia Railways).

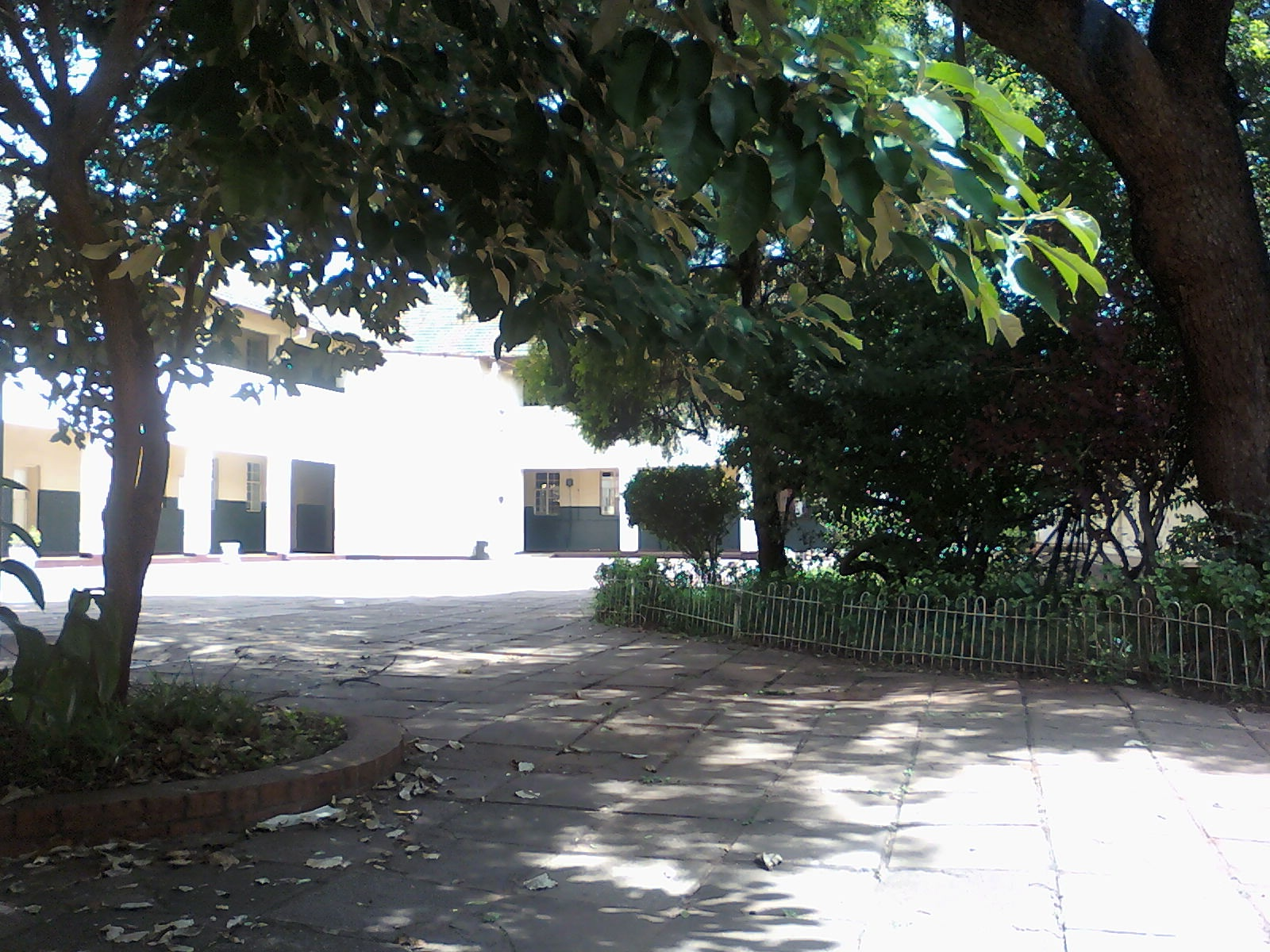
Eaglesvale View

In 1982, the school reopened with one black student and the rest white. Due to the new Zimbabwean Government’s policy of education for all, the school enrolment increased to 400 in the Junior School and eight hundred in the Senior School. The principal was Mr Stokes.

In 1985, Bothashof School was renamed Eaglesvale. In 1988, the school celebrated 40 years in Willowvale. J Bousfield joined the school in 1989 as the new headmaster. In 2002 Kenneth McKean took over as headmaster. Due to economic and other hardships, the school enrolment dropped to below 600. New subjects such as Design and Technology, Thinking Skills etc. were introduced to the curriculum and the enrolment stabilised. McKean left at the end of August 2008 and Mr Tirivavi took over as headmaster of the school.

On 11 June 2010, the Dutch Reformed Church, Central Africa, surrendered the Daisyfield Trust which inter alia had the responsibility of Eaglesvale School to the Reformed Church in Zimbabwe under the leadership of Rev Dr Chomutiri as moderator. The Daisyfield Trust was renamed the RCZ Daisyfield Trust. All legal formalities were completed. On 13 February 2014, the Dutch Reformed Church Central Africa represented by Rev G A Brytenbach publicly handed over Eaglesvale School to the Reformed Church in Zimbabwe represented by the Moderator Rev Dr Rangarirai Rutoro. The event was attended by Local Government minister Ignatius Chombo, Education minister Lazarus Dokora and Finance minister Patrick Chinamasa.

In 2015, Naison Tirivavi left the school with R. Ndawona, then deputy headmaster, assuming the role as acting headmaster of Eaglesvale Senior School. Dennis Anderson was appointed Headmaster of the Senior School from 1 May 2016.

== Preparatory school ==
Eaglesvale Preparatory School is a Christian, co-educational independent, boarding and day school situated on an estate approximately 100 acres in Harare, Zimbabwe. It is 12 km south west of the Harare Central Business District. The school is located on the same estate with Eaglesvale Senior School which is the high school.

== The school badge and motto ==
The school badge consists of a shield divided into two fields horizontally and the motto of the institution underneath. The shield has a bible on a green background in the top division and an ox wagon on a maroon background in the bottom division of the shield. The badge symbolised the history of the people that founded the school who tried to live according to the Word of God. Diens is the school motto which means "Service" in the Afrikaans language.

== Notable alumni ==
- Andy Blignaut, Zimbabwe cricketer
- Gary Brent, Zimbabwe cricketer
- Mark Burmester, Zimbabwe cricketer
- Alistair Campbell, Zimbabwe cricketer- former Zimbabwe cricket captain
- Friday Kasteni, Zimbabwe cricketer
- Rugare Magarira, Zimbabwe cricketer
- Darlington Matambanadzo, Zimbabwe cricketer
- Everton Matambanadzo, Zimbabwe cricketer
- Dougie Marillier, Zimbabwe cricketer, inventor of the Marillier shot (batting technique)
- Solomon Mire, Zimbabwe cricketer
- Tinashe Mutanga, Zimbabwe track athlete
- Tatenda Tsumba, Zimbabwe track athlete

== Photo gallery ==
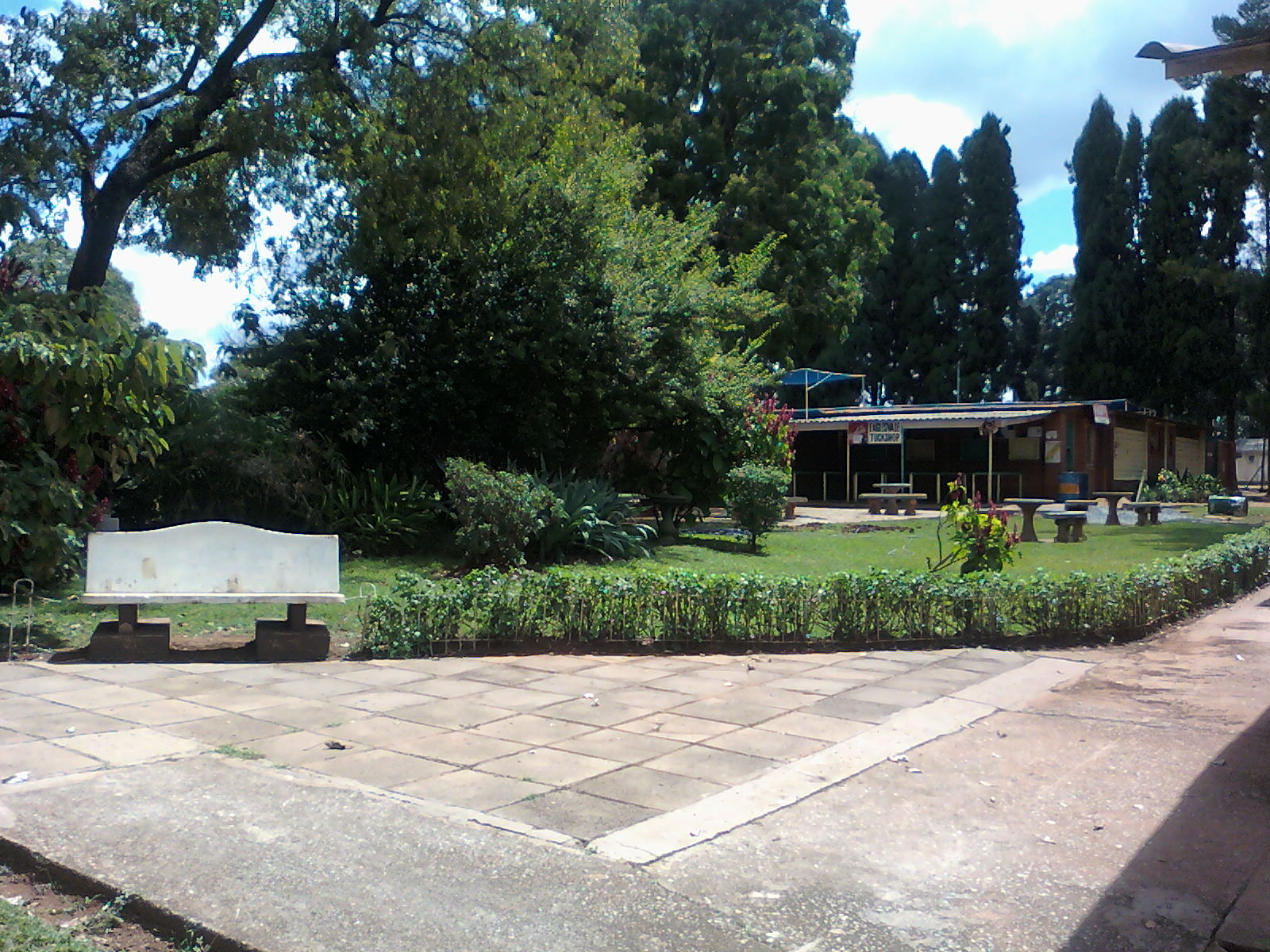
The landscape

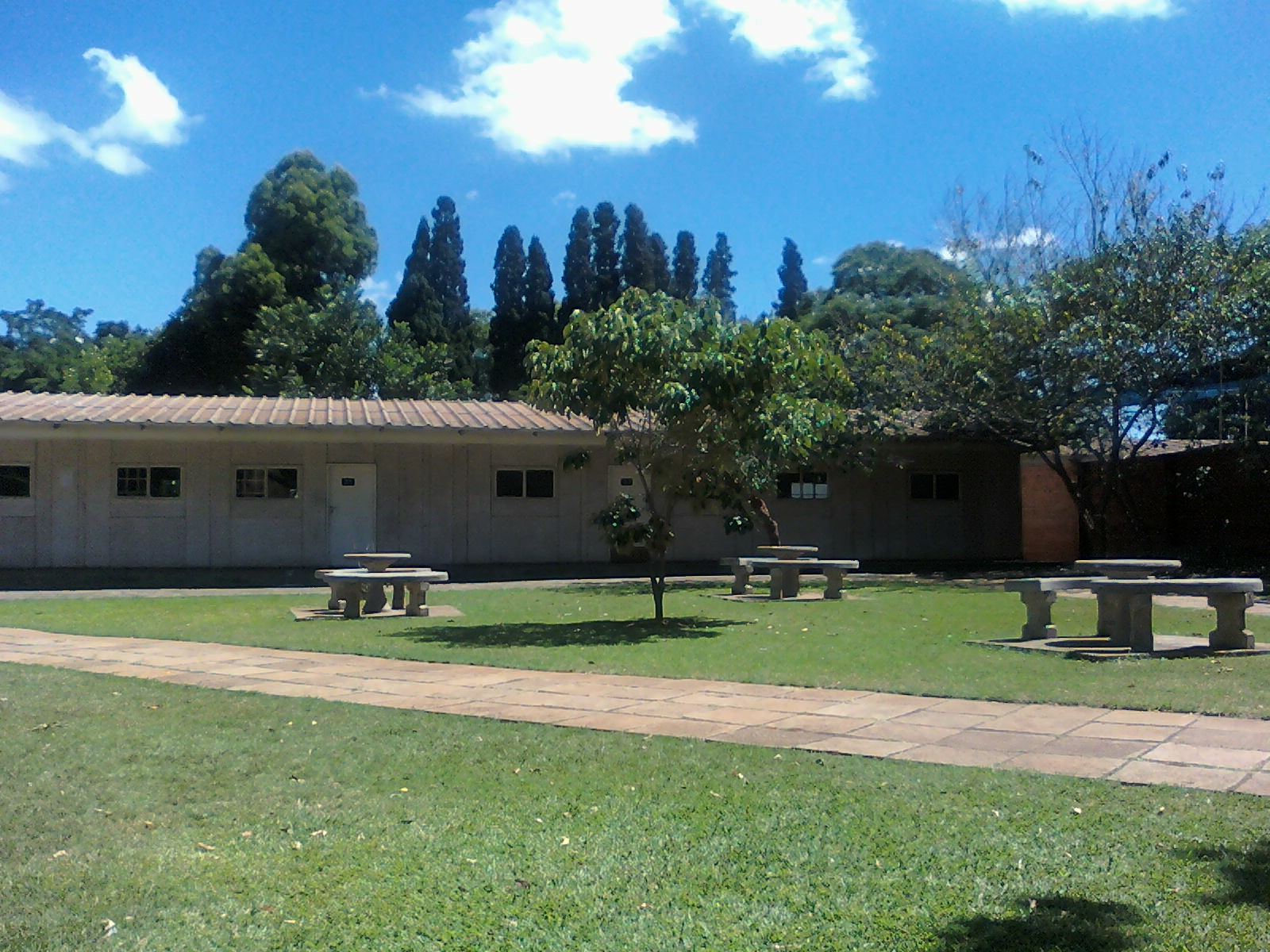
Classroom blocks

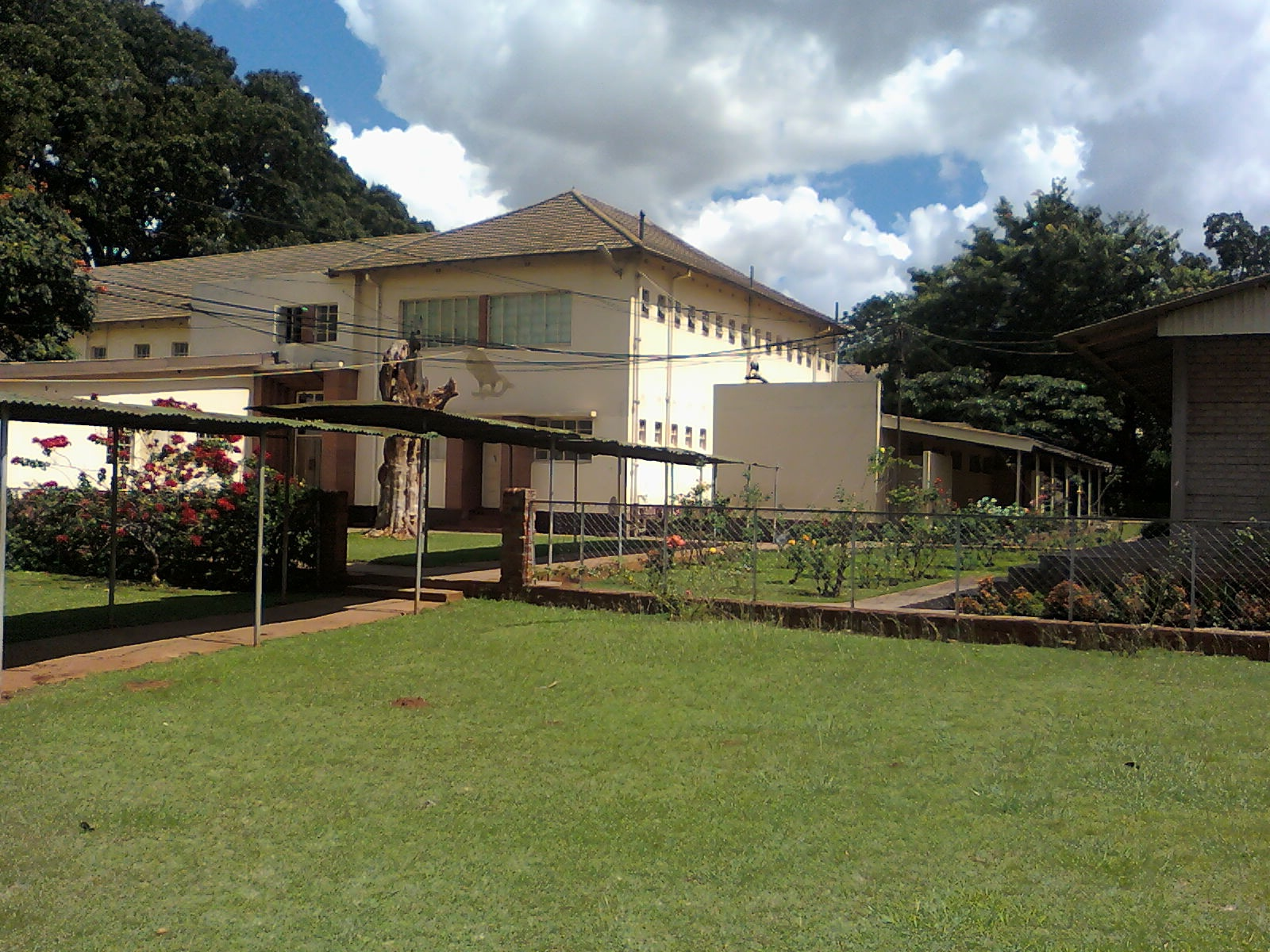
Boys Hostel Green

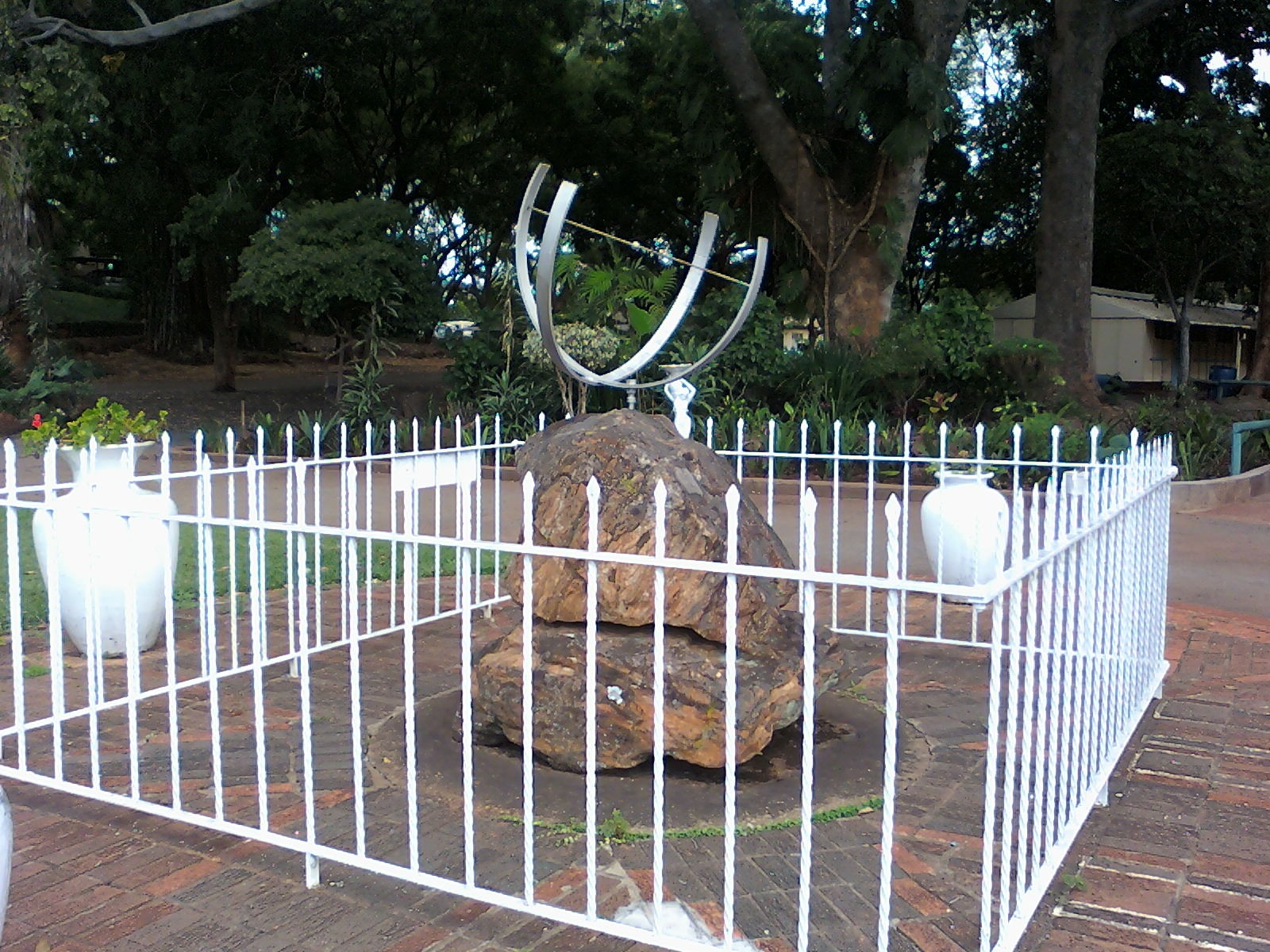
The Vale Armillary Sphere

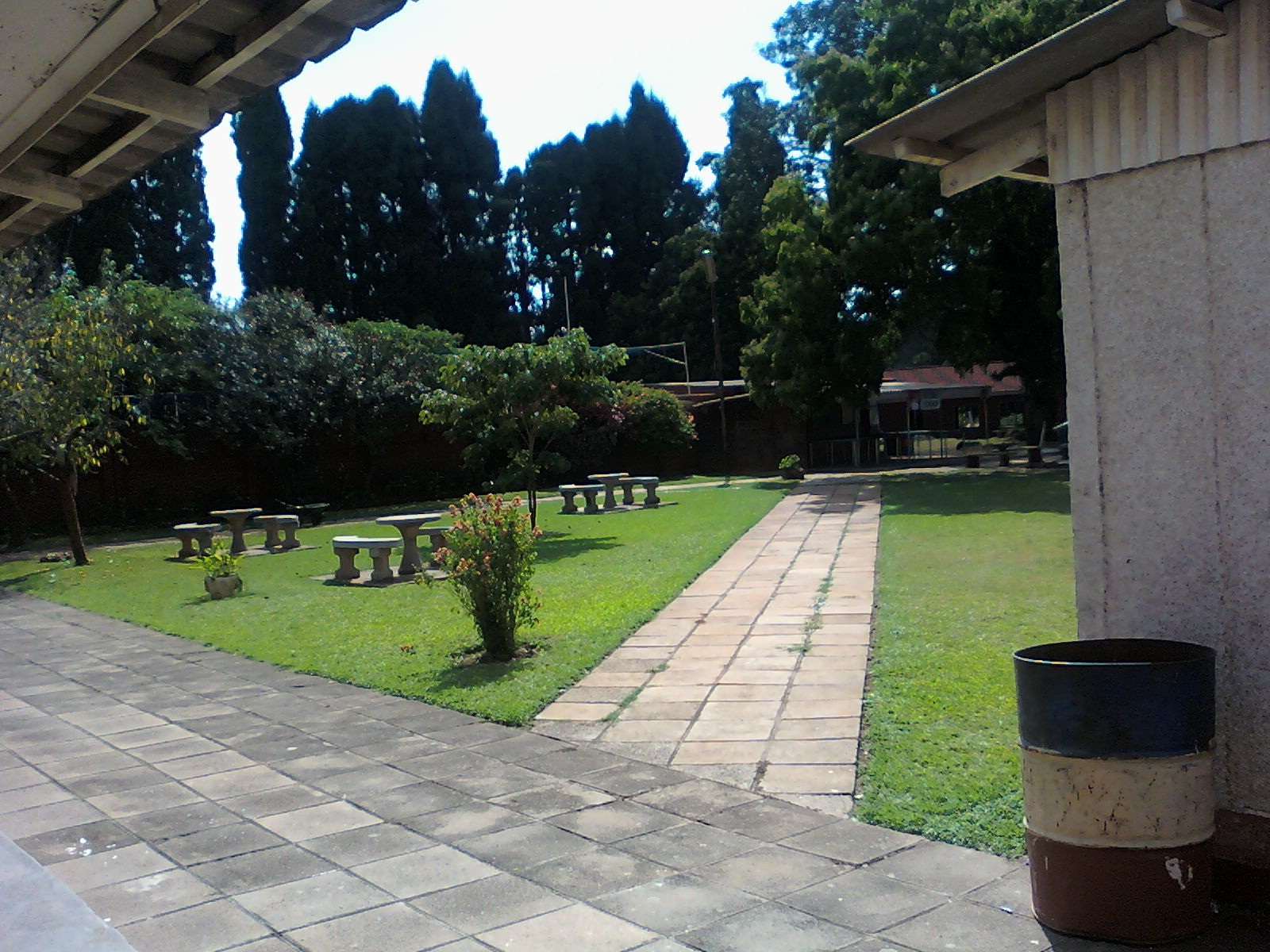
Scenery from the paths of Vale

== See also ==
- List of schools in Zimbabwe
- List of boarding schools
- List of boarding schools in Zimbabwe
