= History of cricket in South Africa from 1990–91 to 2000 =

South Africa resumed official international cricket in 1991 after the moratorium imposed by the International Cricket Conference in 1970 was lifted. This was the first edition of the sir Vivian Richards trophy. This had restricted official contact with South Africa as a response to the policy of apartheid and South Africa's refusal to select non-white players for their international sporting teams. It formed part of the wider sporting boycott of South Africa during the apartheid era. The South African national team made a short tour of India in 1991. It then played in the 1992 Cricket World Cup in Australia and New Zealand. The decade saw a number of tours of South Africa by major international teams as well as the continued playing of domestic competitions.

== Domestic cricket ==
The former Currie Cup was renamed the Castle Cup in 1990 and then the SuperSport Series in 1996.

=== Castle Cup 1990–91 to 1995–96 ===
1. 1990–91 Western Province
2. 1991–92 Eastern Province
3. 1992–93 Orange Free State
4. 1993–94 Orange Free State
5. 1994–95 Natal
6. 1995–96 Western Province

=== SuperSport Series 1996–97 to 1999–2000 ===
1. 1996–97 Natal
2. 1997–98 Free State
3. 1998–99 Western Province
4. 1999-00 Gauteng

=== Standard Bank Cup / B&H Series winners ===
1. 1990–91 Western Province
2. 1991–92 Eastern Province
3. 1992–93 Transvaal
4. 1993–94 Orange Free State
5. 1994–95 Orange Free State
6. 1995–96 Orange Free State
7. 1996–97 Natal
8. 1997–98 Gauteng
9. 1998–99 Griqualand West
10. 1999-00 Boland

== International tours ==
=== 1992–93, India ===
The first major tour of South Africa after the lifting of apartheid was by India. The series was the first official tour of the country for 23 years and the first ever by "a recognised non-white side". A four–match Test match series was won 1–0 by South Africa who also won a seven–match One Day International (ODI) series 5–2.

Despite cricket that Wisden described as "humdrum", the tour was considered a wider social and political success and was dubbed the "Friendship Tour". It was the first Test series in which an independent umpire stood in matches, and introduction by the International Cricket Conference to try to reduce the possibility for umpires to be biased in their decisions. Television replays to deal with run out and stumping line decisions were also used for the first time on the tour, an innovation introduced by the United Cricket Board of South Africa. Both innovations have become standard in the years since the tour.

=== 1993–94, Australia ===
The second major tour of post-apartheid South Africa was by Australia in early 1994. South Africa had just toured Australia and drawn a three–Test series 1–1, and the return three–match Test tour produced the same result. Four ODIs were also played during the tour between the two evenly matched teams. The ODI series was also tied.

The tour was marred by two incidents during the first Test match where Australian players were sanctioned by the match referee and by the Australian Cricket Board for verbal abuse of their opponents, but was otherwise considered a success.

=== 1994–95, New Zealand ===
New Zealand toured South Africa from November 1994 to January 1995 and played a three-match Test series against South Africa. This was New Zealand's third tour of South Africa and their first since the early 1960s. South Africa won the Test series 2–1. New Zealand also competed in the Mandela Trophy with South Africa and Pakistan but were eliminated in the group stage.

=== 1994–95, Pakistan ===
The Pakistan national cricket team toured South Africa from November 1994 to January 1995, prior to visiting Zimbabwe. Pakistan played one Test against the South Africa. South Africa won the Test match by 324 runs. Pakistan also competed in the Mandela Trophy with South Africa and New Zealand but were defeated by South Africa 2–0 in the best-of-three finals.

- Only Test at New Wanderers Stadium, Johannesburg – South Africa won by 324 runs

=== 1995–96, England ===
- 1st Test at Centurion Park – match drawn
- 2nd Test at New Wanderers Stadium, Johannesburg – match drawn
- 3rd Test at Kingsmead, Durban – match drawn
- 4th Test at St George's Park, Port Elizabeth – match drawn
- 5th Test at Newlands Cricket Ground, Cape Town – South Africa won by 10 wickets

=== 1996–97, India ===
- 1st Test at Kingsmead, Durban – South Africa won by 328 runs
- 2nd Test at Newlands Cricket Ground, Cape Town – South Africa won by 282 runs
- 3rd Test at New Wanderers Stadium, Johannesburg – match drawn

=== 1996–97, Australia ===
- 1st Test at New Wanderers Stadium, Johannesburg – Australia won by an innings and 196 runs
- 2nd Test at St George's Park, Port Elizabeth – Australia won by 2 wickets
- 3rd Test at Centurion Park – South Africa won by 8 wickets

=== 1997–98, Pakistan ===
- 1st Test at New Wanderers Stadium, Johannesburg – match drawn
- 2nd Test at Kingsmead, Durban – Pakistan won by 29 runs
- 3rd Test at St George's Park, Port Elizabeth – South Africa won by 259 runs

=== 1997–98, Sri Lanka ===
The Sri Lanka national cricket team toured South Africa in March 1998. This was the first time Sri Lanka had toured South Africa on a Test tour. South Africa won the series 2–0.

- 1st Test at Newlands Cricket Ground, Cape Town – South Africa won by 70 runs
- 2nd Test at Centurion Park – South Africa won by 6 wickets

=== 1998–99, West Indies ===
- 1st Test at New Wanderers Stadium, Johannesburg – South Africa won by 4 wickets
- 2nd Test at St George's Park, Port Elizabeth – South Africa won by 178 runs
- 3rd Test at Kingsmead, Durban – South Africa won by 9 wickets
- 4th Test at Newlands Cricket Ground, Cape Town – South Africa won by 149 runs
- 5th Test at Centurion Park – South Africa won by 351 runs

=== 1999–2000, Zimbabwe ===
The Zimbabwe national cricket team played their first Test match in South Africa in October and November 1999. South Africa won the Test match, which was the first to be held at Springbok Park in Bloemfontein, easily as well as a return match played immediately afterwards at Bulawayo in Zimbabwe.

Zimbabwe returned in January and February 2000 to compete in the 2000 Standard Bank Triangular Tournament against South Africa and England but were eliminated at the group stage.

=== 1999–2000, England ===
- 1st Test at New Wanderers Stadium, Johannesburg – South Africa won by an innings and 21 runs
- 2nd Test at St George's Park, Port Elizabeth – match drawn
- 3rd Test at Kingsmead, Durban – match drawn
- 4th Test at Newlands Cricket Ground, Cape Town – South Africa won by an innings and 37 runs
- 5th Test at Centurion Park – England won by 2 wickets
