= Eaglesvale =

Eaglesvale may refer to the following institutions in Harare, Zimbabwe:

- Eaglesvale High School
- Eaglesvale Preparatory School
