= Nightwatchman (cricket) =

Cricket role

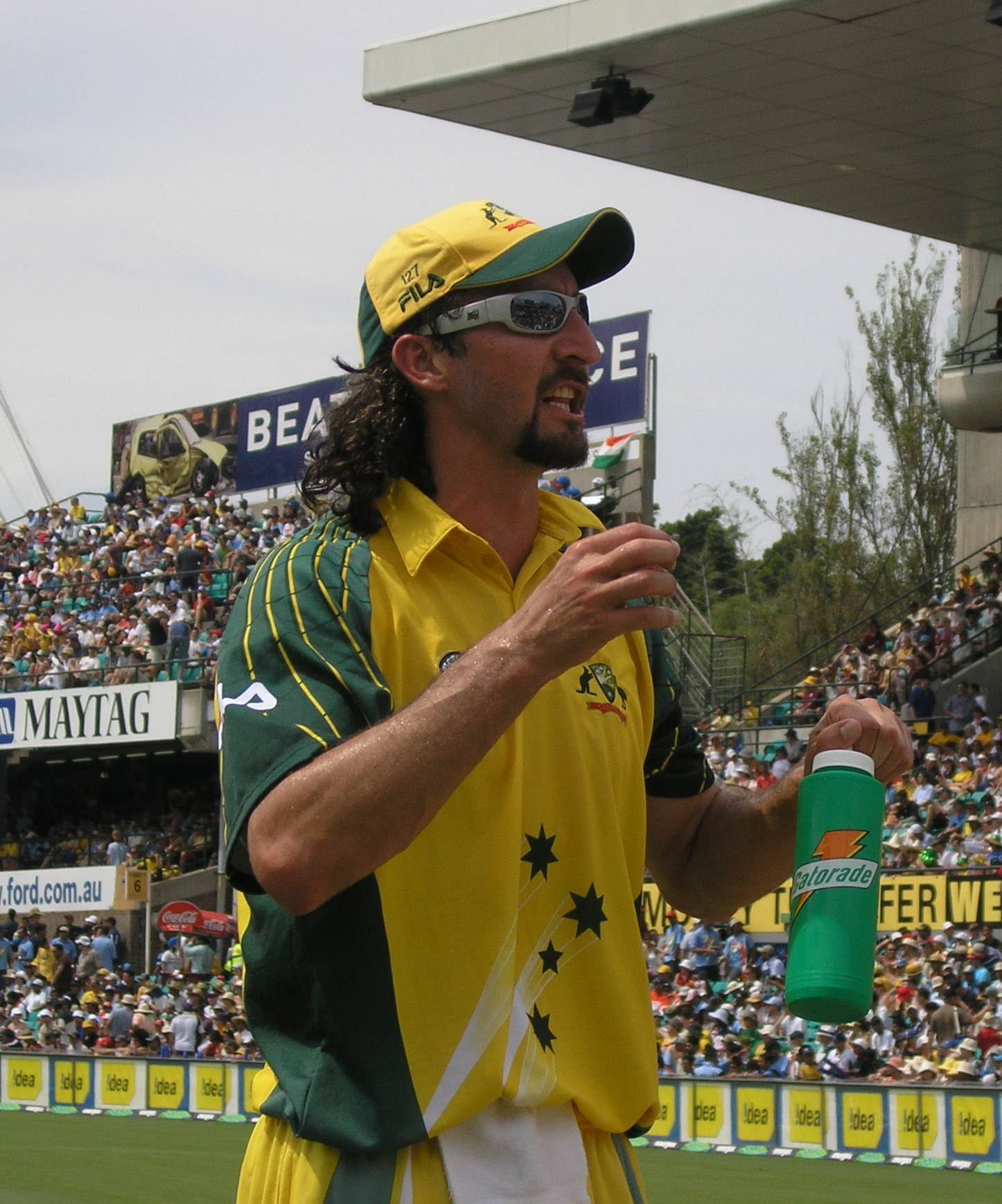
Jason Gillespie holds the record for the highest Test score from a nightwatchman, scoring 201* against Bangladesh at the Chittagong Divisional Stadium during the second test of Australia's 2005–06 tour of Bangladesh

In the sport of cricket, a nightwatchman is a lower-order batter who comes in to bat higher up the order than usual near the end of the day's play. The nightwatchman's job is to maintain most of the strike until the close of play.

The name comes due to the goal of remaining in overnight after the end of the day, a play on words on the watchmen of public safety and law enforcement. In doing so they protect more capable batters from being out cheaply in what may be a period of tiredness or poor light at the end of the day and again the following morning when the early-morning conditions may favour the bowlers who will be refreshed from their night rest. The theory is that losing two top-order batters in quick succession would be worse than losing one top-order batter and a tailender.

== Tactical consideration ==
The role of nightwatchman is generally given to players who emphasise defensive technique over quick run-scoring, most often a bowler who would normally bat in the 8th or 9th position. There have been occasions when nightwatchmen have made a big score and six have made centuries in test matches. The nightwatchman's goal tactically is to play conservatively on the night to get through the evening and then play a more even style to score runs and turn over the strike to their batting partner. Daniel Vettori would place himself in the role on several occasions while he was the New Zealand captain. Wicket-keepers may also take on the role, Alan Knott, Wasim Bari, Ben Barnett and Ian Healy have scored half-centuries in the role.

Even if the nightwatchman does survive until the end of the day, the beginning of the next day's play will see refreshed bowlers with better light facing a less capable batter. As a result, not all captains use the tactic. Steve Waugh abandoned the tactic during his captaincy of Australia. Furthermore, under Ben Stokes England have instead favoured the lower order batsman to play aggressively (the nighthawk). The defensive technique inherent to the role may also lead to their play being too slow for the conditions, the nightwatchman being too good to get out, but not good enough to score at the desired rate of their team.

The nightwatchman is not to be confused with the pinch hitter, a middle to lower order batter who is promoted up the order in limited-overs games, or in first-class games where their team is looking for a quick declaration, in the pursuit of quick runs without too much concern for their wicket.

It is very rare but not unknown for a team to use nightwatchmen to open an innings if it begins late in the day. Captains will more typically trust in the ability of the specialist opening batsman to do their usual job of handling the new ball regardless of how difficult that might be. Australian Captain and opening batter Mark Taylor has remarked that most batters will accept a nightwatchman when asked, but as an opener he was never offered one.

== Reversing the order ==
In the days before covered wickets it was common for teams to protect the upper part of the order from a sticky wicket by reversing the batting order and hoping to exchange the inevitable loss of wickets for the time it would take for the wicket to start playing better. Although not necessarily done late in the day, the reversed order effectively turned the promoted part of the order into nightwatchmen for the upper half. Don Bradman holds the Test match record for highest score as the #7 due to a reversal of the order, scoring 270 not out against England in 1937. The #7 position is usually given to the best batter from the Wicketkeeper and the bowlers. Bill O'Reilly and Chuck Fleetwood-Smith opened the batting and were dismissed for 0 runs each. It was the only time either opened the batting in their Test career.

== Test centuries by nightwatchmen ==
There have been six test centuries by nightwatchmen (as of 2019), as recognised by ESPNcricinfo:

Player	Team	Score	Versus	Ground	Year
Nasim-ul-Ghani	Pakistan	101	England	Lord's, London, England	1962 Second Test
Tony Mann	Australia	105	India	WACA Ground, Perth, Western Australia	1977 Second Test
Syed Kirmani	India	101*	Australia	Wankhede Stadium, Mumbai, India	1979 Sixth Test
Mark Boucher	South Africa	125	Zimbabwe	Harare Sports Club, Harare, Zimbabwe	1999 One-off Test
Mark Boucher	South Africa	108	England	Sahara Stadium Kingsmead, Durban, South Africa	1999 Third Test
Jason Gillespie	Australia	201*	Bangladesh	Chittagong Divisional Stadium, Chittagong, Bangladesh	2006 Second Test

There has been debate about whether Nasim-ul-Ghani (who later opened in a Test) and wicketkeeper Boucher were genuine nightwatchmen – however, in the matches in question they both came in at No. 6, at the end of the day, ahead of more recognised batsmen, and Cricinfo considers them to have been nightwatchmen.

Alex Tudor (of England) was close to making a century as a nightwatchman; he made 99 not out against New Zealand in 1999 at Edgbaston, and was stranded one run short of his maiden test century when Graham Thorpe got the total to the point where a boundary was needed for the win with Tudor being on 95 runs, needing a six to reach his century. Tudor then hit the winning runs with a four, leaving him on 99*, the highest test score he would make in his injury curtailed career.

Also close was Harold Larwood. In the final Test of the 1932–33 Ashes, Larwood made 98 as a nightwatchman, the highest innings made in the role up to that time as well as the highest Test score Larwood would make in his career.
