= Mark Burmester =

Zimbabwean cricketer (born 1968)

Personal information
- Full name: Mark Greville Burmester
- Born: 24 January 1968 (age 58); Durban, South Africa
- Batting: Right-handed
- Bowling: Right-arm medium

International information
- National side: Zimbabwe (1992–1995)
- Test debut (cap 3): 18 October 1992 v India
- Last Test: 7 November 1992 v New Zealand
- ODI debut (cap 23): 3 March 1992 v New Zealand
- Last ODI: 26 February 1995 v Pakistan

Career statistics
| Competition | Test | ODI |
|---|---|---|
| Matches | 3 | 8 |
| Runs scored | 54 | 109 |
| Batting average | 27.00 | 18.16 |
| 100s/50s | 0/0 | 0/0 |
| Top score | 30* | 39 |
| Balls bowled | 436 | 209 |
| Wickets | 3 | 5 |
| Bowling average | 75.66 | 42.60 |
| 5 wickets in innings | 0 | 0 |
| 10 wickets in match | 0 | 0 |
| Best bowling | 3/78 | 3/36 |
| Catches/stumpings | 1/– | 2/– |
- Source: Cricinfo, 9 February 2017

Mark Greville Burmester (born 24 January 1968) is a former Zimbabwean cricketer who played in three Test matches and eight One Day Internationals between 1992 and 1995. He played in Zimbabwe's inaugural Test, opening the bowling he became the first Zimbabwean to take a Test wicket. He was born at Durban in South Africa and is a past student of Eaglesvale High School in Harare.

In February 2020, he was named in Zimbabwe's squad for the Over-50s Cricket World Cup in South Africa. However, the tournament was cancelled during the third round of matches due to the coronavirus pandemic.

His son, Dean Burmester, is a professional golfer.
