= Zimbabwean cricket team in Pakistan in 1998–99 =

The Zimbabwe national cricket team toured Pakistan from November to December 1998 and played a three-match Test series against the Pakistan national cricket team. Zimbabwe won the opening Test by 7 wickets, their first overseas victory, and went on to win the series 1–0. Zimbabwe were captained by Alistair Campbell and Pakistan by Aamer Sohail. In addition, the teams played a three-match Limited Overs International (LOI) series which Pakistan won 2–1.

== ODI series ==
=== 1st ODI ===
20 November 1998
Scorecard

Zimbabwe; 237 (49.3 overs)	v	Pakistan; 241/6 (47.4 overs)
NC Johnson 74 (98); Saqlain Mushtaq 4/35 (9.3 overs)		Aamer Sohail 91 (105); GW Flower 2/17 (3 overs)

Pakistan won by 6 wickets
Jinnah Stadium, Gujranwala
Umpires: Mian Mohammad Aslam and Mohammad Nazir
Player of the match: Aamer Sohail (PAK)

- Pakistan won the toss and elected to field.

=== 2nd ODI ===
22 November 1998
Scorecard

Pakistan; 211 (50 overs)	v	Zimbabwe; 212/4 (40.4 overs)
Hasan Raza 46 (70); HH Streak 3/40 (10 overs)		NC Johnson 103 (120); Saqlain Mushtaq 2/43 (10 overs)

Zimbabwe won by 6 wickets
Sheikhupura Stadium, Sheikhupura
Umpires: Athar Zaidi and Saleem Badar
Player of the match: NC Johnson (ZIM)

- Zimbabwe won the toss and elected to field.

=== 3rd ODI ===
24 November 1998
Scorecard

Pakistan; 302/6 (50 overs)	v	Zimbabwe; 191 (37.2 overs)
Ijaz Ahmed 132 (103); HH Streak 2/62 (10 overs)		A Flower 61 (94); Saqlain Mushtaq 3/27 (7 overs)

Pakistan won by 111 runs
Rawalpindi Cricket Stadium, Rawalpindi
Umpires: Javed Akhtar and Riazuddin
Player of the match: Ijaz Ahmed (PAK)

- Zimbabwe won the toss and elected to field.

== Test series summary ==
=== 1st Test ===
27–30 November 1998
(5-day match)
Scorecard

Pakistan	v	Zimbabwe
296 (85.5 overs); Ijaz Ahmed 87 (128); HH Streak 4/93 (22.5 overs)		238 (68.3 overs); NC Johnson 107 (117); Wasim Akram 5/52 (23 overs)
103 (100.5 overs); Saeed Anwar 31 (76); Wasim Akram 31 (55); HK Olonga 4/42 (11 overs)		162/3 (48.2 overs); MW Goodwin 73* (124); Wasim Akram 3/47 (17 overs)

Zimbabwe won by 7 wickets
Arbab Niaz Stadium, Peshawar
Umpires: Athar Zaidi (PAK) and G Sharp (ENG)
Player of the match: NC Johnson (ZIM)

- Zimbabwe won the toss and elected to field.
- The match was scheduled for five days but completed in four.

=== 2nd Test ===
10–14 December 1998
(5-day match)
Scorecard

Zimbabwe	v	Pakistan
183 (66.5 overs); A Flower 60* (147); Saqlain Mushtaq 5/32 (13.5 overs)		325/9d (113 overs); Mohammad Yousuf 120* (206); HK Olonga 3/63 (25 overs)
48/0 (12 overs); GW Flower 17* (32)

Match drawn
Gaddafi Stadium, Lahore
Umpires: DB Hair (AUS) and Mian Mohammad Aslam (PAK)
Player of the match: Yousuf Youhana (PAK)

- Pakistan won the toss and elected to field.
- There was no play on the final day.
- Naved Ashraf (PAK) made his Test debut.

=== 3rd Test ===
17–21 December 1998
(5-day match)
Scorecard

Pakistan	v	Zimbabwe

Match abandoned
Iqbal Stadium, Faisalabad
Umpires: DB Cowie (NZ) and Saleem Badar (PAK)

- No toss made
