= English cricket team in Zimbabwe in 1999–2000 =

	Zimbabwe	England
- Dates: 16 February 2000 – 23 February 2000
Captains	Andy Flower	Nasser Hussain

One Day International series
- Results: England won the 3-match series 3–0
Most runs	Stuart Carlisle (102)	Graeme Hick (180)
Most wickets	Gary Brent (4); Grant Flower (4); Heath Streak (4); Dirk Viljoen (4)	Craig White (9)

The English cricket team toured Zimbabwe for a four-match One Day International (ODI) series between 16 February and 23 February 2000. England won the ODI series 3–0 after the fourth match was abandoned without a ball bowled.

== ODI series ==
=== 1st ODI ===
16 February 2000
Scorecard

Zimbabwe; 194/7 (48 overs)	v	England; 199/5 (46.3 overs)
Grant Flower 55* (63); Craig White 3/29 (9 overs)		Graeme Hick 87* (108); Grant Flower 3/27 (10 overs)

England won by 5 wickets (D/L method)
Queens Sports Club, Bulawayo
Umpires: Graeme Evans (Zim) and Ian Robinson (Zim)
Player of the match: Graeme Hick (Eng)

- Zimbabwe won the toss and elected to bat.
- Both innings were reduced to 48 overs.
  England were chasing a target of 199.

=== 2nd ODI ===
18 February 2000
Scorecard

Zimbabwe; 131 (47.3 overs)	v	England; 134/9 (44.2 overs)
Stuart Carlisle 31 (56); Craig White 5/21 (10 overs)		Mark Ealham 32 (54); Heath Streak 3/26 (10 overs)

England won by 1 wicket
Queens Sports Club, Bulawayo
Umpires: Jeff Fenwick (Zim) and Russell Tiffin (Zim)
Player of the match: Craig White (Eng)

- England won the toss and elected to field.

=== 3rd ODI ===
20 February 2000
Scorecard

England; 248/7 (50 overs)	v	Zimbabwe; 163 (46.5 overs)
Graeme Hick 80 (95); Dirk Viljoen 3/20 (6 overs)		Stuart Carlisle 41 (81); Graeme Hick 5/33 (10 overs)

England won by 85 runs
Harare Sports Club, Harare
Umpires: Graeme Evans (Zim) and Ian Robinson (Zim)
Player of the match: Graeme Hick (Eng)

- Zimbabwe won the toss and elected to field.

=== 4th ODI ===
23 February 2000
Scorecard

Zimbabwe	v	England

Match abandoned without a ball bowled
Harare Sports Club, Harare
Umpires: Kevan Barbour (Zim) and Russell Tiffin (Zim)
