= English cricket team in South Africa in 1999–2000 =

	England	South Africa
- Dates: 1 November 1999 – 13 February 2000
Captains	Nasser Hussain	Hansie Cronje

Test series
- Result: South Africa won the 5-match series 2–1
Most runs	Nasser Hussain (370)	Gary Kirsten (396)
Most wickets	Andy Caddick (16)	Allan Donald (22)
- Player of the series: Daryll Cullinan (SA)

The England cricket team toured South Africa during the 1999–2000 season, playing five Test matches and a triangular One Day International (ODI) series against South Africa and Zimbabwe. The tour became infamous, after Hansie Cronje later admitted he had been bribed to ensure a result in the fifth Test of the series.

== Test series ==
=== 1st Test ===
25–28 November 1999
Scorecard

England	v	South Africa
122 (41.4 overs); Andrew Flintoff 38 (48); Allan Donald 6/53 (15 overs)		403/9d (138 overs); Daryll Cullinan 108 (170); Darren Gough 5/70 (30 overs)
260 (83.4 overs); Alec Stewart 86 (130); Allan Donald 5/74 (23 overs)

South Africa won by an innings and 21 runs
New Wanderers Stadium, Johannesburg
Umpires: Dave Orchard (SA) and Srinivasaraghavan Venkataraghavan (Ind)
Player of the match: Allan Donald (SA)

- South Africa won the toss and elected to field.
- Chris Adams, Gavin Hamilton and Michael Vaughan (all Eng) made their Test debuts.

=== 2nd Test ===
9–13 December 1999
Scorecard

South Africa	v	England
450 (128.1 overs); Lance Klusener 174 (221); Phil Tufnell 4/124 (42 overs)		373 (137.1 overs); Mike Atherton 108 (274); Nantie Hayward 4/75 (28.1 overs)
224/4d (92.5 overs); Jacques Kallis 85* (260); Andy Caddick 2/29 (18 overs)		153/6 (77 overs); Nasser Hussain 70* (211); Shaun Pollock 2/18 (17 overs)

Match drawn
St George's Oval, Port Elizabeth
Umpires: Steve Bucknor (WI) and Rudi Koertzen (SA)
Player of the match: Lance Klusener (SA)

- England won the toss and elected to field.
- Nantie Hayward (SA) made his Test debut.

=== 3rd Test ===
26–30 December 1999
Scorecard

England	v	South Africa
366/9d (166.4 overs); Nasser Hussain 146* (463); Hansie Cronje 2/5 (7 overs)		156 (50.5 overs); Shaun Pollock 64 (89); Andy Caddick 7/46 (16 overs)
		572/7 (f/o) (209.2 overs); Gary Kirsten 275 (642); Mark Butcher 2/32 (8.2 overs)

Match drawn
Kingsmead, Durban
Umpires: Doug Cowie (NZ) and Dave Orchard (SA)
Player of the match: Andy Caddick (Eng) and Gary Kirsten (SA)

- England won the toss and elected to bat.

=== 4th Test ===
2–5 January 2000
Scorecard

England	v	South Africa
258 (113 overs); Mike Atherton 71 (124); Allan Donald 5/47 (26 overs)		421 (153.4 overs); Daryll Cullinan 120 (255); Chris Silverwood 5/91 (32 overs)
126 (60.3 overs); Mike Atherton 35 (109); Paul Adams 3/42 (19.3 overs)

South Africa won by an innings and 37 runs
Newlands Cricket Ground, Cape Town
Umpires: B. C. Cooray (SL) and Cyril Mitchley (SA)
Player of the match: Daryll Cullinan (SA)

- England won the toss and elected to bat.

=== 5th Test ===
14–18 January 2000
Scorecard

South Africa	v	England
248/8d (72 overs); Lance Klusener 61* (96); Alan Mullally 2/42 (24 overs)		0/0d (0 overs)
Forfeit		251/8 (75.1 overs); Alec Stewart 73 (140); Shaun Pollock 3/53 (20 overs)

England won by 2 wickets
SuperSport Park, Centurion
Umpires: Darrell Hair (Aus) and Rudi Koertzen (SA)
Player of the match: Michael Vaughan (Eng)
Man of the Series: Daryll Cullinan (SA)

- England won the toss and elected to field.
- No play was possible on Days 2, 3 or 4 due to heavy rain. Cronje and Hussein agreed to forfeit an innings each to provide a good game in the time remaining. Later Cronje admitted having been bribed 50,000 rand to ensure a result.
- The laws at the time did not allow for the forfeiture of the 1st innings, so England's 1st innings is recorded as 0/0 declared.

== Standard Bank Triangular Tournament ==
=== 2nd Match: South Africa v England ===
23 January 2000
Scorecard

South Africa; 184 (49.5 overs)	v	England; 185/1 (39.3 overs)
Jacques Kallis 57 (105); Darren Gough 4/29 (10 overs)		Nasser Hussain 85 (114); Nicky Boje 1/47 (10 overs)

England won by 9 wickets
Goodyear Park, Bloemfontein
Umpires: Danzel Becker (SA) and Dave Orchard (SA)
Player of the match: Darren Gough (Eng)

- South Africa won the toss and elected to bat.
- Chris Read, Vikram Solanki, Graeme Swann (all Eng) and David Terbrugge (SA) made their ODI debuts.

=== 3rd Match: South Africa v England ===
26 January 2000 (D/N)
Scorecard

South Africa; 204/7 (50 overs)	v	England; 203/9 (50 overs)
Jacques Kallis 43 (70); Darren Gough 3/36 (10 overs)		Chris Adams 42 (69); Lance Klusener 2/34 (10 overs)

South Africa won by 1 run
Newlands Cricket Ground, Cape Town
Umpires: Wilf Diedricks (SA) and Rudi Koertzen (SA)
Player of the match: Jacques Kallis (SA)

- South Africa won the toss and elected to bat.

=== 4th Match: England v Zimbabwe ===
28 January 2000 (D/N)
Scorecard

Zimbabwe; 211/7 (50 overs)	v	England; 107 (34.2 overs)
Neil Johnson 97 (131); Graeme Hick 1/25 (4 overs)		Chris Read 23 (40); Henry Olonga 6/19 (8.2 overs)

Zimbabwe won by 104 runs
Newlands Cricket Ground, Cape Town
Umpires: Ian Howell (SA) and Cyril Mitchley (SA)
Player of the match: Henry Olonga (Zim)

- Zimbabwe won the toss and elected to bat.

=== 5th Match: England v Zimbabwe ===
30 January 2000
Scorecard

Zimbabwe; 161/9 (50 overs)	v	England; 162/2 (32.1 overs)
Heath Streak 35* (65); Mark Ealham 5/15 (10 overs)		Nick Knight 72* (94); Heath Streak 1/26 (7.1 overs)

England won by 8 wickets
De Beers Diamond Oval, Kimberley
Umpires: Barry Lambson (SA) and Dave Orchard (SA)
Player of the match: Mark Ealham (Eng)

- Zimbabwe won the toss and elected to bat.

=== 7th Match: South Africa v England ===
4 February 2000 (D/N)
Scorecard

England; 231/6 (50 overs)	v	South Africa; 233/8 (49.4 overs)
Nick Knight 64 (111); Shaun Pollock 2/36 (10 overs)		Jonty Rhodes 42 (51); Mark Alleyne 3/55 (10 overs)

South Africa won by 2 wickets
Buffalo Park, East London
Umpires: Ian Howell (SA) and Rudi Koertzen (SA)
Player of the match: Mark Alleyne (Eng)

- South Africa won the toss and elected to field.

=== 9th Match: England v Zimbabwe ===
9 February 2000 (D/N)
Scorecard

England	v	Zimbabwe

Match abandoned without a ball bowled
SuperSport Park, Centurion
Umpires: Danzel Becker (SA) and Cyril Mitchley (SA)

- No toss.

=== Final: South Africa v England ===
13 February 2000 (D/N)
Scorecard

South Africa; 149 (45 overs)	v	England; 111 (38 overs)
Hansie Cronje 56 (113); Andy Caddick 4/19 (9 overs)		Craig White 16 (44); Shaun Pollock 5/20 (9 overs)

South Africa won by 38 runs
New Wanderers Stadium, Johannesburg
Umpires: Rudi Koertzen (SA) and Dave Orchard (SA)
Player of the match: Shaun Pollock (SA)

- England won the toss and elected to field.
