= Darlington Matambanadzo =

Zimbabwean cricket player

Personal information
- Full name: Darlington Rutendo Matambanadzo
- Born: 13 April 1976 (age 50); Harare, Zimbabwe
- Batting: Right-handed
- Bowling: Right-arm medium-fast
- Role: Bowler
- Relatives: Everton Matambanadzo (brother)

Domestic team information
- Years: Team
- 1993/94-1994/95: Mashonaland Under-24s
- 1995/96: Young Mashonaland
- 1996/97-2002/03: Mashonaland
- 2003/04: Manicaland

Career statistics
Competition	First-class	List A
Matches	25	4
Runs scored	643	103
Batting average	18.91	25.75
100s/50s	0/3	0/1
Top score	80	62
Balls bowled	1781	30
Wickets	34	0
Bowling average	34.29	–
5 wickets in innings	0	–
10 wickets in match	0	–
Best bowling	4/52	–
Catches/stumpings	10/–	3/–
- Source: CricketArchive, 26 January 2009

Darlington Rutendo Matambanadzo (born 13 April 1976) is a former Zimbabwean first-class cricketer who is the twin brother of Test cricketer Everton Matambanadzo.

Born in Harare, Zimbabwe, Matambanadzo started playing for Harare Club side Old Hararians. He attended Eaglesvale School. Matambanadzo debuted for Zimbabwe U/19s in July 1993 and made a development tour to South Africa before making his first-class debut aged 17 years, 276 days on 14 January 1994 at Queens Sports Club for Mashonaland Under 24s against Matabeleland, taking one wicket for 24 and none for 10 and remaining unbeaten on zero.

Matambanadzo took his best bowling figures of four wickets for 52 runs against Mashonaland Country Districts in September 1994 which led to selection against the touring Sri Lankan cricket side.

Matambanadzo's cricketing development was postponed as he entered the University of Zimbabwe, initially to study Accountancy before switching to Economics. Matambanadzo then found it difficult to regain his cricketing form and after struggling in domestic cricket, considered retiring from cricket to concentrate on his job as a financial consultant.

Matambanadzo began to develop his batting more and made his highest first-class score of 80 for Mashonaland against Manicaland but was still unable to break into the Zimbabwean side. He caused controversy in 2004 when he failed to play in a number of matches for Mashonaland for a month without an excuse. Matambanadzo played his final match in Zimbabwe, a List A match for Manicaland against Midlands at Alexandra Sports Club, Harare on 5 February 2006, scoring one and taking no wicket for seven from one over before moving to Blantyre, Malawi to teach cricket and hockey in Saint Andrew's International High School between 2007 and 2008.
