= South African cricket team in Zimbabwe in 1991–92 =

South African national cricket team that visited Zimbabwe

The South African national cricket team visited Zimbabwe in February 1992 and played a Limited Overs Internationals (LOI) against the Zimbabwean national cricket team. South Africa won the match by six wickets. South Africa were captained by Kepler Wessels and Zimbabwe by David Houghton. It was the first-ever international match between the two countries in Zimbabwe.

== One Day Internationals (ODIs) ==
=== Only match ===
5 February 1992
Scorecard

| Zimbabwe; 170 all out (49.3 overs) | v | South Africa; 171/4 (49.2 overs) |
| Wayne James 27; Allan Donald 3/29 (10 overs) | | Peter Kirsten 64; Eddo Brandes 2/26 (10 overs) |

South Africa won by 6 wickets
Harare Sports Club, Harare
Umpires: Kantilal Kanjee and Ian Robinson
Player of the match: Peter Kirsten (SA)

- South Africa won the toss and decided to field
- The match was played the day before both sides flew to Australia for the 1992 Cricket World Cup.
