= Tatenda Tsumba =

Zimbabwean sprinter

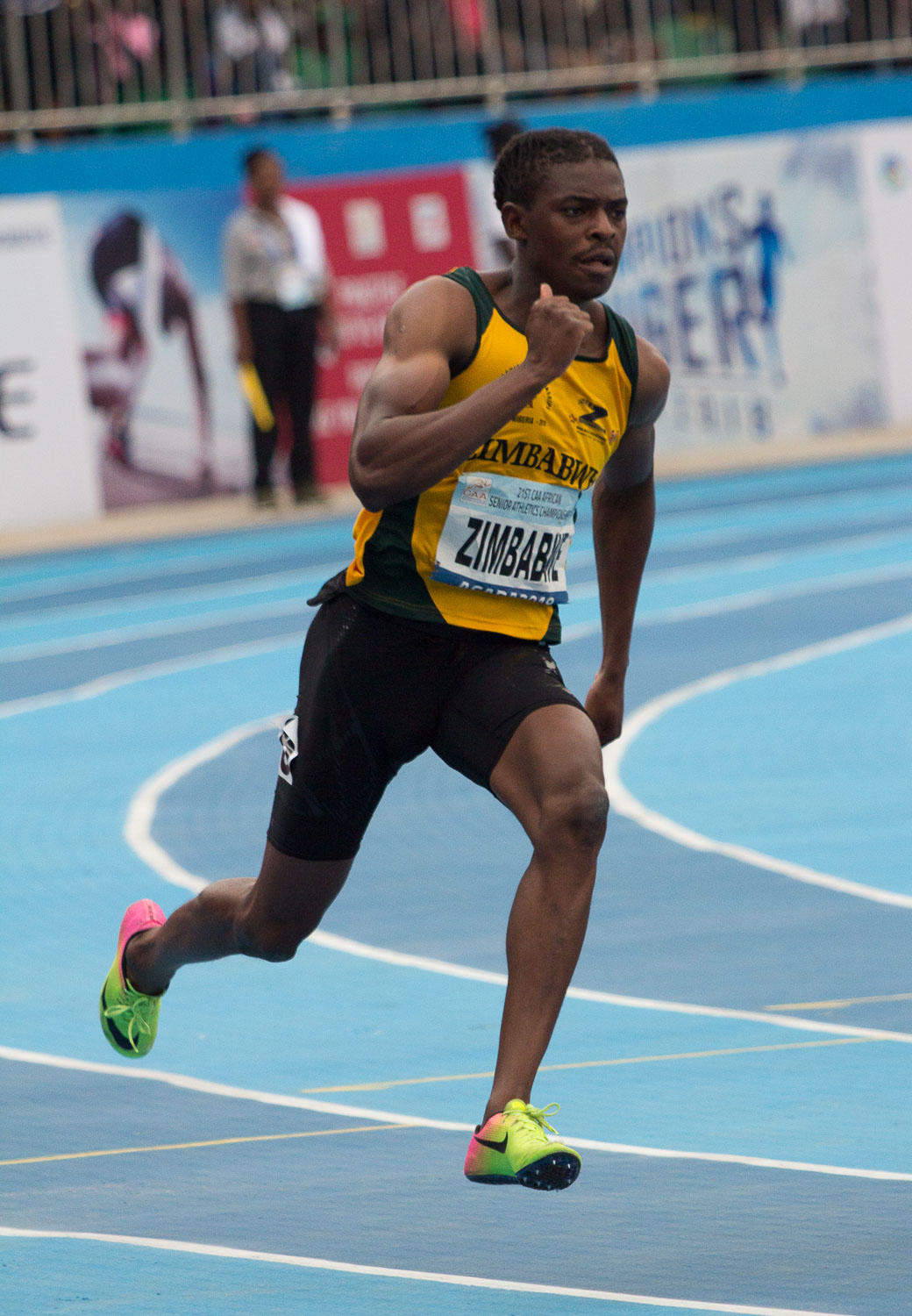
- Tatenda Tsumba at the 2018 African Athletics Championships

Personal information
- Born: 12 November 1991 (age 34) Harare, Zimbabwe
- Height: 1.83 m (6 ft 0 in)
- Weight: 79 kg (174 lb)

Sport
- Country: Zimbabwe
- Sport: Athletics
- Event: 200 metres
- Updated on 29 August 2015

Tatenda Tsumba (born 12 November 1991) is a male Zimbabwean sprinter. He competed in the 200 metres at the 2015 World Championships.

== International competitions ==
Year	Competition	Venue	Position	Event	Notes
Representing Zimbabwe
2015	World Championships	Beijing, China	46th (h)	200 m	21.21
2016	Olympic Games	Rio de Janeiro, Brazil	69th (h)	200 m	21.04
2018	African Championships	Asaba, Nigeria	8th (sf)	100 m	10.45
2018	African Championships	Asaba, Nigeria	4th	200 m	20.70
2019	World Relays	Yokohama, Japan	–	4 × 100 m relay	DQ
2019	African Games	Rabat, Morocco	20th (h)	200 m	21.13^{1}
2019	African Games	Rabat, Morocco	6th	4 × 100 m relay	39.82

^{1}Disqualified in the semifinal

== Personal bests ==
Outdoor

- 100 metres – 10.17 (+1.3 m/s, Chula Vista 2016)
- 200 metres – 20.44 (+1.3 m/s, Chula Vista 2016)

Indoor

- 60 metres – 6.71 (Provo 2017)
- 200 metres – 21.16 (Colorado Springs 2016)
