= Australian cricket team in Zimbabwe in 1999–2000 =

The Australian national cricket team visited Zimbabwe in October 1999. They played one Test and three One Day Internationals (ODIs) against the Zimbabwean national cricket team. Australia won the Test match and won the ODI series 3–0. Australia were captained by Steve Waugh and Zimbabwe by Alistair Campbell. The Test was the last of Ian Healy's 119 Tests for Australia.

== Test series ==
=== Only Test ===
14–17 October 1999
Scorecard

Zimbabwe	v	Australia
194 (85 overs); Neil Johnson 75 (186); Glenn McGrath 3/44 (23 overs)		422 (139.4 overs); Steve Waugh 151* (351); Heath Streak 5/93 (34 overs)
232 (122.1 overs); Murray Goodwin 91 (263); Glenn McGrath 3/46 (31 overs)		5/0 (0.4 overs); Greg Blewett 4* (3)

Australia won by 10 wickets
Harare Sports Club, Harare
Umpires: Ian Robinson (Zim) and George Sharp (Eng)
Player of the match: Steve Waugh (Aus)

- Zimbabwe won the toss and elected to bat.
- Trevor Gripper (Zim) made his Test debut.

== ODI series ==
=== 1st ODI ===
21 October 1999
Scorecard

Australia; 303/6 (50 overs)	v	Zimbabwe; 220 (43.4 overs)
Mark Waugh 106 (97); Gary Brent 2/63 (10 overs)		Neil Johnson 110 (124); Damien Fleming 3/33 (8 overs)

Australia won by 83 runs
Queens Sports Club, Bulawayo
Umpires: Graeme Evans (Zim) and Russell Tiffin (Zim)
Player of the match: Mark Waugh (Aus)

- Zimbabwe won the toss and elected to field.

=== 2nd ODI ===
23 October 1999
Scorecard

Zimbabwe; 116 (37.3 overs)	v	Australia; 117/1 (28.3 overs)
Trevor Madondo 29 (54); Damien Fleming 3/14 (10 overs)		Mark Waugh 54* (95); Andy Blignaut 1/24 (6 overs)

Australia won by 9 wickets
Harare Sports Club, Harare
Umpires: Kevan Barbour (Zim) and Ian Robinson (Zim)
Player of the match: Damien Fleming (Aus)

- Australia won the toss and elected to field.

=== 3rd ODI ===
24 October 1999
Scorecard

Zimbabwe; 200/9 (50 overs)	v	Australia; 201/1 (39 overs)
Andy Flower 99* (111); Glenn McGrath 2/18 (10 overs)		Ricky Ponting 87* (110); David Mutendera 1/42 (6 overs)

Australia won by 9 wickets
Harare Sports Club, Harare
Umpires: Ian Robinson (Zim) and Russell Tiffin (Zim)
Player of the match: Andy Flower (Zim)

- Australia won the toss and elected to field.
