= Graeme Hick =

English cricketer

Personal information
- Full name: Graeme Ashley Hick
- Born: 23 May 1966 (age 60); Salisbury, Rhodesia
- Nickname: Hicky, Ash
- Height: 6 ft 3 in (1.91 m)
- Batting: Right-handed
- Bowling: Right-arm off break
- Role: Batsman

International information
- National sides: Zimbabwe (1983–1986); England (1991–2001)
- Test debut (cap 548): 6 June 1991; England v West Indies
- Last Test: 7 March 2001; England v Sri Lanka
- ODI debut (cap 112): 23 May 1991; England v West Indies
- Last ODI: 27 March 2001; England v Sri Lanka

Domestic team information
- Years: Team
- 1984–2008: Worcestershire
- 1987/88–1988/89: Northern Districts
- 1988–1991: MCC
- 1990/91: Queensland
- 1997/98: Auckland

Career statistics
Competition	Test	ODI	FC	LA
Matches	65	120	526	651
Runs scored	3,383	3,846	41,112	22,059
Batting average	31.32	37.33	52.23	41.30
100s/50s	6/18	5/27	136/158	40/139
Top score	178	126*	405*	172*
Balls bowled	3,057	1,236	20,889	8,604
Wickets	23	30	232	225
Bowling average	56.78	34.20	44.43	29.55
5 wickets in innings	0	1	5	4
10 wickets in match	0	0	1	0
Best bowling	4/126	5/33	5/18	5/19
Catches/stumpings	90/–	64/–	709/–	289/–
Medal record
Men's Cricket
Representing England
ICC Cricket World Cup
Runner-up	1992 Australia and New Zealand
- Source: CricInfo, 14 September 2016

Graeme Ashley Hick MBE (born 23 May 1966) is a Zimbabwean-born former England cricketer who played 65 Test matches and 120 One Day Internationals for England. He was born in Rhodesia, and as a young man played international cricket for Zimbabwe. He played English county cricket for Worcestershire for his entire English domestic career, a period of well over twenty years, and in 2008 surpassed Graham Gooch's record for the most matches in all forms of the game combined. He was a part of the English squad which finished as runners-up at the 1992 Cricket World Cup.

He scored more than 40,000 first-class runs, mostly from number three in the order, and he is one of only three players to have passed 20,000 runs in List A cricket (Graham Gooch and Sachin Tendulkar are the others) and is one of only twenty-five players to have scored 100 centuries in first-class cricket. He is the only cricketer who scored first-class triple hundreds in three different decades (1988, 1997 and 2002). He is the second highest run scorer of all time after Graham Gooch, and the second highest century scorer after Jack Hobbs. Despite these achievements, he is commonly held to have underachieved in international cricket, a view based on comparison of Hick's overall first-class batting average of 52.23 vis-à-vis his Test average of 31.32.

At one time Hick's bowling was a significant force, and his off-spin claimed more than 200 first-class wickets. However, after 2001 he rarely bowled, and took only one first-class and two List A wickets; indeed, after the 2004 season he did not bowl a single ball in either form of the game. Throughout his career he was an outstanding slip fielder: Gooch wrote in his autobiography that his ideal slip cordon would comprise Mark Taylor, Ian Botham and Hick.

Hick was granted a benefit season by Worcestershire in 1999, which raised over £345,000; he was also awarded a testimonial in 2006. Hick retired from county cricket at the end of the 2008 season, to take up a coaching post at Malvern College. For the remaining part of the season, he joined Chandigarh Lions of the Indian Cricket League.

== Early life ==
Born in Salisbury, Rhodesia (now Harare, Zimbabwe) into a tobacco-farming family, Hick was at first more interested in hockey than cricket, and indeed went on to play for the national schools hockey team. He was also more of a bowler than a batsman, but in 1979 he began to make big scores regularly, averaging 185 for the school side. He suffered from a mild form of meningitis in 1980, but he nevertheless progressed to become captain of the national Junior Schools team, and before long to play for the Senior Schools side. He attended Prince Edward School.

Aged just 16, Hick played three minor one-day games for Zimbabwe Colts and Zimbabwe Country Districts against Young Australia in 1982–83. He had no success with the bat, being dismissed for 0, 2 and 1, although he did bowl Dean Jones in the second match at Mutare. Hick was included in the Zimbabwean squad for the 1983 World Cup, the youngest player ever to achieve such a status, but was not selected to play in the tournament. The following Zimbabwean season, on 7 October 1983, Hick made his first-class debut for Zimbabwe against Young West Indies at Harare. Coming in at number eight in the first innings, he hit 28 not out to help set up a narrow three-wicket victory. Eight days later Hick made his List A debut against the same opponents, batting one place lower still and making 16* in a game decided (in Zimbabwe's favour) on run rate.

On 7 December 1983, Hick took his maiden first-class wicket, bowling Sri Lanka Test batsman Susil Fernando while playing for Zimbabwe against a Sri Lanka Board President's XI. Four days later, Hick made his maiden first-class fifty when he scored 57 against a Sri Lankan XI, and in March 1984 he achieved the same in a one-day match by hitting 62* against Young India – a performance for which he was named Man of the Match for the first time. Looking back on this period two decades later, Steve Waugh considered that at 18 Hick was as good a player as anyone of that age in the history of cricket.

== Domestic career ==
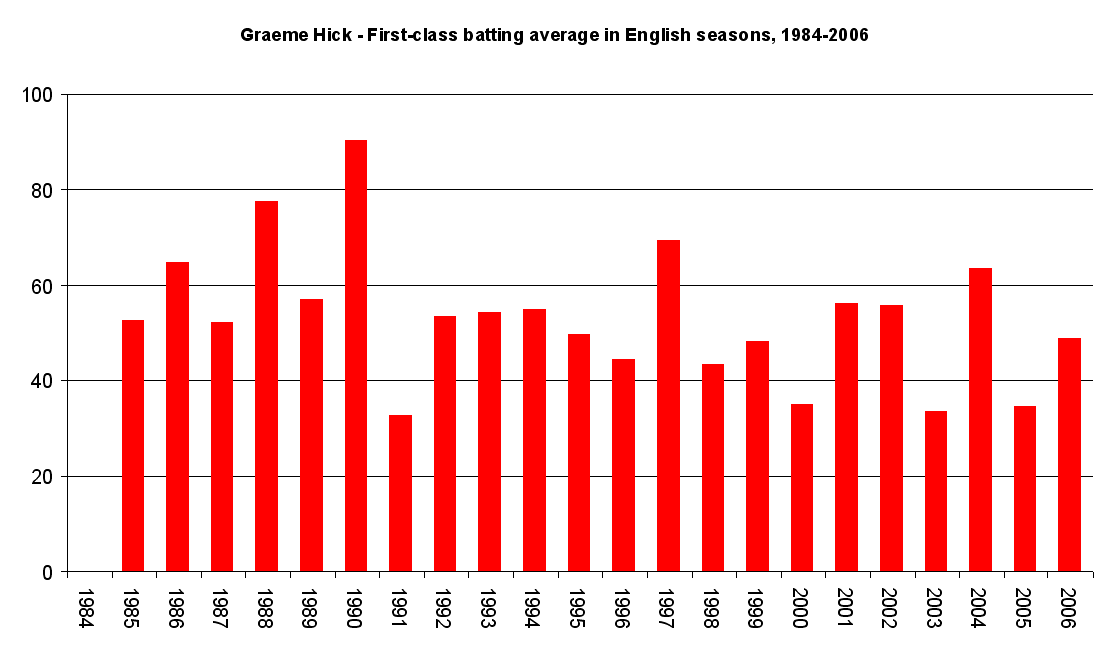
Hick's first-class batting average in each English summer

In 1984, Hick came to England on a scholarship from the Zimbabwe Cricket Union. For Worcestershire's Second XI he was impressive: he twice took five wickets in an innings, and a prolific sequence of 195, 0, 170 and 186 gained him a first-team debut against Surrey in the last match of the 1984 County Championship. Worcestershire declared in their first innings, and Hick did not get to bat, but in the second – coming in at nine – he made 82*. He also played club cricket for Kidderminster in the Birmingham League. He hit 1,234 runs for the club that year, a Kidderminster record.

Hick spent the winter playing for Zimbabwe, his highest scores being 95 and 88 in separate matches against Young New Zealand. Hick's good year in 1984 encouraged him to continue playing in England, and in the English summer that followed, Zimbabwe toured England, and Hick played both for them and for his county. He enjoyed a successful season, ending with a batting average of 52.70, and scoring his first century: 230 for the Zimbabweans against Oxford University. This was to be the first of six successive English seasons in which Hick averaged more than fifty in first-class cricket.

Playing that winter in Zimbabwe, he made 309 in under seven hours in a minor match against Ireland, the highest score ever made in any form of cricket for either Zimbabwe or its predecessor Rhodesia. The 1986 English season was the first year in which Hick was notably successful in the one-day game: he hit 889 List A runs that year at an average slightly over forty. 1986 also saw the 20-year-old Hick – newly capped by Worcestershire – become the youngest player to make 2,000 first-class runs in a season, while in 1987, he was named as one of Wisden's five Cricketers of the Year. He also had a highly successful season in one-day cricket as Worcestershire won the Refuge Assurance League, passing 1,000 List A runs for the only time, averaging over seventy in such games and making a one-day career-best 172* against Devon in the NatWest Trophy. By now Hick's career first-class average was well over sixty, and excitement about his run-scoring ability was becoming enormous.

The following summer, Hick made a major contribution to his county's first County Championship title since 1974. He became the first man since Glenn Turner, and only the eighth in history, to hit 1,000 first-class runs before the end of May, with 410 of those runs coming in April alone, a record for that month until Ian Bell scored 480 in April 2005. In the first week of May he made his highest first-class score, 405 not out against Somerset, and at that point the thousand seemed almost inevitable. However, Hick's next four innings totalled a mere 32, leaving him with the daunting task of making 153 runs in the last match of the month, against the touring West Indians at New Road. Hick did it on the first day, ending 172 not out and scoring a total of 1,019 runs before the end of May. In all that season he scored a career-best aggregate of 2,713 runs including ten first-class hundreds, matching the Worcestershire record set by Glenn Turner in 1970. One of these, a 79-ball knock against Surrey in August, won the Walter Lawrence Trophy for the fastest century of the season. To cap it all, he was also named Player of the Year by the Professional Cricketers' Association.

In both 1987–88 and 1988–89 Hick spent his winters playing in New Zealand for Northern Districts. He was a great success, hitting ten centuries in all and averaging 63.61 in the former season and a startling 94.46 in the latter; in one game against Auckland he scored a first-class record 173 runs between tea and close of play. It was at this time that John Bracewell called him a "flat-track bully", a comment which was to dog Hick throughout his England career. Back in England, the 1989 season when Worcestershire retained the Championship (with Hick's 26 wickets at under 20 the best return of his career) and, especially, the "batsmen's paradise" 1990 season saw Hick continue to pile up the big scores. He scored well over 4,000 first-class runs in the two years combined and averaged 90.46 in 1990, his highest average in any English summer and overall second only to his aforementioned New Zealand season. He followed that up with a reasonably successful winter playing for Queensland, and in March 1991 scored 91 for Worcestershire against Zimbabwe at Harare, but already the public's mind was firmly on the summer, when he would qualify to play for England.

By the time of his final matches for the England team in 2000–01, Hick had already spent one summer as captain of Worcestershire, a post which he held for three seasons (2000 to 2002 inclusive). He enjoyed the responsibility of captaincy, and was "surprised and disappointed" to be relieved of the position in favour of Ben Smith for the 2003 season.

Hick's personal form during his captaincy was generally good, although his overall statistics in 2000 – the first time he had failed to reach 1,000 runs since 1984 – were depressed by his England travails; in the County Championship alone in those three summers he averaged 43.41, 60.43 and 52.58, and by making 200* at Durham he completed the set of having made first-class hundreds against all 17 other counties, both home and away. In one-day games the picture was somewhat more mixed, though in June 2001 he did make 155, his highest List A score for 14 years, against Hertfordshire in the C&G Trophy.

Hick suffered badly from injuries at this time. He had missed the very end of the 2002 season with a broken thumb, and newly returned to the ranks for 2003 he endured a summer to forget. He began solidly enough, with two centuries and four fifties in his first 14 innings in all cricket, but in early June he broke his hand and was unable to play for six weeks.

At this point Hick was averaging 53 in first-class cricket, but the 13 innings he played after his return in late July produced only 246 runs, leaving him with a season's average of just 33.50, his worst showing since the dark days of 1991. 2004, however, saw him return to form with a vengeance, his 1,589 first-class runs (at 63.56) his best aggregate since 1990 and the lowest of his four centuries being 158, and he was picked for the FICA World XI team in three one-day games against New Zealand in January 2005, these matches having List A but not ODI status.

The 2005 season saw Hick return to earth with a bump, enduring another very mixed year. A 176 and four further fifties in eight innings near the start of the summer was followed by an awful trot in which he batted 17 times without reaching 40, only 107 against Essex in the very last innings of the season saving his average from dropping below thirty for the first time ever. The following summer was much better, and he had the satisfaction first of scoring his hundredth century for Worcestershire, only the second man (after Boycott) since the war to achieve the feat for a single county; and then of helping Worcestershire to promotion in the last game of the Championship season – his 500th first-class match – scores of 70 and 30* against Northamptonshire taking him past 1,000 runs for the season. The previous month he had signed a one-year extension to his county contract, having turned down an offer from Derbyshire. Hick commented: "My heart has always been with Worcestershire and I very much look forward to the next 12 months."

In April 2007, just before Worcestershire's 2007 campaign got underway, Hick said that despite being contracted only for the season, he did not want to retire at the end of the summer. He said, "I am not looking at it as my last season ... a lot of people say you are a long time retired ... I am still one of the fitter members of the side and I love and enjoy what I do ... Why should I pack it in if I am contributing?"

In June he became the 16th player to score 40,000 first-class runs, and the following month he agreed another extension to his contract to keep him at New Road for the 2008 season. In 2008, he became the first player to play in more than 1200 games. When he caught Oliver Newby off Kabir Ali at Cheltenham on 30 July, he achieved the rare feat of 1000 catches in a career. He retired at the end of the 2008 season to take up a coaching post at Malvern College. During the following winter, he played for the Chandigarh Lions in the rebel Indian Cricket League.

== International career ==
=== Early days ===
By the time the 1986 season was out, the possibility of Hick's playing at Test level was being taken seriously, and the debate was shifting from whether he would play international cricket to which country he would represent. At the time, Zimbabwe seemed a long way from Test status, so he set himself instead to fulfil the residency requirements for England qualification, and despite an offer of a four-year qualification period from New Zealand he opted to take the longer path of a seven-year wait to play for his newly adopted home. By the time he became eligible, public interest in his seeming destiny as a great batsman for country as well as county was intense; David Lloyd was later to write that he doubted "any cricketer [had] ever come into the international game burdened by such impossible expectations". Hick's Worcestershire teammate Graham Dilley had been in no doubt that he would succeed, perhaps ironically given what was to follow writing that Hick exerted "psychological pressure on the bowlers, like Viv Richards or Javed Miandad."

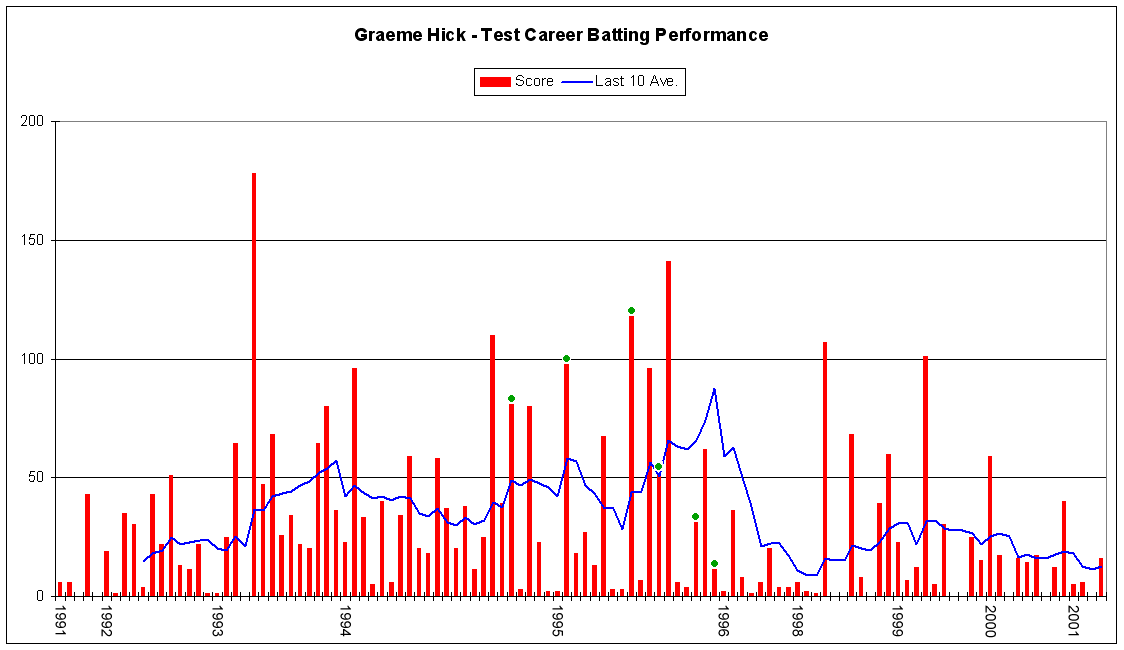
Hick's batting performance in Test matches

Hick made his first appearances as an England batsman in a three-match One Day International series against West Indies, the first being played at Edgbaston on 23 May 1991. He made only 14 in a low-scoring game, but a few days later, in the third and final match of the series, he hit 86* and shared in a match-winning stand of 213 with Neil Fairbrother. The stage seemed set for Hick's Test debut at Headingley on 6 June, and Hick was even pictured on the cover of the Radio Times. He was given a hero's reception by the crowd as he came out to bat, but a tortured 51 minutes later he was back in the pavilion having made only six, and he could do no better in the second innings. After further innings of 0, 43, 0, 19 and 1 he was dropped before the last match of the series. Although Worcestershire did win the Benson & Hedges Cup (Hick's 88 and three catches winning him the man of the match award in the final), and the Refuge Assurance Cup, in first-class cricket Hick finished with an average for the season of just 32.91, which remains his lowest in any English summer.

He then played all three Tests in New Zealand, but apart from a marathon bowling performance in the first innings at Wellington where he and Phil Tufnell shared 140 overs almost equally (Hick's 69–27–126–4 was to be his best in Tests), he again had little to smile about. Considerably more enjoyable for him was the 1992 World Cup which immediately followed: England reached the final, thanks in no small part to Hick's three half-centuries. The most important of these came in the semi-final against South Africa at the SCG. Although this game is now more often remembered for the rain-related fiasco which left South Africa needing an impossible 22 runs from one ball, it was Hick's Man-of-the-Match-winning knock of 83 (in an innings where the second top score was 33) which made England's victory possible in the first place. He could not replicate it in the final, being lbw to Mushtaq Ahmed for 17.

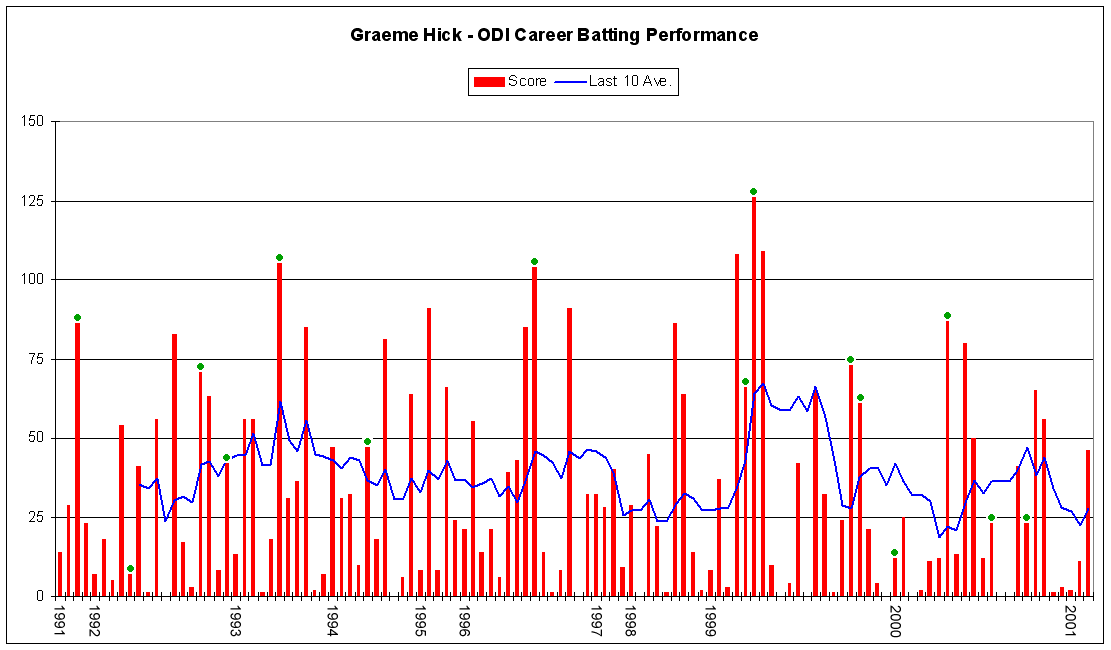
Hick's batting performance in One-Day Internationals

In 1992 Hick finally made a Test half-century, 51 against Pakistan, but as with the West Indian series he was dropped before the end of the summer. This time at least he scored heavily for Worcestershire, averaging nearly seventy for his county. This domestic form, together with his ability against spin bowling, secured Hick a place on the 1992–93 tour of India, and in a generally disastrous tour for England (they lost two Tests by an innings and the other by eight wickets) he was one of the very few bright spots; indeed, he topped both batting and bowling averages for his country, as well as scoring 249 runs in the six ODIs. The personal highlight for Hick was his long-awaited maiden Test hundred: 178 in the third Test at Bombay; he added another 47 in the second innings. He then scored 68 and 26 in the one-off Test against Sri Lanka which immediately followed. For his achievements in the subcontinent, he was named one of Indian Cricket's five Cricketers of the Year in 1993.

=== Successful years ===
The Indian tour proved to be the start of by far the most successful period of Hick's Test career. At the end of 1992 his average was a mere 18.06, but by the end of the South African series just over three years later it had improved to a very respectable 38.66; his average over those three years alone was an impressive 46.44. In the first ODI of 1993 Hick made 85, but in the first Ashes Test at Old Trafford, he was famously sledged by Merv Hughes, leading umpire Dickie Bird to ask him: "What has that nice Mr Hick ever done to you?" Hughes later commented that although he had been "a bit OTT with Hick"; he "only sledged batsmen [he] respected".

Despite scores of 34, 22, 20 and 64, Hick – along with Mike Gatting – was dropped after the second Test at Lord's; the decision amazed Shane Warne. Hick was recalled for the sixth Test at The Oval and hit 80 and 36 in a 161-run England victory, giving him a series average of 42.66, behind only Gooch, Atherton and Thorpe among England's specialist batsmen in a series in which England used 24 players.

A reasonable tour of the West Indies followed, although Hick narrowly failed to make a maiden hundred against this opposition when he was dismissed for 96 in the Jamaican Test, and did not make a fifty in five ODI innings. Then came two short series against New Zealand and South Africa; he played in all six Tests and reached double figures in all ten innings, although he was not particularly successful against New Zealand, with a top score of only 58. Against the South Africans, however, he averaged over sixty, making 110 in the Second Test and a match-winning 81* (at a run a ball) in England's dash to victory in the Third. He played in three of the four ODIs and failed in two of them, but made another 81 against South Africa. He also helped Worcestershire to win the 1994 NatWest Trophy, sharing an unbroken partnership of 198 with Tom Moody in the final against a Warwickshire side which had swept the board with all the other domestic honours that year.

The 1994–95 Ashes series came to be known for one incident in particular. In the third Test at Sydney, England captain Mike Atherton had let it be known to his players that he intended to declare. Hick was nearing what would have been his first Ashes century, but Atherton felt he was scoring too slowly and that as a result the team were "dawdling". He took the decision to call the players in with Hick 98 not out. Hick was surprised and hurt not to be allowed to reach his hundred: Alec Stewart wrote later that his teammates "couldn't believe" the decision, and he felt that it "cost [England] dearly". Atherton admitted in his autobiography that although he still felt the declaration had been justified in strictly cricketing terms, he would not have taken such a decision again. Phil Tufnell felt similarly, saying that while there was a match to win, "a few of [the team] were also very sorry for Hick." Jonathan Agnew's sympathies, however, lay with the captain, telling Atherton that his "conscience should be clear".

Hick seemed to be overcoming his disappointment over the next few days, making a match-winning 91 in a World Series Cup ODI – a performance which lifted him to second behind only Brian Lara in the world rankings — and following up with 143 in a four-day game against Victoria. But he did not get a chance to make that Ashes century: a slipped disc ended his tour just before the fourth Test. He never came so close to one again. Hick's injury and the declaration affair overshadowed what up to that point had been a somewhat mixed series as far as the Tests had been concerned: in his other five innings he had been dismissed cheaply three times, but he had also made 80 at Brisbane.

West Indies visited in 1995, and Hick – an "automatic pick" for Atherton at this point in his career – enjoyed a good summer, averaging just over 50 in the Tests (despite being dropped for the fourth Test at Old Trafford), with the highlights being 118* at Trent Bridge (he had been told the previous day by Ray Illingworth that he had a "soft centre") and then 96 and 51* in the final Test at The Oval. He also averaged over 50 in the County Championship, and took a career-best 5–18 against Leicestershire in early July. In the Benson & Hedges Cup, he scored three hundreds in five matches as Worcestershire reached the semi-final. In that game, Hick made 109 and took two wickets, but Lancashire won a close contest with four balls to spare.

That winter's tour was to South Africa, and Hick made a superb hundred on the first day of the first Test at Centurion Park; Allan Donald later conceded that "he hammered us". He advanced his score to 141 the next day before falling lbw to Pollock, but appalling weather washed out the last three days of the game and the match was drawn. Hick, having reached his highest ever Test ranking of seventh, played in all five Tests and seven ODIs on that tour, but passed fifty only twice. The 1996 World Cup in the subcontinent immediately followed, but 85 against New Zealand was his only major contribution against top-class opposition.

=== Back to the struggle ===
Hick seemed set fair for another productive season in 1996, especially after making 215 for Worcestershire against the Indians in May, but it was not to be. His form completely deserted him as he could manage just 35 runs in four innings against India, and when he was dismissed cheaply twice in the first Test against Pakistan the selectors had had enough and he was dropped from both Test and ODI teams, not to be selected again for a year and a half. Back at Worcestershire, he scored unevenly: immediately after his being dropped by England he made 148 and 86 against Kent, but he then endured a run of ten innings in all cricket without making more than 30, before hitting 54 and 106 against Gloucestershire in the penultimate Championship game of the season.

For the first time since becoming eligible to play for England, Hick was omitted from the winter tour parties altogether, an omission particularly painful as the programme was to include not only a return to New Zealand but the first ever Tests between Zimbabwe and England. In the event Hick did play in the country, but only as part of Worcestershire's own tour; he took six wickets in their match against a Matabeleland Invitation XI in what must have been a bittersweet experience. The 1997 English season was the first for seven years in which Hick had no international duties to perform, and he averaged 69 in scoring over 1,500 first-class runs, the highlight being an unbeaten 303 in the final match of the season against Hampshire, sharing in an unbroken third-wicket partnership of 438 with Tom Moody, an English record for that wicket and a Worcestershire record for any wicket. Hick was recalled to England duties for the Singer-Akai Champions Trophy ODI series at Sharjah in December 1997, and in April 1998 for just the ODI portion of the West Indies series. He played in nine games altogether, but though he got starts on several occasions he never reached fifty.

Hick began the 1998 season slowly and was left out of the England team at the start of the year, but he responded with four hundreds in successive first-class innings in late May and early June. Although this form left him somewhat thereafter, he was nevertheless selected for the final two Tests against South Africa. A total of nine runs from three innings left his hopes of a place on the Ashes tour looking extremely shaky, but after two half-centuries in ODIs and then 107 in the one-off Test against Sri Lanka it seemed he might have done just enough. However, his century was outshone by John Crawley's 156 in the same innings and in the end it was the Lancashire man who got the nod. Hick was left at home, to console himself with the memory of the adulation of the Worcestershire crowd: in May at New Road he had made his hundredth first-class century.

Just before the first Test, however, Hick received an emergency call-up – officially as "reinforcement" rather than a replacement – as Atherton was in severe pain from a chronic back problem (ankylosing spondylitis). Hick ended up playing in four Tests, but he had a rather poor series overall, averaging 25, although his defiant 68 in a losing cause at Perth stuck in the memory and his 39 and 60 contributed significantly to England's 12-run win at Melbourne (even if Dean Headley's 6–60 was more remarked upon). In the ODIs against both Australia and Sri Lanka Hick did much better, making more than 500 runs – including a fine run of 108, 66*, 126* and 109 in successive innings – and being named England's Man of the Series.

The 1999 World Cup was held in England, and after Hick's ODI achievements in Australia Allan Donald felt he would be the home team's danger man. David Lloyd also "strongly fancied [Hick] to have a serious influence" on the competition, but he was frustrated by Hick's reluctance to accept a flexible batting order, only with considerable difficulty at a "frosty team meeting" getting him to agree to drop down from three when required. Despite Hick's uneasiness over the issue, and England's general incompetence in the tournament, he averaged 53 – second only to Nasser Hussain, the only one of his teammates to average more than 30. Frustratingly for Hick, the series against New Zealand that followed contained no one-dayers at all, and he was picked for only the third of the four Tests, making 12 in his only innings. It was no real surprise that he was picked for only the ODI part of the winter tour to South Africa and the short ODI series in Zimbabwe which followed. He failed badly in South Africa (averaging a desperate 12.40) and by the time the Zimbabwe leg of the tour began he had not reached 30 in nine successive innings, by far the worst run of his ODI career, but 87*, 13 and 80 (as well as an international career-best 5–33 in the last game) against the Zimbabweans rescued his winter.

The 2000 Test series against West Indies began with humiliation both for England, who lost by an innings inside three days at Edgbaston, and for Hick, who made his only Test pair. Things improved for the team thereafter, with England recovering to win the series 3–1, but Hick's real influence was limited to the fourth Test at Headingley, where his 59 (from number eight, as Andy Caddick had come in ahead of him as night-watchman) and his stand of 98 with Michael Vaughan rescued England from 124/6 and paved the way for Caddick's extraordinary burst of 5–14 and England's own victory inside two days. In the ODIs Hick had a very mixed summer, sharing in two century partnerships but averaging barely 25 with a top score of 50 in seven games. It was the beginning of the end for his international career.

=== Retirement ===
On what was to prove his last winter tours for England, of Kenya, Pakistan and Sri Lanka, Hick played five Tests and six ODIs, but only twice were his contributions of real value. In an ODI at Karachi he came in at 13/2 and put on 114 with Hussain, then in the deciding Test at the same venue his 40 gave vital support to Graham Thorpe (64*) as England clinched a nail-biting win in the face of Pakistani delaying tactics and light so bad that Alec Stewart said they "wouldn't have played in light like that for club games". Despite these bright spots, overall Hick's winter had been far from a success, and the Test series ended in early March with scores of 0 and 16 at Kandy. He took the field in Colombo only as a substitute, but still managed to incur a one-match suspended ban for sledging. It was irrelevant: he never played Test cricket again. Later that month he played in the three ODIs against Sri Lanka, and in the last of them he top scored with 46. England, though, were crushed by ten wickets, and Hick's international playing days were at an end.

== Post-retirement ==
Hick was appointed Member of the Order of the British Empire (MBE) in the 2009 Birthday Honours. He said, "I am very honoured with the award. It was not something I expected or set out to achieve. You dream of things and after 25 years it is nice to have that sort of recognition."

In January 2014, Hick was appointed high performance coach at Cricket Australia's centre of excellence. In September 2016, Hick was promoted to the role of Batting Coach of the Australian side. In June 2020, Hick was made redundant as batting coach, a result of cost-cutting measures made by Cricket Australia due to the COVID-19 pandemic.

== Assessment ==
Hick's inability to replicate in Test cricket on a consistent basis the form which he had shown for his county was and remains the subject of much debate. Steve Waugh, in his autobiography, theorised that county cricket attacks, which Hick regularly "carved up", "were (in fact) a dangerous impediment to his improvement, because any technical weakness went largely untested", due to these attacks being of a "largely innocuous" nature. Indeed, much of the criticism aimed at him has been on the subject of perceived technical flaws in his game: Atherton felt as early as 1991 that Hick was "good, but not in the Lara or Tendulkar class", and that his technique was flawed, allowing "little give in his hands and no touch in his shots", although by the mid-1990s he had adjusted to an "altogether more fluid and natural" style. Many writers adjudged Hick, in Christopher Martin-Jenkins' words, "suspect against the short ball", and Allan Lamb felt that the one-bouncer-per-over regulation in force in county cricket in the early 1990s hindered Hick too, despite the fact that Wasim Akram believed that the introduction of a similar rule in Test cricket had been specifically for Hick's benefit. (Hick's performance in Tests against Pakistan was far worse than against any other nation.) Alec Stewart's analysis was that Hick "didn't get out all that much" to the short ball, but nevertheless "didn't play it as confidently as other shots", because his height (6'3") made him uncertain as to whether to duck or attack the bouncers. Dickie Bird's opinion was that "the positioning of his feet [was] all wrong ... and that [threw] his head and eyes off line".

Hick's mental approach to the game is the other main weapon in his critics' armoury, and indeed Hick himself admitted to seeking psychological help after having failed. Prior to Hick's England debut Graham Dilley was bullish, claiming that Hick was "a lot tougher than people realise", but Ian Botham, another Worcestershire teammate, noticed "the amount of reassurance [Hick] seemed to need from others around him" and Peter Roebuck, in a famous piece in the 1999 Wisden, said that it was "Hick's fate to be given an ability that did not suit his temperament". Jonathan Agnew felt his body language against Curtly Ambrose back in 1991 had been poor, and had almost invited his dismissal, and Atherton wrote that if Hick had indeed failed to do justice to his talent, it was surely "down to a vital missing ingredient in his mental make-up". Waugh appears to link this 'missing ingredient' to his dominance in county cricket, stating that "prior to his Test debut his capacity to overcome hardship was never called upon". Waugh also cites the aforementioned 1995 declaration by Michael Atherton as a possible reason for Hick's lack of success in Test cricket, stating that "just as Hick's ... gifts were about to re-emerge, in stepped ... Atherton to extinguish the flame." George Dobell was tougher, stating bluntly that Hick "should have been strong enough to cope".

Some felt that Hick was the victim of poor man-management, and Hick himself let his feelings slip in 2002, when asked who had been his best coach. "That's the trouble," he replied. "There haven't been any." Shane Warne felt he was "a classic example of a player who [had] really been messed around", and Ian Botham complained that when England had failed it always seemed to be "Hicky's neck [that was] the first on the line", although the journalist Leo McKinstry criticised Botham's "noisy advocacy of Hick in the face of all the evidence".

Ray Illingworth's treatment of Hick has also come under considerable scrutiny. Botham considered Illingworth to be "totally out of touch with the modern game", while the 1995 incident mentioned briefly above, when Illingworth told Hick he had "a soft centre" because of his "mollycoddled upbringing", made even Atherton wince at his bluntness. (Hick, told by Illingworth to "go out and prove [him] wrong", went on to score 118* against West Indies the following day.) However, Illingworth himself, while considering that Hick, along with Mark Ramprakash, was "intense, too much so for [his] liking", did allow that the length of time Hick had had to wait to qualify for England was a factor in his becoming "much more set in his ways than an inexperienced batsman."

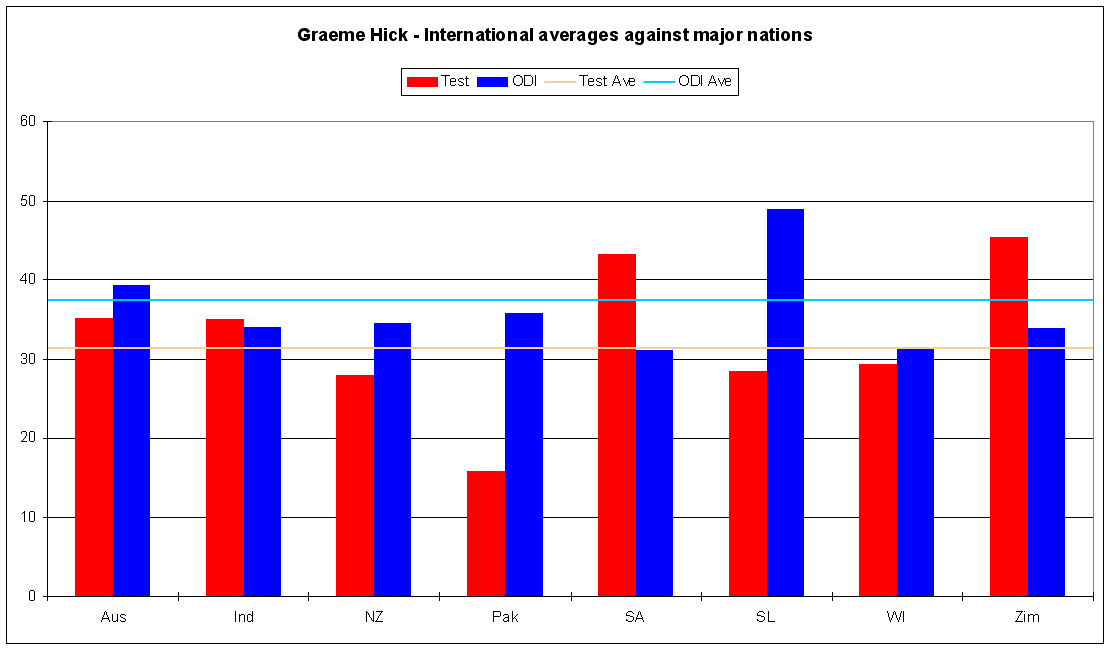
Hick's Test and ODI averages against each opponent

Hick's ODI statistics are considerably better than his equivalent Test figures, and his eventual career average of 37.33 is higher than any of Gooch, Thorpe and Gower. Indeed, for a period of more than two years from February 1994 Hick was never ranked lower than tenth in the world ODI rankings, and at the time of his omission from the one-day team halfway through 1996 he was rated number six. Even for the final two years of his ODI career, he was always ranked in the top twenty.

In this form of the game, he could destroy even the best: Andrew Flintoff recalled an innings of 65 against Pakistan at Sharjah in 1999 when Hick "was murdering" the "seriously rapid" Shoaib Akhtar: "If he dropped short, he pulled him and if [he] bowled full, he was driven." Calls for Hick's recall to the one-day team continued long after his Test career had been given up as a lost cause: Kent captain Matthew Fleming said in September 2001 that Hick was "still the best one-day batsman in the country" and as late as 2004 Andrew Miller would write: "whisper it softly, there is still a case for his inclusion in the one-day squad". Hick himself still felt in early 2002 that he could "offer more in the one-day environment than the majority of people playing in the side".

Despite his difficulties, Hick's cricketing contemporaries have generally been quite complimentary about him. Atherton "liked and respected" him, while Andrew Flintoff, as a newcomer to the England side, remembered Hick as "being good to [him] during those early stages [of Flintoff's Test career]". As a batsman, Allan Donald wrote that Hick was "highly rated by the South African guys". and Warne called him "purely and simply a quality player". Steve Waugh said that Hick "had as much talent as any player I ever came across." David Lloyd noted, not altogether with approval, that other players would rally around Hick protectively, and that "in Alec Stewart he had a man who would champion his cause endlessly". Stewart himself wrote that Hick was "someone whose talents [he] admire[d] greatly".

Botham summed up the unending nature of the debate when he wrote: "I have no answers. All I can do is wonder how much more English cricket might have got out of Graeme Hick had he been handled differently. I know he does as well." As for Hick himself, he was asked after the end of his England career whether he considered himself a success or a failure. His answer: "a bit of both".

== Notes ==
Sporting positions
Preceded by Tom Moody	Worcestershire County Cricket Captain; 2000–2002	Succeeded by Ben Smith
