= Everton Matambanadzo =

Zimbabwean cricketer (born 1976)

Personal information
- Born: 13 April 1976 (age 50); Zimbabwe
- Batting: Right-handed
- Bowling: Right-arm fast-medium
- Relatives: Darlington Matambanadzo (brother)

Career statistics
Competition	Test	ODI
Matches	3	7
Runs scored	17	8
Batting average	4.25	4.00
100s/50s	0/0	0/0
Top score	7	5*
Balls bowled	384	297
Wickets	4	11
Bowling average	62.50	19.72
5 wickets in innings	0	0
10 wickets in match	0	0
Best bowling	2/62	4/32
Catches/stumpings	0/–	1/–
- Source: Cricinfo, 11 February 2006

Everton Zvikomborero Matambanadzo (born 13 April 1976), is a Zimbabwean former cricketer who played in three Tests and seven One Day Internationals from 1996 to 1999. His cricket career was rather brief, due to recurring knee injuries.

== Personal life ==
Born at Salisbury in what was then Rhodesian, Matambanadzo has a twin brother, Darlington, who played first-class cricket for Mashonaland.

He moved to the United States in 2001.

He completed an economics degree at University of California, Berkeley and is currently a stock trader.
