= Danzel Becker =

South African cricketer and umpire (1948–2017)

Personal information
- Full name: Danzel Frank Becker
- Born: 21 January 1948; Pretoria, South Africa
- Died: 21 April 2017 (aged 69)
- Height: 6 ft 7 in (2.01 m)
- Batting: Right-handed
- Bowling: Right-arm medium

Domestic team information
- Years: Team
- 1968/69–1970/71: North-Eastern Transvaal
- 1971/72–1974/75: Transvaal

Umpiring information
- ODIs umpired: 16 (1997–2001)

Career statistics
Competition	First-class	List A
Matches	35	5
Runs scored	770	67
Batting average	18.78	16.75
100s/50s	0/4	0/0
Top score	57	35
Balls bowled	5,856	221
Wickets	112	8
Bowling average	23.10	20.50
5 wickets in innings	4	0
10 wickets in match	0	0
Best bowling	6/23	4/18
Catches/stumpings	18/–	1/–
- Source: Cricinfo, 7 August 2016

Danzel Frank Becker (21 January 1948 – 21 April 2017) was a South African cricketer and umpire. He played first-class cricket from 1969 to 1975, and umpired in sixteen ODI games from 1997 to 2001.

== See also ==
- List of One Day International cricket umpires
