= Neil Johnson (cricketer) =

Zimbabwean cricketer (born 1970)

Personal information
- Full name: Neil Clarkson Johnson
- Born: 24 January 1970 (age 56); Salisbury, Rhodesia
- Batting: Left-handed
- Bowling: Right-arm fast-medium
- Role: All-rounder

International information
- National side: Zimbabwe (1998–2000)
- Test debut (cap 40): 7 October 1998 v India
- Last Test: 1 June 2000 v England
- ODI debut (cap 55): 24 October 1998 v New Zealand
- Last ODI: 22 July 2000 v England

Career statistics
Competition	Test	ODI	FC	LA
Matches	13	48	161	232
Runs scored	532	1,679	7,569	7,019
Batting average	24.18	36.50	34.40	35.99
100s/50s	1/4	4/11	11/53	13/40
Top score	107	132*	150	146*
Balls bowled	1,186	1,503	14,754	6,135
Wickets	15	35	230	153
Bowling average	39.60	34.85	33.13	34.70
5 wickets in innings	0	0	2	0
10 wickets in match	0	0	0	0
Best bowling	4/77	4/42	5/79	4/19
Catches/stumpings	12/–	19/–	218/–	122/–
- Source: CricInfo, 5 August 2015

Neil Clarkson Johnson (born 24 January 1970) is a former Zimbabwean international cricketer who played 13 Test matches and 48 One Day Internationals between 1998 and 2000. An all-rounder, he bowled right-arm fast-medium and played in the middle order in test matches as an aggressive left-handed batsman. He usually opened the batting in one-day cricket.

Despite making sporadic appearances for Zimbabwe at international level, he made substantial contributions with both bat and ball in crucial match situations. In his brief international career, he made an impact as an aggressive opening batsman and also as an attacking fast bowler. He was an integral member of arguably Zimbabwe's best ODI team during the late 1990s. His career was cut short due to internal politics of Zimbabwe cricket, retiring in 2004 at the age of 34.

== Domestic career ==
Johnson was born in Salisbury (now Harare). Throughout his first-class career, he spent time in both South Africa and England, playing for Boland, Eastern Province, Natal, Western Province, Leicestershire and Hampshire. He played most of his first-class cricket in South Africa. Despite having lot of experience having played in South African domestic competitions, he was never in contention to make it into the South African national team in the 1990s due to the abundance of all-rounders in the South African set-up. His county stint with Leicestershire in 1997 proved his worth as a capable all-rounder.

== Early years ==
Johnson's father was a farmer in the Umvukwes (now Mvurwi) district in the north of Mashonaland. He began his primary education at the Umvukwes Primary School, where he rose to prominence at age seven after winning a selection for the school's colts’ team in the under-11 age category. When Zimbabwe gained independence from the United Kingdom in 1980, Johnson's father accepted a job as a farming consultant at Howick in Natal, and the family emigrated to South Africa. Johnson was ten years old at the time.

=== South Africa ===
Johnson continued his education at Howick High School and rose through the ranks as a young schoolboy cricketer, first with the Natal under-12 team, and then later the Natal B team for under-18 players. He then moved to Grahamstown to pursue his studies at Kingswood College, and opened the bowling alongside Brett Schultz for the Eastern Province schools team. He later broke into full South Africa schools team in 1988.

He scored a few centuries at high school with the first century coming at the age of 15. His father was a significant influence, taking him to attend net practice sessions. He was also coached as a teenager by Chris Stone, an English professional coach in South Africa. His talent was later spotted and identified by former international player Kepler Wessels, who helped him win a bursary to the University of Port Elizabeth, where he pursued a BA degree in Industrial Psychology. He also went onto play for University of Port Elizabeth's first XI and Eastern Province B team. He also made a few appearances for the full Eastern Province team in the Benson and Hedges Night Series. After the four years at the university, he was awarded a lucrative professional cricket contract with Natal and he agreed without any hesitation. Johnson often acknowledged Wessels, stating that his assistance helped him to work on his way to top-flight cricket.

Johnson considered Natal as his adopted home as he played most of his school and domestic cricket there. He made his first-class debut in the 1989–90 season in the Castle Bowl competition playing for Eastern Province B against the Natal B team. He had a breakthrough 1993–94 season for Natal where his all-round performance against Border, including a century and five wicket-haul, helped him to secure a place in the South Africa A lineup for their tour of Zimbabwe in 1994–95. He was then approached by Denis Streak of the Zimbabwe Cricket Union, who suggested that he return to Zimbabwe with a view to play international cricket for the country. However, he did not commit himself immediately due to his impending marriage.

=== Returning to Zimbabwe ===
Johnson returned to Harare in 1998 from Natal with the intention of representing his country of birth at international level, being in touch with former Zimbabwe player Andy Pycroft, who made arrangements for him to join the Zimbabwe team. He missed out on playing in the bilateral home ODI series against India in October 1998 due to a delay in receiving his Zimbabwean passport, but this was granted and Zimbabwean citizenship was restored by the authorities just 48 hours prior to the start of the one-off Test match at Harare. He broke into the Test squad as selectors deliberately kept their options wide open.

== International career ==
Johnson's Test debut was against India on 7 October 1998 at the Harare Sports Club. Despite not making any significant contributions with the bat on debut, he dismissed Sachin Tendulkar in both innings. Zimbabwe went onto register a 73-run victory after bowling out India cheaply for 173 runs.

He was subsequently picked in Zimbabwe's squad for the 1998 ICC KnockOut Trophy, which was also the inaugural ICC Champions Trophy. He made his ODI debut during the tournament in the preliminary round match against New Zealand in a thrilling contest where New Zealand secured a last ball victory chasing 259, and consequently Zimbabwe did not qualify for the quarter-final of the tournament.

In November 1998, during the Zimbabwe tour of Pakistan, he scored a century in Peshawar in only his second Test match, helping Zimbabwe to their first-ever Test victory in the country. Zimbabwe went onto eventually win the three match series 1–0, with the second Test match ending in a draw and the third being abandoned without a ball being bowled.

=== 1999 World Cup campaign ===
Johnson made a name for himself during the 1999 Cricket World Cup campaign, ending as the leading run-scorer as well as the leading wicket-taker for Zimbabwe during the tournament. He scored 367 runs at an average of 52.42 and took 12 wickets at an average of 19.41 in eight matches, where he opened both the batting and bowling. His tally of 367 runs in the 1999 World Cup was the most runs scored by a Zimbabwean in a single World Cup until his record was surpassed by Brendan Taylor during the 2015 tournament.

He was also influential in Zimbabwe's qualification to the Super Six stage of the 1999 World Cup, winning three Man-of-the-Match awards during the tournament. One of those awards came in his team's surprise victory over eventual semi-finalists South Africa. Opening the batting, he top-scored with 76 before dismissing Gary Kirsten with the first ball of the South African chase. He then dismissed Jacques Kallis for a duck and finished with 3 for 27.

In the same tournament, he took 2/43 before making an unbeaten 132 against eventual champions Australia at Lord's in a losing cause. During his innings, he hit Shane Warne for four boundaries, adding 114 runs for the second wicket with Murray Goodwin.

=== Post 1999 World Cup and retirement ===
During Australia's tour of Zimbabwe in October 1999, during the third ODI at the Queens Sports Club in Bulawayo, Johnson became the fastest Zimbabwean batsman to score 1000 runs in ODIs in just 28 innings. He top-scored for Zimbabwe with 110 during that match, which resulted in a 83 run defeat for Zimbabwe.

After the Zimbabwe's tour of England in 2000, Johnson announced he would be returning to South Africa and joining Western Province to play in the Supersport Series. The Zimbabwe Cricket Union confirmed that it would not renew its contract with him following his departure. He departed due to disputes over payments from the ZCU, and also had a strained relationship with the then head coach of Zimbabwe, David Houghton. He and his teammate Murray Goodwin's unceremonious exits from Zimbabwe cricket marked the beginning of Zimbabwe's decline in the 2000s.

== County cricket ==
Johnson spent one season, the 1997 English cricket season, at Leicestershire as their overseas player. He scored 819 runs at an average of 63 in 12 first-class matches, including two centuries, finishing the season as the county's high run-scorer. In 2001, he returned to county cricket when he was signed up by Hampshire for the 2001 season, but injuries often prevented him from bowling. He scored a century against Durham in the 2001 Cheltenham & Gloucester Trophy on his return to county cricket. He was offered a further one-year contract with the club for 2002. He was a regular member of the Hampshire team until the end of the 2002 season.

As well as county cricket, Johnson also played in the Lancashire League for two seasons, and for another two in the North Yorkshire and South Durham Cricket League.

== Coaching career ==
In 2010, online news stories circulated claiming that Johnson was to be appointed as the India cricket team's official yoga instructor during their tour of South Africa. It was claimed that Indian's South African coach, Gary Kirsten, had offered Johnson the role. The reports turned out to be false, with Johnson stating that he did not practice yoga.

He also served as head of cricket at Hilton College School in South Africa and also personally coached South African seamer Lungi Ngidi.
