= Gary Brent =

Zimbabwean cricketer

Personal information
- Full name: Gary Bazil Brent
- Born: 13 January 1976 (age 50); Sinoia, Rhodesia
- Height: 185 cm (6 ft 1 in)
- Batting: Right-handed
- Bowling: Right-arm medium-fast
- Role: All rounder
- Relatives: Jonathan Brent (uncle)

International information
- National side: Zimbabwe
- Test debut (cap 42): 18 November 1999 v Sri Lanka
- Last Test: 27 December 2001 v Sri Lanka
- ODI debut (cap 46): 30 October 1996 v Pakistan
- Last ODI: 2 February 2008 v Pakistan

Domestic team information
- Years: Team
- 1994/95–1998/99: Mashonaland
- 1999/00–2004/05: Manicaland
- 2006/07: Southerns
- 2007/08: Northerns

Career statistics
Competition	Test	ODI	FC	LA
Matches	4	70	61	129
Runs scored	35	408	2,066	934
Batting average	5.83	12.00	26.15	14.82
100s/50s	0/0	0/1	2/8	0/3
Top score	25	59*	130	64
Balls bowled	818	3,390	10,157	5,823
Wickets	7	75	186	135
Bowling average	44.85	37.01	25.27	34.09
5 wickets in innings	0	0	7	0
10 wickets in match	0	0	0	0
Best bowling	3/21	4/22	6/46	4/22
Catches/stumpings	1/–	20/–	30/–	33/–
- Source: CricketArchive (subscription required), 27 September 2008

Gary Bazil Brent (born 13 January 1976) is a former Zimbabwean cricketer.

Brent was an inswinging bowler, with a good slow-arm bowling technique. Having missed the cut for the 2003 Cricket World Cup, he made the national squad for the 2003/04 tour in Australia. Brent was one of the fifteen "rebel" players who were dismissed in 2004 due to a dispute with the Zimbabwean Cricket Board.

Brent was a surprise call-up during the 2006 ICC Champions Trophy, replacing the injured Terrence Duffin. He played just the one match, but proved useful, taking 1/28 from seven overs, and adding ten with the bat as part of the Zimbabwean total of 130.

In the first ODI against South Africa, Brent equaled his top score with a defiant 59 after his team was reduced to 72–7. He won the man of the match award, after a good bowling performance as well.

Brent was also selected for the tour to Bangladesh, starting in late November 2007.

Having spent two seasons as a cricket professional at Rugby School in Warwickshire, Brent returned to his native Zimbabwe in September 2010 to take up a coaching job for one of the country's regional youth teams.

Brent is now coaching cricket at the York Cricket Academy in York. In March 2022, he was named head coach of the Zimbabwe women's team.
