= Australian cricket team in South Africa in 1993–94 =

International cricket tour

| | South Africa | Australia |
- Dates: 10 February 1994 – 8 April 1994
| Captains | KC Wessels | AR Border |

Test series
- Result: 3-match series drawn 1–1
| Most runs | AC Hudson (293) | DC Boon (277) |
| Most wickets | CR Matthews (13) | SK Warne (15) |
- Player of the series: SR Waugh (Australia)

One Day International series
- Results: 8-match series drawn 4–4
| Most runs | WJ Cronje (380) | SR Waugh (291) |
| Most wickets | CR Matthews (17) | SK Warne (11) |
- Player of the series: SR Waugh (Australia)

The Australia national cricket team toured South Africa from February to April 1994 and played a three-match Test series against the South Africa national cricket team. The tour was Australia's first to South Africa since the end of the apartheid regime which had led to a sporting boycott of the country. Australia's most recent tour to South Africa had taken place in 1969–70 and a planned tour of the country in 1971–72 had been cancelled after the International Cricket Conference had imposed a moratorium on tours in 1970 and following the player withdrawals and protests which accompanied the tour of Australia by the South African rugby union team during 1971. The Australian Cricket Board postponed their proposed tour of Sri Lanka in order to schedule the series, paying A$50,000 compensation to the Board of Control for Cricket in Sri Lanka.

The tour, which was described as "momentous in many senses" and "a big success on and off the field", immediately followed a tour of Australia by South Africa, an unusual occurrence which Wisden called into question. A total of 170,000 spectators watched the Test matches whilst 157,000 people attended the ODIs.

The teams were considered evenly matched with "two top quality pace attacks, high standards of fielding, and a level of on-field hostility" between them. After three warm-up matches, the tour began with four One Day Internationals (ODI) played between 19 and 24 February before the first Test began on 4 March. The Test matches were played throughout March before another four ODIs were played between 2 and 8 April. Both series were halved; the Test series was drawn 1–1, mirroring the result in the preceding tour of Australia, and the eight-match ODI series was drawn 4–4.

The first Test match of the series saw two incidents where Australian players were fined 10% of their match fee for verbal abuse of opponents and was the first in which a TV umpire was used to rule on all line decisions, although communication difficulties and a lack of cameras created problems with the implementation of this innovation.

== Tour party ==
The Australian team was captained by Allan Border. It included the uncapped Matthew Hayden who made his Test debut in the first Test of the series. At the end of the series, Border, having achieved his ambition of captaining Australia in South Africa, retired from international cricket aged 38. Dean Jones, who did not play in any of the Test matches on the tour, also retired from international cricket at the end of the series. Bowler Damien Fleming was included for the ODI portions of the tour only, with Merv Hughes not considered for these matches.

- Allan Border (captain)
- David Boon
- Damien Fleming (ODIs only)
- Matthew Hayden
- Ian Healy
- Merv Hughes (first-class matches only)
- Dean Jones
- Tim May
- Craig McDermott
- Glenn McGrath
- Paul Reiffel
- Michael Slater
- Mark Taylor
- Shane Warne
- Mark Waugh
- Steve Waugh

The South African team was captained by Kepler Wessels who had recovered from an injury sustained during the tour of Australia. Wessels was named as one of the five Wisden Cricketers of the Year in 1995.

== Test series ==
The three Test series was played between 4 and 29 March. Australian Steve Waugh was named the player of the series.

=== First Test ===
The first Test was held at Wanderers Stadium in Johannesburg. Australian batsman Matthew Hayden made his Test debut, deputising for Mark Taylor who was taken ill on the morning of the match. South Africa won the toss and chose to bat first on a "cracked" pitch that the Australian team thought would deteriorate and favour spin bowling towards the end of the match. After recovering from 126/6, the hosts scored a "respectable" 251 in their first innings. Australia were bowled out for 248 runs in their first innings to leave the match balanced, only South Africa's Jonty Rhodes scoring a half-century in either first innings.

The South African second innings saw Andrew Hudson, Peter Kirsten and Kepler Wessels all make half-centuries and Hansie Cronje score 122 runs, his second career Test century. They declared after scoring a total of 450/9, leaving Australia with a world-record target of 458 runs to win the match with 133 overs remaining. Hayden's thumb was broken by South African fast bowler Allan Donald and the Australians were bowled out for a total of 256 runs, despite a last wicket stand which lasted an hour with the threat of rain looming. (Note: Rain would have halted play. If it had lasted for the remainder of the match or if the ground was too wet to allow play, the match would have ended as a draw.)

The match included several instances of verbal abuse of South African batsmen by Australian bowlers. Fast bowler Merv Hughes was reported to the match referee Donald Carr for continued abuse of a number of batsmen and was fined 10% of his match fee by Carr. Hughes responded to taunts by South African spectators by "lunging at the offenders with his bat" in the uncovered player's tunnel and later received a suspended fine of A$4,000 from the Australian Cricket Board (ACB). Spin bowler Shane Warne confronted Andrew Hudson after taking his wicket in South Africa's second innings and had to be restrained by wicket-keeper Ian Healy. The incident was described as "disgraceful" and "almost unprecedented". Writing in Wisden, Jack Bannister was of the opinion that a "worse example of misbehaviour it would be difficult to imagine" and that "rarely on a cricket field has physical violence seemed so close". Warne was fined 10% of his match fee and fined A$4,000 by the ACB. Border also clashed with South African bowler Brian McMillan during the match and afterwards Brian McMillan entered the Australian dressing room and jokingly asked for Border with a pistol in his hand.

| 4–8 March 1994 | South Africa | v | Australia | South Africa won by 197 runs |
| Scorecard; Wisden report | 251 (80.2 overs); JN Rhodes 69 (126 balls); MG Hughes 3/59 (20 overs) | | 248 (67.3 overs); SR Waugh 45 (82 balls); AA Donald 3/86 (19 overs) | Wanderers Stadium, Johannesburg; Umpires: SB Lambson and DR Shepherd; Player of the match: WJ Cronje |
| Scorecard; Wisden report | 450/9 declared (159.5 overs); WJ Cronje 122 (192 balls); SK Warne 4/86 (44.5 overs) | | 256 (96.3 overs); DC Boon 83 (178 balls); BM McMillan 3/61 (19 overs) | Wanderers Stadium, Johannesburg; Umpires: SB Lambson and DR Shepherd; Player of the match: WJ Cronje |
South Africa won the toss and chose to bat first; ML Hayden made his Test match debut

=== Second Test ===
The second Test was played on a slow pitch with low bounce at Newlands Cricket Ground in Cape Town. South Africa chose to bat first and scored 361 in their first innings, with opener Andrew Hudson scoring 102 runs, his second Test match century. In reply Australia made 435 in 11 1/2 hours; a first innings lead of 74 on a slow scoring pitch that looked like it would lead to a draw.

The match was changed on the evening of the fourth day when South Africa lost four wickets for three runs, including the run out of captain Kepler Wessels which was referred to the third umpire for review using television footage. Steve Waugh was influential in the South African collapse, taking the wicket of Hansie Cronje caught and bowled before taking Hudson's wicket. Waugh finished the innings with five wickets for 25 runs, his best bowling in Test cricket and his third five-wicket haul in Test matches. South Africa were all out for 164 on the final morning, leaving a target of 91 for Australia to make which they achieved before tea on the final day.

| 17–21 March 1994 | South Africa | v | Australia | Australia won by nine wickets |
| Scorecard; Wisden report | 361 (144.1 overs); AC Hudson 102 (174 balls); GD McGrath 3/65 (26.1 overs) | | 435 (159.4 overs); DC Boon 96 (257 balls); CR Matthews 5/80 (36 overs) | Newlands Cricket Ground, Cape Town; Umpires: KE Liebenberg and DR Shepherd; Player of the match: SR Waugh |
| Scorecard; Wisden report | 164 (90.3 overs); AC Hudson 49 (156 balls); SR Waugh 5/28 (22.3 overs) | | 92/1 (25.1 overs); MJ Slater 43 (85 balls); AA Donald 1/20 (5 overs) | Newlands Cricket Ground, Cape Town; Umpires: KE Liebenberg and DR Shepherd; Player of the match: SR Waugh |
South Africa won the toss and chose to bat first

=== Third Test ===
The third Test, at Kingsmead Cricket Ground in Durban, ended in a draw to leave the series tied at 1–1. South Africa chose to bowl first on a pitch described as "hard and grassy" which was expected to favour the South African fast bowling attack. After bowling Australia out for 269 the South Africans scored 422 in their first innings, but took almost 14 hours to do so. Wisden called the tactics of batting so slowly "baffling" and the time taken to compile their total meant that South Africa were unable to bowl Australia out again, the tourists finishing the match on 297/4 with Mark Waugh on 113 not out after Michael Slater had scored 95 runs. The final partnership of Waugh and Australian captain Allan Border, playing in his final Test match, lasted for more than three hours to save the game.

| 25–29 March 1994 | Australia | v | South Africa | Match drawn |
| Scorecard; Wisden report | 269 (101.2 overs); SR Waugh 64 (150 balls); CR Matthews 4/65 (29 overs) | | 422 (205.2 overs); BM McMillan 84 (223 balls); SK Warne 4/92 (55 overs) | Kingsmead Cricket Ground, Durban; Umpires: Mahboob Shah and CJ Mitchley; Player of the match: ME Waugh |
| Scorecard; Wisden report | 297/4 (124 overs); ME Waugh 113* (222 balls); AA Donald 3/66 (28 overs) | | | Kingsmead Cricket Ground, Durban; Umpires: Mahboob Shah and CJ Mitchley; Player of the match: ME Waugh |
South Africa won the toss and chose to bowl first; Allan Border played his final test match.

== One Day International series ==
A total of eight One Day Internationals were played during the tour, four before the Test series and four after it. The series was tied at four wins for each team. The matches which were played over 50 overs. Australia's Steve Waugh was named player of the series, repeating his success of the Test series.

=== Pre-Test series matches ===
The first set of four ODIs were played between 19 and 24 February. South Africa won the first match by five runs after the penultimate over, bowled by Fanie de Villiers, restricted the Australians to just one run from it with the loss of Allan Border's wicket. The over, made up of six yorkers, was described by Wisden as "one of the best-ever penultimate overs in a one day international". An innings of 97 by Hansie Cronje and one described as "violent, even by his standards" by Adrian Kuiper who added 47 runs in 22 balls, led South Africa to an easy win in the second match of the series the following day.

Australia won the third match before being bowled out for 154 in the last match before the Test series began and losing by seven wickets in another easy South African victory.

| 19 February 1994 | South Africa; 232/3 (50 overs) | v | Australia; 227/5 (50 overs) | South Africa won by 5 runs |
| Scorecard; Wisden report | South Africa; 232/3 (50 overs) | v | Australia; 227/5 (50 overs) | Wanderers Stadium, Johannesburg; Umpires: SB Lambson and CJ Mitchley; Player of the match: WJ Cronje (South Africa) |
| Scorecard; Wisden report | WJ Cronje 112 (120 balls); GD McGrath 1/29 (10 overs) | | DC Boon 58 (81 balls); EO Simons 2/29 (10 overs) | Wanderers Stadium, Johannesburg; Umpires: SB Lambson and CJ Mitchley; Player of the match: WJ Cronje (South Africa) |
| South Africa won the toss and chose to bat | | | | Wanderers Stadium, Johannesburg; Umpires: SB Lambson and CJ Mitchley; Player of the match: WJ Cronje (South Africa) |

| 20 February 1994 | South Africa; 265/5 (50 overs) | v | Australia; 209 (42.4 overs) | South Africa won by 56 runs |
| Scorecard; Wisden report | South Africa; 265/5 (50 overs) | v | Australia; 209 (42.4 overs) | Centurion Park, Verwoerdburg; Umpires: WA Diedricks and KE Liebenberg; Player of the match: WJ Cronje (South Africa) |
| Scorecard; Wisden report | WJ Cronje 97 (101 balls); GD McGrath 2/42 (10 overs) | | SR Waugh 86 (91 balls); CR Matthews 3/26 (8 overs) | Centurion Park, Verwoerdburg; Umpires: WA Diedricks and KE Liebenberg; Player of the match: WJ Cronje (South Africa) |
| South Africa won the toss and chose to bat | | | | Centurion Park, Verwoerdburg; Umpires: WA Diedricks and KE Liebenberg; Player of the match: WJ Cronje (South Africa) |

| 22 February 1994 | Australia; 281/6 (50 overs) | v | South Africa; 193 (43 overs) | Australia won by 88 runs |
| Scorecard; Wisden report | Australia; 281/6 (50 overs) | v | South Africa; 193 (43 overs) | St George's Park Cricket Ground, Port Elizabeth; Umpires: RE Koertzen and CJ Mitchley; Player of the match: ME Waugh (Australia) |
| Scorecard; Wisden report | DC Boon 76 (105 balls); PC de Villiers 2/55 (10 overs) | | WJ Cronje 45 (58 balls); SK Warne 4/36 (10 overs) | St George's Park Cricket Ground, Port Elizabeth; Umpires: RE Koertzen and CJ Mitchley; Player of the match: ME Waugh (Australia) |
| Australia won the toss and chose to bat | | | | St George's Park Cricket Ground, Port Elizabeth; Umpires: RE Koertzen and CJ Mitchley; Player of the match: ME Waugh (Australia) |

| 24 February 1994 | South Africa; 154 (43.2 overs) | v | Australia; 157/3 (45 overs) | South Africa won by 7 wickets with 30 balls remaining |
| Scorecard; Wisden report | South Africa; 154 (43.2 overs) | v | Australia; 157/3 (45 overs) | Kingsmead Cricket Ground, Durban; Umpires: WA Diedricks and KE Liebenberg; Player of the match: CR Matthews (South Africa) |
| Scorecard; Wisden report | AR Border 69* (84 balls); CR Matthews 4/10 (8 overs) | | WJ Cronje 50* (78 balls); PR Reiffel 2/31 (10 overs) | Kingsmead Cricket Ground, Durban; Umpires: WA Diedricks and KE Liebenberg; Player of the match: CR Matthews (South Africa) |
| Australia won the toss and chose to bat | | | | Kingsmead Cricket Ground, Durban; Umpires: WA Diedricks and KE Liebenberg; Player of the match: CR Matthews (South Africa) |

=== Post-Test series matches ===
The second set of ODIs was played as day/night matches under floodlit conditions. South African fast bowler Allan Donald was rested for the remaining matches after playing in each of the Test matches. Australia won the first of the second set of matches, reading a slow, turning pitch more effectively than the South African team and selecting two specialist spin bowlers whilst their opponents retained a bowling attack made up solely of fast bowlers.

In the sixth match a floodlight failure during the Australian innings meant that they had to bat with a reduced level of light after South Africa had made 227/6. After losing their first seven wickets for 77 runs, bowlers Paul Reiffel and Shane Warne both scored half centuries for Australia and came close to winning the match for their team, a close run out of Warne towards the end of the Australian innings clinching the match for South Africa. The partnership of 118 between the two players set a new record for the eighth wicket in an ODI.

The series was poised at 4–2 in South Africa's favour after the match, but Australia won both the remaining fixtures to level the series. Despite a poor start in the seventh match, Mark Taylor and Mark Waugh put on 123 for the Australian's third wicket and South Africa fell behind the run rate to lose the match. The final match came down to the final over. Australia had scored 203/6 and, with 41 overs bowled, South Africa required just 46 runs from the remaining overs. Six were required from the final over, bowled by Damien Fleming who was playing his first match of the tour; South Africa scored just four, with a run out off the final ball of the series meaning that Australia won the match by one run, levelling the ODI series at 4–4 with an "improbable victory".

| 2 April 1994 | South Africa; 158 (49.5 overs) | v | Australia; 159/3 (40 overs) | Australia won by 7 wickets with 60 balls remaining |
| Scorecard; Wisden report | South Africa; 158 (49.5 overs) | v | Australia; 159/3 (40 overs) | Buffalo Park, East London; Umpires: RE Koertzen and KE Liebenberg; Player of the match: AR Border (Australia) |
| Scorecard; Wisden report | PN Kirsten 53 (105 balls); AR Border 3/27 (10 overs) | | SR Waugh 67 (60 balls); EO Simons 2/32 (10 overs) | Buffalo Park, East London; Umpires: RE Koertzen and KE Liebenberg; Player of the match: AR Border (Australia) |
| South Africa won the toss and chose to bat | | | | Buffalo Park, East London; Umpires: RE Koertzen and KE Liebenberg; Player of the match: AR Border (Australia) |

| 4 April 1994 | South Africa; 227/6 (50 overs) | v | Australia; 201 (49.1 overs) | South Africa won by 26 runs |
| Scorecard; Wisden report | South Africa; 227/6 (50 overs) | v | Australia; 201 (49.1 overs) | St George's Park Cricket Ground, Port Elizabeth; Umpires: WA Diedricks and SB Lambson; Player of the match: JN Rhodes (South Africa) |
| Scorecard; Wisden report | JN Rhodes 66 (90 balls); PR Reiffel 2/33 (10 overs) | | PR Reiffel 58 (68 balls); TG Shaw 2/19 (8 overs) | St George's Park Cricket Ground, Port Elizabeth; Umpires: WA Diedricks and SB Lambson; Player of the match: JN Rhodes (South Africa) |
| South Africa won the toss and chose to bat | | | | St George's Park Cricket Ground, Port Elizabeth; Umpires: WA Diedricks and SB Lambson; Player of the match: JN Rhodes (South Africa) |

| 6 April 1994 | Australia; 242/6 (50 overs) | v | South Africa; 206/5 (50 overs) | Australia won by 36 runs |
| Scorecard; Wisden report | Australia; 242/6 (50 overs) | v | South Africa; 206/5 (50 overs) | Newlands Cricket Ground, Cape Town; Umpires: RE Koertzen and CJ Mitchley; Player of the match: ME Waugh (Australia) |
| Scorecard; Wisden report | ME Waugh 71 (99 balls); CR Matthews 4/47 (10 overs) | | AC Hudson 62 (92 balls); SK Warne 3/31 (10 overs) | Newlands Cricket Ground, Cape Town; Umpires: RE Koertzen and CJ Mitchley; Player of the match: ME Waugh (Australia) |
| Australia won the toss and chose to bat | | | | Newlands Cricket Ground, Cape Town; Umpires: RE Koertzen and CJ Mitchley; Player of the match: ME Waugh (Australia) |

| 8 April 1994 | Australia; 203/6 (50 overs) | v | South Africa; 202/8 (50 overs) | Australia won by 1 run |
| Scorecard; Wisden report | Australia; 203/6 (50 overs) | v | South Africa; 202/8 (50 overs) | Springbok Park, Bloemfontein; Umpires: SB Lambson and CJ Mitchley; Player of the match: AC Hudson (South Africa) |
| Scorecard; Wisden report | DC Boon 45 (79 balls); CR Matthews 3/40 (10 overs) | | AC Hudson 84 (132 balls); PR Reiffel 2/34 (10 overs) | Springbok Park, Bloemfontein; Umpires: SB Lambson and CJ Mitchley; Player of the match: AC Hudson (South Africa) |
| South Africa won the toss and chose to bat; Allan Border played his final ODI match. | | | | Springbok Park, Bloemfontein; Umpires: SB Lambson and CJ Mitchley; Player of the match: AC Hudson (South Africa) |

== Other matches ==
As well as the internationals, three first-class matches and two other matches were played during the tour. The tour began with a friendly one-day match against NF Oppenheimer's XI, followed by a first-class match against Northern Transvaal and a one-day match against a representative team. Before the first Test match Australia played a first-class match against Orange Free State and between the first and second Tests they played Boland.

| 10 February 1994 | Australia; 223 (55.5 overs) | v | NF Oppenheimer's XI; 121/4 (29 overs) | Match drawn |
| Scorecard (subscription required) | Australia; 223 (55.5 overs) | v | NF Oppenheimer's XI; 121/4 (29 overs) | NF Oppenheimer Ground, Randjesfontein; Umpires: DF Becker and MK van Nierop |
| Scorecard (subscription required) | DM Jones 60 (101 balls); EAE Baptiste 4/56 (14 overs) | | AP Kuiper 56 (53 balls); MG Hughes 1/19 (5 overs) | NF Oppenheimer Ground, Randjesfontein; Umpires: DF Becker and MK van Nierop |
| No toss; Friendly match. | | | | NF Oppenheimer Ground, Randjesfontein; Umpires: DF Becker and MK van Nierop |

| 12–14 February 1994 | Australians (Australia) | v | Northern Transvaal | Australians won by 249 runs |
| Scorecard (subscription required) | 363 (94.2 overs); DM Jones 85 (117 balls); S Elworthy 4/85 (25 overs) | | 209 (67.1 overs); DJ van Zyl 63* (102 balls); PR Reiffel 4/27 (12.1 overs) | Centurion Park, Verwoerdburg; Umpires: SB Lambson and KE Liebenberg |
| Scorecard (subscription required) | 281/4 declared (62 overs); ME Waugh 134 (140 balls); DJ van Zyl 2/83 (21 overs) | | 166 (42 overs); RF Pienaar 42 (47 balls); PR Reiffel 4/57 (11 overs) | Centurion Park, Verwoerdburg; Umpires: SB Lambson and KE Liebenberg |
Northern Transvaal won the toss and chose to bowl first; First-class match. The match was scheduled to last four days but was completed in three.

| 17 February 1994 | Australians (Australia); 142/5 (35 overs) | v | South African Board President's XI | No result |
| Scorecard (subscription required) | Australians (Australia); 142/5 (35 overs) | v | South African Board President's XI | Witrand Cricket Field, Potchefstroom; Umpires: RE Koertzen and CJ Mitchley |
| Scorecard (subscription required) | ME Waugh 55 (51 balls); S Abrahams 2/37 (8 overs) | | | Witrand Cricket Field, Potchefstroom; Umpires: RE Koertzen and CJ Mitchley |
| South African Board President's XI won the toss and chose to bowl; Rain stopped play at 12:16 after 35 overs in the Australian innings. The match was abandoned at 13:00.; 50 over List A match. | | | | Witrand Cricket Field, Potchefstroom; Umpires: RE Koertzen and CJ Mitchley |

| 26 February–1 March 1994 | Australians (Australia) | v | Orange Free State | Australians won the match by 60 runs |
| Scorecard (subscription required) | 450/8 declared (117.3 overs); ME Waugh 154 (162 balls); BT Player 4/107 (28.3 overs) | | 264 (86.1 overs); LJ Wilkinson 53 (92 balls); TBA May 5/98 (35.1 overs) | Springbok Park, Bloemfontein; Umpires: RA Noble and DL Orchard |
| Scorecard (subscription required) | 270/6 declared (75 overs); MJ Slater 105 (150 balls); JF Venter 5/101 (26 overs) | | 396 (108.2 overs); WJ Cronje 251 (306 balls); MG Hughes 4/127 (25 overs) | Springbok Park, Bloemfontein; Umpires: RA Noble and DL Orchard |
Australians won the toss and chose to bat first; Four day first-class match.

| 12–14 March 1994 | Australians (Australia) | v | Boland | Match drawn |
| Scorecard | 254/7 declared (77 overs); DM Jones 63 (114 balls); BJ Drew 3/68 (16 overs) | | 155 (69.5 overs); JS Roos 40 (104 balls); GD McGrath 4/38 (18 overs) | Stellenbosch University Ground No. 1, Stellenbosch; Umpires: WA Diedricks and SF Marais |
| Scorecard | 228/6 declared (69 overs); MA Taylor 74; CW Henderson 3/73 (20 overs) | | 132/5 (58 overs); TN Lazard 44; PR Reiffel 2/23 (12 overs) | Stellenbosch University Ground No. 1, Stellenbosch; Umpires: WA Diedricks and SF Marais |
Boland won the toss and chose to bowl first; Three day first-class match. RI Dalrymple was a full Boland substitute for WS Truter on the first day of the match after Truter "aggravated an injury".
