= English cricket team in South Africa in 1995–96 =

International cricket tour

England in South Africa in 1995–96
	England	South Africa
- Dates: 24 October 1995 – 21 January 1996
Captains	Michael Atherton	Hansie Cronje

Test series
- Result: South Africa won the 5-match series 1–0
Most runs	Michael Atherton (390)	Daryll Cullinan (307)
Most wickets	Dominic Cork (19)	Allan Donald (19)
- Player of the series: Allan Donald (SA)

One Day International series
- Results: South Africa won the 7-match series 6–1
Most runs	Graham Thorpe (233)	Hansie Cronje (248)
Most wickets	Darren Gough (11)	Shaun Pollock (13)
- Player of the series: Shaun Pollock (SA)

The England cricket team toured South Africa from 24 October 1995 to 21 January 1996 for a five-match Test series and a seven-match One Day International (ODI) series against the South African national team. After four consecutive draws, South Africa won the fifth Test to win the series 1–0, before winning the ODI series 6–1, losing only the second ODI.

== Squads ==
Tests		ODIs	
South Africa	England	South Africa	England
Hansie Cronje (c); Paul Adams; Nicky Boje; Darryl Cullinan; Allan Donald; Clive Eksteen; Andrew Hudson; Jacques Kallis; Gary Kirsten; Brian McMillan; Craig Matthews; Shaun Pollock; Jonty Rhodes; Dave Richardson (wk); Brett Schultz	Michael Atherton (c); Alec Stewart (wk); Dominic Cork; John Crawley; Angus Fraser; Darren Gough; Graeme Hick; Richard Illingworth; Mark Ilott; Devon Malcolm; Peter Martin; Mark Ramprakash; Jack Russell (wk); Robin Smith; Graham Thorpe; Mike Watkinson	Hansie Cronje (c); Paul Adams; Nicky Boje; Darryl Cullinan; Allan Donald; Clive Eksteen; Andrew Hudson; Jacques Kallis; Gary Kirsten; Brian McMillan; Craig Matthews; Shaun Pollock; Jonty Rhodes; Dave Richardson (wk); Brett Schultz	Michael Atherton (c); Alec Stewart (wk); Dominic Cork; John Crawley; Neil Fairbrother; Angus Fraser; Darren Gough; Graeme Hick; Richard Illingworth; Mark Ilott; Devon Malcolm; Peter Martin; Mark Ramprakash; Dermot Reeve; Jack Russell (wk); Neil Smith; Robin Smith; Graham Thorpe; Mike Watkinson

== Tour matches ==
=== Nicky Oppenheimer XI vs England XI ===
24 October 1995
Scorecard

England XI	v	Nicky Oppenheimer XI
242/5d (60.2 overs); Alec Stewart 74 (121); Henry Williams 2/48 (12 overs)		130 (36 overs); Geoffrey Toyana 28 (47)

England XI won by 112 runs
NF Oppenheimer Ground, Randjesfontein
Umpires: Ronald Ryninks (SA) and Frank Wood (SA)

- England XI won the toss and elected to bat.

=== 50-over: Easterns vs England XI ===
25 October 1995
Scorecard

Easterns; 261/5 (50 overs)	v	England XI; 264/5 (49 overs)
Wayne Radford 92 (118); Darren Gough 1/45 (10 overs)		Mark Ramprakash 89* (93); Corrie Jordaan 2/34 (10 overs)

England XI won by 5 wickets
PAM Brink Stadium, Springs
Umpires: Barry Lambson (SA) and Cyril Mitchley (SA)
Player of the match: Mark Ramprakash (England XI)

- Easterns won the toss and elected to bat.

=== First-class: South African Invitational XI vs England XI ===
27–30 September 1995
Scorecard

England XI	v	South African Invitational XI
332 (131.4 overs); Alec Stewart 94; Mark Davis 4/68 (21.4 overs)		210 (78.1 overs); Hansie Cronje 56; Richard Illingworth 6/76 (25.1 overs)
282/5d (80 overs); Alec Stewart 101*; Henry Williams 2/77 (22 overs)		25/1 (14 overs); Mickey Arthur 12; Mike Watkinson 1/4 (3 overs)

Match drawn
Soweto Cricket Oval, Soweto
Umpires: Muhammad Bagus (SA) and Wilf Diedricks (SA)

- England XI won the toss and elected to bat.
- No play was possible on day 4.

=== First-class: Border vs England XI ===
2–5 November 1995
Scorecard

England XI	v	Border
351 (133.1 overs); John Crawley 108; Brenden Fourie 4/75 (30 overs)		166 (58.3 overs); Peter Kirsten 53; Dominic Cork 5/48 (16.3 overs)
		132 (51.5 overs); Daryll Cullinan 55; Mark Ilott 5/36 (13.5 overs)

England XI won by an innings and 53 runs
Buffalo Park, East London
Umpires: Robert Noble (SA) and Dave Orchard (SA)

- England XI won the toss and elected to bat.
- No play was possible on Day 2.

=== First-class: South Africa A vs England XI ===
9–12 November 1995
Scorecard

South Africa A	v	England XI
470/9d (142 overs); Adam Bacher 116; Darren Gough 3/85 (29 overs)		308 (106.3 overs); Jack Russell 93*; Paul Adams 4/65 (28.3 overs)
148/4 (38.5 overs); John Commins 54; Angus Fraser 3/49 (15 overs)		309 (113.4 overs); Alec Stewart 56; Paul Adams 5/116 (38.4 overs)

South Africa A won by 6 wickets
De Beers Diamond Oval, Kimberley
Umpires: Rudi Koertzen (SA) and Dave Orchard (SA)

- South Africa A won the toss and elected to bat.

=== First-class: Free State vs England XI ===
23–25 November 1995
Scorecard

England XI	v	Free State
316/4d (97.5 overs); Graham Thorpe 131* (262); Herman Bakkes 1/42 (16 overs)		245/9d (72 overs); Deon Jordaan 52; Richard Illingworth 3/50 (19 overs)
239/4d (85 overs); John Crawley 90; Chris Craven 2/25 (13 overs)		110/3 (39 overs); Chris Craven 60*; Mark Ramprakash 1/7 (3 overs)

Match drawn
Goodyear Park, Bloemfontein
Umpires: Barry Lambson (SA) and Cyril Mitchley (SA)

- England XI won the toss and elected to bat.

=== 50-over: Free State vs England XI ===
26 November 1995
Scorecard

Free State; 201/8 (50 overs)	v	England XI; 202/3 (41 overs)
Deon Jordaan 54; Mike Watkinson 3/40 (10 overs)		Alec Stewart 81; Chris Craven 2/36 (7 overs)

England XI won by 7 wickets
Goodyear Park, Bloemfontein
Umpires: Barry Lambson (SA) and Cyril Mitchley (SA)

- Free State won the toss and elected to bat.

=== First-class: Boland vs England XI ===
7–9 December 1995
Scorecard

England XI	v	Boland
402/8d (152.5 overs); Jack Russell 129*; Billy Stelling 2/47 (19 overs)		288 (135 overs); Phil DeFreitas 54; Mark Ilott 3/48 (22 overs)
33/2 (12.3 overs); John Crawley 18*; Charl Willoughby 1/7 (6 overs)

Match drawn
Boland Bank Park, Paarl
Umpires: Muhammad Bagus (SA) and Robert Brooks (SA)

- England XI won the toss and elected to bat.

=== 50-over: Boland vs England XI ===
10 December 1995
Scorecard

England XI; 244 (49.4 overs)	v	Boland; 170 (42.4 overs)
Michael Atherton 77; Adrian Kuiper 2/16 (6 overs)		Adrian Kuiper 54; Peter Martin 4/35 (8.4 overs)

England XI won by 74 runs
Boland Bank Park, Paarl
Umpires: Muhammad Bagus (SA) and Robert Brooks (SA)

- England XI won the toss and elected to bat.

=== First-class: South African Students XI vs England XI ===
20–22 December 1995
Scorecard

South African Students XI	v	England XI
269/8d (86.1 overs); Nic Pothas 147; Mark Ilott 6/89 (24 overs)		186/2 (78 overs); Alec Stewart 89*; James Albanie 1/32 (9 overs)

Match drawn
Jan Smuts Stadium, Pietermaritzburg
Umpires: Sarel Marais (SA) and Ramesh Shah (SA)

- South African Students XI won the toss and elected to bat.
- No play was possible on day 3.

=== 50-over: Western Province vs England XI ===
6 January 1996
Scorecard

England XI; 196 (49.5 overs)	v	Western Province; 200/7 (49 overs)
Neil Fairbrother 46; Craig White 46; Meyrick Pringle 4/34 (10 overs)		Faiek Davids 55*; Mike Watkinson 2/23 (5 overs)

Western Province won by 3 wickets
Newlands Cricket Ground, Cape Town
Umpires: Muhammad Bagus (SA) and Robert Brooks (SA)

- England XI won the toss and elected to bat.

== Test series ==
=== 1st Test ===
16–20 November 1995
Scorecard

England	v	South Africa
381/9d (143 overs); Graeme Hick 141 (277); Brian McMillan 3/50 (25 overs)

Match drawn
Centurion Park, Centurion
Umpires: Cyril Mitchley (SA) and S Venkataraghavan (Ind)
Player of the match: Graeme Hick (Eng)

- South Africa won the toss and elected to field.
- Rain prevented any play from tea on day 2 to the end of day 5.
- Shaun Pollock (SA) made his Test debut.

=== 2nd Test ===
30 November – 4 December 1995
Scorecard

South Africa	v	England
332 (104 overs); Gary Kirsten 110 (241); Dominic Cork 5/84 (32 overs)		200 (68.3 overs); Robin Smith 52 (109); Clive Eksteen 3/12 (11 overs)
346/9d (104.3 overs); Brian McMillan 100* (168); Dominic Cork 4/78 (31.3 overs)		351/5 (165 overs); Michael Atherton 185* (492); Brian McMillan 2/50 (21 overs)

Match drawn
New Wanderers Stadium, Johannesburg
Umpires: Darrell Hair (Aus) and Karl Liebenberg (SA)
Player of the match: Michael Atherton and Jack Russell (both Eng)

- England won the toss and elected to field.
- Jack Russell (Eng) took a Test record 11 catches in the match.
- Michael Atherton (Eng) set a Test record for the highest innings at the New Wanderers Stadium.

=== 3rd Test ===
14–18 December 1995
Scorecard

South Africa	v	England
225 (100 overs); Andrew Hudson 45 (63); Peter Martin 4/60 (27 overs)		152/5 (48.1 overs); Alec Stewart 41 (85); Craig Matthews 3/31 (12 overs)

Match drawn
Kingsmead Cricket Ground, Durban
Umpires: Steve Bucknor (WI) and Dave Orchard (SA)
Player of the match: Allan Donald (SA)

- South Africa won the toss and elected to bat.
- Bad light stopped play in the evening sessions of days 1 and 2.
- Rain reduced play on day 3 and prevented play on days 4 and 5.
- Jacques Kallis (SA) made his Test debut.

=== 4th Test ===
26–30 December 1995
Scorecard

South Africa	v	England
428 (159.5 overs); Daryll Cullinan 91 (183); Dominic Cork 4/113 (43.2 overs)		263 (120.4 overs); Michael Atherton 72 (237); Allan Donald 3/49 (25.4 overs)
162/9d (65.3 overs); Gary Kirsten 69 (176); Peter Martin 3/39 (17 overs)		189/3 (92 overs); Alec Stewart 81 (261); Craig Matthews 1/29 (19 overs)

Match drawn
St George's Oval, Port Elizabeth
Umpires: Steve Bucknor (WI) and Cyril Mitchley (SA)
Player of the match: Gary Kirsten (SA)

- South Africa won the toss and elected to bat.
- Paul Adams (SA) made his Test debut.

=== 5th Test ===
2–4 January 1996
Scorecard

England	v	South Africa
153 (68.1 overs); Robin Smith 66 (179); Allan Donald 5/46 (16 overs)		244 (101 overs); Daryll Cullinan 62 (134); Peter Martin 3/37 (24 overs)
157 (62.5 overs); Graham Thorpe 59 (126); Shaun Pollock 5/32 (15.5 overs)		70/0 (15.4 overs); Gary Kirsten 41* (48)

South Africa won by 10 wickets
Newlands Cricket Ground, Cape Town
Umpires: Dave Orchard (SA) and Steve Randell (Aus)
Player of the match: Allan Donald (SA)

- England won the toss and elected to bat.

== ODI series ==
=== 1st ODI ===
9 January 1996 (D/N)
Scorecard

South Africa; 211/8 (50 overs)	v	England; 205 (49.5 overs)
Shaun Pollock 66* (66); Craig White 2/31 (10 overs)		Graham Thorpe 62 (96); Shaun Pollock 4/34 (9.5 overs)

South Africa won by 6 runs
Newlands Cricket Ground, Cape Town
Umpires: Karl Liebenberg (SA) and Dave Orchard (SA)
Player of the match: Shaun Pollock (SA)

- South Africa won the toss and elected to bat.
- Neil Smith (Eng), Paul Adams, Jacques Kallis and Shaun Pollock (all SA) made their ODI debuts.

=== 2nd ODI ===
11 January 1996 (D/N)
Scorecard

South Africa; 262/8 (50 overs)	v	England; 265/5 (48.2 overs)
Andrew Hudson 64 (97); Dominic Cork 3/44 (10 overs)		Michael Atherton 85 (110); Shaun Pollock 2/48 (9.2 overs)

England won by 5 wickets
Springbok Park, Bloemfontein
Umpires: Wilf Diedricks (SA) and Rudi Koertzen (SA)
Player of the match: Michael Atherton (Eng)

- South Africa won the toss and elected to bat.
- Floodlight failure after 23.4 overs of the England innings meant play was stopped for bad light for 50 minutes, but no overs were lost.

=== 3rd ODI ===
13 January 1996
Scorecard

England; 198/8 (50 overs)	v	South Africa; 199/7 (48.1 overs)
Neil Fairbrother 57* (92); Shaun Pollock 3/31 (10 overs)		Jonty Rhodes 44 (65); Darren Gough 3/31 (10 overs)

South Africa won by 3 wickets
New Wanderers Stadium, Johannesburg
Umpires: Rudi Koertzen (SA) and Dave Orchard (SA)
Player of the match: Shaun Pollock (SA)

- England won the toss and elected to bat.
- Mike Watkinson (Eng) made his ODI debut.

=== 4th ODI ===
14 January 1996
Scorecard

England; 272/8 (50 overs)	v	South Africa; 276/3 (48 overs)
Alec Stewart 64 (78); Allan Donald 3/72 (9 overs)		Gary Kirsten 116 (126); Darren Gough 1/41 (10 overs)

South Africa won by 7 wickets
Centurion Park, Centurion
Umpires: Wilf Diedricks (SA) and Karl Liebenberg (SA)
Player of the match: Gary Kirsten (SA)

- England won the toss and elected to bat.

=== 5th ODI ===
17 January 1996 (D/N)
Scorecard

England; 184 (49.5 overs)	v	South Africa; 185/5 (48.2 overs)
Graham Thorpe 63 (74); Allan Donald 4/41 (10 overs)		Hansie Cronje 78 (133); Dominic Cork 2/29 (9.2 overs)

South Africa won by 5 wickets
Kingsmead Cricket Ground, Durban
Umpires: Wilf Diedricks (SA) and Dave Orchard (SA)
Player of the match: Allan Donald (SA)

- South Africa won the toss and elected to field.

=== 6th ODI ===
19 January 1996 (D/N)
Scorecard

South Africa; 129 (41.4 overs)	v	England; 115 (43.4 overs)
Brian McMillan 45* (92); Darren Gough 3/25 (10 overs)		Graeme Hick 39 (65); Paul Adams 3/26 (9 overs)

South Africa won by 14 runs
Buffalo Park, East London
Umpires: Cyril Mitchley (SA) and Dave Orchard (SA)
Player of the match: Paul Adams (SA)

- South Africa won the toss and elected to bat.
- Lance Klusener (SA) made his ODI debut.

=== 7th ODI ===
21 January 1996
Scorecard

South Africa; 218/9 (50 overs)	v	England; 154 (46.1 overs)
Adrian Kuiper 61* (66); Darren Gough 4/33 (10 overs)		Graeme Hick 43 (64); Fanie de Villiers 4/32 (9.1 overs)

South Africa won by 64 runs
St George's Oval, Port Elizabeth
Umpires: Rudi Koertzen (SA) and Cyril Mitchley (SA)
Player of the match: Adrian Kuiper (SA)

- South Africa won the toss and elected to bat.
- Steve Palframan (SA) made his ODI debut.
