= Indian cricket team in South Africa in 1992–93 =

International cricket tour

India in South Africa 1992-93
	South Africa	India
- Dates: 29 October 1992 – 6 January 1993
Captains	Kepler Wessels	Mohammad Azharuddin

Test series
- Result: South Africa won the 4-match series 1–0
Most runs	Kepler Wessels (295)	Kapil Dev (202)
Most wickets	Allan Donald (20)	Anil Kumble (18)
- Player of the series: Allan Donald (SA)

One Day International series
- Results: South Africa won the 7-match series 5–2
Most runs	Kepler Wessels (342)	Mohammad Azharuddin (232)
Most wickets	Craig Matthews (11)	Manoj Prabhakar (6)
- Player of the series: Kepler Wessels (SA)

The Indian cricket team toured South Africa for four Tests and seven ODIs from 29 October 1992 to 6 January 1993.

South Africa won the Test series 1–0.

South Africa won the ODI series 5–2.

== Tour matches ==
=== Nicky Oppenheimer XI v Indians ===
29 October 1992
Scorecard

Indians; 207/6d (52 overs)	v	Nicky Oppenheimer XI; 127 (41.3 overs)
Sachin Tendulkar 100*; Alan Kourie 4/50 (16 overs)		Herschelle Gibbs 36; Venkatapathy Raju 4/11 (5 overs)

Indians won by 80 runs
Halfway House, Randjesfontein

- No toss

The touring Indians named a 12-member team for the match, leaving out Kiran More, Anil Kumble, Manoj Prabhakar and Javagal Srinath. No toss was held and the Indians were allowed to bat first. After the fall of three early wickets, opener Ajay Jadeja (50) and 19-year-old Sachin Tendulkar (100) put on a 127-run partnership. Tendulkar reached his half-century in 50 deliveries and century in 92, and became the first Indian to score a century on South African soil. Five of the six Indian wickets that fell were claimed by medium-pacer Adrian Kuiper (one) and left-arm spinner Alan Kourie (four). After declaring their innings at 207/6, the Indians claimed two early wickets, which included Jimmy Cook, being dismissed for a duck by Kapil Dev. Venkatapathy Raju picked four wickets including that of Herschelle Gibbs, and helped his team gain victory by 70 runs. Chetan Sharma claimed a hat-trick, picking wickets of Richard Snell, Vintcent van der Bijl and Kourie.

=== Combined Bowl XI v Indians ===
31 October–3 November 1992
Scorecard

Combined Bowl XI	v	Indians
230 (106.4 overs); Mike Cann 94; Chetan Sharma 4/56 (18.4 overs)		556/3d (142 overs); Ajay Jadeja 254*; Henry Williams 1/63 (26 overs)
85 (49 overs); Peter de Vaal 24; Subroto Banerjee 5/29 (19 overs)

Indians won by an innings and 241 runs
PAM Brink Stadium, Springs
Umpires: Karl Liebenberg and Wilf Diedricks

- Combined Bowl XI won the toss and elected to bat.

=== South Africa Board President's XI v Indians ===
6–9 November 1992
Scorecard

South Africa Board President's XI	v	Indians
268 (88.5 overs); Hansie Cronje 73; Manoj Prabhakar 3/38 (17 overs)		164 (54.4 overs); Chetan Sharma 25*; Brett Schultz 5/35 (17 overs)
200 (70.4 overs); Hansie Cronje 53; Javagal Srinath 4/49 (18 overs)		9/0 (6 overs); Ravi Shastri 6* Tertius Bosch 0/0 (1 over)

Match drawn
Centurion Park, Centurion
Umpires: Cyril Mitchley and Wilf Diedricks

- South Africa Board President's XI won the toss and elected to bat.

== Test matches ==
=== 1st Test ===
13–17 November 1992
Scorecard

South Africa	v	India
254 (103.4 overs); Kepler Wessels 118 (266); Kapil Dev 3/43 (22 overs)		277 (134 overs); Pravin Amre 103 (299); Brian McMillan 3/52 (37 overs)
176/3 (82 overs); Andrew Hudson 55 (171); Javagal Srinath 2/42 (16 overs)

Match drawn
Kingsmead, Durban
Umpires: Steve Bucknor (WI), Karl Liebenberg (SA)
Player of the match: Pravin Amre (Ind)

- India won the toss and decided to field.
- Pravin Amre and Ajay Jadeja (Ind), and Jimmy Cook, Omar Henry, Brian McMillan, Jonty Rhodes and Brett Schultz (SA) made their Test debuts.
- Kepler Wessels (SA) became the first batsman to score centuries for two countries.
- Sachin Tendulkar (Ind) became the first batsman to be given run out by a TV umpire.

=== 2nd Test ===
26–30 November 1992
scorecard

South Africa	v	India
292 (110.5 overs); Brian McMillan 98 (203); Manoj Prabhakar 4/90 (29 overs)		227 (108 overs); Sachin Tendulkar 111 (270); Brian McMillan 4/74 (29 overs)
252 (118.2 overs); Andrew Hudson 53 (157); Anil Kumble 6/53 (44 overs)		141/4 (82 overs); Ajay Jadeja 43 (117); Craig Matthews 2/23 (20 overs)

Match drawn
New Wanderers Stadium, Johannesburg
Umpires: Steve Bucknor (WI) and Barry Lambson (SA)
Player of the match: Brian McMillan (SA)

- South Africa won the toss and decided to bat.
- Craig Matthews (SA) made his Test debut.

=== 3rd Test ===
26–29 December 1992
scorecard

India	v	South Africa
212 (95.5 overs); Mohammad Azharuddin 60 (88); Allan Donald 5/55 (27 overs)		275 (138.4 overs); Hansie Cronje 135 (410); Venkatapathy Raju 3/73 (46 overs)
215 (73 overs); Kapil Dev 129 (180); Allan Donald 7/84 (28 overs)		155/1 (51.1 overs); Kepler Wessels 95* (169); Sachin Tendulkar 1/9 (3 overs)

South Africa won by 9 wickets
St George's Park, Port Elizabeth
Umpires: Rudi Koertzen (SA) and David Shepherd (Eng)
Player of the match: Allan Donald (SA)

- South Africa won the toss and decided to field.

=== 4th Test ===
2–6 January 1993
scorecard

South Africa	v	India
360/9d (171 overs); Jonty Rhodes 86 (236); Anil Kumble 3/101 (47 overs)		276 (151.4 overs); Sachin Tendulkar 73 (208); Craig Matthews 3/32 (28 overs)
130/6d (97 overs); Kepler Wessels 34 (122); Javagal Srinath 4/33 (27 overs)		29/1 (14 overs); Ajay Jadeja 20* (47); Craig Matthews 1/17 (6 overs)

Match drawn
Newlands, Cape Town
Umpires: Barry Lambson (SA) Karl Liebenberg (SA)
Player of the match: Javagal Srinath (Ind)

- South Africa won the toss and decided to bat.
- Daryll Cullinan (SA) made his Test debut.

== ODI series ==
=== 1st ODI ===
7 December 1992 (D/N)
Scorecard

India; 184 (50 overs)	v	South Africa; 185/4 (49.3 overs)
AD Jadeja 48 (69); WJ Cronje 5/32 (10 overs)		PN Kirsten 56 (90); SR Tendulkar 1/25 (10 overs)

South Africa won by 6 wickets
Newlands Cricket Ground, Cape Town
Umpires: SB Lambson and KE Liebenberg
Player of the match: WJ Cronje (SA)

- India won the toss and elected to bat.
- DJ Callaghan and PS de Villiers (both SA) made their ODI debuts.

=== 2nd ODI ===
9 December 1992 (D/N)
Scorecard

India; 147 (49.4 overs)	v	South Africa; 148/4 (46.4 overs)
WV Raman 33 (60); BM McMillan 4/32 (9.4 overs)		DJ Callaghan 45* (82); Kapil Dev 1/19 (9 overs)

South Africa won by 6 wickets
St George's Park Cricket Ground, Port Elizabeth
Umpires: RE Koertzen and CJ Mitchley
Player of the match: BM McMillan (SA)

- India won the toss and elected to bat.
- BN Schultz (SA) made his ODI debut.

=== 3rd ODI ===
11 December 1992 (D/N)
Scorecard

South Africa; 214/5 (50 overs)	v	India; 215/6 (49.1 overs)
AC Hudson 87 (130); A Kumble 2/29 (10 overs)		WV Raman 114 (148); CR Matthews 3/56 (10 overs)

India won by 4 wickets
Centurion Park, Verwoerdburg
Umpires: WA Diedricks and SB Lambson
Player of the match: WV Raman (IND)

- India won the toss and elected to field.

=== 4th ODI ===
13 December 1992 (D/N)
Scorecard

India; 161/9 (50 overs)	v	South Africa; 165/4 (48.3 overs)
M Azharuddin 49 (84); AA Donald 3/27 (10 overs)		KC Wessels 45 (96); J Srinath 2/39 (9.3 overs)

South Africa won by 6 wickets
New Wanderers Stadium, Johannesburg
Umpires: KE Liebenberg and CJ Mitchley
Player of the match: JN Rhodes (SA)

- South Africa won the toss and elected to field.

=== 5th ODI ===
15 December 1992 (D/N)
Scorecard

India; 207/4 (50 overs)	v	South Africa; 208/2 (47.2 overs)
M Azharuddin 86* (106); PS de Villiers 1/37 (10 overs)		AC Hudson 108 (147); A Kumble 1/34 (10 overs)

South Africa won by 8 wickets
Goodyear Park, Bloemfontein
Umpires: RE Koertzen and SB Lambson
Player of the match: AC Hudson (SA)

- South Africa won the toss and elected to field.
- V Yadav (IND) made his ODI debut.

=== 6th ODI ===
17 December 1992 (D/N)
Scorecard

South Africa; 216/8 (50 overs)	v	India; 177 (47.5 overs)
KC Wessels 78 (120); Kapil Dev 3/23 (10 overs)		M Azharuddin 41 (73); MW Pringle 3/51 (10 overs)

South Africa won by 39 runs
Kingsmead Cricket Ground, Durban
Umpires: WA Diedricks and KE Liebenberg
Player of the match: Kapil Dev (IND)

- India won the toss and elected to field.

=== 7th ODI ===
19 December 1992 (D/N)
Scorecard

South Africa; 203/8 (50 overs)	v	India; 204/5 (47.2 overs)
KC Wessels 57 (99); SLV Raju 3/37 (10 overs)		PK Amre 84* (98); CR Matthews 2/44 (10 overs)

India won by 5 wickets
Buffalo Park, East London
Umpires: RE Koertzen and CJ Mitchley
Player of the match: PK Amre (IND)

- India won the toss and elected to field.
