= England XI in South Africa in 1989–90 =

International cricket tour

	South Africa	England XI
- Dates: 26 January 1990 – 22 February 1990
Captains	Jimmy Cook	Mike Gatting

Test series
- Result: South Africa won the 2-match series 1–0
Most runs	Adrian Kuiper (84)	Chris Broad (48); Tim Robinson (48)
Most wickets	Allan Donald (8)	Richard Ellison (5)

One Day International series
- Results: South Africa won the 4-match series 3–1
Most runs	Adrian Kuiper (162)	Kim Barnett (236)
Most wickets	Allan Donald (7)	Mike Gatting (10)

In January 1990, a representative team of English cricket players undertook the final so-called "Rebel tour" to South Africa, to play a series of matches against the South African team. At the time, the International Cricket Council had placed a moratorium on international cricket teams undertaking tours of the country, due to the South African government's policy of apartheid, leaving South Africa with no international competition.

== Background ==
During the 1980s, as a result of the boycott of South Africa by sporting bodies, the International Cricket Council had prevented official tours to South Africa. This had led to a number of so-called "rebel" tours, with individual players contracted to tour as part of unofficial representative teams. Since 1982, when the first rebel tour took place, a total of six tours had been undertaken by sides representing England, Australia, Sri Lanka and, perhaps most controversially, the West Indies. By 1990 however, South Africa was in the midst of a major societal shake-up, as the ruling National Party had entered negotiations to repeal the ban on the African National Congress and release Nelson Mandela from prison. It was into this atmosphere that a seventh rebel cricket tour began at the end of January 1990, this time with players unofficially representing England. Unlike previous tours, which had been received by the white population in the country enthusiastically, this time, with South Africa going through major upheaval, the presence of the touring side seemingly representing the old order and, unlike on previous tours, being paid directly by the government, caused major protests right from the beginning. Virtually every game played during the tour featured demonstrations, with several riots taking place, and the police using both tear gas and rubber bullets to disperse protesters, while on one occasion the English players were pelted with stones.

== Squads ==
South Africa	(England) English XI
Jimmy Cook (c); Ray Jennings (wk); Trevor Madsen (wk); Peter Kirsten; Clive Rice; Adrian Kuiper; Henry Fotheringham; Kepler Wessels; Roy Pienaar; Brian McMillan; Dave Rundle; Richard Snell; Allan Donald; Mark Rushmere; Tim Shaw; Fanie de Villiers; Daryll Cullinan	Mike Gatting (c); Bruce French (wk); Bill Athey; Kim Barnett; Chris Broad; Chris Cowdrey; Graham Dilley; Richard Ellison; John Emburey; Neil Foster; David Graveney; Paul Jarvis; Matthew Maynard; Tim Robinson; Greg Thomas; Alan Wells

A number of the South African side, including captain Jimmy Cook, had played in the original rebel tour by the English side in 1982. Of the English players, only John Emburey had appeared in the 1982 tour - following his three-year international ban for appearing in that series, he had returned to the England side, and was part of the successful 1986-87 Ashes tour. Three of the English players, Gatting, Emburey and Chris Cowdrey, had served as England captain during the 1988 West Indies tour to England, while a number had full test caps.

The original 16 names for the England XI made public during the summer of 1989 included two black players: Phillip DeFreitas and Roland Butcher. They both withdrew from the tour and were replaced by Greg Thomas and Alan Wells.

== Matches ==
The tour itself was originally scheduled to include two "test" and five one-day matches between the touring party and the South African team, as well as another four tour matches against other opposition. However, as a result of the significant protests over the course of the touring team's time in South Africa, the tour was cut short by a week, with the second test match and original one-day series cancelled and instead replaced by four one-day games.

=== Tour matches ===
==== Combined Bowl XI v England XI ====
26 – 28 January 1990
Scorecard

England XI	v	Combined Bowl XI
305 (108.3 overs); MW Gatting 75; WK Watson 2/33 (17 overs); JD du Toit 2/55 (24 overs); P McLaren 2/64 (19 overs); IL Howell 2/27 (12/3 overs)		152 (64.2 overs); WS Truter 31; DA Graveney 6/45 (23.2 overs)
206/4 d (68 overs); CWJ Athey 70; HC Lindenburg 3/57 (16 overs)		105 (52.2 overs); JM Arthur 38; JE Emburey 5/36 (19.2 overs)

England XI won by 254 runs
Diamond Oval, Kimberley
Umpires: Karl Liebenberg (SA) and James Peacock (SA)

- England XI won the toss and elected to bat

==== South African Universities v England XI ====
30 January – 1 February 1990
Scorecard

South African Universities (South Africa)	v	England XI
328/6 d (106 overs); WJ Cronje 104; PW Jarvis 3/58 (19 overs)		212 (81.4 overs); JE Emburey 57; S Jacobs 5/29 (24 overs)
160/9 d (67 overs); LJ Wilkinson 40; NA Foster5/37 (22 overs)		75/4 (31.2 overs); BC Broad 32; T Bosch 2/24 (7 overs); CE Eksteen 2/11 (11.2 overs)

Match drawn
Springbok Park, Bloemfontein
Umpires: Rudi Koertzen (SA) and Rodger Symcox (SA)

- South African Universities won the toss and elected to bat

==== South African Invitational XI v England XI ====
3 – 5 February 1990
Scorecard

South African Invitational XI (South Africa)	v	England XI
305/2 d (98 overs); MW Rushmere 150*; NA Foster 1/40 (21 overs); JG Thomas 1/40 (19 overs)		292/5 d (91 overs); BC Broad 85; O Henry 3/115 (36 overs)
351/2 d (68 overs); MW Rushmere 151*; JG Thomas 1/56 (13 overs); RM Ellison 1/42 (9 overs)		198/5 (69.1 overs); AP Wells 48; O Henry 3/76 (30.1 overs)

Match drawn
Jan Smuts Stadium, Pietermaritzburg
Umpires: Barry Lambson (SA) and Cyril Mitchley (SA)

- South African Invitational XI won the toss and elected to bat

==== Transvaal v England XI ====
7 March 1990

Transvaal	v	England XI

Match cancelled
Wanderers, Johannesburg

- The match was cancelled following the premature ending of the tour

=== Test series ===
==== First Test ====
8 – 10 February 1990
Scorecard

England XI	v	South Africa
156 (65.5 overs); BC Broad 48; AA Donald 4/30 (21 overs); RP Snell 4/38 (22.5 overs)		203 (72.5 overs); AP Kuiper 84; RM Ellison 4/41 (15 overs)
122 (63 overs); KJ Barnett 24; AA Donald 4/29 (18 overs)		76/3 (24.1 overs); HR Fotheringham 38; MW Gatting 2/17 (6 overs)

South Africa won by seven wickets
Wanderers, Johannesburg
Umpires: Karl Liebenberg (SA) and James Peacock (SA)
Player of the match: AP Kuiper (SA)

- South Africa won the toss and elected to field

==== Second Test ====
16 – 21 February 1990
Scorecard

South Africa	v	England XI

Match Cancelled
Newlands, Cape Town

- The match was cancelled following an explosion near the ground

=== One-day Series ===
==== First ODI ====
16 February 1990
Scorecard

England XI; 217 (54.5 overs)	v	South Africa; 218/5 (52 overs)
MW Gatting 55; RP Snell 3/39 (11 overs); AP Kuiper 3/22 (7 overs)		SJ Cook 73; GR Dilley 2/36 (11 overs); CS Cowdrey 2/34 (10 overs)

South Africa won by five wickets
Centurion Park, Verwoerdburg
Umpires: Karl Liebenberg (SA) and Cyril Mitchley (SA)
Player of the match: AP Kuiper (SA)

- England XI won the toss and elected to bat

==== Second ODI ====
18 February 1990
Scorecard

South Africa; 219/5 (55 overs)	v	England XI; 205/7 (55 overs)
HR Fotheringham 51; KJ Barnett 3/33 (11 overs)		KJ Barnett 76; PS de Villiers 2/33 (9 overs)

South Africa won by 14 runs
Kingsmead, Durban
Umpires: Karl Liebenberg (SA) and Barry Lambson (SA)
Player of the match: KJ Barnett (Eng)

- South Africa won the toss and elected to bat

==== Third ODI ====
20 February 1990
Scorecard

South Africa; 301/7 (55 overs)	v	England XI; 94 (45.1 overs)
AP Kuiper 117; MW Gatting 3/54 (9 overs)		CWJ Athey 50; AA Donald 3/11 (9 overs)

South Africa won by 207 runs
Springbok Park, Bloemfontein
Umpires: Cyril Mitchley (SA) and James Peacock (SA)
Player of the match: AP Kuiper (SA)

- South Africa won the toss and elected to bat

==== Fourth ODI ====
22 February 1990
Scorecard

England XI; 296/8 (55 overs)	v	South Africa; 162 (37.2 overs)
KJ Barnett 136; AA Donald 2/56 (10 overs); RP Snell 2/44 (11 overs); CEB Rice 2/42 (9 overs)		HR Fotheringham 58; MW Gatting 6/26 (6.2 overs)

England XI won by 134 runs
Wanderers, Johannesburg
Umpires: Barry Lambson (SA) and Cyril Mitchley (SA)
Player of the match: KJ Barnett (Eng)

- England XI won the toss and elected to bat

=== Planned one-day series ===
The original tour schedule called for seven one-day games to be played following the conclusion of the two-match test series. The itinerary for the one-day series was:

1. St George's Park, Port Elizabeth; 23 February 1990
2. Kingsmead, Durban; 25 February 1990
3. Newlands, Cape Town; 27 February 1990
4. Centurion Park, Verwoerdburg; 1 March 1990
5. Wanderers, Johannesburg; 3 March 1990
6. Springbok Park, Bloemfontein; 5 March 1990
7. vs. Transvaal, Wanderers, Johannesburg; 7 March 1990

== Aftermath ==
The 1990 rebel tour was considered to be an unmitigated disaster, as the English players were seen to be shoring up the dying apartheid regime at the same time as freedoms were being implemented in South Africa. The day after the end of the test match, Nelson Mandela was freed from imprisonment, while the explosion outside Newlands convinced the organisers that continuing with the tour as planned was not viable, not least as it would potentially put the players safety at risk. A further planned tour by the English players, intended for the winter of 1990–91, and for which the players had signed up, was quickly cancelled, with the players receiving their full payments.

The players returned to England on 24 February to stinging headlines from the press. The sports writer Frank Keating, writing in The Guardian, stated "No more inglorious, downright disgraced and discredited team or sportsmen wearing the badge of 'England' can ever have returned through customs with such nothingness to declare". Each member of the squad received a three-year ban from international cricket for taking part; as with the 1982 tour, this led to the ending of international careers for a number of players, although both captain Mike Gatting and all-rounder John Emburey returned to the England side after their bans expired, with Gatting falling victim to the Ball of the Century from Shane Warne in the first game of the 1993 Ashes series.

In 1991, as part of the deconstruction of apartheid in South Africa, the two separate governing bodies of cricket in the country, the South African Cricket Union, and the multi-racial South African Cricket Board, elected to merge to form the single United Cricket Board of South Africa (UCBSA). This was a pivotal moment, as it meant that the governance of cricket was no longer divided on racial lines, which was the key reason behind the ICC's ban in the first place. At a meeting of the ICC in London in July 1991, the UCBSA made its case for readmission, a cause in which it received the powerful backing of Jagmohan Dalmiya, the Secretary of the Board of Control for Cricket in India. Despite reservations from both Pakistan and the West Indies, the meeting formally approved South Africa's readmission to the ICC. A meeting held the following October endorsed South Africa's participation in the 1992 Cricket World Cup, while India, in a predicament following the cancellation of a tour of the country by Pakistan, invited the South Africans to undertake a one-day international series. On 10 November 1991, the South African cricket team took to the field at Eden Gardens in Calcutta for their first official international game in more than twenty-one years, first game against India, and first ever official one-day international. The following April, the team undertook its first ever tour to the West Indies, where they played South Africa's first test match since the fourth test against Australia in March 1970.
