= Mandela Trophy =

International cricket tournament

- Dates: 2 December 1994 – 12 January 1995
- Administrator: ICC
- Cricket format: 50 overs
- Host: South Africa
- Champions: South Africa
- Participants: 4
- Matches: 14
- Player of the series: (Pakistan) Aamer Sohail
- Most runs: (Pakistan) Aamer Sohail (432)
- Most wickets: (Pakistan) Waqar Younis (21)

The Mandela Trophy was a one-day International cricket tournament which took place from 2 December 1994 to 12 January 1995. The tournament was hosted by South Africa, who were one of the four sides competing, with the others being New Zealand, Pakistan and Sri Lanka. Each side played each other twice before the two with the most points took part in a best of three finals series. The finals were contested between Pakistan and South Africa with the hosts winning 2–0.

Man of the Series Aamer Sohail scored 432 runs while his teammate Waqar Younis was the tournament's leading wicket taker with 21 victims. The tournament saw Sanath Jayasuriya, Adam Parore, Dave Callaghan and Michael Rindel all make their maiden ODI hundreds.

== Squads ==
New Zealand Squad Ken Rutherford (c) Adam Parore (wk) Martin Crowe Richard de Groen Simon Doull Stephen Fleming Lee Germon Chris Harris Blair Hartland Dion Nash Mark Priest Chris Pringle Murphy Su'a Shane Thomson Bryan Young	Pakistan Squad Saleem Malik (c) Rashid Latif (wk) Aamer Sohail Aaqib Javed Akram Raza Asif Mujtaba Ata-ur-Rehman Basit Ali Ijaz Ahmed Inzamam-ul-Haq Kabir Khan Manzoor Elahi Moin Khan Saeed Anwar Waqar Younis Saeed Anwar	South Africa Squad Hansie Cronje (c) Dave Richardson (wk) Dave Callaghan Daryll Cullinan Fanie de Villiers Allan Donald Clive Eksteen Andrew Hudson Steven Jack Gary Kirsten Brian McMillan Craig Matthews Jonty Rhodes Michael Rindel Eric Simons Richard Snell Pat Symcox	Sri Lanka Squad Arjuna Ranatunga (c) Pubudu Dassanayake (wk) Hashan Tillakaratne (wk) Aravinda de Silva Kumar Dharmasena Asanka Gurusinha Sanath Jayasuriya Ruwan Kalpage Roshan Mahanama Muttiah Muralitharan Ravindra Pushpakumara Chaminda Vaas Pramodya Wickramasinghe

== Points table ==
Place	Team	Played	Won	Lost	NR	Points
1	Pakistan	6	5	1	0	10
2	South Africa	6	4	2	0	8
3	Sri Lanka	6	2	3	1	5
4	New Zealand	6	0	5	1	1

== Group matches ==
=== 1st match ===
2 December 1994 (D/N)
Scorecard

Sri Lanka; 238/5 (50 overs)	v	Pakistan; 239/4 (47.5 overs)
A Ranatunga 101* (108); Aaqib Javed 2/44 (10 overs)		Aamer Sohail 100 (118); ST Jayasuriya 1/31 (6 overs)

Pakistan won by 6 wickets
Kingsmead, Durban
Umpires: KE Liebenberg (SA) and DL Orchard (SA)
Player of the match: A Ranatunga (SL)

- Sri Lanka won the toss and elected to bat.

=== 2nd match ===
4 December 1994
Scorecard

Pakistan; 245/9 (50 overs)	v	Sri Lanka; 233/9 (50 overs)
Aamer Sohail 67 (94); WPUJC Vaas 3/46 (8 overs)		PA de Silva 95 (105); Aamer Sohail 3/46 (10 overs)

Pakistan won by 12 runs
Centurion Park, Centurion, Gauteng
Umpires: WA Diedricks (SA) and RE Koertzen (SA)
Player of the match: Aamer Sohail (PAK)

- Sri Lanka won the toss and elected to field.

=== 3rd match ===
6 December 1994 (D/N)
Scorecard

South Africa; 203/8 (50 overs)	v	New Zealand; 134 (39.5 overs)
WJ Cronje 38 (63); C Pringle 2/29 (10 overs)		KR Rutherford 40 (73); MJR Rindel 2/15 (5 overs)

South Africa won by 69 runs
Newlands, Cape Town
Umpires: SB Lambson (SA) and CJ Mitchley (SA)
Player of the match: MJR Rindel (SA)

- South Africa won the toss and elected to bat.
- MJR Rindel (SA) made his ODI debut.

=== 4th match ===
8 December 1994 (D/N)
Scorecard

Sri Lanka; 288/4 (50 overs)	v	New Zealand; 66/1 (14.3 overs)
ST Jayasuriya 140 (143); C Pringle 3/29 (10 overs)		AC Parore 31* (48); KR Pushpakumara 1/18 (5 overs)

No result
Goodyear Park, Bloemfontein
Umpires: WA Diedricks (SA) and RE Koertzen (SA)

- Sri Lanka won the toss and elected to bat.
- LK Germon (NZ) made his ODI debut.

=== 5th match ===
10 December 1994
Scorecard

Pakistan; 214 (49.1 overs)	v	South Africa; 215/3 (45.4 overs)
Ijaz Ahmed 73 (86); RP Snell 4/37 (9.1 overs)		WJ Cronje 81 (104); Waqar Younis 2/38 (9.4 overs)

South Africa won by 7 wickets
New Wanderers, Johannesburg
Umpires: SB Lambson (SA) and CJ Mitchley (SA)
Player of the match: WJ Cronje (SA)

- Pakistan won the toss and elected to bat.

=== 6th match ===
11 December 1994
Scorecard

South Africa; 314/7 (50 overs)	v	New Zealand; 233 (40.3 overs)
DJ Callaghan 169* (143); ML Su'a 4/59 (10 overs)		AC Parore 108 (95); DJ Callaghan 3/32 (6 overs)

South Africa won by 81 runs
Centurion Park, Centurion, Gauteng
Umpires: KE Liebenberg (SA) and DL Orchard (SA)
Player of the match: DJ Callaghan (SA)

- South Africa won the toss and elected to bat.

=== 7th match ===
13 December 1994 (D/N)
Scorecard

New Zealand; 201 (49.4 overs)	v	Pakistan; 206/5 (46.2 overs)
MD Crowe 83 (99); Waqar Younis 4/32 (10 overs)		Aamer Sohail 75 (95); C Pringle 3/43 (10 overs)

Pakistan won by 5 wickets
St George's Park Cricket Ground, Port Elizabeth
Umpires: RE Koertzen (SA) and CJ Mitchley (SA)
Player of the match: Aaqib Javed and Waqar Younis (both PAK)

- Pakistan won the toss and elected to field.

=== 8th match ===
15 December 1994 (D/N)
Scorecard

Sri Lanka; 226/8 (50 overs)	v	South Africa; 191 (47.5 overs)
PA de Silva 73 (95); EO Simons 3/51 (10 overs)		AC Hudson 44 (75); M Muralitharan 2/23 (10 overs)

Sri Lanka won by 35 runs
Goodyear Park, Bloemfontein
Umpires: SB Lambson (SA) and DL Orchard (SA)
Player of the match: A Ranatunga (SL)

- Sri Lanka won the toss and elected to bat.
- SD Jack (SA) made his ODI debut.

=== 9th match ===
17 December 1994
Scorecard

South Africa; 206/8 (50 overs)	v	Pakistan; 208/2 (35 overs)
JN Rhodes 61 (77); Waqar Younis 4/52 (10 overs)		Ijaz Ahmed 114* (90); PS de Villiers 1/46 (10 overs)

Pakistan won by 8 wickets
Kingsmead, Durban
Umpires: WA Diedricks (SA) and KE Liebenberg (SA)
Player of the match: Ijaz Ahmed (PAK)

- Pakistan won the toss and elected to field.

=== 10th match ===
18 December 1994
Scorecard

New Zealand; 255/4 (50 overs)	v	Sri Lanka; 257/5 (47.1 overs)
KR Rutherford 102* (98); WPUJC Vaas 1/33 (10 overs)		HP Tillakaratne 68* (86); DJ Nash 2/52 (10 overs)

Sri Lanka won by 5 wickets
Buffalo Park, East London
Umpires: CJ Mitchley (SA) and DL Orchard (SA)
Player of the match: KR Rutherford (NZ)

- New Zealand won the toss and elected to bat.

=== 11th match ===
19 December 1994 (D/N)
Scorecard

New Zealand; 172 (47.4 overs)	v	Pakistan; 175/5 (38.5 overs)
BR Hartland 44 (69); Waqar Younis 4/33 (8.4 overs)		Aamer Sohail 52 (62); MW Priest 2/27 (6 overs)

Pakistan won by 5 wickets
Buffalo Park, East London
Umpires: WA Diedricks (SA) and SB Lambson (SA)
Player of the match: Waqar Younis (PAK)

- New Zealand won the toss and elected to bat.

=== 12th match ===
21 December 1994 (D/N)
Scorecard

South Africa; 237/8 (50 overs)	v	Sri Lanka; 139/6 (34 overs)
DJ Cullinan 63 (75); HDPK Dharmasena 4/37 (10 overs)		HP Tillakaratne 36* (52); CR Matthews 3/22 (7 overs)

South Africa won by 44 runs (Highest scoring consecutive overs)
St George's Park Cricket Ground, Port Elizabeth
Umpires: RE Koertzen (SA) and KE Liebenberg (SA)
Player of the match: CR Matthews (SA)

- South Africa won the toss and elected to bat.
- Sri Lankan target was reduced to 184 off 34 overs.

== Final series ==
South Africa won the best of three final series against Pakistan 2-0.

=== 1st Final ===
10 January 1995 (D/N)
Scorecard

South Africa; 215 (49.3 overs)	v	Pakistan; 178 (42.5 overs)
DJ Cullinan 64 (90); Waqar Younis 3/32 (9.3 overs)		Aamer Sohail 71 (74); EO Simons 4/42 (8 overs)

South Africa won by 37 runs
Newlands, Cape Town
Umpires: CJ Mitchley (SA) and DL Orchard (SA)
Player of the match: EO Simons (SA)

- Pakistan won the toss and elected to field.

=== 2nd Final ===
12 January 1995 (D/N)
Scorecard

South Africa; 266/5 (50 overs)	v	Pakistan; 109 (32.3 overs)
MJR Rindel 106 (139); Saleem Malik 1/24 (4 overs)		Wasim Akram 26 (42); PS de Villiers 3/21 (7 overs)

South Africa won by 157 runs
New Wanderers, Johannesburg
Umpires: KE Liebenberg (SA) and CJ Mitchley (SA)
Player of the match: MJR Rindel (SA)

- Pakistan won the toss and elected to field.

== Statistical leaders ==
Most runs

Player	Runs	Average
Aamer Sohail (Pakistan)	432	54.00
Adam Parore (New Zealand)	279	55.80
Sanath Jayasuriya (Sri Lanka)	269	44.83
Arjuna Ranatunga (Sri Lanka)	266	66.50
Hansie Cronje (South Africa)	266	33.25
Ijaz Ahmed (Pakistan)	252	42.00
Aravinda de Silva (Sri Lanka)	237	39.50

Most wickets

Player	Wickets	Average
Waqar Younis (Pakistan)	21	17.47
Eric Simons (South Africa)	14	17.78
Aaqib Javed (Pakistan)	11	26.45
Chris Pringle (New Zealand)	9	27.77
Hansie Cronje (South Africa)	8	20.87
Chaminda Vaas (Sri Lanka)	8	25.75
Fanie de Villiers (South Africa)	8	29.37
