= West Indian cricket team in South Africa in 1998–99 =

	South Africa	West Indies
- Dates: 10 November 1998 – 7 February 1999
Captains	WJ Cronje	BC Lara (Tests and 1st-3rd and 7th ODIs); CL Hooper (4th-6th ODIs)

Test series
- Result: South Africa won the 5-match series 5–0
Most runs	JH Kallis (485)	RD Jacobs (313)
Most wickets	SM Pollock (29)	CA Walsh (22)
- Player of the series: JH Kallis (SA)

One Day International series
- Results: South Africa won the 7-match series 6–1
Most runs	WJ Cronje (285)	S Chanderpaul (328)
Most wickets	WJ Cronje (11); L Klusener (11); SM Pollock (11)	KLT Arthurton (12)
- Player of the series: L Klusener (SA)

The West Indies cricket team toured South Africa during the 1998–99 season and played a five-match Test series and a seven-match One Day International series against the South Africa national cricket team, as well as nine tour matches. This was the first Test series between the two teams in South Africa.

West Indies was led in the Test series by Brian Lara while South Africa was led by Hansie Cronje.

South Africa won the Test series 5–0 and the ODI series 6–1. The Test series victory was only the seventh 5–0 victory in a five-match series in Test cricket history.

Jacques Kallis of South Africa emerged as the top run-scorer in the Test series with 485 runs, with an average of 69.28. Shaun Pollock finished the series as top wicket-taker with 29 wickets. Kallis was named "man of the Test series".

== Squads ==
Tests		ODIs	
South Africa	West Indies	South Africa	West Indies
Hansie Cronje (c); Shaun Pollock (vc); Paul Adams; Adam Bacher (1st Test only); Mark Boucher (wk); Daryll Cullinan; Allan Donald; Herschelle Gibbs (2nd-5th Tests); Jacques Kallis; Gary Kirsten; Lance Klusener (4th-5th Tests); Jonty Rhodes; Pat Symcox (1st-3rd Tests); David Terbrugge	Brian Lara (c); ~~Jimmy Adams~~; Curtly Ambrose; Shivnarine Chanderpaul; Mervyn Dillon; Daren Ganga; Carl Hooper; Ridley Jacobs (wk); Clayton Lambert; Nixon McLean; Junior Murray (wk); ~~Dinanath Ramnarine~~; Franklyn Rose; Philo Wallace; Courtney Walsh; Stuart Williams	Hansie Cronje (c); Shaun Pollock (vc); Dale Benkenstein; Nicky Boje; Mark Boucher (wk); Daryll Cullinan; Steve Elworthy; Herschelle Gibbs; Andrew Hall; Jacques Kallis; Gary Kirsten; Lance Klusener; Victor Mpitsang; Jonty Rhodes; Michael Rindel; Pat Symcox; Henry Williams	Brian Lara (c); Curtly Ambrose; Keith Arthurton; Shivnarine Chanderpaul; Daren Ganga; Carl Hooper; Ridley Jacobs (wk); Reon King; Rawl Lewis; Neil McGarrell; Nixon McLean; Junior Murray (wk); Floyd Reifer; Keith Semple; Philo Wallace

Jimmy Adams was injured before the start of the Test series and was replaced by Floyd Reifer. Dinanath Ramnarine was injured before the start of the Test series and was replaced by Rawl Lewis. The bowling attack was reinforced during the Test series by the addition of Ottis Gibson and Reon King.

== Test matches ==
=== 1st Test ===
26–30 November 1998
Scorecard

West Indies	v	South Africa
261 (97 overs); S Chanderpaul 74 (210); SM Pollock 5/54 (23 overs)		268 (93.5 overs); G Kirsten 62 (144); CA Walsh 4/66 (25 overs)
170 (81.3 overs); RD Jacobs 42 (126); SM Pollock 4/49 (20.3 overs)		164/6 (62.4 overs); JH Kallis 57* (152); CA Walsh 3/45 (21 overs)

South Africa won by 4 wickets
New Wanderers, Johannesburg
Umpires: CJ Mitchley (SA) and DR Shepherd (ENG)
Player of the match: SM Pollock (SA)

- West Indies won the toss and elected to bat.
- DJ Terbrugge (SA) and RD Jacobs (WI) made their Test debuts.

=== 2nd Test ===
10–12 December 1998
Scorecard

South Africa	v	West Indies
245 (70.4 overs); PL Symcox 36 (71); CA Walsh 4/87 (23.4 overs)		121 (37.3 overs); SC Williams 37 (64); SM Pollock 5/43 (13.3 overs)
195 (63.5 overs); JN Rhodes 64 (106); CEL Ambrose 6/51 (19 overs)		141 (38.2 overs); BC Lara 39 (49); AA Donald 5/49 (14.2 overs)

South Africa won by 178 runs
St George's Park Cricket Ground, Port Elizabeth
Umpires: RE Koertzen (SA) and DR Shepherd (ENG)
Player of the match: SM Pollock (SA)

- West Indies won the toss and elected to field.
- The match was scheduled for five days but completed in three.

=== 3rd Test ===
26–29 December 1998
Scorecard

West Indies	v	South Africa
198 (71.1 overs); BC Lara 51 (91); JH Kallis 3/18 (10 overs)		312 (98 overs); JN Rhodes 87 (129); FA Rose 7/84 (28 overs)
259 (82.2 overs); BC Lara 79 (139); SM Pollock 5/83 (27 overs)		147/1 (48.4 overs); G Kirsten 71* (152); CL Hooper 1/50 (19 overs)

South Africa won by 9 wickets
Kingsmead Cricket Ground, Durban
Umpires: DL Orchard (SA) and RB Tiffin (ZIM)
Player of the match: JN Rhodes (SA)

- South Africa won the toss and elected to field.
- The match was scheduled for five days but completed in four.
- D Ganga (WI) made his Test debut.

=== 4th Test ===
2–6 January 1999
Scorecard

South Africa	v	West Indies
406/8d (146.5 overs); DJ Cullinan 168 (306); M Dillon 3/99 (33.5 overs)		212 (85 overs); CL Hooper 86 (152); AA Donald 3/20 (6 overs)
226/7d (87.4 overs); JH Kallis 88* (257); NAM McLean 3/53 (16 overs)		271 (91.4 overs); RD Jacobs 69* (144); JH Kallis 5/90 (27.4 overs)

South Africa won by 149 runs
Newlands Cricket Ground, Cape Town
Umpires: DL Orchard (SA) and S Venkataraghavan (IND)
Player of the match: JH Kallis (SA)

- South Africa won the toss and elected to bat.

=== 5th Test ===
15–18 January 1999
Scorecard

South Africa	v	West Indies
313 (92.5 overs); MV Boucher 100 (183); CA Walsh 6/80 (24.5 overs)		144 (47.1 overs); BC Lara 68 (77); AA Donald 5/49 (13 overs)
399/5d (115.2 overs); G Kirsten 134 (305); CL Hooper 3/117 (36.2 overs)		217 (75.2 overs); RD Jacobs 78 (92); PR Adams 4/64 (21.2 overs)

South Africa won by 351 runs
Centurion Park, Centurion, Gauteng
Umpires: RE Koertzen (SA) and S Venkataraghavan (IND)
Player of the match: South Africa team

- West Indies won the toss and elected to field.
- The match was scheduled for five days but completed in four.
- RD King (WI) made his Test debut.

== ODI series summary ==
=== 1st ODI ===
22 January 1999 (D/N)
Scorecard

West Indies; 154/4 (28 overs)	v	South Africa; 160/8 (27 overs)
CL Hooper 66* (61); L Klusener 2/38 (6 overs)		JN Rhodes 30 (25); RD King 2/23 (6 overs)

South Africa won by 2 wickets (D/L method)
New Wanderers, Johannesburg
Umpires: SB Lambson and CJ Mitchley
Player of the match: CL Hooper (WI)

- South Africa won the toss and elected to field.
- The match was reduced to 46 overs per side, then to 28 overs. South Africa's target was revised to 160.
- South Africa were fined 1 over for a slow over rate.
- KF Semple (WI) made his ODI debut.

=== 2nd ODI ===
24 January 1999
Scorecard

West Indies; 292/9 (50 overs)	v	South Africa; 249 (46.5 overs)
S Chanderpaul 150 (136); SM Pollock 6/35 (10 overs)		JH Kallis 51 (66); MV Boucher 51 (52); RD King 3/40 (10 overs)

West Indies won by 43 runs
Buffalo Park, East London
Umpires: DF Becker and RE Koertzen
Player of the match: S Chanderpaul (WI)

- South Africa won the toss and elected to field.
- HS Williams (SA) made his ODI debut.

=== 3rd ODI ===
27 January 1999 (D/N)
Scorecard

South Africa; 274/9 (50 overs)	v	West Indies; 219 (43.1 overs)
L Klusener 64 (74); CL Hooper 4/52 (10 overs)		S Chanderpaul 52 (44); JH Kallis 3/24 (10 overs)

South Africa won by 55 runs
Kingsmead Cricket Ground, Durban
Umpires: WA Diedricks and DL Orchard
Player of the match: WJ Cronje (SA)

- South Africa won the toss and elected to bat.
- AJ Hall (SA) made his ODI debut.

=== 4th ODI ===
30 January 1999
Scorecard

South Africa; 278/6 (50 overs)	v	West Indies; 179 (41.3 overs)
HH Gibbs 125 (146); KLT Arthurton 4/56 (10 overs)		CL Hooper 57 (40); WJ Cronje 3/30 (6.3 overs)

South Africa won by 99 runs
St George's Park Cricket Ground, Port Elizabeth
Umpires: DF Becker and RE Koertzen
Player of the match: HH Gibbs (SA)

- West Indies won the toss and elected to field.

=== 5th ODI ===
2 February 1999 (D/N)
Scorecard

South Africa; 221/8 (50 overs)	v	West Indies; 132 (42.4 overs)
DM Benkenstein 69 (90); NAM McLean 3/41 (10 overs)		S Chanderpaul 40 (73); WJ Cronje 3/10 (9 overs)

South Africa won by 89 runs
Newlands Cricket Ground, Cape Town
Umpires: RE Koertzen and DL Orchard
Player of the match: L Klusener (SA)

- South Africa won the toss and elected to bat.
- D Ganga (WI) made his ODI debut.

=== 6th ODI ===
5 February 1999
Scorecard

South Africa; 273 (49.5 overs)	v	West Indies; 159 (40.3 overs)
WJ Cronje 82 (79); KLT Arthurton 4/44 (6.5 overs)		RN Lewis 49 (91); SM Pollock 3/23 (8 overs)

South Africa won by 114 runs
Goodyear Park, Bloemfontein
Umpires: WA Diedricks and DL Orchard
Player of the match: WJ Cronje (SA)

- South Africa won the toss and elected to bat.
- PV Mpitsang (SA) made his ODI debut.

=== 7th ODI ===
7 February 1999
Scorecard

South Africa; 226/8 (50 overs)	v	West Indies; 176 (44.5 overs)
JH Kallis 66 (94); RD King 2/30 (10 overs)		JR Murray 57 (64); L Klusener 3/31 (7.5 overs)

South Africa won by 50 runs
Centurion Park, Centurion, Gauteng
Umpires: SB Lambson and CJ Mitchley
Player of the match: JH Kallis (SA)

- South Africa won the toss and elected to bat.
