= South African cricket team in India in 1991–92 =

International cricket tour

| | India | South Africa |
- Dates: 10 – 14 November 1991
| Captains | Mohammad Azharuddin | Clive Rice |

One Day International series
- Results: India won the 3-match series 2–1
| Most runs | Sanjay Manjrekar (158) | Kepler Wessels (211) |
| Most wickets | Venkatapathy Raju (5) | Allan Donald (9) |
- Player of the series: Sanjay Manjrekar and Kepler Wessels

The South African cricket team toured India in the 1991–92 season. The tour was significant in that it was South Africa's first official international cricket series since their suspension from the sport in 1970 due to the apartheid policy. The tour was hastily arranged barely a month after South Africa's readmission to international cricket, as a result of Pakistan's national team pulling out of their pre-arranged tour of India.

The tour consisted of a series of three One Day International (ODI) matches against the Indian national team and were the first-ever official ODIs played by South Africa. India won the series 2–1, and the Men of the Series were Sanjay Manjrekar of India and Kepler Wessels of South Africa.

== Squads ==
Squads
| India Mohammad Azharuddin (c) Pravin Amre Kapil Dev Sanjay Manjrekar Kiran More (wk) Chandrakant Pandit (wk) Manoj Prabhakar Venkatapathy Raju Ravi Shastri Navjot Singh Sidhu Krishnamachari Srikkanth Javagal Srinath Sachin Tendulkar Dilip Vengsarkar | South Africa Clive Rice (c) Jimmy Cook Allan Donald Clive Eksteen Andrew Hudson Peter Kirsten Adrian Kuiper Craig Matthews Brian McMillan Dave Richardson (wk) Tim Shaw Richard Snell Kepler Wessels Mandy Yachad Ali Bacher (manager) |

== Match details ==
=== 1st ODI ===
10 November 1991
(scorecard)

| South Africa; 177/8 (47 overs) | v | India; 178/7 (40.4 overs) |
| Kepler Wessels 50 (95); Manoj Prabhakar 2/26 (10 overs) | | Sachin Tendulkar 62 (73); Allan Donald 5/29 (8.4 overs) |

India won by 3 wickets
Eden Gardens, Calcutta, India
Umpires: V. K. Ramaswamy and R. S. Rathore
Player of the match: Allan Donald and Sachin Tendulkar

- India won the toss and elected to field first.
- Match reduced to 47 overs a side.
- Pravin Amre (Ind), Jimmy Cook, Andrew Hudson, Peter Kirsten, Adrian Kuiper, Clive Rice, Richard Snell, Brian McMillan, Dave Richardson, Tim Shaw, Allan Donald all (SA) made their ODI debuts.
- 10 South African players made their ODI debuts except Kepler Wessels who had previously played for Australia.
- Allan Donald (SA) took a five-wicket haul for South Africa in its first ever ODI and became the third bowler to take a five-wicket haul in an ODI on debut.

The first match was South Africa's first-ever ODI and their first cricket match of any sort against India. The attendance was reported to be over 90,000.

The match was reduced to 47 overs per side. India won the toss and chose to field. South Africa scored 177/8 in their 47 overs with notable contributions from Wessels (50) and Adrian Kuiper (43). In their reply, India started badly with Allan Donald grabbing the first 3 wickets to leave India at 20/3. Sachin Tendulkar (62) and debutant Pravin Amre (55) guided India close to victory and despite Donald dismissing both of them to complete a 5-wicket haul, the lower order finished the game for India to give them a 1–0 lead in the series.

=== 2nd ODI ===
12 November 1991
(scorecard)

| India; 223/6 (45 overs) | v | South Africa; 185/8 (45 overs) |
| Kris Srikkanth 68 (86); Allan Donald 3/36 (9 overs) | | Kepler Wessels 71 (96); Venkatapathy Raju 3/43 (9 overs) |

India won by 38 runs
Captain Roop Singh Stadium, Gwalior, India
Umpires: S. K. Bansal and R. V. Ramani
Player of the match: Kepler Wessels

- Match reduced to 45 overs a side.

The second match of the series was reduced to 45 overs per side. South Africa won the toss and inserted India. Half-centuries from Kris Srikkanth (68), Navjot Sidhu (61) and Sanjay Manjrekar (52*) helped India to a total of 223/6. In reply, South Africa could only score 185/8 leaving India with a 2–0 lead in the series. Kepler Wessels again top-scored for South Africa with 71.

=== 3rd ODI ===
14 November 1991
(scorecard)

| India; 287/4 (50 overs) | v | South Africa; 288/2 (46.4 overs) |
| Ravi Shastri 109 (149); Allan Donald 1/55 (10 overs) | | Kepler Wessels 90 (105); Venkatapathy Raju 1/48 (10 overs) |

South Africa won by 8 wickets
Jawaharlal Nehru Stadium, New Delhi, India
Umpires: Subrata Banerjee and Pilloo Reporter
Player of the match: Kepler Wessels

In the third match, India won the toss and Ravi Shastri, the stand-in captain for the absent Mohammad Azharuddin, chose to bat. Shastri (109), Kris Srikkanth (53) and Sanjay Manjrekar (105) again scored the bulk of the runs with India finishing on 287/4. South Africa reached their target with more than 3 overs to spare thanks to half-centuries from Kepler Wessels (90), Peter Kirsten (86*) and Adrian Kuiper (63*). This was South Africa's first-ever ODI victory.
