= 1994 Austral-Asia Cup =

International cricket tournament

- Cricket format: One Day International
- Tournament format(s): Round robin and Knockout
- Host(s): United Arab Emirates
- Champions: Pakistan (3rd title)
- Runners-up: India
- Participants: 6
- Matches: 9
- Player of the series: (Pakistan) Aamer Sohail
- Most runs: (Pakistan) Aamer Sohail (274)
- Most wickets: (India) J Srinath (10)

The 1994 Austral-Asia Cup was a cricket tournament held in Sharjah, UAE, between April 13–22, 1994. Six national teams took part: Australia, India, New Zealand, Pakistan, Sri Lanka and United Arab Emirates.

The teams were divided into two groups of three who played each other, round robin, with the winner and runner-up of each group progressing to the semi-finals.

Pakistan won the tournament, defeating India by 39 runs in the final. Australia and New Zealand reached the semi-finals, while Sri Lanka and United Arab Emirates were knocked out in the first round.

The tournament was sponsored by Pepsi.

== Group stage ==
=== Group A ===
Team	P	W	L	T	NR	RR	Points
Pakistan	2	2	0	0	0	5.453	4
India	2	1	1	0	0	5.098	2
United Arab Emirates	2	0	2	0	0	3.476	0

13 April 1994
Scorecard
Wisden report

India; 273/5 (50 overs)	v	United Arab Emirates; 202/9 (50 overs)
VG Kambli 82* (66); Sohail Butt 2/52 (10 overs)		Mazhar Hussain 70 (112); Bhupinder Singh 3/34 (10 overs)

India won by 71 runs
Sharjah Cricket Stadium, Sharjah, UAE
Umpires: K Kanjee (ZIM) and SB Lambson (SA)
Player of the match: VG Kambli (IND)

- United Arab Emirates won the toss and elected to field.
- AC Bedade and Bhupinder Singh (both IND), and the entire United Arab Emirates team made their ODI debuts.

15 April 1994
Scorecard
Wisden report

India; 219 (46.3 overs)	v	Pakistan; 223/4 (44.3 overs)
SR Tendulkar 73 (64); Aaqib Javed 2/41 (9 overs)		Basit Ali 75* (76); RK Chauhan 3/47 (10 overs)

Pakistan won by 6 wickets
Sharjah Cricket Stadium, Sharjah, UAE
Umpires: SB Lambson (SA) and KE Liebenberg (SA)
Player of the match: Saeed Anwar (PAK)

- Pakistan won the toss and elected to field.

17 April 1994
Scorecard
Wisden report

United Arab Emirates; 145 (49.5 overs)	v	Pakistan; 146/1 (23.1 overs)
JA Samarasekera 31* (75); Arshad Laeeq 31 (68); Wasim Akram 3/19 (10 overs)		Aamer Sohail 51* (67); Saleem Raza 1/17 (3 overs)

Pakistan won by 9 wickets
Sharjah Cricket Stadium, Sharjah, UAE
Umpires: K Kanjee (ZIM) and KE Liebenberg (SA)
Player of the match: Ata-ur-Rehman (PAK)

- United Arab Emirates won the toss and elected to bat.

=== Group B ===
Team	P	W	L	T	NR	RR	Points
Australia	2	2	0	0	0	4.323	4
New Zealand	2	1	1	0	0	4.240	2
Sri Lanka	2	0	2	0	0	3.709	0

14 April 1994
Scorecard
Wisden report

Sri Lanka; 154 (49.3 overs)	v	Australia; 158/1 (36.5 overs)
HP Tillakaratne 64 (97); SK Warne 3/29 (10 overs)		MA Taylor 68* (106); WPUJC Vaas 1/35 (10 overs)

Australia won by 9 wickets
Sharjah Cricket Stadium, Sharjah, UAE
Umpires: K Kanjee (ZIM) and KE Liebenberg (SA)
Player of the match: ME Waugh (AUS)

- Sri Lanka won the toss and elected to bat.
- MG Bevan and JL Langer (both AUS), and UDU Chandana and AMN Munasinghe (both SL) made their ODI debuts.

16 April 1994
Scorecard
Wisden report

New Zealand; 207/9 (50 overs)	v	Australia; 208/3 (47.5 overs)
BA Young 63 (97); SK Warne 4/34 (10 overs)		DC Boon 68 (98); DK Morrison 1/22 (6 overs)

Australia won by 7 wickets
Sharjah Cricket Stadium, Sharjah, UAE
Umpires: K Kanjee (ZIM) and SB Lambson (SA)
Player of the match: SK Warne (AUS)

- New Zealand won the toss and elected to bat.
- MW Douglas (NZ) made his ODI debut.

18 April 1994
Scorecard
Wisden report

New Zealand; 217/8 (50 overs)	v	Sri Lanka; 215/9 (50 overs)
SA Thomson 50 (42); AP Gurusinha 1/30 (10 overs)		AP Gurusinha 117* (140); DJ Nash 3/43 (10 overs)

New Zealand won by 2 runs
Sharjah Cricket Stadium, Sharjah, UAE
Umpires: SB Lambson (SA) and KE Liebenberg (SA)
Player of the match: AP Gurusinha (SL)

- Sri Lanka won the toss and elected to field.
- HT Davis (NZ) and AP Weerakkody (SL) made their ODI debuts.

== Knockout stage ==
Semi-finals
19 April
Australia	244/9
India	245/3
20 April
Pakistan	328/2
New Zealand	266/7

Final
22 April
Pakistan	250/6
India	211

=== Semi-finals ===
19 April 1994
Scorecard
Wisden report

Australia; 244/9 (50 overs)	v	India; 245/3 (45.4 overs)
SR Waugh 53 (72); J Srinath 3/32 (9 overs)		AD Jadeja 87 (106); SK Warne 2/40 (9 overs)

India won by 7 wickets
Sharjah Cricket Stadium, Sharjah, UAE
Umpires: K Kanjee (ZIM) and SB Lambson (SA)
Player of the match: AD Jadeja (IND)

- Australia won the toss and elected to bat.

20 April 1994
Scorecard
Wisden report

Pakistan; 328/2 (50 overs)	v	New Zealand; 266/7 (50 overs)
Inzamam-ul-Haq 137* (129); C Pringle 1/57 (10 overs)		AC Parore 82 (102); Wasim Akram 2/50 (10 overs)

Pakistan won by 62 runs
Sharjah Cricket Stadium, Sharjah, UAE
Umpires: K Kanjee (ZIM) and KE Liebenberg (SA)
Player of the match: Inzamam-ul-Haq (PAK)

- New Zealand won the toss and elected to field.

=== Final ===
22 April 1994
Scorecard
Wisden report

Pakistan; 250/6 (50 overs)	v	India; 211 (47.4 overs)
Aamer Sohail 69 (87); RK Chauhan 3/29 (9 overs)		VG Kambli 56 (99); Aamer Sohail 2/22 (5 overs)

Pakistan won by 39 runs
Sharjah Cricket Stadium, Sharjah, UAE
Umpires: SB Lambson (SA) and KE Liebenberg (SA)
Player of the match: Aamer Sohail (PAK)

- India won the toss and elected to field.

== See also ==
- Austral-Asia Cup
