= Third umpire =

Role in some cricket matches

Third Umpire
- Member of: Elite Panel of ICC Umpires
- Appointer: International Cricket Council

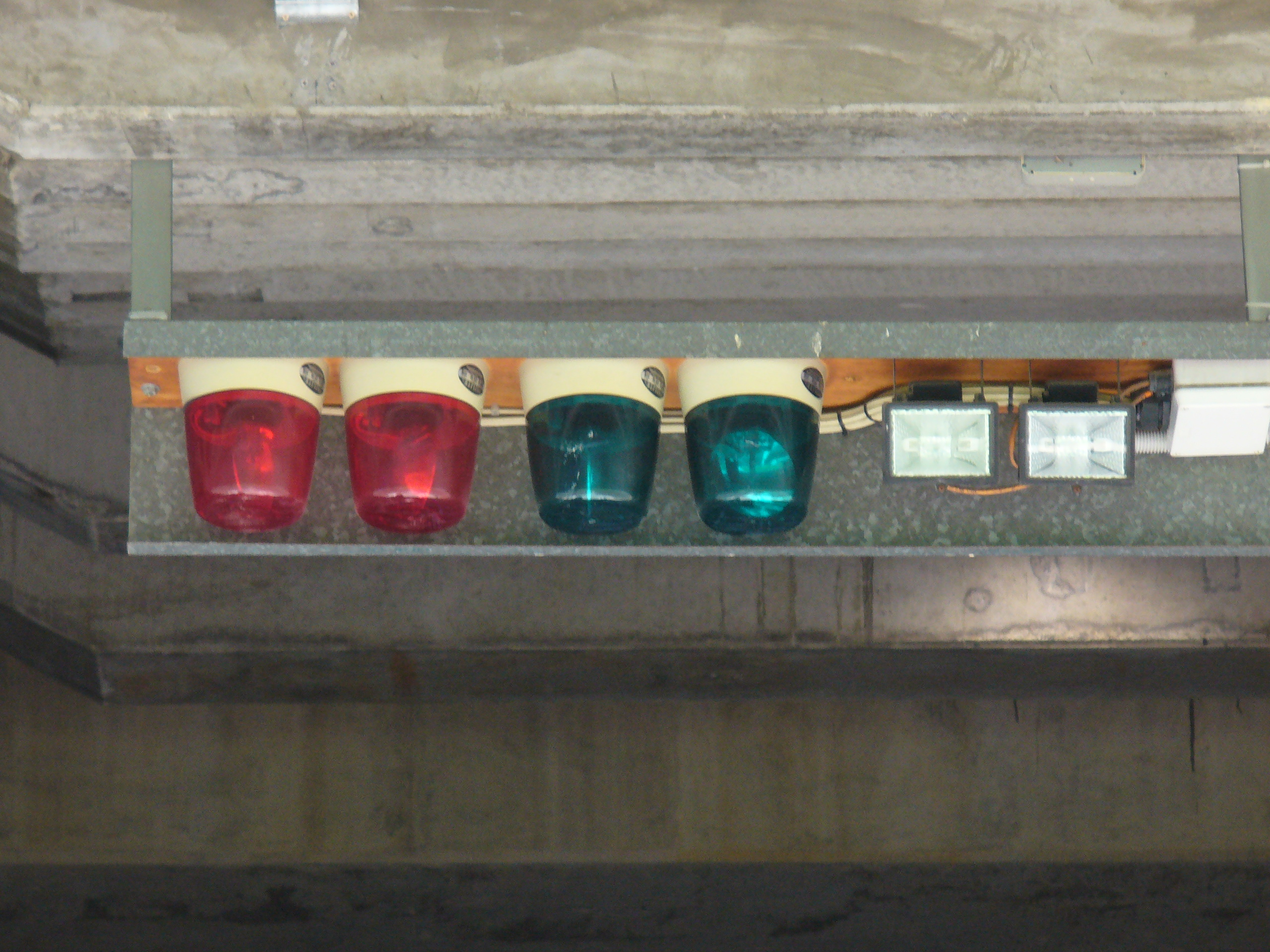
The third umpire lights at the Melbourne Cricket Ground

The third umpire (or TV Umpire) is an off-field umpire used in some cricket matches, particularly international matches. Their role is to make the final decision in questions referred to them by the two on-field umpires or the players.

The third umpire is also there to act as an emergency on-field umpire if required.

== History ==
The third umpire was the brainchild of Dr Ali Bacher, the former Managing Director of the United Cricket Board of South Africa and Mike Demaine, the senior cricket producer at the South African Broadcasting Television sports department. The idea was conceived in a meeting between Ali Bacher & Mike Demaine at the UCBSA offices in Johannesburg in 1991 & used for the first time in South African domestic cricket competitions that season (with the approval of the ICC). After the successful use of the technology in 1991 the ICC then agreed for the UCBSA and the SABC to use the technology in the television coverage of international matches in South Africa in 1992.

It debuted in Test cricket in November 1992 at Kingsmead, Durban for the South Africa vs. India series. Karl Liebenberg was the third umpire, with Cyril Mitchley the on-field umpire, who referred the run out decision in this match. Sachin Tendulkar became the first batsman to be dismissed (run out) by using television replays in the second day of the Test scoring 11.

== Appointment ==
The third umpire is appointed from the Elite Panel of ICC Umpires or the International Panel of ICC Umpires for Test matches, ODIs, and T20Is.

For all Test matches, and for ODIs where DRS is used, the third umpire is appointed by the ICC, and is a different nationality to the two sides. For ODIs where DRS is not used, and for all T20Is, the third umpire is appointed by the home side's Governing body.

== Functions ==
=== Decision requests ===
An on-field umpire can, at his own discretion, use a radio link to refer particular types of close decision to the third umpire, this is called an Umpire Review. When the full Umpire Decision Review System is not in use, the third umpire uses television replays (only) to assist him in coming to a decision.

When the full DRS is in use, players can also initiate reviews of particular decisions by the on-field umpires, this is called a Player Review. These are judged by the third umpire, and the third umpire has the full range of technology available beyond simple replays, for both Umpire Reviews and Player Reviews.

=== Emergency on-field umpire ===
In the case of injury or illness to one of the on-field umpires, the third umpire will take his place. The third umpire duties will then be taken on by the fourth umpire.

For example, during the 4th ODI between Australia and India at Canberra in 2015–16, umpire Richard Kettleborough was injured during Australia's innings and was replaced by third umpire Paul Wilson.

== See also ==
- Fourth umpire
- Instant replay in Major League Baseball
