= Bradley Player =

South African cricketer (born 1967)

Bradley Todd Player (born 18 January 1967, in Benoni) is a former South African first class cricketer for Free State and Western Province. An all-rounder, his career lasted from 1984/85 until 2000/01. He bowled both right-arm fast-medium and offbreaks and as a right-handed batsman he made 4 first class hundreds. Player was also a regular for South Africa in the Hong Kong Sixes.

In February 2020, he was named in South Africa's squad for the Over-50s Cricket World Cup in South Africa. However, the tournament was cancelled during the third round of matches due to the coronavirus pandemic.
