= Keith Semple (cricketer) =

Guyanese cricketer (born 1970)

Personal information
- Full name: Keith Fitzpatrick Semple
- Born: 21 August 1970 (age 56); Georgetown, Guyana
- Batting: Right-handed
- Bowling: Right-arm medium pace

International information
- National side: West Indies
- ODI debut: 22 January 1999 v South Africa
- Last ODI: 7 February 1999 v South Africa

Domestic team information
- Years: Team
- 1989–2001: Guyana

Career statistics
Competition	ODIs	FC	LA
Matches	7	56	54
Runs scored	64	2,311	1,095
Batting average	10.66	27.51	26.70
100s/50s	0/0	2/17	0/8
Top score	23	142	79
Balls bowled	132	825	984
Wickets	3	6	11
Bowling average	40.33	57.66	54.63
5 wickets in innings	0	0	0
10 wickets in match	0	0	0
Best bowling	2/35	2/34	3/13
Catches/stumpings	2/–	60/–	14/–
- Source: Cricket Archive, 25 October 2010

Keith Fitzpatrick Semple (born August 21, 1970) is a Guyanese cricketer who played for the West Indies in 1998/99. He has never had the chance to make a name for himself on the Test stage, but he was called up for One day matches during the 1998/99 season against South Africa.

Semple is a right-handed batsman and a fast pace bowler.
