= Louis Wilkinson (cricketer) =

South African cricketer (born 1966)

Personal information
- Born: 19 November 1966 (age 59); Vereeniging, South Africa
- Source: Cricinfo, 1 December 2020

Louis Wilkinson (born 19 November 1966) is a South African cricketer. He played in 118 first-class and 137 List A matches from 1986/87 to 2002/03.
