= Brett Schultz =

South African cricketer (born 1970)

Personal information
- Full name: Brett Nolan Schultz
- Born: 26 August 1970 (age 56); East London, South Africa
- Batting: Left-handed
- Bowling: Left-arm fast

International information
- National side: South Africa (1992–1997)
- Test debut (cap 251): 13 November 1992 v India
- Last Test: 6 October 1997 v Pakistan
- Only ODI (cap 24): 9 December 1992 v India

Career statistics
Competition	Test	ODI	FC	LA
Matches	9	1	60	80
Runs scored	9	–	309	17
Batting average	1.50	–	7.53	4.25
100s/50s	0/0	–	0/0	0/0
Top score	6	–	36*	5
Balls bowled	1,733	54	12,062	4,022
Wickets	37	1	233	136
Bowling average	20.24	35.00	24.40	18.44
5 wickets in innings	2	0	12	1
10 wickets in match	0	0	0	0
Best bowling	5/48	1/35	8/36	6/22
Catches/stumpings	2/–	0/–	10	12/0
- Source: ESPNcricinfo, 17 January 2022

Brett Schultz (born 26 August 1970) is a former South African cricketer who played in nine Test matches and one One Day International between 1992 and 1997. During the course of his career, he also played for Eastern Province, Western Province and Gauteng.

Schultz’s fast-paced left-handed bowling caused major problems for both right- and left-handed batsmen, evidenced by the 20 wickets which fell in the three-Test series against Sri Lanka in 1993–94, his debut tour.

Described in 2013 by the Indian Express as "one of the most intimidating opponents in world cricket", Schultz made his mark on the world stage despite his career being plagued by injury.

While he only lasted nine Tests, the "Bear", as he was aptly named for his menacing demeanour on field, added excitement and character to the cricket pitch and an air of tension for batsmen and fans alike whenever he thundered towards the bowling crease.

Following his cricketing career, and after a stint as owner of All Bar None on Bree Street, Cape Town, Schultz turned to business. He is now a Director at short-term insurance specialists, Econorisk Broker Consultants, an independent South African-based risk management and short-term insurance business.

Shultz is also ambassador for the Sasfin Bank Cape Town Cricket Sixes, alongside cricketers Allan Donald, Jacques Rudolph and Meyrick Pringle. The event, the biggest sixes tournament in Africa, takes place at The Western Province Cricket Club and aims to raise money for underprivileged children.

== Charitable work ==
Schultz is actively involved in supporting a number of charitable organisations, including TEARS Animal Rescue, SOS Children's Villages SA and Acres of Love. He supports the Breatheasy Programme at the Red Cross War Memorial Children’s Hospital, a programme for parents of children reliant on tracheostomy or artificial ventilation for breathing. In November 2016, a fundraiser, initiated by Brett and sponsored by Econorisk, raised over R100,000 for the Breatheasy Tracheostomy and Ventilation Homecare Programme and the Red Cross.
