= Wayne Truter =

South African cricketer (born 1965)

Personal information
- Born: 27 June 1965 (age 61); Cape Town, South Africa
- Source: Cricinfo, 1 December 2020

Wayne Truter (born 27 June 1965) is a South African cricketer. He played in 58 first-class and 55 List A matches for Boland from 1987/88 to 1996/97.

== See also ==
- List of Boland representative cricketers
