= Henry Williams (cricketer) =

South African cricketer (born 1967)

Personal information
- Full name: Henry Smith Williams
- Born: 11 June 1967 (age 59); Pniel, Cape Province, South Africa
- Batting: Right-handed
- Bowling: Right-arm fast-medium

International information
- National side: South Africa (1999–2000)
- ODI debut: 24 January 1999 v West Indies
- Last ODI: 19 March 2000 v India

Domestic team information
- Years: Team
- 1990/91: Western Province
- 1992/93: Impalas
- 1992/93–2003/04: Boland

Career statistics
Competition	ODI	FC	LA
Matches	7	89	109
Runs scored	8	765	123
Batting average	8.00	8.13	3.96
100s/50s	0/0	0/0	0/0
Top score	7	49	15
Balls bowled	329	17,021	5,296
Wickets	9	276	122
Bowling average	25.33	24.26	29.22
5 wickets in innings	0	10	0
10 wickets in match	0	0	0
Best bowling	3/38	6/27	4/35
Catches/stumpings	2/–	24/–	17/–
Medal record
Representing South Africa
Men's Cricket
Commonwealth Games
Gold medal – first place	1998 Kuala Lumpur	List-A cricket
- Source: CricInfo, 30 January 2019

Henry Smith Williams (born 11 June 1967), is a retired South African cricketer. He played seven One Day Internationals for South Africa. Williams was a right-arm seam bowler and became the bowling coach at Boland after his retirement.

He and Herschelle Gibbs were banned from international cricket for six months in 2000 for match fixing. In the hearing, he admitted accepting money from Hansie Cronje to underperform in a One Day International in India. He had been bribed to concede more than 50 runs off his 10 overs, but sustained a legitimate injury and so bowled only 11 balls.

Although his suspension was only for six months, he was well into his 30s and, despite playing first-class cricket until 2003/04, he never returned to international cricket.

In February 2020, Williams was named in South Africa's squad for the Over-50s Cricket World Cup in South Africa. However, the tournament was cancelled during the third round of matches, due to the COVID-19 pandemic.

== See also ==
- List of cricketers banned for match fixing
