= Tim Shaw (cricketer) =

South African cricketer (born 1959)

Personal information
- Full name: Timothy Gower Shaw
- Born: 5 July 1959 (age 67); Empangeni, South Africa
- Batting: Left-handed
- Bowling: Slow left-arm orthodox

Career statistics
Competition	ODI	FC	LA
Matches	9	138	161
Runs scored	26	3,215	1,096
Batting average	13.00	23.12	17.67
100s/50s	0/0	1/9	0/1
Top score	17*	105	56*
Balls bowled	504	33,256	8,310
Wickets	9	417	173
Bowling average	33.11	29.05	27.20
5 wickets in innings	0	15	0
10 wickets in match	0	2	0
Best bowling	2/19	7/79	4/31
Catches/stumpings	2/–	107/–	42/–
- Source: Cricinfo, 7 March 2006

Timothy Gower Shaw (born 5 July 1959) is a former South African cricketer who played nine One Day Internationals between 1991 and 1994. He was also involved in the test series against England in England in 1994.
