= Jonty Rhodes =

South African cricketer (born 1969)

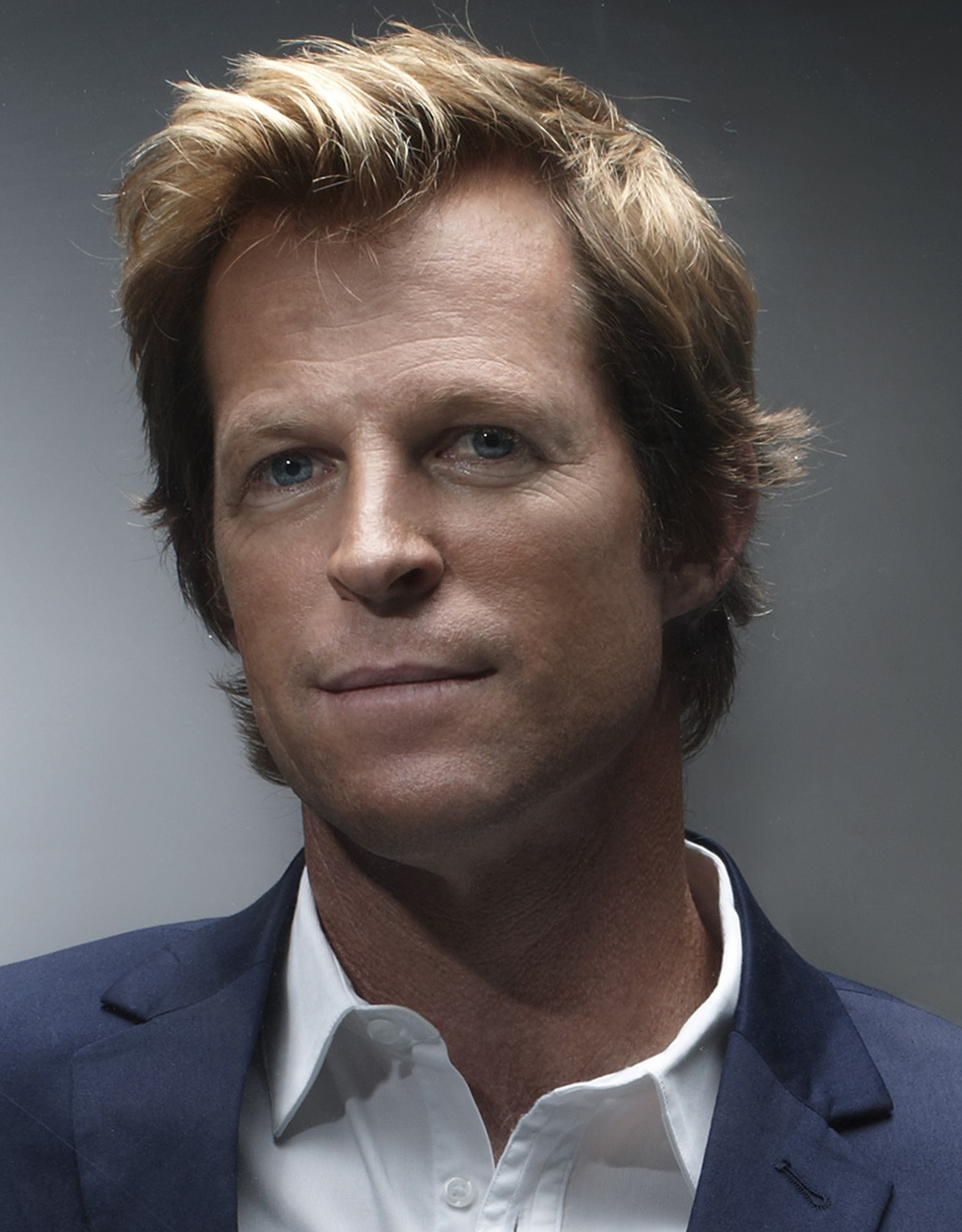
- Rhodes in 2013

Personal information
- Full name: Jonathan Neil Rhodes
- Born: 27 July 1969 (age 57); Pietermaritzburg, Natal Province, South Africa
- Batting: Right-handed
- Bowling: Right-arm medium
- Role: Middle-order batsman

International information
- National side: South Africa (1992–2003)
- Test debut: 13 November 1992 v India
- Last Test: 10 August 2000 v Sri Lanka
- ODI debut (cap 17): 26 February 1992 v Australia
- Last ODI: 12 February 2003 v Kenya
- ODI shirt no.: 8

Domestic team information
- Years: Team
- 1988–1992: University of Natal (Maritzburg)
- 1988/89–1997/98: Natal
- 1998/99–2002/03: KwaZulu-Natal
- 1999: Ireland
- 2003: Gloucestershire

Career statistics
Competition	Test	ODI	FC	LA
Matches	52	245	164	371
Runs scored	2,532	5,935	9,546	8,907
Batting average	35.66	35.11	41.14	32.86
100s/50s	3/17	2/33	22/52	2/51
Top score	117	121	172	121
Balls bowled	12	14	162	80
Wickets	0	0	1	2
Bowling average	–	–	83.00	22.50
5 wickets in innings	–	–	0	0
10 wickets in match	–	–	0	0
Best bowling	–	–	1/13	1/2
Catches/stumpings	34/–	105/–	127/–	158/–
- Source: CricInfo, 19 July 2009

Jonathan Neil "Jonty" Rhodes (born 27 July 1969) is a South African professional cricket coach, commentator and former Test and One Day International cricketer. He is regarded as one of the greatest fielders of all time and was the first South African cricketer to take 100 ODI catches. He played for the South African cricket team between 1992 and 2003. He is the fielding coach of the Lucknow Super Giants in the Indian Premier League. He is the fielding coach of Durban's Super Giants as well as the consultant fielding coach of the Sri Lanka national cricket team. Rhodes was a member of the South Africa cricket team that won the 1998 ICC KnockOut Trophy, the first ICC trophy the country has won.

Rhodes was born in Pietermaritzburg, Natal Province, South Africa. Whilst being noted for his quick running as a right-handed batsman, he was especially noted for his defensive fielding, particularly catching, ground fielding, and throwing from his most common position of backward point. A report prepared by Cricinfo in late 2005 showed that since the 1999 Cricket World Cup, he had effected the ninth-highest number of run outs in ODI cricket of any fieldsman, with the third-highest success rate.

During his career he also played club cricket for the University of Natal in Pietermaritzburg and first-class cricket for Gloucestershire County Cricket Club, KwaZulu-Natal, Natal and the Dolphins. Rhodes retired from Test cricket in 2000, and from one day cricket in 2003 after an injury during the 2003 Cricket World Cup.

Rhodes also represented South Africa at hockey, and was chosen as part of the 1992 Olympic Games squad to go to Barcelona; however, the squad did not qualify to go to the tournament. He was also called up for trials to play in the 1996 Olympics but was ruled out by a hamstring injury.

== Career highlights ==
=== Test career ===
Rhodes made his Test début against India in the first Test of the "Friendship Tour" at his home ground in Kingsmead, Durban on 13 November 1992, scoring 41 in the first innings and 26 not out in the second.

Rhodes scored his first Test century during the first Test of a three match series against Sri Lanka at Moratuwa during the 1993–1994 season. Batting on the last day, Rhodes scored 101 not out and along with Clive Eksteen salvaged a draw. South Africa went on to win the series 1–0 by winning the second match and drawing the third.

Rhodes announced his retirement from Test match cricket in 2001 in order to allow him to continue playing until the 2003 Cricket World Cup in South Africa. His last Test match was on 6 August 2000 at the Sinhalese Sports Club Ground, Colombo against Sri Lanka. Rhodes made scores of 21 and 54 in the two innings. Sri Lanka went on to win the match by six wickets. He was also well known for hitting reverse sweep and has also hit the first reverse sweep shot which had gone for a six.

=== ODI career ===
Rhodes made his One Day International début against Australia in South Africa's opening match of the 1992 Cricket World Cup at the Sydney Cricket Ground on 26 February 1992. Australia batted first, scoring 170, and Rhodes dismissed Craig McDermott via a run out. South Africa scored 171 to win the match by nine wickets; Rhodes was not required to bat.

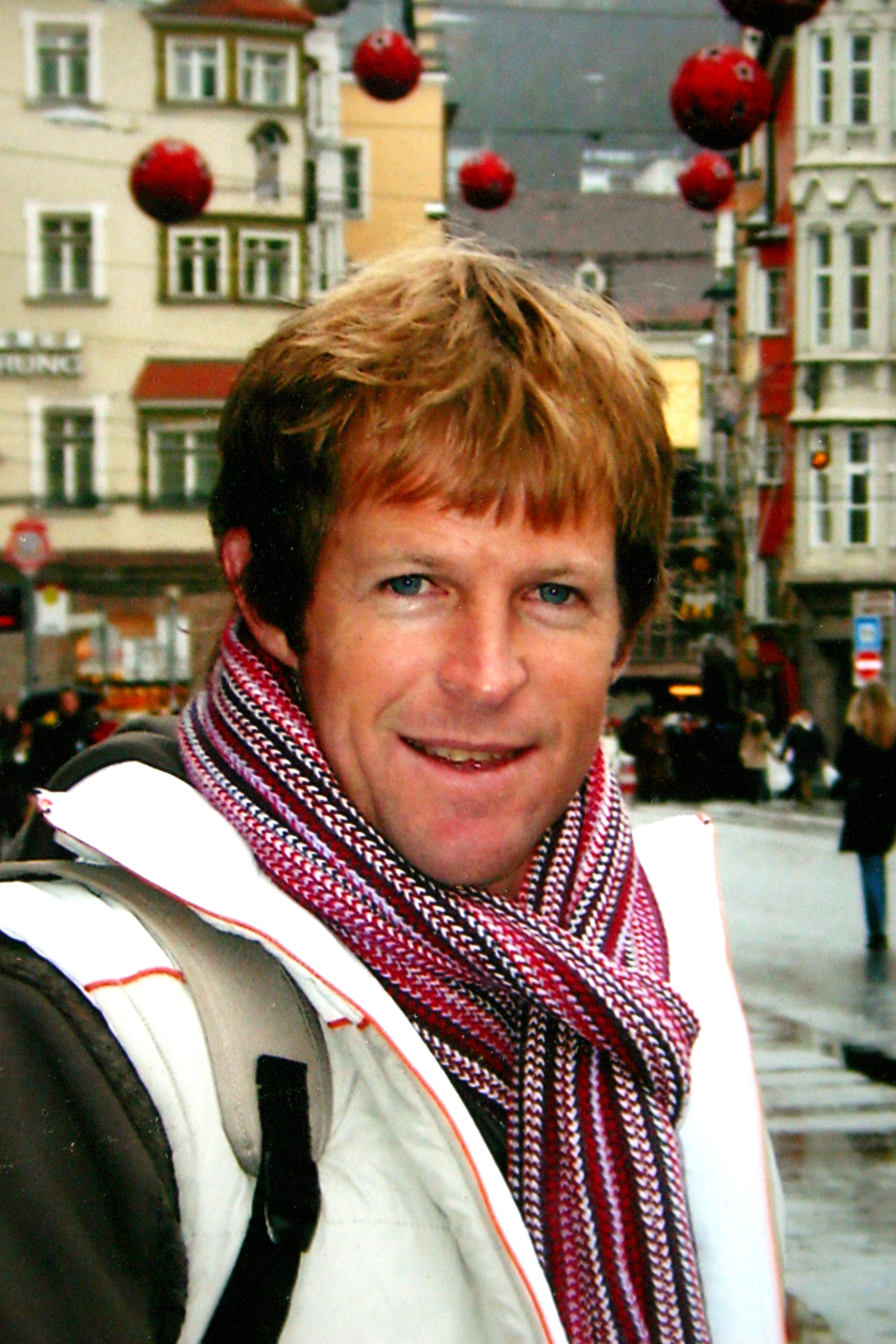
Rhodes in 2002

Rhodes shot to fame after South Africa's fifth game of the World Cup, against Pakistan on 8 March 1992 at the Brisbane Cricket Ground. South Africa batted first, scoring 211 off 50 overs. Pakistan's innings was reduced to 36 overs because of rain interruptions, with the target revised from 212 to 194 runs. Inzamam-ul-Haq and Pakistan captain Imran Khan resumed the innings when play was restarted. With the score at 135/2 Inzamam, who was at the time on 48, set off for a run but was turned back by Khan. The ball had rolled out towards Rhodes who ran in from backward point, gathered the ball and raced the retreating Inzamam to the wicket. Rhodes, with ball in hand, dived full length to break the stumps and effect the run out. The run out, the subject of a famous photograph by Jim Fenwick, is still considered one of the more spectacular feats of that World Cup and the defining moment of Rhodes' career. Pakistan's innings faltered from then on, eventually finishing on 173/8 with South Africa winning by twenty runs.

On 14 November 1993 Rhodes took a world record of five catches, to achieve the most dismissals by a fielder (other than a wicketkeeper) against the West Indies at Brabourne Stadium, Mumbai.

Rhodes announced that he planned to retire from One-Day International cricket after the 2003 Cricket World Cup in South Africa. However, his tournament was cut short when he got injured in a match against Kenya. In Kenya's innings, Maurice Odumbe hit the ball in the air toward Rhodes. Rhodes dropped the catch and in the process broke his hand. The South African team's medical staff concluded that it would take four to five weeks to heal, effectively ruling Rhodes out of the rest of the tournament. Rhodes was withdrawn from the squad and replaced by Graeme Smith.

== Post-retirement ==
After retiring from playing cricket Rhodes was employed by Standard Bank as an account executive and is also involved with the bank's cricket sponsorship in South Africa. Rhodes then worked as a fielding coach in the South African national cricket team. He was the fielding coach for IPL Team Mumbai Indians, followed by the fielding coach for Kings XI Punjab at the 13th season of Indian Premier League. The Kenyan cricket team announced that Rhodes had been hired as the team's assistant coach, assisting Kenya with fielding and batting until the 2011 Cricket World Cup.

In April 2013 South African Tourism appointed Rhodes as their brand ambassador for India.

== Coaching career ==
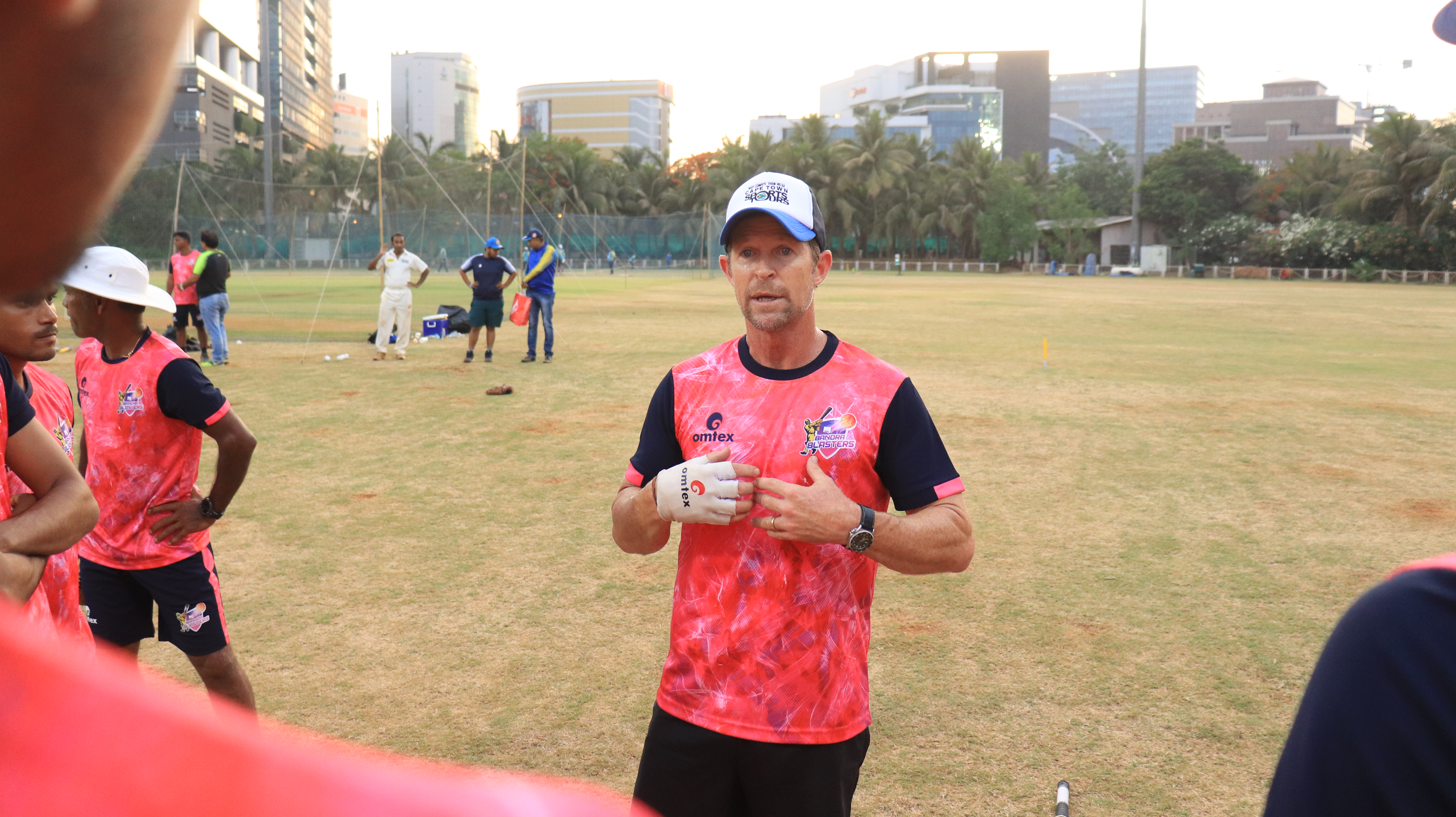
Rhodes in 2019

He was appointed as fielding coach for Punjab Kings. In September 2020, Rhodes signed a contract with the Swedish Cricket Federation, ahead of moving to Sweden on a permanent basis. In Feb 2022, he was also named as batting coach for Punjab Kings for IPL 2022 in addition to his responsibilities as fielding coach for the side. After the 2022 season of IPL, he was released from his position along with other coaching staff when Punjab Kings parted ways with their chief coach Anil Kumble. Before the start of 2023 season of IPL, Jonty was appointed by Lucknow Super Giants as their fielding coach.As of now he is the mentor and has signed a 3-Years Contract for Pokhara Avengers for the Inaugural Edition of Nepal Premier League (NPL) 2024.

== Recognition ==
- In 1999 he was voted as one of the Wisden Cricketers of the Year.
- In 2004 he was voted 29th in the Top 100 Great South Africans in SABC3's Great South Africans television series.
- In 2021 he got his Honorary Doctorate Degree from Invertis University for his exceptional performance in the field of Cricket.

== Personal life ==
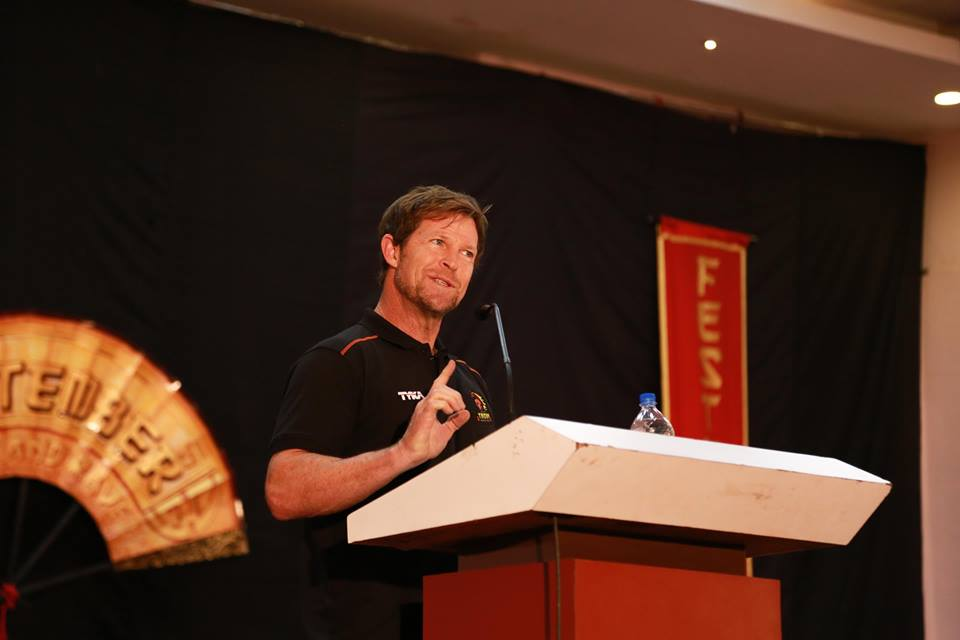
Rhodes in 2017

He married Kate McCarthy, a niece of former South African Test cricketer Cuan McCarthy, on 16 April 1994 in Pietermaritzburg. The couple have two children: a daughter, Daniella, and a son, Ross. The couple's divorce was finalized in 2013, after Rhodes left his wife for photographer Caroline McClelland in 2009. He and McClelland were then engaged till he broke off the engagement to marry architect Melanie Wolf in October 2014.

In April 2015, Rhodes' second wife Melanie (now a yoga teacher) gave birth in Mumbai to their daughter named India. The inspiration for her name came from India's rich mix of culture, heritage, and tradition. Rhodes has forged a bond with the country, leading to a spiritual awakening. Rhodes has described his special affiliation with the river Ganga, and shared his experience of swimming in the river on social media. In 2017, Jonty performed a puja for his daughter at Pejawar mutt at Mumbai. A regular visitor to India, Jonty and Melanie's second child Nathan, was also born in India in 2017.
