= Dave Orchard =

South African cricketer and umpire

Personal information
- Full name: David Lynton Orchard
- Born: 24 June 1948 (age 78); Pietermaritzburg, South Africa
- Batting: Left-handed
- Bowling: Right arm medium
- Role: Umpire

Domestic team information
- Years: Team
- 1967–1979: Natal
- FC debut: 26 January 1968 Natal B v Border
- Last FC: 13 January 1979 Natal B v Transvaal B
- LA debut: 30 March 1970 C Wesley's XI v R van der Poll's XI
- Last LA: 20 November 1971 Natal v Western Province

Umpiring information
- Tests umpired: 44 (1995–2004)
- ODIs umpired: 108 (1994–2003)

Career statistics
Competition	First-class	List A
Matches	43	5
Runs scored	1,634	38
Batting average	24.38	9.50
100s/50s	2/10	0/0
Top score	110 *	15
Balls bowled	3,018	282
Wickets	47	7
Bowling average	29.02	25.42
5 wickets in innings	1	0
10 wickets in match	0	0
Best bowling	7/90	3/24
Catches/stumpings	21/–	0/–
- Source: ESPNcricinfo, 1 September 2019

David Lynton Orchard (born 24 June 1948) is a South African former first-class cricketer, and former international umpire who stood in 44 Test matches and 107 One-Day Internationals.

== Biography ==
Orchard was born in Pietermaritzburg, South Africa. His father, Kenneth Orchard and uncle Eric Orchard played first-class cricket for Natal, and his son Justin Orchard for Free State.

== Playing career ==
He played first-class cricket as an all-rounder for Natal and Natal B between 1967/8 and 1978/9, scoring 1,634 runs at a batting average of 24.38 and taking 47 wickets at a bowling average of 29.02. He also played 5 games of List A cricket for Natal between 1969/70 and 1971/2, and played as a professional for Rawtenstall in the Lancashire League in 1972 and 1973.

== Umpiring career ==
Orchard became a first-class umpire in 1992. He made his international debut as an umpire at the One Day International "Mandela Tournament" in late 1994, standing in the match between Pakistan and Sri Lanka at Durban on 2 December 1994. He umpired several matches in the 1999 Cricket World Cup and 2003 Cricket World Cup. His last ODI as umpire was played between Pakistan and New Zealand at Rawalpindi on 7 December 2003.

He umpired his first Test in December 1995, standing with Steve Bucknor in the 3rd Test between South Africa and England at Kingsmead, Durban in December 1995. Orchard's last Test was the 3rd Test between Sri Lanka and Australia at the Sinhalese Sports Club Ground in Colombo in March 2004, again standing with Steve Bucknor.

He joined the Elite Panel of ICC Umpires when it was formed in 2002, but was demoted in 2004 along with Asoka de Silva and Russell Tiffin.

After leaving the international panel, he continued to stand in domestic cricket in Australia until 2010.

== See also ==
- List of Test cricket umpires
- List of One Day International cricket umpires
