= Andrew Hudson (cricketer) =

South African cricketer

Personal information
- Full name: Andrew Charles Hudson
- Born: 17 March 1965 (age 61); Eshowe, KwaZulu-Natal
- Batting: Right-handed
- Bowling: Right-arm medium
- Role: Opening Batsman

International information
- National side: South Africa
- Test debut: 18 April 1992 v West Indies
- Last Test: 6 March 1998 v Pakistan
- ODI debut: 10 November 1991 v India
- Last ODI: 8 November 1997 v Sri Lanka

Domestic team information
- Years: Team
- 1984–2000: Natal/KwaZulu-Natal

Career statistics
Competition	Test	ODI
Matches	35	89
Runs scored	2,007	2,559
Batting average	33.45	29.41
100s/50s	4/13	2/18
Top score	163	161
Balls bowled	–	6
Wickets	–	–
Bowling average	–	–
5 wickets in innings	–	–
10 wickets in match	–	–
Best bowling	–	–
Catches/stumpings	36/–	18/–
Medal record
Representing South Africa
Men's Cricket
Commonwealth Games
Gold medal – first place	1998 Kuala Lumpur	Team
- Source: ESPNcricinfo, 17 January 2006

Andrew Charles Hudson (born 17 March 1965) is a former South African Test and ODI cricketer. The right-handed batsman played 35 Tests and 89 One Day Internationals for South Africa in the 1990s.

His career spanned 16 consecutive seasons, playing for both his country and his province KwaZulu-Natal / Dolphins.

Andrew Hudson finished his career with 2,007 Test runs and 2,559 ODI runs.

== Retirement ==
His final year in first-class cricket came in 2000/01.
