= Clive Eksteen =

South African cricketer (born 1966)

Personal information
- Full name: Clive Edward Eksteen
- Born: 2 December 1966 (age 59); Johannesburg, South Africa
- Batting: Right-handed
- Bowling: Slow left-arm orthodox

Career statistics
Competition	Test	ODI
Matches	7	6
Runs scored	91	6
Batting average	10.11	–
100s/50s	0/0	0/0
Top score	22	6*
Balls bowled	1,536	222
Wickets	8	2
Bowling average	61.75	90.50
5 wickets in innings	0	0
10 wickets in match	0	0
Best bowling	3/12	1/26
Catches/stumpings	5/–	3/–
- Source: CricInfo, 25 January 2006

Clive Edward Eksteen (born 2 December 1966) played seven Test matches and six One Day Internationals for South Africa. In sixteen seasons at Transvaal (later Gauteng) he took 398 wickets at 30.05, also captaining the team for three seasons.

In March 2018 Eksteen was one of two Cricket South Africa (CSA) officials who were suspended after posing for a photograph with fans wearing Sonny Bill Williams masks in Port Elizabeth during the second Test between the Proteas and Australia. The masks appeared following a series of incidents involving David Warner and the South African cricket team and cricket fans in South Africa. The masks are in reference to a past encounter between David Warner's wife and Sonny Bill Williams. There was wide spread condemnation of a player's wife being "dragged through the mud" as an attempt "to shame her for her past."

Eksteen in May 2018 was allowed back to work at the CSA.

In October 2019, he was suspended from his position as commercial manager of Cricket South Africa along with interim director Corrie van Zyl and chief operating officer Naasei Appiah for alleged non-payment of commercial rights fees during 2018 Mzansi Super League. He later won his CCMA case for unlawfull dismissal. Further investigations by the CSA board later revealed in the Fundudzi report that former CEO Thabang Moroe and Naasei Appiah were responsible for the delay in payment.
