= Craig Matthews =

South African cricketer (born 1965)

Personal information
- Full name: Craig Russell Matthews
- Born: 15 February 1965 (age 61); Cape Town, South Africa
- Height: 192 cm (6 ft 4 in)
- Batting: Right-handed
- Bowling: Right-arm fast-medium
- Role: All rounder

Career statistics
Competition	Test	ODI
Matches	18	56
Runs scored	348	141
Batting average	18.31	10.84
100s/50s	0/1	0/0
Top score	62*	26
Balls bowled	3,980	3,003
Wickets	52	79
Bowling average	28.88	25.00
5 wickets in innings	2	0
10 wickets in match	0	0
Best bowling	5/42	4/10
Catches/stumpings	4/–	10/–
- Source: CricInfo, 25 January 2006

Craig Russell Matthews (born 15 February 1965 is a former South African cricketer who played in 18 Test matches and 56 One Day Internationals between 1991 and 1997.

Matthews was born in Cape Town, Cape Province, and attended Pinelands High School.
