= Wilf Diedricks =

South African cricket umpire (1945–2009)

Personal information
- Full name: Wilfred Andrew Diedricks
- Born: 6 March 1945; Cape Town, South Africa
- Died: 18 August 2009 (aged 64)

Umpiring information
- Tests umpired: 1 (1992)
- ODIs umpired: 31 (1992–2001)
- Source: Cricinfo, 5 July 2013

Wilf Diedricks (6 March 1945 – 18 August 2009) was a South African cricket umpire. The 32 international matches he officiated in included 31 ODI games between 1992 and 2001. The only Test match he officiated in was a fixture between South Africa and India, in 1992

== See also ==
- List of Test cricket umpires
- List of One Day International cricket umpires
