= Cyril Mitchley =

South African cricket player, umpire and match referee (born 1938)

Personal information
- Full name: Cyril John Mitchley
- Born: 4 July 1938 (age 88); Johannesburg, Transvaal, South Africa
- Batting: Right-handed
- Role: Wicket-keeper

Domestic team information
- Years: Team
- 1967/68–1968/69: Transvaal B
- 1970: A Bacher's XI
- FC debut: 27 January 1968 Transvaal B v Rhodesia
- Last FC: 14 February 1969 Transvaal B v Western Province
- LA debut: 30 March 1970 A Bacher's XI v JT Botten's XI
- Last LA: 4 April 1970 A Bacher's XI v C Wesley's XI

Umpiring information
- Tests umpired: 26 (1992–2000)
- ODIs umpired: 60 (1992–2000)
- FC umpired: 127 (1981–2001)
- LA umpired: 218 (1982–2001)

Career statistics
Competition	First-class	List A
Matches	8	2
Runs scored	224	53
Batting average	20.36	26.50
100s/50s	0/2	0/0
Top score	66	36
Catches/stumpings	20/9	4/0
- Source: CricketArchive, 22 December 2013

Cyril John Mitchley (born 4 July 1938) is a South African former cricket player, umpire and match referee. As an umpire he officiated in first-class and Test cricket matches.

== Playing career ==
During the late 1960s, Mitchley played for Transvaal as a wicket-keeper in South African domestic cricket.

== Umpiring and refereeing career ==
Mitchley later became an umpire, culminating with him becoming a Test cricket umpire. Between 1992 and 2000, he stood in 26 Test matches and 61 One Day Internationals (ODIs).

In a match between South Africa and India in 1992, Mitchley made the first referral to a third umpire in Test cricket history. Sachin Tendulkar was given out after Mitchley referred a run out decision.

He famously gave two LBWs when English bowler Dominic Cork took a hat-trick against the West Indies at Old Trafford in 1995.

Mitchley later became an ICC match referee, officiating on four ODIs, all in 2007.

== Personal life ==
His son, Cyril Mitchley Jr. (1960–2026), was also a cricket player and coach.

== See also ==
- List of Test cricket umpires
- List of One Day International cricket umpires
