= Brian McMillan =

South African cricketer (born 1963)

Personal information
- Full name: Brian Mervin McMillan
- Born: 22 December 1963 (age 62); Welkom, South Africa
- Height: 6 ft 4 in (193 cm)
- Batting: Right-handed
- Bowling: Right-arm medium-fast
- Role: All-rounder

International information
- National side: South Africa (1991–1998)

Domestic team information
- Years: Team
- 1984/85–1988/89: Transvaal
- 1986: Warwickshire
- 1989/90–1999/00: Western Province

Career statistics
Competition	Test	ODI
Matches	38	78
Runs scored	1,968	841
Batting average	39.35	23.36
100s/50s	3/13	1/0
Top score	113	127
Balls bowled	6,048	3,623
Wickets	75	70
Bowling average	33.82	36.98
5 wickets in innings	0	0
10 wickets in match	0	0
Best bowling	4/65	4/32
Catches/stumpings	49/–	42/–
- Source: CricInfo, 25 January 2006

Brian Mervin McMillan (born 22 December 1963) played 38 Test matches and 78 One Day Internationals for South Africa from 1991 to 1998. He was rated by many as the best all-rounder in the world in the mid-1990s, and won South African Cricket Annual Cricketer of the Year awards in 1991 and 1996.

McMillan was a right arm medium-pace bowler and right-handed batsman. He was also a leading slip fielder, and holds the highest percentage of catches per Test for an outfielder in South Africa Test cricket history.

== International career ==
McMillan made his Test debut in November 1992, against India at Durban, in South Africa's first home Test match in over 20 years. He was a key member of the South African team post their re-admittance to world cricket in 1991. McMillan made his ODI debut in November 1991, against India at Eden Gardens.

== Domestic career ==
In domestic cricket, he represented Transvaal for four seasons from 1984–85 to 1988–89, and Western Province from 1989–90 until his retirement in the 1999–00 season. He also spent a season with Warwickshire in 1986.

== Beyond cricket ==
McMillan has also been a professional teacher in Cape Town. He currently heads an office automation firm in Cape Town with his Family.
