= Mangaung Oval =

Cricket oval

- Interactive map of Mangaung Oval

Ground information
- Location: Bloemfontein, Free State, South Africa
- Country: South Africa
- Coordinates: 29°7′0.04″S 26°12′18.97″E
- Establishment: 1989
- Capacity: 20,000
- Owner: Mangaung Metropolitan Municipality
- Operator: Free State
- Tenants: Free State
- End names
- Loch Logan End; Willows End

International information
- First men's Test: 29 October–November 1999: South Africa v Zimbabwe
- Last men's Test: 6–8 October 2017: South Africa v Bangladesh
- First men's ODI: 15 December 1992: South Africa v India
- Last men's ODI: 9 September 2023: South Africa v Australia
- First men's T20I: 8 October 2010: South Africa v Zimbabwe
- Last men's T20I: 26 October 2017: South Africa v Bangladesh
- Only women's Test: 15–18 December 2024: South Africa v England
- First women's ODI: 14 May 2018: South Africa v Bangladesh
- Last women's ODI: 22 February 2026: South Africa v Pakistan
- First women's T20I: 19 May 2018: South Africa v Bangladesh
- Last women's T20I: 20 May 2018: South Africa v Bangladesh

Team information
Free State	(1989-present)
Knights	(2004-present)
- As of 15 December 2024; Source: Cricinfo

Mangaung Oval is a cricket oval in Bloemfontein, South Africa, mostly used for cricket matches. Previous names for the ground include Springbok Park, Chevrolet Park, Goodyear Park, and OUTsurance Oval. It is the home of the Knights cricket team. The stadium holds 20,000 people and opened in 1989.

== History ==
The ground hosted its first one-day international in December 1992 when South Africa cruised to an eight-wicket victory over India. In October 1999 it was accorded full Test status with the visit of the Zimbabwe team.

Early in 1994 at the ground Hansie Cronje smashed 251 with 28 fours and six sixes against the touring Australians. The ground played its part in South African Test history when, fittingly, Allan Donald, who as a Free State cricketer played many times at the ground, became the first South African to capture 300 Test wickets during the First Test against New Zealand in November 2000.

In March 2003 Feiko Kloppenburg and Klaas-Jan van Noortwijk of The Netherlands scored a century in the same match as Netherlands posted their only win in 2003 Cricket World Cup against Namibia.

On 7 March 2007, Irish vocal pop band Westlife held a concert for The Love Tour supporting their album The Love Album.

This was the stadium where Colin Ingram scored his maiden ODI century in his first international match, the first South African to score a century on his ODI debut.

Springbok Park boasts some of the best lights in the country and is regularly used for day/night matches, when the grassy banks become colourfully filled with spectators and a carnival atmosphere prevails. It is just 10 minutes walk from the city centre, with Bloemfontein coach station adjacent to the ground.

A naming rights arrangement saw the ground renamed Goodyear Park due to sponsorship by the Goodyear Tire and Rubber Company until the 2007/08 season when it was renamed the OUTsurance Oval. It has since been renamed again as Mangaung Oval.

== See also ==
- List of Test cricket grounds
