= Karl Liebenberg =

South African cricket umpire (born 1947)

Personal information
- Full name: Karl Eugene Liebenberg
- Born: 22 October 1947 (age 79); Cape Town, South Africa

Umpiring information
- Tests umpired: 9 (1992–1995)
- ODIs umpired: 33 (1992–1996)
- Source: Cricinfo, 10 July 2013

Karl Liebenberg (born 22 October 1947) is a former South African cricket umpire. At the international level, he stood in nine Test matches between 1992 and 1995 and 33 ODI games between 1992 and 1996.

== See also ==
- List of Test cricket umpires
- List of One Day International cricket umpires
