= Barry Lambson =

South African cricket umpire (born 1958)

Personal information
- Full name: Simon Barry Lambson
- Born: 28 August 1958 (age 68); Johannesburg, South Africa

Umpiring information
- Tests umpired: 5 (1992–1995)
- ODIs umpired: 35 (1992–2001)
- Source: Cricinfo, 10 July 2013

Barry Lambson (born 28 August 1958) is a South African former cricket umpire. He stood in five Test matches between 1992 and 1995 and 35 ODI games between 1992 and 2001. He umpired in 148 matches of first-class cricket and 240 matches of List A cricket in South Africa between 1985 and 2009.

== See also ==
- List of Test cricket umpires
- List of One Day International cricket umpires
