= List of South Africa One Day International cricket records =

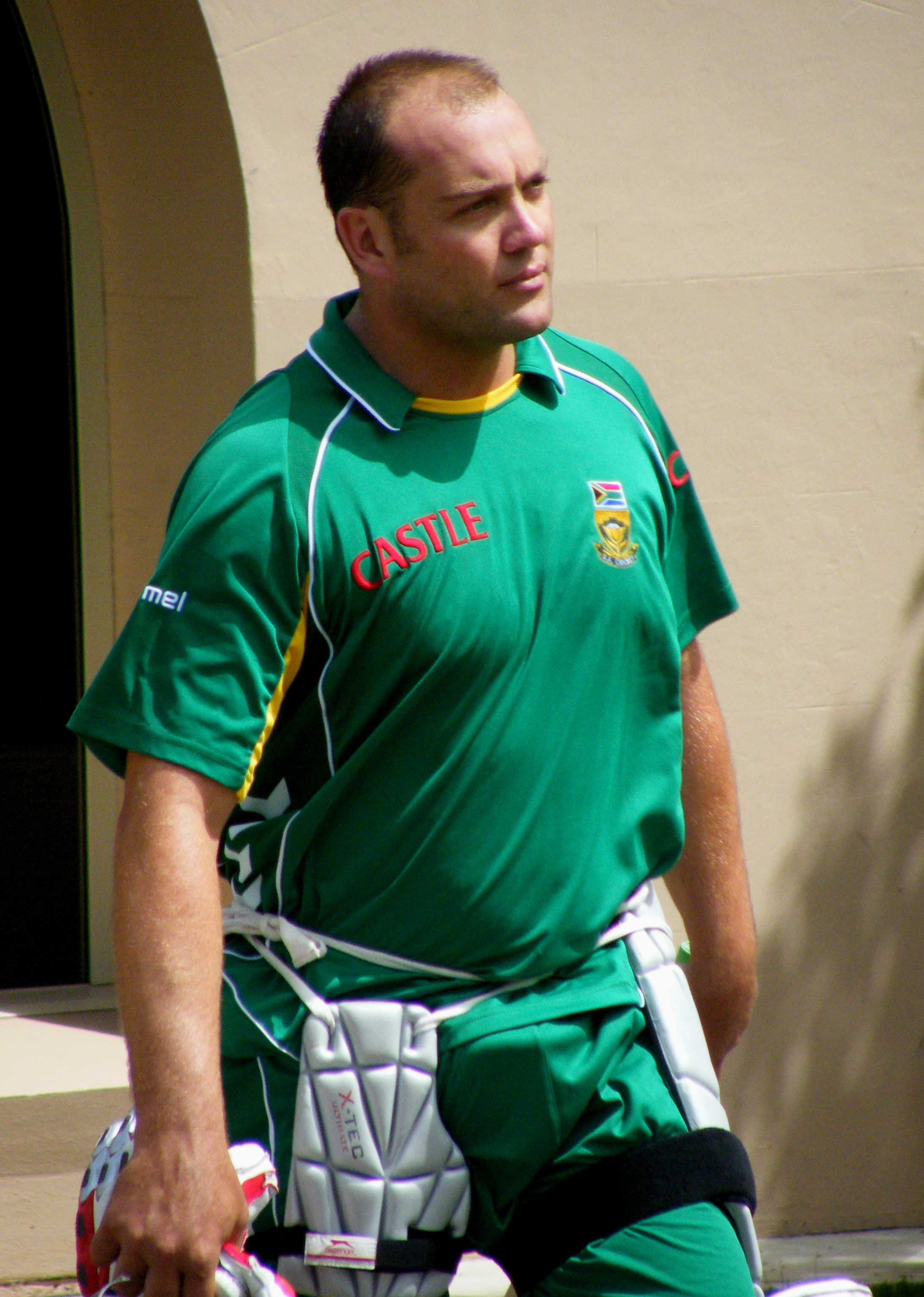
Jacques Kallis is the highest run-scorer and third-highest wicket-taker for South Africa in ODIs.

One Day International (ODI) cricket is played between international cricket teams who are Full Members of the International Cricket Council (ICC) as well as the top four Associate members. Unlike Test matches, ODIs consist of one inning per team, having a limit in the number of overs, currently 50 overs per innings – although in the past this has been 55 or 60 overs. ODI cricket is List-A cricket, so statistics and records set in ODI matches also count toward List-A records. The earliest match recognised as an ODI was played between England and Australia in January 1971; since when there have been over 4,000 ODIs played by 28 teams. This is a list of South Africa Cricket team's One Day International records. It is based on the List of One Day International cricket records but concentrates solely on records dealing with the South African cricket team. South Africa played its first-ever ODI in 1991 after its return from apartheid-induced ban. South Africa has a positive win ratio against every cricket team in the ODI format.

== Key ==
The top five records are listed for each category, except for the team wins, losses, draws and ties, all round records and the partnership records. Tied records for fifth place are also included. Explanations of the general symbols and cricketing terms used in the list are given below. Specific details are provided in each category where appropriate. All records include matches played for South Africa only, and are correct as of July 2020.

Key
| Symbol | Meaning |
|---|---|
| † | Player or umpire is currently active in ODI cricket |
| ‡ | Even took place during a Cricket World Cup |
| * | Player remained not out or partnership remained unbroken |
| ♠ | One Day International cricket record |
| Date | Starting date of the match |
| Innings | Number of innings played |
| Matches | Number of matches played |
| Opposition | The team South Africa was playing against |
| Period | The time period when the player was active in ODI cricket |
| Player | The player involved in the record |
| Venue | One Day International cricket ground where the match was played |

== Team records ==
=== Overall record ===
| Matches | Won | Lost | Tied | NR | Win % |
|---|---|---|---|---|---|
| 692 | 419 | 246 | 6 | 21 | 60.54% |
Last Updated: 8 September 2025

=== Team wins, losses, draws and ties ===
| Opponent | Matches | Won | Lost | Tied | No Result | % Won | First | Last |
|---|---|---|---|---|---|---|---|---|
Full Members
| Afghanistan | 6 | 4 | 2 | 0 | 0 | 66.66 | 2019 | 2025 |
| Australia | 113 | 57 | 52 | 3 | 1 | 52.31 | 1992 | 2026 |
| Bangladesh | 25 | 19 | 6 | 0 | 0 | 76.00 | 2002 | 2023 |
| England | 74 | 37 | 31 | 1 | 5 | 53.07 | 1992 | 2025 |
| India | 94 | 51 | 40 | 0 | 3 | 57.47 | 1991 | 2022 |
| Ireland | 11 | 8 | 2 | 0 | 1 | 72.72 | 2007 | 2021 |
| New Zealand | 74 | 42 | 27 | 0 | 5 | 56.75 | 1992 | 2025 |
| Pakistan | 87 | 52 | 34 | 0 | 1 | 59.77 | 1992 | 2025 |
| Sri Lanka | 81 | 46 | 33 | 1 | 1 | 58.12 | 1992 | 2023 |
| West Indies | 64 | 45 | 16 | 1 | 2 | 72.58 | 1992 | 2023 |
| Zimbabwe | 41 | 38 | 2 | 0 | 1 | 95.00 | 1992 | 2018 |
Associate Members
| Canada | 1 | 1 | 0 | 0 | 0 | 100.00 | 2003 | 2003 |
| Kenya | 10 | 10 | 0 | 0 | 0 | 100.00 | 1996 | 2008 |
| Netherlands | 8 | 6 | 1 | 0 | 1 | 75.00 | 1996 | 2023 |
| Scotland | 1 | 1 | 0 | 0 | 0 | 100.00 | 2007 | 2007 |
| United Arab Emirates | 2 | 2 | 0 | 0 | 0 | 100.00 | 1996 | 2015 |
| Total | 692 | 419 | 246 | 6 | 21 | 62.89 | 1991 | 2025 |
Statistics are correct as of 8 September 2025.

=== First bilateral ODI series wins ===
| Opponent | Year of first Home win | Year of first Away win |
|---|---|---|
| Afghanistan | TBD | - |
| Australia | 2000 | 2009 |
| Bangladesh | 2002 | 2008 |
| England | 1996 | 1998 |
| India | 1993 | 2015 |
| Ireland | 2016 | 2007 |
| Kenya | 2008 | YTP |
| Netherlands | 2023 | 2013 |
| New Zealand | 2000 | 1999 |
| Pakistan | 2002 | 2003 |
| Sri Lanka | 2000 | 2014 |
| West Indies | 1999 | 2001 |
| Zimbabwe | 2005 | 1995 |
Last updated: 1 July 2020

=== First ODI match wins ===
| Opponent | Home | | Away / Neutral | |
| Opponent | Venue | Year | Venue | Year |
|---|---|---|---|---|
| Afghanistan | YTP | YTP | Cardiff | 2019 ‡ |
| Australia | Johannesburg | 1994 | Sydney | 1992 ‡ |
| Bangladesh | Potchefstroom | 2002 | Dhaka | 2003 |
| Canada | East London | 2003 ‡ | YTP | YTP |
| England | Cape Town | 1996 | Johannesburg | 1996 |
| India | Cape Town | 1992 | New Delhi | 1991 |
| Ireland | Benoni | 2016 | Providence | 2007 ‡ |
| Kenya | Benoni | 2001 | Nairobi | 1996 |
| Netherlands | Benoni | 2023 | Rawalpindi | 1996 ‡ |
| New Zealand | Cape Town | 1994 | Perth | 1994 |
| Pakistan | Johannesburg | 1994 | Brisbane | 1992 ‡ |
| Scotland | YTP | YTP | Basseterre | 2007 ‡ |
| Sri Lanka | Port Elizabeth | 1994 | Colombo (RPS) | 1993 |
| United Arab Emirates | YTP | YTP | Rawalpindi | 1996 ‡ |
| West Indies | Port Elizabeth | 1993 | Christchurch | 1992 ‡ |
| Zimbabwe | Centurion | 1997 | Canberra | 1992 ‡ |
Last updated: 1 July 2020

=== Winning every match in a series ===
In a bilateral series winning all matches is referred to as whitewash. The first such event occurred when West Indies toured England in 1976. South Africa have recorded 20 such series victories, the highest ever in ODI history (shared with Pakistan).

| Opposition | Matches | Host | Season |
|---|---|---|---|
| Zimbabwe | 3 | Zimbabwe | 2001/02 |
| Bangladesh | 3 | South Africa | 2002/03 |
| Zimbabwe | 3 | South Africa | 2004/05 |
| West Indies | 5 | West Indies | 2005 |
| Zimbabwe | 3 | South Africa | 2006/07 |
| India | 4 | South Africa | 2006/07 |
| Zimbabwe | 3 | Zimbabwe | 2007 |
| West Indies | 5 | South Africa | 2007/08 |
| Bangladesh | 3 | Bangladesh | 2007/08 |
| West Indies | 5 | West Indies | 2010 |
| Zimbabwe | 3 | South Africa | 2010/11 |
| New Zealand | 3 | New Zealand | 2011/12 |
| Zimbabwe | 3 | Zimbabwe | 2014 |
| Australia | 5 | South Africa | 2016/17 |
| Sri Lanka | 5 | South Africa | 2016/17 |
| Bangladesh | 3 | South Africa | 2017/18 |
| Zimbabwe | 3 | South Africa | 2018/19 |
| Sri Lanka | 5 | South Africa | 2018/19 |
| Australia | 3 | South Africa | 2019/20 |
| India | 3 | South Africa | 2022 |
Last updated: 1 July 2020

=== Losing every match in a series ===
South Africa has also suffered such whitewash three times.

| Opposition | Matches | Host | Season |
|---|---|---|---|
| West Indies | 3 | West Indies | 1991/92 |
| Sri Lanka | 5 | Sri Lanka | 2004 |
| Pakistan | 3 | South Africa | 2024/25 |
Last updated: 1 July 2020

=== Team scoring records ===
==== Most runs in an innings ====
The highest innings total scored in ODIs came in the match between England and Australia in June 2018. Playing in the third ODI at Trent Bridge in Nottingham, the hosts posted a total of 481/6. The second ODI against West Indies in January 2015 saw South Africa set their highest innings total of 439/2. South Africa are the only team to have recorded more than 400 runs in an innings on six occasions. South Africa also posted the highest total (428) in the history of Cricket World Cup on 7 October 2023 against Sri Lanka at the Arun Jaitley Cricket Stadium, Delhi.

| Rank | Score | Opposition | Venue | Date | Scorecard |
|---|---|---|---|---|---|
| 1 | 439/2 | West Indies | The Wanderers Stadium, Johannesburg, South Africa | 18 January 2015 | Scorecard |
| 2 | 438/9 | Australia | The Wanderers Stadium, Johannesburg, South Africa | 12 March 2006 | Scorecard |
| 3 | 438/4 | India | Wankhede Stadium, Mumbai, India | 25 October 2015 | Scorecard |
| 4 | 428/5 | Sri Lanka | Arun Jaitley Cricket Stadium, Delhi, India | 7 October 2023 | Scorecard |
| 5 | 418/5 | Zimbabwe | North West Cricket Stadium, Potchefstroom, South Africa | 20 September 2006 | Scorecard |
Last updated: 7 October 2023

==== Fewest runs in an innings ====
The lowest innings total scored in ODIs has been scored twice. Zimbabwe were dismissed for 35 by Sri Lanka during the third ODI in Sri Lanka's tour of Zimbabwe in April 2004 and USA were dismissed for same score by Nepal in the sixth ODI of the 2020 ICC Cricket World League 2 in Nepal in February 2020. The lowest score in ODI history for South Africa is 69 scored against Australia in the 1993 ODI Series against Australia at Sydney Cricket Ground, Sydney.

| Rank | Score | Opposition | Venue | Date | Scorecard |
|---|---|---|---|---|---|
| 1 | 69 | Australia | Sydney Cricket Ground, Sydney, Australia | 14 December 1993 | Scorecard |
| 2 | 72 | England | Rose Bowl, Southampton, England | 7 September 2025 | Scorecard |
| 3 | 83 | India | Eden Gardens, Kolkata, India | 5 November 2023 | Scorecard |
| 3 | 83 | England | Trent Bridge, Nottingham, England | 26 August 2008 | Scorecard |
| 3 | 83 | England | Old Trafford, Manchester, England | 22 July 2022 | Scorecard |
Last updated: 7 September 2025

==== Most runs conceded an innings ====
The fifth ODI of March 2006 series at Wanderers Stadium, Johannesburg saw Australia concede their highest innings total of 434/4 against South Africa.

| Rank | Score | Opposition | Venue | Date | Scorecard |
|---|---|---|---|---|---|
| 1 | 434/4 | Australia | Wanderers Stadium, Johannesburg, South Africa | 12 March 2006 | Scorecard |
| 2 | 431/2 | Australia | Great Barrier Reef Arena, Mackay, Australia | 24 August 2025 | Scorecard |
| 3 | 414/5 | England | Rose Bowl, Southampton, England | 7 September 2025 | Scorecard |
| 4 | 401/3 | India | Captain Roop Singh Stadium, Gwalior, India | 24 February 2010 | Scorecard |
| 5 | 399/9 | England | Goodyear Park, Bloemfontein, South Africa | 3 February 2016 | Scorecard |
Last updated: 1 July 2020

==== Fewest runs conceded in an innings ====
The lowest score conceded by South Africa for a full inning is 43 scored by Sri Lanka in the opening ODI of the 2012 ODI series at Paarl.

| Rank | Score | Opposition | Venue | Date | Scorecard |
|---|---|---|---|---|---|
| 1 | 43 | Sri Lanka | Boland Park, Paarl, South Africa | 11 January 2012 | Scorecard |
| 2 | 54 | West Indies | Sahara Park Newlands, Cape Town, South Africa | 25 January 2004 | Scorecard |
| 3 | 78 | Bangladesh | Shere-e-Bangla Stadium, Mirpur, Bangladesh | 19 March 2011 ‡ | Scorecard |
| 3 | 78 | Zimbabwe | Goodyear Park, Bloemfontein, South Africa | 3 October 2018 | Scorecard |
| 5 | 89 | Pakistan | Punjab Cricket Association Stadium, Mohali, India | 27 October 2006 | Scorecard |
Last updated: 1 July 2020

==== Most runs aggregate in a match ====
The highest match aggregate scored in ODIs came in the match between South Africa and Australia in the fifth ODI of March 2006 series at Wanderers Stadium, Johannesburg when South Africa scored 438/9 in response to Australia's 434/4.

| Rank | Aggregate | Scores | Venue | Date | Scorecard |
|---|---|---|---|---|---|
| 1 | 872/13 | Australia (434/4) v South Africa (438/9) | New Wanderers Stadium, Johannesburg, South Africa | 12 March 2006 | Scorecard |
| 2 | 754/15 | South Africa (428/5) v Sri Lanka (326) | Arun Jaitley Cricket Stadium, Delhi, India | 7 October 2023 | Scorecard |
| 3 | 743/12 | Australia (371/6) v South Africa (372/6) | Sahara Stadium, Kingsmead, Durban, South Africa | 5 October 2016 | Scorecard |
| 4 | 730/9 | South Africa (439/2) v West Indies (291/7) | New Wanderers Stadium, Johannesburg, South Africa | 18 January 2015 | Scorecard |
| 5 | 717/11 | India (358/5) v South Africa (359/6) | Shaheed Veer Narayan Singh International Cricket Stadium, Raipur, India | 3 December 2025 | Scorecard |
Last updated: 3 December 2025

==== Fewest runs aggregate in a match ====
The lowest match aggregate in ODIs is 71 when USA were dismissed for 35 by Nepal in the sixth ODI of the 2020 ICC Cricket World League 2 in Nepal in February 2020. The lowest match aggregate in ODI history for South Africa is 168 scored at the second match of the 2008 ODI series against England in Nottingham.

| Rank | Aggregate | Scores | Venue | Date | Scorecard |
|---|---|---|---|---|---|
| 1 | 168/10 | South Africa (83) v England (85/0) | Trent Bridge, Nottingham, England | 26 August 2008 | Scorecard |
| 2 | 187/11 | Bangladesh (93) v South Africa (94/1) | Edgbaston, Birmingham, England | 12 September 2004 | Scorecard |
| 3 | 211/15 | Sri Lanka (105) v South Africa (106/5) | Goodyear Park, Bloemfontein, South Africa | 19 April 1998 | Scorecard |
| 4 | 213/12 | South Africa (106) v Australia (107/2) | Sydney Cricket Ground, Sydney, Australia | 22 January 2002 | Scorecard |
| 5 | 217/10 | Bangladesh (108) v South Africa (109/0) | Goodyear Park, Bloemfontein, South Africa | 22 February 2003 ‡ | Scorecard |
Last updated: 1 July 2020

=== Result records ===
An ODI match is won when one side has scored more runs than the total runs scored by the opposing side during their innings. If both sides have completed both their allocated innings and the side that fielded last has the higher aggregate of runs, it is known as a win by runs. This indicates the number of runs that they had scored more than the opposing side. If the side batting last wins the match, it is known as a win by wickets, indicating the number of wickets that were still to fall.

==== Greatest win margins (by runs) ====
The greatest winning margin by runs in ODIs was England's victory over South Africa by 342 runs in the third and final ODI of South Africa's 2025 tour of England. The largest victory recorded by South Africa was during the Zimbabwe's tour of South Africa in 2010 by 272 runs.

| Rank | Margin | Target | Opposition | Venue | Date |
|---|---|---|---|---|---|
| 1 | 272 runs | 400 | Zimbabwe | Willowmoore Park, Benoni, South Africa | 22 October 2010 |
| 2 | 258 runs | 302 | Sri Lanka | Boland Park, Paarl, South Africa | 12 January 2012 |
| 3 | 257 runs | 409 | West Indies | Sydney Cricket Ground, Sydney, Australia | 27 February 2015 ‡ |
| 4 | 231 runs | 352 | Netherlands | Punjab Cricket Association Stadium, Mohali, India | 3 March 2011 ‡ |
| 5 | 229 runs | 400 | England | Wankhede Stadium, Mumbai, India | 21 October 2023 ‡ |
Last updated: 1 July 2020

==== Greatest win margins (by balls remaining) ====
The greatest winning margin by balls remaining in ODIs was England's victory over Canada by 8 wickets with 277 balls remaining in the 1979 Cricket World Cup. The largest victory recorded by South Africa is during the 2003 Cricket World Cup when they won by 10 wickets with 228 balls remaining against Bangladesh in Bloemfontein.

| Rank | Balls remaining | Margin | Opposition | Venue | Date |
|---|---|---|---|---|---|
| 1 | 228 | 10 wickets | Bangladesh | Goodyear Park, Bloemfontein, South Africa | 22 February 2003 ‡ |
| 2 | 216 | 10 wickets | Pakistan | Sahara Park Newlands, Cape Town, South Africa | 11 February 2007 |
| 3 | 193 | 9 wickets | Bangladesh | Edgbaston, Birmingham, England | 12 September 2004 |
| 4 | 192 | 9 wickets | Sri Lanka | Sydney Cricket Ground, Sydney, Australia | 18 March 2015 ‡ |
| 5 | 184 | 9 wickets | England | Kensington Oval, Bridgetown, Barbados | 17 April 2007 ‡ |
Last updated: 1 July 2020

==== Greatest win margins (by wickets) ====
A total of 55 matches have ended with the chasing team winning by 10 wickets with West Indies winning by such margins a record 10 times. South Africa have won an ODI match by this margin on seven occasions.

| Rank | Margin | Opposition | Most recent venue | Date |
|---|---|---|---|---|
| 1 | 10 wickets | India | Sharjah Cricket Stadium, Sharjah, United Arab Emirates | 22 March 2000 |
| 1 | 10 wickets | Bangladesh | Willowmoore Park, Benoni, South Africa | 6 October 2002 |
| 1 | 10 wickets | Kenya | North West Cricket Stadium, Potchefstroom, South Africa | 12 February 2003 ‡ |
| 1 | 10 wickets | Bangladesh | Goodyear Park, Bloemfontein, South Africa | 22 February 2003 ‡ |
| 1 | 10 wickets | India | Eden Gardens, Kolkata, India | 25 November 2005 |
| 1 | 10 wickets | Pakistan | Sahara Park Newlands, Cape Town, South Africa | 11 February 2007 |
| 1 | 10 wickets | Bangladesh | De Beers Diamond Oval, Kimberley, South Africa | 15 October 2017 |
Last updated: 3 December 2017

==== Highest successful run chases ====
South Africa holds the record for the highest successful run chase which they achieved when they scored 438/9 in response to Australia's 434/9.

| Rank | Score | Target | Opposition | Venue | Date |
|---|---|---|---|---|---|
| 1 | 438/9 | 435 | Australia | New Wanderers Stadium, Johannesburg, South Africa | 12 March 2006 |
| 2 | 372/6 | 372 | Australia | Sahara Stadium, Kingsmead, Durban, South Africa | 5 October 2016 |
| 3 | 362/6 | 359 | India | Shaheed Veer Narayan Singh International Cricket Stadium, Raipur, India | 3 December 2025 |
| 4 | 347/5 | 343 | England | Mangaung Oval, Bloemfontein, South Africa | 29 January 2023 |
| 5 | 328/3 | 328 | Australia | Harare Sports Club, Harare, Zimbabwe | 27 August 2014 |
Last updated: 3 December 2025

==== Narrowest win margins (by runs) ====
The narrowest run margin victory is by 1 run which has been achieved in 31 ODI's with Australia winning such games a record 6 times. South Africa has achieved any victory by 1 run on four occasions.

| Rank | Margin | Opposition | Venue | Date |
|---|---|---|---|---|
| 1 | 1 run | New Zealand | Bellerive Oval, Hobart, Australia | 11 December 1997 |
| 1 | 1 run | England | Sahara Park Newlands, Cape Town, South Africa | 26 January 2000 |
| 1 | 1 run | West Indies | Kensington Oval, Bridgetown, Barbados | 11 May 2005 |
| 1 | 1 run | Pakistan | Sharjah Cricket Stadium, Sharjah, United Arab Emirates | 30 October 2013 |
| 5 | 2 runs | New Zealand | Brisbane Cricket Ground, Brisbane, Australia | 9 January 1998 |
| 5 | 2 runs | Pakistan | Dubai International Cricket Stadium, Dubai, United Arab Emirates | 2 November 2010 |
Last updated: 1 July 2020

==== Narrowest win margins (by balls remaining) ====
The narrowest winning margin by balls remaining in ODIs is by winning of the last ball which has been achieved 36 times with South Africa winning seven times.

| Balls remaining | Margin | Opposition | Venue | Date |
|---|---|---|---|---|
| 0 balls | 2 wickets | West Indies | New Wanderers Stadium, Johannesburg, South Africa | 22 January 1999 |
| 0 balls | 2 wickets | New Zealand | McLean Park, Napier, NZ | 26 March 1999 |
| 0 balls | 3 wickets | New Zealand | Sahara Park Newlands, Cape Town, RSA | 4 November 2000 |
| 0 balls | 2 wickets | West Indies | Sinhalese Sports Club Ground, Colombo, Sri Lanka | 13 September 2002 |
| 0 balls | 2 wickets | New Zealand | Sahara Stadium, Kingsmead, Durban, RSA | 25 November 2007 |
| 0 balls | 7 wickets | West Indies | Windsor Park, Roseau, Dominica | 30 May 2010 |
| 0 balls | 1 wicket | New Zealand | North West Cricket Stadium, Potchefstroom, RSA | 25 January 2013 |
Last updated: 1 July 2020

==== Narrowest win margins (by wickets) ====
The narrowest margin of victory by wickets is 1 wicket which has settled 55 such ODIs. Both West Indies and New Zealand have recorded such victory on eight occasions. South Africa has won the match by a margin of one wicket on five occasions.

| Margin | Opposition | Venue | Date |
|---|---|---|---|
| 1 wicket | Australia | New Wanderers Stadium, Johannesburg, South Africa | 12 March 2006 |
| 1 wicket | Sri Lanka | Providence Stadium, Providence, West Indies | 28 March 2007 ‡ |
| 1 wicket | West Indies | Queen's Park Oval, Port of Spain, Trinidad & Tobago | 3 June 2010 |
| 1 wicket | New Zealand | North West Cricket Stadium, Potchefstroom, South Africa | 25 January 2013 |
| 1 wicket | England | New Wanderers Stadium, Johannesburg, South Africa | 12 February 2016 |
| 1 wicket | Pakistan | M.A. Chidambaram Stadium, Chennai, India | 27 October 2023 ‡ |
Last updated: 28 October 2023

==== Greatest loss margins (by runs) ====
| Rank | Margin | Opposition | Venue | Date |
|---|---|---|---|---|
| 1 | 342 runs | England | Rose Bowl, Southampton, England | 7 September 2025 |
| 2 | 276 runs | Australia | Great Barrier Reef Arena, Mackay, Australia | 24 August 2025 |
| 3 | 243 runs | India | Eden Gardens, Kolkata, India | 5 November 2023 |
| 4 | 182 runs | Pakistan | Axxess DSL St. Georges, Port Elizabeth, South Africa | 11 December 2002 |
| 5 | 180 runs | Sri Lanka | Ranasinghe Premadasa Stadium, Colombo, Sri Lanka | 20 July 2013 |
Last updated: 7 September 2025

==== Greatest loss margins (by balls remaining) ====
The greatest winning margin by balls remaining in ODIs was England's victory over Canada by 8 wickets with 277 balls remaining in the 1979 Cricket World Cup. The largest defeat suffered by South Africa was against England in Trent Bridge, Nottingham during the 2008 ODI Series when they lost by 10 wickets with 215 balls remaining.

| Rank | Balls remaining | Margin | Opposition | Venue | Date |
|---|---|---|---|---|---|
| 1 | 215 | 10 wickets | England | Trent Bridge, Nottingham, England | 26 August 2008 |
| 2 | 188 | 8 wickets | Australia | Sydney Cricket Ground, Sydney, Australia | 22 January 2002 |
| 3 | 178 | 7 wickets | England | Lord's, London, England | 12 June 2003 |
| 4 | 177 | 9 wickets | India | Centurion Park, Centurion, South Africa | 4 February 2018 |
| 5 | 164 | 8 wickets | India | Gymkhana Club Ground, Nairobi, Kenya | 26 September 1999 |
Last updated: 1 July 2020

==== Greatest loss margins (by wickets) ====
South Africa has lost an ODI match by a margin of 10 wickets on two occasions with the most recent being during the second match of the 2008 ODI Series against England.

| Margins | Opposition | Most recent venue | Date |
|---|---|---|---|
| 10 wickets | West Indies | Queen's Park Oval, Port of Spain, Trinidad & Tobago | 11 April 1992 |
| 10 wickets | England | Trent Bridge, Nottingham, England | 26 August 2008 |
| 9 wickets | West Indies | Goodyear Park, Bloemfontein, South Africa | 23 February 1993 |
| 9 wickets | England | Goodyear Park, Bloemfontein, South Africa | 23 January 2000 |
| 9 wickets | New Zealand | New Wanderers Stadium, Johannesburg, South Africa | 16 February 2003 ‡ |
| 9 wickets | Bangladesh | Zohur Ahmed Chowdhury Stadium, Chittagong, Bangladesh | 15 July 2015 |
| 9 wickets | India | Centurion Park, Centurion, South Africa | 4 February 2018 |
Last updated: 1 July 2020

==== Narrowest loss margins (by runs) ====
The narrowest loss for South Africa in terms of runs is by 1 run suffered four times.

| Margin | Opposition | Venue | Date |
|---|---|---|---|
| 1 run | Australia | Goodyear Park, Bloemfontein, South Africa | 8 April 1994 |
| 1 run | India | Sawai Mansingh Stadium, Jaipur, India | 21 February 2010 |
| 1 run | India | New Wanderers Stadium, Johannesburg, South Africa | 15 January 2011 |
| 1 run | Pakistan | Axxess DSL St. Georges, Port Elizabeth, South Africa | 27 November 2013 |
| 2 runs | India | Eden Gardens, Kolkata, India | 24 November 1993 |
| 2 runs | New Zealand | Eden Park, Auckland, New Zealand | 29 February 2004 |
| 2 runs | England | Rose Bowl, Southampton, England | 27 May 2017 |
Last updated: 1 July 2020

==== Narrowest loss margins (by balls remaining) ====
The narrowest winning margin by balls remaining in ODIs is by winning of the last ball which has been achieved 36 times with both South Africa winning seven times. South Africa has also suffered loss by this margin on two occasions.

| Balls remaining | Margin | Opposition | Venue | Date |
|---|---|---|---|---|
| 0 balls | 2 wickets | Zimbabwe | Sahara Stadium, Kingsmead, Durban, South Africa | 2 February 2000 |
| 0 balls | 3 wickets | West Indies | Sabina Park, Kingston, Jamaica | 28 April 2001 |
| 0 balls | 3 wickets | Pakistan | Centurion Park, Centurion, South Africa | 2 April 2021 |
| 1 balls | 3 wickets | Sri Lanka | Basin Reserve, Wellington, New Zealand | 2 March 1992 ‡ |
| 1 balls | 3 wickets | England | Melbourne Cricket Ground, Melbourne, Australia | 12 March 1992 ‡ |
| 1 balls | 4 wickets | India | Reliance Stadium, Vadodara, India | 17 March 2000 |
| 1 balls | 1 wicket | Pakistan | Sheikh Zayed Cricket Stadium, Abu Dhabi, United Arab Emirates | 31 October 2010 |
| 1 balls | 1 wicket | Pakistan | Dubai International Cricket Stadium, Dubai, United Arab Emirates | 5 November 2010 |
| 1 balls | 2 wickets | Sri Lanka | New Wanderers Stadium, Johannesburg, South Africa | 22 January 2012 |
| 1 balls | 4 wickets | New Zealand | Eden Park, Auckland, New Zealand | 24 March 2015 |
Last updated: 1 July 2020

==== Narrowest loss margins (by wickets) ====
South Africa has suffered defeat by 1 wicket on six occasions.

| Margin | Opposition | Venue | Date |
|---|---|---|---|
| 1 wicket | Australia | Sahara Stadium, Kingsmead, Durban, South Africa | 10 March 2006 |
| 1 wicket | Pakistan | Sheikh Zayed Cricket Stadium, Abu Dhabi, United Arab Emirates | 31 October 2010 |
| 1 wicket | Pakistan | Dubai International Cricket Stadium, Dubai, United Arab Emirates | 5 November 2010 |
| 1 wicket | New Zealand | Boland Park, Paarl, RSA | 19 January 2013 |
| 1 wicket | West Indies | Axxess DSL St. Georges, Port Elizabeth, South Africa | 25 January 2015 |
Last updated: 1 July 2020

==== Tied matches ====
A tie can occur when the scores of both teams are equal after the play, provided that the side batting last has completed their innings. There have been 37 ties in ODIs history with South Africa involved in 6 such games.

| Opposition | Venue | Date |
|---|---|---|
| Australia | Edgbaston, Birmingham, England | 17 June 1999 ‡ |
| Australia | Docklands Stadium, Melbourne, Australia | 18 August 2000 |
| Australia | North West Cricket Stadium, Potchefstroom, South Africa | 27 March 2002 |
| Sri Lanka | Sahara Stadium, Kingsmead, Durban, South Africa | 3 March 2003 ‡ |
| England | Goodyear Park, Bloemfontein, South Africa | 2 February 2005 |
| West Indies | SWALEC Stadium, Cardiff, England | 14 June 2013 |
Last updated: 3 December 2017

== Individual records ==
=== Batting records ===
==== Most career runs ====
A run is the basic means of scoring in cricket. A run is scored when the batsman hits the ball with his bat and with his partner runs the length of 22 yards (20 m) of the pitch. India's Sachin Tendulkar has scored the most runs in ODIs with 18,246. Second is Kumar Sangakkara of Sri Lanka with 14,234 ahead of Ricky Ponting from Australia in third with 13,704. Jacques Kallis is the leading South African on this list.

| Rank | Runs | Player | Matches | Innings | Period |
|---|---|---|---|---|---|
| 1 | 11,550 | Jacques Kallis | 323 | 309 | 1996–2014 |
| 2 | 9,427 | AB de Villiers | 223 | 213 | 2005–2018 |
| 3 | 8,113 | Hashim Amla | 181 | 178 | 2008–2019 |
| 4 | 8,094 | Herschelle Gibbs | 248 | 240 | 1996–2010 |
| 5 | 7,017 | Quinton de Kock† | 160 | 160 | 2013–2025 |
| 6 | 6,989 | Graeme Smith | 196 | 193 | 2002–2013 |
| 7 | 6,798 | Gary Kirsten | 185 | 185 | 1993–2003 |
| 8 | 5,935 | Jonty Rhodes | 245 | 220 | 1992–2003 |
| 9 | 5,565 | Hansie Cronje | 188 | 175 | 1992–2000 |
| 10 | 5,507 | Faf du Plessis | 143 | 136 | 2011–2019 |
Last updated: 3 December 2025

==== Fastest runs getter ====
| Runs | Batsman | Match | Innings | Record Date | Reference |
|---|---|---|---|---|---|
| 1,000 | Quinton de Kock | 21 | 21 | 19 August 2014 | |
| 1,000 | Rassie van der Dussen | 21 | 21 | 2 September 2021 | |
| 2,000 | Hashim Amla | 41 | 40 ♠ | 21 January 2011 | |
| 3,000 | Hashim Amla | 59 | 57 ♠ | 28 August 2012 | |
| 4,000 | Hashim Amla | 84 | 81 ♠ | 8 December 2013 | |
| 5,000 | Hashim Amla | 104 | 101 ♠ | 16 January 2015 | |
| 6,000 | Hashim Amla | 126 | 123 ♠ | 25 October 2015 | |
| 7,000 | Hashim Amla | 153 | 150 ♠ | 29 May 2017 | |
| 8,000 | Hashim Amla | 179 | 176 | 19 June 2019 ‡ | |
| 9,000 | AB de Villiers | 214 | 205 | 25 February 2017 | |
| 10,000 | Jacques Kallis | 286 | 272 | 23 January 2009 | |
| 11,000 | Jacques Kallis | 307 | 293 | 8 November 2010 | |

==== Most runs in each batting position ====
| Batting position | Batsman | Innings | Runs | Average | Career Span | Ref |
|---|---|---|---|---|---|---|
| Opener | Hashim Amla | 175 | 8,083 | 49.89 | 2008–2019 | |
| Number 3 | Jacques Kallis | 197 | 7,758 | 46.45 | 1997–2014 | |
| Number 4 | AB de Villiers | 125 | 5,736 | 53.11 | 2006–2018 | |
| Number 5 | Jonty Rhodes | 90 | 2,734 | 40.80 | 1992–2003 | |
| Number 6 | David Miller† | 95 | 2,776 | 38.55 | 2010–2025 | |
| Number 7 | Shaun Pollock | 79 | 1,445 | 26.75 | 1996–2008 | |
| Number 8 | Shaun Pollock | 70 | 1,062 | 22.12 | 1996–2008 | |
| Number 9 | Lance Klusener | 12 | 341 | 113.66 | 1998–2004 | |
| Number 10 | Morne Morkel | 29 | 147 | 9.80 | 2008–2018 | |
| Number 11 | Makhaya Ntini | 31 | 136 | 11.33 | 1998–2009 | |
Last updated: 22 February 2025.

==== Most runs against each opponent ====
| Opponent | Runs | Player | Matches | Innings | Period | Ref |
|---|---|---|---|---|---|---|
| Afghanistan | 169 | Aiden Markram† | 6 | 5 | 2019–2025 | |
| Australia | 1,639 | Jacques Kallis | 47 | 47 | 1997–2011 | |
| Bangladesh | 602 | Quinton de Kock | 10 | 10 | 2015–2023 | |
| Canada | 80 | Boeta Dippenaar | 1 | 1 | 2003–2003 | |
| England | 1,054 | Jacques Kallis | 38 | 38 | 1996–2011 | |
| India | 1,535 | Jacques Kallis | 37 | 34 | 1996–2013 | |
| Ireland | 261 | Janneman Malan† | 3 | 2 | 2021–2021 | |
| Kenya | 410 | Herschelle Gibbs | 9 | 9 | 1996–2008 | |
| Netherlands | 227 | Aiden Markram† | 3 | 3 | 2023–2023 | |
| New Zealand | 1,449 | Jacques Kallis | 45 | 44 | 1996–2012 | |
| Pakistan | 1,423 | AB de Villiers | 32 | 31 | 2006–2017 | |
| Scotland | 91 | Graeme Smith | 1 | 1 | 2007–2007 | |
| Sri Lanka | 1,434 | Jacques Kallis | 36 | 36 | 1998–2014 | |
| United Arab Emirates | 188 | Gary Kirsten | 1 | 1 | 1996–1996 | |
| West Indies | 1,666 | Jacques Kallis | 40 | 40 | 1998–2011 | |
| Zimbabwe | 735 | Herschelle Gibbs | 16 | 16 | 1999–2007 | |
Last updated: 22 February 2025

==== Highest individual score ====
The fourth ODI of the Sri Lanka's tour of India in 2014 saw Rohit Sharma score the highest Individual score. Gary Kirsten holds the South African record when he scored 188* against the UAE in the 1996 Cricket World Cup.

| Rank | Runs | Player | Opposition | Venue | Date |
|---|---|---|---|---|---|
| 1 | 188* | Gary Kirsten | United Arab Emirates | Rawalpindi Cricket Stadium, Rawalpindi, Pakistan | 16 February 1996 ‡ |
| 2 | 185 | Faf du Plessis | Sri Lanka | Sahara Park Newlands, Cape Town, South Africa | 7 February 2017 |
| 3 | 178 | Quinton de Kock† | Australia | Centurion Park, Centurion, South Africa | 30 September 2016 |
| 4 | 177* | Janneman Malan | Ireland | The Village, Dublin, Ireland | 16 July 2021 |
| 5 | 176 | AB de Villiers | Bangladesh | Boland Park, Paarl, South Africa | 18 October 2017 |
Last updated: 16 July 2021

==== Highest individual score – progression of record ====
| Runs | Player | Opponent | Venue | Season |
|---|---|---|---|---|
| 50 | Kepler Wessels | India | Eden Gardens, Kolkata, India | 1991–92 |
| 71 | Kepler Wessels | India | Captain Roop Singh Stadium, Gwalior, India | 1991–92 |
| 90 | Kepler Wessels | India | Jawaharlal Nehru Stadium, New Delhi, India | 1991–92 |
| 90 | Peter Kirsten | New Zealand | Eden Park, Auckland, New Zealand | 1991–92 ‡ |
| 108 | Andrew Hudson | India | Goodyear Park, Bloemfontein, South Africa | 1992 |
| 112* | Gary Kirsten | Australia | Melbourne Cricket Ground, Melbourne, Australia | 1993–94 |
| 112 | Hansie Cronje | Australia | New Wanderers Stadium, Johannesburg, South Africa | 1993–94 |
| 169* | David Callaghan | New Zealand | Centurion Park, Centurion, South Africa | 1994–95 |
| 188* | Gary Kirsten | United Arab Emirates | Rawalpindi Cricket Stadium, Rawalpindi, Pakistan | 1995–96 ‡ |
Last updated: 1 July 2020

==== Highest score against each opponent ====
| Opposition | Runs | Player | Venue | Date | Ref |
|---|---|---|---|---|---|
| Afghanistan | 103 | Ryan Rickelton | National Stadium, Karachi, Pakistan | 21 February 2025 | |
| Australia | 178 | Quinton de Kock | Centurion Park, Centurion, South Africa | 30 September 2016 | |
| Bangladesh | 176 | AB de Villiers | Boland Park, Paarl, South Africa | 18 October 2017 | |
| Canada | 80 | Boeta Dippenaar | Buffalo Park, East London, South Africa | 27 February 2003 ‡ | |
| England | 150 | Hashim Amla | Rose Bowl, Southampton, England | 28 August 2012 | |
| India | 135 | Quinton de Kock | Wanderers Stadium, Johannesburg, South Africa | 5 December 2013 | |
| Ireland | 177* | Janneman Malan | Malahide Cricket Club Ground, Dublin, Ireland | 16 July 2021 | |
| Kenya | 131* | Neil McKenzie | Newlands Cricket Ground, Cape Town, South Africa | 22 October 2001 | |
| Netherlands | 175 | Aiden Markram† | The Wanderers Stadium, Johannesburg, South Africa | 2 March 2023 | |
| New Zealand | 169* | Dave Callaghan | Centurion Park, Centurion, South Africa | 11 December 1994 | |
| Pakistan | 128 | AB de Villiers | Wanderers Stadium, Johannesburg, South Africa | 17 March 2013 | |
| Scotland | 91 | Graeme Smith | Warner Park, Basseterre, St Kitts & Nevis | 20 March 2007 ‡ | |
| Sri Lanka | 185 | Faf du Plessis | Newlands Cricket Ground, Cape Town, South Africa | 7 February 2017 | |
| United Arab Emirates | 188* | Gary Kirsten | Rawalpindi Cricket Stadium, Rawalpindi, Pakistan | 16 February 1996 ‡ | |
| West Indies | 162* | AB de Villiers | Sydney Cricket Ground, Sydney, Australia | 27 February 2015 ‡ | |
| Zimbabwe | 147* | Mark Boucher | North West Cricket Stadium, Potchefstroom, South Africa | 20 September 2006 | |
Last updated: 22 February 2025.

==== Highest scores at each batting position ====
| Batting position | Player | Score | Opponent | Venue | Date |
| Opener | Gary Kirsten | 188* | United Arab Emirates | Rawalpindi Cricket Stadium, Rawalpindi, Pakistan | 16 February 1996 |
| Number 3 | Faf du Plessis | 185 | Sri Lanka | Newlands Cricket Ground, Cape Town, South Africa | 7 February 2017 |
| Number 4 | AB de Villiers | 176 | Sri Lanka | Boland Park, Paarl, South Africa | 18 October 2017 |
| Number 5 | Heinrich Klaasen | 174 | Australia | Centurion Park, Centurion, South Africa | 15 September 2023 |
| Number 6 | David Miller | 118* | Australia | Kingsmead Cricket Ground, Durban, South Africa | 5 October 2016 |
| Number 7 | Justin Kemp | 100* | India | Newlands Cricket Ground, Cape Town, South Africa | 26 November 2006 |
| Number 8 | Lance Klusener | 83 | Australia | Wanderers Stadium, Johannesburg, South Africa | 22 March 2002 |
| Number 9 | Dale Steyn | 60 | Zimbabwe | Mangaung Oval, Bloemfontein South Africa | 3 October 2018 |
| Number 10 | Rory Kleinveldt | 43 | England | The Oval, London, England | 19 June 2013 |
| Number 11 | Makhaya Ntini | 42* | New Zealand | McLean Park, Napier, New Zealand | 2 March 2004 |
Last updated: 29 January 2026

==== Highest career average ====
A batsman's batting average is the total number of runs they have scored divided by the number of times they have been dismissed.

| Rank | Average | Player | Innings | Runs | Not out | Period |
|---|---|---|---|---|---|---|
| 1 | 54.17 | AB de Villiers | 213 | 9,427 | 39 | 2005–2018 |
| 2 | 50.13 | Rassie van der Dussen† | 65 | 2,657 | 12 | 2019–2025 |
| 3 | 49.46 | Hashim Amla | 178 | 8,113 | 14 | 2008–2019 |
| 4 | 47.90 | Janneman Malan† | 22 | 958 | 2 | 2020–2022 |
| 5 | 47.47 | Faf du Plessis | 136 | 5,507 | 20 | 2011–2019 |
Qualification: 20 innings. Last updated: 2 March 2025

==== Highest Average in each batting position ====
| Batting position | Batsman | Innings | Runs | Average | Career Span | Ref |
|---|---|---|---|---|---|---|
| Opener | Boeta Dippenaar | 40 | 1,708 | 50.23 | 1999–2006 | |
| Number 3 | Faf du Plessis | 80 | 3,941 | 55.50 | 2012–2019 | |
| Number 4 | Boeta Dippenaar | 20 | 866 | 57.73 | 1999–2006 | |
| Number 5 | AB de Villiers | 42 | 2,027 | 77.96 ♠ | 2006–2018 | |
| Number 6 | Hansie Cronje | 45 | 1,235 | 42.58 | 1992–2002 | |
| Number 7 | Justin Kemp | 24 | 579 | 36.18 | 2005–2007 | |
| Number 8 | Lance Klusener | 36 | 1,056 | 58.66 ♠ | 1996–2004 | |
| Number 9 | Nicky Boje | 26 | 303 | 21.64 | 1996–2005 | |
| Number 10 | Morne Morkel | 29 | 147 | 9.80 | 2008–2018 | |
| Number 11 | Makhaya Ntini | 31 | 136 | 11.33 | 1998–2009 | |
Last updated: 22 February 2025. Qualification: Min 20 innings batted at position

==== Most half-centuries ====
A half-century is a score of between 50 and 99 runs. Statistically, once a batsman's score reaches 100, it is no longer considered a half-century but a century.

Sachin Tendulkar of India has scored the most half-centuries in ODIs with 96. He is followed by the Sri Lanka's Kumar Sangakkara on 93, South Africa's Jacques Kallis on 86 and India's Rahul Dravid and Pakistan's Inzamam-ul-Haq on 83.

| Rank | Half centuries | Player | Innings | Runs | Period |
|---|---|---|---|---|---|
| 1 | 86 | Jacques Kallis | 309 | 11,550 | 1996–2014 |
| 2 | 52 | AB de Villiers | 213 | 9,427 | 2005–2018 |
| 3 | 47 | Graeme Smith | 193 | 6,989 | 2002–2013 |
| 4 | 45 | Gary Kirsten | 185 | 6,798 | 1993–2003 |
| 5 | 39 | Hansie Cronje | 175 | 5,565 | 1992–2000 |
| 5 | 39 | Hashim Amla | 178 | 8,113 | 2008–2019 |
Last updated: 23 January 2023

==== Most centuries ====
A century is a score of 100 or more runs in a single inning.

Tendulkar has also scored the most centuries in ODIs with 49. Hashim Amla has the most centuries for South Africa.

| Rank | Centuries | Player | Innings | Runs | Period |
|---|---|---|---|---|---|
| 1 | 27 | Hashim Amla | 178 | 8,113 | 2008–2019 |
| 2 | 25 | AB de Villiers | 213 | 9,427 | 2005–2018 |
| 3 | 22 | Quinton de Kock† | 160 | 7,017 | 2013–2025 |
| 4 | 21 | Herschelle Gibbs | 240 | 8,094 | 1996–2010 |
| 5 | 17 | Jacques Kallis | 309 | 11,550 | 1996–2014 |
Last updated: 8 November 2025

==== Most Sixes ====
| Rank | Sixes | Player | Innings | Runs | Period |
|---|---|---|---|---|---|
| 1 | 200 | AB de Villiers | 213 | 9,427 | 2005–2018 |
| 2 | 153 | David Miller† | 156 | 4,762 | 2010–2025 |
| 3 | 137 | Jacques Kallis | 309 | 11,550 | 1996–2014 |
| 4 | 128 | Herschelle Gibbs | 240 | 8,094 | 1996–2010 |
| 5 | 128 | Quinton de Kock† | 160 | 7,017 | 2013–2025 |
Last updated: 8 November 2025

==== Most Fours ====
| Rank | Fours | Player | Innings | Runs | Period |
|---|---|---|---|---|---|
| 1 | 930 | Herschelle Gibbs | 240 | 8,094 | 1996-2010 |
| 2 | 910 | Jacques Kallis | 309 | 11,550 | 1996-2014 |
| 3 | 823 | AB de Villiers | 213 | 9,427 | 2005-2018 |
| 4 | 822 | Hashim Amla | 178 | 8,113 | 2008-2019 |
| 5 | 793 | Quinton de Kock† | 160 | 7,017 | 2013-2025 |
Last updated: 3 December 2025

==== Highest strike rates ====
Andre Russell of West Indies holds the record for highest strike rate, with minimum 500 balls faced qualification, with 130.22. Heinrich Klaasen is the South African with the highest strike rate.

| Rank | Strike rate | Player | Runs | Balls Faced | Period |
|---|---|---|---|---|---|
| 1 | 117.05 | Heinrich Klaasen | 2,141 | 1,829 | 2018–2025 |
| 2 | 102.99 | David Miller† | 4,511 | 4,380 | 2010–2025 |
| 3 | 101.33 | Albie Morkel | 760 | 750 | 2004–2012 |
| 4 | 101.27 | AB de Villiers | 9,427 | 9,308 | 2005–2018 |
| 5 | 97.90 | Farhaan Behardien | 1,074 | 1,097 | 2012–2018 |
Qualification: 500 balls faced. Last updated: 5 March 2025

==== Highest strike rates in an inning ====
James Franklin of New Zealand's strike rate of 387.50 during his 31* off 8 balls against Canada during 2011 Cricket World Cup is the world record for highest strike rate in an innings. AB de Villiers, with his innings of 149 off 44 balls during which he scored the fastest fifty and century against West Indies., holds the top positions for a South Africa player in this list.

| Rank | Strike rate | Player | Runs | Balls Faced | Opposition | Venue | Date |
|---|---|---|---|---|---|---|---|
| 1 | 338.63 | AB de Villiers | 149 | 44 | West Indies | New Wanderers Stadium, Johannesburg, South Africa | 18 January 2015 |
| 2 | 284.61 | Albie Morkel | 37* | 13 | Bangladesh | Willowmoore Park, Benoni, South Africa | 9 November 2008 |
| 3 | 272.22 | David Miller† | 49 | 18 | New Zealand | Eden Park, Auckland, New Zealand | 24 March 2015 ‡ |
| 4 | 266.66 | JP Duminy | 40 | 15 | Netherlands | Punjab Cricket Association Stadium, Mohali, India | 3 March 2011 ‡ |
| 5 | 255.00 | Mark Boucher | 51* | 20 | Kenya | Sahara Park Newlands, Cape Town, South Africa | 22 October 2011 |
Last updated: 1 July 2020

==== Most runs in a calendar year ====
Tendulkar holds the record for most runs scored in a calendar year with 1894 runs scored in 1998. Gary Kirsten scored 1467 runs in 2000, the most for a South Africa batsmen in a year.

| Rank | Runs | Player | Matches | Innings | Year |
|---|---|---|---|---|---|
| 1 | 1,467 | Gary Kirsten | 36 | 36 | 2000 |
| 2 | 1,442 | Gary Kirsten | 29 | 29 | 1996 |
| 3 | 1,310 | Herschelle Gibbs | 37 | 37 | 2002 |
| 4 | 1,300 | Jacques Kallis | 39 | 38 | 2000 |
| 5 | 1,204 | Jacques Kallis | 33 | 32 | 2002 |
Last updated: 1 July 2020

==== Most runs in a series ====
The 1980-81 Benson & Hedges World Series Cup in Australia saw Greg Chappell set the record for the most runs scored in a single series scoring 685 runs. He is followed by Sachin Tendulkar with 673 runs scored in the 2003 Cricket World Cup. Jacques Kallis has scored the most runs in a series for a South Africa batsmen, when he scored 485 runs in the 2007 Cricket World Cup.

| Rank | Runs | Player | Matches | Innings | Series |
|---|---|---|---|---|---|
| 1 | 594 | Quinton de Kock | 10 | 10 | 2023 Cricket World Cup |
| 2 | 485 | Jacques Kallis | 10 | 9 | 2007 Cricket World Cup |
| 3 | 482 | Ab de Villiers | 8 | 7 | 2015 Cricket World Cup |
| 4 | 464 | Faf du Plessis | 5 | 5 | 2014 Zimbabwe Tri-Series |
| 5 | 452 | Gary Kirsten | 11 | 11 | 1997–98 Carlton and United Series |
Last updated: 17 November 2023

==== Most ducks ====
A duck refers to a batsman being dismissed without scoring a run. Sanath Jayasuriya has scored the equal highest number of ducks in ODIs with 34 such knocks. Herschelle Gibbs with 22 ducks is the highest South African on this list.

| Rank | Ducks | Player | Matches | Innings | Period |
|---|---|---|---|---|---|
| 1 | 22 | Herschelle Gibbs | 248 | 240 | 1996–2010 |
| 2 | 20 | Shaun Pollock | 294 | 196 | 1996–2008 |
| 3 | 17 | Jacques Kallis | 323 | 309 | 1996–2014 |
| 4 | 16 | Mark Boucher | 290 | 216 | 1998–2011 |
| 5 | 13 | Lance Klusener | 171 | 137 | 1996–2004 |
Last updated: 1 July 2020

== Bowling records ==
=== Most career wickets ===
A bowler takes the wicket of a batsman when the form of dismissal is bowled, caught, leg before wicket, stumped or hit wicket. If the batsman is dismissed by run out, obstructing the field, handling the ball, hitting the ball twice or timed out the bowler does not receive credit.

Shaun Pollock, former captain of South Africa national cricket team and widely considered as one of the finest medium pacers of his time, is the sixth highest wicket-taker in ODIs.

| Rank | Wickets | Player | Matches | Innings | Average | Period |
|---|---|---|---|---|---|---|
| 1 | 387 | Shaun Pollock | 294 | 291 | 24.31 | 1996–2008 |
| 2 | 272 | Allan Donald | 164 | 162 | 21.78 | 1991–2003 |
| 3 | 269 | Jacques Kallis | 323 | 279 | 31.85 | 1996–2014 |
| 4 | 265 | Makhaya Ntini | 172 | 170 | 24.53 | 1998–2009 |
| 5 | 194 | Dale Steyn | 123 | 122 | 26.00 | 2006–2019 |
| 6 | 192 | Lance Klusener | 171 | 164 | 29.95 | 1996–2004 |
| 7 | 180 | Morne Morkel | 114 | 111 | 25.52 | 2007–2018 |
| 8 | 173 | Imran Tahir | 107 | 104 | 24.83 | 2011–2019 |
| 9 | 168 | Kagiso Rabada† | 106 | 104 | 27.45 | 2015–2025 |
| 10 | 115 | Lungi Ngidi† | 74 | 73 | 28.64 | 1992–2000 |
Last updated: 4 December 2025

=== Fastest wicket taker ===
| Wickets | Bowler | Match | Record Date | Reference |
|---|---|---|---|---|
| 50 | Lungi Ngidi† | 26 | 4 March 2020 | |
| 100 | Imran Tahir | 58 | 15 June 2016 | |
| 150 | Allan Donald | 89 | 3 November 1997 | |
| 200 | Allan Donald | 117 | 29 May 1999 ‡ | |
| 250 | Allan Donald | 148 | 13 September 2002 | |
| 300 | Shaun Pollock | 217 | 25 August 2004 | |
| 350 | Shaun Pollock | 262 | 16 October 2006 | |
Last updated: 1 July 2020

=== Most career wickets against each team ===
| Opposition | Wickets | Player | Matches | Innings | Average | Period | Ref |
|---|---|---|---|---|---|---|---|
| Afghanistan | 8 | Lungi Ngidi† | 5 | 5 | 25.37 | 2023–2025 | |
| Australia | 55 | Shaun Pollock | 42 | 42 | 27.72 | 1997–2007 | |
| Bangladesh | 21 | Kagiso Rabada† | 11 | 11 | 21.42 | 2015–2023 | |
| Canada | 2 | Makhaya Ntini | 1 | 1 | 9.5 | 2003–2003 | |
| England | 40 | Shaun Pollock | 30 | 30 | 21.77 | 1996–2007 | |
| India | 48 | Shaun Pollock | 33 | 33 | 24.47 | 1996–2006 | |
| Ireland | 6 | Morne Morkel | 2 | 2 | 11.16 | 2011–2015 | |
| Ireland | 6 | JP Duminy | 3 | 3 | 5.83 | 2007–2016 | |
| Ireland | 6 | Andile Phehlukwayo | 4 | 4 | 31.66 | 2016–2021 | |
| Kenya | 12 | Shaun Pollock | 6 | 6 | 12.91 | 1999–2003 | |
| Kenya | 12 | Lance Klusener | 7 | 7 | 10.58 | 1999–2003 | |
| Netherlands | 8 | Sisanda Magala | 2 | 2 | 10.00 | 2023–2023 | |
| New Zealand | 48 | Shaun Pollock | 43 | 40 | 27.31 | 1996–2007 | |
| Pakistan | 49 | Shaun Pollock | 36 | 36 | 25.14 | 1996–2007 | |
| Pakistan | 49 | Makhaya Ntini | 25 | 25 | 20.24 | 2000–2007 | |
| Scotland | 3 | Andrew Hall | 1 | 1 | 16.00 | 2007–2007 | |
| Sri Lanka | 51 | Shaun Pollock | 35 | 35 | 23.90 | 1997–2007 | |
| United Arab Emirates | 3 | Allan Donald | 1 | 1 | 7.00 | 1996–1996 | |
| United Arab Emirates | 3 | Brian McMillan | 1 | 1 | 3.66 | 1996–1996 | |
| West Indies | 44 | Shaun Pollock | 35 | 35 | 24.20 | 1996–2008 | |
| Zimbabwe | 19 | Imran Tahir | 7 | 7 | 12.05 | 2014–2018 | |
Last updated: 22 February 2025

=== Best figures in an innings ===
Bowling figures refers to the number of the wickets a bowler has taken and the number of runs conceded. Sri Lanka's Chaminda Vaas holds the world record for best figures in an innings when he took 8/19 against Zimbabwe in December 2001 at Colombo (SSC). Imran Tahir holds the South African record for best bowling figures.

| Rank | Figures | Player | Opposition | Venue | Date |
|---|---|---|---|---|---|
| 1 | 7/45 | Imran Tahir | West Indies | Warner Park, Basseterre, Saint Kitts & Nevis | 15 June 2016 |
| 2 | 6/16 | Kagiso Rabada | Bangladesh | Shere-e-Bangla Stadium, Mirpur, Bangladesh | 10 July 2015 |
| 3 | 6/22 | Makhaya Ntini | Australia | Sahara Park Newlands, Cape Town, South Africa | 3 March 2006 |
| 4 | 6/23 | Allan Donald | Kenya | Gymkhana Club Ground, Nairobi, Kenya | 3 October 1996 |
| 5 | 6/24 | Imran Tahir | Zimbabwe | Goodyear Park, Bloemfontein, South Africa | 3 October 2018 |
Last updated: 1 July 2020

=== Best figures in an innings – progression of record ===
| Figures | Player | Opposition | Venue | Date |
|---|---|---|---|---|
| 5/29 | Allan Donald | India | Eden Gardens, Kolkata, India | 1991–92 |
| 6/23 | Allan Donald | Kenya | Gymkhana Club Ground, Nairobi, Kenya | 1996–97 |
| 6/22 | Makhaya Ntini | Australia | Sahara Park Newlands, Cape Town, South Africa | 2005–06 |
| 6/16 | Kagiso Rabada | Bangladesh | Shere-e-Bangla Stadium, Mirpur, Bangladesh | 2015 |
| 7/45 | Imran Tahir | West Indies | Warner Park, Basseterre, Saint Kitts & Nevis | 2016 |
Last updated: 1 July 2020

=== Best Bowling Figure against each opponent ===
| Opposition | Figures | Player | Venue | Date | Ref |
|---|---|---|---|---|---|
| Afghanistan | 4/29 | Imran Tahir | Sophia Gardens, Cardiff, England | 15 June 2019 ‡ | |
| Australia | 6/22 | Makhaya Ntini | Newlands Cricket Ground, Cape Town, South Africa | 3 March 2006 | |
| Bangladesh | 6/16 | Kagiso Rabada | Shere Bangla National Stadium, Mirpur, Bangladesh | 10 July 2015 | |
| Canada | 2/19 | Makhaya Ntini | Buffalo Park, East London, South Africa | 27 February 2003 ‡ | |
| England | 5/18 | Andrew Hall | Kensington Oval, Bridgetown, Barbados | 17 April 2007 ‡ | |
| India | 5/29 | Allan Donald | Eden Gardens, Kolkata, India | 10 November 1991 | |
| Ireland | 4/12 | Vernon Philander | Stormont, Belfast, Northern Ireland | 24 June 2007 | |
| Kenya | 6/23 | Allan Donald | Gymkhana Club Ground, Nairobi, Kenya | 3 October 1996 | |
| Netherlands | 5/43 | Sisanda Magala | Wanderers Stadium, Johannesburg, South Africa | 2 April 2023 | |
| New Zealand | 5/31 | Makhaya Ntini | Melbourne Cricket Ground, Melbourne, Australia | 6 February 2002 | |
| Pakistan | 6/39 | Dale Steyn | St George's Park, Port Elizabeth, South Africa | 27 November 2013 | |
| Scotland | 3/48 | Andrew Hall | Warner Park, Basseterre, St Kitts & Nevis | 20 March 2007 ‡ | |
| Sri Lanka | 6/49 | Lance Klusener | Gaddafi Stadium, Lahore, Pakistan | 6 November 1997 | |
| United Arab Emirates | 3/11 | Brian McMillan | Rawalpindi Cricket Stadium, Rawalpindi, Pakistan | 16 February 1996 ‡ | |
| West Indies | 7/45 | Imran Tahir | Warner Park, Basseterre, St Kitts & Nevis | 15 June 2016 | |
| Zimbabwe | 6/24 | Imran Tahir | Mangaung Oval, Bloemfontein, South Africa | 3 October 2018 | |
Last updated: 1 July 2020.

=== Best career average ===
A bowler's bowling average is the total number of runs they have conceded divided by the number of wickets they have taken. Afghanistan's Rashid Khan holds the record for the best career average in ODIs with 18.54. Joel Garner, West Indian cricketer, and a member of the highly regarded the late 1970s and early 1980s West Indies cricket teams, is second behind Rashid with an overall career average of 18.84 runs per wicket. Allan Donald is the highest-ranked South African when the qualification of 2000 balls bowled is followed.

| Rank | Average | Player | Wickets | Runs | Balls | Period |
|---|---|---|---|---|---|---|
| 1 | 21.78 | Allan Donald | 272 | 5,926 | 8,561 | 1991–2003 |
| 2 | 24.31 | Shaun Pollock | 387 | 9,409 | 15,430 | 1996–2008 |
| 3 | 24.53 | Makhaya Ntini | 265 | 6,501 | 8,645 | 1998–2009 |
| 4 | 24.83 | Imran Tahir | 173 | 4,297 | 5,541 | 2011–2019 |
| 5 | 24.96 | Lonwabo Tsotsobe | 94 | 2,347 | 2,964 | 2009–2013 |
Qualification: 2,000 balls. Last updated: 1 July 2020

=== Best career economy rate ===
A bowler's economy rate is the total number of runs they have conceded divided by the number of overs they have bowled. West Indies' Joel Garner, holds the ODI record for the best career economy rate with 3.09. Pakistan's Sarfraz Nawaz, with a rate of 3.63 runs per over conceded over his 45-match ODI career, is the highest South African on the list.

| Rank | Economy rate | Player | Wickets | Runs | Balls | Period |
|---|---|---|---|---|---|---|
| 1 | 3.57 | Fanie de Villiers | 95 | 2,636 | 4,422 | 1992–1997 |
| 2 | 3.65 | Shaun Pollock | 387 | 9,409 | 15,430 | 1996–2008 |
| 3 | 3.94 | Craig Matthews | 79 | 1,975 | 3,003 | 1991–1997 |
| 4 | 4.15 | Pat Symcox | 72 | 2,762 | 3,991 | 1993–1999 |
| 4 | 4.15 | Allan Donald | 272 | 5,926 | 8,561 | 1991–2003 |
Qualification: 2,000 balls. Last updated: 1 July 2020

=== Best career strike rate ===
A bowler's strike rate is the total number of balls they have bowled divided by the number of wickets they have taken. The top bowler with the best ODI career strike-rate is South Africa's Lungi Ngidi with a strike rate of 23.2 balls per wicket. Lungi Ngidi is the highest-ranked South African on this list.

| Rank | Strike rate | Player | Wickets | Runs | Balls | Period |
|---|---|---|---|---|---|---|
| 1 | 29.73 | Lungi Ngidi† | 115 | 3,294 | 3,420 | 2018–2025 |
| 2 | 31.00 | Morne Morkel | 180 | 4,595 | 5,580 | 2007–2018 |
| 3 | 31.20 | Ryan McLaren | 77 | 2,102 | 2,403 | 2009–2014 |
| 4 | 31.47 | Allan Donald | 272 | 5,926 | 8,561 | 1991–2003 |
| 5 | 31.53 | Lonwabo Tsotsobe | 94 | 2,347 | 2,964 | 2009–2013 |
Qualification: 2,000 balls. Last updated: 4 December 2025

=== Most four-wickets (& over) hauls in an innings ===
Waqar Younis has taken the most four-wickets (or over) among all the bowlers. Shaun Pollock is the leading South African on this list.

| Rank | Four-wicket hauls | Player | Matches | Balls | Wickets | Period |
|---|---|---|---|---|---|---|
| 1 | 17 | Shaun Pollock | 294 | 15,430 | 387 | 1996–2008 |
| 2 | 13 | Allan Donald | 164 | 8,561 | 272 | 1991–2003 |
| 3 | 12 | Makhaya Ntini | 172 | 8,645 | 265 | 1998–2009 |
| 4 | 10 | Imran Tahir | 107 | 5,541 | 173 | 2011–2019 |
| 5 | 9 | Morne Morkel | 114 | 5,580 | 180 | 2007–2018 |
Last updated: 1 July 2020

=== Most five-wicket hauls in a match ===
A five-wicket haul refers to a bowler taking five wickets in a single innings. Waqar Younis with 13 such hauls has the most hauls among all the bowlers. Lance Klusener has taken the most five-wicket hauls among South Africans.

| Rank | Five-wicket hauls | Player | Matches | Balls | Wickets | Period |
|---|---|---|---|---|---|---|
| 1 | 6 | Lance Klusener | 171 | 7,336 | 192 | 1996–2004 |
| 2 | 5 | Shaun Pollock | 294 | 15,430 | 387 | 1996–2008 |
| 3 | 4 | Makhaya Ntini | 172 | 8,645 | 265 | 1998–2009 |
| 4 | 3 | Imran Tahir | 107 | 5,541 | 173 | 2011–2019 |
| 4 | 3 | Dale Steyn | 123 | 6,195 | 194 | 1998–2011 |
Last updated: 1 July 2020

=== Best economy rates in an inning ===
The best economy rate in an inning, when a minimum of 30 balls are delivered by the player, is West Indies player Phil Simmons economy of 0.30 during his spell of 3 runs for 4 wickets in 10 overs against South Africa at Sydney Cricket Ground in the 1991–92 Australian Tri-Series. Shaun Pollock holds the top three South African record.

| Rank | Economy | Player | Overs | Runs | Wickets | Opposition | Venue | Date |
|---|---|---|---|---|---|---|---|---|
| 1 | 0.66 | Shaun Pollock | 6 | 4 | 1 | Netherlands | Warner Park, Basseterre, Saint Kitts & Nevis | 16 March 2007 ‡ |
| 2 | 0.87 | Shaun Pollock | 8 | 7 | 3 | Zimbabwe | Axxess DSL St. Georges, Port Elizabeth, South Africa | 6 February 2000 |
| 3 | 0.90 | Shaun Pollock | 10 | 9 | 1 | Pakistan | Rawalpindi Cricket Stadium, Rawalpindi, Pakistan | 10 October 2003 |
| 4 | 0.93 | Dwaine Pretorius† | 5.2 | 5 | 3 | New Zealand | Westpac Stadium, Wellington, New Zealand | 25 February 2017 |
| 5 | 1.00 | Fanie de Villiers | 5 | 5 | 0 | West Indies | Brabourne Stadium, Mumbai, India | 14 November 1993 |
Qualification: 30 balls bowled. Last updated: 1 July 2020

=== Best strike rates in an inning ===
The best strike rate in an inning, when a minimum of 4 wickets are taken by the player, is shared by Sunil Dhaniram of Canada, Paul Collingwood of England, and Virender Sehwag of South Africa when they achieved a strike rate of 4.2 balls per wicket. Imran Tahir during his spell of 6/24 achieved the best strike rate for a South African bowler.

| Rank | Strike rate | Player | Wickets | Runs | Balls | Opposition | Venue | Date |
|---|---|---|---|---|---|---|---|---|
| 1 | 6.0 | Imran Tahir | 6 | 24 | 36 | Zimbabwe | Goodyear Park, Bloemfontein, South Africa | 3 October 2018 |
| 2 | 7.2 | Makhaya Ntini | 5 | 21 | 36 | Pakistan | Punjab Cricket Association Stadium, Mohali, India | 27 October 2006 |
| 2 | 7.2 | JP Duminy | 4 | 16 | 29 | Ireland | Willowmoore Park, Benoni, South Africa | 25 September 2016 |
| 4 | 7.7 | Imran Tahir | 7 | 45 | 54 | West Indies | Warner Park, Basseterre, Saint Kitts & Nevis | 15 June 2016 |
| 5 | 7.8 | Nicky Boje | 5 | 21 | 39 | Australia | Sahara Park Newlands, Cape Town, South Africa | 9 August 2002 |
Last updated: 1 July 2020

=== Worst figures in an innings ===
The worst figures in an ODI came in the 5th One Day International between South Africa at home to Australia in 2006. Australia's Mick Lewis returned figures of 0/113 from his 10 overs in the second innings of the match. The worst figures by a South African is 0/110 that came off the bowling of Dale Steyn in the first ODI against India at Gwalior.

| Rank | Figures | Player | Overs | Opposition | Venue | Date |
|---|---|---|---|---|---|---|
| 1 | 0/89 | Dale Steyn | 10 | India | Captain Roop Singh Stadium, Gwalior, India | 24 February 2010 |
| 2 | 0/83 | Shaun Pollock | 10 | Australia | Warner Park, Basseterre, Saint Kitts & Nevis | 24 March 2007 ‡ |
| 3 | 0/82 | André Nel | 10 | Pakistan | Sahara Stadium, Kingsmead, Durban, South Africa | 7 February 2007 |
| 4 | 0/81 | Rory Kleinveldt | 10 | India | SWALEC Stadium, Cardiff, England | 6 June 2013 |
| 5 | 0/77 | Charl Willoughby | 10 | India | Bangabandhu National Stadium, Dhaka, Bangladesh | 13 April 2003 |
Last updated: 1 July 2020

=== Most runs conceded in a match ===
Mick Lewis also holds the dubious distinction of most runs conceded in an ODI during the aforementioned match. Riaz holds the most runs conceded distinction for South Africa.

| Rank | Figures | Player | Overs | Opposition | Venue | Date |
|---|---|---|---|---|---|---|
| 1 | 2/96 | Dale Steyn | 10 | Australia | Sahara Stadium, Kingsmead, Durban, South Africa | 5 October 2016 |
| 2 | 2/95 | Wayne Parnell | 10 | India | Captain Roop Singh Stadium, Gwalior, India | 24 February 2010 |
| 3 | 0/89 | Dale Steyn | 10 | India | Captain Roop Singh Stadium, Gwalior, India | 24 February 2010 |
| 4 | 2/87 | Roger Telemachus | 10 | Australia | New Wanderers Stadium, Johannesburg, South Africa | 12 March 2006 |
| 4 | 2/87 | Marchant de Lange | 10 | England | Goodyear Park, Bloemfontein, South Africa | 3 February 2016 |
Last updated:1 July 2020

=== Most wickets in a calendar year ===
Pakistan's Saqlain Mushtaq holds the record for most wickets taken in a year when he took 69 wickets in 1997 in 36 ODIs. Shaun Pollock with 61 wickets in 2000 holds the South African record.

| Rank | Wickets | Player | Matches | Year |
|---|---|---|---|---|
| 1 | 61 | Shaun Pollock | 38 | 2000 |
| 2 | 54 | Shaun Pollock | 38 | 2002 |
| 3 | 51 | Allan Donald | 20 | 1996 |
| 4 | 50 | Makhaya Ntini | 31 | 2002 |
| 5 | 46 | Jacques Kallis | 39 | 2000 |
Last updated: 1 July 2020

=== Most wickets in a series ===
1998–99 Carlton and United Series involving Australia, England and Sri Lanka and the 2019 Cricket World Cup saw the records set for the most wickets taken by a bowler in an ODI series when Australian pacemen Glenn McGrath and Mitchell Starc achieved a total of 27 wickets during the series, respectively. Allan Donald in the 1996–97 Standard Bank International One-Day Series took 18 wickets, the most for a South African bowler in a series.

| Rank | Wickets | Player | Matches | Series |
|---|---|---|---|---|
| 1 | 20 | Gerald Coetzee | 8 | 2023 Cricket World Cup |
| 2 | 18 | Allan Donald | 8 | 1996–97 Standard Bank International One-Day Series |
| 3 | 17 | Craig Matthews | 7 | Australia in South Africa in 1994 |
| 3 | 17 | Allan Donald | 7 | Titan Cup |
| 3 | 17 | Allan Donald | 9 | 1997–98 Carlton and United Series |
| 3 | 17 | Lance Klusener | 9 | 1999 Cricket World Cup |
| 3 | 17 | Morne Morkel | 8 | 2015 Cricket World Cup |
| 3 | 17 | Marco Jansen | 9 | 2023 Cricket World Cup |
Last updated: 17 November 2023

=== Hat-trick ===
In cricket, a hat-trick occurs when a bowler takes three wickets with consecutive deliveries. The deliveries may be interrupted by an over bowled by another bowler from the other end of the pitch or the other team's innings, but must be three consecutive deliveries by the individual bowler in the same match. Only wickets attributed to the bowler count towards a hat-trick; runouts do not count. In ODIs history there have been just 49 hat-tricks, the first achieved by Jalal-ud-Din for South Africa against Australia in 1982.

| No. | Bowler | Against | Dismissals | Venue | Date | Ref. |
|---|---|---|---|---|---|---|
| 1 | Charl Langeveldt | West Indies | • Ian Bradshaw (b) • Daren Powell (b) • Corey Collymore (lbw) | Kensington Oval, Barbados | 11 May 2005 | |
| 2 | JP Duminy | Sri Lanka | • Angelo Mathews (c Faf du Plessis) • Nuwan Kulasekara (c Quinton de Kock) • Tharindu Kaushal (lbw) | (Australia) Sydney Cricket Ground, Sydney | 18 March 2015 ‡ | |
| 3 | Kagiso Rabada | Bangladesh | • Tamim Iqbal (b) • Litton Das (c Farhaan Behardien) • Mahmudullah Riyad (lbw) | (Bangladesh) Sher-e-Bangla National Cricket Stadium, Mirpur | 10 July 2015 ^{D} | |
| 4 | Imran Tahir | Zimbabwe | • Sean Williams (st Heinrich Klaasen) • Peter Moor (lbw) • Brandon Mavuta (b) | (South Africa) Mangaung Oval, Bloemfontein | 3 October 2018 | |

== Wicket-keeping records ==
The wicket-keeper is a specialist fielder who stands behind the stumps being guarded by the batsman on strike and is the only member of the fielding side allowed to wear gloves and leg pads.

=== Most career dismissals ===
A wicket-keeper can be credited with the dismissal of a batsman in two ways, caught or stumped. A fair catch is taken when the ball is caught fully within the field of play without it bouncing after the ball has touched the striker's bat or glove holding the bat, Laws 5.6.2.2 and 5.6.2.3 state that the hand or the glove holding the bat shall be regarded as the ball striking or touching the bat while a stumping occurs when the wicket-keeper puts down the wicket while the batsman is out of his ground and not attempting a run. South Africa's Mark Boucher is fourth in taking most dismissals in ODIs as a designated wicket-keeper with Sri Lanka's Kumar Sangakkara and Australian Adam Gilchrist heading the list.

| Rank | Dismissals | Player | Matches | Innings | Catches | Stumping | Dis/Inn | Period |
|---|---|---|---|---|---|---|---|---|
| 1 | 415 | Mark Boucher | 290 | 285 | 394 | 21 | 1.456 | 1998–2011 |
| 2 | 231 | Quinton de Kock† | 160 | 153 | 213 | 18 | 1.509 | 2013–2025 |
| 3 | 165 | Dave Richardson | 122 | 121 | 148 | 17 | 1.363 | 1991–1998 |
| 4 | 98 | AB de Villiers | 223 | 59 | 93 | 5 | 1.661 | 2005–2018 |
| 5 | 42 | Heinrich Klaasen | 60 | 23 | 35 | 7 | 1.826 | 2018–2025 |
Last updated: 3 December 2025

=== Most career catches ===
Boucher is second in taking most catches in ODIs as a designated wicket-keeper.

| Rank | Catches | Player | Matches | Innings | Period |
|---|---|---|---|---|---|
| 1 | 394 | Mark Boucher | 290 | 285 | 1998–2011 |
| 2 | 213 | Quinton de Kock† | 160 | 153 | 2013–2025 |
| 3 | 148 | Dave Richardson | 122 | 121 | 1991–1998 |
| 4 | 93 | AB de Villiers | 223 | 59 | 2005–2018 |
| 5 | 35 | Heinrich Klaasen | 60 | 23 | 2018–2025 |
Last updated: 3 December 2025

=== Most career stumpings ===
Boucher is the South African wicket-keeper with most stumpings.

| Rank | Stumpings | Player | Matches | Innings | Period |
|---|---|---|---|---|---|
| 1 | 21 | Mark Boucher | 290 | 285 | 1998–2011 |
| 2 | 18 | Quinton de Kock† | 160 | 153 | 2013–2025 |
| 3 | 17 | Dave Richardson | 122 | 121 | 1991–1998 |
| 4 | 7 | Heinrich Klaasen | 60 | 23 | 2018–2025 |
| 5 | 5 | AB de Villiers | 223 | 59 | 2005–2018 |
Last updated: 3 December 2025

=== Most dismissals in an innings ===
Ten wicket-keepers on 15 occasions have taken six dismissals in a single innings in an ODI. Both Boucher and de Kock have done it once each.

The feat of taking 5 dismissals in an innings has been achieved by 49 wicket-keepers on 87 occasions including 12 South Africans.

| Rank | Dismissals | Player | Opposition | Venue | Date |
|---|---|---|---|---|---|
| 1 | 6 | Mark Boucher | Pakistan | Sahara Park Newlands, Cape Town, South Africa | 11 February 2007 |
| 1 | 6 | Quinton de Kock | New Zealand | Bay Oval, Mount Maunganui, New Zealand | 21 October 2014 |
| 1 | 6 | Quinton de Kock | Afghanistan | Narendra Modi Stadium, Ahmedabad, India | 10 November 2023 |
| 4 | 5 | Dave Richardson | Pakistan | New Wanderers Stadium, Johannesburg, South Africa | 12 January 1995 |
| 4 | 5 | Dave Richardson | Zimbabwe | Harare Sports Club, Harare, Zimbabwe | 21 October 1995 |
| 4 | 5 | Mark Boucher | England | New Wanderers Stadium, Johannesburg, South Africa | 13 February 2000 |
| 4 | 5 | Mark Boucher | Australia | Sahara Stadium, Kingsmead, Durban, South Africa | 12 April 2000 |
| 4 | 5 | Mark Boucher | Pakistan | Sinhalese Sports Club Ground, Colombo, Sri Lanka | 12 July 2000 |
| 4 | 5 | Mark Boucher | Bangladesh | Bangabandhu National Stadium, Dhaka, Bangladesh | 17 April 2003 |
| 4 | 5 | Mark Boucher | New Zealand | Centurion Park, Centurion, South Africa | 6 November 2005 |
| 4 | 5 | Mark Boucher | Pakistan | New Wanderers Stadium, Johannesburg, South Africa | 14 February 2007 |
| 4 | 5 | AB de Villiers | Bangladesh | Shere-e-Bangla Stadium, Mirpur, Bangladesh | 14 March 2008 |
| 4 | 5 | Mark Boucher | India | Sardar Patel Stadium, Ahmedabad, India | 27 February 2010 |
| 4 | 5 | AB de Villiers | West Indies | Sahara Stadium, Kingsmead, Durban, South Africa | 16 January 2015 |
| 4 | 5 | Quinton de Kock | Sri Lanka | Rangiri Dambulla International Stadium, Dambulla, Sri Lanka | 29 July 2018 |
| 4 | 5 | Quinton de Kock | Netherlands | Willowmoore Park, Benoni, South Africa | 31 March 2023 |
Last updated: 17 November 2023

=== Most dismissals in a series ===
Gilchrist also holds the ODIs record for the most dismissals taken by a wicket-keeper in a series. He made 27 dismissals during the 1998-99 Carlton & United Series. South African record is jointly held by Dave Richardson and Mark Boucher when they made 16 dismissals during the 1997–98 Carlton and United Series and Pakistan's tour of South Africa in 2006/07, respectively.

| Rank | Dismissals | Player | Matches | Innings | Series |
|---|---|---|---|---|---|
| 1 | 20 | Quinton de Kock | 10 | 10 | 2023 Cricket World Cup |
| 2 | 16 | Mark Boucher | 5 | 5 | Pakistan's tour of South Africa in 2006/07 |
| 2 | 16 | Dave Richardson | 10 | 10 | 1997–98 Carlton and United Series |
| 4 | 15 | Quinton de Kock | 5 | 5 | South Africa's tour of Sri Lanka in 2018 |
| 4 | 15 | Dave Richardson | 9 | 9 | 1992 Cricket World Cup |
Last updated: 17 November 2023

== Fielding records ==
=== Most career catches ===
Caught is one of the nine methods a batsman can be dismissed in cricket. (Note: In 2017, The Laws of Cricket were amended, reducing the methods of dismissals from ten to nine, with handled the ball now covered as part of obstructing the field.) The majority of catches are caught in the slips, located behind the batsman, next to the wicket-keeper, on the off side of the field. Most slip fielders are top order batsmen.

Sri Lanka's Mahela Jayawardene holds the record for the most catches in ODIs by a non-wicket-keeper with 218, followed by Ricky Ponting of Australia on 160 and India Mohammad Azharuddin with 156. Jacques Kallis is the leading catcher for South Africa.

| Rank | Catches | Player | Matches | Innings | Ct/Inn | Period |
|---|---|---|---|---|---|---|
| 1 | 131 | Jacques Kallis | 323 | 319 | 0.410 | 1996–2014 |
| 2 | 108 | Herschelle Gibbs | 248 | 246 | 0.439 | 1996–2010 |
| 3 | 105 | Graeme Smith | 196 | 195 | 0.538 | 2002–2013 |
| 3 | 105 | Jonty Rhodes | 245 | 242 | 0.433 | 1992–2003 |
| 5 | 104 | Shaun Pollock | 294 | 291 | 0.357 | 1996–2008 |
Last updated: 17 November 2023

=== Most catches in an innings ===
South Africa's Jonty Rhodes is the only fielder to have taken five catches in an innings.

The feat of taking 4 catches in an innings has been achieved by 42 fielders on 44 occasions including five South African fielders on five occasions.

| Dismissals | Player | Opposition | Venue | Date |
|---|---|---|---|---|
| 5 | Jonty Rhodes | West Indies | Brabourne Stadium, Mumbai, India | 14 November 1993 |
| 4 | Kepler Wessels | West Indies | Sabina Park, Kingston, Jamaica | 7 April 1992 |
| 4 | Ashwell Prince | West Indies | Queen's Park Oval, Port of Spain, Trinidad & Tobago | 14 May 2005 |
| 4 | Graeme Smith | India | Sahara Park Newlands, Cape Town, South Africa | 26 November 2006 |
| 4 | Hashim Amla | Pakistan | Centurion Park, Centurion, South Africa | 30 November 2013 |
| 4 | Rilee Rossouw | Australia | Sydney Cricket Ground, Sydney, Australia | 23 November 2014 |
Last updated: 1 July 2020

=== Most catches in a series ===
The 2019 Cricket World Cup, which was won by England for the first time, saw the record set for the most catches taken by a non-wicket-keeper in an ODI series. Englishman batsman and captain of the England Test team Joe Root took 13 catches in the series as well as scored 556 runs. Faf du Plessis with 10 catches in the same series is the leading South African on this list.

| Catches | Player | Matches | Innings | Series |
|---|---|---|---|---|
| 10 | Faf du Plessis | 9 | 8 | 2019 Cricket World Cup |
| 9 | Jonty Rhodes | 11 | 11 | 1997–98 Carlton and United Series |
| 9 | Jacques Kallis | 7 | 7 | West Indies in South Africa in 1999 |
| 9 | Rilee Rossouw | 6 | 6 | 2015 Cricket World Cup |
| 8 | Kepler Wessels | 8 | 8 | Australia in South Africa in 1994 |
| 8 | Daryll Cullinan | 9 | 9 | 1999 Cricket World Cup |
| 8 | Graeme Smith | 10 | 10 | 2007 Cricket World Cup |
Last updated: 1 July 2020

== All-round Records ==
=== 1000 runs and 100 wickets ===
A total of 64 players have achieved the double of 1000 runs and 100 wickets in their ODI career.

| Rank | Player | Average Difference | Period | Matches | Runs | Bat Avg | Wickets | Bowl Avg |
|---|---|---|---|---|---|---|---|---|
| 1 | Jacques Kallis | 13.26 | 1996-2014 | 323 | 11550 | 45.11 | 269 | 31.85 |
| 2 | Lance Klusener | 11.15 | 1996-2004 | 171 | 3576 | 41.1 | 192 | 29.95 |
| 3 | Hansie Cronje | 3.85 | 1992-2000 | 188 | 5565 | 38.64 | 114 | 34.78 |
| 4 | Shaun Pollock | 1.02 | 1996-2008 | 294 | 3193 | 25.34 | 387 | 24.31 |
Last updated: 1 July 2020

=== 250 runs and 5 wickets in a series ===
A total of 50 players on 103 occasions have achieved the double of 250 runs and 5 wickets in a series.

| Player | Matches | Runs | Wickets | Series |
|---|---|---|---|---|
| Peter Kirsten | 8 | 410 | 5 | 1992 Cricket World Cup |
| Hansie Cronje | 10 | 284 | 6 | Benson and Hedges World Series |
| Hansie Cronje | 8 | 266 | 8 | Mandela Trophy |
| Hansie Cronje | 8 | 274 | 7 | 1996–97 Standard Bank International One-Day Series |
| Jacques Kallis | 11 | 378 | 6 | 1997–98 Carlton and United Series |
| Hansie Cronje | 7 | 285 | 11 | West Indies in South Africa in 1999 |
| Jacques Kallis | 7 | 323 | 7 | South Africa in New Zealand in 1999 |
| Jacques Kallis | 8 | 312 | 8 | 1999 Cricket World Cup |
| Lance Klusener | 9 | 281 | 17 | 1999 Cricket World Cup |
| Jacques Kallis | 7 | 290 | 8 | 2000 Standard Bank Triangular Tournament |
| Jacques Kallis | 6 | 266 | 7 | Sri Lanka in South Africa in 2000 |
| Jacques Kallis | 6 | 298 | 10 | South Africa in West Indies in 2001 |
| Jacques Kallis | 8 | 322 | 10 | 2001–02 VB Series |
| Jacques Kallis | 7 | 255 | 7 | Australia in South Africa in 2001-02 |
| Jacques Kallis | 6 | 329 | 7 | 2003 NatWest Series |
| Jacques Kallis | 5 | 361 | 6 | West Indies in South Africa in 2004 |
| Jacques Kallis | 10 | 485 | 5 | 2007 Cricket World Cup |
Last updated: 1 July 2020

== Other records ==
=== Most career matches ===
India's Sachin Tendulkar holds the record for the most ODI matches played with 463, with former captains Mahela Jayawardene and Sanath Jayasuriya being second and third having represented Sri Lanka on 443 and 441 occasions, respectively. Jacques Kallis is the most experienced South Africa players having represented the team on 328 occasions.

| Rank | Matches | Player | Runs | Wkts | Period |
|---|---|---|---|---|---|
| 1 | 328 | Jacques Kallis | 11,550 | 269 | 1996–2014 |
| 2 | 294 | Shaun Pollock | 3,193 | 387 | 1996–2008 |
| 3 | 290 | Mark Boucher | 4,523 | - | 1998–2011 |
| 4 | 248 | Herschelle Gibbs | 8,094 | - | 1996–2010 |
| 5 | 245 | Jonty Rhodes | 5,935 | - | 1992–2003 |
Last updated: 31 January 2023

=== Most consecutive career matches ===
Tendulkar also holds the record for the most consecutive ODI matches played with 185. He broke Richie Richardson's long-standing record of 132 matches.

| Rank | Matches | Player | Period |
|---|---|---|---|
| 1 | 162 | Hansie Cronje | 1993–2000 |
| 2 | 133 | Shaun Pollock | 2000–2005 |
| 3 | 120 | Mark Boucher | 2002–2007 |
| 4 | 70 | Lance Klusener | 1999–2001 |
| 5 | 69 | Mark Boucher | 1998–2000 |
Last updated: 3 June 2018

=== Most matches as captain ===
Ricky Ponting, who led the Australian cricket team from 2002 to 2012, holds the record for the most matches played as captain in ODIs with 230 (including 1 as captain of ICC World XI team). Graeme Smith has led South Africa in 149 matches, the most for any player from his country.

| Rank | Matches | Player | Won | Lost | Tied | NR | Win % | Period |
|---|---|---|---|---|---|---|---|---|
| 1 | 149 | Graeme Smith | 92 | 51 | 1 | 5 | 64.23 | 2003–2011 |
| 2 | 138 | Hansie Cronje | 99 | 35 | 1 | 3 | 73.70 | 1994–2000 |
| 3 | 103 | AB de Villiers | 59 | 39 | 1 | 4 | 60.10 | 2012–2017 |
| 4 | 92 | Shaun Pollock | 59 | 29 | 3 | 1 | 66.48 | 2000–2005 |
| 5 | 52 | Kepler Wessels | 20 | 30 | 0 | 2 | 40.00 | 1992–1994 |
Last updated: 31 January 2023

=== Most matches won as captain ===
Ricky Ponting, who led the Australian cricket team from 2002 to 2012, holds the record for the most matches played as captain in ODIs with 230 (including 1 as captain of ICC World XI team). Graeme Smith has led South Africa in 149 matches, the most for any player from his country.

| Rank | Matches | Player | Won | Lost | Tied | NR | Win % | Period |
|---|---|---|---|---|---|---|---|---|
| 1 | 99 | Hansie Cronje | 138 | 35 | 1 | 3 | 73.70 | 1994–2000 |
| 2 | 92 | Graeme Smith | 149 | 51 | 1 | 5 | 64.23 | 2003–2011 |
| 3 | 59 | Shaun Pollock | 92 | 29 | 3 | 1 | 66.48 | 2000–2005 |
| 3 | 59 | AB de Villiers | 103 | 39 | 1 | 4 | 60.10 | 2012–2017 |
| 5 | 28 | Faf du Plessis | 39 | 10 | 0 | 1 | 73.68 | 2013–2019 |
Last updated: 31 January 2023

=== Most man of the match awards ===
| Rank | M.O.M Awards | Player | Matches | Period |
|---|---|---|---|---|
| 1 | 32 | Jacques Kallis | 323 | 1996–2014 |
| 2 | 27 | AB de Villiers | 223 | 2005–2018 |
| 3 | 22 | Herschelle Gibbs | 248 | 1996–2010 |
| 4 | 21 | Shaun Pollock | 294 | 1996–2008 |
| 5 | 19 | Quinton de Kock | 155 | 2013–2023 |
| 5 | 19 | Lance Klusener | 171 | 1996–2004 |
Last updated: 17 November 2023

=== Most man of the series awards ===
| Rank | M.O.S Awards | Player | Matches | Period |
|---|---|---|---|---|
| 1 | 8 | Shaun Pollock | 294 | 1996–2008 |
| 2 | 6 | Quinton de Kock | 155 | 2013–2023 |
| 2 | 6 | Hashim Amla | 181 | 2008–2019 |
| 2 | 6 | AB de Villiers | 223 | 2005–2018 |
| 5 | 3 | Jacques Kallis | 323 | 1996-2014 |
Last updated: 17 November 2023

=== Youngest players on Debut ===
The youngest player to play in an ODI match is claimed to be Hasan Raza at the age of 14 years and 233 days. Making his debut for Pakistan against Zimbabwe on 30 October 1996, there is some doubt as to the validity of Raza's age at the time. The youngest Indian to play ODIs was Sachin Tendulkar who at the age of 16 years and 238 days debuted in the second ODI of the series against Pakistan in December 1989.

| Rank | Age | Player | Opposition | Venue | Date |
|---|---|---|---|---|---|
| 1 | 18 years and 255 days | Kwena Maphaka | Pakistan | Newlands, Cape Town, South Africa | 22 December 2024 |
| 2 | 18 years and 314 days | Victor Mpitsang | West Indies | Mangaung Oval, Bloemfontein, South Africa | 5 February 1999 |
| 3 | 18 years and 354 days | Paul Adams | England | Newlands Cricket Ground, Cape Town, South Africa | 9 January 1996 |
| 4 | 19 years and 184 days | Wayne Parnell | Australia | WACA Ground, Perth, Australia | 30 January 2009 |
| 5 | 19 years and 245 days | Wiaan Mulder | Bangladesh | Buffalo Park, East London, South Africa | 22 October 2017 |
Last updated: 1 July 2020

=== Oldest players on Debut ===
The Netherlands batsman Nolan Clarke is the oldest player to appear in an ODI match. Playing in the 1996 Cricket World Cup against New Zealand in 1996 at Reliance Stadium in Vadodara, South Africa he was aged 47 years and 240 days. Clive Rice is the oldest South African ODI debutant when he played the South Africa's inaugural ODI during 1991 tour of India at the Eden Gardens, Kolkata.

| Rank | Age | Player | Opposition | Venue | Date |
|---|---|---|---|---|---|
| 1 | 42 years and 110 days | Clive Rice | India | Eden Gardens, Kolkata, India | 10 November 1991 |
| 2 | 40 years and 39 days | Omar Henry | Sri Lanka | Basin Reserve, Wellington, New Zealand | 2 March 1992 ‡ |
| 3 | 38 years and 102 days | Jimmy Cook | India | Eden Gardens, Kolkata, India | 10 November 1991 |
| 4 | 36 years and 180 days | Peter Kirsten | India | Eden Gardens, Kolkata, India | 10 November 1991 |
| 5 | 33 years and 315 days | Henry Davids | Pakistan | Centurion Park, Centurion, South Africa | 30 November 2013 |
Last updated: 1 July 2020

=== Oldest players ===
The Netherlands batsmen Nolan Clarke is the oldest player to appear in an ODI match. Playing in the 1996 Cricket World Cup against South Africa in 1996 at Rawalpindi Cricket Stadium in Rawalpindi, Pakistan he was aged 47 years and 257 days.

| Rank | Age | Player | Opposition | Venue | Date |
|---|---|---|---|---|---|
| 1 | 42 years and 114 days | Clive Rice | India | Arun Jaitley Stadium, Delhi, India | 14 November 1991 |
| 2 | 40 years and 101 days | Imran Tahir | Australia | Old Trafford, Manchester, England | 6 July 2019 ‡ |
| 3 | 40 years and 79 days | Omar Henry | West Indies | Queen's Park Oval, Port of Spain, Trinidad & Tobago | 11 April 1992 |
| 4 | 40 years and 33 days | Jimmy Cook | Sri Lanka | R Premadasa Stadium, Colombo, Sri Lanka | 2 September 1993 |
| 5 | 39 years and 103 days | Peter Kirsten | England | Edgbaston, Birmingham, England | 25 August 1994 |
Last updated: 1 July 2020

== Partnership records ==
In cricket, two batsmen are always present at the crease batting together in a partnership. This partnership will continue until one of them is dismissed, retires or the innings comes to a close.

=== Highest partnerships by wicket ===
A wicket partnership describes the number of runs scored before each wicket falls. The first wicket partnership is between the opening batsmen and continues until the first wicket falls. The second-wicket partnership then commences between the not out batsman and the number three batsman. This partnership continues until the second wicket falls. The third-wicket partnership then commences between the not-out batsman and the new batsman. This continues down to the tenth wicket partnership. When the tenth wicket has fallen, there is no batsman left to partner so the innings is closed.

| Wicket | Runs | First batsman | Second batsman | Opposition | Venue | Date | Scorecard |
|---|---|---|---|---|---|---|---|
| 1st wicket | 282* | Quinton de Kock† | Hashim Amla | Bangladesh | De Beers Diamond Oval, Kimberley, South Africa | 15 October 2017 | Scorecard |
| 2nd wicket | 247 | Faf du Plessis† | Hashim Amla | Ireland | Manuka Oval, Canberra, Australia | 3 March 2015 ‡ | Scorecard |
| 3rd wicket | 247 | Rilee Rossouw | Hashim Amla | West Indies | Centurion Park, Centurion, South Africa | 28 January 2015 | Scorecard |
| 4th wicket | 252 | Faf du Plessis† | David Miller† | Australia | Bellerive Oval, Hobart, Australia | 11 November 2018 | Scorecard |
| 5th wicket | 256* | JP Duminy | David Miller† | Zimbabwe | Seddon Park, Hamilton, New Zealand | 15 February 2015 ‡ | Scorecard |
| 6th wicket | 137 | Hansie Cronje | Shaun Pollock | Zimbabwe | New Wanderers Stadium, Johannesburg, South Africa | 31 January 1997 | Scorecard |
| 7th wicket | 114 | Mark Boucher | Lance Klusener | India | Vidarbha Cricket Association Ground, Nagpur, India | 19 March 2000 | Scorecard |
| 8th wicket | 138* | Justin Kemp | Andrew Hall | India | Sahara Park Newlands, Cape Town, South Africa | 26 November 2006 | Scorecard |
| 9th wicket | 95 | David Miller† | Rory Kleinveldt | England | The Oval, London, England | 19 June 2013 | Scorecard |
| 10th wicket | 67* | Albie Morkel | Makhaya Ntini | New Zealand | McLean Park, Napier, New Zealand | 2 March 2004 | Scorecard |
Last updated: 1 July 2020

=== Highest partnerships by runs ===
The highest ODI partnership by runs for any wicket is held by the West Indian pairing of Chris Gayle and Marlon Samuels who put together a second-wicket partnership of 372 runs during the 2015 Cricket World Cup against Zimbabwe in February 2015. This broke the record of 331 runs set by the Indian pair of Sachin Tendulkar and Rahul Dravid against New Zealand in 1999

| Wicket | Runs | First batsman | Second batsman | Opposition | Venue | Date | Scorecard |
|---|---|---|---|---|---|---|---|
| 1st wicket | 282* | Quinton de Kock† | Hashim Amla | Bangladesh | De Beers Diamond Oval, Kimberley, South Africa | 15 October 2017 | Scorecard |
| 5th wicket | 256* | David Miller† | JP Duminy | Zimbabwe | Seddon Park, Hamilton, New Zealand | 15 February 2015 ‡ | Scorecard |
| 4th wicket | 252 | David Miller† | Faf du Plessis | Australia | Bellerive Oval, Hobart, Australia | 11 November 2018 | Scorecard |
| 1st wicket | 247 | Rilee Rossouw | Hashim Amla | West Indies | New Wanderers Stadium, Johannesburg, South Africa | 18 January 2015 | Scorecard |
| 3rd wicket | 247 | Rilee Rossouw | Hashim Amla | West Indies | Centurion Park, Centurion, South Africa | 28 January 2015 | Scorecard |
| 2nd wicket | 247 | Faf du Plessis | Hashim Amla | Ireland | Manuka Oval, Canberra, Australia | 3 March 2015 ‡ | Scorecard |
Last updated: 1 July 2020

=== Highest overall partnership runs by a pair ===
| Rank | Runs | Innings | Players | Highest | Average | 100/50 | ODI career span |
|---|---|---|---|---|---|---|---|
| 1 | 4,300 | 95 | Hashim Amla & Quinton de Kock | 282* | 46.73 | 11/15 | 2013–2019 |
| 2 | 3,607 | 84 | Herschelle Gibbs & Graeme Smith | 187 | 43.45 | 11/15 | 2002–2009 |
| 3 | 3,166 | 69 | Herschelle Gibbs & Jacques Kallis | 179 | 48.7 | 9/12 | 1997–2010 |
| 4 | 3,111 | 45 | Hashim Amla & AB de Villiers | 238 | 72.34 | 12/8 | 2008–2018 |
| 5 | 2,906 | 68 | Herschelle Gibbs & Gary Kirsten | 225 | 46.12 | 9/12 | 1997–2008 |
An asterisk (*) signifies an unbroken partnership (i.e. neither of the batsmen was dismissed before either the end of the allotted overs or the required score being reached). Last updated: 11 October 2022

== Umpiring records ==
=== Most matches umpired ===
An umpire in cricket is a person who officiates the match according to the Laws of Cricket. Two umpires adjudicate the match on the field, whilst a third umpire has access to video replays, and a fourth umpire looks after the match balls and other duties. The records below are only for on-field umpires.

Rudi Koertzen of South Africa holds the record for the most ODI matches umpired with 209. The current active Aleem Dar is currently at 208 matches. They are followed by New Zealand's Billy Bowden who officiated in 200 matches.

| Rank | Matches | Umpire | Period |
|---|---|---|---|
| 1 | 209 | Rudi Koertzen | 1992–2010 |
| 2 | 107 | Dave Orchard | 1994–2003 |
| 3 | 95 | Marais Erasmus | 2007–2021 |
| 4 | 94 | Brian Jerling | 2000–2011 |
| 5 | 66 | Ian Howell | 2000–2009 |
Last updated: 7 April 2021

== See also ==
- List of One Day International cricket records
- List of One Day International cricket hat-tricks
- List of Test cricket records
- List of List A cricket records
- List of Cricket World Cup records
