= South African cricket team in Australia in 1997–98 =

International cricket tour

The South African national cricket team toured Australia in the 1997–98 season. They played 3 test matches. Australia won the Test series 1–0.

South Africa also competed in a Carlton and United Series with Australia and New Zealand they won 7 of their 8-round robin matches but lost the best of three final 2–1 to Australia despite having won the first 'final'.

== Test series summary ==
=== 1st Test ===
26–30 December 1997
(5-day match)
Scorecard

Australia	v	South Africa
309 (121.2 overs); RT Ponting 105 (208); PL Symcox 4/69 (27.2 overs)		186 (106.5 overs); G Kirsten 83 (256); MS Kasprowicz 3/28 (13.5 overs)
257 (96.2 overs); PR Reiffel 79* (115); AA Donald 6/59 (27 overs)		273/7 (122 overs); JH Kallis 101 (279); SK Warne 3/97 (44 overs)

Match drawn
Melbourne Cricket Ground, Melbourne
Umpires: SA Bucknor (SA) and SG Randell (AUS)
Player of the match: JH Kallis (SA)

- Australia won the toss and elected to bat.

=== 2nd Test ===
2–5 January 1998
(5-day match)
Scorecard

South Africa	v	Australia
287 (124.1 overs); WJ Cronje 88 (262); SK Warne 5/75 (32.1 overs)		421 (167.4 overs); ME Waugh 100 (186); SM Pollock 3/71 (33 overs)
113 (53 overs); JH Kallis 45 (110); SK Warne 6/34 (21 overs)

Australia won by an innings and 21 runs
Sydney Cricket Ground, Sydney
Umpires: DB Hair (AUS) and P Willey (ENG)
Player of the match: SK Warne (AUS)

- South Africa won the toss and elected to bat.
- The match was scheduled for five days but completed in four.

=== 3rd Test ===
30 January–3 February 1998
(5-day match)
Scorecard

South Africa	v	Australia
517 (166 overs); BM McMillan 87 (165); MS Kasprowicz 3/125 (39 overs)		350 (122.5 overs); MA Taylor 169* (378); SM Pollock 7/87 (41 overs)
193/6d (58 overs); G Kirsten 108* (159); SCG MacGill 3/22 (7 overs)		227/7 (108.4 overs); ME Waugh 115* (305); L Klusener 4/67 (30 overs)

Match drawn
Adelaide Oval, Adelaide
Umpires: DB Cowie (NZ) and SG Randell (AUS)
Player of the match: SM Pollock (SA)

- South Africa won the toss and elected to bat.
- SCG MacGill (AUS) made his Test debut.

== External sources ==
- CricketArchive
