= South African cricket team in New Zealand in 1998–99 =

The South African national cricket team toured New Zealand in February and March 1999 and played a three-match Test series against the New Zealand national cricket team. South Africa won the series 1–0. New Zealand were captained by Dion Nash and South Africa by Hansie Cronje. In addition, the teams played a six-match series of Limited Overs Internationals (LOI) which South Africa won 3–2.

== One Day Internationals (ODIs) ==
=== 1st ODI ===
14 February 1999 (D/N)
Scorecard

South Africa; 211 (49.1 overs)	v	New Zealand; 215/7 (49.1 overs)
JH Kallis 100 (117); GI Allott 4/35 (9 overs)		NJ Astle 95 (118); AA Donald 3/42 (10 overs)

New Zealand won by 3 wickets
Carisbrook, Dunedin
Umpires: DB Cowie and RS Dunne
Player of the match: NJ Astle (NZ)

- New Zealand won the toss and elected to field.

=== 2nd ODI ===
17 February 1999 (D/N)
Scorecard

New Zealand; 220/9 (50 overs)	v	South Africa; 224/3 (43 overs)
RG Twose 78 (123); SM Pollock 4/45 (10 overs)		G Kirsten 81* (109); GI Allott 2/42 (10 overs)

South Africa won by 7 wickets
Jade Stadium, Christchurch
Umpires: CE King and EA Watkin
Player of the match: G Kirsten (SA)

- New Zealand won the toss and elected to bat.

=== 3rd ODI ===
20 February 1999
Scorecard

South Africa; 212/7 (50 overs)	v	New Zealand; 215/3 (43.1 overs)
L Klusener 103* (132); CZ Harris 3/32 (10 overs)		NJ Astle 100* (126); SM Pollock 1/20 (8 overs)

New Zealand won by 7 wickets
Eden Park, Auckland
Umpires: BF Bowden and DB Cowie
Player of the match: NJ Astle (NZ)

- New Zealand won the toss and elected to field.

=== 4th ODI ===
25 March 1999 (D/N)
Scorecard

New Zealand; 257/8 (50 overs)	v	South Africa; 10/0 (1.3 overs)
AC Parore 44 (43); L Klusener 2/40 (10 overs)		G Kirsten 5* (5)

No result
McLean Park, Napier
Umpires: BF Bowden and DM Quested

- South Africa won the toss and elected to field.
- CE Bulfin (NZ) made his ODI debut.
- The match was reduced to 48 overs per side.

==== Replay ====
26 March 1999
Scorecard

New Zealand; 191 (38.4 overs)	v	South Africa; 194/8 (40 overs)
RG Twose 79* (77); SM Pollock 3/33 (7.4 overs)		DJ Cullinan 61 (77); GI Allott 2/33 (7 overs)

South Africa won by 2 wickets
McLean Park, Napier
Umpires: BF Bowden and DM Quested
Player of the match: L Klusener (SA)

- South Africa won the toss and elected to field.
- The match was reduced before play started to 40 overs per side.

=== 5th ODI ===
27 March 1999 (D/N)
Scorecard

South Africa; 290/5 (50 overs)	v	New Zealand; 147 (36.1 overs)
JH Kallis 100 (125); GI Allott 4/47 (10 overs)		CZ Harris 31 (47); WJ Cronje 3/26 (6 overs)

South Africa won by 143 runs
Eden Park, Auckland
Umpires: CE King and EA Watkin
Player of the match: DJ Cullinan (SA)

- South Africa won the toss and elected to bat.

=== 6th ODI ===
30 March 1999
Scorecard

South Africa; 249/4 (48.4 overs)	v	New Zealand
JH Kallis 54 (89); NJ Astle 2/33 (6 overs)

No result
Basin Reserve, Wellington
Umpires: RS Dunne and EA Watkin
Player of the match: GR Larsen (NZ)

- South Africa won the toss and elected to bat.

==== Replay ====
31 March 1999
Scorecard

New Zealand	v	South Africa

Match abandoned without a ball bowled
Basin Reserve, Wellington
Umpires: RS Dunne and EA Watkin

- No toss

== Test series summary ==
=== 1st Test ===
27 February – 3 March 1999
Scorecard

South Africa	v	New Zealand
621/5d (200.1 overs); Daryll Cullinan 275* (490); Chris Harris 2/94 (45 overs)		352 (160.4 overs); Matt Horne 93 (225); Paul Adams 3/103 (46 overs)
		244/3 (84 overs) (f/o); Nathan Astle 69* (130); Shaun Pollock 1/21 (13 overs)

Match drawn
Eden Park, Auckland
Umpires: Doug Cowie (NZ) and Daryl Harper (Aus)
Player of the match: Daryll Cullinan (SA)

- New Zealand won the toss and elected to field.
- Daryll Cullinan's 275 not out was, at the time, the highest Test score by a South African, surpassing Graeme Pollock's 274 against Australia at Durban in 1970. Geoff Allott made the longest Test duck during New Zealand's first innings, taking 101 minutes and facing 77 balls.

=== 2nd Test ===
11–15 March 1999
Scorecard

New Zealand	v	South Africa
168 (63.4 overs); Nathan Astle 44 (83); Shaun Pollock 4/34 (17 overs)		442/1d (162 overs); Herschelle Gibbs 211* (468); Daniel Vettori 1/73 (24 overs)
127/1 (54 overs); Matt Horne 56 (134)

Match drawn
Lancaster Park, Christchurch
Umpires: K. T. Francis (SL) and Dave Quested (NZ)
Player of the match: Herschelle Gibbs (SA)

- New Zealand won the toss and elected to bat.
- Gary Stead (NZ) made his Test debut.

=== 3rd Test ===
18–22 March 1999
Scorecard

New Zealand	v	South Africa
222 (102.3 overs); Gary Stead 68 (153); Shaun Pollock 5/33 (28.3 overs)		498/8d (165 overs); Daryll Cullinan 152 (272); Daniel Vettori 4/153 (54 overs)
291 (105.3 overs); Nathan Astle 62 (144); Paul Adams 4/63 (22.3 overs)		16/2 (8.1 overs); Gary Kirsten 12* (17); Daniel Vettori 1/7 (4 overs)

South Africa won by 8 wickets
Basin Reserve, Wellington
Umpires: Steve Dunne (NZ) and Srinivas Venkataraghavan (Ind)
Player of the match: Steve Elworthy (SA)

- New Zealand won the toss and elected to bat.
