= South African cricket team in Australia in 2025 =

International cricket tour

	Australia	South Africa
- Dates: 10 – 24 August 2025
Captains	Mitchell Marsh	Temba Bavuma (ODIs) (Note: Aiden Markram captained South Africa in the second ODI.); Aiden Markram (T20Is)

One Day International series
- Results: South Africa won the 3-match series 2–1
Most runs	Mitchell Marsh (206)	Matthew Breetzke (145)
Most wickets	Cooper Connolly (5); Adam Zampa (5)	Lungi Ngidi (7)
- Player of the series: Keshav Maharaj (SA)

Twenty20 International series
- Results: Australia won the 3-match series 2–1
Most runs	Tim David (150)	Dewald Brevis (180)
Most wickets	Josh Hazlewood (6)	Kwena Maphaka (9)
- Player of the series: Tim David (Aus)

The South Africa cricket team toured Australia in August 2025 to play the Australia cricket team. The tour consisted of three One Day International (ODI) and three Twenty20 International (T20I) matches. In March 2025, the Cricket Australia (CA) confirmed the fixtures for the tour, as a part of the 2025 home international season.

== Squads ==
Australia		South Africa	
ODIs	T20Is	ODIs	T20Is
Mitchell Marsh (c); Sean Abbott; Xavier Bartlett; Alex Carey (wk); Cooper Connolly; Ben Dwarshuis; Nathan Ellis; Cameron Green; Aaron Hardie; Josh Hazlewood; Travis Head; Josh Inglis (wk); Matthew Kuhnemann; Marnus Labuschagne; ~~Lance Morris~~; ~~Mitchell Owen~~; ~~Matthew Short~~; Adam Zampa	Mitchell Marsh (c); Sean Abbott; Alex Carey (wk); Tim David; Ben Dwarshuis; Nathan Ellis; Cameron Green; Aaron Hardie; Josh Hazlewood; Travis Head; Josh Inglis (wk); Matthew Kuhnemann; Glenn Maxwell; Mitchell Owen; ~~Matthew Short~~; Adam Zampa	Temba Bavuma (c); Corbin Bosch; Matthew Breetzke (wk); Dewald Brevis; Nandre Burger; Tony de Zorzi; Kwena Maphaka; Keshav Maharaj; Aiden Markram; Wiaan Mulder; Senuran Muthusamy; Lungi Ngidi; Lhuan-dre Pretorius (wk); ~~Kagiso Rabada~~; Ryan Rickelton (wk); Tristan Stubbs; Prenelan Subrayen	Aiden Markram (c); Corbin Bosch; Dewald Brevis; Nandre Burger; George Linde; Keshav Maharaj; Kwena Maphaka; Wiaan Mulder; Senuran Muthusamy; Lungi Ngidi; Nqaba Peter; Lhuan-dre Pretorius (wk); Kagiso Rabada; Ryan Rickelton (wk); Tristan Stubbs; Prenelan Subrayen; Rassie van der Dussen

On 10 August, Aaron Hardie was added into the T20I squad as a cover for Matthew Short. On 12 August, Alex Carey was added to the T20I squad for second and third T20Is as a cover for Josh Inglis, due to 'flu-like symptoms'. On 14 August, Lance Morris (back injury), Mitchell Owen (concussion) and Matthew Short (side injury) were ruled out of the ODI series, and were replaced by Matthew Kuhnemann, Aaron Hardie and Cooper Connolly. On 24 August, Sean Abbott was added to the squad for third ODI.

On 18 August, Kwena Maphaka was added into the ODI squad. On 19 August, Kagiso Rabada was ruled out of the ODI series due to an inflammation of his right ankle.

== T20I series ==
=== 1st T20I ===
10 August 2025
18:45 (N)
Scorecard

Australia; 178 (20 overs)	v	South Africa; 161/9 (20 overs)
Tim David 83 (52); Kwena Maphaka 4/20 (4 overs)		Ryan Rickelton 71 (55); Ben Dwarshuis 3/26 (4 overs)

Australia won by 17 runs
Marrara Oval, Darwin
Umpires: Donovan Koch (Aus) and Sam Nogajski (Aus)
Player of the match: Tim David (Aus)

- South Africa won the toss and elected to field.
- This was the first T20I to be played at the venue.

=== 2nd T20I ===
12 August 2025
18:45 (N)
Scorecard

South Africa; 218/7 (20 overs)	v	Australia; 165 (17.4 overs)
Dewald Brevis 125* (56); Ben Dwarshuis 2/24 (4 overs)		Tim David 50 (24); Corbin Bosch 3/20 (3 overs)

South Africa won by 53 runs
Marrara Oval, Darwin
Umpires: Shawn Craig (Aus) and Phillip Gillespie (Aus)
Player of the match: Dewald Brevis (SA)

- Australia won the toss and elected to field.
- Dewald Brevis recorded the highest individual score by a South Africa cricketer in T20Is (125), surpassing Faf du Plessis (119). His century was the youngest by a South Africa cricketer, and the highest individual score and fastest against Australia, in terms of balls faced, in T20Is (41).

=== 3rd T20I ===
16 August 2025
19:15 (N)
Scorecard

South Africa; 172/7 (20 overs)	v	Australia; 173/8 (19.5 overs)
Dewald Brevis 53 (26); Nathan Ellis 3/31 (4 overs)		Glenn Maxwell 62* (36); Corbin Bosch 3/26 (4 overs)

Australia won by 2 wickets
Cazalys Stadium, Cairns
Umpires: Phillip Gillespie (Aus) and Donovan Koch (Aus)
Player of the match: Glenn Maxwell (Aus)

- Australia won the toss and elected to field.
- This was the first T20I to be played at the venue.

== ODI series ==
=== 1st ODI ===
19 August 2025
14:30 (D/N)
Scorecard

South Africa; 296/8 (50 overs)	v	Australia; 198 (40.5 overs)
Aiden Markram 82 (81); Travis Head 4/57 (9 overs)		Mitchell Marsh 88 (96); Keshav Maharaj 5/33 (10 overs)

South Africa won by 98 runs
Cazalys Stadium, Cairns
Umpires: Chris Gaffaney (NZ) and Sam Nogajski (Aus)
Player of the match: Keshav Maharaj (SA)

- Australia won the toss and elected to field.
- Dewald Brevis and Prenelan Subrayen (SA) both made their ODI debuts.
- Keshav Maharaj (SA) took his first five-wicket haul in ODIs.

=== 2nd ODI ===
22 August 2025
14:30 (D/N)
Scorecard

South Africa; 277 (49.1 overs)	v	Australia; 193 (37.4 overs)
Matthew Breetzke 88 (78); Adam Zampa 3/63 (10 overs)		Josh Inglis 87 (74); Lungi Ngidi 5/42 (8.4 overs)

South Africa won by 84 runs
Great Barrier Reef Arena, Mackay
Umpires: Richard Illingworth (Eng) and Donovan Koch (Aus)
Player of the match: Lungi Ngidi (SA)

- South Africa won the toss and elected to bat.

=== 3rd ODI ===
24 August 2025
14:30 (D/N)
Scorecard

Australia; 431/2 (50 overs)	v	South Africa; 155 (24.5 overs)
Travis Head 142 (103); Keshav Maharaj 1/57 (10 overs)		Dewald Brevis 49 (28); Cooper Connolly 5/22 (6 overs)

Australia won by 276 runs
Great Barrier Reef Arena, Mackay
Umpires: Chris Gaffaney (NZ) and Sam Nogajski (Aus)
Player of the match: Travis Head (Aus)

- Australia won the toss and elected to bat.
- Cameron Green (Aus) scored his maiden century in ODIs. This was the second fastest by an Australian.
- Cooper Connolly (Aus) took his first five-wicket haul in ODIs. He became the youngest Australian bowler to take an ODI five-wicket haul, and obtained the best bowling figures in ODIs by an Australian spin bowler.
- This was South Africa's biggest loss in terms of runs and second-biggest score conceded.
- This was Australia's second highest ODI total and second biggest win in terms of runs. It was also the highest ODI total in Australia.
