= 2001 Standard Bank Triangular Tournament =

Standard Bank Triangular Tournament 2001-02
- Date: 5–26 October 2001
- Location: South Africa
- Result: South Africa won
- Player of the series: Gary Kirsten (SA)
Teams
| South Africa | India | Kenya |
Captains
| Shaun Pollock | Saurav Ganguly | Maurice Odumbe; Steve Tikolo (4th, 5th ODIs) |
Most runs
| Gary Kirsten (372) | Saurav Ganguly (380) | Thomas Odoyo (179) |
Most wickets
| Shaun Pollock (14) | Harbhajan Singh (9) | Thomas Odoyo (9) |

The 2001 Standard Bank Triangular Tournament was a One Day International (ODI) cricket tournament held in South Africa in October 2001. It was a tri-nation series between the national representative cricket teams of the South Africa, India and Kenya. The hosts South Africa won the tournament by defeating the India by six wickets in the final. Kenya caused an upset in the sixth match of the series, defeating India by 70 runs. That was Kenya's only win in the tournament though.

== Squads ==
| South Africa | India | Kenya |
|---|---|---|
| Shaun Pollock (c); Mark Boucher; Herschelle Gibbs; Nantie Hayward; Claude Henderson; Jacques Kallis; Justin Kemp; Gary Kirsten; Lance Klusener; Charl Langeveldt; Neil McKenzie; Andre Nel; Makhaya Ntini; Jonty Rhodes | Sourav Ganguly (c); Ajit Agarkar; Shiv Sundar Das; Deep Dasgupta; Rahul Dravid; Anil Kumble; VVS Laxman; Jacob Martin; Venkatesh Prasad; Virender Sehwag; Harbhajan Singh; Harvinder Singh; Yuvraj Singh; Reetinder Sodhi; Javagal Srinath; Sachin Tendulkar | Maurice Odumbe (c); Joseph Angara; Sandeep Gupta; Jimmy Kamande; Collins Obuya; David Obuya; Thomas Odoyo; Henry Olonga; Peter Ongondo; Kennedy Otieno; Brijal Patel; Steve Tikolo; Ravi Shah; Martin Suji; Tony Suji |

== Matches ==
=== 1st match ===
5 October (D/N)
Scorecard

| South Africa; 280/4 (48.2 overs) | v | India; 279/5 (50 overs) |
| Gary Kirsten 133* (155); Javagal Srinath 2/59 (10 overs) | | Saurav Ganguly 127 (126); Justin Kemp 1/40 (6 overs) |

South Africa won by 6 wickets
New Wanderers Stadium, Johannesburg
Umpires: Brian Jerling (SA) and Rudi Koertzen (SA)
Player of the match: Gary Kirsten (SA)

- South Africa won the toss and elected to field
- Shiv Sundar Das and Deep Dasgupta (both India) made their ODI debuts
- Points: South Africa 4, India 0

=== 2nd match ===
7 October
Scorecard

| Kenya; 159 (50 overs) | v | South Africa; 160/3 (33.4 overs) |
| Steve Tikolo 68* (83); Shaun Pollock 2/19 (10 overs) | | Jacques Kallis 54* (80); Thomas Odoyo 2/24 (7 overs) |

South Africa won by 7 wickets
Willowmoore Park, Benoni
Umpires: Rudi Koertzen (SA) and Barry Lambson (SA)
Player of the match: Shaun Pollock (SA)

- Kenya won the toss and elected to bat
- Points: South Africa 5, Kenya 0

=== 3rd match ===
10 October (D/N)
Scorecard

| India; 233 (48.5 overs) | v | South Africa; 192 (46.2 overs) |
| Rahul Dravid 54 (79); Shaun Pollock 5/37 (9.5 overs) | | Lance Klusener 44 (70); Harbhajan Singh 3/27 (10 overs) |

India won by 41 runs
SuperSport Park, Centurion
Umpires: Ian Howell (SA) and Brian Jerling (SA)
Player of the match: Harbhajan Singh (Ind)

- India won the toss and elected to bat
- Points: India 4, South Africa 0

=== 4th match ===
12 October (D/N)
Scorecard

| Kenya; 90 (37.1 overs) | v | India; 91/0 (11.3 overs) |
| Tony Suji 18* (47); Ajit Agarkar 4/27 (10 overs) | | Virender Sehwag 55* (43) |

India won by 10 wickets
Goodyear Park, Bloemfontein
Umpires: Dave Orchard (SA) and Shaid Wadvalla (SA)
Player of the match: Ajit Agarkar (Ind)

- Kenya won the toss and elected to bat
- Points: India 5, Kenya 0

=== 5th match ===
14 October
Scorecard

| Kenya; 229/7 (50 overs) | v | South Africa; 230/1 (41.1 overs) |
| Maurice Odumbe 60 (94); Shaun Pollock 3/41 (10 overs) | | Lance Klusener 75* (74); Brijal Patel 1/15 (3.1 overs) |

South Africa won by 9 wickets
De Beers Diamond Oval, Kimberley
Umpires: Wilf Diedricks (SA) and Dave Orchard (SA)
Player of the match: Herschelle Gibbs (SA)

- Kenya won the toss and elected to bat
- Charl Langeveldt (SA) made his ODI debut
- Points: South Africa 4, Kenya 0

=== 6th match ===
16 October (D/N)
Scorecard

| India; 246/6 (50 overs) | v | Kenya; 176 (46.4 overs) |
| Kennedy Otieno 64 (95); Harbhajan Singh 2/38 (10 overs) | | Harbhajan Singh 37 (32); Joseph Angara 3/30 (10 overs) |

Kenya won by 70 runs
Crusaders Ground, Port Elizabeth
Umpires: Brian Jerling (SA) and Dave Orchard (SA)
Player of the match: Joseph Angara (Ken)

- Kenya won the toss and elected to bat
- Points: Kenya 5, India 0

=== 7th match ===
19 October (D/N)
Scorecard

| South Africa; 282/4 (50 overs) | v | India; 236 (44.4 overs) |
| Boeta Dippenaar 81 (111); Javagal Srinath 2/55 (10 overs) | | Saurav Ganguly 85 (95); Andre Nel 3/45 (7.4 overs) |

South Africa won by 46 runs
Buffalo Park, East London
Umpires: Ian Howell (SA) and Rudi Koertzen (SA)
Player of the match: Harbhajan Singh (Ind)

- South Africa won the toss and elected to bat
- Points: South Africa 4, India 0

=== 8th match ===
22 October
Scorecard

| South Africa; 354/3 (50 overs) | v | Kenya; 146 (45.3 overs) |
| Neil McKenzie 131* (121); Brijal Patel 1/50 (7 overs) | | Thomas Odoyo 44 (56); Charl Langeveldt 4/21 (9.3 overs) |

South Africa won by 208 runs
Newlands Cricket Ground, Cape Town
Umpires: Ian Howell (SA) and Rudi Koertzen (SA)
Player of the match: Neil McKenzie (SA)

- South Africa won the toss and elected to bat
- Points: South Africa 5, Kenya 0

=== 9th match ===
24 October (D/N)
Scorecard

| India; 351/3 (50 overs) | v | Kenya; 165/5 (50 overs) |
| Sachin Tendulkar 146 (132); Thomas Odoyo 3/67 (10 overs) | | Kennedy Otieno 40 (97); Yuvraj Singh 2/35 (10 overs) |

India won by 186 runs
Boland Bank Park, Paarl
Umpires: Danzel Becker (SA) and Ian Howell (SA)
Player of the match: Sachin Tendulkar (Ind)

- India won the toss and elected to bat
- Points: India 5, Kenya 0

=== Final ===
26 October (D/N)
Scorecard

| India; 183 (48.2 overs) | v | South Africa; 187/4 (42.1 overs) |
| Rahul Dravid 77 (102); Justin Kemp 3/20 (6.2 overs) | | Gary Kirsten 87 (108); Sachin Tendulkar 2/27 (10 overs) |

South Africa won by 6 wickets
Kingsmead Cricket Ground, Durban
Umpires: Ian Howell (SA) and Dave Orchard (SA)
Player of the match: Shaun Pollock (SA)

- South Africa won the toss and elected to field
- South Africa won the tournament
