= 1997–98 Australia Tri-Nation Series =

International cricket tournament

1997–98 Carlton and United Series
- Date: 4 December 1997 – 27 January 1998
- Location: Australia
- Result: Won by Australia; 2–1 in final series
- Player of the series: Gary Kirsten (SA)
Teams
Australia	New Zealand	South Africa
Captains
Steve Waugh	Stephen Fleming	Hansie Cronje
Most runs
Ricky Ponting (462)	Stephen Fleming (281)	Gary Kirsten (452)
Most wickets
Paul Wilson (12)	Chris Cairns (12)	Allan Donald (17)

The 1997–98 Australia Tri-Nation Series (more commonly known as the 1997–98 Carlton and United Series) was a One Day International (ODI) cricket tri-series where Australia played host to New Zealand and South Africa. Australia and South Africa reached the Finals, which Australia won 2–1.

== Uniforms ==
Australia
Australia kit

New Zealand
New Zealand kit

South Africa
South Africa kit

== Squads ==
Australia	New Zealand	South Africa
Steve Waugh (c); Michael Bevan; Andy Bichel; Greg Blewett; Adam Dale; Michael Di Venuto; Adam Gilchrist; Ian Harvey; Stuart Law; Darren Lehmann; Jimmy Maher; Glenn McGrath; Tom Moody; Ricky Ponting; Paul Reiffel; Shane Warne; Mark Waugh; Paul Wilson; Bradley Young	Stephen Fleming (c); Geoff Allott; Nathan Astle; Chris Cairns; Heath Davis; Chris Drum; Simon Doull; Chris Harris; Matt Horne; Gavin Larsen; Craig McMillan; Dion Nash; Shayne O'Connor; Adam Parore; Craig Spearman; Roger Twose; Daniel Vettori; Bryan Young	Hansie Cronje (c); Paul Adams; Adam Bacher; Mark Boucher; Daryll Cullinan; Allan Donald; Herschelle Gibbs; Jacques Kallis; Gary Kirsten; Lance Klusener; Brian McMillan; Makhaya Ntini; Shaun Pollock; Jonty Rhodes; Dave Richardson; Pat Symcox

== Points table ==
Pos	Team	P	W	L	NR	T	Points	NRR
1	South Africa	8	7	1	0	0	14	0.619
2	Australia	8	3	5	0	0	6	−0.105
3	New Zealand	8	2	6	0	0	4	−0.514

== Result summary ==
=== Match 1: Australia vs. South Africa ===
4 December 1997
14:30 UTC+11 (D/N)
Scorecard

South Africa; 200 (50 overs)	v	Australia; 133 (38 overs)
Gary Kirsten 44 (69); Glenn McGrath 3/40 (10 overs)		Mark Waugh 45 (60); Pat Symcox 4/28 (10 overs)

South Africa won by 67 runs
Sydney Cricket Ground, Sydney
Attendance: 36,562
Umpires: Daryl Harper (AUS) and Steve Randell (AUS)
Player of the match: Pat Symcox (South Africa)

- South Africa won the toss and elected to bat first
- Ian Harvey (Aus) made his ODI debut.

=== Match 2: New Zealand vs. South Africa ===
6 December 1997
14:00 UTC+10:30 (D/N)
Scorecard

New Zealand; 6/224 (50 overs)	v	South Africa; 177 (47.5 overs)
Craig McMillan 86 (112); Shaun Pollock 3/36 (10 overs)		Shaun Pollock 37 (51); Chris Cairns 2/29 (9.5 overs)

New Zealand won by 47 runs
Adelaide Oval, Adelaide
Attendance: 9,642
Umpires: Ross Emerson (AUS) and Steve Davis (AUS)
Player of the match: Craig McMillan (New Zealand)

- South Africa won the toss and elected to bowl first

=== Match 3: Australia vs. New Zealand ===
7 December 1997
14:00 UTC+10:30 (D/N)
Scorecard

New Zealand; 7/260 (50 overs)	v	Australia; 7/263 (49.4 overs)
Nathan Astle 66 (84); Shane Warne 3/48 (10 overs)		Mark Waugh 104 (113); Gavin Larsen 3/56 (9.4 overs)

Australia won by 3 wickets
Adelaide Oval, Adelaide
Attendance: 30,049
Umpires: Darrell Hair (AUS) and Terry Prue (AUS)
Player of the match: Mark Waugh (Australia)

- New Zealand won the toss and elected to bat first

=== 4th match: Australia vs. South Africa ===
9 December 1997
14:30 UTC+11 (D/N)
Scorecard

South Africa; 8/170 (50 overs)	v	Australia; 125 (39.1 overs)
Jonty Rhodes 42 (71); Mark Waugh 2/39 (10 overs)		Mark Waugh 45 (76); Lance Klusener 5/24 (7.1 overs)

South Africa won by 45 runs
Melbourne Cricket Ground, Melbourne
Attendance: 55,673
Umpires: Peter Parker (AUS) and Daryl Harper (AUS)
Player of the match: Lance Klusener (South Africa)

- South Africa won the toss and elected to bat first

=== 5th match: New Zealand vs. South Africa ===
11 December 1997
10:00 UTC+11
Scorecard

South Africa; 9/174 (50 overs)	v	New Zealand; 7/173 (50 overs)
Jacques Kallis 45 (82); Chris Cairns 2/26 (10 overs)		Chris Harris 37* (50); Lance Klusener 3/46 (10 overs)

South Africa won by 1 run
Bellerive Oval, Hobart
Attendance: Unknown
Umpires: Tony McQuillan (AUS) and Steve Randell (AUS)
Player of the match: Lance Klusener (South Africa)

- South Africa won the toss and elected to bat first

=== 6th match: Australia vs. New Zealand ===
17 December 1997
14:30 UTC+11 (D/N)
Scorecard

New Zealand; 141 (49.3 overs)	v	Australia; 4/142 (38.5 overs)
Chris Harris 62* (118); Paul Wilson 3/39 (10 overs)		Ricky Ponting 60* (92); Chris Cairns 4/40 (10 overs)

Australia won by 6 wickets
Melbourne Cricket Ground, Melbourne
Attendance: 31,097
Umpires: Ross Emerson (AUS) and Darrell Hair (AUS)
Player of the match: Michael Bevan (Australia)

- New Zealand won the toss and elected to bat first
- Paul Wilson (Aus) made his ODI debut.

=== 7th match: New Zealand vs. South Africa ===
9 January 1998
13:30 UTC+10 (D/N)
Scorecard

South Africa; 6/300 (50 overs)	v	New Zealand; 9/298 (50 overs)
Gary Kirsten 103 (113); Craig McMillan 2/27 (5 overs)		Adam Parore 67 (46); Allan Donald 4/43 (10 overs)

South Africa won by 2 runs
The Gabba, Brisbane
Attendance: Unknown
Umpires: Tony McQuillan (AUS) and Steve Davis (AUS)
Player of the match: Gary Kirsten (South Africa)

- South Africa won the toss and elected to bat first

=== 8th match: Australia vs. South Africa ===
11 January 1998
13:30 UTC+10 (D/N)
Scorecard

Australia; 8/235 (50 overs)	v	South Africa; 5/236 (47.3 overs)
Michael Bevan 45* (46); Allan Donald 3/37 (10 overs)		Gary Kirsten 89 (106); Paul Wilson 2/50 (10 overs)

South Africa won by 5 wickets
The Gabba, Brisbane
Attendance: 20,671
Umpires: Peter Parker (AUS) and Daryl Harper (AUS)
Player of the match: Gary Kirsten (South Africa)

- Australia won the toss and elected to bat first

=== 9th match: Australia vs. New Zealand ===
14 January 1998
14:30 UTC+11 (D/N)

Australia; 250 (47.5 overs)	v	New Zealand; 119 (33.1 overs)
Ricky Ponting 84 (102); Shayne O'Connor 4/51 (9.5 overs)		Stephen Fleming 28 (53); Ian Harvey 3/17 (7 overs)

Australia won by 131 runs
Sydney Cricket Ground, Sydney
Attendance: Unknown
Umpires: Peter Parker (AUS) and Steve Davis
Player of the match: Ricky Ponting (Australia)

- Australia won the toss and elected to bat first
- Jimmy Maher (Aus) made his ODI debut.

=== 10th match: New Zealand vs. South Africa ===
16 January 1998
12:30 UTC+8 (D/N)
Scorecard

South Africa; 7/233 (50 overs)	v	New Zealand; 166 (45.1 overs)
Jacques Kallis 111 (140); Chris Cairns 2/50 (10 overs)		Bryan Young 34 (50); Shaun Pollock 3/28 (10 overs)

South Africa won by 67 runs
WACA Ground, Perth
Attendance: Unknown
Umpires: Ross Emerson (AUS) and Tony McQuillan (AUS)
Player of the match: Jacques Kallis (South Africa)

- South Africa won the toss and elected to bat first
- Mark Boucher and Makhaya Ntini (both RSA) made their ODI debuts.

=== 11th match: Australia vs. South Africa ===
18 January 1998
12:30 UTC+8 (D/N)
Scorecard

Australia; 165 (48.2 overs)	v	South Africa; 3/170 (28.2 overs)
Ian Harvey 43 (68); Allan Donald 4/29 (9.2 overs)		Gary Kirsten 44 (38); Paul Wilson 1/41 (9.2 overs)

South Africa won by 7 wickets
WACA Ground, Perth
Attendance: 27,052
Umpires: Darrell Hair (AUS) and Terry Prue (AUS)
Player of the match: Allan Donald (South Africa)

- Australia won the toss and elected to bat first
- Brad Young (Aus) made his ODI debut.

=== 12th match: Australia vs. New Zealand ===
21 January 1998
14:30 UTC+11 (D/N)
Scorecard

Australia; 4/251 (50 overs)	v	New Zealand; 6/253 (49.1 overs)
Ricky Ponting 100 (114); Daniel Vettori 1/41 (10 overs)		Stephen Fleming 116 (122); Paul Wilson 3/39 (10 overs)

New Zealand won by 4 wickets
Melbourne Cricket Ground, Melbourne
Attendance: 27,722
Umpires: Steve Randell (AUS) and Terry Prue (AUS)
Player of the match: Stephen Fleming (New Zealand)

- Australia won the toss and elected to bat first

== Final series ==
Australia won the best of three final series against South Africa 2–1.

=== 1st Final: Australia vs. South Africa ===
23 January 1998
14:30 UTC+11 (D/N)
Scorecard

South Africa; 9/241 (50 overs)	v	Australia; 235 (49.5 overs)
Gary Kirsten 70 (87); Shane Warne 3/52 (10 overs)		Michael Bevan 57 (68); Allan Donald 3/36 (10 overs)

South Africa won by 6 runs
Melbourne Cricket Ground, Melbourne
Attendance: 44,321
Umpires: Darrell Hair (AUS) and Steve Randell (AUS)
Player of the match: Allan Donald (South Africa)

- South Africa won the toss and elected to bat first
- South Africa led the best-of-three finals series 1–0.

=== 2nd Final: Australia vs. South Africa ===
26 January 1998
14:30 UTC+11 (D/N)
Scorecard

South Africa; 6/228 (50 overs)	v	Australia; 3/229 (41.5 overs)
Jonty Rhodes 82 (98); Paul Reiffel 3/32 (10 overs)		Adam Gilchrist 100 (104); Lance Klusener 2/57 (10 overs)

Australia won by 7 wickets
Sydney Cricket Ground, Sydney
Attendance: 26,293
Umpires: Darrell Hair (AUS) and Steve Randell (AUS)
Player of the match: Adam Gilchrist (Australia)

- South Africa won the toss and elected to bat first
- Best-of-three finals series level at 1–1.

=== 3rd Final: Australia vs. South Africa ===
27 January 1998
14:30 UTC+11 (D/N)
Scorecard

Australia; 7/247 (50 overs)	v	South Africa; 233 (48.1 overs)
Ricky Ponting 76 (96); Brian McMillan 3/47 (10 overs)		Lance Klusener 46 (42); Paul Reiffel 3/40 (9 overs)

Australia won by 14 runs
Sydney Cricket Ground, Sydney
Attendance: 19,008
Umpires: Darrell Hair (AUS) and Steve Davis (AUS)
Player of the match: Ricky Ponting (Australia)

- Australia won the toss and elected to bat first
- Australia won the best-of-three finals 2–1.
