= Gary Kirsten =

South African cricket player and coach (born 1967)

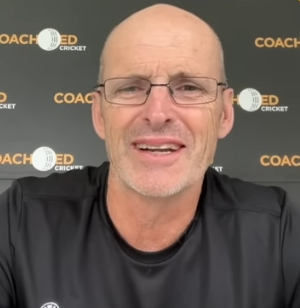
- Kirsten in 2026

Personal information
- Born: 23 November 1967 (age 58); Cape Town, Cape Province, South Africa
- Nickname: Gazza
- Batting: Left-handed
- Bowling: Right-arm off break
- Role: Opening batsman
- Relatives: Paul Kirsten (brother); Peter Kirsten (half-brother)

International information
- National side: South Africa (1993—2004)
- Test debut (cap 257): 26 December 1993 v Australia
- Last Test: 30 March 2004 v New Zealand
- ODI debut (cap 28): 14 December 1993 v Australia
- Last ODI: 3 March 2003 v Sri Lanka
- ODI shirt no.: 1

Domestic team information
- Years: Team
- 1987–2004: Western Province

Head coaching information
- Years: Team
- 2008–2011: India
- 2011–2013: South Africa
- 2024: Pakistan (ODI and T20I)
- 2026–: Sri Lanka

Career statistics
Competition	Test	ODI	FC	LA
Matches	101	185	221	294
Runs scored	7,289	6,798	16,670	9,586
Batting average	45.27	40.95	48.31	36.58
100s/50s	21/34	13/45	46/79	18/58
Top score	275	188*	275	188*
Balls bowled	349	30	1,727	138
Wickets	2	–	20	3
Bowling average	71.00	–	41.80	37.33
5 wickets in innings	0	–	1	0
10 wickets in match	0	–	0	0
Best bowling	1/0	–	6/68	1/25
Catches/stumpings	83/–	61/1	171/–	97/1
Medal record
Men's Cricket
Representing South Africa as Player
ICC Champions Trophy
Winner	1998 Bangladesh
Representing India as Coach
ICC Cricket World Cup
Winner	2011 India-Bangladesh-Sri Lanka
ACC Asia Cup
Winner	2010 Sri Lanka
Runner-up	2008 Pakistan
- Source: ESPNcricinfo, 28 December 2009

Gary Kirsten (born 23 November 1967) is a South African cricket coach and former cricketer who played as a left-handed batter. He has served as the head coach of Sri Lanka since 2026.

Kirsten played 101 Test and 185 One Day International (ODI) matches for South Africa between 1993 and 2004, mainly as an opening batter. As of June 2026, he is South Africa's fifth-highest all time run-scorer in Tests. He was a member of the South Africa team that won the 1998 ICC KnockOut Trophy. In domestic cricket, Kirsten represented Western Province between 1987 and 2004.

Following his retirement as a player, he served as the head coach of several national teams, including India from 2008 to 2011, that won the 2011 ICC Cricket World Cup, South Africa from 2011 to 2013, and Pakistan in 2024. Kirsten also served as the head coach of Hobart Hurricanes in the Big Bash League (BBL) from 2017 to 2018, as well as the head coach of Royal Challengers Bangalore in the Indian Premier League (IPL) in 2019.

== Playing career ==
Kirsten made his Test debut against Australia in Melbourne in 1993. He retired from international cricket in 2004 after crafting a match-winning 76 in his final innings, against New Zealand. Against the same country, he had made history by becoming the first-ever Protea to play in 100 Test matches.

Over the years, Kirsten gained a reputation as being a sturdy batsman in both Test cricket and One Day cricket. He could up the tempo of an innings if he needed to, but more often than not he simply waited for the bad ball in test cricket. He was also a reliable fielder. Kirsten held the South African records for most runs and centuries in a Test career, before both were surpassed by Jacques Kallis. He was the first Test batsman to make hundreds against each of the other 9 Test nations. He scored 275 runs against England as a result of batting for over 14 1/2 hours as South Africa followed on at Kingsmead in Durban, it still stands as the second-longest innings (in terms of duration) in Test history.

The high score was later surpassed by Graeme Smith when he made 277 against England in 2003. He still holds the record for highest innings by a South African in a One Day International; 188 not-out made against the United Arab Emirates during the 1996 World Cup, which is the tenth highest innings of all time in One Day International cricket, and the third-highest score in World Cup cricket history. This record stood until it was surpassed by Chris Gayle who scored 215 against Zimbabwe in 2015. Later, that record was surpassed by Martin Guptill who scored 237* against the West Indies in the quarter-finals of that very World Cup.

== Coaching career ==
=== India (2008–2011) ===
After retirement, Kirsten organised his own cricket academy. In November 2007, it emerged that Kirsten was a candidate for the vacant post of coach of the India team. The BCCI offered him a two-year contract for the post, and despite voicing reservations about concerns he had about having the full support of the Indian players, he confirmed he would be taking the job on 4 December.

Kirsten officially started as a coach on 1 March 2008. However, he travelled to Australia with India beforehand during the test series. His first full series in charge was against his home country, South Africa in March–April 2008 which was drawn 1–1. Also, he coached India to the finals of the Kitply Cup and 2008 Asia Cup (India lost both the finals). During his tenure as Coach of India, the Indian cricket team won a home series against Australia beating them 2–0. Apart from clinching the Border–Gavaskar Trophy, he also coached India to its first bilateral series win in Sri Lanka against Sri Lanka and India's first Test and One-Day International series victories against New Zealand in New Zealand after 40 years. India also won the Compaq Cup, defeating Sri Lanka in the finals on 14 September 2009 by 46 runs. A highly accomplished batsman himself, he brought in a considerable amount of improvement in the batting performances, which was largely associated with his ability to instill better confidence among younger players.

Kirsten was praised by all players for improving/enhancing their playing techniques, motivating them and discussing tactics that can be deployed on the field. The results could be clearly seen within months. He was considered the key force behind the clearly visible performance improvement in all players. In 2010, prior to the start of India's tour of South Africa, Indian captain M.S. Dhoni described him as "The best thing to happen to Indian cricket."

In 2017, Kirsten spoke to HBR about the qualities of a great coach, coaching a young team, and learning from one's mistakes. Some edited excerpts of his interview are online.

==== World Cup 2011 ====
After the tour of South Africa, which India drew 1–1 in the Test series and lost 3–2 in ODIs, the BCCI announced that Kirsten would not renew his contract because of family commitments. Kirsten had often stated that he wanted to spend time with his two growing sons, Joshua and James, and his wife. He had also stated that he felt three years away from home was long enough. Immediately after the announcement Kirsten was linked with joining South Africa as their coach as the South Africa coach Corrie van Zyl had also announced that his contract would end after the World Cup.

Kirsten ended his tenure as coach after India won the 2011 Cricket World Cup defeating Sri Lanka by 6 wickets and 10 balls to spare on 2 April 2011 at Wankhede Stadium in Mumbai, India. During the celebration, he was carried around the ground by Suresh Raina, Yusuf Pathan and Virat Kohli to show their respect.

=== South Africa (2011–2013) ===
On 5 June 2011, Kirsten was appointed the full-time coach of the South Africa national cricket team for a term period of two years. His first decision was to name AB de Villiers as the new captain for the limited-overs game, replacing Graeme Smith who remained the Test side captain. Kirsten began his term as a coach on 1 August and his first assignment was a home series against Australia. He took over from Corrie van Zyl, who was an interim coach for 14 months after Mickey Arthur resigned following the home series against England in 2009–10. Under Kirsten, in August 2012, the South African team reached number 1 in the ICC Test rankings, by defeating England 2–0.

Kirsten did not renew his contract with Cricket South Africa (CSA) and stepped down as the coach of the national team in August 2013 citing family commitments.

=== Hobart Hurricanes (2017–2018) ===
On 3 April 2017, Kirsten was appointed head coach of the men's Hobart Hurricanes cricket team. The Hobart Hurricanes are Tasmania's professional T20 cricket club in the Australian Big Bash League.

=== Royal Challengers Bangalore (2018–2019) ===
In January 2018, Royal Challengers Bangalore appointed Kirsten as their batting coach. In August 2018, he was appointed as head coach of RCB following the sacking of their previous coach Daniel Vettori for the 2019 Indian Premier League .

=== Gujarat Titans (2022–2024) ===
In January 2022, Kirsten was appointed batting coach and mentor of newly formed Gujarat Titans.

=== Pakistan (2024) ===
In April 2024, the Pakistan Cricket Board (PCB) announced Kristen as the head coach of Pakistan national cricket team in the limited overs cricket for a two-year period. In October 2024, he resigned from his position over differences with the PCB on the merit selection of squads.

=== Namibia (2026) ===
In February 2026, Kirsten joined the Namibia national cricket team as a consultant for their 2026 ICC Men's T20 World Cup campaign, specifically providing strategic insight into Indian playing conditions.

=== Sri Lanka (2026) ===
On 9 March 2026, Sri Lanka Cricket announced that Kirsten would take over as head coach of the Sri Lanka national cricket team on a two-year contract commencing on 15 April 2026.

== Business interests ==
In 2007, Kirsten joined Paddy Upton and Dale Williams to form a company called Performance Zone. The focus of the company is to work with individuals and teams in business and sport, bringing out their clients' best performance. When Kirsten was appointed Indian coach and Upton as Indian mental conditioning coach on a two-year contract, they decided to continue the business. Its first project post Kirsten taking on the Indian coach role has been the creation of garykirsten.com.

Sporting positions
Preceded by Chandu Borde	Head coach of Indian national cricket team 2008–2011	Succeeded by Duncan Fletcher
