= 1998 KnockOut Trophy final =

1998 ICC Champions Trophy Final
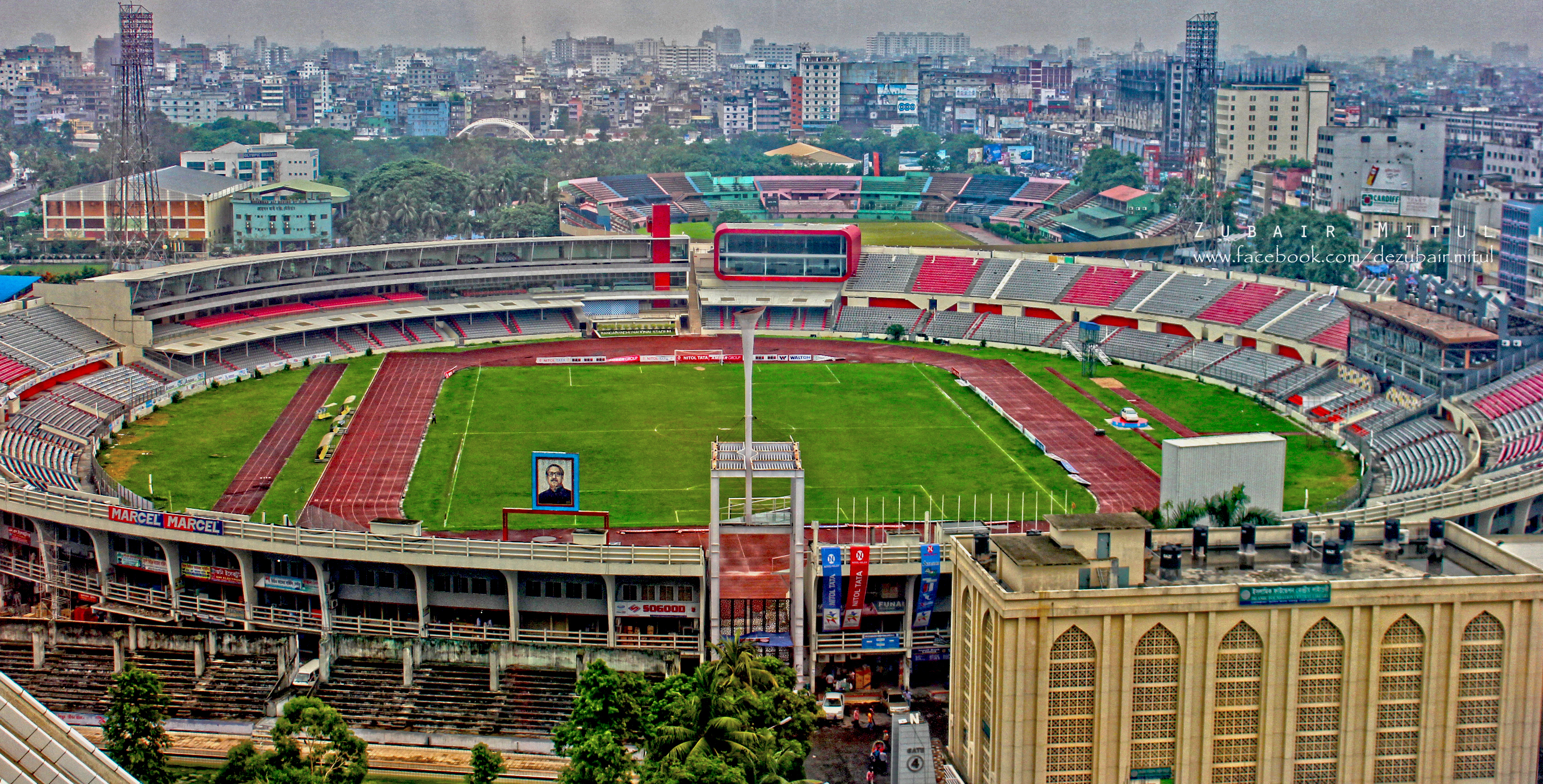
- The final took place inside a jam-packed Bangabandhu National Stadium
West Indies	South Africa
(Cricket West Indies)	(South Africa)
245	248/6
49.3 overs	47 overs
- Date: 1 November 1998
- Venue: Bangabandhu National Stadium, Dhaka
- Player of the match: Jacques Kallis (SA)
- Umpires: Steve Dunne (NZ) and David Shepherd (Eng)
- Attendance: 40,000

The 1998 ICC KnockOut Trophy (officially known as Wills International Cup) was a One Day International (ODI) cricket tournament held in Bangladesh. It was the first tournament apart from the World Cups to involve all Test playing nations. The winners of the Knock-out stage—India, South Africa, Sri Lanka and Indies—reached the semi-finals. South Africa made their way to the final by defeating Sri Lanka in the first semi-final by 92 runs; the match was reduced to 39 overs per innings due to rain. In the second semi-final, West Indies defeated India by six wickets, and qualified for the final.

The tournament's final was played on 1 November 1998 at the Bangabandhu National Stadium, Dhaka. West Indies scored 245 all out in 49.3 overs; Philo Wallace scored 103 runs and Jacques Kallis took five wickets for 30 runs. South Africa achieved the target in 47 overs losing 6 wickets. Hansie Cronje and Mike Rindel scored 61* and 49 runs respectively. South Africa won the inaugural edition of the tournament by four wickets. Kallis was named man of the match in the final, and man of the tournament.

== Route to the final ==
=== Knock-out stage ===
A total of eight matches were played in the tournament. The opening match was a pre-quarterfinal, played between New Zealand and Zimbabwe on 24 October 1998. New Zealand won the match and made their way to the quarterfinals where they faced Sri Lanka. South Africa, Sri Lanka, India and West Indies defeated England, New Zealand, Australia and Pakistan respectively in the quarterfinals, and qualified for the semi-finals.

=== Semi-finals ===
The first semi-final was played between South Africa and Sri Lanka on 30 October 1998 in Dhaka. On the rainy day, the match was initially reduced to 39 overs per innings, and Sri Lanka, who had won toss, invited South Africa bat to first. South Africa scored 240 runs for 7 wickets in their 39-over innings. Jacques Kallis scored 113 runs from 100 balls, and remained not out. The Sri Lankan innings was further reduced to 34 overs and the revising target was 224 runs. They were all out for 132 in 23.1 overs, and their highest scorer was Sanath Jayasuriya with 22 runs. South Africa won the match by 92 runs applying the Duckworth–Lewis method (D/L method). Kallis was awarded the man of the match for his performance.

West Indies played India in the second semi-final of the tournament on 31 October 1998 in Dhaka. Indian captain, Mohammad Azharuddin won the toss and decided to bat first. Mervyn Dillon took the early wickets of Sachin Tendulkar and Azharuddin. India scored 242 runs for 6 wickets in 50 overs, including Sourav Ganguly's 83 runs from 116 balls. Dillon finished with 3 wickets for 38 runs in 8 overs. West Indies started their innings aggressively, reaching 100 runs in 15 overs. They achieved the target in 47 overs losing 4 wickets. Shivnarine Chanderpaul and Brian Lara scored 74 and 60 not out respectively. Dillon was named the man of the match.

== Build up ==
Prior to the start of the competition, India and Sri Lanka, along with Pakistan, were suggested as the most likely winners of the competition. South Africa and West Indies were not considered among the favourites in the start of the tournament. South Africa started their campaign without their key players: Shaun Pollock, Allan Donald, Lance Klusener, Gary Kirsten and Roger Telemachus. Pollack and Kirsten withdrew from the team because of back and finger injuries respectively. West Indies replaced their leading fast bowler Curtly Ambrose with Reon King, who made his debut in the tournament.

== Match ==
=== Summary ===
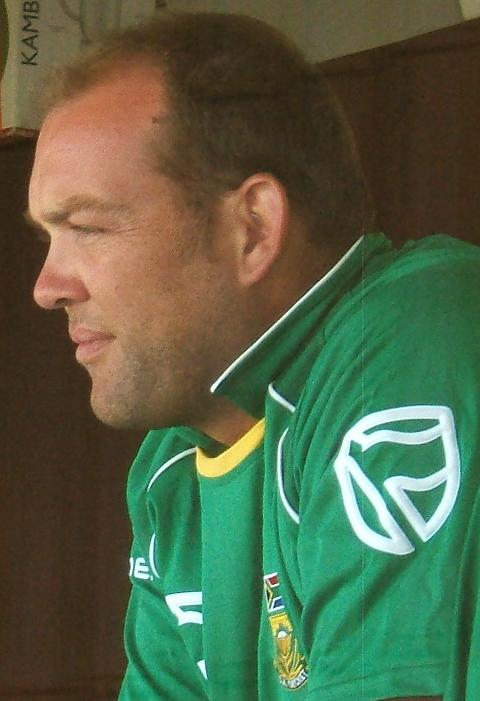
Jacques Kallis was awarded the man of the match and the man of the series.

The final of the inaugural edition was played between South Africa and West Indies on 1 November 1998 at Bangabandhu National Stadium, Dhaka. South Africa won the toss and decided to field first. Philo Wallace and Clayton Lambert opened the after West Indian innings whereas South Africa started their bowling attack with off-spiner Pat Symcox and Steve Elworthy. West Indies lost their first wicket in the sixth over at 18 runs when Lambert was caught by Symcox at mid-wicket off the bowling of Elworthy. The next batsman, Chanderpaul, shared 76 runs – the highest partnership of the match – with Wallace taking the total to 94. Chanderpaul made 27 runs in 54 balls at a strike rate of 50.00. He was dismissed leg before wicket (lbw), becoming the maiden wicket of Nicky Boje in the match. Before the drinks break, Symcox had completed his 10 overs conceding only 29 runs without taking a wicket. Wallace completed his century off 98 deliveries; he scored 103 runs from 102 balls including five sixes and 11 fours. His second fifty came up in 26 deliveries, and shared 55 runs with Carl Hooper for the fourth wicket. Wallace was dropped twice in his innings by Jonty Rhodes. He was stumped by Mark Boucher off the bowling of Cronje. South Africa were 180 runs for four wicket at that moment. Hooper continued his innings and shared 13 and 20 runs for the fifth and sixth wicket with Keith Arthurton and Phil Simmons respectively; both of the latters scored eight runs each. Arthurton was dismissed lbw whereas Hooper and Simmons were caught by Rhodes off the bowling of Kallis. Hooper made 49 runs in 56 balls including four fours. West Indies scored 245 all out in 49.3 overs with their last seven players adding only 65 runs to the total. Kallis achieved his career-best bowling figures of five wickets for 30 runs in 7.3 overs whereas Cronje took two wickets.

Mike Rindel and Daryll Cullinan opened the South African innings with a positive approach. Rindel was edged twice to the second slip by Dillon. South Africa were 34 at the end of the fifth over. West Indian captain Brian Lara then introduced Hooper into the bowling attack. In his second over, Cullinan was run out on 21 by Arthurton; the team total was 54 runs at that moment. Boucher, promoted in the order, was beaten on the leg-side by Hooper, and stumped by Ridley Jacobs. The next batsman, Kallis, scored 37 runs from 51 balls hitting four fours and a six. He was caught and bowled by Simmons. South African captain then joined Rindel on the crease. In the 26th over, a direct throw from Arthurton resulted in the end of Rindel's innings who was one short of his fifty. The next batsman, Rhodes was caught behind on a fuller from Simmons, scoring 3 runs in 9 balls. After the dismissal of Rhodes, Dale Benkenstein joined Cronje on the crease. He shared a partnership of 74 runs with Cronje for the sixth wicket. Benkenstein scored 27 runs before caught by Hooper at short mid-on off the bowling of Dillon. Cronje and Derek Crookes scored 61 and 24 (both not out) respectively; South Africa achieved the target in 47 overs. Simmons took two wickets for 45 runs while Dillon and Hooper got one wicket each. Kallis was given the man of the match award for his all-round performance. He was the highest wicket-taker of the tournament with 6 wicket, and second highest run-scorer with 164 from 3 innings. He was also named the man of the tournament. With this victory, South Africa won the inaugural edition of the ICC Knock-out Trophy.

1 November
Scorecard

West Indies; 245 (49.3 overs)	v	South Africa; 248/6 (47 overs)
Philo Wallace 103 (102); Jacques Kallis 5/30 (7.3 overs)		Hansie Cronje 61* (77); Phil Simmons 2/45 (8 overs)

South Africa won by 4 wickets
Bangabandhu National Stadium, Dhaka
Umpires: Steve Dunne (NZ) and Peter Willey (Eng)
Player of the match: Jacques Kallis (SA)

- South Africa won the toss and elected to field.
- This is the only senior ICC event won by South Africa until 2025.

== Scorecard ==
West Indies batting
Player	Status	Runs	Balls	4s	6s	Strike rate
Philo Wallace	st †Boucher b Cronje	103	102	11	5	100.98
Clayton Lambert	c Symcox b Elworthy	7	12	0	1	58.33
Shivnarine Chanderpaul	lbw b Boje	27	54	2	0	50.00
Brian Lara *	b Crookes	11	9	0	1	122.22
Carl Hooper	c Rhodes b Kallis	49	56	4	0	87.50
Keith Arthurton	lbw b Kallis	8	14	1	0	57.14
Phil Simmons	c Rhodes b Kallis	8	13	1	0	61.53
Ridley Jacobs †	c Rhodes b Cronje	14	21	0	0	66.66
Rawl Lewis	lbw b Kallis	0	1	0	0	0.00
Reon King	lbw b Kallis	7	15	0	0	46.66
Mervyn Dillon	not out	0	0	0	0	–
Extras	(lb 4, w 7)	11				
Total	(all out; 49.3 overs)	245				

Fall of wickets: 1/18 (Lambert, 5.1 ov), 2/94 (Chanderpaul, 23.4 ov), 3/125 (Lara, 26.5 ov), 4/180 (Wallace, 34.4 ov), 5/193 (Arthurton, 37.6 ov), 6/213 (Simmons, 41.5 ov), 7/232 (Hooper, 45.4 ov), 8/232 (Lewis, 45.5 ov), 9/243 (Jacobs, 48.6 ov), 10/245 (King, 49.3 ov)

South Africa bowling
Bowler	Overs	Maidens	Runs	Wickets	Econ	Wides	NBs
Pat Symcox	10	0	29	0	2.90	0	0
Steve Elworthy	7	0	48	1	6.85	1	0
Nicky Boje	10	1	44	1	4.40	1	0
Michael Rindel	2	0	13	0	6.50	0	0
Derek Crookes	3	0	33	1	11.00	2	0
Hansie Cronje	10	0	44	2	4.40	1	0
Jacques Kallis	7.3	0	30	5	4.00	1	0

South Africa batting
Player	Status	Runs	Balls	4s	6s	Strike rate
Daryll Cullinan	run out (Arthurton)	21	25	4	0	84.00
Michael Rindel	run out (Arthurton)	49	56	6	0	87.50
Mark Boucher †	st †Jacobs b Hooper	4	6	0	0	66.66
Jacques Kallis	c & b Simmons	37	51	4	1	72.54
Hansie Cronje *	not out	61	77	4	0	79.22
Jonty Rhodes	c †Jacobs b Simmons	3	9	0	0	33.33
Dale Benkenstein	c Hooper b Dillon	27	40	2	0	67.50
Derek Crookes	not out	24	21	3	0	114.28
Nicky Boje	did not bat					
Pat Symcox	did not bat					
Steve Elworthy	did not bat					
Extras	(b 3, lb 3, nb 3, w 13)	22				
Total	(6 wickets; 47 overs)	248				

Fall of wickets: 1/54 (Cullinan, 7.3 ov), 2/60 (Boucher, 9.2 ov), 3/118 (Kallis, 20.4 ov), 4/134 (Rindel, 25.1 ov), 5/137 (Rhodes, 26.5 ov), 6/211 (Benkenstein, 41.2 ov)

West Indies bowling
Bowler	Overs	Maidens	Runs	Wickets	Econ	Wides	NBs
Mervyn Dillon	10	0	53	1	5.30	4	0
Reon King	10	0	42	0	4.20	2	0
Carl Hooper	10	1	45	1	4.50	2	0
Phil Simmons	8	0	45	2	5.62	2	1
Rawl Lewis	9	0	57	0	6.33	0	2

Key

- * – Captain
- † – Wicket-keeper
- c Fielder – the batsman was dismissed by a catch by the named fielder
- b Bowler – the bowler who gains credit for the dismissal
- lbw – the batsman was dismissed leg before wicket
- Total runs are in the format: score/wickets

== Aftermath ==
The South African team received US$100,000 and a trophy for being the champions. Sheikh Hasina, the Prime Minister of Bangladesh, handed over the trophy and the cash award. Cronje said: "it feels good to win this tough tournament. There were no second chances in this knock-out format, so I think we did well to play three good matches. We knew we were among the top there, but this has renewed our confidence for next year's World Cup." The West Indian team received US$60,000 for being the runners-up. Lara said: "not many expected us to reach the final but we showed we were good enough for that. I am happy the boys fought till the end, it was a very close game. It's all about taking your chances and the South Africans took theirs well and deserved to win."
