= 1999–2000 Coca-Cola Cup =

1999–00 Coca-Cola Cup
- Date: 22–31 March 2000
- Location: Sharjah, United Arab Emirates
- Result: Won by Pakistan
- Player of the series: Waqar Younis (Pak)
Teams
Pakistan	South Africa	India
Captains
Moin Khan	Hansie Cronje	Sourav Ganguly
Most runs
Inzamam-ul-Haq (239) Imran Nazir (194)	Herschelle Gibbs (159); Hansie Cronje (135)	Mohammad Azharuddin (117); Rahul Dravid (89)
Most wickets
Waqar Younis (13) Arshad Khan (8)	Lance Klusener (11); Steve Elworthy (6)	Venkatesh Prasad (4); Anil Kumble (4)

The 1999–2000 Coca-Cola Cup was a triangular ODI cricket competition held in Sharjah, United Arab Emirates from 22 to 31 March 2000. It featured the national cricket teams of South Africa, Pakistan and India. Its official sponsor was Coca-Cola. The tournament was won by Pakistan, who defeated South Africa in the final.

== Points table ==
Team	Pld	W	L	T	NR	NRR	Pts
South Africa	4	3	1	0	0	+0.354	6
Pakistan	4	2	2	0	0	+0.596	4
India	4	1	3	0	0	−1.014	2

== Group stage ==
=== 1st ODI ===
22 March (D/N)
Scorecard

India; 164 (50 overs)	v	South Africa; 0/168 (29.2 overs)
Ajay Jadeja 43* (79); Steve Elworthy 3/17 (10 overs)		Herschelle Gibbs 87* (93)

South Africa won by 10 wickets
Sharjah Cricket Association Stadium, Sharjah
Umpires: Daryl Harper (Aus) and John Hampshire (Eng)
Player of the match: Steve Elworthy (SA)

- India won the toss and elected to bowl.

=== 2nd ODI ===
23 March (D/N)
Scorecard

Pakistan; 146 (45.3 overs)	v	India; 5/148 (43.3 overs)
Imran Nazir 43 (51); Anil Kumble 2/26 (10 overs)		Mohammad Azharuddin 54 (89); Shoaib Akhtar 1/18 (8 overs)

India won by 5 wickets
Sharjah Cricket Association Stadium, Sharjah
Umpires: John Hampshire (Eng) and Peter Manuel (SL)
Player of the match: Mohammad Azharuddin (Ind)

- Pakistan won the toss and elected to bat.

=== 3rd ODI ===
24 March (D/N)
Scorecard

Pakistan; 8/196 (50 overs)	v	South Africa; 7/199 (44.3 overs)
Imran Nazir 71 (114); Lance Klusener 5/47 (10 overs)		Jacques Kallis 35(38); Waqar Younis 2/28 (7 overs)

South Africa won by 3 wickets
Sharjah Cricket Association Stadium, Sharjah
Umpires: Daryl Harper (Aus) and Peter Manuel (SL)
Player of the match: Lance Klusener (SA)

- Pakistan won the toss and elected to bat.

=== 4th ODI ===
26 March (D/N)
Scorecard

Pakistan; 3/272 (50 overs)	v	India; 9/174 (50 overs)
Inzamam-ul-Haq 121* (113); Sunil Joshi 1/42 (9 overs)		Rahul Dravid 29 (46); Waqar Younis 5/31 (10 overs)

Pakistan won by 98 runs
Sharjah Cricket Association Stadium, Sharjah
Umpires: Daryl Harper (Aus) and Peter Manuel (SL)
Player of the match: Waqar Younis and Inzamam-ul-Haq (Pak)

- Pakistan won the toss and elected to bat.

=== 5th ODI ===
27 March (D/N)
Scorecard

India; 164 (48.5 overs)	v	South Africa; 4/167 (42.4 overs)
Mohammad Azharuddin 36 (65); Nantie Hayward 4/31 (10 overs)		Jacques Kallis 53* (93)

South Africa won by 6 wickets
Sharjah Cricket Association Stadium, Sharjah
Umpires: Daryl Harper (Aus) and John Hampshire (Eng)
Player of the match: Nantie Hayward (SA)

- India won the toss and elected to bat.

=== 6th ODI ===
28 March (D/N)
Scorecard

Pakistan; 168 (49.2 overs)	v	South Africa; 101 (26.5 overs)
Mohammad Yousuf 65 (88); Lance Klusener 2/27 (10 overs)		Herschelle Gibbs 59* (79); Shoaib Akhtar 3/9 (4.5 overs)

Pakistan won by 67 runs
Sharjah Cricket Association Stadium, Sharjah
Umpires: John Hampshire (Eng) and Peter Manuel (SL)
Player of the match: Shoaib Akhtar (Pak)

- Pakistan won the toss and elected to bat.
- Waqar took his 300th ODI wicket when he trapped Mckenzie LBW

== Final ==
31 March (D/N)
Scorecard

Pakistan; 6/263 (50 overs)	v	South Africa; 247 (49 overs)
Imran Nazir 69 (89); Lance Klusener 2/27 (10 overs)		Hansie Cronje 79 (73); Waqar Younis 4/62 (10 overs)

Pakistan won by 16 runs
Sharjah Cricket Association Stadium, Sharjah
Umpires: Daryl Harper (Aus) and Peter Manuel (SL)
Player of the match: Waqar Younis (Pak)

- Pakistan won the toss and elected to bat.
