= Derek Crookes =

South African cricketer (born 1969)

Personal information
- Batting: Right-handed
- Bowling: Right-arm off break
- Relatives: Norman Crookes (father)

Domestic team information
- Years: Team
- 1989/90–1996/97: Natal
- 1997/98–1999/00: Gauteng
- 2000/01–2002/03: Easterns
- 2003/04–2004/05: Lions
- 2003/04–2004/05: Gauteng

Career statistics
Competition	ODI
Matches	32
Runs scored	296
Batting average	14.80
100s/50s	0/1
Top score	54
Balls bowled	1,221
Wickets	25
Bowling average	40.43
5 wickets in innings	0
10 wickets in match	0
Best bowling	3/30
Catches/stumpings	20/–
Medal record
Representing South Africa
Men's Cricket
Commonwealth Games
Gold medal – first place	1998 Kuala Lumpur	List-A cricket
- Source: Cricinfo, 7 March 2006

Derek Norman Crookes (born 5 March 1969) is a former South African cricketer who played 32 One Day Internationals for South Africa between 1994 and 2000. In domestic cricket he played for Natal, Gauteng, Easterns and the Highveld Lions. Crookes was a member of the South Africa team that won the 1998 ICC KnockOut Trophy, the first ICC trophy that South Africa won, where he scored the winning boundary in the final.

He was educated at Hilton College.

His father, Norman Crookes, was an off-spinning all-rounder who played for Natal in the 1960s and toured England with the South African team in 1965, but did not play a Test.
