= List of international cricket five-wicket hauls by Curtly Ambrose =

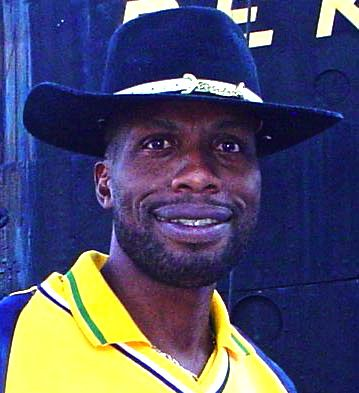
Curtly Ambrose has taken the most five-wicket hauls for the West Indies.

Curtly Ambrose, a former West Indian cricketer, took 26 five-wicket hauls at international level. In cricket, a five-wicket haul (also known as a "five–for" or "fifer") refers to a bowler taking five or more wickets in a single innings. This is regarded as a notable achievement, and as of October 2024, only 54 bowlers have taken 15 or more five-wicket hauls at international level in their cricketing careers. Ambrose played 98 Tests and 176 One Day Internationals (ODIs), and took 405 and 225 wickets respectively. A right-arm fast bowler who represented the West Indies from 1988 to 2000, he took 22 five-wicket hauls in Tests and 4 in ODIs. The cricket almanack Wisden noted his "smooth, leggy run-up, fast arm action and accuracy", apart from "lethal yorker[s]" and "nasty bouncer[s]", and named him one of their Cricketers of the Year in 1992. Upon his induction into the International Cricket Council Cricket Hall of Fame in September 2011, Cricinfo described Ambrose as "one of the finest bowlers of all time", and as of 2013 he is tenth overall among all-time combined five-wicket haul takers.

Ambrose made his Test debut in 1988 against Pakistan at the Bourda, Georgetown, a match the West Indies lost by 9 wickets. His first five-wicket haul came eight months later against Australia at the WACA Ground, Perth; West Indies won the match by 169 runs. His career-best bowling figures for an innings were 8 wickets for 45 runs against England at the Kensington Oval, Bridgetown, in April 1990 where his match-winning performance earned him a man of the match award. Ambrose took his solitary pair of five-wicket hauls in a Test match—5 wickets for 60 runs and 6 wickets for 24 runs—against the same opponents at the Queen's Park Oval, Port of Spain, in March 1994, his best bowling performance in a Test match. Ambrose achieved his 22 five-wicket hauls at 12 different grounds, including 11 at 9 different venues outside the West Indies. He was most successful against Australia and England taking eight five-wicket hauls each. He took ten or more wickets in a match on three occasions.

Ambrose made his ODI debut against Pakistan at the Sabina Park, Kingston, in March 1988. His first five-wicket haul in this format came later that year against Australia at the Melbourne Cricket Ground, where he took 5 wickets for 17 runs in the match, his best performance in ODI matches. Ambrose took three of his four one-day five-wicket hauls against Australia and one against Pakistan. As of 2013, he is joint tenth—with Dale Steyn—overall among all-time combined five-wicket haul takers.

== Key ==
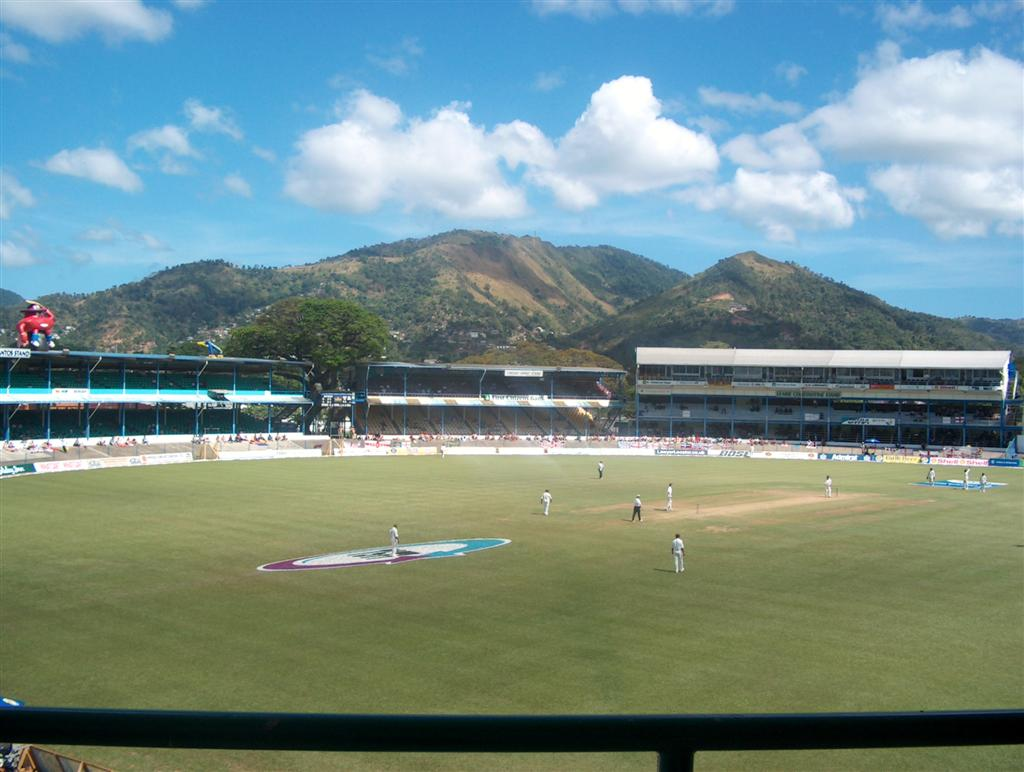
The Queen's Park Oval in Port of Spain, where Ambrose took six Test five-wicket hauls, the most by any player at the ground.

Symbol	Meaning
Date	Date the match was held, or starting date of the match for Test matches
Inn	The innings of the match in which the five-wicket haul was taken
Overs	Number of overs bowled in that innings
Runs	Runs conceded
Wkts	Number of wickets taken
Batsmen	The batsmen whose wickets were taken in the five-wicket haul
Econ	Bowling economy rate (average runs per over)
Result	The result for the West Indies team in that match
*	One of two five-wicket hauls by Ambrose in a match
†	Ambrose selected as "Man of the match"
‡	10 wickets or more taken in the match
Drawn	The match was drawn

== Tests ==
Five-wicket hauls in Test cricket by Curtly Ambrose
No.	Date	Ground	Against	Inn	Overs	Runs	Wkts	Econ	Batsmen	Result
1	2 December 1988	WACA Ground, Perth	Australia	2	23.3	72	5	3.06	David Boon; Graeme Wood; Allan Border; Steve Waugh; Tim May	Won
2	5 April 1990†‡	Kensington Oval, Bridgetown	England	4	22.4	45	8	1.98	Alec Stewart; Rob Bailey; Gladstone Small; Jack Russell; Nasser Hussain; David Capel; Phillip DeFreitas; Devon Malcolm	Won
3	6 December 1990	Gaddafi Stadium, Lahore	Pakistan	2	20	35	5	1.75	Zahid Fazal; Rameez Raja; Imran Khan; Wasim Akram; Moin Khan	Drawn
4	6 June 1991	Headingley, Leeds	England	3	28	52	6	1.85	Michael Atherton; Graeme Hick; Allan Lamb; Mark Ramprakash; Robin Smith; Jack Russell	Lost
5	4 July 1991†	Trent Bridge, Nottingham	England	1	34	74	5	2.17	Michael Atherton; Graeme Hick; Allan Lamb; Mark Ramprakash; Richard Illingworth	Won
6	18 April 1992† (Note: The man of the match award was shared between Ambrose and Hudson.)	Kensington Oval, Bridgetown	South Africa	4	24.4	34	6	1.37	Andrew Hudson; Mark Rushmere; Hansie Cronje; Dave Richardson; Meyrick Pringle; Allan Donald	Won
7	27 November 1992	The Gabba, Brisbane	Australia	3	32	66	5	2.06	Steve Waugh; Mark Waugh; Damien Martyn; Greg Matthews; Merv Hughes	Drawn
8	23 January 1993†‡	Adelaide Oval, Adelaide	Australia	2	28.2	74	6	2.61	Mark Waugh; Steve Waugh; Allan Border; Ian Healy; Tim May; Craig McDermott	Won
9	30 January 1993†	WACA Ground, Perth	Australia	1	18	25	7	1.38	David Boon; Mark Waugh; Damien Martyn; Allan Border; Ian Healy; Merv Hughes; Jo Angel	Won
10	25 March 1994*†‡	Queen's Park Oval, Port of Spain	England	2	29	60	5	2.06	Alec Stewart; Robin Smith; Graham Thorpe; Jack Russell; Chris Lewis	Won
11	25 March 1994*†‡	Queen's Park Oval, Port of Spain	England	4	10	24	6	2.40	Michael Atherton; Alec Stewart; Robin Smith; Graeme Hick; Graham Thorpe; Jack Russell	Won
12	21 April 1995†	Queen's Park Oval, Port of Spain	Australia	1	16	45	5	2.81	Mark Taylor; David Boon; Mark Waugh; Shane Warne; Glenn McGrath	Won
13	24 August 1995	The Oval, London	England	1	42	96	5	2.28	Jason Gallian; Graham Thorpe; Alan Wells; Jack Russell; Dominic Cork	Drawn
14	27 April 1996	Antigua Recreation Ground, St. John's	New Zealand	2	32	68	5	2.12	Roger Twose; Danny Morrison; Nathan Astle; Chris Harris; Lee Germon	Drawn
15	26 December 1996†	Melbourne Cricket Ground, Melbourne	Australia	1	24.5	55	5	2.21	Mark Taylor; Matthew Hayden; Mark Waugh; Ian Healy; Glenn McGrath	Won
16	1 February 1997†	WACA Ground, Perth	Australia	1	18	43	5	2.38	Matthew Hayden; Mark Waugh; Steve Waugh; Ian Healy; Paul Reiffel	Won
17	14 March 1997	Queen's Park Oval, Port of Spain	India	2	41.4	87	5	2.08	V.V.S. Laxman; Navjot Singh Sidhu; Rahul Dravid; Mohammad Azharuddin; Sunil Joshi	Drawn
18	13 June 1997†	Antigua Recreation Ground, St. John's	Sri Lanka	1	13.1	37	5	2.81	Roshan Mahanama; Russel Arnold; Aravinda de Silva; Kumar Dharmasena; Sajeewa de Silva	Won
19	5 February 1998†	Queen's Park Oval, Port of Spain	England	3	19.5	52	5	2.62	Adam Hollioake; Jack Russell; Andy Caddick; Angus Fraser; Phil Tufnell	Won
20	13 February 1998	Queen's Park Oval, Port of Spain	England	2	15.4	25	5	1.59	Michael Atherton; John Crawley; Dean Headley; Angus Fraser; Phil Tufnell	Lost
21	10 December 1998	St George's Oval, Port Elizabeth	South Africa	3	19	51	6	2.68	Herschelle Gibbs; Jacques Kallis; Jonty Rhodes; Shaun Pollock; Mark Boucher; Pat Symcox	Lost
22	3 April 1999	Antigua Recreation Ground, St. John's	Australia	1	29.5	94	5	3.15	Ricky Ponting; Ian Healy; Adam Dale; Stuart MacGill; Glenn McGrath	Won

== One Day Internationals ==
Five-wicket hauls in ODI cricket by Curtly Ambrose
No.	Date	Ground	Against	Inn	Overs	Runs	Wkts	Econ	Batsmen	Result
1	15 December 1988†	Melbourne Cricket Ground, Melbourne	Australia	2	8.2	17	5	2.04	Geoff Marsh; Mark Waugh; Peter Taylor; Craig McDermott; Terry Alderman	Won
2	14 January 1989	Melbourne Cricket Ground, Melbourne	Australia	1	10	26	5	2.60	Geoff Marsh; David Boon; Allan Border; Steve Waugh; Merv Hughes	Lost
3	21 October 1991†	Sharjah Cricket Association Stadium, Sharjah (neutral venue)	Pakistan	1	10	53	5	5.30	Rameez Raja; Sajid Ali; Javed Miandad; Imran Khan; Moin Khan	Lost
4	16 January 1993†	Sydney Cricket Ground, Sydney	Australia	2	9.3	32	5	3.36	Mark Taylor; David Boon; Ian Healy; Tony Dodemaide; Craig McDermott	Won
