= Hansie =

2008 film

Hansie: A True Story
- Promotional Poster
- Journey to Grace
- Directed by: Regardt van den Bergh
- Produced by: Frans Cronje
- Starring: Frank Rautenbach; Sarah Thompson
- Distributed by: Global Creative Studios
- Release date: 24 September 2008
- Country: South Africa

Hansie: A True Story (Note: Also known as Journey to Grace: The Hansie Cronje Story) is a 2008 South African film produced by Global Creative Studios and directed by Regardt van den Bergh. It is based on the life of Hansie Cronje. The film was released on 24 September 2008 in South African cinemas.
