= Dennis Crookes =

South African cricketer and businessman

Personal information
- Full name: Dennis Victor Crookes
- Born: 18 June 1931 (age 95); Berea, Durban, Natal, South Africa
- Batting: Right-handed
- Bowling: Right-arm leg-spin
- Relatives: Norman Crookes (brother)

Domestic team information
- Years: Team
- 1953–1954: Cambridge University

Career statistics
Competition	First-class
Matches	11
Runs scored	227
Batting average	17.46
100s/50s	0/0
Top score	33
Balls bowled	143
Wickets	3
Bowling average	41.66
5 wickets in innings	0
10 wickets in match	0
Best bowling	1/0
Catches/stumpings	4/–
- Source: Cricinfo, 31 August 2019

Dennis Victor Crookes (born 18 June 1931) is a former South African cricketer and businessman who played first-class cricket for Cambridge University in 1953 and 1954.

Dennis Crookes was educated at Michaelhouse in Natal and Jesus College, Cambridge. After his studies at Cambridge he returned to Natal, where he worked for CG Smith Sugar later Illovo Sugar, and served the family sugar-growing company Crookes Brothers as chairman from 1993 to 1998.
