= Michael Rindel =

South African cricketer (born 1963)

Cricket information
- Batting: Left-handed
- Bowling: Orthodox left-arm spin
Medal record
Representing South Africa
Men's Cricket
Commonwealth Games
Gold medal – first place	1998 Kuala Lumpur	List-A cricket
- Source: Cricinfo, 7 March 2006

Michael John Raymond Rindel (born 9 February 1963) is a former international cricketer who played 22 One Day Internationals for South Africa from 1994 to 1999. He was a member of the South Africa team that won the 1998 ICC KnockOut Trophy, and in the 1998 ICC KnockOut Trophy Final, he contributed 49 runs for the team before being run out.

== Domestic career ==
He played for several teams during his career, playing for Northerns and Easterns in South Africa, in addition to minor counties cricket for Buckinghamshire and Staffordshire. He was professional for Stockport CC in the Central Lancashire League in 1988.

== International career ==
He made his ODI debut with a Man of the Match Performance with an all round performance of 32 runs and 2/15 against New Zealand during the Mandela Trophy in 1994–95. His only century in ODIs was 106 against Pakistan at Wanderers Stadium, Johannesburg during the same tournament. He was run out 5 times in his first 7 ODIs. His best success came when South Africa won the 1998 ICC KnockOut Trophy, and in the final, he helped his team with a contribution of 49 runs.
