= Frans Cronje =

South African cricketer

- Born: Frans Johannes Cornelius Cronje; 15 May 1967 (age 59); Bloemfontein, South Africa
- Education: Grey College
- Occupations: Cricketer, film maker
- Years active: 1986–present
- Spouse: Rene
- Parents: Ewie Cronje (father); San-Marie Cronje (mother)
- Relatives: Hansie Cronje (brother)
- Cricket career

Cricket information
- Batting: Right-handed
- Bowling: Right-arm medium

Domestic team information
- Years: Team
- 1986–1992: Orange Free State
- 1992–1993: Griqualand West
- 1993–1996: Border
- FC debut: 21 November 1986 Orange Free State v Australian XI
- Last FC: 29 December 1996 Border v Transvaal
- LA debut: 26 October 1988 Orange Free State v Eastern Province
- Last LA: 20 December 1996 Border v Free State

Career statistics
Competition	First-class	List A
Matches	56	48
Runs scored	2503	925
Batting average	29.79	29.83
100s/50s	4/9	0/7
Top score	152*	93*
Balls bowled	4264	670
Wickets	67	20
Bowling average	31.82	26.70
5 wickets in innings	2	0
10 wickets in match	0	0
Best bowling	5/22	3/28
Catches/stumpings	28/–	14/–
- Source: CricketArchive (subscription required), 6 September 2019
- Website: www.franscronje.tv

Frans Johannes Cornelius Cronje is a South African former cricketer who played for Border, Griqualand West and Orange Free State during the 1980s and 1990s. He later became a film producer, director and writer, specialising in films with a Christian theme. He produced the 2008 film Hansie, based on the life of his brother, Hansie Cronje, the former South Africa national cricket team captain.

== Early life ==
Cronje was born in 1967 in Bloemfontein to Ewie and San-Marie (née Susanna Maria Strydom) Cronje. The Cronje family descended from Huguenot immigrants from Normandy in the late 1600s. His father had represented Orange Free State from 1961 to 1971 and later served as president of the Orange Free State Cricket Union. His younger brother, Hansie became an international cricketer, captaining South Africa between 1993 and 2000.

In 1985, Cronje represented South Africa at schoolboys level in both rugby union and cricket.

== Cricket career ==
Cronje played in domestic cricket in South Africa between 1986 and 1996.

His first-class debut came in November 1986 against the touring Australian team as part of the 1986–87 rebel tour of South Africa.

== Filmography ==
Film	Year	Credited as			Notes	Ref.
Film	Year	Director	Producer	Writer	Notes	Ref.
Faith like Potatoes	2006	No	Yes	No		
God's Farmer	2006	No	Yes	No		
Hansie: A True Story	2008	No	Yes	Yes		
Baroudeur	2012	Yes	Yes	Yes	Also actor. Known as Break Away in overseas release.	
Born to Win	2014	Yes	Yes	Yes	Also actor	
The Roar	2018	Yes	Yes	Yes	Also actor	
