= Ewie Cronje =

South African cricketer (1939–2020)

Ewie Cronjé
Personal information
- Full name: Nicolaas Everhardus Cronje
- Born: 23 July 1939; Bethulie, Orange Free State, South Africa
- Died: 11 May 2020 (aged 80); Bloemfontein, Free State, South Africa
- Relatives: Hansie Cronje (son); Frans Cronje (son)
- Source: Cricinfo, 4 May 2020

Nicolaas Everhardus "Ewie" Cronjé (23 July 1939 – 11 May 2020) was a South African cricketer who played in 27 first-class matches between 1960 and 1972. He was the father of Hansie Cronje and Frans Cronje. He was also the president of the Free State Cricket Union from 1983 to 1990, and in 2012 he was honoured with the Khaya Majola Lifetime Award, for his services to cricket.
