= Curtly Ambrose =

Antiguan cricketer (born 1963)

Sir Curtly Ambrose KCN
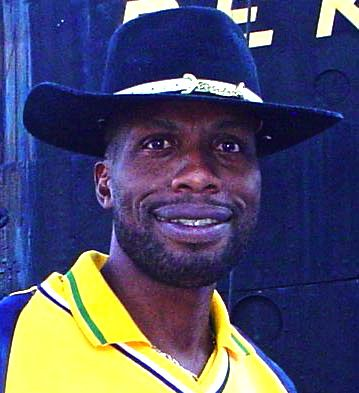

Personal information
- Full name: Curtly Elconn Lynwall Ambrose
- Born: 21 September 1963 (age 63); Swetes, Antigua and Barbuda
- Height: 201 cm (6 ft 7 in)
- Batting: Left-handed
- Bowling: Right-arm fast
- Role: Bowler

International information
- National side: West Indies (1988–2000)
- Test debut (cap 192): 2 April 1988 v Pakistan
- Last Test: 31 August 2000 v England
- ODI debut (cap 53): 12 March 1988 v Pakistan
- Last ODI: 23 April 2000 v Pakistan

Domestic team information
- Years: Team
- 1985–2000: Leeward Islands
- 1989–1996: Northamptonshire
- 1998–1999: Antigua and Barbuda

Career statistics
| Competition | Test | ODI | FC | LA |
|---|---|---|---|---|
| Matches | 98 | 176 | 239 | 329 |
| Runs scored | 1,439 | 639 | 3,448 | 1,282 |
| Batting average | 12.40 | 10.65 | 13.95 | 11.98 |
| 100s/50s | 0/1 | 0/0 | 0/4 | 0/0 |
| Top score | 53 | 31* | 78 | 48 |
| Balls bowled | 22,103 | 9,353 | 48,798 | 17,143 |
| Wickets | 405 | 225 | 941 | 401 |
| Bowling average | 20.99 | 24.12 | 20.24 | 23.83 |
| 5 wickets in innings | 22 | 4 | 50 | 4 |
| 10 wickets in match | 3 | 0 | 8 | 0 |
| Best bowling | 8/45 | 5/17 | 8/45 | 5/17 |
| Catches/stumpings | 18/0 | 45/0 | 88/0 | 82/0 |
- Source: Cricinfo, 24 October 2012

Sir Curtly Elconn Lynwall Ambrose KCN (born 21 September 1963) is an Antiguan former cricketer who played 98 Test matches for the West Indies. Widely acknowledged as one of the greatest fast bowlers of all time, he took 405 Test wickets at an average of 20.99 and topped the ICC Player Rankings for much of his career to be rated the best bowler in the world. His great height—he is 6 feet 7 inches (2.01 m) tall—allowed him to make the ball bounce unusually high after he delivered it; allied to his pace and accuracy, it made him a very difficult bowler for batsmen to face. A man of few words during his career, he was notoriously reluctant to speak to journalists. He was chosen as one of the Wisden Cricketers of the Year in 1992; after he retired he was entered into the International Cricket Council Hall of Fame and selected as one of West Indies all-time XI by a panel of experts.

Born in Swetes, Antigua, Ambrose came to cricket at a relatively late age, having preferred basketball in his youth, but quickly made an impression as a fast bowler. Progressing through regional and national teams, he was first chosen for the West Indies in 1988. He was almost immediately successful and remained in the team until his retirement in 2000. On many occasions, his bowling spells were responsible for winning matches for West Indies which seemed lost, in association with Courtney Walsh. Against Australia in 1993, he bowled one of the greatest bowling spells of all time, when he took seven wickets while conceding a single run, hence taking figures of 7/1 for the first spell of the match. Similarly, in 1994 he was largely responsible for bowling England out for 46 runs, taking six wickets for 24 runs. He is regarded as one of the greatest match-winning bowlers of all time.

Ambrose's bowling method relied on accuracy and conceding few runs; several of his best performances came when he took wickets in quick succession to devastate the opposition. He was particularly successful against leading batsmen. From 1995, Ambrose was increasingly affected by injury, and several times critics claimed that he was no longer effective. However, he continued to take wickets regularly up until his retirement, although he was sometimes less effective in the early matches of a series. In his final years, the West Indies team was in decline and often relied heavily on Ambrose and Walsh; both men often bowled with little support from the other bowlers. Following his retirement, Ambrose has pursued a career in music as the bass guitarist in a reggae band.

== Early life and career ==
Ambrose was born in Swetes, Antigua on 21 September 1963, the fourth of seven children. His father was a carpenter from a village. The family had no background in cricket, but his mother was a fan, and Ambrose played in his youth, primarily as a batsman. At school, he performed well academically, particularly in mathematics and French, and became an apprentice carpenter upon leaving at the age of 17. He briefly considered emigrating to America. At the time, his favourite sport was basketball, although he occasionally umpired cricket matches. Ambrose was not particularly tall until he reached his late teens, when he grew several inches to reach a height of 6 feet 7 inches (2.01 m). Around this time, his mother encouraged him to become more involved in cricket. Success as a fast bowler in a softball cricket match persuaded Ambrose to play in some club matches at the age of 20. He quickly attracted the attention of coaches and progressed to the St John's cricket team. Selected in the Leeward Islands competition, he took seven for 67 (seven wickets for 67 runs) for Antigua against St Kitts. He made his first-class debut for the Leeward Islands in 1985–86 and took four wickets in the game, but failed to retain his place the following year.

A Viv Richards scholarship provided funding for him to play club cricket in England for Chester Boughton Hall Cricket Club in the highly rated Liverpool Competition during 1986 where he took 84 wickets at an average of 9.80. The following year, he returned to England to play for Heywood Cricket Club in the Central Lancashire League, for whom he took 115 wickets in the season; these experiences helped to improve his bowling technique.

Upon his return to Antigua, Ambrose practised intensely, regained his place in the Leeward Islands team and, in the absence of leading bowlers Winston Benjamin and Eldine Baptiste with the West Indies team, became the main attacking bowler in the team. He was no-balled for throwing in the first match, which Wisden Cricketers' Almanack later attributed to confusion caused by his attribute of flicking his wrist prior to releasing the ball to impart extra pace, and there were no subsequent doubts about the legality of his bowling action. Retaining his place when the international bowlers returned, he took 35 wickets—including 12 in a match against Guyana, of which nine were bowled—in five matches in the competition. Wisden's report on the West Indian season said his performance was "dominant", although few had heard of him previously. Identifying his yorker as his most effective delivery, it noted that he "never lost his pace, his accuracy, or his thirst for wickets".

== International bowler ==
=== Debut and first years ===
When Pakistan toured the West Indies in 1988, Ambrose played in the One Day International (ODI) series, taking the place of the recently retired Joel Garner. He made his debut during the first match, on 12 March 1988 in Kingston, Jamaica, taking wickets with his third and ninth deliveries; he ended the innings with four for 39 from 10 overs. In the second match, he took four for 35 and followed with another two wickets in the third. West Indies won those first three matches to take the series, and Ambrose did not play in the fourth or fifth game. In the Test series which followed, Ambrose was less effective. In the first Test, he took two for 121 as West Indies lost at home for the first time in 10 years. Wisden noted that his debut was "unimpressive", but that he improved in the subsequent matches. He finished the series with seven wickets at an average of over 50 runs per wicket. Later that year, Ambrose was chosen to tour England. After appearing in early tour games, he was chosen for the first two ODIs, taking three wickets in total, but was omitted from the third. In the Test series, he played in all five matches to take 22 wickets at an average of 20.22; his best figures of four for 58 came in the fourth Test, in which he took seven wickets and was named man of the match. Writing in Wisden, commentator Tony Cozier described Ambrose as "a ready-made replacement for Garner"; the amount of bounce he generated after the ball pitched "made him a constant menace".

In 1988–89, West Indies took part in an ODI tournament in Sharjah. Ambrose took 8 wickets, and was man of the match with four for 29 when West Indies defeated Pakistan in the final. From there, West Indies travelled to Australia for a series in which Ambrose was a dominant figure. The West Indies won the Test series 3–1, using controversial short-pitched bowling tactics. Ambrose's height made him difficult to play as he made the ball bounce more than other bowlers. Writing in Wisden, John Woodcock noted: "As in England, earlier in 1988, Ambrose's bowling was a telling factor ... [His] advance compensated for something of a decline in [Malcolm] Marshall's effectiveness". In the first Test, he took seven wickets; in the second, he took five wickets in a Test innings for the first time with five for 72, and finished with eight in the game; and in the third, he took six wickets. His performances earned him man of the match award in the first and third games, and he ended the series with 26 wickets at an average of 21.46. He was West Indies' leading wicket-taker and headed the team bowling averages. In the ODI tournament that took place during the tour, West Indies defeated Australia in the final; Ambrose took 21 wickets in the series and twice took five wickets in an innings.

Suffering from fatigue and illness, Ambrose was less successful later in 1989 when India toured the West Indies: he took just five wickets in the four-Test series at an average of 54.60.

=== County cricketer and success against England ===
Ambrose made his debut in the English County Championship for Northamptonshire County Cricket Club in 1989—the club signed him for the 1988 season but as he was playing in the West Indies touring team, he was unavailable that year. He took a wicket with his first delivery for the club, but was not particularly successful in the first part of the season; he settled down later and took 28 first-class wickets at 28.39 for Northamptonshire in nine games.

Early in 1990, England toured the West Indies and played four Tests—a fifth was abandoned owing to rain. The visiting team dominated the first part of the series but West Indies eventually won 2–1. Ambrose was unfit for the first Test, which West Indies lost, and the first four ODIs, but returned to take four for 18 in an ODI organised to replace the rained-off second Test. After a drawn third Test, West Indies won the fourth game. The home captain, Viv Richards, set England 356 to win, but after losing early wickets, the English batsmen entered the last hour of the game with five wickets still to fall. Ambrose took the new ball and removed the last five batsmen for 18 runs in 46 deliveries, four of them leg before wicket. He finished with figures of eight for 45, ten wickets in the match, and West Indies levelled the series with a 164-run win. Ambrose was man of the match. He took six wickets in the final match, to finish the series with 20 wickets at 15.35, finishing top of the West Indies' averages. Ambrose, along with the other home bowlers, was described by Alan Lee in Wisden as an "awesome handful in the latter part of the series", and described his match-winning spell in the fourth Test as "unforgettable". Ambrose's other appearances for West Indies in 1989–90 were all in ODIs, although he did not take more than two wickets in any innings except in the match against England. He also took 22 first-class wickets for the Leeward Islands, and when he returned to England to play for Northamptonshire in 1990, took 58 first-class wickets to top the club's bowling averages. In one-day cricket for the county, he took 13 wickets while conceding an average of just 2.53 runs per over.

== Leading bowler in the world ==
=== Series against Australia and England ===
West Indies toured Pakistan in late 1990, and Ambrose topped the team's bowling averages in a three-match series which was drawn 1–1. He took 14 wickets at 17.07, but was overshadowed slightly by the performances of Ian Bishop. He played the first two ODIs, but missed the third after Pakistan had already won the series, and his best figures in the Tests came in the final match when he took five for 35. Then, when Australia toured West Indies from February 1991, Ambrose took 18 wickets in the five Tests at an average of 27.38. West Indies won the series 2–1, and Ambrose was fourth in the averages, but Tony Cozier observed in Wisden that the whole West Indies attack was dependable. Ambrose made an impression batting as part of a West Indian lower batting order which repeatedly added crucial runs during the series. He took part in two important partnerships to help his team recover from a difficult situation, and in the third match, he scored his only half-century in Tests. He also took 20 first-class wickets for Leeward Islands.

West Indies' next matches were in England. The Test series was drawn 2–2 and Ambrose was the team's leading wicket-taker with 28 (averaging 20.00); he also came top of the bowling averages. He had a particular impact on Graeme Hick, who was appearing in Test cricket for the first time, dismissing him six times in seven innings with short-pitched bowling. Accurate bowling was important in the series, played on a series of slow-paced pitches; according to Scyld Berry, writing in Wisden, "Since the 1988 tour, Ambrose had improved his control to the point where a batsman had to play almost every ball—and not with a scoring stroke, either". Berry suggests that West Indies may have won the series had Viv Richards used a different tactical approach with Ambrose's bowling. The bowler was not fully fit in the final Test, which may have affected the outcome. Berry describes "Ambrose's rise to the status of a giant—with the mannerism of celebrating each wicket by whirling his arms upwards, like a flock of doves taking to the air." Ambrose twice took five wickets in an innings—his best figures were six for 52 in the first Test, when he twice took wickets with consecutive deliveries. Ambrose was named man-of the-match in the third Test and adjudged West Indies man-of-the-series. For his performances, Ambrose was named one of Wisden's Cricketers of the Year. The citation remarked on his consistency and stated: "Ambrose has the ability to exert a debilitating psychological influence which so often precipitates a cluster of wickets after the initial breach has been made ... Moreover, he was arguably the essential difference between the two sides in what proved to be a zestful series." The West Indies wicket-keeper, Jeff Dujon, said: "He is mature beyond his years, has pace, accuracy, heart and determination, plus, importantly, real pride in economical figures."

=== Victory against South Africa ===
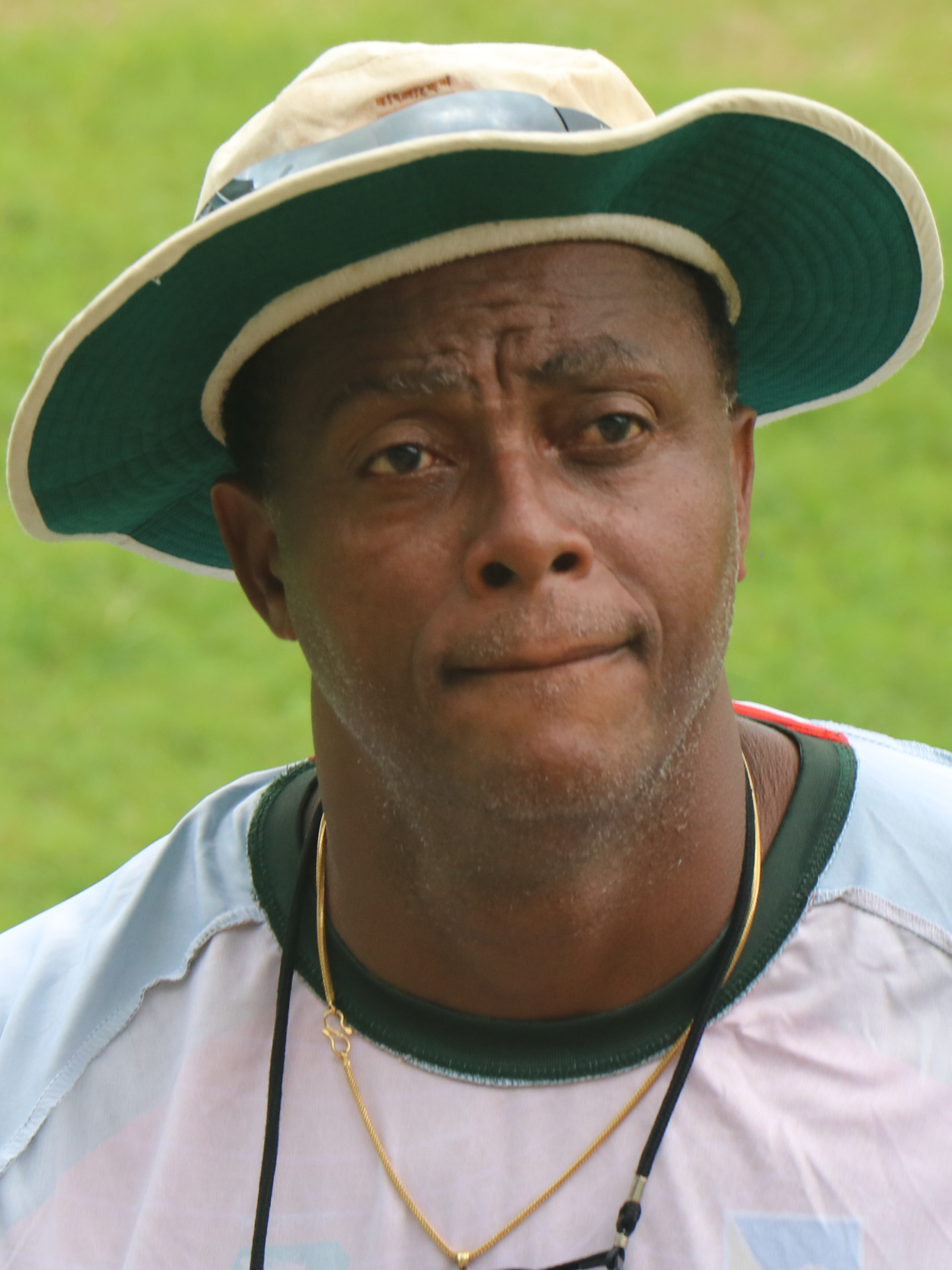
Courtney Walsh, Ambrose's bowling partner in many Test matches

During the 1991–92 season, West Indies played mainly one-day cricket, taking part in tournaments in Sharjah—where Ambrose took seven wickets, including an analysis of five for 53—and Australia, and took part in the World Cup in Australia and New Zealand. In this tournament, Ambrose took seven wickets in seven games at an average of 33.57 and was the seventh most economical bowler among those who played more than one game. West Indies finished sixth in the qualifying table and failed to reach the semi-finals. Ambrose returned home to play twice for the Leeward Islands in January 1992.

In April 1992, South Africa toured West Indies for the first time, and played their first Test match for 22 years. Ambrose played in all three ODIs, all of which were won by West Indies. The Test match was the first time West Indies bowled under a new playing regulation which permitted only one bouncer per over; this seemed to affect the home bowlers, but Ambrose took two for 47 from 36 overs. South Africa began the final day of the match requiring 79 runs to win with just two batsmen out, but Ambrose and Courtney Walsh took the last eight wickets for 26 runs to bowl West Indies to a 52-run win. On a difficult pitch for batting, the ball bounced unevenly, and both bowlers concentrated on accuracy. Ambrose took six for 34 in the second innings, and was named joint man of the match; in just over 60 overs, he took eight for 81 in the match.

Returning to play for Northamptonshire, he was less effective. Hampered by a knee injury, which necessitated surgery after the English season, and suffering from many dropped catches, he took 50 first-class wickets at an average of 26.14, but his performance compared unfavourably with other bowlers on the team. He was more effective in the NatWest Trophy, a one-day competition that Northamptonshire won that season, in which he conceded fewer than two runs per over across five games.

=== Second tour of Australia ===
The West Indies toured Australia in 1992–93, recovering from losing the second Test to win the final two matches and take the series 2–1. The team also won the annual World Series Cup. In the first three Tests, Ambrose was hampered by pitches which did not suit his bowling and, according to Tony Cozier writing in Wisden, was often unlucky when he bowled, although he took five for 66 in the first Test. In the final two Tests, he took 19 wickets. In the fourth he took ten wickets, including six for 74 in the first innings; in the second innings, he took three wickets in 19 deliveries and the West Indies won the match by one run. According to Cozier, the captains of both teams, Richie Richardson and Allan Border, "paid tribute to the man who made the result possible: Ambrose consolidated his reputation as the world's leading bowler". On the first day of the decisive final Test, Ambrose took seven wickets at the cost of one run from 32 deliveries and finished with figures of seven for 25. Cozier described it as "one of Test cricket's most devastating spells". West Indies won by an innings and Ambrose was named man of the series, having taken 33 wickets to equal the record in an Australia-West Indies Test series. He topped the West Indian bowling averages with an average of 16.42. Cozier described Ambrose's performance as "instrumental in winning [the series]" and his bowling as "flawless".

In the one-day tournament, Ambrose took 18 wickets at 13.38. He took eight wickets in the two-match final—both games were won by the West Indies. In the first final, he took five for 32, driven to bowl with more hostility when the Australian batsman Dean Jones asked him to remove his white wristbands while bowling. He followed up with three for 26 in the second match to be named player of the finals. After a one-day tournament in South Africa, West Indies returned home for Test and ODI series against Pakistan. The ODI series was drawn, but the West Indies defeated Pakistan 2–0 in the Tests. Ambrose took nine wickets at 23.11 to be fifth in the team bowling averages. The Wisden report suggested that he was suffering from fatigue after his team's busy schedule, but although not at his best, he continued to take important wickets. For Northamptonshire in 1993, Ambrose was second in the team first-class bowling averages with 59 wickets at 20.45.

Having developed a slower ball, and using the yorker more sparingly, Ambrose took five wickets in three games as West Indies won an ODI tournament in Sharjah in late October and November 1993. The team competed in another tournament, this time in India, later that November. They finished as runners-up, and Ambrose took four wickets in five matches. Immediately following this, West Indies toured Sri Lanka to play three ODIs and a Test, a rain-ruined match in which Ambrose took three wickets.

=== More success against England ===
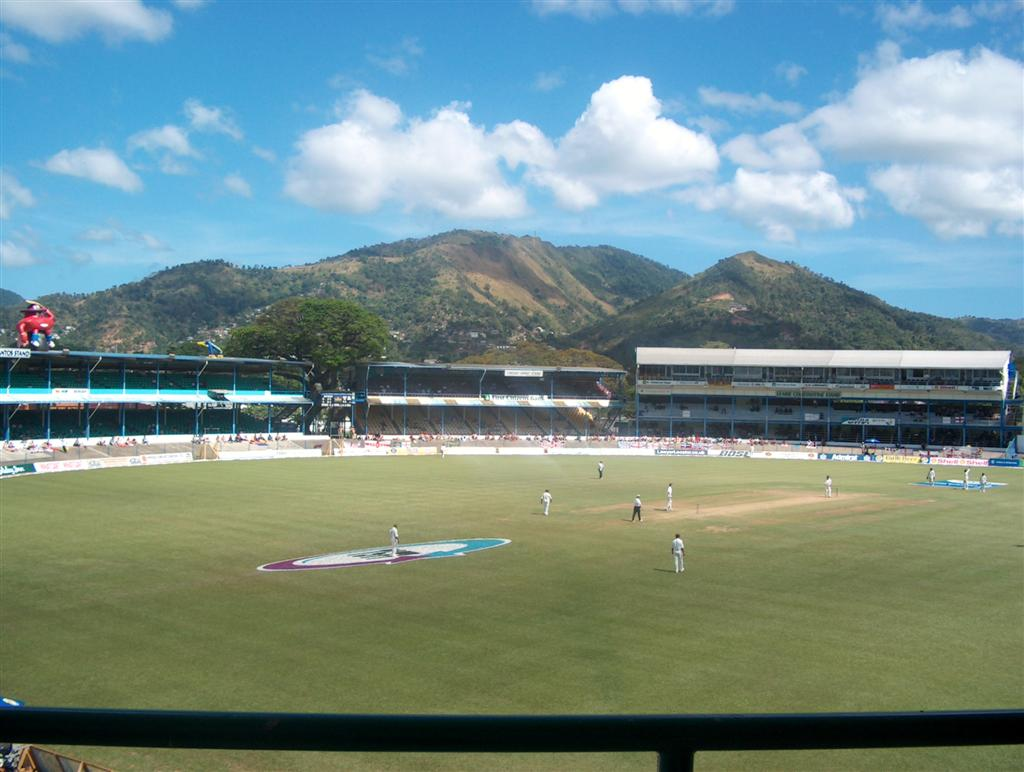
Ambrose took six for 24 to bowl England out for 46 at Queen's Park Oval, Trinidad.

When he returned to the West Indies, Ambrose took 19 first-class wickets for the Leeward Islands at an average of 11.68, in his first appearances for the islands in two years, but as England arrived to tour West Indies, he complained of fatigue and there were rumours he planned to retire. He played in three times in the five-match ODI series, taking two wickets, and took a further two wickets in the first Test, which West Indies won. In Wisden, Alan Lee described his performances at this time as "lethargic", and in the Guardian, Paul Allott wrote that he bowled "like a shadow" owing to the effects of continuous cricket. Ambrose was ineffective at the start of the second Test, but recovered, ending the match with eight wickets; according to Lee, he "struck the critical blows of the match" in the first innings. In the third Test, played in Trinidad, he took five for 60 in England's first innings, but after the visiting team built a substantial lead, West Indies were bowled out to leave England needing 194 to win and an hour to bat on the fourth evening. Ambrose took six wickets to leave England 40 for eight at the close of play; the next morning, they were bowled out for 46 and Ambrose had figures of six for 24 in the innings and match figures of 11 for 84; he was named man of the match. Lee described the collapse as "staggering", and judged Ambrose bowling to be "of the highest calibre". He continued: "He delivered one of the most devastating spells of even his career." Allott called it "the definitive spell of fast bowling".

Ambrose took four wickets in the fourth Test, but West Indies lost the match, their first defeat in Barbados for 59 years, and Ambrose was fined £1,000 by the match referee for knocking down his stumps in frustration when he was the last man out. He took one more wicket in the drawn final Test to finish the series with 26 wickets and top the West Indian bowling averages. Writing in Wisden, Lee summarised Ambrose's performances: "Ambrose was magnificent. He was deservedly named man of the series, not only for taking 26 wickets at an average of 19.96 apiece and winning the Trinidad Test single-handed, but for the more profound truth that West Indies now look to him whenever they need wickets ... [He] carried the attack alone".

Ambrose returned to play for Northamptonshire in 1994, but arrived later than scheduled. Claiming to need a rest, he missed his scheduled flight and arrived four days late. His absence may have contributed to Northamptonshire's elimination in the preliminary stages of the Benson and Hedges Cup. At the time, members of the county were unhappy with Ambrose's performances for the team; the committee fined him, and he expressed contrition. During the remainder of the season, he bowled extremely effectively to take 77 first-class wickets, the most for the club in 18 years, at an average of 14.45 to top the national bowling averages. According to Andrew Radd in Wisden, the club were mollified by his success, but he wrote: "Rarely in Northamptonshire's history have the performances and the personality of one cricketer dominated a season to the extent that Curtly Ambrose did in 1994." Ambrose missed the final match of the season with a shoulder problem.

== Apparent decline ==
=== Shoulder injury ===
Ambrose's shoulder injury, caused by his bowling workload, caused him to miss the West Indies' tour of India in the last three months of 1994. Although he returned to join the tour of New Zealand in early 1995, he did not reach his full bowling pace; he took one wicket in the ODI series and five in the two Test matches. He remained in the team when Australia toured the Caribbean later in 1995; the West Indies lost the Test series 2–1, their first defeat in a Test series since 1980. After taking two wickets in four ODIs, Ambrose took 13 wickets at 19.84 in the four-Test series to lead the West Indian averages. He took nine of these wickets in Trinidad during the third Test, when West Indies levelled the series having lost the first Test (the second was drawn). Bowling on a pitch that was extremely difficult for batting, and which both teams considered to be unsatisfactory, Ambrose took nine for 65 in the match and was named man of the match. During the game, Ambrose had to be pulled away from a verbal confrontation with Steve Waugh by the captain, Richardson. But outside of this match, the Australian team judged his bowling to have declined in pace following his shoulder injury, and that he lacked the variety to adapt to a different role. The West Indies' cricket manager, former Test bowler Andy Roberts, publicly claimed during the series that several of his team possessed "attitude problems", and complained that the fast bowlers would not follow his advice.

During the tour of England which followed, Ambrose did not take a wicket in the three-match ODI series; according to journalist Simon Barnes, both Ambrose and the team lacked confidence following their defeat by Australia; he lacked rhythm and displayed signs of frustration and unhappiness. He was more effective in the Test series, and according to Tony Cozier in Wisden, "was always captable of a spell of incisive, quality bowling". But he was affected by injury throughout the six-match series; he withdrew injured from the third Test having bowled fewer than eight overs and missed the fifth Test completely. Other bowlers in the team overshadowed Ambrose, and it was not until the final Test that he reached his most effective form in taking five for 96 in the first innings and seven wickets in the match. Waving to the crowd as he left the field on the final day with an injury, Ambrose seemed to indicate that he would not tour England again. He ended the series third in the bowling averages with 21 wickets at 24.09. But according to Cozier, the senior players in the team caused problems for the management, and when the players returned home, Ambrose and three other members of the team were fined 10 per cent of their tour fee—in Ambrose's case, the fine was for "general failings of behaviour and attitude", and setting a bad example to younger team-mates.

Along with other senior players, Ambrose was rested from West Indies' next tour, an ODI tournament in October 1995, but he returned to play in a three-team ODI tournament in Australia in December and January. However, affected by the refusal of Brian Lara to tour following after being fined for his behaviour during the tour of England, the team failed to qualify for the final. Ambrose took ten wickets in the tournament, and took three wickets in consecutive innings; in the latter game, he was man of the match. West Indies were more successful in the World Cup in India, Pakistan and Sri Lanka which began in February. They reached the semi-finals, losing to Australia. Ambrose was man of the match with three for 28 in his team's opening match, and took ten wickets at 17.00 in the competition. He conceded an average of just three runs per over for the tournament, the second best among those who played in more than two games. In March, Ambrose played in a home series against New Zealand. In the five match ODI series, 10 wickets at 17.60, including four for 36 in the opening game. He took eight wickets in the two-Test series at an average of 20.50, leading the team averages, and took five for 68 in the second match. During the English cricket season, he returned to Northamptonshire and took 43 wickets in nine games to lead the national bowling averages, but he missed several matches with recurring injuries and his contract was not renewed for the following year. He was replaced by the much younger Mohammad Akram as overseas player.

=== Team in decline ===
Following Australia's victory in 1994–95, when West Indies toured Australia in 1996–97 the series was heavily publicised as a re-match. However, the visiting team were often ineffective, continuing a trend of decline, and depended heavily on their senior players, one of whom was Ambrose. He began the series poorly, continuing a pattern established in several preceding series, and critics suggested that he was no longer effective. After taking only three wickets in the first two Tests, both of which were lost by West Indies, Ambrose told his team-mates that he would take ten wickets in the third. On a difficult pitch for batting, he managed to take nine in the match, including three in the first hour of the game, despite struggling with a hamstring injury. West Indies won, and Ambrose was named man of the match, but he missed the fourth Test with an injury. Writing in Wisden, Greg Baum suggested that Ambrose absence possibly affected the outcome of the series; Australia won easily to ensure they won the series. Ambrose returned for the final match, and on another difficult batting pitch, took five for 43 on the first day. West Indies won and Ambrose was again man of the match. He led the West Indies bowling averages with 19 wickets at 23.36, but had been the driving factor in West Indies' two wins. Ambrose also played in an ODI tournament during the tour of Australia, taking nine wickets at 27.33. Later in the season, between March and May 1997, India toured West Indies; Ambrose took ten wickets at 30.10 in the Test series, including five for 87 in the second Test, but was no longer the home team's most effective bowler. Then in June, Sri Lanka played a two-Test series, won 1–0 by West Indies. In the first, Ambrose took five for 37 in the first innings, and eight wickets in the game, to be named man of the match. This included his 300th wicket in Test matches; he was the 12th bowler, and fourth West Indian, to reach this landmark. Ambrose also played five ODIs during the West Indies home season, taking nine wickets.

West Indies' loss of form continued in late 1997 when they lost every international match during their tour of Pakistan. Ambrose played in two out of West Indies' three matches in an ODI tournament, taking one wicket, but his performance in taking one wicket in the two Test matches he played—he missed the third match with injury—prompted Fazeer Mohammed, writing in Wisden, to describe Ambrose as "a shadow of his former self". Any danger that Ambrose might have retired after this series was forestalled when Brian Lara was appointed West Indies captain and immediately spoke to Ambrose and Walsh to ask them to continue in the team. When England toured the West Indies between January and April 1998, he took 30 wickets at 14.26 to top the bowling averages for the series. (Note: The first Test was abandoned owing to dangerous playing conditions—the pitch was judged unfit for cricket.) Many of the pitches during the tour were poor for batting, but Ambrose was very effective, particularly in the second, third and fourth Tests. In addition, he dismissed Mike Atherton, the England captain, six times in the series. Scyld Berry wrote in Wisden that Ambrose was "back to something near his peak form ... [He] defied every prediction that he was finished after his tour of Pakistan." In the second Test, Ambrose took eight wickets; he conceded only 23 runs from 26 overs in the first innings and bowled a spell of five wickets for 16 runs from 47 deliveries in the second to complete figures of five for 52. Having won the second match, West Indies lost the third, but according to Matthew Engel, "Ambrose's abiding power was the most constant feature of a fluctuating match". His eight wickets in the game, including five for 25 in the first innings, took him past fifty Test wickets in Trinidad. He followed up with six wickets in West Indies victory in the fourth Test, taking four for 38 in the final innings. Tony Cozier wrote that Ambrose "thundered in, arms and knees pumping like pistons, to generate all of his old pace." Following the Test series, which West Indies won 3–1, Ambrose played in the first three matches of the ODI series, and took three wickets.

== Final years of career ==
Ambrose and Walsh missed the Mini World Cup ODI tournament in October 1998, in Ambrose's case following damage to his house caused by Hurricane Georges. They returned to the team for West Indies' first ever tour of South Africa, and Ambrose took 13 wickets in the series at an average of 23.76, but West Indies lost every game of the five-match series. In the first Test match, Ambrose and Walsh bowled effectively but lacked support from the other members of the attack. In the second Test, the pair again lacked support, but bowled well. The visiting team generally bowled too many bouncers to be effective, but Ambrose took eight wickets in the game, including six for 51 in the second innings. He was ineffective in the third Test, and despite bowling what Geoffrey Dean in Wisden called a "superb opening spell", could not prevent South Africa building up a large total against an attack lacking two other main bowlers. Ambrose pulled out of the attack himself later in the innings with a back injury, and did not bowl in the second innings. He missed the final Test with a hamstring injury. He was fit to play in the first six games of a seven-match ODI series, won 6–1 by South Africa, and took six wickets. In March 1999, West Indies then faced Australia in a home series, and contrary to expectations, West Indies drew the series 2–2. The outcome of the series was decided by a small group of players, including Ambrose, whom Mike Coward described in Wisden as "five of the most distinguished cricketers of all time". Ambrose took 19 wickets at 22.26, second to Walsh in the averages. His best figures came in the fourth and final Test, when he took five for 94 in the first innings and eight wickets in the match, but in the third match, although he only took four wickets in total, Coward described Ambrose as "rampant" and wrote that Steve Waugh, who scored 199, had to survive "some extraordinary pace bowling from Ambrose". He played four of the ODIs which followed in April, taking three wickets. The following month, Ambrose took part in the 1999 World Cup in England, and he was the second most economical bowler in the tournament in conceding an average 2.35 runs per over while taking seven wickets at 13.42. West Indies went out in the group stages, and Matthew Engel suggested that the bowlers were tired and judged the team "outright failures".

Following the World Cup, the West Indian selectors chose to rest Ambrose, along with Walsh, from alternate ODI tournaments. Ambrose consequently missed two ODI series, but in October 1999 he played two ODIs in a series against Bangladesh in Dhaka and three in a tournament in Sharjah. In the latter competition, Ambrose conceded five runs from ten overs against Sri Lanka, the second most economical bowling figures from a full allocation of 10 overs in all ODIs. However, in all five matches, he took just one wicket, and he injured his elbow in Sharjah which forced him to miss West Indies' tour of New Zealand which began in December. Ambrose recovered in time to play for the Leeward Island in domestic cricket, taking 31 wickets at 12.03 in seven first-class games. When Zimbabwe toured the West Indies, he returned to the West Indies team to be named man of the match in the first Test—Zimbabwe were bowled out for 63 when chasing 99 runs to win. He took a wicket in the second and final Test, and four wickets in six matches during a three-way ODI series also involving Zimbabwe and Pakistan. These were his final ODIs; in 176 matches, he took 225 wickets at an average of 24.12 and conceding 3.48 runs per over. Pakistan subsequently played a three-Test series against West Indies; in his last home series, Ambrose took 11 wickets at 19.90 to head the West Indian bowling averages.

Before his next series, a five-match series in England, Ambrose announced that he would retire after the final Test, although the president of the West Indies Cricket Board unavailingly tried to persuade him to continue for a little longer. West Indies lost the series 3–1, Tony Cozier, reviewing the series, suggested that only Ambrose and Walsh of the West Indian team emerged from the series with any credit. The other bowlers were ineffective, and Ambrose publicly commented during the series on the lack of support that he and Walsh received. He was second in the averages to Walsh with 17 wickets at 18.64. After taking just one wicket in the first Test, although Martin Johnson, in Wisden, suggested he bowled very well, Ambrose took five wickets in the second Test but was again unlucky as the batsmen were beaten by many deliveries that he bowled. After this match, Ambrose returned to the West Indies having been rested from an ODI tournament involving England and Zimbabwe. He took four wickets in the first innings of both the third and fourth Tests, passing 400 wickets in the latter match. After he took three wickets in his final Test match, the crowd gave him a standing ovation and the England players formed a guard-of-honour when he came out to bat. In 98 Test matches, he took 405 wickets at an average of 20.99; according to Mike Selvey, in Swetes, his mother rang a bell each time he took a Test wicket.

Having retired from cricket, Ambrose has concentrated on music, playing with several bands. He played bass guitar with the reggae band Big Bad Dread and the Baldhead; one fellow band member was his former team-mate Richie Richardson. Ambrose was appointed a Knight Commander of the Order of the Nation (KCN) by the Antiguan Barbudan government on 28 February 2014, alongside Richardson and Andy Roberts.

== Style and technique ==
Mike Selvey wrote in The Guardian in 1991 that Ambrose had "the sort of easy, repetitive, no-sweat action which is the key to unyielding accuracy. There is no respite and all his other qualities are byproducts." At his peak, Ambrose did not rely on pronounced swing or seam movement of the ball. Instead, he repeatedly bowled into the same areas of the pitch and the height from which he delivered the ball made him extremely difficult to face. The ball bounced sharply after pitching, sometimes deviating slightly from a straight line after pitching on the seam, and frequently took the edge of the batsman's bat to be caught behind the wicket. His 1992 citation as Wisden Cricketer of the Year states that he had "outright pace and he generates a disconcerting, steepling bounce from fuller-length deliveries ... His height and a slender, sinewy wrist contribute greatly to the final velocity [of the ball], the wrist snapping forward at the instant of release to impart extra thrust". Writing in 2001 following Ambrose's retirement, Michael Atherton, whom Ambrose dismissed more often than any other batsman, said: "At his best, there is no doubt that [Ambrose] moved beyond the fine line that separates the great from the very good. Quality bowlers essentially need two of three things: pace, movement and accuracy. Ambrose had all three."

Ambrose's height, and the accuracy with which he bowled, made it difficult for batsmen to play forward to the ball; instead they were forced to play with their weight going back. His accuracy meant that he was effective if the pitch favoured batsmen. He bowled an effective yorker, and unlike other fast bowlers, used short-pitched deliveries sparingly, although he could bowl a hostile bouncer, and concentrated on bowling a full-length aimed at the wickets. Ambrose rarely engaged in verbal sparring with batsmen, although in later years he occasionally inspected the pitch in an area close to the batsman before an innings began and rubbed his hands to suggest that he would enjoy bowling there. He always aimed to concede as few runs as possible when bowling, and frequently berated himself when he offered an easy delivery from which to score. Following his dismissal of a batsman, Ambrose often celebrated by pumping the air with his fists. With Courtney Walsh, Ambrose developed a reputation for performing at his best when his team seemed likely to lose, and he often took wickets in clusters which devastated the opposition. In addition, he was often most effective against the leading batsmen on a team; he was also capable of exploiting vulnerabilities in the techniques of other batsmen.

As of 2024, Ambrose's 405 Test wickets place him 17th on the list of leading Test wicket-takers. Of those who have taken over 200 Test wickets, Ambrose has the third best bowling average behind Malcolm Marshall and Joel Garner, and has the eighth best economy rate; he rises to third if only those who have taken over 250 wickets are included. For much of his career, Ambrose was rated the world's best bowler in the ICC player rankings, first reaching the top in 1991; he rarely dropped below second and was ranked in the top 10 from 1989 until the end of his career. His highest rating of 912 in the rankings, which he achieved in 1994, is the equal sixth best rating of all time. In 2010, Ambrose was chosen by a panel of writers and experts as a member of Cricinfo's "All-Time XI" for West Indies. The following year, he was inducted into the International Cricket Council Hall of Fame. During his playing days, Ambrose had a reputation for reticence, and rarely spoke to journalists or the opposition. His response to a request for an interview in 1991—"Curtly talks to no-one"— (Note: A journalist had asked Viv Richards about Ambrose, who was walking past. Interrupting the conversation, Ambrose said "If you want to know about Curtly, you ask Curtly". When the journalist complied, Ambrose responded "Curtly talks to no-one".) became associated with him throughout his career, but he was more willing to talk to journalists after he retired.

== Coaching career ==
In January 2022, Ambrose was appointed as bowling coach of Jamaica Tallawahs for CPL 2022 edition.

== See also ==
- List of international cricket five-wicket hauls by Curtly Ambrose

== Bibliography ==
- Ahmed, Qamar (1989). "The Pakistanis in the West Indies, 1987–88". In Wright, Graeme (ed.). Wisden Cricketers' Almanack. London: John Wisden & Co. ISBN 0-947766-13-8.
- Ahmed, Qamar (1992). "The West Indians in Pakistan, 1990–91". In Wright, Graeme (ed.). Wisden Cricketers' Almanack. London: John Wisden & Co. ISBN 0-947766-18-9.
- Atherton, Mike (2001). "Brothers in Arms: Curtly Ambrose". In Wright, Graeme (ed.). Wisden Cricketers' Almanack. London: John Wisden & Co. ISBN 0-947766-63-4.
- Baum, Greg (1998). "The West Indians in Australia, 1996–97". In Engel, Matthew (ed.). Wisden Cricketers' Almanack. London: John Wisden & Co. ISBN 0-947766-44-8.
- Berry, Scyld (1992). "The West Indians in England, 1991". In Wright, Graeme (ed.). Wisden Cricketers' Almanack. London: John Wisden & Co. ISBN 0-947766-18-9.
- Berry, Scyld (1999). "England in the West Indies, 1997–98". In Engel, Matthew (ed.). Wisden Cricketers' Almanack. London: John Wisden & Co. ISBN 0-947766-50-2.
- Coward, Mike (2000). "The Australians in the West Indies, 1998–99". In Engel, Matthew (ed.). Wisden Cricketers' Almanack. London: John Wisden & Co. ISBN 0-947766-57-X.
- Cozier, Tony (1989). "The West Indians in England, 1988". In Wright, Graeme (ed.). Wisden Cricketers' Almanack. London: John Wisden & Co. ISBN 0-947766-13-8.
- Cozier, Tony (1992). "The Australians in the West Indies, 1990–91". In Wright, Graeme (ed.). Wisden Cricketers' Almanack. London: John Wisden & Co. ISBN 0-947766-18-9.
- Cozier, Tony (1992). "The West Indians in Australia, 1992–93". In Wright, Graeme (ed.). Wisden Cricketers' Almanack. London: John Wisden & Co. ISBN 0-947766-22-7.
- Cozier, Tony (1996). "The West Indians in England, 1995". In Engel, Matthew (ed.). Wisden Cricketers' Almanack. London: John Wisden & Co. ISBN 0-947766-31-6.
- Cozier, Tony (1998). "The Indians in the West Indies, 1996–97". In Engel, Matthew (ed.). Wisden Cricketers' Almanack. London: John Wisden & Co. ISBN 0-947766-44-8.
- Cozier, Tony (2001). "The West Indians in England, 2000". In Wright, Graeme (ed.). Wisden Cricketers' Almanack. London: John Wisden & Co. ISBN 0-947766-63-4.
- Cozier, Tony (2000). "Cricket in the West Indies, 1998–99". In Engel, Matthew (ed.). Wisden Cricketers' Almanack. London: John Wisden & Co. ISBN 0-947766-57-X.
- Craddock, Robert (1996). "The Australians in the West Indies, 1994–95". In Engel, Matthew (ed.). Wisden Cricketers' Almanack. London: John Wisden & Co. ISBN 0-947766-31-6.
- Dean, Geoffrey (1993). "The South Africans in the West Indies, 1991–92". In Engel, Matthew (ed.). Wisden Cricketers' Almanack. London: John Wisden & Co. ISBN 0-947766-20-0.
- Dean, Geoffrey (2000). "The West Indians in South Africa, 1998–99". In Engel, Matthew (ed.). Wisden Cricketers' Almanack. London: John Wisden & Co. ISBN 0-947766-57-X.
- Lawrence, Bridgette; Goble, Ray (1991). The Complete Record of West Indian Test Cricketers. Leicester: ACL and Polar Publishing (UK) Ltd. ISBN 0-9514862-2-5.
- Lee, Alan (1991). "England in the West Indies, 1989–90". In Wright, Graeme (ed.). Wisden Cricketers' Almanack. London: John Wisden & Co. ISBN 0-947766-16-2.
- Lee, Alan (1995). "England in the West Indies, 1993–94". In Engel, Matthew (ed.). Wisden Cricketers' Almanack. London: John Wisden & Co. ISBN 0-947766-24-3.
- Lee, Alan (1997). "The World Cup, 1996". In Engel, Matthew (ed.). Wisden Cricketers' Almanack. London: John Wisden & Co. ISBN 0-947766-38-3.
- Mohammed, Fazeer (1999). "The West Indians in Pakistan, 1997–98". In Engel, Matthew (ed.). Wisden Cricketers' Almanack. London: John Wisden & Co. ISBN 0-947766-50-2.
- Woodcock, John (1990). "The West Indians in Australia, 1988–89". In Wright, Graeme (ed.). Wisden Cricketers' Almanack. London: John Wisden & Co. ISBN 0-947766-15-4.
