= Norman Crookes =

South African cricketer

Personal information
- Full name: Norman Samuel Crookes
- Born: 15 November 1935 (age 90); Renishaw, Natal, South Africa
- Batting: Right-handed
- Bowling: Right-arm off-spin
- Relatives: Derek Crookes (son); Dennis Crookes (cousin)

Domestic team information
- Years: Team
- 1962/63–1969/70: Natal

Career statistics
Competition	First-class
Matches	50
Runs scored	1,123
Batting average	19.03
100s/50s	0/5
Top score	68
Balls bowled	10,349
Wickets	153
Bowling average	29.33
5 wickets in innings	6
10 wickets in match	1
Best bowling	8/47
Catches/stumpings	51/–
- Source: Cricinfo, 22 March 2018

Norman Samuel Crookes (born 15 November 1935) is a former cricketer who played first-class cricket in South Africa from 1962 to 1970.

== Career ==
Norman Crookes was an off-spinner and useful lower-order batsman for Natal. On his first-class debut, in the Currie Cup in 1962–63, he took 5 for 62 and 2 for 48 in Natal's victory over Western Province. He was a steady performer over the next three seasons. His most significant performance was for a South African Colts XI against the touring MCC early in the 1964–65 season, when in difficult circumstances caused by illness to several of the team he scored 60 and 25 and took 2 for 66 and 5 for 102 and almost brought off a surprise victory.

He was selected as one of the three spin bowlers for the tour of England in 1965. Despite taking more wickets in the matches outside the Tests than any other bowler, he did not play in the three Tests. He took 2 for 94 and 8 for 47 in the victory over Middlesex and 5 for 54 and 3 for 47 in the victory over Lancashire, and finished the tour with 47 wickets in 10 matches at an average of 19.44.

Crookes continued to play for Natal until the end of the 1969–70 season. His son Derek Crookes played 32 one-day matches for South Africa between 1994 and 2000.
