= Steve Elworthy =

South African cricketer

Steve Elworthy MBE
Personal information
- Born: 23 February 1965 (age 61); Bulawayo, Rhodesia
- Batting: Right-handed
- Bowling: Right-arm fast-medium
- Role: Bowler

Domestic team information
- Years: Team
- 1988–1997: Northern Transvaal
- 1996: Lancashire
- 1997–2003: Northerns
- 2003: Nottinghamshire

Career statistics
Competition	Test	ODI
Matches	4	39
Runs scored	72	100
Batting average	18.00	12.50
100s/50s	0/0	0/0
Top score	48	23
Balls bowled	867	1,702
Wickets	13	44
Bowling average	34.15	28.06
5 wickets in innings	0	0
10 wickets in match	0	0
Best bowling	4/66	3/17
Catches/stumpings	1/–	9/–
Medal record
Representing South Africa
Men's Cricket
Commonwealth Games
Gold medal – first place	1998 Kuala Lumpur	List-A cricket
- Source: Cricinfo, 25 January 2006

Steven Elworthy, MBE (born 23 February 1965) is a former South African international cricketer who has worked in administration with Cricket South Africa and the England and Wales Cricket Board since retiring from playing the game. Elworthy was a member of the South Africa team that won the 1998 ICC KnockOut Trophy, which was the nation's first major world title in cricket.

== International career ==
Elworthy grew up in Zimbabwe, attending Chaplin High School, before moving to South Africa when he was 18. After 10 years of playing first class cricket Elworthy made his One Day International (ODI) debut at age 32 for South Africa on April 3, 1998, against Pakistan. His Test debut was later that year, July 23 against England at Trent Bridge, Nottingham.

He went on to play a total of four Test matches and 39 ODIs for South Africa between 1998 and 2002.

== Domestic career ==
In South Africa he played for Northerns over a 14-season career. In 2000–01 he was the leading wicket taker in South African first class cricket with 52 at 18.11. He was named one of five South African Cricket Annual Cricketers of the Year in 2002. He departed amicably from the Northerns squad in 2003, effectively marking his retirement as a professional player.

Elworthy also played English county cricket. In 1996 he spent a season at Lancashire. This was a difficult year with modest on-field success (26 wickets at 41), capped by being dropped on the morning of the B&H Cup Final. In 2003 he filled in for six weeks at Nottinghamshire County Cricket Club while the club's full-time overseas players Stuart MacGill and Chris Cairns fulfilled international obligations.

He played for English club side Hinckley Town and also was a professional player for many years for English club teams Rishton and Flowery Field.

== Cricket Administration ==
Since his retirement Elworthy has become a successful cricket administrator as Cricket South Africa's commercial and communications manager. He was appointed as tournament director for the inaugural Twenty20 World Championship in South Africa in 2007. In February 2010 Elworthy was appointed as Director of Marketing and Communications for the England and Wales Cricket Board. He was appointed Chief Executive Officer of Surrey CCC on 23 September 2021.
