= 1998 KnockOut Trophy =

Cricket tournament held in Bangladesh

1998 ICC KnockOut Trophy
- Dates: 24 October – 1 November
- Administrator: International Cricket Council
- Cricket format: One Day International
- Tournament format: Knockout
- Host: Bangladesh
- Champions: South Africa (1st title)
- Runners-up: West Indies
- Participants: 9
- Matches: 8
- Player of the series: (South Africa) Jacques Kallis
- Most runs: (Cricket West Indies) Philo Wallace (221)
- Most wickets: (South Africa) Jacques Kallis (8)
- Official website: ICC-Cricinfo Tournament website

The 1998 Wills International Cup was a One Day International cricket tournament held in Bangladesh. New Zealand defeated Zimbabwe in a pre-quarter-final match to qualify for the main knockout stage. Future editions of this tournament are now known as the ICC Champions Trophy. Appearing in their first major tournament final, South Africa defeated the West Indies in the final to win the event. This tournament was inaugurated on the basis of FIFA Confederations Cup where the best teams from their respected confederations compete against each other but in this case the top teams in the ICC ODI Championship compete with each other.

== History ==
The ICC conceived the idea of a short cricket tournament to raise funds for the development of the game in non-test playing countries. The tournament, later dubbed as the mini-World Cup as it involved all of the full members of the ICC, was planned as a knock-out tournament so that it was short and did not reduce the value and importance of the World Cup.

== Venue ==
The ICC decided to award the tournament to Bangladesh to promote the game in that nation. Bangladesh did not participate as they were not a test playing nation at that time although they had won the 1997 ICC Trophy and qualified for the 1999 Cricket World Cup. One of the worst ever floods of the region threatened to ruin the tournament. However, the tournament eventually went ahead and the Bangladesh Cricket Board promised to donate 10% of the gate money to the Prime Minister's Fund for flood relief.

== Fixtures ==
The tournament was held in a direct knock-out format and involved all of the Test playing countries of the time. There were 9 countries eligible which meant that 2 countries would play a qualifier knockout to determine the final 8 teams. Initially, it was announced that the 9 teams would be ranked according to the 1996 Cricket World Cup seedings. However, the draw that was eventually released appeared to have been tweaked in favour of some of the teams with larger followings and saw New Zealand play Zimbabwe in order to qualify for the main draw.

== Squads ==
All nine Test cricket nations participated in the tournament. The teams could name a preliminary squad of 30, but only 14-man squads were permitted for the actual tournament, one month before the start of the tournament.

== Results ==
Preliminary match
24 October – Dhaka
Zimbabwe	258/7
New Zealand	260/5

Quarter-finals
25 October – Dhaka
South Africa	283/4
England	281/7
26 October – Dhaka
New Zealand	188/10
Sri Lanka	191/5
28 October – Dhaka, Dhaka
India	307/8
Australia	263/10
29 October – Dhaka
West Indies	289/9
Pakistan	259/9

Semi-finals
30 October – Dhaka
South Africa	240/7
Sri Lanka	132/10
31 October – Dhaka
India	242/6
West Indies	245/4

Final
1 November – Dhaka
South Africa	248/6
West Indies	245/10

=== Preliminary match ===
24 October 1998 (D/N)
Scorecard

Zimbabwe; 258/7 (50 overs)	v	New Zealand; 260/5 (50 overs)
Alistair Campbell 100 (143); Geoff Allott 3/54 (8 overs)		Stephen Fleming 96 (130); Andy Whittall 1/35 (8 overs)

New Zealand won by 5 wickets
Bangabandhu National Stadium, Dhaka, Bangladesh
Umpires: Steve Bucknor (WI) and Peter Willey (Eng)
Player of the match: Stephen Fleming (NZ)

- New Zealand qualified for the main tournament as a result of winning this preliminary match

=== Quarter-finals ===
25 October 1998
Scorecard

England; 281/7 (50 overs)	v	South Africa; 283/4 (46.4 overs)
Adam Hollioake 83 (91); Jacques Kallis 3/48 (10 overs)		Daryll Cullinan 69 (70); Graeme Hick 1/28 (7 overs)

South Africa won by 6 wickets
Bangabandhu National Stadium, Dhaka, Bangladesh
Umpires: Steve Dunne (NZ) and Srinivasaraghavan Venkataraghavan (Ind)
Player of the match: Daryll Cullinan (SA)

26 October 1998
Scorecard

New Zealand; 188 (49.5 overs)	v	Sri Lanka; 191/5 (41.3 overs)
Adam Parore 54 (87); Muttiah Muralitharan 3/31 (10 overs)		Arjuna Ranatunga 90* (116); Simon Doull 2/17 (5 overs)

Sri Lanka won by 5 wickets
Bangabandhu National Stadium, Dhaka, Bangladesh
Umpires: David Shepherd (Eng) and Peter Willey (Eng)
Player of the match: Arjuna Ranatunga (SL)

28 October 1998
Scorecard

India; 307/8 (50 overs)	v	Australia; 263 (48.1 overs)
Sachin Tendulkar 141 (128); Michael Kasprowicz 3/71 (9 overs)		Mark Waugh 74 (79); Sachin Tendulkar 4/38 (9.1 overs)

India won by 44 runs
Bangabandhu National Stadium, Dhaka, Bangladesh
Umpires: Steve Bucknor (WI) and Steve Dunne (NZ)
Player of the match: Sachin Tendulkar (Ind)

29 October 1998
Scorecard

West Indies; 289/9 (50 overs)	v	Pakistan; 259/9 (50 overs)
Philo Wallace 79 (58); Wasim Akram 3/55 (10 overs)		Ijaz Ahmed 51 (64); Keith Arthurton 4/31 (10 overs)

West Indies won by 30 runs
Bangabandhu National Stadium, Dhaka, Bangladesh
Umpires: Dave Orchard (SA) and David Shepherd (Eng)
Player of the match: Keith Arthurton (WI)

=== Semi-finals ===
The first semi-final was played between South Africa and Sri Lanka on 30 October 1998 in Dhaka. On the rainy day, the match was initially reduced to 39 overs per innings. South Africa batted first and scored 240 runs for 7 wickets. Jacques Kallis scored 113 not out runs from 100 balls. The second innings was further reduced by 5 overs and the revising target was 224 runs in 34 overs. Sri Lanka scored 132 all out in 23.1 overs. Sanath Jayasuriya was Sri Lanka's highest run-scorer with 22 runs. South Africa won the match by 92 runs applying the Duckworth–Lewis method. Kallis was awarded the man of the match for his performance.

West Indies played India in the second semi-final of the tournament on 31 October 1998 in Dhaka. India won the toss and decided to bat first. They scored 242 runs for 6 wickets in 50 overs, including Sourav Ganguly's 83 runs from 116 balls. Dillon finished with 3 wickets for 38 runs in 8 overs. West Indies started their innings aggressively, reaching 100 runs in 15 overs. They achieved the target in 47 overs losing 4 wickets. Shivnarine Chanderpaul scored 74 runs in the West Indian innings. Dillon was named the man of the match.

30 October 1998
Scorecard

South Africa; 240/7 (39 overs)	v	Sri Lanka; 132 (23.4 overs)
Jacques Kallis 113* (100); Nuwan Zoysa 2/34 (6 overs)		Sanath Jayasuriya 22 (17); Steve Elworthy 3/21 (4 overs)

South Africa won by 92 runs (D/L method)
Bangabandhu National Stadium, Dhaka, Bangladesh
Umpires: Steve Bucknor (WI) and Srinivasaraghavan Venkataraghavan (Ind)
Player of the match: Jacques Kallis (SA)

- The start of the match was delayed by rain and it was reduced to 39 overs a side.
- Further rain during the innings interval resulted in the revised D/L target of 224 in 34 overs.

31 October 1998
Scorecard

India; 242/6 (50 overs)	v	West Indies; 245/4 (47 overs)
Saurav Ganguly 83 (116); Mervyn Dillon 3/38 (8 overs)		Shivnarine Chanderpaul 74 (74); Sachin Tendulkar 2/29 (10 overs)

West Indies won by 6 wickets
Bangabandhu National Stadium, Dhaka, Bangladesh
Umpires: Dave Orchard (SA) and David Shepherd (Eng)
Player of the match: Mervyn Dillon (WI)

=== Final ===
The final of the inaugural edition was played between South Africa and West Indies on 1 November 1998 at Bangabandhu National Stadium, Dhaka. After losing the toss, West Indies were invited to bat, and scored 245 runs in 49.3 overs. Kallis took 5 wickets conceding 30 runs in 7.3 overs. South Africa achieved the target in 47 overs losing 6 wickets, with Hansie Cronje and Mike Rindel scoring 61 not out and 49 runs respectively. Kallis scored 37 runs, and was named the man of the match for his performance. He also received the man of the tournament award. With this victory, South Africa won the inaugural edition of the ICC KnockOut Trophy.

1 November 1998
Scorecard

West Indies; 245 (49.3 overs)	v	South Africa; 248/6 (47 overs)
Philo Wallace 103 (102); Jacques Kallis 5/30 (7.3 overs)		Hansie Cronje 61* (77); Phil Simmons 2/45 (8 overs)

South Africa won by 4 wickets
Bangabandhu National Stadium, Dhaka
Umpires: Steve Dunne (NZ) and Peter Willey (Eng)
Player of the match: Jacques Kallis (SA)

- South Africa won the toss and elected to field.
- This was the only senior ICC event won by South Africa until 2025.

== Statistics ==
=== Team totals ===
==== Highest team totals ====
Highest team total (250 plus)
Score (Overs)	Country	Opponent	Venue	Date
307/8 (50.0)	India	Australia	Bangabandhu National Stadium	28 October 1998
289/9 (50.0)	West Indies	Pakistan	Bangabandhu National Stadium	29 October 1998
283/4 (46.4)	South Africa	England	Bangabandhu National Stadium	25 October 1998
281/7 (50.0)	England	South Africa	Bangabandhu National Stadium	25 October 1998
263/10 (48.1)	Australia	India	Bangabandhu National Stadium	28 October 1998
260/5 (50.0)	New Zealand	Zimbabwe	Bangabandhu National Stadium	24 October 1998
259/9 (50.0)	Pakistan	West Indies	Bangabandhu National Stadium	29 October 1998
258/7 (50.0)	Zimbabwe	New Zealand	Bangabandhu National Stadium	24 October 1998

=== Batting ===
==== Most runs in the tournament ====
Most runs in the tournament (Top 5 players)
Player	Country	M	I	NO	Total	HS	Avg	S/R	100s	50s
Philo Wallace	West Indies	3	3	0	221	103	73.66	107.80	1	1
Jacques Kallis	South Africa	3	3	1	164	113*	82.00	95.34	1	0
Shivnarine Chanderpaul	West Indies	3	3	0	150	74	50.00	75.37	0	1
Sachin Tendulkar	India	2	2	0	149	141	74.50	104.92	1	0
Hansie Cronje	South Africa	3	3	1	148	67	74.00	90.79	0	2
Source: Cricinfo

==== Highest average in the tournament ====
Highest average in the tournament (Top 5 players, minimum 50 runs)
Player	Country	M	I	NO	Total	HS	Avg	S/R	100s	50s
Alistair Campbell	Zimbabwe	1	1	0	100	100	100.00	69.93	1	0
Arjuna Ranatunga	Sri Lanka	2	2	1	94	90*	94.00	75.80	0	1
Jacques Kallis	South Africa	3	3	1	164	113*	82.00	95.34	1	0
Andy Flower	Zimbabwe	1	1	0	77	77	77.00	96.25	0	1
Robin Singh	India	2	2	1	76	73*	76.00	116.92	0	1
Source: Cricinfo

==== Highest individual scores ====
Highest individual scores (Top 5 players)
Player	Country	Runs	Balls	S/R	4s	6s	Opponent	Venue	Date
Sachin Tendulkar	India	141	128	110.15	13	3	Australia	Bangabandhu National Stadium	28 October 1998
Jacques Kallis	South Africa	113*	100	113.00	5	5	Sri Lanka	Bangabandhu National Stadium	30 October 1998
Philo Wallace	West Indies	103	102	100.98	11	5	South Africa	Bangabandhu National Stadium	1 November 1998
Alistair Campbell	Zimbabwe	100	143	69.93	7	1	New Zealand	Bangabandhu National Stadium	24 October 1998
Stephen Fleming	New Zealand	96	130	73.84	3	1	Zimbabwe	Bangabandhu National Stadium	24 October 1998
Source: Cricinfo

==== Highest partnerships ====
Highest partnerships (Top 10)
Runs	Balls	RR	Wicket	Players	Country	Opponent	Venue	Date
140	140	6.00	3rd	Rahul Dravid & Sachin Tendulkar	India	Australia	Bangabandhu National Stadium	28 October 1998
132	114	6.94	4th	Ajay Jadeja & Sachin Tendulkar	India	Australia	Bangabandhu National Stadium	28 October 1998
127	155	4.91	4th	Romesh Kaluwitharana & Arjuna Ranatunga	Sri Lanka	New Zealand	Bangabandhu National Stadium	26 October 1998
125	147	5.10	4th	Stephen Fleming & Adam Parore	New Zealand	Zimbabwe	Bangabandhu National Stadium	24 October 1998
118	165	4.29	4th	Alistair Campbell & Andy Flower	Zimbabwe	New Zealand	Bangabandhu National Stadium	24 October 1998
117	97	7.23	4th	Hansie Cronje & Jonty Rhodes	South Africa	England	Bangabandhu National Stadium	25 October 1998
113	116	5.84	1st	Daryll Cullinan & Michael Rindel	South Africa	England	Bangabandhu National Stadium	25 October 1998
112	144	4.66	6th	Neil Fairbrother & Adam Hollioake	England	South Africa	Bangabandhu National Stadium	25 October 1998
109	87	7.51	2nd	Shivnarine Chanderpaul & Philo Wallace	West Indies	Pakistan	Bangabandhu National Stadium	29 October 1998
94	101	5.58	2nd	Ricky Ponting & Mark Waugh	Australia	India	Bangabandhu National Stadium	28 October 1998
Source: Cricinfo
