= Philo Wallace =

Barbadian cricketer (born 1970)

Cricket information
- Batting: Right-handed
- Bowling: Right-arm medium

Career statistics
Competition	Test	ODI
Matches	7	33
Runs scored	279	701
Batting average	21.46	21.24
100s/50s	0/2	1/2
Top score	92	103
Catches/stumpings	9/–	11/–
- Source: Cricinfo, 25 January 2006

Philo Alphonso Wallace (born 2 August 1970) is a Barbadian cricketer who played for the West Indies.

Having first attempted to get into cricket in 1990, he made the big time in 1997–98 after hitting 198 runs in two Test matches. He formed an opening partnership with Guyanese batsman Clayton Lambert that for a brief period was hailed as a possible successor to the legendary Greenidge/Haynes partnership that dominated the 1980s. It was not to be, though, and by the end of the West Indies' ill-fated tour to South Africa in late 1998, both Wallace and Lambert had been discarded from future selection. Unusually, Wallace was able to take a catch in all 7 of the Test matches that he played in.

At one point in his career he played as captain, but he was omitted from the squad in the 2003–04 season.

Philo Wallace was the first player to score an ODI century in the finals of the ICC Knockout Trophy history when he scored his only ODI hundred in the inaugural ICC Knockout Trophy final against South Africa in 1998. West Indies managed to post only 245 runs and lost the finals to South Africa in a thriller.
