= 2007 Cricket World Cup officials =

The umpiring panel for the 2007 Cricket World Cup comprised nine umpires from the Elite Panel of ICC Umpires (the only member not included was Darrell Hair), and nine umpires from the international panel. The refereeing panel comprises seven members from the Elite Panel of ICC Referees, with Clive Lloyd not being included due to his role as West Indies' team manager. Aleem Dar went on to stand as an umpire in his first World Cup final, alongside Steve Bucknor who was appearing in his fifth final in a row - extending his record of four from the 2003 World Cup.

== Umpires ==
Panel	Umpire	Country	Matches
Elite
Elite	Mark Benson	England	8
Elite	Billy Bowden	New Zealand	9
Elite	Steve Bucknor	West Indies	10
Elite	Aleem Dar	Pakistan	10
Elite	Billy Doctrove	West Indies	8
Elite	Daryl Harper	Australia	8
Elite	Rudi Koertzen	South Africa	10
Elite	Asad Rauf	Pakistan	8
Elite	Simon Taufel	Australia	10
International
International	Steve Davis	Australia	3
International	Ian Gould	England	3
International	Goland Greaves	West Indies	0^{*}
International	Tony Hill	New Zealand	3
International	Ian Howell	South Africa	3
International	Brian Jerling	South Africa	3
International	Norman Malcolm	West Indies	0^{*}
International	Peter Parker	Australia	3
International	Asoka de Silva	Sri Lanka	3

From the International Panel, Russell Tiffin of Zimbabwe, Nigel Llong of England and Suresh Shastri of India were identified as the reserve umpires, should a member of the above panel have become unavailable. None were eventually called on by the end of the tournament.

^{*} Norman Malcolm and Goland Greaves only officiated in one match each, both acting as Fourth umpire.

== Referees ==
Referee	Country
Chris Broad	England
Jeff Crowe	New Zealand
Alan Hurst	Australia
Ranjan Madugalle	Sri Lanka
Roshan Mahanama	Sri Lanka
Mike Procter	South Africa
Javagal Srinath	India

Seven of the eight members of the Panel of ICC Referees were included in the roster to perform match refereeing duties throughout the tournament. The only member to be left out was Clive Lloyd due to his commitment as coach of the West Indies cricket team; however he announced his retirement from match refereeing towards the end of the Super 8 stage of the competition.

== Match appointments ==
=== Group stage appointments ===
Date	Team 1	Team 2	Umpire	Umpire	3rd umpire	4th umpire	Referee
13 March	West Indies	Pakistan	Billy Bowden	Simon Taufel	Brian Jerling	Ian Gould	Chris Broad
14 March	Australia	Scotland	Steve Bucknor	Asoka de Silva	Tony Hill	Mark Benson	Javagal Srinath
14 March	Canada	Kenya	Asad Rauf	Peter Parker	Billy Doctrove	Rudi Koertzen	Mike Procter
15 March	Bermuda	Sri Lanka	Daryl Harper	Ian Howell	Aleem Dar	Steve Davis	Jeff Crowe
15 March	Ireland	Zimbabwe	Ian Gould	Brian Jerling	Billy Bowden	Simon Taufel	Roshan Mahanama
16 March	South Africa	Netherlands	Mark Benson	Tony Hill	Steve Bucknor	Asoka de Silva	Ranjan Madugalle
16 March	England	New Zealand	Rudi Koertzen	Asad Rauf	Peter Parker	Billy Doctrove	Mike Procter
17 March	India	Bangladesh	Aleem Dar	Steve Davis	Ian Howell	Daryl Harper	Alan Hurst
17 March	Ireland	Pakistan	Billy Bowden	Brian Jerling	Simon Taufel	Ian Gould	Chris Broad
18 March	Australia	Netherlands	Steve Bucknor	Tony Hill	Asoka de Silva	Mark Benson	Javagal Srinath
18 March	England	Canada	Billy Doctrove	Peter Parker	Asad Rauf	Rudi Koertzen	Jeff Crowe
19 March	India	Bermuda	Aleem Dar	Ian Howell	Daryl Harper	Steve Davis	Alan Hurst
19 March	West Indies	Zimbabwe	Ian Gould	Simon Taufel	Billy Bowden	Brian Jerling	Roshan Mahanama
20 March	South Africa	Scotland	Mark Benson	Asoka de Silva	Steve Bucknor	Tony Hill	Ranjan Madugalle
20 March	New Zealand	Kenya	Billy Doctrove	Rudi Koertzen	Peter Parker	Asad Rauf	Mike Procter
21 March	Sri Lanka	Bangladesh	Daryl Harper	Steve Davis	Ian Howell	Aleem Dar	Jeff Crowe
21 March	Zimbabwe	Pakistan	Simon Taufel	Brian Jerling	Ian Gould	Billy Bowden	Chris Broad
22 March	Scotland	Netherlands	Asoka de Silva	Tony Hill	Mark Benson	Steve Bucknor	Javagal Srinath
22 March	New Zealand	Canada	Billy Doctrove	Asad Rauf	Rudi Koertzen	Peter Parker	Mike Procter
23 March	India	Sri Lanka	Aleem Dar	Daryl Harper	Steve Davis	Ian Howell	Jeff Crowe
23 March	West Indies	Ireland	Billy Bowden	Ian Gould	Brian Jerling	Simon Taufel	Roshan Mahanama
24 March	South Africa	Australia	Steve Bucknor	Mark Benson	Tony Hill	Asoka de Silva	Ranjan Madugalle
24 March	England	Kenya	Rudi Koertzen	Peter Parker	Billy Doctrove	Asad Rauf	Mike Procter
25 March	Bermuda	Bangladesh	Steve Davis	Ian Howell	Aleem Dar	Daryl Harper	Alan Hurst

=== Super 8 stage appointments ===
Umpires:
Only umpires from the Elite Panel of ICC Umpires officiated from the Super Eight stage of the competition until its conclusion.

Referees:
Chris Broad, Mike Procter, Jeff Crowe, Ranjan Madugalle were chosen to officiate the matches from the Super Eight stage onwards.

Date	Team 1	Team 2	Umpire	Umpire	3rd umpire	4th umpire	Referee
27 March	West Indies	Australia	Asad Rauf	Aleem Dar	Billy Bowden	Rudi Koertzen	Chris Broad
28 March	South Africa	Sri Lanka	Steve Bucknor	Daryl Harper	Mark Benson	Simon Taufel	Jeff Crowe
29 March	West Indies	New Zealand	Asad Rauf	Rudi Koertzen	Aleem Dar	Billy Bowden	Mike Procter
30 March	England	Ireland	Simon Taufel	Billy Doctrove	Daryl Harper	Steve Bucknor	Ranjan Madugalle
31 March	Australia	Bangladesh	Aleem Dar	Billy Bowden	Rudi Koertzen	Asad Rauf	Chris Broad
1 April	West Indies	Sri Lanka	Mark Benson	Daryl Harper	Simon Taufel	Steve Bucknor	Jeff Crowe
2 April	New Zealand	Bangladesh	Aleem Dar	Rudi Koertzen	Asad Rauf	Billy Bowden	Mike Procter
3 April	South Africa	Ireland	Simon Taufel	Daryl Harper	Mark Benson	Billy Doctrove	Ranjan Madugalle
4 April	England	Sri Lanka	Asad Rauf	Billy Bowden	Rudi Koertzen	Aleem Dar	Jeff Crowe
7 April	South Africa	Bangladesh	Mark Benson	Billy Doctrove	Steve Bucknor	Daryl Harper	Chris Broad
8 April	Australia	England	Billy Bowden	Rudi Koertzen	Asad Rauf	Norman Malcolm	Mike Procter
9 April	New Zealand	Ireland	Steve Bucknor	Simon Taufel	Billy Doctrove	Goland Greaves	Ranjan Madugalle
10 April	West Indies	South Africa	Mark Benson	Daryl Harper	Aleem Dar	Asad Rauf	Chris Broad
11 April	England	Bangladesh	Steve Bucknor	Simon Taufel	Rudi Koertzen	Billy Bowden	Jeff Crowe
12 April	Sri Lanka	New Zealand	Asad Rauf	Billy Doctrove	Aleem Dar	Mark Benson	Mike Procter
13 April	Australia	Ireland	Billy Bowden	Rudi Koertzen	Steve Bucknor	Simon Taufel	Ranjan Madugalle
14 April	South Africa	New Zealand	Mark Benson	Daryl Harper	Billy Doctrove	Asad Rauf	Chris Broad
15 April	Bangladesh	Ireland	Steve Bucknor	Billy Bowden	Simon Taufel	Rudi Koertzen	Jeff Crowe
16 April	Australia	Sri Lanka	Billy Doctrove	Aleem Dar	Mark Benson	Daryl Harper	Mike Procter
17 April	England	South Africa	Steve Bucknor	Simon Taufel	Billy Bowden	Rudi Koertzen	Ranjan Madugalle
18 April	Ireland	Sri Lanka	Mark Benson	Billy Doctrove	Daryl Harper	Aleem Dar	Chris Broad
19 April	West Indies	Bangladesh	Billy Bowden	Rudi Koertzen	Simon Taufel	Steve Bucknor	Jeff Crowe
20 April	Australia	New Zealand	Asad Rauf	Aleem Dar	Billy Doctrove	Daryl Harper	Mike Procter
21 April	West Indies	England	Simon Taufel	Rudi Koertzen	Billy Bowden	Steve Bucknor	Ranjan Madugalle

=== Semi-finals ===
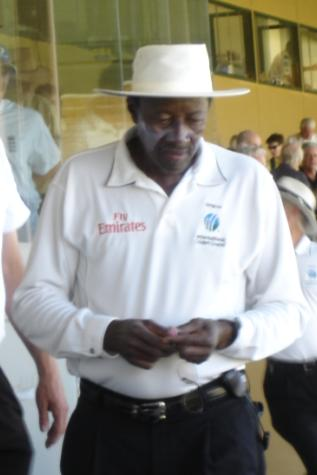
Steve Bucknor, who stood in his fifth consecutive World Cup final in the 2007 competition.

After a review of the performance of the umpires throughout the tournament the best four umpires were appointed to officiate on-field in the semi-finals. The role of third umpire will be filled by the two next best umpires, and likewise for the fourth umpire appointments.

Date	Team 1	Team 2	Umpire	Umpire	3rd umpire	4th umpire	Referee
24 April	New Zealand	Sri Lanka	Simon Taufel	Rudi Koertzen	Daryl Harper	Asad Rauf	Mike Procter
25 April	Australia	South Africa	Steve Bucknor	Aleem Dar	Billy Bowden	Mark Benson	Jeff Crowe

Of the appointed umpires, Bucknor and Koertzen have stood on-field before in World Cup semi-finals. Taufel and Dar served as third and fourth umpires respectively in the semi-finals of the previous tournament in 2003.

=== Final ===
The two on-field umpires for the final were chosen after a performance review, such that they are the two best umpires from the tournament (independent of the competing nations). The third and fourth umpire roles were filled by the same process.

Since the officials had to be independent of the two nations participating in the final, Simon Taufel and Daryl Harper were ineligible to umpire, whilst Ranjan Madugalle could not serve as the match referee.

Date	Team 1	Team 2	Umpire	Umpire	3rd umpire	4th umpire	Referee
28 April	Australia	Sri Lanka	Steve Bucknor	Aleem Dar	Rudi Koertzen	Billy Bowden	Jeff Crowe

This was Aleem Dar's first appointment in a World Cup final, and prior to the match had said that it was to be the most important game of his career to date. Steve Bucknor, on the other hand, stood in his fifth consecutive World Cup final, extending his previous record of four in a row, though this competition held a special note, having been held in his native West Indies. He said that this appointment was a dream come true.

== Criticism of umpires ==
Majority of the tournament was passed without any major criticism of the umpires or errors on their part, however the final was wrought with confusion and was described as a "farcical finish" to the competition.

Rain affected the start of the match, reducing the contest to 38 overs a side, and further rain reduced the Sri Lankan innings to 36 overs. With Australia almost certain victors with just 3 overs to go, bad light began to affect play and the umpires seemed to offer the Sri Lankans the opportunity to leave the field for bad light. Both teams assumed this would have granted Australia victory that evening, but they were soon informed that if the light improved the match would have to continue; and if not then the final 3 overs would be played the next day. Sri Lanka's batsmen eventually came out and played out the final 3 overs regardless, and Australia were eventually crowned champions.

Match referee Jeff Crowe revealed a "communication breakdown" between himself, on-field umpires Aleem Dar and Steve Bucknor and third umpire Rudi Koertzen was to blame for the mix-up, which overlooked Law 21 of the laws of cricket. The law states that, in a One Day International, providing a minimum of 20 overs have been played then a result can be reached using the Duckworth-Lewis system.

The ICC issued a statement apologising for occurrence of the incident, but said that none of those involved would be sacked. Two months later it was announced that all five officials involved - the two on field umpires, the third and fourth umpires and the match referee - were to be reprimanded by suspension to prevent them officiating in the 2007 Twenty20 World Championship.
