= 2011 Cricket World Cup officials =

Officials for the 2011 Cricket World Cup were selected by the Umpire Selection Panel and the information was released on 12 December 2010. The panel selected 18 umpires and a reserve umpire, Enamul Haque to officiate at the World Cup: five were from Australia, six from Asia, three from England, two from New Zealand and one each from South Africa and West Indies. It also selected five match referees for the event.

The panel consisted of David Richardson (ICC general manager - cricket), Ranjan Madugalle (ICC chief match referee), David Lloyd (former player, coach, umpire and then television commentator) and Srinivas Venkataraghavan (former elite panel umpire).

== Umpires ==
Out of the selected umpires, 12 belonged to the Elite Panel of ICC Umpires while the remaining six belong to the International Panel of Umpires and Referees. In addition, a reserve umpire Enamul Haque from Bangladesh was selected officiated in the warm-up matches and if required, during the event.

The members of the Elite Panel of ICC umpires are generally thought to be the best umpires in the world and hence officiate in almost all senior cricket tournaments and ICC events. The remaining six were identified as emerging and talented match officials, who had already officiated at international level with the experience of conditions in the Asian sub-continent and were thought to be ready to umpire in the World Cup.

Aleem Dar and Simon Taufel were selected to umpire the final, their second and first World Cup final respectively.

Umpire	Country	Panel	Matches	WC Matches	2011 WC
Asad Rauf	Pakistan	Elite Panel of ICC Umpires	83	8	5
Billy Bowden	New Zealand	Elite Panel of ICC Umpires	150	16	5
Billy Doctrove	West Indies	Elite Panel of ICC Umpires	101	8	5
Aleem Dar	Pakistan	Elite Panel of ICC Umpires	138	14	8
Simon Taufel	Australia	Elite Panel of ICC Umpires	159	15	8
Steve Davis	Australia	Elite Panel of ICC Umpires	97	3	7
Tony Hill	New Zealand	Elite Panel of ICC Umpires	79	3	5
Asoka de Silva	Sri Lanka	Elite Panel of ICC Umpires	110	10	4
Ian Gould	England	Elite Panel of ICC Umpires	48	3	7
Daryl Harper	Australia	Elite Panel of ICC Umpires	169	16	5
Marais Erasmus	South Africa	Elite Panel of ICC Umpires	26	0	6
Rod Tucker	Australia	Elite Panel of ICC Umpires	18	0	6
Shavir Tarapore	India	International Panel of Umpires and Referees	16	0	4
Bruce Oxenford	Australia	International Panel of Umpires and Referees	21	1	5
Amiesh Saheba	India	International Panel of Umpires and Referees	47	0	4
Richard Kettleborough	England	International Panel of Umpires and Referees	12	0	4
Nigel Llong	England	International Panel of Umpires and Referees	39	0	5
Kumar Dharmasena	Sri Lanka	International Panel of Umpires and Referees	20	1	5
Enamul Haque (reserve)	Bangladesh	International Panel of Umpires and Referees	31	0	0

== Referees ==
Five referees were also selected by the selection panel, all belonged to the Elite Panel of ICC Referees. Jeff Crowe was the referee in the final.

Referee	Country	Matches	WC Matches	2011 WC
Ranjan Madugalle	Sri Lanka	252	33	13
Roshan Mahanama	Sri Lanka	151	3	12
Andy Pycroft	Zimbabwe	30	0	3
Jeff Crowe	New Zealand	131	12	9
Chris Broad	England	177	9	12
