= 2017 Champions Trophy =

2017 International cricket tournament

2017 ICC Champions Trophy
- Dates: 1 June – 18 June 2017
- Administrator: International Cricket Council
- Cricket format: One Day International
- Tournament format(s): Round-robin and knockout
- Hosts: England; Wales
- Champions: Pakistan (1st title)
- Runners-up: India
- Participants: 8
- Matches: 15
- Player of the series: (Pakistan) Hasan Ali
- Most runs: (India) Shikhar Dhawan (338)
- Most wickets: (Pakistan) Hasan Ali (13)
- Official website: ICC Champions Trophy

The 2017 ICC Champions Trophy was the eighth edition of the ICC Champions Trophy, a quadrennial One Day International (ODI) cricket tournament organized by the International Cricket Council (ICC). It was held in England and Wales from 1 to 18 June 2017, with England hosting the tournament for the third time and Wales, the second.

The tournament was contested by eight national teams, maintaining the same format used in 2013. After two weeks of round-robin matches, India, England, Pakistan, and Bangladesh finished as the top four and qualified for the knockout stage. In the knockout stage, India and Pakistan beat Bangladesh and England, respectively, to advance to the final, played on 18 June at The Oval in London. Pakistan won the one-sided final by 180 runs, winning their first Champions Trophy.

== Background ==
The top eight teams in the ICC ODI Championship rankings as on 30 September 2015 qualified for the tournament, and were divided into two groups of four. Bangladesh returned to the ICC Champions Trophy for the first time since 2006, while the West Indies failed to qualify for the first time.

Security around the tournament was increased following the Ariana Grande concert attack by terrorist in Manchester, just before the start of the competition. The International Cricket Council (ICC) announced that they would review security concerns.

The ICC Champions Trophy was due to end in 2013, with the 2013 competition the final one, to be replaced by the ICC World Test Championship in 2017. However, in January 2014 it was instead confirmed by the ICC that a Champions Trophy tournament would take place in 2017. In 2016, the ICC confirmed that the Champions Trophy would be scrapped after this tournament, keeping in line with the ICC's goal of having one tournament for each of the three formats of international cricket. In November 2021, the ICC confirmed that the tournament would return in 2025, hosted in Pakistan.

== Summary ==
Rain and poor weather affected 5 of the 15 matches played in the tournament. The top two teams in the ICC ODI Rankings at the time (South Africa and Australia) were knocked out in the group stage, with Australia not winning a single game out of their three. 2015 World Cup finalists New Zealand were also knocked out in the group stage, also not winning a single game. Thus, England and Bangladesh from Group A, and India and Pakistan from Group B qualified for the semi-finals. Pakistan beat England comfortably in the first semi-final, winning by 8 wickets with almost 13 overs to spare to make their first final ever in the Champions Trophy. India beat Bangladesh in the second semi-final, also winning comfortably by 9 wickets, in what was Bangladesh's first semi-final in an ICC tournament.

The prize money for the 2017 edition of the ICC Champions Trophy was increased by half a million dollars from 2013 to a total of $4.5 million. The winning team got a cheque of $2.2 million and the runner-up got $1.1 million. The other two semifinalists earned $450,000 each. Teams finishing third in each group took home $90,000 each, while the teams finishing last in each group got $60,000 each.

== Qualification ==
As hosts, England qualified for the competition automatically; they were joined by the seven other highest-ranked teams in the ICC ODI Championship as at 30 September 2015.

Qualification	Date	Berths	Country
Host	January 2014	1	England
ODI Championship	30 September 2015	7	Australia
ODI Championship	30 September 2015	7	India
ODI Championship	30 September 2015	7	South Africa
ODI Championship	30 September 2015	7	New Zealand
ODI Championship	30 September 2015	7	Sri Lanka
ODI Championship	30 September 2015	7	Bangladesh
ODI Championship	30 September 2015	7	Pakistan

== Venues ==
On 1 June 2016, it was announced that the 2017 ICC Champions Trophy would be held across three venues: The Oval, Edgbaston and Sophia Gardens. The ICC confirmed the umpires for all matches and venues on 18 May 2017.

London	Birmingham	Cardiff
The Oval	Edgbaston Cricket Ground	Sophia Gardens
Capacity: 26,000	Capacity: 23,500	Capacity: 15,643

== Match officials ==
The match referees' responsibilities throughout the men's tournament were shared between three members of the Elite Panel of ICC Referees :

- (Australia) David Boon
- (England) Chris Broad
- (Zimbabwe) Andy Pycroft

The on-field responsibilities for officiating the men's tournament were shared between 12 members of the Elite Panel of ICC Umpires:

- (Pakistan) Aleem Dar
- (Sri Lanka) Kumar Dharmasena
- (South Africa) Marais Erasmus
- (New Zealand) Chris Gaffaney
- (England) Ian Gould
- (England) Richard Illingworth
- (England) Richard Kettleborough
- (England) Nigel Llong
- (Australia) Bruce Oxenford
- (India) Sundaram Ravi
- (Australia) Paul Reiffel
- (Australia) Rod Tucker

== Squads ==
The eight participating teams were required to announce a 15-member squad for the tournament on or before 25 April 2017. Teams could make changes to their originally named squads up to 25 May 2017, after which date changes would only be accepted on medical grounds, subject to approval.

India did not announce their squad by 25 April deadline due to what it described as "operational" reasons, although this was widely seen as a protest by the Board of Control for Cricket in India (BCCI) in an ongoing disagreement with the ICC over finance and governance. The BCCI were scheduled to announce the squad for India after the ICC board meeting on 27 April 2017. However, on 4 May 2017, after no team had been named, the committee of administrators told the BCCI to select their squad immediately. The BCCI undertook a special general meeting on 7 May 2017 to determine what course of action they would take. The outcome of that meeting was that India would take part in the tournament, and the squad was named on 8 May 2017.

On 10 May 2017, the ICC confirmed all the squads for the tournament. Pakistan's Shoaib Malik played in his sixth consecutive Champions Trophy.

== Warm-up matches ==
Before the tournament started, England and South Africa played a bilateral three-match ODI series leaving the other six teams to play warm-ups against two other teams not in their group. These warm-up matches had rules that were slightly different from normal ODI matches, and were thus not recognised as ODIs. A team could use up to 15 players in a match, but only 11 could bat (or field at any one time) in each innings.

== Group stage ==
The fixtures were announced on 1 June 2016.

Tiebreakers
The teams are ranked according to points (2 for a win, 1 for a tied, abandoned or no result game, and 0 for loss). If two or more teams are equal on points on completion of the group matches, the following criteria are applied in the order given to determine the rankings:
1. The team with the most wins in the Group matches will be placed in the higher position.
2. If there are teams with equal points and equal wins, the team with the higher net run rate in the Group matches will be placed in the higher position
3. If two or more teams are still equal, they will be ordered according to the head-to-head matches played between them (points then net run rate in those matches).
4. In the highly unlikely event that teams cannot be separated by the above, teams will be ordered according to their seeded group position.
5. If all matches within a Group are a no result, the top 2 teams by their seeded group positions will progress to the semi-finals.

=== Group A ===
Pos	Team	Pld	W	L	T	NR	Pts	NRR
1	England	3	3	0	0	0	6	1.045
2	Bangladesh	3	1	1	0	1	3	0.000
3	Australia	3	0	1	0	2	2	−0.992
4	New Zealand	3	0	2	0	1	1	−1.058

Source: ESPN Cricinfo

Advanced to knock-out stage

1 June 2017
10:30
Scorecard

Bangladesh; 305/6 (50 overs)	v	England; 308/2 (47.2 overs)
Tamim Iqbal 128 (142); Liam Plunkett 4/59 (10 overs)		Joe Root 133* (129); Sabbir Rahman 1/13 (1 over)

England won by 8 wickets
The Oval, London
Umpires: Sundaram Ravi (Ind) and Rod Tucker (Aus)
Player of the match: Joe Root (Eng)

- England won the toss and elected to field.
- This was the first time a 300-plus total had been successfully chased down in the history of the Champions Trophy.
- Points: England 2, Bangladesh 0.

2 June 2017
10:30
Scorecard

New Zealand; 291 (45 overs)	v	Australia; 53/3 (9 overs)
Kane Williamson 100 (97); Josh Hazlewood 6/52 (9 overs)		Moisés Henriques 18 (14); Adam Milne 2/9 (2 overs)

No result
Edgbaston, Birmingham
Umpires: Richard Illingworth (Eng) and Richard Kettleborough (Eng)

- New Zealand won the toss and elected to bat.
- Rain initially reduced the match to 46 overs per side, with further rain setting Australia a revised target of 235 runs from 33 overs. Another rain delay prevented any further play.
- Josh Hazlewood (Aus) returned the second-best bowling figures in the history of the Champions Trophy with 6/52.
- Points: Australia 1, New Zealand 1.

5 June 2017
13:30 (D/N)
Scorecard

Bangladesh; 182 (44.3 overs)	v	Australia; 83/1 (16 overs)
Tamim Iqbal 95 (114); Mitchell Starc 4/29 (8.3 overs)		David Warner 40* (44); Rubel Hossain 1/21 (4 overs)

No result
The Oval, London
Umpires: Chris Gaffaney (NZ) and Nigel Llong (Eng)

- Bangladesh won the toss and elected to bat.
- Rain during Australia's innings prevented any further play.
- This was Australia's 900th ODI match.
- David Warner (Aus) became the fastest Australian batsman, in terms of innings, to make 4,000 runs in ODIs (93).
- Points: Australia 1, Bangladesh 1.

6 June 2017
10:30
Scorecard

England; 310 (49.3 overs)	v	New Zealand; 223 (44.3 overs)
Joe Root 64 (65); Corey Anderson 3/55 (9 overs)		Kane Williamson 87 (98); Liam Plunkett 4/55 (9.3 overs)

England won by 87 runs
Sophia Gardens, Cardiff
Umpires: Bruce Oxenford (Aus) and Paul Reiffel (Aus)
Player of the match: Jake Ball (Eng)

- New Zealand won the toss and elected to field.
- Points: England 2, New Zealand 0.
- England qualified for the semi-finals as a result of this match.

9 June 2017
10:30
Scorecard

New Zealand; 265/8 (50 overs)	v	Bangladesh; 268/5 (47.2 overs)
Ross Taylor 63 (82); Mosaddek Hossain 3/13 (3 overs)		Shakib Al Hasan 114 (115); Tim Southee 3/45 (9 overs)

Bangladesh won by 5 wickets
Sophia Gardens, Cardiff
Umpires: Ian Gould (Eng) and Nigel Llong (Eng)
Player of the match: Shakib Al Hasan (Ban)

- New Zealand won the toss and elected to bat.
- Mahmudullah and Shakib Al Hasan made the highest partnership for any wicket for Bangladesh in an ODI (224).
- This was Bangladesh's first victory in the history of the Champions Trophy.
- Points: Bangladesh 2, New Zealand 0.
- New Zealand were eliminated as a result of this match.

10 June 2017
10:30
Scorecard

Australia; 277/9 (50 overs)	v	England; 240/4 (40.2 overs)
Travis Head 71* (64); Mark Wood 4/33 (10 overs)		Ben Stokes 102* (109); Josh Hazlewood 2/50 (9 overs)

England won by 40 runs (DLS method)
Edgbaston, Birmingham
Umpires: Kumar Dharmasena (SL) and Chris Gaffaney (NZ)
Player of the match: Ben Stokes (Eng)

- England won the toss and elected to field.
- Rain during England's innings prevented any further play.
- Points: England 2, Australia 0.
- Australia were eliminated and Bangladesh qualified for the semi-finals for the first time as a result of this match.

=== Group B ===
Pos	Team	Pld	W	L	T	NR	Pts	NRR
1	India	3	2	1	0	0	4	1.370
2	Pakistan	3	2	1	0	0	4	−0.680
3	South Africa	3	1	2	0	0	2	0.167
4	Sri Lanka	3	1	2	0	0	2	−0.798

Source: ESPN Cricinfo

Advanced to knock-out stage

3 June 2017
10:30
Scorecard

South Africa; 299/6 (50 overs)	v	Sri Lanka; 203 (41.3 overs)
Hashim Amla 103 (115); Nuwan Pradeep 2/54 (10 overs)		Upul Tharanga 57 (69); Imran Tahir 4/27 (8.3 overs)

South Africa won by 96 runs
The Oval, London
Umpires: Aleem Dar (Pak) and Ian Gould (Eng)
Player of the match: Imran Tahir (SA)

- Sri Lanka won the toss and elected to field.
- Hashim Amla (SA) became the fastest batsman, in terms of innings, to make 25 centuries in ODIs (151).
- Due to the slow over rate, Sri Lanka's captain Upul Tharanga was suspended for two matches.
- Points: South Africa 2, Sri Lanka 0.

4 June 2017
10:30
Scorecard

India; 319/3 (48 overs)	v	Pakistan; 164/9 (33.4 overs)
Rohit Sharma 91 (119); Shadab Khan 1/52 (10 overs)		Azhar Ali 50 (65); Umesh Yadav 3/30 (7.4 overs)

India won by 124 runs (DLS method)
Edgbaston, Birmingham
Umpires: Kumar Dharmasena (SL) and Marais Erasmus (SA)
Player of the match: Yuvraj Singh (Ind)

- Pakistan won the toss and elected to field.
- Rain reduced the match to 48 overs per side, with further rain setting Pakistan a revised target of 289 runs from 41 overs.
- Wahab Riaz (Pak) recorded the worst bowling figures in the history of the Champions Trophy with 0/87.
- Points: India 2, Pakistan 0.

7 June 2017
13:30 (D/N)
Scorecard

South Africa; 219/8 (50 overs)	v	Pakistan; 119/3 (27 overs)
David Miller 75* (104); Hasan Ali 3/24 (8 overs)		Fakhar Zaman 31 (23); Morne Morkel 3/18 (7 overs)

Pakistan won by 19 runs (DLS method)
Edgbaston, Birmingham
Umpires: Richard Illingworth (Eng) and Sundaram Ravi (Ind)
Player of the match: Hasan Ali (Pak)

- South Africa won the toss and elected to bat.
- Rain during Pakistan's innings prevented any further play.
- Fakhar Zaman (Pak) made his ODI debut.
- Points: Pakistan 2, South Africa 0.

8 June 2017
10:30
Scorecard

India; 321/6 (50 overs)	v	Sri Lanka; 322/3 (48.4 overs)
Shikhar Dhawan 125 (128); Lasith Malinga 2/70 (10 overs)		Kusal Mendis 89 (93); Bhuvneshwar Kumar 1/54 (10 overs)

Sri Lanka won by 7 wickets
The Oval, London
Umpires: Richard Kettleborough (Eng) and Rod Tucker (Aus)
Player of the match: Kusal Mendis (SL)

- Sri Lanka won the toss and elected to field.
- This was the 150th ODI match between the two sides.
- This was Sri Lanka's joint-highest successful run-chase in ODIs and the highest successful run chase by any team in the history of the Champions Trophy.
- Points: Sri Lanka 2, India 0.

11 June 2017
10:30
Scorecard

South Africa; 191 (44.3 overs)	v	India; 193/2 (38 overs)
Quinton de Kock 53 (72); Bhuvneshwar Kumar 2/22 (7.3 overs)		Shikhar Dhawan 78 (83); Imran Tahir 1/37 (6 overs)

India won by 8 wickets
The Oval, London
Umpires: Aleem Dar (Pak) and Paul Reiffel (Aus)
Player of the match: Jasprit Bumrah (Ind)

- India won the toss and elected to field.
- Points: India 2, South Africa 0.
- India qualified for the semi-finals and South Africa were eliminated as a result of this match.

12 June 2017
10:30
Scorecard

Sri Lanka; 236 (49.2 overs)	v	Pakistan; 237/7 (44.5 overs)
Niroshan Dickwella 73 (86); Junaid Khan 3/40 (10 overs)		Sarfaraz Ahmed 61* (79); Nuwan Pradeep 3/60 (10 overs)

Pakistan won by 3 wickets
Sophia Gardens, Cardiff
Umpires: Marais Erasmus (SA) and Bruce Oxenford (Aus)
Player of the match: Sarfaraz Ahmed (Pak)

- Pakistan won the toss and elected to field.
- Faheem Ashraf (Pak) made his ODI debut.
- Points: Pakistan 2, Sri Lanka 0.
- Pakistan qualified for the semi-finals and Sri Lanka were eliminated as a result of this match.

== Knockout stage ==
Semi-finals
A1	England	211 (49.5 overs)
B2	Pakistan	215/2 (37.1 overs)
A2	Bangladesh	264/7 (50 overs)
B1	India	265/1 (40.1 overs)

Final
B2	Pakistan	338/4 (50 overs)
B1	India	158 (30.3 overs)

=== Semi-finals ===
England became the first team to qualify for the semi-finals by virtue of two wins in its first two Group A games, and with other teams of the group either losing a game or ending games without a result. Bangladesh qualified for the semi-finals following their win against New Zealand, and Australia failing to beat England in the final match of Group A. From Group B, India and Pakistan qualified for the semi-finals following victories in their final group matches against South Africa and Sri Lanka respectively.

The ICC confirmed the umpires for the semi-final matches on 13 June 2017 and for the final on 16 June 2017. Pakistan beat England by 8 wickets to qualify for the final for the first time while India beat Bangladesh by 9 wickets to make their second consecutive appearance and fourth overall in a final.

14 June 2017
10:30
Scorecard

England; 211 (49.5 overs)	v	Pakistan; 215/2 (37.1 overs)
Joe Root 46 (56); Hasan Ali 3/35 (10 overs)		Azhar Ali 76 (100); Jake Ball 1/37 (8 overs)

Pakistan won by 8 wickets
Sophia Gardens, Cardiff
Umpires: Marais Erasmus (SA) and Rod Tucker (Aus)
Player of the match: Hasan Ali (Pak)

- Pakistan won the toss and elected to field.
- Rumman Raees (Pak) made his ODI debut.
- This was the first time that Pakistan had qualified for a Champions Trophy final and it was their first final in an ICC ODI competition since 1999.

15 June 2017
10:30
Scorecard

Bangladesh; 264/7 (50 overs)	v	India; 265/1 (40.1 overs)
Tamim Iqbal 70 (82); Kedar Jadhav 2/22 (6 overs)		Rohit Sharma 123* (129); Mashrafe Mortaza 1/29 (8 overs)

India won by 9 wickets
Edgbaston, Birmingham
Umpires: Kumar Dharmasena (SL) and Richard Kettleborough (Eng)
Player of the match: Rohit Sharma (Ind)

- India won the toss and elected to field.
- This was Bangladesh's first appearance in a semi-final of any ICC competition.
- Yuvraj Singh played in his 300th ODI.
- Virat Kohli (Ind) became the fastest batsman, in terms of innings, to reach 8,000 runs in ODIs (175).

=== Final ===
18 June 2017
10:30
Scorecard

Pakistan; 338/4 (50 overs)	v	India; 158 (30.3 overs)
Fakhar Zaman 114 (106); Kedar Jadhav 1/27 (3 overs)		Hardik Pandya 76 (43); Mohammad Amir 3/16 (6 overs)

Pakistan won by 180 runs
The Oval, London
Umpires: Marais Erasmus (SA) and Richard Kettleborough (Eng)
Player of the match: Fakhar Zaman (Pak)

- India won the toss and elected to field.
- Fakhar Zaman (Pak) scored his first century in ODIs.
- Pakistan won the ICC Champions Trophy for the first time.
- Pakistan's total was their highest in any ICC tournament final.
- The margin of victory was the largest in any ICC ODI tournament final in terms of runs.

== Statistics ==
=== Batting ===
Most runs

Player	Mat	Inns	Runs	Ave	HS
(India) Shikhar Dhawan	5	5	338	67.60	125
(India) Rohit Sharma	5	5	304	76.00	123*
(Bangladesh) Tamim Iqbal	4	4	293	73.25	128
(England) Joe Root	4	4	258	86.00	133*
(India) Virat Kohli	5	5	258	129.00	96*
Source: ESPN Cricinfo

=== Bowling ===
Most wickets

Player	Mat	Inns	Wkts	Ave	Econ	BBI
(Pakistan) Hasan Ali	5	5	13	14.69	4.29	3/19
(Australia) Josh Hazlewood	3	3	9	15.77	5.07	6/52
(Pakistan) Junaid Khan	4	4	8	19.37	4.58	3/40
(England) Liam Plunkett	4	4	8	24.50	5.85	4/55
(England) Adil Rashid	3	3	7	20.28	4.73	4/41
Source: ESPN Cricinfo

=== Team of the tournament ===
The team of the tournament was named by the ICC the day after the final. The team included seven members of the 22 players who featured in the final, as well as three Englishmen, a Bangladeshi and a New Zealander.

1. (India) Shikhar Dhawan
2. (Pakistan) Fakhar Zaman
3. (Bangladesh) Tamim Iqbal
4. (India) Virat Kohli
5. (England) Joe Root
6. (England) Ben Stokes
7. (Pakistan) Sarfaraz Ahmed (c & wk)
8. (England) Adil Rashid
9. (Pakistan) Junaid Khan
10. (India) Bhuvneshwar Kumar
11. (Pakistan) Hasan Ali
12. (New Zealand) Kane Williamson (12th man)

== Media and promotion ==
In a media release before the commencement of the tournament, the ICC stated that live broadcast would be made available in "more than 200 territories, across five continents". The release added that the tournament's broadcast would reach China, South Korea, Thailand and Indonesia for the first time.

The prize money for the competition was increased by $500,000 from 2013 to a total of $4.5 million. The winning team received $2.2 million, with $1.1 million going to the runner-up. The other two semi-finalists earned $450,000 each. Teams finishing third and fourth in each group each received $90,000 and $60,000 respectively.
