= 2023 Cricket World Cup officials =

Match officials for the Cricket World Cup

Match officials for the 2023 Cricket World Cup were selected by the International Cricket Council (ICC) umpire selection panel, headed by Sean Easey, the ICC's senior manager for umpires and referees. The panel selected 12 umpires to officiate at the tournament: three from Australia, four from England, four from Asia (one each from Bangladesh, India, Pakistan and Sri Lanka), two each from New Zealand and South Africa and one from the West Indies. It also selected four match referees for the event.

== Umpires ==
Of the 16 umpires selected for the tournament, 12 were from the ICC Elite Panel while the remaining four were from the International Panel.

Sharfuddoula became the first Bangladeshi umpire to be selected as one of the umpires for the Men's World Cup.

Umpire	Country	Panel	Matches (before 2023 WC)	WC Matches (before 2023)	2023 WC Matches
Kumar Dharmasena	Sri Lanka	Elite Panel	121	21	6
Marais Erasmus	South Africa	Elite Panel	117	19	6
Chris Gaffaney	New Zealand	Elite Panel	80	9	6
Michael Gough	England	Elite Panel	79	8	6
Adrian Holdstock	South Africa	Elite Panel	48	0	6 (Note: Replaced Richard Kettleborough in the match between India vs New Zealand on 22 October.)
Richard Illingworth	England	Elite Panel	82	11	8 (Note: Including Semi Final 1 and the Final.)
Richard Kettleborough	England	Elite Panel	98	19	7 (Note: Replaced by Adrian Holdstock in the match between India vs New Zealand on 22 October.) (Note: Including Semi Final 2 and the Final.)
Nitin Menon	India	Elite Panel	50	0	7 (Note: Including Semi Final 2.)
Ahsan Raza	Pakistan	Elite Panel	45	0	6 (Note: Replaced Alex Wharf in the match between Bangladesh vs South Africa on 24 October.)
Paul Reiffel	Australia	Elite Panel	82	9	6
Rod Tucker	Australia	Elite Panel	93	18	7 (Note: Including Semi Final)
Joel Wilson	(Cricket West Indies) West Indies	Elite Panel	85	8	7 (Note: Replaced Alex Wharf in the match between Australia vs Sri Lanka on 16 October.)
Chris Brown	New Zealand	International Panel	22	0	5
Sharfuddoula	Bangladesh	International Panel	54	0	5
Alex Wharf	England	International Panel	18	0	3 (Note: Replaced by Joel Wilson in the match between Australia vs Sri Lanka on 16 October) (Note: Replaced by Ahsan Raza in the match between Bangladesh vs South Africa on 24 October.)
Paul Wilson	Australia	International Panel	39	5	5

== Referees ==
Four referees were selected by the selection panel for this World Cup. All the selected referees belonged to the Elite Panel of ICC Referees.

Referee	Country	Matches (before 2023 WC)	WC Matches (before 2023)	2023 WC Matches
Jeff Crowe	New Zealand	315	34	11
Andy Pycroft	Zimbabwe	208	8	14
Richie Richardson	(Cricket West Indies) West Indies	82	6	11
Javagal Srinath	India	257	3	12
