= 2013 Champions Trophy =

Cricket tournament

2013 ICC Champions Trophy
- Dates: 6 June – 23 June 2013
- Administrator: International Cricket Council
- Cricket format: One Day International
- Tournament format(s): Round-robin and knockout
- Hosts: England; Wales
- Champions: India (2nd title)
- Runners-up: England
- Participants: 8
- Matches: 15
- Player of the series: (India) Shikhar Dhawan
- Most runs: (India) Shikhar Dhawan (363)
- Most wickets: (India) Ravindra Jadeja (12)

The 2013 ICC Champions Trophy was the seventh edition of the ICC Champions Trophy, a quadrennial One Day International (ODI) cricket tournament organized by the International Cricket Council (ICC). The tournament was held in England and Wales between 6 and 23 June 2013. India won the tournament for the second time by defeating England in the final by 5 runs.

India received $2 million as prize money for winning the tournament, the largest amount since the tournament's inception. It was due to be the final ICC Champions Trophy, to be replaced by the ICC World Test Championship in 2017, but in January 2014, it was instead confirmed by the ICC that a Champions Trophy tournament would take place in 2017, with the proposed Test Championship being cancelled.

== Qualification ==
As hosts, England qualified for the competition automatically; they were joined by the seven other highest-ranked teams in the ICC ODI Championship as of 21 August 2012.

Qualification	Date	Berths	Country
Host	1 July 2010	1	England
ODI Championship	21 August 2012	7	South Africa
ODI Championship	21 August 2012	7	India
ODI Championship	21 August 2012	7	Australia
ODI Championship	21 August 2012	7	Sri Lanka
ODI Championship	21 August 2012	7	Pakistan
ODI Championship	21 August 2012	7	West Indies
ODI Championship	21 August 2012	7	New Zealand

== Rules and regulations ==
The 2013 ICC Champions Trophy was contested by eight teams, which were seeded and divided into two groups. Each team played every other team in its group once. Following the group stage, the top two teams from each group progressed to the semi-finals, where the winner of Group A played the runner-up of Group B and the winner of Group B played the runner-up of Group A.

=== Points system ===
Results	Points
Win	2 points
Tie/No result	1 point
Loss	0 points

== Venues ==
Three cities hosted the tournament's matches: London (at The Oval), Birmingham (at Edgbaston) and Cardiff (at Sophia Gardens, known as Cardiff Wales Stadium for the tournament).

London	Birmingham	Cardiff
The Oval	Edgbaston Cricket Ground	Sophia Gardens
Capacity: 26,000	Capacity: 23,500	Capacity: 15,643

== Match officials ==
The match referees’ responsibilities throughout the men's tournament were shared between three members of the Elite Panel of ICC Referees :

- (England) Chris Broad
- (Zimbabwe) Andy Pycroft
- (India) Javagal Srinath

The on-field responsibilities for officiating the men's tournament were shared between 12 members of the Elite Panel of ICC Umpires:

- (New Zealand) Billy Bowden
- (Pakistan) Aleem Dar
- (Sri Lanka) Kumar Dharmasena
- (Australia) Steve Davis
- (South Africa) Marais Erasmus
- (England) Ian Gould
- (New Zealand) Tony Hill
- (England) Richard Kettleborough
- (England) Nigel Llong
- (Australia) Bruce Oxenford
- ~~(Pakistan) Asad Rauf~~ (Note: Rauf's name cropped up during the 2013 IPL spot fixing controversy, prompting the ICC to remove him from the panel of match officials for the 2013 Champions Trophy.)
- (Australia) Rod Tucker

== Warm-up matches ==
The warm-up matches had rules that were slightly different from normal ODI matches, so they are not recognised as ODIs. A team could use up to 15 players in a match, but only 11 could bat or field in each innings.

30 May 2013
13:00 (D/N)
Scorecard

Pakistan	v	Sri Lanka

Match abandoned without a ball bowled
Edgbaston, Birmingham
Umpires: Bruce Oxenford (Aus) and Rod Tucker (Aus)

- No toss.
- Rain and a wet outfield prevented any play.

1 June 2013
10:30
Scorecard

Sri Lanka; 333/5 (50 overs)	v	India; 337/5 (49 overs)
Tillakaratne Dilshan 84 (78); Ishant Sharma 1/41 (6 overs)		Virat Kohli 144 (120); Shaminda Eranga 2/60 (9 overs)

India won by 5 wickets
Edgbaston, Birmingham
Umpires: Ian Gould (Eng) and Tony Hill (NZ)

- India won the toss and elected to field.

1 June 2013
13:00 (D/N)
Scorecard

West Indies; 256/9 (50 overs)	v	Australia; 259/6 (38.5 overs)
Darren Bravo 86 (99); Mitchell Starc 4/29 (7 overs)		Shane Watson 135 (98); Kemar Roach 2/44 (6 overs)

Australia won by 4 wickets
Sophia Gardens, Cardiff
Umpires: Kumar Dharmasena (SL) and Marais Erasmus (SA)

- West Indies won the toss and elected to bat.

3 June 2013
10:30
Scorecard

South Africa; 202/9 (50 overs)	v	Pakistan; 207/3 (45.3 overs)
Ryan McLaren 55 (72); Wahab Riaz 3/30 (9 overs)		Imran Farhat 56 (82); Lonwabo Tsotsobe 2/43 (8 overs)

Pakistan won by 7 wickets
The Oval, London
Umpires: Michael Gough (Eng) and Tim Robinson (Eng)

- Pakistan won the toss and elected to field.

4 June 2013
10:30
Scorecard

West Indies; 297/6 (50 overs)	v	Sri Lanka; 280 (47 overs)
Darren Bravo 71 (96); Thisara Perera 2/48 (9 overs)		Kumar Sangakkara 56 (62); Dwayne Bravo 3/26 (5 overs)

West Indies won by 17 runs
Edgbaston, Birmingham
Umpires: Nick Cook (Eng) and Peter Hartley (Eng)

- Sri Lanka won the toss and elected to field.

4 June 2013
10:30
Scorecard

India; 308/6 (50 overs)	v	Australia; 65 (23.3 overs)
Dinesh Karthik 146* (140); Clint McKay 2/39 (10 overs)		Adam Voges 23 (49); Umesh Yadav 5/18 (5 overs)

India won by 243 runs
Sophia Gardens, Cardiff
Umpires: Rob Bailey (Eng) and Neil Mallender (Eng)

- India won the toss and elected to bat.

== Group stage ==
=== Group A ===
Pos	Team	Pld	W	L	T	NR	Pts	NRR
1	England	3	2	1	0	0	4	0.308
2	Sri Lanka	3	2	1	0	0	4	−0.197
3	New Zealand	3	1	1	0	1	3	0.777
4	Australia	3	0	2	0	1	1	−0.680

Source: EspnCricinfo
- Advanced to knock-out stage

8 June 2013
10:30
Scorecard

England; 269/6 (50 overs)	v	Australia; 221/9 (50 overs)
Ian Bell 91 (115); Clint McKay 2/38 (10 overs)		George Bailey 55 (69); James Anderson 3/30 (10 overs)

England won by 48 runs
Edgbaston, Birmingham
Umpires: Kumar Dharmasena (SL) and Marais Erasmus (SA)
Player of the match: Ian Bell (Eng)

- England won the toss and elected to bat.
- Points: England 2, Australia 0.

9 June 2013
10:30
Scorecard

Sri Lanka; 138 (37.5 overs)	v	New Zealand; 139/9 (36.3 overs)
Kumar Sangakkara 68 (87); Mitchell McClenaghan 4/43 (8.5 overs)		Nathan McCullum 32 (42); Lasith Malinga 4/34 (10 overs)

New Zealand won by 1 wicket
Sophia Gardens, Cardiff
Umpires: Bruce Oxenford (Aus) and Rod Tucker (Aus)
Player of the match: Nathan McCullum (NZ)

- Sri Lanka won the toss and elected to bat.
- Points: New Zealand 2, Sri Lanka 0.

12 June 2013
10:30
Scorecard

Australia; 243/8 (50 overs)	v	New Zealand; 51/2 (15 overs)
Adam Voges 71 (76); Mitchell McClenaghan 4/65 (10 overs)		Kane Williamson 18* (37); Clint McKay 2/10 (4 overs)

No result
Edgbaston, Birmingham
Umpires: Kumar Dharmasena (SL) and Nigel Llong (Eng)

- Australia won the toss and elected to bat.
- Match abandoned due to rain.
- Points: Australia 1, New Zealand 1.

13 June 2013
13:00 (D/N)
Scorecard

England; 293/7 (50 overs)	v	Sri Lanka; 297/3 (47.1 overs)
Jonathan Trott 76 (87); Rangana Herath 2/46 (10 overs)		Kumar Sangakkara 134* (135); James Anderson 2/51 (10 overs)

Sri Lanka won by 7 wickets
The Oval, London
Umpires: Billy Bowden (NZ) and Aleem Dar (Pak)
Player of the match: Kumar Sangakkara (SL)

- Sri Lanka won the toss and elected to field.
- Points: Sri Lanka 2, England 0.

16 June 2013
10:30
Scorecard

England; 169 (23.3 overs)	v	New Zealand; 159/8 (24 overs)
Alastair Cook 64 (47); Kyle Mills 4/30 (4.3 overs)		Kane Williamson 67 (54); James Anderson 3/32 (5 overs)

England won by 10 runs
Sophia Gardens, Cardiff
Umpires: Rod Tucker (Aus) and Bruce Oxenford (Aus)
Player of the match: Alastair Cook (Eng)

- New Zealand won the toss and elected to field.
- Rain delayed start of play and reduced the match to 24 overs per side.
- Corey Anderson (NZ) made his ODI debut.
- Points: England 2, New Zealand 0
- As a result of this match, England qualified for the semi-finals.

17 June 2013
13:00 (D/N)
Scorecard

Sri Lanka; 253/8 (50 overs)	v	Australia; 233 (42.3 overs)
Mahela Jayawardene 84* (81); Mitchell Johnson 3/48 (10 overs)		Adam Voges 49 (62); Nuwan Kulasekara 3/42 (9 overs)

Sri Lanka won by 20 runs
The Oval, London
Umpires: Marais Erasmus (SA) and Tony Hill (NZ)
Player of the match: Mahela Jayawardene (SL)

- Australia won the toss and elected to field.
- Points: Sri Lanka 2, Australia 0.
- As a result of this match, Sri Lanka qualified for the semi-finals.

=== Group B ===
Pos	Team	Pld	W	L	T	NR	Pts	NRR
1	India	3	3	0	0	0	6	0.938
2	South Africa	3	1	1	1	0	3	0.325
3	West Indies	3	1	1	1	0	3	−0.075
4	Pakistan	3	0	3	0	0	0	−1.035

Source: EspnCricinfo
- Advanced to knock-out stage

6 June 2013
10:30
Scorecard

India; 331/7 (50 overs)	v	South Africa; 305 (50 overs)
Shikhar Dhawan 114 (94); Ryan McLaren 3/70 (10 overs)		Ryan McLaren 71* (61); Ravindra Jadeja 2/31 (9 overs)

India won by 26 runs
Sophia Gardens, Cardiff
Umpires: Ian Gould (Eng) and Bruce Oxenford (Aus)
Player of the match: Shikhar Dhawan (Ind)

- South Africa won the toss and elected to field.
- Points: India 2, South Africa 0.

7 June 2013
10:30
Scorecard

Pakistan; 170 (48 overs)	v	West Indies; 172/8 (40.4 overs)
Misbah-ul-Haq 96* (127); Kemar Roach 3/28 (10 overs)		Chris Gayle 39 (47); Mohammad Irfan 3/32 (9 overs)

West Indies won by 2 wickets
The Oval, London
Umpires: Steve Davis (Aus) and Nigel Llong (Eng)
Player of the match: Kemar Roach (WI)

- West Indies won the toss and elected to field.
- The West Indies innings was delayed by rain.
- Points: West Indies 2, Pakistan 0.

10 June 2013
13:00 (D/N)
Scorecard

South Africa; 234/9 (50 overs)	v	Pakistan; 167 (45 overs)
Hashim Amla 81 (97); Shoaib Malik 1/27 (6 overs)		Misbah-ul-Haq 55 (75); Ryan McLaren 4/19 (8 overs)

South Africa won by 67 runs
Edgbaston, Birmingham
Umpires: Billy Bowden (NZ) and Richard Kettleborough (Eng)
Player of the match: Hashim Amla (SA)

- South Africa won the toss and elected to bat.
- Chris Morris (SA) made his ODI debut.
- Points: South Africa 2, Pakistan 0.

11 June 2013
10:30
Scorecard

West Indies; 233/9 (50 overs)	v	India; 236/2 (39.1 overs)
Johnson Charles 60 (55); Ravindra Jadeja 5/36 (10 overs)		Shikhar Dhawan 102* (107); Sunil Narine 2/49 (10 overs)

India won by 8 wickets
The Oval, London
Umpires: Aleem Dar (Pak) and Tony Hill (NZ)
Player of the match: Ravindra Jadeja (Ind)

- India won the toss and elected to field.
- Points: India 2, West Indies 0.
- As a result of this match, India qualified for the semi-finals and Pakistan were eliminated.

14 June 2013
10:30
Scorecard

South Africa; 230/6 (31 overs)	v	West Indies; 190/6 (26.1 overs)
Colin Ingram 73 (63); Dwayne Bravo 2/43 (5 overs)		Marlon Samuels 48 (38); Dale Steyn 2/33 (6 overs)

Match tied (D/L method)
Sophia Gardens, Cardiff
Umpires: Steve Davis (Aus) and Rod Tucker (Aus)
Player of the match: Colin Ingram (SA)

- West Indies won the toss and elected to field.
- The match was reduced to 31 overs per side due to rain.
- West Indies innings curtailed at 26.1 overs due to rain; DLS par score was 191.
- Points: South Africa 1, West Indies 1.
- South Africa qualified for the semi-finals due to better net run rate and West Indies were eliminated.

15 June 2013
10:30
Scorecard

Pakistan; 165 (39.4 overs)	v	India; 102/2 (19.1 overs)
Asad Shafiq 41 (57); Bhuvneshwar Kumar 2/19 (8 overs)		Shikhar Dhawan 48 (41); Wahab Riaz 1/20 (4 overs)

India won by 8 wickets (D/L method)
Edgbaston, Birmingham
Umpires: Ian Gould (Eng) and Richard Kettleborough (Eng)
Player of the match: Bhuvneshwar Kumar (Ind)

- India won the toss and elected to field.
- Rain during Pakistan's innings reduced the match to 40 overs per side.
- Further rain reduced India's innings to 22 overs, with a revised target of 102.
- Points: India 2, Pakistan 0.

== Knockout stage ==
Semifinals
A1	England	179/3 (37.3 overs)
B2	South Africa	175 (38.4 overs)
B1	India	182/2 (35 overs)
A2	Sri Lanka	181/8 (50 overs)

Final
A1	England	124/8 (20 overs)
B1	India	129/7 (20 overs)

=== Semi-finals ===
19 June 2013
10:30
Scorecard

South Africa; 175 (38.4 overs)	v	England; 179/3 (37.3 overs)
David Miller 56* (51); James Tredwell 3/19 (7 overs)		Jonathan Trott 82* (84); Rory Kleinveldt 1/10 (4 overs)

England won by 7 wickets
The Oval, London
Umpires: Kumar Dharmasena (SL) and Rod Tucker (Aus)
Player of the match: James Tredwell (Eng)

- England won the toss and elected to field.

20 June 2013
10:30
Scorecard

Sri Lanka; 181/8 (50 overs)	v	India; 182/2 (35 overs)
Angelo Mathews 51 (89); Ishant Sharma 3/33 (9 overs)		Shikhar Dhawan 68 (92); Angelo Mathews 1/10 (4 overs)

India won by 8 wickets
Sophia Gardens, Cardiff
Umpires: Aleem Dar (Pak) and Richard Kettleborough (Eng)
Player of the match: Ishant Sharma (Ind)

- India won the toss and elected to field.

=== Final ===
23 June 2013
10:30
Scorecard

India; 129/7 (20 overs)	v	England; 124/8 (20 overs)
Virat Kohli 43 (34); Ravi Bopara 3/20 (4 overs)		Eoin Morgan 33 (30); Ravichandran Ashwin 2/15 (4 overs)

India won by 5 runs
Edgbaston, Birmingham
Umpires: Kumar Dharmasena (SL) and Rod Tucker (Aus)
Player of the match: Ravindra Jadeja (Ind)

- England won the toss and elected to field.
- The match was reduced to 20 overs per side due to rain.
- MS Dhoni (Ind) became the first captain to win T20 World Cup (2007), Cricket World Cup (2011) and ICC Champions Trophy (2013).

== Statistics ==
=== Batting ===
Most runs

Player	Mat	Inns	Runs	Ave	HS
(India) Shikhar Dhawan	5	5	363	90.75	114
(England) Jonathan Trott	5	5	229	57.25	82*
(Sri Lanka) Kumar Sangakkara	4	4	222	74.00	134*
(India) Rohit Sharma	5	5	177	35.40	65
(India) Virat Kohli	5	5	176	58.66	58*

=== Bowling ===
Most wickets

Player	Mat	Inns	Wkts	Ave	Econ	BBI
(India) Ravindra Jadeja	5	5	12	12.83	3.75	5/36
(New Zealand) Mitchell McClenaghan	3	3	11	13.09	6.04	4/43
(England) James Anderson	5	5	11	13.72	4.08	3/30
(India) Ishant Sharma	5	5	10	21.80	5.73	3/33
(South Africa) Ryan McLaren	4	4	8	18.50	5.44	4/19

=== Team of the Tournament ===
The team of the tournament was announced by ICC on 28 June 2013. It was selected by a five-person selection panel that comprised Geoff Allardice (ICC General Manager – Cricket, and Chairman Event Technical Committee), Javagal Srinath (former India fast bowler and ICC Emirates Elite Panel match referee), Aleem Dar (ICC Emirates Elite Panel umpire), Scyld Berry (Wisden Editor from 2008 to 2011 and Sunday Telegraph correspondent) and Stephen Brenkley (correspondent of The Independent and Independent On Sunday).

Team of the Tournament (in batting order):

- (India) Shikhar Dhawan
- (England) Jonathan Trott
- (Sri Lanka) Kumar Sangakkara
- (India) Virat Kohli
- (Pakistan) Misbah-ul-Haq
- (India) Mahendra Singh Dhoni (c & wk)
- (India) Ravindra Jadeja
- (South Africa) Ryan McLaren
- (India) Bhuvneshwar Kumar
- (England) James Anderson
- (New Zealand) Mitchell McClenaghan
- (England) Joe Root (12th man)

== Controversies ==
In the group stage match against Pakistan, West Indies' wicket-keeper Denesh Ramdin claimed the catch of Misbah-ul-Haq, however in the replays it was shown that he had actually dropped it. Later, Ramdin was found guilty of conduct contrary to the spirit of the game. He was fined 100% of his match fees and got suspended for two ODIs.

David Warner was suspended by Cricket Australia until the first Ashes Test after an altercation with English batsman Joe Root following Australia's loss to England.

Former England captain Bob Willis accused one English cricketer of tampering with the ball in order to aid reverse swing during their match against Sri Lanka. Umpire Aleem Dar changed the ball midway through Sri Lanka's innings, but England coach Ashley Giles denied the accusations, saying that Dar changed the ball because it had gone out of shape.

=== Pitch invasion incident ===
The semi-final between India and Sri Lanka at Sophia Gardens in Cardiff saw individuals, possibly Tamil Youth activists, running onto the pitch with flags of Tamil Eelam and banners protesting against the Sri Lankan team playing in the United Kingdom. The first invasion occurred in the 50th over of the Sri Lanka innings, but the two interlopers were soon overpowered by the security staff. However, the second invasion saw at least six protesters run onto the field from various angles from the River Taff End of the ground.

The protests continued after the match had finished, and a fight broke out outside the ground between protesters and supporters in a manner similar to the earlier protests at a group stage game at The Oval. Later, hundreds of members of Britain's Tamil community held up the Sri Lankan team bus after the encounter and raised anti-Sri Lankan government slogans. No protests were shown to the Indian team and their bus left as scheduled.
