= South Australian Cricket Umpires and Scorers Association =

The South Australian Cricket Umpires and Scorers Association ("SACUSA") is a group representing cricket umpires and scorers in the state of South Australia.

== Current status ==
The SACUSA is an affiliate of the South Australian Cricket Association ("SACA") and represents umpires throughout the state.

== History ==
In 2011 it was discovered that the Association was founded in November 1911 by SACA Grade Cricket Umpires, Fred Thomas and Fred Adams, among others. The 2011/12 cricket season publicly celebrated its centenary with a 'Centenary Round' of SACA grade cricket, an historic photo of past and present umpires in front of the Adelaide Oval scoreboard (which also celebrated its centenary in 2011), a revival of the Association President's XI vs Vice-President's XI cricket match and a Centenary Dinner. Notable past members of the Association include Test Cricket umpires, Philip Argall and George Hele (who also umpired during the Bodyline series).

== Notable members ==
2015 retired ICC Elite Umpire Panel member from the ranks of SACUSA is 2004 Life Member Steve Davis.

Cricket Australia Umpire High Performance Panel member and also 1994 SACUSA Life Member is Daryl Harper.

Fellow SACUSA member, Simon Fry, is presently a member of the ICC International Panel of Umpires and Referees and Cricket Australia's National Umpiring Panel (NUP) respectively.

== Awards ==
The SACUSA has an annual awards ceremony that acknowledges high achieving umpires with such awards as the Umpire of the Year, Best under 21 umpire and most improved.

The Bradman Medal, awarded to the best player in the South Australian Grade Cricket League, is presented by the SACUSA. The award was conceived by members of the SACUSA in the late 1950s and was first awarded in the 1958 – 1959 season.
