= Mark Benson =

English cricketer and umpire

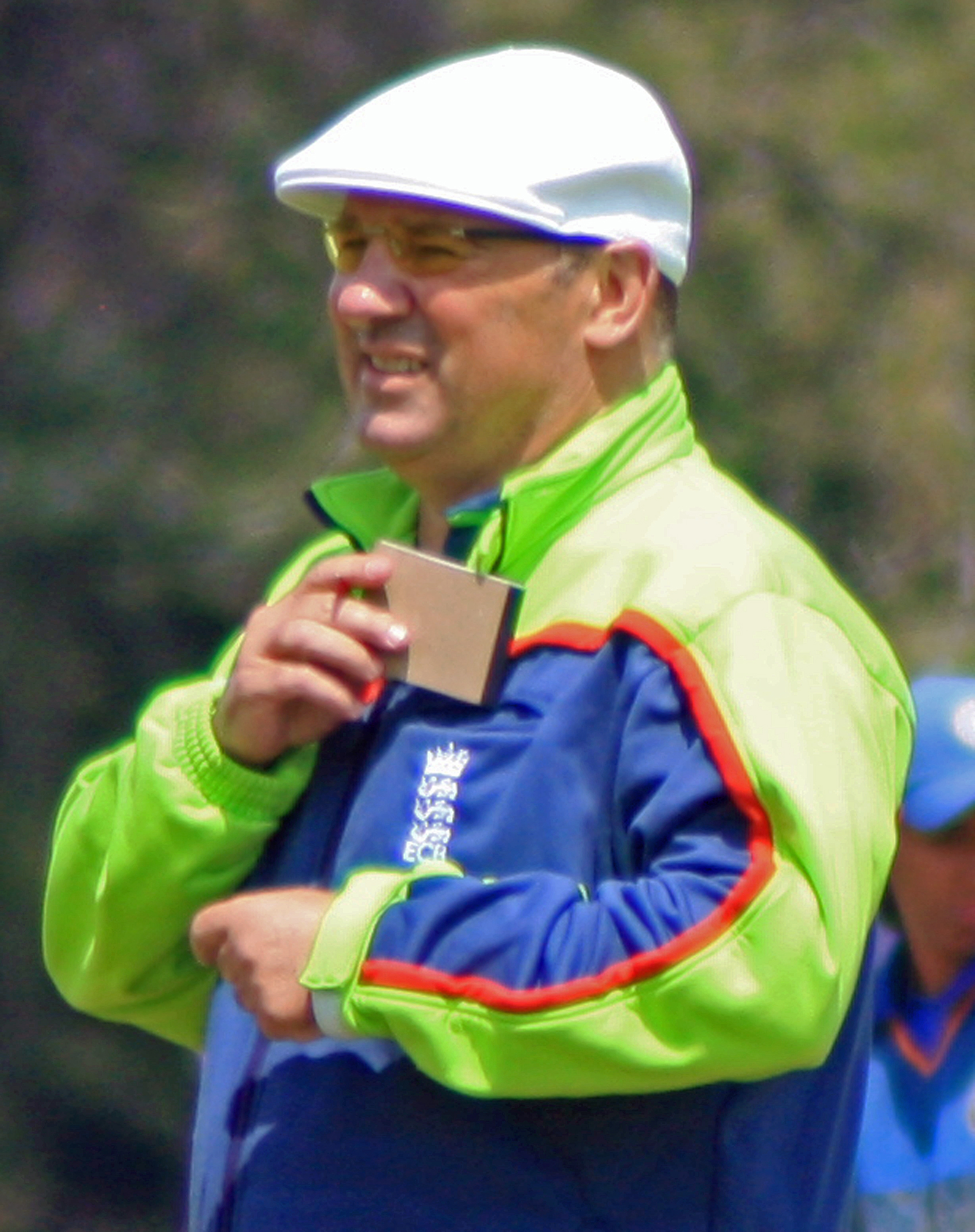

Personal information
- Full name: Mark Richard Benson
- Born: 6 July 1958 (age 68); Shoreham-by-Sea, Sussex, England
- Nickname: Benny
- Height: 5 ft 9 in (1.75 m)
- Batting: Left-handed
- Bowling: Right-arm off-spin
- Role: Batsman, Umpire

International information
- National side: England
- Only Test (cap 518): 3 July 1986 v India
- Only ODI (cap 89): 16 July 1986 v New Zealand

Domestic team information
- Years: Team
- 1980–1995: Kent

Umpiring information
- Tests umpired: 27 (2004–2009)
- ODIs umpired: 72 (2004–2009)
- T20Is umpired: 19 (2007–2009)
- WTests umpired: 2 (2003–2013)
- WODIs umpired: 4 (2009–2014)
- WT20Is umpired: 1 (2009)

Career statistics
| Competition | Tests | ODI | FC | LA |
|---|---|---|---|---|
| Matches | 1 | 1 | 292 | 269 |
| Runs scored | 51 | 24 | 18,387 | 7,838 |
| Batting average | 25.50 | 24.00 | 40.23 | 31.86 |
| 100s/50s | 0/0 | 0/0 | 48/99 | 5/53 |
| Top score | 30 | 24 | 257 | 119 |
| Balls bowled | 0 | 0 | 467 | 0 |
| Wickets | – | – | 5 | – |
| Bowling average | – | – | 98.60 | – |
| 5 wickets in innings | – | – | 0 | – |
| 10 wickets in match | – | – | 0 | – |
| Best bowling | – | – | 2/55 | – |
| Catches/stumpings | 0/– | 0/– | 140/– | 68/– |
- Source: CricInfo, 6 February 2010

Mark Richard Benson (born 6 July 1958) is an English former cricketer and umpire. A left-handed batsman, Benson played for Kent for 17 years and represented England in one Test match and one One Day International in 1986. He later took up umpiring and was on the Elite Panel of ICC Umpires. In January 2016 he retired as an umpire.

== Early life ==
Benson was born in Shoreham-by-Sea, West Sussex, England. Benson's father Frank had played cricket for Ghana. The family settled in Kent and Mark was educated at Sutton Valence school, and worked for a time as a marketing assistant for Shell. He was a late starter in cricket, not taking up the game until the age of but he took up full-time cricket with Kent, "with a fine reputation for facing fast bowling" from his school days.

== Domestic playing career ==
Benson made his first-class debut as a left-handed opening batsman in 1980 and was virtually an "ever-present" in the Kent side for the next fifteen seasons scoring over 18,000 runs (48 centuries) for the county. He was Kent's third highest aggregate run scorer in the post-war era and his batting average of 40.27 was the fourth highest for a major batsman in Kent's history (after Les Ames, Frank Woolley and Colin Cowdrey). He scored 1,000 runs in a season 12 times, with a best of 1,725 runs (average 44.23) in 1987. Benson played 268 One Day matches (5 centuries, 53 fifties, 6 "man of the match" awards) for Kent scoring 7814 runs at an average of 31.89. These included a man of the match-winning century as Kent won a NatWest Trophy semi final in 1984, although they lost in the final to Middlesex.

For the 1991 Benson was appointed captain of Kent and on his first day as captain he scored a career best 257 against Hampshire. Under his captaincy Kent were runners-up in the County Championship in 1992, Sunday League champions in 1995 (runners up in 1993) and Benson & Hedges Cup finalists in 1992 and 1995. At the end of the 1995 season Benson was forced to retire due to a knee injury.

Overall, Benson scored a century every 10.23 innings, the third highest rate for Kent, including a century in each innings v Warwickshire in 1993. Benson and Neil Taylor scored the highest opening partnership (300) for Kent v Derbyshire in 1991. Brian Luckhurst named Benson as Kent's greatest post war opening batsmen and referred to him as "His generation's unsung hero."

== International playing career ==
In 1986 Benson played one Test Match for England against India and one ODI against New Zealand. He was initially called up as a replacement after an injury to Wayne Larkins. He was plunged into a crisis at the start of his only Test match, being at the wicket as England lost two wickets without a run on the board, but helped England to a draw, ending a run of seven successive Test defeats.

In 1993, Benson captained an England XI in two limited-over matches against the Netherlands, top-scoring for his side in both matches with 61 and 58, his team winning the first match, and losing the second. These matches however were not accredited one-day internationals.

Huw Turbervill, editor of The Cricketer, wrote that he interviewed Benson, thinking that he had been harshly treated by the England selectors. "Had he been badly treated, I asked him? “God no!” he told me. “There were some good openers about. Graham Gooch ... Chris Broad, Tim Robinson, Wayne Larkins, Martyn Moxon, Graeme Fowler, Kim Barnett and Gehan Mendis.” I was taken aback by what I perceived to be his lack of ambition ... But then I figured... Raised in Lagos, Ghana, Benson did not start playing cricket until he was 12/13. To then go on and represent his country (not to mention being a fantastic performer for Kent ... was a phenomenal achievement."

== Umpiring career ==
After retiring as a cricketer, Benson became an umpire, making his first-class umpiring debut in 1997 and standing in international matches for the first time in 2004. He stood in eight matches in the 2007 Cricket World Cup. In September 2007, he was nominated for the ICC Umpire of the Year Award after just one full season on the panel.

In April 2006, having stood in eight Tests and twenty-four one-day internationals, Benson became one of three umpires promoted from the Emirates International Panel of Umpires to the Emirates Elite Panel of Umpires. He also stood in the 2007 World Twenty 20 final in Johannesburg, South Africa.

Whilst umpiring the second Test between South Africa and India at Durban on 28 December 2006 Benson had to leave the field, after suffering from heart palpitations.

In the Sydney Test between Australia and India in January 2008, Benson umpired alongside Steve Bucknor in a match that featured contentious umpiring and allegations of poor player behaviour. Many of the controversial umpiring decisions in the match were reported to have gone against the Indians. India's team manager "said his players were "agitated and upset" [by the] "incompetent umpires here"... [and hoped] "that they will not officiate again in the series."

Later in 2008, Benson made history in the 1st Test in Sri Lanka, being the first umpire to be asked to refer a decision. When Tillakaratne Dilshan asked for the umpire Mark Benson's decision to give him out caught behind to be reviewed, the English official changed his verdict when the television replay umpire Rudi Koertzen could not say conclusively that the ball had hit his bat or the ground on the way through to the Indian wicketkeeper.

Benson withdrew in the middle of the second Test match in November 2009 between Australia and the West Indies, amid speculation that he was upset with the referral system when one of his decisions was overturned. The ICC denied this, saying that Benson was ill.

On 5 February 2010 it was announced that Benson was retiring from international cricket umpiring, but would continue to umpire domestic cricket in England. In January 2016 he retired as an umpire, having suffered a back injury that required surgery.

== See also ==
- One Test Wonder
- List of Test cricket umpires
- List of One Day International cricket umpires
- List of Twenty20 International cricket umpires

Sporting positions
| Preceded by Chris Cowdrey | Kent County Cricket Club captain 1991–1996 | Succeeded by Steve Marsh |
