= Jeff Crowe =

New Zealand cricketer

Personal information
- Full name: Jeffrey John Crowe
- Born: 14 September 1958 (age 68); Auckland, New Zealand
- Batting: Right-handed
- Bowling: Right arm medium
- Relatives: Dave Crowe (father); Martin Crowe (brother); Russell Crowe (cousin); Francis Jervis (great-grandfather)

International information
- National side: New Zealand (1983–1990)
- Test debut (cap 151): 4 March 1983 v Sri Lanka
- Last Test: 19 March 1990 v Australia
- ODI debut (cap 42): 9 January 1983 v Australia
- Last ODI: 11 March 1990 v Australia

Domestic team information
- Years: Team
- 1977/78–1981/82: South Australia
- 1982/83–1991/92: Auckland

Career statistics
Competition	Test	ODI	FC	LA
Matches	39	75	180	139
Runs scored	1,601	1,518	10,233	2,974
Batting average	26.24	25.72	37.90	26.31
100s/50s	3/6	0/7	22/56	1/14
Top score	128	88*	159	130*
Balls bowled	18	6	100	6
Wickets	0	0	1	0
Bowling average	–	–	55.00	–
5 wickets in innings	–	–	0	–
10 wickets in match	–	–	0	–
Best bowling	–	–	1/10	–
Catches/stumpings	41/–	28/–	199/–	56/–
- Source: Cricinfo, 4 November 2016

Jeffrey John Crowe (born 14 September 1958) is a former New Zealand cricketer. He played Test and One Day International cricket for New Zealand from 1983 to 1990, and first-class cricket for South Australia and then Auckland.

He has been an ICC match referee since 2004.

== Early and personal life ==
Crowe was born in Auckland, New Zealand. He is the son of Dave Crowe, and the elder brother of Martin Crowe. The Crowe brothers are cousins of Oscar-winning actor Russell Crowe, whose father John Alexander Crowe is the brother of Dave Crowe; their grandfather John Doubleday Crowe, emigrated to New Zealand from Wrexham in Wales. He is also the great-grandson of All Black Francis Jervis (his mother's maternal grandfather).

Crowe's father played in three first-class cricket matches for Canterbury and Wellington between 1953 and 1957.

== Domestic career ==
Crowe began his first-class cricket career at South Australia, where he played from 1977–78 to 1981–82. There was a suggestion that he could play for the Australian cricket team, but he returned to New Zealand in 1982–83 to play for Auckland, with the hope of playing for New Zealand instead. He worked on his fielding, and also occasionally kept wicket.

After a benefit season at Auckland in 1990–91, and one more domestic season, he retired from playing professional cricket at the end of the 1991–92 season.

== International career ==
He was born just over 4 years before his younger brother Martin, but he made his Test debut for New Zealand in the First Test against Sri Lanka at Christchurch in March 1983, just over a year after his brother. He scored his maiden Test century (128) in the Third Test against England in Auckland in February 1984.

Playing against the dominant West Indies team in 1984–85, his team was following on 225 runs in arrears in the Fourth Test at Sabina Park in Kingston, Jamaica, in May 1985. Crowe went in at number 3 in the second innings, with the score at 1–13. Against a fierce fast bowling attack that included Courtney Walsh, Malcolm Marshall and Joel Garner, he scored his second Test century (112); but despite his heroics, New Zealand still lost by 10 wickets.

He was captain of the New Zealand cricket team for six Tests – a one-off Test against Sri Lanka at Colombo in April 1987 (when he scored the third and last of his Test centuries, 120 not out in a drawn match) and then three on tour to Australia in December 1987, and finally two at home against England in February 1988. One of the matches against Australia was lost, and the other five were drawn. Crowe played his last Test against Australia at Wellington in March 1990. He also played in 75 ODIs from 1983 to 1990, including the Cricket World Cups in England in 1983 and in India in 1987.

== After cricket ==
Crowe was manager of the New Zealand cricket team from 1999 to 2003. He ran a golfing holiday business in Florida for a period, and since 2004 he has been an ICC match referee, including the World Cup finals in 2007 and 2011. He is one of four people to have been referee in more than 100 Tests (the others are Chris Broad, Ranjan Madugalle and Andy Pycroft) and one of three to have been referee in more than 300 ODIs (the others are Broad and Madugalle). In January 2017 he refereed his 250th ODI match, when he officiated the fifth ODI between Australia and Pakistan at the Adelaide Oval.

== See also ==
- Elite Panel of ICC Referees

Sporting positions
Preceded by Jeremy Coney	New Zealand national cricket captain 1986/7–1987/8	Succeeded by John Wright
