= Elite Panel of ICC Referees =

The Emirates Elite Panel of ICC Referees is composed of former international cricket players who are appointed by the ICC to oversee all Test match, One Day International and Twenty20 International cricket matches in the capacity of Match referee. The referees are ultimately in charge of all international cricket matches, and act as the ICC's representative at the grounds. In addition they are responsible for imposing penalties for infringements of the ICC Code of Conduct, and so being ex-international cricketers they can ensure that the punishments dealt out are just. The referees also form part of the ICC's umpire performance review, submitting reports about the umpires after each match.

== Current members ==
As of 15 November 2026 the ICC Elite Panel consists of:

Referee	Date of birth	Age	Tests	ODIs	T20Is	Country
Ranjan Madugalle	22 April 1959	67 years, 207 days	235	426	198	Sri Lanka
Jeff Crowe	14 September 1958	68 years, 62 days	137	357	215	New Zealand
Javagal Srinath	31 August 1969	57 years, 76 days	91	291	155	India
Andy Pycroft	6 June 1956	70 years, 162 days	113	254	214	Zimbabwe
Richie Richardson	12 January 1962	64 years, 307 days	63	116	144	(Cricket West Indies) West Indies

== Past members ==
The following people were included in the inaugural panel of elite referees but have since retired:

Referee	Date of birth	Joined Panel	Left Panel	Tests	ODIs	T20Is	Country
Gundappa Viswanath	12 February 1949	2002	2004	15	80	0	India
Wasim Raja	3 July 1952	2002	2004	15	35	0	Pakistan
Clive Lloyd	31 August 1944	2002	2007	53	133	2	(Cricket West Indies) West Indies
Mike Procter	15 September 1946	2002	2008	47	162	15	South Africa
Alan Hurst	15 July 1950	2004	2011	45	102	26	Australia
Roshan Mahanama	31 May 1966	2004	2015	61	222	36	Sri Lanka
Chris Broad	29 September 1957	2003	2024	123	361	138	England
David Boon	29 December 1960	2011	2025	87	183	119	Australia

== Controversies ==
=== 2006 ball-tampering controversy ===
Mike Procter was criticised for failing to persuade umpires Darrell Hair and Billy Doctrove to continue with the match, which was awarded to England when Pakistan refused to take the field in protest at being accused of ball tampering.

=== 2007 Cricket World Cup Final ===
Jeff Crowe was seen as ultimately responsible for the failure of the five match officials (himself and umpires Bucknor, Dar, Koertzen and Bowden) to adhere to the ICC's playing conditions regarding to the number of overs required before Duckworth-Lewis can determine the outcome of a match.

This resulted in Australia and Sri Lanka having to play out three overs in near darkness, since they had been told they would otherwise have to return and play out the overs the following day. In the aftermath of this fiasco, Crowe apologised on behalf of the playing control team for the error.

== Records ==
=== Tests ===
Most Test matches as a referee as of 31 October 2026:

Referee	Period	Matches
(Sri Lanka) Ranjan Madugalle	1993–present	235
(New Zealand) Jeff Crowe	2004–present	137
(England) Chris Broad	2003–2024	123
(Zimbabwe) Andy Pycroft	2009–present	113
(India) Javagal Srinath	2006–present	91

=== ODIs ===
Most ODI matches as a referee as of 15 November 2026:

Referee	Period	Matches
(Sri Lanka) Ranjan Madugalle	1993–present	426
(England) Chris Broad	2004–2024	361
(New Zealand) Jeff Crowe	2004–present	357
(India) Javagal Srinath	2006–present	291
(Zimbabwe) Andy Pycroft	2009–present	254

=== T20Is ===
Most T20I matches as a referee as of 15 November 2026:

Referee	Period	Matches
(New Zealand) Jeff Crowe	2005–present	215
(Zimbabwe) Andy Pycroft	2009–present	214
(Sri Lanka) Ranjan Madugalle	2006–present	198
(India) Javagal Srinath	2006–present	155
(Cricket West Indies) Richie Richardson	2015–present	144

== See also ==
- Umpire (cricket)
- Elite Panel of ICC Umpires
- International Panel of ICC Umpires
