= Kantilal Kanjee =

Kantilal Kanjee (22 April 1944 – February 2011) was a Zimbabwean first-class and Test cricket umpire.

Kanjee was born in Salisbury (now Harare) and was of Indian descent. He umpired first-class matches in Rhodesia (now Zimbabwe) from 1972. At the time, Rhodesian teams took part in the South African domestic first-class competition, the Currie Cup. Kanjee became the first non-white umpire to stand in a first-class match in South Africa in January 1975, when Western Province played Transvaal at Newlands, Cape Town, in the 1974/75 Currie Cup.

He umpired in four Test matches from 1992 to 1994, all played in Zimbabwe. He made his debut as a Test umpire in Zimbabwe's inaugural Test, the one-off Test against India in Harare in October 1992. Kanjee also stood in the two back-to-back Tests against New Zealand the following month. An experimental umpiring system was used in these three Tests, in which Dickie Bird umpired from one end, and Kanjee shared the umpiring duties at the other end, swapping each day with a second senior Zimbabwean umpire, Ian Robinson. In another experiment, the 2nd Test against New Zealand was interrupted by a One-day International held on 8 November 1992, between the first and second days of the Test. These experiments were not a success and were not repeated. Kanjee was included in the ICC's first original panel of International Panel of Umpires and Referees in 1994, and umpired his last Test in October 1994, the 3rd Test between Zimbabwe and Sri Lanka in Harare.

He also umpired in ten One-day Internationals between 1992 and 1994, four in Zimbabwe and six in the Pepsi Austral-Asia Cup in Sharjah in 1994. He continued to umpire first-class and List A matches until 1999.

== See also ==
- List of Test cricket umpires
- List of One Day International cricket umpires
