= Rudi Koertzen =

South African cricket umpire (1939–2022)

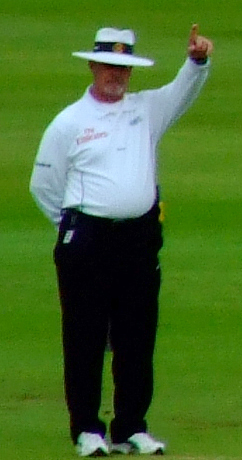
- Koertzen at the 3rd Test of the 2009 Ashes series at Edgbaston

Personal information
- Full name: Rudolf Eric Koertzen
- Born: 26 March 1949; Knysna, Cape Province, South Africa
- Died: 9 August 2022 (aged 73) near Riversdale, Western Cape, South Africa
- Nickname: Rudi
- Role: Umpire

Umpiring information
- Tests umpired: 108 (1992–2010)
- ODIs umpired: 209 (1992–2010)
- T20Is umpired: 14 (2007–2010)
- WT20Is umpired: 1 (2009)
- Source: ESPNcricinfo, 4 June 2010

Rudolf Eric Koertzen (/ˈkɜːrtsən/; 26 March 1949 – 9 August 2022) was a South African international cricket umpire and former cricketer. A cricket enthusiast since his youth, he played league cricket while working as a clerk for South African Railways. He began umpiring in 1981, before becoming a full-time official eleven years later. In an international career spanning 18 years, he officiated in a record 331 matches and is only behind Aleem Dar in officiating as an umpire in most international matches.

== Early life ==
Koertzen was born in Knysna, Cape Province, Union of South Africa, on 26 March 1949. A medium pace bowler, he played for a top-level cricket club in Kimberley. He worked as a railway clerk in Port Elizabeth, before being employed in the construction industry. He started umpiring in 1981, before becoming a full-time umpire in 1992, when he was 43 years old.

== Umpiring career ==
Koertzen officiated in his first One Day International (ODI) on 9 December 1992, and in his first Test match later the same month. Both matches were contested between South Africa and India at Port Elizabeth, in the first series in which television replays were used to assist with run out decisions. Koertzen soon became well known for his manner of giving batters out. Due to the slow raising of his index finger, he became known as the "slow finger of death". This nickname originated from Daryll Cullinan, the South Africa batsman, who once asked Koertzen: “Why do you make me suffer and wait for that slow death decision?”

Koertzen became a full-time International Cricket Council (ICC) umpire in 1997, and was one of the original members of the Elite Panel of ICC Umpires when it was founded in 2002. He went on to officiate in a record 209 ODIs – becoming the second umpire (after David Shepherd) to stand in 150 ODIs with the match between India and Pakistan at Abu Dhabi on 19 April 2006; he later surpassed Shepherd's record of 172 ODIs at the 2007 Cricket World Cup with the match between the West Indies and England in Barbados on 21 April 2007. His 200th ODI was the match between Ireland and Kenya at Dublin on 11 July 2009. He also became the second umpire, after Steve Bucknor, to stand in 100 Test matches with the second Test of the 2009 Ashes between England and Australia at Lord's on 16 July 2009, and eventually officiated in 108 Tests.

Throughout his career, Koertzen was appointed to several high-profile matches, including Ashes series (he was one of the umpires during the famous 2005 Ashes) and series between India and Pakistan. In both the 2003 and 2007 Cricket World Cups, he officiated on-field in one of the semi-finals and was the third umpire in the final. He was also one of the on-field umpires for the final of the ICC Champions Trophy in both 2004 and 2006, and was selected to umpire in the ICC Super Series (Australia v World XI) in 2005, along with Simon Taufel, Aleem Dar and Darrell Hair.

Koertzen's professionalism saw him through some controversial moments: in September 1999, he refused a bribe to fix the outcome of the final of the Singapore Challenge between the West Indies and India, and in January 2000, he stood in the Test match between South Africa and England at Centurion, where both teams forfeited an innings in order to force a result after South African captain Hansie Cronje had been approached by a bookmaker. He was highly regarded by the players: he was voted the top umpire in 2002, and was nominated for the ICC Umpire of the Year award in 2005 and 2006, on both occasions finishing third behind Taufel and Aleem Dar. However, he also made a number of high-profile errors, most notably in the ill-tempered Test between Sri Lanka and England at Kandy in March 2001, and in the final of the 2007 World Cup, where his misinterpretation of the rules regarding bad light resulted in him being banned from officiating in the inaugural ICC World Twenty20 tournament later that year (though he was selected for the following World Twenty20 tournament, in 2009).

On 4 June 2010, Koertzen announced that he would be retiring from umpiring after the Test series between Australia and Pakistan in England that summer. His final ODI was between Zimbabwe and Sri Lanka at Harare on 9 June 2010, and his final Test was between Pakistan and Australia at Leeds on 21–24 July 2010. He was part of ICC's elite panel of umpires for a duration of eight years from 2002 to 2010 and by the time when he retired, he held the world record for having officiated in most international matches as an umpire.

== Post international umpiring ==
Following his international retirement in 2010, he published a book titled Slow Death: Memoirs of a Cricket Umpire in which he specifically addressed the shortcomings during the 2007 Cricket World Cup final which had one of the farcical tense finishes in history. His last representative match as an umpire came during the 2011 Indian Premier League between Royal Challengers Bangalore and Chennai Super Kings.

== Death ==
Koertzen died in a car accident near Riversdale, Western Cape, on 9 August 2022; while driving back from a golfing weekend in Cape Town to his family home in Despatch, Eastern Cape, the car he was travelling in was involved in a head-on collision that also killed three other people. He was 73 years old.

== Awards ==
- ICC Bronze Bails Award for 100 ODIs
- ICC Silver Bails Award for 200 ODIs
- ICC Golden Bails Award for 100 Tests

Koertzen was the first umpire to earn all three of these awards. This feat has since only been achieved by Aleem Dar.

== See also ==
- List of One Day International cricket umpires
- List of Test cricket umpires
- List of Twenty20 International cricket umpires
