= International Panel of ICC Umpires =

Cricket umpires

The International Panel of ICC Umpires was established by the ICC in 1994 following trial in 1992/3, to ensure that one neutral umpire would stand in every Test match. It is made up of officials nominated from each of the twelve Test playing cricket boards. From 2002, its role in Tests was largely supplanted by the Elite Panel of ICC Umpires.

Umpires from the International Panel are employed to officiate home One Day international matches, but may also be called upon to aid the Elite Panel in Test matches and overseas ODIs during busy cricketing calendar years.

== Panel ==
As of 29 December 2025, the ICC International Panel consisted of:

| Country | Selected Umpires Panel |
|---|---|
| Afghanistan | Ahmad Shah Pakteen, Ahmad Shah Durrani, Izatullah Safi |
| Australia | Donovan Koch, **Sam Nogajski**, Phillip Gillespie, Shawn Craig |
| Australia | Ashlee Gibbons, **Claire Polosak**, **Eloise Sheridan**, Lisa McCabe |
| Bangladesh | Masudur Rahman, Gazi Sohel, Tanvir Ahmed, Morshed Ali Khan |
| Bangladesh | Champa Chakma, Dolly Rani, Rokeya Sultana, Shathira Jakir |
| England | Russell Warren, Martin Saggers, Mike Burns, Graham Lloyd |
| England | **Anna Harris**, **Sue Redfern** |
| India | **Jayaraman Madanagopal**, Rohan Pandit, Virender Sharma, K. N. Ananthapadmanabhan |
| India | **Vrinda Rathi**, Narayanan Janani, Gayathri Venugopalan, Ankita Guha |
| Ireland | Johnny Kennedy, Mark Hawthorne, Roland Black, Aidan Seaver |
| New Zealand | Wayne Knights, **Chris Brown**, Shaun Haig, Cory Black |
| New Zealand | **Kim Cotton**, Tina Semmens |
| Pakistan | Aleem Dar, Faisal Afridi, **Asif Yaqoob**, Rashid Riaz |
| Pakistan | Saleema Imtiaz |
| South Africa | Lubabalo Gcuma, Stephen Harris, Arno Jacobs |
| South Africa | **Lauren Agenbag**, Kerrin Klaaste |
| Sri Lanka | Prageeth Rambukwella, Ruchira Palliyaguruge, Raveendra Wimalasiri, Lyndon Hannibal |
| Sri Lanka | **Nimali Perera**, Dedunu Silva |
| (Cricket West Indies) West Indies | Gregory Brathwaite, Nigel Duguid, Deighton Butler, Zahid Bassarath |
| (Cricket West Indies) West Indies | Candace la Borde, **Jacqueline Williams**, Maria Abbott |
| Zimbabwe | Langton Rusere, Iknow Chabi, Percival Sizara, Forster Mutizwa |
| Zimbabwe | Sarah Dambanevana |

- Members denoted in **bold** belong to the ICC Emerging Umpires group, who will be prioritised for ICC appointments akin to those of Elite Panel members (Test matches and full members ODIs)

== Former members ==
The following umpires were the member of the International Panel.

| Country | Members |
|---|---|
| Australia | Darrel Hair†, Steve Randell, Steve Davis†, Peter Parker, Simon Taufel†, Mick Martell, Paul Wilson, Bruce Oxenford†, Simon Fry, Gerard Abood, Shawn Craig, Bob Parry, Paul Reiffel†, Rod Tucker†, Daryl Harper† |
| Bangladesh | A. F. M. Akhtaruddin, Anisur Rahman, Enamul Haque Moni, Jahangir Alam, Mahbubur Rahman, Mesbahuddin Ahmed, Nadir Shah, Sailab Hossain, Showkatur Rahman, Syed Mahabubullah, Sharfuddoula† |
| England | Rob Bailey, Dickie Bird, Peter Hartley, Jeremy Lloyds, Neil Mallender, David Millns, Ken Palmer, Nigel Plews, Tim Robinson, David Shepherd, Alex Wharf† |
| India | VK Ramaswamy, Srinivasaraghavan Venkataraghavan, Sundaram Ravi†, C. Shamsuddin, Vineet Kulkarni, Anil Chaudhary |
| Ireland | Alan Neill, Richard Smith, Paul Reynolds |
| New Zealand | Brian Aldridge, Steve Dunne |
| Pakistan | Khizer Hayat, Mahboob Shah |
| South Africa | Barry Lambson, Karl Liebenberg, Allahudien Paleker† |
| Sri Lanka | B. C. Cooray, K. T. Francis |
| (Cricket West Indies) West Indies | Lloyd Barker, Steve Bucknor†, Patrick Gustard, Nigel Duguid |
| Zimbabwe | Ahmed Esat, Charles Coventry, Graeme Evans, Jeremiah Matibiri, Nigel Fleming, Owen Chirombe, Kantilal Kanjee, Ian Robinson, Quintin Goosen, Russell Tiffin†, Christopher Phiri |

- †: Later elevated to the Elite Panel from the International Panel

=== Original panel ===
The original members of the International Panel in 1994 were:

| Country | Members |
|---|---|
| Australia | Darrel Hair, Steve Randell |
| England | Dickie Bird, Ken Palmer, Nigel Plews, David Shepherd |
| India | VK Ramaswamy, Srinivasaraghavan Venkataraghavan |
| New Zealand | Brian Aldridge, Steve Dunne |
| Pakistan | Khizer Hayat, Mahboob Shah |
| South Africa | Barry Lambson, Karl Liebenberg |
| Sri Lanka | B. C. Cooray, K. T. Francis |
| (Cricket West Indies) West Indies | Lloyd Barker, Steve Bucknor |
| Zimbabwe | Kantilal Kanjee, Ian Robinson |

== See also ==
- Umpire (cricket)
- Elite Panel of ICC Umpires
- Elite Panel of ICC Referees
- List of Test umpires
