= Asad Rauf =

Pakistani cricketer and umpire (1956–2022)

Asad Rauf اسدرؤف
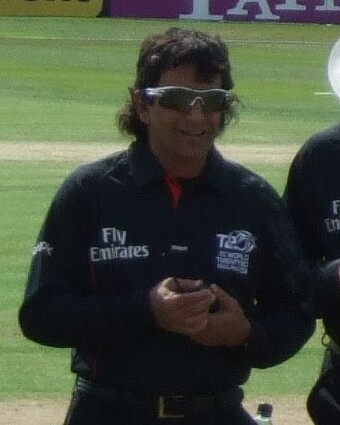
- Rauf in 2009

Personal information
- Born: 12 May 1956; Lahore, Punjab, Pakistan
- Died: 15 September 2022 (aged 66); Lahore, Punjab, Pakistan
- Batting: Right-handed
- Bowling: Right-arm off-spin
- Role: Batsman, umpire

Domestic team information
- Years: Team
- 1983–91: National Bank of Pakistan
- 1983–84: Lahore
- 1981–83: Pakistan Railways
- 1977–78: Pakistan Universities
- First-class debut: 4 November 1977; Pakistan Universities v Habib Bank Ltd
- Last First-class: 28 October 1990; National Bank of Pakistan v Pakistan National Shipping Corporation
- List A debut: 17 March 1981; Pakistan Railways v House Building Finance Corporation
- Last List A: 2 October 1991; National Bank of Pakistan v Pakistan National Shipping Corporation

Umpiring information
- Tests umpired: 49 (2005–2013)
- ODIs umpired: 98 (2000–2013)
- T20Is umpired: 23 (2007–2013)
- WT20Is umpired: 8 (2009–2010)

Career statistics
Competition	FC	LA
Matches	71	40
Runs scored	3423	611
Batting average	28.76	19.70
100s/50s	3/22	0/4
Top score	130	66
Balls bowled	722	478
Wickets	3	9
Bowling average	149.33	42.22
5 wickets in innings	0	0
10 wickets in match	0	n/a
Best bowling	1/3	2/18
Catches/stumpings	29/–	16/–
- Source: CricketArchive, 4 June 2010

Asad Rauf (Punjabi, Urdu: اسدرؤف; 12 May 1956 – 14 September 2022) was a Pakistani umpire and retired first-class cricketer. He was a member of the ICC Elite Umpire Panel from 2006 to 2013. Accused of involvement in match-fixing and spot-fixing of cricket matches, he was found guilty of corruption by the Board of Control for Cricket in India in February 2016 and banned for five years.

== Early life and playing career ==
Rauf was born in Lahore, Punjab, on 12 May 1956. He played in Pakistani domestic circuit between 1977 and 1991, representing Pakistan Universities, Lahore, National Bank of Pakistan and Pakistan Railways.

== Umpiring career ==
Rauf became a first-class umpire in 1998. In February 2000, the Pakistan Cricket Board appointed him to his first One Day International (ODI), the match between Pakistan and Sri Lanka at Gujranwala, Pakistan, on 16 February. With the promotion of Aleem Dar to the ICC Elite Umpire Panel three years later, Rauf was included in the International Panel of Umpires for the first time. In January 2005, the ICC appointed him to his first Test match, the fixture between Bangladesh and Zimbabwe at Chittagong (MAA). He then stood in the Boxing Day Test at the Melbourne Cricket Ground between Australia and South Africa in December that year. He was subsequently promoted to the Emirates Elite Panel of ICC Umpires in April the following year. In September 2012, Rauf umpired in the ICC World Twenty20 group stage match between India and Afghanistan.

From the time of his inclusion in the Elite Panel of ICC Umpires in 2006, Rauf umpired in 64 Tests, 139 one-day internationals and 28 Twenty20 internationals. He was ultimately dropped from the ICC Elite Panel of Umpires after an annual review of their performance in June 2013. The council maintained that this was unrelated to his connection with the police investigation into spot-fixing. He consequently resigned as an umpire altogether.

=== 2013 IPL spot-fixing ===
Rauf's name cropped up during the 2013 IPL spot fixing controversy, prompting the ICC to remove him from the panel of match officials for the 2013 Champions Trophy. He was charged in September 2013 by Mumbai Police with illegal betting, cheating and fraud. He denied the allegations but refused to go to Mumbai to face the charges. In February 2016, Rauf was found guilty, and was banned for five years.

== Personal life ==
Upon his retirement from umpiring in cricket in 2016, Rauf operated a shoe shop in Lahore.

Rauf died following a cardiac arrest on 14 September 2022 in Lahore.

== See also ==
- List of Test cricket umpires
- List of One Day International cricket umpires
- List of Twenty20 International cricket umpires
