= ICC Cricket Code of Conduct =

Regulation regarding the conduct of cricket players

The ICC Cricket Code of Conduct is a regulation regarding the conduct of professional players in the sport of cricket. Traditionally, cricket requires "gentlemanly" conduct from all players. The Code of Conduct is written and enforced by the International Cricket Council.

Under the ICC regulations, players may be fined a percentage of their salary, banned for a number of matches, or even banned for a number of years or life. The ICC appoints a match referee for each Test match, One Day International and Twenty20; the Referee has the power to set penalties for most offences, the exceptions being the more serious ones.

The following are the general categories of serious offences, carrying the highest penalties:

- Gambling on matches (betting).
- Failing to perform in a match in return for a benefit, such as money or goods (match fixing).
- Inducing a player to perform one of the above two actions.
- Failure to report certain incidents relating to match-fixing or gambling.
- Other related offences.

Other offences are categorized as Level 1, Level 2, Level 3, or Level 4 as follows:

== Level 1 ==
- Breach of the Logo Policy (except for a commercial logo or player's bat logo).
- Abuse of equipment clothing, or any part of the ground.
- Showing dissent at an umpire's decision by word or by action.
- Using language or a gesture that is obscene, offensive or insulting.
- Excessive appealing.
- Aggressive pointing towards the pavilion by a member of the fielding side upon the dismissal of a batsman

== Level 2 ==
- Repeat of any Level 1 Offence within 12 months.
- Showing serious dissent at an umpire's decision by word or action.
- Breach of the Logo Policy relating to a commercial logo or a player's cricket bat logo.
- Public criticism of a match related incident or match official.
- Inappropriate and deliberate physical contact between players during play.
- Aggressively charging towards an umpire while appealing.
- Deliberate distraction or obstruction on the field.
- Throwing the cricket ball at a player, umpire or official in a dangerous manner.
- Using language or a gesture that is obscene, offensive or of a seriously insulting nature to another player, umpire, referee, team official or spectator.
- Any attempt to manipulate a match in regard to the result (In a negative way), net run rate, bonus points or otherwise. (Example: Intentionally losing so that a team will face a weaker opponent in the Finals.)

== Level 3 ==
- Repeat of any Level 2 Offence within 12 months.
- Changing the condition of the ball.
- Intimidation of an umpire or referee.
- Threat of assault on a player, team official, or spectator.
- Using language or gestures that offends race, religion, colour, descent or national or ethnic origin.

== Level 4 ==
- Repeat for any Level 3 Offence within 12 months.
- Threat of assault on an umpire or referee.
- Physical assault of another player, umpire, referee, official or spectator.
- Any act of violence during play.
- Using language or gestures that seriously offends race, religion, colour, descent or national or ethnic origin.

== Penalties ==
The penalties available for each offence are based on the level. The penalties are as follows:

- Level 1: Fine of 0% to 50% of match fee.
- Level 2: Fine of 50% to 100% of match fee and/or ban for 1 Test or 2 ODIs.
- Level 3: Ban for 6 Tests or 12 ODIs.
- Level 4: Ban for Tests to life or 20 ODIs to life.

Fines in Level 3 and 4 Offences are determined by the ICC without regard to match fee.

Offences relating to gambling or match-fixing carry penalties of bans from 12 months to life, and unlimited fines.

If an offence occurred in a Test match, then the ban for a number of Tests applies; if an offence occurred in an ODI, then the ban for a number of ODIs applies.
