= Tony Hill (umpire) =

New Zealand cricket umpire

Personal information
- Full name: Anthony Lloyd Hill
- Born: 26 June 1951 (age 75); Auckland, New Zealand
- Role: Umpire

Umpiring information
- Tests umpired: 40 (2001–2013)
- ODIs umpired: 96 (1998–2013)
- T20Is umpired: 17 (2005–2012)
- WTests umpired: 1 (1995)
- WODIs umpired: 19 (1995–2009)
- WT20Is umpired: 15 (2009–2012)
- Source: CricketArchive, 18 March 2021

Anthony Lloyd Hill (born 26 June 1951), commonly known as Tony Hill, is a retired international cricket umpire from New Zealand. He was a former member of the Elite Panel of ICC Umpires.

His first international fixture as an umpire was an ODI between New Zealand and Zimbabwe at Napier in March 1998, and he stood in his first test match in December 2001 between New Zealand and Bangladesh at Hamilton.

During his time on the International Panel the ICC has appointed Hill to matches away from New Zealand as a neutral umpire (to support the Elite Panel), and particular highlights are the third test between South Africa and Australia at Johannesburg in March 2006, as well as officiating on-field in three Group A matches at the 2007 Cricket World Cup in St. Kitts.

Hill was appointed to the ICC Elite Panel of umpires in 2009.
