= Daryl Harper =

Australian cricket umpire (born 1951)

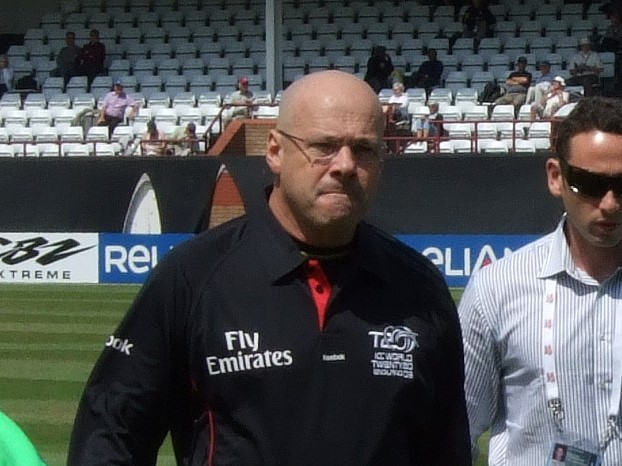
- Harper in 2009

Personal information
- Full name: Daryl John Harper
- Born: 23 October 1951 (age 75); Mile End, South Australia
- Batting: Right-handed
- Role: Batsman

Umpiring information
- Tests umpired: 94 (1998–2011)
- ODIs umpired: 174 (1994–2011)
- T20Is umpired: 10 (2007–2009)
- WODIs umpired: 2 (2002)
- WT20Is umpired: 3 (2009)
- FC umpired: 164 (1987–2011)
- LA umpired: 214 (1988–2011)
- Source: CricketArchive, 8 June 2011

Daryl John Harper (born 23 October 1951) is an Australian cricket umpire, who was a Test umpire between 1998 and 2011. He was a member of the ICC Elite Panel of Umpires from 2002 until 2011 when the ICC announced that Harper was being stood down at the termination of his contract in July 2011. In June 2011, following criticism from India during the India - West Indies Test series Harper retired from umpiring.

== Biography ==
Harper was born on 23 October 1951, in Mile End, South Australia, and attended Norwood High School before taking up primary school teaching. He had a brief career as an Australian rules football umpire before injury forced him to quit.

== Playing career ==
Harper played as a right-handed batsman in Adelaide grade cricket competition for the Teachers' College and East Torrens clubs.

== Umpiring ==
In 1983, he switched to umpiring, making his first-class cricket debut in 1987.

Harper made his first appearance in an international fixture in January 1994 when he umpired a One Day International (ODI) in Perth between New Zealand and South Africa. In November 1998, Harper made his test match umpiring debut when appointed to stand in the 2nd Ashes test at the WACA ground alongside umpire Venkat; Harper also stood at the MCG in the 4th test of that series. After promotion to the National Grid Panel of International Umpires, Harper also began to appear in Test matches away from Australia as the designated independent umpire.

In 2002, the International Cricket Council (ICC) introduced a policy of two independent umpires standing in each Test match, and one independent & one home umpire in ODIs. The independent umpires would be chosen from a newly conceived ICC Elite umpire panel comprising the ICC's determination of the top 8 - 10 umpires from around the world. Harper was included in the original line up for this panel, at the time chosen over fellow Australians Simon Taufel and Darrell Hair (both of whom subsequently joined the panel in 2003). Harper umpired the opening match of the 2003 Cricket World Cup in South Africa, and went on to stand in one of the semi-finals. On 31 August 2005, he adjudicated in his 100th ODI, a match between Zimbabwe and New Zealand at Harare.

He was the third umpire for a trial of the 'player referral' system in 2009. In 2010, England lodged a formal complaint against Harper after a referred caught behind decision was turned down because the volume supplied by the home broadcaster was not good enough to detect the edge.

The ICC dropped Harper from the 2010 ICC World Twenty20 due to "general performance reasons" and demoted him from the Elite Panel in May 2011. The ICC subsequently revealed that Harper would stand in two last Test matches; between West Indies and India at Sabina Park and Windsor Park.

Harper retired from umpiring following some heavy criticism from India during the first test against the West Indies. Dave Richardson, the ICC Cricket manager, said Harper received "unfair criticism" from the Indian players and that his correct decision making percentage against India was at 96 percent, which was "considerably above average". Harper said he got 94% of his decisions in the match right, but conceded he made two errors in the game.

== International Umpiring statistics ==
As of 4 June 2010:

| | First | Latest | Total |
|---|---|---|---|
| Tests | Australia v England at Perth, Nov 1998 | New Zealand v Pakistan at Wellington, Jan 2011 | 94 |
| ODIs | New Zealand v South Africa at Perth, Jan 1994 | Bangladesh v South Africa at Dhaka, March 2011 | 174 |
| T20Is | South Africa v West Indies at Johannesburg, Sep 2007 | Pakistan v Sri Lanka at Lord's, Jun 2009 | 10 |

Awards

- ICC Bronze Bails Award for 100 ODIs.

Ambassadorship

- In March 2009, Daryl Harper, was announced as an ambassador for Orana, an Adelaide company providing employment for people with disabilities.
- He is an ambassador for The Adelaide Crows.

== See also ==
- List of Test cricket umpires
- List of One Day International cricket umpires
- List of Twenty20 International cricket umpires
