= Match referee =

Official appointed to oversee professional cricket matches

A match referee is an official appointed to oversee professional cricket matches. Match referees for Test matches and One Day Internationals are appointed by the International Cricket Council (ICC). Most matches below international level do not have a referee.

The match referee's responsibility is to ensure that the ICC Cricket Code of Conduct is upheld during the game, to assess any breaches of the Code, and to hand out penalties for any breaches. Following every game, the match referee composes and submits a match report to the ICC, noting any events or actions by players or umpires that may be a concern in terms of the Code of Conduct or the Laws of Cricket, and giving ratings to the quality of the pitch.

The match referee remains off the field of play at all times during the actual play of the game, observing events from a spectator area. The referee makes no decisions regarding play; such decisions are the sole responsibility of the appointed umpires.

Match referees are frequently former cricket players who have had distinguished careers on the field. Some notable match referees include Ranjan Madugalle, Chris Broad, Jeff Crowe, David Boon and Javagal Srinath.

In recent years the law regarding throwing - the unlawful delivery of the cricket ball by a bowler because of straightening of the arm at the elbow - has been interpreted as the domain of the match referee and a system of reports to the ICC, rather than a matter for the umpires to decide as a no-ball at each incidence on the field. This de facto migration of responsibility has caused controversy, with some commentators claiming it has eroded the official support and authority owed to the umpires.
