= Bruce Oxenford =

Australian cricket umpire (born 1960)

Personal information
- Full name: Bruce Nicholas James Oxenford
- Born: 5 March 1960 (age 66); Southport, Queensland, Australia
- Batting: Right-handed
- Bowling: Leg break and googly
- Role: Bowler

Domestic team information
- Years: Team
- 1991/92–1992/93: Queensland
- FC debut: 13 December 1991 Queensland v Victoria
- Last FC: 8 January 1993 Queensland v South Australia

Umpiring information
- Tests umpired: 62 (2008–2021)
- ODIs umpired: 97 (2007–2020)
- T20Is umpired: 20 (2006–2016)
- WTests umpired: 1 (2003)
- WODIs umpired: 11 (2006–2022)
- WT20Is umpired: 15 (2012–2022)

Career statistics
Competition	First-class
Matches	8
Runs scored	112
Batting average	12.44
100s/50s	0/0
Top score	37
Balls bowled	1,487
Wickets	18
Bowling average	55.72
5 wickets in innings	1
10 wickets in match	0
Best bowling	5/91
Catches/stumpings	11/–
- Source: Cricinfo, 23 November 2023

Bruce Nicholas James Oxenford (born 5 March 1960) is an Australian former cricket umpire and a former cricketer. He has been an ICC international umpire since 2008, when he first umpired an ODI match. He went on to stand in his first Test match in 2010. On 26 September 2012, he was promoted to the ICC Elite Umpire Panel, the highest umpiring body in the game of cricket, replacing fellow Australian Simon Taufel, who retired from the panel to take up a newly created ICC supervisory and training position.

In January 2021, Oxenford retired from international umpiring, but would still officiate in domestic matches in Australia.

== Playing career ==
Oxenford played in eight first-class matches for Queensland during the 1991/92 and 1992/93 seasons.

== Umpiring career ==
Oxenford began umpiring in 1998 and went on to make his first-class umpiring debut in 2001. He was appointed to Cricket Australia's 12-man National Umpire Panel in 2003 and in 2007–08 was appointed to ICC International Panel of Umpires in the third umpire category.

His first Test match was in December 2010 between Sri Lanka and West Indies at Pallekele. He was elevated to the ICC Elite Panel of Umpires in 2012. He was selected as one of the twenty umpires to stand in matches during the 2015 Cricket World Cup.

On 30 August 2018, he officiated in his 50th Test as an on-field umpire, in the match between England and India.

In April 2019, he was named as one of the sixteen umpires to stand in matches during the 2019 Cricket World Cup.

== See also ==
- List of Test cricket umpires
- List of One Day International cricket umpires
- List of Twenty20 International cricket umpires
