= Ranjan Madugalle =

Sri Lankan cricketer

Deshabandu Ranjan Senerath Madugalle රන්ජන් සෙනරත් මඩුගල්ල
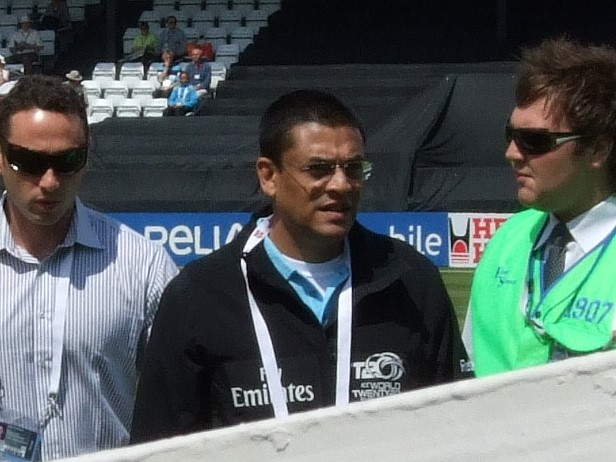
- Madugalle, centre, in 2009

Personal information
- Full name: Ranjan Senerath Madugalle
- Born: 22 April 1959 (age 67); Kandy, Sri Lanka
- Batting: Right-handed
- Bowling: Right arm off break

International information
- National side: Sri Lanka (1979–1988)
- Test debut (cap 7): 17 February 1982 v England
- Last Test: 30 August 1988 v England
- ODI debut (cap 19): 16 June 1979 v India
- Last ODI: 27 October 1988 v Pakistan

Domestic team information
- Years: Team
- 1988–1990: Nondescripts

Career statistics
| Competition | Test | ODI | FC | LA |
|---|---|---|---|---|
| Matches | 21 | 63 | 81 | 82 |
| Runs scored | 1,029 | 950 | 3,301 | 1,334 |
| Batting average | 29.40 | 18.62 | 32.04 | 19.91 |
| 100s/50s | 1/7 | 0/3 | 2/20 | 0/4 |
| Top score | 103 | 73 | 142* | 73 |
| Balls bowled | 84 | 4 | 342 | 22 |
| Wickets | 0 | 0 | 2 | 0 |
| Bowling average | – | – | 79.50 | – |
| 5 wickets in innings | – | – | 0 | – |
| 10 wickets in match | – | – | 0 | – |
| Best bowling | – | – | 1/18 | – |
| Catches/stumpings | 9/– | 18/– | 42/– | 27/– |
- Source: Cricinfo, 3 February 2010

Deshabandu Ranjan Senerath Madugalle (Sinhala: රන්ජන් සෙනරත් මඩුගල්ල, [randʒən senərat maɖugallə]; born 22 April 1959) is a former Sri Lankan cricketer who currently serves as the Chief of the panel of ICC match referees. He was educated at Trinity College, Kandy, and Royal College, Colombo.

He represented Sri Lanka in international cricket between 1979 and 1988, making his debut in the 1979 ICC Trophy final against Canada. He had the honor of being in the first Sri Lankan Test team in 1982, and top-scored in the first innings with 65 – making a 99-run partnership with Arjuna Ranatunga. Madugalle represented Sri Lanka in 21 test matches and 63 One Day Internationals and also captained Sri Lanka national cricket team in two test matches and 13 ODIs.

Madugalle retired from international cricket in 1988 at the age of 29. Subsequently, he has become a match referee for the International Cricket Council in 1993 and currently serves as the chief of the panel of ICC match referees. He was promoted to the position of chief match referee of the ICC in 2001 in which he has achieved record longevity, but courted controversy at times by exhibiting bias against the India and Pakistan teams early in his career.

== ODI career ==
Madugalle continued as a vital part of the Sri Lankan Test and ODI team, only missing one international game between 1979 and 1984. However, his ODI performances worried the Sri Lankan selectors, with only one fifty from 25 innings. He was shuffled around the order in an attempt to gain some form, but after scoring a duck in the second and last ODI against New Zealand in 1984, he was dropped for the first three matches of the 1984–85 World Series Cup in Australia. A couple of seasons followed where he was in and out of the team, but a major reorganisation of the squad following the tour of India in 1986–87 gave him the chance again, and he seized it with a Test 60 against New Zealand.

== Performance outside Sri Lanka ==
Madugalle was never a good tourist, only averaging 21.50 with the bat abroad, while he averaged 42.76 on traditionally tricky Sri Lankan pitches. Indeed, his only century came in a home match – the first match of the 3-Test series against India in 1985. Madugalle took nearly seven hours to forge his 103, but it ensured in a drawn match. In the next match, he only batted once, making 54 from number three to build a solid platform for the next batsmen, which eventually led to a comfortable 149-run victory. They drew the third Test – despite scores of 5 and 10 from Madugalle, and Sri Lanka had won their first Test series.

== Performance as captain ==
In 1988 he was appointed captain of the Sri Lankan cricket team, but his team troubled neither Australia, nor England under Madugalle's leadership. Madugalle himself recorded four sub-20 scores as captain, and the two Tests he captained became his last. He also captained the ODI team in his last 13 matches, winning two and losing eleven, but again he failed to back up his captaincy with runs – only passing 25 twice. However, Sri Lanka did win in his very last match, with a five-wicket win over Pakistan in the 1988 Asia Cup – in which Madugalle did not bat.

He also played league cricket in England – particularly in 1979 for Flowery Field Cricket Club, who were then in the Saddleworth League.

== Retirement and match referee ==
Madugalle only made two international fifties after the '85 India series, both in Tests, and eventually he retired to become a marketing executive in a multinational corporation. He became involved as a match referee in 1993. He progressed through the International Cricket Council ranks, refereeing over 750 international matches in 30 years. Thus, he officiated in many more international matches than he played. In 2001, he was appointed as the chief match referee by the ICC. In addition to being seen as an establishment man, his record in being impartial has been questioned by Asian fans - he was seen as harsh on the Indian and in particular Pakistani teams while being relatively light on Australian teams.

Madugalle set the record for becoming the most experienced match referee in ODIs, refereeing the 2019 World Cup Final, and in 2024 will referee his 400th, holding the record of 397 in January 2024. He holds the record for being a match referee in most ODIs.(304)

He also has the record for becoming the first match referee to officially take part in 100+ Tests. In fact, he's the only match referee in test history to take part in 100 as well as 150 and 200 test matches. He still holds the record for being a match referee in most Test matches (214).

He also holds the record for being a match referee in most T20I matches at 142.

Madugalle has officially been a match referee in the most international cricket matches, with over 750 international matches.

In 2019, Ranjan Madugalle officiated as the match referee of the 2019 Cricket World Cup final.

Ranjan Madugalle, on 7 August 2024, became the first match referee to officiate in 400 men's ODIs, reaching this landmark in the third and final ODI between Sri Lanka and India of the Indian cricket team in Sri Lanka in 2024 series.

== Controversies ==
During his early tenure as a referee, Ranjan Madugalle courted controversy at times by exhibiting bias against Asian teams, the most notable incidents of which occurred during the Indian tour of Australia in 1999–2000.

== See also ==
- Elite Panel of ICC Referees
