= Steve Bucknor =

Jamaican cricket umpire and coach

The Honourable Steve Bucknor OJ
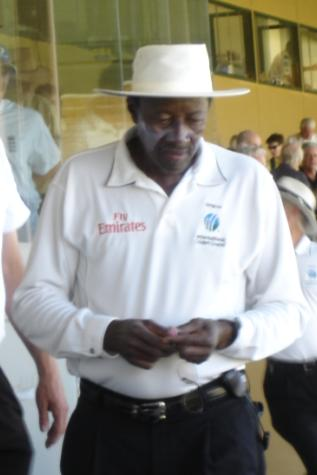

Personal information
- Full name: Stephen Anthony Bucknor
- Born: 31 May 1946 (age 80); Montego Bay, Jamaica
- Height: 6 ft 3 in (1.91 m)

Umpiring information
- Tests umpired: 128 (1989–2009)
- ODIs umpired: 181 (1989–2009)
- FC umpired: 172 (1988–2009)
- LA umpired: 221 (1978–2009)
- Source: CricketArchive, 15 June 2013

Stephen Anthony Bucknor, OJ (born 31 May 1946) is a Jamaican former international cricket umpire.

Bucknor umpired in a record 128 Test matches between 1989 and 2009, and also umpired in 181 One Day Internationals during this period, including five consecutive Cricket World Cup finals from 1992 to 2007. Before becoming a cricket umpire, he was a football player, referee and a high school mathematics teacher. In October 2007, he was awarded the Order of Jamaica, Commander Class, for "outstanding services in the field of sports".

== Football goalkeeper ==
Bucknor played as a goalkeeper in Jamaican parish leagues in the 1960s. In 1964 he played in goal for Jamaica in a schoolboy international versus Brazil, which Jamaica drew 1–1.

== Football referee ==
Bucknor was a FIFA referee in a CONCACAF and World Cup qualifier between El Salvador and the Netherlands Antilles in 1988.

== Cricket umpire ==
Bucknor's first international cricket fixture was a One Day International (ODI) between the West Indies and India at Antigua on 18 March 1989. His first Test match was at Sabina Park, Kingston, Jamaica, between 28 April and 3 May 1989, with the competing teams again being the West Indies and India. After umpiring in a few international matches, he was selected to umpire at the 1992 Cricket World Cup, held in Australia and New Zealand, and went on to stand in the final despite being quite inexperienced. Bucknor also officiated in the next four World Cup finals in 1996, 1999, 2003 and 2007, with the 2007 World Cup taking place in his native West Indies.

In 1994 the ICC introduced a policy whereby one of the umpires in each Test match would be independent of the competing nations, selected from an International Panel of Umpires. Bucknor was a member of this panel from its foundation until the ICC changed its policy on umpires again in 2002. Since then both umpires in Test matches, and one of the umpires in ODIs have been independent of the competing countries. The officials are now chosen from the Elite Panel of ICC Umpires, whom the ICC consider to be the world's best umpires. Bucknor maintained a place on the Elite Panel from its foundation until his retirement.

In May 2006, he accused TV companies of doctoring their images to make umpires look bad and key players look good. Bucknor was one of the standing umpires in the 2007 Cricket World Cup final, during which play continued despite very poor light. Consequently, he and the four other officials involved were suspended from the 2007 ICC World Twenty20 in South Africa. Dave Richardson, the general manager of cricket at the ICC, has said Bucknor's umpiring accuracy was at 96% during 2005–06, above the average of 94.8% for the Elite Panel. In 2007, he was short-listed for the Umpire of the Year award, which was ultimately won by Simon Taufel. In January 2008, he was removed by the ICC from officiating in the third Test between Australia and India in Perth, and replaced by Billy Bowden, after his several incorrect decisions in the second Test in Sydney had contributed to India's defeat. Former umpire Dickie Bird suggested that Bucknor had "gone on too long", while Bucknor blamed the BCCI's financial power for his ouster.

Looking back on his career, Bucknor recalled making several incorrect decisions against Sachin Tendulkar from India. The ICC confirmed on 23 February 2009 that Bucknor had decided to retire from umpiring in March 2009. His final Test match was the 3rd Test between South Africa and Australia at Cape Town on 19–23 March, and his last One Day International match was the 4th ODI between his native West Indies and England at Barbados on 29 March, bringing his 20-year career as an official to an end.

== Achievements as an umpire ==
=== Cricket World Cup ===
Bucknor has stood as an onfield umpire in five World Cup tournaments, during which he has officiated 44 matches including five finals.

=== Test match record ===
Bucknor held the record for the most Test matches umpired until December 2019, when Aleem Dar of Pakistan stood in his 129th Test match as an on-field umpire, surpassing his record of officiating in the most number of Test matches. He was the first umpire to have officiated in over 100 Test matches.

=== Awards ===
Bucknor has received the ICC's Bronze Bails Awards for umpiring in 100 ODIs, as well as the Golden Bails Award for umpiring 100 Test matches.
