= Andy Pycroft =

Zimbabwean cricketer (born 1956)

Personal information
- Full name: Andrew John Pycroft
- Born: 6 June 1956 (age 70); Salisbury, Southern Rhodesia
- Batting: Right-handed
- Bowling: Right-arm offbreak
- Role: Batsman

International information
- National side: Zimbabwe (1983–1992)
- Test debut (cap 10): 18 October 1992 v India
- Last Test: 7 November 1992 v New Zealand
- ODI debut (cap 9): 9 June 1983 v Australia
- Last ODI: 18 March 1992 v England

Domestic team information
- Years: Team
- 1975/76–1978/79: Western Province B

Career statistics
Competition	Test	ODI	FC	LA
Matches	3	20	72	100
Runs scored	152	295	4,374	2,576
Batting average	30.40	17.35	38.03	29.60
100s/50s	0/1	0/2	5/31	1/17
Top score	60	61	133	104
Balls bowled	–	–	87	12
Wickets	–	–	1	0
Bowling average	–	–	52.00	–
5 wickets in innings	–	–	0	–
10 wickets in match	–	–	0	–
Best bowling	–	–	1/0	–
Catches/stumpings	2/–	6/–	63/–	38/–
- Source: CricketArchive, 3 August 2016

Andrew John Pycroft (born 6 June 1956) is a Zimbabwean match referee and former cricketer who played in 3 Test matches and 20 One Day Internationals from 1983 to 1992. After his cricket career, Pycroft served as a national selector and coach for Zimbabwe national cricket team before being appointed to the ICC Elite Panel of Match Refereesin 2009.

== Early life and education ==
Pycroft was born in Salisbury, Southern Rhodesia (now Harare, Zimbabwe) on 6 June 1956. He was educated at the Diocesan College in Cape Town, South Africa. He also qualified as a lawyer.

== Cricket career ==
He played for Rhodesia prior to Zimbabwe's independence. He also represented the Zimbabwean team (1980 onwards) and the Western Province in the South African domestic competition.

== Coaching career ==
After his retirement, Pycroft coached Zimbabwe national under-19 cricket team and served as a national selector. By 2001, he was Zimbabwe's chief selector and was briefly appointed as the coach of Zimbabwe national cricket team. During the 2003 Cricket World Cup, disputes arose over team selection. On 11 March 2003, Pycroft resigned from his role as a selector, citing differences with the board's selection policies.

He later worked as a cricket commentator before being appointed coach of the Zimbabwe A team in 2006. He held this position until August 2008, when his contract was terminated by the Zimbabwe Cricket.

== Match referee ==
Pycroft became a member of the Elite Panel of ICC Match Referees in March 2009.

In 2018, during a Test in Cape Town where Australian cricketers were found to have tampered with the ball, he imposed sanctions that included a one-match ban on captain Steve Smith and fines for David Warner and Cameron Bancroft.

=== Pakcroft ===
In September 2025, Pycroft was at the centre of controversy in the India-Pakistan fixture at the 2025 Asia Cup for allowing the captains to forego the shaking of hands at the toss amid political tensions between the countries.

The Pakistan Cricket Board wrote to the ICC accusing him of breaching the ICC Code of Conduct and Spirit of Cricket, and they requested the removal of Pycroft as match referee for rest of the tournament. Pakistan delayed taking the field for its subsequent match until the PCB announced that Pycroft had described the situation as a "miscommunication" and had apologized to Pakistan's team management. An internal ICC investigation cleared Pycroft of wrongdoing. The dispute delayed the start of Pakistan's next match by approximately one hour. The PCB withdrew its boycott threat, and Pycroft continued to officiate in the tournament.

== See also ==
- Elite Panel of ICC Referees
