= Chris Broad (cricketer) =

English cricketer

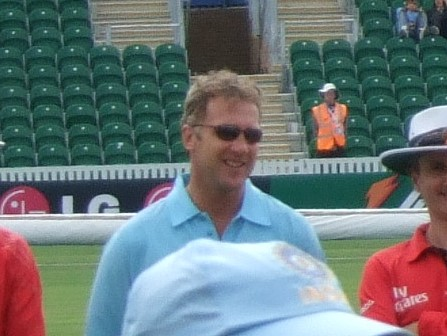

Personal information
- Full name: Brian Christopher Broad
- Born: 29 September 1957 (age 69); Knowle, Bristol, England
- Nickname: Walter, Broodie, B-Road
- Height: 6 ft 4 in (1.93 m)
- Batting: Left-handed
- Bowling: Right arm medium
- Role: Opening batsman
- Relatives: Stuart Broad (son)

International information
- National side: England
- Test debut (cap 506): 28 June 1984 v West Indies
- Last Test: 17 June 1989 v Australia
- ODI debut (cap 90): 1 January 1987 v Australia
- Last ODI: 24 May 1988 v West Indies

Domestic team information
- Years: Team
- 1979–1983: Gloucestershire
- 1984–1992: Nottinghamshire
- 1985/86: Orange Free State
- 1993–1994: Gloucestershire

Career statistics
Competition	Test	ODI	FC	LA
Matches	25	34	340	319
Runs scored	1,661	1,361	21,892	10,396
Batting average	39.54	40.02	38.07	34.76
100s/50s	6/6	1/11	50/105	11/68
Top score	162	106	227*	122
Balls bowled	6	6	1631	1027
Wickets	0	0	16	25
Bowling average	–	–	64.81	36.80
5 wickets in innings	–	–	0	0
10 wickets in match	–	–	0	0
Best bowling	–	–	2/14	3/46
Catches/stumpings	10/–	10/–	189/–	82/–
Medal record
Men's Cricket
Representing England
ICC Cricket World Cup
Runner-up	1987 India and Pakistan
- Source: CricketArchive, 24 December 2007

Brian Christopher Broad (born 29 September 1957) is an English cricket official, broadcaster, and former player. He was a part of the English squad which finished as runners-up at the 1987 Cricket World Cup.

As an opening batsman, he played 26 Test matches for England and scored six centuries, together with 34 One Day International matches with a respectable over 40 average. He is known largely for his feats during the 1986/87 Ashes series where he hit three centuries in consecutive Tests, and for his fiery demeanour at the crease.

Broad's children are both involved in cricket. His son Stuart Broad is a fast bowler who, like his father, has represented both England and Nottinghamshire, while his daughter Gemma worked as a performance analyst with England's One-Day squad. Cricket correspondent Colin Bateman noted, "Chris Broad pressed the self-destruct button on a career that promised so much. His lack of self-control at the crease brought a sad end to his reign as England opener at the age of 30, when he should have been enjoying his prime years".

== Early life and domestic career ==
Born 29 September 1957, in Knowle, Bristol, to parents Ken and Nancy, Broad suffered from osteomyelitis at the age of 15, which delayed his development as a cricketer. His first-class debut came for Gloucestershire in 1979 and he secured a permanent place in the team the following summer, before moving to Nottinghamshire in 1984. He also played for Orange Free State in 1985–86. Returning to Gloucestershire in 1993, Broad retired at the end of the 1994 season with a hip injury. He is a past student of St Paul's College, Cheltenham.

== International record ==
Broad made his Test debut for England in 1984, in the second Test match against the West Indies at Lord's. Opening the batting with Graeme Fowler, Broad scored 55 in an opening partnership of 101 runs. Fowler went on to score 106 runs; however, England were bowled out for 286. The West Indies reached 245 in response. England's second innings began poorly, Broad being dismissed for a duck having faced only nine balls, and the West Indies reached the 342 run target set for them thanks to 214* from Gordon Greenidge. Broad therefore averaged 27.50 in his debut Test match.

Broad opened in the next Test match against the West Indies at Headingley, Yorkshire beginning on 12 July 1984, scoring 32 and two. He scored 42 and 21 in the next Test, and four and 39 in the final Test of the series, ending his first series with 195 runs at 24.37. Broad then played one Test match against Sri Lanka, scoring his highest score thus far, 86 in a drawn Test match. Broad did not play for England again until 14 November 1986 during the 1986 Ashes series. He began quietly with eight and 35*, however in the second Test at Perth he scored 162 and 16. He then scored 116 and 15* at Adelaide, 112 at Melbourne and six and 17 in Sydney. He ended this Ashes tour with 487 runs and three centuries from nine innings. He scored centuries in three consecutive matches, only the eighth Englishman at the time to have achieved this feat (five more have achieved it subsequently).

At this time Broad made his One Day International debut in 1986, against Australia in Perth, Western Australia where he scored 76 and England won by 37 runs.

In his only tour of Pakistan in 1987. Broad was severely reprimanded by the tour manager after refusing to walk when given out caught behind in the second innings of the Lahore Test match. Broad had stood his ground and almost a minute elapsed before Gooch persuaded him to go. The game was marred by numerous allegations of unfair dismissals by the umpires. Mike Gatting, the England captain, let his views on these decisions be known, both on the pitch and in the press conference after the day's play.

He was dropped ostensibly for a lack of form, but it was also widely viewed that the England management did not agree with his temperament – he famously knocked his stumps out of the ground after being bowled in the 1988 Sydney Bicentennial Test. He was fined the maximum permitted (£500) by the tour manager. Broad last played for England in the second Test against Australia in 1989, having played in 25 Test matches with a high score of 162 and an average of 39.54. Unusually, he made all of his centuries outside England – four in Australia, one in New Zealand and one in Pakistan.

Broad was a member of the unofficial England XI for the controversial rebel tour to South Africa in 1989–90.

== Test official ==
In 2003, Broad was appointed as a match referee for Test matches and One Day Internationals by the International Cricket Council, beginning with the 2003–04 series between New Zealand and Pakistan.

In 2009, Broad was the match referee for the Test series between Pakistan and Sri Lanka. During the second Test in Lahore, he was in a convoy of vehicles that was attacked by terrorists. During the attack he reportedly risked his life to protect an injured umpire. He and umpire Simon Taufel subsequently criticised the level of protection provided to officials and players, saying in a press conference, "We were promised high levels of security and in our hour of need that security vanished". Six Pakistani policemen and two civilians were killed during the attack, and six Sri Lankan cricketers were injured.

In 2023, Broad tweeted a meme about son Stuart dismissing David Warner again in Test cricket. He was supposedly rebuked for this by the ICC and then deleted the tweet.

== The Broad Appeal ==
Broad's second wife, Miche, was diagnosed with motor neurone disease (MND) in spring 2009. She took her own life the following year in July. Together with his children Stuart and Gemma, Broad established the charity "The Broad Appeal" in February 2011 to raise both awareness of and funds for MND.
