= Elite Panel of ICC Umpires =

Top level of professional field judges in cricket

The Elite Panel of ICC Umpires is a panel of cricket umpires appointed by the International Cricket Council to officiate in Test matches and One Day Internationals around the world. The panel was first established in April 2002 when the ICC decided to reform the way that international cricket was umpired. The main change was that both umpires in a Test match and one of the umpires in a One Day International were now independent of the competing nations, whereas before 2002 just one of the umpires in a Test was independent and in ODIs both umpires were from the home nation. The majority of these ICC appointments are fulfilled by the members of the Elite Panel, who are generally thought to be the best umpires in the world. As such the ICC hopes to ensure that umpiring standards are as high as possible. Members of the panel stand in around 10 Tests and 15 ODIs each year. The list of umpires in the panel is revised every year by the ICC Umpires Selection Panel.

== History ==
The panel was formed in 2002 with eight members. Peter Willey was invited to be on the panel, but declined the opportunity because it would have required him to spend too much time away from his family. The last members of the original panel retired in 2011. The original eight panel members were: Steve Bucknor, Daryl Harper, Ashoka de Silva, Srinivas Venkataraghavan, Rudi Koertzen, Dave Orchard, David Shepherd and Russell Tiffin.

Members of the International Panel of ICC Umpires stand in ODIs in their home countries, and may be appointed by the ICC to Tests and ODIs as an independent officials at busy times in the cricket calendar to supplement the Elite Panel. The best performing umpires may earn promotion to the Elite Panel. Emirates sponsors the panel, and the umpires are required to wear shirts and coats which have 'Fly Emirates' printed on them whenever they are officiating.

In July 2019, Michael Gough and Joel Wilson were added to the Elite panel following the retirement of Ian Gould and exclusion of Sundaram Ravi after the 2019 Cricket World Cup. On 16 March 2023, Ahsan Raza and Adrian Holdstock joined the panel after Aleem Dar stepped down from the panel.

In March 2024, Sharfuddoula was added to the Elite Panel after South African umpire Marais Erasmus retired from umpiring in international cricket and thus Sharfuddoula became the first umpire from Bangladesh to be included in this panel.

In March 2025, Alex Wharf and Allahudien Paleker were added to the Elite Panel, after Michael Gough and Joel Wilson were dropped from the panel.

As of 7 February 2026, Australia and England have jointly provided the most panel members with seven. South Africa have provided five; India, Pakistan, New Zealand, and West Indies have provided three; Sri Lanka has provided two; Zimbabwe and Bangladesh has provided just one member. No members have featured from Afghanistan and Ireland, among the full members.

== Current members ==
As of 31 October 2026 cricket season, the Elite Panel consists of:

List of Elite Panel of ICC Umpires
Umpire	Date of Birth	Age as of 19 November 2026	Year Appointed	Tests	ODIs	T20Is	Country
Rod Tucker	28 August 1964	62 years, 83 days	2010	103	110	66	Australia
Kumar Dharmasena	24 April 1971	55 years, 209 days	2011	98	144	52	Sri Lanka
Richard Kettleborough	15 March 1973	53 years, 249 days	2011	100	114	46	England
Richard Illingworth	23 August 1963	63 years, 46 days	2013	87	109	43	England
Paul Reiffel	19 April 1966	60 years, 214 days	2013	81	100	38	Australia
Chris Gaffaney	30 November 1975	51 years, 20 days	2015	70	94	57	New Zealand
Nitin Menon	2 November 1983	43 years, 17 days	2020	39	64	64	India
Ahsan Raza	29 May 1974	52 years, 174 days	2023	31	70	91	Pakistan
Adrian Holdstock	27 April 1970	56 years, 206 days	2023	24	70	60	South Africa
Sharfuddoula	16 October 1976	50 years, 34 days	2024	24	76	60	Bangladesh
Alex Wharf	4 June 1975	51 years, 168 days	2025	16	43	52	England
Allahudien Paleker	1 January 1978	48 years, 322 days	2025	13	36	73	South Africa

== Former members ==
The first departures from the panel came in 2004 when Srinivas Venkataraghavan (known as Venkat) retired, and Asoka de Silva, Dave Orchard and Russell Tiffin did not have their contracts renewed. David Shepherd retired in 2005 following 22 years as an international umpire. Darrell Hair, who joined the panel in 2003, was banned from officiating in matches involving full ICC members following the ball tampering controversy in August 2006. In March 2008, following a spell officiating associate members, Hair was once again permitted to umpire full members, but in August he handed in his resignation after he was only allowed to officiate in two Tests.

Steve Bucknor retired in 2009, having stood in a then record 128 Tests since March 1989. Rudi Koertzen retired in 2010, while Mark Benson, who had joined the panel in 2006, stood down to return to domestic cricket. Asoka de Silva, who rejoined the panel in 2008, was stood down again in 2011 along with Daryl Harper, Simon Taufel and Billy Doctrove retired in 2012 and Steve Davis retired in 2015. Sundaram Ravi was dropped from the panel after 2019 Cricket World Cup. Ian Gould retired from the panel after the 2019 World Cup. Bruce Oxenford retired from the panel in 2021.

Former elite panel members can still umpire in ODIs and international T20s. Statistics correct as of 31 January 2021.

- † Original panel member

List of Former members of Elite Panel of ICC Umpires
Umpire	Date of Birth	Joined Panel	Left Panel	Tests	ODIs	T20Is	Country
Dave Orchard †	24 June 1948	2002	2004	44	107	–	South Africa
Russell Tiffin †	4 June 1959	2002	2004	44	126	4	Zimbabwe
Srinivas Venkataraghavan †	21 April 1945	2002	2004	73	52	–	India
David Shepherd †	27 December 1940	2002	2005	92	172	–	England
Darrell Hair	30 September 1952	2003	2008	78	135	6	Australia
Steve Bucknor †	31 May 1946	2002	2009	128	182	–	West Indies
Mark Benson	6 July 1958	2006	2010	27	72	19	England
Rudi Koertzen †	26 March 1949	2002	2010	108	206	14	South Africa
Asoka de Silva (Note: de Silva was absent from the panel between 2004 and 2008.) †	28 March 1956	2002	2011	49	122	11	Sri Lanka
Daryl Harper †	23 October 1951	2002	2011	94	174	10	Australia
Billy Doctrove	3 July 1955	2006	2012	38	112	17	West Indies
Simon Taufel	21 January 1971	2003	2012	74	174	34	Australia
Asad Rauf	12 May 1956	2006	2013	49	98	23	Pakistan
Tony Hill	26 June 1951	2009	2014	40	97	17	New Zealand
Billy Bowden	11 April 1967	2003	2015	84	200	24	New Zealand
Steve Davis	9 April 1952	2008	2015	57	137	26	Australia
Ian Gould	19 August 1957	2009	2019	74	141	37	England
Sundaram Ravi	22 April 1966	2015	2019	33	48	18	India
Nigel Llong	11 February 1969	2012	2020	62	130	32	England
Bruce Oxenford	5 March 1960	2012	2021	62	97	20	Australia
Aleem Dar	6 June 1968	2004	2023	145	231	72	Pakistan
Marais Erasmus	27 February 1964	2010	2024	82	124	43	South Africa
Michael Gough	18 December 1979	2019	2025	42	92	28	England
Joel Wilson	30 December 1966	2019	2025	47	98	50	West Indies

== Records ==
=== Test matches ===
Most Test matches as an umpire:

Umpire	Period	Matches	TV Umpire	Total
(Pakistan) Aleem Dar	2000–2023	145	27	172
(Cricket West Indies) Steve Bucknor	1989–2009	128	2	130
(South Africa) Rudi Koertzen	1992–2010	108	20	128
(Australia) Rod Tucker	2006–present	102	44	146
(England) Richard Kettleborough	2010–present	100	39	139
Last updated: 17 October 2026

=== ODI matches ===
Most ODI matches as an umpire:

Umpire	Period	Matches	TV Umpire	Total
(Pakistan) Aleem Dar	2003–2023	231	68	299
(South Africa) Rudi Koertzen	1992–2010	209	41	250
(New Zealand) Billy Bowden	1995–2016	200	59	259
(Cricket West Indies) Steve Bucknor	1989–2009	181	26	207
(Australia) Daryl Harper	1994–2011	174	45	219
Last updated: 6 February 2026

=== T20I matches ===
Most T20I matches as an umpire:

Umpire	Period	Matches	TV Umpire	Total
(Malaysia) Viswanadan Kalidas	2019–present	109	14	123
(Zimbabwe) Langton Rusere	2015–present	93	31	124
(Pakistan) Ahsan Raza	2010–present	91	33	124
(Nepal) Buddhi Pradhan	2012–present	78	4	82
(South Africa) Allahudien Paleker	2018–present	73	17	90
Last updated: 26 September 2026

== See also ==
- Elite Panel of ICC Referees
- International Panel of ICC Umpires
- List of Test umpires
- Development Panel of ICC Umpires
