= Simon Taufel =

Australian cricket umpire

Personal information
- Full name: Simon James Arthur Taufel
- Born: 21 January 1971 (age 55); St Leonards, New South Wales, Australia
- Bowling: Fast-medium bowler
- Role: Bowler, umpire

Domestic team information
- Years: Team
- 1990–1991: Cammeray CC

Umpiring information
- Tests umpired: 74 (2000–2012)
- ODIs umpired: 174 (1999–2012)
- T20Is umpired: 34 (2007–2012)
- WODIs umpired: 7 (2000)
- WT20Is umpired: 2 (2009)
- Source: ESPNCricinfo, 6 October 2012

Simon James Arthur Taufel (born 21 January 1971) is an Australian former cricket umpire who was earlier a member of the ICC Elite umpire panel. He won five consecutive ICC umpire of the year awards between 2004 and 2008, and is widely regarded as one of the top 10 greatest umpires of all time. He announced his retirement from international cricket on 26 September 2012, after the 2012 ICC World Twenty20 final. He subsequently worked as the ICC's Umpire Performance and Training Manager until October 2015. In 2020 he joined the Channel Seven commentary team as an expert commentator for the 2020/21 test series.

== Playing career ==
Taufel played for Cammeray Cricket Club in the Northern Suburbs Cricket Association as a fast-medium bowler. After the 1990–1991 season he won the club's best and fairest award, was leading wicket-taker and had the lowest bowling average in the association. His career was cut short by a back injury.

== Umpiring career ==
Despite initially having no intention of becoming an umpire, he agreed to go along with a friend to an umpiring course. After he passed the subsequent exam he began umpiring grade cricket. He quickly progressed through the ranks and made his first-class debut in 1995, aged just 24.

=== International cricket ===
Taufel stood in his first One Day International (ODI) on 13 January 1999 in the match between Australia and Sri Lanka at Sydney when he was 27 years old. He umpired his first Test match in December 2000 – the Boxing Day Test between Australia and West Indies at Melbourne. He became a member of the Emirates International Panel of ICC Umpires in 2002. He was chosen to umpire at the 2003 Cricket World Cup.

Taufel has been named the top umpire of the year five times, and in August 2006 the ICC's annual umpire review officially ranked second for accuracy (behind Darrell Hair), and top overall. He umpired in the final of the 2004 Champions Trophy. At the 2006 Champions Trophy he umpired a semi-final, but could not umpire the final because Australia had reached the final. In January 2007 he became the youngest umpire to stand in 100 ODIs, and in April 2007 took charge of the World Cup semi-final between New Zealand and Sri Lanka, again being ineligible for the final which featured Australia. He umpired alongside Aleem Dar in the final of the 2011 Cricket World Cup between Sri Lanka and India, gaining the opportunity to do so after Australia were knocked out by India in the Quarter Finals.

On 3 March 2009, Taufel was one of the officials caught in the attack on the Sri Lanka cricket team by terrorists in Lahore, Pakistan.

Taufel quit international cricket after the 2012 ICC World Twenty20 in Sri Lanka, at which he was umpiring at the time. He stepped down from cricket's elite panel of umpires to take over a new role as the ICC's Umpire Performance and Training Manager. He resigned from that role in October 2015.

After retiring from international umpiring in 2012, Simon Taufel remained active in the cricketing world, taking on various officiating roles in domestic and franchise tournaments.

Notably:

International League T20 (ILT20): In January 2025, Taufel officiated the opening match of ILT20 Season 3 between Dubai Capitals and MI Emirates. He also served as a match referee throughout the tournament, alternating with Roshan Mahanama.

International Masters League (IML): In February 2025, Taufel returned to the field as an umpire for the inaugural International Masters League, a T20 tournament featuring retired cricketing legends. He led the umpiring panel alongside Billy Bowden, with Gundappa Viswanath serving as the match referee. The league took place from February 22 to March 16, 2025, across Navi Mumbai, Vadodara, and Raipur.

== Accolades ==
Taufel won the ICC Umpire of the Year for the first five years of its existence (2004–2008). His winning streak was broken in October 2009, when Aleem Dar of Pakistan won the ICC Umpire of the Year award.

Taufel is the youngest person to have received the ICC's Bronze Bails Award for umpiring 100 ODIs.

== See also ==
- List of Test cricket umpires
- List of One Day International cricket umpires
- List of Twenty20 International cricket umpires
