= 2025 Champions Trophy final =

Cricket final

- Match programme cover
- Event: 2025 Champions Trophy
New Zealand	India
(New Zealand)	(India)
251/7	254/6
50	49
- India won by 4 wickets
- Date: 9 March 2025
- Venue: Dubai International Cricket Stadium, Dubai
- Player of the match: Rohit Sharma (Ind)
- Umpires: Richard Illingworth (Eng) and Paul Reiffel (Aus)
- Attendance: 25,000

The 2025 Champions Trophy final was a One Day International (ODI) cricket match played at the Dubai International Cricket Stadium on 9 March 2025 to determine the winner of 2025 Champions Trophy. It was played between India and New Zealand. It was the second time that India and New Zealand played a Champions Trophy final against each other, after the 2000 final.

New Zealand won the toss and electing to bat first, they registered a score of 251/7. In the second innings, India managed to chase the score 254/6 and thus India claimed the victory by 4 wickets to win third ICC Champions Trophy title while also becoming the first team to win all their matches and win a ICC Champions Trophy undefeated. Rohit Sharma was named Player of the Match for scoring 76 runs off 83 balls.

== Background ==
The 2025 Champions Trophy was the ninth edition of the ICC Champions Trophy, a quadrennial ODI cricket tournament organised by the International Cricket Council (ICC). In November 2021 as part of the 2024–2031 ICC men's hosts cycle, the ICC announced that the 2025 Champions Trophy would be played in Pakistan.

On 19 December 2024, following an agreement between Board of Control for Cricket in India (BCCI) and Pakistan Cricket Board (PCB), the ICC announced that India and Pakistan matches at ICC events hosted by India or Pakistan in the 2024–2027 ICC Events cycle would be played at a neutral venue. On 24 December 2024, the ICC announced the tournament's schedule, with Dubai International Cricket Stadium as the neutral venue for the tournament and final scheduled on 9 March 2025. The ICC further stated, that if India qualifies for the final, it would played at Dubai International Cricket Stadium, otherwise it would be played at Gaddafi Stadium in Lahore.

This was India's fifth Champions Trophy final after 2000, 2002, 2013 and 2017 while it was New Zealand's third final after 2000 and 2009. Before this match, India and New Zealand had played each other only twice in the Champions Trophy, with both teams winning one match each.

== Road to the final ==
=== Overview ===
- Source: Cricinfo

India				vs	New Zealand
Opponent	Date	Result	Points	Match	Opponent	Date	Result	Points
Group A				Group stage	Group A
Bangladesh	20 February 2025	Won	2	1	Pakistan	19 February 2025	Won	2
Pakistan	23 February 2025	Won	4	2	Bangladesh	24 February 2025	Won	4
New Zealand	2 March 2025	Won	6	3	India	2 March 2025	Lost	4
Semi-final 1				Knockout stage	Semi-final 2
Australia	4 March 2025	Won		SF	South Africa	5 March 2025	Won
2025 Champions Trophy final

=== India ===
India were undefeated from the first match to the semi finals. They began their Champions Trophy campaign with a victory over Bangladesh and went on to defeat their arch-rivals Pakistan. Later, they defeated New Zealand by 44 runs and finished the group stage as winners of Group A. They then defeated Australia in the semi-finals to earn their place in the Champions Trophy final for a record fifth time after 2000, 2002, 2013 and 2017.

=== New Zealand ===
New Zealand began their Champions Trophy campaign with a victory over the hosts Pakistan and went on to defeat Bangladesh. However, they lost their last group stage match to India and finished second in Group A. Later, they defeated South Africa in the semi-finals to earn their place in the Champions Trophy final for the third time after 2000 and 2009.

== Match ==
=== Match officials ===
On 6 March 2025, the International Cricket Council (ICC) named England's Richard Illingworth and Australia's Paul Reiffel as the on-field umpires, along with West Indies' Joel Wilson as the third umpire, Sri Lanka's Kumar Dharmasena as the reserve umpire, and Ranjan Madugalle as match referee.

- On-field umpires: Richard Illingworth (Eng) and Paul Reiffel (Aus)
- TV umpire: Joel Wilson (WI)
- Reserve umpire: Kumar Dharmasena (SL)
- Match referee: Ranjan Madugalle (SL)

=== Teams and toss ===
New Zealand's captain Mitchell Santner won the toss and elected to bat. India remained unchanged from the side that played the semi-final, while New Zealand brought Nathan Smith in place of Matt Henry.

=== New Zealand's innings ===
New Zealand openers Will Young and Rachin Ravindra made a good start with a 57-run partnership until, Varun Chakravarthy dismissed Young in the end of the 8th over. Later, Kuldeep Yadav dismissed Ravindra and Kane Williamson in the following overs leaving them on 75 off 3. Soon, Tom Latham was also cheaply dismissed by Ravindra Jadeja. Later, Daryl Mitchell stabilized the innings with 63 off 101 until being caught by Indian captain Rohit Sharma. As their innings got slowed but due to Michael Bracewell's 53* off 40 and Glenn Phillips's 34 they ended up scoring 251 runs off 7 wickets with Yadav and Chakravarthy taking 2 wickets each and Jadeja and Mohammed Shami taking 1 wicket each.

=== India's innings ===
Chasing a target of 252 runs in 50 overs, India completed the chase within 49 overs and thus winning by 4 wickets. The innings started well with openers, captain Rohit Sharma and Shubman Gill sharing a 105-run partnership before Gill was caught out for 31 by Glenn Phillips off the bowling of Mitchell Santner in the 19th over. Virat Kohli, coming in after Gill's wicket, was out early scoring a run of two balls, being dismissed cheaply by Michael Bracewell. Shreyas Iyer and Axar Patel anchored the middle order with Iyer scoring 48 off 62 balls before being dismissed by Santner, while Patel contributed 29 runs off 40 balls before being dismissed by Bracewell. KL Rahul remained unbeaten on 34 off 33 balls guiding India to victory alongside Hardik Pandya, who scored 18 off 18 balls before being dismissed by Kyle Jamieson. Ravindra Jadeja finished not out on 9 off 6 balls scoring the winning runs with an over to spare.

=== Match details ===
9 March 2025
13:00 UTC+4 (D/N)
Scorecard

New Zealand; 251/7 (50 overs)	v	India; 254/6 (49 overs)
Daryl Mitchell 63 (101); Kuldeep Yadav 2/40 (10 overs)		Rohit Sharma 76 (83); Michael Bracewell 2/28 (10 overs)

India won by 4 wickets
Dubai International Cricket Stadium, Dubai
Umpires: Richard Illingworth (Eng) and Paul Reiffel (Aus)
Player of the match: Rohit Sharma (Ind)

- New Zealand won the toss and elected to bat.
- Daryl Mitchell (NZ) completed 1,000 runs in ICC limited-over tournaments.
- Rohit Sharma (Ind) became the first captain to win the Player of the Match award in the final of the Champions Trophy.
- Rohit Sharma became the second Indian captain after MS Dhoni to win multiple ICC trophies.
- India won their record third Champions Trophy title after 2002 and 2013.

Match scorecard

1st innings

New Zealand batting
Player	Status	Runs	Balls	4s	6s	Strike rate
Will Young	lbw b Varun	15	23	2	0	65.21
Rachin Ravindra	b Kuldeep	37	29	4	1	127.58
Kane Williamson	c & b Kuldeep	11	14	1	0	78.57
Daryl Mitchell	c Rohit b Shami	63	101	3	0	62.37
Tom Latham	lbw b Jadeja	14	30	0	0	46.66
Glenn Phillips	b Varun	34	52	2	1	65.38
Michael Bracewell	not out	53	40	3	2	132.50
Mitchell Santner	run out (Kohli/†Rahul)	8	10	0	0	8.00
Nathan Smith	not out	0	1	0	0	0.00
Kyle Jamieson	did not bat					
Will O'Rourke	did not bat					
Extras	(lb 3, w 13)	16				
Total	(7 wickets; 50 overs)	251		15	4	RR: 5.02

Fall of wickets: 1/57 (Young, 7.5 ov), 2/69 (Ravindra, 10.1 ov), 3/75 (Williamson, 12.2 ov), 4/108 (Latham, 23.2 ov), 5/165 (Phillips, 37.5 ov), 6/211 (Mitchell, 45.4 ov), 7/239 (Santner, 49 ov)

India bowling
Bowler	Overs	Maidens	Runs	Wickets	Econ	Wides	NBs
Mohammed Shami	9	0	74	1	8.22	1	0
Hardik Pandya	3	0	30	0	10.00	3	0
Varun Chakravarthy	10	0	45	2	4.50	3	0
Kuldeep Yadav	10	0	40	2	4.00	1	0
Axar Patel	8	0	29	0	3.62	1	0
Ravindra Jadeja	10	0	30	1	3.00	0	0

2nd innings

India batting
Player	Status	Runs	Balls	4s	6s	Strike rate
Rohit Sharma	st †Latham b Ravindra	76	83	7	3	91.56
Shubman Gill	c Phillips b Santner	31	50	0	1	62.00
Virat Kohli	lbw b Bracewell	1	2	0	0	50.00
Shreyas Iyer	c Ravindra b Santner	48	62	2	2	77.41
Axar Patel	c O'Rourke b Bracewell	29	40	1	1	72.50
KL Rahul	not out	34	33	1	1	103.03
Hardik Pandya	c & b Jamieson	18	18	1	1	100.00
Ravindra Jadeja	not out	9	6	1	0	150.00
Kuldeep Yadav	did not bat					
Mohammed Shami	did not bat					
Varun Chakravarthy	did not bat					
Extras	(w 8)	8				
Total	(6 wickets; 49 overs)	254		13	9	RR: 5.18

Fall of wickets: 1/105 (Gill, 18.4 ov), 2/106 (Kohli, 19.1 ov), 3/122 (Rohit, 26.1 ov), 4/183 (Iyer, 38.4 ov), 5/203 (Patel, 41.3 ov), 6/241 (Pandya, 47.3 ov)

New Zealand bowling
Bowler	Overs	Maidens	Runs	Wickets	Econ	Wides	NBs
Kyle Jamieson	5	0	24	1	4.80	1	0
Will O'Rourke	7	0	56	0	8.00	3	0
Nathan Smith	2	0	22	0	11.00	0	0
Mitchell Santner	10	0	46	2	4.60	1	0
Rachin Ravindra	10	1	47	1	4.70	1	0
Michael Bracewell	10	1	28	2	2.80	0	0
Glenn Phillips	5	0	31	0	6.20	0	0

== Aftermath ==
=== Post-match ===
This was India's third ICC Champions Trophy title after 12 years, with their previous one being in 2013 and 2002. Rohit Sharma was later awarded with the Player of the Match award and he became the first captain to win the Player of the Match award in the final of ICC Champions Trophy. New Zealand's Rachin Ravindra was awarded with the Player of the Tournament award for his all-round performance throughout the tournament. This was also Gautam Gambhir’s first major title as the head coach of the Indian team, after taking charge in July 2024.

India received $2.365 million and New Zealand received $1.245 million as prize money from the ICC.

During the post-match presentation, four officials were part of the presentation ceremony, including Jay Shah, the ICC chair, BCCI president Roger Binny, BCCI secretary Devajit Saikia and NZC director Roger Twose, however controversy erupted over PCB's absence from the ceremony because representatives of the host board are among the dignitaries called to the podium to present the awards. Later, ICC clarified that they had invited PCB chairman Mohsin Naqvi for the final but as he was unavailable so he did not came to Dubai.

=== Reaction ===
Indian President Droupadi Murmu, Prime Minister Narendra Modi and several other cricketers and celebrities like Sachin Tendulkar, Yuvraj Singh, Suresh Raina, Dinesh Karthik, Ravichandran Ashwin and others congratulated team India on winning the tournament. However, several Australian and British press media labelled the victory as hollow and tainted because India played at a single venue as compared to New Zealand who had to travel to multiple venues throughout the tournament. However, these claims were met with strong rebuttals from various cricketers, analysts and fans.

=== Celebrations ===
After India's victory the BCCI announced a cash reward of ₹58 crore (US$67,18,662) for the players, coaching staff and support staff. Unlike 2024, the open bus parade celebration was not held due to players commitment to 2025 Indian Premier League and other logistical constraints.

== Broadcasting ==
The final match was broadcast live in India on Star Sports, free-to-air broadcaster DD Sports and free on OTT platform JioHotstar. In New Zealand the match was broadcast live on Sky Sport. The ICC also named the following panel of commentators for the final: Harsha Bhogle, Ian Bishop, Simon Doull, Aaron Finch, Sunil Gavaskar, Dinesh Karthik, Ramiz Raja, Ravi Shastri and Ian Smith.

=== Viewership ===
Disney+ Hotstar recorded a viewership of 61 million concurrent viewers, the most for any live sporting event on an OTT platform and thus, breaking the record of 2023 Cricket World Cup final. The match also became the second highest-rated ODI in TV history outside of World Cup matches, drawing 230 million viewers and accumulating 53 billion minutes of watch-time across television and digital platforms. With 65.3 billion live viewing minutes globally, it became the most viewed Champions Trophy match, overtaking the record of 2017 final by a whopping 52.1%.
