= 2025 Champions Trophy =

Ninth edition of the ICC Champions Trophy

2025 ICC Champions Trophy
- Dates: 19 February – 9 March 2025
- Administrator: International Cricket Council
- Cricket format: One Day International
- Tournament format(s): Round-robin and single-elimination
- Hosts: Pakistan; United Arab Emirates (Note: The official sole host for the tournament was Pakistan. Due to India's refusal to visit Pakistan, their matches were shifted to the United Arab Emirates.)
- Champions: India (3rd title)
- Runners-up: New Zealand
- Participants: 8
- Matches: 15
- Player of the series: (New Zealand) Rachin Ravindra
- Most runs: (New Zealand) Rachin Ravindra (263)
- Most wickets: (New Zealand) Matt Henry (10)
- Official website: icc-cricket.com

The 2025 ICC Champions Trophy was the ninth edition of the ICC Champions Trophy. It was hosted by Pakistan Cricket Board from 19 February to 9 March 2025 and featured 15 matches held across three venues in Pakistan; due to India's boycott of Pakistan, their matches were played in the United Arab Emirates.

The tournament was contested by the top eight ranked men's national teams qualified from the 2023 World Cup. Afghanistan made their debut appearance in the tournament.

Hosts Pakistan were the defending champions and were eliminated in the group stage. India became the champions by defeating New Zealand in the final and also became the first team to win three Champions Trophy titles.

== Background ==
The ICC Champions Trophy is a quadrennial ODI cricket tournament organised by the International Cricket Council (ICC). Initially held as a biennial tournament since its inaugural edition in 1998 as ICC KnockOut Trophy, it was rebranded as ICC Champions Trophy in 2002 and has been held as a quadrennial tournament since 2009. In 2016, the ICC cancelled future editions of the Champions Trophy after the 2017 tournament, aiming to have only one major tournament in each format of international cricket. However, in November 2021 as part of the 2024–2031 ICC men's hosts cycle, ICC announced that the tournament would return from 2025 onwards.

=== Host selection ===
Pakistan was announced as the host of the 2025 ICC Champions Trophy on 16 November 2021 as part of the 2024–2031 ICC men's hosts cycle. It is the first global tournament to be hosted by Pakistan after almost 29 years, since the 2009 attack on the Sri Lankan team. The last major tournament to take place in the country was the 1996 Cricket World Cup which it co-hosted with India and Sri Lanka. United Arab Emirates was announced as a neutral venue for the Indian Cricket Team matches due to India's refusal to play in Pakistan.

=== Format ===
The format of the competition had remained the same as it was since eight teams were introduced in the fray back in 2006. All eight teams were slotted into two groups of four, with each team playing once against every other team in the group. The top two teams from each group advanced to the knockout stage, featuring two semi-finals leading up to the final.

=== India's participation ===
The India–Pakistan cricket rivalry has been severely impacted by the tense political relations between the two nations. In November 2023, the Pakistan Cricket Board (PCB) met with the ICC Executive Board to discuss compensation if India refused to play in Pakistan. A year later, the Board of Control for Cricket in India (BCCI) informed the ICC that India wouldn't travel to Pakistan for the tournament, citing security concerns. Pakistan demanded a written explanation and initially rejected the proposed hybrid model.

==== Neutral venue arrangements ====
On 19 December 2024, following an agreement between BCCI and PCB, the ICC in an update issued on India and Pakistan hosted matches at ICC events, established that the ICC Champions Trophy 2025 will be played across Pakistan and a neutral venue. The ICC board confirmed that India and Pakistan matches hosted by either country at ICC events between 2024 and 2027 would be played at a neutral venue. The fixtures were announced on 24 December 2024, along with the Dubai International Cricket Stadium in Dubai, UAE as the neutral venue for the tournament.

=== Prize money ===
The ICC allocated a pool of US$6.9 million in prize money for the tournament, a 53 percent increase from the previous edition. The winners would receive the grand prize of $2.24 million, with each team receiving an additional $125,000 for participating.

Prize money allocation for the tournament
Place	Teams	Amount	
Place	Teams	per side	Total
Champions	1	$2.24 million	$2.24 million
Runners-up	1	$1.12 million	$1.12 million
Semi-finalists	2	$560,000	$1.12 million
5th–6th place (group stage)	2	$350,000	$700,000
7th–8th place (group stage)	2	$140,000	$280,000
Participants	8	$125,000	$1 million
Total	8	$6.9 million	

=== Marketing ===
On 13 November 2024, the ICC launched a new visual identity for the Champions Trophy with the release of a brand launch video, as the event returned for the first time since 2017. On 14 November 2024, The PCB announced the schedule for trophy tour in the region of Pakistan-administered Kashmir. The PCB's plan to take the trophy to cities in Pakistan-administered Kashmir was objected to by the BCCI. On 16 November 2024, the ICC officially announced the global trophy tour for the Champions Trophy starting in Islamabad, with the cities in Pakistan-administered Kashmir excluded. The silverware journeyed across the eight participating nations. The global trophy tour concluded with India in January, as the trophy went back to Pakistan.

On 30 January 2025, it was announced that a captains' event would not be held for the tournament. The official theme song for the tournament titled "Jeeto Baazi Khel Ke" produced by Abdullah Siddiqui and performed by Atif Aslam was released on 7 February 2025. On 12 February 2025, the ICC revealed Sarfaraz Ahmed, Shane Watson, Shikhar Dhawan and Tim Southee as the ambassadors for the tournament. On 16 February 2025, a curtain raiser event was held at Lahore Fort in Pakistan, to mark the commencement of the tournament. Three days later on 19 February 2025, the opening ceremony took place at the National Stadium, Karachi. The event featured an aerobatic display by the Pakistan Air Force's Sherdils Squadron with the President Asif Ali Zardari in attendance as the chief guest.

== Qualification ==
Pakistan qualified for the competition automatically as hosts and was joined by seven other highest-ranked teams from the 2023 Cricket World Cup group stage. This was the first time former champions Sri Lanka failed to qualify for the tournament, while Afghanistan made their debut appearance in the tournament.

Teams qualified for the tournament
Method of qualification	Date of qualification	Venues	No. of teams	Teams	Total times qualified	Last edition participated
Host	16 November 2021	—N/a	1	Pakistan	9	2017
2023 Cricket World Cup (Top 7 teams from the previous World Cup, excluding the host)	5 October – 19 November 2023	India	7	Afghanistan	1	—N/a
2023 Cricket World Cup (Top 7 teams from the previous World Cup, excluding the host)	5 October – 19 November 2023	India	7	Australia	9	2017
2023 Cricket World Cup (Top 7 teams from the previous World Cup, excluding the host)	5 October – 19 November 2023	India	7	Bangladesh	6	2017
2023 Cricket World Cup (Top 7 teams from the previous World Cup, excluding the host)	5 October – 19 November 2023	India	7	England	9	2017
2023 Cricket World Cup (Top 7 teams from the previous World Cup, excluding the host)	5 October – 19 November 2023	India	7	India	9	2017
2023 Cricket World Cup (Top 7 teams from the previous World Cup, excluding the host)	5 October – 19 November 2023	India	7	New Zealand	9	2017
2023 Cricket World Cup (Top 7 teams from the previous World Cup, excluding the host)	5 October – 19 November 2023	India	7	South Africa	9	2017
Total			8			

== Venues ==
In December 2022, the Pakistan Cricket Board was given approval by the Government of Pakistan for the construction of a new cricket stadium in Islamabad for the tournament. On 28 April 2024, three existing venues were proposed for the event by Pakistan. The matches are being hosted in Karachi, Lahore and Rawalpindi with India playing in Dubai.

Venues in Pakistan
A map of Pakistan with pin-points on 2025 Champions Trophy venues
Karachi	Lahore	Rawalpindi
National Stadium	Gaddafi Stadium	Rawalpindi Cricket Stadium
Capacity: 30,000	Capacity: 34,000	Capacity: 20,000
Matches: 3	Matches: 4 (Semi-final 2)	Matches: 3
National Stadium, Karachi in 2025	Gaddafi Stadium, Lahore in 2022	

Venues in United Arab Emirates
Dubai
Dubai International Cricket Stadium
Capacity: 25,000
Matches: 5 (Semi-final 1 & final)
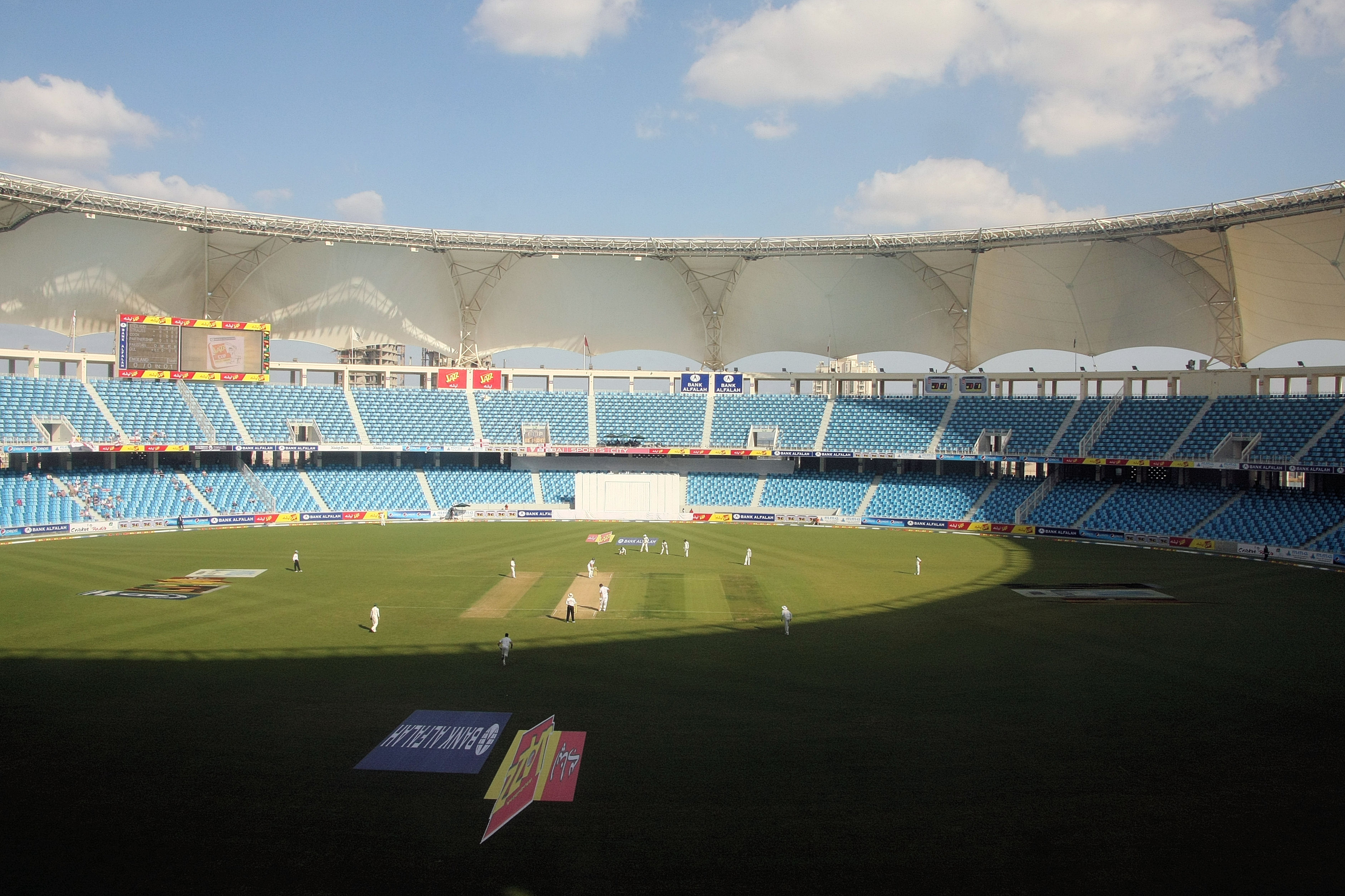

== Match officials ==
On 5 February 2025, ICC released the list of match referees and umpires for the tournament. On 10 February 2025, the match officials schedule for the group stage was released, and on 3 March 2025, the match officials for the two semi-finals had been confirmed. On 6 March 2025, the ICC announced the match officials for the final.

Match referees

- (Australia) David Boon
- (Sri Lanka) Ranjan Madugalle
- (Zimbabwe) Andy Pycroft

Umpires

- (Sri Lanka) Kumar Dharmasena
- (New Zealand) Chris Gaffaney
- (England) Michael Gough
- (South Africa) Adrian Holdstock
- (England) Richard Illingworth
- (England) Richard Kettleborough
- (Pakistan) Ahsan Raza
- (Australia) Paul Reiffel
- (Bangladesh) Sharfuddoula
- (Australia) Rod Tucker
- (England) Alex Wharf
- (Cricket West Indies) Joel Wilson

== Squads ==
Each team could select a squad of fifteen players for the tournament, with additional travelling reserves also able to be named. England became the first team to announce their squad on 22 December 2024. New Zealand, Bangladesh and Afghanistan announced their squads on 12 January 2025. Australia and South Africa announced their squads on 13 January. India announced their squad on 18 January 2025. Pakistan announced their squad on 31 January 2025. The final squads for each nation was announced on 13 February 2025. Several teams' missed their regular players originally part of the provisional squad, as they had been replaced as a result of late withdrawals due to injuries.

== Warm-up matches ==
The warm-up fixtures took place between 14 and 17 February in the lead-up to the main tournament. The PCB had named three Shaheens squads for the warm-up matches against Afghanistan, South Africa and Bangladesh, respectively, along with a fixture between Afghanistan and New Zealand.

Warm-up matches

Warm-up match 1
14 February 2025
14:00 UTC+5 (D/N)
Scorecard

Pakistan Shaheens; 314/8 (50 overs)	v	Afghanistan; 170 (38.4 overs)
Hussain Talat 70 (75); Fareed Ahmad 3/56 (8 overs)		Rahmat Shah 43 (53); Shadab Khan 3/29 (8 overs)

Pakistan Shaheens won by 144 runs
Gaddafi Stadium, Lahore
Umpires: Zulfiqar Jan (Pak) and Tariq Rasheed (Pak)

- Afghanistan won the toss and elected to field.

Warm-up match 2
16 February 2025
14:00 UTC+5 (D/N)
Scorecard

Afghanistan; 305/9 (50 overs)	v	New Zealand; 308/8 (47.5 overs)
Rahmanullah Gurbaz 110 (107); Mitchell Santner 2/34 (8 overs)		Devon Conway 66 (67); Rashid Khan 2/33 (7 overs)

New Zealand won by 2 wickets
National Stadium, Karachi
Umpires: Imtiaz Iqbal (Pak) and Asif Yaqoob (Pak)

- Afghanistan won the toss and elected to bat.

Warm-up match 3
17 February 2025
14:00 UTC+5 (D/N)
Scorecard

Pakistan Shaheens; 322/8 (50 overs)	v	South Africa; 324/7 (49 overs)
Mohammad Huraira 110 (114); Wiaan Mulder 3/27 (5 overs)		Rassie van der Dussen 62 (64); Mehran Mumtaz 2/45 (10 overs)

South Africa won by 3 wickets
National Stadium, Karachi
Umpires: Faisal Afridi (Pak) and Nasir Hussain (Pak)

- South Africa won the toss and elected to field.

Warm-up match 4
17 February 2025
13:00 UTC+4 (D/N)
Scorecard

Bangladesh; 202 (38.2 overs)	v	Pakistan Shaheens; 206/3 (34.5 overs)
Mehidy Hasan Miraz 44 (53); Usama Mir 4/43 (10 overs)		Mohammad Haris 76 (73); Nahid Rana 1/11 (2 overs)

Pakistan Shaheens won by 7 wickets
ICC Academy Ground, Dubai
Umpires: Akbar Ali (UAE) and Shiju Sam (UAE)

- Bangladesh won the toss and elected to bat.

== Group stage ==
The ICC announced the groups and their fixtures on 24 December 2024, with the group stage matches being played from 19 February to 2 March 2025. The eight teams were divided into two groups of four, with each team facing the other three teams in the group for a total of 12 matches. The opening match was played between hosts Pakistan and New Zealand on 19 February at the National Stadium, Karachi.

Following table lists teams in their initial group stage seedings.

Group stage
Group A	Group B
India; New Zealand; Pakistan; Bangladesh	South Africa; Australia; Afghanistan; England

- Source: International Cricket Council

=== Group A ===
Pos	Team	Pld	W	L	NR	Pts	NRR	Qualification
1	India	3	3	0	0	6	0.715	Advanced to the knockout stage
2	New Zealand	3	2	1	0	4	0.267	Advanced to the knockout stage
3	Bangladesh	3	0	2	1	1	−0.443	Eliminated
4	Pakistan (H)	3	0	2	1	1	−1.087	Eliminated

Source: ESPNcricinfo
Rules for classification: 1) Points; 2) Wins; 3) Net run rate; 4) Results of games between tied teams; 5) Initial group stage seedings
(H) Host

==== New Zealand vs Pakistan ====
19 February 2025
14:00 UTC+5 (D/N)
Scorecard

New Zealand; 320/5 (50 overs)	v	Pakistan; 260 (47.2 overs)
Tom Latham 118* (104); Naseem Shah 2/63 (10 overs)		Khushdil Shah 69 (49); Will O'Rourke 3/47 (9 overs)

New Zealand won by 60 runs
National Stadium, Karachi
Umpires: Richard Kettleborough (Eng) and Sharfuddoula (Ban)
Player of the match: Tom Latham (NZ)

- Pakistan won the toss and elected to field.
- Will Young (NZ) became the fourth New Zealand batter to score a century in the Champions Trophy and the first Kiwi to score a ton in his debut game of the tournament.
- Points: New Zealand 2, Pakistan 0.

==== Bangladesh vs India ====
20 February 2025
13:00 UTC+4 (D/N)
Scorecard

Bangladesh; 228 (49.4 overs)	v	India; 231/4 (46.3 overs)
Tawhid Hridoy 100 (118); Mohammed Shami 5/53 (10 overs)		Shubman Gill 101* (129); Rishad Hossain 2/38 (10 overs)

India won by 6 wickets
Dubai International Cricket Stadium, Dubai
Umpires: Adrian Holdstock (SA) and Paul Reiffel (Aus)
Player of the match: Shubman Gill (Ind)

- Bangladesh won the toss and elected to bat.
- Ravindra Jadeja (Ind) played in his 200th ODI match.
- Mohammed Shami (Ind) took his 200th wicket in ODIs. He became the joint second-fastest man to take 200 ODI wickets, in terms of matches played and the fastest to 200 by balls bowled.
- Shami also took his 60th wicket in an ICC ODI tournament: the most by an Indian bowler, moving past Zaheer Khan.
- The 154-run partnership between Jaker Ali and Tawhid Hridoy was Bangladesh's highest for the 6th wicket in ODIs breaking the record of Mahmudullah and Jaker Ali.
- Tawhid Hridoy (Ban) scored his maiden century in ODIs.
- Rohit Sharma (Ind) completed 11,000 runs in ODIs, becoming the fourth Indian batter to do so. He became the second-quickest to reach 11,000 runs in 261 innings, after Virat Kohli.
- Rohit Sharma (Ind) reached 100 wins as an international captain.
- Points: India 2, Bangladesh 0.

==== India vs Pakistan ====
23 February 2025
13:00 UTC+4 (D/N)
Scorecard

Pakistan; 241 (49.4 overs)	v	India; 244/4 (42.3 overs)
Saud Shakeel 62 (76); Kuldeep Yadav 3/40 (9 overs)		Virat Kohli 100* (111); Shaheen Shah Afridi 2/74 (8 overs)

India won by 6 wickets
Dubai International Cricket Stadium, Dubai
Umpires: Richard Illingworth (Eng) and Paul Reiffel (Aus)
Player of the match: Virat Kohli (Ind)

- Pakistan won the toss and elected to bat.
- Virat Kohli (Ind) took his 158th catch, the most for India in ODIs, going past Mohammad Azharuddin (156).
- Virat Kohli (Ind) completed 14,000 runs in 287 innings in ODIs, becoming the fastest player to do so, going past Sachin Tendulkar's 350 innings. He also became the third-highest run-scorer (27,503 runs) in international cricket, surpassing Ricky Ponting.
- Virat Kohli (Ind) scored an unbeaten 100, marking his 51st century in One Day Internationals. His century brought his tally of 50+ scores in ICC ODI events to 23, equaling Sachin Tendulkar's record. At 36 years and 110 days old, he became the oldest player to record a century in the ICC Champions Trophy.
- Points: India 2, Pakistan 0.

==== Bangladesh vs New Zealand ====
24 February 2025
14:00 UTC+5 (D/N)
Scorecard

Bangladesh; 236/9 (50 overs)	v	New Zealand; 240/5 (46.1 overs)
Najmul Hossain Shanto 77 (110); Michael Bracewell 4/26 (10 overs)		Rachin Ravindra 112 (105); Taskin Ahmed 1/28 (7 overs)

New Zealand won by 5 wickets
Rawalpindi Cricket Stadium, Rawalpindi
Umpires: Kumar Dharmasena (SL) and Ahsan Raza (Pak)
Player of the match: Michael Bracewell (NZ)

- New Zealand won the toss and elected to field.
- Michael Bracewell (NZ) delivered his best ODI bowling figures (4/26 in 10 overs). This feat set a new record for the best bowling figures by a New Zealand spinner in Champions Trophy history, surpassing Paul Wiseman's 4/45.
- Kane Williamson (NZ) surpassed Stephen Fleming as New Zealand's highest run-scorer in ICC ODI tournaments.
- Rachin Ravindra (NZ) completed 1,000 runs in ODIs in 26 innings. He became the fifth-fastest New Zealand batter to reach this milestone.
- Rachin Ravindra (NZ) became the first New Zealand batter to score 4 centuries in ICC ODI events.
- Rachin Ravindra (NZ) scored his Fourth ODI century. He became the first Kiwi batter to score a century on his Champions Trophy debut
- Glenn Phillips (NZ) completed 1,000 runs in ODIs.
- Points: New Zealand 2, Bangladesh 0.
- As a result of this match, India and New Zealand qualified for the semi-finals and Pakistan and Bangladesh were eliminated.

==== Bangladesh vs Pakistan ====
27 February 2025
14:00 UTC+5 (D/N)
Scorecard

Pakistan	v	Bangladesh

Match abandoned
Rawalpindi Cricket Stadium, Rawalpindi
Umpires: Michael Gough (Eng) and Adrian Holdstock (SA)

- No toss.
- No play was possible due to rain.
- Points: Bangladesh 1, Pakistan 1.

==== India vs New Zealand ====
2 March 2025
13:00 UTC+4 (D/N)
Scorecard

India; 249/9 (50 overs)	v	New Zealand; 205 (45.3 overs)
Shreyas Iyer 79 (98); Matt Henry 5/42 (8 overs)		Kane Williamson 81 (120); Varun Chakravarthy 5/42 (10 overs)

India won by 44 runs
Dubai International Cricket Stadium, Dubai
Umpires: Michael Gough (Eng) and Richard Illingworth (Eng)
Player of the match: Varun Chakravarthy (Ind)

- New Zealand won the toss and elected to field.
- Virat Kohli (Ind) played in his 300th ODI match.
- Varun Chakravarthy (Ind) took his maiden five-wicket haul in ODIs and became the third Indian to do so in the Champions Trophy.
- Points: India 2, New Zealand 0.

=== Group B ===
Pos	Team	Pld	W	L	NR	Pts	NRR	Qualification
1	South Africa	3	2	0	1	5	2.395	Advanced to the knockout stage
2	Australia	3	1	0	2	4	0.475	Advanced to the knockout stage
3	Afghanistan	3	1	1	1	3	−0.990	Eliminated
4	England	3	0	3	0	0	−1.159	Eliminated

Source: ESPNcricinfo
Rules for classification: 1) Points; 2) Wins; 3) Net run rate; 4) Results of games between tied teams; 5) Initial group stage seedings

==== Afghanistan vs South Africa ====
21 February 2025
14:00 UTC+5 (D/N)
Scorecard

South Africa; 315/6 (50 overs)	v	Afghanistan; 208 (43.3 overs)
Ryan Rickelton 103 (106); Mohammad Nabi 2/51 (10 overs)		Rahmat Shah 90 (92); Kagiso Rabada 3/36 (8.3 overs)

South Africa won by 107 runs
National Stadium, Karachi
Umpires: Sharfuddoula (Ban) and Alex Wharf (Eng)
Player of the match: Ryan Rickelton (SA)

- South Africa won the toss and elected to bat.
- This was Afghanistan's first ODI in the Champions Trophy.
- Ryan Rickelton (SA) scored his maiden century in ODIs. He became the first South African to score a hundred on his Champions Trophy debut.
- Points: South Africa 2, Afghanistan 0.

==== Australia vs England ====
22 February 2025
14:00 UTC+5 (D/N)
Scorecard

England; 351/8 (50 overs)	v	Australia; 356/5 (47.3 overs)
Ben Duckett 165 (143); Ben Dwarshuis 3/66 (10 overs)		Josh Inglis 120* (86); Adil Rashid 1/47 (10 overs)

Australia won by 5 wickets
Gaddafi Stadium, Lahore
Umpires: Ahsan Raza (Pak) and Joel Wilson (WI)
Player of the match: Josh Inglis (Aus)

- Australia won the toss and elected to field.
- Ben Duckett (Eng) scored his third ODI century. He became the first England batter to score a century on his Champions Trophy debut.
- Duckett also made the highest individual score by a player in ICC Champions Trophy history, breaking Nathan Astle’s record (145* vs USA in 2004).
- Australia broke the record for the highest team total in history of ICC Champions Trophy, breaking England's record set during the same match, however it was again broken by New Zealand in the second semi-final.
- Josh Inglis (Aus) scored his maiden century in ODIs.
- Inglis' century was the fastest-ever in the Champions Trophy.
- This was the highest successful run chase in any ICC ODI event.
- This was the highest match aggregate in history of ICC Champions Trophy (707/13).
- Points: Australia 2, England 0.

==== Australia vs South Africa ====
25 February 2025
14:00 UTC+5 (D/N)
Scorecard

Australia	v	South Africa

Match abandoned
Rawalpindi Cricket Stadium, Rawalpindi
Umpires: Chris Gaffaney (NZ) and Richard Kettleborough (Eng)

- No toss.
- No play was possible due to rain.
- Points: Australia 1, South Africa 1.

==== Afghanistan vs England ====
26 February 2025
14:00 UTC+5 (D/N)
Scorecard

Afghanistan; 325/7 (50 overs)	v	England; 317 (49.5 overs)
Ibrahim Zadran 177 (146); Jofra Archer 3/64 (10 overs)		Joe Root 120 (111); Azmatullah Omarzai 5/58 (9.5 overs)

Afghanistan won by 8 runs
Gaddafi Stadium, Lahore
Umpires: Rod Tucker (Aus) and Joel Wilson (WI)
Player of the match: Ibrahim Zadran (Afg)

- Afghanistan won the toss and elected to bat.
- Jofra Archer (Eng) took his 50th wicket in ODIs. He became the fastest English bowler to take 50 wickets in just 30 matches, surpassing James Anderson.
- Ibrahim Zadran (Afg) was the first Afghan batsman to score a century in ICC Champions Trophy.
- Zadran also made the highest individual score (177) by a player in ICC Champions Trophy history, breaking Ben Duckett's record set four days earlier. He also scored the highest individual score by an Afghan batter in ODIs, breaking his own record (162).
- Afghanistan registered their highest total in ICC ODI tournaments, bettering 291/5 against Australia in the 2023 Cricket World Cup.
- Ben Duckett (Eng) became the joint-fastest English batter to complete 1000 runs in ODIs, achieving the milestone in 21 innings.
- Joe Root's (Eng) century was the 11th century of this edition of the Champions Trophy, breaking the record for the most centuries in a single edition (10 each in 2002 and 2017).
- Azmatullah Omarzai (Afg) took his maiden five-wicket haul in ODIs.
- Points: Afghanistan 2, England 0.
- As a result of this match, England were eliminated from the tournament.

==== Afghanistan vs Australia ====
28 February 2025
14:00 UTC+5 (D/N)
Scorecard

Afghanistan; 273 (50 overs)	v	Australia; 109/1 (12.5 overs)
Sediqullah Atal 85 (95); Ben Dwarshuis 3/47 (9 overs)		Travis Head 59* (40); Azmatullah Omarzai 1/43 (5 overs)

No result
Gaddafi Stadium, Lahore
Umpires: Kumar Dharmasena (SL) and Alex Wharf (Eng)

- Afghanistan won the toss and elected to bat.
- No further play was possible due to rain.
- Azmatullah Omarzai (Afg) completed 1,000 runs in ODIs.
- Australia broke the previous record for the fastest team fifty in Champions Trophy history by reaching the milestone in just 29 balls.
- Points: Afghanistan 1, Australia 1.
- As a result of this match, Australia qualified for the semi-finals of the tournament.

==== England vs South Africa ====
1 March 2025
14:00 UTC+5 (D/N)
Scorecard

England; 179 (38.2 overs)	v	South Africa; 181/3 (29.1 overs)
Joe Root 37 (44); Wiaan Mulder 3/25 (7.2 overs)		Rassie van der Dussen 72* (87); Jofra Archer 2/55 (9 overs)

South Africa won by 7 wickets
National Stadium, Karachi
Umpires: Ahsan Raza (Pak) and Rod Tucker (Aus)
Player of the match: Marco Jansen (SA)

- England won the toss and elected to bat.
- Lungi Ngidi (SA) took his 100th ODI wicket.
- Points: South Africa 2, England 0.
- As a result of this match, South Africa qualified for the semi-finals while Afghanistan were eliminated from the tournament.

== Knockout stage ==
The knockout stage consisted of two semi-finals and a final. The first semi-final was held on 4 March in Dubai (due to India's boycott of Pakistan), and the second semi-final in Lahore on 5 March. The final was held in Dubai on 9 March. The final had been due to be played in Lahore but the ICC had stated that if India qualified for the final, it would instead be played in Dubai. Both the semi-finals and the final had reserve days. If a reserve day were to come into play, the match would not be restarted but instead resumed from the previous day's play, if there was any.

- In case a semi-final ended in a tie, the winner would be decided by a Super Over. If the result was not possible in a semi-final (including reserve day), the team finishing higher in its group stage would advance to the final.
- If a final ended in a tie, the winner will be decided by a Super Over. If the result was not possible in the final (including reserve day), the teams would be declared as joint winners.

Both India and New Zealand, after winning each of their first two matches, simultaneously qualified for the semi-finals from Group A on 24 February, when New Zealand completed their second win of the tournament in their match against Bangladesh at Rawalpindi. Australia, after winning their first match and their second match getting abandoned, qualified for the semi-finals on 28 February, when their match against Afghanistan at Lahore ended with no result due to rain. South Africa, after winning their first match and their second match getting abandoned, qualified for the semi-finals on 1 March, when they won group B's last match against England at Karachi.

The match-ups for semi-finals were confirmed on 2 March 2025 after India defeated New Zealand in the last match of the group stage at Dubai. India and New Zealand ranked first and second at the points table in Group A and qualified as A1 and A2 with 6 and 4 points respectively. South Africa and Australia, ranked first and second at the points table in Group B, qualified as B1 and B2 with 5 and 4 points respectively. India (A1) played Australia (B2) in the first semi-final on 4 March in Dubai, and New Zealand (A2) played South Africa (B1) in the second semi-final on 5 March in Lahore.

=== Bracket ===
Semi-finals
A1	India	267/6 (48.1 overs)
B2	Australia	264 (49.3 overs)
B1	South Africa	312/9 (50 overs)
A2	New Zealand	362/6 (50 overs)

Final
SF1W	India	254/6 (49 overs)
SF2W	New Zealand	251/7 (50 overs)

=== Semi-finals ===
==== Australia vs India ====
4 March 2025
13:00 UTC+4 (D/N)
Scorecard

Australia; 264 (49.3 overs)	v	India; 267/6 (48.1 overs)
Steve Smith 73 (96); Mohammed Shami 3/48 (10 overs)		Virat Kohli 84 (98); Nathan Ellis 2/49 (10 overs)

India won by 4 wickets
Dubai International Cricket Stadium, Dubai
Umpires: Chris Gaffaney (NZ) and Richard Illingworth (Eng)
Player of the match: Virat Kohli (Ind)

- Australia won the toss and elected to bat.
- Rohit Sharma (Ind) surpassed Chris Gayle for the most sixes in ICC ODI events.
- Kohli became India's highest run-getter in Champions Trophy, surpassing Shikhar Dhawan's 701 runs.
- Kohli became the first ever cricketer to score 1,000 runs and 10 fifty-plus scores in ICC knockout matches.
- KL Rahul (Ind) completed 3,000 runs in 77 innings in ODIs.
- India qualified for the third consecutive final in Champions Trophy.
- Rohit Sharma (Ind) became the first captain to reach the final in all four ICC men's tournaments.
- Steve Smith and Glenn Maxwell (Aus) both played their last ODI match.
- India surpassed Australia with 14 ICC final appearances, the most in history.

==== New Zealand vs South Africa ====
5 March 2025
14:00 UTC+5 (D/N)
Scorecard

New Zealand; 362/6 (50 overs)	v	South Africa; 312/9 (50 overs)
Rachin Ravindra 108 (101); Lungi Ngidi 3/72 (10 overs)		David Miller 100* (67); Mitchell Santner 3/43 (10 overs)

New Zealand won by 50 runs
Gaddafi Stadium, Lahore
Umpires: Kumar Dharmasena (SL) and Paul Reiffel (Aus)
Player of the match: Rachin Ravindra (NZ)

- New Zealand won the toss and elected to bat.
- Kane Williamson (NZ) became New Zealand's highest run-scorer in the Champions Trophy.
- This was the highest team total in history of Champions Trophy.
- David Miller (SA) scored the fastest century in Champions Trophy history.
- This was the first instance of three individual centuries in a ICC Champions Trophy match.
- Heinrich Klaasen (SA) played in his last ODI match.

=== Final ===
9 March 2025
13:00 UTC+4 (D/N)
Scorecard

New Zealand; 251/7 (50 overs)	v	India; 254/6 (49 overs)
Daryl Mitchell 63 (101); Kuldeep Yadav 2/40 (10 overs)		Rohit Sharma 76 (83); Michael Bracewell 2/28 (10 overs)

India won by 4 wickets
Dubai International Cricket Stadium, Dubai
Umpires: Richard Illingworth (Eng) and Paul Reiffel (Aus)
Player of the match: Rohit Sharma (Ind)

- New Zealand won the toss and elected to bat.
- Daryl Mitchell (NZ) completed 1,000 runs in ICC limited-over tournaments.
- Rohit Sharma (Ind) became the first captain to win the Player of the Match award in the final of the Champions Trophy.
- Rohit Sharma became the second Indian captain after MS Dhoni to win multiple ICC trophies.
- India won their record third Champions Trophy title after 2002 and 2013.

== Statistics ==
=== Most runs ===
Player	Mat	Inns	Runs	Ave	HS
(New Zealand) Rachin Ravindra	4	4	263	65.75	112
(India) Shreyas Iyer	5	5	243	48.60	79
(England) Ben Duckett	3	3	227	75.66	165
(England) Joe Root	3	3	225	75.00	120
(India) Virat Kohli	5	5	218	54.50	100*
Source: ESPN Cricinfo

=== Most wickets ===
Player	Mat	Inns	Wkts	Ave	Econ	BBI
(New Zealand) Matt Henry	4	4	10	16.70	5.32	5/42
(India) Varun Chakravarthy	3	3	9	15.11	4.53	5/42
(India) Mohammed Shami	5	5	9	25.88	5.68	5/53
(New Zealand) Mitchell Santner	5	5	9	26.66	4.80	3/43
(New Zealand) Michael Bracewell	5	5	8	25.12	4.10	4/26
Source: ESPN Cricinfo

=== Team of the tournament ===
On 10 March 2025, the ICC announced its team of the tournament with Rachin Ravindra being named as player of the tournament for his all round performance throughout the tournament and Mitchell Santner as the captain of the team.

Player	Role
(New Zealand) Rachin Ravindra	Opening batter
(Afghanistan) Ibrahim Zadran	Opening batter
(India) Virat Kohli	Batter
(India) Shreyas Iyer	Batter
(India) KL Rahul	Wicket-keeper
(New Zealand) Glenn Phillips	All-rounder
(Afghanistan) Azmatullah Omarzai	All-rounder
(New Zealand) Mitchell Santner	Bowler (captain)
(India) Mohammed Shami	Bowler
(New Zealand) Matt Henry	Bowler
(India) Varun Chakravarthy	Bowler
(India) Axar Patel	Twelfth man

== Controversies ==
- Pakistan's name was omitted in the Champions Trophy branding during the live broadcast of the match between India and Bangladesh in Dubai. The logo in the top left corner of the broadcast carried the event name - Champions Trophy 2025 - but not the name of Pakistan, the hosts, for the entirety of the match. The PCB wrote to ICC asking for an explanation over the omission, however, the ICC maintained that the incident occurred due to a technical glitch and had clarified that this issue would not affect any future games, regardless of whether they were played in Pakistan or the UAE.
- After the tournament final, four officials were part of the presentation ceremony, including Jay Shah, the ICC chair, BCCI president Roger Binny, BCCI secretary Devajit Saikia and NZC director Roger Twose; yet none from PCB. However, it was not customary for representatives of nations playing the final to feature in post-tournament ICC ceremonies, unless the final involves the host country. PCB asked ICC for an explanation, after the Champions Trophy tournament director Sumair Ahmed was not included in the post-final presentation ceremony in Dubai. Sumair, who was also the chief operating officer of the PCB, was in Dubai for the final in his capacity as tournament director and Pakistan's representative at the final. The PCB chairman, Mohsin Naqvi was originally meant to be part of the presentations but the PCB said he was unwell and unable to travel to Dubai, and it was expected that Sumair was to stand in as Pakistan's representative. PCB was aggrieved that no ICC representative reached out to the board at any stage during the final to discuss plans for a Pakistani presence on the podium post the final.

== Broadcasting ==
The Star Sports network managed the global broadcasting rights as part of their deal with the ICC. The tournament was live streamed on ICC.tv worldwide except for in Bangladesh, Bhutan, India, Maldives, Myanmar and Pakistan. Additionally, it was also available on following platforms in their respective regions:

Broadcasters for the tournament
Region	Country/Sub-region	Broadcasting licensee(s)	Broadcasting platforms	Radio
Africa	Middle East and North Africa	E&	CricLife Max; StarzPlay	—N/a
Africa	Sub-Saharan Africa	SuperSport	SS Cricket; DStv	—N/a
Americas	Canada	Willow	Willow TV; Cricbuzz	—N/a
Americas	Caribbean Islands	ESPN	ESPN Caribbean; ESPN Play	—N/a
Americas	United States	Willow	Willow TV; Cricbuzz	—N/a
Asia	Afghanistan	ATN	Ariana TV	—N/a
Asia	Bangladesh	TSM	T Sports and Nagorik TV; Toffee	Radio Shadhin and Radio Bhumi
Asia	India	Disney Star	Star Sports and TV18; JioHotstar	All India Radio
Asia	Pakistan	PTV	PTV Sports	Hum FM
Asia	Pakistan	Ten Sports	Ten Sports	Hum FM
Asia	Singapore	StarHub	Hub Sports	—N/a
Asia	Sri Lanka	Maharaja TV	TV 1	Lakhanda radio
Asia	United Arab Emirates	—N/a		Talk 100.3FM and Big 106.2
Europe	Ireland	Sky Sports	Sky Sports Cricket	—N/a
Europe	Netherlands	NOS	NOS	—N/a
Europe	United Kingdom	Sky Sports	Sky Sports Cricket; Sky Go	BBC Radio 5 Sports Extra
Oceania	Australia	Amazon	Prime Video	—N/a
Oceania	New Zealand	Sky TV NZ	Sky Sport	—N/a
Oceania	Papua New Guinea	PNG Digicel	TVWan	—N/a

=== Viewership ===
The ICC projected that global live viewing minutes of the tournament had increased by 19% over 2017 and due to this it became the most viewed Champions Trophy ever.

=== Commentators ===
The commentary panel for the tournament was announced on 18 February 2025.

- Wasim Akram
- Michael Atherton
- Harsha Bhogle
- Ian Bishop
- Simon Doull
- Sunil Gavaskar
- Aaron Finch
- Matthew Hayden
- Nasser Hussain
- Mel Jones
- Dinesh Karthik
- Athar Ali Khan
- Bazid Khan
- Katey Martin
- Pommie Mbangwa
- Kass Naidoo
- Shaun Pollock
- Ramiz Raja
- Ravi Shastri
- Ian Smith
- Dale Steyn
- Ian Ward
