= 2000 KnockOut Trophy final =

2000 ICC KnockOut Trophy Final
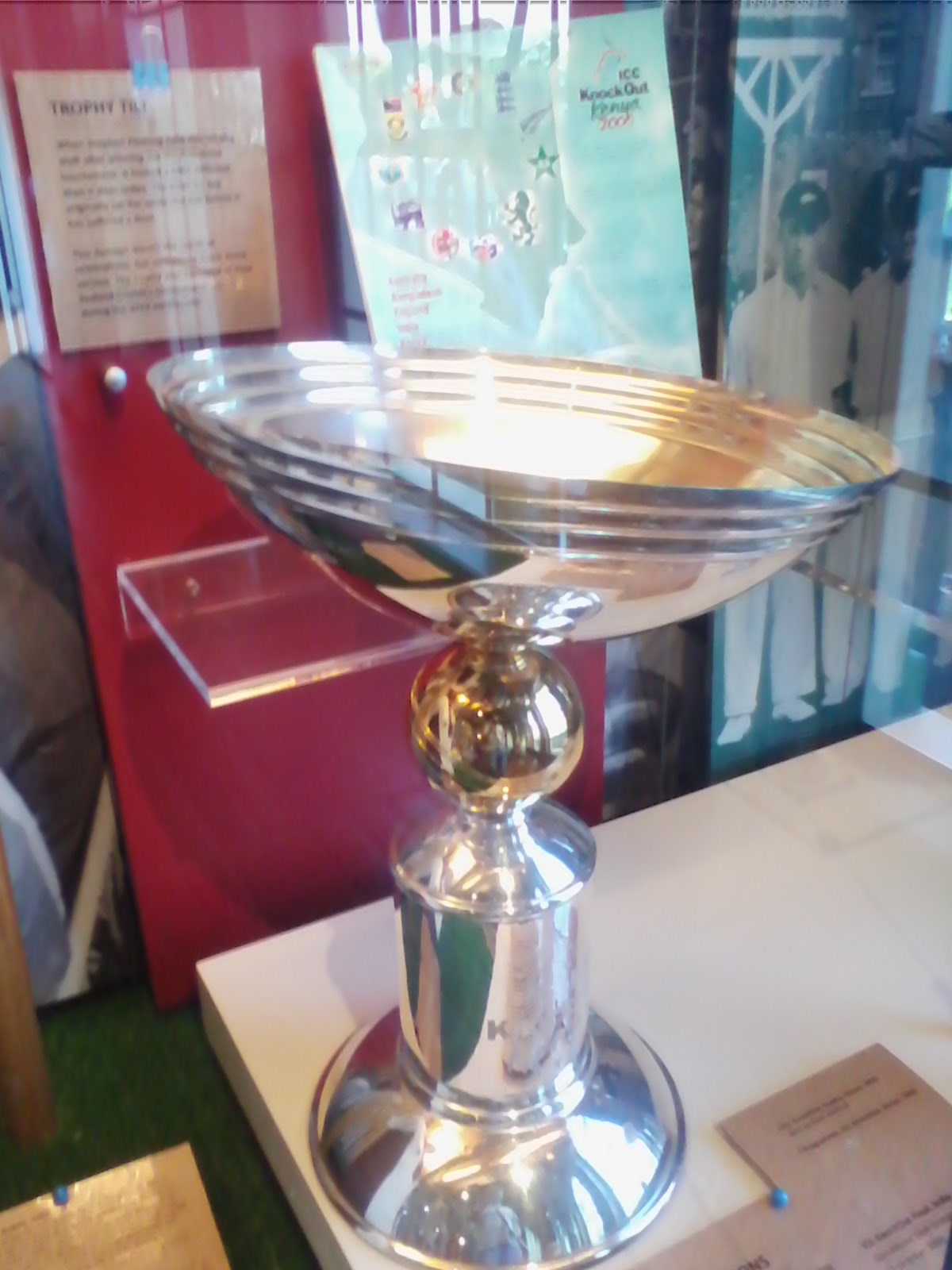
- The KnockOut Trophy at the New Zealand Cricket Museum in Wellington
India	New Zealand
(India)	(New Zealand)
264/6	265/6
50 overs	49.4 overs
- New Zealand won by 4 wickets
- Date: 15 October 2000
- Venue: Gymkhana Club Ground, Nairobi
- Player of the match: Chris Cairns (NZ)
- Umpires: Steve Bucknor (WI) and David Shepherd (Eng)
- Attendance: 7000

The final of the 2000 ICC KnockOut Trophy took place on 15 October 2000 at the Gymkhana Club Ground in Nairobi, Kenya. It was played between India and New Zealand. New Zealand won the final by four wickets to win their first ICC KnockOut Trophy and thus also winning a major ICC event. Chris Cairns was named the man of the match for scoring 102 runs.

== Road to the final ==
=== Knockout stage ===
A total of 10 matches were played in the tournament. The top 5 teams ranked according to 1999 Cricket World Cup seedings qualify for the knockout stage automatically. The remaining three teams qualify from the pre-quarter-finals, which was held from 3 to 5 October, between 6 of the lowest ranked teams according to 1999 Cricket World Cup seedings. Australia, Pakistan, South Africa, New Zealand and Zimbabwe qualified for the knockout stage automatically, while India, Sri Lanka and England qualified from the pre-quarter-finals, beating Kenya, West Indies and Bangladesh respectively. India faced Australia, Sri Lanka faced Pakistan and England faced South Africa in the quarter-finals. India, Pakistan, New Zealand and South Africa defeated Australia, Sri Lanka, Zimbabwe and England respectively in the quarter-finals, and qualified for the semi-finals.

=== Semi-finals ===
The first Semi-final was played between New Zealand and Pakistan on 11 October 2000 at Gymkhana Club Ground, Nairobi, Kenya. Pakistan, who had won the toss, elected to bat first. Pakistan were bowled out for 252. Saeed Anwar scored 104 runs from 115 balls. Shayne O'Connor take a five-wicket haul his match figures were (5/46) bowling 9.2 overs, which help the New Zealand team to bowl out Pakistan for such mediocre score. New Zealand innings did start well losing their 2 wickets for 15, but Roger Twose and Craig McMillan steady the innings and put a brilliant partnership of 135 runs facing 158 balls and thus, they achieved the target with an over and 4 wickets remaining. Shayne O'Connor was awarded Man of the Match for his match figures (5/46) and New Zealand entered in their first ever Finals at major ICC events.

India played South Africa in the second Semi-final of the tournament on 13 October 2000 at Gymkhana Club Ground, Nairobi, Kenya. India captain, Sourav Ganguly won the toss and decided to bat first. Indian openers gave them a steady start, with 66 for no wicket in 14 overs. Sourav Ganguly scored a brilliant century scoring 141 runs facing 142 balls he was not out throughout the innings and India scored the mammoth total of 295 runs losing 6 wickets. South African openers could not give their team a good start as both Kirsten and Hall were back in the pavilion for just the score of 23 in 4 overs and soon they were reduced to 50/4 then Jonty Rhodes, Mark Boucher and Lance Klusener steadied the innings for some extent but that could not help too much as they were bowled out for 200 and lost the match by 95 runs. Sourav Ganguly was named the Man of the Match for his brilliant knock of 141 runs.

== Match details ==
=== Match officials ===
- On-field umpires: Steve Bucknor (WI) and David Shepherd (Eng)
- TV umpire: Darrell Hair (Aus)
- Match referee: Ranjan Madugalle (SL)

=== Summary ===
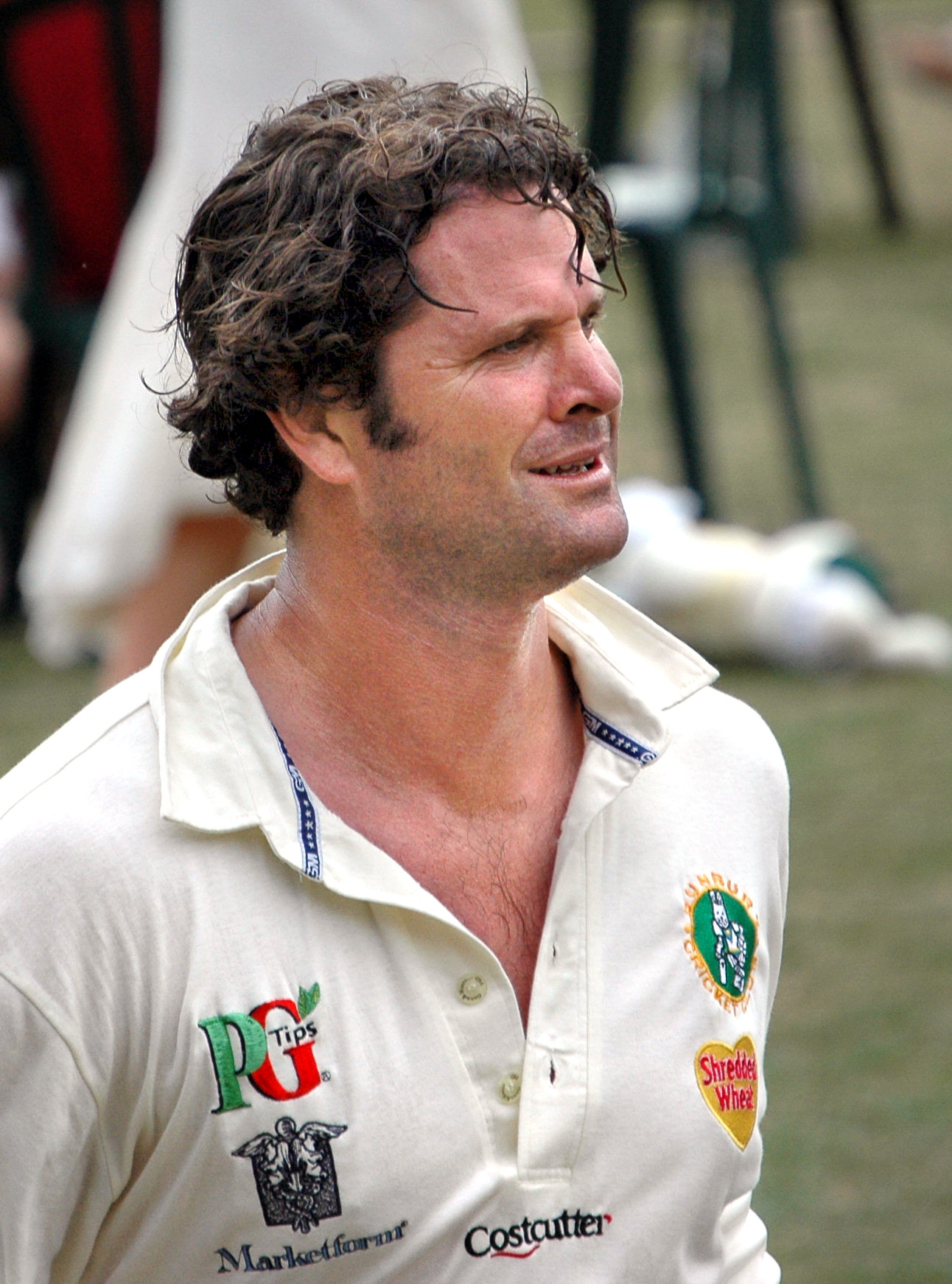
Chris Cairns scored 102 runs not out from 113 balls.

New Zealand won the toss and elected to field. Indian openers gave a superb start to their team, and put a brilliant partnership of 141 and scoring the runs at the run rate of over 5 runs per over, but then, their middle could not take any advantage of the start given by their openers and finished the innings scoring 264 runs and losing 6 wickets in their allotted 50 overs. Sourav Ganguly's golden run in the tournament continued as he yet again scored a brilliant century scoring 117 runs from 130 balls. New Zealand innings yet again did not start well as they lost their 2 wickets inside 6 overs for the score of 37, and later reduced to 132/5 but then, Chris Cairns and Chris Harris put a brilliant partnership of 122 runs which help them to win their first major ICC event and also their first ICC KnockOut Trophy title.

15 October
Scorecard

India; 264/6 (50 overs)	v	New Zealand; 265/6 (49.4 overs)
Sourav Ganguly 117 (130); Scott Styris 2/53 (10 overs)		Chris Cairns 102* (113); Venkatesh Prasad 3/27 (7 overs)

New Zealand won by 4 wickets
Gymkhana Club Ground, Nairobi
Umpires: Steve Bucknor (WI) and David Shepherd (Eng)
Player of the match: Chris Cairns (NZ)

- New Zealand won the toss and elected to field.
- This was New Zealand's first major ICC event win.

== Scorecard ==
India batting
Player	Status	Runs	Balls	4s	6s	Strike rate
Sourav Ganguly *	c Harris b Astle	117	130	9	4	90.00
Sachin Tendulkar	run out (Styris/Astle)	69	83	10	1	83.13
Rahul Dravid	run out (Styris/Allott)	22	35	1	0	62.85
Yuvraj Singh	c Twose b Styris	18	19	2	0	94.73
Vinod Kambli	c O'Connor b Styris	1	5	0	0	20.00
Robin Singh	c Spearman b Allott	13	11	1	0	118.18
Ajit Agarkar	not out	15	17	0	0	88.23
Vijay Dahiya †	not out	1	2	0	0	50.00
Anil Kumble	did not bat					
Zaheer Khan	did not bat					
Venkatesh Prasad	did not bat					
Extras	(lb 2, nb 2, w 4)	8				
Total	(6 wickets; 50 overs)	264		23	5	

Fall of wickets: 1/141 (Tendulkar, 26.3 ov), 2/202 (Dravid, 38.6 ov), 3/220 (Ganguly, 42.3 ov), 4/229 (Kambli, 43.4 ov), 5/237 (Yuvraj, 45.3 ov), 6/256 (Robin, 48.4 ov)

New Zealand bowling
Bowler	Overs	Maidens	Runs	Wickets	Econ	Wides	NBs
Geoff Allott	10	0	54	1	5.40	2	1
Shayne O'Connor	5	0	37	0	7.40	1	0
Chris Cairns	10	2	40	0	4.00	1	0
Scott Styris	10	0	53	2	5.30	0	1
Nathan Astle	10	0	46	1	4.60	0	0
Chris Harris	5	0	32	0	6.40	0	0

New Zealand batting
Player	Status	Runs	Balls	4s	6s	Strike rate
Craig Spearman	c Yuvraj b Prasad	3	8	0	0	37.50
Nathan Astle	c Robin b Kumble	37	48	5	0	77.08
Stephen Fleming *	lbw b Prasad	5	11	0	0	45.45
Roger Twose	st †Dahiya b Kumble	31	35	4	0	88.57
Chris Cairns	not out	102	113	8	2	90.26
Craig McMillan	c Ganguly b Tendulkar	15	14	2	0	107.14
Chris Harris	c Robin b Prasad	46	72	4	0	63.88
Adam Parore †	not out	3	4	0	0	75.00
Scott Styris						
Shayne O'Connor						
Geoff Allott						
Extras	(lb 15, nb 7, w 1)	23				
Total	(6 wickets; 49.4 overs)	265		23	2	

Fall of wickets: 1/6 (Spearman, 1.5 ov), 2/37 (Fleming, 5.4 ov), 3/82 (Astle, 14.6 ov), 4/109 (Twose, 18.5 ov), 5/132 (McMillan, 23.2 ov), 6/254 (Harris, 48.3 ov)

India bowling
Bowler	Overs	Maidens	Runs	Wickets	Econ	Wides	NBs
Zaheer Khan	7	0	54	0	7.71	0	6
Venkatesh Prasad	7	0	27	3	3.85	1	0
Ajit Agarkar	6.4	0	44	0	6.60	0	0
Anil Kumble	9	0	55	2	6.11	0	0
Sachin Tendulkar	10	1	38	1	3.80	0	0
Yuvraj Singh	10	0	32	0	3.20	0	1

Key

- * – Captain
- † – Wicket-keeper
- c Fielder – Indicates that the batsman was dismissed by a catch by the named fielder
- b Bowler – Indicates which bowler gains credit for the dismissal
