= Richard Illingworth =

Cricket umpire

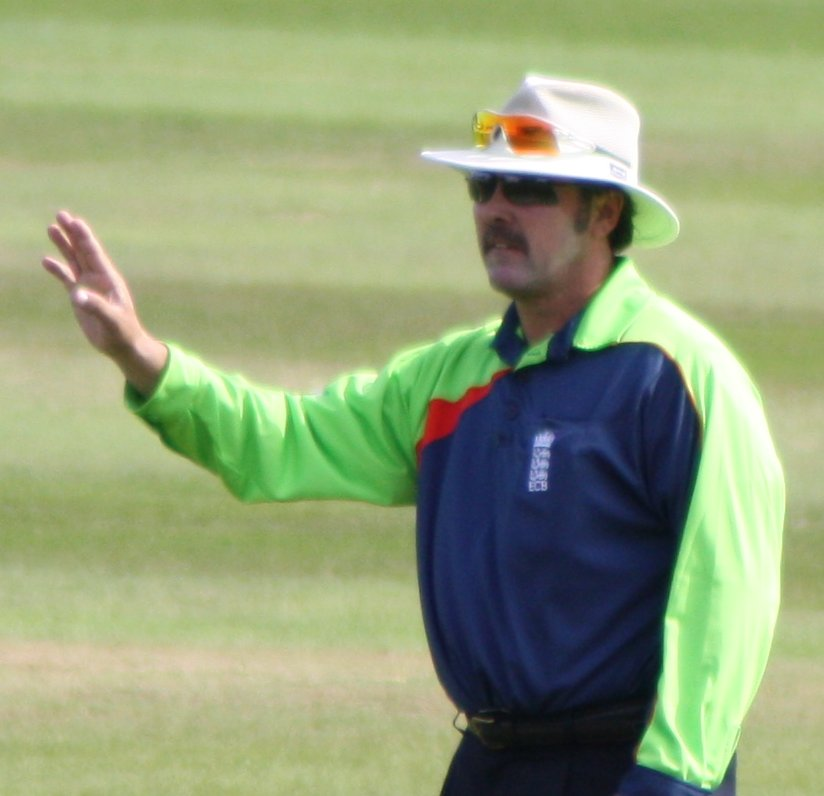

Personal information
- Full name: Richard Keith Illingworth
- Born: 23 August 1963 (age 63); Bradford, West Riding of Yorkshire, England
- Batting: Right-handed
- Bowling: Slow left–arm orthodox
- Role: Umpire, Bowler

International information
- National side: England (1991–1996)
- Test debut (cap 551): 4 July 1991 v West Indies
- Last Test: 26 December 1995 v South Africa
- ODI debut (cap 113): 23 May 1991 v West Indies
- Last ODI: 9 March 1996 v Sri Lanka

Domestic team information
- Years: Team
- 1982–2000: Worcestershire
- 1988/89: Natal
- 2001: Derbyshire

Umpiring information
- Tests umpired: 82 (2012–2025)
- ODIs umpired: 106 (2010–2026)
- T20Is umpired: 43 (2010–2026)
- WTests umpired: 1 (2005)
- WODIs umpired: 6 (2003–2008)
- WT20Is umpired: 13 (2011–2016)

Career statistics
Competition	Test	ODI	FC	LA
Matches	9	25	376	381
Runs scored	128	68	7,027	1,458
Batting average	18.28	11.33	22.45	14.87
100s/50s	0/0	0/0	4/21	0/1
Top score	28	14	120*	53*
Balls bowled	1,485	1,501	65,868	16,918
Wickets	19	30	831	412
Bowling average	32.36	35.29	31.54	27.08
5 wickets in innings	0	0	27	2
10 wickets in match	0	0	6	0
Best bowling	4/96	3/33	7/50	5/24
Catches/stumpings	5/–	8/–	161/–	93/–
Medal record
Men's Cricket
Representing England
ICC Cricket World Cup
Runner-up	1992 Australia and New Zealand
- Source: Cricinfo, 23 November 2023

Richard Keith Illingworth (born 23 August 1963) is an English former cricketer, who is currently an umpire. The bulk of his domestic cricketing career was with Worcestershire, although he had a spell with Derbyshire, and overseas with Natal. He played in nine Tests and twenty-five ODIs for England, including participating in the 1992 and 1996 Cricket World Cups. He was a part of the English squad which finished as runners-up at the 1992 Cricket World Cup.

== Playing career ==
Playing mainly as a left-arm spinner, Illingworth made his first-class debut in 1982, promoted to the Worcestershire first team after just two Second XI appearances and taking 3–61 against Somerset. His figures that year were fairly modest; eighteen first-class wickets cost him over 45 runs apiece, and he bowled just eight overs in one-day cricket; but Worcestershire saw potential and persevered. By 1983, he was a first-team regular, taking forty-eight first-class wickets, a figure he improved on (with 57) the following year. He did play one season (1988/89) in the South African Currie Cup for Natal, but otherwise played only English domestic cricket.

For most of his twenty-season county cricket career, Illingworth remained with Worcestershire. Perhaps the highlights of his county career came when the county won the County Championship in 1988 and 1989. After he failed to win a contract extension in 2000, the last two years of his time in the first-class game were spent with Derbyshire. He finished with 831 wickets at an average of 31.54, and more than 7,000 runs at 22.45, including four first-class centuries.

=== One-Day International career ===
In 1990, Illingworth had his most productive year, taking 75 wickets at a bowling average of 28.29, and he went on that winter's A team tour to Pakistan and Sri Lanka. The following season, a well-timed burst of 5–49 against Northants in a May Sunday League game helped him win selection for the 1991 Texaco Trophy One Day International series against West Indies a few days later. He played a crucial part in the match, allowing the tourists just 20 runs from his ten overs for the wicket of Jeff Dujon, and then putting on an unbroken partnership of 23 with Mike Atherton as England recorded a thrilling one-wicket victory.

Illingworth went onto play for England in two Cricket World Cups, in 1992 and 1996. During the 1992 World Cup, Illingworth played in the final, giving away 50 runs in his 10 overs for the wicket of Javed Miandad, and also catching Imran Khan at long-on. In the same match, he had the misfortune of being the last man dismissed as England fell short in the final for the third time.

=== Test career ===
Although his performances in the other two Texaco Trophy matches of 1991 were less impressive, he did take the wickets of Richie Richardson and a young Brian Lara in the seven-wicket win at Lord's, and also held a catch off Phil DeFreitas to remove captain Viv Richards. Illingworth missed out on selection for the first two Test matches that year, but was selected for the Third Test at Trent Bridge, and took the wicket of Phil Simmons with his first ball in Test cricket, the first bowler since Intikhab Alam in 1959/60 to achieve this feat, and only the eleventh of all time. He also bowled Richards on his way to 3–110, but two stubborn rearguard displays with the bat (adding 42 with Robin Smith in the first innings and 38 with DeFreitas in the second) could not prevent England sliding to a nine-wicket loss.

Illingworth retained his place for the Fourth Test at Edgbaston, batting at number 11; this match was notable for the fact that all eleven England players had a first-class century to their name. Despite this, England were easily beaten, Illingworth going for almost five runs an over and picking up just one wicket in the match. He was dropped for The Oval, and replaced by Phil Tufnell. Tufnell took 6–25 in the first innings of that match to help propel England to a series-levelling win. Illingworth did not to play another Test until 1995, although he retained his one-day place for a couple of years, and did well in the 1992 World Cup.

By 1995, Illingworth had been out of the England side for two years, but the selectors were impressed by his reliable performances for his county, and called him up for the Test series against West Indies. He played in all but the Fourth Test (for which he was replaced by John Emburey), and the Sixth Test (for which he was incapacitated by injury). He won plaudits in this series for joining Mike Watkinson in a last-wicket stand in the Fifth Test which helped to ensure a drawn Test (and ultimately a drawn series), in spite of an injured finger. Christopher Martin-Jenkins praised "Illingworth's courageous defiance of doctor's orders". Although his series bowling figures of 6–215 were not particularly outstanding, he was selected for the winter tour to South Africa. It proved a good choice: Illingworth had his best series for England, taking nine Test wickets at an average of under 21. He also appeared four times in the 1996 World Cup, but thereafter the selectors' preference turned decisively to Tufnell, and Illingworth never played international cricket again.

== Umpiring career ==
Illingworth umpiring a Test match between New Zealand and India in November 2026

Illingworth was appointed to the ECB full list of first-class umpires for the 2006 English cricket season. As at the end of the 2008 English cricket season Illingworth had umpired 47 first-class matches, it was confirmed that he, and Richard Kettleborough, were promoted onto the ICC International list on 9 November 2009. Richard Illingworth joined ICC's elite umpire panel on 25 June 2013.

He was selected as one of the twenty umpires to stand in matches during the 2015 Cricket World Cup. In April 2019, he was named as one of the sixteen umpires to stand in matches during the 2019 Cricket World Cup. In July 2019, he was named as one of the two on-field umpires for the first semi-final match, between India and New Zealand. He was declared as the ICC Umpire of the year for four times in 2019, 2022, 2023 and 2024. With this, he is the only umpire on the elite panel right now who has won the prestigious award four times. He is the second-highest umpire of all time to receive the award four times with the legendary Simon Taufel being the first having received the award five times in a row.

In January 2021, Illingworth was named as one of the umpires for the Test matches between Bangladesh and the West Indies, the first time since the start of the COVID-19 pandemic that a neutral umpire was named for a Test series. In June 2021, Illingworth was named as one of the on-field umpires for the 2021 ICC World Test Championship Final. He also officiated at the 2023 WTC final at the Oval.

He was named as one of the match officials for 2023 Cricket World Cup. He was also named on-field umpires for the final, and become the second person after Sri Lanka's Kumar Dharmasena to feature in the final of the World Cup as both a player, having played in the 1992 Cricket World Cup Final, and an umpire. Later, he was also appointed as on-field umpire for the 2024 Men's T20 World Cup final and 2025 ICC Champions Trophy final.

== See also ==
- List of Test cricket umpires
- List of One Day International cricket umpires
- List of Twenty20 International cricket umpires
