= 2013 Champions Trophy final =

2013 ICC Champions Trophy Final
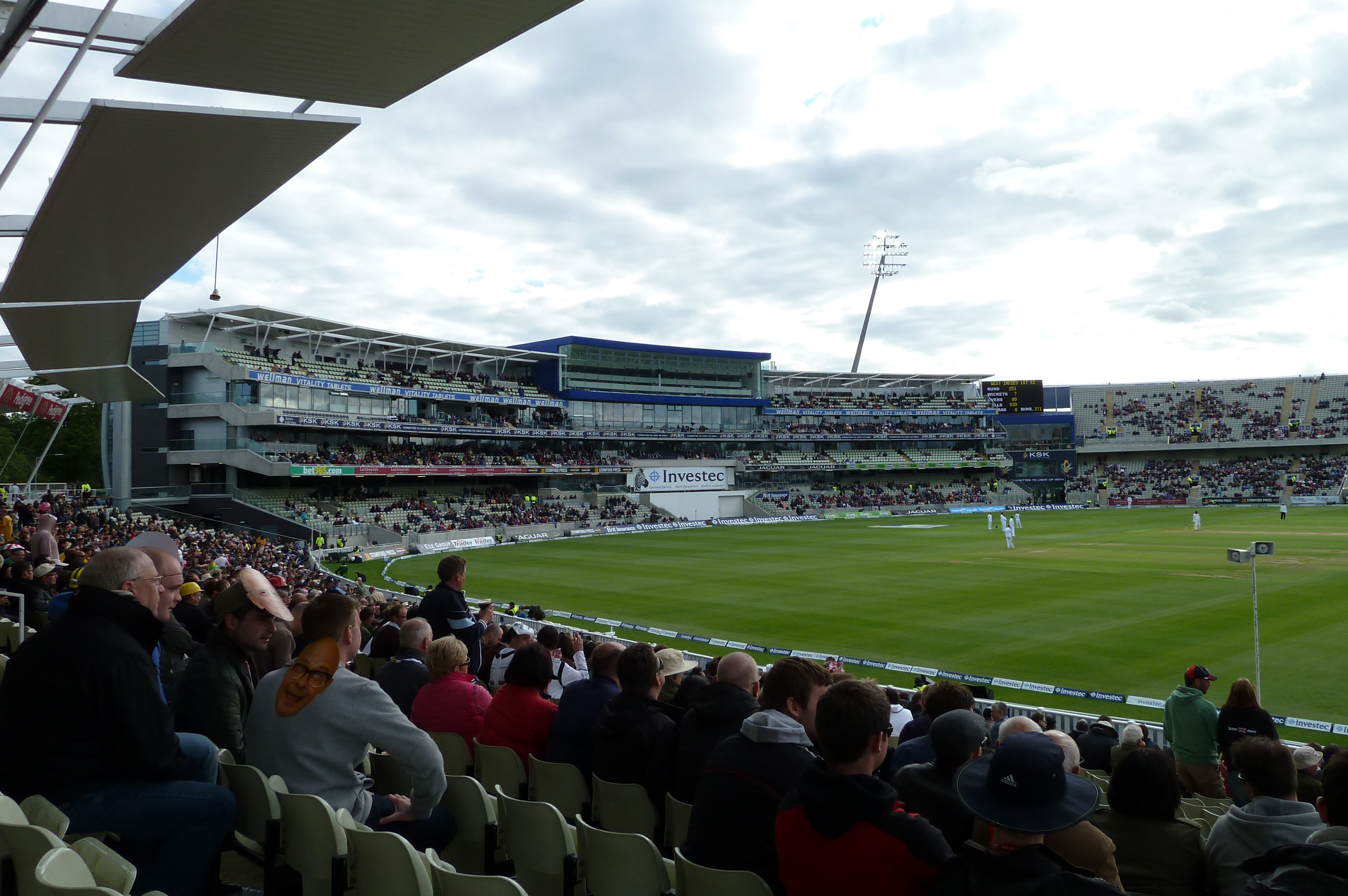
- The Final was held in Edgbaston located in Birmingham
- Event: 2013 ICC Champions Trophy
India	England
(India)	(England)
129/7	124/8
20	20
- India won by 5 runs
- Date: 23 June 2013
- Venue: Edgbaston, Birmingham
- Player of the match: Ravindra Jadeja (Ind)
- Umpires: Kumar Dharmasena (SL) and Rod Tucker (Aus)
- Attendance: 24,867

The final of the 2013 ICC Champions Trophy was played on 23 June 2013 between England and India at the Edgbaston Cricket Ground in Birmingham. This was the 7th edition of the ICC Champions Trophy. India won the match by 5 runs. England qualified for the final by defeating South Africa in the first semi-final at The Oval, London on 19 June 2013. India made their way into the final after defeating Sri Lanka in the second semi-final played at SWALEC Stadium, Cardiff on 20 June 2013. The match was delayed almost six hours due to rain and started at 16:20 local time, and it was reduced to 20 overs per innings. So all the rules of this match were same as a Twenty20 game. It was India's second title victory after the 2002 ICC Champions Trophy, although the first time they had shared the honour with Sri Lanka. So this was the first time that India won the title individually. In addition India became the second team after Australia to win the ICC Champions Trophy more than one time. Ravindra Jadeja earned the Man of the Match award for scoring 33 runs and taking 2 wickets in the match. Shikhar Dhawan was named the Man of the Series for scoring 363 runs in the tournament.

As a result of this match, MS Dhoni became the first captain to win the ICC T20 World Cup (2007), Cricket World Cup (2011) and ICC Champions Trophy (2013).

== Background ==
Prior to this match England and India had played 86 times against each other in ODIs, where India had the upper hand with 46 wins whereas England won in 35 matches. 2 matches were tied and 3 matches ended in No Result. Their latest meeting had resulted a six wicket win for England in a bilateral series in India in 2013.

These teams had met thrice in ICC Champions Trophy history, where India had won all three games.

== Road to the final ==
=== India ===
India had dominated the tournament from the first match to semi final match. They beat South Africa, West Indies and Pakistan in assertive wins to be the group champions of Group B. They brought their strong performance in the semi-final match too where they beat Sri Lanka by 8 wickets to reach the final for the third time after 2000 and 2002. 2 centuries & 1 half century from Shikhar Dhawan powered the Indian batting line up. Ravindra Jadeja was the leader from the front of the Indian bowling line-up. India didn't lose a single match since the start of the tournament with winning both of their warm-up matches against Sri Lanka and Australia.

=== England ===
England's qualified for the semi-finals as the group champions of Group A In the very first match of their tournament they won against Australia by 48 runs but lost to Sri Lanka in the next match. But they beat New Zealand in the last match to qualify for the semi-final. In the semi-final they beat South Africa with Jonathan Trott scoring an unbeaten 82 run innings, England won the match by 7 wickets. It was the second time after 2004 that England made the final.

== Match details ==
=== Match officials ===
Kumar Dharmasena from Sri Lanka and Rod Tucker from Australia were named as the on-field umpires. They had both previously officiated in the semi-final match of England and South Africa. Bruce Oxenford of Australia was appointed as TV umpire while Aleem Dar of Pakistan, who also officiated in the semi-final as an on-field umpire, was appointed as the reserve umpire. Ranjan Madugalle of Sri Lanka was the match referee, completing the five-member match official team.

- On-field umpires: Kumar Dharmasena (SL) and Rod Tucker (Aus)
- TV umpire: Bruce Oxenford (Aus)
- Reserve umpire: Aleem Dar (Pak)
- Match referee: Ranjan Madugalle (SL)

=== Toss ===
England's captain Alastair Cook won the toss and elected to field. India remained unchanged from the side that played the semi-final, while England brought Tim Bresnan in place of Steven Finn. However, the match was delayed almost six hours due to rain and was reduced to 20 overs per innings. So all the rules of this match were the same as a Twenty20 game.

=== India's innings ===
India lost their first wicket early as Rohit Sharma was bowled by Stuart Broad for 9 runs. Shikhar Dhawan continued to strike despite couple of rain delays. Soon, Ravi Bopara dismissed Dhawan thanks to a well-judged catch by James Tredwell at extra cover. Two overs later, Tredwell dismissed Dinesh Karthik, and Bopara bowled a maiden over next. Both Suresh Raina and MS Dhoni were dismissed cheaply by Bopara leaving India on 66 for five. Ravindra Jadeja joined Kohli in the middle, and the duo tried to stabilize the innings. With India on the back foot due to lower run rate, Cook reintroduced in-form bowler Anderson, who conceded only a single. Kohli took charge and smashed 2 boundaries to Bopara and a six to Broad while Jadeja managed to hit six to Anderson in the next over. Later while attempting a big hit to Anderson's bowl, Kohli was caught by Bopara at long-off for 43 runs. Ashwin came in with nine balls remaining, but was run out in the last over. However, Jadeja, with a six to Bresnan, added 12 runs in the over and took India to 129 runs. Bopara was the best bowler for England as he picked up 3 wickets for 20 runs in 4 overs while Anderson, Tredwell and Broad each took one wicket.

=== England's innings ===
England also lost their first wicket early in the second over as Alastair Cook edged to Umesh Yadav in the slips. Jonathan Trott joined Ian Bell as the duo managed to score 25 runs. Ashwin managed to dismiss Trott and Joe Root while Jadeja sent back Bell in the next over leaving England on 46 off 4 wickets. With spinners getting wickets, Dhoni gave the ball to Raina but failed to break the partnership of Eoin Morgan and Ravi Bopara. The duo made a partnership of 64 off 59 but the match turned in the 18th over when Ishant Sharma got the wickets of Morgan and Bopara in two consecutive balls as England were 110 for six. England needed 19 off 12 balls as Jos Buttler and Tim Bresnan came to bat but soon Jadeja bowled Buttler and Bresnan was run out. Broad and Tredwell came to the crease as 15 runs were required in the last over which was bowled by Ashwin. Broad managed to score a boundary on the second ball and the duo were able to score five runs in the next three balls as England needed 6 runs off the last ball. Tredwell failed to connect on the last ball as India won the match by five runs. Ashwin, Jadeja, Ishant Sharma each got two wickets while Umesh Yadav got one wicket.

23 June
10:30
Scorecard

India; 129/7 (20 overs)	v	England; 124/8 (20 overs)
Virat Kohli 43 (34); Ravi Bopara 3/20 (4 overs)		Eoin Morgan 33 (30); Ravichandran Ashwin 2/15 (4 overs)

India won by 5 runs
Edgbaston, Birmingham
Umpires: Kumar Dharmasena (SL) and Rod Tucker (Aus)
Player of the match: Ravindra Jadeja (Ind)

- England won the toss and elected to field.
- The match was reduced to 20 overs per side due to rain.
- MS Dhoni (Ind) became the first captain to win ICC T20 World Cup (2007), Cricket World Cup (2011) and ICC Champions Trophy (2013).

=== Scorecard ===
1st innings

India batting
Player	Status	Runs	Balls	4s	6s	Strike rate
Rohit Sharma	b Broad	9	14	1	0	64.28
Shikhar Dhawan	c Tredwell b Bopara	31	24	2	1	129.16
Virat Kohli	c Bopara b Anderson	43	34	4	1	126.47
Dinesh Karthik	c Morgan b Tredwell	6	11	0	0	54.54
Suresh Raina	c Cook b Bopara	1	6	0	0	16.66
MS Dhoni *†	c Tredwell b Bopara	0	4	0	0	0.00
Ravindra Jadeja	not out	33	25	2	2	132.00
Ravichandran Ashwin	run out (Bell)	1	1	0	0	100.00
Bhuvneshwar Kumar	not out	1	1	0	0	100.00
Ishant Sharma						
Umesh Yadav						
Extras	(w 4)	4				
Total	(7 wickets; 20 overs)	129		9	4	

Fall of wickets: 1/19 (Rohit, 3.5 ov), 2/50 (Dhawan, 8.2 ov), 3/64 (Karthik, 11.1 ov), 4/66 (Raina, 12.2 ov), 5/66 (Dhoni, 12.6 ov), 6/113 (Kohli, 18.3 ov), 7/119 (Ashwin, 19.2 ov)

England bowling
Bowler	Overs	Maidens	Runs	Wickets	Econ	Wides	NBs
James Anderson	4	0	24	1	6.00	0	0
Stuart Broad	4	0	26	1	6.50	0	0
Tim Bresnan	4	0	34	0	8.50	3	0
James Tredwell	4	0	25	1	6.25	0	0
Ravi Bopara	4	1	20	3	5.00	1	0

2nd innings

England batting
Player	Status	Runs	Balls	4s	6s	Strike rate
Alastair Cook *	c Ashwin b Yadav	2	9	0	0	22.22
Ian Bell	st †Dhoni b Jadeja	13	16	1	0	81.25
Jonathan Trott	st †Dhoni b Ashwin	20	17	2	0	117.64
Joe Root	c I Sharma b Ashwin	7	9	0	0	77.77
Eoin Morgan	c Ashwin b I Sharma	33	30	3	1	110.00
Ravi Bopara	c Ashwin b I Sharma	30	25	0	2	120.00
Jos Buttler †	b Jadeja	0	1	0	0	0.00
Tim Bresnan	run out (Rohit/†Dhoni)	2	4	0	0	50.00
Stuart Broad	not out	7	5	1	0	140.00
James Tredwell	not out	5	4	0	0	125.00
James Anderson	did not bat					
Extras	(lb 1, w 4)	5				
Total	(8 wickets; 20 overs)	124		7	3	

Fall of wickets: 1/3 (Cook, 1.5 ov), 2/28 (Trott, 5.1 ov), 3/40 (Root, 7.4 ov), 4/46 (Bell, 8.4 ov), 5/110 (Morgan, 17.3 ov), 6/110 (Bopara, 17.4 ov), 7/112 (Buttler, 18.2 ov), 8/113 (Bresnan, 18.4 ov)

India bowling
Bowler	Overs	Maidens	Runs	Wickets	Econ	Wides	NBs
Bhuvneshwar Kumar	3	0	19	0	6.33	0	0
Umesh Yadav	2	0	10	1	5.00	0	0
Ravindra Jadeja	4	0	24	2	6.00	0	0
Ravichandran Ashwin	4	1	15	2	3.75	2	0
Ishant Sharma	4	0	36	2	9.00	2	0
Suresh Raina	3	0	19	0	6.33	0	0

Key

- * – Captain
- † – Wicket-keeper
- c Fielder – Indicates that the batsman was dismissed by a catch by the named fielder
- b Bowler – Indicates which bowler gains credit for the dismissal

== Aftermath ==
After India's victory the BCCI announced a cash reward of ₹1 crore (US$100,000) for each player. Besides this, each member of the support staff also received ₹30 lakh (US$31,000) each. India further received $2 million as the prize money for winning the tournament from ICC. This was also India's last ICC tournament victory until the 2024 ICC Men's T20 World Cup.
