= 2002 Champions Trophy final =

2002 ICC Champions Trophy Final
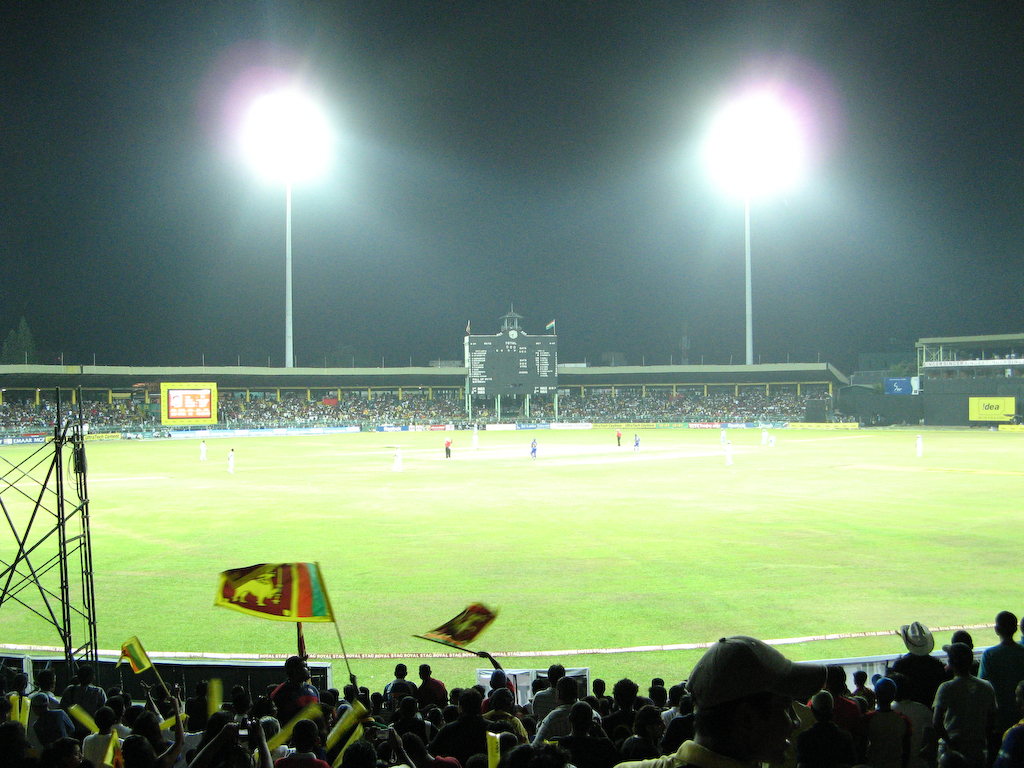
- The final was washed out due to continuous rain in Colombo. Even the reserve day couldn't help.
- Event: 2002 ICC Champions Trophy
Sri Lanka	India
(Sri Lanka)	(India)
244/5 & 222/7	14/0 & 38/1
50 & 50	2 & 8.4
- India and Sri Lanka declared co-champions.
- Date: 29 & 30 September 2002
- Venue: R. Premadasa Stadium, Colombo
- Player of the match: Not awarded
- Umpires: Steve Bucknor (WI) and David Shepherd (Eng)
- Attendance: 34,832

The final of the 2002 ICC Champions Trophy was rained-out twice, on 29 and 30 September 2002 at the R. Premadasa Stadium, Colombo. The final was scheduled to be played between Sri Lanka cricket team and the India cricket team on 29 September 2002. Sri Lanka batted first and scored 244 runs for five wickets in 50 overs. India had played only two overs before the match was stopped by the rain.

On 30 September, the Sri Lankan team again batted first and scored 222 runs for seven wickets. The match was abandoned as India reached 38 runs in 8.4 overs. Man of the Match and Man of the Series were not awarded, and both the teams were declared as joint winners.

== Background ==
=== First Semi-final ===
The first semi-final was played between India and South Africa on 25 September 2002. After winning the toss, India decided to bat first and score 261 runs for nine wickets in 50 overs. Sehwag scored 59 runs from 58 balls, including 10 fours; Yuvraj Singh and Rahul Dravid scored 62 and 49 runs respectively. Shaun Pollock took three wickets for 43 runs in nine overs. Chasing the target of 262, South Africa collapsed after reaching 192 runs for one wicket with Herschelle Gibbs scoring 116 and Jacques Kallis 97 runs in 37 overs. Gibbs could not continue his inning due to heat exhaustion. Sehwag got three wickets for 25 runs in five overs. India won the match by 10 runs and qualified for the final of the tournament.

25 September 2002
Scorecard

India; 261/9 (50 overs)	v	South Africa; 251/6 (50 overs)
Yuvraj Singh 62 (72); Shaun Pollock 3/43 (9 overs)		Herschelle Gibbs 116 (119); Virender Sehwag 3/25 (5 overs)

India won by 10 runs
R. Premadasa Stadium, Colombo
Umpires: David Shepherd (Eng) and Russell Tiffin (Zim)
Player of the match: Virender Sehwag (Ind)

- India won the toss and elected to bat.
- Robin Peterson (SA) made his ODI debut.

=== Second Semi-final ===
The second semi-final was played between Sri Lanka and Australia on 27 September 2002. Australia won the toss, decided to bat first and score 162 runs in 48.4 overs. Shane Warne scored 36 runs followed by Adam Gilchrist and Damien Martyn scoring 31 and 28 runs respectively. Muttiah Muralitharan took three wickets for 26 runs in 9.4 overs. Aravinda de Silva, who was awarded Man of the Match, conceded just 16 runs in 10 overs and took Matthew Hayden's wicket. Sri Lanka, in the reply, reached the target in 40 overs losing only three wickets. Marvan Atapattu scored 51 runs followed by Kumar Sangakkara's 48 and Jayasuriya's 42 runs. Glenn McGrath took two wickets for 41 runs in 10 overs.

27 September 2002
Scorecard

Australia; 162 (48.4 overs)	v	Sri Lanka; 163/3 (40 overs)
Shane Warne 36 (69); Muttiah Muralitharan 3/26 (9.4 overs)		Marvan Atapattu 51 (113); Glenn McGrath 2/41 (10 overs)

Sri Lanka won by 7 wickets
R. Premadasa Stadium, Colombo
Umpires: Steve Bucknor (WI) and Dave Orchard (SA)
Player of the match: Aravinda de Silva (Sri)

- Australia won the toss and elected to bat.

== Match details ==
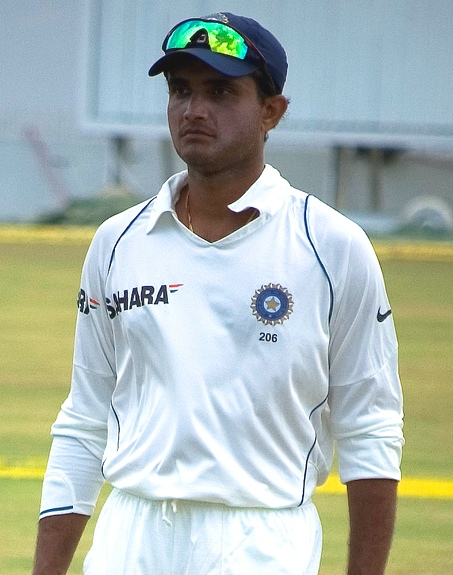
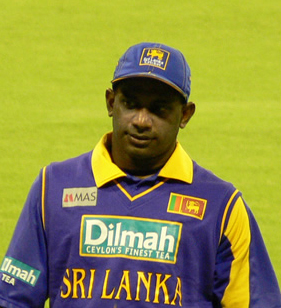
Sourav Ganguly (left) and Sanath Jayasuriya (right) captained India and Sri Lanka respectively.

The final of the 2002 ICC Champions Trophy was washed out twice, on 29 and 30 September 2002 at the R. Premadasa Stadium, Colombo. The matches were scheduled to be played between the Sri Lanka cricket team and the India cricket team, captained by Sanath Jayasuriya and Sourav Ganguly respectively. Both the teams shared the Trophy.

=== Match officials ===
- On-field umpires: Steve Bucknor (WI) and David Shepherd (Eng)
- TV umpire: Daryl Harper (Aus)
- Match referee: Clive Lloyd (WI)

=== 29 September ===
On 29 September, Sri Lanka batted first after Jayasuriya winning the toss and scored 244 runs. Jayasuriya and Kumar Sangakkara scored fifties—74 and 54 runs respectively, and Indian off-spinner Harbhajan Singh took three wickets for 27 in 10 overs. In reply, India started their batting and scored 14 runs without any loss in two overs before the match was abandoned due to heavy rain; the match was finished in no result. It was decided that the new match would be played on the reserve day.

29 September
Scorecard

Sri Lanka; 244/5 (50 overs)	v	India; 14/0 (2 overs)
Sanath Jayasuriya 74 (89); Harbhajan Singh 3/27 (10 overs)		Virender Sehwag 13* (5)

No result
R. Premadasa Stadium, Colombo
Umpires: Steve Bucknor (WI) and David Shepherd (Eng)

- Sri Lanka won the toss and elected to bat.
- Match rained out.

=== 30 September ===
On the reserve day—30 September—the Sri Lankans again batted first, scoring 222 runs for seven in 50 overs. Mahela Jayawardene and Russel Arnold scored fifties—77 and 56 runs respectively, and Indian left-arm pacer Zaheer Khan took three wickets for 44 runs in nine overs. India scored 38 runs in 8.4 overs and the match was abandoned due to rain without result.

30 September
Scorecard

Sri Lanka; 222/7 (50 overs)	v	India; 38/1 (8 overs)
Mahela Jayawardene 77 (99); Zaheer Khan 3/44 (9 overs)		Virender Sehwag 25* (22); Chaminda Vaas 1/24 (4.4 overs)

No result. India and Sri Lanka are declared as co-champions
R. Premadasa Stadium, Colombo
Umpires: Steve Bucknor (WI) and David Shepherd (Eng)

- Sri Lanka won the toss and elected to bat.
- Match rained out again. India and Sri Lanka declared co-champions.

In both matches, Man of the match and Man of the Series were not awarded. Both the teams, India and Sri Lanka, were declared joint winners sharing the trophy and a prize money of $300,000. West Indian Steve Bucknor and David Shepherd of England stood as umpires of the matches. Daryl Harper of Australia was the TV umpire and the Zimbabwean Russell Tiffin was the reserve umpire for the matches. Match referee for the finals was former West Indian captain Clive Lloyd.

== Aftermath ==
International Cricket Council's (ICC) rule for One Day International (ODI) cricket at that time was: "a minimum of 25 overs have to be bowled to the side batting second to constitute a match". Indian cricketers criticized the rule ICC Champions Trophy after rain washed-out the final twice. Former Indian wicket-keeper Farokh Engineer about the rule that the "it's absolutely daft", and it "doesn't make any sense". Sanjay Manjrekar, former Test cricketer, said that the ICC "should look at that rule straight away and change it", and the "obvious thing is to continue from where they left off". Ajit Wadekar, former Indian captain, called the matches "boring" and asked the ICC to revise the group format for the tournament to preclude meaningless matches in the first round.
