= ICC Champions Trophy =

International One Day International (ODI) cricket tournament

- Administrator: International Cricket Council
- Format: One Day International
- First edition: 1998; Bangladesh
- Latest edition: 2025: Pakistan; United Arab Emirates (Note: The official sole host for the tournament was Pakistan. Due to India's refusal to visit Pakistan, their matches were shifted to the United Arab Emirates.)
- Next edition: 2029; India
- Tournament format: Group stage and knockout
- Current champion: India (3rd title)
- Most successful: India (3 titles)
- Most runs: (Cricket West Indies) Chris Gayle (791)
- Most wickets: (New Zealand) Kyle Mills (28)
- Website: icc-cricket.com

The ICC Champions Trophy, formerly known as the ICC KnockOut Trophy, is an international One Day International (ODI) cricket tournament organised by the International Cricket Council (ICC) and contested by international men's teams. Inaugurated in 1998, the Champions Trophy was established by the ICC as a short cricket tournament to raise funds for the development of the game in non-Test playing countries, contrasting with the mainstream Cricket World Cup, which had, at the time, existed for 23 years with six completed editions.

The first Champions Trophy was organised in Bangladesh in June 1998 and the next edition was held in Kenya in October 2000. These nations – both ICC Associate members – were chosen as hosts to increase the popularity of cricket and then use the funds collected for the continued development of the sport in those countries. From the 2002 tournament onwards, hosting has been shared between countries under an unofficial rotation system, with six ICC members having hosted at least one match in the tournament. The current format involves a qualification phase, which takes place in the preceding edition of the Cricket World Cup, to determine which teams qualify for the tournament phase. The top eight ranked teams in the World Cup (including the hosts of the Champions Trophy) secure a berth for the tournament.

So far, a total of fourteen teams have competed in the nine editions of the tournament. India (2002, 2013, 2025), who is the current champion after winning the 2025 edition, is the most successful team with three titles; Australia (2006, 2009) has won it twice; while South Africa (1998), New Zealand (2000), Sri Lanka (2002), West Indies (2004) and Pakistan (2017) have won it once each. The 2002 edition was shared between India and Sri Lanka after the final ended in a no-result due to rain.

== Overview ==
Men's Champions Trophy winners
Year	Champions
1998	South Africa
2000	New Zealand
2002	India & Sri Lanka
2004	West Indies
2006	Australia
2009	Australia (2)
2013	India (2)
2017	Pakistan
2025	India (3)

=== ICC KnockOut Trophy (1998–2000) ===
The first Cricket World Cup was held in 1975 and then every four years since. The World Cup was usually played by full ICC member nations. The ICC conceived the idea of the Champions Trophy: a short cricket tournament to raise funds for the development of the game in non-Test playing countries, with the first two tournaments being held in Bangladesh and Kenya.

It was inaugurated as the ICC KnockOut Trophy, which was held in 1998 and 2000. The tournament's name was changed to the Champions Trophy before the 2002 edition.

=== ICC Champions Trophy (2002–2017) ===
Since 2002, the tournament has been held in full ICC member nations with the number of teams reduced to eight. The tournament, later dubbed the "Mini World Cup" as it involved all of the full members of the ICC, was planned as a knock-out tournament so that it was short and did not reduce the value and importance of the World Cup. However, from 2002, the tournament has had a round-robin format, followed by a few knockout games, but the tournament still takes places over a short period of time – about two weeks.

The number of teams competing has varied over the years; originally all the ICC's full members took part, and from 2000 to 2004 associate members were also involved. Since 2009, the tournament has only involved the eight highest-ranked teams in the ICC ODI Rankings as of six months prior to the beginning of the tournament. The tournament has been held in 7 countries since its inception, with England hosting it thrice.

Up to 2006 the Champions Trophy was held every two years. The tournament had been scheduled to be held in Pakistan in 2008 but was moved to South Africa in 2009 due to security reasons. From then on it has been held every four years like the World Cup.

There were calls to scrap the tournament after 2013 and 2017, with no tournament hosted in 2021. However, it was reinstated in 2025.

=== Revival and rebranding (2025 onwards) ===
On 13 November 2024, the ICC launched a refreshed visual identity with an unconventional typographic logo for the Champions Trophy with the release of a brand launch video. The new elements were accompanied by the distinctive white jackets which nod to the history of the Champions Trophy.

Pakistan was announced as the host of the 2025 ICC Champions Trophy, however, due to India's refusal to travel to Pakistan for the tournament citing security concerns, the ICC in an update issued on India and Pakistan hosted matches at ICC events, following an agreement between BCCI and PCB, established that the ICC Champions Trophy 2025 was played across Pakistan and a neutral venue in Dubai. The ICC board confirmed that India and Pakistan matches hosted by either country at ICC events between 2024 and 2027 would be played at a neutral venue. On 24 December 2024, the fixtures were announced along with the Dubai International Cricket Stadium in Dubai, UAE as the neutral venue for the tournament.

== Format ==
The physical Champions Trophy

=== Qualification ===
In the first eight editions, the top teams in the ICC Men's ODI Team Rankings qualified in the tournament. In the first 2 editions, a few pairs of teams played in the Pre-Quarter-finals to determine who would move on to the Quarter-finals. The number of teams was 9 in 1998, which was increased to 11 in 2000 and to 12 in 2002. In 2006, it was reduced to 10, with four teams playing in a qualifying round-robin from which 2 progressed to the main tournament. From the 2009 tournament onwards, the number further reduced to 8.

From the 2025 ICC Champions Trophy onwards, the top eight teams of the ICC Men's Cricket World Cup will qualify for the event.

=== Tournament ===
The Champions Trophy differs from the World Cup in a number of ways. The matches in the Champions Trophy are held over a period of around two-and-a-half weeks, while the World Cup can last for over a month. The number of teams in the Champions Trophy are fewer than in the World Cup, with the latest edition of the World Cup having ten teams, whereas the latest edition of the Champions Trophy had eight.

For 2002 and 2004, twelve teams played a round-robin tournament in four pools of three, with the top team in each pool moving forward to the semi-final. A team would play only four games (two in the pool, semi-final and final) to win the tournament. The format used in the KnockOut tournaments (1998 and 2000) differed from the formats used in the Champions Trophy. The competition consisted entirely of a single-elimination tournament (a type of knockout tournament, hence the name used at that time), with no pools and the loser in each game being eliminated immediately. Only eight games were played in 1998, and ten games in 2000.

Since 2009, eight teams have played in two pools of four in a round-robin format, with the top two teams in each pool playing in the semi-finals. Losing a single match potentially means elimination from the tournament. A total of 15 matches are played in the present format of the tournament, with the tournament lasting about two and a half weeks.

== Hosts ==
Host countries of the Champions Trophy (Italics indicates a future event)

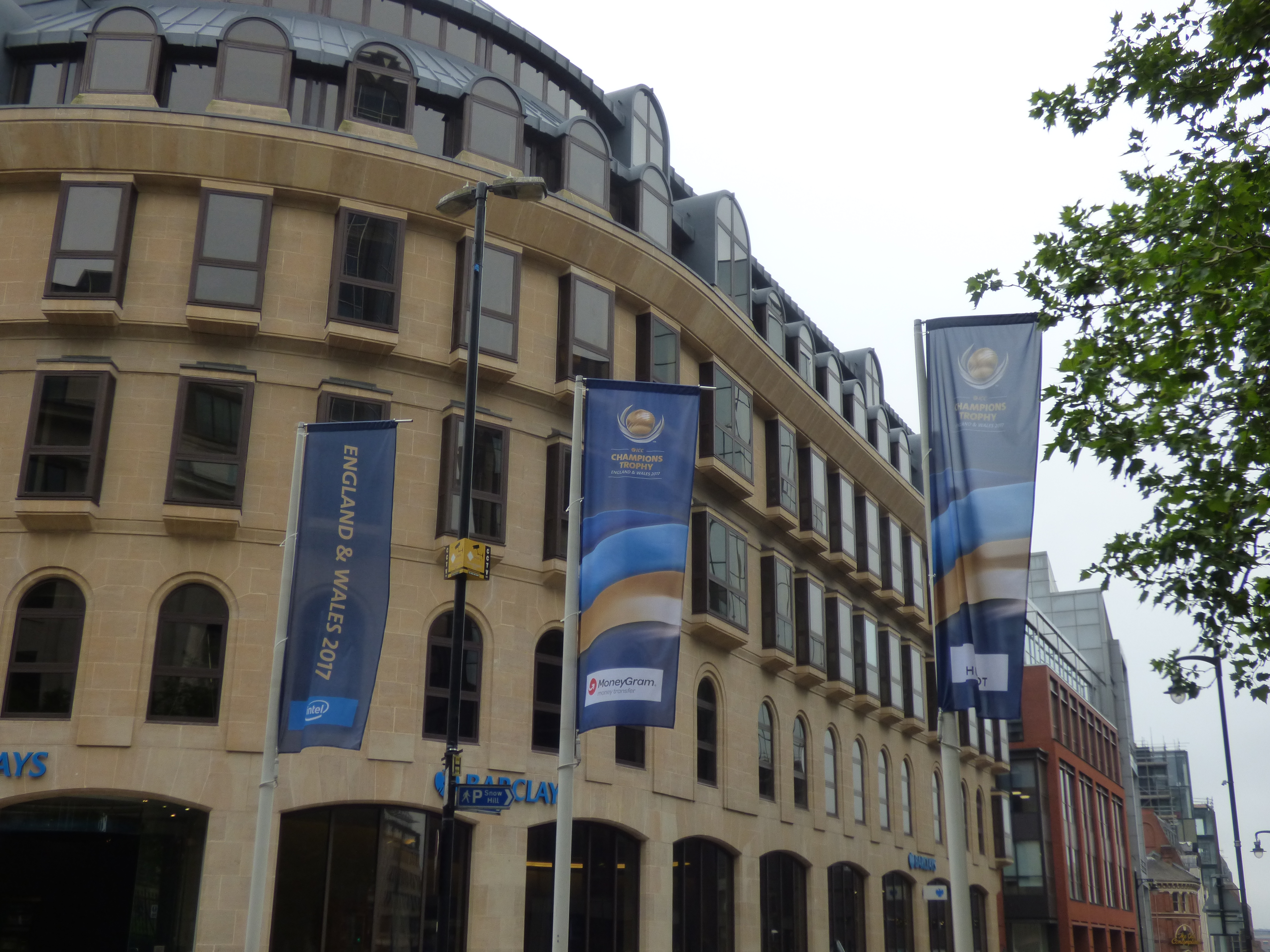
Banners of the 2017 Champions Trophy on Colmore Row, England

England has hosted the tournament for the most times – 3 (2004, 2013, 2017) followed by Wales (2013 and 2017). Bangladesh, Kenya, Sri Lanka, India and South Africa have all hosted the tournament once each.

Sri Lanka were the first (and currently the only) host team to win the tournament (alongside joint winners India), while also being the first home team to reach the final of the tournament. England reached the final two times, both on home soil, only to lose to winners West Indies (2004) and India (2013) respectively.

In 2021, the ICC announced the Future Tours Programme for the 2024–2031 cycle, announcing Pakistan as the host for the 2025 edition and India for the 2029 edition of the tournament.

== Results ==
Ed.	Year	Host(s)	Final				No. of teams
Ed.	Year	Host(s)	Venue	Champions	Result	Runners-up	No. of teams
1	1998	Bangladesh	National Stadium, Dhaka	South Africa; 248/6 (47 overs)	South Africa won by 4 wickets Scorecard	West Indies; 245 (49.3 overs)	9
2	2000	Kenya	Gymkhana Club Ground, Nairobi	New Zealand; 265/6 (49.4 overs)	New Zealand won by 4 wickets Scorecard	India; 264/6 (50 overs)	11
3	2002	Sri Lanka	R. Premadasa Stadium, Colombo	Sri Lanka; 244/5 (50 Overs) & 222/7 (50 Overs) India; 14/0 (2 Overs) & 38/1 (8.4 Overs)	No result due to rain (joint winners); Scorecard; Scorecard	N.A	12
4	2004	England	The Oval, London	West Indies; 218/8 (48.5 overs)	West Indies won by 2 wickets Scorecard	England; 217 (49.4 overs)	12
5	2006	India	Brabourne Stadium, Mumbai	Australia; 116/2 (28.1 overs)	Australia won by 8 wickets (D/L method); Scorecard	West Indies; 138 (30.4 overs)	10
6	2009	South Africa	SuperSport Park, Centurion	Australia; 206/4 (45.2 overs)	Australia won by 6 wickets Scorecard	New Zealand; 200/9 (50 overs)	8
7	2013	England; Wales	Edgbaston Cricket Ground, Birmingham	India; 129/7 (20 overs)	India won by 5 runs Scorecard	England; 124/8 (20 overs)	8
8	2017	England; Wales	The Oval, London	Pakistan; 338/4 (50 overs)	Pakistan won by 180 runs Scorecard	India; 158 (30.3 overs)	8
9	2025	Pakistan; United Arab Emirates	Dubai International Cricket Stadium, Dubai	India; 254/6 (49 overs)	India won by 4 wickets Scorecard	New Zealand; 251/7 (50 overs)	8
10	2029	India	TBA				8

== History ==
Fourteen nations have qualified for the Champions Trophy at least once. Seven teams have competed in every finals tournament. Seven different nations have won the title. South Africa won the inaugural tournament, India are the most successful team, having won three times. Australia has won two times, while New Zealand, Sri Lanka, West Indies and Pakistan have each won once. Australia (2006, 2009) is the only nation to have won consecutive titles. Bangladesh, Zimbabwe, England and Ireland are the only ICC Full Member Nations (Test-Playing Nations) not to win the Champions Trophy. England has reached the final twice, but lost both times (2004, 2013), Bangladesh reached the semi-finals in 2017, while Zimbabwe has never got past the first round. The highest rank secured by an associate member nation (non test-playing nations) is the 9th rank in first stage achieved by Kenya in 2000.

Sri Lanka was the first and only host to win the tournament, in 2002, but they were declared co-champions with India as the final was twice washed out. England is the only other host to have made the final. It has achieved this twice – in 2004 and 2013. Bangladesh is the only host who did not take part in the tournament while hosting it, in 1998. Kenya in 2000, India in 2006, Pakistan in 2025, and South Africa in 2009 have been the only host teams that were eliminated in the first round.

=== ICC KnockOut Trophies ===
All of the matches in the 1998 tournament were played in Bangladesh at Bangabandhu National Stadium in Dhaka. The tournament was won by South Africa who beat West Indies in the final. Philo Wallace of West Indies was the leading run scorer in the tournament of scoring 221 runs.

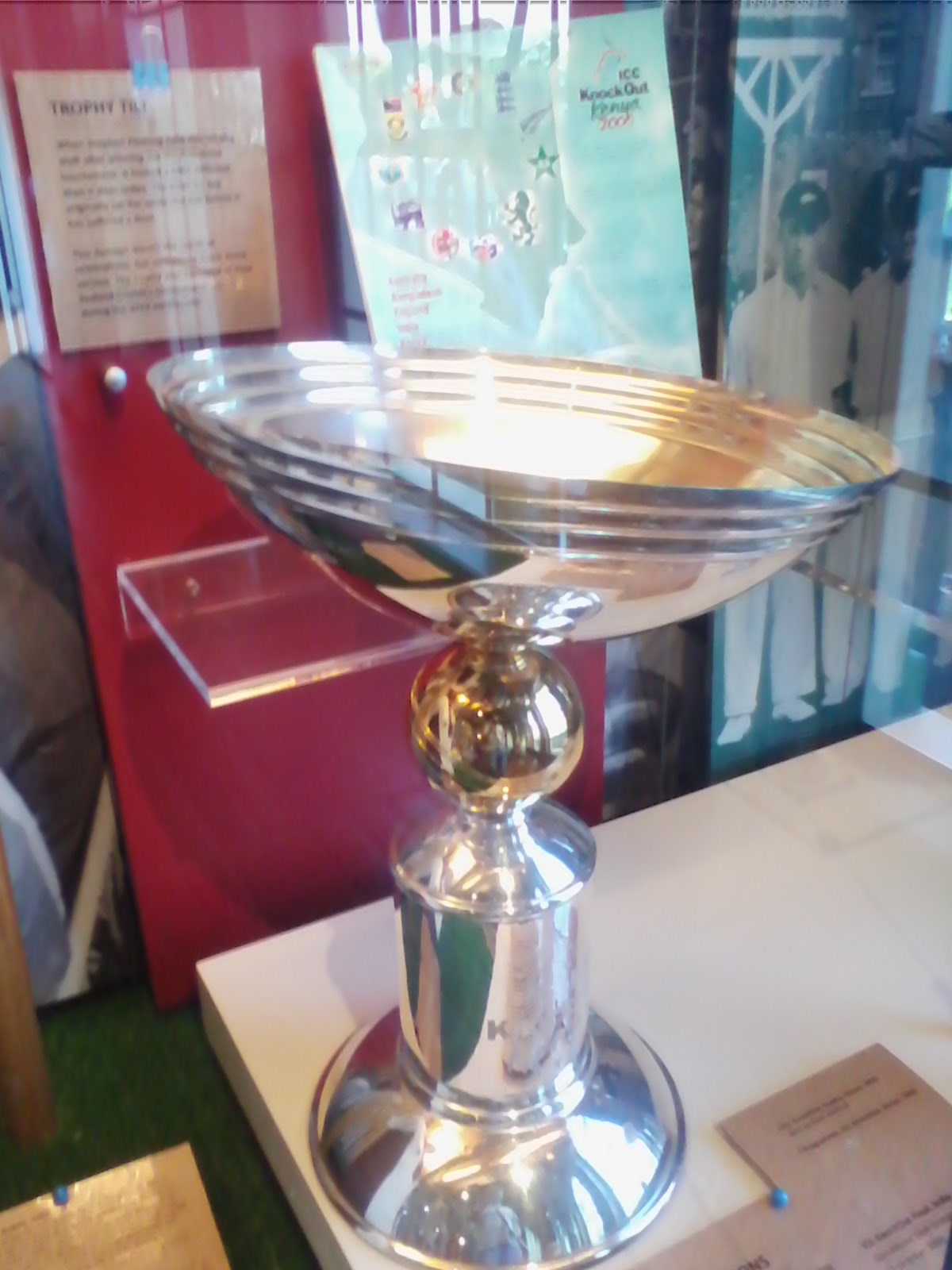
The 2000 ICC KnockOut Trophy on display at the New Zealand Cricket Museum, Wellington

All of the matches in the 2000 tournament were played at Gymkhana Club Ground in Nairobi, Kenya. All the test playing nations participated in the tournament along with the finals, involving Kenya, India, Sri Lanka, West Indies, Bangladesh and England. The tournament was won by New Zealand who beat India in the final. Indian skipper Sourav Ganguly (348) was the leading run scorer in this tournament. Venkatesh Prasad (8) was the leading wicket taker. This was the first ICC event won by New Zealand. It was also their only ICC trophy until 2021, and their only limited overs tournament to date.

=== 2002 ICC Champions Trophy ===
The 2002 ICC Champions Trophy was held in Sri Lanka, and included the 10 ICC Test playing nations including the newly appointed full member Bangladesh, Kenya (ODI status) and the 2001 ICC Trophy winners Netherlands. The final between India and Sri Lanka was washed out due to rain twice to leave no result. First, Sri Lanka played 50 overs and then India played two overs before the rain caused interruption. The next day, Sri Lanka again played 50 overs and India played eight overs. In the end India and Sri Lanka were declared joint winners. The teams played 110 overs, but there was no result. Virender Sehwag (271) had the highest number of runs in the tournament and Muralitharan (10) had the highest number of wickets.

=== 2004 ICC Champions Trophy ===
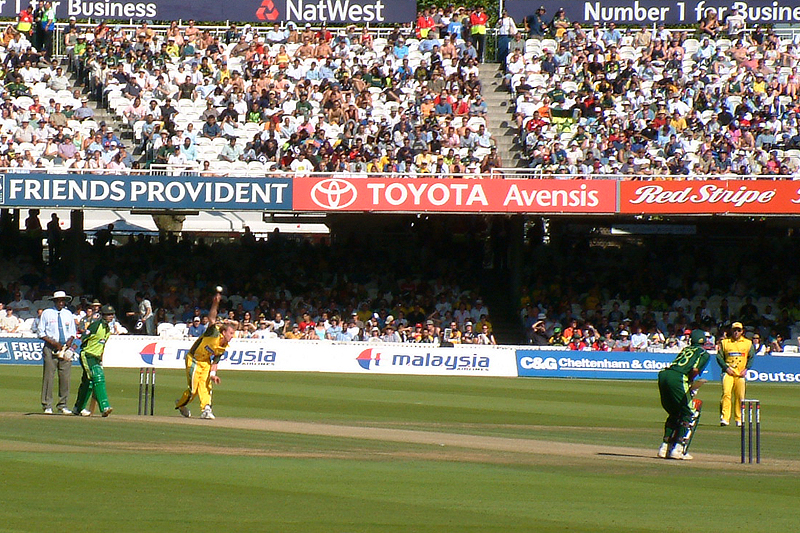
Brett Lee bowling against Pakistan during a warm-up game of the tournament

The 2004 ICC Champions Trophy was held in England and the nations competing included the ten ICC Test nations, Kenya (ODI status), and – making their One Day International debut – the United States who qualified by winning the recent 2004 ICC Six Nations Challenge. The competition was more like a knockout series where teams losing even one game at the group stage were out of the tournament. The 12 teams were divided into 4 groups and the table topper from each group played semi finals. ENG defeated AUS in the 1st semi-final to make their 4th appearance in final of an ICC event. PAK lost to WI in the second semi final, which was a low scoring game. In the final game the WI team under Lara's leadership won a tense match with the help of wicket keeper C Browne and tailender Ian Bradshaw.

=== 2006 ICC Champions Trophy ===
The 2006 ICC Champions Trophy was held in India with the final on 5 November 2006. A new format was used. Eight teams were competing in the group phase: the top six teams in the ICC ODI Championship on 1 April 2006, plus two teams chosen from the other four Test-playing teams Sri Lanka, West Indies, Bangladesh and Zimbabwe, chosen from a pre-tournament round robin qualifying round. West Indies and Sri Lanka qualified ahead of Bangladesh and Zimbabwe.

The eight teams were then split into two groups of four in a round robin competition. While Australia and West Indies qualified from Group A, South Africa and New Zealand qualified from Group B for the semifinals. Australia and West Indies reached the final defeating New Zealand and South Africa, respectively. In the final, Australia beat West Indies by eight wickets to win the trophy for the first time. The venues for the tournament were Mohali, Ahmedabad, Jaipur and Mumbai.

=== 2009 ICC Champions Trophy ===
In 2006, the ICC selected Pakistan to host the 2008 ICC Champions Trophy. On 24 August 2008 it was announced that the 2008 ICC Champions Trophy in Pakistan has been postponed to October 2009 as several countries were reluctant to visit Pakistan for security reasons. However, due to the crowded international schedule around that date, and concerns about whether the security situation would have changed by that time, there was widespread scepticism whether it would actually take place in 2009.

On 16 March 2009, an announcement was made that the ICC has recommended that the 2009 ICC Champions Trophy be moved from Pakistan to South Africa.

On 2 April 2009, Cricket South Africa confirmed that it would host the 2009 ICC Champions Trophy from 24 September to 5 October. The Board accepted recommendations from the ICC that Liberty Life Wanderers (Johannesburg) and Supersport Park (Centurion) be the host venues. The details of SA's hosting of the Champions Trophy were ironed out at a meeting between CSA's CEO Gerald Majola and ICC general manager – Commercial, Campbell Jamieson. Majola confirmed that the six warm-up games will be played at Benoni's Willowmoore Park, and Senwes Park in Potchefstroom.

Australia beat England by 9 wickets in the 1st semi-final, and New Zealand beat Pakistan by 5 wickets in the 2nd semi-final, to set up a final that saw Australia beat New Zealand by 6 wickets, in 45.2 overs.

=== 2013 ICC Champions Trophy ===
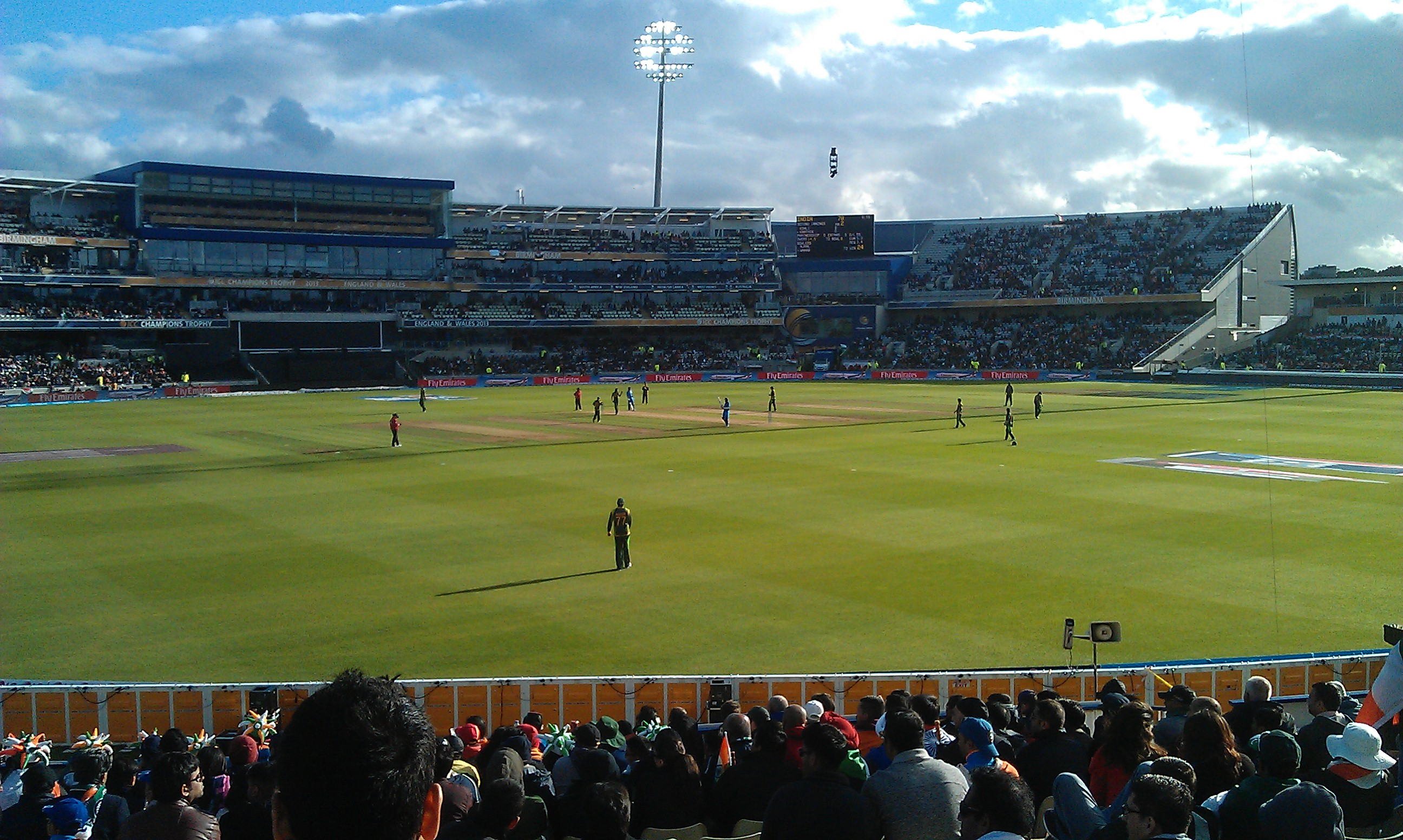
The group stage match between India and Pakistan during the 2013 edition

England and Wales hosted the 2013 Champions Trophy. England became the only country to host the Champions Trophy twice. Australia failed to win a single game in their group, and were knocked out along with New Zealand in Group A. Pakistan lost all three games in Group B and were knocked out along with West Indies. England and Sri Lanka from Group A, and India and South Africa from Group B, made it to the semi-finals.

India and England won their respective games against Sri Lanka and South Africa comprehensively and the final between the two took place on 23 June 2013. India beat England by 5 runs at Edgbaston, winning their second title, although their first title, in 2002, was shared with Sri Lanka due to the final being washed out. Ravindra Jadeja was adjudged man of the match and he also received the "Golden Ball" for taking the most wickets in the tournament. Shikhar Dhawan received the "Golden Bat" for scoring the most runs in the series and was also adjudged the Man of the Series for his consistent outstanding performances. MS Dhoni became the first captain in history to win all three major ICC trophies – World Cup in 2011, World T20 in 2007 and this edition of the Champions Trophy.

=== 2017 ICC Champions Trophy ===
Pakistan team wearing the Champions Trophy white jackets after winning the 2017 final

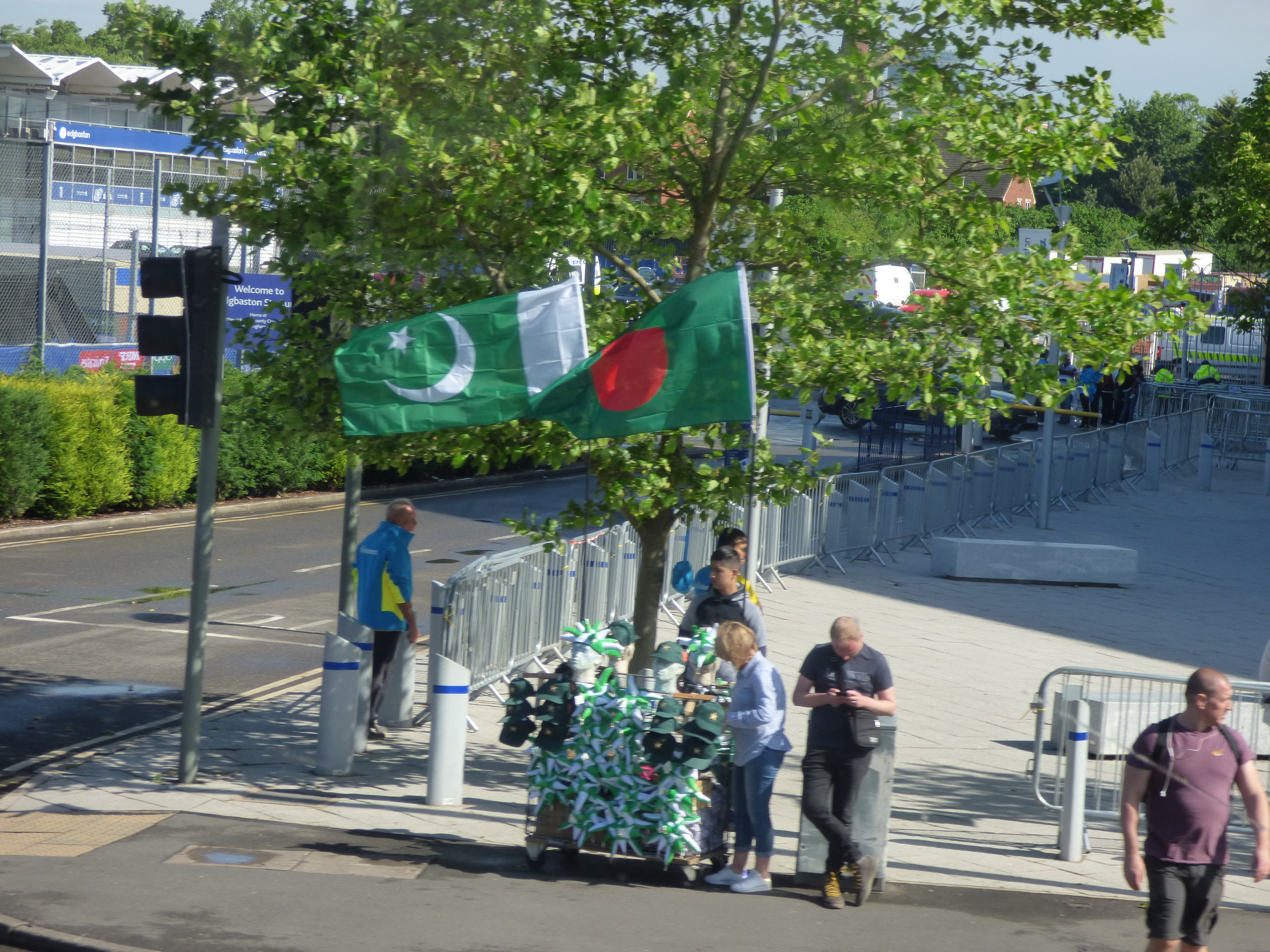
Match merchandise being sold ahead of the match between Pakistan and Bangladesh

In the lead-up to the 2013 tournament, the ICC announced that the 2013 Champions Trophy was to be the last, with its place in the cricketing calendar to be taken by a new ICC World Test Championship. However, in January 2014, that decision was reversed, due to the massive success of the 2013 edition, with the ICC confirming that the 2017 Champions Trophy tournament would take place and the proposed Test Championship was cancelled. England and Wales hosted the 2017 ICC Champions Trophy. England became the only country to host the Champions Trophy thrice, and England and Wales became the only countries to host the ICC Champions Trophy consecutively, also hosting the 2013 edition. Bangladesh replaced the West Indies, who finished outside the top eight in ninth position, in the ICC ODI Team Rankings on the cut-off date. Bangladesh returned to the ICC Champions Trophy for the first time since 2006, and, for the first time, the West Indies failed to qualify, having won the tournament in 2004.

Arch-rivals Pakistan and defending champions India took each other on in the final of a tournament for the first time since 2007, with the final taking place at The Oval in London. It was India's fourth appearance and Pakistan's maiden appearance in a Champions Trophy final. Pakistan beat India comfortably by 180 runs, outclassing them across all three departments-batting, bowling and fielding, unlike in the match between the two teams in the group stages, where India had beaten Pakistan by a huge margin. Pakistan, the lowest-ranked team in the competition, won their first Champions Trophy title and became the seventh nation to win it.

Fakhar Zaman of Pakistan received the Man of the Match award for scoring 114. Shikhar Dhawan of India received the "Golden Bat" award for scoring 338 runs, and became the first and only batter to not only win 2 Golden Bats in the ICC Champions Trophy but also 2 consecutive Golden Bats (he also won it in 2013). Hasan Ali of Pakistan received the "Golden Ball" award for taking 13 wickets; he was also adjudged the Man of the Series for his outstanding contribution towards Pakistan's first ICC title since the 2009 T20 World Cup.

=== 2025 ICC Champions Trophy ===
In November 2021, it was announced that the 2025 ICC Champions Trophy was to be held in Pakistan. Due to political tensions, India refused to play matches in Pakistan and it was decided that tournament would take place using a hybrid model, with India's group matches and semi-final played in Dubai, with the final also moved to Dubai. In the final, India defeated New Zealand by four wickets to win their record third title after 2002 and 2013.

=== 2029 ICC Champions Trophy ===
In November 2021, it was announced that the 2029 ICC Champions Trophy would be held in India. It is expected to be played in October and November 2029. Due to political tensions, Pakistan may play outside India.

== Performance by nations ==
Host Team	1998	2000	2002	2004	2006	2009	2013	2017	2025	2029	Total
Host Team	(Bangladesh)	(Kenya)	(Sri Lanka)	(England)	(India)	(South Africa)	(England) (Wales)		(Pakistan) (United Arab Emirates)	(India)	Total
Afghanistan	—	—	—	—	—	—	—	—	GRP		1
Australia	QF	QF	SF	SF	W	W	GRP	GRP	SF		9
Bangladesh	—	PQF	GRP	GRP	GRP	—	—	SF	GRP		6
England	QF	QF	GRP	RU	GRP	SF	RU	SF	GRP		9
India	SF	RU	W *	GRP	GRP	GRP	W	RU	W	Q	9
Kenya	—	PQF	GRP	GRP	—	—	—	—	—		3
Netherlands	—	—	GRP	—	—	—	—	—	—		1
New Zealand	QF	W	GRP	GRP	SF	RU	GRP	GRP	RU		9
Pakistan	QF	SF	GRP	SF	GRP	SF	GRP	W	GRP		9
South Africa	W	SF	SF	GRP	SF	GRP	SF	GRP	SF		9
Sri Lanka	SF	QF	W *	GRP	GRP	GRP	SF	GRP	—		8
United States	—	—	—	GRP	—	—	—	—	—		1
West Indies	RU	PQF	GRP	W	RU	GRP	GRP	—	—		7
Zimbabwe	PQF	QF	GRP	GRP	GRP	—	—	—	—		5

Legend

- W – Champions
- RU – Runners-up
- SF – Semi-finalists
- QF – Quarter-finalists (1998–2000)
- PQF – Pre-quarter finalists (1998–2000)
- GRP – Group stage (2002–present)
- Q – Qualified
- F – Final
- Hosts

Notes

^{*} India and Sri Lanka were declared co-champions of the 2002 ICC Champions Trophy, due to heavy rain during both the day of the Final and the reserve day.

=== Debutant teams ===
Team appearing for the first time, in alphabetical order per year.

Year	Debutants	Total
1998	Australia, England, India, New Zealand, Pakistan, South Africa, Sri Lanka, West Indies, Zimbabwe	9
2000	Bangladesh, Kenya	2
2002	Netherlands	1
2004	United States	1
2006	None	—N/a
2009	None	—N/a
2013	None	—N/a
2017	None	—N/a
2025	Afghanistan	1
Total		14

=== Overview ===
The table below provides an overview of the performances of teams over past ICC Champions Trophy. Teams are sorted by best performance, total number of wins, then by appearances, total number of games, and alphabetical order.

	Appearances				Statistics					
Team	Total	First	Latest	Best result	Played	Won	Lost	Tied	No result	Win%
India	9	1998	2025	Champions (2002*, 2013, 2025)	34	23	8	0	3	74.19
Australia	9	1998	2025	Champions (2006, 2009)	27	13	9	0	5	59.09
New Zealand	9	1998	2025	Champions (2000)	29	15	12	0	2	55.55
South Africa	9	1998	2025	Champions (1998)	27	14	12	1	0	53.70
Sri Lanka	8	1998	2017	Champions (2002*)	27	14	11	0	2	56.00
West Indies	7	1998	2013	Champions (2004)	24	13	10	1	0	56.25
Pakistan	9	1998	2025	Champions (2017)	25	11	14	0	0	44.00
England	9	1998	2025	Runners-up (2004, 2013)	28	14	14	0	0	50.00
Bangladesh	6	2000	2025	Semi-finals (2017)	14	2	11	0	1	15.38
Zimbabwe	5	1998	2006	Quarter-finals (2000)	9	0	9	0	0	0.00
Afghanistan	1	2025	2025	Group stage (2025)	3	1	1	0	1	50.00
Kenya	3	2000	2004	Group stage (2002, 2004)	5	0	5	0	0	0.00
Netherlands	1	2002	2002	Pool stage (2002)	2	0	2	0	0	0.00
United States	1	2004	2004	Group stage (2004)	2	0	2	0	0	0.00
Last Updated: 10 March 2025 Source: Cricinfo

^ The win percentage excludes matches with no result and counts ties as half a win.

^{*} India and Sri Lanka were declared co-champions of the 2002 ICC Champions Trophy, due to heavy rain during both the day of the Final and the reserve day.

== Other results ==
=== Results of host teams ===
Year	Host Team	Result
1998	Bangladesh	Did not play
2000	Kenya	Pre quarter-finalists
2002	Sri Lanka	Champions*
2004	England	Runners-up
2006	India	Group stage
2009	South Africa	Group stage
2013	England	Runners-up
2017	England	Semi-finalists
2025	Pakistan	Group stage

* joint-champions along with India

=== Results of defending champions ===
Year	Defending champions	Result
1998	Inaugural edition	
2000	South Africa	Semi-finalists
2002	New Zealand	Group stage
2004	India	Group stage
2004	Sri Lanka	Group stage
2006	West Indies	Runners-up
2009	Australia	Champions
2013	Australia	Group stage
2017	India	Runners-up
2025	Pakistan	Group stage

== Tournament records ==
=== Records summary ===
As of 9 March 2025

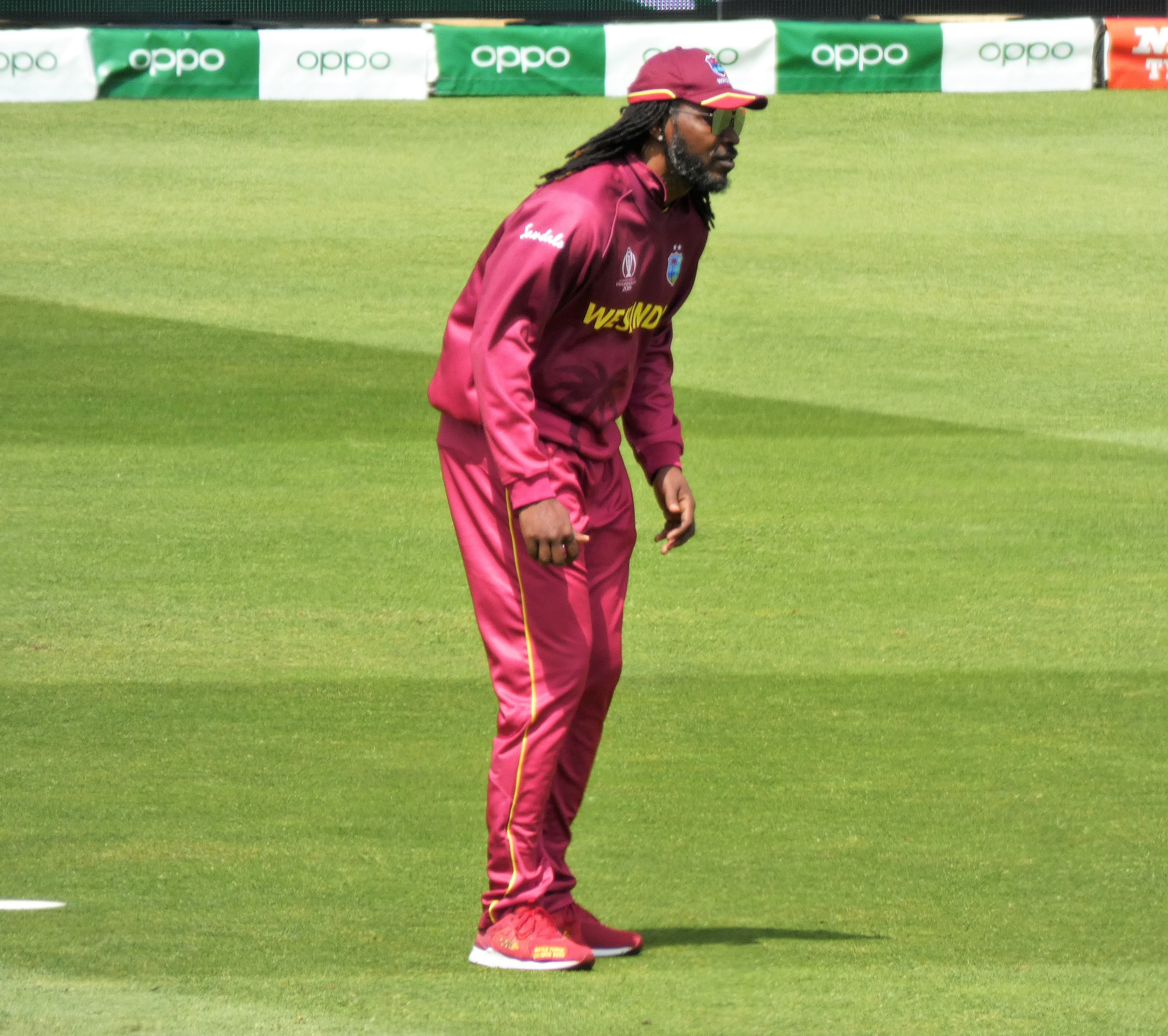
Chris Gayle has scored the most runs in the tournament.

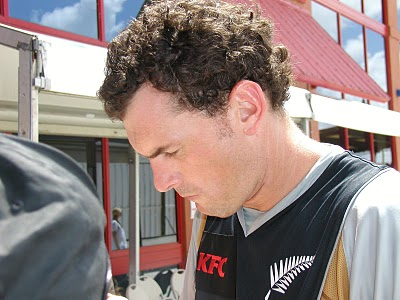
Kyle Mills has taken the most wickets in the tournament.

Batting
Most runs	(Cricket West Indies) Chris Gayle	791 (2002–2013)
Highest score	(Afghanistan) Ibrahim Zadran v England	177 (2025)
Highest partnership	(Australia) Shane Watson & Ricky Ponting (2nd wicket) v England	252 (2009)
Most runs in a tournament	(Cricket West Indies) Chris Gayle	474 (2006)
Bowling
Most wickets	(New Zealand) Kyle Mills	28 (2002–2013)
Best bowling figures	(Sri Lanka) Farveez Maharoof v West Indies	6/14 (2006)
Most wickets in a tournament	(Pakistan) Hasan Ali (2017) (Cricket West Indies) Jerome Taylor (2006)	13
Fielding
Most dismissals (wicket-keeper)	(Sri Lanka) Kumar Sangakkara	33 (2000–2013)
Most catches (fielder)	(Sri Lanka) Mahela Jayawardene	15 (2000–2013)
Team
Highest team total	New Zealand (v South Africa)	362/6 (2025)
Lowest team total	United States (v Australia)	65 (2004)
Largest victory (by runs)	New Zealand (v United States)	210 (2004)
Highest match aggregate	England v Australia	707–13 (2025)
Lowest match aggregate	Australia v United States	131–11 (2004)

=== Batting ===
==== Most tournament runs ====
Runs	Player	Team	Innings	Period
791	Chris Gayle	West Indies	17	2002–2013
747	Virat Kohli	India	16	2009–2025
742	Mahela Jayawardene	Sri Lanka	21	2000–2013
701	Shikhar Dhawan	India	10	2013–2017
683	Kumar Sangakkara	Sri Lanka	21	2000–2013

- Source: CricInfo

==== Highest individual score ====
Runs	Player	Team	Opposition	Venue	Date
177	Ibrahim Zadran	Afghanistan	England	Gaddafi Stadium, Lahore	26 February 2025
165	Ben Duckett	England	Australia	Gaddafi Stadium, Lahore	22 February 2025
145*	Nathan Astle	New Zealand	United States	The Oval, London	10 September 2004
145	Andy Flower	Zimbabwe	India	R. Premadasa Stadium, Colombo	14 September 2002
141*	Sourav Ganguly	India	South Africa	Gymkhana Club Ground, Nairobi	13 October 2000

- Source: CricInfo

=== Bowling ===
==== Most tournament wickets ====
Wickets	Player	Team	Innings	Period
28	Kyle Mills	New Zealand	15	2002–2013
25	Lasith Malinga	Sri Lanka	16	2006–2017
24	Muttiah Muralitharan	Sri Lanka	15	1998–2009
22	Brett Lee	Australia	15	2000–2009
21	Glenn McGrath	Australia	12	2000–2006
21	James Anderson	England	12	2006–2013

- Source: CricInfo

==== Best figures in an innings ====
Figures	Player	Team	Opposition	Venue	Date
6/14	Farveez Maharoof	Sri Lanka	West Indies	Brabourne Stadium, Mumbai, India	14 October 2006
6/52	Josh Hazlewood	Australia	New Zealand	Edgbaston, Birmingham, England	2 June 2017
5/11	Shahid Afridi	Pakistan	Kenya	Edgbaston, Birmingham, England	14 September 2004
5/21	Makhaya Ntini	South Africa	Pakistan	IS Bindra Stadium, Mohali, India	27 October 2006
5/29	Mervyn Dillon	West Indies	Bangladesh	The Rose Bowl, Southampton, England	15 September 2004

- Source: CricInfo

=== By tournament ===
Year	Winning captain	Player of the final	Player of the tournament	Most runs	Most wickets	Ref.
1998	(South Africa) Hansie Cronje	(South Africa) Jacques Kallis	(South Africa) Jacques Kallis	(Cricket West Indies) Philo Wallace (221)	(South Africa) Jacques Kallis (8)	
2000	(New Zealand) Stephen Fleming	(New Zealand) Chris Cairns	Not awarded	(India) Sourav Ganguly (348)	(India) Venkatesh Prasad (8)	
2002	(India) Saurav Ganguly (Sri Lanka) Sanath Jayasuriya	Not awarded	Not awarded	(India) Virender Sehwag (271)	(Sri Lanka) Muttiah Muralitharan (10)	
2004	(Cricket West Indies) Brian Lara	(Cricket West Indies) Ian Bradshaw	(Cricket West Indies) Ramnaresh Sarwan	(England) Marcus Trescothick (261)	(England) Andrew Flintoff (9)	
2006	(Australia) Ricky Ponting	(Australia) Shane Watson	(Cricket West Indies) Chris Gayle	(Cricket West Indies) Chris Gayle (474)	(Cricket West Indies) Jerome Taylor (13)	
2009	(Australia) Ricky Ponting	(Australia) Shane Watson	(Australia) Ricky Ponting	(Australia) Ricky Ponting (288)	(South Africa) Wayne Parnell (11)	
2013	(India) Mahendra Singh Dhoni	(India) Ravindra Jadeja	(India) Shikhar Dhawan	(India) Shikhar Dhawan (363)	(India) Ravindra Jadeja (12)	
2017	(Pakistan) Sarfaraz Ahmed	(Pakistan) Fakhar Zaman	(Pakistan) Hasan Ali	(India) Shikhar Dhawan (338)	(Pakistan) Hasan Ali (13)	
2025	(India) Rohit Sharma	(India) Rohit Sharma	(New Zealand) Rachin Ravindra	(New Zealand) Rachin Ravindra (263)	(New Zealand) Matt Henry (10)	

== See also ==
- ICC Women's Champions Trophy
- ICC Cricket World Cup
- ICC T20 World Cup
- ICC World Test Championship
