= 2023 Cricket World Cup final =

Cricket World Cup final

2023 Cricket World Cup Final
- Mitchell Starc bowling against Rohit Sharma
- Event: 2023 Cricket World Cup
India	Australia
(India)	(Australia)
240	241/4
50 overs	43 overs
- Australia won by 6 wickets.
- Date: 19 November 2023
- Venue: Narendra Modi Stadium, Ahmedabad
- Player of the match: Travis Head (Aus)
- Umpires: Richard Illingworth (Eng) and Richard Kettleborough (Eng)
- Attendance: 92,453

The 2023 Cricket World Cup Final was a One Day International cricket match played at the Narendra Modi Stadium in Ahmedabad, on 19 November 2023 to determine the winner of the 2023 Cricket World Cup. It was played between host nation India and Australia. It was the first time that Ahmedabad hosted a Cricket World Cup final. It was the second time that India and Australia played a World Cup final against each other, after the 2003 final.

In the final, Australia defeated India to win a record-extending sixth World Cup title. The comfortable Australian victory, with seven overs to spare, is considered one of the bigger upsets in World Cup history, due to the heavily favoured India going undefeated through the entire tournament up until this point.

== Background ==
The 2023 Cricket World Cup was hosted by India. Originally, the competition was to be played from 9 February to 26 March 2023 but due to getting longer qualification time it was moved to October to November. In July 2020, it was announced that the tournament would be moved to October and November as a result of the qualification schedule being disrupted due to the COVID-19 pandemic. The ICC released the tournament schedule on 27 June 2023. Semi-finals were played in Mumbai and Kolkata while the final was held in Ahmedabad.

India secured a place in the final for the fourth time, after defeating New Zealand in the semi-final;. having won two (1983 against the West Indies and 2011 against Sri Lanka) and lost one (2003 to current finalist Australia).

Australia qualified for a record-extending eighth time in the final, after defeating South Africa in the semi-finals; having won five (1987 against England, 1999 against Pakistan, 2003 against current finalist India, 2007 against Sri Lanka, and 2015 against New Zealand) and lost two (1975 to the West Indies and 1996 to Sri Lanka).

It was the second time that India and Australia played a World Cup final against each other, the previous one being in 2003. None of the players from the squad of both teams were a part of that final, the only member who featured in that game was Rahul Dravid, India's head coach while there was no one from Australia's coaching staff and management being a part of 2003 final. However, there were 7 members from Australia's squad who were a part of the 2015 final that included David Warner, Steve Smith, Glenn Maxwell, Mitchell Starc, Josh Hazlewood (who were a part of the playing XI in the 2015 final), as well as Pat Cummins and Mitchell Marsh, who were not a part of the playing XI in the 2015 final. Meanwhile from the Indian team only Virat Kohli and Ravichandran Ashwin had featured in a World Cup final in 2011 and among the duo only Virat Kohli was a part of the playing XI in that final.

This match was the last One Day International (ODI) for Australian cricketer David Warner.

== Route to the final ==
Each team played the other nine teams in the group stage; the top four teams advanced to the semi-finals.

India		Round	Australia
Opponent	Result	Group stage	Opponent	Result
Australia	Won by 6 wickets	Match 1	India	Lost by 6 wickets
Afghanistan	Won by 8 wickets	Match 2	South Africa	Lost by 134 runs
Pakistan	Won by 7 wickets	Match 3	Sri Lanka	Won by 5 wickets
Bangladesh	Won by 7 wickets	Match 4	Pakistan	Won by 62 runs
New Zealand	Won by 4 wickets	Match 5	Netherlands	Won by 309 runs
England	Won by 100 runs	Match 6	New Zealand	Won by 5 runs
Sri Lanka	Won by 302 runs	Match 7	England	Won by 33 runs
South Africa	Won by 243 runs	Match 8	Afghanistan	Won by 3 wickets
Netherlands	Won by 160 runs	Match 9	Bangladesh	Won by 8 wickets
1st Place		Group stage positions	3rd Place
Opponent	Result	Knockout stage	Opponent	Result
New Zealand	India won by 70 runs	Semi-finals	South Africa	Australia won by 3 wickets
Source: ICC

== Match ==
=== Match officials ===
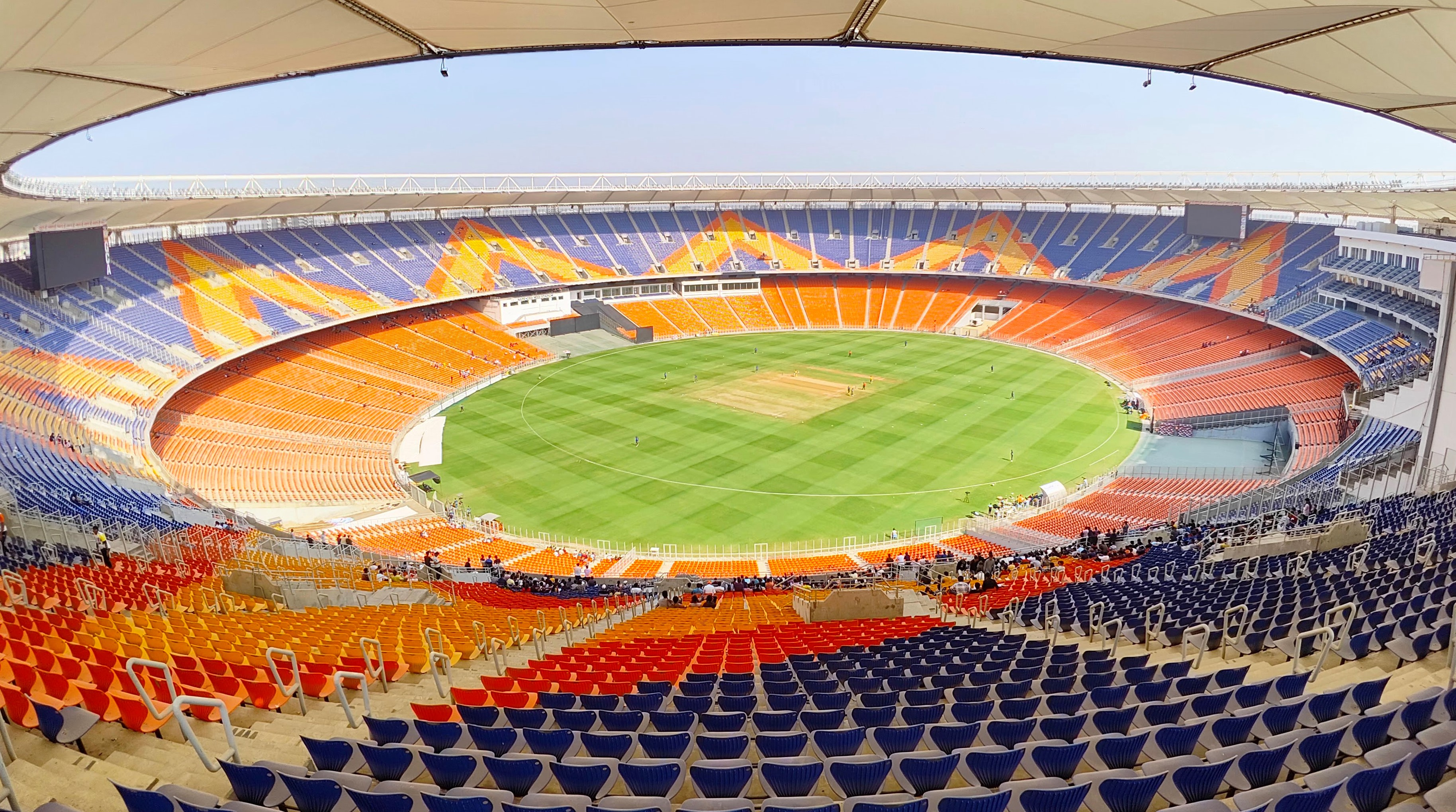
The Narendra Modi Stadium, the world's largest cricket stadium, hosted its first ever Cricket World Cup final.

On 17 November 2023, the International Cricket Council (ICC) named England's Richard Illingworth and Richard Kettleborough as the on-field umpires, with West Indies' Joel Wilson as the third umpire, New Zealand's Chris Gaffaney as the reserve umpire, and Zimbabwe's Andy Pycroft as match referee.

Kettleborough stood as the on-field umpire in the final for the second time, after 2015, while Illingworth, who played in the 1992 Cricket World Cup final(where he was coincidentally the last man dismissed), became the second person after Sri Lanka's Kumar Dharmasena to feature in the final of the World Cup as both a player and an umpire.

- On-field umpires: Richard Illingworth (Eng) and Richard Kettleborough (Eng)
- TV umpire: Joel Wilson (WI)
- Reserve umpire: Chris Gaffaney (NZ)
- Match referee: Andy Pycroft (Zim)

=== Teams and toss ===
Both teams remained unchanged from their semi-final matches. Australia won the toss and decided to field first.

=== India innings ===
India made a quick start to their innings, with captain Rohit Sharma hitting 47 from 31 balls despite losing opening partner Shubman Gill early on. The loss of Rohit via a brilliant Travis Head catch, and Shreyas Iyer soon after left themselves 81/3. Virat Kohli and K. L. Rahul added 67 for the fourth wicket. Later Kohli was dismissed by a slower ball from Pat Cummins, which Kohli inside-edged onto his stumps. India continued to add runs slowly, scoring just 2 boundaries in a 28 over period (10-38) until Rahul was dismissed for 66 to leave India at 203/6, and the remaining batsmen were not able to score quickly. The innings ended when Kuldeep Yadav was run-out on the last ball of the innings with the score on 240.

=== Australia innings ===
Following a flurry of runs in the opening overs, Australia's innings almost fell apart, with Mohammed Shami removing Warner and Jasprit Bumrah getting Mitchell Marsh and Steve Smith. At that point, Australia were 47 for 3 after 7 overs. While India was looking for more wickets, Travis Head and Marnus Labuschagne then built a partnership, which put on 192 runs in 35.5 overs. Australia were within two runs of victory when Head was dismissed by Mohammed Siraj for 137. Head who had scored 137 became the third Australian to score a century in a World Cup Final joining Adam Gilchrist and Ricky Ponting as Australians to have achieved that honour. Glenn Maxwell was the next batsman in, and hit the winning two runs off the next ball, to give Australia a 6-wicket victory.

=== Match details ===
19 November 2023
14:00 (D/N)
Scorecard

India; 240 (50 overs)	v	Australia; 241/4 (43 overs)
KL Rahul 66 (107); Mitchell Starc 3/55 (10 overs)		Travis Head 137 (120); Jasprit Bumrah 2/43 (9 overs)

Australia won by 6 wickets
Narendra Modi Stadium, Ahmedabad
Umpires: Richard Illingworth (Eng) and Richard Kettleborough (Eng)
Player of the match: Travis Head (Aus)

- Australia won the toss and elected to field
- David Warner (Aus) played in his last ODI match.
- Australia won their record sixth World Cup title.
Final scorecard

1st innings

India batting
Player	Status	Runs	Balls	4s	6s	Strike rate
Rohit Sharma	c Head b Maxwell	47	31	4	3	151.61
Shubman Gill	c Zampa b Starc	4	7	0	0	57.14
Virat Kohli	b Cummins	54	63	4	0	85.71
Shreyas Iyer	c †Inglis b Cummins	4	3	1	0	133.33
KL Rahul	c †Inglis b Starc	66	107	1	0	61.68
Ravindra Jadeja	c †Inglis b Hazlewood	9	22	0	0	40.90
Suryakumar Yadav	c †Inglis b Hazlewood	18	28	1	0	64.28
Mohammed Shami	c †Inglis b Starc	6	10	1	0	60.00
Jasprit Bumrah	lbw b Zampa	1	3	0	0	33.33
Kuldeep Yadav	run out (Labuschagne/Cummins)	10	18	0	0	55.55
Mohammed Siraj	not out	9	8	1	0	112.50
Extras	(lb 3, w 9)	12				
Total	(10 wickets; 50 overs)	240		13	3	

Fall of wickets: 1/30 (Gill, 4.2 ov), 2/76 (Rohit, 9.4 ov), 3/81 (Iyer, 10.2 ov), 4/148 (Kohli, 28.3 ov), 5/178 (Jadeja, 35.5 ov), 6/203 (Rahul, 41.3 ov), 7/211 (Shami, 43.4 ov), 8/214 (Bumrah, 44.5 ov), 9/226 (Yadav, 47.3 ov), 10/240 (Kuldeep, 49.6 ov)

Australia bowling
Bowler	Overs	Maidens	Runs	Wickets	Econ	Wides	NBs
Mitchell Starc	10	0	55	3	5.50	3	0
Josh Hazlewood	10	0	60	2	6.00	1	0
Glenn Maxwell	6	0	35	1	5.83	0	0
Pat Cummins	10	0	34	2	3.40	2	0
Adam Zampa	10	0	44	1	4.40	1	0
Mitchell Marsh	2	0	5	0	2.50	0	0
Travis Head	2	0	4	0	2.00	0	0

2nd innings

Australia batting
Player	Status	Runs	Balls	4s	6s	Strike rate
David Warner	c Kohli b Shami	7	3	1	0	233.33
Travis Head	c Gill b Siraj	137	120	15	4	114.16
Mitchell Marsh	c Rahul b Bumrah	15	15	1	1	100.00
Steve Smith	lbw b Bumrah	4	9	1	0	44.44
Marnus Labuschagne	not out	58	110	4	0	52.72
Glenn Maxwell	not out	2	1	0	0	200.00
Josh Inglis						
Mitchell Starc						
Pat Cummins						
Adam Zampa						
Josh Hazlewood						
Extras	(b 5, lb 2, w 11)	18				
Total	(4 wickets; 43 overs)	241		22	5	

Fall of wickets: 1/16 (Warner, 1.1 ov), 2/41 (Marsh, 4.3 ov), 3/47 (Smith, 6.6 ov), 4/239 (Head, 42.5 ov)

India bowling
Bowler	Overs	Maidens	Runs	Wickets	Econ	Wides	NBs
Jasprit Bumrah	9	2	43	2	4.77	0	0
Mohammed Shami	7	1	47	1	6.71	3	0
Ravindra Jadeja	10	0	43	0	4.30	1	0
Kuldeep Yadav	10	0	56	0	5.60	0	0
Mohammed Siraj	7	0	45	1	6.42	0	0

== Broadcasting ==
The final match was broadcast live in India on Star Sports, free-to-air broadcaster DD Sports and free on OTT platform Disney+ Hotstar. In Australia the match was broadcast live on Fox Sports, Kayo Sports and in free to air on Nine Network and it's OTT platform 9Now.

The ICC also named the following panel of elite commentators for the final: Harsha Bhogle, Ian Bishop, Aaron Finch, Sunil Gavaskar, Matthew Hayden, Mark Howard, Nasser Hussain, Dinesh Karthik, Sanjay Manjrekar, Eoin Morgan, Kass Naidoo, Ricky Ponting, Ravi Shastri, Ian Smith and Shane Watson.

=== Viewership ===
According to Broadcast Audience Research Council (BARC) data, the final was watched by 300 million people on TV, with a peak concurrence of 130 million, making it the most-watched cricket match on TV. Disney+ Hotstar recorded a viewership of 59 million concurrent viewers, the most for any live sporting event on an OTT platform. The final was live-viewed globally for 87.6 billion minutes cumulatively through all media, becoming the most-watched ICC match ever.

== Closing ceremony ==
During the closing ceremony, a drone show was held along with huge fireworks. After this, Australia's Deputy Prime Minister Richard Marles, Indian Prime Minister Narendra Modi and BCCI Secretary Jay Shah presented the World Cup trophy to Australia's captain Pat Cummins.

== Aftermath ==
In the aftermath of the match, many supporters of the Indian team took to social media to troll and harass Australian players and their families. Some fans even sent death and rape threats directed at players and their families, resulting in many Australian players filing complaints with Cricket Australia and the ICC.

Harbhajan Singh, a former player on the Indian team, condemned the trolls, saying "Reports of trolling of family members of Australian cricket players is completely in bad taste. We played well but lost the final to better cricket by the Aussies. That's it. Why troll the players and their families? Requesting all cricket fans to stop such behaviour. Sanity and dignity are more important".
