= List of Cricket World Cup finals =

ICC Cricket World Cup

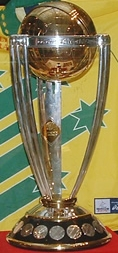
Cricket World Cup Trophy

The ICC Men's Cricket World Cup is an international cricket competition established in 1975. It is contested by the men's national teams of the members of the International Cricket Council (ICC), the sport's global governing body. The tournament generally takes place every four years. Most recently, the 2023 Cricket World Cup, hosted by India, was won by Australia, who beat India. The current trophy was instituted in 1999. It always remains with the ICC, and a replica is awarded to the winning team. For the 2019 and 2023 World Cups, the host nation and the seven other highest-ranked nations automatically qualify for the World Cup, while other nations including associate and affiliate ICC members play in a qualification tournament, the World Cup Qualifier. Though an associate member is yet to reach the final, Kenya did reach the semi-finals in 2003. Australia is the most successful team in the competition's history, winning six tournaments and finishing as runner-up twice. Twice, teams have won successive tournaments: the West Indies won the first two editions (1975 and 1979) and Australia won three in a row (1999, 2003, and 2007). Australia has played in the most finals (eight out of thirteen: 1975, 1987, 1996, 1999, 2003, 2007, 2015, and 2023). England has lost the most World Cup finals, ending as runner-up in all three final appearances before their victory in the 2019 tournament.

Of the twenty teams that have qualified for at least one Cricket World Cup, seven have contested a tournament final. Seven venues have hosted the final; only two of those – Lord's, in London, and the Melbourne Cricket Ground – have hosted multiple finals. India is the only country that has hosted a World Cup final at more than one venue, with Eden Gardens, Kolkata, hosting in 1987, Mumbai's Wankhede Stadium hosting in 2011 and Narendra Modi Stadium in Ahmedabad hosting in 2023.

== History ==
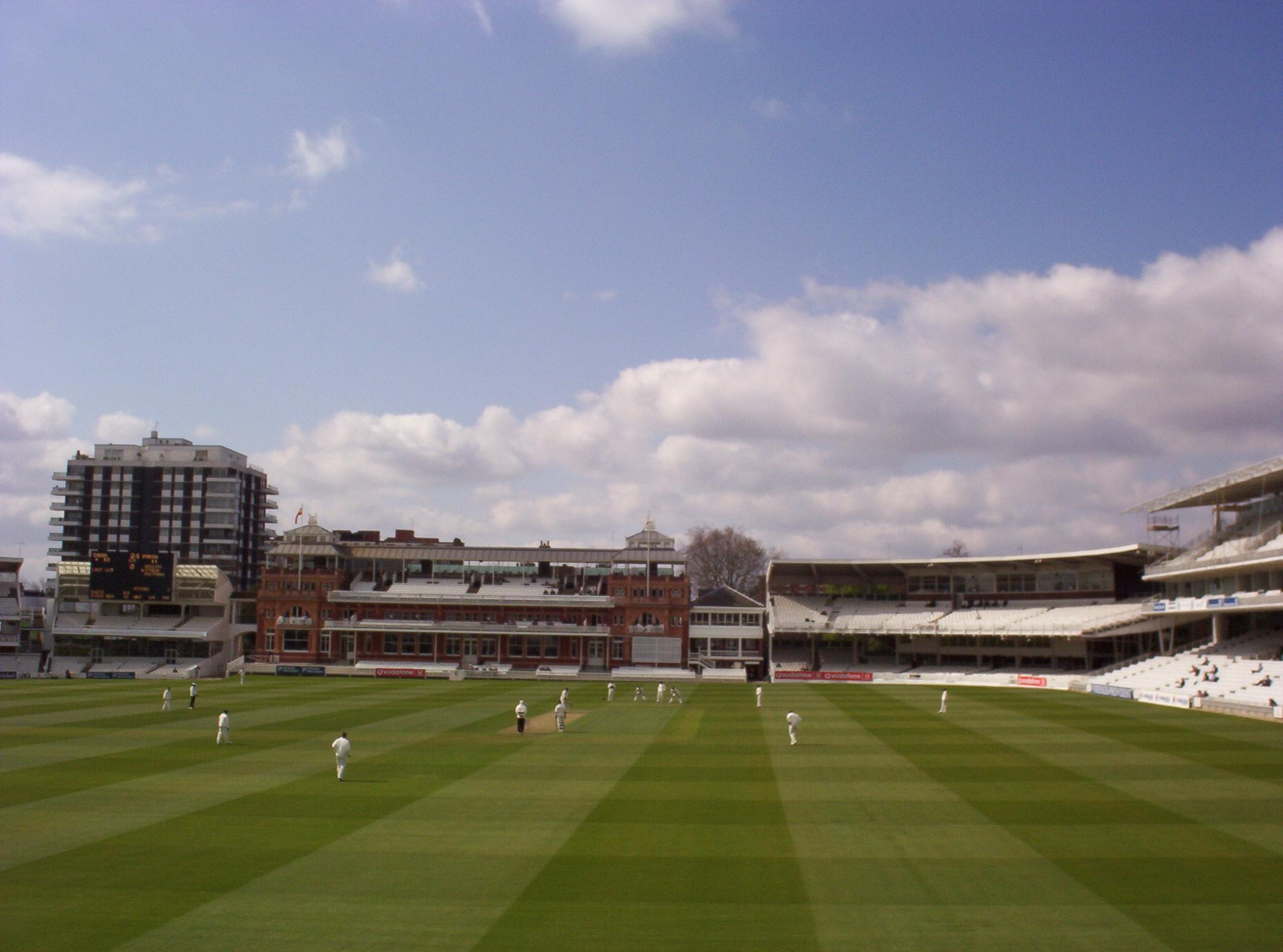
Lord's has hosted the final five times.

The inaugural ICC Cricket World Cup final was held on 21 June 1975 at Lord's, contested by Australia and the West Indies. A man of the match performance, including a century, from West Indian captain Clive Lloyd, coming in to bat at number five with his team at 50/3, formed the basis of a 149-run fourth-wicket partnership with Rohan Kanhai. Keith Boyce added a quick 34 and the Australians were set a target of 292 to win in 60 overs. In reply, Alan Turner hit 40 from 54 deliveries and Australian captain Ian Chappell scored 62 from 93 balls. Australia "contributed to their own destruction" in an innings with five run outs, and the West Indies were crowned the first cricket world champions, winning by 17 runs. Four years later, the West Indies qualified for the final, this time facing England, hosted at Lord's for the second consecutive tournament. An unbeaten 138 from Viv Richards, and support from Collis King in a 139-run partnership for the fifth wicket, saw the West Indies set England a target of 287 runs to win in 60 overs. A profitable but slow opening partnership between Mike Brearley and Geoffrey Boycott (the latter taking 17 overs to reach double figures) saw England to 129. However, following Brearley's dismissal, only Graham Gooch and Derek Randall made a "brief assault" on the West Indian bowling, before a batting collapse, Joel Garner taking five wickets in eleven balls. England ended 194 all out, and presented the West Indies with their second consecutive title, winning by 92 runs.

Lord's hosted the third World Cup final in June 1983; this was West Indies' third consecutive final. This time they faced India in front of 24,609 spectators. Sunil Gavaskar was dismissed early in the innings for two runs, and only Kris Srikkanth scored more than thirty; Andy Roberts took three wickets for the West Indies, leaving India all out for 183. After the dismissals of Viv Richards, Desmond Haynes and Larry Gomes by Madan Lal for six runs between them, the West Indies collapsed to 140 all out, handing the title to India by 43 runs. India and Pakistan co-hosted the 1987 tournament; the final was held at Eden Gardens in Kolkata between Australia and England, both appearing for the second time and vying for their first title. Australia won the toss and elected to bat first; David Boon scored 75 runs from 125 deliveries, while Mike Veletta made a rapid 45 from 31 deliveries, taking Australia to a total of 253/5 by the close of play, this time after 50 overs. In front of around 70,000 spectators, England's middle order of Bill Athey, Mike Gatting and Allan Lamb provided some resistance, but with 17 runs required in the final over to win, England fell short and lost by 7 runs.

The 1992 tournament was co-hosted by Australia and New Zealand, with the first ever day/night final being held at the Melbourne Cricket Ground in Australia between England and Pakistan. In their first final appearance, Pakistan won the toss and elected to bat first. Despite two early wickets from Derek Pringle, Pakistani batsmen Imran Khan and Javed Miandad shared a third-wicket partnership of 139. Both Inzamam-ul-Haq and Wasim Akram added over thirty runs each at more than a run-a-ball, leading Pakistan to a total of 249/6 in 50 overs. A crowd of over 87,000 saw man-of-the-match Wasim Akram take three of England's wickets, including that of all-rounder Ian Botham for a duck, after Graeme Hick was "baffled by the googly". England were bowled out for 227, and Pakistan won by 22 runs.

India, Pakistan and Sri Lanka hosted the tournament in 1996. It was Sri Lanka's first appearance in the final, and they faced 1987 champions Australia in another day/night contest. After winning the toss, Arjuna Ranatunga sent Australia in to bat at the Gaddafi Stadium in Lahore. Captain Mark Taylor and Ricky Ponting added 101 in their second-wicket partnership as Australia completed their 50 overs with 241/7. Man of the match Aravinda de Silva's century, assisted by partnerships with Asanka Gurusinha and Ranatunga, led Sri Lanka to the target with 22 balls and 7 wickets to spare, and their first win in the final. This was the first time a host won the title, though the final was played in Pakistan. It was also the first time that the team batting second emerged victorious.

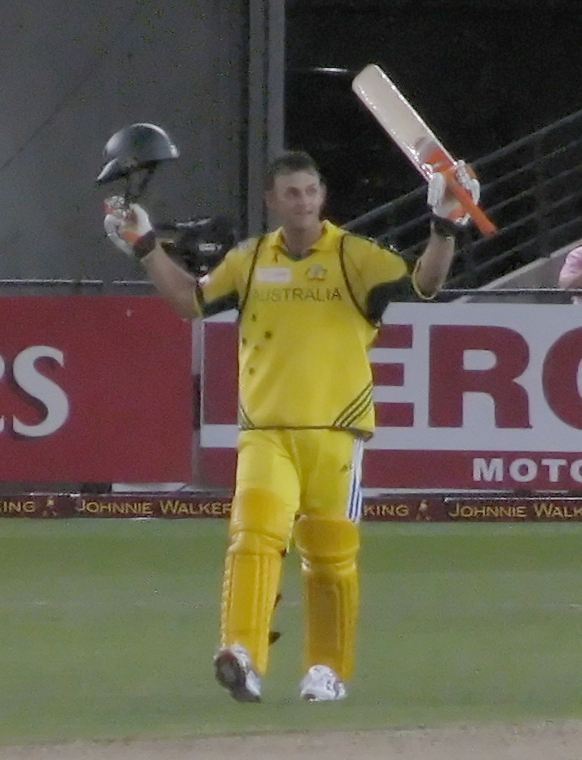
Australia's Adam Gilchrist made sizeable contributions with the bat in three consecutive finals.

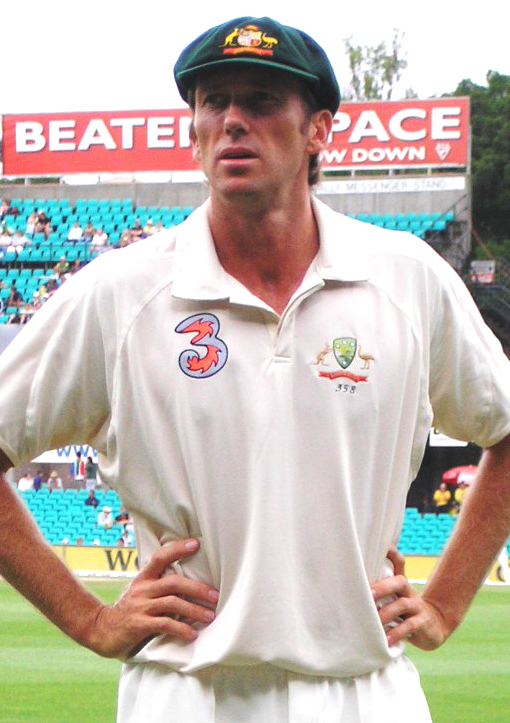
Australia's Glenn McGrath consistently led the bowling attack in four World Cup finals, making crucial breakthroughs in Australia's most successful World Cup era.

Australia's "12-year era of World Cup dominance" began with the 1999 tournament, hosted for the fourth time by England. In a "one-sided" final at Lord's, Shane Warne's four wickets helped to restrict Pakistan to 132 runs, all out with 11 overs yet to bat. A rapid fifty from Adam Gilchrist, and support from Mark Waugh, Ponting and Darren Lehmann, saw Australia reach the total in just over 20 overs, winning by eight wickets.

The 2003 tournament had three co-hosts: South Africa, Kenya and Zimbabwe, the final being a day/night match contested between Australia and India at the Wanderers Stadium in Johannesburg. Gilchrist and Matthew Hayden opened the batting, making a century partnership, before Ponting and Damien Martin went on to score the highest partnership in any World Cup final with an unbeaten 234. Australia batted out their fifty overs, and ended on the highest score in World Cup final history: 359/2. Player of the tournament Sachin Tendulkar was dismissed in the first over of India's reply but Virender Sehwag and Rahul Dravid combined to score 88 in their fourth wicket partnership. However, following Dravid's dismissal, India's batting collapsed, and they finished on 234 all out with nearly eleven overs remaining, handing Australia a 125-run victory.

The 2007 final, held at the Kensington Oval in Barbados, was reduced to 38 overs a side following a two-hour rain delay. Australia's Gilchrist hit the fastest century in a World Cup final at a strike rate of over 143 and his opening stand with Hayden became the largest first-wicket partnership in World Cup history. Australia ended on 281/4, an average of 7.39 runs per over. In reply, Sanath Jayasuriya and Kumar Sangakkara accumulated 116 runs for the second wicket, but with Chamara Silva the only other batsman to score over 20, Sri Lanka capitulated. Despite a revised target, due to a further rain break, calculated using the Duckworth–Lewis method, Sri Lanka scored 215–8 from their allotted overs. With a 53-run victory, Australia won their third consecutive World Cup.

Bangladesh, India and Sri Lanka co-hosted the 2011 tournament, with the latter pair meeting in the final in the Wankhede Stadium in Mumbai. Scoring 91 runs in their final 10 overs, Sri Lanka's innings ended on 274/6, Mahela Jayawardene top-scoring with an unbeaten 103. Sehwag was out leg before wicket to Lasith Malinga in the second ball of the Indian innings; Tendulkar soon followed him, but 97 from Gautam Gambhir and an unbeaten 91 from MS Dhoni saw India home with 10 balls to spare. By winning the match, India became the first team to win the finals on home soil.

The 2015 final, held at the Melbourne Cricket Ground, was won by hosts Australia. Their fast bowlers ripped through the New Zealand team, with Mitchell Starc bowling Brendon McCullum out for a duck and Mitchell Johnson taking three wickets. Despite the efforts of Grant Elliot, New Zealand were bowled out for 183. Steven Smith and Michael Clarke registered half-centuries as Australia won their fifth World Cup.

Four years later, the 2019 final, held at Lord's, was won by hosts England. England, playing in their first final in 27 years, defeated New Zealand to take the trophy. The Final was decided on a countback of boundaries scored in the match after both teams finished tied after normal play and again in a one over 'Super Over' designed to separate the teams.

This method of separating the Finalists was changed by the ICC after the match in favour of continuing with Super Overs until the teams can be separated.

The 2023 final, held at Narendra Modi Stadium, Australia won the match by 6 wickets with 42 balls left. Australia won the toss and chose to bowl first. India scored 240 runs in 50 overs and Australia scored 241 runs with 4 wickets, winning the Cricket World Cup for a record sixth time.

== List of finals ==
Key to list of finals
†	The final was played as a day/night game.
‡	The final was decided by the Duckworth–Lewis method.

- The ‘Year’ column refers to the year the World Cup was held, and links to the article about that tournament.
- The links in the ‘Result’ column point to the article about that tournament's final game.
- Links in the ’Winners’ and ’Runners-up’ columns point to the articles for the national cricket teams of the countries, not the articles for the countries.

Men's Cricket World Cup Finals
Year	Winner	Winner's score	Winning margin	Runner-up	Runner-up's score	Final venue	Attendance
1975	West Indies	291/8 (60 overs)	17 runs	Australia	274 all out (58.4 overs)	Lord's, London, England	24,000
1979	West Indies	286/9 (60 overs)	92 runs	England	194 all out (51 overs)	Lord's, London, England	32,000
1983	India	183 all out (55th over)	43 runs	West Indies	140 all out (52 overs)	Lord's, London, England	30,000
1987	Australia	253/5 (50 overs)	7 runs	England	246/8 (50 overs)	Eden Gardens, Kolkata, India	95,000
1992	Pakistan	249/6 (50 overs)	22 runs	England	227 all out (49.2 overs)	MCG, Melbourne, Australia †	87,182
1996	Sri Lanka	245/3 (46.2 overs)	7 wickets	Australia	241/7 (50 overs)	Gaddafi Stadium, Lahore, Pakistan †	62,645
1999	Australia	133/2 (20.1 overs)	8 wickets	Pakistan	132 all out (39 overs)	Lord's, London, England	30,000
2003	Australia	359/2 (50 overs)	125 runs	India	234 all out (39.2 overs)	Wanderers, Johannesburg, South Africa	32,827
2007	Australia	281/4 (38 overs)	53 runs ‡	Sri Lanka	215/8 (36 overs)	Kensington Oval, Bridgetown, Barbados	28,108
2011	India	277/4 (48.2 overs)	6 wickets	Sri Lanka	274/6 (50 overs)	Wankhede Stadium, Mumbai, India †	33,000
2015	Australia	186/3 (33.1 overs)	7 wickets	New Zealand	183 all out (45 overs)	MCG, Melbourne, Australia †	93,013
2019	England	241 all out (50 overs)	Tiebreak: 9 boundaries	New Zealand	241/8 (50 overs)	Lord's, London, England	30,000
2023	Australia	241/4 (43 overs)	6 wickets	India	240 all out (50 overs)	Narendra Modi Stadium, Ahmedabad, India †	92,453

== Results by country ==
National team	Winners	Years won	Runners-up	Years runners-up
Australia	6	1987, 1999, 2003, 2007, 2015, 2023	2	1975, 1996
India	2	1983, 2011	2	2003, 2023
West Indies	2	1975, 1979	1	1983
England	1	2019	3	1979, 1987, 1992
Sri Lanka	1	1996	2	2007, 2011
Pakistan	1	1992	1	1999
New Zealand	0	-	2	2015, 2019
