= Australia–India cricket rivalry =

Australia-India cricket rivalry

- 2023 Cricket World Cup final match between India and Australia.
- Sport: Cricket
- Teams: India; Australia
- First meeting: Test: 28 November-4 December 1947 (Australia won by an innings and 226 runs); ODI: 6 December 1980 (India won by 66 runs); T20I: 22 September 2007 (India won by 15 runs)
- Latest meeting: Test: 3-5 January 2025 (Australia won by 6 wickets); ODI: 25 October 2025 (India won by 9 wickets); T20I: 8 November 2025 (No result)
- Next meeting: Test: 21 January 2027; ODI: 7 October 2027; T20I TBD
- Trophy: India: 8; 2 Cricket World Cups; 3 T20 World Cups; 3 Champions Trophies; Australia: 10; 6 Cricket World Cups; 1 T20 World Cup; 2 Champions Trophies; 1 World Test Championship

Statistics
- Total meetings: Test: 112; ODI: 155; T20I: 37; Total: 304
- Most wins: Test: (Australia 48; India 33); ODI: (Australia 86; India 59); T20I: (India 22; Australia 12); Total: (Australia 146; India 114)

The Australia–India cricket rivalry is a big rivalry within the sport of cricket. The matches between the two countries are known for their intensity and competitiveness and are considered some of the biggest in the world.

== History ==
Australia and India first played Test cricket against each other in 1947, but it's over the last two decades that the rivalry has grown into one of the dominant duels in the game.

== Results ==
As of 8 November 2025

The two teams have played each other 304 times across formats, with Australia winning 146 matches and India winning 114.

Format	Matches played	India wins	Australia wins	Draw/No result
Test	112	33	**48**	31
ODI	155	59	**86**	10
T20I	37	**22**	12	3
Total	304	114	146	44

- **Bold** indicates most wins.

=== ICC matches ===
Australia has the better record in ICC Cricket World Cups, having faced India 14 times and won on nine occasions. In the 2003 Cricket World Cup, Australia defeated India in the final by 125 runs. Their most recent World Cup meeting was in the 2023 Cricket World Cup final played in Ahmedabad, where Australia defeated India by 6 wickets.

In ICC T20 World Cups, India has won four of the six matches against Australia, including winning a semi-final of the 2007 T20 World Cup by 15 runs.

In the ICC Champions Trophy, India has a superior head-to-head record against Australia, winning three of the four matches that ended in a result.

The two teams also played in the 2023 ICC World Test Championship final, which Australia won by 208 runs.

Head-to-head record in ICC events
Tournament	Matches played	India wins	Australia wins	Draw/No result
Cricket World Cup	14	5	**9**	0
T20 World Cup	6	**4**	2	0
Champions Trophy	5	**3**	1	1
World Test Championship Finals	1	0	**1**	0
Total	26	12	13	1

== ICC titles won ==
The two teams have played in all major ICC competitions, namely the Cricket World Cup, T20 World Cup, Champions Trophy, and World Test Championship. These major competitions are organised by the governing body of world cricket, the International Cricket Council (ICC).

Australia has won 10 ICC titles, comprising 6 Cricket World Cups, 1 T20 World Cup, 2 Champions Trophies, and 1 World Test Championship. In comparison, India has won 8 ICC titles, comprising 2 Cricket World Cups, 3 T20 World Cups, and 3 Champions Trophies.

ICC titles won
Tournament	India	Australia
ICC Cricket World Cup	2	6
ICC T20 World Cup	3	1
ICC Champions Trophy	3	2
ICC World Test Championship	0	1
Total ICC titles	8	10

=== ICC Cricket World Cups (head-to-head results) ===
Year	Stage	Venue	Result	Player of the match	Scorecard	Ref
1983	Group Stage	Trent Bridge, Nottingham, England	Australia won by 162 runs	(Australia) Trevor Chappell	Scorecard	
1983	Group Stage	County Ground, Chelmsford, England	India won by 118 runs	(India) Roger Binny	Scorecard	
1987	Group Stage	MA Chidambaram Stadium, Chennai, India	Australia won by 1 runs	(Australia) Geoff Marsh	Scorecard	
1987	Group Stage	Arun Jaitley Cricket Stadium, Delhi, India	India won by 56 runs	(India) Mohammad Azharuddin	Scorecard	
1992	Group Stage	The Gabba, Brisbane, Australia	Australia won by 1 runs	(Australia) Dean Jones	Scorecard	
1996	Group Stage	Wankhede Stadium, Mumbai, India	Australia won by 16 runs	(Australia) Mark Waugh	Scorecard	
1999	Group Stage	The Oval, London, England	Australia won by 77 runs	(Australia) Glenn McGrath	Scorecard	
2003	Group Stage	Centurion Park, Centurion, South Africa	Australia won by 9 wickets	(Australia) Jason Gillespie	Scorecard	
2003	Final	Wanderers Stadium, Johannesburg, South Africa	Australia won by 125 runs	(Australia) Ricky Ponting	Scorecard	
2011	Quarter-Final	Sardar Patel Stadium, Ahmedabad, India	India won by 5 wickets	(India) Yuvraj Singh	Scorecard	
2015	Semi-Final	Sydney Cricket Ground, Sydney, Australia	Australia won by 95 runs	(Australia) Steven Smith	Scorecard	
2019	Group Stage	The Oval, London, England	India won by 36 runs	(India) Shikhar Dhawan	Scorecard	
2023	Group Stage	MA Chidambaram Stadium, Chennai, India	India won by 6 wickets	(India) KL Rahul	Scorecard	
2023	Final	Narendra Modi Stadium, Ahmedabad, India	Australia won by 6 wickets	(Australia) Travis Head	Scorecard	

=== ICC Men's T20 World Cups (head-to-head results) ===
Year	Stage	Venue	Result	Player of the match	Scorecard	Ref
2007	Semi-Final	Kingsmead Cricket Ground, Durban, South Africa	India won by 15 runs	(India) Yuvraj Singh	Scorecard	
2010	Super 8s	Kensington Oval, Bridgetown, Barbados	Australia won by 49 runs	(Australia) David Warner	Scorecard	
2012	Super 8s	R. Premadasa Stadium, Colombo, Sri Lanka	Australia won by 9 wickets	(Australia) Shane Watson	Scorecard	
2014	Super 10	Sher-e-Bangla Stadium, Dhaka, Bangladesh	India won by 73 runs	(India) Ravichandran Ashwin	Scorecard	
2016	Super 10	Inderjit Singh Bindra Stadium, Mohali, India	India won by 6 wickets	(India) Virat Kohli	Scorecard	
2024	Super 8	Daren Sammy Ground, Gros Islet, Saint Lucia	India won by 24 runs	(India) Rohit Sharma	Scorecard	

=== ICC Champions Trophy (head-to-head results) ===
Year	Stage	Venue	Result	Player of the match	Scorecard	Ref
1998	Quarter-final	Bangabandhu National Stadium, Dhaka, Bangladesh	India won by 44 runs	(India) Sachin Tendulkar	Scorecard	
2000	Quarter-final	Gymkhana Club Ground, Nairobi, Kenya	India won by 20 runs	(India) Yuvraj Singh	Scorecard	
2006	Group stage	Punjab Cricket Association Stadium, Mohali, India	Australia won by 6 wickets	(Australia) Damien Martyn	Scorecard	
2009	Group stage	SuperSport Park, Centurion, South Africa	No result		Scorecard	
2025	Semi-final	Dubai International Cricket Stadium, Dubai, UAE	India won by 4 wickets	(India) Virat Kohli	Scorecard	

== List of Test series ==
Series	Season	Host team	Tests	Australia	India	Drawn	Tied	Australia Captain	India Captain	Result	Most runs and wkts	Player of the series
1	1947–48	Australia	5	4	0	1	0	Don Bradman	Lala Amarnath	Australia	Don Bradman (715 runs); Ray Lindwall (18 wkts)	
2	1956–57	India	3	2	0	1	0	Ian Johnson; Ray Lindwall (2nd test)	Polly Umrigar	Australia	Neil Harvey (253 runs); Richie Benaud (23 wkts)	
3	1959–60	India	5	2	1	2	0	Richie Benaud	Gulabrai Ramchand	Australia	Nari Contractor (438 runs); Richie Benaud (29 wkts)	
4	1964–65	India	3	1	1	1	0	Bob Simpson	Mansoor Ali Khan Pataudi	Drawn	Bob Simpson (292 runs); Bapu Nadkarni (17 wkts)	
5	1967–68	Australia	4	4	0	0	0	Bob Simpson (1st, 2nd tests); Bill Lawry	Chandu Borde (1st test) Mansoor Ali Khan Pataudi	Australia	Bob Cowper (485 runs); E.A.S. Prasanna (17 wkts)	
6	1969–70	India	5	3	1	1	0	Bill Lawry	Mansoor Ali Khan Pataudi	Australia	Keith Stackpole (368 runs); Ashley Mallett (17 wkts)	
7	1977–78	Australia	5	3	2	0	0	Bob Simpson	Bishan Singh Bedi	Australia	Bob Simpson (539 runs); Bishan Bedi (31 wkts)	
8	1979–80	India	6	0	2	4	0	Kim Hughes	Sunil Gavaskar	India	Kim Hughes (594 runs); Kapil Dev (28 wkts)	
9	1980–81	Australia	3	1	1	1	0	Greg Chappell	Sunil Gavaskar	Drawn	Greg Chappell(368 runs) Dennis Lillee(21 wkts)	
10	1985–86	Australia	3	0	0	3	0	Allan Border	Kapil Dev	Drawn	Sunil Gavaskar(356 runs) Shivlal Yadav(15 wkts)	
11	1986–87	India	3	0	0	2	1	Allan Border	Kapil Dev	Drawn	Dean Jones (371 runs) Greg Matthews (14 wkts)	
12	1991–92	Australia	5	4	0	1	0	Allan Border	Mohammad Azharuddin	Australia	David Boon (556 runs) Craig McDermott (31 wkts)	
13	1996–97	India	1	0	1	0	0	Mark Taylor	Sachin Tendulkar	India	Nayan Mongia (152 runs ) Anil Kumble (9 wkts)	(India) Nayan Mongia
14	1997–98	India	3	1	2	0	0	Mark Taylor	Mohd Azharuddin	India	Sachin Tendulkar (446 runs) Anil Kumble (23 wkts)	(India) Sachin Tendulkar
15	1999–2000	Australia	3	3	0	0	0	Steve Waugh	Sachin Tendulkar	Australia	Ricky Ponting (375 runs) Glenn McGrath (18 wkts)	(India) Sachin Tendulkar
16	2000–01	India	3	1	2	0	0	Steve Waugh	Sourav Ganguly	India	Matthew Hayden (549 runs) Harbhajan Singh (32 wkts)	(India) Harbhajan Singh
17	2003–04	Australia	4	1	1	2	0	Steve Waugh	Sourav Ganguly	Drawn	Ricky Ponting (706 runs) Anil Kumble (24 wkts)	(India) Rahul Dravid
18	2004–05	India	4	2	1	1	0	Adam Gilchrist (1-3 Tests); Ricky Ponting (4th Test)	Sourav Ganguly (1st, 2nd Tests); Rahul Dravid (3rd, 4th Tests)	Australia	Damien Martyn (444 runs) Anil Kumble (27 wickets)	(Australia) Damien Martyn
19	2007–08	Australia	4	2	1	1	0	Ricky Ponting	Anil Kumble	Australia	Sachin Tendulkar (493 runs) Brett Lee (24 wkts)	(Australia) Brett Lee
20	2008–09	India	4	0	2	2	0	Ricky Ponting	Anil Kumble (1st and 3rd tests); MS Dhoni(2nd and 4th tests)	India	Gautam Gambhir (463 runs) Ishant Sharma (15 wkts) Harbhajan Singh (15 wkts)	(India) Ishant Sharma
21	2010–11	India	2	0	2	0	0	Ricky Ponting	MS Dhoni	India	Sachin Tendulkar (403 runs) Zaheer Khan (12 wkts)	(India) Sachin Tendulkar
22	2011–12	Australia	4	4	0	0	0	Michael Clarke	MS Dhoni (1st–3rd Tests); Virender Sehwag (4th Test)	Australia	Michael Clarke (626 runs) Ben Hilfenhaus (27 wkts)	(Australia) Michael Clarke
23	2012–13	India	4	0	4	0	0	Michael Clarke; Shane Watson (4th test)	MS Dhoni	India	Murali Vijay (430 runs) Ravichandran Ashwin (29 wkts)	(India) Ravichandran Ashwin
24	2014–15	Australia	4	2	0	2	0	Michael Clarke (1st test); Steve Smith	Virat Kohli (1st, 4th tests); MS Dhoni (2nd, 3rd tests)	Australia	Steve Smith (769 runs) Nathan Lyon (23 wkts)	(Australia) Steve Smith
25	2016–17	India	4	1	2	1	0	Steve Smith	Virat Kohli; Ajinkya Rahane (4th test)	India	Steve Smith (499 runs) Ravindra Jadeja (25 wkts)	(India) Ravindra Jadeja
26	2018–19	Australia	4	1	2	1	0	Tim Paine	Virat Kohli	India	Cheteshwar Pujara (521 runs) Jasprit Bumrah(21 wkts) Nathan Lyon(21 wkts)	(India) Cheteshwar Pujara
27	2020–21	Australia	4	1	2	1	0	Tim Paine	Virat Kohli (1st test); Ajinkya Rahane	India	Marnus Labuschagne (426 runs) Pat Cummins (21 wkts)	(Australia) Pat Cummins
28	2022–23	India	4	1	2	1	0	Pat Cummins; Steve Smith (3rd & 4th tests)	Rohit Sharma	India	Usman Khawaja (333 runs); Ravichandran Ashwin (25 wkts)	(India) Ravindra Jadeja (India) Ravichandran Ashwin
29	2024–25	Australia	5	3	1	1	0	Pat Cummins	Rohit Sharma(2nd - 4th Tests); Jasprit Bumrah(1st & 5th tests)	Australia	Travis Head(448 runs); Jasprit Bumrah(32 wkts)	(India) Jasprit Bumrah

== See also ==
- The Ashes – International cricket series
