= 2015 Cricket World Cup final =

Cricket match

2015 Cricket World Cup Final
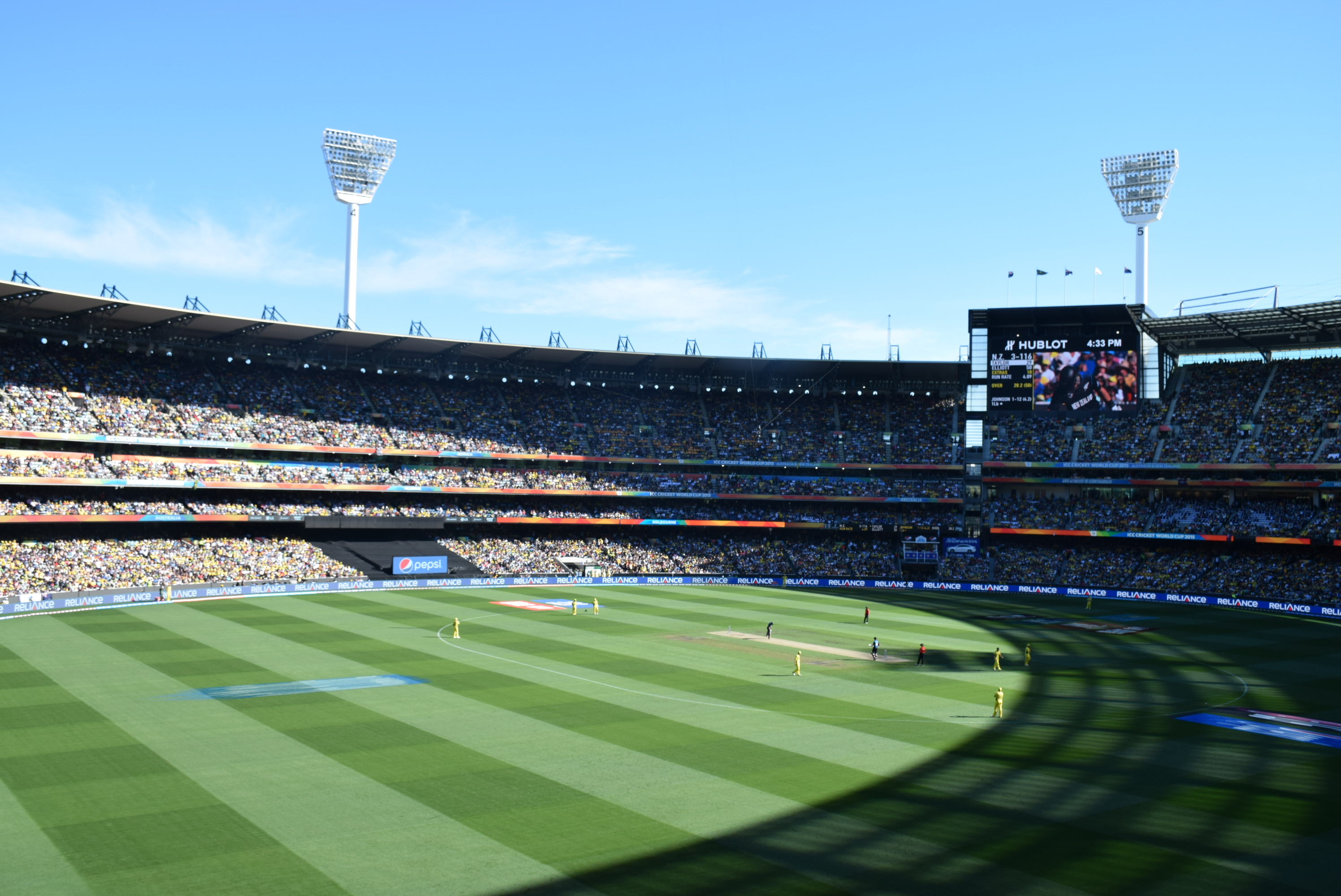
- The MCG during the final.
- Event: 2015 Cricket World Cup
New Zealand	Australia
(New Zealand)	(Australia)
183	186/3
45 overs	33.1 overs
- Australia won by 7 wickets
- Date: 29 March 2015
- Venue: Melbourne Cricket Ground, Melbourne
- Player of the match: James Faulkner (Aus)
- Umpires: Kumar Dharmasena (SL) and Richard Kettleborough (Eng)
- Attendance: 93,013

The final of the 2015 Cricket World Cup took place on 29 March 2015 at the Melbourne Cricket Ground in Melbourne. It was played between the tournament's two co-hosts, New Zealand and Australia. Australia went into the game as favourites and won by 7 wickets for a fifth World Cup triumph. The match was played in front of 93,013 spectators, a record crowd for a day of cricket in Australia.

== Background ==
The 2015 Cricket World Cup started on 14 February and was co-hosted by New Zealand and Australia across 14 venues. Fourteen teams were divided into two pools of seven, with the top four from each pool progressing to the quarter-finals. The final was played on 29 March and was a day-night match contested between New Zealand and Australia at the Melbourne Cricket Ground.

It was New Zealand's first World Cup Final. They had previously lost the semi-final on six occasions between 1975 and 2011. Australia played in their record seventh final, having won four (1987, 1999, 2003 and 2007) and lost two (1975, 1996).

It was the second consecutive time that two co-hosts contested the final: in 2011, India defeated Sri Lanka in the final while a third co-host Bangladesh exited in the pool stages. It was also the first time since 1987 that there was no Asian team in the final.

The match was also the last One Day International (ODI) for Australian captain Michael Clarke (who announced that he would retire before the match), Brad Haddin, and New Zealand's Daniel Vettori, the latter two announcing their retirements after the match.

== Road to the final ==
=== New Zealand ===
New Zealand finished top of Pool A, winning all six games against Sri Lanka, Scotland, England, Australia, Afghanistan and Bangladesh. They faced the West Indies in the quarter-final at the Wellington Regional Stadium, winning by 143 runs. Martin Guptil scored 237 individual runs when New Zealand batted, the highest score at any World Cup and the second highest in ODI matches. In the semi-final at Auckland's Eden Park by 4 wickets in a rain-affected match against South Africa, with Grant Elliott hitting a six off the penultimate ball to win the game.

=== Australia ===
Australia finished second in Pool A, losing against New Zealand, having a game cancelled due to rain against Bangladesh and winning their other four matches. In their quarter-final, they defeated Pakistan by 6 wickets at the Adelaide Oval, with Josh Hazlewood taking 4 wickets to help restrict Pakistan to 213 runs. They then qualified for the final by beating defending champions India by 95 runs in the semi-final at the Sydney Cricket Ground. Man of the match was Steven Smith, who scored 105 runs for Australia.

== Buildup ==
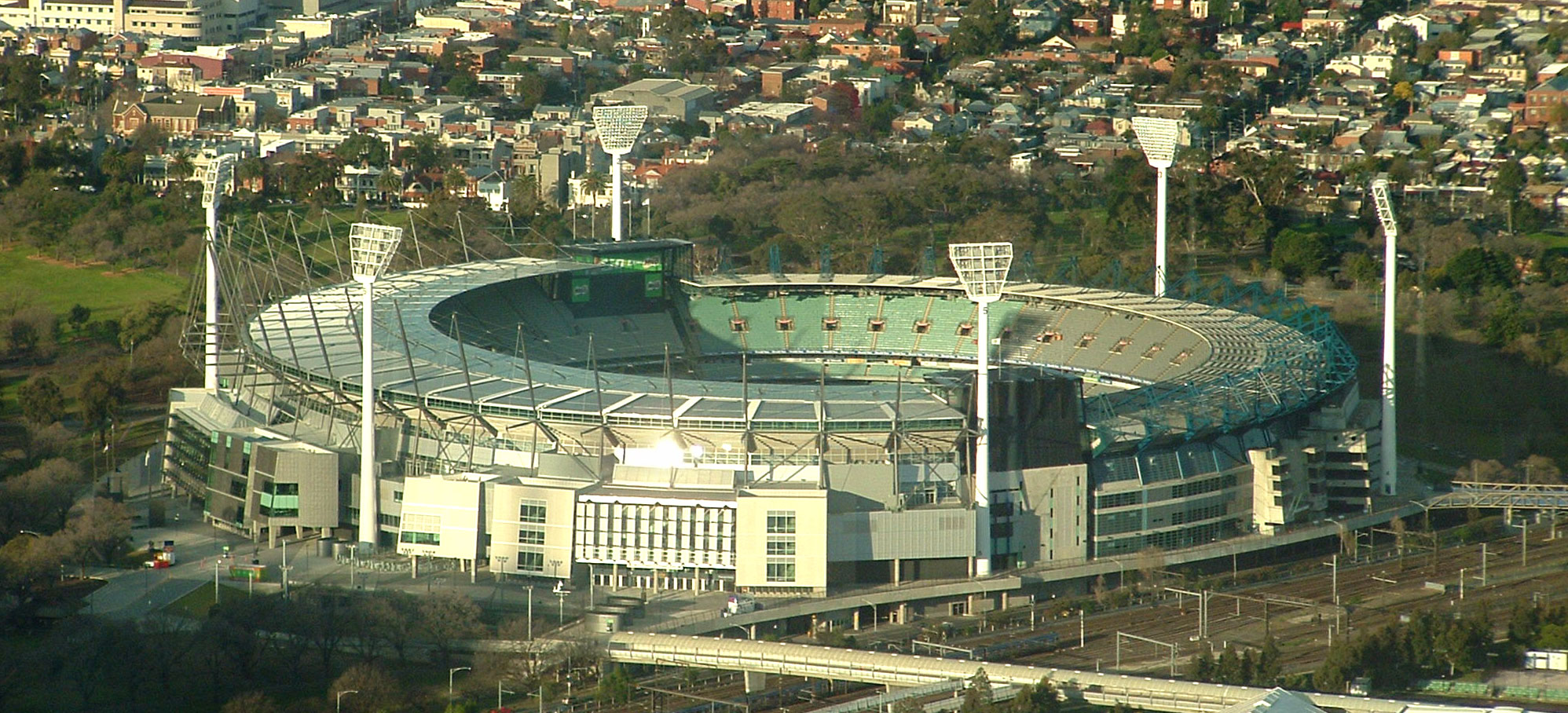
The Melbourne Cricket Ground, venue for the final

Australia entered the final as strong favourites to win. Australia had a strong record at home, winning 24 of their last 26 games and former Australian cricketer Matthew Hayden suggested New Zealand would struggle with the larger field size at the Melbourne Cricket Ground (MCG), especially after playing all their tournament games on the smaller New Zealand grounds. Additionally, Australia had a much stronger record at the World Cup, having already won it four times. At the MCG Australia had won their last six matches, although they did lose the last time they played New Zealand there in 2009. Former Australia captain Ricky Ponting stated that Australia were overwhelming favourites and one could not find a weakness in the Australian team.

New Zealand's captain, Brendon McCullum, maintained an aggressive approach throughout the tournament, and said the final match would be no different. Australia's captain Michael Clarke said the loss against New Zealand during the group stages gave his side the "kick up the backside" they needed.

== Match ==
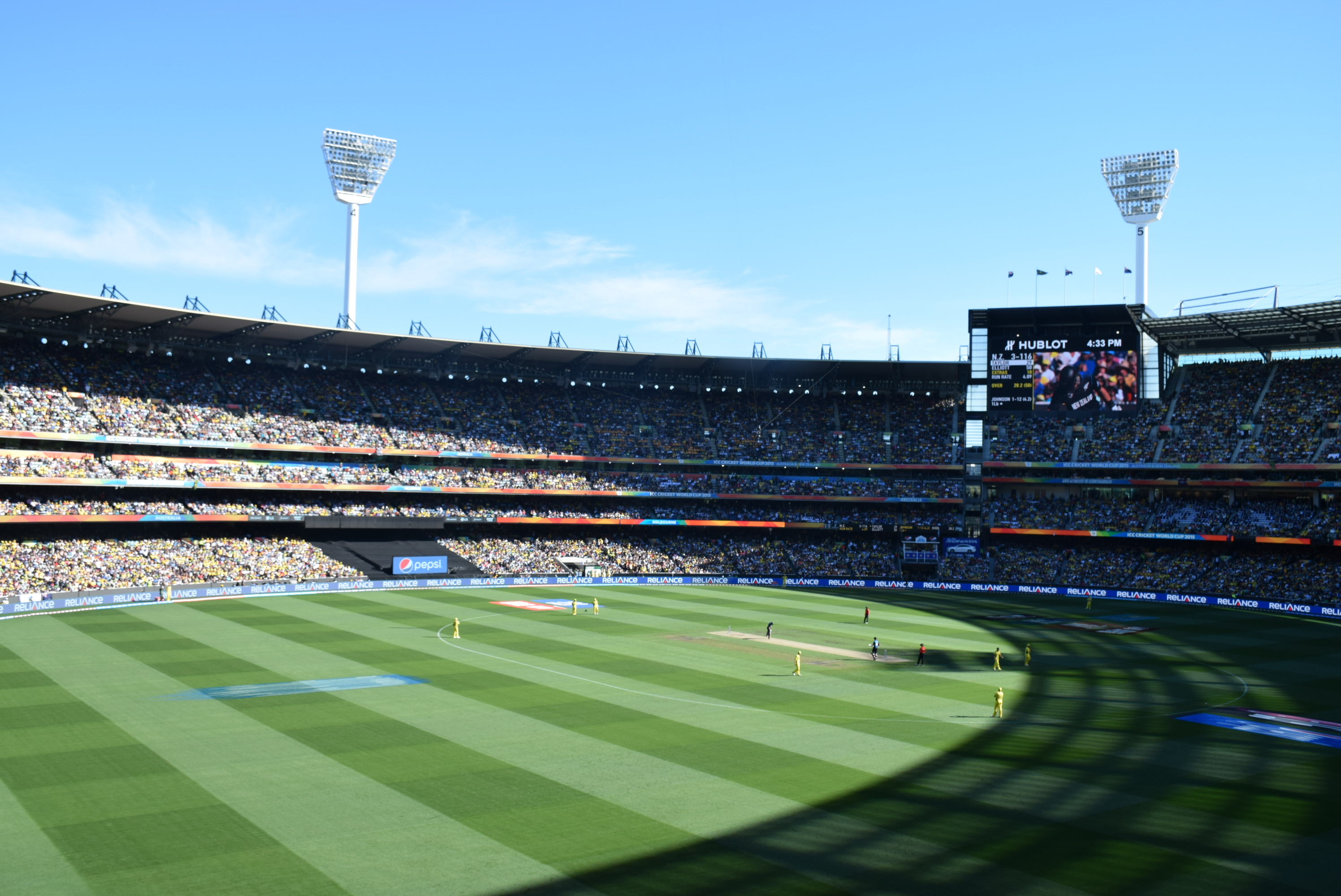
MCG during the final of the World Cup

=== Match officials ===
The match was umpired by Sri Lanka's Kumar Dharmasena and England's Richard Kettleborough, both of whom were on the Elite Panel of ICC Umpires. Kettleborough was named the ICC umpire of the year in 2013 and 2014 with Dharmasena winning the award in 2012. Dharmasena was part of the Sri Lanka team which won the 1996 final against Australia, and became the first person to feature in the final as a player and as an umpire. Sri Lankan Ranjan Madugalle was the match referee, South Africa's Marais Erasmus was the TV umpire and former England ODI international cricketer Ian Gould was the fourth umpire.

- On-field umpires: Kumar Dharmasena (SL) and Richard Kettleborough (Eng)
- TV umpire: Marais Erasmus (SA)
- Reserve umpire: Ian Gould (Eng)
- Match referee: Ranjan Madugalle (SL)

=== Details ===
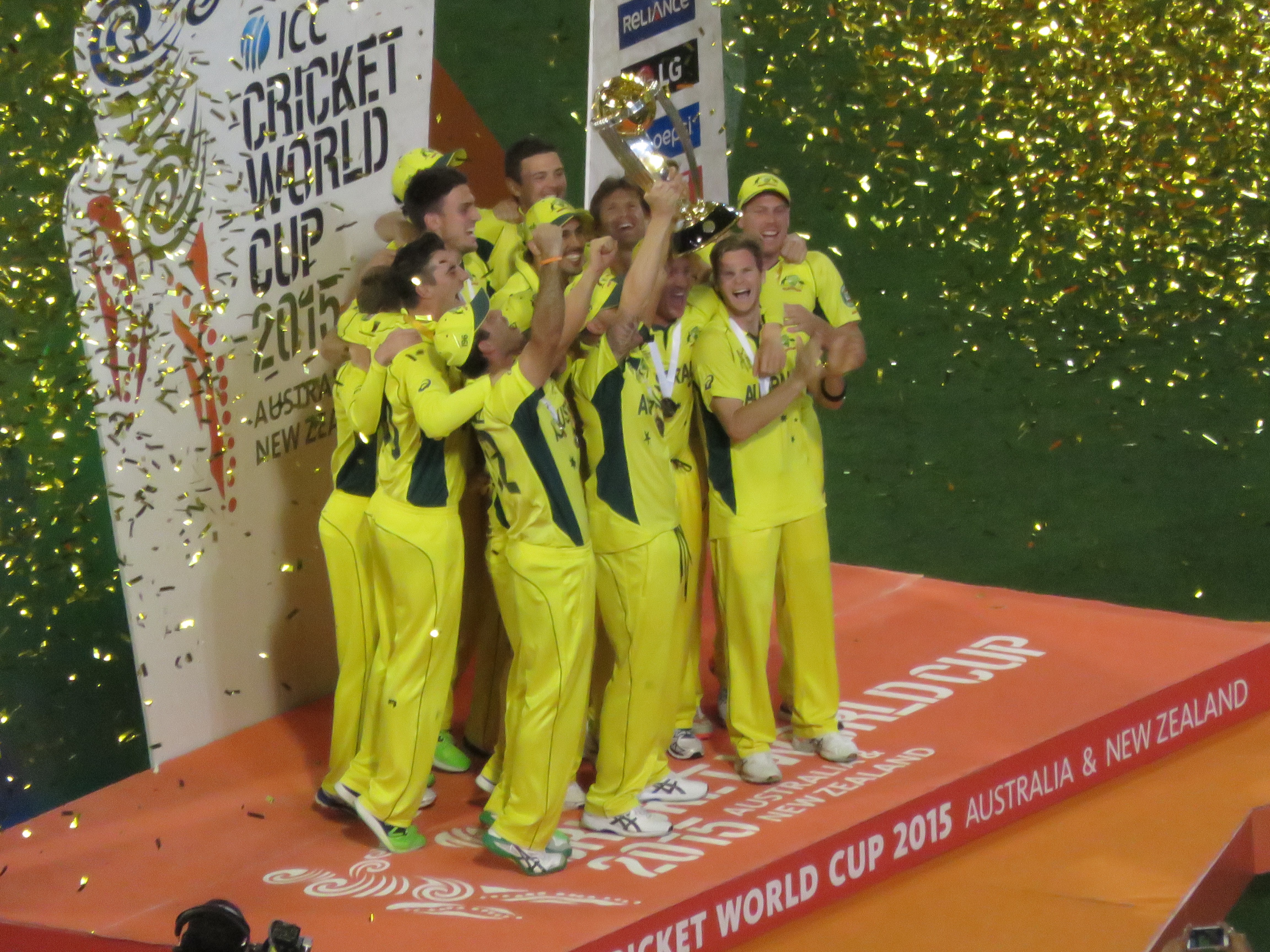
Australian players celebrating after receiving the trophy

New Zealand won the toss and elected to bat. Brendon McCullum was bowled in the fifth ball of the first over by Mitchell Starc. By the time the second wicket had fallen, that of Martin Guptill, New Zealand were making slow progress and were 38 for 2 from 12 overs. Kane Williamson was caught and bowled the following over by Mitchell Johnson for 12 runs, followed by a maiden from Josh Hazlewood. By the halfway mark, New Zealand were 93 for 3 with Grant Elliott on 39 and Ross Taylor on 20. Taylor lasted until the 36th over when he was caught behind off the bowling of James Faulkner for 40. Faulkner enhanced his wicket maiden by bowling Corey Anderson for a duck, with New Zealand on 150 for 5 after 36 overs. Clarke caught Luke Ronchi from Starc's bowling for a duck and Daniel Vettori was dismissed three overs later for eight, leaving New Zealand on 167 for 7 from 41 overs. Elliot fell to Faulkner the following over, caught by Brad Haddin for 83, leaving both Matt Henry and Tim Southee at the crease on zero. Both were dismissed in the 45th over, Henry caught by Starc off Johnson and Southee run out. New Zealand's innings closed with them 183 all out.

Australia's start was equally ignominious with Aaron Finch being caught and bowled by Trent Boult in the second over for a duck. By the end of the 10th over, Australia were 56 for 1, with David Warner on 39 and Steve Smith on 13. Warner was dismissed in the 13th over for 45, being caught by Elliott off the bowling of Henry but Australia remained resolute to end the 20th over on 98 for 2, Clarke on 21 and the steady Smith on 25. By the end of the 30th over, Clarke, who received the majority of deliveries, was on 57 while Smith had 47. Clarke was dismissed in the 32nd, bowled by Henry for 74, but by now Australia required just nine runs from 113 deliveries. Shane Watson came in to support Smith as he struck the winning shot, a four off Henry from the first ball of the 34th over, to win the match by seven wickets.

Australian captain Clarke dedicated the victory to Phillip Hughes who had died after being struck on the neck by a bouncer the previous November.

29 March 2015
14:30 (D/N)
Scorecard

New Zealand; 183 (45 overs)	v	Australia; 186/3 (33.1 overs)
Grant Elliott 83 (82); Mitchell Johnson 3/30 (9 overs)		Michael Clarke 74 (72); Matt Henry 2/46 (9.1 overs)

Australia won by 7 wickets
Melbourne Cricket Ground, Melbourne
Umpires: Kumar Dharmasena (SL) and Richard Kettleborough (Eng)
Player of the match: James Faulkner (Aus)

- New Zealand won the toss and elected to bat.
- Australia won the Cricket World Cup for the fifth time.
- This was the last ODI played by Michael Clarke (Aus), Brad Haddin (Aus), Daniel Vettori (NZ) and Mitchell Johnson (Aus).
- The crowd of 93,013 was the largest in the history of cricket in Australia, beating the previous record of 91,112 for a Test match on 26 December 2013. The country's previous ODI record crowd was 87,182 for the 1992 final.
Final scorecard

1st innings

New Zealand batting
Player	Status	Runs	Balls	4s	6s	Strike rate
Martin Guptill	b Maxwell	15	34	1	1	44.11
Brendon McCullum	b Starc	0	3	0	0	0.00
Kane Williamson	c & b Johnson	12	33	1	0	36.36
Ross Taylor	c Haddin b Faulkner	40	72	2	0	55.55
Grant Elliott	c Haddin b Faulkner	83	82	7	1	101.21
Corey Anderson	b Faulkner	0	2	0	0	0.00
Luke Ronchi	c Clarke b Starc	0	4	0	0	0.00
Daniel Vettori	b Johnson	9	21	1	0	42.85
Tim Southee	run out (Maxwell)	11	11	0	1	100.00
Matt Henry	c Starc b Johnson	0	7	0	0	0.00
Trent Boult	not out	0	1	0	0	0.00
Extras	(lb 7, w 6)	13				
Total	(all out; 45 overs)	183				

Fall of wickets: 1/1 (McCullum, 0.5 ov), 2/33 (Guptill, 11.2 ov), 3/39 (Williamson, 12.2 ov), 4/150 (Taylor, 35.1 ov), 5/150 (Anderson, 35.3 ov), 6/151 (Ronchi, 36.2 ov), 7/167 (Vettori, 40.6 ov), 8/171 (Elliott, 41.5 ov), 9/182 (Henry, 44.5 ov), 10/183 (Southee, 44.6 ov)

Australia bowling
Bowler	Overs	Maidens	Runs	Wickets	Econ	Wides	NBs
Mitchell Starc	8	0	20	2	2.50	1	0
Josh Hazlewood	8	2	30	0	3.75	0	0
Mitchell Johnson	9	0	30	3	3.33	2	0
Glenn Maxwell	7	0	37	1	5.28	1	0
James Faulkner	9	1	36	3	4.00	0	0
Shane Watson	4	0	23	0	5.75	2	0

2nd innings

Australia batting
Player	Status	Runs	Balls	4s	6s	Strike rate
David Warner	c Elliott b Henry	45	46	7	0	97.82
Aaron Finch	c & b Boult	0	5	0	0	0.00
Steve Smith	not out	56	71	3	0	78.87
Michael Clarke	b Henry	74	72	10	1	102.77
Shane Watson	not out	2	5	0	0	40.00
Glenn Maxwell						
James Faulkner						
Brad Haddin						
Mitchell Johnson						
Mitchell Starc						
Josh Hazlewood						
Extras	(lb 3, w 6)	9				
Total	(3 wickets; 33.1 overs)	186				

Fall of wickets: 1/2 (Finch, 1.4 ov), 2/63 (Warner, 12.2 ov), 3/175 (Clarke, 31.1 ov)

New Zealand bowling
Bowler	Overs	Maidens	Runs	Wickets	Econ	Wides	NBs
Tim Southee	8	0	65	0	8.12	3	0
Trent Boult	10	0	40	1	4.00	0	0
Daniel Vettori	5	0	25	0	5.00	0	0
Matt Henry	9.1	0	46	2	5.01	2	0
Corey Anderson	1	0	7	0	7.00	1	0
