= 2023 World Cup final =

2023 World Cup final may refer to:

- 2023 Cricket World Cup final
- 2023 FIFA Women's World Cup Final
- 2023 Rugby World Cup final
