= Richard Kettleborough =

English cricket umpire (born 1973)

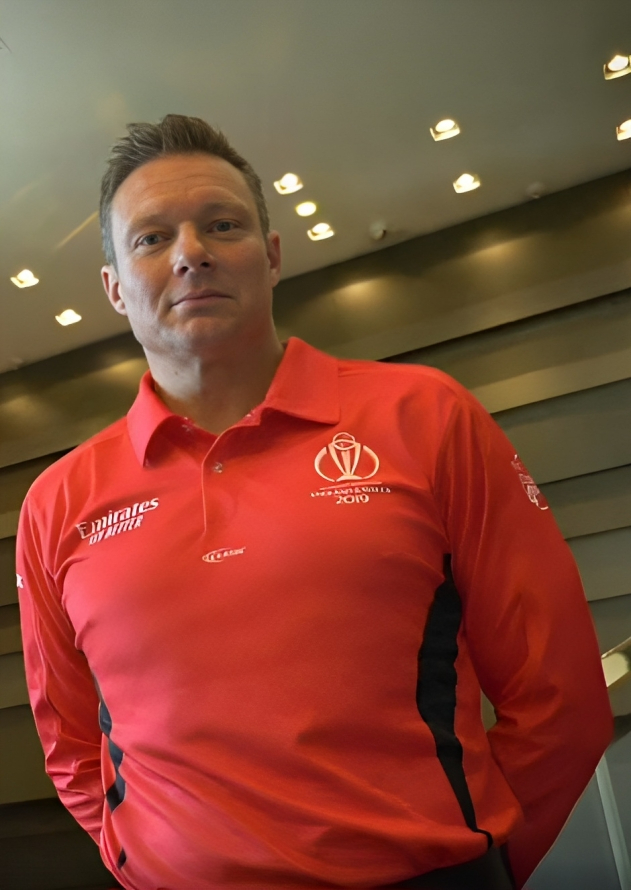
- Richard Kettleborough in 2019

Personal information
- Full name: Richard Allan Kettleborough
- Born: 15 March 1973 (age 53); Sheffield, Yorkshire, England
- Height: 5 ft 10 in (1.78 m)
- Batting: Left-handed
- Bowling: Right-arm fast-medium
- Role: Batsman

Domestic team information
- Years: Team
- 1994–1997: Yorkshire
- 1998–1999: Middlesex
- FC debut: 16 June 1994 Yorkshire v Northamptonshire
- Last FC: 9 September 1999 Middlesex v Surrey

Umpiring information
- Tests umpired: 100 (2010–2026)
- ODIs umpired: 114 (2009–2025)
- T20Is umpired: 46 (2009–2026)
- WODIs umpired: 4 (2002–2007)
- WT20Is umpired: 2 (2007–2011)

Career statistics
Competition	First-class	List A
Matches	33	21
Runs scored	1,500	507
Batting average	25.16	24.16
100s/50s	1/7	0/1
Top score	108	58
Balls bowled	378	270
Wickets	3	6
Bowling average	81.00	38.33
5 wickets in innings	0	0
10 wickets in match	0	0
Best bowling	2/26	2/43
Catches/stumpings	20/–	6/–
- Source: Cricinfo, 23 November 2023

Richard Allan Kettleborough (born 15 March 1973) is an English international cricket umpire, and former first-class cricketer who appeared in 33 first-class matches for Yorkshire and Middlesex. He was a left-handed top order batsman and occasional right-arm medium pace bowler. He attended Worksop College and was a member of the college cricket XI for a number of years.

Having been appointed to the ECB list of first-class umpires in 2006, he officiated with Ian Gould in an international Twenty20 between England and Australia in August 2009 and was subsequently elevated to the full International Panel of ICC Umpires in November 2009 and the Elite Panel of ICC Umpires in May 2011. He won the ICC Umpire of the year (David Shepherd Trophy) in 2013, 2014 and 2015.

== Playing career ==
Kettleborough made his debut for Yorkshire in 1994, and scored his only century in 1996 against Essex. He played for the Tykes until 1997 when, after failing to establish a permanent place in the first team, he moved to Middlesex for two further seasons. In 2000, he appeared for the Yorkshire Cricket Board in one day cricket and helped his club, Sheffield Collegiate, win both the Yorkshire ECB County Premier League and the National Club Championship. Kettleborough toured Australia with a Marylebone Cricket Club (MCC) team in 2002.

After progressing through the Yorkshire age group set up, he scored 1,258 runs in his first-class career, with one century and an average of 25.16 and took 20 catches. In 21 List A games he scored 290 runs at 24.16. Kettleborough took three first-class wickets at 81.00 and six one-day wickets at 38.33.

== Umpiring career ==
Kettleborough's debut as an umpire in first-class cricket came in April 2002, during the match between Durham and Durham UCCE. They followed this up over the next two years with further university matches, and two tour matches (involving Sri Lankans and Indians). In May 2004, they stood on his first County Championship match, Durham against Essex.

Kettleborough became a member of the ECB First-class list of umpires in 2006, and has taken charge of a number of showpiece domestic matches, including a semi-final in the 2009 Friends Provident Trophy, finals day of the Twenty20 Cup in 2009 and the final of the Clydesdale Bank 40 in 2010.

He was the ECB's designated TV umpire on the ICC International Panel for the 2009 season. He was appointed to stand in his first T20I as umpire between England and Australia in August 2009. He later umpired his 1st One Day International between the same sides a month later. In November 2009, he was promoted to on-field status within the International Panel. Kettleborough made his debut as a Test cricket umpire in a Test between Sri Lanka and West Indies at Galle in November 2010. He went on to stand in 4 matches at the Cricket World Cup 2011, and gained promotion to the Elite Panel of ICC Umpires in May 2011.

He was one of the twenty umpires to stand in matches during the 2015 Cricket World Cup and umpired in the Final played between the co-hosts Australia and New Zealand at the historic MCG on 29 March 2015. During the 2017 ICC Champions Trophy held in England and Wales, he stood in the semi-final between Bangladesh and India at the Edgbaston Cricket Ground in Birmingham on 15 June 2017. Kettleborough went on to stand in the 2017 ICC Champions Trophy Final between arch-rivals India and Pakistan at The Oval in London on 18 June 2017.

In April 2019, he was named as one of the sixteen umpires to stand in matches during the 2019 Cricket World Cup. In July 2019, he was named as one of the two on-field umpires for the first semi-final match, between India and New Zealand. In June 2021, Kettleborough was named as the TV umpire for the 2021 ICC World Test Championship Final.

He was named as one of the sixteen match officials for 2023 Cricket World Cup. He officiated in 5 group stage matches and in the semi final between Australia and South Africa. He was also named on-field umpire for the final, for the second time after he officiated as one of the on-field umpires in 2015 Cricket World Cup Final. He also served as the third umpire in the final of the 2024 ICC Men's T20 World Cup.

== See also ==
- List of Test cricket umpires
- List of One Day International cricket umpires
- List of Twenty20 International cricket umpires
