= 2007 Cricket World Cup final =

2007 ICC Cricket World Cup Final
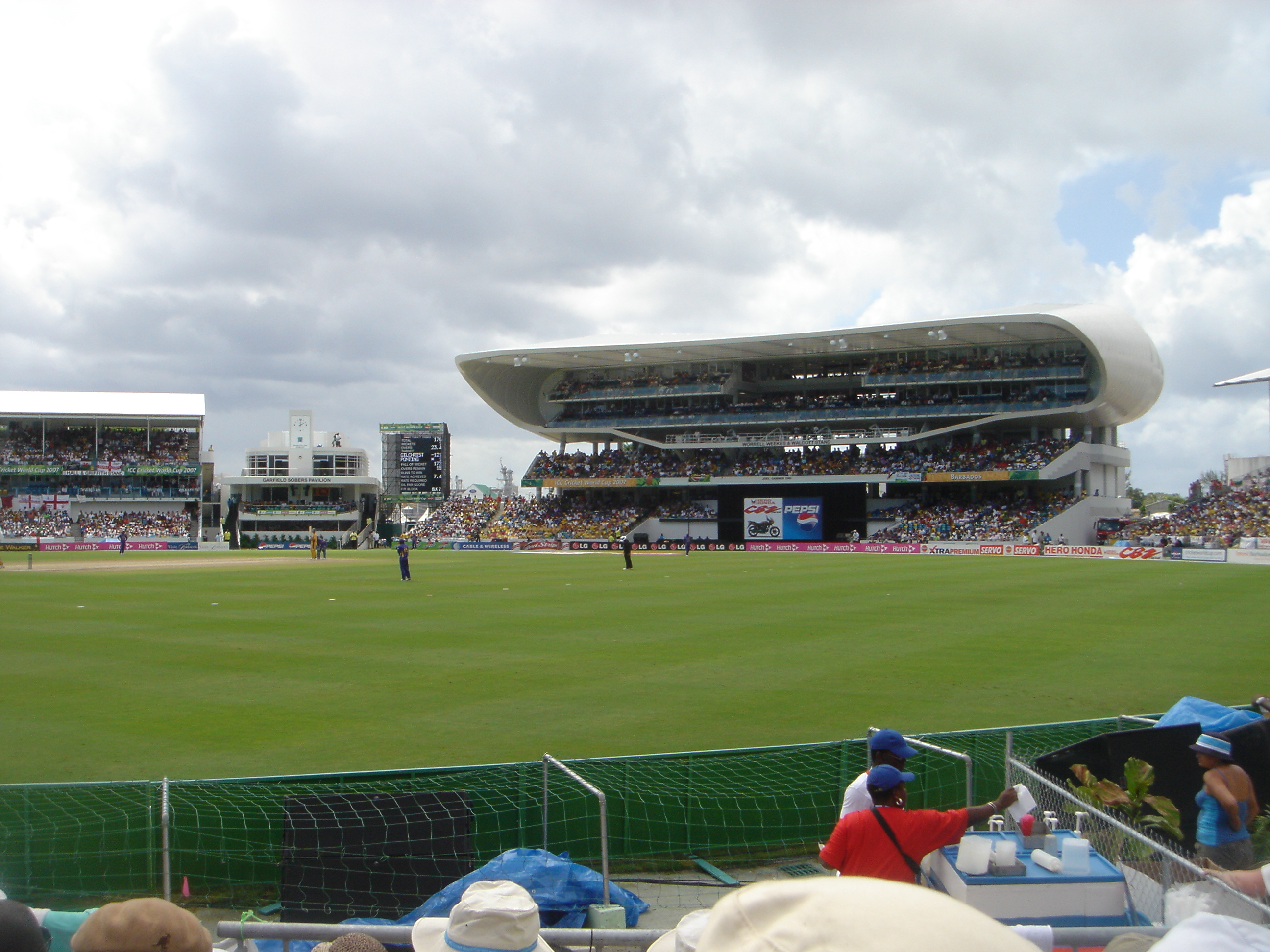
- Kensington Oval during the Final of 2007 Cricket World Cup between Sri Lanka and Australia
- Event: 2007 ICC Cricket World Cup
Australia	Sri Lanka
(Australia)	(Sri Lanka)
281/4	215/8
38 overs	36 overs
- Australia won by 53 runs (D/L method)
- Date: 28 April 2007
- Venue: Kensington Oval, Bridgetown
- Player of the match: Adam Gilchrist (Aus)
- Umpires: Steve Bucknor (WI) and Aleem Dar (Pak)
- Attendance: 28,108

The 2007 Cricket World Cup final was played on 28 April 2007 at Kensington Oval in Barbados to determine the winner of the ninth installment of the Cricket World Cup. This was the first time that Barbados hosted a Cricket World Cup final. Australia defeated Sri Lanka by 53 runs (under the Duckworth–Lewis method) to win their 4th World Cup title and 3rd in succession. It was the second time that Australia and Sri Lanka played a World Cup final against each other, after 1996.

== Road to the final ==
Sri Lanka

Sri Lanka started their world cup campaign with victories over Bermuda, Bangladesh and India and became the table toppers of Group B. In the Super-8 stage they finished second as they had defeated West Indies, England, New Zealand and Ireland. However, they lost two of their matches to South Africa and Australia each. In the semi finals, they defeated New Zealand by 81 runs, and qualified for the final second time after 1996.

Australia

Australia had dominated the tournament from the first match to the semi finals. They started their world cup campaign with victories over Scotland, Netherlands and South Africa and became the table toppers of Group A. In the Super-8 stage also they finished at the top as they had defeated West Indies, Bangladesh, England, Ireland, Sri Lanka and New Zealand. In the semi-finals, they defeated South Africa by 7 wickets, and qualified for the final for a record sixth time after 1975, 1987, 1996, 1999 and 2003.

== Match details ==
=== Match officials ===
- On-field umpires: Steve Bucknor (WI) and Aleem Dar (Pak)
- Third umpire: Rudi Koertzen (SA)
- Reserve umpire: Billy Bowden (NZ)
- Match referee: Jeff Crowe (NZ)

=== Summary ===
This was the first World Cup final to be a repeat – the teams previously met in the 1996 World Cup Final, which Sri Lanka won. Australia has won every World Cup match against Sri Lanka apart from that loss. The match was Sri Lanka's second World Cup final appearance and Australia's sixth, their fourth in a row.

Both teams remained unchanged from their semi-final matches. Australia's captain Ricky Ponting won the toss and elected to bat first. However, the start of play was delayed due to rain, and the match was reduced to 38 overs per side. Adam Gilchrist's score of 149 – the highest in a World Cup final – helped give Australia an imposing total of 281.

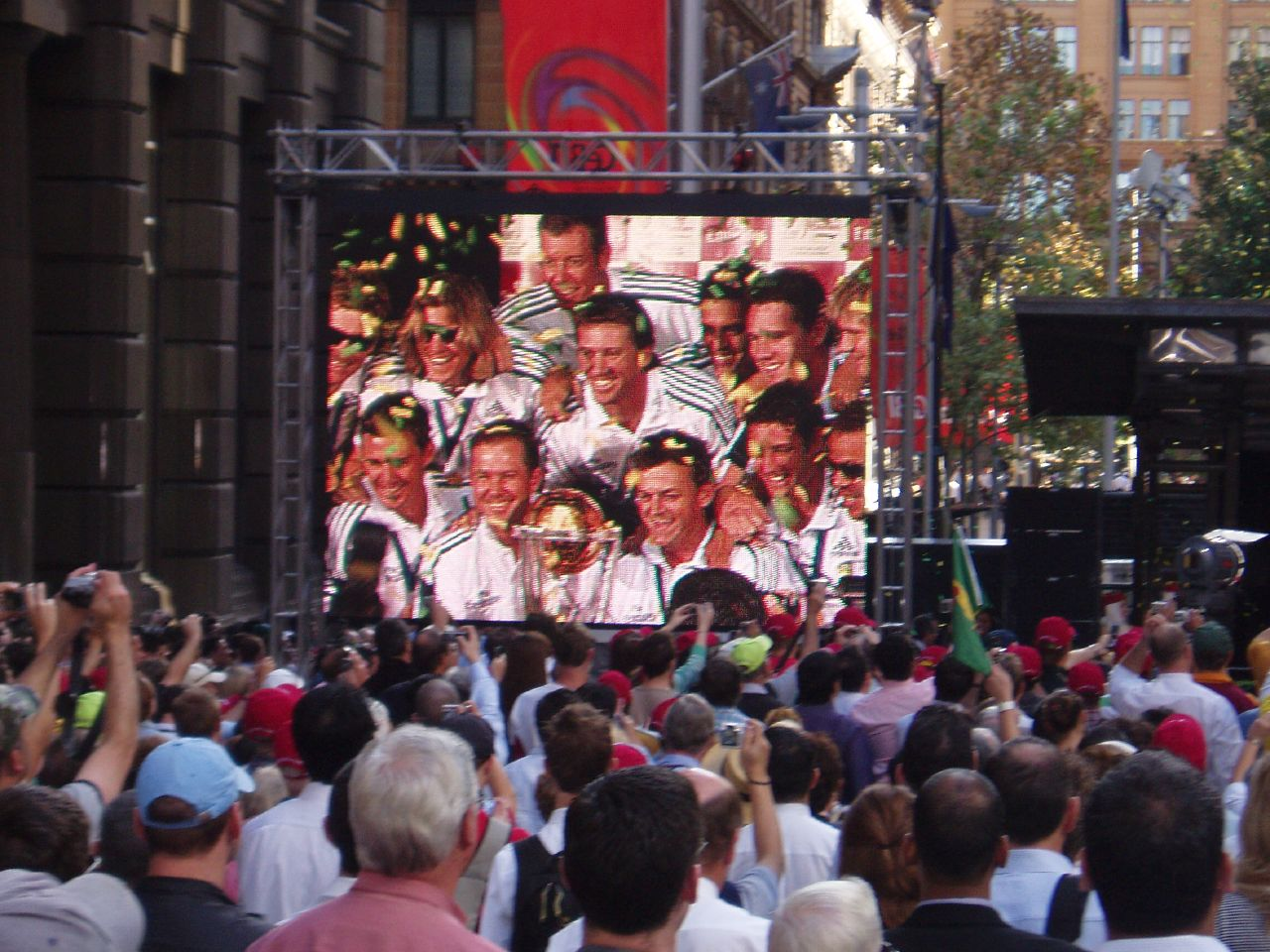
A large crowd of over 10,000 fans welcome the Australian team on completing the first World Cup hat-trick – Martin Place, Sydney.

Sri Lankan batsmen Kumar Sangakkara and Sanath Jayasuriya added 116 for the second wicket, before falling with the score at 123 and 145 respectively. Despite the regular loss of wickets, Sri Lanka managed to maintain a run rate of over 6 an over. Further rain forced the reduction of Sri Lanka's innings to just 36 overs, with the target revised to 269. At the culmination of the 33rd over, with Sri Lanka still trailing the adjusted Duckworth-Lewis target by 37 runs, the umpires suspended the game due to bad light.

While Australia's players began to celebrate their victory (since the minimum 20 overs had been reached), the umpires incorrectly announced that because the match was suspended due to light and not rain, the final three overs would have to be bowled the following day. With Sri Lanka needing 61 runs from 18 deliveries, Jayawardene agreed there was no need to return the following day, and instructed his team to resume batting, with Ponting agreeing to bowl only spinners. The last three overs were played in almost complete darkness, during which Sri Lanka added nine runs, giving Australia a 53-run victory via the Duckworth–Lewis method. The umpires later apologised for their error, and stated that the match should have ended then with Australia winning by 37 runs.

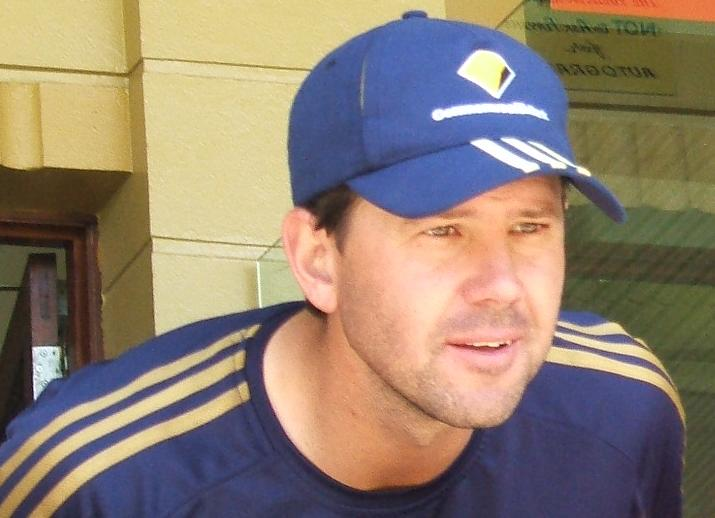
Australian captain Ricky Ponting

Australia won the tournament undefeated, and established a streak of 29 World Cup games without a loss. Australian bowler Glenn McGrath was named Player of the Series and retired from all forms of international cricket.

28 April
Scorecard

Australia; 281/4 (38 overs)	v	Sri Lanka; 215/8 (36 overs)
Adam Gilchrist 149 (104); Lasith Malinga 2/49 (8 overs)		Sanath Jayasuriya 63 (67); Michael Clarke 2/33 (5 overs)

Australia won by 53 runs (D/L method)
Kensington Oval, Bridgetown
Umpires: Steve Bucknor (WI) and Aleem Dar (Pak)
Player of the match: Adam Gilchrist (Aus)

- Australia won the toss and elected to bat.
- The match was reduced to 38 overs per side due to rain.
- Sri Lanka were set a revised target of 269 runs from 36 overs.
- With this victory, Australia became the first team to win three consecutive World Cup titles.
- Glenn McGrath (Aus) played in his last ODI match.

== Scorecard ==
1st innings

Australia batting
Player	Status	Runs	Balls	4s	6s	Strike rate
Adam Gilchrist	c Silva b Fernando	149	104	13	8	143.26
Matthew Hayden	c Jayawardene b Malinga	38	55	3	1	69.09
Ricky Ponting	run out (Jayawardene)	37	42	1	1	88.09
Andrew Symonds	not out	23	21	2	0	109.52
Shane Watson	b Malinga	3	3	0	0	100.00
Michael Clarke	not out	8	6	1	0	133.33
Michael Hussey						
Brad Hogg						
Nathan Bracken						
Shaun Tait						
Glenn McGrath						
Extras	(lb 4, w 16, nb 3)	23				
Total	(4 wickets; 38 overs)	281				

Fall of wickets: 1/172 (Hayden, 22.5 ov), 2/224 (Gilchrist, 30.3 ov), 3/261 (Ponting, 35.4 ov), 4/266 (Watson, 36.2 ov)

Sri Lanka bowling
Bowler	Overs	Maidens	Runs	Wickets	Econ	Wides	NBs
Chaminda Vaas	8	0	54	0	6.75	1	2
Lasith Malinga	8	1	49	2	6.12	0	0
Dilhara Fernando	8	0	74	1	9.25	4	1
Muttiah Muralitharan	7	0	44	0	6.28	2	0
Tillakaratne Dilshan	2	0	23	0	11.50	1	0
Sanath Jayasuriya	5	0	33	0	6.60	0	0

2nd innings

Sri Lanka batting
Player	Status	Runs	Balls	4s	6s	Strike rate
Upul Tharanga	c Gilchrist b Bracken	6	8	1	0	75.00
Sanath Jayasuriya	b Clarke	63	67	9	0	94.02
Kumar Sangakkara	c Ponting b Hogg	54	52	6	1	103.84
Mahela Jayawardene	lbw b Watson	19	19	1	0	100.00
Chamara Silva	b Clarke	21	22	1	1	95.45
Tillakaratne Dilshan	run out (Clarke/McGrath)	14	13	2	0	107.69
Russel Arnold	c Gilchrist b McGrath	1	2	0	0	50.00
Chaminda Vaas	not out	11	21	0	0	52.38
Lasith Malinga	st Gilchrist b Symonds	10	6	0	1	166.66
Dilhara Fernando	not out	1	6	0	0	16.66
Muttiah Muralitharan						
Extras	(lb 1, w 14)	15				
Total	(8 wickets; 36 overs)	215				

Fall of wickets: 1/7 (Tharanga, 2.1 ov), 2/123 (Sangakkara, 19.5 ov), 3/145 (Jayasuriya, 22.6 ov), 4/156 (Jayawardene, 25.5 ov), 5/188 (Dilshan, 29.6 ov), 6/190 (Silva, 30.1 ov), 7/194 (Arnold, 31.5 ov), 8/211 (Malinga, 33.6 ov)

Australia bowling
Bowler	Overs	Maidens	Runs	Wickets	Econ	Wides	NBs
Nathan Bracken	6	1	34	1	5.66	1	0
Shaun Tait	6	0	42	0	7.00	2	0
Glenn McGrath	7	0	31	1	4.42	1	0
Shane Watson	7	0	49	1	7.00	3	0
Brad Hogg	3	0	19	1	6.33	0	0
Michael Clarke	5	0	33	2	6.60	2	0
Andrew Symonds	2	0	6	1	3.00	0	0

== Criticism of umpires ==
While the majority of the tournament passed without any major criticism of the umpires or errors on their part, the final was wrought with confusion and was described as a "farcical finish" to the competition.

Rain affected the start of the match, reducing the contest to 38 overs a team, and further rain reduced the Sri Lankan innings to 36 overs. With Australia almost certain victors with just 3 overs to go, bad light began to affect play and the umpires seemed to offer the Sri Lankans the opportunity to leave the field for bad light. Both teams assumed this would have granted Australia victory that evening, but they were soon informed that if the light improved the match would have to continue; and if not then the final 3 overs would be played the next day. Sri Lanka's batsmen eventually came out and played out the final 3 overs regardless, and Australia were eventually crowned champions.

Match referee Jeff Crowe revealed a "communication breakdown" between himself, on-field umpires Aleem Dar and Steve Bucknor and third umpire Rudi Koertzen was to blame for the mix-up, which overlooked Law 21 of the laws of cricket. The law states that, in a One Day International, providing a minimum of 20 overs have been played then a result can be reached using the Duckworth-Lewis system.

The ICC issued a statement apologising for occurrence of the incident, but said that none of those involved would be sacked. Two months later it was announced that all five officials involved - the two on field umpires, the third and fourth umpires and the match referee - were to be reprimanded by suspension to prevent them officiating in the 2007 World Twenty20.
