= 2003 Cricket World Cup final =

Cricket match held in Johannesburg

2003 ICC Cricket World Cup Final
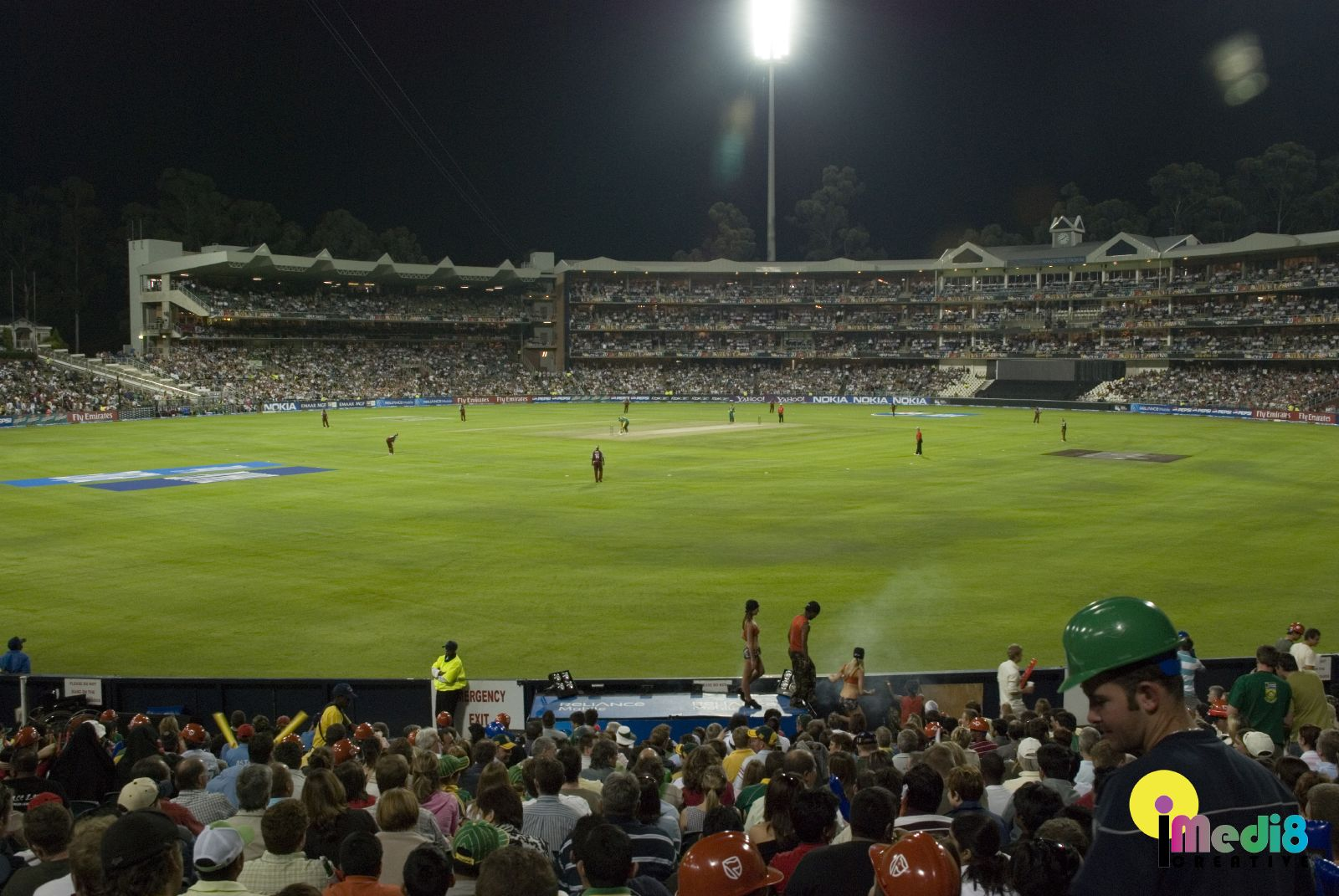
- The Wanderers Stadium, Johannesburg
- Event: 2003 ICC Cricket World Cup
| Australia | India |
| (Australia) | (India) |
| 359/2 | 234 |
| 50 overs | 39.2 overs |
- Australia won by 125 runs
- Date: 23 March 2003
- Venue: Wanderers Stadium, Johannesburg
- Player of the match: Ricky Ponting (Aus)
- Umpires: Steve Bucknor (WI) and David Shepherd (Eng)
- Attendance: 34,000 (Note: This figure is according to ESPNcricinfo. The Wisden Cricketers' Almanack puts the number at 31,827.)

The 2003 Cricket World Cup Final was a One Day International (ODI) match played on 23 March 2003 at the Wanderers Stadium in Johannesburg, South Africa. It marked the culmination of the 2003 Cricket World Cup, the eighth edition of the tournament. It was the first time these two teams had met at this stage of a World Cup. For defending champions Australia it was their fifth World Cup final, while for India it was the second after their 1983 victory. Australia won the match by 125 runs to claim the title for the third time.

Both teams had progressed through three stages to reach the final. Australia was unbeaten thus far, while India had lost one game—against Australia in the first stage. Australia—led by Ricky Ponting—entered the game as firm favourites. After winning the toss, India captain Sourav Ganguly decided to field first. The Australian opening pair, Adam Gilchrist and Matthew Hayden, added 105 runs in 14 overs. After their dismissals, Ponting (140 not out) and Damien Martyn (88 not out) were involved in a partnership of 234 runs, then an Australian record, and took the total to 359 runs for 2 at the end of the innings. Harbhajan Singh took two of the Australian wickets, conceding 49 runs.

In response, India lost their key batsman, Sachin Tendulkar, at the start of the innings. Despite a brief interruption by rain after the 17th over, no time was lost from the game. Once play resumed, India lost wickets at regular intervals. Virender Sehwag top-scored for India with 82 runs, before the team's innings ended for 234 all out in the 40th over. For Australia, Glenn McGrath took three wickets for 52 runs, while Brett Lee and Andrew Symonds claimed two wickets each. Ponting was named man of the match for his 140 not out, and Tendulkar, the tournament's leading run-scorer (673 runs), was awarded the man of the series. The final was Australia's seventeenth successive ODI win, a record, and they were the first team to win three World Cups. Ganguly's decision to bowl first in the match was criticised by journalists and former cricketers.

== Background ==
=== Format ===
The 2003 Cricket World Cup was the eighth World Cup, organised by the International Cricket Council (ICC). The competition took place between 9 February and 23 March 2003, lasting 43 days. Co-hosted by South Africa, Zimbabwe and Kenya, the tournament was the first World Cup to be played in Africa. There were 14 participating teams, the largest number in a World Cup until then. As well as the 10 Test-playing nations, four associate teams took part. Kenya, by virtue of its ODI status, automatically qualified for the tournament; Canada, Namibia and Netherlands—the top three teams of the 2001 ICC Trophy—formed the rest.

The structure of the tournament was similar to that of the 1999 World Cup. The 14 countries were separated into two groups of seven; each team played the others in its group once. The most successful three from each group qualified for the Super Sixes stage, a format which was introduced in the 1999 tournament. Each qualifier carried forward their points from the first stage and played one game against each of the three teams from the other group. The top four teams from the Super Sixes qualified for the semi-finals, and the winners of those matches contested the final. A total of 54 matches were played in the tournament.

The matches were played according to the standard rules of a One Day International (ODI). Each side batted for a maximum of 50 overs, (Note: The maximum overs per side was reduced from 60 to 50 overs during the 1987 World Cup.) and fielding restrictions applied for the bowling side. For the first 15 overs only two fielders were allowed outside the infield, and for the rest of the innings four fielders (including a bowler and the wicket-keeper) had to be deployed in the infield. No player was allowed to bowl more than 10 overs in an innings.

=== Squads ===
The Australian Cricket Board announced their squad for the World Cup on 31 December 2002, but several changes were made to the team before the tournament was completed. In January 2003, Shane Watson was ruled out following a stress fracture and was replaced by Ian Harvey. A day before the tournament started, Australia's key spinner Shane Warne was found guilty of using a prohibited diuretic drug during an ODI series held in Australia before the World Cup. He was sent home after he tested positive, and banned from playing for one year. Later, Australia's fast bowler Jason Gillespie was ruled out from the tournament following a tendon injury. Warne and Gillespie were replaced by Nathan Hauritz (on 24 February 2003) and Nathan Bracken (on 5 March 2003), respectively. An ongoing dispute between the Board for Control of Cricket in India (BCCI) and the Indian players over product endorsements ensured a delay in the announcement of a provisional squad for the World Cup. The BCCI announced the final selection of 15 members on 31 December 2002. Sachin Tendulkar made into the final squad despite three ongoing injuries, including a major one on the ankle.

Having won 15 out of their 18 ODIs leading up the start of the tournament, the defending champions Australia were deemed one of the favourites to reach the semi-finals. They had previously won the 1987 and 1999 tournaments. In contrast, some commentators considered it doubtful whether India would qualify for the Super Sixes stage. They had won the competition once, in 1983, but had recently lost an ODI series against West Indies at home, and were defeated heavily in their tour of New Zealand.

== Route to the final ==
=== Group stage ===
Australia and India were both in Pool A of the competition. Australia won all their matches in the group stage. Except for their win against England, when they recovered from 135 for 8 to reach the target of 205 runs, they won all their matches comfortably.

India had a shaky start to the tournament. In their opening match against the Netherlands, they were bowled out for 204 runs. Although they won the game by 68 runs, the team was criticised for failing to bat out their 50 overs. After they were dismissed for 125 runs against Australia and lost the match by nine wickets, angry fans in India burned effigies of the players; Mohammad Kaif's house and Rahul Dravid's car were vandalised. India won all the remaining games of the stage—against Zimbabwe, Pakistan, Namibia and England.

Australia, India and Zimbabwe finished the group as the top three teams and qualified for the Super Sixes from Pool A, while Pool B had Sri Lanka, Kenya and New Zealand progress for the next stage.

=== Super Sixes ===
In the first match of the Super Sixes against Sri Lanka, Australia made 319 runs for five wickets. The Australian captain Ricky Ponting and his deputy, Adam Gilchrist, scored 114 not out and 99 respectively. Sri Lanka in reply managed 223 runs in 47.4 overs. Aravinda de Silva top-scored with 92 while Brett Lee captured three wickets for Australia. In the next match against New Zealand, Shane Bond's six wickets for 23 runs reduced Australia to 84 runs for seven wickets in 27 overs before Michael Bevan and Andrew Bichel took the total to 208 runs. Lee's five wickets for 42 runs helped to bowl New Zealand out for 112 runs, their lowest total in World Cup. Australia won their final game by five wickets after bowling out Kenya for 174 runs.

After losing the toss against Kenya in their first match, India were set a target of 226 runs. Despite an initial collapse, their captain Sourav Ganguly (107 not out) and Yuvraj Singh (58 not out) ensured India's victory. In the next game against Sri Lanka, India made 292 runs; Tendulkar (97) and Sehwag (66) top-scored for the team. Srinath took four wickets as Sri Lanka were bowled out for 109, and India won the match by a margin of 183 runs. In their final match of the stage, India played New Zealand. Zaheer Khan returned career-best figures of four wickets for 42 runs, and New Zealand were dismissed for 146 runs. India lost three wickets for 21 runs, before Dravid, their vice-captain, and Kaif added 129 runs for the fourth wicket and ensured a seven-wicket win. The match marked the seventh consecutive victory for India in the tournament.

=== Semi-finals ===
The first semi-final was played between Australia and Sri Lanka on 18 March at St. George's Park, Port Elizabeth. Australia won the toss and opted to bat first. They managed 212 runs for the loss of 7 wickets at the end of 50 overs. Symonds top-scored for the team with 91 not out, while Chaminda Vaas picked up three wickets for Sri Lanka. With 213 runs needed for victory, Sri Lanka lost both the openers after which the play was interrupted by rain. The target was revised to 172 runs from 38.1 overs using the Duckworth–Lewis method, a mathematical formulation used to calculate revised targets for teams batting second in case of matches being interrupted by bad weather or rain. Kumar Sangakkara and Vaas made 47 runs together for the eighth wicket, the highest partnership of the innings, but the team managed to score only 123 runs in the allotted overs. Australia progressed into the final as Sri Lanka fell 48 runs short of the target.

The second semi-final was played between India and Kenya on 20 March 2003 at Kingsmead, Durban. Kenya became the first non-Test team to play a World Cup semi-final. India won the toss and made 270 runs for four wickets. Ganguly and Tendulkar made 111 not out and 83 respectively. In reply, Kenya were bowled out for 179 in 46.2 overs. Their captain Steve Tikolo top-scored with 56 runs, while Zaheer Khan took three wickets for 14 runs. Ganguly was adjudged the Man of the match.

== Build up ==
Many journalists considered Australia, undefeated throughout the tournament, to be favourites in the final. The Indian industrialist Vijay Mallya organised special flights, including a few chartered ones, to transport film actors, politicians and businessmen to Johannesburg; most of these people supported India. Some South African airlines also extended their support to India. The air tickets from Mumbai to Johannesburg were completely sold out immediately after India entered the Super Sixes stage. Although most journalists and analysts favoured Australia, former Pakistan captain Imran Khan believed India were favourites. Former Australia cricketer Greg Chappell complimented Brett Lee: he said, except for Lee, no Australian bowler was a serious threat to the Indian batsmen, and also remarked that the "duel" between Lee and Tendulkar would be crucial.

On the eve of the match, which would be his 100th ODI as India's captain, Ganguly issued a statement saying his team were honoured to play the World Cup final. He cited India's victories at the 1983 World Cup and the 1985 World Championship of Cricket as his inspirations. Although acknowledging Australia as the best side in the world, he said they were not "unbeatable". Australia's main concern was Tendulkar, the tournament's top-scorer, of whom the Indian fans had high expectations. Ponting hinted about the possibility that his bowlers, Lee and Glenn McGrath, had "special" plans to restrict him. He also said that in crucial matches his team "tries to reach another level".

Australia were making their 5th appearance in a World Cup final. Previously, they won finals in 1987 and 1999, and lost in 1975 and 1996. India was appearing in their second World Cup final. They were successful in their only previous final appearance, in 1983, against the West Indies. Before the match, the two teams had faced each other eight times in World Cups; Australia had won six of them. In the 2003 tournament, Australia won all their matches to that point; India's only defeat came in the group stage against Australia. (Note: India's winning streak included eight consecutive victories.) For all the Indian players it was their first World Cup final, whereas six of the Australians had appeared in at least one previous final.

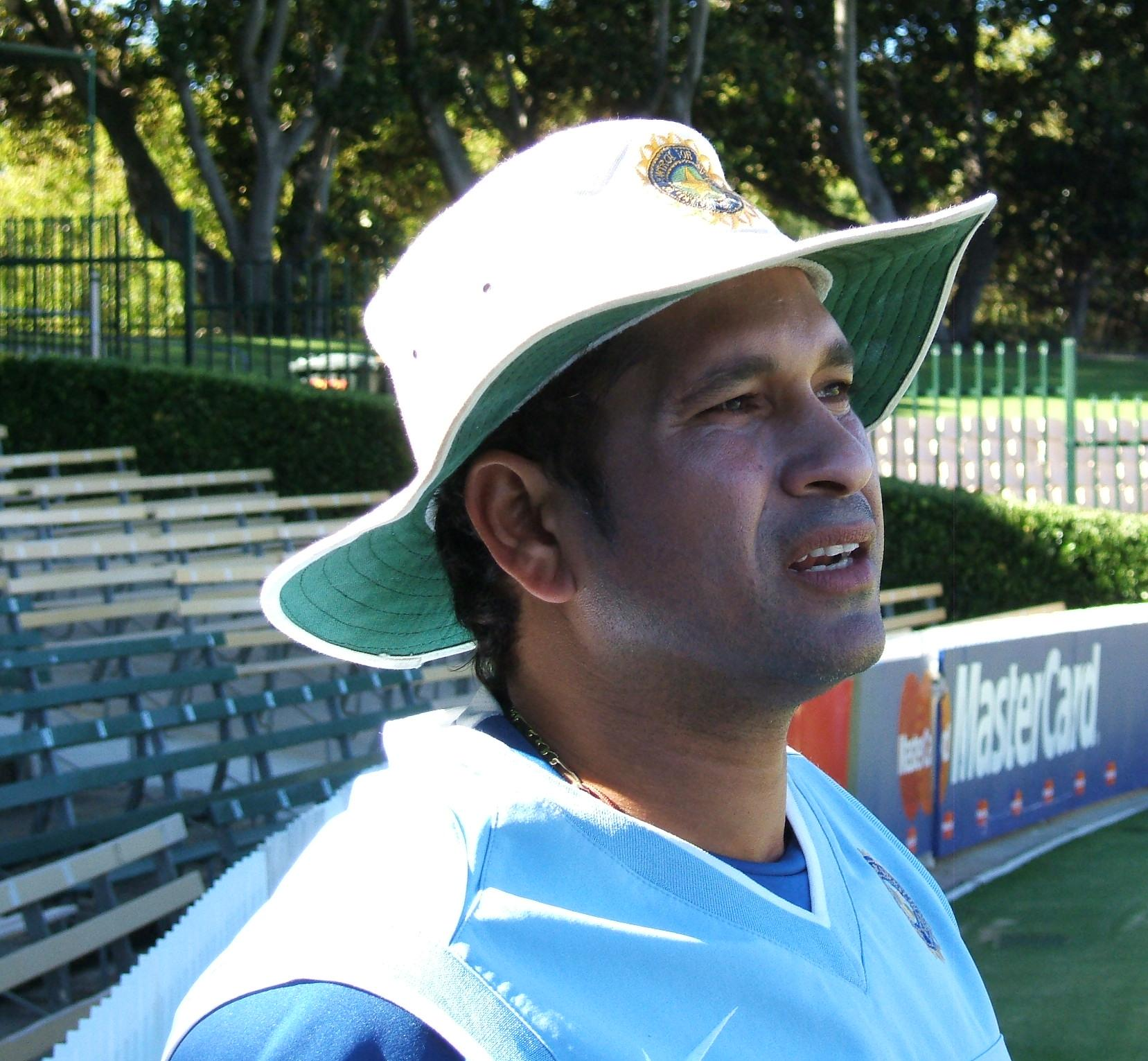
India's Sachin Tendulkar was the tournament's top-scorer with 673 runs.

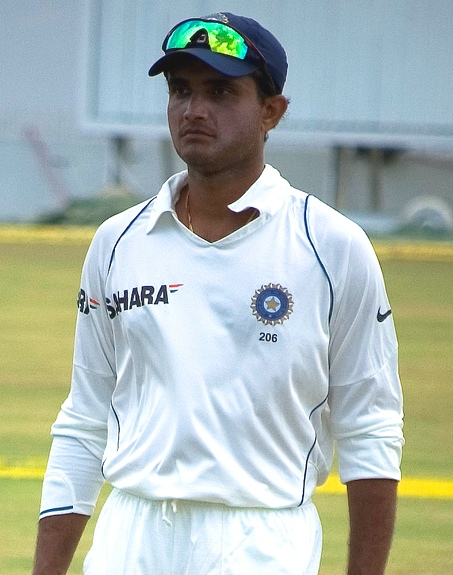
India captain Sourav Ganguly was the second-highest run scorer in the tournament.

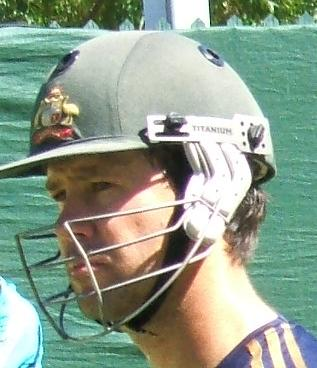
Australia captain Ricky Ponting scored 415 runs in the tournament.

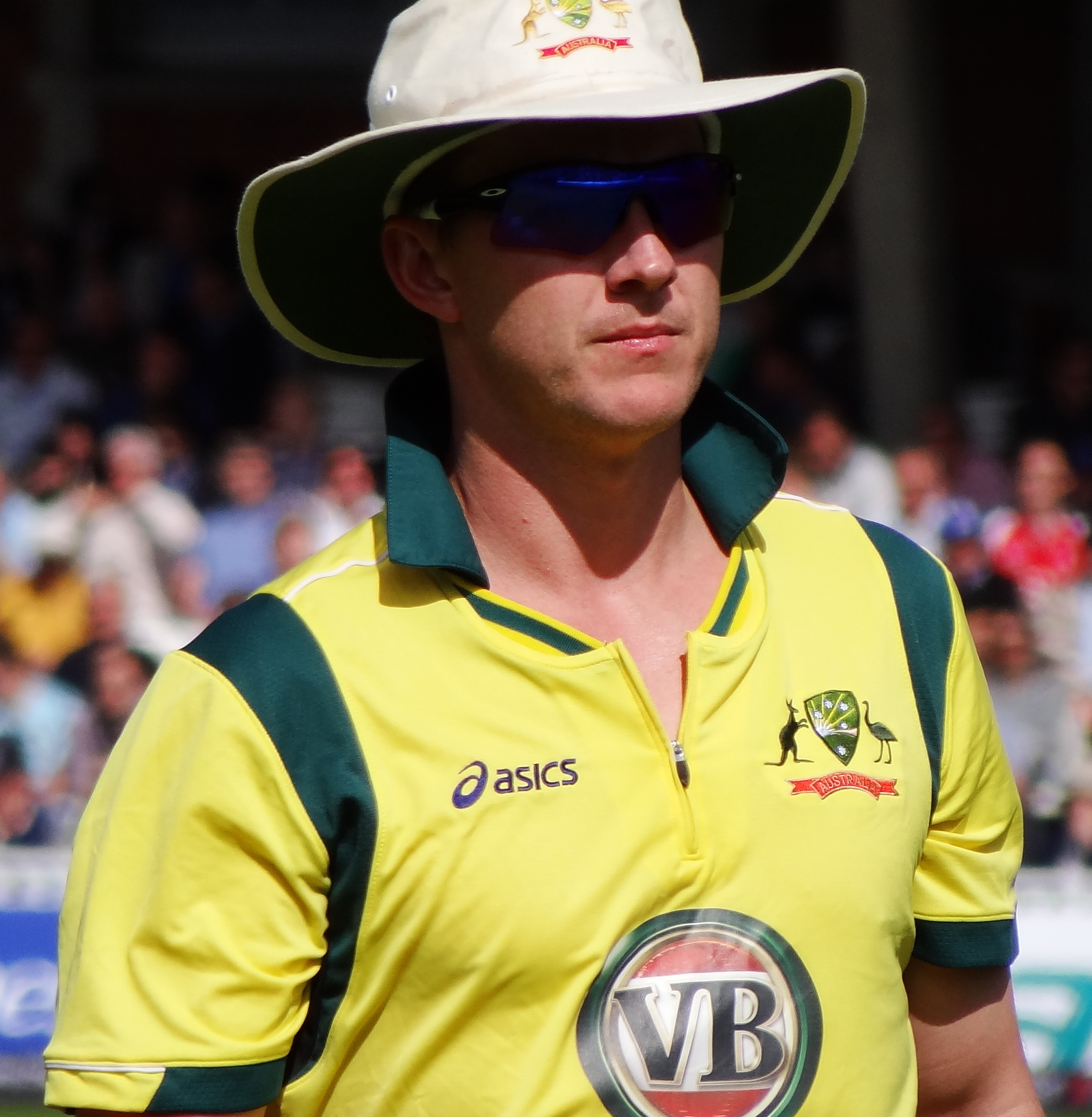
Australia's Brett Lee was the tournament's second-highest wicket taker.

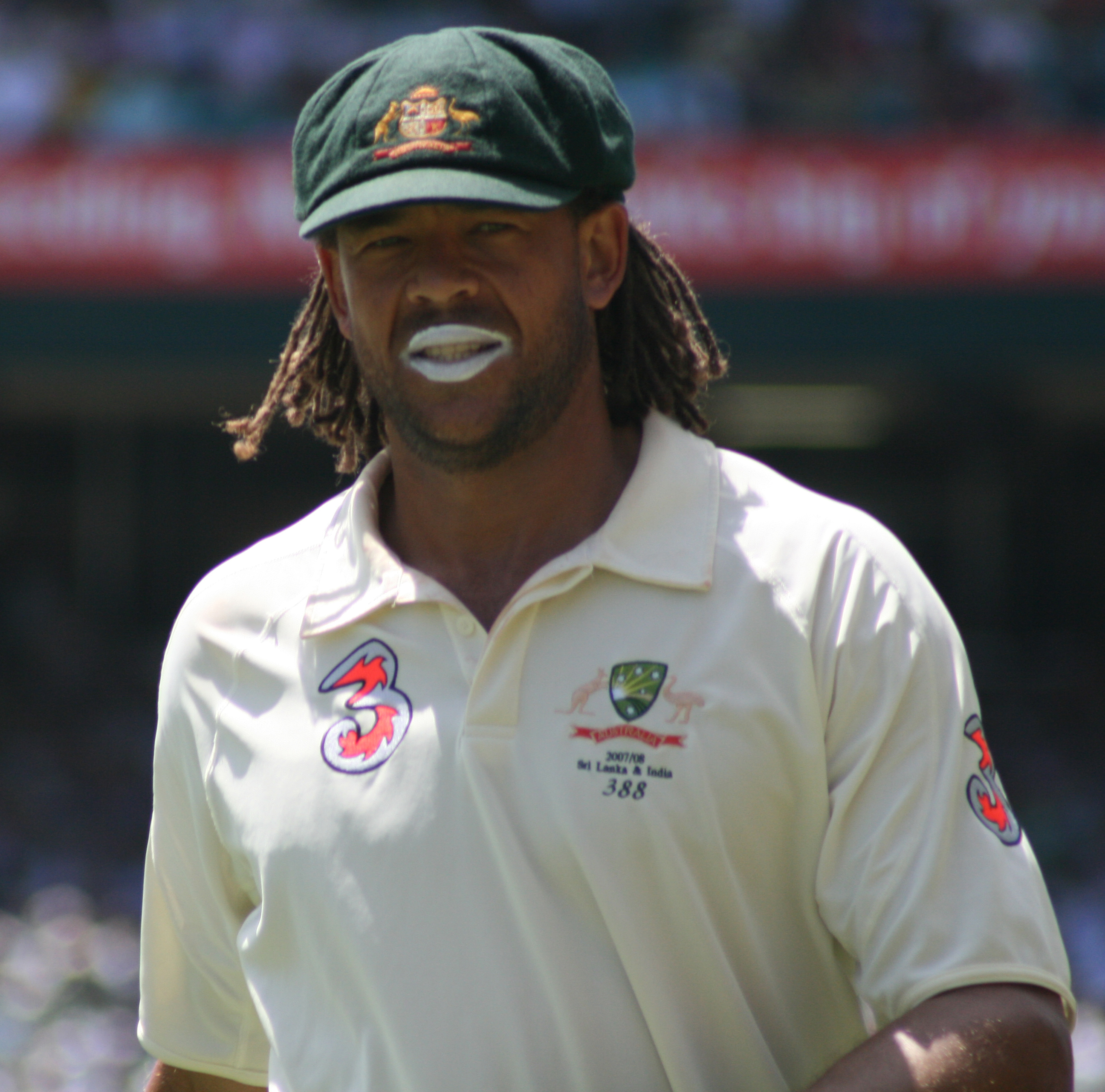
Andrew Symonds played two important innings, each against Pakistan and Sri Lanka, to lead Australia to victory.

== Match details ==
=== Match officials ===
- On-field umpires: Steve Bucknor (WI) and David Shepherd (Eng)
- Third umpire: Rudi Koertzen (SA)
- Reserve umpire: Billy Bowden (NZ)
- Match referee: Ranjan Madugalle (SL)

=== Summary ===
The final was played on 23 March 2003 at the Wanderers Stadium, Johannesburg. This was the fifth match to be played at the ground in the tournament. The match, watched by a crowd of 31,779, began at 10:00 SAST. Simon Wilde, writing for the Wisden Cricketers' Almanack, said the venue was one of the "most bountiful" grounds for batsmen. However, on that day the pitch was moist and the outfield was damp as a result of the thunderstorms the previous evening. A short shower that morning forced the ground staff to blow dry air over the pitch. The sky was overcast with a chance of further rainfall. For the umpires—David Shepherd and Steve Bucknor—it was their third World Cup Final. Rudi Koertzen and Billy Bowden were appointed as the third and fourth umpires, respectively. Former Sri Lankan cricketer Ranjan Madugalle served as the match referee.

India remained unchanged from the side that played the semi-final, while Australia excluded Ian Harvey and brought back Damien Martyn into the side. Ganguly won the toss and elected to field first. Zaheer Khan opened the bowling for India along with Javagal Srinath. The Australian openers scored aggressively from the beginning of the innings as Khan conceded 15 runs in the first over. Gilchrist in particular hit both Khan and Srinath for many runs and reached his 50 from 40 balls. When Ganguly turned to his spin bowlers as early as the tenth over, Gilchrist slowed his scoring rate. In the fourteenth over, when Harbhajan Singh was brought back to bowl, Gilchrist (57 off 48 balls) tried to hit him over the mid-wicket, but was beaten by the ball's extra bounce and caught in the deep by Virender Sehwag. The pair had added 105 runs for the first wicket. Harbhajan struck again in the twentieth over when he dismissed Hayden (37 runs off 54 balls), leaving the score at 125 runs.

After Hayden's departure, Ponting was joined by Martyn, who completed his half-century in 46 balls. Ponting scored at a slower rate, reaching his 50 off 74 balls with one four. After completing his half century, he accelerated; he hit two sixes off Harbhajan and one off Ashish Nehra. The pair added 100 runs off 109 balls for the third wicket. Ponting reached his century quickly—his second fifty came off 29 balls. At the end of the innings, Australia had scored 359 runs for two wickets; (Note: This was Australia's highest total in ODIs at the time.) Ponting had scored 140 not out (off 121 balls; four fours and eight sixes) (Note: Ponting's eight sixes in the innings were the most at the time by a batsman in a World Cup match.) and Martyn hit 88 not out (off 84 balls; seven fours and one six) respectively. As of the 2019 competition, Ponting's innings remains the highest individual score by a captain in a World Cup final, and Australia's total remains the highest by a team in a World Cup final. The 234-run stand between Ponting and Marytn was a record partnership for Australia in ODIs at that point in time. (Note: As of January 2017, this is the sixth-highest partnership for any wicket for Australia in ODIs.) The Indian bowlers conceded 37 extras. Srinath conceded 87 runs without taking a wicket—the most expensive figures in his career—in what was his last international game.

India came out to bat with Tendulkar and Sehwag. McGrath opened the bowling for Australia. Tendulkar hit a boundary off the fourth ball of the over but was dismissed off the next delivery. Ganguly joined Sehwag and the pair scored at a run-a-ball before the former was dismissed by Lee in the tenth over. Kaif, the next man, was dismissed in the next over with the score 59 runs for 3 wickets. Dravid and Sehwag scored steadily from then on until the seventeenth over, when rain interrupted play with the score at 103 runs. Just before the interruption, Ponting brought in Australia's spinners, Brad Hogg and Darren Lehmann to speed up the over rate. Sehwag was more aggressive against both, hitting Lehmann for three consecutive fours and Hogg for a four and six; Dravid played a secondary role to Sehwag, pushing often for singles. They were dismissed in 24th and 32nd over after scoring 82 (off 81 balls) and 47 (off 57 balls) respectively. Following that, India began to lose wickets at regular intervals. Except for Yuvraj Singh (24) and Dinesh Mongia (12), the rest of the players were out for single-digit scores. India were bowled out for 234 after 39.2 overs. Australia won the match by 125 runs. It was their second successive World Cup trophy and their third overall. Ponting was declared the Man of the match for his 140 not out.

23 March
Scorecard

| Australia; 359/2 (50 overs) | v | India; 234 (39.2 overs) |
| Ricky Ponting 140* (121); Harbhajan Singh 2/49 (8 overs) | | Virender Sehwag 82 (81); Glenn McGrath 3/52 (8.2 overs) |

Australia won by 125 runs
Wanderers Stadium, Johannesburg
Umpires: Steve Bucknor (WI) and David Shepherd (Eng)
Player of the match: Ricky Ponting (Aus)

- India won the toss and elected to field.

== Scorecard ==
1st innings

Australia batting
| Player | Status | Runs | Balls | 4s | 6s | Strike rate |
|---|---|---|---|---|---|---|
| Adam Gilchrist † | c Sehwag b Harbhajan | 57 | 48 | 8 | 1 | 118.75 |
| Matthew Hayden | c Dravid b Harbhajan | 37 | 54 | 5 | 0 | 68.51 |
| Ricky Ponting * | not out | 140 | 121 | 4 | 8 | 115.70 |
| Damien Martyn | not out | 88 | 84 | 7 | 1 | 104.76 |
| Darren Lehmann | | | | | | |
| Michael Bevan | | | | | | |
| Andrew Symonds | | | | | | |
| Brad Hogg | | | | | | |
| Andy Bichel | | | | | | |
| Brett Lee | | | | | | |
| Glenn McGrath | | | | | | |
| Extras | (b 2, lb 12, w 16, nb 7) | 37 | | | | |
| Total | (2 wickets; 50 overs) | 359 | | | | |

Fall of wickets: 1/105 (Gilchrist, 13.6 ov), 2/125 (Hayden, 19.5 ov)

India bowling
| Bowler | Overs | Maidens | Runs | Wickets | Econ | Wides | NBs |
|---|---|---|---|---|---|---|---|
| Zaheer Khan | 7 | 0 | 67 | 0 | 9.57 | 6 | 2 |
| Javagal Srinath | 10 | 0 | 87 | 0 | 8.70 | 2 | 1 |
| Ashish Nehra | 10 | 0 | 57 | 0 | 5.70 | 3 | 0 |
| Harbhajan Singh | 8 | 0 | 49 | 2 | 6.12 | 0 | 0 |
| Virender Sehwag | 3 | 0 | 14 | 0 | 4.66 | 0 | 0 |
| Sachin Tendulkar | 3 | 0 | 20 | 0 | 6.66 | 1 | 0 |
| Dinesh Mongia | 7 | 0 | 39 | 0 | 5.57 | 0 | 2 |
| Yuvraj Singh | 2 | 0 | 12 | 0 | 6.00 | 0 | 0 |

2nd innings

India batting
| Player | Status | Runs | Balls | 4s | 6s | Strike rate |
|---|---|---|---|---|---|---|
| Sachin Tendulkar | c & b McGrath | 4 | 5 | 1 | 0 | 80.00 |
| Virender Sehwag | run out (Lehmann) | 82 | 81 | 10 | 3 | 101.23 |
| Sourav Ganguly * | c Lehmann b Lee | 24 | 25 | 3 | 1 | 96.00 |
| Mohammad Kaif | c Gilchrist b McGrath | 0 | 3 | 0 | 0 | 0.00 |
| Rahul Dravid † | b Bichel | 47 | 57 | 2 | 0 | 82.45 |
| Yuvraj Singh | c Lee b Hogg | 24 | 34 | 1 | 0 | 70.58 |
| Dinesh Mongia | c Martyn b Symonds | 12 | 11 | 2 | 0 | 109.09 |
| Harbhajan Singh | c McGrath b Symonds | 7 | 8 | 0 | 0 | 87.50 |
| Zaheer Khan | c Lehmann b McGrath | 4 | 8 | 0 | 0 | 50.00 |
| Javagal Srinath | b Lee | 1 | 4 | 0 | 0 | 0.00 |
| Ashish Nehra | not out | 8 | 4 | 2 | 0 | 200.00 |
| Extras | (lb 1, w 3, nb 1) | 5 | | | | |
| Total | (All Out; 39.2 overs) | 234 | | | | |

Fall of wickets: 4/1 (Tendulkar, 0.5), 58/2 (Ganguly, 9.5), 59/3 (Kaif, 10.3), 147/4 (Sehwag, 23.5), 187/5 (Dravid, 31.5), 208/6 (Yuvraj, 34.5), 209/7 (Mongia, 35.2), 223/8 (Harbhajan, 37.1), 226/9 (Srinath, 38.2), 234/10 (Zaheer, 39.2)

Australia bowling
| Bowler | Overs | Maidens | Runs | Wickets | Econ | Wides | NBs |
|---|---|---|---|---|---|---|---|
| Glenn McGrath | 8.2 | 0 | 52 | 3 | 6.24 | 0 | 0 |
| Brett Lee | 7 | 1 | 31 | 2 | 4.42 | 2 | 4 |
| Brad Hogg | 10 | 0 | 61 | 1 | 6.10 | 2 | 0 |
| Darren Lehmann | 2 | 0 | 18 | 0 | 9.00 | 0 | 0 |
| Andy Bichel | 10 | 0 | 57 | 1 | 5.70 | 4 | 0 |
| Andrew Symonds | 2 | 0 | 7 | 2 | 3.50 | 1 | 0 |

Key

- * – Captain
- † – Wicket-keeper
- c Fielder – Indicates that the batsman was dismissed by a catch by the named fielder
- b Bowler – Indicates which bowler gains credit for the dismissal

== Aftermath ==
Australia became the first team to win three World Cups, and registered a record 17 consecutive ODI wins. They also became the third team to win all the matches in a World Cup tournament. Writing for the Wisden Cricketers' Almanack, Simon Wilde remarked that Australia would have beaten a Rest of the World XI had they been asked.

At the post-match press conference, Ponting said the Indian players showed no signs of winning the match at any point in time. On Australia's win he said, "It's not that we think we are ahead of the others. It's just the way we play." Nevertheless, he complimented both teams by saying India and Australia were the two best teams in the tournament, and that the Indian players deserved to be in the final. Ganguly praised the Australian batsmen and said they played like "real champions".

Ganguly's decision to bowl first was criticised by the media: The New York Times, for instance, said it "backfired horribly". Former Pakistan captain Imran Khan, while denouncing Ganguly's decision, also criticised his idea of going into the match with an unchanged side. He said India should have played their leg spinner Anil Kumble as the ball was "gripping [in] the surface". The journalist and former England cricketer Mike Selvey believed Ganguly may have been influenced by the possibility of the Duckworth–Lewis method affecting the result. Indian journalist Boria Majumdar in his book, Cricketing Cultures in Conflict (2004), remarked about the possibility of Australia losing the rain-interrupted final, if the result were to be decided by this method. Ganguly defended his decision, saying the overcast conditions and moisture in the pitch meant it was favourable to the bowlers, but they failed to use it properly. Ponting said he would have opted to bat first had they won the toss. His teammate Symonds, in an interview later, recalled that India's decision to bowl first gave them an impression that they were not "confident enough to take the fight".

Australia were rewarded with prize money totaling US$2,000,000, while India received $800,000. Tendulkar's aggregate of 673 runs in the tournament fetched him the Man of the series accolade. (Note: Tendulkar's aggregate is a record for any player in a single World Cup as of the 2015 tournament.) Ponting's innings of 140 not out was placed among the best innings of the tournament by Rediff, and among the top 10 performances in a World Cup final by the ICC. Tendulkar and Hayden were included among the "Highest impact World XI", a World Cup team released by the Wisden India owned website Impact Index, in February 2015. Srinath, who was then India's leading wicket-taker in ODIs, retired a few months after the competition. The match also marked the end of India coach John Wright's contract. On his request the Board of Control for Cricket in India retained his position in which he continued to serve until 2005.

== See also ==
- India at the Cricket World Cup
- List of Cricket World Cup finals

== Sources ==
- Hadlee, Richard (2004). Cricket: The Essentials of the Game. India Research Press. ISBN 978-81-87943-45-7.
- Majumdar, Boria (2004). Cricketing Cultures in Conflict: World Cup 2003. Psychology Press. ISBN 978-0-7146-8407-9.
- Pal, Suvam (2015). The HarperCollins Book of World Cup Trivia. HarperCollins Publishers India. ISBN 978-93-5177-164-7.
- Tendulkar, Sachin; Majumdar, Boria (2014). Playing It My Way: My Autobiography. Hodder & Stoughton. ISBN 978-1-4736-0519-0.
- Wadhwaney, K. R. (2003). Scandals, Controversies & World Cup – 2003. Diamond Pocket Books (P) Ltd. ISBN 978-81-288-0366-6.
