= Fourth umpire =

Cricket umpire

The fourth umpire (sometimes referred to as the reserve umpire), is a cricket umpire. For all international matches a fourth umpire is required to perform duties like bringing on the new ball, carrying drinks on to the field for the umpires, checking the batteries in the light meter, observing the pitch during the lunch and tea intervals to make sure there is no interference, or bringing on new bails. The fourth umpire will take over the third umpire duties if something happens to one of the on-field umpires, as the rules state the third umpire will take over on-field duties.

For Test matches, the fourth umpire is appointed by the home side's Governing body from their nominees to the International Panel of ICC Umpires, so has the same nationality as the home side.

In January 2021, in the third Test match between Australia and India, Australia's Claire Polosak became the first female to officiate in a men's Test match as fourth umpire.
