= 1987 Cricket World Cup final =

1987 ICC Cricket World Cup Final
- Event: 1987 ICC Cricket World Cup
Australia	England
(Australia)	(England)
253/5	246/8
50 overs	50 overs
- Australia won by 7 runs
- Date: 8 November 1987
- Venue: Eden Gardens, Calcutta
- Player of the match: David Boon (Aus)
- Umpires: Ram Gupta (Ind) and Mahboob Shah (Pak)
- Attendance: 70,000 – 90,000

The 1987 Cricket World Cup Final (known as the Reliance Cricket World Cup Final for sponsorship reasons) was a One Day International (ODI) cricket match played at Eden Gardens in Calcutta on 8 November 1987 to determine the winner of the 1987 Cricket World Cup. It was contested by Australia and England, both of whom had yet to win the trophy. The 1987 World Cup was the first World Cup to be hosted outside of England; it was also the first World Cup to feature a 50-over per side match format and the first time the final had been hosted at a venue other than Lord's. It was estimated that between 70,000 and 90,000 spectators attended the match.

== Background ==
Australia went into the 1987 World Cup having lost a home Ashes series and their five previous ODI matches leading up to the tournament. Steve Waugh, who was competing in his first World Cup and would become one of the players of the tournament, said that Australia were considered, both at home and abroad, to be "rank outsiders". Under coach Bob Simpson, the Australians undertook extra fielding sessions upon arriving in India, and an alcohol ban between games was also imposed. While these somewhat revolutionary measures were ridiculed by other teams, Simpson's approach would pay off as Australia progressed through the tournament.
Placed in Group A along with India, New Zealand and Zimbabwe, the Australians finished second in the group behind India on run rate, which meant they would face Pakistan, who topped Group B, in the semi-final. Australia's success had been built on various factors: the opening pair of David Boon and Geoff Marsh (who ended the tournament as the second- and third-highest individual run-scorers respectively) consistently gave the Australian innings a firm foundation on which to build substantial scores; opening bowler Craig McDermott (who ended the tournament as the leading wicket-taker with 18) excelled in conditions traditionally unfavourable to pace bowlers; and all-rounders Simon O'Donnell and Steve Waugh chipped in at critical moments with bat and ball.
All these factors came to the fore when Australia upset the Pakistanis at the Gaddafi Stadium in Lahore; Batting first, Marsh and Boon put on 73 for the first wicket as the Australians finished with 267 for eight off their 50 overs, with Waugh scoring 18 runs off the final over. In reply, Pakistan fell to 38 for three before Imran Khan and Javed Miandad set about resurrecting the innings. But after they were removed, McDermott proceeded to clean up the tail and send Australia into its first World Cup final since 1975.

In Group B along with Pakistan, Sri Lanka and West Indies, England finished second behind Pakistan with wins over West Indies (considered the best cricket team in the world at the time) and Sri Lanka, and would face India in semi-final at the Wankhede Stadium in Bombay. After being sent in by the home team, England posted 254 for six from its 50 overs, led by 115 from Graham Gooch (who ended the tournament as the leading run-scorer) and 56 from captain Mike Gatting. India's innings started badly when home-town hero Sunil Gavaskar was bowled by Philip DeFreitas for 4. The middle order, led by Mohammad Azharuddin, revived the home crowd's hopes, but after off-spinner Eddie Hemmings struck with four wickets, the chase collapsed, with the last five wickets falling for only 15 runs. Like Australia, England had qualified for its second shot at glory, having previously lost to West Indies in 1979.

== Details ==
8 November in Calcutta was a fine and hot day, but with less humidity than Bombay, where the England–India semi-final had been staged. Preparation of the Eden Gardens wicket had been overseen by the renowned Adelaide Oval curator Les Burdett, who had been invited by the Bengal Cricket Association.

Allan Border won the toss and chose to bat. As they had done for much of the tournament, openers Geoff Marsh and David Boon gave Australia a fantastic start, benefiting from the unusually wayward and undisciplined bowling of Philip DeFreitas and Gladstone Small (who conceded six no-balls) to post 52 off the first ten overs. Waugh joined Veletta for the final over of the innings, to be bowled by DeFreitas. The pair combined to score 11 runs off it to push Australia's score to 253, becoming the first team all tournament to score more than 250 against England.

The Australians took to the field with some confidence that their total was defendable; no team batting second at this World Cup had successfully chased 254. England's innings started badly when McDermott trapped Tim Robinson in front for a golden duck midway through the first over. Bill Athey (58 from 103 balls, 2 fours) top-scored, and England were almost on target, when captain Mike Gatting (41 from 45 balls, 3 fours, 1 six) handed back the initiative with the loss of his wicket to an attempted reverse sweep off the occasional off-spin bowling of Allan Border, which ended a growing partnership of 69 runs in 13 overs between him and Athey. Allan Lamb (45 from 55 balls, 4 fours) also posted a great innings, but it was in vain as the required run-rate for England began to rise. When England failed to score the last 17 runs from the final over, the cup went to Australia.

8 November 1987
Scorecard

Australia; 253/5 (50 overs)	v	England; 246/8 (50 overs)
David Boon 75 (125); Eddie Hemmings 2/48 (10 overs)		Bill Athey 58 (103); Steve Waugh 2/37 (9 overs)

Australia won by 7 runs
Eden Gardens, Calcutta
Attendance: 95,343
Umpires: Ram Gupta (Ind) and Mahboob Shah (Pak)
Player of the match: David Boon (Aus)

- Australia won the toss and elected to bat.

== Scorecard ==
1st innings

Australia batting
Player	Status	Runs	Balls	4s	6s	Strike rate
David Boon	c Downton b Hemmings	75	125	7	0	60.00
Geoff Marsh	b Foster	24	49	3	0	48.97
Dean Jones	c Athey b Hemmings	33	57	1	1	57.89
Craig McDermott	b Gooch	14	8	2	0	175.00
Allan Border	run out (Robinson/Downton)	31	31	3	0	100.00
Mike Veletta	not out	45	31	6	0	145.16
Steve Waugh	not out	5	4	0	0	125.00
Simon O'Donnell	did not bat					
Greg Dyer	did not bat					
Tim May	did not bat					
Bruce Reid	did not bat					
Extras	(b 1, lb 13, w 7, nb 5)	26				
Total	(5 wickets; 50 overs)	253		22	1	

Fall of wickets: 1/75 (Marsh), 2/151 (Jones), 3/166 (McDermott), 4/168 (Boon), 5/241 (Border)

England bowling
Bowler	Overs	Maidens	Runs	Wickets	Econ	Wides	NBs
Philip DeFreitas	6	1	34	0	5.66	1	1
Gladstone Small	6	0	33	0	5.50	0	6
Neil Foster	10	0	38	1	3.80	1	0
Eddie Hemmings	10	1	48	2	4.80	0	0
John Emburey	10	0	44	0	4.40	0	0
Graham Gooch	8	1	42	1	5.25	1	0

2nd innings

England batting
Player	Status	Runs	Balls	4s	6s	Strike rate
Graham Gooch	lbw b O'Donnell	35	57	4	0	61.40
Tim Robinson	lbw b McDermott	0	1	0	0	0.00
Bill Athey	run out (Waugh/Reid)	58	103	2	0	56.31
Mike Gatting	c Dyer b Border	41	45	3	1	91.11
Allan Lamb	b Waugh	45	55	4	0	81.81
Paul Downton	c O'Donnell b Border	9	8	1	0	112.50
John Emburey	run out (Boon/McDermott)	10	16	0	0	62.50
Philip DeFreitas	c Reid b Waugh	17	10	2	1	170.00
Neil Foster	not out	7	6	0	0	116.66
Gladstone Small	not out	3	3	0	0	100.00
Eddie Hemmings	did not bat					
Extras	(b 1, lb 14, nb 4, w 2)	21				
Total	(8 wickets; 50 overs)	246		16	2	

Fall of wickets: 1/1 (Robinson), 2/66 (Gooch), 3/135 (Gatting), 4/170 (Athey), 5/188 (Downton), 6/218 (Emburey), 7/220 (Lamb), 8/235 (DeFreitas)

Australia bowling
Bowler	Overs	Maidens	Runs	Wickets	Econ	Wides	NBs
Craig McDermott	10	1	51	1	5.10	0	0
Bruce Reid	10	0	43	0	4.30	1	2
Steve Waugh	9	0	37	2	4.11	1	1
Simon O'Donnell	10	1	35	1	3.50	0	1
Tim May	4	0	27	0	6.75	0	0
Allan Border	7	0	38	2	5.42	0	0

== See also ==
- 1987 Cricket World Cup squads
