= 2007 Cricket World Cup =

9th Cricket World Cup

- Dates: 13 March – 28 April 2007
- Administrator: International Cricket Council
- Cricket format: One Day International
- Tournament format(s): Round-robin and Knockout
- Host: West Indies
- Champions: Australia (4th title)
- Runners-up: Sri Lanka
- Participants: 16 (from 97 entrants)
- Matches: 51
- Attendance: 672,000 (13,176 per match)
- Player of the series: (Australia) Glenn McGrath
- Most runs: (Australia) Matthew Hayden (659)
- Most wickets: (Australia) Glenn McGrath (26)

The 2007 ICC Cricket World Cup was the ninth Cricket World Cup, a One Day International (ODI) cricket tournament that took place in the West Indies from 13 March to 28 April 2007. There were a total of 51 matches played, three fewer than at the 2003 World Cup (despite a field larger by two teams).

The 16 competing teams were initially divided into four groups, with the two best-performing teams from each group moving on to a Super 8 format. Every team played a total of 6 matches in the Super 8 round; they didn't play with teams of their own group. They played a total of 6 teams from another three groups (the top 2 teams of all three groups). From this, Australia, New Zealand, Sri Lanka, and South Africa won through to the semi-finals, with Australia defeating Sri Lanka in the final to win their third consecutive World Cup and their fourth overall. Australia's unbeaten record in the tournament increased their total to 29 consecutive World Cup matches without a loss, a streak dating back to 23 May 1999, during the group stage of the 1999 World Cup. The tournament also saw upsets and surprise results, with pre-tournament favourites India and Pakistan failing to make it past the group stage, while Bangladesh, the second-lowest ranked ICC Full Member at the time, and World Cup debutant Ireland, which was an ICC Associate Member at the time, made it to the "Super 8", beating India and Pakistan respectively en route. Ireland became only the second associate nation to make it past the first round of a Cricket World Cup, the first being Kenya in 2003.

Pakistan coach Bob Woolmer died the day after Pakistan was knocked out. The following day, police initially announced that the death was suspicious and ordered a full investigation. Eight months later, an open verdict was returned and the case closed.

Following the tournament, the ICC distributed surplus tournament revenues of US$239 million to its members.

== Host selection ==
The World Cup was awarded to the West Indies via the International Cricket Council's rotational policy. It is the first time the ICC Cricket World Cup has been held in the Caribbean despite the fact that the West Indies cricket team had been the second most successful team in past World Cups. (Note: In terms of number of wins, win percentage, and number of cups won. In fact, they were on top on all of these criteria from 1975 to 1987, and only in 2003 did Australia pass their number of cups won.)

The United States contingent lobbied strongly for matches to be staged at its newly built cricket ground in Lauderhill, Florida, but the ICC decided to award all matches to Caribbean nations. Bids from Bermuda, St. Vincent and the Grenadines, and a second bid by Jamaica were also rejected.

Eight venues across the West Indies were selected to host the World Cup tournament. All host countries hosted six matches with the exceptions of St. Lucia, Jamaica, and Barbados (which hosted the final), each of which hosted seven matches.

The Jamaican government spent US$81 million for "on-the-pitch" expenses. This included refurbishing Sabina Park and constructing the new multi-purpose facility in Trelawny through a loan from China. Another US$20 million was budgeted for 'off-the-pitch' expenses, putting the tally at more than US$100 million or JM$7 billion.

This put the reconstruction cost of Sabina Park at US$46 million whilst the Trelawny Stadium was estimated to cost US$35 million. The total amount of money spent on stadiums was at least US$301 million.

Brian Lara Stadium in Trinidad lost its status as a pre-tournament warm-up match venue on 21 September 2006.

== Venues ==
The following venues were announced for the tournament:

Antigua and Barbuda	Barbados	Grenada	Guyana
Sir Vivian Richards Stadium; Capacity: 20,000	Kensington Oval; Capacity: 27,000	Queen's Park; Capacity: 20,000	Providence Stadium; Capacity: 15,000
Jamaica	Saint Kitts and Nevis	Saint Lucia	Trinidad and Tobago
Sabina Park; Capacity: 16,000	Warner Park Stadium; Capacity: 10,000	Beausejour Cricket Ground; Capacity: 20,000	Queen's Park Oval; Capacity: 25,000

=== Warm-up venues ===
Venue	City	Country	Capacity	Matches
3Ws Oval	Bridgetown	Barbados	8,500	4
Greenfield Stadium	Falmouth, Jamaica	Jamaica	25,000	4
Arnos Vale Stadium	Kingstown	Saint Vincent and the Grenadines	18,000	4
Sir Frank Worrell Memorial Ground	St. Augustine	Trinidad and Tobago		4

== Qualification ==
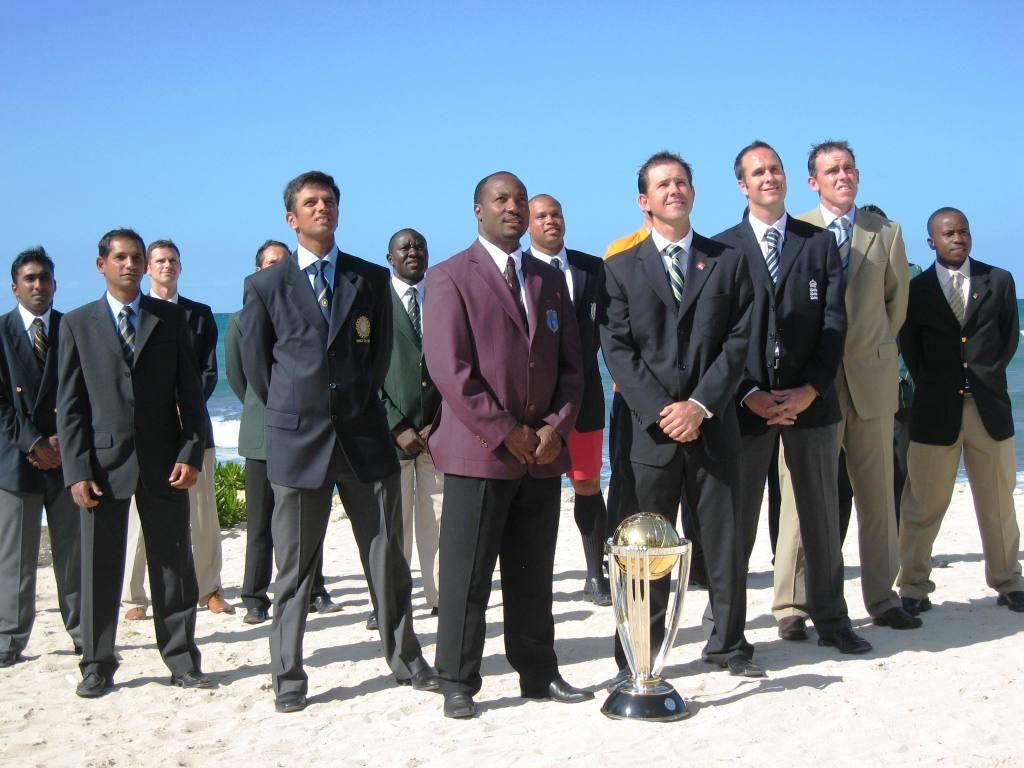
The captains of the 2007 Cricket World Cup

The field of 16 teams, the largest ever for the Cricket World Cup, consisted of all 16 teams which currently held ODI status. This included the ten full members of the ICC, all of which have Test and permanent ODI status. The other six (associate) ODI nations were Kenya (which had ODI status until 2009) and five additional teams (previously three) that qualified via the 2005 ICC Trophy (gaining ODI status until 2009 in the process). These nations included Scotland who won the ICC Trophy, Canada, the Netherlands, and – making their World Cup debuts – Ireland and Bermuda.

Full Members
Australia	Bangladesh
England	India
New Zealand	Pakistan
South Africa	Sri Lanka
West Indies	Zimbabwe
Associate Members
Bermuda	Canada
Kenya	Ireland
Netherlands	Scotland

== Squads ==
The 16 teams had to name their final squads by 13 February 2007. Changes were allowed after this deadline at the discretion of the ICC's Technical Committee in necessary cases, such as due to player injury.

== Leadup ==
All major Test-playing nations had schedules allowing them to play a large number of ODI matches against other major ODI teams just prior to the World Cup. Australia, New Zealand, and England took part in the Commonwealth Bank Series where England defeated Australia in the finals. Australia then went to New Zealand for the Chappell–Hadlee Trophy, losing 3–0. South Africa played five ODIs against India (South Africa won 4–0) and five against Pakistan (South Africa won 3–1), while India also played four ODIs against the West Indies (India won 3–1) and four ODIs against Sri Lanka (India won 2–1). Bangladesh played four ODIs against Zimbabwe (Bangladesh won 3–1) and won a tri-series against Canada and Bermuda. The associate ODI teams took part in the World Cricket League, which Kenya won, and were also involved in other series prior to the World Cup.

The rankings of the teams at the beginning of the Cricket World Cup were:

Ranking	Team	Points
1	South Africa	128
2	Australia	125
3	New Zealand	113
4	Pakistan	111
5	India	109
6	Sri Lanka	108
7	England	106
8	West Indies	101
9	Bangladesh	42
10	Zimbabwe	22
11	Kenya	0
12	Scotland	0% / 69%
13	Netherlands	0% / 50%
14	Ireland	0% / 44%
15	Canada	0% / 33%
16	Bermuda	0% / 28%

Note: Teams 12–16 did not have official ODI rankings leading up to the World Cup; they are ranked based on their win percentage against full members and then wins against associate members prior to the tournament.

=== Warm-up matches ===
Prior to the main tournament, all 16 nations played a series of warm-up matches to prepare, experiment with different tactics, and to help them get acclimated to conditions in the West Indies. The matches were played from Monday 5 March until Friday 9 March.

Australia, Bangladesh, India and Pakistan were the only teams to win both of their warm-up games, whilst Bermuda, Canada, the Netherlands and Scotland did not win either of their fixtures.

Matches

5 March 2007
(scorecard)

West Indies; 268/6 (50 overs)	v	Kenya; 247/7 (50 overs)
Marlon Samuels 100; Thomas Odoyo 2/26 (6 overs)		Collins Obuya 54*; Daren Powell 2/23 (6 overs)

West Indies won by 21 runs
Greenfield Stadium, Trelawny
Umpires: Billy Bowden (NZ) and Brian Jerling (SA)

5 March 2007
(scorecard)

England; 286/8 (50 overs)	v	Bermuda; 45 (22.2 overs)
Jamie Dalrymple 76; Delyone Borden 3/71 (10 overs)		David Hemp 11; Jon Lewis 3/7 (4 overs)

England won by 241 runs
Arnos Vale Stadium, Kingstown
Umpires: Tony Hill (NZ) and Rudi Koertzen (SA)

5 March 2007
(scorecard)

South Africa; 192 (50 overs)	v	Ireland; 157 (44.2 overs)
Andrew Hall 67*; Trent Johnston 4/40 (10 overs)		Andre Botha 40; Charl Langeveldt 4/31 (8.2 overs)

South Africa won by 35 runs
Sir Frank Worrell Memorial Ground, St. Augustine
Umpires: Aleem Dar (Pak) and Peter Parker (Aus)

5 March 2007
(scorecard)

Sri Lanka; 294/7 (50 overs)	v	Scotland; 135 (41.2 overs)
Kumar Sangakkara 81; John Blain 2/51 (9 overs)		Gavin Hamilton 25; Tillakaratne Dilshan 2/8 (4.2 overs)

Sri Lanka won by 159 runs
3Ws Oval, Bridgetown
Umpires: Ian Howell (SA) and Simon Taufel (Aus)

6 March 2007
(scorecard)

India; 300/9 (50 overs)	v	Netherlands; 118 (37.5 overs)
Rahul Dravid 74; Ryan ten Doeschate 5/57 (10 overs)		Bastiaan Zuiderent 32; Yuvraj Singh 4/12 (3.5 overs)

India won by 182 runs
Greenfield Stadium, Trelawny
Umpires: Steve Bucknor (WI) and Asoka de Silva (SL)

6 March 2007
(scorecard)

Australia; 290/7 (50 overs)	v	Zimbabwe; 184/7 (50 overs)
Michael Clarke 82; Sean Williams 2/48 (8 overs)		Sean Williams 44; Stuart Clark 2/33 (7 overs)

Australia won by 106 runs
Arnos Vale Stadium, Kingstown
Umpires: Asad Rauf (Pak) and Billy Doctrove (WI)

6 March 2007
(scorecard)

Pakistan; 273/8 (48 overs)	v	Canada; 196 (46.4 overs)
Mohammad Hafeez 61; Henry Osinde 2/48 (8 overs)		Qaiser Ali 37; Mohammad Hafeez 3/10 (3.4 overs)

Pakistan won by 77 runs (DL)
Sir Frank Worrell Memorial Ground, St. Augustine
Umpires: Ian Gould (Eng) and Daryl Harper (Aus)

- Match shortened due to technical issues; Duckworth-Lewis revised target to win: 274 runs in 48 overs for Canada.

6 March 2007
(scorecard)

New Zealand; 226 (47.2 overs)	v	Bangladesh; 230/8 (49 overs)
Jacob Oram 88; Abdur Razzak 4/26 (10 overs)		Tamim Iqbal 46; Daniel Vettori 3/38 (10 overs)

Bangladesh won by 2 wickets
3Ws Oval, Bridgetown
Umpires: Mark Benson (Eng) and Steve Davis (Aus)

8 March 2007
(scorecard)

Kenya; 274/8 (50 overs)	v	Netherlands; 265/9 (50 overs)
Thomas Odoyo 73; Daan van Bunge 3/41 (10 overs)		Darron Reekers 75; Steve Tikolo 5/48 (10 overs)

Kenya won by 9 runs
Greenfield Stadium, Trelawny
Umpires: Steve Bucknor (WI) and Billy Bowden (NZ)

8 March 2007
(scorecard)

Bermuda; 136 (50 overs)	v	Zimbabwe; 137/4 (29 overs)
Janeiro Tucker 56; Anthony Ireland 3/22 (8 overs)		Sean Williams 72*; Dwayne Leverock 2/54 (10 overs)

Zimbabwe won by 6 wickets
Arnos Vale Stadium, Kingstown
Umpires: Asad Rauf (Pak) and Rudi Koertzen (SA)

8 March 2007
(scorecard)

Canada; 115 (32.5 overs)	v	Ireland; 116/3 (26.5 overs)
Geoff Barnett 27; Dave Langford-Smith 4/41 (10 overs)		Jeremy Bray 41*; Abdool Samad 1/11 (3 overs)

Ireland won by 7 wickets
Sir Frank Worrell Memorial Ground, St. Augustine
Umpires: Aleem Dar (Pak) and Daryl Harper (Aus)

8 March 2007
(scorecard)

Scotland; 152/9 (50 overs)	v	Bangladesh; 153/3 (34.1 overs)
Navdeep Poonia 32; Abdur Razzak 4/41 (10 overs)		Habibul Bashar 57*; Paul Hoffmann 1/19 (6 overs)

Bangladesh won by 7 wickets
3Ws Oval, Bridgetown
Umpires: Mark Benson (Eng) and Simon Taufel (Aus)

9 March 2007
(scorecard)

England; 197 (48.3 overs)	v	Australia; 200/5 (40.5 overs)
Michael Vaughan 62; Shaun Tait 4/33 (8.3 overs)		Adam Gilchrist 72; Monty Panesar 1/16 (6 overs)

Australia won by 5 wickets
Arnos Vale Stadium, Kingstown
Umpires: Tony Hill (NZ) and Norman Malcolm (WI)

9 March 2007
(scorecard)

South Africa; 199 (48.3 overs)	v	Pakistan; 200/3 (44.3 overs)
Loots Bosman 53; Mohammad Sami 2/13 (5 overs)		Younis Khan 79; André Nel 1/21 (7 overs)

Pakistan won by 7 wickets
Sir Frank Worrell Memorial Ground, St. Augustine
Umpires: Ian Gould (Eng) and Peter Parker (Aus)

9 March 2007
(scorecard)

New Zealand; 285/8 (50 overs)	v	Sri Lanka; 267 (48.2 overs)
Lou Vincent 70; Lasith Malinga 2/26 (4 overs)		Upul Tharanga 106; Scott Styris 2/44 (10 overs)

New Zealand won by 18 runs
3Ws Oval, Bridgetown
Umpires: Steve Davis (Aus) and Ian Howell (SA)

==== Aggregate warm-up results ====
Team	Played	Won	Lost
Australia	2	2	0
Bangladesh	2	2	0
Bermuda	2	0	2
Canada	2	0	2
England	2	1	1
India	2	2	0
Ireland	2	1	1
Kenya	2	1	1
Netherlands	2	0	2
New Zealand	2	1	1
Pakistan	2	2	0
Scotland	2	0	2
South Africa	2	1	1
Sri Lanka	2	1	1
West Indies	2	1	1
Zimbabwe	2	1	1

==== Match status ====
None of the warm-up games were officially recognised as ODIs or List A matches by the International Cricket Council due to various changes in the rules of the game. Whilst normally only 11 players are allowed to bat and field (excluding situations involving a substitute fielder), 13 players were used in each team's squad for the matches – 11 of which were allowed to field at one time and 11 of which were allowed to bat (meaning players could be swapped in and out when fielding or bowling, but two players did not bat in a match). In official ICC matches match referees are required to help officiate a game, but due to the changes in the rules none were appointed for any of the warm-up games. Additionally, Man of the Match awards were not given out and no reserve days were set for these matches.

=== Opening ceremony ===
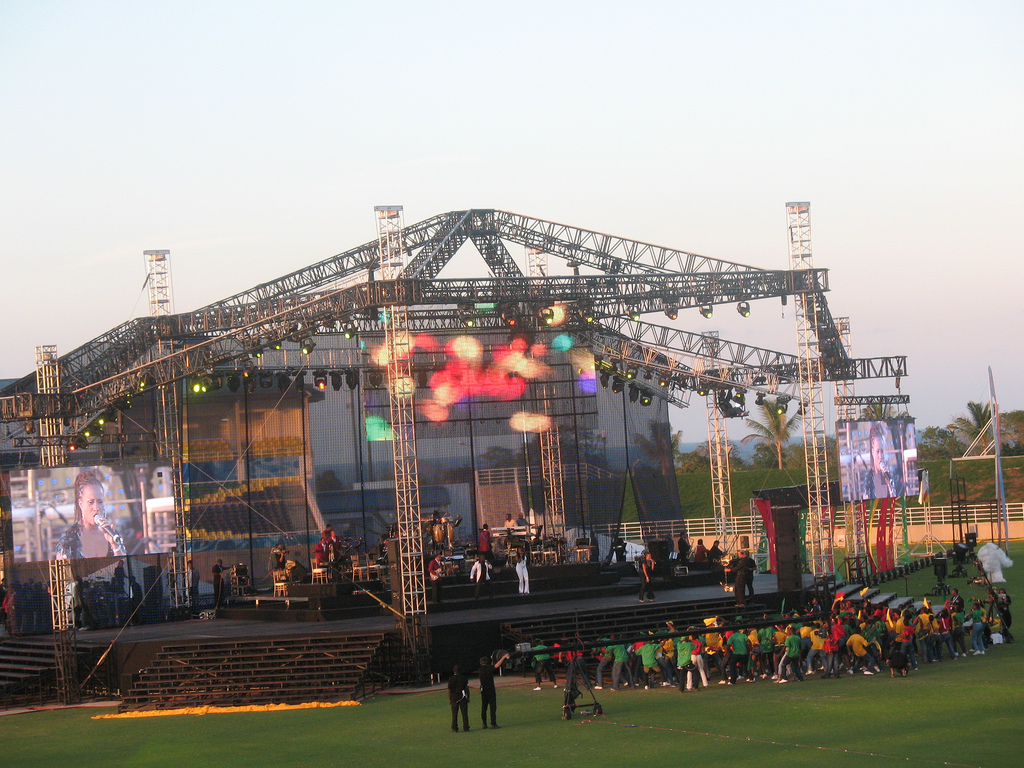
Alison Hinds performing during the ceremony

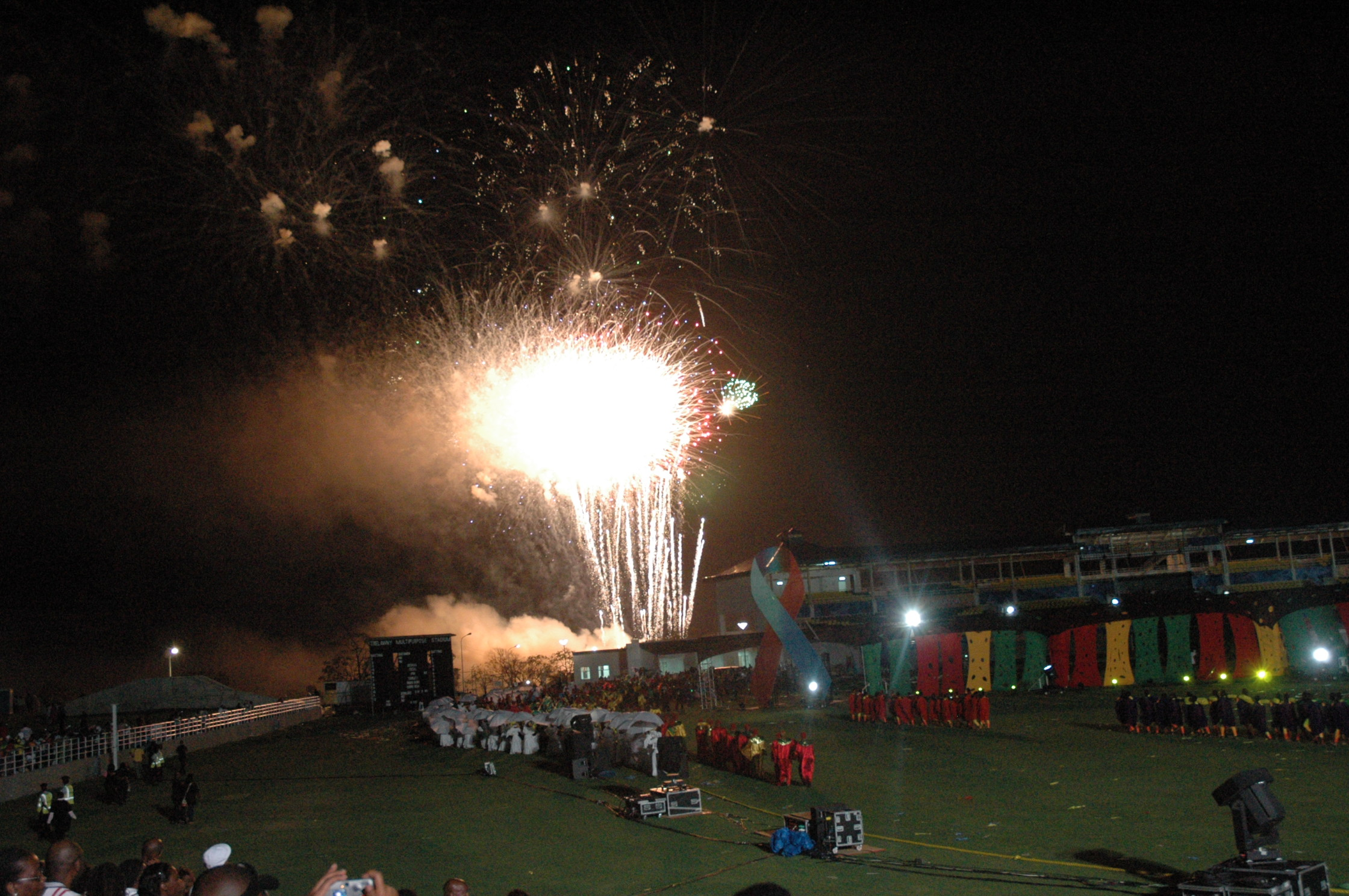
Fireworks in the opening ceremony of the 2007 Cricket World Cup

The opening ceremony was held on Sunday, 11 March 2007 at Trelawny Stadium in Jamaica. It featured over 2,000 dancers and performers representing all strands of West Indian music, from calypso and ragga to reggae and soca. Among the performers were Sean Paul, Byron Lee, Kevin Lyttle, Beres Hammond, Lucky Dube, Buju Banton, Half Pint, Arrow, Machel Montano, Alison Hinds, Tony Rebel, Third World, Gregory Isaacs, David Rudder, Shaggy, the I Threes, and Jimmy Cliff.

The ceremony, attended by several heads of state including the Governor-General of Jamaica, started with an address by Sir Garfield Sobers and included messages from the prime ministers of Jamaica and Grenada.

== Rules and regulations ==
=== Matches ===
The matches were One Day Internationals and operated under normal ODI rules. All matches were to be 50 overs a team unless stated otherwise by the umpires or match referee. A bowler was able to bowl a maximum of 10 overs per match.

In the event of bad weather, each team must have batted a minimum of 20 overs for a result to be declared (if the match was not otherwise won, for example if the team batting second were dismissed before the completion of 20 overs). In the event of bad weather, the Duckworth–Lewis method was to be applied to determine the result or target. If no result was declared on the scheduled day, the teams would return the following day to complete the game, with the same situation as when the game was abandoned.

There was a new rule regarding referral of catches to the TV replay official (third umpire): if the standing umpires were unable to determine whether a catch had been taken cleanly, and/or whether a claimed catch was a "bump ball", they had discretion to refer the decision to the third umpire. Also, whilst reviewing such a catch via TV replay if it was clear to the third umpire that the batsman did not hit the ball, he was to indicate that the batsman was not out.

=== Tournament points ===
In the Group and Super 8 stages, points were awarded as follows:

Points
Results	Points
Win	2 points
Tie/No Result	1 point
Loss	0 points

The top two teams from each group advanced to the Super 8 stage and any points they earned against the other qualifier from their own group was carried through. Points earned against the non-qualifying teams in the same pool were not carried over. In the Super 8s, each team played the six remaining qualifiers from the other groups and the top four teams went through to the semi-finals. Positions were decided by most points. Where two or more teams were tied on points, the following methods in turn were used to decide which team went through:

1. Most wins in their group or in Super 8, whichever is applicable
2. Higher net run rate
3. Higher number of wickets taken per ball
4. Winners of head-to-head matches
5. The drawing of lots

== Match officials ==
The umpiring panel for the 2007 Cricket World Cup comprised nine umpires from the Elite Panel of ICC Umpires (the only member not included was Darrell Hair), and nine umpires from the international panel. The refereeing panel consisted of seven members from the Elite Panel of ICC Referees, with Clive Lloyd not being included due to his role as the West Indies's team manager. Aleem Dar went on to stand as an umpire in his first World Cup final, alongside Steve Bucknor who appeared in his fifth final in a row, extending his record of four from the 2003 World Cup.

== Groups ==
=== Seeds ===
The tournament began with a league stage consisting of four groups of four. Each team played each of the other teams in its group once. Australia, India, England, and the West Indies were placed in separate pools for logistical reasons, as they were expected to have the most supporters in attendance, and transport and accommodation capacity in the West Indies was limited.

The groups are listed below, with seedings (rankings from April 2005) shown in brackets. Each group played all of its matches at a single ground.

Group A	Group B	Group C	Group D
Australia (1)	Sri Lanka (2)	New Zealand (3)	Pakistan (4)
South Africa (5)	India (6)	England (7)	West Indies (8)
Scotland (12)	Bangladesh (11)	Kenya (10)	Zimbabwe (9)
Netherlands (16)	Bermuda (15)	Canada (14)	Ireland (13)

=== Format ===
The tournament was preceded by a number of warm-up matches to allow the players to acclimatise to the conditions in the West Indies. The group stage matches started on 13 March and finished on 25 March. There were a total of 24 matches played in the group stage.

The top two teams in each group proceeded to the "Super 8" stage which also used a league system. Each team carried forward its result against the other team qualifying from its preliminary stage group, and played the other six qualifying teams once each. The top four teams in the league qualified for the semi-finals. This system was modified since the previous World Cup, which had a "Super 6" stage rather than a Super 8. The Super 8 stage matches were played from Tuesday 27 March until Saturday 21 April. A total of 24 matches were played in the Super 8 stage.

The top four teams in the "Super 8" advanced to the semi-finals. This was the knockout stage, with the No. 1 team playing the No. 4 team, and the No. 2 team playing the No. 3 team in the tournament. The winners of the two semi-finals played each other in the Final.

All tournament matches had one reserve day (the day after the scheduled day of the match) to allow for matches to be completed in the event of bad weather.

== Group stage ==
=== Group A ===
Pos	Team	Pld	W	L	T	NR	Pts	NRR
1	Australia	3	3	0	0	0	6	3.433
2	South Africa	3	2	1	0	0	4	2.403
3	Netherlands	3	1	2	0	0	2	−2.527
4	Scotland	3	0	3	0	0	0	−3.793

Source: ESPNcricinfo

14 March 2007
Scorecard

Australia; 334/6 (50 overs)	v	Scotland; 131 (40.1 overs)

Australia won by 203 runs
Warner Park Stadium, Basseterre

16 March 2007
Scorecard

South Africa; 353/3 (40 overs)	v	Netherlands; 132/9 (40 overs)

South Africa won by 221 runs
Warner Park Stadium, Basseterre

18 March 2007
Scorecard

Australia; 358/5 (50 overs)	v	Netherlands; 129 (26.5 overs)

Australia won by 229 runs
Warner Park Stadium, Basseterre

20 March 2007
Scorecard

Scotland; 186/8 (50 overs)	v	South Africa; 188/3 (23.2 overs)

South Africa won by 7 wickets
Warner Park Stadium, Basseterre

22 March 2007
Scorecard

Scotland; 136 (34.1 overs)	v	Netherlands; 140/2 (23.5 overs)

Netherlands won by 8 wickets
Warner Park Stadium, Basseterre

24 March 2007
Scorecard

Australia; 377/6 (50 overs)	v	South Africa; 294 (48 overs)

Australia won by 83 runs
Warner Park Stadium, Basseterre

=== Group B ===
Pos	Team	Pld	W	L	T	NR	Pts	NRR
1	Sri Lanka	3	3	0	0	0	6	3.493
2	Bangladesh	3	2	1	0	0	4	−1.523
3	India	3	1	2	0	0	2	1.206
4	Bermuda	3	0	3	0	0	0	−4.345

Source: ESPNcricinfo

15 March 2007
Scorecard

Sri Lanka; 321/6 (50 overs)	v	Bermuda; 78 (24.4 overs)

Sri Lanka won by 243 runs
Queen's Park Oval, Port of Spain

17 March 2007
Scorecard

India; 191 (49.3 overs)	v	Bangladesh; 192/5 (48.3 overs)

Bangladesh won by 5 wickets
Queen's Park Oval, Port of Spain

19 March 2007
Scorecard

India; 413/5 (50 overs)	v	Bermuda; 156 (43.1 overs)

India won by 257 runs
Queen's Park Oval, Port of Spain

21 March 2007
Scorecard

Sri Lanka; 318/4 (50 overs)	v	Bangladesh; 112 (37 overs)

Sri Lanka won by 198 runs (D/L)
Queen's Park Oval, Port of Spain

23 March 2007
Scorecard

Sri Lanka; 254/6 (50 overs)	v	India; 185 (43.3 overs)

Sri Lanka won by 69 runs
Queen's Park Oval, Port of Spain

25 March 2007
Scorecard

Bermuda; 94/9 (21 overs)	v	Bangladesh; 96/3 (17.3 overs)

Bangladesh won by 7 wickets (D/L)
Queen's Park Oval, Port of Spain

=== Group C ===
Pos	Team	Pld	W	L	T	NR	Pts	NRR
1	New Zealand	3	3	0	0	0	6	2.138
2	England	3	2	1	0	0	4	0.418
3	Kenya	3	1	2	0	0	2	−1.194
4	Canada	3	0	3	0	0	0	−1.389

Source: ESPNcricinfo

14 March 2007
Scorecard

Canada; 199 (50 overs)	v	Kenya; 203/3 (43.2 overs)

Kenya won by 7 wickets
Beausejour Stadium, Gros Islet

16 March 2007
Scorecard

England; 209/7 (50 overs)	v	New Zealand; 210/4 (41 overs)

New Zealand won by 6 wickets
Beausejour Stadium, Gros Islet

18 March 2007
Scorecard

England; 279/6 (50 overs)	v	Canada; 228/7 (50 overs)

England won by 51 runs
Beausejour Stadium, Gros Islet

20 March 2007
Scorecard

New Zealand; 331/7 (50 overs)	v	Kenya; 183 (49.2 overs)

New Zealand won by 148 runs
Beausejour Stadium, Gros Islet

22 March 2007
Scorecard

New Zealand; 363/5 (50 overs)	v	Canada; 249/9 (49.2 overs)

New Zealand won by 114 runs
Beausejour Stadium, Gros Islet

24 March 2007
Scorecard

Kenya; 177 (43 overs)	v	England; 178/3 (33 overs)

England won by 7 wickets
Beausejour Stadium, Gros Islet

=== Group D ===
Pos	Team	Pld	W	L	T	NR	Pts	NRR
1	West Indies	3	3	0	0	0	6	0.764
2	Ireland	3	1	1	1	0	3	−0.092
3	Pakistan	3	1	2	0	0	2	0.089
4	Zimbabwe	3	0	2	1	0	1	−0.886

Source: ESPNcricinfo

13 March 2007
Scorecard

West Indies; 241/9 (50 overs)	v	Pakistan; 187 (47.2 overs)

West Indies won by 54 runs
Sabina Park, Kingston

15 March 2007
Scorecard

Ireland; 221/9 (50 overs)	v	Zimbabwe; 221 (50 overs)

Match tied
Sabina Park, Kingston

17 March 2007
Scorecard

Pakistan; 132 (45.4 overs)	v	Ireland; 133/7 (41.4 overs)

Ireland won by 3 wickets (D/L)
Sabina Park, Kingston

19 March 2007
Scorecard

Zimbabwe; 202/5 (50 overs)	v	West Indies; 204/4 (47.5 overs)

West Indies won by 6 wickets
Sabina Park, Kingston

21 March 2007
Scorecard

Pakistan; 349 (49.5 overs)	v	Zimbabwe; 99 (19.1 overs)

Pakistan won by 93 runs (D/L)
Sabina Park, Kingston

23 March 2007
Scorecard

Ireland; 183/8 (48 overs)	v	West Indies; 190/2 (38.1 overs)

West Indies won by 8 wickets (D/L)
Sabina Park, Kingston

== Super 8 stage ==
The top two teams in each first-round group moved on to a "Super 8" stage which was scored as a complete round-robin. However, each of the eight teams played only six new matches, rather than seven – each group's two representatives carried forward their result against each other rather than play again. Thus the table below, showing seven matches for each team, covers all matches between the Super 8 qualifiers, including those from the Group Stage.

Teams depicted in green backgrounds qualified for the semi-finals.

Pos	Team	Pld	W	L	T	NR	Pts	NRR
1	Australia	7	7	0	0	0	14	2.400
2	Sri Lanka	7	5	2	0	0	10	1.483
3	New Zealand	7	5	2	0	0	10	0.253
4	South Africa	7	4	3	0	0	8	0.313
5	England	7	3	4	0	0	6	−0.394
6	West Indies	7	2	5	0	0	4	−0.566
7	Bangladesh	7	1	6	0	0	2	−1.514
8	Ireland	7	1	6	0	0	2	−1.730

27 March 2007
Scorecard

Australia; 322/6 (50 overs)	v	West Indies; 219 (45.3 overs)

Australia won by 103 runs
Sir Vivian Richards Stadium, North Sound

28 March 2007
Scorecard

Sri Lanka; 209 (49.3 overs)	v	South Africa; 212/9 (48.2 overs)

South Africa won by 1 wicket
Providence Stadium, Guyana

29 March 2007
Scorecard

West Indies; 177 (44.4 overs)	v	New Zealand; 179/3 (39.2 overs)

New Zealand won by 7 wickets
Sir Vivian Richards Stadium, North Sound

30 March 2007
Scorecard

England; 266/7 (50 overs)	v	Ireland; 218 (48.1 overs)

England won by 48 runs
Providence Stadium, Guyana

31 March 2007
Scorecard

Bangladesh; 104/6 (22 overs)	v	Australia; 106/0 (13.5 overs)

Australia won by 10 wickets
Sir Vivian Richards Stadium, North Sound

1 April 2007
Scorecard

Sri Lanka; 303/5 (50 overs)	v	West Indies; 190 (44.3 overs)

Sri Lanka won by 113 runs
Providence Stadium, Guyana

2 April 2007
Scorecard

Bangladesh; 174 (48.3 overs)	v	New Zealand; 178/1 (29.2 overs)

New Zealand won by 9 wickets
Sir Vivian Richards Stadium, North Sound

3 April 2007
Scorecard

Ireland; 152/8 (35 overs)	v	South Africa; 165/3 (31.3 overs)

South Africa won by 7 wickets (DL)
Providence Stadium, Guyana

4 April 2007
Scorecard

Sri Lanka; 235 (50 overs)	v	England; 233/8 (50 overs)

Sri Lanka won by 2 runs
Sir Vivian Richards Stadium, North Sound

7 April 2007
Scorecard

Bangladesh; 251/8 (50 overs)	v	South Africa; 184 (48.4 overs)

Bangladesh won by 67 runs
Providence Stadium, Guyana

8 April 2007
Scorecard

England; 247 (49.5 overs)	v	Australia; 248/3 (47.2 overs)

Australia won by 7 wickets
Sir Vivian Richards Stadium, North Sound

9 April 2007
Scorecard

New Zealand; 263/8 (50 overs)	v	Ireland; 134 (37.4 overs)

New Zealand won by 129 runs
Providence Stadium, Guyana

10 April 2007
Scorecard

South Africa; 356/4 (50 overs)	v	West Indies; 289/9 (50 overs)

South Africa won by 67 runs
Queen's Park, Grenada

11 April 2007
Scorecard

Bangladesh; 143 (37.2 overs)	v	England; 147/6 (44.5 overs)

England won by 4 wickets
Kensington Oval, Bridgetown

12 April 2007
Scorecard

New Zealand; 219/7 (50 overs)	v	Sri Lanka; 222/4 (45.1 overs)

Sri Lanka won by 6 wickets
Queen's Park, Grenada

13 April 2007
Scorecard

Ireland; 91 (30 overs)	v	Australia; 92/1 (12.2 overs)

Australia won by 9 wickets
Kensington Oval, Bridgetown

14 April 2007
Scorecard

South Africa; 193/7 (50 overs)	v	New Zealand; 196/5 (48.2 overs)

New Zealand won by 5 wickets
Queen's Park, Grenada

15 April 2007
Scorecard

Ireland; 243/7 (50 overs)	v	Bangladesh; 169 (41.2 overs)

Ireland won by 74 runs
Kensington Oval, Bridgetown

16 April 2007
Scorecard

Sri Lanka; 226 (49.4 overs)	v	Australia; 232/3 (42.4 overs)

Australia won by 7 wickets
Queen's Park, Grenada

17 April 2007
Scorecard

England; 154 (48 overs)	v	South Africa; 157/1 (19.2 overs)

South Africa won by 9 wickets
Kensington Oval, Bridgetown

18 April 2007
Scorecard

Ireland; 77 (27.4 overs)	v	Sri Lanka; 81/2 (10 overs)

Sri Lanka won by 8 wickets
Queen's Park, Grenada

19 April 2007
Scorecard

West Indies; 230/5 (50 overs)	v	Bangladesh; 131 (43.5 overs)

West Indies won by 99 runs
Kensington Oval, Bridgetown

20 April 2007
Scorecard

Australia; 348/6 (50 overs)	v	New Zealand; 133 (25.5 overs)

Australia won by 215 runs
Queen's Park, Grenada

21 April 2007
Scorecard

West Indies; 300 (49.5 overs)	v	England; 301/9 (49.5 overs)

England won by 1 wicket
Kensington Oval, Bridgetown

== Knockout stage ==
Semi-finals
25 April – Beausejour Stadium, Gros Islet
4 South Africa	149
1 Australia	153/3
24 April – Sabina Park, Kingston
2 Sri Lanka	289/5
3 New Zealand	208

Final
28 April – Kensington Oval, Bridgetown
Australia	281/4
Sri Lanka	215/8

=== Semi-finals ===
24 April 2007
Scorecard

Sri Lanka; 289/5 (50 overs)	v	New Zealand; 208 (41.4 overs)
Mahela Jayawardene 115* (109); James Franklin 2/46 (9 overs)		Peter Fulton 46 (77); Muttiah Muralitharan 4/31 (8 overs)

Sri Lanka won by 81 runs
Sabina Park, Kingston
Umpires: Rudi Koertzen (SA) and Simon Taufel (Aus)
Player of the match: Mahela Jayawardene (SL)

- Sri Lanka won the toss and elected to bat.
- Sri Lanka qualified for the final for second time after 1996.
- Stephen Fleming (NZ) played in his last ODI match.

25 April 2007
Scorecard

South Africa; 149 (43.5 overs)	v	Australia; 153/3 (31.3 overs)
Justin Kemp 49* (91); Shaun Tait 4/39 (10 overs)		Michael Clarke 60* (86); Shaun Pollock 1/16 (5 overs)

Australia won by 7 wickets
Beausejour Stadium, Gros Islet
Umpires: Steve Bucknor (WI) and Aleem Dar (Pak)
Player of the match: Glenn McGrath (Aus)

- South Africa won the toss and elected to bat.
- Australia qualified for the final for sixth time after 1975, 1987, 1996, 1999 and 2003.

=== Final ===
28 April 2007
Scorecard

Australia; 281/4 (38 overs)	v	Sri Lanka; 215/8 (36 overs)
Adam Gilchrist 149 (104); Lasith Malinga 2/49 (8 overs)		Sanath Jayasuriya 63 (67); Michael Clarke 2/33 (5 overs)

Australia won by 53 runs (D/L method)
Kensington Oval, Bridgetown
Umpires: Steve Bucknor (WI) and Aleem Dar (Pak)
Player of the match: Adam Gilchrist (Aus)

- Australia won the toss and elected to bat.
- The match was reduced to 38 overs per side due to rain.
- Sri Lanka were set a revised target of 269 runs from 36 overs.
- Glenn McGrath (Aus) and Russel Arnold (SL) both played in their last ODI.
- With this victory, Australia became the first team to win three consecutive World Cup titles.

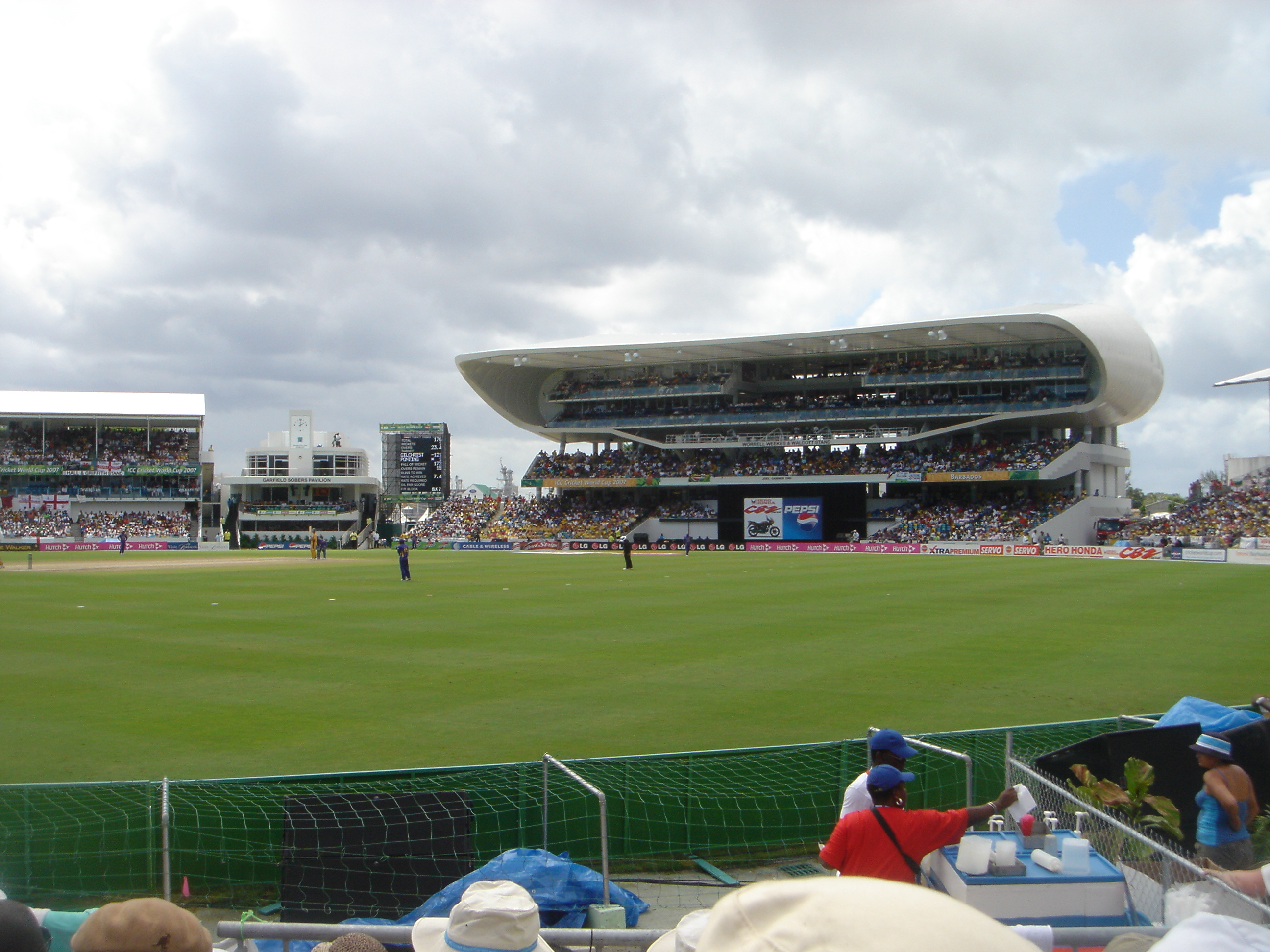
Final of 2007 Cricket World Cup between Sri Lanka and Australia

This was the first World Cup final to be a repeat: the teams previously met in the 1996 World Cup final, which Sri Lanka won. Australia had won every World Cup match against Sri Lanka apart from that loss. The match was Sri Lanka's second World Cup final appearance, and Australia's fourth in a row and sixth overall. Australian captain Ricky Ponting won the toss and elected to bat. However, the start of play was delayed due to rain, and the match was reduced to 38 overs per side. Wicketkeeper Adam Gilchrist played an innings of 149 – the highest for any batsman in a World Cup final – to give Australia an imposing total going in at the break.

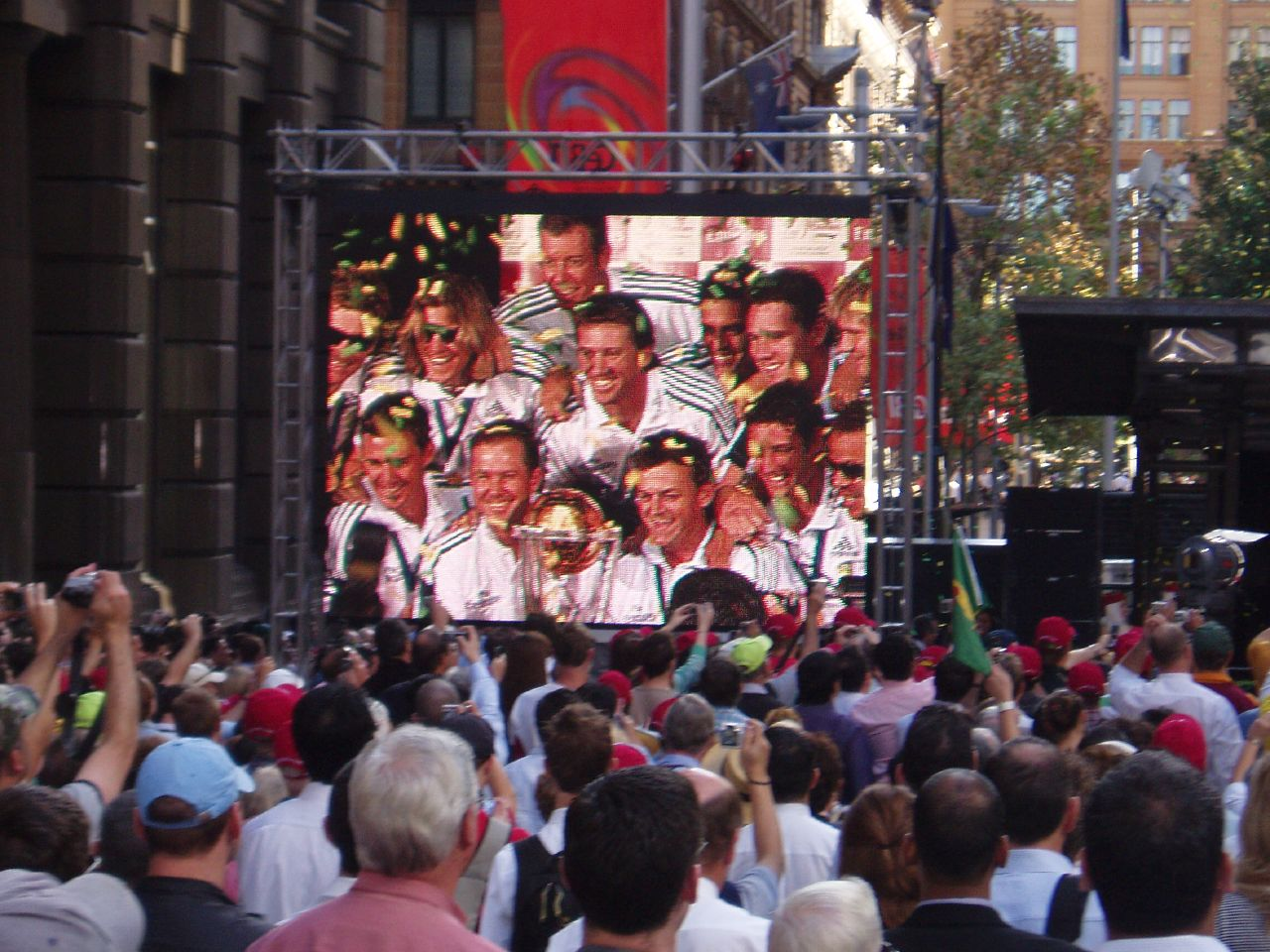
A large crowd of over 10,000 fans welcome the Australian team on completing the first World Cup hat-trick – Martin Place, Sydney.

While Sri Lankan batsmen Kumar Sangakkara and Sanath Jayasuriya were adding 116 for the second wicket, the contest was alive, but after the pair got out, Sri Lanka's chances slowly diminished. Further rain forced the reduction of Sri Lanka's innings to just 36 overs, with the target revised to 269. At the end of the 33rd over, with Sri Lanka still trailing the adjusted Duckworth-Lewis target by 37 runs, the umpires suspended the game due to bad light. While Australia's players began to celebrate their victory (since the minimum 20 overs had been reached), the umpires incorrectly announced that because the match was suspended due to light and not rain, the final three overs would have to be bowled the following day. With Sri Lanka needing 61 runs from 18 deliveries, Sri Lankan captain Mahela Jayawardene agreed there was no need to return the following day, and instructed his team to resume batting; Ponting agreed to play only spin bowlers. The last three overs were played in almost complete darkness, during which Sri Lanka added just nine runs to give Australia a 53-run victory by the D-L method. The umpires later apologised for their error, saying that the match should have ended then with Australia winning by 37 runs.

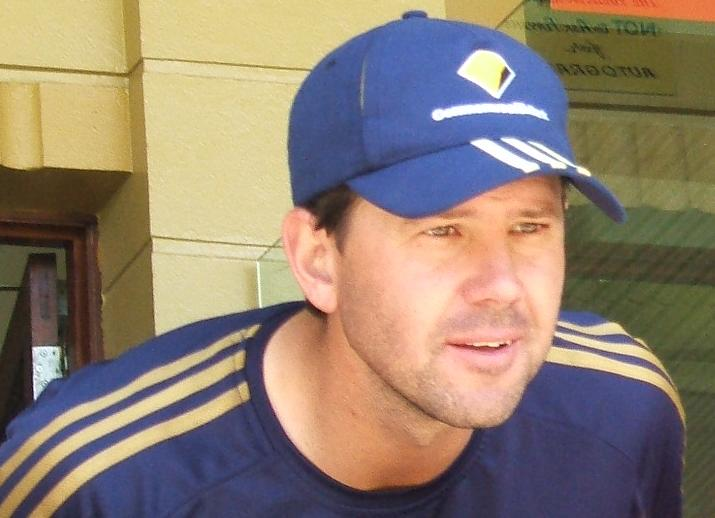
Australian captain Ricky Ponting

Australia won the tournament undefeated, extending their streak of World Cup matches without a loss to 29. Australian bowler Glenn McGrath was named 'Player of the Series' and retired from all forms of international cricket.

== Statistics ==
=== Most runs ===
Player	Team	Runs
Matthew Hayden	Australia	659
Mahela Jayawardene	Sri Lanka	548
Ricky Ponting	Australia	539
Scott Styris	New Zealand	499
Jacques Kallis	South Africa	485

=== Most wickets ===
Player	Team	Wickets
Glenn McGrath	Australia	26
Muttiah Muralitharan	Sri Lanka	23
Shaun Tait	Australia	23
Brad Hogg	Australia	21
Lasith Malinga	Sri Lanka	18

== Controversies ==
=== Death of Bob Woolmer ===
Pakistan coach Bob Woolmer was found dead on 18 March 2007, one day after his team's defeat to Ireland put them out of the running for the World Cup. Jamaican police performed an autopsy which was deemed inconclusive. The following day police announced that the death was suspicious and ordered a full investigation. Further investigation revealed the cause of death was "manual strangulation", and that the investigation would be handled as a murder. After a lengthy investigation the Jamaican police rescinded the comments that he was murdered, and confirmed that he died from natural causes. In November 2007, an open verdict was returned.

=== Criticism ===
The 2007 World Cup organisers were criticised early on for being over-commercialised and, in particular, the generally smaller crowds have been blamed on the ICC's security restrictions on things such as outside food, signs, replica kits, and musical instruments, despite Caribbean cricketing customs, as well as the authorities being accused of "running [cricket and cricketing traditions] out of town, then sanitising it out of existence". Sir Viv Richards echoed the concerns. The ICC were also condemned for high prices of tickets and concessions, which were considered unaffordable for the local population in many of the locations. ICC CEO, Malcolm Speed, said that the ICC recognised the problem but said it was the local organisers' fault. However, the later matches had more crowds as the tournament progressed with the local organisers easing restrictions. Although it did not meet the target of US$42 million, the US$32 million revenue from ticket sales was the highest of any Cricket World Cup yet, and double that of the previous World Cup.

The World Cup was also criticised by the BCCI for its format because India failed to move on from the group stage after losing two of their three matches. The BCCI later claimed it would see to it that the ICC alter its format for the 2011 Cricket World Cup. The elimination of both India and Pakistan also caused a large exodus of subcontinental fans from the Caribbean, and removed the prospect of an India vs Pakistan Super Eights match, generally considered as the most revenue generating and electric match in the tournament.

The tournament was also criticised as being too long. At 6 weeks, it was the same length as the 2003 World Cup, but longer than the 5-week 1999 World Cup and the 4-week 1996 World Cup. The famous West Indian fast bowler Michael Holding also criticised the qualification process for the 2007 World Cup. Holding expressed doubts over the benefit to less-established teams of turning up and being heavily defeated. However, former Scotland captain George Salmond claims that the opportunity to play one-day cricket against the bigger teams is invaluable for smaller teams such as his own, and questioned the validity of Holding's statements. The majority of the experts and players participating in the tournament backed up the smaller teams taking part in the World Cup. This was further backed up with Ireland and Bangladesh making the Super 8s and being competitive and sportsmanlike throughout the tournament.

During the Pakistan and Canada warm-up match at Sir Frank Worrell Memorial Ground, the sight screen was knocked down and the game was delayed by over 70 minutes and reduced to 48 overs. Additionally, a tear gas canister exploded at the Trinidad hotel where the Pakistan, South Africa, Canada and Ireland teams were staying. The hotel had to be evacuated but no injuries were reported.

A number of concerns were expressed regarding the conditions of the pitches for the warm-up matches. During the Pakistan and South Africa warm-up game, the teams were unhappy with the condition of the pitch, claiming irregular bounce off the wicket was "treacherous". In addition, a number of teams expressed concern over the slow wickets used during the warm-up matches, although Cricinfo writer Sambit Bal welcomed the pitches slowing down as a method of making the battle between the batsmen and the bowlers more equal.

Further criticism was generated by the confusion at the end of the final match: the umpires announced that play was suspended due to bad light, which caused the Australian team to erupt in celebration as the scoreboard and official announcements declared Australia the winners. However, the umpires incorrectly insisted that the game was only suspended and not completed, and that 3 overs remained to be played, so in farcical light conditions, Sri Lanka batted out the remaining 3 overs following a gentleman's agreement between the two captains. The umpires and the ICC apologised for the unnecessary situation and cited it as an unnecessary fundamental error due to the pressure of the situation. In June, the ICC announced that the officials involved – onfield umpires Steve Bucknor and Aleem Dar, reserve umpires Rudi Koertzen and Billy Bowden, and match referee Jeff Crowe – would all be suspended from the 2007 Twenty20 World Championship.

=== Preparation problems ===
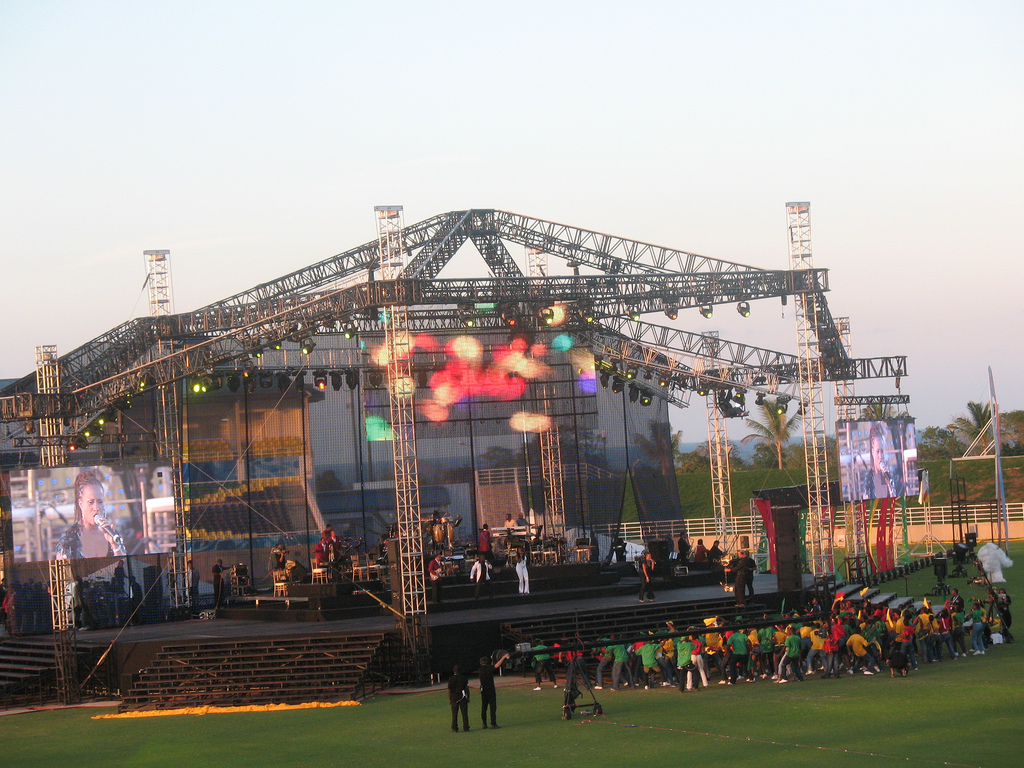
Greenfield Stadium in Trelawny, Jamaica encountered technical problems before playing host to four of the warm-up matches

A number of preparation problems surfaced before the start of the World Cup. Some of the venues were not complete by the opening ceremony on 11 March 2007. At Sabina Park, seats had to be removed at the newly constructed north-stand due to safety concerns. At Trelawny Stadium in Jamaica, ground staff were unable to gain admission to the ground during the warm-up matches due to accreditation problems. Additionally, South Africa and Australia both expressed concerns over practice facilities.

Ultimately none of the stadiums used in the warm-up games were used in any other part of the tournament except for the Greenfield Stadium in Trelawny, Jamaica, which hosted the opening ceremony but no matches.

== Media coverage ==
The World Cup had grown as a media event with each tournament. The sponsorship and television rights that were awarded primarily to cover the 2003 and 2007 World Cups raised over US$550 million. The 2007 World Cup was televised in over 200 countries to a viewing audience estimated at more than two billion viewers and was expected to generate more than 100,000 unique visitors to the West Indies travelling solely for the tournament.

The 2007 Cricket World Cup featured an orange, anthropomorphic raccoon-like creature named "Mello" as its mascot. It was announced during matches that Mello had no race, species, age or gender – it was an attitude, the attitude of the young people of the West Indies. The official song for the World Cup was "The Game of Love and Unity" by Jamaican-born Shaggy, Barbadian entertainer Rupee, and Trinidadian Fay-Ann Lyons.

The 2007 tournament recorded the highest ticket sales for a Cricket World Cup, selling more than 672,000. Attendance leading into the semi-finals for the 2007 World Cup was 403,000, an average of 8,500 supporters per match.

== See also ==
- West Indies Cricket Board
- CARICOM Visa and Freedom of Travel during Cricket World Cup
- 2007 Cricket World Cup venues
