= List of 2007 Cricket World Cup venues =

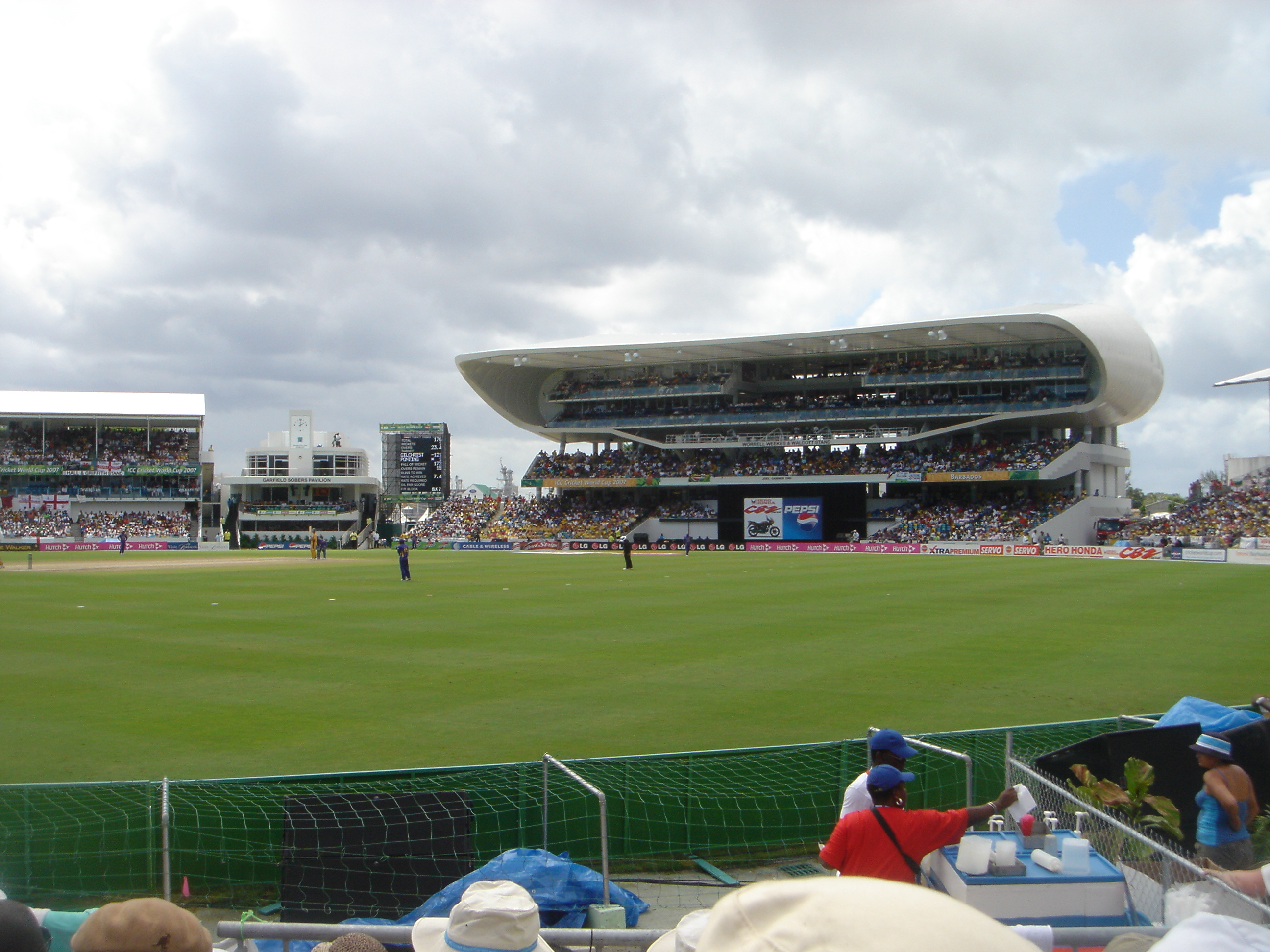
Kensington Oval during the World Cup Final

The 2007 Cricket World Cup took place in the West Indies from 13 March to 28 April 2007, using the sports One Day International format. A total of 16 teams participated in 51 matches throughout the tournament and were initially divided into four groups, with the two best-performing teams from each group moving on to a "Super 8" format. From this, Australia, New Zealand, Sri Lanka and South Africa won through to the semi-finals, with Australia defeating Sri Lanka in the final to win their third consecutive World Cup.

Events took place at eight venues, with four venues used in warm-up matches.

Country	City	Stadium	Capacity	Matches	Cost
Antigua and Barbuda	St John's	Sir Vivian Richards Stadium	20,000	Super 8	US$54 Million
Barbados	Bridgetown	Kensington Oval	28,000	Super 8 & Final	US$69.1 Million
Grenada	St George's	Queen's Park	20,000	Super 8	US$5 Million
Guyana	Georgetown	Providence Stadium	20,000	Super 8	US$26 Million/US$46 Million
Jamaica	Kingston	Sabina Park	20,000	Group D & Semi-final	US$26 Million
Saint Kitts and Nevis	Basseterre	Warner Park Stadium	10,000	Group A	US$12 Million
Saint Lucia	Gros Islet	Beausejour Stadium	20,000	Group C & Semi-final	US$13 Million
Trinidad and Tobago	Port of Spain	Queen's Park Oval	25,000	Group B	

Four additional venues hosted warm-up matches.

Country	City	Stadium	Capacity	Cost
Barbados	Bridgetown	3Ws Oval	8,500	
Jamaica	Trelawny	Greenfield Stadium	25,000	US$35 Million
Saint Vincent and the Grenadines	Kingstown	Arnos Vale Stadium	12,000	
Trinidad and Tobago	St. Augustine	Sir Frank Worrell Memorial Ground	22,000	
